= 16th Canadian Parliament =

1926–1930 national legislative term

- Minority parliament
- Dec. 9, 1926 – May. 30, 1930

Parliament leaders
- Prime minister: William Lyon Mackenzie King; Sep. 25, 1926 – Aug. 7, 1930
- Cabinet: 14th Canadian Ministry
- Leader of the Opposition: Hugh Guthrie; 11 October 1926 – 11 October 1927
- Richard Bedford Bennett; 12 October 1927 – 6 August 1930

Party caucuses
- Government: Liberal Party
- Opposition: Conservative Party
- Crossbench: Progressive Party
- United Farmers of Alberta
- Labour

House of Commons
- Seating arrangements of the House of Commons
- Speaker of the Commons: Rodolphe Lemieux; 8 March 1922 – 2 June 1930
- Members: 245 MP seats List of members

Senate
- Speaker of the Senate: Hewitt Bostock; 7 February 1922 – 12 May 1930
- Arthur Charles Hardy; 13 May 1930 – 2 September 1930
- Government Senate leader: Raoul Dandurand; 25 September 1926 – 6 August 1930
- Opposition Senate leader: William Benjamin Ross; 31 December 1926 – 10 January 1929
- Wellington Bartley Willoughby; 11 January 1929 – 7 August 1930

Sovereign
- Monarch: George V 6 May 1910 – 20 January 1936
- Governor general: Freeman Freeman-Thomas; 2 October 1926 – 4 April 1931

Sessions
- 1st session 9 December 1926 – 14 April 1927
- 2nd session 26 January 1928 – 11 June 1928
- 3rd session 7 February 1929 – 14 June 1929
- 4th session 20 February 1930 – 30 May 1930
← 15th	→ 17th

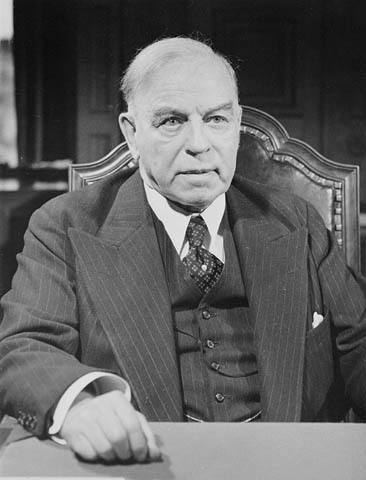
William Lyon Mackenzie King was Prime Minister during the 16th Canadian Parliament.

The 16th Canadian Parliament was in session from 9 December 1926, until 30 May 1930. The membership was set by the 1926 federal election on 14 September 1926, and it changed only somewhat due to resignations and by-elections until it was dissolved prior to the 1930 election.

It was controlled by a Liberal Party minority under Prime Minister William Lyon Mackenzie King and the 14th Canadian Ministry. The Official Opposition was the Conservative Party, led briefly by Hugh Guthrie, and then by Richard Bedford Bennett.

The Speaker was Rodolphe Lemieux. See also List of Canadian electoral districts 1924-1933 for a list of the ridings in this parliament.

There were four sessions of the 16th Parliament:

Session	Start	End
1st	9 December 1926	14 April 1927
2nd	26 January 1928	11 June 1928
3rd	7 February 1929	14 June 1929
4th	20 February 1930	30 May 1930

== List of members ==
Following is a full list of members of the sixteenth Parliament listed first by province, then by electoral district.

Key:

- Party leaders are italicized.
- Cabinet ministers are in **boldface**.
- The Prime Minister is **both**.
- The Speaker is indicated by "(†)".

Electoral districts denoted by an asterisk (*) indicates that district was represented by two members.

=== Alberta ===
Electoral district	Name	Party	First elected/previously elected	No. of terms
Acadia	Robert Gardiner	United Farmers of Alberta	1921	4th term
Athabaska	Donald Ferdinand Kellner	United Farmers of Alberta	1921, 1926	2nd term*
Battle River	Henry Elvins Spencer	United Farmers of Alberta	1921	3rd term
Bow River	Edward Joseph Garland	United Farmers of Alberta	1921	3rd term
Calgary East	Herbert Bealey Adshead	Labour	1926	1st term
Calgary West	Richard Bedford Bennett	Conservative	1911, 1925	3rd term*
Camrose	William Thomas Lucas	United Farmers of Alberta	1921	3rd term
Edmonton East	Kenneth Alexander Blatchford	Liberal	1926	1st term
Edmonton West	**Charles Stewart**	Liberal	1925	2nd term
Edmonton West	**Charles Stewart** (by-election of 2 November 1926)	Liberal	1925	2nd term
Lethbridge	Lincoln Henry Jelliff	United Farmers of Alberta	1921	3rd term
Macleod	George Gibson Coote	United Farmers of Alberta	1921	3rd term
Medicine Hat	Frederick William Gershaw	Liberal	1925	2nd term
Peace River	Donald MacBeth Kennedy	United Farmers of Alberta	1921	3rd term
Red Deer	Alfred Speakman	United Farmers of Alberta	1921	3rd term
Vegreville	Michael Luchkovich	United Farmers of Alberta	1926	1st term
Wetaskiwin	William Irvine	United Farmers of Alberta	1921, (Note: East Calgary (Alberta) (First elected as a Labour)) 1926	2nd term*

=== British Columbia ===
Electoral district	Name	Party	First elected/previously elected	No. of terms
Cariboo	John Anderson Fraser	Conservative	1925	2nd term
Comox—Alberni	Alan Webster Neill	Independent	1921	3rd term
Fraser Valley	Harry James Barber	Conservative	1925	2nd term
Kootenay East	**James Horace King** (until 11 October 1926 emoulment appointment)	Liberal	1922	3rd term
Kootenay East	**James Horace King** (by-election of 9 November 1926)	Liberal	1922	3rd term
Kootenay West	William Esling	Conservative	1925	2nd term
Nanaimo	Charles Dickie	Conservative	1921	3rd term
New Westminster	William Garland McQuarrie	Conservative	1917	4th term
Skeena	James Charles Brady	Conservative	1926	1st term
Vancouver—Burrard	John Arthur Clark	Conservative	1921	3rd term
Vancouver Centre	Henry Herbert Stevens	Conservative	1911	5th term
Vancouver North	Alexander Duncan McRae	Conservative	1926	1st term
Vancouver South	Leon Johnson Ladner	Conservative	1921	3rd term
Victoria	Simon Fraser Tolmie (resigned 5 June 1928)	Conservative	1917	4th term
Victoria	D'Arcy Plunkett (by-election of 6 December 1928)	Conservative	1928	1st term
Yale	Grote Stirling	Conservative	1924	3rd term

=== Manitoba ===
Electoral district	Name	Party	First elected/previously elected	No. of terms
Brandon	**Robert Forke** (until 5 October 1926 ministerial appointment)	Liberal-Progressive	1921	3rd term
Brandon	**Robert Forke** (by-election of 2 November 1926, until 30 December 1929 Senate appointment)	Liberal-Progressive	1921	3rd term
Brandon	**Thomas Crerar** (by-election of 5 February 1930)	Liberal	1917, (Note: Marquette (First elected as a Unionist/Progressive)) 1930	2nd term*
Dauphin	William John Ward	Liberal-Progressive	1921	3rd term
Lisgar	John Livingstone Brown	Liberal-Progressive	1921	3rd term
Macdonald	William James Lovie	Progressive	1921	3rd term
Marquette	James Allison Glen	Liberal-Progressive	1926	1st term
Neepawa	Robert Milne	Progressive	1921, 1926	2nd term*
Nelson	Thomas William Bird	Progressive	1921	3rd term
Portage la Prairie	Ewan McPherson	Liberal	1926	1st term
Provencher	Arthur-Lucien Beaubien	Liberal-Progressive	1921	3rd term
Selkirk	Leland Payson Bancroft	Liberal-Progressive	1921, 1926	2nd term*
Souris	James Steedsman	Progressive	1921	3rd term
Springfield	Edgar Douglas Richmond Bissett	Liberal-Progressive	1926	1st term
St. Boniface	John Power Howden	Liberal	1925	2nd term
Winnipeg North	Abraham Albert Heaps	Labour	1925	2nd term
Winnipeg North Centre	James Shaver Woodsworth	Labour	1921	3rd term
Winnipeg South	John Stewart McDiarmid	Liberal	1926	1st term
Winnipeg South Centre	Joseph Thorarinn Thorson	Liberal	1926	1st term

=== New Brunswick ===
Electoral district	Name	Party	First elected/previously elected	No. of terms
Charlotte	Robert Watson Grimmer	Conservative	1921	3rd term
Gloucester	**Peter Veniot** (until 5 October 1926 emoulment appointment)	Liberal	1926	1st term
Gloucester	**Peter Veniot** (by-election of 2 November 1926)	Liberal	1926	1st term
Kent	Alfred Edmond Bourgeois	Liberal	1926	1st term
Northumberland	Charles Joseph Morrissy	Liberal	1926	1st term
Restigouche—Madawaska	Stanislas Blanchard	Liberal	1926	1st term
Royal	George Burpee Jones	Conservative	1921	3rd term
St. John—Albert*	Thomas Bell	Conservative	1925	2nd term
St. John—Albert*	Murray MacLaren	Conservative	1921	3rd term
Victoria—Carleton	James Kidd Flemming	Conservative	1925	2nd term
Victoria—Carleton	Albion Roudolph Foster (by-election of 16 June 1927)	Liberal	1927	1st term
Westmorland	Otto Baird Price	Conservative	1925	2nd term
York—Sunbury	Richard Hanson	Conservative	1921	4th term

=== Nova Scotia ===
Electoral district	Name	Party	First elected/previously elected	No. of terms
Antigonish—Guysborough	John Carey Douglas	Conservative	1917, (Note: Cape Breton South and Richmond) 1926	2nd term*
Antigonish—Guysborough	William Duff (by-election of 18 January 1927)	Liberal	1917, (Note: Lunenburg/Queens—Lunenburg) 1927	4th term*
Cape Breton North—Victoria	Lewis Wilkieson Johnstone	Conservative	1925	2nd term
Cape Breton South	Finlay MacDonald	Conservative	1925	2nd term
Colchester	George Taylor MacNutt	Conservative	1925	2nd term
Cumberland	Robert Knowlton Smith	Conservative	1925	2nd term
Digby—Annapolis	Harry Short	Conservative	1925	2nd term
Halifax*	William Anderson Black	Conservative	1923	3rd term
Halifax*	Felix Patrick Quinn	Conservative	1925	2nd term
Hants—Kings	**James Lorimer Ilsley**	Liberal	1926	1st term
Inverness	Isaac Duncan MacDougall	Conservative	1925	2nd term
Pictou	Thomas Cantley	Conservative	1925	2nd term
Queens—Lunenburg	William Gordon Ernst	Conservative	1926	1st term
Richmond—West Cape Breton	John Alexander MacDonald	Conservative	1925	2nd term
Shelburne—Yarmouth	Paul Hatfield (until 6 October 1926)	Liberal	1921	3rd term
Shelburne—Yarmouth	James Ralston (by-election of 2 November 1926)	Liberal	1926	1st term

=== Ontario ===
Electoral district	Name	Party	First elected/previously elected	No. of terms
Algoma East	Beniah Bowman	United Farmers of Ontario	1926	1st term
Algoma West	Thomas Edward Simpson	Conservative	1917	4th term
Brantford City	Robert Edwy Ryerson	Conservative	1925	2nd term
Brant	Franklin Smoke	Conservative	1925	2nd term
Bruce North	**James Malcolm** (until 22 October 1926 emoulment appointment)	Liberal	1921	3rd term
Bruce North	**James Malcolm** (by-election of 9 November 1926)	Liberal	1921	3rd term
Bruce South	Walter Allan Hall	Liberal	1925	2nd term
Carleton	William Foster Garland	Conservative	1912, 1921	4th term*
Dufferin—Simcoe	William Earl Rowe	Conservative	1925	2nd term
Durham	Fred Wellington Bowen	Conservative	1921	3rd term
Elgin West	Mitchell Hepburn	Liberal	1926	1st term
Essex East	Edmond George Odette	Liberal	1926	1st term
Essex South	Eccles James Gott	Conservative	1925	2nd term
Essex West	Sidney Cecil Robinson	Conservative	1925	2nd term
Fort William	Robert James Manion	Conservative	1917	4th term
Frontenac—Addington	John Wesley Edwards (died 18 April 1929)	Conservative	1908, 1925	5th term*
Frontenac—Addington	William Spankie (by-election of 22 July 1929)	Conservative	1929	1st term
Glengarry	Archibald John Macdonald	Liberal	1925	2nd term
Grenville—Dundas	Arza Clair Casselman	Conservative	1921, 1925	2nd term*
Grey North	William Pattison Telford	Liberal	1926	1st term
Grey Southeast	Agnes Campbell Macphail	Progressive	1921	3rd term
Haldimand	Mark Cecil Senn	Conservative	1921	3rd term
Halton	Robert King Anderson	Conservative	1917	4th term
Hamilton East	George Septimus Rennie	Conservative	1926	1st term
Hamilton West	Charles William Bell	Conservative	1925	2nd term
Hastings—Peterborough	Alexander Thomas Embury	Conservative	1925	2nd term
Hastings South	William Ernest Tummon	Conservative	1925	2nd term
Huron North	John Warwick King (died 14 January 1927)	Progressive	1921	3rd term
Huron North	George Spotton (by-election of 12 September 1927)	Conservative	1927	1st term
Huron South	Thomas McMillan	Liberal	1925	2nd term
Kenora—Rainy River	**Peter Heenan** (until 11 October 1926 emoulment appointment)	Liberal	1925	2nd term
Kenora—Rainy River	**Peter Heenan** (by-election of 2 November 1926)	Liberal	1925	2nd term
Kent	James Warren Rutherford	Liberal	1926	1st term
Kingston City	Arthur Edward Ross	Conservative	1921	3rd term
Lambton East	Burt Wendell Fansher	Progressive	1921, 1926	2nd term*
Lambton West	William Thomas Goodison (died 3 December 1928)	Liberal	1925	2nd term
Lambton West	Ross Wilfred Gray (by-election of 14 January 1929)	Liberal	1929	1st term
Lanark	Richard Franklin Preston (died 8 February 1929)	Conservative	1922	3rd term
Lanark	William Samuel Murphy (by-election of 29 July 1929)	Independent Conservative	1929	1st term
Leeds	Hugh Alexander Stewart	Conservative	1921	3rd term
Lincoln	James Dew Chaplin	Conservative	1917	4th term
London	John Franklin White	Conservative	1921	3rd term
Middlesex East	Adam King Hodgins	Conservative	1925	2nd term
Middlesex West	**John Campbell Elliott** (until 25 October 1926 ministerial appointment)	Liberal	1925	2nd term
Middlesex West	**John Campbell Elliott** (by-election of 2 November 1926)	Liberal	1925	2nd term
Muskoka—Ontario	Peter McGibbon	Conservative	1925	2nd term
Nipissing	Edmond Lapierre	Liberal	1921	3rd term
Norfolk—Elgin	William Horace Taylor	Liberal	1926	1st term
Northumberland	Milton Edgar Maybee	Conservative	1921	3rd term
Ontario	Thomas Erlin Kaiser	Conservative	1925	2nd term
Ottawa (City of)*	Edgar-Rodolphe-Eugène Chevrier	Liberal	1921, 1926	2nd term*
Ottawa (City of)*	Gordon Cameron Edwards	Liberal	1926	1st term
Oxford North	Hugh Allan	Liberal	1926	1st term
Oxford South	Thomas Merritt Cayley	Liberal	1926	1st term
Parkdale	David Spence	Conservative	1921	3rd term
Parry Sound	James Arthurs	Conservative	1908	6th term
Peel	Samuel Charters	Conservative	1917	4th term
Perth North	Francis Wellington Hay	Liberal	1926	1st term
Perth South	Frederick George Sanderson	Liberal	1925	2nd term
Peterborough West	Edward Armour Peck	Conservative	1925	2nd term
Port Arthur—Thunder Bay	Donald James Cowan	Conservative	1926	1st term
Prescott	Louis Mathias Auger (until resignation)	Liberal	1926	1st term
Prescott	Elie-Oscar Bertrand (by-election of 29 July 1929)	Liberal	1929	1st term
Prince Edward—Lennox	John Hubbs	Conservative	1921	3rd term
Renfrew North	Ira Delbert Cotnam	Conservative	1925	2nd term
Renfrew South	Martin James Maloney	Conservative	1925	2nd term
Russell	Alfred Goulet	Liberal	1925	2nd term
Simcoe East	Alfred Burke Thompson	Conservative	1925	2nd term
Simcoe North	William Alves Boys	Conservative	1921	3rd term
Stormont	Arnold Neilson Smith	Liberal	1925	2nd term
Timiskaming North	Joseph-Arthur Bradette	Liberal	1926	1st term
Timiskaming South	Malcolm Lang	Labour	1926	1st term
Toronto East	Edmond Baird Ryckman	Conservative	1921	3rd term
Toronto East Centre	Robert Charles Matthews	Conservative	1926	1st term
Toronto—High Park	Alexander James Anderson	Conservative	1925	2nd term
Toronto Northeast	Newton Manly Young	Conservative	1926	1st term
Toronto Northwest	Thomas Langton Church	Conservative	1921	3rd term
Toronto—Scarborough	Joseph Henry Harris	Conservative	1921	3rd term
Toronto South	George Reginald Geary	Conservative	1925	2nd term
Toronto West Centre	Horatio Clarence Hocken	Conservative	1917	4th term
Victoria	Thomas Hubert Stinson	Conservative	1925	2nd term
Waterloo North	**William Daum Euler** (until ministerial appointment)	Liberal	1917	4th term
Waterloo North	**William Daum Euler** (by-election of 2 November 1926)	Liberal	1917	4th term
Waterloo South	Alexander McKay Edwards	Conservative	1925	2nd term
Welland	George Hamilton Pettit	Conservative	1925	2nd term
Wellington North	Duncan Sinclair	Conservative	1925	2nd term
Wellington South	Hugh Guthrie	Conservative	1900	8th term
Wentworth	Gordon Crooks Wilson	Conservative	1911	5th term
York North	Thomas Herbert Lennox	Conservative	1925	2nd term
York South	Robert Henry McGregor	Conservative	1926	1st term
York West	Henry Lumley Drayton	Conservative	1919	4th term
York West	Earl Lawson (by-election of 29 October 1928)	Conservative	1928	1st term

=== Prince Edward Island ===
Electoral district	Name	Party	First elected/previously elected	No. of terms
King's	John Alexander Macdonald	Conservative	1925	2nd term
Prince	Alfred Edgar MacLean	Liberal	1921	3rd term
Queen's*	Robert Harold Jenkins	Liberal	1925	2nd term
Queen's*	John Ewen Sinclair	Liberal	1917, 1926	2nd term*

=== Quebec ===
Electoral district	Name	Party	First elected/previously elected	No. of terms
Argenteuil	George Halsey Perley	Conservative	1904, 1925	5th term*
Bagot	Georges Dorèze Morin (died in office)	Liberal	1925	2nd term
Bagot	Cyrille Dumaine (by-election of 27 January 1930)	Liberal	1930	1st term
Beauce	Édouard Lacroix	Liberal	1925	2nd term
Beauharnois	Maxime Raymond	Liberal	1925	2nd term
Bellechasse	Joseph Oscar Lefebre Boulanger	Liberal	1926	1st term
Berthier—Maskinongé	Joseph-Charles-Théodore Gervais	Liberal	1917	4th term
Bonaventure	Charles Marcil	Liberal	1900	8th term
Brome—Missisquoi	**William Frederic Kay**	Liberal	1911	5th term
Cartier	Samuel William Jacobs	Liberal	1917	4th term
Chambly—Verchères	Aimé Langlois	Liberal	1925	2nd term
Champlain	Arthur Lesieur Desaulniers	Liberal	1917	4th term
Charlevoix—Saguenay	Pierre-François Casgrain	Liberal	1917	4th term
Chicoutimi	Julien-Édouard-Alfred Dubuc	Independent Liberal	1925	2nd term
Châteauguay—Huntingdon	**James Alexander Robb** (until 5 October 1926 emoulment appointment)	Liberal	1908	6th term
Châteauguay—Huntingdon	**James Alexander Robb** (by-election of 2 November 1926, died 11 November 1929)	Liberal	1908	6th term
Châteauguay—Huntingdon	Dennis James O'Connor (by-election of 27 January 1930)	Liberal	1930	1st term
Compton	Joseph Étienne Letellier de Saint-Just	Liberal	1925	2nd term
Dorchester	**Lucien Cannon** (until 5 October 1926 emoulment appointment)	Liberal	1917	4th term
Dorchester	**Lucien Cannon** (by-election of 2 November 1926)	Liberal	1917	4th term
Drummond—Arthabaska	Wilfrid Girouard	Liberal	1925	2nd term
Gaspé	Rodolphe Lemieux (†)	Liberal	1896	9th term
Hochelaga	Édouard-Charles St-Père	Liberal	1921	3rd term
Hull	Joseph-Éloi Fontaine	Liberal	1917	4th term
Jacques Cartier	Joseph-Théodule Rhéaume	Liberal	1922	3rd term
Joliette	Jean-Joseph Denis (until 3 November 1928 emoulment appointment)	Liberal	1917	4th term
Joliette	Charles-Édouard Ferland (by-election of 17 December 1928)	Liberal	1928	1st term
Kamouraska	Joseph Georges Bouchard	Liberal	1922	3rd term
Labelle	Joseph Henri Napoléon Bourassa	Independent	1896, (Note: First elected as a Liberal) 1925	5th term*
Lake St. John	Armand Sylvestre	Liberal	1925	2nd term
Laprairie—Napierville	Roch Lanctôt (died 30 May 1929)	Liberal	1904	7th term
Laprairie—Napierville	Vincent Dupuis (by-election of 22 July 1929)	Liberal	1929	1st term
L'Assomption—Montcalm	Paul-Arthur Séguin	Liberal	1908	6th term
Laurier—Outremont	Joseph-Alexandre Mercier	Liberal	1925	2nd term
Laval—Two Mountains	Liguori Lacombe	Liberal	1925	2nd term
Lévis	Joseph-Étienne Dussault	Liberal	1925	2nd term
L'Islet	Joseph-Fernand Fafard	Liberal	1917	4th term
Lotbinière	Joseph-Achille Verville	Liberal	1925	2nd term
Maisonneuve	Clément Robitaille	Liberal	1921	3rd term
Matane	Georges-Léonidas Dionne	Liberal	1925	2nd term
Mégantic	Eusèbe Roberge	Liberal	1922	3rd term
Montmagny	Leo Kemner Laflamme	Liberal	1925	2nd term
Mount Royal	Robert Smeaton White	Conservative	1888, (Note: Cardwell (Ontario)) 1925	4th term*
Nicolet	Joseph-Félix Descoteaux	Liberal	1923	3rd term
Pontiac	Frank S. Cahill	Liberal	1917	4th term
Portneuf	Michel-Siméon Delisle	Liberal	1900	8th term
Québec—Montmorency	Henri-Edgar Lavigueur	Liberal	1917	4th term
Quebec East	**Ernest Lapointe** (until 5 October 1926 emoulment appointment)	Liberal	1904	8th term
Quebec East	**Ernest Lapointe** (by-election of 2 November 1926)	Liberal	1904	8th term
Quebec South	Charles Gavan Power	Liberal	1917	4th term
Quebec West	Georges Parent	Liberal	1904, (Note: Montmorency) 1917	6th term*
Richelieu	**Arthur Cardin** (until 5 October 1926 emoulment appointment)	Liberal	1911	5th term
Richelieu	**Arthur Cardin** (by-election of 2 November 1926)	Liberal	1911	5th term
Richmond—Wolfe	Edmund William Tobin	Liberal	1900	8th term
Rimouski	Eugène Fiset	Liberal	1924	3rd term
St. Ann	James John Edmund Guérin	Liberal	1925	2nd term
St. Antoine	Leslie Gordon Bell	Conservative	1925	2nd term
St. Denis	Joseph-Arthur Denis	Liberal	1921	3rd term
St. Henri	Paul Mercier	Liberal	1921	3rd term
St. Hyacinthe—Rouville	René Morin	Liberal	1921	3rd term
St. James	**Fernand Rinfret** (until 5 October 1926 Secretary of State appointment)	Liberal	1920	4th term
St. James	**Fernand Rinfret** (by-election of 2 November 1926)	Liberal	1920	4th term
St. Johns—Iberville	Aldéric-Joseph Benoit	Liberal	1922	3rd term
St. Lawrence—St. George	Charles Cahan	Conservative	1925	2nd term
St. Mary	Hermas Deslauriers	Liberal	1917	4th term
Shefford	Pierre-Ernest Boivin	Liberal	1926	1st term
Sherbrooke	Charles Benjamin Howard	Liberal	1925	2nd term
Stanstead	Willis Keith Baldwin	Liberal	1917	4th term
Témiscouata	Jean-François Pouliot	Liberal	1924	3rd term
Terrebonne	Jules-Édouard Prévost	Liberal	1917	4th term
Three Rivers—St. Maurice	Arthur Bettez	Liberal	1925	2nd term
Vaudreuil—Soulanges	Lawrence Alexander Wilson (resigned 1 February 1929)	Liberal	1925	2nd term
Vaudreuil—Soulanges	Lawrence Alexander Wilson (by-election of 29 July 1929)	Liberal	1925	2nd term
Wright	Fizalam-William Perras	Liberal	1925	2nd term
Yamaska	Aimé Boucher	Liberal	1921	4th term

=== Saskatchewan ===
Electoral district	Name	Party	First elected/previously elected	No. of terms
Assiniboia	Robert McKenzie	Liberal	1925	2nd term
Humboldt	Albert Frederick Totzke	Liberal	1925	2nd term
Kindersley	Archibald M. Carmichael	Progressive	1921	3rd term
Last Mountain	William Russell Fansher	Progressive	1925	2nd term
Long Lake	John Frederick Johnston	Liberal	1917 (Note: First elected as a Unionist)	4th term
Mackenzie	Milton Neil Campbell	Progressive	1921	3rd term
Maple Creek	George Spence (resigned 14 October 1927)	Liberal	1925	2nd term
Maple Creek	William George Bock (by-election of 25 November 1927)	Liberal	1927	1st term
Melfort	Malcolm McLean	Liberal	1925	2nd term
Melville	**William Richard Motherwell** (until 11 October 1926 emoulment appointment)	Liberal	1921	3rd term
Melville	**William Richard Motherwell** (by-election of 2 November 1926)	Liberal	1921	3rd term
Moose Jaw	John Gordon Ross	Liberal	1925	2nd term
North Battleford	Cameron Ross McIntosh	Liberal	1925	2nd term
Prince Albert	**William Lyon Mackenzie King** (until 11 October 1926 emoulment appointment)	Liberal	1908, (Note: Waterloo North (Ontario)) 1919, (Note: Prince (PEI)/York North (Ontario)) 1926	5th term*
Prince Albert	**William Lyon Mackenzie King** (by-election of 2 November 1926)	Liberal	1908, 1919, 1926	5th term*
Qu'Appelle	John Millar	Liberal-Progressive	1921	3rd term
Regina	**Charles Avery Dunning** (until 5 October 1926 emoulment appointment)	Liberal	1926	2nd term
Regina	**Charles Avery Dunning** (by-election of 2 November 1926)	Liberal	1926	2nd term
Rosetown	John Evans	Progressive	1921	3rd term
Saskatoon	Alexander MacGillivray Young	Liberal	1925	2nd term
South Battleford	John Vallance	Liberal	1925	2nd term
Swift Current	Charles Edward Bothwell	Liberal	1925	2nd term
Weyburn	Edward James Young	Liberal	1925	2nd term
Willow Bunch	Thomas F. Donnelly	Liberal	1925	2nd term
Yorkton	George Washington McPhee	Liberal	1925	2nd term

=== Yukon ===
Electoral district	Name	Party	First elected/previously elected	No. of terms
Yukon	George Black	Conservative	1921	3rd term

== By-elections ==
By-election	Date	Incumbent	Party	Winner	Party	Cause	Retained
Brandon	February 5, 1930	Robert Forke	Liberal-Progressive	Thomas Alexander Crerar	Liberal	Called to the Senate	No
Bagot	January 27, 1930	Georges Dorèze Morin	Liberal	Cyrille Dumaine	Liberal	Death	Yes
Châteauguay—Huntingdon	January 27, 1930	James Alexander Robb	Liberal	Dennis James O'Connor	Liberal	Death	Yes
Prescott	July 29, 1929	Louis-Mathias Auger	Independent Liberal	Élie-Oscar Bertrand	Liberal	Resignation following criminal charge	No
Lanark	July 29, 1929	Richard Franklin Preston	Conservative	William Samuel Murphy	Independent Conservative	Death	No
Vaudreuil-Soulanges	July 29, 1929	Lawrence Alexander Wilson	Liberal	Lawrence Alexander Wilson	Liberal	Resigned, intending to retire, but persuaded to run again	Yes
Laprairie—Napierville	July 22, 1929	Roch Lanctôt	Liberal	Vincent Dupuis	Liberal	Death	Yes
Frontenac—Addington	July 22, 1929	John Wesley Edwards	Conservative	William Spankie	Conservative	Death	Yes
Lambton West	January 14, 1929	William Goodison	Liberal	Ross Gray	Liberal	Death	Yes
Joliette	December 17, 1928	Jean-Joseph Denis	Liberal	Charles-Édouard Ferland	Liberal	Appointed a judge of the Superior Court of Quebec.	Yes
Victoria	December 6, 1928	Simon Fraser Tolmie	Conservative	D'Arcy Plunkett	Conservative	Resignation to become Premier of British Columbia.	Yes
York West	October 29, 1928	Henry Lumley Drayton	Conservative	Earl Lawson	Conservative	Appointed Chairman of the Liquor Control Board of Ontario.	Yes
Maple Creek	November 25, 1927	George Spence	Liberal	William George Bock	Liberal	Resignation to enter provincial politics in Saskatchewan	Yes
Huron North	September 12, 1927	John Warwick King	Progressive	George Spotton	Liberal	Death	No
Victoria—Carleton	June 16, 1927	James Kidd Flemming	Conservative	Albion Roudolph Foster	Liberal	Death	No
Antigonish—Guysborough	January 18, 1927	John Carey Douglas	Conservative	William Duff	Liberal	Death	No
Kootenay East	November 9, 1926	James Horace King	Liberal	James Horace King	Liberal	Recontested upon appointment as Minister of Soldiers' Civil Re-establishment	Yes
Bruce North	November 9, 1926	James Malcolm	Liberal	James Malcolm	Liberal	Recontested upon appointment as Minister of Trade and Commerce	Yes
Dorchester	November 2, 1926	Lucien Cannon	Liberal	Lucien Cannon	Liberal	Recontested upon appointment as Solicitor General	Yes
Richelieu	November 2, 1926	Arthur Cardin	Liberal	Arthur Cardin	Liberal	Recontested upon appointment as Minister of Marine and Fisheries	Yes
Regina	November 2, 1926	Charles Avery Dunning	Liberal	Charles Avery Dunning	Liberal	Recontested upon appointment as Minister of Railways and Canals.	Yes
Middlesex West	November 2, 1926	John Campbell Elliott	Liberal	John Campbell Elliott	Liberal	Recontested upon appointment as Minister of Public Works.	Yes
Waterloo North	November 2, 1926	William Daum Euler	Liberal	William Daum Euler	Liberal	Recontested upon appointment as Minister of Customs and Excise.	Yes
Brandon	November 2, 1926	Robert Forke	Liberal-Progressive	Robert Forke	Liberal-Progressive	Recontested upon appointment as Minister of Immigration and Colonization	Yes
Kenora—Rainy River	November 2, 1926	Peter Heenan	Liberal	Peter Heenan	Liberal	Recontested upon appointment as Minister of Labour	Yes
Prince Albert	November 2, 1926	William Lyon Mackenzie King	Liberal	William Lyon Mackenzie King	Liberal	Recontested upon appointment as Prime Minister.	Yes
Quebec East	November 2, 1926	Ernest Lapointe	Liberal	Ernest Lapointe	Liberal	Recontested upon appointment as Minister of Justice.	Yes
Melville	November 2, 1926	William Richard Motherwell	Liberal	William Richard Motherwell	Liberal	Recontested upon appointment as Minister of Agriculture.	Yes
Shelburne—Yarmouth	November 2, 1926	Paul Lacombe Hatfield	Liberal	James Ralston	Liberal	Called to the Senate to provide a seat for Ralston	Yes
St. James	November 2, 1926	Fernand Rinfret	Liberal	Fernand Rinfret	Liberal	Recontested upon appointment as Secretary of State of Canada.	Yes
Châteauguay—Huntingdon	November 2, 1926	James Robb	Liberal	James Robb	Liberal	Recontested upon appointment as Minister of Finance.	Yes
Edmonton West	November 2, 1926	Charles Stewart	Liberal	Charles Stewart	Liberal	Recontested upon appointment as Minister of the Interior and Mines.	Yes
Gloucester	November 2, 1926	Peter Veniot	Liberal	Peter Veniot	Liberal	Recontested upon appointment as Postmaster General.	Yes
