= 18th Canadian Parliament =

1936–1940 national legislative term

- Majority parliament
- Feb. 6, 1936 – Jan. 25, 1940

Parliament leaders
- Prime minister: William Lyon Mackenzie King; Oct. 23, 1935 – Nov. 15, 1948
- Cabinet: 16th Canadian Ministry
- Leader of the Opposition: R. B. Bennett; Oct. 23, 1935 – Jul. 6, 1938
- Robert Manion; Jul. 7, 1938 – May. 13, 1940

Party caucuses
- Government: Liberal Party
- Opposition: Conservative Party
- Crossbench: Social Credit Party
- Co-operative Commonwealth Federation
- Liberal-Progressive
- Reconstruction Party
- United Reform

House of Commons
- Seating arrangements of the House of Commons
- Speaker of the Commons: Pierre-François Casgrain; 6 February 1936 – 10 May 1940
- Members: 245 MP seats List of members

Senate
- Speaker of the Senate: Walter Edward Foster; 11 January 1936 – 8 May 1940
- Government Senate leader: Raoul Dandurand; 23 October 1935 – 11 March 1942
- Opposition Senate leader: Arthur Meighen; 22 October 1935 – 16 January 1942
- Senators: 96 senator seats List of senators

Sovereign
- Monarch: Edward VIII; Jan. 20, 1936 – Dec. 11, 1936
- George VI; Dec. 11, 1936 – Feb. 6, 1952
- Governor general: John Buchan; Nov. 2, 1935 – Feb. 11, 1940

Sessions
- 1st session 6 February 1936 – 23 June 1936
- 2nd session 14 January 1937 – 10 April 1937
- 3rd session 27 January 1938 – 1 July 1938
- 4th session 12 January 1939 – 3 June 1939
- 5th session 7 September 1939 – 13 September 1939
- 6th session 25 January 1940 – 25 January 1940
← 17th	→ 19th

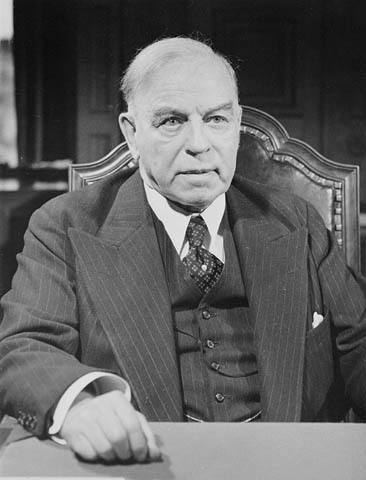
William Lyon Mackenzie King was Prime Minister during the 18th Canadian Parliament.

The 18th Canadian Parliament was in session from 6 February 1936, until 25 January 1940. The membership was set by the 1935 federal election on 14 October 1935, and it changed only somewhat due to resignations and by-elections until it was dissolved prior to the 1940 election.

It was controlled by a Liberal Party majority under Prime Minister William Lyon Mackenzie King and the 16th Canadian Ministry. The Official Opposition was the Conservative Party, led first by Richard Bedford Bennett, and later by Robert Manion.

The Speaker was Pierre-François Casgrain. See also List of Canadian electoral districts 1933-1947 for a list of the ridings in this parliament.

The Social Credit Party led by J. H. Blackmore made their first federal appearance in this parliament. It would be an important third party until 1980. The Co-operative Commonwealth Federation led by J.S. Woodsworth also made their first appearance. It, and its successor party, the New Democratic Party, would become a major source of policies that would change the fabric of Canada.

There were six sessions of the 18th Parliament, though the last two were extremely short:

Session	Start	End
1st	6 February 1936	23 June 1936
2nd	14 January 1937	10 April 1937
3rd	27 January 1938	1 July 1938
4th	12 January 1939	3 June 1939
5th	7 September 1939	13 September 1939
6th	25 January 1940	25 January 1940

== List of members ==
Following is a full list of members of the eighteenth Parliament listed first by province, then by electoral district.

Key:

- Party leaders are italicized.
- Cabinet ministers are in **boldface**.
- The Prime Minister is **both**.
- The Speaker is indicated by "(†)".

Electoral districts denoted by an asterisk (*) indicates that district was represented by two members.

=== Alberta ===
Electoral district	Name	Party	First elected/previously elected	No. of terms
Acadia	Victor Quelch	Social Credit	1935	1st term
Athabaska	Percy John Rowe	Social Credit	1935	1st term
Battle River	Robert Fair	Social Credit	1935	1st term
Bow River	Charles Edward Johnston	Social Credit	1935	1st term
Calgary East	John Landeryou	Social Credit	1935	1st term
Calgary West	Richard Bedford Bennett (resigned 28 January 1939)	Conservative	1911, 1925	5th term*
Calgary West	Douglas Cunnington (by-election of 18 September 1939)	Conservative	1939	1st term
Camrose	James Alexander Marshall	Social Credit	1935	1st term
Edmonton East	William Samuel Hall (died 26 January 1938)	Social Credit	1935	1st term
Edmonton East	Orvis A. Kennedy (by-election of 21 March 1938)	Social Credit	1938	1st term
Edmonton West	**James Angus MacKinnon**	Liberal	1935	1st term
Jasper—Edson	Walter Frederick Kuhl	Social Credit	1935	1st term
Lethbridge	John Horne Blackmore	Social Credit	1935	1st term
Macleod	Ernest George Hansell	Social Credit	1935	1st term
Medicine Hat	Archibald Hugh Mitchell	Social Credit	1935	1st term
Peace River	René-Antoine Pelletier	Social Credit	1935	1st term
Red Deer	Eric Joseph Poole	Social Credit	1935	1st term
Vegreville	William Hayhurst	Social Credit	1935	1st term
Wetaskiwin	Norman Jaques	Social Credit	1935	1st term

=== British Columbia ===
Electoral district	Name	Party	First elected/previously elected	No. of terms
Cariboo	James Gray Turgeon	Liberal	1935	1st term
Comox—Alberni	Alan Webster Neill	Independent	1921	5th term
Fraser Valley	Harry James Barber	Conservative	1925	4th term
Kamloops	Thomas O'Neill	Liberal	1935	1st term
Kootenay East	Henry Herbert Stevens	Reconstruction	1911	7th term
Kootenay East	Henry Herbert Stevens	Conservative	1911	7th term
Kootenay West	William Esling	Conservative	1925	4th term
Nanaimo	James Samuel Taylor	C.C.F.	1935	1st term
Nanaimo	James Samuel Taylor	Independent	1935	1st term
New Westminster	Thomas Reid	Liberal	1930	2nd term
Skeena	Olof Hanson	Liberal	1930	2nd term
Vancouver—Burrard	Gerry McGeer	Liberal	1935	1st term
Vancouver Centre	**Ian Alistair Mackenzie**	Liberal	1930	2nd term
Vancouver East	Angus MacInnis	C.C.F.	1930	2nd term
Vancouver North	Charles Grant MacNeil	C.C.F.	1935	1st term
Vancouver South	Howard Charles Green	Conservative	1935	1st term
Victoria	D'Arcy Plunkett (died 3 May 1936)	Conservative	1928	3rd term
Victoria	Simon Fraser Tolmie (by-election of 8 June 1936, died 13 October 1937)	Conservative	1917, 1936	5th term*
Victoria	Robert Mayhew (by-election of 29 November 1937)	Liberal	1937	1st term
Yale	Grote Stirling	Conservative	1924	5th term

=== Manitoba ===
Electoral district	Name	Party	First elected/previously elected	No. of terms
Brandon	David Wilson Beaubier (died 1 September 1938)	Conservative	1930	2nd term
Brandon	James Ewen Matthews (by-election of 14 November 1938)	Liberal	1938	1st term
Churchill	**Thomas Crerar**	Liberal	1917, (Note: Marquette (First elected as a Unionist/Progressive)) 1930, (Note: Brandon) 1935	4th term*
Dauphin	William John Ward	Liberal	1921, 1935	4th term*
Lisgar	Howard Winkler	Liberal	1935	1st term
Macdonald	William Gilbert Weir	Liberal-Progressive	1930	2nd term
Marquette	James Allison Glen	Liberal-Progressive	1926, 1935	2nd term*
Neepawa	Frederick Donald MacKenzie	Liberal	1935	1st term
Portage la Prairie	Harry Leader	Liberal	1921, (Note: First elected as a Progressive) 1935	2nd term*
Provencher	Arthur-Lucien Beaubien	Liberal	1921	5th term
Selkirk	Joseph Thorarinn Thorson	Liberal-Progressive	1926, 1935	2nd term*
Souris	George William McDonald	Liberal-Progressive	1935	1st term
Springfield	John Mouat Turner	Liberal	1935	1st term
St. Boniface	John Power Howden	Liberal	1925	4th term
Winnipeg North	Abraham Albert Heaps	C.C.F.	1935	1st term
Winnipeg North Centre	James Shaver Woodsworth	C.C.F.	1921	5th term
Winnipeg South	Leslie Mutch	Liberal	1935	1st term
Winnipeg South Centre	Ralph Maybank	Liberal	1935	1st term

=== New Brunswick ===
Electoral district	Name	Party	First elected/previously elected	No. of terms
Charlotte	Burton Hill	Liberal	1935	1st term
Gloucester	Peter Veniot (died 6 July 1936)	Liberal	1926	3rd term
Gloucester	Clarence Joseph Veniot (by-election of 17 August 1936)	Liberal	1936	1st term
Kent	Louis-Prudent-Alexandre Robichaud	Liberal	1935	1st term
Northumberland	John Patrick Barry	Liberal	1935	1st term
Restigouche—Madawaska	**Joseph-Enoil Michaud**	Liberal	1933	2nd term
Royal	Alfred Johnson Brooks	Conservative	1935	1st term
St. John—Albert	William Ryan (died 1 April 1938)	Liberal	1935	1st term
St. John—Albert	Allan McAvity (by-election of 21 February 1938)	Liberal	1938	1st term
Victoria—Carleton	Jack Patterson	Liberal	1935	1st term
Westmorland	Henry Read Emmerson	Liberal	1935	1st term
York—Sunbury	William George Clark	Liberal	1935	1st term

=== Nova Scotia ===
Electoral district	Name	Party	First elected/previously elected	No. of terms
Antigonish—Guysborough	William Duff	Liberal	1917, (Note: Lunenburg/Queens—Lunenburg) 1927	6th term*
Antigonish—Guysborough	J. Ralph Kirk (by-election of 16 March 1936)	Liberal	1936	1st term
Cape Breton North and Victoria	Daniel Alexander Cameron (died 4 September 1937)	Liberal	1935	1st term
Cape Breton North and Victoria	Matthew MacLean (by-election of 18 October 1937)	Liberal	1937	1st term
Cape Breton South	David James Hartigan	Liberal	1935	1st term
Colchester—Hants	Gordon Purdy	Liberal	1935	1st term
Cumberland	Kenneth Judson Cochrane	Liberal	1935	1st term
Digby—Annapolis—Kings	**James Lorimer Ilsley**	Liberal	1926	3rd term
Halifax*	Robert Emmett Finn	Liberal	1922, 1935	2nd term*
Halifax*	Gordon Benjamin Isnor	Liberal	1935	1st term
Inverness—Richmond	Donald MacLennan	Liberal	1935	1st term
Pictou	Henry Byron McCulloch	Liberal	1935	1st term
Queens—Lunenburg	John James Kinley	Liberal	1935	1st term
Shelburne—Yarmouth—Clare	Vincent Pottier	Liberal	1935	1st term

=== Ontario ===
Electoral district	Name	Party	First elected/previously elected	No. of terms
Algoma East	Thomas Farquhar	Liberal	1935	1st term
Algoma West	Henry Sidney Hamilton	Liberal	1935	1st term
Brantford City	William Ross Macdonald	Liberal	1935	1st term
Brant	George Wood	Liberal	1935	1st term
Broadview	Thomas Langton Church	Conservative	1921, (Note: Toronto North/Toronto Northwest) 1934	5th term*
Bruce	William Rae Tomlinson	Liberal	1935	1st term
Carleton	Alonzo Hyndman	Conservative	1935	1st term
Cochrane	Joseph-Arthur Bradette	Liberal	1926	3rd term
Danforth	Joseph Henry Harris	Conservative	1921	5th term
Davenport	John Ritchie MacNicol	Conservative	1930	2nd term
Dufferin—Simcoe	William Earl Rowe (resigned 28 September 1937 to campaign for Ontario provincial election)	Conservative	1925	4th term
Dufferin—Simcoe	William Earl Rowe (by-election of 8 November 1937)	Conservative	1925	4th term
Durham	Frank Rickard	Liberal	1935	1st term
Eglinton	Richard Langton Baker	Conservative	1925, 1930	3rd term*
Elgin	Wilson Mills	Liberal	1934	2nd term
Essex East	Paul Martin Sr.	Liberal	1935	1st term
Essex South	Murray Clark	Liberal	1935	1st term
Essex West	**Norman Alexander McLarty**	Liberal	1935	1st term
Fort William	Dan McIvor	Liberal	1935	1st term
Frontenac—Addington	Colin Campbell (resigned 28 September 1937 to campaign for Ontario provincial election)	Liberal	1934	2nd term
Frontenac—Addington	Angus Neil McCallum (by-election of 1 November 1937)	Liberal	1937	1st term
Glengarry	John David MacRae	Liberal	1935	1st term
Greenwood	Denton Massey	Conservative	1935	1st term
Grenville—Dundas	Arza Clair Casselman	Conservative	1921, 1925	5th term*
Grey—Bruce	Agnes Macphail	United Farmers of Ontario-Labour	1921	5th term
Grey North	William Pattison Telford, Jr.	Liberal	1926, 1935	2nd term*
Haldimand	Mark Senn	Conservative	1921	5th term
Halton	Hughes Cleaver	Liberal	1935	1st term
Hamilton East	Albert A. Brown	Conservative	1935	1st term
Hamilton West	Herbert Earl Wilton (died 1 February 1937)	Conservative	1935	1st term
Hamilton West	John Allmond Marsh (by-election of 22 March 1937)	Conservative	1937	1st term
Hastings—Peterborough	Rork Scott Ferguson	Liberal	1935	1st term
Hastings South	John Charles Alexander Cameron	Liberal	1935	1st term
High Park	Alexander James Anderson	Conservative	1925	4th term
Huron North	Robert Deachman	Liberal	1935	1st term
Huron—Perth	William Henry Golding	Liberal	1932	2nd term
Kenora—Rainy River	Hugh McKinnon	Liberal	1934	2nd term
Kent	James Rutherford (died 27 February 1939)	Liberal	1926	3rd term
Kent	Arthur Lisle Thompson (by-election of 11 December 1939)	Liberal	1939	1st term
Kingston City	**Norman McLeod Rogers**	Liberal	1935	1st term
Lambton—Kent	Hugh MacKenzie	Liberal	1935	1st term
Lambton West	Ross Gray	Liberal	1929	3rd term
Lanark	Thomas Alfred Thompson	Conservative	1930	2nd term
Leeds	Hugh Alexander Stewart	Conservative	1921	5th term
Lincoln	Norman Lockhart	Conservative	1935	1st term
London	Frederick Cronyn Betts (died 7 May 1938)	Conservative	1935	1st term
London	Robert James Manion (by-election of 14 November 1938)	Conservative	1917, (Note: Fort William) 1938	6th term*
Middlesex East	Duncan Graham Ross	Liberal	1935	1st term
Middlesex West	**John Campbell Elliott**	Liberal	1925	4th term
Muskoka—Ontario	Stephen Furniss	Liberal	1935	1st term
Nipissing	Raoul Hurtubise	Liberal	1930	2nd term
Norfolk	William Horace Taylor	Liberal	1926	3rd term
Northumberland	William Alexander Fraser	Liberal	1930	2nd term
Ontario	William Henry Moore	Liberal	1930	2nd term
Ottawa East	Edgar-Rodolphe-Eugène Chevrier (until judicial appointment)	Liberal	1921, 1926	4th term*
Ottawa East	Joseph Albert Pinard (by-election of 26 October 1936)	Liberal	1936	1st term
Ottawa West	T. Franklin Ahearn	Liberal	1930	2nd term
Oxford	Almon Rennie	Liberal	1934	2nd term
Parkdale	David Spence	Conservative	1921	5th term
Parry Sound	Arthur Slaght	Liberal	1935	1st term
Peel	Gordon Graydon	Conservative	1935	1st term
Perth	Fred Sanderson	Liberal	1925	4th term
Peterborough West	Joseph James Duffus	Liberal	1935	1st term
Port Arthur	**Clarence Decatur Howe**	Liberal	1935	1st term
Prescott	Élie-Oscar Bertrand	Liberal	1929	3rd term
Prince Edward—Lennox	George Tustin	Conservative	1935	1st term
Renfrew North	Matthew McKay (died in office)	Liberal	1921, 1935	2nd term*
Renfrew North	Ralph Warren (by-election of 5 April 1937)	Liberal	1937	1st term
Renfrew South	James Joseph McCann	Liberal	1935	1st term
Rosedale	Harry Gladstone Clarke	Conservative	1935	1st term
Russell	Alfred Goulet	Liberal	1925	4th term
St. Paul's	Douglas Ross	Conservative	1935	1st term
Simcoe East	George McLean	Liberal	1935	1st term
Simcoe North	Duncan Fletcher McCuaig	Liberal	1935	1st term
Spadina	Samuel Factor	Liberal	1930	2nd term
Stormont	Lionel Chevrier	Liberal	1935	1st term
Timiskaming	Walter Little	Liberal	1935	1st term
Trinity	Hugh Plaxton	Liberal	1935	1st term
Victoria	Bruce McNevin	Liberal	1935	1st term
Waterloo North	**William Daum Euler**	Liberal	1917	6th term
Waterloo South	Alexander Edwards (died 3 June 1938)	Conservative	1925	4th term
Waterloo South	Karl Kenneth Homuth (by-election of 14 November 1938)	Conservative	1938	1st term
Welland	Arthur Damude	Liberal	1935	1st term
Wellington North	John Knox Blair	Liberal	1930	2nd term
Wellington South	Robert Gladstone	Liberal	1935	1st term
Wentworth	Frank Lennard	Conservative	1935	1st term
York East	Robert Henry McGregor	Conservative	1926	3rd term
York North	William Pate Mulock	Liberal	1934	2nd term
York South	Earl Lawson	Conservative	1928	3rd term
York West	John Everett Lyle Streight	Liberal	1935	1st term

=== Prince Edward Island ===
Electoral district	Name	Party	First elected/previously elected	No. of terms
King's	Thomas Vincent Grant	Liberal	1935	1st term
Prince	Alfred Edgar MacLean (died 28 October 1939)	Liberal	1921	5th term
Prince	**James Ralston** (by-election of 2 January 1940)	Liberal	1926, (Note: Shelburne—Yarmouth (Nova Scotia)) 1940	3rd term*
Queen's*	James Larabee (until 18 December 1935 fisheries appointment)	Liberal	1935	1st term
Queen's*	Peter Sinclair Jr.	Liberal	1935	1st term
Queen's*	**Charles Avery Dunning** (by-election of 30 December 1935)	Liberal	1926, (Note: Regina (Saskatchewan)) 1935	3rd term*
Queen's*	Peter Sinclair Jr. died on 9 March 1938	Vacant		

=== Quebec ===
Electoral district	Name	Party	First elected/previously elected	No. of terms
Argenteuil	George Halsey Perley (died in office 4 January 1938)	Conservative	1904, 1925	7th term*
Argenteuil	Georges Héon (by-election of 28 February 1938)	Independent Conservative	1938	1st term
Beauce	Édouard Lacroix	Liberal	1925	4th term
Beauharnois—Laprairie	Maxime Raymond	Liberal	1925	4th term
Bellechasse	Joseph Oscar Lefebre Boulanger	Liberal	1926	3rd term
Berthier—Maskinongé	J.-Émile Ferron	Liberal	1935	1st term
Bonaventure	Charles Marcil (died 29 January 1937)	Liberal	1900	10th term
Bonaventure	Pierre-Émile Côté (by-election of 22 March 1937)	Liberal	1937	1st term
Bonaventure	Pierre-Émile Côté resigned on 6 October 1939 to enter provincial politics	Vacant		
Brome—Missisquoi	Louis Gosselin	Liberal	1935	1st term
Cartier	Samuel William Jacobs (died 21 August 1938)	Liberal	1917	6th term
Cartier	Peter Bercovitch (by-election of 7 November 1938)	Liberal	1938	1st term
Chambly—Rouville	Vincent Dupuis	Liberal	1929	3rd term
Champlain	Hervé-Edgar Brunelle	Liberal	1935	1st term
Chapleau	François Blais	Independent Liberal	1935	1st term
Charlevoix—Saguenay	Pierre-François Casgrain (†)	Liberal	1917	6th term
Chicoutimi	Alfred Dubuc	Liberal	1925	4th term
Châteauguay—Huntingdon	Donald Elmer Black	Liberal	1935	1st term
Compton	Joseph-Adéodat Blanchette	Liberal	1935	1st term
Dorchester	Léonard Tremblay	Liberal	1935	1st term
Drummond—Arthabaska	Wilfrid Girouard	Liberal	1925	4th term
Drummond—Arthabaska	Wilfrid Girouard resigned on 3 October 1939 to enter provincial politics	Vacant		
Gaspé	Maurice Brasset	Liberal	1930	2nd term
Hochelaga	Édouard-Charles St-Père	Liberal	1921	5th term
Hull	Alphonse Fournier	Liberal	1930	2nd term
Jacques Cartier	Vital Mallette (died 17 April 1939)	Liberal	1935	1st term
Jacques Cartier	Elphège Marier (by-election of 18 December 1939)	Liberal	1939	1st term
Joliette—L'Assomption—Montcalm	Charles-Édouard Ferland	Liberal	1928	3rd term
Kamouraska	Joseph Georges Bouchard	Liberal	1922	5th term
Labelle	Maurice Lalonde	Liberal	1935	1st term
Lake St-John—Roberval	Armand Sylvestre	Liberal	1925, 1935	3rd term*
Laurier	Ernest Bertrand	Liberal	1935	1st term
Laval—Two Mountains	Liguori Lacombe	Liberal	1925, 1935	3rd term*
Lévis	Joseph-Étienne Dussault	Liberal	1925, 1935	3rd term*
Lotbinière	Joseph-Achille Verville (died 20 November 1937)	Liberal	1925	4th term
Lotbinière	Joseph-Napoléon Francoeur (by-election of 27 December 1937)	Liberal	1937	1st term
Maisonneuve—Rosemont	Sarto Fournier	Liberal	1935	1st term
Matapédia—Matane	Arthur-Joseph Lapointe	Liberal	1935	1st term
Mégantic—Frontenac	Eusèbe Roberge	Liberal	1922	5th term
Mercier	Joseph Jean	Liberal	1932	2nd term
Montmagny—L'Islet	Fernand Fafard	Liberal	1917	6th term
Mount Royal	William Allen Walsh	Conservative	1935	1st term
Nicolet—Yamaska	Lucien Dubois	Liberal	1930	2nd term
Outremont	Thomas Vien	Liberal	1917, (Note: Lotbinière) 1935	3rd term*
Pontiac	Wallace McDonald	Liberal	1935	1st term
Portneuf	Lucien Cannon (until 15 January 1936 judicial appointment)	Liberal	1917, (Note: Dorchester) 1935	5th term*
Portneuf	Pierre Gauthier (by-election of 27 January 1936)	Liberal	1936	1st term
Québec—Montmorency	Wilfrid Lacroix	Liberal	1935	1st term
Quebec East	**Ernest Lapointe**	Liberal	1904	10th term
Quebec South	**Charles Gavan Power**	Liberal	1917	6th term
Quebec West and South	Charles Parent	Liberal	1935	1st term
Richelieu—Verchères	**Arthur Cardin**	Liberal	1911	7th term
Richmond—Wolfe	James Patrick Mullins	Liberal	1935	1st term
Rimouski	Eugène Fiset	Liberal	1924	5th term
Rimouski	Eugène Fiset resigned upon being named lieutenant-governor of Quebec on 13 December 1939	Vacant		
St. Ann	William James Hushion	Liberal	1924, (Note: St. Antoine) 1935	2nd term*
St. Antoine—Westmount	Robert Smeaton White	Conservative	1888, (Note: Cardwell (Ontario)) 1925	6th term*
St. Denis	Azellus Denis	Liberal	1935	1st term
St. Henry	Paul Mercier (until 30 November 1937 judicial appointment)	Liberal	1921	5th term
St. Henry	Joseph-Arsène Bonnier (by-election of 17 January 1938)	Liberal	1938	1st term
St. Hyacinthe—Bagot	Adélard Fontaine	Liberal	1930	2nd term
St. James	**Fernand Rinfret** (died 12 July 1939)	Liberal	1920	6th term
St. James	Eugène Durocher (by-election of 18 December 1939)	Liberal	1939	1st term
St. Johns—Iberville—Napierville	Martial Rhéaume	Liberal	1930	2nd term
St. Lawrence—St. George	Charles Cahan	Conservative	1925	4th term
St. Mary	Hermas Deslauriers	Liberal	1917	6th term
St-Maurice—Laflèche	Joseph-Alphida Crête	Liberal	1935	1st term
Shefford	Joseph-Hermas Leclerc	Liberal	1935	1st term
Sherbrooke	Charles Benjamin Howard	Liberal	1925	4th term
Stanstead	Robert Davidson	Liberal	1935	1st term
Témiscouata	Jean-François Pouliot	Liberal	1924	5th term
Terrebonne	Louis-Étienne Parent	Liberal	1930	2nd term
Trois-Rivières	Wilfrid Gariépy	Liberal	1935	1st term
Vaudreuil—Soulanges	Joseph Thauvette	Liberal	1930	2nd term
Verdun	Jules Wermenlinger	Conservative	1935	1st term
Wright	Fizalam-William Perras (died 28 June 1936)	Liberal	1925	4th term
Wright	Rodolphe Leduc (by-election of 3 August 1936)	Liberal	1936	1st term

=== Saskatchewan ===
Electoral district	Name	Party	First elected/previously elected	No. of terms
Assiniboia	Robert McKenzie (until 9 December 1935 Canadian Farm Loan Board appointment)	Liberal	1925	4th term
Assiniboia	**James Garfield Gardiner** (by-election of 6 January 1936)	Liberal	1936	1st term
Humboldt	Harry Raymond Fleming	Liberal	1935	1st term
Kindersley	Otto Buchanan Elliott	Social Credit	1935	1st term
Lake Centre	John Frederick Johnston	Liberal	1917, 1935	5th term*
Mackenzie	John Angus MacMillan	Liberal	1933	2nd term
Maple Creek	Charles Evans	Liberal	1935	1st term
Melfort	Malcolm McLean	Liberal	1925, 1935	3rd term*
Melville	William Richard Motherwell	Liberal	1921	5th term
Moose Jaw	J. Gordon Ross	Liberal	1925, 1935	3rd term*
North Battleford	Cameron Ross McIntosh	Liberal	1925	4th term
Prince Albert	**William Lyon Mackenzie King**	Liberal	1908, (Note: Waterloo North (Ontario)) 1919, (Note: Prince (PEI)/York North (Ontario)) 1926	7th term*
Qu'Appelle	Ernest Perley	Conservative	1930 (Note: First elected as a Liberal)	2nd term
Regina City	Donald McNiven	Liberal	1935	1st term
Rosetown—Biggar	M. J. Coldwell	C.C.F.	1935	1st term
Rosthern	Walter Tucker	Liberal	1935	1st term
Saskatoon City	Alexander MacGillivray Young (died 9 July 1939)	Liberal	1925, 1935	3rd term*
Saskatoon City	Walter George Brown (by-election of 18 December 1939)	United Reform	1939	1st term
Swift Current	Charles Edward Bothwell	Liberal	1925	4th term
The Battlefords	Joseph Needham	Social Credit	1935	1st term
Weyburn	Tommy Douglas	C.C.F.	1935	1st term
Wood Mountain	Thomas Donnelly	Liberal	1925	4th term
Yorkton	George Washington McPhee	Liberal	1925	4th term

=== Yukon ===
Electoral district	Name	Party	First elected/previously elected	No. of terms
Yukon	Martha Black	Independent Conservative	1935	1st term

== By-elections ==
By-election	Date	Incumbent	Party	Winner	Party	Cause	Retained
Prince	January 2, 1940	Alfred Edgar MacLean	Liberal	James Layton Ralston	Liberal	Death	Yes
Saskatoon City	December 18, 1939	Alexander MacGillivray Young	Liberal	Walter George Brown	United Reform Movement	Death	No
St. James	December 18, 1939	Fernand Rinfret	Liberal	Eugène Durocher	Liberal	Death	Yes
Jacques Cartier	December 18, 1939	Vital Mallette	Liberal	Elphège Marier	Liberal	Death	Yes
Kent	December 11, 1939	James Rutherford	Liberal	Arthur Lisle Thompson	Liberal	Death	Yes
Calgary West	September 18, 1939	R. B. Bennett	Conservative	Douglas Cunnington	Conservative	Resignation	Yes
Brandon	November 14, 1938	David Wilson Beaubier	Conservative	James Ewen Matthews	Liberal	Death	No
London	November 14, 1938	Frederick Cronyn Betts	Conservative	Robert James Manion	Conservative	Death	Yes
Waterloo South	November 14, 1938	Alexander Edwards	Conservative	Karl Homuth	Conservative	Death	Yes
Cartier	November 7, 1938	Samuel William Jacobs	Liberal	Peter Bercovitch	Liberal	Death	Yes
Edmonton East	March 21, 1938	William Samuel Hall	Social Credit	Orvis A. Kennedy	Social Credit	Death	Yes
Argenteuil	February 28, 1938	George H. Perley	Conservative	Georges Héon	Independent Conservative	Death	No
St. John—Albert	February 21, 1938	William Ryan	Liberal	Allan McAvity	Liberal	Death	Yes
St. Henry	January 17, 1938	Paul Mercier	Liberal	Joseph Arsène Bonnier	Liberal	Appointed a Circuit Court Judge of Montreal	Yes
Lotbinière	December 27, 1937	Joseph-Achille Verville	Liberal	Joseph-Napoléon Francoeur	Liberal	Death	Yes
Victoria	November 29, 1937	Simon Fraser Tolmie	Conservative	Robert Mayhew	Liberal	Death	No
Dufferin—Simcoe	November 8, 1937	William Earl Rowe	Conservative	William Earl Rowe	Conservative	Resignation	Yes
Frontenac—Addington	November 1, 1937	Colin Campbell	Liberal	Angus Neil McCallum	Liberal	Resignation	Yes
Cape Breton North and Victoria	October 18, 1937	Daniel Alexander Cameron	Liberal	Matthew Maclean	Liberal	Death	Yes
Renfrew North	April 5, 1937	Matthew McKay	Liberal	Ralph Warren	Liberal	Death	Yes
Hamilton West	March 22, 1937	Herbert Earl Wilton	Conservative	John Allmond Marsh	Conservative	Death	Yes
Bonaventure	March 22, 1937	Charles Marcil	Liberal	Pierre-Emile Cote	Liberal	Death	Yes
Ottawa East	October 26, 1936	Edgar-Rodolphe-Eugène Chevrier	Liberal	Joseph Albert Pinard	Liberal	Appointed a judge of the High Court of Justice of Ontario	Yes
Gloucester	August 17, 1936	Peter Veniot	Liberal	Clarence Joseph Veniot	Liberal	Death	Yes
Wright	August 3, 1936	Fizalam-William Perras	Liberal	Rodolphe Leduc	Liberal	Death	Yes
Victoria	June 8, 1936	D'Arcy Plunkett	Conservative	Simon Tolmie	Conservative	Death	Yes
Antigonish—Guysborough	March 16, 1936	William Duff	Liberal	J. Ralph Kirk	Liberal	Called to the Senate	Yes
Portneuf	January 27, 1936	Lucien Cannon	Liberal	Pierre Gauthier	Liberal	Appointed a Superior Court Judge of Quebec	Yes
Assiniboia	January 6, 1936	Robert McKenzie	Liberal	James Garfield Gardiner	Liberal	Resignation to provide a seat for Gardiner	Yes
Queen's	December 30, 1935	J. James Larabee	Liberal	Charles Avery Dunning	Liberal	Appointed a Fisheries Protection Officer	Yes
