= List of Canadian federal elections =

Canada holds general elections, colloquially referred to as federal elections since the 1940s (and as dominion elections from 1867 to the 1940s), for the purpose of determining the political leadership of its national government, the Government of Canada (or the "federal government"), through democratic means. The last general election was held in April 2025, through which the incumbent Liberal government led by new party leader Mark Carney was re-elected with a minority mandate.

This article provides a summary of results for Canadian general elections that has taken place since the nation was formed (via confederation) in 1867. Upon the call of such a general election, all seats in the Canadian House of Commons are vacated and contested in local elections to determine its new representative known as a member of Parliament (MP). As of the election held in 2025, there are 343 MPs in Canada.

== Electoral system ==
Like other Westminster-style parliamentary governments, Canadian voters exercise their democratic franchise indirectly by electing local representatives, known as members of Parliament (MPs), to the House of Commons, the lower house of the Parliament of Canada, via plurality voting (or the first-past-the-post system). All Canadian citizens age eighteen or above are entitled to vote in elections held for the electoral district they reside in. The head of the Canadian federal government, the prime minister of Canada, is typically the MP that leads the political party with the most seats in the House of Commons. They are normally chosen by virtue of being the leader of the political party with a majority of the seats in the legislature or having secured the needed support from other parties to command the confidence of Parliament.

Since 1929, Canadian federal elections have been held on Mondays, or on Tuesdays immediately after a Monday that is a statutory holiday. Section 4 of the Canadian Charter of Rights and Freedom requires that a general election be held no later than five years after the previous election. Since the end of World War II, elections are usually held every three or four years. Under the fixed-date provisions of the Canada Elections Act, a federal election must be held on the third Monday in October in the fourth calendar year after the polling day of the previous election. However, the election may occur before that date if the governor general dissolves Parliament on the recommendation of the prime minister, either for a snap election or after Parliament expresses its lack of confidence through the rejection of a supply bill (which last occurred in 1979) or the adoption of a motion of no confidence (which last occurred in 2011).

Since 1920, all elections held for the purpose of electing MPs have been administered by the chief electoral officer, who heads the independent agency Elections Canada and is accountable to Parliament rather than to the government in power. Election finances has been regulated since the 1970s, and that function was separated from Elections Canada and transferred to the commissioner of Canada Elections in 1977.

== Electoral dynamics ==
Two political parties, the Liberal Party and the Conservative Party, have been the principal contenders for power in the 21st century. The same two parties – in the Conservative Party's case, along with its various previous incarnations and factions – have dominated politics in Canada by alternating governing between them to the exclusion of all other parties at the national level. Since 1921, however, the two main parties had to contend with other forces occasionally displacing them from second place, most recently in 2011 when the New Democratic Party displaced the Liberals to become the largest opposition party in Parliament.

With only two exceptions, transitions of power between the parties have always occurred as the result of general elections. The exception were in 1873 and in 1926, when the respective incumbent Conservative and Liberal government were brought down by scandals. In 1873, the Liberals formed government and secured an electoral mandate through a general election within two months. In 1926, the Conservative Party took power but failed to win the subsequent election that took place three months later.

Since the nation was formed in 1867, Canada has held forty-five general elections. The Liberals won the most seats in twenty-six elections, in seventeen instances attaining a majority of the seats. Rival Conservatives won the most seats in nineteen elections (once under the Unionist banner), attaining a majority of the seats in thirteen instances. In one instance in 1925, the Conservatives won the most seats, but the incumbent Liberals remained in office with the support of the third-place Progressive Party. In six elections, the largest party won the most seats and formed government despite having won a smaller share of the popular vote as their main rival. That was the case with the Progressive Conservative governments formed in 1957 and in 1979, and the Liberal governments formed following the elections of 1896, 1926, 2019 and 2021.

In addition to the two main parties, there has been significant parliamentary presence of smaller parties since 1921 when the Progressive Party (and its allied United Farmers movement) displaced the Conservatives as the largest opposition party. As the principal alternative to the two main party, the Progressive Party was supplanted by the Social Credit Party and the Co-operative Commonwealth Federation (CCF) in the 1930s, both formally entering Parliament in 1935, with the CCF and its official successor the New Democratic Party (NDP) having maintained a continual presence since, while the Social Credit Party ceased to be represented as of the 1980 election.

The presence of smaller parties unsurprisingly led to occasional minority parliaments, which remained a rare event until the end of the World War II. Of the twenty elections that took place in Canada's first eight decades, only three resulted in minority parliaments. The subsequent ten elections resulted in five minority parliaments, all within a fifteen-year timespan between the 1957 and 1972 general elections. After two decades of mostly majority governments, minority parliaments become common at the start of 21st century. Six of the eight elections since 2000 have resulted in minority parliaments, including the most recent three elections.

The Progressive Conservative Party suffered the most dramatic defeat ever experienced by a sitting government in the 1993 election when it went from a majority government with 169 seats to a group without official party status, having only won two seats. The downfall of the traditional Progressive Conservative Party in the 1990s was a result of discontent manifested in the populist Reform Party in western Canada and the separatist Bloc Québécois in Quebec. The Reform Party rebranded as the Canadian Alliance in 2000 before uniting with the Progressive Conservatives in 2003 to form the modern Conservative Party, which formed government shortly after in 2006. The Green Party secured it first seat in 2011, which it has held since, but has not since been able to expand its presence in a meaningful way.

== Other lists of Canadian elections ==
- Federal by-elections – held in select electoral districts to fill vacancies midterms caused by death of resignation
- General elections are held in each province and territories to elect their respective provincial government. For a timeline of all provincial elections, see Timeline of Canadian elections.
- General elections in the Province of Canada – eight general elections were held between 1841 and 1864 in the Province of Canada, the British colony that was the largest predecessor of Canada
- Elections have been held in what is now Canada since as early as 1758, when the colony of Nova Scotia elected its first general assembly. Of the four original provinces:
  - Twenty-two general elections were held in Nova Scotia prior to Confederation
  - Twenty-one general elections were held in New Brunswick prior to Confederation, beginning in 1785
  - Thirteen general elections were held in Upper Canada (now part of Ontario) between 1792 and 1836 for the Legislative Assembly of Upper Canada
  - Fifteen elections were held in Lower Canada (now part of Quebec) between 1792 and 1834 for the Legislative Assembly of Lower Canada

== List of federal elections ==
In the following table, seats won by related predecessor or allied parties (and, in limited cases, historical parties with analogous objectives, each specifically noted) are grouped together, as follows:

Liberal	Liberal-Progressive in formal coalition (1926–1930)
Conservative	Progressive Conservative Party (1942–2000), Reform Party (1993–1997), Canadian Alliance (2000)
NDP	Independent Labour Party (1921, 1930), Cooperative Commonwealth Federation (1932–1958)
Bloc Québécois	Anti-Confederation Party (1867), Bloc populaire (1945)
Social Credit	New Democracy (1940), Ralliement créditiste (1965–1968)
Progressive	United Farmers and other farmer banners (1921–1930), Liberal-Progressive (1935–1953) (Note: When national Progressive Party no longer fielded candidates)

No. Year	Date	Resulting prime minister	Lib	Con (Note: Between 1942 and 2003, seats won by Progressive Conservative Party; second number in 1993 and 1997 are seats won by Reform Party and in 2000 by Canadian Alliance) (Note: Inclusive of seats won by MPs who contested election as Liberal-Conservative Party candidates (1867 to 1911) and as Nationalist Conservative (in 1882, 1887, 1891))	NDP (Note: From 1932 to 1958, seats won by CCF (Co-operative Commonwealth Federation))	Bloc	SoCr (Note: Second number in 1965, 1968 for seats won by Ralliement créditiste)	Prg (Note: Second number in 1921–30 for seats won by United Farmers (Alberta or Ontario) MPs, in 1935–53 for seats won by Liberal-Progressives)	Other	Total seats	Ministry's command of parliament	Turn-out %	Info
1st 1867	Aug 7– Sep 20	John A. Macdonald	62	100		18 (Note: Seat count for the Anti-Confederation Party, a regional polical force in Nova Scotia and New Brunswick opposed to union with Canada)			0	180	55.5%	74.3	(Note: The Conservative Party led by John A. Macdonald, is elected to form Canada's first government, defeating the Liberal Party and its de facto leader George Brown. Brown does not win his riding of Ontario South. In Nova Scotia, Anti-Confederates under Joseph Howe win 17 of 19 seats after campaigning against Confederation but later sit with the Liberals.)
2nd 1872	Jul 20– Oct 12	John A. Macdonald	95	100 (Note: Includes one Conservative Labour candidate)					5	200	50%	70.3	(Note: Prime Minister Macdonald's Conservatives are re-elected with a minority, defeating Liberals and their de facto leader Edward Blake.)
3rd 1874	Jan 20	Alexander Mackenzie	129	65					12	206	62.6%	69.6	(Note: The Liberals, led by Prime Minister Alexander Mackenzie, retain power with a majority after having formed a government after the Conservatives, under former prime minister John A. Macdonald, lost the confidence of the House in 1873. First federal election by secret ballot.)
4th 1878	Sep 17	John A. Macdonald	63	134					9	206	65%	69.1	(Note: Former prime minister John A. Macdonald's Conservative Party defeats Prime Minister Mackenzie's Liberals, returning Macdonald to power with a second majority.)
5th 1882	June 20	John A. Macdonald	73	134					4	211	63.5%	70.3	(Note: Prime Minister Macdonald's Conservatives win re-election with a third majority, defeating the Liberals under Blake.)
6th 1887	Feb 20	John A. Macdonald	80	124					11	215	57.7%	70.1	(Note: Prime Minister Macdonald's Conservatives win re-election with a fourth majority, defeating the Liberals under Blake.)
7th 1891	March 5	John A. Macdonald	90	118					7	215	54.9%	64.4	(Note: Prime Minister Macdonald's Conservatives win re-election with a fifth majority. Macdonald defeats Liberal opposition leader Wilfrid Laurier in Laurier's first election as party leader. In the June following the election, Macdonald dies in office.)
8th 1896	June 23	Wilfrid Laurier	117	86					10	213	54.9%	62.9	(Note: Laurier's Liberals win a majority government, defeating the Conservatives, led by Prime Minister Charles Tupper, despite losing the popular vote.)
9th 1900	Nov 7	Wilfrid Laurier	128	79					6	213	60.1%	77.4	(Note: Prime Minister Laurier's Liberals win re-election with a second majority, defeating former prime minister Tupper's Conservatives. Tupper loses his own seat of Cape Breton.)
10th 1904	Nov 3	Wilfrid Laurier	137	75					2	214	64%	71.6	(Note: Prime Minister Laurier's Liberals win re-election with a third majority, defeating Robert Borden's Conservatives.)
11th 1908	Oct 26	Wilfrid Laurier	133	85					3	221	60.2%	70.0	(Note: Prime Minister Laurier's Liberals defeat Borden's Conservatives to win their fourth consecutive majority mandate.)
12th 1911	Sep 21	Robert Borden	85	132					4	221	59.7%	70.2	(Note: Borden's Conservatives defeat Prime Minister Laurier's Liberals and win a majority mandate.)
13th 1917	Dec 17	Robert Borden	82	153					0	235	65.1%	75.0	(Note: Prime Minister Borden leads the Unionist Party, a pro-conscription coalition of Conservatives and former Liberals, to a majority victory. Both former Conservatives and former Liberals are appointed to the cabinet. The coalition defeats former prime minister Laurier's anti-conscription Liberals.)
14th 1921	Dec 6	William Lyon; Mackenzie King	118	49	3 (Note: MPs who contested election under "Independent Labour" banner)			58 +3	7	235	50.2%	67.7	(Note: William Lyon Mackenzie King's Liberals win a minority government, defeating Prime Minister Arthur Meighen's Conservatives. The Conservatives are reduced to third place in the House; Meighen loses his own seat of Portage la Prairie. After Thomas Crerar and his Progressive Party decline the title of Official Opposition, Meighen becomes opposition leader.)
15th 1925	Oct 26	William Lyon; Mackenzie King (Note: Subject to debate: King remained Prime Minister in the months following, and Conservative leader Meighen assumed premiership in June 1926. See King–Byng affair for more info.)	100	115				22 +2	6	245	40.8%	66.4	(Note: Prime Minister Mackenzie King's Liberals hold power with a minority with the help of Robert Forke's Progressives, despite former prime minister Meighen's Conservatives winning more seats, including that of King's own riding of York North. The Progressives soon withdraw support from the scandal-plagued Liberals but also refuse to support the Conservatives. Governor General Lord Byng controversially appoints Meighen as prime minister in the King–Byng Affair, but the Conservative government soon falls in a non-confidence vote.)
16th 1926	Sep 14	William Lyon; Mackenzie King	116 +8 (Note: Progressive MPs elected under Liberal-Progressive banner, as a group splintered from rest of Progressive Party MPs and entered into formal coalition with the governing Liberals, caucused with the Liberals and leader Robert Forke served in cabinet)	91				11 +12	7	245	47.3%	67.7	(Note: Mackenzie King's Liberals defeat former prime minister Meighen's Conservatives, winning a minority supported by the eight Liberal-Progressives under Forke. Meighen loses his Portage la Prairie seat again. United Farmers parties take 12 seats and Labour four, giving Canada a rare Parliament with six parties, each with four seats or more, in the House.)
17th 1930	July 28	R. B. Bennett	88 +3 (Note: Progressive MPs elected under Liberal-Progressive banner with no Liberal challenger, and caucused with the Liberals.)	134	2			3 +9	7	245	54.7%	73.5	(Note: R. B. Bennett's Conservatives win a majority, defeating the Liberals under Prime Minister Mackenzie King.)
18th 1935	Oct 14	William Lyon; Mackenzie King	173	39	7		17	4 (Note: MPs elected under Liberal-Progressive banner. The national Progressive Party ceased fielding candidate as of 1935 election, with its many of former members scattered to contest election mainly under banner of Co-operative Commonwealth Federation and other parties.)	5	245	70.6%	74.2	(Note: Former prime minister Mackenzie King's Liberals defeat Prime Minister Bennett's Conservatives with a majority. Two new parties based in the West field candidates for the first time: the Co-operative Commonwealth Federation (CCF), led by J. S. Woodsworth, wins seven seats on a platform of social reform, while the new Social Credit Party, led in Parliament by John Horne Blackmore (its most recognized leader, William Aberhart, is serving as Premier of Alberta), wins 17 seats with its platform of monetary reform. The Progressive Party and the United Farmers of Alberta pass into the history books.)
19th 1940	March 26	William Lyon; Mackenzie King	179	39 (Note: Includes results for the National Government party.)	8		10 (Note: Includes three MPs elected under New Democracy banner)	3	6	245	73.1%	69.9	(Note: Prime Minister Mackenzie King's Liberals are re-elected with a majority, defeating Robert Manion's National Government party, a failed attempt to recreate Robert Borden's World War I–era Unionists. Manion, previously the MP for London, runs without success at Fort William.)
20th 1945	June 11	William Lyon; Mackenzie King	118 +8 (Note: Seat won by Independent Liberals in protest of Liberal government's decision to implement conscription, but supported subsequent Liberal minorty government and eventually rejoined party)	66	28	2 (Note: Seats won by Bloc populaire, which only ran candidates in Quebec on platform against conscription)	13	1	9	245	48.2%	75.3	(Note: Prime Minister Mackenzie King's Liberals are re-elected with a minority, defeating the newly renamed Progressive Conservatives, led by John Bracken. Despite his party's nationwide victory, King loses his Prince Albert riding. Foreshadowing the Bloc Québécois, the Bloc populaire canadien wins two seats in Quebec on a platform of Quebec nationalism and opposition to conscription.)
21st 1949	June 27	Louis St. Laurent	191	41	13		10	1	6	262	72.9%	73.8	(Note: New prime minister Louis St. Laurent leads the Liberals to victory with a majority, defeating George A. Drew's Progressive Conservatives.)
22nd 1953	Aug 10	Louis St. Laurent	169	51	23		15	1	6	265	63.8%	67.5	(Note: Prime Minister St-Laurent's Liberals win re-election with a majority, defeating Drew's Progressive Conservatives.)
23rd 1957	June 10	John Diefenbaker	105	112	25		19		4	265	42.2%	74.1	(Note: John Diefenbaker's Progressive Conservatives defeat Prime Minister St-Laurent's Liberals with an upset minority victory despite losing the popular vote.)
24th 1958	March 31	John Diefenbaker	49	208	8				–	265	78.5%	79.4	(Note: Prime Minister Diefenbaker's Progressive Conservatives are re-elected and win the largest majority (as of 2025) in Canadian history, defeating the Liberals and their new leader, Lester B. Pearson. Social Credit loses all its seats (including leader Solon Earl Low's Peace River) and the CCF loses most of its own (including leader M. J. Coldwell's Rosetown—Biggar).)
25th 1962	June 18	John Diefenbaker	99	116	19		30		1	265	43.8%	79.0	(Note: Prime Minister Diefenbaker leads the Progressive Conservatives to a minority government, with a margin of victory over Pearson's Liberals of only one quarter of a percentage point in the popular vote. The New Democratic Party, which evolved from the CCF, wins 19 seats but fails to achieve a hoped-for breakthrough under Tommy Douglas. Robert N. Thompson makes his debut as leader of Social Credit, which makes only a modest recovery in the West but unprecedented gains in Quebec.)
26th 1963	April 8	Lester Pearson	128	95	17		24		1	265	48.3%	79.2	(Note: Pearson's Liberals win a minority mandate, defeating Prime Minister Diefenbaker's Progressive Conservatives.)
27th 1965	Nov 8	Lester Pearson	131	97	21		5 +9		2	265	49.4%	74.8	(Note: Prime Minister Pearson's Liberals win re-election with a second minority, defeating former prime minister Diefenbaker's Progressive Conservatives. Social Credit splits in 1963, with French-speaking, mostly Quebec-based supporters under Réal Caouette forming the Ralliement créditiste, while English-speaking Western supporters under Thompson remain under the "classic" banner. Most social credit movement supporters in Parliament serve with the Ralliement créditiste. Douglas' NDP moves into third place in the number of House seats.)
28th 1968	June 25	Pierre Trudeau	155	72	22		0 +14		1	264	58.7%	75.7	(Note: New prime minister Pierre Trudeau leads the Liberals to a majority victory, defeating the Progressive Conservatives under Robert Stanfield.)
29th 1972	Oct 30	Pierre Trudeau	109	107	31		15		2	264	41.3%	76.7	(Note: Prime Minister P. Trudeau's Liberals are re-elected but with a minority, winning only two more seats than Stanfield's Progressive Conservatives despite winning the popular vote by more than three percentage points nationwide. The NDP pick up several seats under new leader David Lewis. Social Credit, now reunited under Caouette's leadership, maintains its support in Quebec.)
30th 1974	July 8	Pierre Trudeau	141	95	16		11		1	264	53.4%	71.0	(Note: Prime Minister P. Trudeau's Liberals defeat Stanfield's Progressive Conservatives with a second majority.)
31st 1979	May 22 (Note: Election held on a Tuesday immediately following a Monday that was a statutory holiday)	Joe Clark	114	136	26		6		0	282	48.2%	75.7	(Note: Joe Clark's Progressive Conservatives defeat the Liberals, led by Prime Minister P. Trudeau, and win a minority government, despite winning a significantly smaller share of the vote than the Liberals. Ed Broadbent makes his debut as leader of the NDP, and Fabien Roy makes his debut as leader of Social Credit.)
32nd 1980	Feb 18	Pierre Trudeau	147	103	32				0	282	52.1%	69.3	(Note: Former prime minister P. Trudeau's Liberals defeat the Progressive Conservatives, led by Prime Minister Clark. For the first time since 1958, Social Credit fails to elect any MPs and so fades into history after an almost unbroken 45-year run of federal representation, leaving Canada with a three-party system.)
33rd 1984	Sep 4	Brian Mulroney	40	211	30				1	282	74.8%	75.3	(Note: Brian Mulroney led Progressive Conservatives won a landslide victory, ousting the Liberals led by John Turner, rendering Turner the Prime Minister with the second shortest tenure and the second Prime Minister who held no parliamentary seat while Prime Minister. The PCs' 211 seats remained to date the most number of seats won by any party, and the government formed had the second strongest command of parliament in Canadian history. The Liberals' performance was its worst to that point.)
34th 1988	Nov 21	Brian Mulroney	83	169	43				0	295	57.3%	75.3	(Note: Prime Minister Mulroney's Progressive Conservatives win a second majority, diminished from 1984 due to contending with a much stronger performance from the Liberals under former prime minister Turner and a strong third-party showing from Broadbent's New Democrats. As of 2025, this is the most recent federal general election where only three parties returned all the members of Parliament. Led by Preston Manning, the right-wing, Western-based Reform Party contests its first election but fails to win any seats.)
35th 1993	Oct 25	Jean Chrétien	177	2 +52	9	54			1	295	60%	69.6	(Note: Jean Chrétien's Liberals win a majority, soundly defeating the Progressive Conservatives, led by new prime minister Kim Campbell, who are left in fifth place with just two seats, their worst ever showing. The Bloc Québécois, founded in 1990 and led by ex-Mulroney cabinet minister Lucien Bouchard, becomes the Official Opposition. Reform becomes the third party. Audrey McLaughlin's New Democrats also post their worst results to this point with just nine seats. The election marks the end of the predominantly three-party Liberal–Progressive Conservative–NDP system.)
36th 1997	June 2	Jean Chrétien	155	20 +60	21	44			1	301	51.5%	67.0	(Note: Prime Minister Chrétien's Liberals are re-elected with a second, albeit much slimmer, majority. Manning's Reform Party becomes the Official Opposition as the Bloc Québécois falls to third place under new leader Gilles Duceppe. The NDP, led by Alexa McDonough, and the Progressive Conservatives, led by Jean Charest, both make gains.)
37th 2000	Nov 27	Jean Chrétien	172	12 +66	13	38			0	301	57.1%	64.1	(Note: Prime Minister Chrétien's Liberals are re-elected with a third majority, defeating Stockwell Day's Canadian Alliance, the unsuccessful attempt to unite the Reform Party and Progressive Conservatives. Both the Liberals and Alliance gain seats at the expense of the Bloc under Duceppe, NDP under McDonough, and PCs under former prime minister Clark.)
38th 2004	June 28	Paul Martin	135	99	19	54			1	308	43.8%	60.9	(Note: Prime Minister Paul Martin led Liberals secured re-election but was reduced to a minority. The reconstituted Conservative Party, formed by a merger of Progressive Conservatives and Canadian Alliance, contested its first election led by Stephen Harper. Bloc led by Gilles Duceppe for the third time increase its seat count from 38 to 54, matching the party's record at its debut in 1993. NDP led by new leader Jack Layton increased its seat count by half but Layton was defeated locally.)
39th 2006	Jan 23	Stephen Harper	103	124	29	51			1	308	40.3%	64.7	(Note: Stephen Harper led Conservatives defeated incumbent Liberals led by Prime Minister Paul Martin and formed the first government of the reconstituted party. The government formed was, and remained to date, the Canadian government with the weakest command of parliament ever. Jack Layton led the NDP to increas its seat count by half for the second time.)
40th 2008	Oct 14	Stephen Harper	77	143	37	49			2	308	46.4%	58.8	(Note: Prime Minister Harper's Conservatives won a second minority government, defeating Stéphane Dion led Liberals by larger margins than in 2006. BQ maintained vote share and seat counts. NDP increase seat count from 30 to 37 despite gaining less than 1% in popular vote. Greens under new leader Elizabeth May expanded its vote share by 50% but again failed to win any seats.)
41st 2011	May 2	Stephen Harper	34	166	103	4			1	308	53.9%	61.1	(Note: Prime Minister Harper led the Conservatives to their third victory and first majority mandate. NDP led by Jack Layton form Official Opposition for the first time in the party's history. Liberals led by Michael Ignatieff fall to third place, their worst ever showing and the only time to date where they failed to form government or lead opposition. The Bloc Québécois collapsed from 47 to 4 seats. The Green Party won its first seat, that of leader Elizabeth May.)
42nd 2015	Oct 19	Justin Trudeau	184	99	44	10			1	338	54.4%	68.3	(Note: Justin Trudeau led Liberals leapfrogged form from third place to government, ousting Conservatives Prime Minister Stephen Harper, and became the first child of a previous Prime Minister to become Prime Minister.)
43rd 2019	Oct 21	Justin Trudeau	157	121	24	32			4	338	46.4%	67.0	(Note: Prime Minister J. Trudeau's Liberals won a minority government with smaller share of popular vote than the Conservatives led by Andrew Scheer. This was the second time in Canadian history the government was formed by a party with less than 35% of the popular vote.)
44th 2021	Sep 20	Justin Trudeau	160	119	25	32			2	338	47.3%	62.3	(Note: Prime Minister J. Trudeau's Liberals won minority mandate for the second time despite winning smaller share of popular vote than the Conservatives led by Erin O'Toole. Bloc Québécois, NDP and Green largely maintained their presents in Parliament. Green Party leader Annamie Paul came in fourth locally in Toronto Centre after extended acromonious infighting. People's Party leader Bernier again failed to win seat.)
45th 2025	April 28	Mark Carney	169	144	7	22			1	343	49.3%	69.5	(Note: Former Bank of Canada and Bank of England Governor Mark Carney led Liberals to minority victory while a first time candidate for any public office, the first person with no prior electoral experience to lead a party to victory. Conservatives led by Pierre Poilievre won over 40% share of popular vote, a new watermark for the modern Conservative Party, but failed to form government, the first time a party with more than 40% popular vote not forming government since 1979 when Liberal Prime Minister Pierre Trudeau with 40.1% was ousted by Progressive Conservative Joe Clark with 35.9%. NDP lost official party status for the first time since 1993 and its leader Jagmeet Singh was defeated locally.)

== Graphs of results ==
=== Share of seats (stacked bars) ===
Canada's general elections – Seat share
Year	Share of seats	Total
1867		180
1872		200
1874		206
1878		206
1882		211
1887		215
1891		215
1896		213
1900		213
1904		214
1908		221
1911		221
1917		235
1921		235
1925		245
1926		245
1930		245
1935		245
1940		245
1945		245
1949		262
1953		265
1957		265
1958		265
1962		265
1963		265
1965		265
1968		264
1972		264
1974		264
1979		282
1980		282
1984		282
1988		295
1993		295
1997		301
2000		301
2004		308
2006		308
2008		308
2011		308
2015		338
2019		338
2021		338
2025		343
	Liberal; Lib.-Prog. Progressive; Green NDP CCF; Labour; Anti-Confed. Ind./Others Conservative/PC; Reform/Alliance; Bloc Quebecois; Social Credit

== See also ==
- List of political parties in Canada
- Voter turnout in Canada
