= David Wilson Beaubier =

Canadian politician

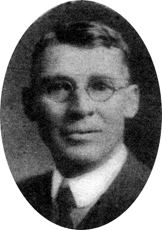

Member of the Canadian Parliament for Brandon
- In office 1930–1938
- Preceded by: Thomas Alexander Crerar
- Succeeded by: James Ewen Matthews

Personal details
- Born: May 2, 1864 St. Mary's, Province of Canada
- Died: September 1, 1938 (aged 74)
- Party: historical Conservative Party
- Occupation: Businessman farmer

David Wilson Beaubier (May 2, 1864 in St. Mary's, Province of Canada – September 1, 1938) was a Canadian politician. Beaubier ran in the elections of 1925 and 1926 but lost both to Robert Forke. He was elected to the House of Commons of Canada in the 1930 election as a Member of the historical Conservative Party for the riding of Brandon. He was re-elected in 1935. Prior to his federal political experience, he was a Lieutenant-Colonel during World War I in which he led the 181st Battalion, CEF into England in 1916.
