= Thomas William Bird =

Canadian politician

Member of the Canadian Parliament for Nelson
- In office 1921–1930
- Preceded by: John Archibald Campbell
- Succeeded by: Bernard Munroe Stitt

Personal details
- Born: May 4, 1883 Killington, Westmorland, England, United Kingdom
- Died: June 9, 1958 (aged 75) St. Thomas, Ontario, Canada
- Party: Progressive Party
- Occupation: clergyman

Thomas William Bird (May 4, 1883 – June 9, 1958) was a politician and clergyman. He was elected to the House of Commons of Canada in 1921 as a Member of the Progressive Party to represent the riding of Nelson. He was re-elected in 1925 and again in 1926 then defeated in 1930. He died a natural death late in his life.

Bird played an unexpectedly pivotal role in the King–Byng Affair, paired with an absent pro-government Progressive MP, voted against the government, stating immediately afterward that he had not noticed a fellow MP's exit from the house, and that as he was paired with that MP, that he should not have voted against the government. This resulted in the non-confidence motion being passed by a single vote and the government falling as a result.
