= Thomas Donnelly (Saskatchewan politician) =

Canadian politician

Member of Parliament for Willow Bunch
- In office October 1925 – October 1935
- Preceded by: riding created
- Succeeded by: riding dissolved

Member of Parliament for Wood Mountain
- In office October 1935 – April 1945
- Preceded by: riding created
- Succeeded by: Hazen Argue

Personal details
- Born: Thomas F. Donnelly; 1 January 1874 New Carlisle, Quebec, Canada
- Died: 9 October 1948 (aged 74)
- Party: Liberal
- Spouse(s): Charlotte Jane Kennedy m. 18 August 1905
- Profession: physician, principal, teacher

Thomas F. Donnelly (1 January 1874 – 9 October 1948) was a Liberal party member of the House of Commons of Canada. He was born in New Carlisle, Quebec and became a physician, principal and teacher.

Donnelly attended Bishop's University and McGill University, attaining a Masters of Arts degree. For three years, he was principal for the high school in Lennoxville, and taught for another three years at Westmount Academy.

He was first elected to Parliament at the Willow Bunch riding in the 1925 general election then re-elected there in 1926 and 1930. When riding boundaries were revised in 1933, Donnelly sought election at Wood Mountain which he won in the 1935 election. He was re-elected for one further term in 1940 after which he did not seek another term in Parliament.
