= Nelson (federal electoral district) =

Former federal electoral district in Manitoba, Canada

Nelson was a federal electoral district that was represented in the House of Commons of Canada from 1917 to 1935. It covered northern Manitoba, Canada, a vast wilderness area dotted with small municipalities and First Nations reserves.

The riding was created in 1914 from parts of Dauphin riding. When Nelson was abolished in 1933, its entire area was transferred into the new riding of Churchill.

== Members of Parliament ==
This riding elected the following members of the House of Commons of Canada:

- 1917-1921: John Archibald Campbell - Unionist
- 1921-1930: Thomas William Bird - Progressive
- 1930-1935: Bernard Stitt - Conservative

== Election results ==
1917 Canadian federal election
Party	Candidate	Votes
Government (Unionist)	CAMPBELL, John Archibald	acclaimed

1921 Canadian federal election
Party	Candidate	Votes
Progressive	BIRD, Thomas William	2,814
Conservative	ROTHWELL, Benjamin Edward	1,319

1925 Canadian federal election
Party	Candidate	Votes
Progressive	BIRD, Thomas William	2,485
Conservative	MYERS, Joseph	2,143

1926 Canadian federal election
Party	Candidate	Votes
Progressive	BIRD, Thomas William	3,042
Conservative	MYERS, Joseph	2,632

1930 Canadian federal election
Party	Candidate	Votes
Conservative	STITT, Bernard Munroe	4,741
Progressive	BIRD, Thomas William	4,067

== See also ==
- List of Canadian electoral districts
- Historical federal electoral districts of Canada
