= Bernard Munroe Stitt =

Canadian politician

Bernard Monroe Stitt

Member of the Canadian Parliament for Nelson
- In office 1930–1935
- Preceded by: Thomas William Bird
- Succeeded by: riding abolished

Personal details
- Born: October 17, 1880 Spencerville, Ontario, Canada
- Died: March 21, 1942 (aged 61) Winnipeg, Manitoba, Canada
- Party: Conservative Party
- Occupation: forest engineer
- Website: Bernard Munroe Stitt – Parliament of Canada biography

Bernard Monroe "Barney" Stitt, (October 17, 1880 – March 21, 1942), was a Canadian politician.

He was born in Spencerville, Ontario. He moved to The Pas, Manitoba in 1909 and worked as a forest engineer. He enlisted in the Canadian Expeditionary Force during World War I and served in Europe.

Returning to The Pas after the war he served as mayor from 1921 to 1930 when he was elected to the House of Commons of Canada in the 1930 federal election representing Nelson for the Conservatives. He ran in the 1935 federal election in the redistributed riding of Churchill but was defeated by Liberal Thomas Crerar.

After leaving politics, he became a hotel owner.

1935 Canadian federal election: Churchill
Party	Candidate	Votes	%
Liberal	Thomas Crerar	3,603	40.0
Conservative	Barney M. Stitt	3,091	34.3
Co-operative Commonwealth	Alexander Stewart	2,313	25.7
Total valid votes		9,007	100.0
