= Brandon (electoral district) =

Former federal electoral district in Manitoba, Canada

Brandon was a federal electoral district in the province of Manitoba, Canada, that was represented in the House of Commons of Canada from 1896 to 1953. It was created in 1892 from parts of Marquette and Selkirk ridings. In 1952, the constituency was merged with the constituency of Souris to form the district of Brandon—Souris.

== Members of Parliament ==
This riding has elected the following members of Parliament:

- 1896: D'Alton McCarthy - McCarthyite
- 1896-1911: Sir Clifford Sifton - Liberal
- 1911-1917: James Albert Manning Aikins - Conservative Party of Canada
- 1917-1921: Howard P. Whidden - Unionist Party
- 1921-1930: Robert Forke - Progressive Party of Canada (1921–1926), Liberal-Progressive (1926–1930)
- 1930: Thomas Alexander Crerar - Liberal
- 1930-1938: David Wilson Beaubier - Conservative Party of Canada
- 1938-1950: James Ewen Matthews - Liberal
- 1951-1952: Walter Dinsdale - Progressive Conservative

== Election results ==
By-election: On the death of Mr. Matthews' on 24 November 1950

By-election on 25 June 1951
Party	Candidate	Votes
Progressive Conservative	Walter Dinsdale	11,124
Liberal	J.W. Grant MacEwan	8,371

1949 Canadian federal election
Party	Candidate	Votes
Liberal	James Ewen Matthews	11,263
Progressive Conservative	John Bracken	7,150
Independent	Dwight Lyman Jackson	1,964

1945 Canadian federal election
Party	Candidate	Votes
Liberal	James Ewen Matthews	6,870
Progressive Conservative	Frederick Henry Young	5,621
Co-operative Commonwealth	Alexander MacDonald Brown	5,294
Labor–Progressive	Albert Edward Smith	497

1940 Canadian federal election
Party	Candidate	Votes
Liberal	James Ewen Matthews	8,908
National Government	John William McLeod Thompson	6,168
Co-operative Commonwealth	James Henry Wood	2,609

By-election: On the death of Mr. Beaubier on 1 September 1938

By-election on 14 November 1938
Party	Candidate	Votes
Liberal	James Ewen Matthews	6,583
Conservative	George Baubier	5,600
Co-operative Commonwealth	James Henry Wood	3,577

1935 Canadian federal election
Party	Candidate	Votes
Conservative	David Wilson Beaubier	6,575
Liberal	James Ewen Matthews	6,368
Co-operative Commonwealth	James Henry Wood	3,396
Reconstruction	Cecil Evadne Leech	556

1930 Canadian federal election
Party	Candidate	Votes
Conservative	David Wilson Beaubier	8,512
Liberal	Thomas Alexander Crerar	6,457
Labour	Beatrice Alice Brigden	1,331

By-election: On the appointment of Mr. Forke to the senate on 30 December 1929

By-election on 5 February 1930
Party	Candidate	Votes
Liberal	Thomas Alexander Crerar	Acclaimed

By-election: On the appointment of Mr. Forke as Minister of Immigration and Colonization on 5 October 1926

By-election on 2 November 1926
Party	Candidate	Votes
Liberal–Progressive	Robert Forke	Acclaimed

1926 Canadian federal election
Party	Candidate	Votes
Liberal–Progressive	Robert Forke	8,267
Conservative	David Wilson Beaubier	7,101

1925 Canadian federal election
Party	Candidate	Votes
Progressive	Robert Forke	6,411
Conservative	David Wilson Beaubier	5,428

1921 Canadian federal election
Party	Candidate	Votes
Progressive	Robert Forke	9,596
Conservative	Charles Edmund Ivens	4,067
Liberal	Frederick Charles Cox	404

1917 Canadian federal election
Party	Candidate	Votes
Government (Unionist)	Howard Primrose Whidden	11,465
Opposition (Laurier Liberals)	Hugh Savigny Patterson	1,329

1911 Canadian federal election
Party	Candidate	Votes
Conservative	James Albert Manning Aikins	4,436
Liberal	Alfred Edward Hill	3,570

1908 Canadian federal election
Party	Candidate	Votes
Liberal	Clifford Sifton	3,567
Conservative	Thomas Mayne Daly	3,498
Independent	Benjamin D'Arcy Wallace	100

1904 Canadian federal election
Party	Candidate	Votes
Liberal	Clifford Sifton	3,625
Independent	R.L. Richardson	2,804

1900 Canadian federal election
Party	Candidate	Votes
Liberal	Clifford Sifton	5,011
Conservative	Hugh John Macdonald	4,342

By-election: Mr McCarthy elected to sit for Simcoe North on 25 August 1896

By-election on 27 November 1896
Party	Candidate	Votes
Liberal	Clifford Sifton	Acclaimed

1896 Canadian federal election
Party	Candidate	Votes
McCarthyite	D'Alton McCarthy	3,073
Conservative	W.A. McDonald	2,738
Patrons of Industry	W. Postlethwaite	1,102

== See also ==
- Brandon—Souris
- List of Canadian electoral districts
- Historical federal electoral districts of Canada
