= Willow Bunch (federal electoral district) =

Former federal electoral district in Saskatchewan, Canada

Willow Bunch was a federal electoral district in Saskatchewan, Canada, that was represented in the House of Commons of Canada from 1925 to 1935. This riding was created in 1924 from parts of Maple Creek, Moose Jaw and Swift Current ridings

It was abolished in 1933 when it was redistributed into Moose Jaw, Swift Current and Wood Mountain ridings.

== Election results ==
1925 Canadian federal election
Party	Candidate	Votes
Liberal	DONNELLY, Thomas	5,506
Progressive	JOHNSON, Robert Milton	3,861
Conservative	MACKINNON, Alexander Edward	1,790

1926 Canadian federal election
Party	Candidate	Votes
Liberal	DONNELLY, Thomas	7,683
Progressive	EMERY, Charles Morley Wilki	3,123
Conservative	MARCOTTE, Joseph Arthur	2,263

1930 Canadian federal election
Party	Candidate	Votes
Liberal	DONNELLY, Thomas F.	9,730
Conservative	HOATH, Robert Bingham	8,992

== See also ==
- List of Canadian electoral districts
- Historical federal electoral districts of Canada
