= Wood Mountain (electoral district) =

Former federal electoral district in Saskatchewan, Canada

Wood Mountain was a federal electoral district in Saskatchewan, Canada, that was represented in the House of Commons of Canada from 1935 to 1949. This riding was created in 1933 from parts of Willow Bunch riding. It was abolished in 1947 when it was redistributed into Assiniboia, Maple Creek and Swift Current ridings.

== Election results ==
1935 Canadian federal election
Party	Candidate	Votes
Liberal	DONNELLY, Thomas F.	6,092
Social Credit	WARREN, Herman Kerster	4,584
Co-operative Commonwealth	CRAIG, William Wesley	2,864
Conservative	HOATH, Robert Bingham	1,446

1940 Canadian federal election
Party	Candidate	Votes
Liberal	DONNELLY, Thomas F.	6,375
Co-operative Commonwealth	BUCHANAN, Niles Leonard	5,247
Independent	ELLISON, Alban Cedric	3,775

1945 Canadian federal election
Party	Candidate	Votes
Co-operative Commonwealth	ARGUE, Hazen Robert	7,772
Liberal	JOHNSON, Charles William	5,641
Progressive Conservative	HAMILTON, Frank Fletcher	2,718

== See also ==
- List of Canadian electoral districts
- Historical federal electoral districts of Canada
