= James Ewen Matthews =

Canadian politician

Member of Parliament for Brandon
- In office November 1938 – November 1950

Personal details
- Born: James Ewen Matthews; 17 August 1869 Albany, Prince Edward Island, Canada
- Died: 24 November 1950 (aged 81)
- Party: Liberal
- Spouse: Deborah Lowther (m. 20 October 1897)
- Profession: insurance agent, journalist, teacher

James Ewen Matthews (17 August 1869 – 24 November 1950) was a Liberal party member of the House of Commons of Canada. He was born in Albany, Prince Edward Island.

Matthews was based in Charlottetown, Prince Edward Island during his early career as a teacher, journalist and Charlottetown city alderman. By 1911, he was based in Brandon, Manitoba where he worked as an insurance agent and became President of the Dominion Life Underwriters Association of Canada.

He was first elected to Parliament at the Brandon riding in a by-election on 14 November 1938, after an unsuccessful campaign in the riding during the 1935 federal election. Matthews was re-elected in 1940, 1945 and 1949. He died on 24 November 1950 before completing his term in the 21st Canadian Parliament.
