= Robert Forke =

Canadian politician (1860–1934)

The Honourable Robert Forke PC
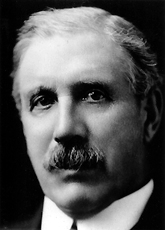

Member of Parliament for Brandon
- In office 1921–1929
- Preceded by: Howard P. Whidden
- Succeeded by: David Wilson Beaubier

Canadian Senator from Manitoba
- In office 1929–1934
- Appointed by: William Lyon Mackenzie King

Personal details
- Born: April 6, 1860 Gordon, Berwickshire, Scotland
- Died: February 2, 1934 (aged 73) Winnipeg, Manitoba, Canada
- Party: Progressive (1921-1926); Liberal-Progressive (1926-1934)

Robert Forke PC (April 6, 1860 – February 2, 1934) was a Canadian politician. He was elected as Member of Parliament for Brandon in 1921. In 1922, he replaced Thomas Crerar as leader of the Progressive Party of Canada. Forke served as a cabinet minister in the government of William Lyon Mackenzie King.

== Life and career ==
Forke was born in Gordon in Berwickshire, Scotland, and was educated at public school in Westruther. He moved to Canada in 1882, and worked as a farmer. Forke was the reeve of Pipestone in Manitoba for twenty years before entering federal politics, and served as Secretary-Treasurer of the Union of Manitoba Municipalities for eleven years.

He was initially a supporter of the Liberal Party of Canada, and campaigned for the Legislative Assembly of Manitoba as a candidate of the provincial Liberal Party in a by-election held on January 9, 1909. He lost to Harvey Simpson of the Conservative Party by 206 votes. Forke later became involved in the agrarian political movement, and joined the Progressive Party.

He was first elected to the House of Commons of Canada in the 1921 election, defeating his Conservative and Liberal opponents in Brandon by a significant majority. The Progressives won 63 seats in a 235-member parliament, and held the potential balance of power in an evenly divided house. Soon after the election, Forke was part of delegation to Ottawa led by party leader Thomas Crerar, seeking policy concessions from the governing Liberals in return for parliamentary support. He was named parliamentary Whip for the Manitoba Progressives in early 1922.

In his classic study of the Progressive Party in Canada, historian W.L. Morton described Forke as "a bluff amiable Scots Canadian of transparent honest and transcendent modesty", and "a western agrarian Liberal who hoped to redeem the federal Liberal party but who thought continued Progressive independence a necessary means to that end". This moderate position was shared by Crerar, but opposed by the more radical wing of the party based in Alberta.

After Crerar proved unable to hold the Progressive Party together, Forke was elected the party's executive chairman and house leader on November 11, 1922. Some reports indicate that he defeated Joseph Shaw in a vote of assembled delegates, though Shaw claimed he withdrew before a vote took place. The change in leadership brought little change in policy direction, and Crerar remained an important organizer for the party.

In 1923, Forke moved an amendment to W.S. Fielding's budget, called for dramatic reductions in tariff rates. This was defeated, although two backbench Liberals voted with the Progressives. One year later, Forke refused to support a similar motion from J.S. Woodsworth which could have brought the government down.

Forke served as Progressive Party leader at a time when the party, which never had a strong central organization to begin with, was fragmenting into a series of smaller factions. Several Members of Parliament left the Progressive caucus between 1922 and 1925, including the radical "Ginger Group" on the left and tacit Liberal Party supporters on the right. Forke attempted to maintain party unity, although the party's internal contradictions may have ultimately made this task impossible.

For the 1925 federal election, Forke issued a party manifesto which described both of the "old parties" as ineffective, and opposed formal alignment with the Liberals. Forke himself only campaigned in Manitoba and Saskatchewan, and the Progressive effort as a whole was weaker than in 1921. The party fell to 24 seats, all of which located west of Ontario. Forke was personally re-elected in Brandon, though by a greatly reduced margin.

The Conservative Party emerged as the largest parliamentary group in the election but did not win a majority of seats, leaving the Progressives in a kingmaker position. After a series of negotiations, and with Forke's personal encouragement, the Progressive caucus agreed to support the Liberals under Mackenzie King. Forke favoured cabinet representation for his party, but this was rejected by the Alberta wing. Forke was retained as Progressive house leader at a meeting in early 1926, although Alberta representative Henry Elvins Spencer was chosen as the new party secretary.

Morton speculates that Forke and the Manitoba Progressive MPs were reconciled to a Liberal-Progressive fusion by this time, and argues that it was only the Customs Scandal which prevented this from happening in the 1925-26 parliament. Forke resigned as Progressive house leader on June 30, 1926, one day after Mackenzie King resigned as Prime Minister.

Conservative leader Arthur Meighen was nominated by the Governor General to replace King as Prime Minister, but Meighen's government soon fell on a confidence measure when the Progressive refused to support him. The Progressive Party did not fight the 1926 election as a united force, and instead fragmented into a series of provincial organizations which followed different strategies. The Manitoba Progressives forged an electoral alliance with the Liberals, elected seven members on a "Liberal-Progressive" ticket, and made arrangements in other ridings to avoid vote-splitting against the Conservatives.

Forke was one of the seven Liberal-Progressives returned for Manitoba. This bloc of MPs insisted on remaining a separate parliamentary group, but caucused with the Liberals and were seated as a group on the Liberal benches. The alliance of the two parties was confirmed on September 25, 1926, when Forke was appointed Minister of Immigration and Colonization with the consent of the Liberal-Progressive caucus. He held this position for over three years, and was appointed by Mackenzie King to the Senate of Canada on December 30, 1929.

Forke served as a "Liberal-Progressive" Senator until his death in 1934.

== Notes ==
1. W.L. Morton, The Progressive Party in Canada, (Toronto: University of Toronto Press, 1950, rev. 1967), p. 135.
2. Morton, p. 152.
3. Morton, pp. 164–165.
4. Morton, p. 184, 190–191.
5. Morton, pp. 194–98, 207.
6. Morton, pp. 240, 243.
7. Morton, pp. 247–249.
8. Morton, pp. 256–257.
9. Morton, p. 271
