= Thomas Crerar =

Canadian politician (1876–1975)

The Honourable Thomas Crerar PC CC
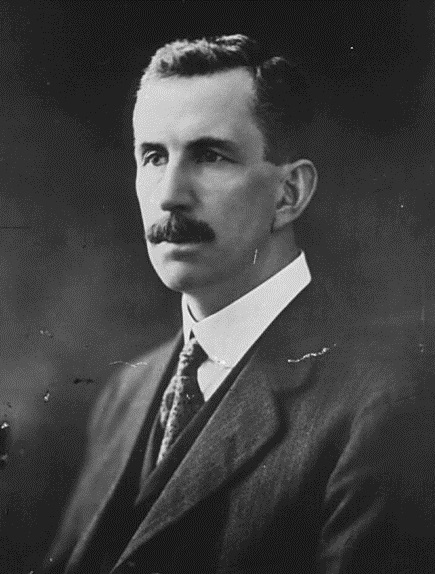
- Crerar in 1919

Minister of Mines and Resources
- In office 1 December 1936 – 17 April 1945
- Prime Minister: W. L. Mackenzie King
- Preceded by: Office Established
- Succeeded by: James Allison Glen

Minister of the Interior Minister of Mines Minister of Immigration and Colonization Superintendent-General of Indian Affairs
- In office 23 October 1935 – 30 November 1936
- Prime Minister: W. L. Mackenzie King
- Preceded by: Thomas Gerow Murphy (as Minister of the Interior and Superintendent-General of Indian Affairs); Wesley Ashton Gordon (as Minister of Mines and Minister of Immigration and Colonization)
- Succeeded by: Office Abolished

Minister of Agriculture
- Acting; 25 October 1935 – 3 November 1935
- Prime Minister: W. L. Mackenzie King
- Preceded by: Robert Weir
- Succeeded by: James Garfield Gardiner
- In office 12 October 1917 – 11 June 1919
- Prime Minister: Sir Robert Borden
- Preceded by: Martin Burrell
- Succeeded by: James Alexander Calder (acting)

Minister of Railways and Canals
- In office 30 December 1929 – 6 August 1930
- Prime Minister: W. L. Mackenzie King
- Preceded by: Charles Avery Dunning (acting)
- Succeeded by: Robert James Manion

Canadian Senator from Manitoba
- In office 18 April 1945 – 31 May 1966
- Appointed by: W. L. Mackenzie King

Member of Parliament for Churchill
- In office 14 October 1935 – 17 April 1945
- Preceded by: Bernard Stitt
- Succeeded by: Ronald Moore

Member of Parliament for Brandon
- In office 5 February 1930 – 27 July 1930
- Preceded by: Robert Forke
- Succeeded by: David Wilson Beaubier

Member of Parliament for Marquette
- In office 17 December 1917 – 28 October 1925
- Preceded by: William James Roche
- Succeeded by: Henry Mullins

Personal details
- Born: Thomas Alexander Crerar; 17 June 1876 Molesworth, Ontario, Canada
- Died: 11 April 1975 (aged 98) Victoria, British Columbia, Canada
- Party: Unionist (1917–1922); Progressive (1921–1925); Liberal (1930–1966)
- Spouse: Jessie Hamilton (m. 1906; died 1967)
- Children: 2
- Education: University of Manitoba (LLD)
- Profession: Farmer; grain merchant; managing director; teacher

Thomas Alexander Crerar PC CC (June 17, 1876 – April 11, 1975) was a Canadian politician.

== Early career ==
Crerar rose to prominence as leader of the Manitoba Grain Growers' Association in the 1910s. Although he had no experience as an elected official, he was appointed as Minister of Agriculture in Robert Laird Borden's Union government on October 12, 1917, to provide a show of national unity during the First World War. He was easily elected to the House of Commons of Canada for Marquette in the election of 1917.

On June 11, 1919, Crerar resigned from his position in protest against the high tariff policies of the Conservative-dominated government. He was strongly in favor of free trade with the United States, which would have benefited the western farmers.

== Progressive Party of Canada ==
In 1920, he was selected as leader of the Progressive Party. In the 1921 election, he led the party to a landslide victory in western Canada, giving them 65 seats in the House of Commons. Crerar failed to hold the party together, however. He resigned as leader in 1922, and the party collapsed shortly thereafter. In 1925, he left politics for a few years.

== Private sector work ==
Crerar spent some time in the private sector before returning to politics in 1929, as a member of William Lyon Mackenzie King's Liberal Party. Although once again not holding a seat in parliament, he was appointed Minister of Railways and Canals (Canada) on December 30, 1929, and won a by-election in Brandon on February 5, 1930. King's government was defeated in the general election that followed, however, and Crerar was personally defeated in his riding.

== Return to politics ==
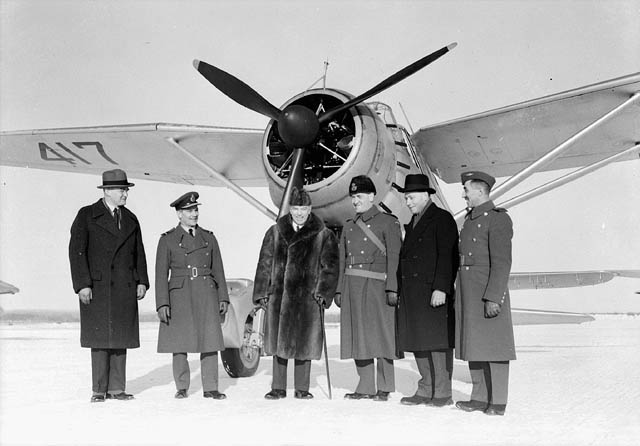
Rt. Hon. W.L. Mackenzie King inspecting No. 110 (City of Toronto) Squadron, R.C.A.F. The aircraft in the background is Westland 'Lysander' II 417. [L-R]: Hon. T.A. Crerar, Air Marshal G.M. Croil, Rt. Hon. W.L. Mackenzie King, W/C W.D. Van Vliet, Hon. Norman Rogers, 13 January 1940.

He returned to parliament in the 1935 election, as the member for the northern Manitoba riding of Churchill. He was once again appointed to King's cabinet, serving as Minister of Immigration and Colonization, Minister of Mines, Minister of the Interior and Superintendent-General of Indian Affairs from October 23, 1935, to November 30, 1936. On December 1, 1936, he was removed from most of his responsibilities and became simply Minister of Mines and Resources, holding the position until April 17, 1945.

Crerar was appointed to the Senate of Canada on April 18, 1945, and remained a Senator until his retirement on May 31, 1966. In 1962, Crerar considered it an "error" to give voting rights to Inuit and advocated revoking this right for Inuit in the eastern Arctic to vote. In 1973, he was made a Companion of the Order of Canada. He died in 1975 and is buried at Elmwood Cemetery.

== Electoral history ==
1940 Canadian federal election: Churchill
Party	Candidate	Votes	%	±%
Liberal	Thomas Crerar	8,276	62.5	+22.5
National Government	Will Blakeman Scarth	4,963	37.5	+3.2
Total valid votes		13,239	100.0	

Note: "National Government" vote is compared to Conservative vote in 1935 election.

1935 Canadian federal election: Churchill
Party	Candidate	Votes	%
Liberal	Thomas Crerar	3,603	40.0
Conservative	Barney M. Stitt	3,091	34.3
Co-operative Commonwealth	Alexander Stewart	2,313	25.7
Total valid votes		9,007	100.0
