= Liberal-Progressive =

Canadian political label

Liberal-Progressive was a label used by a number of candidates in Canadian elections between 1925 and 1953. In federal and Ontario politics there was no Liberal-Progressive Party, as such. The term generally referred to candidates endorsed by Liberal and Progressive constituency associations or to individual candidates who claimed the label, sometimes running against a straight Liberal or straight Progressive candidate. In Manitoba, a party existed with this name provincially, and Liberal-Progressives ran federally in Manitoba under the leadership of Robert Forke, with the support of the Liberal Party.

== Federal politics ==
With the Progressive Party's 1921 electoral breakthrough, Canadian federal politics operated under a "three party system" for the first time. The Liberal Party under William Lyon Mackenzie King tried to deal with this situation by co-opting the Progressives, offering to form a coalition with them. The Progressive Party refused. But by 1926, the party had split and some Progressives decided to support the Liberals, running as Liberal-Progressive or Liberal-Labour-Progressives, or similar variations. This phenomenon occurred particularly in the 1925 election and the 1926 election. A number of Liberal-Progressive Members of Parliament (MPs) became full-fledged Liberals in the 1930s. There was one Independent Liberal-Progressive candidate in 1925.

In the 1925 election, only one candidate ran—unsuccessfully—under the Liberal Progressive banner. There was also one Independent Liberal-Progressive candidate that year.

In the 1926 election, twelve candidates ran as Liberal-Progressives and eight were elected, including seven in Manitoba and one in Saskatchewan. There were three unsuccessful candidates in Ontario. Manitoba Liberal-Progressive, Robert Forke, who was the group's leader, was appointed to the Cabinet. These candidates were not opposed by the Liberal Party in the election and ran with the understanding that they would sit with and support the Liberals in Parliament and attend Liberal caucus meetings. Mackenzie King's Liberals alone did not have a majority of seats in the House of Commons after the 1926 election, but were able to form a minority government with the support of the Liberal-Progressives in the house. This government lasted for four years. The Liberal-Progressives also had their own caucus meetings and developed their own politics on certain issues, particularly in relation to agriculture. For example, they were critical of the 1927 federal budget for not reducing tariffs, a long-time Progressive demand.

In the 1930 election, eight Liberal-Progressives ran in Manitoba, but only two were elected. One candidate was defeated by a Liberal candidate.

In the 1935 election, five Liberal-Progressives ran in Manitoba, four of whom were elected. One of these won over a Liberal candidate, while the defeated Liberal-Progressive was defeated by a Liberal. In Ontario, Hughes Cleaver won Halton on the Liberal-Progressive ticket, but afterwards allied himself with the Liberals.

In the 1940 election, two Liberal-Progressives ran in Manitoba, of whom one was elected. Two Liberal-Progressives ran in Ontario. Both were elected.

"National Liberal Progressive" was a political label used in the federal election of 1940, by W. Garfield Case, in Grey North electoral district in Ontario. Case listed 'Insurance manager' as his profession. He won 2,434 votes, 15.5% of the popular vote. The election was won by the Liberal Party candidate, William P. Telford. When Telford resigned on 9 December 1944, to provide a vacancy for A.G.L. McNaughton, Case ran and won the 5 February 1945 by-election as the candidate of the Progressive Conservative Party of Canada.

William Gilbert Weir was the longest-lasting Liberal-Progressive MP, winning his first election in the riding of Macdonald in Manitoba in 1930. He was re-elected as a Liberal-Progressive in 1935 and 1940. In 1945, 1949 and 1953, he was elected as a Liberal-Progressive for the riding of Portage-Neepawa, and was the sole candidate to run as under the Liberal-Progressive label in those elections. Weir served as Chief Government Whip from 1945 to 1953 and parliamentary assistant to Prime Minister Louis St. Laurent from 1953 to 1957. He was defeated in the 1957 election, the first in which he ran as a Liberal.

Five MPs in all sat as Liberal-Progressives: Edgar Douglas Richmond Bissett, Robert Forke, James Allison Glen, George William McDonald and William Gilbert Weir. Forke and Glen became ministers in Liberal cabinets (Glen also served as Speaker of the House of Commons of Canada) while Weir served as government whip for a number of years.

Forke was appointed to the Senate of Canada in 1929 and was the sole Liberal-Progressive to ever sit in that body.

== Alberta ==
In Alberta, one candidate ran under the Liberal-Progressive banner during the 1926 Alberta election. Mr A.D. Campbell won 252 votes, in the Camrose district, and came in fourth place.

== Ontario ==
In Ontario, an electoral coalition was formed in 1934 between the provincial Liberals under Mitchell Hepburn, and the Progressive bloc of Members of the Legislative Assembly (MLAs) under Harry Nixon. Nixon had been elected with the United Farmers of Ontario (UFO) and served in cabinet of E. C. Drury as Provincial Secretary and Registrar of Ontario when the party formed government in 1919. By the end of its term in 1923, the party had changed its name to the Progressives and after the 1926 election, Nixon was the sole former member of the Drury cabinet left in the Legislature.

In the coalition formed in 1934, the Progressive group ran as Liberal-Progressives. They were eventually absorbed into the Ontario Liberal Party. Even before 1934, several candidates ran and were elected under the Liberal-Progressive banner:

- Thomas Blakelock of Halton was elected on that ticket in 1929, 1934 and 1937.
- Frederick Sandy of Victoria South was elected as a UFO MLA in 1919, defeated in 1923 and returned to serve as a Liberal-Progressive from 1926-1929;
- Merton Elvin Scott of Oxford South served as a Liberal-Progressive MLA from 1926 to 1929; and
- UFO MLA David Munroe Ross of Oxford North was re-elected as a Liberal-Progressive in 1926 and 1929.

It was only in the 1934 election that a formal alliance between the Progressives and Liberals began, returning four Liberal-Progressive MLAs (Nixon, Douglas Campbell of Kent East, Roland Patterson of Grey North and James Francis Kelly of Muskoka).

Liberal-Progressive leader Harry Nixon was provincial secretary in Liberal Premier Mitchell Hepburn's cabinet from its inception in 1934. He and Kelly ran for re-election as Liberals in the 1937 provincial election and were returned to office. Nixon served as Leader of the Liberal Party from 1943 to 1944 and briefly as Premier on Ontario in 1943, until his government's defeat in the 1943 election, and would continue sitting as a Liberal until his death in 1961. Kelly would sit as a Liberal until leaving politics in 1945. Two remaining Liberal-Progressive MLAs were returned in that election, Campbell and Patterson. Campbell was not returned in the 1943 election while Patterson was re-elected as a straight Liberal.

While he never sat as a Liberal-Progressive, Farquhar Oliver was first elected as a UFO MLA in 1926 and sat informally with the Liberal caucus beginning in 1934, when Hepburn formed government, while remaining a UFO MLA until 1941 when he officially joined the Liberals and was appointed to cabinet as minister of public works. Oliver would serve as leader of the Ontario Liberal Party from 1945 to 1950 and again from 1954 to 1958 and would continue to sit in the legislature as a Liberal until 1967 when he retired from office.

== Manitoba ==
In Manitoba, the Progressives and Liberals merged in 1932 under Premier John Bracken and ran as Liberal-Progressives. Bracken continued as Premier until 1943, when he was replaced by Stuart Garson. In 1948, Garson was replaced by Douglas Campbell.

Although the party was dominated by its "Progressive" wing, it had become popularly known as the Liberal Party by the 1940s. (The national Progressive Party had vanished by this time.) It changed its name to the Manitoba Liberal Party in 1961, against only scattered objections from diehard Progressives.

== See also ==
- List of political parties in Canada
