= 1925 Canadian federal election =

- October 29, 1925

245 seats in the House of Commons 123 seats needed for a majority
- Turnout: 66.4% (▼1.3 pp)
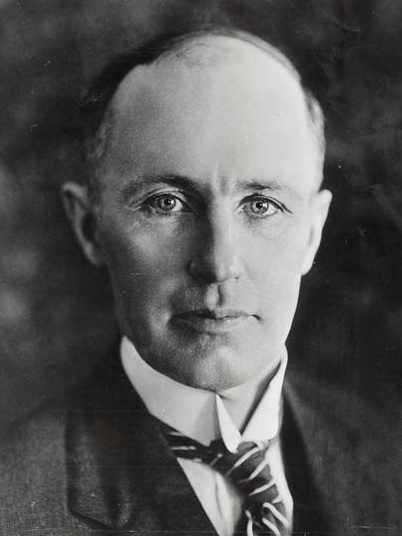

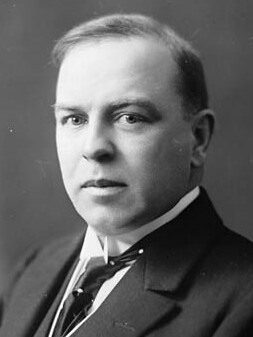

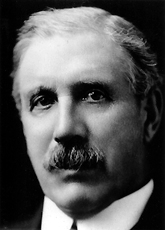

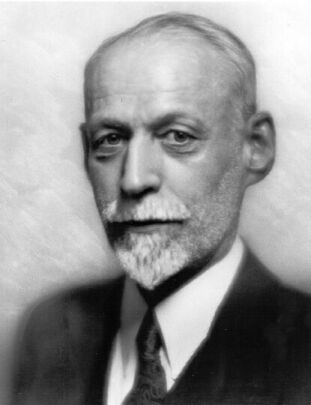

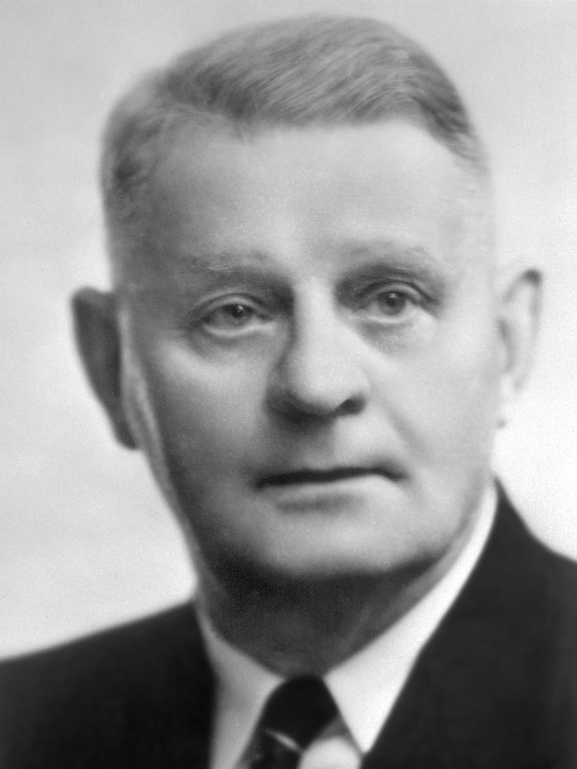
	First party	Second party	Third party
Leader	Arthur Meighen	W. L. Mackenzie King	Robert Forke
Party	Conservative	Liberal	Progressive
Leader since	July 10, 1920	August 7, 1919	November 11, 1922
Leader's seat	Grenville candidate in Portage la Prairie	York North (lost re-election)	Brandon
Last election	49 seats, 29.95%	118 seats, 41.15%	58 seats, 21.09%
Seats won	115	100 (Note: The Liberals did not win the most seats, but formed government with the support of Farmer/Progressive MPs.)	22
Seat change	▲66	▼18	▼36
Popular vote	1,454,253	1,252,684	266,319
Percentage	46.13%	39.74%	8.45%
Swing	▲16.18 pp	▼1.41 pp	▼12.65 pp
	Fourth party	Fifth party
Leader	J. S. Woodsworth	Herbert Greenfield
Party	Independent Labour	United Farmers of Alberta
Leader since	December 6, 1921	August 13, 1921
Leader's seat	Winnipeg North Centre	Did not run (Note: The United Farmers of Alberta, which at the time formed the government in that province, did not have a separate party leader at the federal level. At the time of this election, party leader Herbert Greenfield was the Premier of Alberta and the MLA for Peace River in the Legislative Assembly of Alberta.)
Last election	3 seats, 2.73%	2 seats, 0.71%
Seats won	2	2
Seat change	▼1	Steady
Popular vote	56,987	8,053
Percentage	1.81%	0.26%
Swing	▼0.93 pp	▼0.46 pp

- The Canadian parliament after the 1925 election
Prime Minister before election
William Lyon Mackenzie King
Liberal
Prime Minister after election
William Lyon Mackenzie King
Liberal

The 1925 Canadian federal election was held on October 29, 1925, to elect members of the House of Commons of Canada of the 15th Parliament of Canada. The Conservative party took the most seats in the House of Commons, although not a majority. Prime Minister William Lyon Mackenzie King's Liberal Party was invited to form a minority government. Unlike the Conservative party, King's Liberals had the conditional support of the many Farmer/Progressive MPs. As a result, this is the only election in which the party that won the most seats did not get to form a government afterward.

The government fell the following year. Governor General Baron Byng of Vimy offered the Conservatives under Meighen a chance to form government. This too fell in short order. Byng's action in refusing King's request became the main issue of the 1926 election under the name "King–Byng Affair".

== Background ==
The previous federal election in 1921 had seen Mackenzie King's Liberals fall narrowly short of winning a parliamentary majority, with Arthur Meighen's Conservatives falling to being the third-largest party, and the new Progressive Party, which had nominated candidates for the first time that year, held the balance of power. King was able to rule with the tacit support of the Progressives, and was not facing a statutory federal election until December 1926; however, a budget proposed in September 1925 by finance minister William Stevens Fielding was unexpectedly voted down in parliament, obligating Mackenzie King to resign as Prime Minister and recommend to the Governor General, Baron Byng of Vimy to hold a new election (theoretically King could have recommended that Byng allow either Meighen or Progressive leader Robert Forke to form a government, but the Conservatives were far short of the number of MPs required to form a stable government, and Forke had no interest in being Prime Minister).

== Aftermath and the King–Byng Affair ==
The Liberals won fewer seats than the Conservatives, who were left eight seats short of a majority. The Progressives lost almost two thirds of their seats from the previous election, but they still held enough seats to control the balance of power. King decided to hold on to power with the help of the Progressives. The Progressives were closely aligned with the Liberals and enabled King to form a minority government.

That plan was complicated by the fact that his party won fewer seats than the Conservatives and that King himself had lost his seat in the House of Commons. Meighen was outraged by King's move and demanded for King to resign from the Prime Minister's office. Byng privately agreed that the Conservatives should be allowed to form the next government and felt that the Liberal-Progressive pact was a corrupt bargain, but he found that there were no valid legal grounds for refusing to allow King to continue in office. King asked a Liberal Member of Parliament from Prince Albert, Saskatchewan, to resign so that he could run in the resulting by-election. Prince Albert was one of the safest seats in Canada for the Liberals, and King won easily.

With King back in Parliament, a huge scandal rocked the King cabinet when one of his appointees was discovered to be accepting bribes from a male lover. Anticipating a vote of censure by the Commons, King asked Byng to call an election. The Governor General refused, and King resigned on June 28, 1926. Meighen was then invited to form a government.

King claimed that was interference in Canadian politics by an official appointed by a foreign power. King showed rare fire and rallied the Progressives back into his camp. He defeated Meighen on a vote of confidence after only three days, which made the Meighen government of 1926 the shortest-lasting government in Canadian history. This time, Byng called an election.

== National results ==

Party	Party leader	# of candidates	Seats			Popular vote		
Party	Party leader	# of candidates	1921	Elected	% Change	#	%	pp Change
Conservative	Arthur Meighen	232	49	115	+132.7%	1,454,253	46.13%	+16.18
Liberal	W. L. Mackenzie King	217	118	100	-15.3%	1,259,279	39.94%	-1.21
Progressive	Robert Forke	68	58	22	-62.1%	266,319	8.45%	-12.65
Labour	J.S. Woodsworth	20	3	2	-33.3%	56,987	1.81%	-0.93
Independent		8	2	2	-	16,212	0.51%	-2.52
United Farmers of Alberta		2	2	2	-	8,053	0.26%	-0.46
Independent Liberal		10	-	1		31,140	0.99%	+0.90
Independent Conservative		6	1	1	-	16,759	0.53%	+0.14
Unknown		4	-	-	-	13, 998	0.65%	+0.16
Liberal-Protectionist		2	*	-	*	6,915	0.22%	*
Independent Liberal-Progressive		1	*	-	*	4,958	0.16%	*
Labour-Farmer		2	*	-	*	4,774	0.15%	*
Liberal–Progressive		1	*	-	*	3,319	0.11%	*
Independent Labour		1	*	-	*	2,901	0.09%	*
Socialist		1	-	-	-	1,888	0.06%	-0.04
Independent Progressive		1	1	-	-100%	1,768	0.06%	-0.05
Farmer		1	*	-	*	1,130	0.04%	*
Progressive-Conservative		1	*	-	*	1,120	0.04%	*
Farmer–Labour		1	*	-	*	762	0.02%	*
Total		579	235	245	+3.8%	3,152,525	100%	
Sources: http://www.elections.ca -- History of Federal Ridings since 1867

Notes:

* not applicable - the party was not recognized in the previous election

== Vote and seat summaries ==
Ternary plots - shift of electoral support (1921-1925)
1921

1925
Electoral districts identified by colours of winning parties

Popular vote
Conservative	46.13%
Liberal	39.74%
Progressive	8.45%
Others	5.68%

Seat totals
Conservative	46.94%
Liberal	40.82%
Progressive	8.98%
Others	3.27%

== Results by province ==
Party name		BC	AB	SK	MB	ON	QC	NB	NS	PE	YK	Total
Conservative	Seats:	10	3	-	7	67	4	10	11	2	1	115
Conservative	Popular Vote (%):	49.3	31.8	25.4	41.3	56.3	34.2	59.7	56.4	33.1	59.4	46.1
Liberal	Seats:	3	4	15	1	12	59	1	3	2	-	100
Liberal	Vote (%):	34.7	27.6	41.9	20.3	30.9	59.6	37.0	41.9	52.0	40.6	39.7
Progressive	Seats:	-	7	6	7	2						22
Progressive	Vote (%):	6.1	26.5	31.8	25.1	8.8						8.5
Labour	Seats:	-	-		2	-	-		-			2
Labour	Vote:	6.3	6.1		9.6	1.2	0.2		1.6			1.8
Independent	Seats:	1				-	1	-				2
Independent	Vote (%):	2.6				0.6	1.4	0.8				0.5
United Farmers of Alberta	Seats:		2									2
United Farmers of Alberta	Vote (%):		5.0									0.3
Independent Liberal	Seats:						1					1
Independent Liberal	Vote (%):						3.8					1.0
Independent Conservative	Seats:					1						1
Independent Conservative	Vote (%):					1.4						0.5
Total seats		14	16	21	17	82	65	11	14	4	1	245
Parties that won no seats:
Unknown	Vote (%):			0.1		0.9	0.2			15.0		0.7
Liberal-Protectionist	Vote (%):						0.9					0.2
Independent Liberal-Progressive	Vote (%):							3.3				0.2
Labour-Farmer	Vote (%):		3.0									0.2
Liberal–Progressive	Vote (%):				1.9							0.1
Independent Labour	Vote (%):				1.7							0.1
Socialist	Vote (%):	1.0										0.1
Independent Progressive	Vote (%):			0.9								0.1
Farmer	Vote (%):						0.1					xx
Progressive-Conservative	Vote (%):						0.1					xx
Farmer–Labour	Vote (%):					0.1						xx

== See also ==
- List of Canadian federal general elections
- List of political parties in Canada
- 15th Canadian Parliament
