= 1926 Canadian federal election =

- September 14, 1926

245 seats in the House of Commons 123 seats needed for a majority
- Turnout: 67.7% (▲1.3 pp)
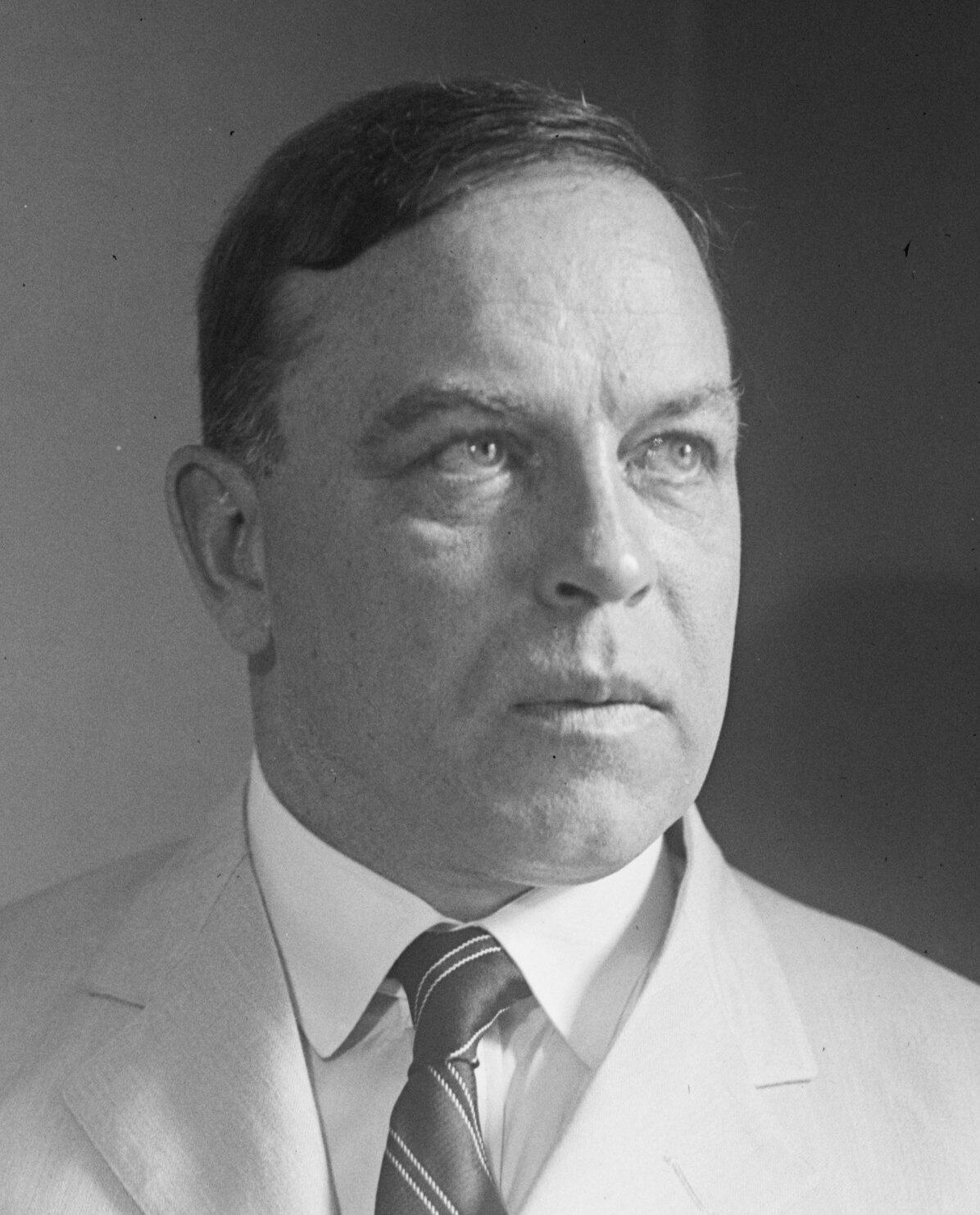

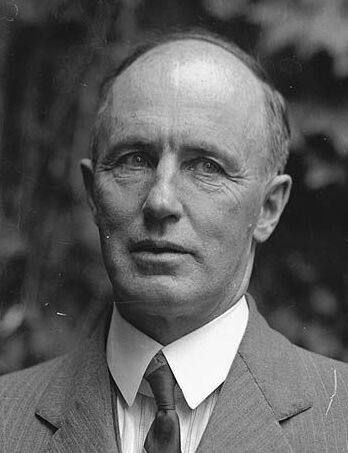

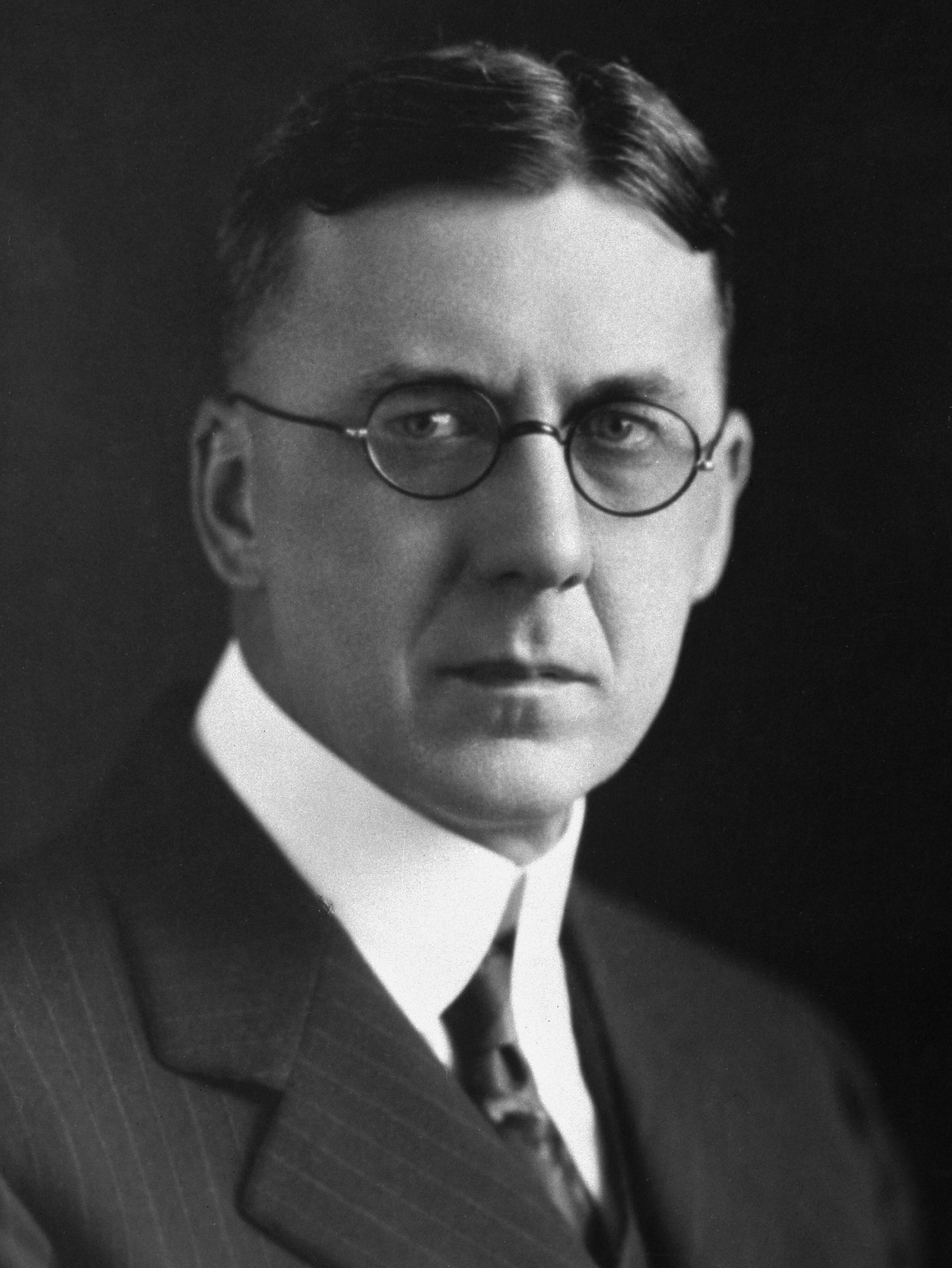
	First party	Second party
Leader	W. L. Mackenzie King	Arthur Meighen
Party	Liberal (Note: The Liberals formed a minority government with the help of Liberal-Progressive MPs.)	Conservative
Leader since	August 7, 1919	July 10, 1920
Leader's seat	Prince Albert	Portage la Prairie (lost re-election)
Last election	100 seats, 39.74%	115 seats, 46.13%
Seats won	116	91
Seat change	▲16	▼24
Popular vote	1,397,031	1,476,834
Percentage	42.90%	45.35%
Swing	▲3.06 pp	▼0.78 pp
	Third party	Fourth party
Leader	none	John E. Brownlee
Party	Progressive	United Farmers of Alberta
Leader since	N/A	November 23, 1925
Leader's seat	N/A	Did not stand
Last election	22 seats, 8.45%	2 seats, 0.26%
Seats won	11	11
Seat change	▼11	▲9
Popular vote	128,060	60,740
Percentage	3.93%	1.87%
Swing	▼4.52 pp	▲1.61 pp

- The Canadian parliament after the 1926 election
Prime Minister before election
Arthur Meighen
Conservative
Prime Minister after election
William Lyon Mackenzie King
Liberal

The 1926 Canadian federal election was held on September 14, 1926, to elect members of the House of Commons of Canada of the 16th Parliament of Canada. The election was called after an event known as the King–Byng affair.

In the 1925 federal election, Prime Minister William Lyon Mackenzie King's Liberal Party of Canada had won fewer seats in the House of Commons of Canada than the Conservatives of Arthur Meighen. King, however, was determined to continue to govern with the support of the Progressive Party. The combined Liberal and Progressive caucuses gave Mackenzie King a plurality of seats in the House of Commons, and the ability to form a minority government.

The agreement collapsed, however, after a scandal, and King approached the governor general of Canada, Baron Byng of Vimy, to seek dissolution of the Parliament. Byng refused on the basis that the Conservatives had won the most seats in the prior election and so he called upon Meighen to form a government.

Prime Minister Meighen's government was soon defeated in a vote of non-confidence, and Byng agreed to Meighen's request to dissolve Parliament and call new elections. King effectively campaigned against Byng, instead of against Meighen, in the election. King's Liberals won the most seats in the House of Commons although they received fewer votes than the Conservatives. However, this may have been largely because the Liberals did not run candidates in all ridings - they had an informal electoral pact with the Progressives and Liberal-Progressives. Robert Forke had resigned as Progressive house leader on June 30, 1926. The Progressives fractured and Forke ran for re-election as a Liberal-Progressive. Of 12 Liberal-Progressive candidates, 8 were elected.

The Conservatives suffered from disproportional transition from votes to seats. In particular, in Manitoba Meighen's party captured almost 40 per cent of the vote, twice the vote share of any other party, but no seats.

King's Liberals did not take a majority of seats but were able to govern with the support of Liberal-Progressive Members of Parliament.

The Progressive Party's Albertan legislators left the party and instead sought re-election under the United Farmers of Alberta banner. At the time, the UFA formed the government in Alberta. They won eleven seats in Alberta, an increase of nine from the previous year and the same number the Progressives won elsewhere. The Progressives' seat count was halved compared to 1925, although when viewed in its totality the election result can also be regarded as a combined net decrease of two seats for the Progressives and UFA.

Byng returned to Britain at the end of the year and was raised to the rank of viscount as an expression of confidence in him. After his party's defeat and the loss of his seat, Meighen resigned as Conservative leader.

== National results ==

Party	Party leader	# of candidates	Seats			Popular vote		
Party	Party leader	# of candidates	1925	Elected	% Change	#	%	pp Change
Liberal	W. L. Mackenzie King	203	100	116	+16.0%	1,397,031	42.90%	+3.06
Conservative	Arthur Meighen	232	115	91	-20.2%	1,476,834	45.35%	-0.78
Progressive		28	22	11	-50.0%	128,060	3.93%	-4.52
United Farmers of Alberta		12	2	11	+450%	60,740	1.87%	+1.61
Liberal–Progressive	Robert Forke	12	-	8		63,144	1.94%	+1.83
Labour		18	2	4	+100%	55,661	1.71%	-0.10
Independent		10	2	2	-	25,821	0.79%	+0.28
Independent Liberal		5	1	1	-	18,627	0.57%	-0.42
United Farmers of Ontario		1	*	1	*	6,909	0.21%	*
Independent Conservative		3	1	-	-100%	10,164	0.31%	-0.23
Progressive-Conservative		2	-	-	-	7,088	0.22%	+0.18
Liberal-Labour		1	*	-	*	4,187	0.13%	*
Labour-Farmer		1	-	-	-	1,441	0.04%	-0.11
Socialist		1	-	-	-	672	0.02%	-0.04
Protectionist		1	*	-	*	129	x	*
Total		530	245	245	-	3,256,508	100%	
Sources: http://www.elections.ca -- History of Federal Ridings since 1867

Notes:

* not applicable - the party was not recognized in the previous election

x - less than 0.005% of the popular vote

== Vote and seat summaries ==
Ternary plots - shift of electoral support (1925-1926)
1925

1926
Electoral districts identified by colours of winning parties

Popular vote
Conservative	45.35%
Liberal	42.90%
Progressive	3.93%
United Farmers	1.87%
Others	5.95%

Seat totals
Liberal	47.35%
Conservative	37.14%
Progressive	4.49%
United Farmers	4.49%
Others	6.53%

== Results by province ==
Party name		BC	AB	SK	MB	ON	QC	NB	NS	PE	YK	Total
Liberal	Seats:	1	3	16	4	24	59	4	2	3	-	116
Liberal	Popular Vote (%):	37.0	24.5	51.3	18.4	35.3	61.3	46.1	43.5	52.7	44.1	42.8
Conservative	Seats:	12	1	-	-	53	4	7	12	1	1	91
Conservative	Vote:	54.2	31.5	27.5	39.7	54.9	34.0	53.9	53.7	47.3	55.9	45.4
Progressive	Seats:			4	4	3						11
Progressive	Vote:			17.9	11.2	5.1						3.9
United Farmers of Alberta	Seats:		11									11
United Farmers of Alberta	Vote:		38.7									1.9
Liberal-Progressive	Seats:			1	7	-						8
Liberal-Progressive	Vote:			3.2	19.5	1.4						1.9
Labour	Seats:	-	1		2	1			-			4
Labour	Vote:	6.4	4.3		8.7	1.1			2.8			1.7
Independent	Seats:	1	-			-	1					2
Independent	Vote:	2.3	0.1			0.5	1.9					0.8
Independent Liberal	Seats:						1					1
Independent Liberal	Vote:						2.3					0.6
United Farmers of Ontario	Seats:					1						1
United Farmers of Ontario	Vote:					0.6						0.2
Total seats		14	16	21	17	82	65	11	14	4	1	245
Parties that won no seats:
Independent Conservative	Vote:					0.8	0.1					0.3
Progressive-Conservative	Vote:				2.5		0.3					0.2
Liberal-Labour	Vote:					0.3						0.1
Labour-Farmer	Vote:		0.9									xx
Socialist	Vote:						0.1					xx
Protectionist	Vote:						xx					xx

xx - less than 0.05% of the popular vote

== See also ==
- List of Canadian federal general elections
- List of political parties in Canada
- 16th Canadian Parliament
