= St. Patrick's Society of Montreal =

- Formation: March 17, 1834; 192 years ago
- Type: Charitable organization
- Tax ID no.: 892743667 RR 0001
- Legal status: Charity
- Purpose: Promote Irish traditions and culture.; Represent and advocate for Irish Canadian community when needed.; Encourage charitable, educational, and cultural activities within community.
- Headquarters: Montreal
- President: Carol McCormick
- Revenue: 445,672.00 CAD (2024)
- Expenses: 340,730.00 CAD (2024)
- Website: https://spsmtl.com/

The St. Patrick's Society of Montreal (French: Société Saint-Patrick de Montréal) is the oldest fraternal organization in Canada. In existence since March 17, 1834, it predates the Société Saint-Jean Baptiste by three months. The St. Patrick's Society continues to be a leader in Montreal's Irish community, organizing such annual events as the St. Patrick's Ball, the St. Patrick's Luncheon, and the St. Patrick's Society's annual Christmas concert. The Society's current President is Carol McCormick.

== History ==
=== Origins ===
There is evidence of Irish immigrants in Quebec as far back as the 1760s. The first St. Patrick's Parade was organized by Michael O'Sullivan in 1824. By 1834, a group of notable businessmen gathered to form what is now known as the St. Patrick’s Society of Montreal, founded on March 17, 1834, at McCabe’s Hotel in Old Montreal. The first executive officers of the Society were President John Donnellan, Vice Presidents Hon. Michael O'Sullivan, Benjamin Holmes, and Thomas A. Begley, Treasurer John M. Tobin, Corresponding Secretary S. Sweeney, and Recording Secretary H. McGregor, who were supported by twelve committee members. Many involved were longstanding leaders of the community. In the March 20, 1824 edition of the Canadian Spectator mention is made of M. O'Sullivan Esq being in the chair at a Hibernian Society dinner. O'Sullivan is reported to have expressed how shameful it was that "St. Patrick's Day had never before been met with a public celebration". In the 1831 Montreal Almanack John Donnellan is listed as President of the Montreal Hibernian Benevolent Society.

The Society was not a political organization, but was largely charitable and national in purpose, and was principally social and educational. However, it was founded mainly by Irish Protestants in the spring of 1834 in order to oppose the 92 Resolutions sent by Lower-Canadian Louis-Joseph Papineau's Patriotes to the British Government. In that sense, loyalty to the Crown was central to the founding of St. Patrick's Society. The Society was at first non-sectarian. The first President was John Donnellan, a prominent Montreal citizen.

The founding of the Society was closely followed by the establishment of the St. Jean Baptiste Society in June 1834, the St. Andrew's Society in February 1835, the German Society of Montreal on April 21, 1835, the St. George’s Society on April 27, 1835, and later the St. David’s Society and the Caledonian Society. The beautiful spirit of friendliness and cooperation among the so-called Sister Anglophone Societies since their inception has been notable and has persisted throughout the years. The St. Patrick's Society, the St. Andrew's Society and the St. George's Society were opposed to the Patriotes bas-Canadiens who founded the Société Saint-Jean-Baptiste, named "Aide-toi et le Ciel t'aidera" at its inception in 1834 by former 1st Mayor of Montréal, Jacques Viger. The national qualities and purposes of the various anglophone bodies were commented upon by the Honourable Peter McGill, the first English-speaking Mayor of Montreal, at a dinner given by St. Patrick’s Society on the evening of March 17, 1836.

=== End of non-sectarianism ===
The Society continued as non-sectarian until the year 1856, under the able presidency of such men as John Donnellan, Benjamin Holmes, Sir Francis Hincks, Bernard Devlin, W.F. Batley, Thomas Ryan and many others, at which time the non-Catholic members were encouraged to establish a society of their own. This separation was largely the work of Reverend Patrick Dowd. As a result, the Catholic members retained the old name of the Society, and the non-Catholic members assumed the name “Irish Protestant Benevolent Society”. Among those who vigorously opposed the separation was Sir William Hales Hingston, a prominent surgeon and later, the Mayor of Montreal, who tendered his resignation from the Society as a gesture against what he termed the uncalled for division. The Society returned to its non-denominational origins in the latter part of the twentieth century.

=== Thomas D’Arcy McGee ===
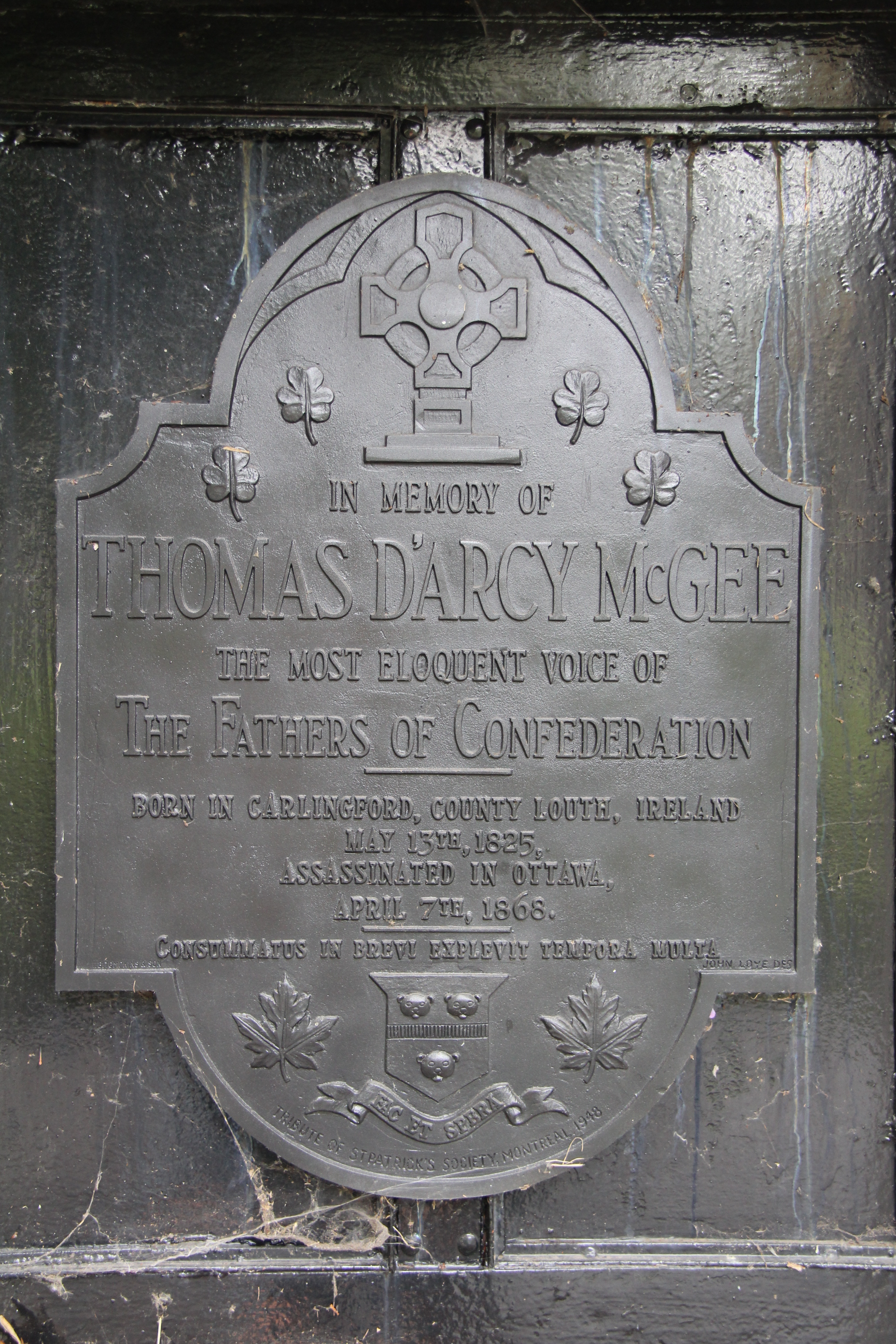
T.D. McGee mausoleum door

One of the most illustrious members of the Society was the Honourable Thomas D’Arcy McGee, the poet, newspaper editor and Member of Parliament for Montreal West, whose great eloquence played a crucial role in the formation of the Dominion of Canada. Despite his fame and position, he was expelled from the Society in 1868 as a result of his strong condemnation of the Fenian movement, because the Society had by then been taken over by a majority of Fenian members or sympathizers. Shortly after his expulsion from the Society, McGee was assassinated in Ottawa on April 7, 1868. Perhaps somewhat hypocritically, the Society forwarded a letter of condolence to his family expressing their abhorrence of the crime and arranged for his burial in Notre Dame des Neiges Cemetery on Mount Royal. His tomb has ever since been looked after by St. Patrick’s Society. At the 178th annual meeting, held June 19, 2012 at the Hyatt Regency Hotel, the members witnessed a highly informative and entertaining debate between David Wilson and J. Peter Shea, the Society's historian, about the merits of reinstating McGee's membership posthumously. After the debate, which lasted forty minutes, the members present voted overwhelmingly in favour of reinstatement after 144 years as a Society outcast.

=== World War I ===
At the outbreak of the Great War in August 1914, realizing that it was vitally important that the Irish community of Montreal play their part in the defence of Canada, members of the Society were largely instrumental in the formation of an Irish Canadian Regiment. Hence, in the fall of 1914, the 55th Regiment, Irish Canadian Rangers, under the command of Lieutenant Colonel Harry Trihey, K.C. and Major William O’Brien, a prominent Montreal stock-broker, came into being. Later, towards the end of January 1916, it was decided to form an Overseas Battalion, and the Canadian Infantry Battalion, Irish Canadian Rangers (later to be known as the 199th Battalion Duchess of Connaught's Own Irish Rangers, CEF), commenced recruiting. Practically all the officers, non-commissioned officers and men of the old 55th Regiment offered their services for overseas, and thanks to St. Patrick’s Society, the Battalion’s colours were formally presented on the Champ de Mars in June 1916.

=== Recent times ===
The Society played a leadership role with respect to scholarships, child welfare, Irish Home Rule and other kindred matters. It would be impossible to describe in this brief history all the events to which the Society lent its interest during its existence, such as the building of St. Patrick’s Church (now Basilica), the formal opening of Notre Dame des Neiges Cemetery, the Golden and Diamond Jubilee of St. Patrick’s Church, St. Patrick’s Orphanage, Father Dowd’s Home and St. Mary’s Hospital, to name but a few.

In 1977, just over one hundred years since the destruction of St. Patrick’s Hall by fire, St. Patrick’s Square, a 252-unit pre-retirement building and community located in Côte St. Luc, was officially opened by Prime Minister Pierre Elliott Trudeau. The project was launched with seed funds provided by the Society in cooperation with the Federal Government, and through the leadership of the renowned Montreal architect and President of the Society, Joseph Dunne. The Society’s office has been situated there ever since.

The Society was originally responsible for maintaining the annual St. Patrick’s Day Parade, which was held under its auspices from 1834 to 1916. The event was discontinued in 1917 owing to war conditions, but was renewed the following year under the direction of the Ancient Order of Hibernians until 1928, and since that date the parade has been under the direction of the United Irish Societies of Montreal.

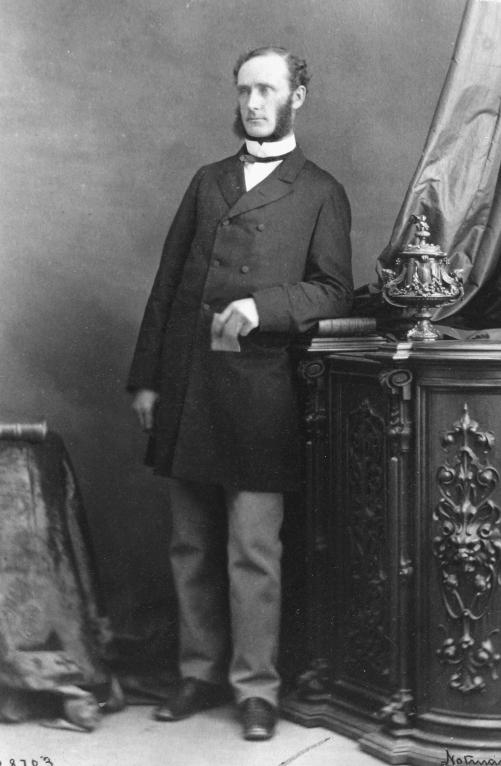
William Hales Hingston 1867

Of the six Irish mayors of Montreal in the nineteenth and early twentieth centuries – William Workman, Francis Cassidy, K.C., Sir William Hingston, James McShane, Richard Wilson-Smith and the Honourable James J. Guerin – all were members of St. Patrick’s Society of Montreal, and three were Presidents of the Society: Workman, Cassidy and Guerin. Other Past Presidents of the Society include a pre-Confederation co-premier of the Province of Canada and later federal minister of finance (Sir Francis Hincks), a federal minister of Justice (Charles J. Doherty) as well as a number of other prominent politicians, judges, business leaders and others.

After the various waves of nineteenth-century immigration from Ireland, by the turn of the twentieth century the membership of the Society essentially was composed of second-, third- and fourth-generation Irish-Canadians. By the mid-twentieth century, the Society’s main social celebrations and fundraising activities were its Annual Charity Ball and its Annual St. Patrick’s Day Luncheon, both of which had evolved from the original banquets and dinners of the early nineteenth century. A key feature of the Annual Charity Ball was and still is the presence of special invited guests, which include a special guest of honour and the presidents or other representatives of the Sister Societies, such as the St. Andrew’s Society, the St. David’s Society, the German Society, the Irish Protestant Benevolent Society and the United Irish Societies. The annual St. Patrick’s Day celebration is now a business-type luncheon, with a guest speaker (almost always with an Irish background) who has played a prominent role in politics, business, academia, the arts, law, journalism or otherwise.

Perhaps, as a result of the worldwide exposure for Montreal and Canada generated by Expo 67 and the celebrations surrounding Canada’s centennial, there was a new ripple of Irish immigration to Canada and Montreal in the late 1970s and 1980s. The Society and the Montreal Irish community were the beneficiaries of the contributions of this new generation of arrivals, who have contributed greatly to the preservation and enjoyment of Irish culture and tradition in Montreal. The Society’s newsletter, Nuacht, was largely the product of the 1970s- and 1980s-era immigrants. This period also saw the renewal of interest in things Irish, such as Irish traditional music, the Irish language, Irish dance, Irish theatre, Irish sports and Irish cinema. The Society took a leading role in promoting and financially supporting these cultural endeavours. The culmination of this renaissance of interest in Irish culture in Montreal was the creation of the Canadian Irish Studies Foundation in 1995. Members of the Society, most notably Michael Kenneally, Brian Gallery, Peter O’Brien and others, played leading roles in the effort to raise funds to provide courses in Canadian Irish studies at Concordia University, which itself is the successor institution of Loyola College which had long been associated with the Irish in Montreal. St. Patrick’s Society contributed the original seed money to launch the successful capital campaign of the Canadian Irish Studies Foundation, which raised millions of dollars. In 2010, due to overwhelming interest in the courses being offered and the great success of the capital campaign, the School of Canadian Irish Studies – the first in Canada – was created at Concordia University with the financial support of the university and the Canadian Irish Studies Foundation.

In 2009, as part of the year-long celebration of the Society’s 175th anniversary, the Society, in cooperation with the Irish Protestant Benevolent Society and the Government of Quebec, funded and launched a very successful year-long exhibition about the contributions of the Irish to Quebec life entitled “Being Irish O’Quebec” at the McCord Museum of Canadian History in Montreal.

The Society has evolved greatly since 1834, yet remains true to its roots. In 2011, the Society organized and sponsored welcoming receptions and job networking events for young Irish immigrants to Montreal, who were not fleeing discrimination and famine like many of the original members of the Society but rather declining economic conditions in Ireland.

In 1983, the Society admitted for the first time a woman, Beverly Rozek, to full membership and, in 1998, the members of the Society elected its first woman President, Lynn Lonergan Doyle.

To enable the Society to fund and carry out its mission, the Society has an endowment and organizes numerous major annual fundraising events. Together with the traditional Annual Charity Ball and the Annual St. Patrick’s Day Luncheon, the Society also holds an annual Christmas concert and an annual golf tournament. The moneys raised at these events fund the operations of the Society, which is a registered federal charity, allows the Society to organize and sponsors a large number of cultural and educational activities that are open to all and to make significant donations to other Montreal charities and not-for-profit organizations that serve the less fortunate, homeless, children, families and elderly of the city, both Irish and non-Irish.

== Presidents of the Society ==
The Society's presidents have come from a wide array of professions including politicians, lawyers, jurists, doctors, and educators.

- 1834-35 John Donnelan
- 1836-38 Benjamin Holmes
- 1839 P.N. Rossiter
- 1843 Benjamin Holmes
- 1844 William Workman
- 1845-48 Sir Francis Hincks K.C.M.G., P.C.
- 1852-53 Thomas Ryan
- 1854-55 W.P. Bartley
- 1856-57 Dr. Henry Howard
- 1858 Hon. Mr. Justice Marcus Doherty
- 1859 Bernard Devlin, Q.C.
- 1860 Edward Murphy, Q.C.
- 1861 Hon. Mr. Justice Marcus Doherty
- 1862 James A. Sadlier
- 1863-64 Thomas McKenna
- 1865-67 Bernard Devlin, Q.C.
- 1868 James E. Mullin
- 1869 F.B. McNamee
- 1870 Bernard Devlin, Q.C.
- 1871 Michael Donovan
- 1872 James Howley
- 1873 Francis Cassidy, Q.C.
- 1874-77 Bernard Devlin, Q.C.
- 1878 P.J. Coyle
- 1879-82 F.B. McNamee
- 1883 H.F. Bellew
- 1884-88 Denis Barry
- 1889-90 Hon. Henry J. Cloran
- 1891-92 Hon. Mr. Justice J.J. Curran
- 1893-94 Hon. James McShane
- 1895-97 Dr. James J. Guerin
- 1898-99 Dr. E.J.C. Kennedy
- 1900 W.E. Doran
- 1902-03 The Rt. Hon. Charles J. Doherty, K.C.
- 1904 Dr. E.J. Devlin
- 1905-06 Hon. Mr. Justice Frank J. Curran
- 1907-08 W.P. Kearney
- 1909-10 Henry J. Kavanaugh, K.C.
- 1911 Hon. Mr. Justice J.C. Walsh
- 1913-14 Dr. Walter G. Kennedy
- 1915 E. McG. Quirk
- 1916 G.H. Semple
- 1917 M.A. Phelan, K.C.
- 1918 Hon. John T. Hackett, K.C.
- 1919 Hon. Mr. Justice John D. Purcell
- 1920 Wm. M. Weir
- 1921-22 Dr. F. J. Hackett
- 1923-24 Dr. E.J.C. Kennedy
- 1925 Andrew E. Murray
- 1926-27 Dr. E. J. Mullally
- 1928 Dr. F. J. Hackett
- 1929-30 Councillor Leo J. McKenna
- 1931 Hon. Mr. Justice Frederick T. Collins
- 1932-33 J.P. Callaghan, K.C.
- 1934 Andrew E. Murray
- 1935-36 Judge John W. Long
- 1937 Alderman Owen Callary
- 1938-39 James C. Laffoley
- 1940-41 Dr. L.P. Nelligan
- 1942-43 Judge Emmett J. McManamy
- 1944-45 Richard E. Quinn
- 1947-48 J. Austin Murphy, Q.C.
- 1949 Gilbert Carroll
- 1950-51 Edmund J. Cooney
- 1952-53 Frederick O. Reynolds
- 1954-55 James J. Shanahan
- 1955-57 William P. Kierans
- 1957-59 W. Edgar Doyle
- 1959-61 Dr. J. Rae Carson
- 1961-63 James H. McMahon
- 1963-65 John H. Sullivan, K.C.L.J.
- 1965-67 Kenneth J. McKenna
- 1967-69 Denis F. Kindellan
- 1969-71 Joseph Dunne
- 1971-72 Charles H. Wayland
- 1972-73 John H. Sullivan, K.C.L.J.
- 1973-75 Frederick D. McCaffrey
- 1975-77 William A. Shannon
- 1977-79 Richard C. Cooper
- 1979-81 Patrick Wickham
- 1981-83 Hon. Mr. Justice James T. Kennedy
- 1983-85 Andrew W. Fogarty
- 1985-87 William H. Wilson
- 1987-89 Edward W. Tinmouth
- 1989-91 Donald W. McNaughton
- 1991-93 Dr. Gus Ó Gormáin
- 1993-96 Dr. Michael Kenneally
- 1996-98 Brian O’Neill
- 1998-2000 Lynn Lonergan Doyle
- 2000-02 J. Peter Shea
- 2002-04 Dr. Patrick Dunn
- 2004-06 Dr. John Little
- 2006-08 Mary McDaid
- 2008-10 Alistair O’Hara
- 2010-12 Patrick M. Shea
- 2012-14 Paul Dunne
- 2014-16 James Killin
- 2016-18 Scott Phelan
- 2018-20 Christie Brown
- 2020-22 Ken Quinn
- 2022-24 Pamela McGovern
- 2024- Carol McCormick
