= Ralliement créditiste du Québec candidates in the 1970 Quebec provincial election =

Slate of candidates in a 1970 Canadian election

The Ralliement créditiste du Québec fielded several candidates in the 1970 Quebec provincial election, twelve of whom were elected. Information about the party's candidates may be found on this page.

== Candidates ==
=== Labelle: Eugène Caraghiaur ===
Eugène Caraghiaur ran as a Social Credit or Créditiste candidate in two federal elections and one provincial election. He sided with Réal Caouette after the federal party's 1963 split. Caraghiaur identified as an engineer consultant.

Electoral record
| Election | Division | Party | Votes | % | Place | Winner |
|---|---|---|---|---|---|---|
| 1962 federal | St. Lawrence—St. George | Social Credit | 437 | 3.15 | 4/4 | John Turner, Liberal |
| 1965 federal | Sainte-Anne | Ralliement créditiste | 1,060 | 10.27 | 3/4 | Gérard Loiselle, Liberal |
| 1970 provincial | Labelle | Ralliement créditiste | 1,585 | 11.75 | 4/4 | Fernand Lafontaine, Union Nationale |
