= Paul Mercier =

Paul Mercier may refer to:

- Paul Mercier (actor) (born 1962), American voice actor and director
- Paul Mercier (playwright) (born 1958), Irish playwright and film director
- Paul Mercier (Bloc Québécois MP) (1924–2013), Canadian Member of Parliament in the 1990s
- Paul Mercier (Liberal MP) (1888–1943), Canadian Member of Parliament in the 1920s and 1930s
- Paul Mercier (1879–1966), co-founder of Baume et Mercier
