= LMCC =

LMCC may refer to:

- Licentiate of the Medical Council of Canada
- Lower Manhattan Cultural Council
- Lake Macquarie City Council
- “Like, Mirror, Collect, Comment” an engagement movement on Lens Protocol
