= Westmount—St. Henri =

Former federal electoral district in Quebec, Canada

Coordinates: 45.482°N 73.584°W

Quebec electoral district

Defunct federal electoral district
- Legislature: House of Commons
- District created: 1914
- District abolished: 1924
- First contested: 1917
- Last contested: 1921

Westmount—St. Henri was a federal electoral district in Quebec, Canada, that was represented in the House of Commons of Canada from 1917 to 1925.

This riding was created in 1914 from parts of Hochelaga riding. It consisted of the town of Westmount, St. Henri and Ste. Cunégonde wards of the city of Montreal.

The electoral district was abolished in 1924 when it was redistributed into Mount Royal, St. Antoine and St. Henri ridings.

== Members of Parliament ==
This riding elected the following members of Parliament:

Parliament	Years	Member	Party
Westmount—St. Henri; Riding created from Hochelaga
13th	1917–1921	Alfred Leduc	Opposition (Laurier Liberals)
14th	1921–1925	Paul Mercier	Liberal
Riding dissolved into Mount Royal, St. Antoine and St. Henri

== Election results ==
1917 Canadian federal election
Party	Candidate	Votes
Opposition (Laurier Liberals)	Alfred Leduc	7,987
Government (Unionist)	J.-P.-Albert Sévigny	6,975

1921 Canadian federal election
Party	Candidate	Votes
Liberal	Paul Mercier	17,583
Conservative	Wilfrid Lamarre	7,195

== See also ==
- List of Canadian electoral districts
- Historical federal electoral districts of Canada
