= Charles Doherty =

Canadian politician

The Right Honourable Charles Joseph Doherty PC KC
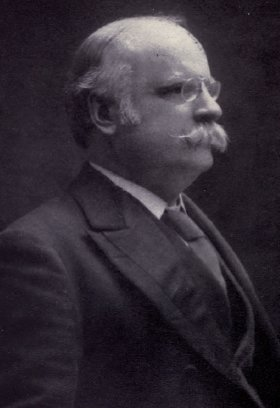
- The Rt Hon. Charles Joseph Doherty

Minister of Justice Attorney General of Canada
- In office October 10, 1911 – September 20, 1921
- Prime Minister: Robert Borden; Arthur Meighen
- Preceded by: Allen Bristol Aylesworth
- Succeeded by: R. B. Bennett

Personal details
- Born: May 11, 1855 Montreal, Province of Canada
- Died: July 28, 1931 (aged 76)
- Party: Conservative
- Other political affiliations: Unionist

Charles Joseph Doherty, PC, KC (May 11, 1855 – July 28, 1931) was a Canadian politician, lawyer, and judge from Quebec. He served as Minister of Justice from 1911 to 1921 and was one of Canada's representatives at the Paris Peace Conference.

== Early life and education ==
Doherty was born in Montreal, Canada East, the son of Marcus Doherty, an Irish-born judge of the Supreme Court for the Province of Quebec and Elizabeth (O'Halloran) Doherty. He attended St. Mary's (Jesuit) College and received a Bachelor of Laws degree from McGill University in 1876 winning the Elizabeth Torrance Gold Medal for highest academic achievement.

== Career ==
Doherty was admitted to the bar in 1877. He was a candidate for the Legislative Assembly of Quebec for the electoral district of Montreal West in the 1881 election, but was defeated. In 1885 he served as a lieutenant with the 65th Battalion, Mount Royal Rifles in the North-West Rebellion. He ran for office again for Montreal Centre in the 1886 election.

Doherty was created a Queen's Counsel in 1887. He worked as a lawyer and also taught civil and International law at McGill University prior to being appointed a judge on the Quebec Superior Court from 1891 until 1906. During this time he served as the president of the main Irish fraternal organization in Montreal, St. Patrick's Society in 1902 and 1903. In 1909 he became a professor of international and civil law at McGill University.

He was elected as the Conservative candidate to the House of Commons of Canada for the electoral district of St. Anne in the 1908 federal election. When the Tories won the 1911 election, the new Prime Minister, Sir Robert Borden, brought Doherty into the Canadian Cabinet as Minister of Justice.

Doherty played a role in the creation of the Canadian Bar Association in 1912 and served as its president in 1914.

At the end of World War I, Doherty was one of the Canadian delegates to the Paris Peace Conference, and served as Canadian delegate to the League of Nations from 1920 to 1922. He was appointed to the Imperial Privy Council in the 1920 New Year Honours for his service at Versailles, allowing him to use the title of "The Right Honourable".

Doherty remained Minister of Justice in the government of Arthur Meighen until its defeat in 1921.

== Archives ==
There is a Charles Joseph Doherty fonds at Library and Archives Canada.

== Electoral record ==
1911 Canadian federal election: St. Anne
Party	Candidate	Votes
Conservative	Charles Doherty	3,319
Liberal	Joseph Charles Walsh	2,566

By-election: On Mr. Doherty being appointed Minister of Justice, 10 October 1911

By-election on 27 October 1911
Party	Candidate	Votes
Conservative	Charles Doherty	acclaimed

== See also ==
- Guelph Raid

Parliament of Canada
Preceded by Joseph Walsh	Member of Parliament - St. Anne; 1908–1921	Succeeded by Joseph Walsh
Political offices
Preceded by Allen Bristol Aylesworth	Minister of Justice; 1911–1921	Succeeded by R. B. Bennett
