= Gérard Loiselle =

Canadian politician

Official 1974 portrait

Gérard Loiselle (15 April 1921 – 22 December 1994) was a Canadian politician. He was an eight-term Member of the House of Commons and was a City Councillor in Montreal, Quebec.

== Federal politics ==
Born in Montreal, Quebec, Loiselle successfully ran as an Independent Liberal candidate in the district of Sainte-Anne in 1957 defeating the official Liberal nominee. He was re-elected as a Liberal in 1958, 1962, 1963 and 1965. He ran in the district of Saint-Henri in 1968 and won. He was re-elected in 1972 and 1974. He did not run for re-election in 1979.

He was Parliamentary Secretary to the Minister of Manpower and Immigration from 1968 to 1969 and to the Minister of Transport from 1969 to 1970.

== City Councillor ==
He was elected to Montreal's City Council as an independent candidate in 1950 in the district of Sainte-Anne. He was re-elected in 1954, 1957, 1960, 1962 and 1966. He did not run for re-election in 1970.

== Electoral record (partial) ==
1957 Canadian federal election
Party	Candidate	Votes
Independent Liberal	LOISELLE, Gérard	7,771
Liberal	HUSHION, William James	4,254
Progressive Conservative	SULLIVAN, Gerald E.	2,807
Independent Liberal	SOWERY, Cliff	902

1958 Canadian federal election
Party	Candidate	Votes
Liberal	LOISELLE, Gérard	8,289
Progressive Conservative	SULLIVAN, Gerald	5,941
Independent	COLLETTE, Albert	1,256
Co-operative Commonwealth	KING, Paul Francis	394

1962 Canadian federal election
Party	Candidate	Votes
Liberal	LOISELLE, Gérard	7,737
Progressive Conservative	SULLIVAN, Gerald	4,478
New Democratic	MULCAHY, Bernard	627
Social Credit	HAMLET, Thomas James	381

1963 Canadian federal election
Party	Candidate	Votes
Liberal	LOISELLE, Gérard	7,215
Social Credit	COLLETTE, Albert	2,830
Progressive Conservative	VANLOO, A. Peter	1,963
New Democratic	MULCAHY, Bernard	753

1965 Canadian federal election: St. Ann
Party	Candidate	Votes	%
Liberal	Gérard Loiselle	6,150	59.60
Progressive Conservative	George Neill	2,283	22.12
Ralliement créditiste	Eugène Caraghiaur	1,060	10.27
New Democratic	Martin J. Ranalli	826	8.00
Total valid votes		10,319	
Total rejected ballots		254	
Turnout		10,573	64.02
Electors on the lists		16,515	

1968 Canadian federal election: Saint-Henri
Party	Candidate	Votes	%
Liberal	Gérard Loiselle	12,792	63.45
Independent	Pierre Sévigny	3,499	17.35
New Democratic	Gérard Philipps	1,491	7.40
Progressive Conservative	Pierre Hogue	972	4.82
Ralliement créditiste	Joseph Ranger	608	3.02
Independent Liberal	William Gaudreau	465	2.31
Independent	Lomer Pilote	335	1.66
Total valid votes		20,162	
Total rejected ballots		704	
Turnout		20,866	57.73
Electors on the lists		36,143	

== Footnotes ==
Political offices
Preceded by Thomas Patrick Healy (Liberal)	MP, District of Sainte-Anne; 1957-1968	Succeeded by The electoral district was abolished in 1966.
Preceded by Hilarion-Pit Lessard (Liberal)	MP, District of Saint-Henri; 1968-1979	Succeeded by Jacques Guilbault (Liberal)
