= William James Hushion =

Canadian politician and businessman (1883-1954)

The Hon. William James Hushion

Senator for Victoria, Quebec
- In office February 15, 1940 – January 29, 1954
- Appointed by: William Lyon Mackenzie King
- Preceded by: Edmund William Tobin
- Succeeded by: John Thomas Hackett

Member of the Canadian Parliament for St. Ann
- In office 1935–1940
- Preceded by: John Alexander Sullivan
- Succeeded by: Thomas P. Healy

Member of the Canadian Parliament for St. Antoine
- In office 1924–1925
- Preceded by: Walter George Mitchell
- Succeeded by: Leslie Gordon Bell

Member of the Legislative Assembly of Quebec for Montréal–Sainte-Anne
- In office 1923–1924
- Preceded by: Bernard-Augustin Conroy
- Succeeded by: Joseph Henry Dillon

Member of Montreal City Council

Member of Parliament for Saint-Joseph ward
- In office 1914–1928

Personal details
- Born: November 3, 1883 Montreal, Quebec
- Died: January 29, 1954 (aged 70) Montreal, Quebec
- Party: Liberal
- Other political affiliations: Quebec Liberal Party
- Profession: Businessman

William James Hushion (November 3, 1883 – January 29, 1954) was a Canadian businessman and politician.

Born in Montreal, Quebec, the son of Daniel Hushion and Margaret Phelan, he started working with his father and eventually started his own company, W. J. Hushion. He worked as a grain merchant, and was president of Dominion Distilleries Montreal Transfer Terminal Ltd., Seven Industries Ltd. and Clinton Distilleries Corporation, as well as vice-president of Montreal Distilleries Corporation. He was a director of several other companies: Hushion and Hushion Ltd., Canada Catering Co. Ltd., Rock Product Co. Ltd., Wesh Coal Corporation, Nu-Way Box Co. Ltd. and Quebec Flour Mills. He was listed as a promoter of Montreal and Quebec Products Exchanges Inc. He also volunteered with hospital boards, and was named governor for life of Hôpital Notre-Dame in 1923 and of St. Mary's Hospital in 1924. He was a member of several clubs, including Club de réforme, Mount Stephen Club, Club Saint-Denis, Club canadien, Club Senneville and Shamrock Athletic Association.

In 1916, he was defeated as a Liberal Party of Quebec candidate in the riding of Montréal–Sainte-Anne in the 1916 Quebec provincial election. He was also defeated as a Liberal Party of Canada candidate in the riding of St. Antoine in the 1917 federal election. He served on Montreal City Council from 1914 to 1928. He was elected in 1923 to the Quebec Legislative Assembly in the riding of Montréal–Sainte-Anne. He resigned in 1924 and was elected to the House of Commons of Canada in the riding of St. Antoine in a 1924 by-election. He was defeated in 1925 and 1930. He was re-elected in the 1935 federal election in the riding of St. Ann. He was summoned to the Senate of Canada in 1940 in the senatorial division of Victoria, Quebec. He served until his death in 1954. He is buried in the Notre Dame des Neiges Cemetery.

The Bain Hushion, a public bath at 757, rue des Seigneurs in Montreal, was named after him. The building was damaged by fire and permanently closed in 1988, but will be renovated into housing for aboriginal women.

He had a son, also named William James Hushion, who married Marielle Herdt. That couple had a son, William J. Hushion (April 16, 1940 – April 8, 2020), who owned a book distribution company, Hushion House.
