= Tommy Funebo =

Swedish politician

Christopher Edmark, formerly Tommy Funebo (born Tommy Niiranen March 15, 1960 in Själevad) took over from Tor Paulsson as Party Organizer of the Sverigedemokraterna (Swedish Democrats Party) at the beginning of 2001.

He was the éminence grise of the party until the end of 2003, when he claimed the party had "Nazi tendencies". He rejected collaboration with Belgian antisemite Bernard Mengal and instead joined the Sveriges Pensionärers Intresseparti (Senior Citizen Interest Party). He later became a Social democrat, and later a libertarian.
