= Canadian Patriotic Fund =

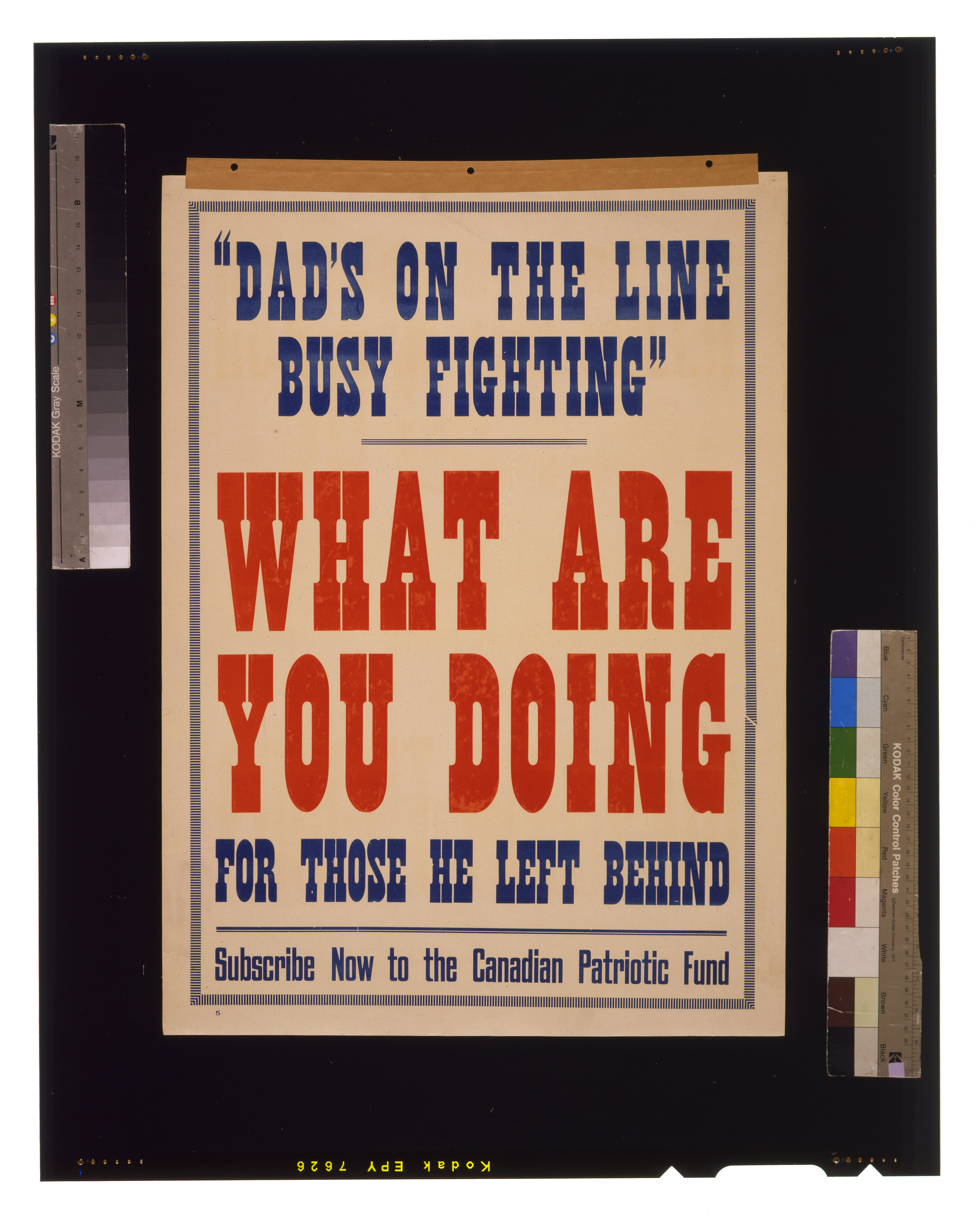
Canadian Patriotic Fund poster

The Canadian Patriotic Fund (1914–1919) was a private fund-raising organization incorporated in 1914 by federal statute and headed by Montreal businessman and Conservative Member of Parliament Sir Herbert Brown Ames.

The fund was established to give financial and social assistance to soldiers' families. By March 31, 1917, the Canadian Patriotic Fund had collected $22,981,616.

The Irish poet Michael A. Hargadon, who was a reporter with the Montreal Star, wrote a poem entitled To Those They Left Behind which was widely published in newspapers and magazines across Canada, and helped raise several million dollars in contributions towards the Canadian Patriotic Fund.

An earlier version of the Fund had operated during the Second Boer War for the same purpose, after being announced by Lord Minto, the Governor General of Canada, on January 12, 1900, as a way of coordinating the efforts of numerous smaller organizations that had been competing against each other. The earlier Fund was incorporated by Parliament on May 23, 1901 and raised $339,975.63 during its existence, with charitable disbursements to 1,066 recipients.

The CPF was a centralized fund administered in communities by local volunteer groups. Abuse of the system has been reported, including recipients being cut off arbitrarily based on the moral judgements of volunteers, who were often middle- and upper-class citizens. Some women were denied benefits for being seen to spend their money frivolously, or for being suspected of extramarital affairs while their soldier husbands were away. Examples of "extravagance" in spending: having a telephone at home, going out dancing, taking a taxi, shopping "in broad daylight." There was no appeal system.
