= An Act to incorporate the German Society of Montreal =

Act of Parliament of the Province of Canada

- By-Laws of the German Society (1893)

Parliament of the Province of Canada
- Citation: An Act to incorporate the German Society of Montreal, S.Prov.C. 1865, c. 60
- Enacted by: Parliament of the Province of Canada
- Royal assent: March 18, 1865

Legislative history
- Bill citation: Bill 53, 8th Parliament, 3rd Session
- First reading: February 21, 1865
- Second reading: March 14, 1865
- Third reading: March 16, 1865
- First reading: March 16, 1865
- Second reading: March 16, 1865
- Third reading: March 16, 1865

An Act to incorporate the German Society of Montreal (the Act) is a public act of the Parliament of the Province of Canada, introduced, passed and assented to in the 3rd Session of the 8th Parliament in 1865, the 28th year of the reign of Queen Victoria. The purpose of the legislation was to vest the German Society of Montreal, a charitable association founded in 1835 with corporate powers to better achieve its mission.

The introduction of Bill 53 (A bill to incorporate the German Society of Montreal) followed a petition (Petition 126) by Henry Meyer, Ernest Idler, J. P. Seybold, Gottlieb Reinhard, Christian Beck and David Maysenholder, being officers and members of the German Society in February 1865.

== Structure ==
The Act, which is consistent with other incorporation acts published in that time period, consists of a preamble followed by nine articles:

1. Certain persons incorporated
2. Management of affairs
3. By-laws continued.
4. Officers
5. Execution of Deeds
6. Corporation may collect subscriptions
7. Allowances made by Corporation not liable to be taken in execution
8. Annual report
9. Public Act

The Act permits the Society to make and amend its by-laws in any way, "in so far as they are not repugnant to the laws of this Province [of Canada]"

== Consolidation of Statutes after Confederation ==
After Canadian Confederation (1867), the powers of the provincial and the federal parliaments were divided. The Commission for the Revision and Consolidation of the General Statutes of the Province of Quebec found that acts like the German Society's incorporation act fell under provincial jurisdiction and should be considered private acts.

As a result of the 1888 revision of the Statutes of Quebec, the Act to incorporate the German Society of Montreal was listed in Appendix B of acts considered to be acts of private nature, and was thus not consolidated in the Revised Statutes of Quebec.

== Present Situation ==
The German Society continues to be governed under the provisions of the Act, together with by-laws passed under it. It has not sought to migrate its incorporation to the Province's Companies Act.

In the provincial statutes, there has been no mention of the Act since its entry in Volume II of the Revised Statutes of the Province of Quebec in 1888.
