= Hilarion-Pit Lessard =

Canadian politician

- Official 1968 portrait

Montreal city councillor
- In office 1957–1966
- Constituency: Saint-Henri ward

Member of Parliament for Saint-Henri
- In office March 1958 – June 1968

Member of Parliament for Lasalle
- In office June 1968 – September 1972

Personal details
- Born: 11 February 1913 Sainte-Germaine, Quebec, Canada
- Died: September 10, 1984 (aged 71)
- Party: Liberal
- Profession: Agent, garage owner/operator

Hilarion-Pit Lessard (1913-1984) was a Canadian politician. He was a five-term Member of the House of Commons and was a City Councillor in Montreal, Quebec.

== Background ==
He was born in Sainte-Germaine, Quebec on 11 February 1913.

== Federal Politics ==
Lessard successfully ran as a Liberal candidate in the district of Saint-Henri in 1958. He was re-elected in 1962, 1963 and 1965. He ran in the district of Lasalle in 1968 and won. He did not run for re-election in 1972.

== City Councillor ==
He was elected to Montreal's City Council as an Independent candidate in 1957. He was re-elected in 1960 and 1962. He lost his bid for re-election in 1966, against Civic candidate Guy Lacoste. He represented the district of Saint-Henri.

== Death ==
Pit Lessard died on September 10, 1984, due to heart failure.

== Footnotes ==
Political offices
Preceded by Joseph-Arsène Bonnier (Liberal)	MP, District of Saint-Henri; 1958-1968	Succeeded by Gérard Loiselle (Liberal)
Preceded by The district was established in 1966.	MP, District of Lasalle; 1968-1972	Succeeded by John Campbell (Liberal)
