= Roddick Gates =

Monumental gates at McGill University in Montreal, Canada

Coordinates: 45°30′13″N 73°34′29″W

Roddick Memorial Gates
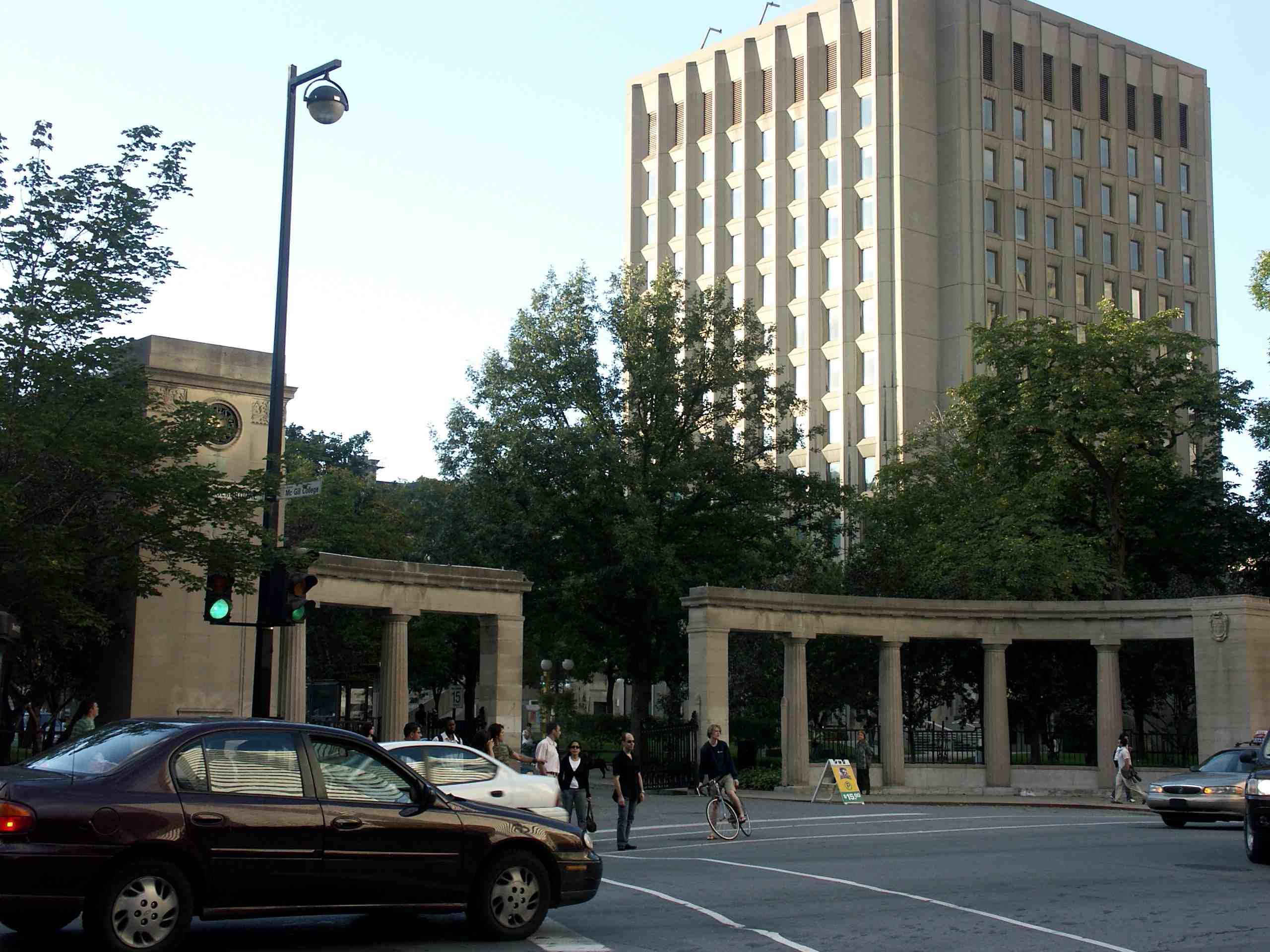
- The Roddick Gates and Burnside Hall
- Interactive map of Roddick Memorial Gates
- Location: Sherbrooke Street and McGill College Avenue, Montreal, Quebec, Canada
- Designer: Gratton D. Thompson
- Type: Monumental gates
- Beginning date: 1924
- Opening date: May 28, 1925
- Dedicated to: Thomas George Roddick

The Roddick Gates, also known as the Roddick Memorial Gates, are monumental gates in Montreal that serve as the main entrance to the McGill University campus. They are located on Sherbrooke Street West and are at the northern end of the very short but broad McGill College Avenue, which starts at Place Ville Marie.

== History ==
In 1924, Amy Redpath Roddick donated the Roddick Gates to McGill University in memory of her late husband, Sir Thomas George Roddick, a renowned doctor and dean of McGill's Faculty of Medicine from 1901 to 1908. Amy Redpath Roddick (May 16, 1868 – February 16, 1954) was the first-born child and only daughter of Ada Mills and John James Redpath. She became the second wife of Thomas Roddick on September 3, 1906.

Amy Redpath Roddick commissioned Grattan D. Thompson (1895–1971) to carry out the work on the monument. In 1922, Gratton D. Thompson had married Elizabeth Grace Redpath.

The Roddick Gates were formally opened by Amy Redpath Roddick on May 28, 1925. There are other significant buildings at McGill University that bear the Redpath family name, including the Redpath Library and the Redpath Museum.

The four clocks and Westminster Quarters Strike were made by the Seth Thomas Clock Company and the four bells by Meneely Bell Foundry. In 2010, the clocks were repaired by the Electric Time Company and rededicated.

Since April 2024, daily pro-Palestine protests have taken place at Roddick Gates in connection with the McGill student encampment. Since the dismantlement of the encampment the protests have been led by Samar Alkhdour.

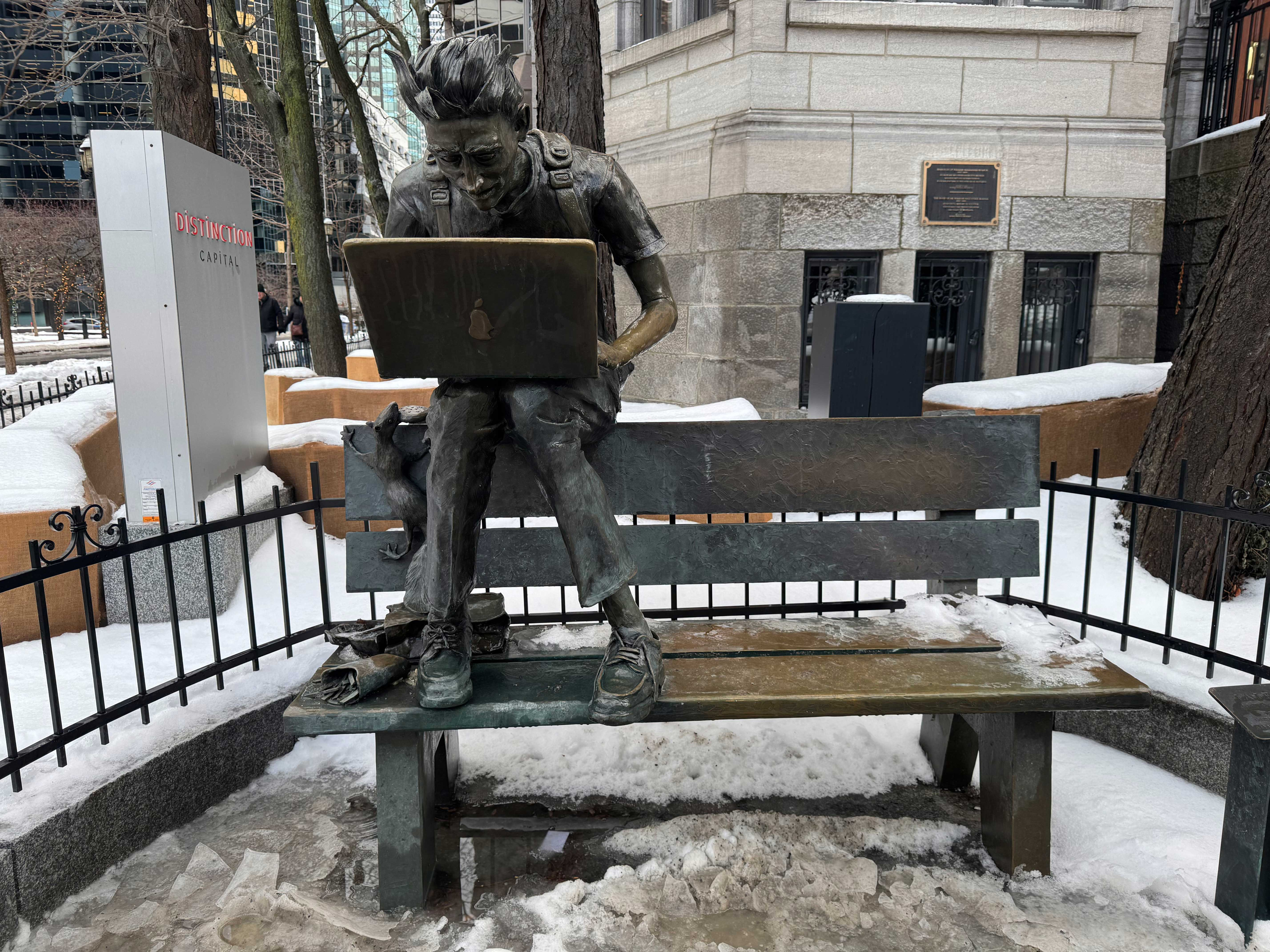
Bronze sculpture titled "La Leçon" ("The Lesson") by artist Cédric Loth

Since 2012, a satirical bronze sculpture commenting on student life, La Leçon (The Lesson), has faced Roddick Gates.
