= Michael James Walsh =

Canadian politician

Member of the Legislative Assembly of Quebec for Montréal division no. 6
- In office 1904–1908
- Preceded by: James John Edmund Guerin
- Succeeded by: Denis Tansey
- In office 1908–1912
- Preceded by: Denis Tansey
- Succeeded by: District was abolished in 1912

Personal details
- Born: September 2, 1858 Montreal, Canada East
- Died: May 2, 1933 (aged 74) Westmount, Quebec
- Resting place: Notre Dame des Neiges Cemetery
- Party: Liberal

Michael James Walsh (September 2, 1858 – May 2, 1933) was a Canadian politician.

Born in Montreal, Canada East, Walsh was a member of the Montreal City Council from 1902 to 1906. He was elected to the Legislative Assembly of Quebec for Montréal division no. 6 in 1904. A Liberal, he was defeated in 1908. He was elected in a 1908 by-election and was defeated in 1912.

He was a member of the Ancient Order of United Workmen and the Ancient Order of Hibernians.

He died in Westmount, Quebec in 1933.
