= Thomas George Roddick =

Canadian surgeon and politician (1846–1923)

Sir Thomas George Roddick
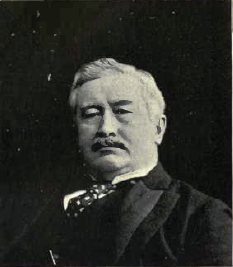

Member of the Canadian Parliament for St. Antoine
- In office 1896–1904
- Preceded by: The electoral district was created in 1892
- Succeeded by: Herbert Brown Ames

Personal details
- Born: July 31, 1846 Harbour Grace, Newfoundland
- Died: February 20, 1923 (aged 76) Montreal, Quebec, Canada
- Party: Conservative
- Spouse(s): Urelia M McKinnon, Amy Redpath Roddick
- Education: McGill University

Sir Thomas George Roddick (July 31, 1846 – February 20, 1923) was a Canadian surgeon, medical administrator, politician, and founder of the Medical Council of Canada born in Harbour Grace, Newfoundland.

He is known for his work in helping pass the "Roddick Bill" or the "Canada Medical Act" which through the Medical Council of Canada created standard national medical licensing process for medical practice in every province of Canada.

== Medical service ==
Thomas George Roddick attended the Model and Normal Schools in Truro, Nova Scotia, and graduated from the Medical Faculty of McGill University in 1868 with the highest honours, winning the Holmes Gold Medal and Final Prize. From 1868 to 1874, he was Assistant House Surgeon at the Montreal General Hospital. In 1872, he was appointed Lecturer on Hygiene at McGill University. He was appointed a Demonstrator of Anatomy in 1874 and in 1875 was named Professor of Clinical Surgery. Earlier in 1877, Roddick traveled to Edinburgh to witness Joseph Lister's medical antiseptic system. Roddick returned to Montreal later that year and introduced Joseph Lister's antiseptic system, primarily his 'carbolic spray,' revolutionizing the way medicine was practised in Montreal's Hospitals. In 1894 Roddick, with the aid of fellow specialist James Bell, created the Department of Surgery and became the first chief surgeon of the Royal Victoria Hospital. However, by 1901 Roddick found himself no longer able to practise surgery, having become allergic to the new antiseptic replacing the carbolic acid he had introduced to Montreal, iodoform. He was instead given the position of Dean of the Faculty of Medicine at McGill University from 1901 to 1908, where he could contribute to medicine without practising surgery. In subsequent years Roddick would play an instrumental role in the creation of the Medical Council of Canada as well as establishing a common system of examinations for students graduating with medical degrees in Canada.

== Military service ==
He has served on the Militia Force as Assistant Surgeon Grand Trunk Rifle Brigade, and Surgeon Major Prince of Wales Rifles. At the outbreak of the North-West Rebellion in 1885, he was selected to take charge of medical affairs in the field, with the rank of Deputy-Surgeon General of Militia. He organized the hospitals and medical service for the Expeditionary Force, and was recommended for C.M.G. by the General in command.

== Political service ==
He was elected to the House of Commons of Canada for the riding of St. Antoine in the 1896 federal election. A Conservative he was re-elected in 1900. Roddick was instrumental, after an arduous 18-year campaign, in helping pass the "Roddick Bill" or Canada Medical Act which created a national medical licensing standard that allowed physicians to practise in every province in Canada. With the creation of the Medical Council of Canada in 1912 Roddick was named first on the Canadian Medical Register.

He was President of the Canadian Medical Association and President of the British Medical Association. He was knighted in 1914.

== Family ==
He was married to Urelia M McKinnon of Pointe-Claire, Quebec, in 1880, but she died in Montreal in 1890. Then Amy Redpath Roddick became the second wife of Thomas Roddick on September 3, 1906. Amy Redpath Roddick (May 16, 1868 - February 16, 1954) was the first-born child and only daughter of Ada Mills and John James Redpath.

== Death and controversy ==
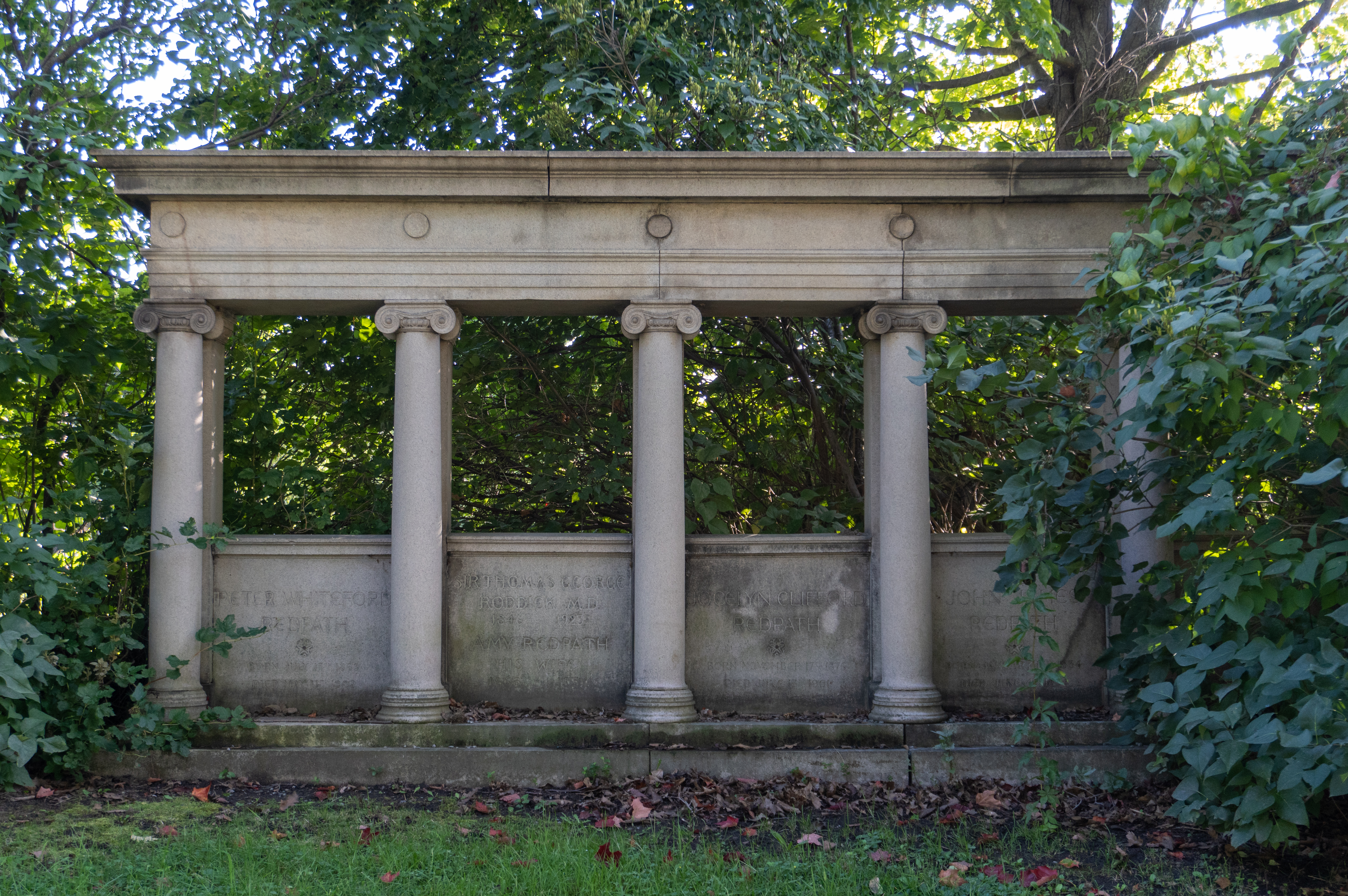
The Roddick family monument was designed to resemble the Roddick Gates of McGill.

Sir Thomas Roddick died on February 20, 1923, and was buried at Mount Royal Cemetery on February 22. However upon reading his Will on February 26, six days after his death and four days after his burial, the executors of his Will realized his final wishes had been to be cremated and demanded Sir Thomas be exhumed and cremated according to his wishes. Lady Roddick staunchly opposed his exhumation, stating her husband's final wishes had changed shortly before his death. The case was brought before the Quebec Superior Court and was successfully contested by Lady Roddick.

Roddick is buried at Mount Royal Cemetery in section L1 1, where Lady Roddick erected a family funerary monument for her husband which mirrored that which she had erected at McGill University in his honour, the Roddick Gates.

== Honours ==
- Sir Thomas Roddick Hospital built in the early 1950s by the American Government on the Ernest Harmon Air Force Base in Stephenville, Newfoundland is named in his honour.
- In 1906, the community of Eastern Brook, Newfoundland was renamed to Roddickton (now known as Roddickton-Bide Arm) in his honour.
- McGill University's Roddick Gates were erected by Amy Redpath Roddick and named in his honour.
- Roddick Fountain, in Harbour Grace, Newfoundland, is named in his honour.
- In 1914, he was knighted on behalf of King George V.

== Electoral record ==
1896 Canadian federal election: St. Antoine
Party	Candidate	Votes
Conservative	Thomas George Roddick	3,077
Liberal	Robert MacKay	2,904

1900 Canadian federal election: St. Antoine (electoral district)
Party	Candidate	Votes
Conservative	Thomas George Roddick	2,879
Liberal	Robert MacKay	2,792
