= Leslie Gordon Bell =

Canadian politician and lawyer (1889–1963)

Member of the Canadian Parliament for St. Antoine
- In office 1925–1935
- Preceded by: William James Hushion
- Succeeded by: Riding abolished in 1933 when it was redistributed into Saint-Henri, Saint-Antoine—Westmount and St. Lawrence—St. George

Personal details
- Born: December 4, 1889 Rapid City, Manitoba
- Died: September 8, 1963 (aged 73)
- Party: Conservative Party
- Occupation: Politician, lawyer

Leslie Gordon Bell (December 4, 1889 – September 8, 1963) was a Canadian politician and lawyer. He was elected to the House of Commons of Canada in 1925 as a Member of the Conservative Party to represent the riding of St. Antoine. He was re-elected in 1926 and 1930.
