= Patrick Kennedy (Canadian politician) =

Canadian politician

Member of the Legislative Assembly of Quebec for Montréal division no. 6
- In office 1892–1895
- Preceded by: James McShane
- Succeeded by: James John Edmund Guerin

Personal details
- Born: 1832 Trasersten, County Tipperary, Ireland
- Died: June 30, 1895 (aged 62–63) Montreal, Quebec
- Resting place: Notre Dame des Neiges Cemetery
- Party: Conservative

Patrick Kennedy (1832 – June 30, 1895) was an Irish-born contractor and political figure in Quebec. He represented Montréal division no. 6 in the Legislative Assembly of Quebec from 1892 to 1895 as a Conservative.

He was born in Trasersten, County Tipperary, the son of Edward Kennedy. He was a carter and general contractor. In 1861, he married Elizabeth Tracey. Kennedy served on Montreal city council from 1877 to 1883 and from 1887 to 1894. He was president of the Montreal police commission from 1882 to 1883. Kennedy died in office in Montreal at the age of 63 and was buried in the Notre-Dame-des-Neiges Cemetery.
