= Aldis Bernard =

Canadian politician

Mayor Aldis Bernard
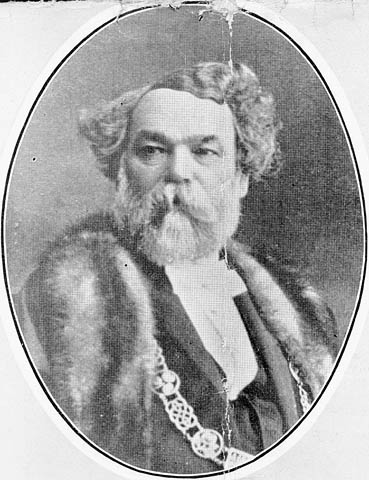

15th Mayor of Montreal
- In office June 1873 – 1875
- Preceded by: Francis Cassidy
- Succeeded by: William Hales Hingston
- Constituency: Montreal Centre

Personal details
- Born: c. 1810 Eastern Townships, Quebec ?
- Died: 3 July 1876 San Jose, California, United States
- Spouse(s): Mary Webb Meredith (?–1845); Sarah Couch (1852–1876)
- Profession: Dentist

Aldis Bernard (c. 1810 – 3 July 1876) was a Canadian dentist and politician, the Mayor of Montreal, Quebec between 1873 and 1875.

== Dental career ==
Bernard was educated in dentistry at Philadelphia, after which he practiced as a dentist in the southern United States. He married there and in 1840 moved back to Canada first residing in the Niagara Peninsula. In 1841, he settled in Montreal and established a dental practice there.

When the government was planning a governing organisation for doctors in 1847, Bernard lobbied to have dentistry included in the law that would establish the College of Physicians and Surgeons of Lower Canada. This effort was unsuccessful largely due to the medical establishment's negative view of dentistry at that time. The Dental Association of the Province of Quebec was eventually formed in 1869 with Bernard as its founding President.

== Political career ==
His first terms as a Montreal municipal councillor for Montreal Centre ward began in 1858 and ended in 1861. He returned to city politics in 1866 and again served as a councillor until the death of Mayor Francis Cassidy in June 1873. City Council then appointed Bernard as interim Mayor to serve out the remainder of Cassidy's term. Voters returned Bernard to the Mayor's post in the 1874 city elections. Under his leadership, urban parks such as Mount Royal Park and Dufferin Park were established. Work on a new city hall also commenced under Bernard's watch.

== Personal life ==
The circumstances of Bernard's birth have not been confirmed, but his obituaries suggest he was born in Quebec's Eastern Townships to United Empire Loyalist parents.

Mary Webb Meredith was Bernard's first wife until her death in 1845. He remarried in 1852 to Sarah Couch, a member of the Roman Catholic Church in contrast to Bernard's Protestant church membership. He had eight children, one of whom with his first wife.

Bernard did not seek another term as Mayor in 1875. He moved to San Jose, California shortly before his death in July 1876. His body was returned to Montreal for burial on 15 July 1876.
