= John Wait McGauvran =

Canadian politician

Member of the Legislative Assembly of Quebec for Montréal-Ouest
- In office 1873–1878
- Preceded by: Francis Cassidy
- Succeeded by: James McShane

Personal details
- Born: 1827 Glengarry, Upper Canada
- Died: July 20, 1884 (aged 56–57)
- Party: Conservative

John Wait McGauvran (c. 1827 – July 20, 1884) was a merchant and political figure in Quebec. He represented Montréal-Ouest in the Legislative Assembly of Quebec from 1873 to 1878 as a Conservative.

He was born in Glengarry County, Upper Canada, the son of Patrick McGauvran and Elizabeth Wait, and educated at Plantagenet. He owned several sawmills and was also the National Insurance Company director. McGauvran was a justice of the peace. He served as a member of the Montreal city council from 1864 to 1877 and also served as president of the aqueduct commission from 1866 to 1877. He was first elected to the Quebec assembly in an 1873 by-election held after the death of Francis Cassidy. McGauran was defeated when he ran for reelection in 1878. He was buried in the Notre Dame des Neiges Cemetery.
