= Joseph Charles Walsh =

Canadian politician

Member of the Canadian Parliament for St. Ann
- In office 1906–1908
- Preceded by: Daniel Gallery
- Succeeded by: Charles Doherty
- In office 1921–1925
- Preceded by: Charles Doherty
- Succeeded by: James John Edmund Guerin

Personal details
- Born: December 6, 1868 Montreal, Quebec
- Died: August 30, 1960 (aged 91)
- Party: Liberal

Joseph Charles Walsh (December 6, 1868 – August 30, 1960) was a lawyer, judge, journalist and political figure in Quebec. He represented St. Ann in the House of Commons of Canada from 1906 to 1908 and from 1921 to 1925 as a Liberal.

He was born in Montreal, the son of Matthew Walsh and Anastasia O'Brien, and was educated at the Collège Sainte-Marie de Montréal, the Université Laval in Montreal and McGill University. Walsh was admitted to the Quebec bar in 1895 and set up practice in Montreal. He contributed to the Montreal Star and Montreal Herald. Walsh was secretary for the Montreal bar from 1898 to 1899 and was crown prosecutor for Montreal district from 1910 to 1925. He was prosecutor in the murder trial of Adélard Delorme, a Roman Catholic priest accused of murdering his stepbrother.

Walsh was first elected to the House of Commons in a 1906 by-election held after the election of Daniel Gallery in 1904 was overturned. Walsh was defeated by Charles Joseph Doherty when he ran for reelection in 1908 and 1911. Walsh was named judge in the Quebec Superior Court for Montreal district in 1925. In 1932, he was named to the Court of King's Bench.

By-election on 21 November 1906
Party	Candidate	Votes
Liberal	Joseph Charles Walsh	2,409
Conservative	F. J. Curran	2,207

1908 Canadian federal election: St. Anne
Party	Candidate	Votes
Conservative	Charles Doherty	2,881
Liberal	Joseph Charles Walsh	2,811
