= German Society of Montreal =

- Native name: Société allemande de Montréal; Deutsche Gesellschaft zu Montreal
- Type: Nonprofit corporation, incorporated under the Act to incorporate the German Society of Montreal, Statutes of the Province of Canada, Cap. LX (1865 Vict. 28)
- Traded as: CRA BN 119115061RR0001
- Founded: April 21, 1835
- Headquarters: Montreal, Quebec, Canada
- Key people: Petra Hillebrand, President (since 2024)
- Subsidiaries: Relief and Welfare Fund of the German Society of Montreal
- Website: germansociety.ca

The German Society of Montreal (French: Société allemande de Montréal; German: Deutsche Gesellschaft zu Montreal) is a Montreal-based non-profit organization with the mission to promote the German language and culture in Montreal and to promote the health and welfare of Montrealers of all origins. The Society was founded as an association of German-speaking business people and professionals in 1835 and was incorporated by the Act to incorporate the German Society of Montreal, a public act of the Province of Canada in 1865. Today, the Society is an important social and cultural institution in Montreal's German and German-speaking community.

== Current Mission ==
The German Society's mission has evolved over the years. While the Society was founded to support German immigrants coming to Montreal (and Canada), the Society today supports all Montrealers regardless of origin. Today, the Society also works to support the German culture, heritage and language in Montreal, by working to make connections between different groups in Montreal such as the Alexander von Humboldt Schule Montréal and the Montreal Goethe-Institut. A monthly Stammtisch is held on the 3rd Wednesday of every month, which is open to members and non-members with interest in German language and culture.

The complete mission statement has four elements.

3.1 To bring together the German community and any having an interest in the community and to build bridges with other German institutions and associations.

3.2 To foster the German language and cultural heritage and, in general, be supportive of efforts to enhance the knowledge and appreciation of German language and culture in its diversity, evolution throughout history and manifestations in North America.

3.3 To aid needy members and other persons, who, because of failing health, misfortune or adverse circumstances, require help.

3.4 To support projects of other Canadian charitable organizations [...] in the Greater Montreal area whose objectives are such that participation or contributions by the Society would be considered a meaningful extension of the Society's own work. [...]

— Article 3.0

== History ==
=== 1835–1850s: early years ===
By-Laws of the German Society (1893)

After a private meeting in March 1835, initiated amongst others by the physician Dr. Daniel Arnoldi, the German Society of Montreal was formally founded on April 21, 1835, at the Hotel Nelson. The original purpose was to be the voice of the German minority in Montreal and to the support of anyone of German origin living and/or arriving in Montréal with "advice, information and assistance [to those] in need" (Gürttler, 1985, p. 3). At the first general meeting, the 81 founding members appointed Louis Gugy (at the time Sheriff of Montreal) as the first president of the Society.

Over the course of its history, the leaders and members of the Society have ranged from tradespersons such as butchers to professionals such as lawyers, politicians, business people, doctors and diplomats.

From early on, the Society was close to similar organizations focused on supporting newcomers, like the English St. George's Society of Montreal, the Scottish St. Andrew's Society of Montreal and the Irish St. Patrick's Society of Montreal, which were all founded around the same time. In the time leading up to the Rebellions of 1837, the Society, along with the other national societies in Montreal identified more closely with the British side. Over time, the German Society took a more neutral stance.

=== 1850s–1880s: immigration waves ===
Montreal was an important port for European immigrants coming to North America. Even though large numbers of Germans (and other Europeans) arrived in Montreal, not many remained in the city for long: most moved on to Canada's west or the United States. Nevertheless, the German Society played an important role in welcoming German(-speaking) immigrants and helping them get settled in the city. With its goal to support the welfare of the German community in Montreal, the Society also assisted the opening of a German-language church in the 1850s.

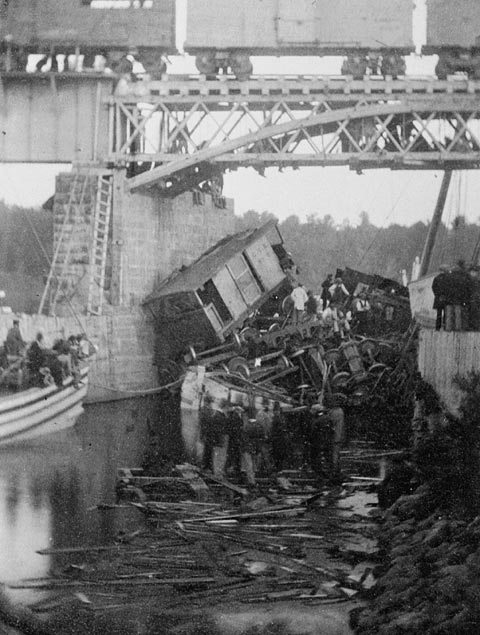
Train Disaster in Saint-Hilaire

On June 26, 1864, the several members of the German Society assisted in the rescue efforts of a major train disaster in Belœil/Saint-Hilaire. A Grand Trunk Railway train with 467 passengers, many recently immigrated Germans, failed to stop at an opened moveable bridge across the Richelieu River. Ninety-nine passengers and crew lost their lives in the accident. Following the tragedy, the Society arranged for the construction of a memorial at the Mont-Royal Cemetery.

The German Society of Montreal was granted the status of a corporation by the Parliament of the Province of Canada in 1865. The Act to incorporate the German Society of Montreal received royal assent on March 18, 1865.

The mass migration to Canada from Europe in the 1860s and 1870s increased the importance of the Society's charitable mission of helping needy immigrants. Many immigrants arriving in Montreal had no material means to support themselves, as they presumed the Canadian government would support them in getting settled in the country. As this was not the case, the Society played an important role in helping German immigrants with their immediate needs upon arrival in the Port of Montreal. The Society assisted immigrants in getting settled in Montreal, by supporting them with aid, and the finding of employment and housing. Good relationships with different shipping and railway companies allows the Society to negotiate fare discounts for Germans wishing to travel further west. During and after the Franco-Prussian War (which also contributed to the large flow of migrants to North America) the German Society's relief efforts were also directed to Germany to support widows and orphans.

Recognizing the issue, the German Society, along with other organizations pushed the government to implement harsher immigration policies to stop the migration of people without the means to support themselves. In 1868, the Canadian government adopted legislation and an order-in-council to restrict immigration to those with adequate means. The limited enforcement of these new policies, and the corrupt practices of immigration agents in Europe moved the Society to publish information campaigns in German newspapers and through the German Consulate General in Montreal, it also engaged with governments in Germany to take action against the flow of immigrants not able to support themselves to Canada.

==== Manitoba Project (1872–1874) ====
Under the leadership of land surveyor Wilhelm Wagner (President of the German Society 1867–1870), the German Society was granted one and a half townships in Manitoba with the goal of establishing a German community in that province. The agreement with the federal government was that the Society would find fifty families in the first year and then 100 families in every year after that to settle the township. Efforts of the Society and Wagner to promote immigration to Manitoba included the publishing of information brochures in German and a reduction of transportation fares. Nevertheless, the Society failed to meet its obligations, and the Surveyor General of Canada informed the Society in the fall of 1874 that the government would reclaim the townships, which due to changes in the political climate, the Hudson's Bay Company became interested in. The Society put to rest the Manitoba Project.

=== Leadership ===
Presidents of the society have come from a wide array of professions and trades, including politicians, diplomats, butchers, teachers, lawyers, doctors, and many others. Notable past presidents have included Daniel Arnoldi, Gerhard Lomer, and Dale C. Thomson.

== Membership ==
Membership in the society is open to all who wish and are willing to support the objectives of the organization. Since 1835, the membership has been fluctuating constantly, as can be seen in the data table below.

| Year | Membership |
|---|---|
| 1835 | 81 |
| 1839 | 31 |
| 1874 | 50 |
| 1893 | 100 |
| 1939 | 120 |
| 1958 | 160 |
| 1985 | 306 |
| 2011 | 172 |
| 2012 | 174 |
| 2014 | 192 |
| 2015-03-31 | 186 |
