= St. Ann (electoral district) =

Former federal electoral district in Quebec, Canada

Quebec electoral district

Defunct federal electoral district
- Legislature: House of Commons
- District created: 1892
- District abolished: 1967
- First contested: 1896
- Last contested: 1965

St. Ann (also known as St. Anne) was a federal electoral district in Quebec, Canada, that was represented in the House of Commons of Canada from 1892 to 1968.

It was created as "St. Anne" riding from parts of Montreal Centre in 1892. It consisted initially of the Centre, West and St. Anne's wards in the city of Montreal. In 1914, the riding's name was changed to "St. Ann", and it was redefined to consist of, in of the city of Montreal, the Centre, West and St. Ann's wards and the part of St. Gabriel ward south of the Grand Trunk Railway tracks; and the parish and town of Verdun (transferred from the county of Jacques-Cartier.

The electoral district was abolished in 1966 when it was redistributed into Lasalle, Saint-Henri and Saint-Jacques ridings.

== Members of Parliament ==
This riding elected the following members of Parliament:

| Parliament | Years | Member | Party |
|---|---|---|---|
St. Anne; Riding created from Montreal Centre
| 8th | 1896–1900 | Michael Joseph Francis Quinn | Conservative |
| 9th | 1900–1904 | Daniel Gallery | Liberal |
| 10th | 1904–1906 | Daniel Gallery | Liberal |
| 10th | 1906–1908 | Joseph Charles Walsh | Liberal |
| 11th | 1908–1911 | Charles Doherty | Conservative |
| 12th | 1911–1911 | Charles Doherty | Conservative |
| 12th | 1911–1917 | Charles Doherty | Conservative |
St. Ann
| 13th | 1917–1921 | Charles Doherty | Government (Unionist) |
| 14th | 1921–1925 | Joseph Charles Walsh | Liberal |
| 15th | 1925–1926 | James John Edmund Guerin | Liberal |
| 16th | 1926–1930 | James John Edmund Guerin | Liberal |
| 17th | 1930–1935 | John Alexander Sullivan | Conservative |
| 18th | 1935–1940 | William James Hushion | Liberal |
| 19th | 1940–1945 | Thomas Healy | Liberal |
| 20th | 1945–1949 | Thomas Healy | Liberal |
| 21st | 1949–1953 | Thomas Healy | Liberal |
| 22nd | 1953–1957 | Thomas Healy | Liberal |
| 23rd | 1957–1958 | Gérard Loiselle | Independent Liberal |
| 24th | 1958–1962 | Gérard Loiselle | Liberal |
| 25th | 1962–1963 | Gérard Loiselle | Liberal |
| 26th | 1963–1965 | Gérard Loiselle | Liberal |
| 27th | 1965–1968 | Gérard Loiselle | Liberal |
Riding dissolved into Lasalle, Saint-Henri and Saint-Jacques

== Election results ==
=== St. Anne, 1896–1917 ===
1896 Canadian federal election
| Party | Candidate | Votes |
|---|---|---|
| Conservative | Michael Joseph Francis Quinn | 3,071 |
| Liberal | James McShane | 2,952 |

1900 Canadian federal election
| Party | Candidate | Votes |
|---|---|---|
| Liberal | Daniel Gallery | 2,670 |
| Conservative | Michael Joseph Francis Quinn | 2,369 |

1904 Canadian federal election
| Party | Candidate | Votes |
|---|---|---|
| Liberal | Daniel Gallery | 2,895 |
| Conservative | M. J. Morrison | 2,165 |

By-election: On election being declared void, 12 October 1906

By-election on 21 November 1906
| Party | Candidate | Votes |
| Liberal | Joseph Charles Walsh | 2,409 |
| Conservative | F. J. Curran | 2,207 |

1908 Canadian federal election
| Party | Candidate | Votes |
|---|---|---|
| Conservative | Charles Doherty | 2,881 |
| Liberal | Joseph Charles Walsh | 2,811 |

1911 Canadian federal election
| Party | Candidate | Votes |
|---|---|---|
| Conservative | Charles Doherty | 3,319 |
| Liberal | Joseph Charles Walsh | 2,566 |

By-election: On Mr. Doherty being appointed Minister of Justice, 10 October 1911

By-election on 27 October 1911
| Party | Candidate | Votes |
| Conservative | Charles Doherty | acclaimed |

=== St. Ann, 1917–1968 ===
1917 Canadian federal election
| Party | Candidate | Votes |
|---|---|---|
| Government (Unionist) | Charles Doherty | 8,346 |
| Opposition (Laurier Liberals) | James John Edmund Guérin | 4,416 |
| Independent | Daniel Gallery | 319 |

1921 Canadian federal election
| Party | Candidate | Votes |
|---|---|---|
| Liberal | Joseph Charles Walsh | 10,742 |
| Conservative | Thomas Joseph Coonan | 5,494 |
| Independent | Adélard Wilfred Lanouette | 1,081 |

1925 Canadian federal election
| Party | Candidate | Votes |
|---|---|---|
| Liberal | James John Edmund Guerin | 10,242 |
| Conservative | Thomas O'Connell | 9,914 |
| Labour | Joseph Tremblay | 687 |

1926 Canadian federal election
| Party | Candidate | Votes |
|---|---|---|
| Liberal | James John Edmund Guerin | 11,238 |
| Conservative | Thomas O'Connell | 9,474 |

1930 Canadian federal election
| Party | Candidate | Votes |
|---|---|---|
| Conservative | John Alexander Sullivan | 11,384 |
| Liberal | James John Edmund Guerin | 11,017 |

1935 Canadian federal election
| Party | Candidate | Votes |
|---|---|---|
| Liberal | William James Hushion | 4,274 |
| Liberal | Joseph Henry Dillon | 3,818 |
| Independent Liberal | Francis Joseph Hogan | 3,137 |
| Conservative | Louis Edward Curran | 2,145 |
| Labour | Robert Yates Menary | 1,301 |
| Reconstruction | John Woffenden | 713 |
| Liberal–Labour | Cléophas Saint-Aubin | 229 |

1940 Canadian federal election
| Party | Candidate | Votes |
|---|---|---|
| Liberal | Thomas Healy | 12,687 |
| National Government | Patrick T. Lynch | 2,806 |
| Independent Liberal | Gabriel Edward Gawronski | 450 |
| Independent Liberal | Frederick S. Lawrence | 257 |

1945 Canadian federal election
| Party | Candidate | Votes |
|---|---|---|
| Liberal | Thomas Healy | 11,007 |
| Independent Progressive Conservative | William Adam Clarke | 2,381 |
| Co-operative Commonwealth | Angus Rose | 1,375 |
| Independent | Salluste Lavery | 751 |
| Social Credit | Beulah Devlin Grace | 224 |

1949 Canadian federal election
| Party | Candidate | Votes |
|---|---|---|
| Liberal | Thomas Healy | 14,528 |
| Independent Progressive Conservative | Patrick Thomas Lynch | 4,257 |
| Co-operative Commonwealth | Michael McManiman | 457 |
| Independent | Richard Allan Foley | 450 |
| Progressive Conservative | Cléophas Langlois | 443 |

1953 Canadian federal election
| Party | Candidate | Votes |
|---|---|---|
| Liberal | Thomas Healy | 15,519 |
| Progressive Conservative | Ernie Mundey | 1,768 |
| Independent Liberal | Michael McBrine | 477 |
| Co-operative Commonwealth | Harold Atwill | 385 |
| Labor–Progressive | Stanley Dobrowolsky | 381 |

1957 Canadian federal election
| Party | Candidate | Votes |
|---|---|---|
| Independent Liberal | Gérard Loiselle | 7,771 |
| Liberal | William James Hushion | 4,254 |
| Progressive Conservative | Gerald E. Sullivan | 2,807 |
| Independent Liberal | Cliff Sowery | 902 |

1958 Canadian federal election
| Party | Candidate | Votes |
|---|---|---|
| Liberal | Gérard Loiselle | 8,289 |
| Progressive Conservative | Gerald Sullivan | 5,941 |
| Independent | Albert Collette | 1,256 |
| Co-operative Commonwealth | Paul Francis King | 394 |

1962 Canadian federal election
| Party | Candidate | Votes |
|---|---|---|
| Liberal | Gérard Loiselle | 7,737 |
| Progressive Conservative | Gerald Sullivan | 4,478 |
| New Democratic | Bernard Mulcahy | 627 |
| Social Credit | Thomas James Hamlet | 381 |

1963 Canadian federal election
| Party | Candidate | Votes |
|---|---|---|
| Liberal | Gérard Loiselle | 7,215 |
| Social Credit | Albert Collette | 2,830 |
| Progressive Conservative | A. Peter Vanloo | 1,963 |
| New Democratic | Bernard Mulcahy | 753 |

1965 Canadian federal election
| Party | Candidate | Votes |
|---|---|---|
| Liberal | Gérard Loiselle | 6,150 |
| Progressive Conservative | George Neill | 2,283 |
| Ralliement créditiste | Eugène Caraghiaur | 1,060 |
| New Democratic | Martin J. Ranalli | 826 |

== See also ==
- List of Canadian electoral districts
- Historical federal electoral districts of Canada
