= Joseph-Arsène Bonnier =

Canadian politician

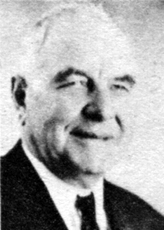

Member of the Canadian Parliament for St. Henry (1938-1949) St-Henri (1949-1953) Saint-Henri (1953-1958)
- In office 1938–1958
- Preceded by: Paul Mercier
- Succeeded by: Hilarion-Pit Lessard

Personal details
- Born: November 25, 1879 Saint-Urbain, Quebec
- Died: August 20, 1962 (aged 82)
- Party: Liberal
- Occupation: contractor person of independent means undertaker

Joseph-Arsène Bonnier (November 25, 1879 - August 20, 1962) was a Canadian politician, contractor, person of independent means and undertaker.

Born in Saint-Urbain, Quebec, Canada, Bonnier was elected to the House of Commons of Canada in a 1938 by-election for the riding of St. Henry to represent the Liberal Party. He was re-elected in 1945, 1949, 1953 and 1957. Prior to his federal political career, he was an alderman for Montreal, Quebec between 1936 and 1942.
