= St. Antoine (electoral district) =

Former federal electoral district in Quebec, Canada

Quebec electoral district

Defunct federal electoral district
- Legislature: House of Commons
- District created: 1892
- District abolished: 1933
- First contested: 1896
- Last contested: 1930

St. Antoine (French: Saint-Antoine) was a federal electoral district in Quebec, Canada, that was represented in the House of Commons of Canada from 1892 to 1935.

This riding was created in 1892 from parts of Montreal West riding. It consisted initially of St. Antoine ward in the city of Montreal. In 1914, it was defined to consist of St. Andrew's and St. Joseph wards in the city of Montreal.

The electoral district was abolished in 1933 when it was redistributed into Saint-Henri, Saint-Antoine—Westmount and St. Lawrence—St. George ridings.

== Members of Parliament ==
This riding elected the following members of Parliament:

Parliament	Years	Member	Party
St. Antoine; Riding created from Montreal West
8th	1896–1900	Thomas George Roddick	Conservative
9th	1900–1904	Thomas George Roddick	Conservative
10th	1904–1908	Herbert Ames	Conservative
11th	1908–1911	Herbert Ames	Conservative
12th	1911–1917	Herbert Ames	Conservative
13th	1917–1921	Herbert Ames	Government (Unionist)
14th	1921–1924	Walter George Mitchell	Liberal
14th	1924–1925	William James Hushion	Liberal
15th	1925–1926	Leslie Gordon Bell	Conservative
16th	1926–1930	Leslie Gordon Bell	Conservative
17th	1930–1935	Leslie Gordon Bell	Conservative
Riding dissolved into St. Henry, Saint-Antoine—Westmount and St. Lawrence—St. George

== Election results ==
1896 Canadian federal election
Party	Candidate	Votes
Conservative	Thomas George Roddick	3,077
Liberal	Robert MacKay	2,904

1900 Canadian federal election
Party	Candidate	Votes
Conservative	Thomas George Roddick	2,879
Liberal	Robert MacKay	2,792

1904 Canadian federal election
Party	Candidate	Votes
Conservative	Herbert Ames	3,342
Liberal	P. Lyall	2,692

1908 Canadian federal election
Party	Candidate	Votes
Conservative	Herbert Ames	3,538
Liberal	Robert Cooper Smith	2,676

1911 Canadian federal election
Party	Candidate	Votes
Conservative	Herbert Ames	4,677
Liberal	Milton Lewis Hersey	2,668

1917 Canadian federal election
Party	Candidate	Votes
Government (Unionist)	Herbert Ames	5,663
Opposition (Laurier Liberals)	William James Hushion	2,549

1921 Canadian federal election
Party	Candidate	Votes
Liberal	Walter George Mitchell	9,056
Conservative	William Gillies Ross	5,274

By-election: On Mr. Mitchell's resignation, 14 May 1924

By-election on 2 September 1924
Party	Candidate	Votes
Liberal	William James Hushion	4,792
Conservative	William Massey Birks	4,003

1925 Canadian federal election
Party	Candidate	Votes
Conservative	Leslie Gordon Bell	6,433
Liberal	William James Hushion	5,927

1926 Canadian federal election
Party	Candidate	Votes
Conservative	Leslie Gordon Bell	6,605
Liberal	John Jennings Creelman	6,159

1930 Canadian federal election
Party	Candidate	Votes
Conservative	Leslie Gordon Bell	7,192
Liberal	William James Hushion	5,185

== See also ==
- List of Canadian electoral districts
- Historical federal electoral districts of Canada
