= Party organizer =

A party organizer or local party organizer is a position in some political parties in charge of the establishing a party organization in a certain locality.

Herbert Ames wrote in his 1911 article "Organization of Political Parties in Canada" :

It is the aim of the party to have every county in Canada come under the supervision of some permanent organization. <...> A central office <...> is created for such a group. Here is installed a salaried official, party organizer. His duty is to revive existing local political organizations throughout the constituencies, to assist their members by correspondence and occasional visits, and, where there is as yet no political club, to gather together the sympathetic, and aid in forming a working combination. The main objective of the party organizer is to create the machinery whereby a truly representative convention may be convened, and acceptable candidate chosen, and the organization for securing success at the polls brought into being.

== See also ==
- Union organizer
