= Michael Joseph Francis Quinn =

Canadian politician

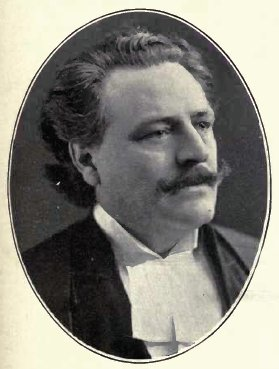

Member of the Canadian Parliament for St. Anne
- In office 1896–1900
- Preceded by: The electoral district was created in 1892.
- Succeeded by: Daniel Gallery

Personal details
- Born: November 19, 1851 Kingston, Canada West
- Died: December 6, 1903 (aged 52)
- Party: Conservative

Michael Joseph Francis Quinn (November 19, 1851 – December 6, 1903) was a Canadian politician.

Born in Kingston, Canada West, Quinn was a lawyer by profession. He was elected to the House of Commons of Canada for the Quebec electoral district of St. Anne in the 1896 federal election. A Conservative, he was defeated in 1900.

== Electoral history ==
1887 Canadian federal election: Châteauguay
Party	Candidate	Votes
Liberal	Edward Holton	1,120
Conservative	Michael Joseph Francis Quinn	767

1896 Canadian federal election: St. Anne
Party	Candidate	Votes
Conservative	Michael Joseph Francis Quinn	3,071
Liberal	James McShane	2,952

1900 Canadian federal election: St. Anne
Party	Candidate	Votes
Liberal	Daniel Gallery	2,670
Conservative	Michael Joseph Francis Quinn	2,369
