= Jacques Grenier =

Canadian businessman and politician

Mayor Jacques Grenier
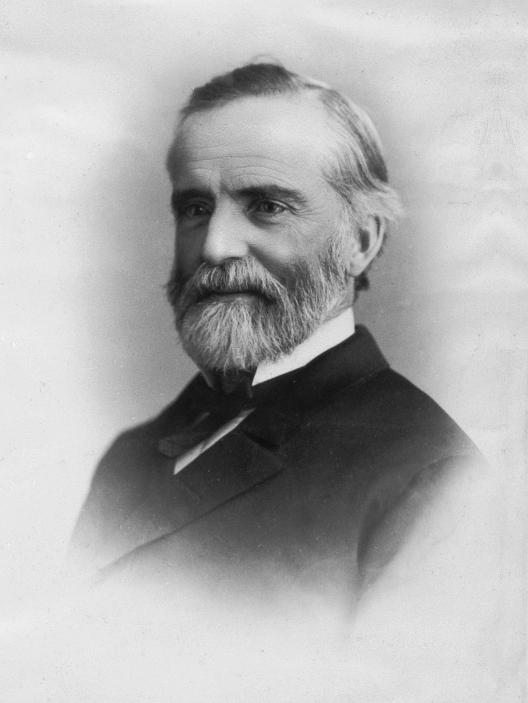

20th Mayor of Montreal
- In office 1 March 1889 – 2 February 1891
- Preceded by: John Abbott
- Succeeded by: James McShane
- Constituency: Saint-Jacques

Personal details
- Born: 20 January 1823 Berthier-en-Haut, Lower Canada
- Died: 5 March 1909 (aged 86) Montreal, Quebec, Canada
- Profession: businessman

Jacques Grenier (20 January 1823 – 5 March 1909) was a Canadian businessman and politician. He was mayor of Montreal.

== Background ==
He was born in Berthierville.

== Provincial ==
He was the Liberal candidate to the provincial legislature in the district of Montréal-Est in 1878, but lost against Louis-Olivier Taillon.

== City Councillor ==
Grenier was a City Councillor in Montreal from 1857 to 1860, from 1861 to 1865, from 1872 to 1873 and from 1874 to 1889. He resigned in 1889 to run for Mayor.

== Mayor of Montreal ==
He was elected Mayor of Montreal in 1889, was re-elected in 1890, but was defeated in 1891.

After his death in 1909, he was entombed at the Notre Dame des Neiges Cemetery in Montreal.
