= Montréal division no. 6 =

Quebec electoral district

Defunct provincial electoral district
- Legislature: National Assembly of Quebec
- District created: 1890
- District abolished: 1912
- First contested: 1890
- Last contested: 1908 (by-election)

Montréal division no. 6 (or Montréal no. 6) was a former provincial electoral district in the Montreal region of Quebec, Canada that elected members to the Legislative Assembly of Quebec.

It was created for the 1890 election from part of Montréal-Centre electoral district. Its final general election was in 1908 (and there was a by-election later that year). It disappeared in the 1912 election and its successor electoral districts were Montréal–Sainte-Anne, Montréal–Saint-Georges, and Montréal–Saint-Laurent.

== Members of the Legislative Assembly ==
- James McShane, Liberal (1890–1892)
- Patrick Kennedy, Conservative (1892–1895)
- James John Edmund Guerin, Liberal (1895–1904)
- Michael James Walsh, Liberal (1904–1908)
- Denis Tansey, Conservative (1908)
- Michael James Walsh, Liberal (1908–1912)
