= John Alexander Sullivan =

Canadian politician

Member of Parliament for St. Ann
- In office July 1930 – August 1935
- Preceded by: James John Edmund Guerin
- Succeeded by: William James Hushion

Personal details
- Born: John Alexander Sullivan; 15 August 1879 Beauharnois, Quebec, Canada
- Died: 11 August 1952 (aged 72)
- Party: Conservative
- Spouse(s): Corinne Bourgouin m. 11 May 1908
- Profession: lawyer

John Alexander Sullivan (15 August 1879 – 11 August 1952) was a Conservative member of the House of Commons of Canada. He was born in Beauharnois, Quebec and became a lawyer.

Sullivan attended schools at Valleyfield, Quebec and at Montreal. He became president of Sullivan Gold Mines Ltd. and was the vice-president of the Bar of Montreal at one point.

He was first elected to Parliament at the St. Ann riding in the 1930 general election after unsuccessful campaigns at the Châteauguay—Huntingdon riding in 1925 and 1926. After serving only one term in the House of Commons, Sullivan did not seek re-election in 1935.
