= Daniel Gallery =

Canadian politician

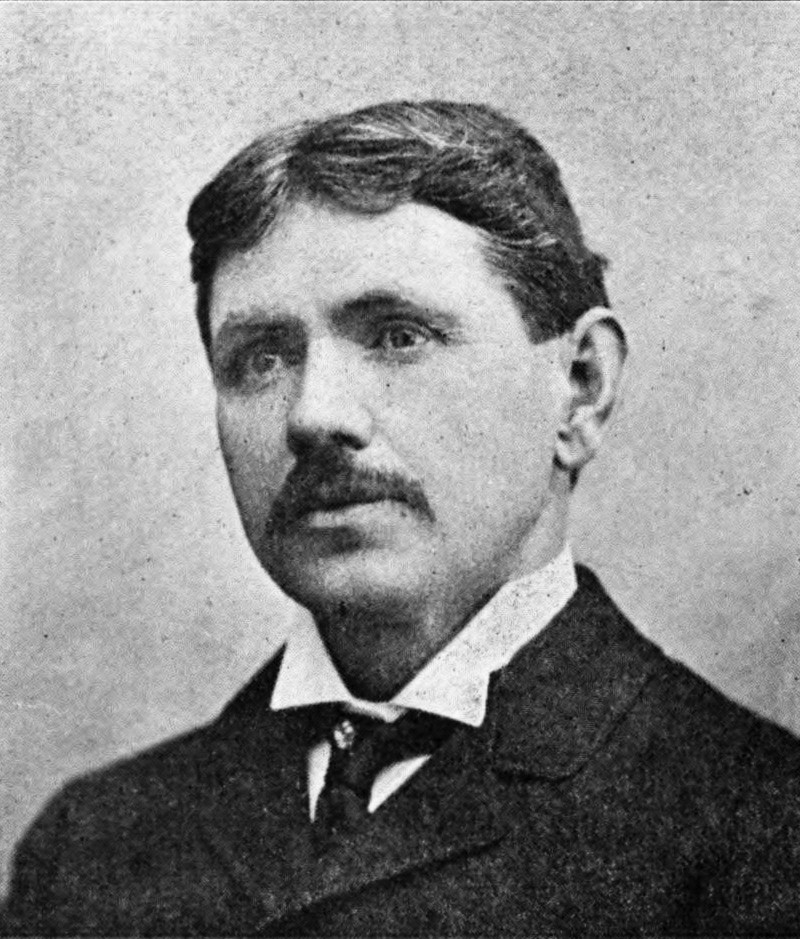

Member of the Canadian Parliament for St. Anne
- In office 1900–1906
- Preceded by: Michael Joseph Francis Quinn
- Succeeded by: Joseph Charles Walsh

Personal details
- Born: April 13, 1859 Slievedooley, County Clare, Ireland
- Died: November 9, 1920 (aged 61) Montreal
- Party: Liberal; Independent (1917)
- Spouse: Mathilda O'Neill
- Relations: John Daniel Gallery
- Education: Christian Brothers
- Occupation: merchant

Daniel Gallery (April 13, 1859 – November 9, 1920) was an Irish-born Canadian politician.

Born near Labasheeda, in Slievedooley, County Clare, Ireland, the son of Thomas Gallery and Mary O'Neill. Daniel Gallery moved with his fathers and brothers to Montreal Quebec in the early 1860s, after his father Thomas was evicted from his farms at Slievedooley. Daniel's brother John set up a successful large bakery in Montreal Gallery Brothers.

Daniel Gallery was educated at the Christian Brothers' School. A merchant, he was an Alderman from 1898 to 1903 and acting mayor. For four years Daniel was School Commissioner of the Catholic Schools Board in Montreal. He visited Ireland in 1907 as part of a delegation from the Montreal Educational Commission, visited the Presentation brothers in Cork and was instrumental in bringing the Brothers to Canada in 1910 to improve education for English speaking Catholics. He was a lifetime member of the Young Irishman's Literary and Benefit Association.

He was first elected to the House of Commons of Canada at the general elections of 1900. He served as Liberal Party Whip from 1902 on. He was re-elected at the general elections of 1904. A Liberal, he served until 1906 when the election was declared void. He was defeated in the 1917 federal election when he ran as an independent.

Once World War 1 broke out Daniel was instrumental in setting up a Home Guard in Montreal.

He was a member of several benevolent societies including the Catholic Order of Foresters and the Knights of Columbanus. He was Vice President of the Ancient Order of Hibernians. In 1894 Daniel was Grand Marshal of the Montreal St Patrick's day parade.

Daniel was extremely proud of his Irish heritage and descent and was a big promoter of Home Rule for Ireland. His obituary mentions his paternal descent from some prominent Clare families Sheehy, McMahon and Lysaght and his maternal descent from the O'Neills originally Earls of Dungannon and that his maternal Grandfather John O'Neill was a prominent supporter of O'Connell.

Daniel was married to Mathilda O'Neill, they had seven daughters and one son.

"Gallery Square" was named after Daniel Gallery in 1930 and still exists in Griffintown in Montreal.

1904 Canadian federal election: St. Anne
Party	Candidate	Votes
Liberal	Daniel Gallery	2,895
Conservative	M. J. Morrison	2,165
