= Alfred Leduc =

Canadian politician (1868-1957)

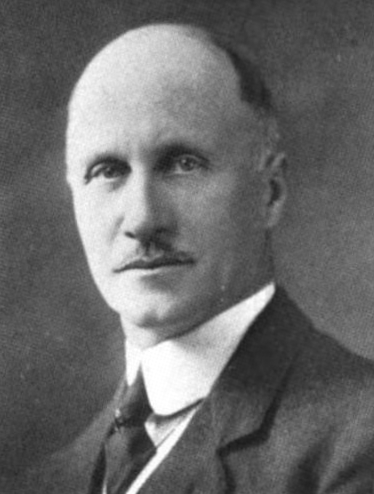
- Born: August 2, 1868; Montreal, Quebec, Canada
- Died: June 24, 1957 (aged 88); Westmount, Quebec, Canada
- Burial place: Notre Dame des Neiges Cemetery
- Occupations: Merchant, politician
- Relatives: Pierre Laporte (grandson)

Joseph Alfred Leduc (August 2, 1868 – June 24, 1957) was a Canadian merchant and political figure in Quebec. He represented Westmount—St. Henri in the House of Commons of Canada as a Laurier Liberal from 1917 to 1921 and Montréal–Saint-Henri in the Legislative Assembly of Quebec from 1927 to 1931 as a Liberal.

== Biography ==
He was born in Montreal on August 2, 1868, the son of Édouard Leduc, a butcher, and Marie-Louise Marcotte, and was educated at the École Saint-Joseph, at the Collège de Montréal and the Academy of the Archbishop of Montreal. He worked as a clerk and then as a master butcher in his father's business. In 1889, with his brother, he took over the operation of the family business. In 1892, he married Eugénie Claude. Leduc was vice-president of the Montreal Livestock Exchange. From 1900 to 1905, he was president of the Butcher's Association in Montreal. Leduc served on the board of governors for the Hôpital Notre-Dame, the Hôpital Western and the Westmount YMCA. Leduc served on the town council for Saint-Henri from 1894 to 1897 and from 1902 to 1903 and for Sainte-Cunégonde from 1903 to 1905. He died at his home in Westmount on June 24, 1957, at the age of 88, and was buried in the Notre Dame des Neiges Cemetery.

Leduc was the grandfather of Guy Leduc and Pierre Laporte.
