= Montréal-Ouest (provincial electoral district) =

Quebec electoral district

Defunct provincial electoral district
- Legislature: National Assembly of Quebec
- District created: 1867
- District abolished: 1890
- First contested: 1867
- Last contested: 1886

Montréal-Ouest (French pronunciation: [mɔ̃ʁeal wɛst]) was a former provincial electoral district in the Montreal region of Quebec, Canada that elected members to the Legislative Assembly of Quebec.

It was created for the 1867 election. Its final election was in 1886. It disappeared in the 1890 election and its successor electoral districts were Montréal division no. 4 and Montréal division no. 5.

== Members of the Legislative Assembly ==
- Alexander Walker Ogilvie, Conservative (1867–1871)
- Francis Cassidy, Conservative (1871–1873)
- John Wait McGauvran, Conservative (1873–1878)
- James McShane, Liberal (1878–1886)
- John Smythe Hall, Conservative (1886–1890)
