= James John Edmund Guerin =

Canadian politician and physician (1856–1932)

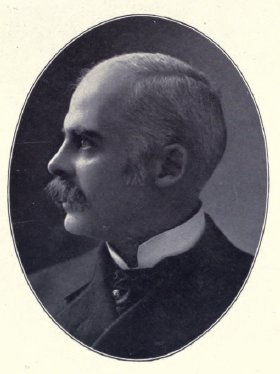

Member of the Canadian Parliament for St. Ann
- In office 29 October 1925 – 27 July 1930
- Preceded by: Joseph Charles Walsh
- Succeeded by: John Alexander Sullivan

30th Mayor of Montreal
- In office 1910–1912
- Preceded by: Louis Payette
- Succeeded by: Louis-Arsène Lavallée

Member of the Legislative Assembly of Quebec for Montréal division no. 6
- In office 1895–1904
- Preceded by: Patrick Kennedy
- Succeeded by: Michael James Walsh

Personal details
- Born: 4 July 1856 Montreal, Canada East, United Province of Canada
- Died: 10 November 1932 (aged 76) Montreal, Quebec, Canada
- Party: Liberal (federal); Liberal (provincial)
- Spouse: Mary O'Brien (m. 1883)
- Education: McGill University
- Profession: doctor

James John Edmund Guerin (4 July 1856 – 10 November 1932) was a Canadian physician and politician.

== Biography ==
Born in Montreal, Canada East, the son of Thomas Guerin and Mary McGuire, Guerin was educated at the Collège de Montréal and received a M.D. degree from McGill University in 1878. He was an attending physician and President of the Medical Board at the Hotel Dieu Hospital in Montreal. He was also a professor of Clinical Medicine at the location of Laval University then in Montreal.

He was elected to the Legislative Assembly of Quebec for the electoral district of Montréal division no. 6 in an 1895 by-election. A Liberal, he was re-elected in 1897 and 1900. He was a Minister without Portfolio in the cabinet of Félix-Gabriel Marchand and Simon-Napoléon Parent. He was defeated in 1904. In 1901 he was appointed a member of the Council of Public Instruction of the Province of Quebec. From 1910 to 1912, he was mayor of Montreal.

He was elected to the House of Commons of Canada for the electoral district of St. Ann in the 1925 federal election. A Liberal, he was re-elected in the 1926 election. He was defeated in the 1930 election. He was the first Grand Knight of the first Knights of Columbus council in Canada. After his death in 1932, he was entombed at the Notre Dame des Neiges Cemetery in Montreal.

The township municipality of Guérin, Quebec was named after him. His son, Thomas Guerin, was Liberal MLA for Montréal–Sainte-Anne from 1942 to 1948.

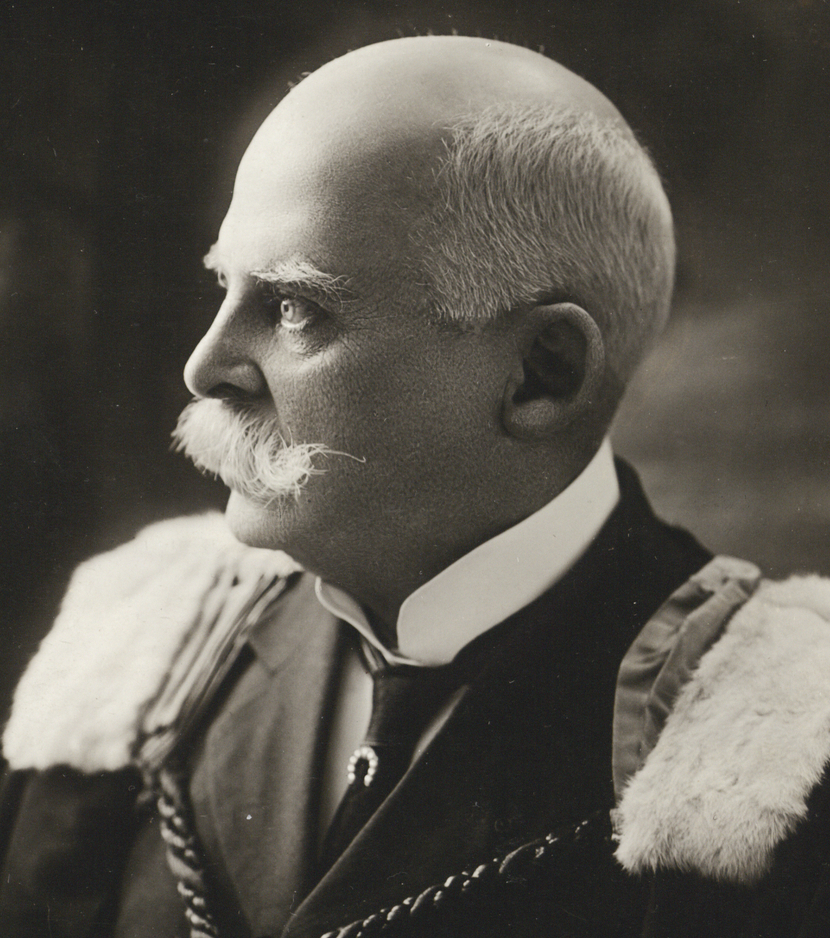
James J. Guerin, 1856-1932
