= Medical Council of Canada =

Canadian organization

- Conseil médical du Canada
- Formation: 1912
- Type: Non-profit organization
- Headquarters: Ottawa, Ontario, Canada
- Members: Physicians
- Official language: English and French
- Chief Executive Officer: Dr. Viren Naik
- Key people: Thomas George Roddick (founder)
- Website: www.mcc.ca

The Medical Council of Canada (MCC; French: Conseil médical du Canada, CMC) is a non-profit organization charged with the partial assessment and evaluation of medical graduates and physicians through standardized examination. It grants the qualification called Licentiate of the Medical Council of Canada (LMCC), which is a requirement to independently practice medicine in Canada.

The MCC is governed by the Council, composed of up to 12 Councillors, which provides oversight on the management of the activities and affairs of the Medical Council of Canada. There are annual meetings to discuss budgets, policies, and assets. Regular day-to-day operation is led by the CEO, currently Dr. Viren Naik.

== History ==
The MCC was founded in 1912 by the Canada Medical Act through the efforts of Sir Thomas Roddick, a physician and Member of Parliament, who had been pursuing a standardized medical licensing scheme in Canada for over 18 years.

Beginning April 1912, the MCC granted the right to practice throughout Canada and to be admitted to the British Medical Register (BMR) to serve in the medical forces of the army and navy. The practice for registering physicians into the BMR eventually ceased, but those who wish to practice in the UK could register themselves with the General Medical Council.

From January 1979 to November 2018, the Medical Council of Canada Evaluating Examination (MCCEE) was offered. A passing score on this examination used to be required for international medical graduates to attempt the Medical Council of Canada Qualifying Examination (MCCQE). As of 2019, all medical graduates, regardless of whether they graduate from a Canadian or international medical school, are eligible to write the MCCQE.

== Examinations ==
Exam	Candidates	Type of Assessment	Cost	Passing Score	Attempts Allowed	Where
Medical Council of Canada Qualifying Examination (MCCQE)	Medical students within 15 months of graduation and medical graduates	Computer-based test; 6.5-hour 230-question multiple-choice examination	$1,500	226 (scaled score from 100-400)	4, the exam cannot be retaken if you have previously passed	In over 80 countries at Prometric testing centres, up to 5 times per year
National Assessment Collaboration (NAC) Examination	International medical students or US osteopathic medical students within 12 months of graduation and international medical graduates (IMG) or graduates of US osteopathic medical schools and want to apply to a Canadian residency program	10 Objective Structured Clinical Examination (OSCE) stations	$3,320	1374 (scaled score from 1300-1500)	3, the exam can be retaken if you have previously passed	At testing centres across Canada in March and September
Therapeutics Decision-Making (TDM) Examination	International medical graduates who are seeking licensure and independent practice as family physicians in Canada.	Computer-based test	$2,850	484 (scaled score from 400-600)	4, the exam can be retaken if you have previously passed	Prometric testing centres around the world

A pass standing is required on the MCCQE in order to be awarded Licentiate of the Medical Council of Canada (LMCC). LMCC is recognized by medical licensing authorities in Canada, and is one of the requirements for the issuance of a licence to practice medicine in Canada. The USMLE examination is accepted as a substitute for the MCCQE examinations in British Columbia.

The Licentiate of the Medical Council of Canada (LMCC), currently awarded to resident physicians who pass MCCQE and have completed 12 months of postgraduate medical training, was originally established in 1912. Historically, the LMCC played an important role in medical licensing, as those who were awarded this designation were provided with a provincial license to practice medicine independently as a general practitioner (GP). However, since the early 1990s, provincial licensing bodies began requiring certification through the Royal College of Physicians and Surgeons of Canada or the College of Family Physicians of Canada before permitting physicians to practice independently.

Examination costs, which represent the MCCs main source of income, are increased on a yearly basis. Registrants are also exposed to withdrawal policies and cancellation fees.

=== Examination relevance and validity ===
The Medical Council of Canada Qualifying Examination (MCCQE) Part II has been criticized for nearly two decades for its relevance, validity, possible redundancy, and financial burden on resident physicians. As such, a number of physicians and resident physicians from across Canada have been advocating for its elimination as a requirement for full licensure to practice medicine independently in Canada.

According to Dr. Maureen Topps, Executive Director and CEO of the Medical Council of Canada (MCC), "MCC examinations were created to ensure that physicians across Canada meet common standards in order to provide safe and effective patient care." This is an important objective, and the MCC's efforts to standardize Canadian medical education in the early 20th century played a key role in the development of the consistently high quality of education provided by Canadian medical schools today. However, the MCC examinations are no longer the only tool available to evaluate medical learners. Canadian medical schools now universally utilize comprehensive written and clinical exams to test students prior to graduation. In addition, residency programs across Canada are transitioning towards a Competency-Based Medical Education (CBME) curriculum, based on a philosophy of longitudinal continuous assessment; years' worth of regular assessments over the course of a resident physician's training would arguably provide both a greater amount of and more accurate information about a resident physician's clinical performance than a one-time examination like the MCCQE Part II. Even prior to the implementation of CBME, it has been demonstrated that rotation evaluation reports and residency program director ratings are "significant predictors of pass-fail performance on the MCCQE Part II." Finally, resident physicians must pass rigorous written and clinical examinations organized by the Royal College of Physicians and Surgeons of Canada or the College of Family Physicians of Canada prior to being authorized to practice medicine independently in their chosen specialties. It is evident that the MCCQE Part II is a vestige of an earlier, less evolved medical education system, and it is now widely regarded as an outdated artifact. Given that the MCCQE Part II no longer confers resident physicians the ability to practice independently during residency, nor is it used by residency programs to evaluate the readiness of resident physicians to progress to their next postgraduate year, the exam no longer has any objective utility.

=== Examination costs and financial status ===
The May 2020 exam cost each applicant $2,980 ($2,780 exam fee with an additional $200 account fee). According to publicly available financial information on the MCC website, the organization was audited by Deloitte in 2019. These data reveal that the MCC's net revenue directly related to the MCCQE Part II that year was $6,871,458 (gross revenue $12,539,670; expenses $5,668,212). This significant profit margin contrasts starkly with the average debt of $164,000 of Canadian medical graduates. Resident physicians work an average of 70 hours per week, and up to over 100 hours per week, providing essential medical care to patients across Canada, for a modest salary out of proportion with their level of education and responsibility. Many are still pondering why Canada's resident physicians are shouldering the costs of an exam that continues to exist mainly as a means to generate substantial revenues for the MCC.

=== Response to the COVID-19 pandemic ===
While the MCC initially postponed in-person examinations taking place during the first wave of the COVID-19 pandemic, leaving graduating physicians with provisional licenses, administrators decided to proceed with future upcoming examinations during the pandemic's second wave in October 2020 and beyond. The MCCQE Part II examination is to be held in-person only, with no online alternative yet available, an arrangement which stands in stark contrast to the format of national OSCEs administered by the College of Family Physicians of Canada and the Royal College of Physicians and Surgeons of Canada, the other Canadian certifying bodies. Although basic respiratory etiquette was made mandatory during the examination, the MCC specified that it could not ensure the safety of all participants as physical distancing may not be possible in examination rooms. The MCC disregarded participants' concern for the risk of COVID-19 transmission during the examination and the implications for their communities. Following contact by resident physicians concerned by the significant public health risk posed by the upcoming MCCQE Part II examinations, local public health departments ordered site closures in several locations, including Kingston, Montreal, Toronto, and Quebec City. It was discovered that the MCC had registered participants requiring international and inter-provincial travel. Nearly a third of 90 candidates scheduled at the cancelled Kingston examination site originated not only from hot spots in Ontario but from the United States as well. Multiple Canadians studying medicine abroad were also forced to return to Canada amidst the COVID-19 pandemic in order to attend an in-person examination administered by the MCC. Public health and preventive medicine physicians indicate that the MCC's decisions are the least effective means of preventing exposures. In order to maximize prevention, examinations should be substituted or eliminated entirely. The MCC's lack of proactivity in planning a sound format for examinations to take place safely is strongly criticized.

Less than 48 hours ahead of exam time, the MCC cancelled the October 2020 MCCQE Part 2 across Canada. Secured communications were later sent to all those already registered for the upcoming February 2021 MCCQE Part 2, informing them that the examination was cancelled. With an ever-growing backlog of competent physicians, having passed their specialty examinations with the College of Family Physicians of Canada or the Royal College of Physicians and Surgeons of Canada, the MCC decided to fully refund candidates who withdrew their application to the MCCQE Part 2. This is in stark contrast with the MCC's usual significant "non-refundable" administrative fee, which was announced at $1,390 for the 2020 examinations. It was later announced that the preregistration period for the May 2021 MCCQE Part 2 was postponed to a later date to allow even more time for the MCC to organize virtual OSCEs.

=== Remotely proctored examinations ===
In order to deliver the MCCQE Part I, the MCC developed a remotely proctored version of the examination, allowing medical graduates to complete the examination in a safe location while being remotely supervised. The MCC has even issued a statement acknowledging the "unacceptable" experience some candidates experienced. The Canadian Federation of Medical Students heard over 180 student complaints regarding MCCQE Part 1 examination difficulties. These included difficulties booking the online examination, frequent disconnections on the day of the examination, no remote proctor seemingly present, and having to conduct one's own security check to show one was not cheating. On May 31, 2021 the MCC abruptly cancelled the online version of the MCCQE Part II.

== Licentiate ==
A physician who meets the following requirements is enrolled in the Canadian Medical Register as a Licentiate of the Medical Council of Canada (LMCC):

- Graduate from a medical school listed in the World Directory of Medical Schools
- Passed the Medical Council of Canada Qualifying Examination (MCCQE)

== National Registry of Physicians ==
Managed by the Medical Council of Canada (MCC) and funded in part by the Government of Canada, the National Registry of Physicians (NRP) is a centralized database of physician information in Canada. It consolidates licensing and credential data across all provincial and territorial medical regulatory authorities.
