= Paul Mercier (Liberal MP) =

Canadian politician

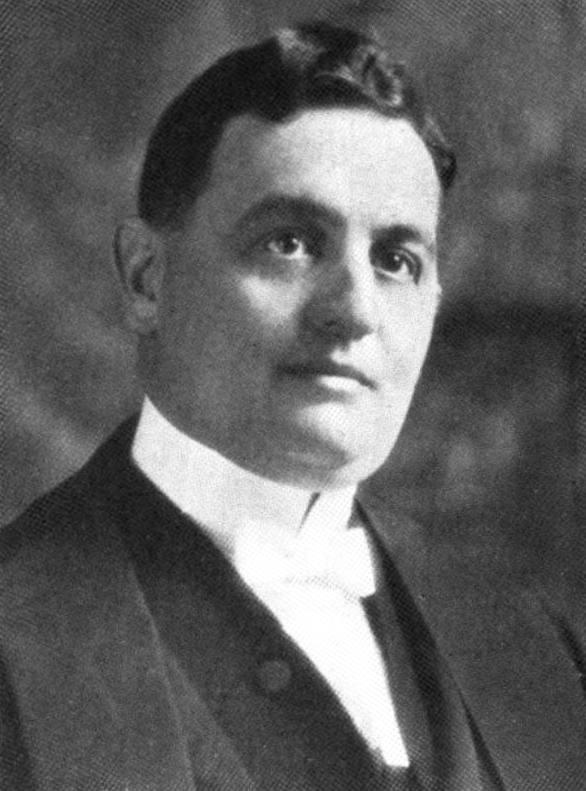

Member of Parliament for Westmount—St. Henri
- In office December 1921 – October 1925
- Succeeded by: riding dissolved

Member of Parliament for St. Henri/St. Henry
- In office October 1925 – November 1937
- Preceded by: riding created
- Succeeded by: Joseph-Arsène Bonnier

Personal details
- Born: 14 February 1888 Montreal, Quebec, Canada
- Died: 10 August 1943 (aged 55)
- Party: Liberal
- Spouse(s): Aline Dion m. 16 June 1913
- Profession: Lawyer

Paul Mercier (14 February 1888 – 10 August 1943) was a Liberal party member of the House of Commons of Canada. He was born in Montreal, Quebec and became a lawyer.

Mercier attended school at Montcalm, then Sainte-Therese College and Université Laval at Montreal. He was appointed as King's Counsel in 1922.

He was first elected to Parliament at the Westmount—St. Henri riding in the 1921 general election. After riding boundary changes in 1924, Mercier was re-elected at the new St. Henri electoral district in the 1925 federal election, then re-elected there in 1926, 1930 and 1935 (in 1933, the riding's English name became "St. Henry").

On 29 November 1937, Mercier accepted an appointment to become a Montreal region Circuit Court judge, leaving the House of Commons before completing his term in the 18th Canadian Parliament.
