= Francis Cassidy =

Canadian politician

Mayor Francis Cassidy
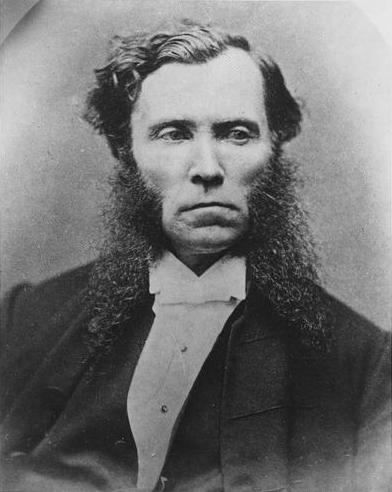

14th Mayor of Montreal
- In office February 1873 – June 1873
- Preceded by: Charles-Joseph Coursol
- Succeeded by: Aldis Bernard

Member of the Legislative Assembly of Quebec for Montréal-Ouest
- In office 1871–1873
- Preceded by: Alexander Walker Ogilvie
- Succeeded by: John Wait McGauvran

Personal details
- Born: 17 January 1827 Saint-Jacques-de-l’Achigan, Lower Canada
- Died: 14 June 1873 (aged 46) Montreal, Quebec
- Resting place: Notre Dame des Neiges Cemetery
- Profession: lawyer

Francis Cassidy, QC (17 January 1827 – 14 June 1873) was a Canadian lawyer and politician, the Mayor of Montreal, Quebec for three months in 1873, until his term was cut short by death.

Cassidy was born at Saint-Jacques-de-l’Achigan, in what is today Quebec's Montcalm Regional County Municipality, Quebec. Despite spending childhood in a poor family, he attended Collège de l'Assomption with the support of Abbé Étienne Normandin. He began legal studies in Montreal, formally becoming a lawyer on 18 August 1848. After developing a distinguished legal career, he was designated Queen's Counsel on 5 August 1863.

He was a founder of the Institut canadien de Montréal and served as its president between 1849 and 1850 and again between 1857 and 1858. From 1871 to 1873, he served as a Conservative member for Montréal-Ouest riding during the first portion of the 2nd Legislative Assembly of Quebec.

Just months after becoming Montreal's uncontested mayor in February 1873, Cassidy died in office that June. He was entombed at the Notre Dame des Neiges Cemetery in Montreal. He never married.
