= James McShane =

Canadian politician and businessman (1833–1918)

Mayor James McShane
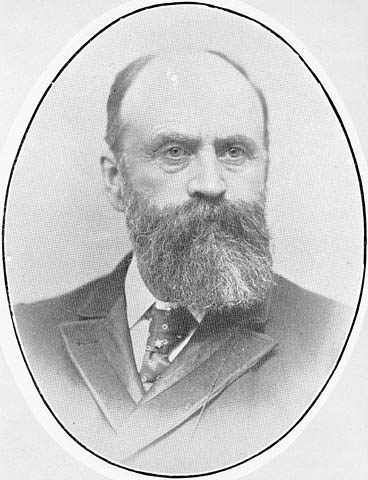

21st Mayor of Montreal
- In office 1891–1893
- Preceded by: Jacques Grenier
- Succeeded by: Alphonse Desjardins

Member of the Canadian Parliament for Montreal Centre
- In office 1895–1896
- Preceded by: John Joseph Curran
- Succeeded by: None, district abolished

Member of the Legislative Assembly of Quebec for Montréal division no. 6
- In office 1890–1892
- Preceded by: None, district created
- Succeeded by: Patrick Kennedy

Member of the Legislative Assembly of Quebec for Montréal-Centre
- In office 1886–1890
- Preceded by: George Washington Stephens
- Succeeded by: None, district abolished

Member of the Legislative Assembly of Quebec for Montréal-Ouest
- In office 1878–1886
- Preceded by: John Wait McGauvran
- Succeeded by: John Smythe Hall

Personal details
- Born: 7 November 1833 Montreal, Lower Canada
- Died: 14 December 1918 (aged 85) Montreal, Quebec, Canada
- Party: Liberal
- Other political affiliations: Quebec Liberal Party
- Profession: businessman
- Cabinet: Quebec: Commissioner of Agriculture and Public Works (1887-1888)

James McShane (7 November 1833 – 14 December 1918) was a Canadian businessman and politician. He was mayor of Montreal, a member of the Legislative Assembly of Quebec, and a member of the House of Commons of Canada.

== Background ==
Born in Montreal, the son of James McShane and Ellen Quinn, he worked as an exporter of livestock to England. He served as a volunteer in the militia during the Fenian raids in 1866.

== Montreal city politics ==
He represented the Sainte-Anne Ward on the Montreal City Council, from 1868 to 1873, 1874 to 1881 and from 1883 to 1887. From 1891 to 1893, he was the mayor of Montreal.

== Member of the Provincial Legislature ==
In 1873, he was defeated as the Liberal Party of Quebec candidate in a Quebec provincial by-election in the riding of Montréal-Ouest.

He was elected in the 1878 provincial election and re-elected in 1881. He was elected in Montréal-Centre in 1886, and in Montréal division no. 6 in 1890. From 1887 to 1888, he was commissioner of agriculture and public works in the cabinet of Premier Honoré Mercier. He was defeated in the 1892 provincial election.

== Federal politics ==
In 1895, he was elected to the Canadian House of Commons in a by-election in the riding of Montreal Centre. A Liberal, he was defeated in the 1896 federal election in the riding of St. Anne.

1896 Canadian federal election: St. Anne
Party	Candidate	Votes
Conservative	Michael Joseph Francis Quinn	3,071
Liberal	James McShane	2,952

By-election on 27 December 1895
Party	Candidate	Votes
Liberal	James McShane	acclaimed

== Retirement ==
After leaving politics, he was involved with the Montreal Harbour Commission and was harbour-master from 1900 to 1912. After his death in 1918, he was entombed at the Notre Dame des Neiges Cemetery in Montreal.

== Gallery ==
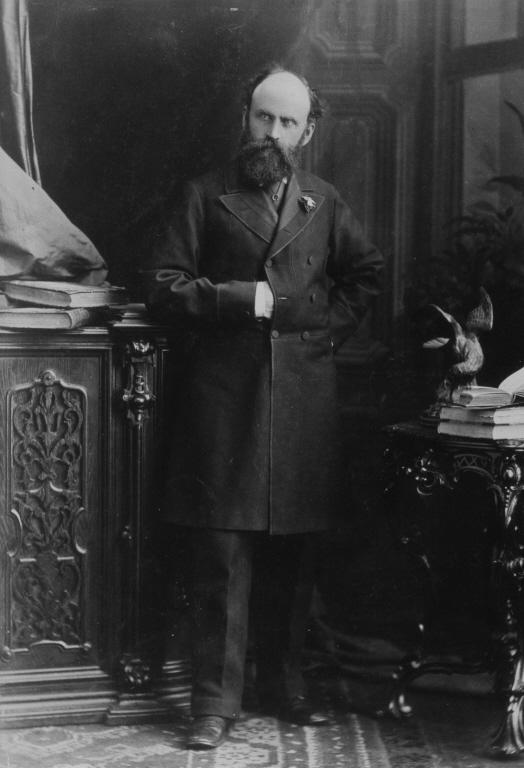
