= Herbert Ames =

Canadian politician

Sir Herbert Brown Ames
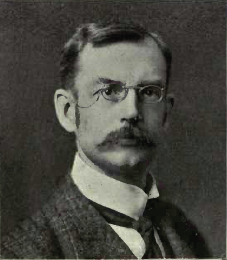

Member of the Canadian Parliament for St. Antoine
- In office 1904–1921
- Preceded by: Thomas George Roddick
- Succeeded by: Walter George Mitchell

Personal details
- Born: June 27, 1863 Montreal, Canada East
- Died: March 31, 1954 (aged 90) Montreal, Quebec
- Party: Conservative
- Spouse: Louisa Marion Kennedy

Sir Herbert Brown Ames (June 27, 1863 – March 31, 1954) was a Canadian businessman, philanthropist and politician.

Ames was born in Montreal as the only son of Evan Fisher Ames (who founded the shoe manufacturer Ames, Holden & Company in 1856) and Caroline Matilda Brown.

Ames inherited the family shoe company and later worked in insurance but used much of his fortune to help the poor and fight corruption. He received a Bachelor of Arts degree from Amherst College in 1885. He helped organize the Volunteer Electoral League and became alderman (City Councillor) in Montreal in 1898 and served until 1906. He became a Member of Parliament in 1904 as a member of the Conservative Party of Canada, and served until 1920. In 1919 he served as a financial director for the League of Nations. He is best known for his book The city below the hill: a sociological study of a portion of the city of Montreal, Canada, which originally appeared in the form of newspaper articles in the Montreal Star in 1897. The book offered a sociological and statistical analysis of the conditions of the poor people in just south of downtown Montreal, including Griffintown, Little Burgundy, and part of Pointe-Saint-Charles. Ames was an avid philanthropist and funded a 39 unit apartment housing complex on William Street between Shannon and Ann for the poor called Diamond Court (see image). It has since been demolished.

He died in Montreal in 1954 and is buried along with his wife in the North Head Cemetery located behind the Anglican Church on Grand Manan Island, New Brunswick.

The Herbert-Brown-Ames Park in Montreal is named in his honour.

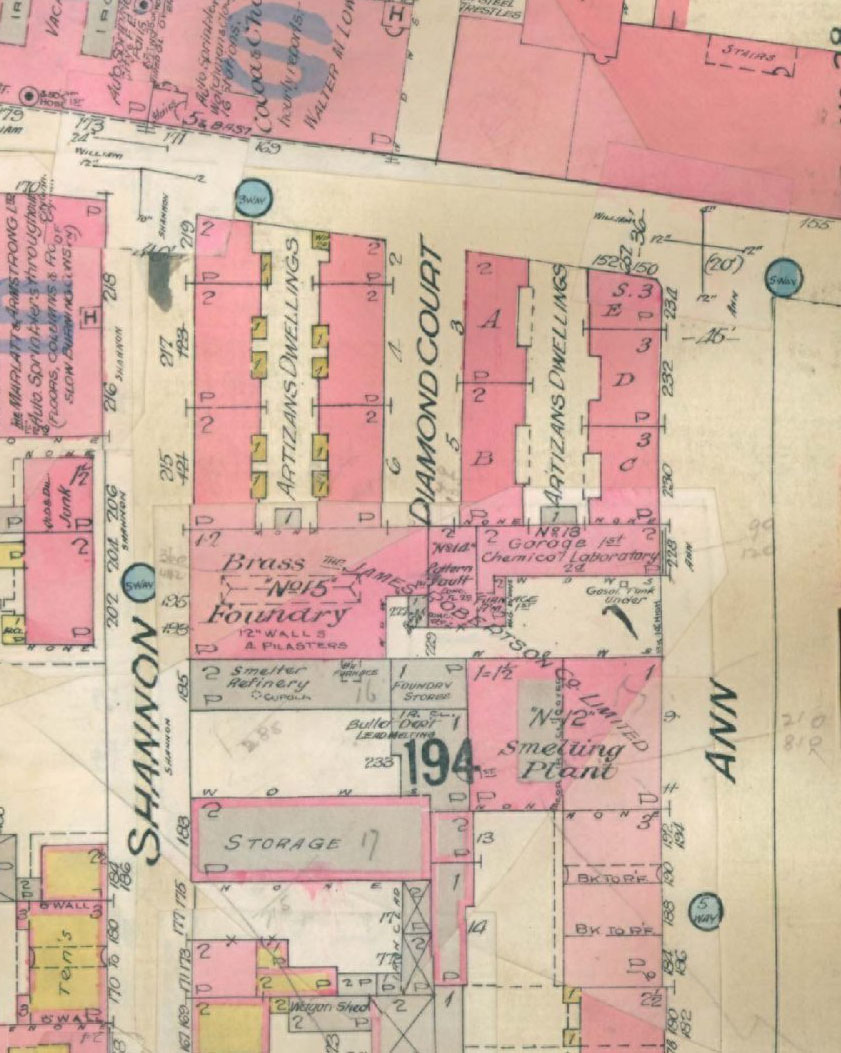
Diamond Court (circa 1909)
