= Thomas Healy (politician) =

Canadian politician

Member of Parliament for St. Ann
- In office March 1940 – April 1957

Personal details
- Born: Thomas Patrick Healy; 19 April 1894 Montreal, Quebec, Canada
- Died: 12 April 1957 (aged 62)
- Party: Liberal
- Spouse: Lucy McCarthy (m. 1930)
- Profession: contractor, manager

Thomas Patrick Healy (19 April 1894 – 12 April 1957) was a Liberal party member of the House of Commons of Canada. He was born in Montreal, Quebec and became a cartage contractor and manager, particularly of Healy Brothers Ltd.

Healy became a Montreal city alderman in a 1938 by-election. He was re-elected to city council in 1939, then acclaimed councillor in 1942, 1944, 1947 and 1950.

He was first elected to Parliament at the St. Ann riding in the 1940 general election and re-elected for successive terms in 1945, 1949 and 1953.
