= St. Henri (electoral district) =

Former federal electoral district in Quebec, Canada

Quebec electoral district

Defunct federal electoral district
- Legislature: House of Commons
- District created: 1924
- District abolished: 1987
- First contested: 1925
- Last contested: 1984

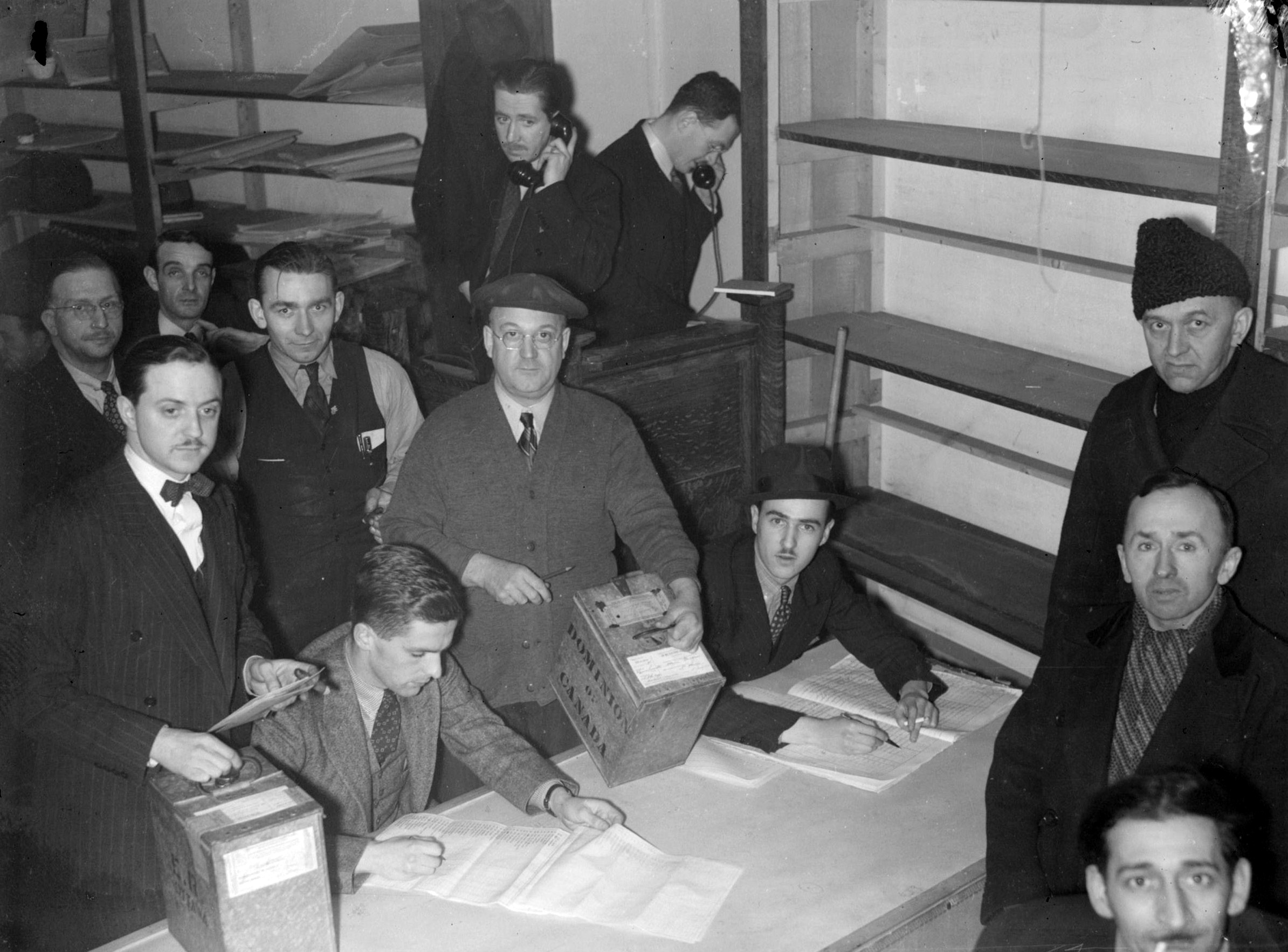
Counting the ballots in the 1938 by-election in the riding of St. Henri; Camillien Houde, running for the Conservatives, lost to Joseph Arsène Bonnier for the Liberals.

St. Henri (also known as St. Henry, St-Henri, Saint-Henri and Saint-Jacques) was a federal electoral district in Quebec, Canada, that was represented in the House of Commons of Canada from 1925 to 1988.

This riding was created in 1924 as "St. Henri" riding from parts of Westmount—St. Henri. In 1933, its English name was changed to "St. Henry". In 1947, "St. Henry" was abolished when it was redistributed into "St-Henri" and St. Antoine—Westmount ridings.

In 1952, "St-Henri" was abolished, and its territory transferred into a new riding named "Saint-Henri". In 1977, it was renamed Saint-Jacques.

Following the 2003 redistribution, the area of the old St-Henri riding became part of the riding of Jeanne-Le Ber.

== Members of Parliament ==
This riding elected the following members of Parliament:

Parliament	Years	Member	Party
St. Henri; Riding created from Westmount—St. Henri
15th	1925–1926	Paul Mercier	Liberal
16th	1926–1930	Paul Mercier	Liberal
17th	1930–1935	Paul Mercier	Liberal
St. Henry
18th	1935–1937	Paul Mercier	Liberal
18th	1938–1940	Joseph-Arsène Bonnier	Liberal
19th	1940–1945	Joseph-Arsène Bonnier	Liberal
20th	1945–1949	Joseph-Arsène Bonnier	Liberal
St-Henri
21st	1949–1953	Joseph-Arsène Bonnier	Liberal
Saint-Henri
22nd	1953–1957	Joseph-Arsène Bonnier	Liberal
23rd	1957–1958	Joseph-Arsène Bonnier	Liberal
24th	1958–1962	Hilarion-Pit Lessard	Liberal
25th	1962–1963	Hilarion-Pit Lessard	Liberal
26th	1963–1965	Hilarion-Pit Lessard	Liberal
27th	1965–1968	Hilarion-Pit Lessard	Liberal
28th	1968–1972	Gérard Loiselle	Liberal
29th	1972–1974	Gérard Loiselle	Liberal
30th	1974–1979	Gérard Loiselle	Liberal
Saint-Jacques
31st	1979–1980	Jacques Guilbault	Liberal
32nd	1980–1984	Jacques Guilbault	Liberal
33rd	1984–1988	Jacques Guilbault	Liberal
Riding dissolved into Laurier—Sainte-Marie, Saint-Henri—Westmount and Verdun—Saint-Paul

== Election results ==
=== St. Henri, 1925–1935 ===
1925 Canadian federal election
Party	Candidate	Votes
Liberal	Paul Mercier	11,829
Liberal Protectionist	Léopold Doyon	2,839

1926 Canadian federal election
Party	Candidate	Votes
Liberal	Paul Mercier	9,995
Independent Liberal	Joseph Mongeau	2,152

1930 Canadian federal election
Party	Candidate	Votes
Liberal	Paul Mercier	11,520
Conservative	Auguste Boyer	5,917

=== St. Henry, 1935–1949 ===
1935 Canadian federal election
Party	Candidate	Votes
Liberal	Paul Mercier	21,561
Conservative	Damase Saint-Maurice	4,871
Reconstruction	Amédée Jasmin	2,885

By-election on 17 January 1938 On Mercier's acceptance of an office of emolument under the Crown, 30 November 1937
Party	Candidate	Votes
Liberal	Joseph Arsène Bonnier	16,594
Conservative	Camillien Houde	11,931
Independent Liberal	Onil Léonide Gingras	346

1940 Canadian federal election
Party	Candidate	Votes
Liberal	Joseph Arsène Bonnier	17,531
Independent Liberal	Wilfrid-Eldège Lauriault	10,371
National Government	Édouard Lamontagne	2,081
Anti-Conscriptionist	Louis-Gérard Gosselin	642

1945 Canadian federal election
Party	Candidate	Votes
Liberal	Joseph Arsène Bonnier	19,137
Bloc populaire	Marcel Lafaille	8,601
Progressive Conservative	Édouard Lamontagne	1,902
Co-operative Commonwealth	René Chabot	941
Independent	Georges Taillefer	377
Social Credit	Paul-Elzéar Légaré	334
Independent	Conrad Bourdeau	322

=== St-Henri, 1949–1953 ===
1949 Canadian federal election
Party	Candidate	Votes
Liberal	Joseph Arsène Bonnier	16,313
Progressive Conservative	Germain Angrignon	7,369
Co-operative Commonwealth	Paul-Émile Jutras	909
Union des électeurs	Ferdinand Bouffard	500

=== Saint-Henri, 1953–1979 ===
1953 Canadian federal election
Party	Candidate	Votes
Liberal	Joseph Arsène Bonnier	15,046
Progressive Conservative	Germain Angrignon	4,659
Independent Liberal	Jacques Leblanc	2,992
Co-operative Commonwealth	Paul-Émile Jutras	538
Labor–Progressive	Pierre Gélinas	419

1957 Canadian federal election
Party	Candidate	Votes
Liberal	Joseph Arsène Bonnier	12,489
Independent Liberal	Rosaire Bouchard	9,207
Progressive Conservative	Maurice Boudrias	2,766
Co-operative Commonwealth	Paul-Émile Jutras	963

1958 Canadian federal election
Party	Candidate	Votes
Liberal	Hilarion-Pit Lessard	11,533
Progressive Conservative	Germain Angrignon	10,196
Independent Liberal	Rosaire Bouchard	4,393
Independent Liberal	Eugène-J.-E. Fournier	1,825
Social Credit	Lucien Bougie	714
Co-operative Commonwealth	Paul-Émile Jutras	691

1962 Canadian federal election
Party	Candidate	Votes
Liberal	Hilarion-Pit Lessard	13,323
Progressive Conservative	J.-Hormisdas Delisle	9,013
New Democratic	Armand Arsenault	2,200
Social Credit	Édouard Provencher	1,188
Independent	Ernest-Bill Boucher	646

1963 Canadian federal election
Party	Candidate	Votes
Liberal	Hilarion-Pit Lessard	13,981
Social Credit	Bruno Lépine	8,003
Progressive Conservative	Philippe Joannisse	2,800
New Democratic	Maurice Hébert	2,378

1965 Canadian federal election
Party	Candidate	Votes
Liberal	Hilarion-Pit Lessard	12,310
Progressive Conservative	Paul Barré	6,297
New Democratic	Richard Desjardins	3,364
Ralliement créditiste	Eugène Lépine	2,039
Communist	Jeannette Walsh	228

1968 Canadian federal election
Party	Candidate	Votes
Liberal	Gérard Loiselle	12,792
Independent	Pierre Sévigny	3,499
New Democratic	Gérard Philipps	1,491
Progressive Conservative	Pierre Hogue	972
Ralliement créditiste	Joseph Ranger	608
Independent Liberal	William Gaudreau	465
Independent	Lomer Pilote	335

1972 Canadian federal election
Party	Candidate	Votes
Liberal	Gérard Loiselle	7,191
Independent	Frank Hanley	5,743
Progressive Conservative	Eugène Fournier	2,802
Social Credit	Wilbrod Trépanier	2,082
New Democratic	Michel Gingras	1,161
Independent	Francine Bérubé	126

1974 Canadian federal election
Party	Candidate	Votes
Liberal	Gérard Loiselle	8,813
Progressive Conservative	Lucien Jarraud	6,147
New Democratic	Gus Callaghan	922
Social Credit	Jean-Paul Poulin	633
Independent	Louis Grégoire	306
Marxist–Leninist	Robert Perrault	119

=== Saint-Jacques, 1979–1988 ===
1979 Canadian federal election
Party	Candidate	Votes
Liberal	Jacques Guilbault	20,520
Progressive Conservative	Jean Chevrier	3,704
New Democratic	David-André Rowley	1,978
Social Credit	J. Alfred Lévesque	1,715
Rhinoceros	Balthazar Michel Deschamps	933
Libertarian	Robert Champlin	295
Communist	Claire Durand	189
Independent	Patricia Métivier	143
Marxist–Leninist	Auguste Arnold	104
Union populaire	Serge Rainville	84

1980 Canadian federal election
Party	Candidate	Votes
Liberal	Jacques Guilbault	17,757
Progressive Conservative	Jean Chevrier	3,038
New Democratic	Roger Monette	2,339
Rhinoceros	Rodrigue Tremblay	1,080
Independent	Raymonde Lebreux	224
Libertarian	Marc Krushelnyski	137
Union populaire	Hughette Godard	120
Marxist–Leninist	Arnold August	96
Communist	Daniel Pauquet	88
Independent	Patricia Métivier	55

1984 Canadian federal election
Party	Candidate	Votes
Liberal	Jacques Guilbault	10,875
Progressive Conservative	Lorraine Duguay	10,291
New Democratic	Mike Molter	4,057
Rhinoceros	Pierre Corbeil	1,204
Parti nationaliste	Denise Laroche	738
Communist	Marianne Roy	152
Commonwealth of Canada	Robert Langevin	116

== See also ==
- List of Canadian electoral districts
- Historical federal electoral districts of Canada
