= William John Loucks =

Canadian politician

Member of Parliament for Rosetown
- In office July 1930 – October 1935
- Preceded by: John Evans
- Succeeded by: riding dissolved

Personal details
- Born: 26 June 1873 Battersea, Ontario, Canada
- Died: 2 September 1968 (aged 95) Delisle, Saskatchewan, Canada
- Party: Conservative
- Spouse(s): Shannon m. 6 July 1898
- Profession: Farmer, President of the Delisle Telephone Company

William John Loucks (26 June 1873 – 2 September 1968) was a Conservative member of the House of Commons of Canada. He was born in Battersea, Ontario and became a farmer.

Loucks attended schools at Battersea and Kingston. For 15 years, he served as president of the Delisle Telephone Company.

He was elected to Parliament at the Rosetown riding in the 1930 general election. After serving a term in the 17th Canadian Parliament, Loucks was defeated by Major James Coldwell of the Co-operative Commonwealth Federation in the 1935 federal election, after riding boundaries were changed to replace the Rosetown riding with the new Rosetown—Biggar electoral district.
