= 26th Canadian Parliament =

1963–65 legislative term

- Minority parliament
- May. 16, 1963 – Sep. 8, 1965

Parliament leaders
- Prime minister: Lester B. Pearson; Apr. 22, 1963 – Apr. 20, 1968
- Cabinet: 19th Canadian Ministry
- Leader of the Opposition: John Diefenbaker; April 22, 1963 – September 8, 1967

Party caucuses
- Government: Liberal Party
- Opposition: Progressive Conservative Party
- Recognized: Social Credit Party
- New Democratic Party

House of Commons
- Seating arrangements of the House of Commons
- Speaker of the Commons: Alan Macnaughton; May 16, 1963 – January 17, 1966
- Government House leader: Jack Pickersgill; May 16, 1963 – December 21, 1963
- Guy Favreau; February 18, 1964 – October 30, 1964
- George McIlraith; October 30, 1964 – May 3, 1967
- Opposition House leader: Gordon Churchill; May 16, 1963 – April 22, 1965
- Michael Starr; April 22, 1965 – April 23, 1968
- Members: 265 MP seats List of members

Senate
- Speaker of the Senate: Maurice Bourget; April 27, 1963 – January 6, 1966
- Government Senate leader: William Ross Macdonald; April 22, 1963 – February 3, 1964
- John Joseph Connolly; February 3, 1964 – April 20, 1968
- Opposition Senate leader: Alfred Johnson Brooks; April 22, 1963 – October 31, 1967
- Senators: 102 senator seats List of senators

Sovereign
- Monarch: Elizabeth II; February 6, 1952 – September 8, 2022
- Governor general: Georges Vanier; 15 September 1959 – 5 March 1967

Sessions
- 1st session May 16, 1963 – December 21, 1963
- 2nd session February 18, 1964 – April 3, 1965
- 3rd session April 5, 1965 – September 8, 1965
← 25th	→ 27th

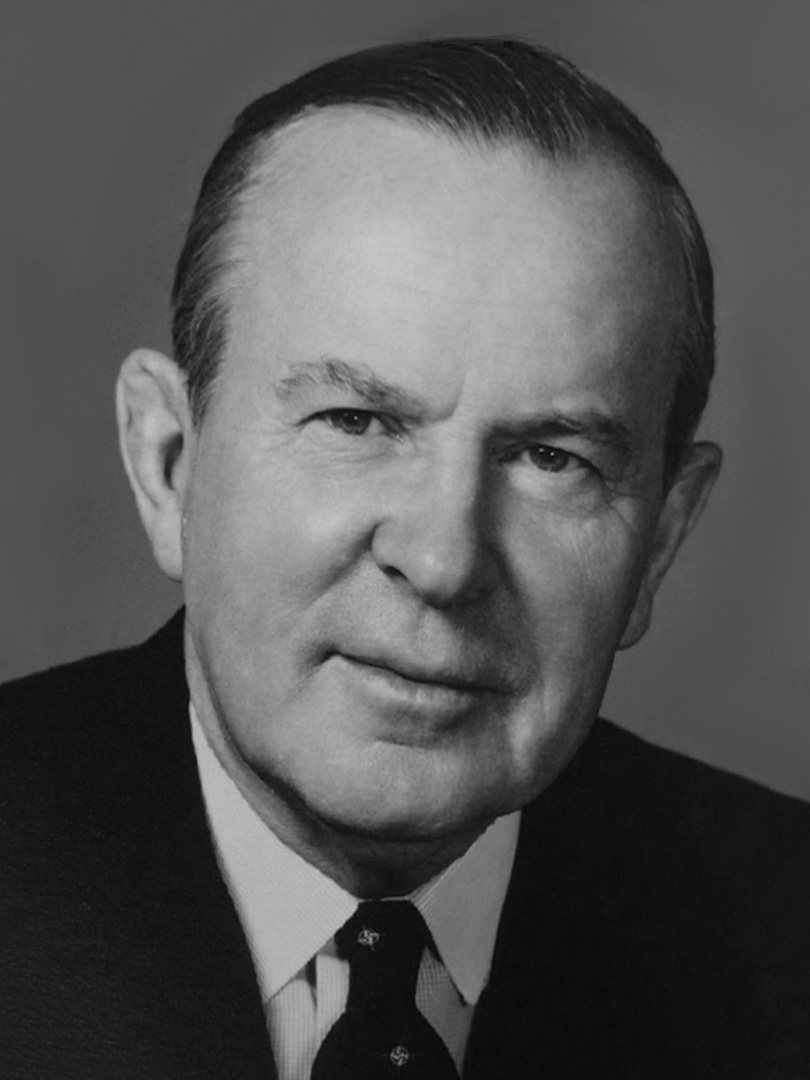
Lester B. Pearson (pictured here in 1963) was Prime Minister during the 26th Canadian Parliament.

The 26th Canadian Parliament was in session from May 16, 1963, until September 8, 1965. The membership was set by the 1963 federal election on April 8, 1963, and it changed only somewhat due to resignations and by-elections until it was dissolved prior to the 1965 election. Most of the MPs were elected as the single member for their district. Two represented Queen's (PEI) and two represented Halifax.

There were three sessions of the 26th Parliament:

Session	Start	End
1st	May 16, 1963	December 21, 1963
2nd	February 18, 1964	April 3, 1965
3rd	April 5, 1965	September 8, 1965

== Overview ==
The 26th Parliament was controlled by a Liberal Party minority under Prime Minister Lester B. Pearson and the 19th Canadian Ministry. The Official Opposition was the Progressive Conservative Party, led by John Diefenbaker.

The Speaker was Alan Macnaughton. See also List of Canadian electoral districts 1952-1966 for a list of the ridings in this parliament.

== Party standings ==
Number of members per party	Party leader	General Election
Number of members per party	Party leader	Apr. 8, 1963
Liberal	Lester Pearson	128
Progressive Conservative	John Diefenbaker	95
Social Credit	R.N. Thompson	24
Ralliement créditiste	Réal Caouette	
NDP	Tommy Douglas	17
Liberal-Labour		1
Total Seats		265

Note: Ralliement créditiste split off from the Social Credit party part of the way through the 26th Parliament and so was not active during the 1963 election.

== Major events ==
=== Royal Commission on Bilingualism and Biculturalism ===
Pearson's government established a Canadian royal commission on 19 July 1963 to "inquire into and report upon the existing state of bilingualism and biculturalism in Canada and to recommend what steps should be taken to develop the Canadian Confederation on the basis of an equal partnership between the two founding races, taking into account the contribution made by the other ethnic groups to the cultural enrichment of Canada and the measures that should be taken to safeguard that contribution".

The commission was jointly chaired by André Laurendeau, publisher of Le Devoir, and Davidson Dunton, president of Carleton University. As a result, it was sometimes known as the Laurendeau-Dunton commission. The Commission recommended sweeping changes when its final report was published, in five parts, 1967–1970, after a report of preliminary findings, February 1965. Among other things, it reported that Francophones were underrepresented in the nation's political and business communities. 1961 statistics of the salaries of Quebec men based on ethnic origin revealed that French Canadian incomes lagged behind all other ethnic groups, with the exception of Italian Canadians and aboriginal Canadians.

The recommendations included the following:

- That bilingual districts be created in regions of Canada where members of the minority community, either French or English, made up 10% or more of the local population.
- That parents be able to have their children attend schools in the language of their choice in regions where there is sufficient demand.
- That Ottawa become a bilingual city.
- That English and French be declared official languages of Canada.

=== Renaming of Air Canada ===
in 1964, Jean Chrétien submitted a private member's bill to change the name of the airline from Trans-Canada Airlines to Air Canada, which TCA had long used as its French-language name. This bill failed but it was later resubmitted and passed, with the name change taking effect on 1 January 1965.

=== Social insurance numbers ===
Social insurance numbers were created and issued in April 1964 by an order-in-council, to serve as a client account number in the administration of the Canada Pension Plan and Canada's varied employment insurance programs.

=== The Auto Pact ===
Pearson and Lyndon B. Johnson signed the Canada–United States Automotive Agreement (or Auto Pact) in January 1965, and unemployment fell to its lowest rate in over a decade.

=== Great Canadian flag debate ===
On June 15, 1964, Pearson opened a parliamentary discussion on establishing a unique flag for Canada to replace the Union Jack with the following resolution:

... to establish officially as the flag of Canada a flag embodying the emblem proclaimed by His Majesty King George V on November 21, 1921 — three maple leaves conjoined on one stem — in the colours red and white then designated for Canada, the red leaves occupying a field of white between vertical sections of blue on the edges of the flag.

The main opponent to a new flag was John Diefenbaker, leader of the opposition and former prime minister. He eventually made the subject a personal crusade, going so far as to mount a filibuster. A seemingly endless debate about the matter raged on in Parliament and the press with no side giving quarter. Pearson forced members of Parliament to stay through the summer of 1964, but the measure did not resolve the issue.

On September 10, 1964, Pearson formed a committee to resolve the ongoing debate. Out of three choices, the maple leaf design by Mount Allison University historian George Stanley, based on the flag of the Royal Military College of Canada, was selected. The flag officially appeared on February 15, 1965; the date is now celebrated annually as National Flag of Canada Day.

=== The Canadian Pension Plan ===
The Canadian Pension Plan was established by parliament in 1965. The bill was introduced by Pearson's minority government and was passed with the support of Tommy Douglas' New Democratic Party.

The Canadian Pension plan bill had its first reading on November 9, 1964, second reading on November 18, 1964, and was passed on its third reading on March 29, 1964. It was subsequently passed by the Senate on April 2, 1965, and receive Royal Ascent the following day.

=== White Paper on Defense ===
A white paper was tabled in the Parliament of Canada on 26 March 1964 by the Minister of National Defence, Paul Hellyer, and the Associate Minister of National Defence, Lucien Cardin. This document outlined a major restructuring of the three separate armed services, describing a reorganization that would include the integration of operations, logistics support, personnel, and administration of the separate branches under a functional command system. The proposal met with strong opposition from personnel in all three services, and resulted in the dismissal of the navy's senior operational commander, Rear Admiral William Landymore, as well as the forced retirements of other senior officers in the nation's military forces. The protests of service personnel and their superiors had no effect, however, and during the 27th Parliament, on 1 February 1968, Bill C-243, The Canadian Forces Reorganization Act, was granted royal assent, and the Royal Canadian Navy, the Canadian Army, and the Royal Canadian Air Force were combined into one service: the Canadian Armed Forces.

=== Peacekeeping Force in Cyprus ===
With Denmark, Ireland and Finland, Canada was one of the four original contributors of troops to UNFICYP, committed by the Pearson's government on 12 March 1964.

=== Canada Student Loans ===
On July 28, 1964, the Canada Student Loans Act was given royal assent, implementing a program of "guaranteed Canada Student Loans" which could be provided by financial institutions.

=== The beginnings of Medicare ===
Publicly funded healthcare had been a campaign promise of New Democratic Party leader Tommy Douglas during his run for premiere of Saskatchewan in 1960. The Saskatchewan NDP won a majority government and passed public healthcare legislation within the year. Douglas resigned from his position as premier to take up the leadership of the federal NDP, and his successor Woodrow Stanley Lloyd implement the healthcare program despite strong opposition from the province's doctors. These event's brought the public healthcare discussion to the national stage.

The Royal Commission on Health Services (often called the Hall Commission), which had been instigated by Diefenbaker's government on June 20, 1961, to investigate the medical needs of Canada, released its first report on June 19, 1964, and its second on December 7, 1964. These reports called for federal funding for a national healthcare plan. This aligned well with Pearson's campaign promise to implement a national healthcare plan during the 1963 election. The Pearson government would work toward implementing healthcare, passing the Medical Care Act, 1966 during the 27th Parliament with the support of the New Democratic Party, though the act did not come into effect until July 1, 1968.

== Ministry ==
The 19th Canadian Ministry began at the beginning of the 26th Canadian Parliament and lasted until near the end of the 27th Canadian Parliament.

== Officeholders ==
=== Head of State ===
position	Image	Name	From	To
Sovereign		Elizabeth II	February 6, 1952	September 8, 2022
Governor General		Georges Vanier	September 15, 1959	March 5, 1967

=== Party leadership ===
Party	Photo	Name	From	To
Liberal		Lester B. Pearson	January 16, 1958	April 6, 1968
Progressive Conservative		John Diefenbaker	April 22, 1963	September 8, 1967
Social Credit		R.N. Thompson	July 7, 1961	March 9, 1967
New Democratic		Tommy Douglas	August 3, 1961	April 24, 1971

=== House of Commons ===
==== Presiding officer ====
Office	Photo	Officer	Riding	From	To	Party
Speaker of the House of Commons		Alan Macnaughton	Mount Royal	May 16, 1963	January 17, 1966	Liberal

==== Government leadership (Liberal) ====
Office	Photo	Officer	Riding	From	To
Prime Minister		Lester B. Pearson	Algoma East	April 22, 1963	April 20, 1968
House Leader		Jack Pickersgill	Bonavista—Twillingate	May 16, 1963	December 21, 1963
House Leader		Guy Favreau	Papineau	February 18, 1964	October 30, 1964
House Leader		George McIlraith	Ottawa West	October 30, 1964	May 3, 1967
Whip		Alexis Caron	Hull	May 1963	October 1963
Whip		James Edgar Walker	York Centre	October 10, 1963	December 1, 1965

== Changes to party standings ==
=== Timeline ===
Number of members per party	General Election	Party Split	By-elections			Floor-crossing
Number of members per party	Apr. 8, 1963	Sep. 1, 1963	Feb. 10, 1964	Jun. 22, 1964	Nov. 9, 1964	Apr. 23, 1965
Liberal	128		N/A	N/A		
Progressive Conservative	95		N/A	N/A	▼1	▲2
Social Credit	24	▼13	N/A	N/A		▼2
Ralliement créditiste		▲13	N/A	N/A		
NDP	17		N/A	N/A	▲1	
Liberal-Labour	1		N/A	N/A		
Total Seats	265					

=== House of Commons ===
==== By-elections ====
By-election	Date	Incumbent	Party	Winner	Party	Cause	Retained
Westmorland	November 9, 1964	Sherwood Rideout	Liberal	Margaret Rideout	Liberal	Death	Yes
Waterloo South	November 9, 1964	Gordon Chaplin	Progressive Conservative	Max Saltsman	New Democratic	Death	No
Nipissing	June 22, 1964	Jack Garland	Liberal	Carl Legault	Liberal	Death	Yes
Saskatoon	June 22, 1964	Henry Frank Jones	Progressive Conservative	Eloise Jones	Progressive Conservative	Death	Yes
Laurier	February 10, 1964	Lionel Chevrier	Liberal	Fernand-E. Leblanc	Liberal	Resignation	Yes
Saint-Denis	February 10, 1964	Azellus Denis	Liberal	Marcel Prud'Homme	Liberal	Resignation	Yes

=== Party division ===
in 1963, 13 of Social Credit party's 20 Quebec MPs split off to form a new party named Ralliement des créditistes, later renamed to Ralliement créditiste in 1967. This left the Social Credit party with 11 total MPs.

Name	Electoral district	Original Party	New Party
Gérard Perron	Beauce	Social Credit	Ralliement Créditiste
Gérard Laprise	Chapleau	Social Credit	Ralliement Créditiste
Louis-Philippe-Antoine Bélanger	Charlevoix	Social Credit	Ralliement Créditiste
Henry Latulippe	Compton—Frontenac	Social Credit	Ralliement Créditiste
Pierre-André Boutin	Dorchester	Social Credit	Ralliement Créditiste
Charles-Eugène Dionne	Kamouraska	Social Credit	Ralliement Créditiste
Gilles Grégoire	Lapointe	Social Credit	Ralliement Créditiste
Raymond Langlois	Mégantic	Social Credit	Ralliement Créditiste
Jean Robert Beaulé	Quebec East	Social Credit	Ralliement Créditiste
Lucien Plourde	Quebec West	Social Credit	Ralliement Créditiste
Charles-Arthur Gauthier	Roberval	Social Credit	Ralliement Créditiste
Gilbert Rondeau	Shefford	Social Credit	Ralliement Créditiste
Réal Caouette	Villeneuve	Social Credit	Ralliement Créditiste

=== Floor-crossings ===
On April 23, 1964, two further Social Credit MPs left the party to sit as Progressive Conservatives. This left the Social Credit party with only 9 MPs.

Name	Electoral district	Original Party	New Party
Gérard Girouard	Labelle	Social Credit	Progressive Conservative
Gérard Ouellet	Rimouski	Social Credit	Progressive Conservative

== Parliamentarians ==
=== House of Commons ===
Following is a full list of members of the twenty-sixth Parliament listed first by province or territory, then by electoral district.

Key:

- Party leaders are italicized.
- Parliamentary secretaries is indicated by "‡".
- Cabinet ministers are in **boldface**.
- The Prime Minister is **both**.
- The Speaker is indicated by "(†)".

Electoral districts denoted by an asterisk (*) indicates that district was represented by two members.

==== Alberta ====
Electoral district	Name	Party	First elected/previously elected	No. of terms
Acadia	Jack Horner	Progressive Conservative	1958	3rd term
Athabaska	Jack Bigg	Progressive Conservative	1958	3rd term
Battle River—Camrose	Clifford Smallwood	Progressive Conservative	1958	3rd term
Bow River	Eldon Woolliams	Progressive Conservative	1958	3rd term
Calgary North	Douglas Harkness	Progressive Conservative	1945	7th term
Calgary South	**Harry Hays**	Liberal	1963	1st term
Edmonton East	William Skoreyko	Progressive Conservative	1958	3rd term
Edmonton—Strathcona	Terry Nugent	Progressive Conservative	1958	3rd term
Edmonton West	Marcel Lambert	Progressive Conservative	1957	4th term
Jasper—Edson	Hugh Horner	Progressive Conservative	1958	3rd term
Lethbridge	Deane Gundlock	Progressive Conservative	1958	3rd term
Macleod	Lawrence Kindt	Progressive Conservative	1958	3rd term
Medicine Hat	Bud Olson	Social Credit	1957, 1962	3rd term*
Peace River	Ged Baldwin	Progressive Conservative	1958	3rd term
Red Deer	Robert N. Thompson	Social Credit	1962	2nd term
Vegreville	Frank Fane	Progressive Conservative	1958	3rd term
Wetaskiwin	Harry Andrew Moore	Progressive Conservative	1962	2nd term

==== British Columbia ====
Electoral district	Name	Party	First elected/previously elected	No. of terms
Burnaby—Coquitlam	Tommy Douglas	New Democratic Party	1935, (Note: Weyburn (Saskatchewan)) 1962	4th term*
Burnaby—Richmond	Bob Prittie	New Democratic Party	1962	2nd term
Cariboo	Bert Leboe	Social Credit	1953, 1962	4th term*
Coast—Capilano	John (Jack) Davis ‡	Liberal	1962	2nd term
Comox—Alberni	Thomas Speakman Barnett	New Democratic Party	1953, 1962	4th term*
Esquimalt—Saanich	George Chatterton	Progressive Conservative	1961	3rd term
Fraser Valley	Alexander Bell Patterson	Social Credit	1953, 1962	4th term*
Kamloops	Charles Willoughby	Progressive Conservative	1963	1st term
Kootenay East	Jim Byrne ‡	Liberal	1949, 1962	5th term*
Kootenay West	Herbert Wilfred Herridge	New Democratic Party	1945	7th term
Nanaimo—Cowichan—The Islands	Colin Cameron	New Democratic Party	1953, 1962	4th term*
New Westminster	Barry Mather	New Democratic Party	1962	2nd term
Okanagan Boundary	David Vaughan Pugh	Progressive Conservative	1958	3rd term
Okanagan—Revelstoke	Stuart Fleming	Progressive Conservative	1958	3rd term
Skeena	Frank Howard	New Democratic Party	1957	4th term
Vancouver—Burrard	Ron Basford	Liberal	1963	1st term
Vancouver Centre	**John Robert (Jack) Nicholson**	Liberal	1962	2nd term
Vancouver East	Harold Winch	New Democratic Party	1953	5th term
Vancouver Kingsway	Arnold Webster	New Democratic Party	1962	2nd term
Vancouver Quadra	Grant Deachman	Liberal	1963	1st term
Vancouver South	**Arthur Laing**	Liberal	1949, 1962	3rd term*
Victoria	David Groos	Liberal	1963	1st term

==== Manitoba ====
Electoral district	Name	Party	First elected/previously elected	No. of terms
Brandon—Souris	Walter Dinsdale	Progressive Conservative	1951	6th term
Churchill	Robert Simpson	Progressive Conservative	1957	4th term
Dauphin	Elmer Forbes	Progressive Conservative	1958	3rd term
Lisgar	George Muir	Progressive Conservative	1957	4th term
Marquette	Nick Mandziuk	Progressive Conservative	1957	4th term
Portage—Neepawa	Siegfried Enns	Progressive Conservative	1962	2nd term
Provencher	Warner Jorgenson	Progressive Conservative	1957	4th term
Selkirk	Eric Stefanson Sr.	Progressive Conservative	1958	3rd term
Springfield	Joseph Slogan	Progressive Conservative	1958	3rd term
St. Boniface	**Roger Teillet**	Liberal	1962	2nd term
Winnipeg North	David Orlikow	New Democratic Party	1962	2nd term
Winnipeg North Centre	Stanley Knowles	New Democratic Party	1942, 1962	7th term*
Winnipeg South	Margaret Konantz	Liberal	1963	1st term
Winnipeg South Centre	Gordon Churchill	Progressive Conservative	1951	6th term

==== New Brunswick ====
Electoral district	Name	Party	First elected/previously elected	No. of terms
Charlotte	Allan M.A. McLean	Liberal	1962	2nd term
Gloucester	**Hédard Robichaud**	Liberal	1953	5th term
Kent	Guy Crossman	Liberal	1962	2nd term
Northumberland—Miramichi	George Roy McWilliam ‡	Liberal	1949	6th term
Restigouche—Madawaska	Jean-Eudes Dubé	Liberal	1962	2nd term
Royal	Gordon Fairweather	Progressive Conservative	1962	2nd term
St. John—Albert	Thomas Miller Bell	Progressive Conservative	1953	5th term
Victoria—Carleton	Hugh John Flemming	Progressive Conservative	1960	3rd term
Westmorland	Sherwood Rideout (died in office)	Liberal	1962	2nd term
Westmorland	Margaret Rideout (by-election of 1964-11-09)	Liberal	1964	1st term
York—Sunbury	John Chester MacRae	Progressive Conservative	1957	4th term

==== Newfoundland ====
Electoral district	Name	Party	First elected/previously elected	No. of terms
Bonavista—Twillingate	**Jack Pickersgill**	Liberal	1953	5th term
Burin—Burgeo	Chesley William Carter ‡	Liberal	1949	6th term
Grand Falls—White Bay—Labrador	Charles Granger	Liberal	1958	3rd term
Humber—St. George's	Herman Maxwell Batten	Liberal	1953	5th term
St. John's East	Joseph O'Keefe	Liberal	1963	1st term
St. John's West	Richard Cashin	Liberal	1962	2nd term
Trinity—Conception	James Roy Tucker	Liberal	1958	3rd term

==== Northwest Territories ====
Electoral district	Name	Party	First elected/previously elected	No. of terms
Northwest Territories	Eugène Rhéaume	Progressive Conservative	1963	1st term

==== Nova Scotia ====
Electoral district	Name	Party	First elected/previously elected	No. of terms
Antigonish—Guysborough	John Benjamin Stewart ‡	Liberal	1962	2nd term
Cape Breton North and Victoria	Robert Muir	Progressive Conservative	1957	4th term
Cape Breton South	Donald MacInnis	Progressive Conservative	1957, 1963	3rd term*
Colchester—Hants	Cyril Kennedy	Progressive Conservative	1957	4th term
Cumberland	Robert Coates	Progressive Conservative	1957	4th term
Digby—Annapolis—Kings	George Nowlan	Progressive Conservative	1948, 1950	7th term*
Digby—Annapolis—Kings	George Nowlan died on May 31, 1965	Vacant		
Halifax*	John Lloyd	Liberal	1963	1st term
Halifax*	Gerald Regan	Liberal	1963	1st term
Inverness—Richmond	**Allan MacEachen**	Liberal	1953, 1962	4th term*
Pictou	Russell MacEwan	Progressive Conservative	1957	4th term
Queens—Lunenburg	Lloyd Crouse	Progressive Conservative	1957	4th term
Shelburne—Yarmouth—Clare	Frederick Armstrong	Liberal	1963	1st term

==== Ontario ====
Electoral district	Name	Party	First elected/previously elected	No. of terms
Algoma East	**Lester B. Pearson**	Liberal	1948	7th term
Algoma West	George E. Nixon	Liberal	1940	8th term
Brantford	James Elisha Brown	Liberal	1953, 1962	3rd term*
Brant—Haldimand	**Lawrence Pennell** ‡	Liberal	1962	2nd term
Broadview	David Hahn ‡	Liberal	1963	1st term
Bruce	John Loney	Progressive Conservative	1963	1st term
Carleton	Cyril Lloyd Francis	Liberal	1963	1st term
Cochrane	Joseph-Anaclet Habel	Liberal	1953	5th term
Danforth	Reid Scott	New Democratic Party	1962	2nd term
Davenport	**Walter L. Gordon**	Liberal	1962	2nd term
Dufferin—Simcoe	Ellwood Madill	Progressive Conservative	1963	1st term
Durham	Russell Honey	Liberal	1962	2nd term
Eglinton	**Mitchell Sharp**	Liberal	1963	1st term
Elgin	James Alexander McBain	Progressive Conservative	1954	5th term
Essex East	**Paul Martin Sr.**	Liberal	1935	9th term
Essex South	Eugene Whelan	Liberal	1962	2nd term
Essex West	Herb Gray	Liberal	1962	2nd term
Fort William	Hubert Badanai ‡	Liberal	1958	3rd term
Glengarry—Prescott	Viateur Éthier	Liberal	1962	2nd term
Greenwood	Andrew Brewin	New Democratic Party	1962	2nd term
Grenville—Dundas	Jean Casselman Wadds	Progressive Conservative	1958	3rd term
Grey—Bruce	Eric Winkler	Progressive Conservative	1957	4th term
Grey North	Percy Verner Noble	Progressive Conservative	1957	4th term
Halton	Harry Harley	Liberal	1962	2nd term
Hamilton East	John Munro ‡	Liberal	1962	2nd term
Hamilton South	William Dean Howe	New Democratic Party	1963	1st term
Hamilton West	Joseph Macaluso	Liberal	1963	1st term
Hastings—Frontenac	Rod Webb	Progressive Conservative	1959	3rd term
Hastings South	Anthony Robert Temple	Liberal	1963	1st term
High Park	Pat Cameron	Liberal	1949, 1962	4th term*
Huron	Elston Cardiff	Progressive Conservative	1940	8th term
Kenora—Rainy River	**William Moore Benidickson**	Liberal-Labour	1945	7th term
Kent	Harold Danforth	Progressive Conservative	1958, 1963	2nd term*
Kingston	**Edgar Benson** ‡	Liberal	1962	2nd term
Lambton—Kent	Mac McCutcheon	Progressive Conservative	1963	1st term
Lambton West	Walter Frank Foy	Liberal	1962	2nd term
Lanark	George Doucett	Progressive Conservative	1957	4th term
Leeds	John Matheson	Liberal	1961	3rd term
Lincoln	James McNulty	Liberal	1962	2nd term
London	Jack Irvine	Progressive Conservative	1963	1st term
Middlesex East	Campbell Millar	Progressive Conservative	1962	2nd term
Middlesex West	William Howell Arthur Thomas	Progressive Conservative	1957	4th term
Niagara Falls	**Judy LaMarsh**	Liberal	1960	3rd term
Nickel Belt	Osias Godin	Liberal	1958	3rd term
Nipissing	**Jack Garland**	Liberal	1949	6th term
Nipissing	Carl Legault (by-election of 1964-06-22)	Liberal	1964	1st term
Norfolk	Jack Roxburgh	Liberal	1962	2nd term
Northumberland	Pauline Jewett	Liberal	1963	1st term
Ontario	Michael Starr	Progressive Conservative	1952	6th term
Ottawa East	Jean-Thomas Richard	Liberal	1945	7th term
Ottawa West	**George McIlraith**	Liberal	1940	8th term
Oxford	Wally Nesbitt	Progressive Conservative	1953	5th term
Parkdale	Stanley Haidasz ‡	Liberal	1957, (Note: Trinity) 1962	3rd term*
Parry Sound-Muskoka	Gordon Aiken	Progressive Conservative	1957	4th term
Peel	Bruce Beer	Liberal	1962	2nd term
Perth	J. Waldo Monteith	Progressive Conservative	1953	5th term
Peterborough	Fred Stenson	Progressive Conservative	1962	2nd term
Port Arthur	Doug Fisher	New Democratic Party	1957	4th term
Prince Edward—Lennox	Douglas Alkenbrack	Progressive Conservative	1962	2nd term
Renfrew North	James Forgie	Liberal	1953	5th term
Renfrew South	Joe Greene	Liberal	1963	1st term
Rosedale	Donald Stovel Macdonald ‡	Liberal	1962	2nd term
Russell	Paul Tardif	Liberal	1959	3rd term
Simcoe East	Philip Bernard Rynard	Progressive Conservative	1957	4th term
Simcoe North	Heber Smith	Progressive Conservative	1957	4th term
Spadina	Sylvester Perry Ryan	Liberal	1962	2nd term
Stormont	Lucien Lamoureux	Liberal	1962	2nd term
St. Paul's	Ian Wahn	Liberal	1962	2nd term
Sudbury	Rodger Mitchell	Liberal	1953	5th term
Timiskaming	Arnold Peters	New Democratic Party	1957	4th term
Timmins	Murdo Martin	New Democratic Party	1957	4th term
Trinity	**Paul Hellyer**	Liberal	1949, (Note: Davenport) 1958	5th term*
Victoria	Charles Lamb	Progressive Conservative	1963	1st term
Victoria	Charles Lamb died on July 12, 1965	Vacant		
Waterloo North	Oscar Weichel	Progressive Conservative	1958	3rd term
Waterloo South	Gordon Chaplin (died in office)	Progressive Conservative	1962	2nd term
Waterloo South	Max Saltsman (by-election of 1964-11-09)	New Democratic Party	1964	1st term
Welland	William Hector McMillan	Liberal	1950	6th term
Wellington—Huron	Marvin Howe	Progressive Conservative	1953	5th term
Wellington South	Alfred Hales	Progressive Conservative	1957	4th term
Wentworth	John B. Morison	Liberal	1963	1st term
York Centre	James Edgar Walker	Liberal	1962	2nd term
York East	Steven Otto	Liberal	1962	2nd term
York—Humber	Ralph Cowan	Liberal	1962	2nd term
York North	John Hollings Addison	Liberal	1962	2nd term
York—Scarborough	Maurice Moreau	Liberal	1963	1st term
York South	Marvin Gelber	Liberal	1963	1st term
York West	Red Kelly	Liberal	1962	2nd term

==== Prince Edward Island ====
Electoral district	Name	Party	First elected/previously elected	No. of terms
King's	John Mullally	Liberal	1963	1st term
Prince	**John Watson MacNaught**	Liberal	1945, 1963	4th term*
Queen's*	Angus MacLean	Progressive Conservative	1951	6th term
Queen's*	Heath MacQuarrie	Progressive Conservative	1957	4th term

==== Quebec ====
Electoral district	Name	Party	First elected/previously elected	No. of terms
Argenteuil—Deux-Montagnes	Vincent Drouin	Liberal	1962	2nd term
Beauce	Gérard Perron	Social Credit	1962	2nd term
Beauce	Gérard Perron	Ralliement Créditiste	1962	2nd term
Beauharnois—Salaberry	Gérald Laniel	Liberal	1962	2nd term
Bellechasse	Herman Laverdière	Liberal	1963	1st term
Berthier—Maskinongé—Delanaudière	Rémi Paul	Progressive Conservative	1958	3rd term
Berthier—Maskinongé—Delanaudière	Rémi Paul	Independent	1958	3rd term
Bonaventure	Albert Béchard	Liberal	1962	2nd term
Brome—Missisquoi	Heward Grafftey	Progressive Conservative	1958	3rd term
Cartier	Milton L. Klein	Liberal	1963	1st term
Chambly—Rouville	Bernard Pilon	Liberal	1962	2nd term
Champlain	Jean-Paul Matte	Liberal	1962	2nd term
Chapleau	Gérard Laprise	Social Credit	1962	2nd term
Chapleau	Gérard Laprise	Ralliement Créditiste	1962	2nd term
Charlevoix	Louis-Philippe-Antoine Bélanger	Social Credit	1962	2nd term
Charlevoix	Louis-Philippe-Antoine Bélanger	Ralliement Créditiste	1962	2nd term
Châteauguay—Huntingdon—Laprairie	Ian Watson	Liberal	1963	1st term
Chicoutimi	Maurice Côté	Social Credit	1962	2nd term
Chicoutimi	Maurice Côté	Ralliement Créditiste	1962	2nd term
Compton—Frontenac	Henry Latulippe	Social Credit	1962	2nd term
Compton—Frontenac	Henry Latulippe	Ralliement Créditiste	1962	2nd term
Dollard	Guy Rouleau ‡	Liberal	1953	5th term
Dorchester	Pierre-André Boutin	Social Credit	1962	2nd term
Dorchester	Pierre-André Boutin	Ralliement Créditiste	1962	2nd term
Drummond—Arthabaska	**Jean-Luc Pépin** ‡	Liberal	1963	1st term
Gaspé	Alexandre Cyr	Liberal	1963	1st term
Gatineau	Rodolphe Leduc	Liberal	1936, 1954	7th term*
Hochelaga	Raymond Eudes	Liberal	1940	8th term
Hull	Alexis Caron ‡	Liberal	1953	5th term
Îles-de-la-Madeleine	**Maurice Sauvé**	Liberal	1962	2nd term
Jacques-Cartier—Lasalle	Raymond Rock	Liberal	1962	2nd term
Joliette—l'Assomption—Montcalm	Louis-Joseph Pigeon	Progressive Conservative	1958	3rd term
Kamouraska	Charles-Eugène Dionne	Social Credit	1962	2nd term
Kamouraska	Charles-Eugène Dionne	Ralliement Créditiste	1962	2nd term
Labelle	Gérard Girouard	Social Credit	1963	1st term
Labelle	Gérard Girouard	Progressive Conservative	1963	1st term
Lac-Saint-Jean	Marcel Lessard	Social Credit	1962	2nd term
Lac-Saint-Jean	Marcel Lessard	Ralliement Créditiste	1962	2nd term
Lafontaine	Georges-C. Lachance	Liberal	1962	2nd term
Lapointe	Gilles Grégoire	Social Credit	1962	2nd term
Lapointe	Gilles Grégoire	Ralliement Créditiste	1962	2nd term
Laurier	**Lionel Chevrier** (resigned 27 December 1963)	Liberal	1935, (Note: Stormont (Ontario)) 1957	9th term*
Laurier	Fernand Leblanc (by-election of 1964-02-10)	Liberal	1964	1st term
Laval	Jean-Léo Rochon	Liberal	1962	2nd term
Lévis	Raynald Guay	Liberal	1963	1st term
Longueuil	Jean-Pierre Côté	Liberal	1963	1st term
Lotbinière	Auguste Choquette	Liberal	1963	1st term
Maisonneuve—Rosemont	**Jean-Paul Deschatelets**	Liberal	1953	5th term
Matapédia—Matane	**René Tremblay**	Liberal	1963	1st term
Mégantic	Raymond Langlois	Social Credit	1962	2nd term
Mégantic	Raymond Langlois	Ralliement Créditiste	1962	2nd term
Mercier	Prosper Boulanger	Liberal	1962	2nd term
Montmagny—L'Islet	Jean-Charles Richard Berger	Liberal	1963	1st term
Mount Royal	Alan Macnaughton (†)	Liberal	1949	6th term
Nicolet—Yamaska	Clément Vincent	Progressive Conservative	1962	2nd term
Notre-Dame-de-Grâce	Edmund Tobin Asselin	Liberal	1962	2nd term
Outremont—St-Jean	**Maurice Lamontagne**	Liberal	1963	1st term
Papineau	**Guy Favreau**	Liberal	1963	1st term
Pontiac—Témiscamingue	Paul Martineau	Progressive Conservative	1958	3rd term
Portneuf	Jean-Louis Frenette	Social Credit	1962	2nd term
Portneuf	Jean-Louis Frenette	Ralliement Créditiste	1962	2nd term
Québec—Montmorency	Guy Marcoux	Social Credit	1962	2nd term
Québec—Montmorency	Guy Marcoux	Ralliement Créditiste	1962	2nd term
Quebec East	Jean Robert Beaulé	Social Credit	1962	2nd term
Quebec East	Jean Robert Beaulé	Ralliement Créditiste	1962	2nd term
Quebec South	Jean-Charles Cantin ‡	Liberal	1962	2nd term
Quebec West	Lucien Plourde	Social Credit	1962	2nd term
Quebec West	Lucien Plourde	Ralliement Créditiste	1962	2nd term
Richelieu—Verchères	**Lucien Cardin**	Liberal	1952	6th term
Richmond—Wolfe	Patrick Tobin Asselin	Liberal	1963	1st term
Rimouski	Gérard Ouellet	Social Credit	1963	1st term
Rimouski	Gérard Ouellet	Progressive Conservative	1963	1st term
Rivière-du-Loup—Témiscouata	Rosaire Gendron	Liberal	1963	1st term
Roberval	Charles-Arthur Gauthier	Social Credit	1962	2nd term
Roberval	Charles-Arthur Gauthier	Ralliement Créditiste	1962	2nd term
Saguenay	Gustave Blouin	Liberal	1963	1st term
St. Ann	Gérard Loiselle	Liberal	1957	4th term
Saint-Antoine—Westmount	**Charles (Bud) Drury**	Liberal	1962	2nd term
Saint-Denis	**Azellus Denis** (resigned 27 December 1963)	Liberal	1935	9th term
Saint-Denis	Marcel Prud'homme (by-election of 1964-02-10)	Liberal	1964	1st term
Saint-Henri	H.-Pit Lessard	Liberal	1958	3rd term
Saint-Hyacinthe—Bagot	Théogène Ricard	Progressive Conservative	1957	4th term
Saint-Jacques	Maurice Rinfret	Liberal	1962	2nd term
Saint-Jean—Iberville—Napierville	**Yvon Dupuis** ‡	Liberal	1958	3rd term
St. Lawrence—St. George	John Turner ‡	Liberal	1962	2nd term
Sainte-Marie	Georges Valade	Progressive Conservative	1958	3rd term
Saint-Maurice—Laflèche	Jean Chrétien ‡	Liberal	1963	1st term
Shefford	Gilbert Rondeau	Social Credit	1962	2nd term
Shefford	Gilbert Rondeau	Ralliement Créditiste	1962	2nd term
Sherbrooke	Gérard Chapdelaine	Social Credit	1962	2nd term
Sherbrooke	Gérard Chapdelaine	Ralliement Créditiste	1962	2nd term
Stanstead	Yves Forest	Liberal	1963	1st term
Terrebonne	Léo Cadieux	Liberal	1962	2nd term
Trois-Rivières	Léon Balcer	Progressive Conservative	1949	6th term
Trois-Rivières	Léon Balcer	Independent	1949	6th term
Vaudreuil—Soulanges	René Émard	Liberal	1963	1st term
Verdun	Bryce Mackasey ‡	Liberal	1962	2nd term
Villeneuve	Réal Caouette	Social Credit	1946, (Note: Pontiac) 1962	3rd term*
Villeneuve	Réal Caouette	Ralliement Créditiste	1946, 1962	3rd term*

==== Saskatchewan ====
Electoral district	Name	Party	First elected/previously elected	No. of terms
Assiniboia	Lawrence Watson	Progressive Conservative	1963	1st term
Humboldt—Melfort—Tisdale	Reynold Rapp	Progressive Conservative	1958	3rd term
Kindersley	Reg Cantelon	Progressive Conservative	1963	1st term
Mackenzie	Stanley Korchinski	Progressive Conservative	1958	3rd term
Meadow Lake	Bert Cadieu	Progressive Conservative	1958	3rd term
Melville	James Ormiston	Progressive Conservative	1958	3rd term
Moose Jaw—Lake Centre	J. Ernest Pascoe	Progressive Conservative	1958	3rd term
Moose Mountain	Richard Southam	Progressive Conservative	1958	3rd term
Prince Albert	John Diefenbaker	Progressive Conservative	1940	8th term
Qu'Appelle	Alvin Hamilton	Progressive Conservative	1957	4th term
Regina City	Ken More	Progressive Conservative	1958	3rd term
Rosetown—Biggar	Clarence Owen Cooper	Progressive Conservative	1958	3rd term
Rosthern	Edward Nasserden	Progressive Conservative	1958	3rd term
Saskatoon	Henry Frank Jones (died 4 March 1964)	Progressive Conservative	1957	4th term
Saskatoon	Eloise Jones (by-election of 1964-06-22)	Progressive Conservative	1964	1st term
Swift Current—Maple Creek	Jack McIntosh	Progressive Conservative	1958	3rd term
The Battlefords	Albert Horner	Progressive Conservative	1958	3rd term
Yorkton	G. Drummond Clancy	Progressive Conservative	1958	3rd term

==== Yukon ====
Electoral district	Name	Party	First elected/previously elected	No. of terms
Yukon	Erik Nielsen	Progressive Conservative	1957	4th term

== Committees ==
=== House ===
Standing

- Standing Committee on Agriculture and Colonization
- Standing Committee on Banking and Commerce
- Standing Committee on Debates
- Standing Committee on External Affairs
- Standing Committee on Finance, Trade and Economic Affairs
- Standing Committee on Industrial Relations
- Standing Committee on Marine and Fisheries
- Standing Committee on Mines, Forests and Waters
- Standing Committee on Miscellaneous Private Bills
- Standing Committee on Privileges and Elections
- Standing Committee on Public Accounts
- Standing Committee on Railways, Canals and Telegraph Lines
- Standing Committee on Transport and Communications
- Standing Committee on Veterans Affairs

Special

- Special Committee on Defence
- Special Committee on Food and Drugs

Sessional

- Sessional Committee on Railways, Air Lines and Shipping Owned and Controlled by the Government

=== Senate ===
Standing

- Standing Committee on Banking and Commerce
- Standing Committee on External Relations
- Standing Committee on Finance
- Standing Committee on Miscellaneous Private Bills
- Standing Committee on Tourist Traffic
- Standing Committee on Transport and Communications

Special

- Special Committee on Aging
- Special Committee on Land Use in Canada

=== Joint ===
Standing

- None

Special

- Special Joint Committee on Canada Pension Plan
- Special Joint Committee on Consumer Credit

== Legislation and motions ==
=== Act's which received royal assent under 26th Parliament ===
==== 1st Session ====
===== Public acts =====
Date of Assent	Index	Title	Bill Number
Jun 5, 1963	1	Appropriation Act No. 1, 1963	C-69
July 22, 1963	2	Appropriation Act 1963 (SPECIAL)	C-86
July 22, 1963	3	Department of Industry Act	C-74
July 22, 1963	4	Export and Import Permits Act, an Act to amend the	S-3
July 31, 1963	5	Atlantic Development Board Act, an Act to amend the	C-80
July 31, 1963	6	Boucherville Islands Bridge and Tunnel Act	S-16
July 31, 1963	7	Customs Tariff, an Act to amend the	C-87
July 31, 1963	8	Judges Act and Criminal Code, an Act to amend the	C-92
August 2, 1963	9	Appropriation Act No. 2, 1963	C-94
August 2, 1963	10	Dissolution and Annulment of Marriages Act	C-93
August 2, 1963	11	Economic Council of Canada Act	C-72
August 2, 1963	12	Excise Tax Act, an Act to amend the	C-90
August 2, 1963	13	Municipal Development and Loan Act	C-76
August 2, 1963	14	Senate and House of Commons Act and the Members of Parliament Retiring Allowances Act, an Act to amend the	C-91
October 8, 1963	15	Appropriation Act No. 3, 1963	C-101
October 16, 1963	16	Old Age Security Act, an Act to amend the	C-98
October 18, 1963	17	Maritime Transportation Unions Trustees Act	C-102
November 7, 1963	18	Surcharge on Imports	C-88
December 5, 1963	19	Admiralty Act, an Act to amend the	C-108
December 5, 1963	20	Appropriation Act No. 4, 1963	C-116
December 5, 1963	21	Income Tax Act, an Act to amend the	C-95
December 5, 1963	22	Technical and Vocational Training Assistance Act, an Act to amend the	C-105
December 12, 1963	23	Auditors for National Railways, an Act respecting the appointment of	C-121
December 12, 1963	24	Canadian Overseas Telecommunication Corporation Act, an Act to amend the	C-112
December 12, 1963	25	Emergency Gold Mining Assistance Act, an Act to amend the	C-124
December 12, 1963	26	Old Age Assistance Act, the Disabled Persons Act and the Blind Persons Act, an Act to amend the	C-125
December 12, 1963	27	Quebec Savings Banks Act, an Act to amend the	S-46
December 12, 1963	28	Railway Act, an Act to amend the	C-110
December 12, 1963	29	St. Lawrence Seaway Authority Act, an Act to amend the	C-111
December 12, 1963	30	Small Businesses Loans Act, an Act to amend the	C-122
December 21, 1963	31	Canadian National Railways Financing and Guarantee Act, 1962–63	C -127
December 21, 1963	32	Canadian World Exhibition Corporation Act, an Act to amend the	C -120
December 21, 1963	33	Carriage by Air Act, an Act to amend the	S-37
December 21, 1963	34	Currency, Mint and Exchange Fund Act, an Act to amend the	C-106
December 21, 1963	35	Customs Tariff, an Act to amend the	C-129
December 21, 1963	36	National Centennial Act, an Act to amend the	C-107
December 21, 1963	37	National Harbours Board Act, an Act to amend the	S-39
December 21, 1963	38	Newfoundland Savings Bank Act, 1939, and Act to repeal the	S-4
December 21, 1963	39	Ontario Harbours Agreement Act	S-5
December 21, 1963	40	Representation Commissioner Act	C-126
December 21, 1963	41	Salaries of certain public officials-An Act to amend the Canada Grain Act, the Financial Administration Act, the Income Tax Act, the International Boundary Waters Treaty Act, the National Energy Board Act, the Railway Act, the Salaries Act and the Tariff Board Act, with respect to the	C-128
December 21, 1963	42	Main Supply Bill-Appropriation Act No. 5, 1963	C-132

===== Local and private acts =====
Date of Assent	Index	Title	Bill Number
July 22, July 31, August 2, December 5, December 21, 1963	43	Pointe-aux-Trembles, an Act ta authorize respecting the construction of a bridge and a causeway over the St. Lawrence River near the City of	S-41
July 22, July 31, August 2, December 5, December 21, 1963	44-60	Various Insurance company incorporation acts	Various
July 22, July 31, August 2, December 5, December 21, 1963	61-67	Incorporation of Various religious organizations	Various
July 22, July 31, August 2, December 5, December 21, 1963	68-74	Incorporation of various trust and loan corporations	Various
July 22, July 31, August 2, December 5, December 21, 1963	75	Canadian Manufacturers' Association, an Act respecting the	S-31
July 22, July 31, August 2, December 5, December 21, 1963	76	Metropolitan Toronto, an Act respecting The Board of Trade of	S-25
July 22, July 31, August 2, December 5, December 21, 1963	77	Pharmacy Examining Board of Canada, an Act to incorporate The	S-7
July 22, July 31, August 2, December 5, December 21, 1963	78	Ukrainian Canadian Foundation of Taras Shevchenko, an Act to incorporate	S-21
July 22, July 31, August 2, December 5, December 21, 1963	79	Ukrainian National Federation of Canada, an Act respecting	S-12

===== Divorce and Annulments =====
Date of Assent	Index	Title	Bill Number
August 2, October 8, December 21, 1963	80-582	Various divorce and annulment	Various

==== 2nd session ====
===== Public acts =====
Date of Assent	Index	Title	Bill Number
March 30, 1964	1	Appropriation Act No. 1, 1964	C-84
March 30, 1964	2	Trans-Canada Air Lines Act	C-2
April 3, 1964	3	Appropriation Act No. 3, 1964	C-87
April 6, 1964	4	Appropriation Act No. 2, 1964	C-86
April 13, 1964	5	Appropriation Act No. 4, 1964	C-89
May 21, 1964	6	Blue Water Bridge Authority Act	S-4
May 21, 1964	7	Customs Tariff, An Act to amend	C-92
May 21, 1964	8	Estate Tax Act, An Act to amend	C-94
May 28, 1964	9	Appropriation Act No. 5, 1964	C-99
June 18, 1964	10	Bank Act and the Quebec Savings Banks Act, An Act to amend	C-98
June 18, 1964	11	Crown Corporations (Provincial Taxes and Fees) Act	C-95
June 18, 1964	12	Farm Credit Act, An Act to amend	C-100
June 18, 1964	13	Income Tax Act, An Act to amend	C-91
June 18, 1964	14	Judges Act and Exchequer Court Act, An Act to amend	C-96
June 18, 1964	15	National Housing Act, 1954, An Act to amend	C-102
June 18, 1964	16	Ste-Foy-St-Nicolas Bridge Act	S-21
June 30, 1964	17	Appropriation Act No. 6, 1964	C-109
June 30, 1964	18	Export Credits Insurance Act, An Act to amend	C-90
June 30, 1964	19	Roosevelt Campobello International Park Commission Act	S-17
July 16, 1964	20	Appropriation Act No. 7, 1964	C-108
July 16, 1964	21	National Defence Act, An Act to amend	C-109
July 16, 1964	22	Territorial Sea and Fishing Zones Act	C-90
July 16, 1964	23	Youth Allowances Act	S-17
July 28, 1964	24	Canada Student Loans Act	C-110
August 7, 1964	25	Appropriation Act No. 8, 1964	C-116
August 13, 1964	26	Federal-Provincial Fiscal Revision Act, 1964	C-111
September 16, 1964	27	Farm Improvement Loans Act, An Act to amend	C-119
October 15, 1964	28	Crop Insurance Act, An Act to amend	C-129
October 15, 1964	29	Farm Machinery Syndicates Credit Act	C-121
November 5, 1964	30	Appropriation Act No. 9, 1964	C-135
November 20, 1964	31	Electoral Boundaries Readjustment Act	C-72
November 20, 1964	32	Harbour Commissions Act	S-10
November 20, 1964	33	Newfoundland Acts respecting Harbours and Pilotage repealed	S-40
December 2, 1964	34	Main Supply Bill-Appropriation Act No. 10, 1964	C-140
December 18, 1964	35	Combines Investigation Act and the Criminal Code, An Act to amend the	C-141
December 18, 1964	36	Judges Act, An Act to amend the	C-112
March 18, 1965	37	Canada-Japan Income Tax Convention Act	C-146
March 18, 1965	38	Canada Labour (Standards) Code	C-126
March 18, 1965	39	Canada Shipping Act, An Act to amend	S-7
March 18, 1965	40	Insurance, Department of, An Act to amend certain Acts administered in the	C-123
March 18, 1965	41	Canadian National Railways Financing and Guarantee Ac	C-137
March 18, 1965	42	Coal Production Assistance Act, An Act to amend	C-147
March 18, 1965	43	Corporations and Labour Unions Returns Act, An Act to amend	S-35
March 18, 1965	44	Geneva Conventions Act, 1949, An Act respecting	S-25
March 18, 1965	45	Merchant Seamen Compensation Act, An Act to amend	C-131
March 18, 1965	46	Penitentiary Act, An Act to amend	C-145
March 18, 1965	47	Privileges and Immunities (United Nations) Act, An Act to amend	S-24
March 18, 1965	48	Revised Statutes of Canada, An Act respecting	S-2
April 3, 1965	49	Appropriation Act No. 1, (Interim), 1965	C-150
April 3, 1965	50	Appropriation Act No. 2, (Supplementary), 1965	C-151
April 3, 1965	51	Canada Pension Plan	C-136
April 3, 1965	52	Companies Act, An Act to amend	S-22
April 3, 1965	53	Crîminal Code. (Habeas Corpus), An Act to amend	C-35
April 3, 1965	54	Established Programs (Interim Arrangements) Act	C-142

===== Local and private acts =====
Date of Assent	Index	Title	Bill Number
May 21, June 18, June 30, July 28, September 16, 1964	55	Burrard Inlet Tunnel and Bridge Company, An Act respecting The	S-47
May 21, June 18, June 30, July 28, September 16, 1964	56-62	Various Insurance company incorporation acts	
May 21, June 18, June 30, July 28, September 16, 1964	63-65	Various Insurance company incorporation acts	
May 21, June 18, June 30, July 28, September 16, 1964	66-68	Incorporation of Various religious organizations	
May 21, June 18, June 30, July 28, September 16, 1964	69	Bell Telephone Company of Canada. An Act respecting The	S-27
May 21, June 18, June 30, July 28, September 16, 1964	70-74	Incorporation of various trust and loan corporations	
May 21, June 18, June 30, July 28, September 16, 1964	75	Association of Universities and Colleges of Canada, An Act to incorporate	S-36
May 21, June 18, June 30, July 28, September 16, 1964	76	Canadian Institute of Actuaries, An Act to incorporate	S-45
May 21, June 18, June 30, July 28, September 16, 1964	77	General Council of the Canadian Branch of the St. John Ambulance Association, An Act respecting The	S-5
May 21, June 18, June 30, July 28, September 16, 1964	78	Montreal Board of Trade, An Act respecting The	S-18
May 21, June 18, June 30, July 28, September 16, 1964	79	Quebec Board of Trade, An Act respecting The	S-28
May 21, June 18, June 30, July 28, September 16, 1964	80	Royal College of Dentists of Canada, An Act to incorporate The	S-44

==== 3rd session ====
===== Public acts =====
Date of Assent	Index	Title	Bill Number
June 2, 1965	1	Appropriation Act No. 3, 1965	C-110
June 2, 1965	2	Excise Tax Act, An Act to amend An Act to amend the	C-96
June 2, 1965	3	National Housing Act, 1954, An Act to amend	C-104
June 2, 1965	4	Retirement of members of the Senate, An Act to make provision for the	C-98
June 2, 1965	5	Superannuation of persons employed in the Public Service, members of the Canadian Forces and members of the Royal Canadian Mounted Police	C-97
June 23, 1965	6	Appropriation Act No. 4, 1965	C-122
June 23, 1965	7	Bank Act and the Quebec Savings Banks Act, An Act to amend	C-116
June 23, 1965	8	Central Mortgage and Housing Corporation Act, An Act to amend	S-8
June 23, 1965	9	Fisheries Improvement Loans Act, An Act to amend	C-121
June 30, 1965	10	Appropriation Act No. 5, 1965	C-130
June 30, 1965	11	Appropriation Act No. 6, 1965	C-131
June 30, 1965	12	Area Development Incentives Act	C-129
June 30, 1965	13	Army Benevolent Fund Act, An Act to amend the	C-126
June 30, 1965	14	Canadian National Railways (Branch Lînes), Froomfield Spur near Sarnia to the property of Canadian Industries Limited in Sombra Township in the County of Lambton	C-124
June 30, 1965	15	Children of War Dead (Education Assistance) Act, An Act to amend the	C-125
June 30, 1965	16	Customs Act, An Act to amend	C-119
June 30, 1965	17	Customs Tariff, An Act to amend	C-120
June 30, 1965	18	Income Tax Act and the Federal-Provincial Fiscal Arrangements Act, An Act to amend	C-118
June 30, 1965	19	Veterans' Land Act, An Act to amend	C-128
June 30, 1965	20	War Veterans Allowance Act, 1952, An Act to amend	C-127

===== Local and private acts =====
Date of Assent	Index	Title	Bill Number
June 30, 1965	21	Principal Life Insurance Company of Canada, An Act to incorporate	S-9
June 30, 1965	22	Algoma Central and Hudson Bay Railway Company, An Act respecting The	S-4
June 30, 1965	23	Great Northern Railway Company and Great Northern Pacific & Burlington Lines Inc., An Act respecting	S-5
June 30, 1965	24	Canadian Institute of Mining and Metallurgy, An Act respecting The	S-12
