= David Hahn (disambiguation) =

David Hahn, or "Radioactive Boy Scout", (1976-2016) attempted to build a homemade breeder nuclear reactor in 1994, at age 17.

David Hahn may also refer to:

- David Hahn (Canadian politician) (1925–2012), Canadian member of Parliament
- David Hahn (American politician) (born 1955), 2006 Democratic candidate for Governor of Nebraska
- David Hahn (cartoonist) (born 1967), American comic book artist
- David Hahn, CEO of BC Ferries
- Dave Hahn, mountain guide, journalist and lecturer
