= Results of the 1965 Canadian federal election =

1965 Canadian federal election

== Results by Province and Territory ==
=== Alberta ===
Results in Alberta
Party	Seats	Second	Third	Fourth	Fifth	Votes	%	+/-
Progressive Conservative	15	2	0	0	0	247,734	46.62	
Social Credit	2	8	7	0	0	119,586	22.5	
Liberals	0	7	8	2	0	119,016	22.4	
NDP	0	0	2	15	0	43,818	8.25	
Communist	0	0	0	0	2	782	0.15	
Independent	0	0	0	0	1	493	0.09	
Total	17					531,429	100.0	

=== British Columbia ===
Results in British Columbia
Party	Seats	Second	Third	Fourth	Fifth	Votes	%	+/-
NDP	9	8	2	3	0	239,132	32.94	
Liberals	7	10	4	1	0	217,726	29.99	
Progressive Conservative	3	4	5	10	0	139,226	19.18	
Social Credit	3	0	11	8	0	126,532	17.43	
Communist	0	0	0	0	4	1,716	0.24	
Independent	0	0	0	0	2	1,150	0.16	
Progressive Workers Movement	0	0	0	0	1	274	0.04	
Independent Social Credit	0	0	0	0	1	228	0.03	
Total	22					725,984	100.0	

=== Manitoba ===
Results in Manitoba
Party	Seats	Second	Third	Fourth	Fifth	Votes	%	+/-
Progressive Conservative	10	3	1	0	0	154,253	40.65	
Liberals	1	11	2	0	0	117,442	30.95	
NDP	3	0	9	2	0	91,193	24.03	
Social Credit	0	0	2	9	0	16,315	4.3	
Independent	0	0	0	0	1	237	0.06	
Total	14					379,440	100.0	

=== New Brunswick ===
Results in New Brunswick
Party	Seats	Second	Third	Fourth	Votes	%	+/-
Liberals	6	4	0	0	114,781	47.49	
Progressive Conservative	4	6	0	0	102,714	42.5	
NDP	0	0	8	2	22,759	9.42	
Ralliement créditiste	0	0	1	0	1,081	0.45	
Social Credit	0	0	1	0	352	0.15	
Total	10				241,687	100.0	

=== Newfoundland and Labrador ===
Results in Newfoundland and Labrador
Party	Seats	Second	Third	Fourth	Votes	%	+/-
Liberals	7	0	0	0	94,291	64.12	
Progressive Conservative	0	7	0	0	47,638	32.4	
Social Credit	0	0	2	2	2,352	1.6	
NDP	0	0	2	1	1,742	1.18	
Independent Liberal	0	0	1	0	1,022	0.7	
Total	7				147,045	100.0	

=== Northwest Territories ===
Results in Northwest Territories
Party	Seats	Second	Third	Votes	%	+/-
Liberals	1	0	0	5,194	56.21	
Progressive Conservative	0	1	0	3,615	39.12	
NDP	0	0	1	431	4.66	
Total	1			9,240	100.0	

=== Nova Scotia ===
Results in Nova Scotia
Party	Seats	Second	Third	Fourth	Fifth	Sixth	Votes	%	+/-
Progressive Conservative	10	2	0	0	0	0	203,123	48.61	
Liberals	2	9	1	0	0	0	175,415	41.98	
NDP	0	0	10	1	1	0	38,043	9.1	
Independent	0	0	0	1	0	1	1,249	0.3	
Total	12						417,830	100.0	

=== Ontario ===
Results in Ontario
Party	Seats	Second	Third	Fourth	Fifth	Votes	%	+/-
Liberals	51	32	2	0	0	1,196,308	43.6	
Progressive Conservative	25	43	17	0	0	933,753	34.03	
NDP	9	10	63	2	0	594,112	21.65	
Social Credit	0	0	0	17	2	9,791	0.36	
Independent	0	0	1	5	1	5,391	0.2	
Ralliement créditiste	0	0	1	0	0	1,204	0.04	
Communist	0	0	0	2	1	1,038	0.04	
New Capitalist Party	0	0	0	3	0	1,009	0.04	
Independent Progressive Conservative	0	0	0	1	0	657	0.02	
Independent Conservative	0	0	0	1	0	373	0.01	
Socialist Labour	0	0	0	1	0	147	0.01	
Total	85					2,743,783	100.0	

=== Prince Edward Island ===
Results in Prince Edward Island
Party	Seats	Second	Third	Fourth	Fifth	Votes	%	+/-
Progressive Conservative	4	0	0	0	0	38,566	53.89	
Liberals	0	3	1	0	0	31,532	44.06	
NDP	0	0	2	1	1	1,463	2.04	
Total	4					71,561	100.0	

=== Quebec ===
Results in Quebec
Party	Seats	Second	Third	Fourth	Fifth	Sixth	Seventh	Votes	%	+/-
Liberals	56	19	0	0	0	0	0	928,530	45.58	
Progressive Conservative	8	30	27	7	2	1	0	433,101	21.26	
Ralliement créditiste	9	15	22	27	2	0	0	356,973	17.52	
NDP	0	11	22	33	4	1	0	244,239	11.99	
Independent	1	0	2	4	3	1	0	43,635	2.14	
Independent Liberal	0	0	2	1	5	1	0	15,716	0.77	
Independent Progressive Conservative	1	0	0	0	2	0	0	12,541	0.62	
Ouvrier indépendant	0	0	0	0	2	0	0	650	0.03	
Rhinoceros	0	0	0	0	0	1	1	618	0.03	
Communist	0	0	0	0	2	0	0	570	0.03	
Droit vital personnel	0	0	0	0	1	0	0	465	0.02	
Independent Social Credit	0	0	0	0	1	0	0	194	0.01	
Total	75							2,037,232	100.0	

=== Saskatchewan ===
Results in Saskatchewan
Party	Seats	Second	Third	Fourth	Fifth	Votes	%	+/-
Progressive Conservative	17	0	0	0	0	193,254	48.03	
NDP	0	8	9	0	0	104,626	26.01	
Liberals	0	9	8	0	0	96,740	24.05	
Social Credit	0	0	0	12	0	7,526	1.87	
Communist	0	0	0	0	1	179	0.04	
Total	17					402,325	100.0	

=== Yukon ===
Results in Yukon
Party	Seats	Second	Votes	%	+/-
Progressive Conservative	1	0	3,136	55.19	
Liberals	0	1	2,546	44.81	
Total	1		5,682	100.0	
