= Clarence Owen Cooper =

Canadian politician

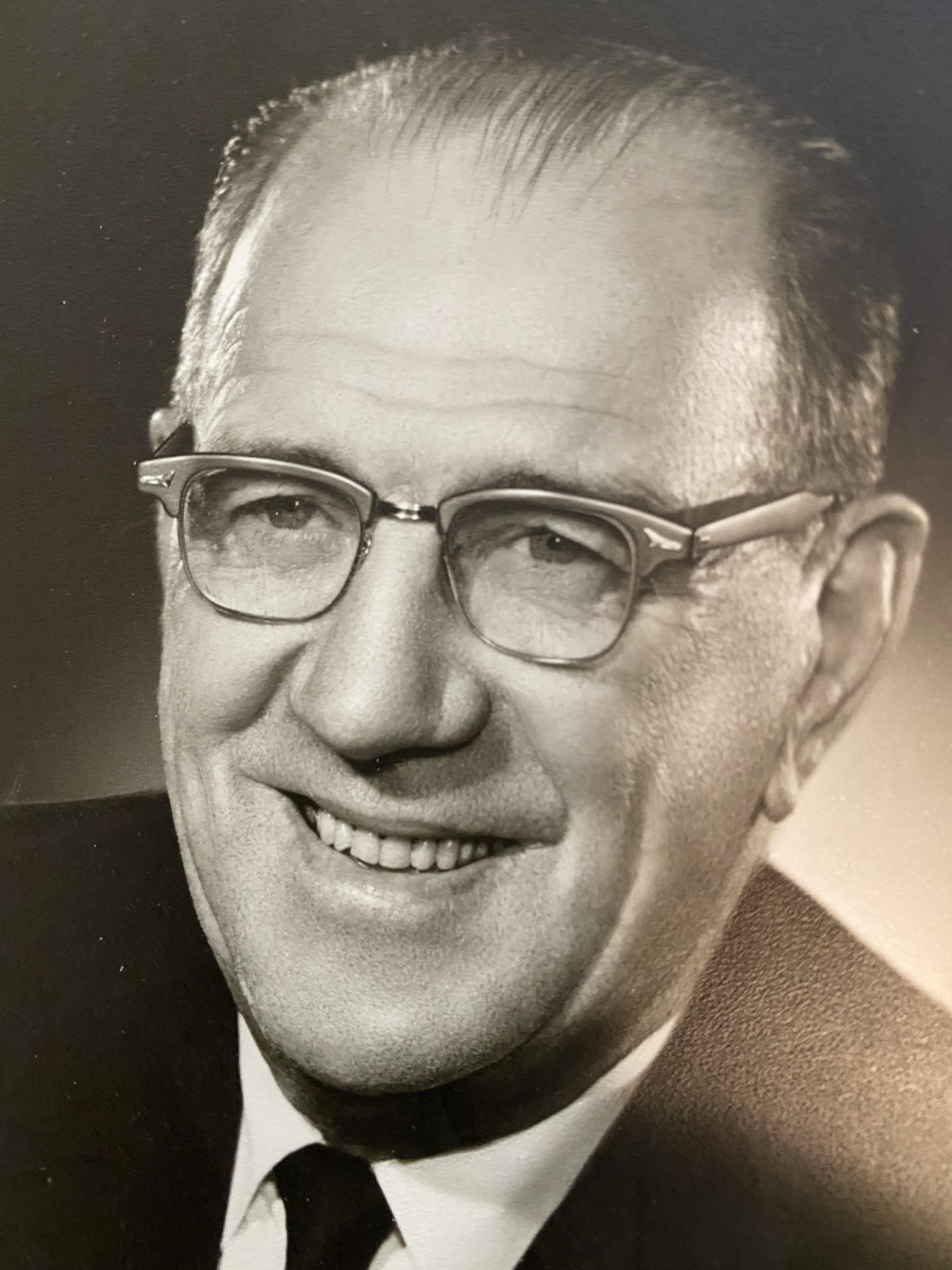

Member of Parliament for Rosetown—Biggar
- In office 31 March 1958 – 7 November 1965
- Preceded by: M. J. Coldwell
- Succeeded by: Ronald McLelland

Personal details
- Born: 17 October 1899 Meaford, Ontario, Canada
- Died: 5 April 1966 (aged 66)
- Party: Progressive Conservative
- Spouse: Lelia Potter
- Profession: Farmer

Clarence Owen "Tim" Cooper (17 October 1899 – 5 April 1966) was a Progressive Conservative party member of the House of Commons of Canada. He was born in Meaford, Ontario and became a farmer by career.

He was first elected at the Rosetown—Biggar riding in the 1958 general election, then re-elected there in 1962 and 1963. After completing his third and final term in 1965, the 26th Canadian Parliament, Cooper left federal office due to ill health and did not seek further re-election.
