= Eloise Jones =

Eloise Jones may refer to:

- Eloise Jones (footballer) (born 1999), Australian rules footballer
- Eloise Jones (politician) (born 1917), Canadian politician
