= John Evans (Saskatchewan politician) =

Canadian politician (1867–1958)

Member of Parliament for Saskatoon
- In office December 1921 – October 1925
- Preceded by: James Robert Wilson
- Succeeded by: Alexander MacGillivray Young

Member of Parliament for Rosetown
- In office October 1925 – May 1930
- Preceded by: riding created
- Succeeded by: William John Loucks

Personal details
- Born: 25 June 1867 Rhayader, Radnorshire, Wales
- Died: 5 January 1958 (aged 90) Saskatoon, Saskatchewan
- Party: Progressive
- Spouse(s): Lilian Page m. 4 March 1889
- Profession: farmer

John Evans (25 June 1867 – 5 January 1958) was a Progressive party member of the House of Commons of Canada. He was born in Rhayader, Radnorshire, Wales, the son of John Evans and Mary Wylde, moved to Canada in 1890 and became a farmer.

Evans attended school at Rhayader and Gaufron. He served as a public school principal at Teignmouth, England. Evans was also a Life Governor of the British and Foreign Bible Society.

He was first elected to Parliament in the Saskatoon riding in the 1921 general election. After serving one term there, he moved to the Rosetown riding, where he was re-elected in 1925 and 1926. After two terms in Rosetown, Evans was defeated by William John Loucks of the Liberals in the 1930 federal election. Evans made another attempt to return to Parliament in the 1935 election, this time running under the Co-operative Commonwealth Federation, but was unsuccessful in that campaign in the Saskatoon City riding.
