= Communist Party of Canada candidates in the 1974 Canadian federal election =

The Communist Party of Canada fielded several candidates in the 1974 federal election, none of whom were elected. Information about these candidates may be found on this page. Candidates who ran for the party in by-elections between 1974 and 1979 are also included.

== Thomas Lianos (Broadview, 16 October 1978 by-election) ==
Lianos was a thirty-five-year-old electrician and trade unionist. He received 204 votes (1.02%), finishing fourth against New Democratic Party candidate Bob Rae.
