= Rosetown–Biggar =

Rosetown-Biggar or Rosetown–Biggar may refer to:

- Rosetown—Biggar (federal electoral district), a federal electoral district in Saskatchewan, Canada
- Rosetown–Biggar (provincial electoral district), a provincial electoral district in Saskatchewan, Canada
