= Alexander MacGillivray Young =

Canadian politician (1878–1939)

Member of Parliament for Saskatoon City
- In office October 14, 1935 – July 9, 1939
- Preceded by: New riding
- Succeeded by: Walter George Brown

Member of Parliament for Saskatoon
- In office 1925–1930
- Preceded by: John Evans
- Succeeded by: Frank MacMillan

Personal details
- Born: July 30, 1878 Millsville, Nova Scotia
- Died: July 9, 1939 (aged 60) Saskatoon, Saskatchewan
- Party: Liberal
- Spouse: Alyce Maud (m. 1906–1939)
- Children: 3
- Education: McGill University
- Profession: physician

Alexander MacGillivray Young (July 30, 1878 – July 9, 1939) was a Canadian physician and politician. He was elected to the House of Commons of Canada as a Member of the Liberal Party for the riding of Saskatoon in 1925 and re-elected in 1926 and defeated in 1930. He was re-elected in 1935 to the riding of Saskatoon City and served as MP until his death.

Born in Millsville, Nova Scotia, Young was elected councillor for Saskatoon, Saskatchewan in 1913 and elected mayor of Saskatoon in 1916 and 1920. During the 16th Parliament of Canada, 1st Session, he was the Chairperson of the Select Standing Committee on Railways, Canals and Telegraph Lines. He is buried at Woodlawn Cemetery. Young Crescent in Saskatoon's Avalon community is named in his honour.

He was educated at Pictou Academy Dalhousie University and McGIll University receiving BA, MD and CM degrees. He married Alyce Maud on November 17, 1906. He was on the board of the Canadian Club in 1918. He was a member of the Medical Council of Canada from 1912 to 1937 and was its president in 1925 and 1926. He was a member of the Canadian Medical Association and was the registrar of the College of Physicians and Surgeons for several years until 1936. He died on 9 July 1939 in Saskatoon and is buried in Woodlawn Cemetery. He died of a brain tumor at City Hospital in Saskatoon. His wife, Alyce, died in Saskatoon on 30 September 1955 and is also buried in Woodlawn Cemetery.

In 2014 the Alexander MacGillivray Young park was opened in Stonebridge subdivision adjoining Chief Whitecap school.
