= David Hahn (Canadian politician) =

Canadian politician

David George Hahn

Member of Parliament for Broadview
- In office April 1963 – September 1965
- Preceded by: George Hees
- Succeeded by: John Gilbert

Parliamentary Secretary to the Minister of Industry
- In office July 1965 – September 1965

Personal details
- Born: 15 May 1925 Toronto, Ontario, Canada
- Died: 8 December 2012 (aged 87) Collingwood, Ontario, Canada
- Party: Liberal
- Profession: businessman

Military service
- Allegiance: Canada
- Branch/service: Canadian Army
- Years of service: 1943–1945
- Rank: Lieutenant

David George Hahn (15 May 1925 – 8 December 2012) was a Liberal party member of the House of Commons of Canada. He was a businessman by career.

He was first elected at the Broadview riding in the 1963 general election, after an unsuccessful attempt in 1962. After one term in the 26th Canadian Parliament, he was defeated in the 1965 election by John Gilbert of the New Democratic Party.

Hahn served as Parliamentary Secretary to the Minister of Industry from July to September 1965. He died in Collingwood in 2012.

== Electoral record ==
1965 Canadian federal election: Broadview
Party	Candidate	Votes
New Democratic	John Gilbert	8,232
Liberal	David Hahn	6,876
Progressive Conservative	Richard H. Lyall	5,481
Socialist Labor	William B. Hendry	147

1963 Canadian federal election: Broadview
Party	Candidate	Votes
Liberal	David Hahn	8,743
Progressive Conservative	Glen Day	6,684
New Democratic	John Gilbert	5,574
Social Credit	Tom Comerford	166
Independent	Fred Graham	149
Socialist Labor	Alan Sanderson	43

1962 Canadian federal election
Party	Candidate	Votes
Progressive Conservative	George Hees	8,929
Liberal	David Hahn	7,658
New Democratic	Gerry Gallagher	5,330
