= Frank MacMillan =

Canadian politician

Mayor of Saskatoon
- In office 1919–1920
- Preceded by: Alexander MacGillivray Young
- Succeeded by: Alexander MacGillivray Young

Member of the Canada Parliament for Saskatoon
- In office 1930–1935
- Preceded by: Alexander MacGillivray Young
- Succeeded by: Riding abolished

Personal details
- Born: May 15, 1882; Chicago, Illinois, U.S.
- Died: April 7, 1948 (aged 65); Vancouver, British Columbia, Canada
- Cause of death: Heart attack
- Political party: Conservative

Frank Roland MacMillan (May 15, 1882 – April 7, 1948) was a prominent businessman and politician in Saskatoon in central Saskatchewan, Canada.

He was born in Chicago, Illinois, and moved to Toronto with his family at the age of three. He married in Toronto and moved to Saskatoon, where he worked for John Macdonald & Co. for seven years before starting his own menswear business in 1908 in partnership with C. D. Mitcher. He purchased the Currie Bros. store in 1911, renaming it the MacMillan Department Store and in 1913 opened moved it to the new MacMillan Building was opened at 21st Street and Third Avenue. MacMillan sold his business to Eaton's in 1927.

MacMillan was elected to Saskatoon city council as an alderman in 1913 and became Mayor of Saskatoon in 1919.

A Conservative, he ran for the Saskatoon federal seat in the House of Commons of Canada in the 1925 and 1926 federal elections without success before winning a seat in the 1930 federal election that also elected a Tory government under R.B. Bennett. As an MP, MacMillan served on the House of Commons' Railway Committee and was instrumental in persuading the federal government to contribute to the construction of the 19th Street and Broadway Bridge as relief projects during the Great Depression as well as the C. P. Bridge at Borden. He did not run in the 1935 federal election.

MacMillan died of a heart attack in a Vancouver, British Columbia, hotel on April 7, 1948.

Parliament of Canada
Preceded by Alexander MacGillivray Young	Member of Parliament for Saskatoon; 1930–1935	Riding abolished
