= 1949 Canadian federal election =

- June 27, 1949

262 seats in the House of Commons 132 seats needed for a majority
- Opinion polls
- Turnout: 73.8% (▼1.5 pp)
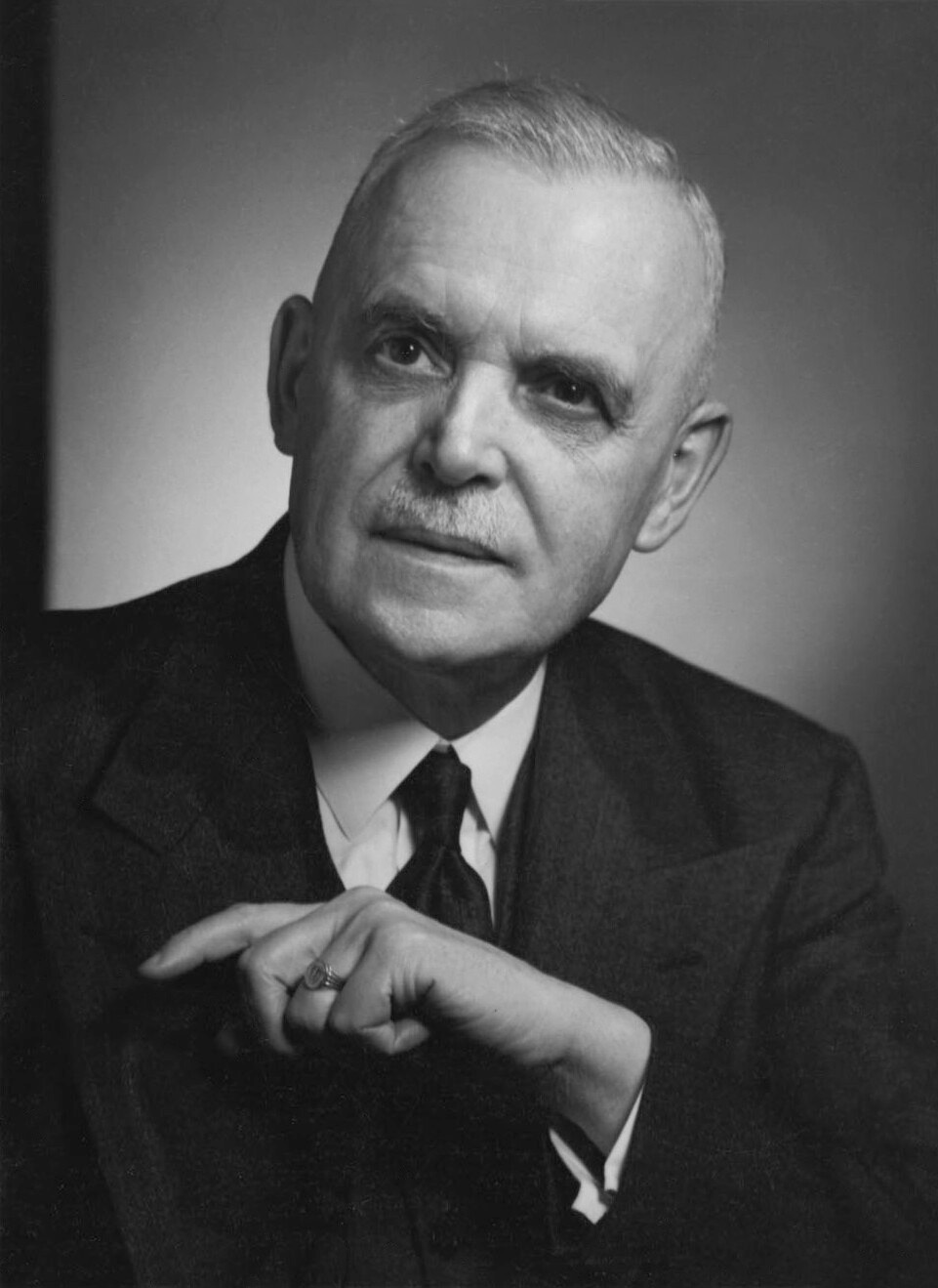

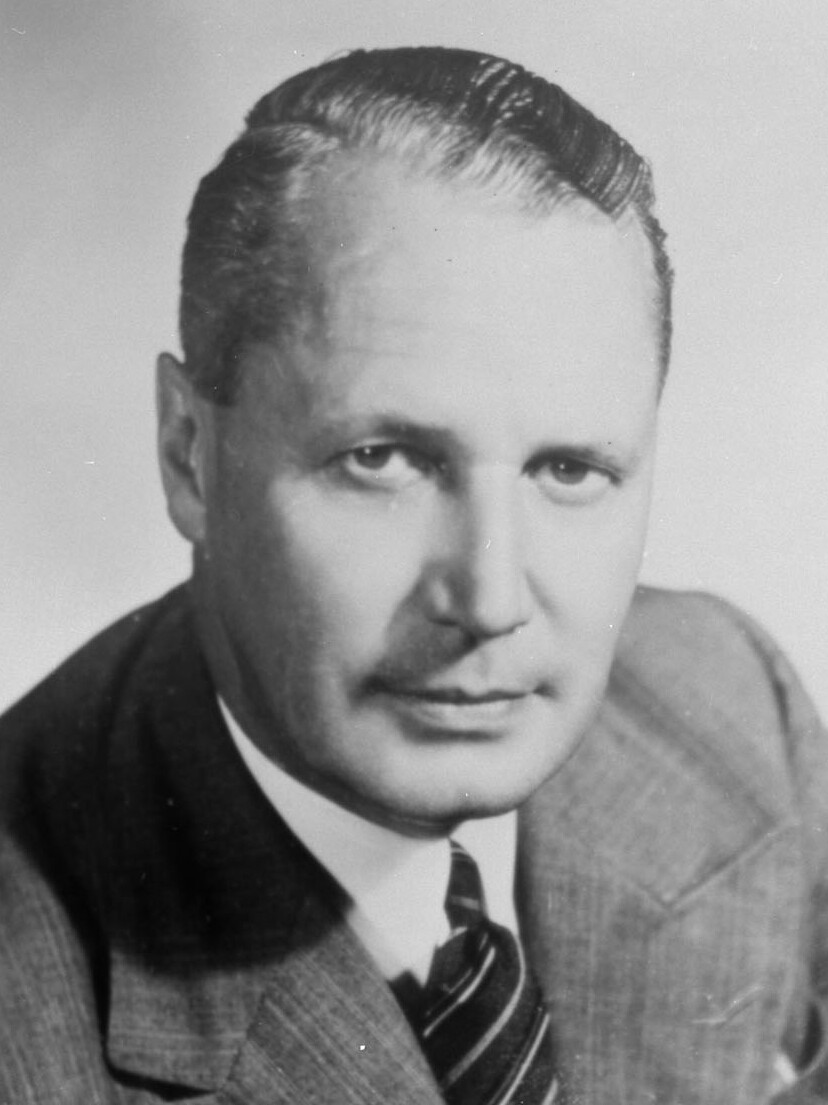

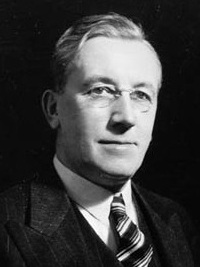

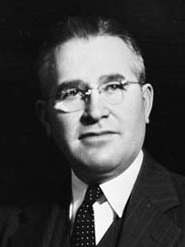
	First party	Second party
Leader	Louis St. Laurent	George A. Drew
Party	Liberal	Progressive Conservative
Leader since	August 7, 1948	October 2, 1948
Leader's seat	Quebec East	Carleton
Last election	118 seats, 39.78%	66 seats, 27.62%
Seats won	191	41
Seat change	▲73	▼25
Popular vote	2,874,813	1,734,261
Percentage	49.15%	29.65%
Swing	▲9.37 pp	▲2.03 pp
	Third party	Fourth party
Leader	Major James Coldwell	Solon Earl Low
Party	Co-operative Commonwealth	Social Credit
Leader since	March 22, 1942	April 6, 1944
Leader's seat	Rosetown—Biggar	Peace River
Last election	28 seats, 15.55%	13 seats, 4.05%
Seats won	13	10
Seat change	▼15	▼3
Popular vote	784,770	135,217
Percentage	13.42%	2.31%
Swing	▼2.13 pp	▼1.74 pp

- The Canadian parliament after the 1949 election
Prime Minister before election
Louis St. Laurent
Liberal
Prime Minister after election
Louis St. Laurent
Liberal

The 1949 Canadian federal election was held June 27, 1949, to elect members of the House of Commons of Canada of the 21st Parliament of Canada.

The Liberal Party of Canada was re-elected with its fourth consecutive government, winning 191 seats (73 per cent of the seats in the House of Commons), with just under 50 per cent of the popular vote.

It was the Liberals' first election in almost thirty years not under the leadership of William Lyon Mackenzie King. King had retired in 1948, and was replaced as Liberal leader and Prime Minister by Louis St. Laurent.

It was the first federal election with Newfoundland voting, having joined Canada in March of that year. It was also the first election since 1904 in which part of the remaining parts of the Northwest Territories were granted representation, following the partitioning off of the provinces of Alberta and Saskatchewan.

The Liberal Party victory won the largest majority in Canadian history to that point. As of 2025, it remains the third largest majority government in Canadian history, and the largest in the party's history (the Progressive Conservative Party won larger seat majorities in 1958 and 1984).

Smaller parties, such as the social democratic Co-operative Commonwealth Federation, and Social Credit, a party that advocated monetary reform, lost support to the Liberals and, to a lesser extent, the Conservatives.

== Overview ==
=== Liberal Party ===
Despite the humiliation of losing his own seat at the previous election, Mackenzie King remained a popular Prime Minister, working to bring about Canadian citizenship as a legal right (Canadians having been previously British subjects), and laying the groundwork for the eventual entry of Newfoundland into the confederation in March 1949. Failing health ultimately forced his resignation in 1948, and his Quebec lieutenant and Secretary for External Affairs, Louis St. Laurent handily won the race to succeed him, beating out fellow cabinet minister James Garfield Gardiner.

The Liberals' polling numbers wavered slightly following St. Laurent's installation as Prime Minister, but they consistently remained well ahead of the Progressive Conservatives, and with the party's polling lead starting to increase again in early 1949, St. Laurent decided to capitalise and called a snap election. While the party had been governing without a stable majority since the previous election, they had generally been able to count on the support of the CCF to pass important legislation; St. Laurent's goal was to win a solid majority and remove his party's need to make concessions to the CCF on matters of confidence.

St. Laurent became the first leader of a major Canadian party to extensively campaign in person since former Conservative leader R. B. Bennett in 1930, projecting an image of himself as a congenial family man. While the campaign was relatively light on actual policy and based mostly around St. Laurent's personality, the approach paid off and saw the Liberals win the biggest parliamentary majority in the country's history until that point (and what remains the Liberals' biggest majority), with the only province where they failed to win at least a plurality of the popular vote being Alberta, where support for Social Credit remained strong; even then, the five seats won in the province by the Liberals has not been matched at any federal election since this one.

=== Progressive Conservatives ===
The Progressive Conservative Party, led by former Premier of Ontario George Drew, lost over a third of their seats. Despite the party's mild recovery at the previous election, they proved a largely ineffective opposition and remained far behind the Liberals in polls throughout the 1945-1949 parliament, largely due to in-fighting between the western faction of previous leader John Bracken, and the party's eastern establishment who favoured the installation of Drew as leader. Drew's own reluctance to step away from his role as Premier of Ontario hampered efforts to remove Bracken, and it wasn't until Drew unexpectedly lost his seat in the Ontario legislature in the 1948 provincial election and announced his intention to move into federal politics that Bracken finally resigned.

While Drew won the leadership of the Progressive Conservatives by a landslide over John Diefenbaker in October 1948, his ascension to the party leadership was overshadowed by St. Laurent's own rise to the Prime Minister's office (additionally, Drew was not an MP when he became party leader, causing him to lose a further two months on a by-election to the Carleton riding after both the CCF and Social Credit fielded candidates and actively campaigned against him, going against the then-usual convention of allowing Canadian party leaders to win by-elections without opposition), meaning that he struggled to make an impression in the media. Support for the party declined across the country in the election, but was felt most keenly in Drew's native Ontario, and to a lesser degree in British Columbia. The party thus failed to win even a plurality of the seat count or popular vote in even a single province or territory (although they did come a very close second in the popular vote in Prince Edward Island). Their national popular vote share actually increased by two percentage points, but most of the extra votes were in earned in Quebec, where they accomplished little due to the large majorities held by Liberal MPs.

=== Co-Operative Commonwealth Federation ===
After something of a breakthrough in the previous federal election, the CCF struggled to keep up its momentum. Their polling numbers peaked in late 1948 when they came close to moving into second place ahead of the Progressive Conservatives, thanks to party leader Major James Coldwell being able to portray an image of experience compared to the new Liberal and Progressive Conservative leaders, but this increase ebbed away after the turn of the year, once St. Laurent and Drew had been able to establish themselves as leaders of their respective parties.

Despite hopes to exploit renewed western alienation that might be generated by the leaders of the two main parties respectively being from Quebec and Ontario, the CCF were largely unable to capitalise and ended up losing over half their parliamentary caucus. In particular, they were decimated in their political base of Saskatchewan, losing all but five of their seats to the Liberals despite coming a close second in the popular vote, and the relative popularity of Tommy Douglas' provincial CCF government. The only saving grace was that the CCF at least remained the main challengers to the Liberals in the west, coming away with 11 seats west of Ontario compared to 10 and 7 respectively for the Socreds and Progressive Conservatives.

=== Social Credit Party ===
For the fourth successive election, Social Credit would only succeed in electing MPs in Alberta, where they continued to control the legislative assembly under Premier Ernest Manning. While their vote and seat count also declined, they held up better than the CCF's did, in part because the resignation of Bracken as Conservative leader and the ensuing abandonment of his western populist policies caused some Progressive Conservative supporters to switch their support to the Socreds, stemming losses to the Liberals. The party thus lost three seats to the Liberals, but remained a comfortable first in the province, making them the only party other than the Liberals to win the most seats and/or votes in a province during this election.

== Opinion polling ==
Evolution of voting intentions at national level
Polling firm	Last day of survey	Source	LPC	PC	CCF	SC	BP	Other	Undecided	ME	Sample
Election 1949	June 27, 1949		49.15	29.65	13.42	2.31	—	5.47			
Gallup	June 1949		49	29	15	—N/a	—N/a	6	22	—N/a	—N/a
Gallup	May 1949		49	29	16	—N/a	—N/a	6	18	—N/a	—N/a
Gallup	April 1949		42	32	17	5	—N/a	4	22	—N/a	—N/a
Gallup	January 1949		40	33	18	—N/a	—N/a	9	23	—N/a	—N/a
Gallup	October 1948		39	27	21	7	—N/a	6	—N/a	—N/a	—N/a
Gallup	August 1948		41	28	20	6	—N/a	5	—N/a	—N/a	—N/a
Gallup	June 1948		41	28	19	6	—N/a	6	—N/a	—N/a	—N/a
Gallup	February 1948		43	28	15	7	—N/a	7	—N/a	—N/a	—N/a
Gallup	January 1948		42	28	16	6	—N/a	8	26	—N/a	—N/a
Gallup	October 1947		43	28	16	6	—N/a	7	—N/a	—N/a	—N/a
Gallup	July 1947		42	27	16	6	—N/a	9	—N/a	—N/a	—N/a
Bloc populaire dissolved (July 6, 1947)
Gallup	May 1947		43	26	16	6	—N/a	9	—N/a	—N/a	—N/a
Gallup	February 1947		41	27	18	7	4	3	—N/a	—N/a	—N/a
Gallup	December 1946		41	26	18	6	5	4	—N/a	—N/a	—N/a
Gallup	September 1946		41	27	17	5	—N/a	10	—N/a	—N/a	—N/a
Gallup	May 1946		44	26	16	4	—N/a	10	—N/a	—N/a	—N/a
Gallup	January 1946		45	24	16	4	—N/a	10	—N/a	—N/a	—N/a
Gallup	November 1945		44	26	17	4	—N/a	9	—N/a	—N/a	—N/a
Election 1945	June 11, 1945		39.78	27.62	15.55	4.05	3.29	9.71			

== National results ==

Party	Party leader	# of candidates	Seats			Popular vote		
Party	Party leader	# of candidates	1945	Elected	% Change	#	%	Change
Liberal	Louis St. Laurent	258	117	191	+63.2%	2,874,813	49.15%	+9.37pp
Progressive Conservative	George Drew	249	65	41	-21.5%	1,734,261	29.65%	+2.03pp
Co-operative Commonwealth	M.J. Coldwell	180	28	13	-53.6%	784,770	13.42%	-2.13pp
Social Credit	Solon Low	28	13	10	-23.1%	135,217	2.31%	-1.74pp
Independent		28	6	4	-33.3%	119,827	2.05%	-2.84pp
Union of Electors	Réal Caouette	56	-	-	-	86,087	1.47%	+1.46pp
Labor–Progressive	Tim Buck	17	1	-	-100%	32,623	0.56%	-1.58pp
Independent Liberal		15	8	1	-87.5%	30,407	0.52%	-1.27pp
Liberal-Labour		2	-	1		11,730	0.20%	+0.19pp
Liberal–Progressive		1	1	1	-	9,192	0.16%	+0.04pp
Independent PC		6	1	-	-100%	8,195	0.14%	-0.14pp
Farmer-Labour		1	-	-	-	6,161	0.11%	-0.07pp
National Unity	Adrien Arcand	1	*	-	*	5,590	0.10%	*
Nationalist		1	*	-	*	4,994	0.09%	*
Independent Social Credit		2	*	-	*	4,598	0.08%	*
Labour		2	-	-	-	415	0.01%	x
Socialist Labour		1	*	-	*	271	x	*
Total		848	245	262	+7.8%	5,849,151	100%	
Sources: http://www.elections.ca -- History of Federal Ridings since 1867

Notes:

* The party did not nominate candidates in the previous election.

x - less than 0.005% of the popular vote

== Vote and seat summaries ==
Ternary plots - shift of electoral support (1945-1949)
1945

1949
Electoral districts identified by colours of winning parties

Popular vote
Liberal	49.15%
PC	29.65%
CCF	13.42%
Social Credit	2.31%
Labor-Progressive	0.56%
Others	4.91%

Seat totals
Liberal	72.90%
PC	15.64%
CCF	4.96%
Social Credit	3.81%
Others	2.67%

== Results by province ==
Party name		BC	AB	SK	MB	ON	QC	NB	NS	PE	NL	Terr	Total
Liberal	Seats:	11	5	14	11	55	68	8	10	3	5	1	191
Liberal	Popular Vote:	36.7	33.8	43.4	45.1	45.1	60.4	53.8	52.7	49.2	71.9	49.0	49.1
Progressive Conservative	Seats:	3	2	1	1	25	2	2	2	1	2	-	41
Progressive Conservative	Vote:	27.9	16.8	14.4	22.0	37.4	24.5	39.4	37.5	48.4	27.9		29.7
Co-operative Commonwealth	Seats:	3	-	5	3	1	-	-	1	-	-	-	13
Co-operative Commonwealth	Vote:	31.5	10.0	40.9	25.9	15.2	1.1	4.2	9.9	2.4	0.2	17.0	13.4
Social Credit	Seats:	-	10	-		-							10
Social Credit	Vote:	0.5	37.4	0.9		0.2							2.3
Independent	Seats:	1			-	-	3	-					4
Independent	Vote:	2.6			2.1	0.1	6.1	0.2				34.0	2.1
Independent Liberal	Seats:					1	-	-					1
Independent Liberal	Vote:					0.3	1.3	1.4					0.5
Liberal-Labour	Seats:					1	-						1
Liberal-Labour	Vote:					0.6	xx						0.2
Liberal-Progressive	Seats:				1								1
Liberal-Progressive	Vote:				2.9								0.2
Total Seats		18	17	20	16	83	73	10	13	4	7	1	262
Parties that won no seats:
Union of Electors	Vote:					0.1	5.1	1.0					1.5
Labor–Progressive	Vote:	0.8	0.7	0.4	2.0	0.7	0.3						0.6
Independent PC	Vote:					xx	0.5						0.1
Farmer-Labour	Vote:					0.3							0.1
National Unity	Vote:						0.4						0.1
Nationalist	Vote:						0.3						0.1
Independent Social Credit	Vote:		1.4										0.1
Labour	Vote:					xx	xx						xx
Socialist Labour	Vote:					xx							xx

- xx - less than 0.05% of the popular vote

== See also ==
- List of Canadian federal general elections
- List of political parties in Canada
- 21st Canadian Parliament
