= Broadview (federal electoral district) =

Former federal electoral district in Ontario, Canada

Ontario electoral district
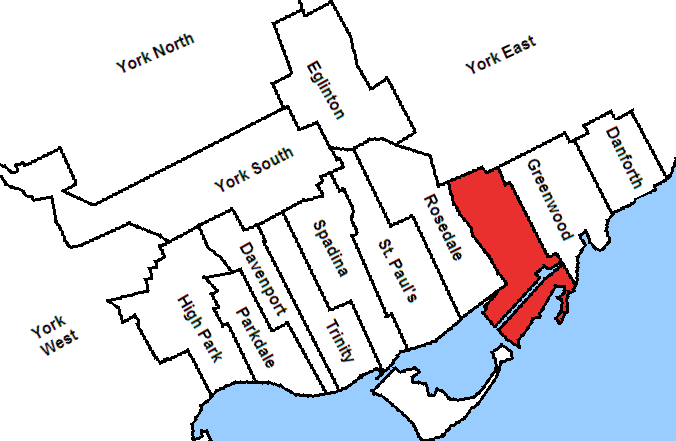
- The boundaries of Broadview as they were from 1933 to 1947

Defunct federal electoral district
- Legislature: House of Commons
- District created: 1933
- District abolished: 1976
- First contested: 1935
- Last contested: 1978

Demographics
- Population (1941): 59,454
- Electors (1945): 41,299
- Census division(s): Toronto
- Census subdivision(s): Toronto

Broadview was a federal electoral district in Ontario, Canada, that was represented in the House of Commons of Canada from 1935 to 1979. This riding was created in 1933 from parts of Toronto East and Toronto—Scarborough ridings.

It initially consisted of the part of the city of Toronto bounded by a line drawn north from Lake Ontario along Leslie Avenue, west along Eastern Avenue, north along Rushbrook Avenue, west along Queen Street, north along Jones Avenue, west along Danforth Avenue, north along Langford Avenue, thence west along the city limits, and south and west along the Don River to Toronto Bay.

In 1966, it was redefined to consist of the part of Metropolitan Toronto bounded by a line drawn north from Lake Ontario along Leslie Street, east along Queen Street East, north along Greenwood Avenue, west along Sammon Avenue, south along Pape Avenue, west along Fulton Avenue to Broadview Avenue, south along the Don River, west along Lake Shore Boulevard East, and south along Cherry Street to Lake Ontario.

Its provincial counterpart in elections to the Ontario Legislative Assembly was the riding of Riverdale which covered much of the same area.

Broadview was abolished in 1976 when it was redistributed between Beaches, Broadview—Greenwood and Rosedale ridings.

== Members of Parliament ==
This riding has elected the following members of Parliament:

Parliament	Years	Member	Party
Riding created from Toronto East and Toronto—Scarborough
18th	1935–1940	Thomas Langton Church	Conservative
19th	1940–1945	Thomas Langton Church	National Government
20th	1945–1949	Thomas Langton Church	Progressive Conservative
21st	1949–1950†	Thomas Langton Church	Progressive Conservative
21st	1950–1953	George Hees	Progressive Conservative
22nd	1953–1957	George Hees	Progressive Conservative
23rd	1957–1958	George Hees	Progressive Conservative
24th	1958–1962	George Hees	Progressive Conservative
25th	1962–1963	George Hees	Progressive Conservative
26th	1963–1965	David Hahn	Liberal
27th	1965–1968	John Gilbert	New Democratic
28th	1968–1972	John Gilbert	New Democratic
29th	1972–1974	John Gilbert	New Democratic
30th	1974–1978	John Gilbert	New Democratic
30th	1978–1979	Bob Rae	New Democratic
Riding dissolved into Beaches, Broadview—Greenwood and Rosedale

== Election results ==
=== 1935 boundaries ===
1935 Canadian federal election
Party	Candidate	Votes
Conservative	Thomas Langton Church	11,380
Liberal	Harold P. Snelgrove	7,527
Co-operative Commonwealth	Graham Spry	5,167
Reconstruction	John C. MacCorkindale	3,793

1940 Canadian federal election
Party	Candidate	Votes
National Government	Thomas Langton Church	14,474
Liberal	George Gresswell	7,866
Co-operative Commonwealth	George Grube	2,613

1945 Canadian federal election
Party	Candidate	Votes
Progressive Conservative	Thomas Langton Church	13,011
Liberal	Joseph McNamara	6,362
Co-operative Commonwealth	George Grube	5,414
Labor–Progressive	Fred Collins	694

1949 Canadian federal election
Party	Candidate	Votes
Progressive Conservative	Thomas Langton Church	10,507
Liberal	Ruth Radford	9,316
Co-operative Commonwealth	George Grube	7,636
Socialist Labour	William Blackwood Hendry	271

On Mr. Church's death, 7 February 1950:

By-election on 15 May 1950
Party	Candidate	Votes
Progressive Conservative	George Hees	10,399
Liberal	Ruth Elizabeth Radford	6,055
Co-operative Commonwealth	George Grube	4,975
Socialist Labour	Charles Weir	184

1953 Canadian federal election
Party	Candidate	Votes
Progressive Conservative	George Hees	10,403
Liberal	Joseph J. Carroll	6,316
Co-operative Commonwealth	Herbert Gargrave	3,910
Labor–Progressive	William Kashtan	224
Socialist Labour	Alan Sanderson	130

1957 Canadian federal election
Party	Candidate	Votes
Progressive Conservative	George Hees	12,815
Liberal	Terrence R. Doidge	4,664
Co-operative Commonwealth	Ron Burns	4,078

1958 Canadian federal election
Party	Candidate	Votes
Progressive Conservative	George Hees	15,364
Liberal	George A. Taylor	4,738
Co-operative Commonwealth	John Alan Lee	3,356
Socialist	Ross Dowson	447

1962 Canadian federal election
Party	Candidate	Votes
Progressive Conservative	George Hees	8,929
Liberal	David Hahn	7,658
New Democratic	Gerry Gallagher	5,330

1963 Canadian federal election
Party	Candidate	Votes
Liberal	David Hahn	8,743
Progressive Conservative	Glen Day	6,684
New Democratic	John Gilbert	5,574
Social Credit	Tom Comerford	166
Independent	Fred Graham	149
Socialist Labour	Alan Sanderson	43

1965 Canadian federal election
Party	Candidate	Votes
New Democratic	John Gilbert	8,232
Liberal	David Hahn	6,876
Progressive Conservative	Richard H. Lyall	5,481
Socialist Labour	William B. Hendry	147

=== 1966 boundaries ===
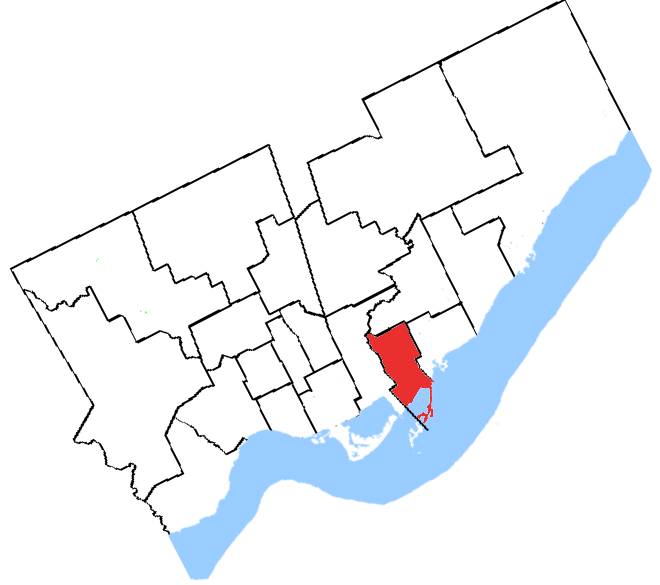
The boundaries of Broadview as they were from 1966 to 1976

1968 Canadian federal election
Party	Candidate	Votes
New Democratic	John Gilbert	10,406
Liberal	Bob Sutherland	9,929
Progressive Conservative	Betty M. Knight	4,752
Socialist Labour	William B. Hendry	202

1972 Canadian federal election
Party	Candidate	Votes
New Democratic	John Gilbert	11,063
Progressive Conservative	Tom Clifford	7,903
Liberal	Peter Murphy	7,465
No affiliation	Alfred Dewhurst	123
No affiliation	Ron Hall	54

1974 Canadian federal election
Party	Candidate	Votes
New Democratic	John Gilbert	9,392
Liberal	Lou Yankou	8,158
Progressive Conservative	Bob Jamieson	5,617
Independent	Walter Belej	137
Communist	Angelo E. Giannakopoulos	128
Marxist–Leninist	Susan Dennis	101
lop.parl.ca

On Mr. Gilbert's resignation, 28 April 1978:

By-election on 16 October 1978
Party	Candidate	Votes
New Democratic	Bob Rae	8,388
Progressive Conservative	Tom Clifford	7,968
Liberal	Philipp Valeris	3,466
Communist	Tom Lianos	204

== See also ==
- List of Canadian electoral districts
- Historical federal electoral districts of Canada
