= Saskatoon (electoral district) =

Former federal electoral district in Saskatchewan, Canada

Saskatoon was a federal electoral district in Saskatchewan, Canada, that was represented in the House of Commons of Canada from 1908 to 1935 and from 1949 to 1968. This riding was created in 1907 from parts of Assiniboia West, Humboldt and Saskatchewan ridings.

The riding was abolished in 1933 when it was redistributed into Rosthern and Saskatoon City ridings. It was recreated in 1947 from parts of Rosthern and Saskatoon City ridings. It was abolished in 1966 when it was redistributed into Moose Jaw, Saskatoon—Biggar, and Saskatoon—Humboldt ridings.

== Election results ==
1908 Canadian federal election
Party	Candidate	Votes
Liberal	George Ewan McCraney	3,645
Conservative	Murdoch Alex. MacInnes	2,168

1911 Canadian federal election
Party	Candidate	Votes
Liberal	George Ewan McCraney	5,328
Conservative	Donald MacLean	3,756
Independent	Newel Edward Baumunk	656

1917 Canadian federal election
Party	Candidate	Votes
Government (Unionist)	James Robert Wilson	9,639
Opposition (Laurier Liberals)	James William Casey	1,833

1921 Canadian federal election
Party	Candidate	Votes
Progressive	John Evans	8,057
Liberal	Peter Donald Stewart	3,943
Conservative	James Robert Wilson	2,909

1925 Canadian federal election
Party	Candidate	Votes
Liberal	Alexander MacGillivray Young	5,303
Conservative	Frank MacMillan	5,114
Progressive	Walter Lee Kirkpatrick	1,417

1926 Canadian federal election
Party	Candidate	Votes
Liberal	Alexander MacGillivray Young	8,058
Conservative	Frank MacMillan	5,706

1930 Canadian federal election
Party	Candidate	Votes
Conservative	Frank MacMillan	11,663
Liberal	Alexander MacGillivray Young	9,799

1949 Canadian federal election
Party	Candidate	Votes
Co-operative Commonwealth	Roy Knight	11,749
Liberal	Charles Wesley McCool	8,868
Progressive Conservative	Alfred Henry Bence	7,013

1953 Canadian federal election
Party	Candidate	Votes
Co-operative Commonwealth	Roy Knight	12,056
Liberal	Charles W. McCool	7,028
Progressive Conservative	Donald C. Disbery	4,661
Social Credit	Malcolm James Haver	990
Labor–Progressive	William Michael Berezowski	264

1957 Canadian federal election
Party	Candidate	Votes
Progressive Conservative	Henry Frank Jones	12,905
Co-operative Commonwealth	Roy Knight	12,022
Liberal	Alex W. Prociuk	6,786
Social Credit	Noble Ernest Britton	2,003

1958 Canadian federal election
Party	Candidate	Votes
Progressive Conservative	Henry Frank Jones	24,622
Co-operative Commonwealth	Roy Knight	10,324
Liberal	Jessie Caldwell	5,505

1962 Canadian federal election
Party	Candidate	Votes
Progressive Conservative	Henry Frank Jones	25,341
New Democratic	David E. Mahood	9,842
Liberal	John George Egnatoff	8,592
Social Credit	Donald Harder	1,556

1963 Canadian federal election
Party	Candidate	Votes
Progressive Conservative	Henry Frank Jones	26,237
Liberal	Sidney Buckwold	13,499
New Democratic	David E. Mahood	8,262
Social Credit	John Wesley Vail	1,256

By-election on 22 June 1964 On Jones' death, 4 March 1964
Party	Candidate	Votes
Progressive Conservative	Eloise Jones	16,551
Liberal	Sidney Buckwold	14,168
New Democratic	Jim Harding	9,459

1965 Canadian federal election
Party	Candidate	Votes
Progressive Conservative	Lewis Brand	21,036
New Democratic	Ben Smillie	15,025
Liberal	Ernest J. Cole	10,529
Social Credit	Delbert M. Dynna	619

== See also ==
- List of Canadian electoral districts
- Historical federal electoral districts of Canada
