= Henry Frank Jones =

Canadian politician

Member of Parliament for Saskatoon
- In office June 1957 – March 1964
- Preceded by: Roy Knight
- Succeeded by: Eloise Jones

Personal details
- Born: 21 August 1920 Lloydminster, Saskatchewan, Canada
- Died: 4 March 1964 (aged 43)
- Party: Progressive Conservative
- Profession: barrister

Henry Frank Jones (21 August 1920 – 4 March 1964) was a Canadian lawyer and politician. Jones served as a Progressive Conservative party member of the House of Commons of Canada. He was born in Lloydminster, Saskatchewan and became a barrister by career.

He was first elected at the Saskatoon riding in the 1957 general election held in June with 12905 votes. He was re-elected there for successive terms in 1958 ( 24622 votes ), 1962 ( 25341 votes ) and 1963 ( 26237 votes ). Jones died in office on 4 March 1964, during his term in the 26th Canadian Parliament.

Jones served as Parliamentary Secretary to the Minister of Veterans Affairs from 1960 to 1963.
