= Lewis Brand =

Canadian politician (1925-1994)

Lewis Mackenzie Brand
- Official 1966 portrait

Member of Parliament for Saskatoon
- In office November 1965 – June 1968

Personal details
- Born: 21 November 1925 Dunfermline, Scotland, United Kingdom
- Died: 15 February 1994 (aged 68) Saskatoon, Saskatchewan
- Party: Progressive Conservative
- Profession: physician, surgeon

Lewis Mackenzie Brand (21 November 1925 – 15 February 1994) was a Progressive Conservative Party member of the House of Commons of Canada. He was a physician and surgeon by career.

He was first elected at the Saskatoon riding in the 1965 general election. After serving one term, the 27th Canadian Parliament, as an Official Opposition MP, Brand was defeated at the newly configured Saskatoon—Humboldt riding by Otto Lang of the Liberal Party in the 1968 federal election. Brand was also unsuccessful in unseating Lang in the 1972 election.

Dr Brand faced numerous sex abuse allegations.
