= Eloise Jones (politician) =

Canadian politician (1917–2004)

Eloise May Jones

Member of Parliament for Saskatoon
- In office 1964–1965
- Preceded by: Henry Jones
- Succeeded by: Lewis Brand

Personal details
- Born: September 7, 1917 Avonmore, Ontario, Canada
- Died: March 8, 2004 (aged 86)
- Party: Progressive Conservative
- Occupation: psychiatrist

Eloise May Jones (née Shaver; September 7, 1917 – March 8, 2004) was a Canadian politician who represented the electoral district of Saskatoon in the House of Commons of Canada from 1964 to 1965.

She won the seat in a by-election on June 22, 1964, following the death of Henry Jones, her husband and the district's incumbent Member of Parliament. She defeated Liberal candidate Sidney Buckwold, a mayor of Saskatoon who had also lost to Henry Jones in the 1963 election. She sat as a member of the Progressive Conservative caucus.

Jones did not stand for reelection in the 1965 election, returning instead to her work as a psychiatrist.
