= Ronald McLelland =

Canadian politician

Ronald David McLelland
- Official 1966 portrait

Member of Parliament for Rosetown—Biggar
- In office November 1965 – April 1968

Personal details
- Born: 27 March 1926 Loreburn, Saskatchewan
- Died: 1 February 2014 (aged 87) Saskatoon, Saskatchewan
- Party: Progressive Conservative
- Profession: farmer

Ronald David McLelland (27 March 1926 – 1 February 2014) was a Progressive Conservative party member of the House of Commons of Canada. He was a farmer by career.

He was elected to Parliament at the Rosetown—Biggar riding in the 1965 general election. After completing only one term in office, the 27th Parliament, McLelland left the House of Commons and did not seek re-election in the 1968 election. He died at a Saskatoon hospital on 1 February 2014.
