= Rosetown (federal electoral district) =

Former federal electoral district in Saskatchewan, Canada

Rosetown was a federal electoral district in Saskatchewan, Canada, that was represented in the House of Commons of Canada from 1925 to 1935. This riding was created in 1924 from parts of Battleford, Kindersley and North Battleford ridings.

It was abolished in 1933 when it was redistributed into The Battlefords and Rosetown—Biggar ridings.

== Election results ==
1925 Canadian federal election
Party	Candidate	Votes
Progressive	EVANS, John	2,974
Liberal	MOONEY, Arthur W.	2,450
Conservative	MILLER, William Willoughby	1,926
Unknown	GIFFORD, Edward B.	136

1926 Canadian federal election
Party	Candidate	Votes
Progressive	EVANS, John	5,635
Conservative	ASELTINE, Walter	2,847

1930 Canadian federal election
Party	Candidate	Votes
Conservative	LOUCKS, William John	5,310
Liberal	RICHARDSON, William	4,237
Progressive	EVANS, John	2,879

== See also ==
- List of Canadian electoral districts
- Historical federal electoral districts of Canada
