= M. J. Coldwell =

Canadian socialist politician (1888–1974)

The Honourable M. J. Coldwell PC CC
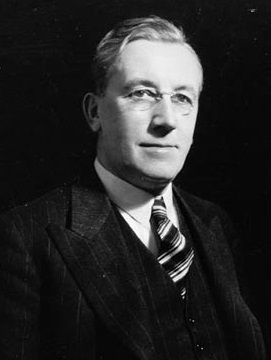

2nd Leader of the Co-operative Commonwealth Federation
- In office July 29, 1942 – August 10, 1960
- Preceded by: J. S. Woodsworth
- Succeeded by: Hazen Argue

2nd National Chairman of the Co-operative Commonwealth Federation
- In office 1938–1942
- Preceded by: J. S. Woodsworth
- Succeeded by: F. R. Scott

Member of Parliament for Rosetown—Biggar
- In office October 14, 1935 – March 30, 1958
- Preceded by: New Constituency
- Succeeded by: Clarence Owen Cooper

1st National Secretary of the Co-operative Commonwealth Federation
- In office 1934–1936
- Preceded by: new office
- Succeeded by: David Lewis

1st Leader of the Saskatchewan Co-operative Commonwealth Federation
- In office 1932–1936
- Preceded by: new office
- Succeeded by: George Hara Williams

Member of the Regina City Council
- In office 1922–1932

Personal details
- Born: Major James William Coldwell; December 2, 1888 Seaton, Devon, England
- Died: August 25, 1974 (aged 85) Ottawa, Ontario, Canada
- Party: Co-operative Commonwealth Federation; New Democratic Party
- Spouse: Norah Dunsford Coldwell (m. 1912)
- Children: 2
- Occupation: Author; principal; teacher

Major James William Coldwell (Note: "Major" was his first name, not a military title.) PC CC (December 2, 1888 – August 25, 1974) was a Canadian democratic socialist politician, and leader of the Co-operative Commonwealth Federation (CCF) party from 1942 to 1960. He served as a Regina city councillor and as a Saskatchewan MP from 1935 to 1958.

Born in England, he immigrated to Canada in 1910. Prior to his political career, he was an educator and union activist. In 1935, he was elected to the House of Commons of Canada for the Rosetown—Biggar electoral district, in Saskatchewan. He was re-elected five times before he was defeated in the 1958 Diefenbaker sweep. He became the CCF's first national secretary in 1934 and the CCF's national leader upon the death of J. S. Woodsworth in 1942. He served as its leader until 1960, when there was a parliamentary caucus revolt against him. When the CCF disbanded in 1961, he joined its successor, the New Democratic Party.

Coldwell is remembered mainly for helping to introduce "welfare state" policies to Canada, by persuading the Liberal government to introduce an Old Age Security programme and child benefits during the mid-1940s. He turned down several offers to join the governing Liberals, including one offer that would have made him prime minister. After his defeat in 1958, he was offered an appointment to the Senate, but he declined this as well. In 1964 he was sworn into the Privy Council, and in 1967 he was one of the initial inductees into the Order of Canada.

== Early life ==
Coldwell was born in Seaton, England on December 2, 1888, the son of Elizabeth (Farrant) and James Henry Coldwell. He attended Exeter University (then called Royal Albert Memorial College), where he met Norah Gertrude Dunsford in 1907, and in December 1909, they became engaged. Norah was born in 1888 and was the daughter of a wealthy newspaper proprietor, John Thomas Dunsford. Coldwell left in February 1910 to teach in Canada's Prairie provinces. He became a school teacher in New Norway, Alberta, and returned to the United Kingdom during summer break in 1912. He and Norah were married at the Wembdon Church in Bridgwater, Somerset, England, on July 22. They honeymooned in England for two weeks and then sailed to Canada, where he continued teaching in Sedley, Saskatchewan. He was known nationally as a leader of teachers' associations from 1924 to 1934.

== Early political career ==
He first ran for the Canadian House of Commons as a Progressive candidate in Regina in the 1925 federal election but was unsuccessful. He was elected as a city councillor for Regina City Council and developed links with labour and farmers' organizations.

In 1926, Coldwell organized the Independent Labour Party (ILP) in Saskatchewan. In 1929, The Farmers' Political Association and the ILP nominated three candidates for the provincial election, under the joint banner of the Saskatchewan Farmer–Labour party, with Coldwell leading it. The party fought the 1934 provincial election under Coldwell's leadership, and it won five seats in the Legislative Assembly of Saskatchewan, making it the official opposition to the Liberal government. Coldwell himself was defeated in his bid for office. After the election, the party affiliated itself with the Co-operative Commonwealth Federation and became the Saskatchewan CCF.

== Elected MP ==
In 1934, Coldwell became the CCF's first national secretary. In the 1935 federal election, he was elected to the House of Commons as Member of Parliament (MP) for the riding of Rosetown-Biggar. He also served as the CCF's national chairman from 1938 to 1942. He split with CCF leader J. S. Woodsworth when World War II broke out in 1939. Woodsworth, a pacifist, opposed the war effort, while Coldwell and the rest of the CCF caucus supported it, as per the party's official position.

== CCF leader ==
Following Woodsworth's stroke in 1940, Coldwell was appointed parliamentary leader of the CCF while Woodsworth remained the party's honorary president. In July 1942, three months after Woodsworth's death, Coldwell was unanimously elected the CCF's new leader at the party's convention. He led the party through five general elections. After an upsurge of support for the party in the mid-1940s, the party embarked on a long decline during the Cold War.

In 1945, Coldwell's book Left Turn Canada was published by Gollancz (London). As well, that year two other of his writings, Jobs and homes for peace: speech delivered in the House of Commons, Sept. 10, 1945, and Planning for peace - CCF proposals. Speeches on the establishment of an international organization for the maintenance of peace and security were published.

The Liberals appropriated many of the CCF's policies and made them government policy. Liberal governments implemented unemployment insurance, family allowances, and universal old age pensions, stealing much of the CCF's thunder and causing the party's electoral fortunes to turn downward during the prosperous 1950s. Coldwell cared much more that his party's policies were becoming law than that he and the CCF received little credit for them.

In 1945, Prime Minister William Lyon Mackenzie King offered Coldwell a Cabinet post in his government. When Coldwell refused, King made another offer, which would have made him the next Liberal leader and, by extension, prime minister. Coldwell again refused, mainly out of loyalty to his party and its principles, and he stated that, "if the country needed me in the Prime Minister's chair, then it would be at the head of a Co-operative Commonwealth Federation government and not as a member of a party with views and politics contradictory to those in which I believed." Rumours that King made Coldwell an offer became public during the 1946 by-election campaign in Parkdale. On October 11, at a rally for the CCF's by-election candidate, Ford Brand, at Parkdale Collegiate Institute, a member of the audience asked Coldwell about the rumour that he had been offered the leadership of the Liberal Party. Coldwell responded by stating that there had been no official offer and that "the Liberals thought they could buy Coldwell. Coldwell is not for sale."

=== 1945 elections: disappointment and defeat ===
Coldwell and the rest of the CCF were looking forward to the federal and Ontario elections of 1945, which would possibly be the most crucial to Canada in the 20th century. They took place at the beginning of the welfare state and set the course of political thought to the end of the century and beyond. The year was a disaster for the CCF, both nationally and in Ontario, which Coldwell and the CCF's main players realized at the time. The CCF never fully recovered and, in 1961, it disbanded and was replaced by the New Democratic Party. As NDP strategist and historian Gerald Caplan put it: "June 4 [Ontario], and June 11 [Canada], 1945, proved to be black days in CCF annals: socialism was effectively removed from the Canadian political agenda."

The antisocialist crusade by the Ontario Conservative Party, mostly credited to the Ontario Provincial Police (OPP) special investigative branch's agent D-208 (Captain William J. Osborne-Dempster) and the Conservative propagandists Gladstone Murray and Montague A. Sanderson, diminished the CCF's initially favourable position both provincially and nationally: the September 1943 Gallup poll showed the CCF leading nationally with 29 per cent support, with the Liberals and the Conservatives tied for second place at 28 per cent. By April 1945, the CCF was down to 20 per cent nationally, and on election day it received only 16 per cent.

Another factor in the CCF's defeat was the unofficial coalition between the Liberal Party of Canada and the communist Labor-Progressive Party which guaranteed a split in the left-of-centre vote.

=== Leadership succession crisis ===
Coldwell had a moderating influence on party policy, and at the party's biannual convention in Winnipeg in 1956, the party passed the Winnipeg Declaration as a statement of party principles to replace the more radical Regina Manifesto. He pushed the party to accept the private sector in a mixed economy in the hope that the new principles would make the CCF more electable.

In the 1958 election, Coldwell lost his seat in the House of Commons, and the party was reduced to a rump of eight MPs. The new Progressive Conservative Prime Minister, John Diefenbaker, offered him an appointment to the Senate, which he declined. After the election, Coldwell often considered resigning the CCF leadership, but the party executive repeatedly dissuaded him from doing so. However, the party needed a leader in the House of Commons, and the CCF parliamentary caucus chose Hazen Argue to fill this role. During the lead-up to the 1960 CCF convention, Argue pressed Coldwell to step down. The leadership challenge jeopardized plans for an orderly transition to the new party that was being planned by the CCF and the Canadian Labour Congress. CCF national president David Lewis, who succeeded Coldwell as president in 1958, when the national chairman and national president positions were merged, and the rest of the new party's organizers both opposed Argue's manoeuvres and wanted Saskatchewan premier Tommy Douglas to be the new party's leader. In an attempt to prevent their plans from derailing, Lewis tried to persuade Argue not to force a vote at the convention on the question of the party's leadership. The vote went ahead, and there was a split between the parliamentary caucus and the party executive on the convention floor. Coldwell stepped down as leader, and Argue replaced him, becoming the party's final national leader.

As far back as 1941, Coldwell wanted Douglas to succeed him as leader of the national CCF, notwithstanding his willingness to assume the national leadership himself. In 1961, with the formation of the "New Party", Coldwell put pressure on Douglas to run for the leadership. Coldwell did not trust Argue, and many in the CCF leadership thought that Argue had been holding secret meetings with the Liberals to merge the "New Party" with the Liberal Party. Also, Coldwell and Douglas thought that Lewis could not defeat Argue because he had no parliamentary seat and, probably more importantly, his role as party disciplinarian over the years had made him too many enemies. Douglas, after much consultation, with Coldwell, Lewis, and his caucus, reluctantly decided in June 1961 to contest the leadership of the New Party. He handily defeated Argue on August 3, 1961. Six months later Argue crossed the floor and became a Liberal.

Coldwell was unenthusiastic about the movement to merge the CCF with the Canadian Labour Congress and create the "New Party", but he joined the New Democratic Party at its founding in 1961, and remained an elder statesman in the NDP until his death in 1974.

== Later life ==
In 1964, he became a member of the Queen's Privy Council for Canada, thereby allowing him to be referred to by the honorific "The Honourable" for the rest of his life. Also in 1964, he was appointed to the House of Commons Advisory Committee on Election Finances chaired by Liberal cabinet minister Judy LaMarsh. In 1966, Prime Minister Lester B. Pearson appointed him to the Royal Commission on Security (the Mackenzie Commission), dealing with the RCMP and security issues that arose from the Munsinger Affair. When Douglas retired as the NDP's leader in April 1971, the party established the Douglas–Coldwell Foundation in Ottawa as its parting gift to both men. The foundation's mandate was to be an intellectual thinktank that formulated ideas and policies for the NDP. On November 5, 1972, Coldwell was honoured by St. Francis Xavier University with a Doctor of Laws degree.

On July 6, 1967, he was appointed a Companion of the Order of Canada. He was invested into the order on November 24, 1967, for "his contribution as a Parliamentarian." It is noteworthy that his Order of Canada medal was sold at auction in 1981, the first time the Order of Canada is known to have been sold. His will did not specify in what manner to dispose of his various medals, so his son sold them to a private collector, who put them up for auction. That same year, the Douglas-Coldwell Foundation purchased the medals back for about $10,000 so that they could be displayed in the Tommy Douglas House museum in Regina.

His health deteriorated in his final years, and he lived alone in his home in Ottawa, with the assistance of his housekeeper, Beatrice Bramwell. He died at age 85 in the Ottawa Civic Hospital after having suffered two heart attacks on August 25, 1974. He had given orders not to perform "heroic measures" to keep him alive.

He is portrayed in the 2006 CBC Television special Prairie Giant: The Tommy Douglas Story by Aidan Devine.

== Archives ==
There is a M. J. Coldwell fonds at Library and Archives Canada. Archival reference number is R4291.

== Sources ==
- Boyko, John (2006). Into the Hurricane: Attacking Socialism and the CCF. Winnipeg: J. Gordon Shillingford Publishing Inc. ISBN 1-897289-09-X.
- Caplan, Gerald (1973). The Dilemma of Canadian Socialism: The CCF in Ontario. Toronto: McClelland and Stewart. ISBN 0-7710-1896-7.
- Horowitz, Gad (1968). Canadian Labour in Politics. Toronto: University of Toronto Press. ISBN 0-8020-1902-1.
- McHenry, Dean Eugene (1950). The Third Force in Canada; the Co-operative Commonwealth Federation 1932–1948. Berkeley: University of California Press.
- McLeod, Thomas; Ian McLeod (2004). The Road to Jerusalem (2 ed.). Calgary: Fifth House. ISBN 1-894856-48-1.
- McNaught, Kenneth (2001) [1959]. A Prophet in Politics: A Biography of J.S. Woodsworth (2 ed.). Toronto: University of Toronto Press. ISBN 0-8020-8427-3.
- Shackleton, Doris French (1975). Tommy Douglas. Toronto: McClelland & Stewart. ISBN 0-7710-8116-2.
- Smith, Cameron (1989). Unfinished Journey: The Lewis Family. Toronto: Summerhill Press. ISBN 0-929091-04-3.
- Smith, Cameron (1992). Love & Solidarity. Toronto: McClelland & Stewart. ISBN 0-7710-8209-6.
- Stewart, Walter (2000). M.J.: The Life and Times of M.J. Coldwell. Toronto: Stoddart Publishing Co. Ltd. ISBN 0-7737-3232-2.
- Stewart, Walter (2003). Tommy: the life and politics of Tommy Douglas. Toronto: McArthur & Company. ISBN 1-55278-382-0.
- Young, Walter D. (1969). The anatomy of a party: the national CCF 1932–61. Toronto: University of Toronto Press. ISBN 0-8020-5221-5.

Parliament of Canada
New constituency	Member of Parliament for Rosetown—Biggar; 1935–1958	Succeeded by Clarence Owen Cooper
Party political offices
New political party	Leader of the Saskatchewan; Co-operative Commonwealth Federation; 1932–1936	Succeeded by George Hara Williams
New political party	National Secretary of the Co-operative Commonwealth Federation; 1934–1936	Succeeded by David Lewis
Preceded by J. S. Woodsworth	National Chairman of the Co-operative Commonwealth Federation; 1938–1942	Succeeded by F. R. Scott
Preceded by J. S. Woodsworth	Leader of the Co-operative Commonwealth Federation; 1942–1960	Succeeded by Hazen Argue
