= Rosetown—Biggar (federal electoral district) =

Former federal electoral district in Saskatchewan, Canada

Rosetown—Biggar was a federal electoral district in Saskatchewan, Canada, that was represented in the House of Commons of Canada from 1935 to 1968. This riding was created in 1933 from parts of Kindersley and Rosetown ridings.

It was abolished in 1966 when it was redistributed into Battleford—Kindersley, Moose Jaw, Regina—Lake Centre, Saskatoon—Biggar and Swift Current—Maple Creek ridings.

== Election results ==
1935 Canadian federal election
Party	Candidate	Votes
Co-operative Commonwealth	Major James Coldwell	6,806
Liberal	William Richardson	4,360
Conservative	William John Loucks	3,228
Social Credit	Joseph Woolsey Heartwell	836

1940 Canadian federal election
Party	Candidate	Votes
Co-operative Commonwealth	Major James Coldwell	7,714
Liberal	Robert P. Hassard	4,912
National Government	James Thomas Milton Anderson	2,381

1945 Canadian federal election
Party	Candidate	Votes
Co-operative Commonwealth	Major James Coldwell	8,484
Liberal	Wilbert Hagarty	3,618
Progressive Conservative	Alvin Hamilton	3,129

1949 Canadian federal election
Party	Candidate	Votes
Co-operative Commonwealth	Major James Coldwell	8,793
Liberal	Sanborn Duff Noble	5,266
Progressive Conservative	Alvin Hamilton	2,670

1953 Canadian federal election
Party	Candidate	Votes
Co-operative Commonwealth	Major James Coldwell	11,404
Liberal	Hubert Staines	5,516
Progressive Conservative	Martin P. Pederson	2,360
Social Credit	Gustav Theodore Froese	877
Labor–Progressive	Harvey Roderick Pearce	387

1957 Canadian federal election
Party	Candidate	Votes
Co-operative Commonwealth	Major James Coldwell	9,846
Progressive Conservative	Howard Spenceley Riddell	5,552
Liberal	Alexander MacDonald	4,994
Social Credit	Henriette Patmore	1,375

1958 Canadian federal election
Party	Candidate	Votes
Progressive Conservative	Clarence Owen Cooper	9,962
Co-operative Commonwealth	Major James Coldwell	8,051
Liberal	Howard C. Mitchell	2,886

1962 Canadian federal election
Party	Candidate	Votes
Progressive Conservative	Clarence Owen Cooper	11,720
New Democratic	Lorne Edward Dietrick	5,362
Liberal	Howard Mitchell	4,101
Social Credit	Allan McIvor	1,069

1963 Canadian federal election
Party	Candidate	Votes
Progressive Conservative	Clarence Owen Cooper	11,984
New Democratic	Rod Thomson	4,661
Liberal	Don Trapp	4,268
Social Credit	Chris Ziegler	716

1965 Canadian federal election
Party	Candidate	Votes
Progressive Conservative	Ronald McLelland	8,658
New Democratic	Alf Gleave	7,067
Liberal	Lew C. Duddridge	4,368
Social Credit	Henry G. Guillaume	465

== See also ==
- List of Canadian electoral districts
- Historical federal electoral districts of Canada
