= Socialist Labor Party (Canada) =

Political party in Canada (1898–2005)

The Socialist Labor Party was a political party in Canada that was formed in 1898 by Canadian supporters of the ideas of American socialist Daniel De Leon and the Socialist Labor Party of America. It became a national party in the 1930s and had its headquarters in Toronto. The party never won any seats. The party ran only a small number of candidates (listed below), all of whom placed last in their respective elections.

The party dissolved in 2005 following the accidental death of its national secretary, Doug Irving.

== Federal election results ==
Election	Candidate	Riding	# of votes
1945	Paul Debragh	Vancouver—Burrard	140
1945	Robert Gordon McQuillan	Vancouver Centre	319
1949	William Blackwood Hendry	Broadview (Toronto)	271
1953	Alan Sanderson	Broadview (Toronto)	130
1963	Alan Sanderson	Broadview (Toronto)	43
1965	William Blackwood Hendry	Broadview (Toronto)	147
1968	William Blackwood Hendry	Broadview (Toronto)	202

== British Columbia provincial election results ==
The party also unsuccessfully contested three provincial elections in British Columbia:

Election	Candidate	Riding	# of votes
1941	John Marshall	Kamloops	19
1941	John Alexander Fedoruk	Vancouver-Burrard	267
1941	Eric Thomas Reaville	Vancouver Centre	393
1941	Robert McQuillan	Vancouver East	271
1945	John Alexander Fedoruk	Vancouver-Burrard	107
1945	Horace Warner	Vancouver Centre	122
1945	Robert McQuillan	Vancouver East	56
1949	John Alexander Fedoruk	Vancouver Centre	286

== Ontario provincial election results ==
The Socialist Labor Party ran candidates in Ontario provincial elections in 1902 and from 1934 until 1967, but never won a seat in the provincial legislature.

Election results
Election year	No. of overall votes	% of overall total	No. of candidates run	No. of seats won	Presence
1902	277	0.06%	4	0 / 98	Extra-parliamentary
1934	1,626	0.10%	5	0 / 90	Extra-parliamentary
1937	2,199	0.14%	11	0 / 90	Extra-parliamentary
1943	740	0.06%	3	0 / 90	Extra-parliamentary
1945	976	0.06%	4	0 / 90	Extra-parliamentary
1948	913	0.05%	5	0 / 125	Extra-parliamentary
1951	371	0.02%	1	0 / 90	Extra-parliamentary
1955	124	0.01%	1	0 / 98	Extra-parliamentary
1959	-	-	-	0 / 98	Extra-parliamentary
1963	103	0.008%	1	0 / 108	Extra-parliamentary
1967	287	0.01%	1	0 / 117	Extra-parliamentary

== See also ==
- List of political parties in Canada
- List of Canadian socialist parties
- Socialism in Canada
