= 17th Canadian Parliament =

1930–35 legislative term

- Majority parliament
- Sep. 8, 1930 – Aug. 14, 1935

Parliament leaders
- Prime minister: R. B. Bennett; Aug. 7, 1930 – Oct. 23, 1935
- Cabinet: 15th Canadian Ministry

Party caucuses
- Government: Conservative Party
- Opposition: Liberal Party
- Crossbench: United Farmers of Alberta
- Progressive Party
- Labour

House of Commons
- Seating arrangements of the House of Commons
- Speaker of the Commons: George Black; 8 September 1930 – 16 January 1935
- James Langstaff Bowman; 17 January 1935 – 5 February 1936
- Members: 245 MP seats List of members

Senate
- Speaker of the Senate: Pierre-Édouard Blondin; 3 September 1930 – 10 January 1936
- Government Senate leader: Wellington Bartley Willoughby; 7 August 1930 – 3 February 1932
- Arthur Meighen; 3 February 1932 – 22 October 1935
- Opposition Senate leader: Raoul Dandurand; 7 August 1930 – 22 October 1935

Sovereign
- Monarch: George V 6 May 1910 – 20 January 1936
- Governor general: Vere Ponsonby; 4 April 1931 – 2 November 1935

Sessions
- 1st session 8 September 1930 – 22 September 1930
- 2nd session 12 March 1931 – 3 August 1931
- 3rd session 4 February 1932 – 26 May 1932
- 4th session 6 October 1932 – 27 May 1933
- 5th session 25 January 1934 – 3 July 1934
- 6th session 17 January 1935 – 5 July 1935
← 16th	→ 18th

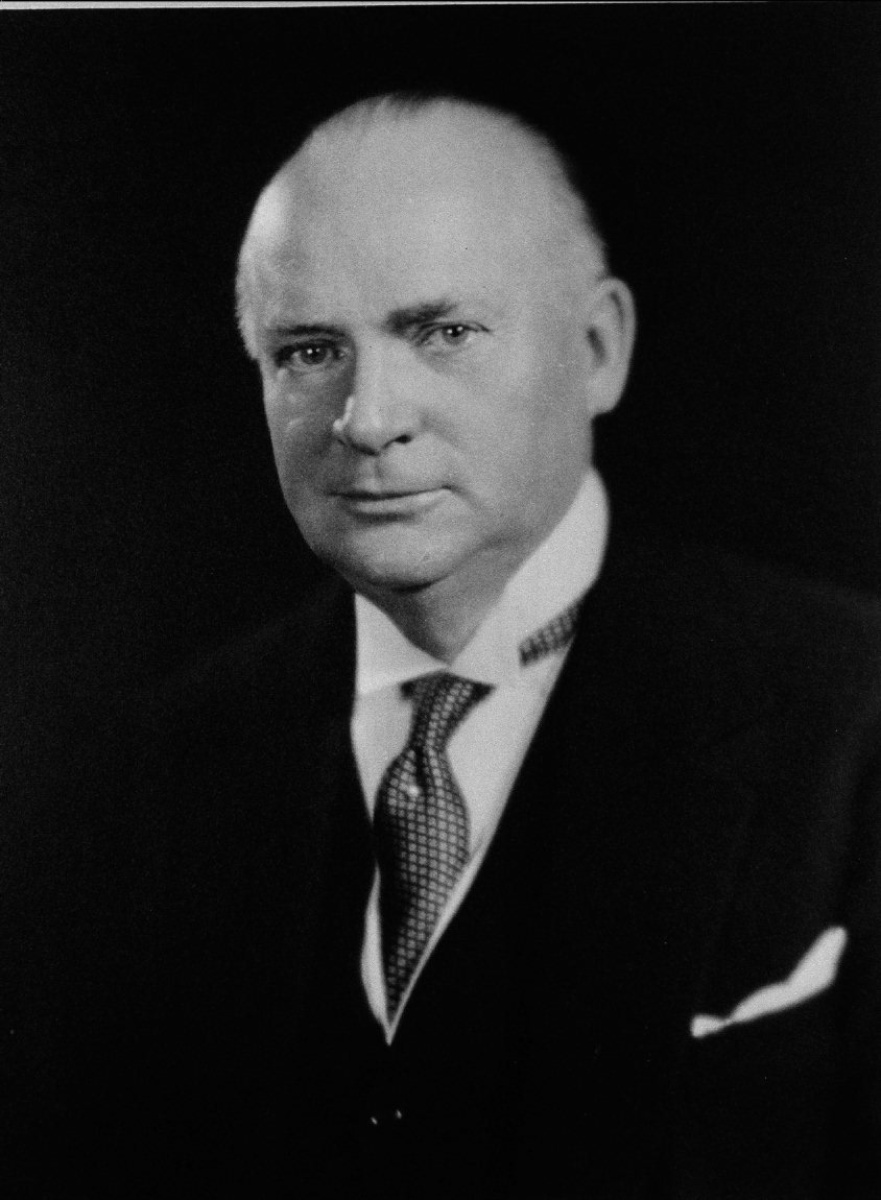
Richard Bedford Bennett was Prime Minister during the 17th Canadian Parliament.

The 17th Canadian Parliament was in session from 8 September 1930, until 14 August 1935. The membership was set by the 1930 federal election on 28 July 1930, and it changed only somewhat due to resignations and by-elections until it was dissolved prior to the 1935 election.

It was controlled by a Conservative Party majority under Prime Minister Richard Bedford Bennett and the 15th Canadian Ministry. The Official Opposition was the Liberal Party, led by William Lyon Mackenzie King.

The Speaker was first George Black, and later James Langstaff Bowman. See also List of Canadian electoral districts 1924-1933 for a list of the ridings in this parliament.

It was the third longest parliament in Canadian history.

There were six sessions of the 17th Parliament:

Session	Start	End
1st	8 September 1930	22 September 1930
2nd	12 March 1931	3 August 1931
3rd	4 February 1932	26 May 1932
4th	6 October 1932	27 May 1933
5th	25 January 1934	3 July 1934
6th	17 January 1935	5 July 1935

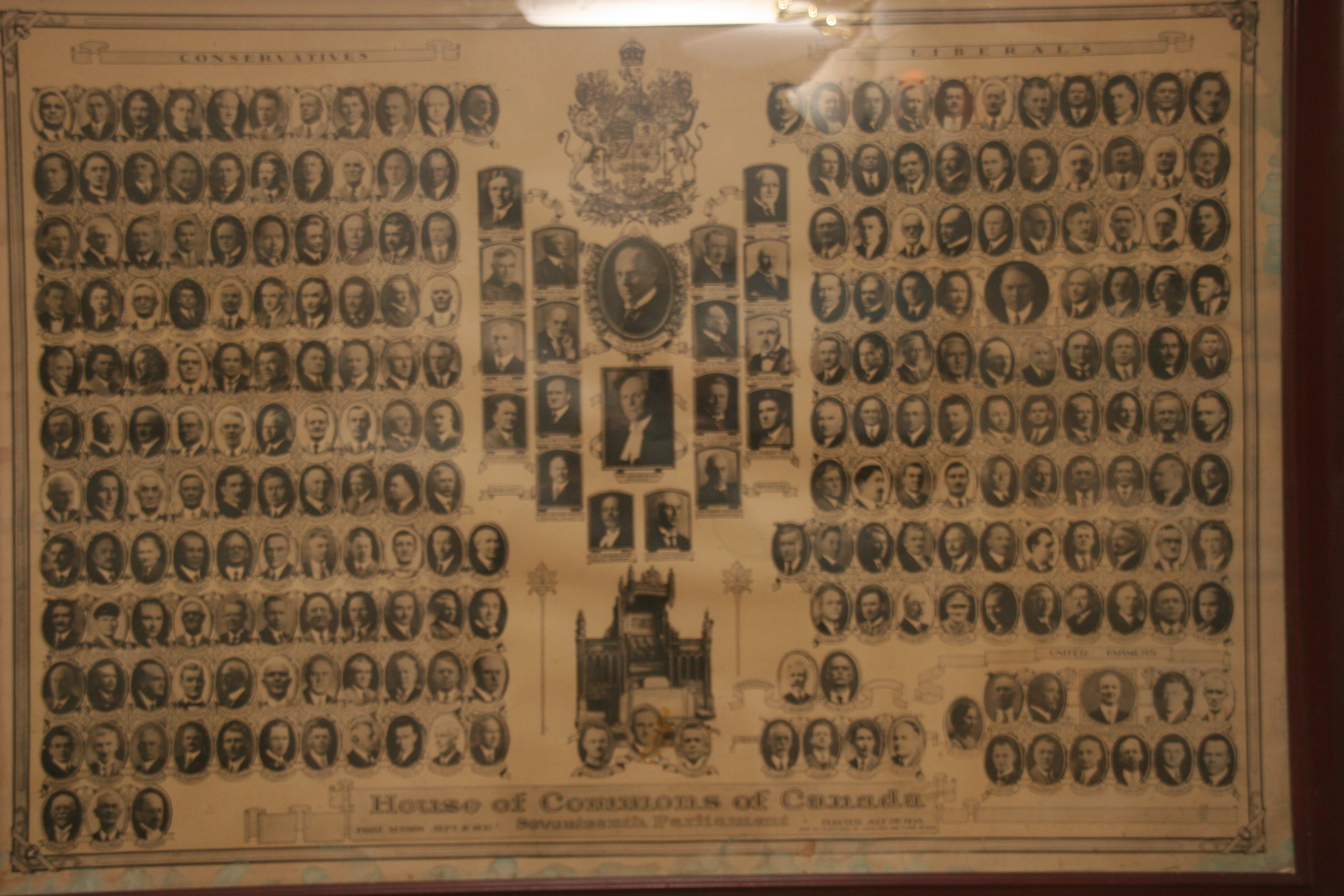
parliament of Canada 1930 seating plan

== List of members ==
Following is a full list of members of the seventeenth Parliament listed first by province, then by electoral district.

Key:

- Party leaders are italicized.
- Cabinet ministers are in **boldface**.
- The Prime Minister is **both**.
- The Speaker is indicated by "(†)".

Electoral districts denoted by an asterisk (*) indicates that district was represented by two members.

=== Alberta ===
Electoral district	Name	Party	First elected/previously elected	No. of terms
Acadia	Robert Gardiner	United Farmers of Alberta	1921	5th term
Athabaska	John Francis Buckley (died 27 November 1931)	Liberal	1930	1st term
Athabaska	Percy Griffith Davies (by-election of 1932-03-21)	Conservative	1932	1st term
Battle River	Henry Elvins Spencer	United Farmers of Alberta	1921	4th term
Bow River	Edward Joseph Garland	United Farmers of Alberta	1921	4th term
Bow River	Edward Joseph Garland	C.C.F.	1921	4th term
Calgary East	George Douglas Stanley	Conservative	1930	1st term
Calgary West	**Richard Bedford Bennett** (until 7 July 1930 emoulment appointment)	Conservative	1911, 1925	4th term*
Calgary West	**Richard Bedford Bennett** (by-election of 1930-08-25)	Conservative	1911, 1925	4th term*
Camrose	William Thomas Lucas	United Farmers of Alberta	1921	4th term
Edmonton East	Ambrose Bury	Conservative	1925, 1930	2nd term*
Edmonton West	Charles Stewart	Liberal	1925	3rd term
Lethbridge	John Smith Stewart	Conservative	1930	1st term
Macleod	George Gibson Coote	United Farmers of Alberta	1921	4th term
Medicine Hat	Frederick William Gershaw	Liberal	1925	3rd term
Peace River	Donald MacBeth Kennedy	United Farmers of Alberta	1921	4th term
Red Deer	Alfred Speakman	United Farmers of Alberta	1921	4th term
Vegreville	Michael Luchkovich	United Farmers of Alberta	1926	2nd term
Wetaskiwin	William Irvine	United Farmers of Alberta	1921, (Note: East Calgary (First elected as a Labour)) 1926	3rd term*
Wetaskiwin	William Irvine	C.C.F.	1921, 1926	3rd term*

=== British Columbia ===
Electoral district	Name	Party	First elected/previously elected	No. of terms
Cariboo	John Fraser	Conservative	1925	3rd term
Comox—Alberni	Alan Webster Neill	Independent	1921	4th term
Fraser Valley	Harry James Barber	Conservative	1925	3rd term
Kootenay East	Michael Dalton McLean (until 7 August 1930 emoulment appointment)	Conservative	1930	1st term
Kootenay East	**Henry Herbert Stevens** (by-election of 1930-08-25)	Conservative	1911	6th term
Kootenay West	William Esling	Conservative	1925	3rd term
Nanaimo	Charles Dickie	Conservative	1921	4th term
New Westminster	Thomas Reid	Liberal	1930	1st term
Skeena	Olof Hanson	Liberal	1930	1st term
Vancouver—Burrard	Wilfred Hanbury	Liberal	1930	1st term
Vancouver Centre	Ian Alistair Mackenzie	Liberal	1930	1st term
Vancouver North	Albert Edward Munn	Liberal	1930	1st term
Vancouver South	Angus MacInnis	Independent Labour	1930	1st term
Vancouver South	Angus MacInnis	C.C.F.	1930	1st term
Victoria	D'Arcy Plunkett	Conservative	1928	2nd term
Yale	**Grote Stirling**	Conservative	1924	4th term

=== Manitoba ===
Electoral district	Name	Party	First elected/previously elected	No. of terms
Brandon	David Wilson Beaubier	Conservative	1930	1st term
Dauphin	James Langstaff Bowman (†)	Conservative	1930	1st term
Lisgar	John Livingstone Brown	Liberal-Progressive	1921	4th term
Macdonald	William Gilbert Weir	Liberal-Progressive	1930	1st term
Marquette	Henry Mullins	Conservative	1925, 1930	2nd term*
Neepawa	**Thomas Gerow Murphy** (until 7 August 1930 emoulment appointment)	Conservative	1925, 1930	2nd term*
Neepawa	**Thomas Gerow Murphy** (by-election of 1930-08-25)	Conservative	1925, 1930	2nd term*
Nelson	Bernard Munroe Stitt	Conservative	1930	1st term
Portage la Prairie	William Herbert Burns	Conservative	1930	1st term
Provencher	Arthur-Lucien Beaubien	Liberal-Progressive	1921	4th term
Selkirk	James Herbert Stitt	Conservative	1930	1st term
Souris	Errick Willis	Progressive Conservative	1930	1st term
Springfield	Thomas Hay	Conservative	1917, (Note: Selkirk) 1925, 1930	3rd term*
St. Boniface	John Power Howden	Liberal	1925	3rd term
Winnipeg North	A. A. Heaps	Labour	1925	3rd term
Winnipeg North	A. A. Heaps	C.C.F.	1925	3rd term
Winnipeg North Centre	J. S. Woodsworth	Labour	1921	4th term
Winnipeg North Centre	J. S. Woodsworth	C.C.F.	1921	4th term
Winnipeg South	Robert Rogers	Conservative	1911, 1925, 1930	3rd term*
Winnipeg South Centre	William Walker Kennedy	Conservative	1925, 1930	2nd term*

=== New Brunswick ===
Electoral district	Name	Party	First elected/previously elected	No. of terms
Charlotte	Arthur D. Ganong	Conservative	1930	1st term
Gloucester	Peter Veniot	Liberal	1926	2nd term
Kent	Télesphore Arsenault	Conservative	1930	1st term
Northumberland	George Manning McDade	Conservative	1930	1st term
Restigouche—Madawaska	Maxime Cormier	Conservative	1930	1st term
Restigouche—Madawaska	Joseph-Enoil Michaud (by-election of 1933-10-23)	Liberal	1933	1st term
Royal	George Burpee Jones	Conservative	1921	4th term
Royal	George Burpee Jones (by-election of 1932-06-27)	Conservative	1921	4th term
St. John—Albert*	Thomas Bell	Conservative	1925	3rd term
St. John—Albert*	**Murray MacLaren**	Conservative	1921	4th term
St. John—Albert*	**Murray MacLaren** (by-election of 1930-08-25)	Conservative	1921	4th term
Victoria—Carleton	Benjamin Franklin Smith	Conservative	1930	1st term
Westmorland	Otto Baird Price	Conservative	1925	3rd term
York—Sunbury	**Richard Hanson**	Conservative	1921	5th term

=== Nova Scotia ===
Electoral district	Name	Party	First elected/previously elected	No. of terms
Antigonish—Guysborough	William Duff	Liberal	1917, (Note: Lunenburg/Queens—Lunenburg) 1927	5th term*
Cape Breton North—Victoria	Lewis Wilkieson Johnstone	Conservative	1925	3rd term
Cape Breton South	Finlay MacDonald	Conservative	1925	3rd term
Colchester	Martin Luther Urquhart	Liberal	1930	1st term
Cumberland	Robert Knowlton Smith	Conservative	1925	3rd term
Digby—Annapolis	Harry Short	Conservative	1925	3rd term
Halifax*	William Anderson Black	Conservative	1923	4th term
Halifax*	Felix Patrick Quinn	Conservative	1925	3rd term
Hants—Kings	James Lorimer Ilsley	Liberal	1926	2nd term
Inverness	Isaac Duncan MacDougall	Conservative	1925	3rd term
Pictou	Thomas Cantley	Conservative	1925	3rd term
Queens—Lunenburg	**William Gordon Ernst**	Conservative	1926	2nd term
Richmond—West Cape Breton	John Alexander Macdonald (until 22 August 1930 emoulment appointment)	Conservative	1925	3rd term
Richmond—West Cape Breton	**Edgar Nelson Rhodes** (by-election of 1930-09-02)	Conservative	1908, (Note: Cumberland) 1930	4th term*
Shelburne—Yarmouth	James Ralston	Liberal	1926	2nd term

=== Ontario ===
Electoral district	Name	Party	First elected/previously elected	No. of terms
Algoma East	George Nicholson	Conservative	1917, 1925, 1930	3rd term*
Algoma West	Thomas Edward Simpson	Conservative	1917	5th term
Brantford City	Robert Edwy Ryerson	Conservative	1925	3rd term
Brant	Franklin Smoke	Conservative	1925	3rd term
Bruce North	James Malcolm	Liberal	1921	4th term
Bruce South	Walter Allan Hall	Liberal	1925	3rd term
Carleton	William Foster Garland	Conservative	1912, 1921	5th term*
Dufferin—Simcoe	**William Earl Rowe**	Conservative	1925	3rd term
Durham	Fred Wellington Bowen	Conservative	1921	4th term
Elgin West	Mitchell Hepburn (resigned 8 June 1934)	Liberal	1926	2nd term
Elgin West	Wilson Mills (by-election of 1934-09-24)	Liberal	1934	1st term
Essex East	Raymond Ducharme Morand	Conservative	1925, 1930	2nd term*
Essex South	Eccles James Gott	Conservative	1925	3rd term
Essex West	Sidney Cecil Robinson	Conservative	1925	3rd term
Fort William	**Robert Manion** (until 7 August 1930 ministerial appointment)	Conservative	1917	5th term
Fort William	**Robert Manion** (by-election of 1930-08-25)	Conservative	1917	5th term
Frontenac—Addington	William Spankie (died 27 May 1934)	Conservative	1929	2nd term
Frontenac—Addington	Colin Campbell (by-election of 1934-09-24)	Liberal	1934	1st term
Glengarry	Angus McGillis	Conservative	1930	1st term
Grenville—Dundas	Arza Clair Casselman	Conservative	1921, 1925	4th term*
Grey North	Victor Porteous	Conservative	1930	1st term
Grey Southeast	Agnes Macphail	Progressive	1921	4th term
Grey Southeast	Agnes Macphail	C.C.F.	1921	4th term
Grey Southeast	Agnes Macphail	United Farmers of Ontario-Labour	1921	4th term
Haldimand	Mark Senn	Conservative	1921	4th term
Halton	Robert King Anderson	Conservative	1917	5th term
Hamilton East	George Rennie (died 13 October 1930)	Conservative	1926	2nd term
Hamilton East	Humphrey Mitchell (by-election of 1931-08-10)	Labour	1931	1st term
Hamilton West	Charles William Bell	Conservative	1925	3rd term
Hastings—Peterborough	Alexander Thomas Embury	Conservative	1925	3rd term
Hastings South	William Ernest Tummon	Conservative	1925	3rd term
Huron North	George Spotton	Conservative	1927	2nd term
Huron South	Thomas McMillan (died 7 June 1932)	Liberal	1925	3rd term
Huron South	William Henry Golding (by-election of 1932-10-03)	Liberal	1932	1st term
Kenora—Rainy River	Peter Heenan (resigned 10 July 1934 to take seat in Ontario Legislature)	Liberal	1925	3rd term
Kenora—Rainy River	Hugh McKinnon (by-election of 1934-09-24)	Liberal	1934	1st term
Kent	James Rutherford	Liberal	1926	2nd term
Kingston City	Arthur Edward Ross	Conservative	1921	4th term
Lambton East	John Thomas Sproule	Conservative	1930	1st term
Lambton West	Ross Gray	Liberal	1929	2nd term
Lanark	Thomas Alfred Thompson	Conservative	1930	1st term
Leeds	**Hugh Alexander Stewart** (until 7 August 1930 emoulment appointment)	Conservative	1921	4th term
Leeds	**Hugh Alexander Stewart** (by-election of 1930-08-25)	Conservative	1921	4th term
Lincoln	James Dew Chaplin	Conservative	1917	5th term
London	John Franklin White	Conservative	1921	4th term
Middlesex East	Frank Boyes	Conservative	1930	1st term
Middlesex West	John Campbell Elliott	Liberal	1925	3rd term
Muskoka—Ontario	Peter McGibbon	Conservative	1925	3rd term
Nipissing	Raoul Hurtubise	Liberal	1930	1st term
Norfolk—Elgin	William Horace Taylor	Liberal	1926	2nd term
Northumberland	William Alexander Fraser	Liberal	1930	1st term
Ontario	William Henry Moore	Liberal	1930	1st term
Ottawa (City of)*	T. Franklin Ahearn	Liberal	1930	1st term
Ottawa (City of)*	Edgar-Rodolphe-Eugène Chevrier	Liberal	1921, 1926	3rd term*
Oxford North	**Donald Matheson Sutherland** (until emoulment appointment)	Conservative	1925, 1930	2nd term*
Oxford North	**Donald Matheson Sutherland** (by-election of 1930-08-25)	Conservative	1925, 1930	2nd term*
Oxford South	Thomas Merritt Cayley (died in office)	Liberal	1926	2nd term
Oxford South	Almon Rennie (by-election of 1934-04-16)	Liberal	1934	1st term
Parkdale	David Spence	Conservative	1921	4th term
Parry Sound	James Arthurs	Conservative	1908	7th term
Peel	Samuel Charters	Conservative	1917	5th term
Perth North	David McKenzie Wright	Conservative	1925, 1930	2nd term*
Perth South	Fred Sanderson	Liberal	1925	3rd term
Peterborough West	Edward Armour Peck	Conservative	1925	3rd term
Port Arthur—Thunder Bay	Donald James Cowan	Conservative	1926	2nd term
Prescott	Elie-Oscar Bertrand	Liberal	1929	2nd term
Prince Edward—Lennox	John Aaron Weese	Conservative	1930	1st term
Renfrew North	Ira Delbert Cotnam	Conservative	1925	3rd term
Renfrew South	Martin James Maloney	Conservative	1925	3rd term
Russell	Alfred Goulet	Liberal	1925	3rd term
Simcoe East	Alfred Burke Thompson	Conservative	1925	3rd term
Simcoe North	John Thomas Simpson	Conservative	1930	1st term
Stormont	Frank Thomas Shaver	Conservative	1930	1st term
Timiskaming North	Joseph-Arthur Bradette	Liberal	1926	2nd term
Timiskaming South	**Wesley Ashton Gordon** (until ministerial appointment)	Conservative	1930	1st term
Timiskaming South	**Wesley Ashton Gordon** (by-election of 1930-08-25)	Conservative	1930	1st term
Toronto East	**Edmond Baird Ryckman** (until ministerial appointment)	Conservative	1921	4th term
Toronto East	**Edmond Baird Ryckman** (by-election of 1930-08-25, then died in office)	Conservative	1921	4th term
Toronto East	Thomas Langton Church (by-election of 1934-09-24)	Conservative	1921, (Note: Toronto North/Toronto Northwest) 1934	4th term*
Toronto East Centre	**Robert Charles Matthews**	Conservative	1926	2nd term
Toronto—High Park	Alexander James Anderson	Conservative	1925	3rd term
Toronto Northeast	Richard Langton Baker	Conservative	1925, 1930	2nd term*
Toronto Northwest	John Ritchie MacNicol	Conservative	1930	1st term
Toronto—Scarborough	Joseph Henry Harris	Conservative	1921	4th term
Toronto South	**George Reginald Geary**	Conservative	1925	3rd term
Toronto West Centre	Samuel Factor	Liberal	1930	1st term
Victoria	Thomas Hubert Stinson	Conservative	1925	3rd term
Waterloo North	William Daum Euler	Liberal	1917	5th term
Waterloo South	Alexander Edwards	Conservative	1925	3rd term
Welland	**George Hamilton Pettit**	Conservative	1925	3rd term
Wellington North	John Knox Blair	Liberal	1930	1st term
Wellington South	**Hugh Guthrie** (until ministerial appointment)	Conservative	1900	9th term
Wellington South	**Hugh Guthrie** (by-election of 1930-08-25)	Conservative	1900	9th term
Wentworth	Gordon Crooks Wilson	Conservative	1911	6th term
York North	Thomas Herbert Lennox (died in office)	Conservative	1925	3rd term
York North	William Pate Mulock (by-election of 1934-09-24)	Liberal	1934	1st term
York South	Robert Henry McGregor	Conservative	1926	2nd term
York West	**Earl Lawson**	Conservative	1928	2nd term

=== Prince Edward Island ===
Electoral district	Name	Party	First elected/previously elected	No. of terms
King's	**John Alexander Macdonald**	Conservative	1925	3rd term
Prince	Alfred Edgar MacLean	Liberal	1921	4th term
Queen's*	Chester McLure	Conservative	1930	1st term
Queen's*	John Howard Myers	Conservative	1930	1st term

=== Quebec ===
Electoral district	Name	Party	First elected/previously elected	No. of terms
Argenteuil	**George Halsey Perley**	Conservative	1904, 1925	6th term*
Bagot	Cyrille Dumaine	Liberal	1930	2nd term
Beauce	Édouard Lacroix	Liberal	1925	3rd term
Beauharnois	Maxime Raymond	Liberal	1925	3rd term
Bellechasse	Joseph Oscar Lefebre Boulanger	Liberal	1926	2nd term
Berthier—Maskinongé	Joseph-Arthur Barrette	Conservative	1911, 1930	2nd term*
Bonaventure	Charles Marcil	Liberal	1900	9th term
Brome—Missisquoi	Follin Horace Pickel	Conservative	1930	1st term
Cartier	Samuel William Jacobs	Liberal	1917	5th term
Chambly—Verchères	**Alfred Duranleau** (until 7 August 1930 emoulment appointment)	Conservative	1930	1st term
Chambly—Verchères	**Alfred Duranleau** (by-election of 1930-08-25)	Conservative	1930	1st term
Champlain	Jean-Louis Baribeau	Conservative	1930	1st term
Charlevoix—Saguenay	Pierre-François Casgrain	Liberal	1917	5th term
Chicoutimi	Alfred Dubuc	Liberal	1925	3rd term
Châteauguay—Huntingdon	John Clarke Moore	Conservative	1930	1st term
Compton	**Samuel Gobeil**	Conservative	1930	1st term
Dorchester	**Onésime Gagnon**	Conservative	1930	1st term
Drummond—Arthabaska	Wilfrid Girouard	Liberal	1925	3rd term
Gaspé	Maurice Brasset	Liberal	1930	1st term
Hochelaga	Édouard-Charles St-Père	Liberal	1921	4th term
Hull	Alphonse Fournier	Liberal	1930	1st term
Jacques Cartier	Georges-Philippe Laurin	Conservative	1930	1st term
Joliette	Charles-Édouard Ferland	Liberal	1928	2nd term
Kamouraska	Joseph Georges Bouchard	Liberal	1922	4th term
Labelle	Henri Bourassa	Independent	1896, (Note: First elected as a Liberal) 1925	6th term*
Lake St. John	Joseph-Léonard Duguay	Conservative	1930	1st term
Laprairie—Napierville	Vincent Dupuis	Liberal	1929	2nd term
L'Assomption—Montcalm	Paul-Arthur Séguin	Liberal	1908	7th term
Laurier—Outremont	Joseph-Alexandre Mercier	Liberal	1925	3rd term
Laval—Two Mountains	**Arthur Sauvé** (until 7 August 1930 emoulment appointment)	Conservative	1930	1st term
Laval—Two Mountains	**Arthur Sauvé** (by-election of 1930-08-25)	Conservative	1930	1st term
Lévis	Émile Fortin	Conservative	1930	1st term
L'Islet	Joseph-Fernand Fafard	Liberal	1917	5th term
Lotbinière	Joseph-Achille Verville	Liberal	1925	3rd term
Maisonneuve	Clément Robitaille (died 16 January 1932)	Liberal	1921	4th term
Maisonneuve	Joseph Jean (by-election of 1932-06-27)	Liberal	1932	1st term
Matane	Henri LaRue	Conservative	1930	1st term
Mégantic	Eusèbe Roberge	Liberal	1922	4th term
Montmagny	Armand Lavergne	Conservative	1904, 1930	3rd term*
Mount Royal	Robert Smeaton White	Conservative	1888, (Note: Cardwell (Ontario)) 1925	5th term*
Nicolet	Lucien Dubois	Liberal	1930	1st term
Pontiac	Charles Bélec	Conservative	1930	1st term
Portneuf	Jules Desrochers	Liberal	1930	1st term
Québec—Montmorency	Charles-Napoléon Dorion	Conservative	1930	1st term
Quebec East	Ernest Lapointe	Liberal	1904	9th term
Quebec South	Charles Gavan Power	Liberal	1917	5th term
Quebec West	**Maurice Dupré** (until 7 August 1930 emoulment appointment)	Conservative	1930	1st term
Quebec West	**Maurice Dupré** (by-election of 1930-08-25)	Conservative	1930	1st term
Richelieu	Arthur Cardin	Liberal	1911	6th term
Richmond—Wolfe	François-Joseph Laflèche	Conservative	1930	1st term
Rimouski	Eugène Fiset	Liberal	1924	4th term
St. Ann	John Alexander Sullivan	Conservative	1930	1st term
St. Antoine	Leslie Gordon Bell	Conservative	1925	3rd term
St. Denis	Arthur Denis	Liberal	1921	4th term
St. Henri	Paul Mercier	Liberal	1921	4th term
St. Hyacinthe—Rouville	Adélard Fontaine	Liberal	1930	1st term
St. James	Fernand Rinfret	Liberal	1920	5th term
St. Johns—Iberville	Martial Rhéaume	Liberal	1930	1st term
St. Lawrence—St. George	**Charles Cahan** (until 7 August 1930 emoulment appointment)	Conservative	1925	3rd term
St. Lawrence—St. George	**Charles Cahan** (by-election of 1930-08-25)	Conservative	1925	3rd term
St. Mary	Hermas Deslauriers	Liberal	1917	5th term
Shefford	J.-Eugène Tétreault	Conservative	1926	2nd term
Sherbrooke	Charles Benjamin Howard	Liberal	1925	3rd term
Stanstead	John Thomas Hackett	Conservative	1930	1st term
Terrebonne	Louis-Étienne Parent	Liberal	1930	1st term
Three Rivers—St. Maurice	Arthur Bettez (died 4 January 1931)	Liberal	1925	3rd term
Three Rivers—St. Maurice	Charles Bourgeois (by-election of 1931-08-10)	Conservative	1931	1st term
Témiscouata	Jean-François Pouliot	Liberal	1924	4th term
Vaudreuil—Soulanges	Joseph Thauvette	Liberal	1930	1st term
Wright	Fizalam-William Perras	Liberal	1925	3rd term
Yamaska	Aimé Boucher (until election voided 23 December 1932)	Liberal	1921	5th term
Yamaska	Aimé Boucher (by-election of 1933-10-23)	Liberal	1921	5th term

=== Saskatchewan ===
Electoral district	Name	Party	First elected/previously elected	No. of terms
Assiniboia	Robert McKenzie	Liberal	1925	3rd term
Humboldt	Albert Frederick Totzke	Liberal	1925	3rd term
Kindersley	Archibald M. Carmichael	Progressive	1921	4th term
Last Mountain	Harry Butcher	Liberal	1930	1st term
Long Lake	Walter Davy Cowan	Conservative	1917, (Note: Regina) 1930	2nd term*
Mackenzie	Milton Neil Campbell (until 6 February 1933 emoulment appointment)	Progressive	1921	4th term
Mackenzie	John Angus MacMillan (by-election of 1933-10-23)	Liberal	1933	1st term
Maple Creek	James Beck Swanston	Conservative	1930	1st term
Melfort	**Robert Weir** (until 8 August 1930 emoulment appointment)	Conservative	1930	1st term
Melfort	**Robert Weir** (by-election of 1930-08-25)	Conservative	1930	1st term
Melville	William Richard Motherwell	Liberal	1921	4th term
Moose Jaw	William Addison Beynon	Conservative	1930	1st term
North Battleford	Cameron Ross McIntosh	Liberal	1925	3rd term
Prince Albert	William Lyon Mackenzie King	Liberal	1908, (Note: Waterloo North (Ontario)) 1919, (Note: Prince (PEI)/York North (Ontario)) 1926	6th term*
Qu'Appelle	Ernest Perley	Liberal	1930	1st term
Regina	Franklin White Turnbull	Conservative	1930	1st term
Rosetown	William John Loucks	Liberal	1930	1st term
Saskatoon	Frank MacMillan	Conservative	1930	1st term
South Battleford	John Vallance	Liberal	1925	3rd term
Swift Current	Charles Edward Bothwell	Liberal	1925	3rd term
Weyburn	Edward James Young	Liberal	1925	3rd term
Willow Bunch	Thomas F. Donnelly	Liberal	1925	3rd term
Yorkton	George Washington McPhee	Liberal	1925	3rd term

=== Yukon ===
Electoral district	Name	Party	First elected/previously elected	No. of terms
Yukon	George Black (†)	Conservative	1921	4th term

== By-elections ==
By-election	Date	Incumbent	Party	Winner	Party	Cause	Retained
Frontenac—Addington	September 24, 1934	William Spankie	Conservative	Colin Campbell	Liberal	Death	No
Toronto East	September 24, 1934	Edmond Baird Ryckman	Conservative	Thomas Langton Church	Conservative	Death	Yes
Kenora—Rainy River	September 24, 1934	Peter Heenan	Liberal	Hugh McKinnon	Liberal	Resignation	Yes
Elgin West	September 24, 1934	Mitchell Hepburn	Liberal	Wilson Mills	Liberal	Resignation	Yes
York North	September 24, 1934	Thomas Herbert Lennox	Conservative	William Pate Mulock	Liberal	Death	No
Oxford South	April 16, 1934	Thomas Merritt Cayley	Liberal	Almon Rennie	Liberal	Death	Yes
Yamaska	October 23, 1933	Aimé Boucher	Liberal	Aimé Boucher	Liberal	Election declared void	Yes
Mackenzie	October 23, 1933	Milton Neil Campbell	Progressive	John Angus MacMillan	Liberal	Appointed vice-president of the Tariff Board	No
Restigouche—Madawaska	October 23, 1933	Maxime Cormier	Conservative	Joseph Michaud	Liberal	Death	No
Huron South	October 3, 1932	Thomas McMillan	Liberal	William Henry Golding	Liberal	Death	Yes
Maisonneuve	June 27, 1932	Clément Robitaille	Liberal	Joseph Jean	Liberal	Death	Yes
Royal	June 27, 1932	George Burpee Jones	Conservative	George Burpee Jones	Conservative	Resignation	Yes
Athabaska	March 21, 1932	John Francis Buckley	Liberal	Percy Griffith Davies	Conservative	Death	No
Three Rivers—St. Maurice	August 10, 1931	Arthur Bettez	Liberal	Charles Bourgeois	Conservative	Death	No
Hamilton East	August 10, 1931	George Septimus Rennie	Conservative	Humphrey Mitchell	Labour	Death	No
Richmond—West Cape Breton	September 2, 1930	John Alexander Macdonald	Conservative	Edgar Nelson Rhodes	Conservative	Resignation to provide a seat for Rhodes	Yes
Melfort	August 25, 1930	Robert Weir	Conservative	Robert Weir	Conservative	Recontested upon appointment as Minister of Agriculture.	Yes
Oxford North	August 25, 1930	Donald Matheson Sutherland	Conservative	Donald Matheson Sutherland	Conservative	Recontested upon appointment as Minister of National Defence.	Yes
Leeds	August 25, 1930	Hugh Alexander Stewart	Conservative	Hugh Alexander Stewart	Conservative	Recontested upon appointment as Minister of Public Works.	Yes
Kootenay East	August 25, 1930	Michael Dalton McLean	Conservative	Henry Herbert Stevens	Conservative	Resignation to provide a seat for Stevens	Yes
Laval—Two Mountains	August 25, 1930	Arthur Sauvé	Conservative	Arthur Sauvé	Conservative	Recontested upon appointment as Postmaster General.	Yes
Toronto East	August 25, 1930	Edmond Baird Ryckman	Conservative	Edmond Baird Ryckman	Conservative	Recontested upon appointment as Minister of National Revenue.	Yes
Neepawa	August 25, 1930	Thomas Gerow Murphy	Conservative	Thomas Gerow Murphy	Conservative	Recontested upon appointment as Minister of the Interior.	Yes
Fort William	August 25, 1930	Robert James Manion	Conservative	Robert James Manion	Conservative	Recontested upon appointment as Minister of Railways and Canals.	Yes
St. John—Albert	August 25, 1930	Murray MacLaren	Conservative	Murray MacLaren	Conservative	Recontested upon appointment as Minister of Pensions and National Health.	Yes
Wellington South	August 25, 1930	Hugh Guthrie	Conservative	Hugh Guthrie	Conservative	Recontested upon appointment as Minister of Justice.	Yes
Timiskaming South	August 25, 1930	Wesley Gordon	Conservative	Wesley Gordon	Conservative	Recontested upon appointment as Minister of Immigration and Colonization and Minister of Mines.	Yes
Chambly—Verchères	August 25, 1930	Alfred Duranleau	Conservative	Alfred Duranleau	Conservative	Recontested upon appointment as Minister of Marine.	Yes
Quebec West	August 25, 1930	Maurice Dupré	Conservative	Maurice Dupré	Conservative	Recontested upon appointment as Solicitor General.	Yes
St. Lawrence—St. George	August 25, 1930	Charles Cahan	Conservative	Charles Cahan	Conservative	Recontested upon appointment as Secretary of State of Canada.	Yes
Calgary West	August 25, 1930	R. B. Bennett	Conservative	R. B. Bennett	Conservative	Recontested upon appointment as Prime Minister and Minister of Finance.	Yes
