= John Frederick Johnston =

Canadian politician

The Honourable John Frederick Johnston

Canadian Senator from Saskatchewan
- In office 5 October 1943 – 9 May 1948
- Appointed by: William Lyon Mackenzie King

Member of Parliament for Lake Centre
- In office 14 October 1935 – 26 March. 1940
- Preceded by: Riding established
- Succeeded by: John Diefenbaker

Member of Parliament for Long Lake
- In office 29 October 1925 – 28 July 1930
- Preceded by: Riding established
- Succeeded by: Walter Davy Cowan

Member of Parliament for Last Mountain
- In office 17 December 1917 – 29 October 1925
- Preceded by: Riding established
- Succeeded by: William Russell Fansher

Deputy Speaker of the House of Commons and Chair of the Committees of the Whole House of Commons
- In office 14 December 1926 – 30 May 1930
- Preceded by: William Duff
- Succeeded by: Armand Lavergne

Personal details
- Born: 16 July 1876 Bogarttown, Ontario, Canada
- Died: 9 May 1948 (aged 71)
- Party: Liberal Party of Canada
- Other political affiliations: Progressive Party of Canada; Liberal-Unionist
- Occupation: Politician; businessman; farmer; rancher

John Frederick Johnston (16 July 1876 – 9 May 1948) was a Canadian politician.

== Background ==
Johnston was born to a wealthy family in Bogarttown, Ontario that owned lumber and flour mills in Simcoe County.

He moved to Saskatchewan in 1905 and ultimately settled on a farm near Bladworth, Saskatchewan. In addition to his farm, he owned a lumberyard and hardware store in town and developed a string of general stores in the region.

He was elected by acclamation to the House of Commons of Canada in the 1917 wartime election as a Liberal-Unionist representing Last Mountain. The Liberal Party had split over the Conscription Crisis of 1917 and Johnston was one of the Liberals who broke with Sir Wilfrid Laurier in order to support the pro-conscription Union Government formed by Conservative Prime Minister Sir Robert Borden.

During the parliament, Johnston broke with both the government and the Liberals to support the new agrarian based Progressive Party formed by Thomas Crerar. He won the Progressive Party nomination in his riding and was re-elected in the 1921 federal election as a Progressive MP and became the party's chief whip in the House of Commons of Canada.

Johnston supported co-operation between the Progressives and the Liberals. He was re-elected as a Progressive MP, this time in the riding of Long Lake in the 1925 federal election. The Liberals lost seats in the election but stayed in power leading a minority government. Prime Minister William Lyon Mackenzie King convinced Johnston to cross the floor and join the Liberals in early 1926 in an attempt to buttress his government's support. He was re-elected as a Liberal in the 1926 federal election and, in December 1926, became Deputy Speaker of the House of Commons of Canada.

Johnston was defeated in the 1930 federal election by his Conservative opponent and returned to the farm. He was again elected to parliament in the 1935 federal election, this time in the riding of Lake Centre but was defeated in the 1940 federal election by John Diefenbaker of the Tories.

Johnston was appointed to the Senate of Canada by Mackenzie King in 1943 and sat in the upper house until his death in 1948.
