= Lake Centre =

Former federal electoral district in Saskatchewan, Canada

Lake Centre was a federal electoral district in Saskatchewan, Canada, that was represented in the House of Commons of Canada from 1935 to 1953. This riding was created in 1933 from parts of the ridings of Last Mountain, Long Lake and Regina. From 1940 to 1953, the riding's Member of Parliament was John Diefenbaker, who later served as Prime Minister of Canada from 1957 to 1963 (though he was the member for Prince Albert by then).

It was abolished in 1952 when it was redistributed into Melville, Moose Jaw—Lake Centre, Rosetown—Biggar and Yorkton ridings.

== Election results ==
1935 Canadian federal election
Party	Candidate	Votes
Liberal	JOHNSTON, John Frederick	5,894
Conservative	PETERS, Allan Armstrong	4,100
Co-operative Commonwealth	FANSHER, William Russell	3,909
Social Credit	HARTNEY, Russell	1,474

1940 Canadian federal election
Party	Candidate	Votes
National Government	DIEFENBAKER, John George	5,974
Liberal	JOHNSTON, John Frederick	5,694
Co-operative Commonwealth	FANSHER, William Russell	4,793

1945 Canadian federal election
Party	Candidate	Votes
Progressive Conservative	DIEFENBAKER, John George	6,884
Co-operative Commonwealth	BRIGHT, Leslie John	5,875
Liberal	LATTA, Frank Campbell	3,812

1949 Canadian federal election
Party	Candidate	Votes
Progressive Conservative	DIEFENBAKER, John George	8,845
Co-operative Commonwealth	VALLEAU, Delmar Storey	5,413
Liberal	MACRAE, Donald Arthur	3,061
Social Credit	HALDEMAN, Joshua Norman	856

== See also ==
- List of Canadian electoral districts
- Historical federal electoral districts of Canada
