= Long Lake (electoral district) =

Former federal electoral district in Saskatchewan, Canada

Long Lake was a federal electoral district in Saskatchewan, Canada, that was represented in the House of Commons of Canada from 1925 to 1935. This riding was created in 1924 from parts of Last Mountain and Regina ridings.

It was abolished in 1933 when it was redistributed into Lake Centre and Rosthern ridings.

== Election results ==
1925 Canadian federal election
Party	Candidate	Votes
Progressive	JOHNSTON, John Frederick	3,497
Conservative	ADRAIN, Stewart	1,904
Independent Progressive	KETCHESON, Harry Wilmot	1,768

1926 Canadian federal election
Party	Candidate	Votes
Liberal	JOHNSTON, John Frederick	5,113
Conservative	POUND, William	3,599

1930 Canadian federal election
Party	Candidate	Votes
Conservative	COWAN, Walter Davy	5,577
Liberal	JOHNSTON, John Frederick	5,383
Farmer	MCNEAL, Ida Elizabeth	1,516

== See also ==
- List of Canadian electoral districts
- Historical federal electoral districts of Canada
