= Maharg =

Surname list

Maharg is a surname. Notable people with the surname include:

- Billy Maharg (1881–1953), American boxer
- John Archibald Maharg (1872–1944), Canadian politician in Saskatchewan
