= Harry Butcher =

Harry Butcher may refer to:

- Harry Butcher (racing driver) (1894–1942), American race car driver
- Harry Butcher (politician) (1873–1956), Canadian politician
- Harry C. Butcher (1901–1985), radio broadcaster and naval aide to General Dwight D. Eisenhower

== See also ==
- Henry Butcher (disambiguation)
