= Gordon Beattie Martin =

Canadian politician (1932–2022)

The Honourable Beattie Martin ECS
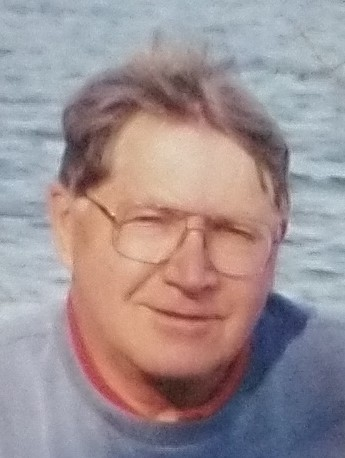

MLA for Regina Wascana
- In office 1986–1991
- Preceded by: Gordon Currie

Personal details
- Born: March 10, 1932 Regina, Saskatchewan, Canada
- Died: October 4, 2022 (aged 90) Saskatchewan, Canada
- Party: Progressive Conservative Party of Saskatchewan
- Spouse: Louise Jean Duncan (m. 1960)
- Relations: Beattie Martin (father); William Melville Martin (uncle)
- Occupation: Broadcaster

Gordon Beattie Martin (March 10, 1932 – October 4, 2022) was a Canadian CBC sportscaster and political figure in Saskatchewan. He represented Regina Wascana from 1986 to 1991 in the Legislative Assembly of Saskatchewan as a Progressive Conservative.

Martin was born in Regina, Saskatchewan, on March 10, 1932, the son of Dr. Robert Beattie Martin and Francis Mildred Spooner, and was educated at the University of Saskatchewan. His uncle William Melville Martin served as a Liberal premier for the province. In 1960, Martin married Louise Jean Duncan. He served in the provincial cabinet as Minister of the Family. He was defeated by Doreen Hamilton when he ran for reelection to the assembly in 1991.

Martin was ordered to repay $2,900 in the aftermath of the Saskatchewan Progressive Conservative fraud scandal.

In 1987 Beattie Martin was the Legislative Secretary to the Minister of Education.

Martin served as the Minister of Environment and Public Safety from June to November 1991, the Minister of the Family from October 1989 to November 1991, the Minister Responsible for Seniors from October 1989 to November 1991, and as the Minister of Culture, Multiculturalism and Recreation from June 1990 to January 1991.

An avid sports person, he played and then reported on hockey, football including being a defensive back for the Regina Rams, baseball, basketball, curling, golf, water-skiing and tennis.

Martin began his career in Radio and Television with CFSL Radio in Weyburn, moving to CJME Regina in 1959 as a sports editor and then sports director before moving to CKRM radio briefly prior to landing at CBC (CBK) Regina in 1964 as sports director.

Martin supported community athletics including serving as a member of the Regina Junior Rams football executive. He was instrumental in the creation of the Saskatchewan Water-ski Association being the coach and manager when the team went to the National Water-ski Championships in 1968 and manager and coach of the Saskatchewan Water-ski team which entered in the 1969 Canada Summer Games. He was also an Alumni Representative on the University of Regina Men's Athletic Board and the chair of the first annual Ducks Unlimited (Canada) Regina first annual dinner and auction. Martin died on October 4, 2022, at the age of 90.
