= Athabaska (electoral district) =

Former federal electoral district in Alberta, Canada

Alberta electoral district

Defunct federal electoral district
- Legislature: House of Commons
- District created: 1924
- District abolished: 1966
- First contested: 1925
- Last contested: 1965

Athabaska was a federal electoral district Alberta, Canada, that was represented in the House of Commons of Canada from 1925 to 1968.

== History ==
This riding was created as "Athabaska" in 1924 from parts of Battle River, Edmonton East and Edmonton West ridings. Its first election was poorly conducted with many election irregularities. The culprits, two Edmonton lawyers, barely avoided criminal prosecution.

The riding was abolished in 1966 when it was redistributed into Athabasca, Peace River and Vegreville ridings.

== Members of Parliament ==
This riding has elected the following members of the House of Commons of Canada:

Athabaska
Parliament	Years	Member	Party
Riding created from Battle River, Edmonton East and Edmonton West
15th	1925–1926	Charles Wilson Cross	Liberal
16th	1926–1930	Donald Ferdinand Kellner	United Farmers of Alberta
17th	1930–1932	John Francis Buckley	Liberal
17th	1932–1935	Percy Griffith Davies	Conservative
18th	1935–1940	Percy John Rowe	Social Credit
19th	1940–1945	Joseph Miville Dechene	Liberal
20th	1945–1949	Joseph Miville Dechene	Liberal
21st	1949–1953	Joseph Miville Dechene	Liberal
22nd	1953–1957	Joseph Miville Dechene	Liberal
23rd	1957–1958	Joseph Miville Dechene	Liberal
24th	1958–1962	Jack Bigg	Progressive Conservative
25th	1962–1963	Jack Bigg	Progressive Conservative
26th	1963–1965	Jack Bigg	Progressive Conservative
27th	1965–1968	Jack Bigg	Progressive Conservative
Riding dissolved into Athabasca, Peace River and Vegreville

== Election results ==
=== 1965 ===
1965 Canadian federal election
Party	Candidate	Votes	%	±%
Progressive Conservative	Jack Bigg	11,652	54.05	–0.49
Liberal	Dave Hunter	6,692	31.04	+6.58
Social Credit	Joe Van Hauwaert	2,197	10.19	–6.08
New Democratic	Peter Grant Forman	1,016	4.71	–0.01
Total valid votes		21,557	99.39	
Total rejected ballots		133	0.61	+0.16
Turnout		21,690	75.78	–3.01
Eligible voters/turnout		28,622		
Progressive Conservative hold		Swing		+3.04
Source: Library of Parliament

=== 1963 ===
1963 Canadian federal election
Party	Candidate	Votes	%	±%
Progressive Conservative	Jack Bigg	12,074	54.54	+8.93
Liberal	Richard Edward Hall	5,416	24.47	–1.71
Social Credit	Peter Chaba	3,601	16.27	–5.79
New Democratic	Alex Szchechina	1,045	4.72	–1.43
Total valid votes		22,136	99.55	
Total rejected ballots		101	0.45	–0.41
Turnout		22,237	78.79	+1.69
Eligible voters/turnout		28,223		
Progressive Conservative hold		Swing		+3.61
Source: Library of Parliament

=== 1962 ===
1962 Canadian federal election
Party	Candidate	Votes	%	±%
Progressive Conservative	Jack Bigg	9,678	45.61	–6.12
Liberal	Jules Van Brabant	5,554	26.18	+2.45
Social Credit	Joe Mikkelsen	4,679	22.05	+1.86
New Democratic	Pierre-Maurice Vallée	1,306	6.16	+1.81
Total valid votes		21,217	99.14	
Total rejected ballots		185	0.86	+0.37
Turnout		21,402	77.10	+3.62
Eligible voters/turnout		27,757		
Progressive Conservative hold		Swing		–1.83
Source: Library of Parliament

=== 1958 ===
1958 Canadian federal election
Party	Candidate	Votes	%	±%
Progressive Conservative	Jack Bigg	9,751	51.73	+39.96
Liberal	Joachim Peter Renaud	4,473	23.73	–17.72
Social Credit	Archie A. McPhail	3,806	20.19	–18.90
Co-operative Commonwealth	Nick Baron	820	4.35	–3.33
Total valid votes		18,850	99.50	
Total rejected ballots		94	0.50	–0.18
Turnout		18,944	73.49	+2.51
Eligible voters/turnout		25,778		
Progressive Conservative gain from Liberal		Swing		+11.12
Source: Library of Parliament

=== 1957 ===
1957 Canadian federal election
Party	Candidate	Votes	%	±%
Liberal	Joseph Miville Dechene	7,453	41.45	–8.09
Social Credit	Archie A. McPhail	7,029	39.10	+2.08
Progressive Conservative	Alec Shore	2,116	11.77	–
Co-operative Commonwealth	Nicholas W. Svekla	1,381	7.68	+1.52
Total valid votes		17,979	99.33	
Total rejected ballots		122	0.67	–0.23
Turnout		18,101	70.98	+9.97
Eligible voters/turnout		25,502		
Liberal hold		Swing		–3.01
Source: Library of Parliament

=== 1953 ===
1953 Canadian federal election
Party	Candidate	Votes	%	±%
Liberal	Joseph Miville Dechene	7,956	49.54	+4.03
Social Credit	Albert Edward Pearce	5,945	37.02	+7.05
Labor–Progressive	Daniel Gamache	1,168	7.27	–
Co-operative Commonwealth	Robert Joseph Philipzyk	990	6.16	–4.29
Total valid votes		16,059	99.09	
Total rejected ballots		147	0.91	–0.11
Turnout		16,206	61.01	–6.97
Eligible voters/turnout		26,563		
Liberal hold		Swing		+5.54
Source: Library of Parliament

=== 1949 ===
1949 Canadian federal election
Party	Candidate	Votes	%	±%
Liberal	Joseph Miville Dechene	7,566	45.52	+9.74
Social Credit	Orvis A. Kennedy	4,982	29.97	–2.58
Co-operative Commonwealth	John Hannochko	1,738	10.46	–1.39
Independent Social Credit	John Nykiforuk	1,198	7.21	–
Progressive Conservative	Joseph H. Bédard	1,139	6.85	–2.43
Total valid votes		16,623	98.98	
Total rejected ballots		171	1.02	–0.40
Turnout		16,794	67.98	+5.20
Eligible voters/turnout		24,703		
Liberal hold		Swing		+3.58
Source: Library of Parliament

=== 1945 ===
1945 Canadian federal election
Party	Candidate	Votes	%	±%
Liberal	Joseph Miville Dechene	5,301	35.77	–10.69
Social Credit	Arthur Bruce Hickox	4,823	32.55	–
Co-operative Commonwealth	John Mandius Wagner	1,756	11.85	–4.14
Labor–Progressive	Beatrice Ferneyhough	1,564	10.55	–
Progressive Conservative	Robert Wilson Shopland	1,375	9.28	–
Total valid votes		14,819	98.58	
Total rejected ballots		213	1.42	–0.01
Turnout		15,032	62.78	+7.30
Eligible voters/turnout		23,944		
Liberal hold		Swing		+10.93
Source: Library of Parliament

=== 1940 ===
1940 Canadian federal election
Party	Candidate	Votes	%	±%
Liberal	Joseph Miville Dechene	5,961	46.46	+17.64
New Democracy	William Hayhurst	4,817	37.54	–
Co-operative Commonwealth	Percy John Rowe	2,052	15.99	–
Total valid votes		12,830	98.57	
Total rejected ballots		186	1.43	+0.04
Turnout		13,016	55.48	+0.77
Eligible voters/turnout		23,460		
Liberal gain from Social Credit		Swing		+27.59
Source: Library of Parliament

=== 1935 ===
1935 Canadian federal election
Party	Candidate	Votes	%	±%
Social Credit	Percy John Rowe	5,424	51.99	–
Liberal	James Owen McNamee	3,007	28.82	–6.69
Conservative	Adéodat Boileau	1,269	12.16	–25.86
Technocrat	Joseph McCrae Newman	733	7.03	–
Total valid votes		10,433	98.61	
Total rejected ballots		147	1.39	+1.39
Turnout		10,580	54.71	–
Eligible voters/turnout		19,339		
Social Credit gain from Conservative		Swing		+22.65
Source: Library of Parliament

=== 1932 by-election ===
Canadian federal by-election, March 21, 1932 Death of John Francis Buckley.
Party	Candidate	Votes	%	±%
Conservative	Percy Griffith Davies	4,910	38.02	+19.40
Liberal	Isaac Stanley Doze	4,586	35.51	–10.69
United Farmers of Alberta	Louis Normandeau	3,418	26.47	–8.71
Total valid votes		12,914	100.00	
Total rejected ballots		unknown		
Turnout		12,914	–	–
Eligible voters/turnout				
Conservative gain from Liberal		Swing		+4.35
Source: Library of Parliament

=== 1930 ===
1930 Canadian federal election
Party	Candidate	Votes	%	±%
Liberal	John Francis Buckley	5,504	46.21	+9.95
United Farmers of Alberta	Donald Ferdinand Kellner	4,190	35.17	–28.57
Conservative	Emanuel Michajluk	2,218	18.62	–
Total valid votes		11,912	99.36	
Total rejected ballots		77	0.64	–0.21
Turnout		11,989	61.12	+15.01
Eligible voters/turnout		19,617		
Liberal gain from United Farmers of Alberta		Swing		–9.31
Source: Library of Parliament

=== 1926 ===
1926 Canadian federal election
Party	Candidate	Votes	%	±%
United Farmers of Alberta	Donald Ferdinand Kellner	4,870	63.74	–
Liberal	Charles Wilson Cross	2,770	36.26	–17.94
Total valid votes		7,640	99.14	
Total rejected ballots		66	0.86	+0.08
Turnout		7,706	46.10	–5.45
Eligible voters/turnout		16,715		
United Farmers of Alberta gain from Liberal		Swing		+63.74
Source: Library of Parliament

=== 1925 ===
1925 Canadian federal election
Party	Candidate	Votes	%	±%
Liberal	Charles Wilson Cross	5,078	54.20	–
Progressive	Donald Ferdinand Kellner	3,648	38.94	–
Conservative	Charles Jenry Gauvreau	643	6.86	–
Total valid votes		9,369	99.23	
Total rejected ballots		73	0.77	
Turnout		9,442	51.55	
Eligible voters/turnout		18,316		
Liberal notional gain from		Swing		–
Source: Library of Parliament

== See also ==
- List of Canadian electoral districts
- Historical federal electoral districts of Canada
