= Percy John Rowe =

Canadian politician

Member of Parliament for Athabaska
- In office 1935–1940
- Preceded by: Percy Griffith Davies
- Succeeded by: Joseph Miville Dechene

Personal details
- Born: November 18, 1893 Bowmanville, Ontario, Canada
- Died: January 26, 1978 (aged 84) Lakeview, Ontario, Canada
- Party: Social Credit Party of Canada
- Profession: accountant

Percival John Rowe (November 18, 1893 – January 26, 1978) was an accountant and a Canadian federal politician. He was born in Bowmanville, Ontario.

Rowe ran for the House of Commons of Canada as a candidate from the Social Credit Party of Canada. He was elected by a comfortable margin defeating 3 other candidates. He would leave the Social Credit party and run for the Co-operative Commonwealth Federation in the 1940 Canadian federal election and be defeated finishing a distant 3rd place by Liberal candidate Joseph Miville Dechene and Social Credit Member of Parliament William Hayhurst who had previously represented the Vegreville riding. He died in Lakeview, Ontario in 1978.
