= Charles Wilson Cross =

Canadian politician (1872–1928)

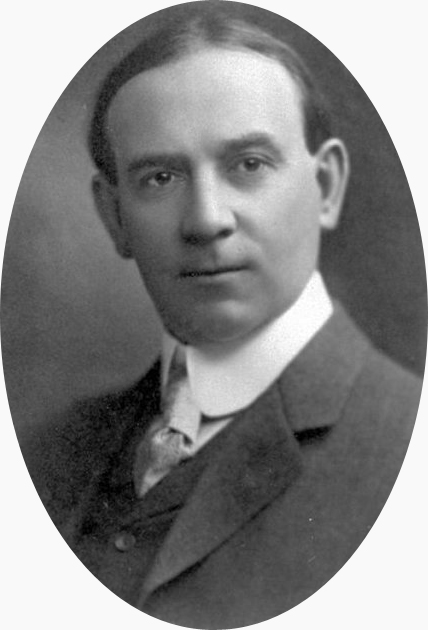

Member of the House of Commons of Canada
- In office October 29, 1925 – September 14, 1926
- Preceded by: New district
- Succeeded by: Donald Ferdinand Kellner
- Constituency: Athabaska

Member of the Legislative Assembly of Alberta
- In office March 25, 1913 – May 1925
- Preceded by: New district
- Succeeded by: Christopher Pattinson
- Constituency: Edson
- In office November 9, 1905 – June 7, 1917 Serving with John Alexander McDougall (1909–1913); Albert Ewing (1913–1917)
- Preceded by: New district
- Succeeded by: District abolished
- Constituency: Edmonton

Attorney-General of Alberta
- In office May 4, 1912 – August 23, 1918
- Preceded by: Charles R. Mitchell
- Succeeded by: John R. Boyle
- In office September 9, 1905 – June 1, 1910
- Preceded by: New position
- Succeeded by: Charles R. Mitchell

Personal details
- Born: November 30, 1872 Madoc, Ontario
- Died: June 2, 1928 (aged 55) Calgary, Alberta
- Party: Alberta Liberal Party, Liberal Party of Canada
- Spouse: Annie Louisa Lynde
- Children: One son, two daughters
- Education: University of Toronto, Osgoode Hall Law School
- Occupation: Lawyer

Charles Wilson Cross (November 30, 1872 – June 2, 1928) was a Canadian politician who served in the Legislative Assembly of Alberta and the House of Commons of Canada. He was also the first Attorney-General of Alberta. Born in Ontario, he studied law at Osgoode Hall Law School before coming west to practise in Edmonton. He became active with the Liberal Party of Canada, and when Alberta was created in 1905 he was chosen by Premier Alexander Cameron Rutherford to be its first Attorney-General. Implicated in the Alberta and Great Waterways Railway scandal, he resigned in 1910 along with the rest of Rutherford's government.

As a backbencher, he became the leader of Liberals opposed to the government of Rutherford's successor, Arthur Sifton, until Sifton re-appointed him Attorney-General in 1912. Cross served in this capacity under Sifton and his successor Charles Stewart until 1918, when Stewart fired him after receiving no response to his request for Cross's resignation. Cross remained in provincial politics until 1925, but in a radically diminished role. After leaving provincial politics, he was elected to the Canadian House of Commons, only to be defeated in his 1926 re-election bid. He died in 1928.

== Early life ==
Cross was born in Madoc, Ontario to merchant Thomas Cross and his wife, Marie Mouncey. He studied at Upper Canada College, the University of Toronto, and Osgoode Hall Law School. He moved west to Edmonton in 1897, where he opened a law practice with William Short; it exists today as Duncan Craig LLP. When the idea of creating one or more new provinces out of the Northwest Territories gained currency, Cross was one of three people selected by Edmonton City Council to travel to Ottawa and ensure that Edmonton's interests were respected.

== Provincial politics ==
=== Early provincial career ===
Cross was a Liberal, and fast established himself was one of the party's leading Edmonton lights. By some assessments, he was the second most influential Liberal in the city after Frank Oliver, the owner of the Edmonton Bulletin and local Member of Parliament. Once the decision was made to create the province of Alberta, the question emerged of who would govern it: the Northwest Territories were governed on a non-partisan basis by Premier Frederick W. A. G. Haultain, who was a Conservative in federal politics. Some Liberals, such as Peter Talbot, were amenable to Haultain's becoming the first Premier of Alberta, either as the head of a non-partisan government or one formed by a coalition of Liberals and Conservatives. Cross was not among them.

Cross's view prevailed, and Alberta's first Lieutenant-Governor, Liberal George Bulyea, invited Alexander Cameron Rutherford to form a government. Haultain went to Saskatchewan, created from a portion of the Northwest Territories at the same time as Alberta was, to lead the Provincial Rights Party. Though Cross was only 32, Rutherford named him to his cabinet as Alberta's first Attorney-General. In consequence, he was required to contest the 1905 election. He did so in the district of Edmonton, against Conservative William Antrobus Griesbach. Griesbach fought his campaign on the Liberal federal government's imposition on Alberta of a requirement to fund separate schools, an imposition to which older provinces were not subject. Cross won the election with such a margin that Griesbach lost his deposit.

One of the first questions considered by the new Legislative Assembly of Alberta was the choice of provincial capital. The terms of autonomy had made Edmonton the provisional capital, but there was a movement to make Calgary the permanent choice. This movement was led in the legislature by Minister of Public Works William Henry Cushing, Cross's cabinet colleague, who argued that it would be cheaper to build a legislature building in Calgary than in Edmonton and that Calgary was the economic centre of the province and therefore ought to be capital. Cross countered that Edmonton's history as capital of the Canadian fur trade and its geographic location close to the centre of the province gave it the stronger claim. Edmonton was eventually selected by a vote of 16 to 8. It would not be the last issue on which Cross and Cushing disagreed.

As Attorney-General, Cross was responsible for overseeing prosecutions. He was especially aggressive in his enforcement of the Sabbath Observance Act, which prohibited most business activities on Sundays. He also introduced new workers' compensation legislation, the highlight of which was making compensation automatic, rather than the result of a lawsuit by the injured worker. Though the bill addressed some of the labour movement's concerns, there remained many criticisms: it failed to fine employers responsible for workplace hazards, did not apply to injuries sustained while building or repairing buildings of less than 40 feet (12 m) in height, did not protect casual labourers, and limited compensation to a maximum of Can$1,500. In response to these concerns, Cross lowered the minimum building height to 30 feet (9.1 m) and raised the maximum compensation to $1,800. To assuage farm leaders, he also included an exemption for farm labour.

=== Railway scandal ===
Cross was re-elected in the 1909 election as one of two members elected in the newly expanded Edmonton district. Soon after, in February 1910, Cushing resigned from cabinet, stating that he disagreed with Rutherford's approach to railway policy and specifically with his actions regarding the Alberta and Great Waterways Railway (A&GW). The A&GW was one of several new railways to take advantage of the government's offer, made under considerable public pressure, of loan guarantees. Cushing and John R. Boyle attacked Rutherford's government, with the latter charging that the Deputy Attorney-General, S. B. Woods, had removed papers from the government's files on the A&GW. Cross denied these charges on his deputy's behalf. Boyle followed with a motion that the assets of the A&GW, which he believed was taking advantage of the government's guarantees to build a sub-standard railway at government expense, be expropriated. Cross led the government's opposition to the motion.

On March 9, Cross abruptly resigned as Attorney-General; Woods resigned the next day. Cross gave as his reason that Rutherford had told him that Cushing was re-entering cabinet, and Cross felt that that made his position untenable. Cushing gave a different account: he said that he had been asked by Rutherford to re-enter cabinet, and that the Premier had told him that if he did, Cross would resign. However, he denied ever having agreed to do so, and accused Cross of fabricating his story completely. Rutherford stayed silent until March 11, when he announced that he had refused Cross's resignation, and that he was still Attorney-General. Soon after, Boyle made his own set of accusations, saying that agents of the liquor license department, which was under Cross, had been demanding bribes from hoteliers in exchange for licenses and that Cross was aware of this. Cross denied the charge.

The crisis divided the Liberal Party into two camps: the pro-government Liberals, led by Cross and Rutherford, and the insurgent Liberals, led by Cushing and Boyle. The insurgents' objective was to replace Rutherford with Cushing. Though most important Liberals outside the legislature, including Bulyea and Oliver, lacked confidence in Rutherford, they had little more in Cushing. Some newspapers characterized the struggle as the visible element of a battle for influence between Oliver, long Alberta's most prominent Liberal, and Cross, seen as its rising star. Though Rutherford never actually lost a confidence motion, Bulyea pressured him to resign in favour of Arthur Sifton, the province's chief justice. Several of Cross's supporters attempted to extract a promise to keep Cross as Attorney-General in exchange for their support of Sifton's government, but Sifton was unwilling to agree. Rutherford eventually and reluctantly complied with Bulyea's wishes, and the rest of his government, including Cross, followed suit. Subsequent rumours suggested that Cross and his followers had agreed to resign only because of a belief that Sifton would be appointed to the Supreme Court of Canada after approximately a year as Premier, with Cross then being asked to form a government. A subsequent commission declined to find Cross guilty of wrongdoing in relation to the A&GW incident, but criticized him and Rutherford for granting over-generous terms to the railway.

=== Backbenches and return to cabinet ===
In keeping with Sifton's policy of excluding all prominent players in the A&GW affair from cabinet, Cross was not re-appointed (Cushing, Rutherford, and Boyle were also left out). Despite this, Cross declared his support for Sifton's government while restating his admiration for Rutherford's. In response to the A&GW's default of its obligations to the government, Sifton introduced a bill confiscating the money the A&GW had raised through the sale of government-guaranteed bonds. Cross, still a supporter of building the A&GW and concerned that the bill did not include a commitment to use the money to do so, opposed it. The bill passed, but was disallowed by the courts. Sifton, left with little choice but to use the money for the purpose for which it had been raised, announced a new policy of railway construction. At the same time, he invited Cross to resume his post as Attorney-General. Boyle was also admitted to cabinet, as Minister of Education; Cushing and Rutherford, the other major players in the A&GW affair, had withdrawn from the limelight, and neither would return to the legislature after the 1913 election. Cross accepted Sifton's offer, telling the public that Sifton's new railway policy "made it proper for me to support and join his government".

In keeping with custom at the time, once appointed to cabinet Cross resigned his seat in the legislature and contested it in a by-election. His by-election was held at the same time as four others, and while Liberal papers were unhesitant about endorsing the Liberal candidates in those, in Edmonton they gave Cross a somewhat bumpier ride. The Calgary Albertan, in an editorial advocating the return of Liberal candidates in all five by-elections, criticized Cross as "disloyal to [Sifton] in the beginning, and doubtless will be to the end." The Edmonton Bulletin, still owned by Oliver, complained that while in the other four by-elections voters were being asked to judge Sifton's government, in Edmonton it appeared that they were being asked to judge Rutherford's. Cross defeated his main opponent, Conservative Albert Ewing, but by a much smaller margin than he had managed in 1905 and 1909. Ewing claimed electoral fraud and appealed the outcome to the courts, but the 1913 election pre-empted his appeal. In that election, perhaps recalling the narrowness of his by-election win, Cross ran in two ridings, Edmonton and Edson. He won both (Ewing was the second victor from the two-member Edmonton district), making him the only person in Alberta history to represent two constituencies at the same time (though not the only one to try: Sifton also did so in 1913, and Boyle would in 1921). The Edmonton contest was a close contest and only after several recounts was Cross declared a winner.

Prohibition was gaining currency in Alberta: the Conservatives had included it in their 1913 platform, and it was supported by the increasingly powerful United Farmers of Alberta (UFA). The government generally opposed the idea, and Cross held up Manitoba as example of its failures. But the government had also (at the UFA's behest) introduced direct democracy measures, one of which allowed citizens to initiate plebiscites. The well-organized temperance movement did so on prohibition, which was endorsed by a majority of voters in the ensuing plebiscite; the legislature passed the Prohibition Act in the spring of 1916. As Attorney-General, Cross was responsible for enforcing it.

=== Conscription and the Stewart cabinet ===
In 1917, the Alberta Liberal Party, held delicately together since 1910, burst once again into conflict with the conscription crisis. The Conservative federal government of Robert Borden supported imposing conscription to help win World War I, and most of English Canada supported him. The Liberal leader, Wilfrid Laurier, opposed conscription, but many of the party's English-speaking members supported it and defected to a Borden-led Union government. This dispute had repercussions in the Alberta party: Sifton supported conscription, and shortly after winning the 1917 election (in which Cross was re-elected in Edson but did not run in Edmonton) resigned as Premier to move to federal politics and a ministry in Borden's government. Cross opposed conscription. In this he was joined by Oliver, and the two put aside years of animosity to campaign together for Laurier in the 1917 federal election. Cross regarded Laurier as something of a hero, and proclaimed that he was "fairly convinced that the first duty of Canadians to their country is to get rid of the crowd of profiteers at Ottawa who have brought the country to its present condition."

Sifton's successor as Premier was Charles Stewart, the Minister of Public Works in his cabinet. Stewart, who supported conscription but did not actively campaign for it or the Unionists, kept Cross as Attorney-General, despite rumours that he would not. Cross's major challenge was enforcing prohibition, which was proving challenging. The Conservatives, and in particular George Douglas Stanley, were unreluctant to accuse Cross of mismanagement. In the meantime, a rift was opening between Cross and Stewart (whom the Conservatives accused, somewhat ironically, of being unduly influenced by his Attorney-General). Stewart found Cross neglectful of his duties, and after Cross refused to dismiss two detectives from his department whose work Stewart felt could be better done by the Alberta Provincial Police, Stewart requested his resignation. When twelve days passed without a reply from Cross, Stewart fired him August 26, 1918. His replacement as Attorney-General was Boyle, his nemesis of the Alberta and Great Waterways era.

Cross remained in the legislature for several more years, but took no active role in its proceedings, and soon ceased to be regarded as a major force. He was re-elected in the 1921 election, making him and Boyle the only veterans of the first legislature still in office. The UFA, fielding candidates for the first time, won a majority of seats in the election, and Stewart resigned as Premier. Cross continued his indifferent performance as MLA until May 1925, when he resigned to enter federal politics.

== Federal career and later life ==
Cross ran as a Liberal in the 1925 federal election in the riding of Athabaska, and defeated Donald Ferdinand Kellner, the Progressive incumbent from Edmonton East. Stewart, who had also left provincial politics, was elected in the adjacent Edmonton West. The Liberals, under incumbent Prime Minister William Lyon Mackenzie King, won fewer seats than the Conservatives, but King decided to remain as Prime Minister anyway. As a result, Cross sat in the House of Commons of Canada throughout the King-Byng Affair. In the ensuing 1926 election, Cross was soundly defeated in a rematch with Kellner. Charles Wilson Cross died of a heart attack June 2, 1928, in Calgary.

== Electoral record ==
1926 Canadian federal election: Athabaska
Party	Candidate	Votes	%	±%
United Farmers of Alberta	Donald Ferdinand Kellner	4,870	63.74	–
Liberal	Charles Wilson Cross	2,770	36.26	–17.94
Total valid votes		7,640	99.14	
Total rejected ballots		66	0.86	+0.08
Turnout		7,706	46.10	–5.45
Eligible voters/turnout		16,715		
United Farmers of Alberta gain from Liberal		Swing		+63.74
Source: Library of Parliament

1925 Canadian federal election: Athabaska
Party	Candidate	Votes	%	±%
Liberal	Charles Wilson Cross	5,078	54.20	–
Progressive	Donald Ferdinand Kellner	3,648	38.94	–
Conservative	Charles Jenry Gauvreau	643	6.86	–
Total valid votes		9,369	99.23	
Total rejected ballots		73	0.77	
Turnout		9,442	51.55	
Eligible voters/turnout		18,316		
Liberal notional gain from		Swing		–
Source: Library of Parliament

1921 Alberta general election results (Edson)		Turnout N.A.	
Affiliation	Candidate	Votes	%
Liberal	Charles Wilson Cross	1,321	57.94%
Labour	John Diamond	959	42.06%
1917 Alberta general election results (Edson)		Turnout N.A.	
Affiliation	Candidate	Votes	%
Liberal	Charles Wilson Cross	1,116	62.91%
Conservative	J. R. McIntosh	455	25.65%
Socialist	John Reid	203	11.44%
1913 Alberta general election results (Edson)		Turnout N.A.	
Affiliation	Candidate	Votes	%
Liberal	Charles Wilson Cross	671	51.03%
Conservative	H. H. Verge	644	48.97%
1913 Alberta general election results (Edmonton) (two candidates elected)		Turnout N.A.	
Affiliation	Candidate	Votes	%
Liberal	Charles Wilson Cross	5,407	27.83%
Conservative	Albert Ewing	5,107	26.29%
Liberal	Alexander Grant MacKay	4,913	25.29%
Conservative	William Antrobus Griesbach	4,499	23.16%
Independent	J. D. Blayney	643	3.31%
1912 by-election results (Edmonton)		Turnout N.A.	
Affiliation	Candidate	Votes	%
Liberal	Charles Wilson Cross	1,802	48.47%
Conservative	Albert Ewing	1,733	46.61%
Socialist	J. R. Knight	183	4.92%
1909 Alberta general election results (Edmonton) (two candidates elected)		Turnout N.A.	
Affiliation	Candidate	Votes	%
Liberal	Charles Wilson Cross	3,282	40.01%
Liberal	John Alexander McDougall	2,977	36.30%
Conservative	Albert Ewing	1,595	19.45%
Independent	John Gailbraith	348	4.24%
1905 Alberta general election results (Edmonton)		Turnout N.A.	
Affiliation	Candidate	Votes	%
Liberal	Charles Wilson Cross	1,209	70.09%
Conservative	William Antrobus Griesbach	516	29.91%
