= Beattie Martin =

Canadian surgeon (1890–1958)

Robert Jackson Beattie Martin (September 23, 1890 – December 2, 1958) was a Canadian surgeon and sportsman who was president of the Saskatchewan Roughriders and namesake of the Dr. Beattie Martin Trophy.

== Early life ==
Martin born in Exeter, Ontario, to Rev. William M. and Christina (Jamieson) Martin. One of his brothers was Chief Justice and Premier of Saskatchewan, William Melville Martin. He graduated from the University of Western Ontario in 1915 and joined the Royal Canadian Army Medical Corps. He was later transferred to the British Army and in 1917, while serving with the British in Palestine, Martin was awarded the Military Cross for attending to wounded soldiers while under very heavy machine gun fire.

== Medicine ==
Following his discharge in 1918, Martin specialized in orthopedics at the Mayo Clinic. In 1922, he moved to Regina, Saskatchewan, and practiced with Dr. Hugh McLean before going into private practice. In 1926, he and Dr. D. S. Johnstone amputated a patient's leg while she was still conscious because she suffered from a heart condition that made the doctors decide against using an ordinary anesthetic. He rejoined the RCAMC in 1941 and served overseas during World War II. He was discharged in 1944 and became a part-time orthopedic surgeon for the Regina branch of Department of Pensions and National Health. Martin and 15 other doctors founded the Medical Arts Clinic.

== Sports ==
Martin became an executive with the Saskatchewan Roughriders in 1921 and was a team doctor for over 30 years. He served as team president in 1954 and 1955. He was also president of the Regina Victorias from 1925 to 1926, 1927 to 1928, and 1931 to 1933 and served as president of the Saskatchewan Fish and Game League.

== Personal life ==
In 1929, Martin married Mildred Spooner of Regina. They had one son - Gordon Beattie Martin and one daughter – Frances Joanne (Martin) Froggatt. The family resided in Regina and had a summer home on Waskesiu Lake. Martin was a member of the Liberal Party of Saskatchewan and the First Presbyterian Church in Regina.

In 1938, Martin was hurled 15 feet and suffered burns on his hands in a gasoline explosion on a friend's farm. He was released from the hospital on July 15 and recovered in time to take part in the provincial medical convention at Prince Albert National Park the following week.

Martin died of a heart attack on December 2, 1958, at his home in Regina.
