= Donald Ferdinand Kellner =

Canadian politician

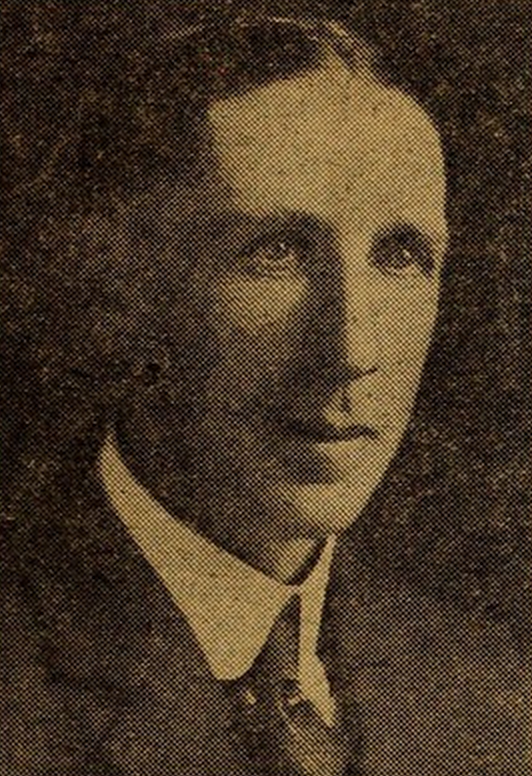

Member of Parliament for Edmonton East
- In office 1921–1925
- Preceded by: Henry Arthur Mackie
- Succeeded by: Ambrose Bury

Member of Parliament for Athabaska
- In office 1926–1930
- Preceded by: Charles Wilson Cross
- Succeeded by: John Francis Buckley

Personal details
- Born: September 15, 1879 Ethel, Ontario, Canada
- Died: April 1, 1935 (aged 55) Edmonton, Alberta, Canada
- Party: Progressive Party of Canada; United Farmers of Alberta

Donald Ferdinand Kellner (September 15, 1879 – April 1, 1935) was a politician from Alberta, Canada.

Kellner was elected as a Progressive/UFA candidate to the House of Commons of Canada in the 1921 Canadian federal election in the Edmonton East. He defeated Joseph Clarke and incumbent Henry Arthur Mackie in a 3-way race to serve his first term in office.

Kellner switched to the new Athabaska district in the 1925 Canadian federal election. Kellner was defeated by former Alberta Liberal MLA Charles Cross. A year later, in the 1926 Canadian federal election running for the UFA again, he defeated Cross.

Kellner was defeated by John Francis Buckley iwhen he ran for re-election in the 1930 Canadian federal election in the Athabaska district.
