= Harry Butcher (politician) =

Canadian politician

Member of Parliament for Last Mountain
- In office July 1930 – August 1935
- Preceded by: William Russell Fansher
- Succeeded by: riding dissolved

Personal details
- Born: 15 December 1873 Greenwich, England
- Died: 29 December 1956 (aged 83)
- Party: Liberal
- Profession: barrister

Harry Butcher (15 December 1873 – 29 December 1956) was a Liberal party member of the House of Commons of Canada. He was born in Greenwich, England and became a barrister.

Butcher moved from the United Kingdom to Canada in 1904. He attended private schools in England, then studied at the University of Manchester from which he received his Bachelor of Laws degree.

From 1920 to 1930, he served as chair of the Punnichy, Saskatchewan school board.

He was elected to Parliament at the Last Mountain riding in the 1930 general election after a previous unsuccessful campaign there in the 1925 federal election. After serving his only House of Commons term, the 17th Canadian Parliament, Butcher left federal politics and did not seek re-election in the 1935 vote.
