= Henry Butcher =

Henry Butcher may refer to:

- Samuel Butcher (classicist) ((Samuel) Henry Butcher), Anglo-Irish classicist and Unionist MP
- Hank Butcher, American baseball player

== See also ==
- Harry Butcher (disambiguation)
