= Henry Arthur Mackie =

Canadian politician

Member of Parliament for Edmonton East
- In office 1917–1921
- Preceded by: none
- Succeeded by: Donald Ferdinand Kellner

Personal details
- Born: January 17, 1878 Cookshire, Quebec, Canada
- Died: November 16, 1945 (aged 67) Edmonton, Alberta, Canada
- Party: Unionist

Henry Arthur Mackie (January 17, 1878 – November 16, 1945) was a politician from Alberta, Canada. He was born to a Scottish and French Canadian family in Cookshire, Quebec.

Mackie was elected to the House of Commons of Canada in the 1917 Canadian federal election as a member of the Unionist coalition in the brand new electoral district of Edmonton East. He defeated Laurier Liberal candidate Alexander Esson May to win the riding.

Mackie was defeated running under the Conservative banner in the subsequent federal election in 1921 by Progressive Party of Canada candidate Donald Ferdinand Kellner. He finished a distant 3rd place behind Joseph Clarke.
