= John Francis Buckley =

Canadian politician

Member of Parliament for Athabaska
- In office 1930–1931
- Preceded by: Donald Ferdinand Kellner
- Succeeded by: Percy Griffith Davies

Personal details
- Born: November 26, 1891 Butte, Montana, U.S.
- Died: November 27, 1931 (aged 40) St. Paul, Alberta, Canada
- Party: Liberal Party of Canada

John Francis Buckley (November 26, 1891 – November 27, 1931) was a barrister, soldier, and Canadian federal politician, born in Butte, Montana.

Buckley served in World War I with the Princess Patricia's Canadian Light Infantry from 1915 to 1918.

Buckley ran for the House of Commons of Canada and was elected in the 1930 Canadian federal election. He defeated Incumbent Donald Ferdinand Kellner in a close 3-way race. A year into his term, Buckley died in a car accident at St. Paul, Alberta when his vehicle struck a team of horses pulling a carriage.
