= John Archibald Maharg =

Canadian politician and farm leader

John Archibald Maharg MLA
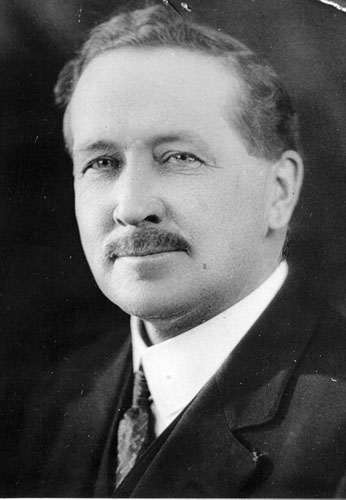

Leader of the Opposition (Saskatchewan)
- In office 1923–1923
- Preceded by: Donald Maclean
- Succeeded by: Harris Turner

Personal details
- Born: February 2, 1872 Orangeville, Ontario, Canada
- Died: November 23, 1944 (aged 72)
- Party: Independent (supportive of Progressives)

John Archibald Maharg (February 2, 1872 – November 23, 1944) was a Saskatchewan politician.

Born in Orangeville, Ontario, Maharg moved west and settled near Moose Jaw in 1890 where he became a grain farmer and cattle breeder. He helped organize the Saskatchewan Grain Growers Association becoming its first president from 1910 to 1923. The SGGA obtained loans from the government to build grain elevators and formed the Saskatchewan Co-operative Elevator Company with Maharg as founding president. He also served as president of the Canadian Council of Agriculture from 1915 to 1917.

Maharg entered politics and was elected as the Member of Parliament representing Maple Creek in the House of Commons of Canada as a Unionist. In 1919 he crossed the floor to join Thomas Crerar and other MPs to form the populist Progressive Party of Canada.

In 1921, Meharg was recruited by Premier William Melville Martin to join the Liberal government of Saskatchewan as Minister of Agriculture. He did not join the Liberal Party, however, and was elected to the Saskatchewan legislature as an Independent in the 1921 general election for the district of Morse.

A political crisis developed when Premier Martin campaigned for the federal Liberal Party of Canada against a Progressive candidate in Regina, thus angering the Saskatchewan Grain Growers Association which had backed the Progressive candidate. Martin declared his opposition to a number of Progressive policies during the campaign leading Maharg, a Progressive supporter, to declare that the Premier had acted in bad faith and resign from Cabinet in protest. The split in the Martin Cabinet led to the Premier's resignation and his replacement by Charles Dunning. Maharg served as Leader of the Opposition until leaving politics in 1924.

Following his political career Maharg returned to farming and also served as the Co-operative Elevator Company's representative on the provisional board of the newly formed Saskatchewan Wheat Pool.

== See also ==
- Progressive Party of Saskatchewan
