= Last Mountain (federal electoral district) =

Former federal electoral district in Saskatchewan, Canada

Last Mountain was a federal electoral district in Saskatchewan, Canada, that was represented in the House of Commons of Canada from 1917 to 1935. This riding was created in 1914 from parts of Humboldt, Regina and Saskatoon ridings

It was abolished in 1933 when it was redistributed into Lake Centre, Melville and Yorkton ridings.

== Election results ==
1917 Canadian federal election
| Party | Candidate | Votes |
|---|---|---|
| Government (Unionist) | JOHNSTON, John Frederick | acclaimed |

1921 Canadian federal election
| Party | Candidate | Votes |
|---|---|---|
| Progressive | JOHNSTON, John Frederick | 11,024 |
| Conservative | THOMPSON, Thomas Frederick | 1,553 |

1925 Canadian federal election
| Party | Candidate | Votes |
|---|---|---|
| Progressive | FANSHER, William Russell | 3,359 |
| Liberal | BUTCHER, Harry | 3,269 |
| Conservative | MATTHEWSON, John Walter | 1,596 |

1926 Canadian federal election
| Party | Candidate | Votes |
|---|---|---|
| Progressive | FANSHER, William Russell | 5,080 |
| Liberal | MACFARLANE, William Anderson | 4,890 |

1930 Canadian federal election
| Party | Candidate | Votes |
|---|---|---|
| Liberal | BUTCHER, Harry | 5,087 |
| Progressive | FANSHER, William Russell | 4,250 |
| Conservative | MINOR, Harold J. | 3,563 |

== See also ==
- List of Canadian electoral districts
- Historical federal electoral districts of Canada
