= Percy Griffith Davies =

Canadian politician

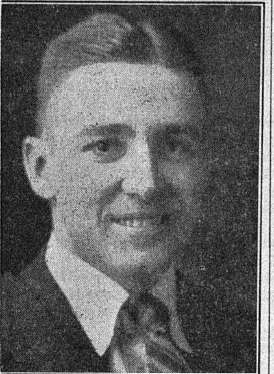

Member of Parliament for Athabaska
- In office 1932–1935
- Preceded by: John Francis Buckley
- Succeeded by: Percy John Rowe

Personal details
- Born: October 29, 1902 Edmonton, Alberta
- Died: January 26, 1992 (aged 89) Edmonton, Alberta
- Party: Conservative Party of Canada
- Profession: barrister

Percy Griffith Davies, QC (October 29, 1902 – January 26, 1992) was a barrister and a Canadian federal politician.

Davies ran in a by-election after the death of incumbent John Francis Buckley on March 21, 1932. He won the hotly contested election and came out on top of a field of 4 candidates. Davies served out his term and did not run again in 1935.
