= Franklin White Turnbull =

Canadian politician

Member of Parliament for Regina
- In office July 1930 – October 1935
- Preceded by: Charles Avery Dunning
- Succeeded by: riding dissolved

Personal details
- Born: Franklin White Turnbull; 19 June 1881 Carleton County, Ontario
- Died: 24 February 1971 (aged 89)
- Party: Conservative
- Spouse(s): Margaret C. Suedden m. 22 August 1911
- Profession: barrister

Franklin White Turnbull (19 June 1881 – 24 February 1971) was a Conservative member of the House of Commons of Canada. He was born in Carleton County, Ontario and became a barrister.

Turnbull attended schools at Vankleek Hill, Ontario, Edmonton, and Springhill, Ontario (secondary school number 8). He studied law with F.W.A.G. Haultain in Regina, Saskatchewan.

He was first elected to Parliament at the Regina riding in the 1930 general election after a previous unsuccessful campaign there in the 1925 election. Riding changes meant that Turnbull became a candidate at the new Regina City riding for the 1935 election, but was defeated by Donald McNiven of the Liberal party.
