= Bogarttown, Ontario =

Bogarttown
- Unincorporated community
- Interactive map of Bogarttown
- Coordinates: 44°2′42″N 79°25′28″W
- Country: Canada
- Province: Ontario
- Regional municipality: York
- Town: Newmarket
- Time zone: UTC-5 (EST)
  - Summer (DST): UTC-4 (EDT)
- Area codes: 905 and 289
- NTS Map: 031D03
- GNBC Code: FDJIE

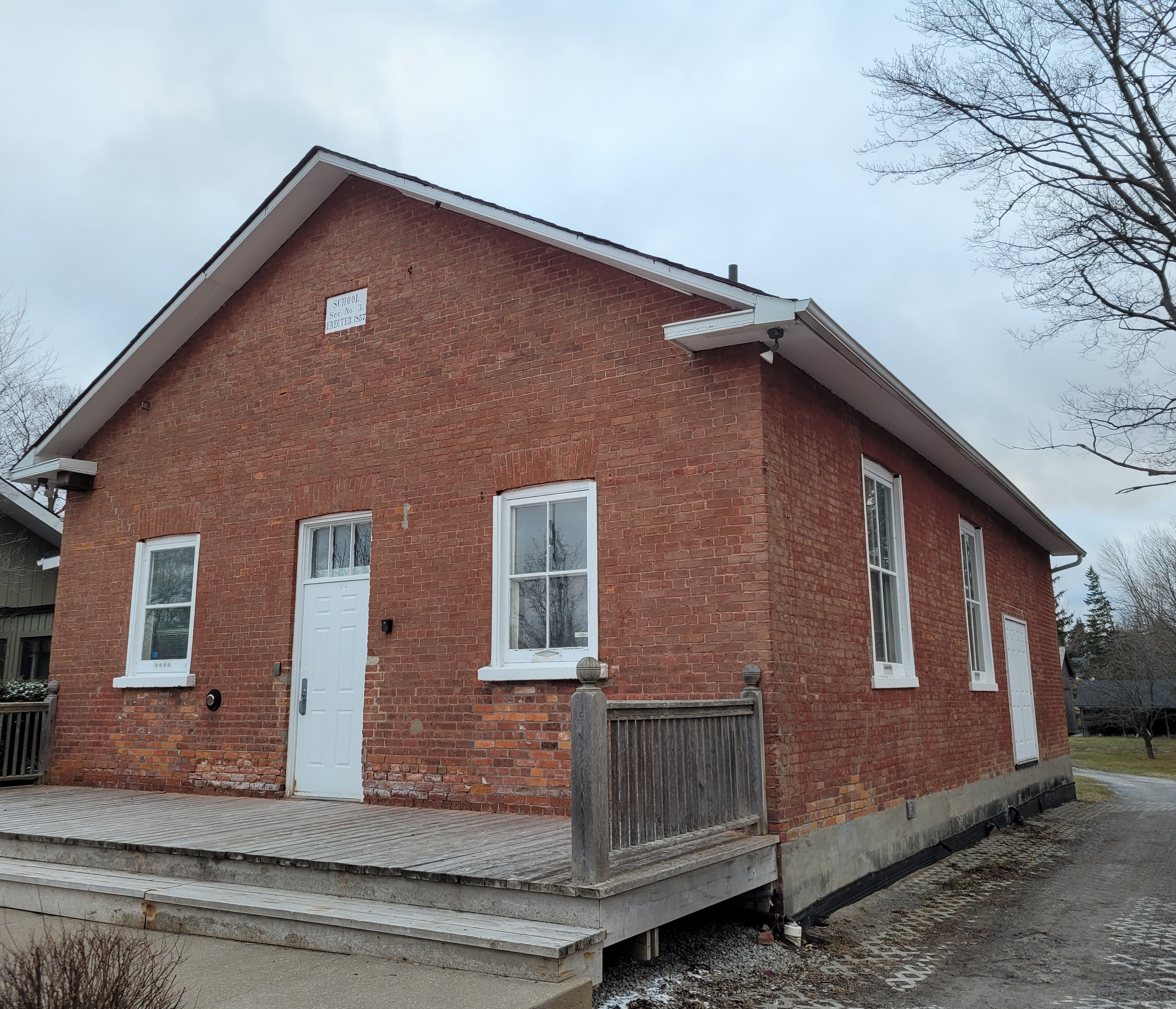
The Bogarttown Schoolhouse

Bogarttown /ˈboʊɡərtaʊn/ is a community located at Mulock Drive and Leslie Street between Bayview Avenue and Woodbine Avenue in York Region, Ontario, Canada. Formerly a distinct rural hamlet, it is now a part of the Town of Newmarket, Ontario both administratively (since 1970) and more recently geographically owing to sprawling suburban development. The name is occasionally seen misspelled as Bogartown.

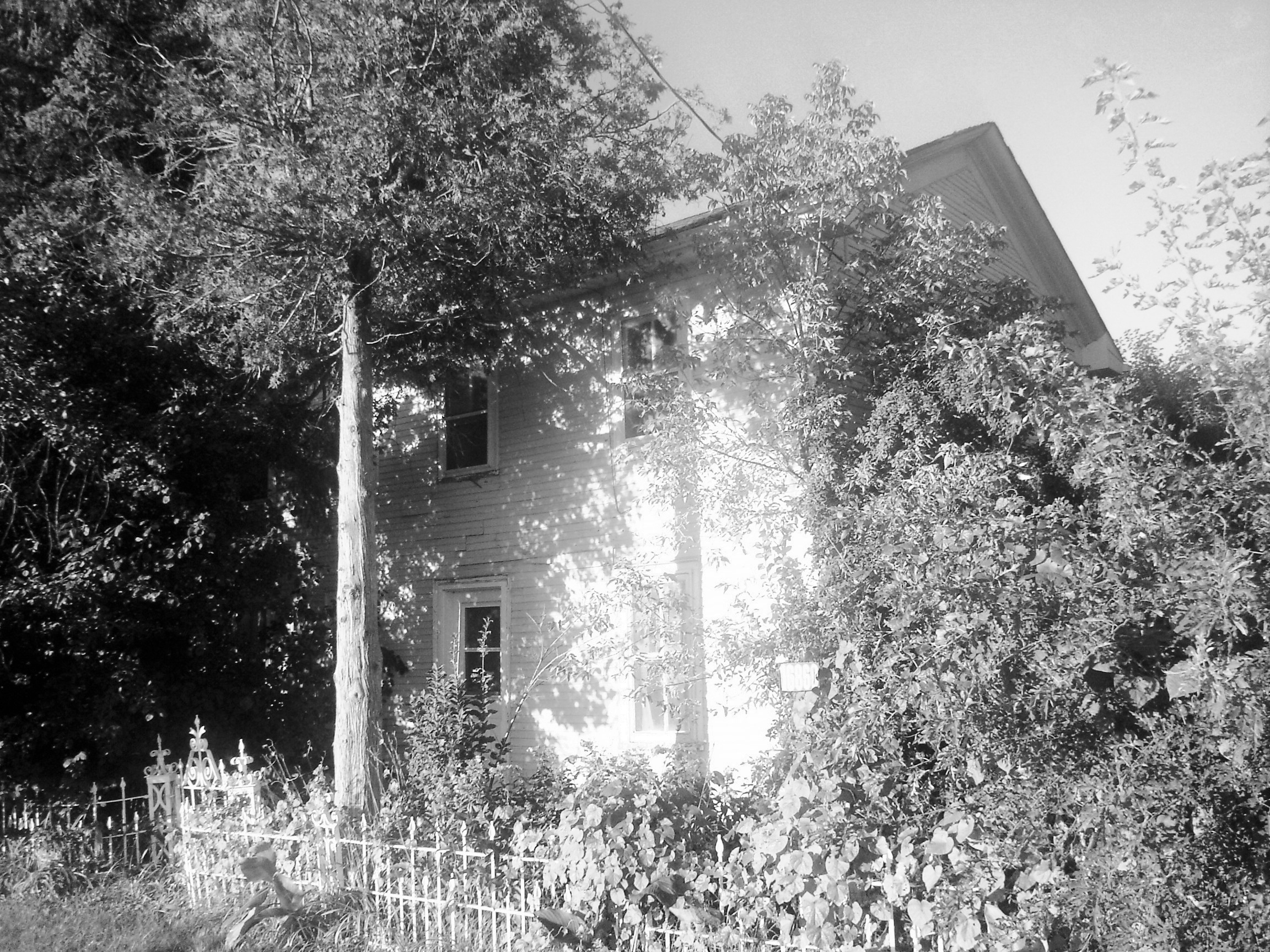
The John Bogart House as it appears in 2012.

In 1805 John Bogart (1756-1842) built a sawmill at the corner of what is now Mulock and Leslie. Bogart was originally from Pennsylvania and descendants of arrivals to America in Bedford (now Brooklyn, New York) in 1663. In following years (they arrived in 1801) a grist mill (1806) and woollen mill (1808) were added and a small community grew up around them. The John Bogart House at 16680 Leslie Street was built in 1811 and abandoned since 2011. Bogart Pond is still there, though now surrounded by homes and condominiums, and the former community of Bogarttown has now all but been swallowed up by the rapid expansion of Newmarket.

The "Bogarttown Curve" was a locally known highway curve on the northeast corner of Mulock Drive and Leslie Street - the ambition of many local teenagers was to see what speed they could achieve around this curve. It was immortalized in song in 1995 by Andrew Walker in the song Bogarttown Curve performed by The Mummble Ducks. The Bogarttown curve and a corresponding curve at the intersection of Vivian Road and Woodbine Avenue (the "Pleasantville Curve") were installed to improve traffic flow in the 1960s, but removed as the intersections were upgraded again in the late 1990s and the traffic load on Woodbine Avenue fell dramatically when the 404 reached Mulock drive. The Bogarttown curve was for sale for development in 2005.

The Bogarttown schoolhouse (built in 1857 and believed to be the oldest brick schoolhouse in the province) became the original site of the Whitchurch-Stouffville Museum in 1971, but was moved to the community of Vandorf, Ontario after expropriation in 1978 for the construction of Highway 404. The actual Highway 404 extension was not completed until 1989 and now passes directly over the school's former location.

Bogarttown never grew into a large town, most likely because it was bypassed by the railway in the 1850s, unlike Newmarket.

Nearby Bogart Public School was named in honour of John Bogart and this pioneer community.
