= Regina (federal electoral district) =

Former federal electoral district in Saskatchewan, Canada

Regina was a federal electoral district in Saskatchewan, Canada, that was represented in the House of Commons of Canada from 1908 to 1935. This riding was created in 1907 from parts of the former Northwest Territories ridings Assiniboia West and Qu'Appelle ridings. It initially consisted of a part of Saskatchewan stretching from the south boundary of the province.

The riding was abolished in 1933 when it was redistributed into Lake Centre, Qu'Appelle, and Regina City ridings.

== Election results ==
1908 Canadian federal election
Party	Candidate	Votes
Liberal	MARTIN, William Melville	4,304
Conservative	WILKINSON, Thomas	3,544

1911 Canadian federal election
Party	Candidate	Votes
Liberal	MARTIN, William Melville	5,811
Conservative	COWAN, Walter Davy	4,081
Independent	FLETCHER, Richard	745

1917 Canadian federal election
Party	Candidate	Votes
Government (Unionist)	COWAN, Walter Davy	10,563
Opposition (Laurier Liberals)	MACBETH, Andrew	2,599

1921 Canadian federal election
Party	Candidate	Votes
Liberal	MOTHERWELL, William Richard	7,786
Conservative	MACPHERSON, Murdock Alexander	6,008
Progressive	MACLEAN, Hugh	3,547

By-election: On Mr. Motherwell's acceptance of an office of emolument under the Crown, 3 January 1922

By-election on 19 January 1922
Party	Candidate	Votes
Liberal	MOTHERWELL, Hon. William Richard	acclaimed

1925 Canadian federal election
Party	Candidate	Votes
Liberal	DARKE, Francis Nicholson	7,478
Conservative	TURNBULL, Franklin White	5,399
Progressive	COLDWELL, Major James	2,284

By-election: On Mr. Darke's resignation, 20 February 1926 to create a vacancy for C.A. Dunning

By-election on 16 March 1926
Party	Candidate	Votes
Liberal	DUNNING, Hon. Charles Avery	acclaimed

1926 Canadian federal election
Party	Candidate	Votes
Liberal	DUNNING, Hon. Charles Avery	8,916
Conservative	MACKINNON, Andrew G.	8,001

By-election: On Mr. Dunning's acceptance of an office of emolument under the Crown, 5 October 1926

By-election on 2 November 1926
Party	Candidate	Votes
Liberal	DUNNING, Hon. Charles Avery	acclaimed

1930 Canadian federal election
Party	Candidate	Votes
Conservative	TURNBULL, Franklin White	14,446
Liberal	DUNNING, Hon. Charles Avery	10,746
Independent	CARMAN, Lt. Col. R.A.	82

== See also ==
- List of Canadian electoral districts
- Historical federal electoral districts of Canada
