= William Russell Fansher =

Canadian politician

William Russell Fansher (February 26, 1876 – February 28, 1957) was a farmer and political figure in Saskatchewan, Canada. He represented Last Mountain in the House of Commons of Canada from 1925 to 1930 as a Progressive Party member.

He was born in Florence, Ontario, the son of Franklin Fansher and Lucy McLellan. In 1904, he married Mary Alice Dorcas Osborne. Later that year, he moved to Regina, Saskatchewan, where he operated the city's light plant. In 1906, he settled on a farm near Govan, Saskatchewan. Fansher was involved in the formation of the Saskatchewan Wheat Pool, the local rural telephone company and the Govan credit union and co-op store. He raised cattle and was called "Canada's Clover King" by Maclean's magazine. Fansher was defeated when he ran for reelection in 1930, 1935 and 1940. He died in Regina at the age of 81.

His brother Burt also served in the House of Commons.
