= Walter Davy Cowan =

Canadian politician

Walter Davy Cowan, D.D.S., (31 December 1865 – 28 September 1934) was a Canadian politician in Saskatchewan and Ku Klux Klan member. Cowan served as Mayor of Regina and served as Conservative-Unionist Member of Parliament for Regina from 1917 to 1921 and then as the Conservative MP for Long Lake from 1930 until his death.

A dentist by profession, Cowan was born in Guelph, Canada West, to Scottish immigrants. After his early schooling in Guelph, Cowan attended the University of Maryland, graduating with a degree in dentistry in 1888.

In 1889, he moved to Regina in what was then the Northwest Territories and was one of the first dentists in the region. He organized the first dental association in Canada, the Dental College of the Northwest Territories (later the Dental College of Saskatchewan) and served as its president until 1913.

In 1890, Dr. Cowan was elected to the town council and served for one year. In 1891, he became associated editor of the Dominion Dental Journal. He helped form the National Dental Association in 1904 and served as the organization's president.

Cowan ran for parliament in the 1911 federal election as a Conservative; however, he was defeated in the Regina electoral district.

Cowan was elected Mayor of Regina in 1916 and held that office for two years, deciding not to run for a third term after he was elected to the House of Commons of Canada in the 1917 federal election as a Unionist MP supporting the wartime government of Sir Robert Borden. He did not run for re-election in the 1921 federal election.

He also served during World War I as commanding officer of the Dental Corps, District No.12, with the rank of major.

Cowan returned to the House of Commons after being elected as the Conservative MP for Long Lake in the 1930 federal election. During this time, he was also the provincial treasurer ("Klabee") for the Saskatchewan chapter of the Ku Klux Klan. He died in office in 1934.

In 1918, Cowan published a book on post-war reconstruction called After Hell, what?.
