= 7th Canadian Parliament =

1891–96 national legislative term

- Majority parliament
- Apr. 25, 1891 – Apr. 24, 1896

Parliament leaders
- Prime minister: Rt. Hon. Sir John A. Macdonald; Oct. 17, 1878 – Jun. 6, 1891
- The Hon. Sir John Joseph Caldwell Abbott; Jun. 16, 1891 – Nov. 24, 1892
- Rt. Hon. John Sparrow David Thompson; Dec. 5, 1892 – Dec. 12, 1894
- The Hon. Sir Mackenzie Bowell; Dec. 21, 1894 – Apr. 27, 1896
- Cabinets: 3rd Canadian Ministry; 4th Canadian Ministry; 5th Canadian Ministry; 6th Canadian Ministry
- Leader of the Opposition: Sir Wilfrid Laurier; 23 June 1887 – 10 June 1896

Party caucuses
- Government: Conservative Party & Liberal-Conservative
- Opposition: Liberal Party

House of Commons
- Seating arrangements of the House of Commons
- Speaker of the Commons: Joseph-Aldric Ouimet; 13 July 1887 – 28 July 1891
- Peter White; 29 July 1891 – 18 August 1896
- Members: 215 MP seats List of members

Senate
- Speaker of the Senate: The Hon. Sir Alexandre Lacoste; 27 April 1891 – 13 September 1891
- The Hon. John Jones Ross; 14 September 1891 – 12 July 1896
- Government Senate leader: John Joseph Caldwell Abbott; 16 June 1891 – 30 October 1893
- Sir Mackenzie Bowell; 31 October 1893 – 12 December 1894
- Sir Mackenzie Bowell; 21 December 1894 – 27 April 1896
- Opposition Senate leader: Sir Richard William Scott; 8 October 1878 – 27 April 1896
- Senators: 81 senator seats List of senators

Sovereign
- Monarch: Victoria; 1 July 1867 – 22 Jan. 1901
- Governor general: The Earl of Derby; 11 June 1888 – 18 Sep. 1893
- The Earl of Aberdeen; 18 Sep. 1893 – 12 Nov. 1898

Sessions
- 1st session 29 April 1891 – 30 September 1891
- 2nd session 25 February 1892 – 9 July 1892
- 3rd session 26 January 1893 – 1 April 1893
- 4th session 15 March 1894 – 23 July 1894
- 5th session 18 April 1895 – 22 July 1895
- 6th session 2 January 1896 – 23 April 1896
| ← 6th | → 8th |

The 7th Canadian Parliament was in session from April 29, 1891, until April 24, 1896 (4 years and 360 days). The membership was set by the 1891 federal election on March 5, 1891. It was dissolved prior to the 1896 election.

It was controlled by a Conservative/Liberal-Conservative majority first under Prime Minister Sir John A. Macdonald and the 3rd Canadian Ministry, and then by Sir John Abbott and the 4th Canadian Ministry, Sir John Thompson and the 5th Canadian Ministry, Sir Mackenzie Bowell and the 6th Canadian Ministry, and finally Sir Charles Tupper and the 7th Canadian Ministry. The Official Opposition was the Liberal Party, led by Wilfrid Laurier.

The Speaker was Peter White. See also List of Canadian electoral districts 1887-1892 for a list of the ridings in this parliament.

It was the second longest parliament in Canadian history.

Having five different people serve as prime minister during one parliament is easily a record for Canada; no other parliament has had more than two.

There were six sessions of the 7th Parliament:

| Session | Start | End |
|---|---|---|
| 1st | April 29, 1891 | September 30, 1891 |
| 2nd | February 25, 1892 | July 9, 1892 |
| 3rd | January 26, 1893 | April 1, 1893 |
| 4th | March 15, 1894 | July 23, 1894 |
| 5th | April 18, 1895 | July 22, 1895 |
| 6th | January 2, 1896 | April 23, 1896 |

== List of members ==
Following is a full list of members of the seventh Parliament listed first by province, then by electoral district.

Key:

- Party leaders are italicized.
- Cabinet ministers are in **boldface**.
- The Prime Minister is **both**.
- The Speaker is indicated by "(†)".

Electoral districts denoted by an asterisk (*) indicates that district was represented by two members.

=== British Columbia ===
| Electoral district | Name | Party | First elected/previously elected | No. of terms |
|---|---|---|---|---|
| Cariboo | Frank Stillman Barnard | Conservative | 1881 | 4th term |
| New Westminster | Gordon Edward Corbould | Conservative | 1888 | 2nd term |
| Vancouver | David William Gordon | Liberal-Conservative | 1882 | 3rd term |
| Vancouver | Andrew Haslam (by-election of 1893-05-02) | Conservative | 1893 | 1st term |
| Victoria* | Thomas Earle | Conservative | 1889 | 2nd term |
| Victoria* | **Edward Gawler Prior** (until 17 December 1895 appointment as Controller of Inland Revenue) | Conservative | 1888 | 2nd term |
| Victoria* | Edward Gawler Prior (by-election of 1896-01-06) | Conservative | 1888 | 2nd term |
| Yale | John Andrew Mara | Conservative | 1887 | 2nd term |

=== Manitoba ===
| Electoral district | Name | Party | First elected/previously elected | No. of terms |
|---|---|---|---|---|
| Lisgar | Arthur Wellington Ross | Liberal-Conservative | 1882 | 3rd term |
| Marquette | Robert Watson (until resignation) | Liberal | 1882 | 3rd term |
| Marquette | Nathaniel Boyd (by-election of 1892-07-15) | Conservative | 1892 | 1st term |
| Provencher | Alphonse Alfred Clément Larivière | Conservative | 1889 | 2nd term |
| Selkirk | **Thomas Mayne Daly** (until ministerial appointment) | Liberal-Conservative | 1887 | 2nd term |
| Selkirk | **Thomas Mayne Daly** (by-election of 1892-11-02) | Liberal-Conservative | 1887 | 2nd term |
| Winnipeg | **Hugh John Macdonald** (until resignation) | Liberal-Conservative | 1891 | 1st term |
| Winnipeg | Joseph Martin (by-election of 1893-11-22) | Liberal | 1893 | 1st term |

=== New Brunswick ===
| Electoral district | Name | Party | First elected/previously elected | No. of terms |
|---|---|---|---|---|
| Albert | Richard Chapman Weldon | Conservative | 1887 | 2nd term |
| Carleton | Newton Ramsay Colter (until election voided) | Liberal | 1891 | 1st term |
| Carleton | Newton Ramsay Colter (by-election of 1892-04-06) | Liberal | 1891 | 1st term |
| Charlotte | Arthur Hill Gillmor | Liberal | 1874 | 5th term |
| City and County of St. John* | John Douglas Hazen | Conservative | 1891 | 1st term |
| City and County of St. John* | Charles Nelson Skinner (until resignation) | Liberal | 1887 | 2nd term |
| City and County of St. John* | John A. Chesley (by-election of 1892-11-22, replacing Charles Skinner) | Conservative | 1892 | 1st term |
| City of St. John | Ezekiel McLeod | Conservative | 1891 | 1st term |
| Gloucester | Kennedy Francis Burns (until 21 March 1893 appointment to Senate) | Conservative | 1882 | 3rd term |
| Gloucester | Théotime Blanchard (by-election of 1894-05-05) | Conservative | 1894 | 1st term |
| Kent | Édouard H. Léger | Conservative | 1890 | 2nd term |
| Kent | George Valentine McInerney (by-election of 1892-12-06) | Liberal-Conservative | 1892 | 1st term |
| King's | **George Eulas Foster** | Conservative | 1882 | 3rd term |
| Northumberland | Michael Adams | Conservative | 1891 | 1st term |
| Northumberland | James Robinson (by-election of 1896-02-06) | Conservative | 1896 | 1st term |
| Queen's | George Gerald King (until election declared invalid) | Liberal | 1878, 1891 | 4th term* |
| Queen's | George Frederick Baird (declared elected 1892-02-25 by court decision) | Conservative | 1878, 1891 | 4th term* |
| Restigouche | John McAlister | Liberal-Conservative | 1891 | 1st term |
| Sunbury | Robert Duncan Wilmot | Conservative | 1867 | 7th term |
| Victoria | **John Costigan** | Liberal-Conservative | 1867 | 7th term |
| Westmorland | Josiah Wood (until Senate appointment) | Conservative | 1882 | 3rd term |
| Westmorland | Henry Absalom Powell (by-election of 1895-08-24) | Liberal-Conservative | 1895 | 1st term |
| York | Thomas Temple | Conservative | 1884 | 3rd term |

=== Northwest Territories ===
| Electoral district | Name | Party | First elected/previously elected | No. of terms |
|---|---|---|---|---|
| Alberta (Provisional District) | Donald Watson Davis | Conservative | 1887 | 2nd term |
| Assiniboia East | **Edgar Dewdney** (until 26 October 1892 resignation) | Conservative | 1872, (Note: Yale (BC)) 1888 | 5th term* |
| Assiniboia East | William Walter McDonald (by-election of 1892-11-21) | Conservative | 1892 | 1st term |
| Assiniboia West | Nicholas Flood Davin | Conservative | 1887 | 2nd term |
| Saskatchewan (Provisional District) | Day Hort MacDowall | Conservative | 1887 | 2nd term |

=== Nova Scotia ===
| Electoral district | Name | Party | First elected/previously elected | No. of terms |
|---|---|---|---|---|
| Annapolis | John Burpee Mills | Conservative | 1887 | 2nd term |
| Antigonish | **John Thompson** (died 12 December 1894) | Liberal-Conservative | 1885 | 3rd term |
| Antigonish | Colin Francis McIsaac (by-election of 1895-04-17) | Liberal | 1895 | 1st term |
| Cape Breton* | David MacKeen (resigned to allow seat for Charles Tupper) | Conservative | 1887 | 2nd term |
| Cape Breton* | Hector Francis McDougall | Liberal-Conservative | 1884 | 3rd term |
| Cape Breton* | **Charles Tupper** (by-election of 1896-02-04) | Conservative | 1867, 1887, 1896 | 7th term* |
| Colchester | William Albert Patterson | Conservative | 1891 | 1st term |
| Cumberland | **Arthur Rupert Dickey** (until unseated 22 December 1891) | Conservative | 1888 | 2nd term |
| Cumberland | **Arthur Rupert Dickey** (by-election of 1892-01-30, until Secretary of State appointment 21 December 1894) | Conservative | 1888 | 2nd term |
| Cumberland | **Arthur Rupert Dickey** (by-election of 1895-01-15) | Conservative | 1888 | 2nd term |
| Digby | Edward Charles Bowers | Liberal | 1891 | 1st term |
| Digby | Edward Charles Bowers (by-election of 1892-02-13) | Liberal | 1891 | 1st term |
| Guysborough | Duncan Cameron Fraser | Liberal | 1891 | 1st term |
| Halifax | Thomas Edward Kenny (until election voided) | Conservative | 1887 | 2nd term |
| Halifax | John Fitz William Stairs (until election voided) | Conservative | 1883, 1891 | 2nd term |
| Halifax | Thomas Edward Kenny (by-election of 1892-02-11) | Conservative | 1887, 1892 | 3rd term* |
| Halifax | John Fitz William Stairs (by-election of 1892-02-11) | Conservative | 1883, 1891, 1892 | 2nd term* |
| Hants | Alfred Putnam | Conservative | 1887 | 2nd term |
| Inverness | Hugh Cameron | Conservative | 1867, 1882 | 4th term* |
| Kings | Frederick William Borden (until unseated by petition 28 November 1891) | Liberal | 1874, 1887 | 4th term* |
| Kings | Frederick William Borden (by-election of 1892-02-13) | Liberal | 1874, 1887 | 4th term* |
| Lunenburg | Charles Edwin Kaulbach | Conservative | 1882, 1883, 1891 | 3rd term* |
| Pictou* | John McDougald | Liberal-Conservative | 1881 | 4th term |
| Pictou* | **Charles Hibbert Tupper** | Conservative | 1882 | 3rd term |
| Queens | Francis Gordon Forbes | Liberal | 1891 | 1st term |
| Queens | Francis Gordon Forbes (by-election of 1892-02-09) | Liberal | 1891 | 1st term |
| Richmond | Joseph Alexander Gillies (until unseated) | Conservative | 1891 | 1st term |
| Richmond | Joseph Alexander Gillies (by-election of 1892-01-21) | Conservative | 1891 | 1st term |
| Shelburne | Nathaniel Whitworth White | Liberal-Conservative | 1891 | 1st term |
| Victoria | John Archibald McDonald (until election voided) | Conservative | 1887 | 2nd term |
| Victoria | John Archibald McDonald (by-election of 1892-01-26) | Conservative | 1887 | 2nd term |
| Yarmouth | Thomas Barnard Flint | Liberal | 1891 | 1st term |

=== Ontario ===
| Electoral district | Name | Party | First elected/previously elected | No. of terms |
|---|---|---|---|---|
| Addington | George Walker Wesley Dawson | Liberal | 1891 | 1st term |
| Algoma | George Hugh Macdonell | Conservative | 1891 | 1st term |
| Bothwell | David Mills | Liberal | 1884 | 3rd term |
| Brant North | James Somerville | Liberal | 1882 | 3rd term |
| Brant South | William Paterson | Liberal | 1872 | 6th term |
| Brockville | **John Fisher Wood** (until controller nomination) | Liberal-Conservative | 1882 | 3rd term |
| Brockville | **John Fisher Wood** (by-election of 1892-12-21) | Liberal-Conservative | 1882 | 3rd term |
| Bruce East | Reuben Eldridge Truax (until unseated) | Liberal | 1891 | 1st term |
| Bruce East | Henry Cargill (by-election of 1892-02-11) | Conservative | 1892 | 1st term |
| Bruce North | Alexander McNeill | Liberal-Conservative | 1882 | 3rd term |
| Bruce West | James Rowand | Liberal | 1887 | 2nd term |
| Cardwell | Robert Smeaton White (until resignation) | Conservative | 1888 | 2nd term |
| Cardwell | William Stubbs (by-election of 1895-12-24) | Independent Conservative | 1895 | 1st term |
| Carleton | William Thomas Hodgins | Conservative | 1891 | 1st term |
| Cornwall and Stormont | Darby Bergin | Liberal-Conservative | 1872, 1878 | 5th term* |
| Dundas | Hugo Homer Ross | Conservative | 1891 | 1st term |
| Durham East | Thomas Dixon Craig | Independent Conservative | 1891 | 1st term |
| Durham West | Robert Beith | Liberal | 1891 | 1st term |
| Elgin East | Andrew B. Ingram (until election voided) | Liberal-Conservative | 1891 | 1st term |
| Elgin East | Andrew B. Ingram (by-election of 1892-02-12) | Liberal-Conservative | 1891 | 1st term |
| Elgin West | George Elliott Casey | Liberal | 1878 | 4th term |
| Essex North | William McGregor | Liberal | 1891 | 1st term |
| Essex South | Henry William Allan | Liberal | 1891 | 1st term |
| Frontenac | George Airey Kirkpatrick (until 1 June 1892 appointment as Ontario Lieutenant-Governor) | Conservative | 1870 | 7th term |
| Frontenac | Hiram Augustus Calvin (by-election of 1892-06-10) | Independent Conservative | 1892 | 1st term |
| Glengarry | Roderick R. McLennan (until unseated) | Conservative | 1891 | 1st term |
| Glengarry | Roderick R. McLennan (by-election of 1892-01-14) | Conservative | 1891 | 1st term |
| Grenville South | John Dowsley Reid | Conservative | 1891 | 1st term |
| Grey East | Thomas Simpson Sproule | Conservative | 1878 | 4th term |
| Grey North | James Masson | Conservative | 1887 | 2nd term |
| Grey South | George Landerkin | Liberal | 1872, 1882 | 5th term* |
| Haldimand | **Walter Humphries Montague** (until 26 March 1895 appointment as Secretary of State) | Conservative | 1887, 1890 | 3rd term* |
| Haldimand | **Walter Humphries Montague** (by-election of 1895-04-17) | Conservative | 1887, 1890 | 3rd term* |
| Halton | David Henderson | Conservative | 1887, 1888 | 3rd term* |
| Halton | David Henderson (by-election of 1892-01-28) | Conservative | 1887, 1888 | 3rd term* |
| Hamilton* | Alexander McKay | Conservative | 1887 | 2nd term |
| Hamilton* | Samuel Shobal Ryckman | Conservative | 1891 | 1st term |
| Hastings East | Samuel Barton Burdett (died 20 January 1892) | Liberal | 1887 | 2nd term |
| Hastings East | William Barton Northrup (by-election of 1892-02-20) | Conservative | 1892 | 1st term |
| Hastings North | **Mackenzie Bowell** (until 5 December 1892 appointment to Senate) | Conservative | 1867 | 7th term |
| Hastings North | Alexander Augustus Williamson Carscallen (by-election of 1892-12-20) | Conservative | 1892 | 1st term |
| Hastings West | Henry Corby Jr. (resigned 22 June 1894) | Conservative | 1888 | 2nd term |
| Hastings West | Henry Corby Jr. (by-election of 1894-07-04) | Conservative | 1888 | 2nd term |
| Huron East | Peter Macdonald | Liberal | 1887 | 2nd term |
| Huron South | John McMillan | Liberal | 1882, 1887 | 3rd term* |
| Huron West | Malcolm Colin Cameron (until unseated 26 December 1891) | Liberal | 1867, 1891 | 6th term* |
| Huron West | **James Colebrooke Patterson** (by-election of 1892-02-22, until appointed Manitoba Lieutenant-Governor 2 September 1895) | Conservative | 1878, (Note: Essex/Huron West) 1892 | 4th term* |
| Huron West | Malcolm Colin Cameron (by-election of 1896-01-14) | Liberal | 1867, 1891, 1896 | 7th term* |
| Kent | Archibald Campbell | Liberal | 1887 | 2nd term |
| Kingston | **John A. Macdonald** (died 6 June 1891) | Liberal-Conservative | 1867 | 7th term |
| Kingston | James Henry Metcalfe (by-election of 1892-01-28) | Conservative | 1892 | 1st term |
| Lambton East | George Moncrieff | Conservative | 1887 | 2nd term |
| Lambton West | James Frederick Lister | Liberal | 1882 | 3rd term |
| Lanark North | Joseph Jamieson (until 8 December 1891 judicial appointment) | Conservative | 1882 | 3rd term |
| Lanark North | Bennett Rosamond (by-election of 1891-12-31) | Conservative | 1891 | 1st term |
| Lanark South | **John Graham Haggart** | Conservative | 1872 | 6th term |
| Leeds North and Grenville North | Charles Frederick Ferguson | Liberal-Conservative | 1874 | 5th term |
| Leeds South | George Taylor | Conservative | 1882 | 3rd term |
| Lennox | David Wright Allison (until election voided) | Liberal | 1883, 1891 | 2nd term* |
| Lennox | Uriah Wilson (by-election of 1892-02-04) | Conservative | 1892 | 1st term |
| Lincoln and Niagara | William Gibson (until election voided 16 November 1891) | Liberal | 1891 | 1st term |
| Lincoln and Niagara | William Gibson (by-election of 1892-01-28) | Liberal | 1891 | 1st term |
| London | Charles Smith Hyman (until election voided) | Liberal | 1891 | 1st term |
| London | **John Carling** (by-election of 1892-02-26) | Liberal-Conservative | 1867, 1878, 1892 | 6th term* |
| Middlesex East | Joseph Henry Marshall (until election voided 21 January 1892) | Conservative | 1887 | 2nd term |
| Middlesex East | Joseph Henry Marshall (by-election of 1892-02-11) | Conservative | 1887 | 2nd term |
| Middlesex North | William Henry Hutchins | Conservative | 1891 | 1st term |
| Middlesex South | James Armstrong (died 26 January 1893) | Liberal | 1882 | 3rd term |
| Middlesex South | Robert Boston (by-election of 1893-03-22) | Liberal | 1893 | 1st term |
| Middlesex West | William Frederick Roome | Conservative | 1887 | 2nd term |
| Monck | John Brown (until unseated) | Liberal | 1891 | 1st term |
| Monck | Arthur Boyle (by-election of 1892-03-12) | Conservative | 1892 | 1st term |
| Muskoka and Parry Sound | William Edward O'Brien | Conservative | 1882 | 3rd term |
| Norfolk North | John Charlton | Liberal | 1872 | 6th term |
| Norfolk South | **David Tisdale** | Conservative | 1887 | 2nd term |
| Northumberland East | Edward Cochrane | Conservative | 1887 | 2nd term |
| Northumberland West | John Hargraft (until election voided) | Liberal | 1891 | 1st term |
| Northumberland West | George Guillet (by-election of 1892-03-15) | Conservative | 1892 | 1st term |
| Ontario North | Frank Madill (died in office) | Conservative | 1887 | 2nd term |
| Ontario North | John Alexander McGillivray (by-election of 1895-12-12) | Liberal-Conservative | 1895 | 1st term |
| Ontario South | James Ironside Davidson (until election voided) | Liberal | 1891 | 1st term |
| Ontario South | William Smith (by-election of 1892-02-20) | Conservative | 1892 | 1st term |
| Ontario West | James David Edgar | Liberal | 1884 | 3rd term |
| Ottawa (City of)* | Charles Herbert Mackintosh (until resignation) | Conservative | 1882, 1890 | 3rd term* |
| Ottawa (City of)* | Honoré Robillard | Liberal-Conservative | 1887 | 2nd term |
| Ottawa (City of)* | James Alexander Grant (by-election of 1893-12-07, replaces Mackintosh) | Conservative | 1893 | 1st term |
| Oxford North | James Sutherland | Liberal | 1880 | 4th term |
| Oxford South | Richard John Cartwright | Liberal | 1867 | 7th term |
| Peel | Joseph Featherston (until election voided) | Liberal | 1891 | 1st term |
| Peel | Joseph Featherston (by-election of 1892-02-11) | Liberal | 1891 | 1st term |
| Perth North | James Nicol Grieve (until election voided) | Liberal | 1891 | 1st term |
| Perth North | James Nicol Grieve (by-election of 1892-05-19) | Liberal | 1891 | 1st term |
| Perth South | James Trow (until election voided) | Liberal | 1872 | 6th term |
| Perth South | William Pridham (by-election of 1892-03-10) | Conservative | 1892 | 1st term |
| Peterborough East | John Burnham | Conservative | 1878, 1891 | 3rd term* |
| Peterborough West | James Stevenson | Conservative | 1887 | 2nd term |
| Prescott | Isidore Proulx (until unseated) | Liberal | 1891 | 1st term |
| Prescott | Isidore Proulx (by-election of 1892-03-30) | Liberal | 1891 | 1st term |
| Prince Edward | Archibald Campbell Miller (until election voided) | Conservative | 1891 | 1st term |
| Prince Edward | Archibald Campbell Miller (by-election of 1892-02-04) | Conservative | 1891 | 1st term |
| Renfrew North | Peter White (†) | Conservative | 1876 | 5th term |
| Renfrew South | John Ferguson | Independent Conservative | 1887 | 2nd term |
| Russell | William Cameron Edwards | Liberal | 1887 | 2nd term |
| Simcoe East | Philip Howard Spohn (until election voided) | Liberal | 1891 | 1st term |
| Simcoe East | William Humphrey Bennett (by-election of 1892-02-25) | Conservative | 1892 | 1st term |
| Simcoe North | Dalton McCarthy | Independent | 1887 | 2nd term |
| Simcoe South | Richard Tyrwhitt | Conservative | 1882 | 3rd term |
| Toronto Centre | George Ralph Richardson Cockburn | Conservative | 1887 | 2nd term |
| Toronto East | Emerson Coatsworth | Conservative | 1891 | 1st term |
| Victoria North | John Augustus Barron (until unseated) | Liberal | 1887 | 2nd term |
| Victoria North | Sam Hughes (by-election of 1892-02-11) | Liberal-Conservative | 1892 | 1st term |
| Victoria South | Charles Fairbairn (until election voided) | Liberal-Conservative | 1890 | 2nd term |
| Victoria South | Charles Fairbairn (by-election of 1892-02-11) | Liberal-Conservative | 1890 | 2nd term |
| Waterloo North | Isaac Erb Bowman | Liberal | 1867, 1887 | 5th term* |
| Waterloo South | James Livingston | Liberal | 1882 | 3rd term |
| Welland | William Manley German (until unseated) | Liberal | 1891 | 1st term |
| Welland | James A. Lowell (by-election of 1892-04-29) | Liberal | 1892 | 1st term |
| Wellington Centre | Andrew Semple | Liberal | 1887 | 2nd term |
| Wellington North | James McMullen | Liberal | 1882 | 3rd term |
| Wellington South | James Innes | Liberal | 1882 | 3rd term |
| Wentworth North | Thomas Bain | Liberal | 1872 | 6th term |
| Wentworth South | Franklin Metcalfe Carpenter | Conservative | 1887 | 2nd term |
| West Toronto | Frederick Charles Denison | Conservative | 1887 | 2nd term |
| York East | Alexander Mackenzie (died 17 April 1892) | Liberal | 1867 | 7th term |
| York East | William Findlay Maclean (by-election of 1892-05-11) | Conservative | 1892 | 1st term |
| York North | William Mulock | Liberal | 1882 | 3rd term |
| York West | **Nathaniel Clarke Wallace** | Conservative | 1878 | 4th term |
| York West | **Nathaniel Clarke Wallace** (by-election of 1892-12-21) | Conservative | 1878 | 4th term |

=== Prince Edward Island ===
| Electoral district | Name | Party | First elected/previously elected | No. of terms |
|---|---|---|---|---|
| King's County* | Augustine Colin Macdonald | Conservative | 1873, 1878, 1883, 1891 | 4th term* |
| King's County* | John McLean | Conservative | 1891 | 1st term |
| Prince County* | Stanislaus Francis Perry | Liberal | 1874, 1887 | 3rd term* |
| Prince County* | John Yeo | Liberal | 1891 | 1st term |
| Queen's County* | Louis Henry Davies | Liberal | 1882 | 3rd term |
| Queen's County* | William Welsh | Independent Liberal | 1887 | 2nd term |

=== Quebec ===
| Electoral district | Name | Party | First elected/previously elected | No. of terms |
|---|---|---|---|---|
| Argenteuil | Thomas Christie | Liberal | 1875, 1891 | 3rd term* |
| Bagot | Flavien Dupont | Conservative | 1882 | 3rd term |
| Beauce | Joseph Godbout | Liberal | 1887 | 2nd term |
| Beauharnois | Joseph Gédéon Horace Bergeron | Conservative | 1882 | 3rd term |
| Bellechasse | Guillaume Amyot | Nationalist Conservative | 1881 | 4th term |
| Berthier | Cléophas Beausoleil | Liberal | 1882 | 3rd term |
| Bonaventure | William LeBoutillier Fauvel | Liberal | 1891 | 1st term |
| Brome | Eugène Alphonse Dyer (until unseated) | Conservative | 1891 | 1st term |
| Brome | Eugène Alphonse Dyer (by-election of 1892-03-10) | Conservative | 1891 | 1st term |
| Chambly | Raymond Préfontaine | Liberal | 1886 | 3rd term |
| Champlain | Onésime Carignan | Conservative | 1891 | 1st term |
| Charlevoix | Henry Simard (died 6 November 1895) | Liberal | 1891 | 1st term |
| Charlevoix | Louis Charles Alphonse Angers (by-election of 1896-01-27) | Liberal | 1896 | 1st term |
| Chicoutimi—Saguenay | Paul Vilmond Savard (until unseated) | Liberal | 1891 | 1st term |
| Chicoutimi—Saguenay | Louis de Gonzague Belley (by-election of 1892-08-16) | Conservative | 1892 | 1st term |
| Châteauguay | James Pollock Brown | Liberal | 1891 | 1st term |
| Compton | Rufus Henry Pope | Conservative | 1889 | 2nd term |
| Dorchester | Cyrille Émile Vaillancourt | Nationalist | 1891 | 1st term |
| Drummond—Arthabaska | Joseph Lavergne | Liberal | 1882 | 3rd term |
| Gaspé | Louis Zéphirin Joncas | Conservative | 1882 | 3rd term |
| Hochelaga | Alphonse Desjardins (until 1 October 1892 Senate appointment) | Conservative | 1874 | 5th term |
| Hochelaga | Sévérin Lachapelle (by-election of 1892-10-21) | Conservative | 1892 | 1st term |
| Huntingdon | Julius Scriver | Liberal | 1869 | 7th term |
| Iberville | François Béchard | Liberal | 1867 | 7th term |
| Jacques Cartier | Désiré Girouard (until 28 September 1895 judicial appointment) | Conservative | 1878 | 4th term |
| Jacques Cartier | Napoléon Charbonneau (by-election of 1895-11-30) | Liberal | 1895 | 1st term |
| Joliette | Urbain Lippé | Conservative | 1891 | 1st term |
| Kamouraska | Henry George Carroll | Liberal | 1891 | 1st term |
| Laprairie | Louis Conrad Pelletier | Conservative | 1891 | 1st term |
| L'Assomption | Joseph Gauthier (until election voided 6 February 1892) | Liberal | 1887 | 2nd term |
| L'Assomption | Hormidas Jeannotte (by-election of 1892-05-31) | Conservative | 1892 | 1st term |
| Laval | **Joseph-Aldric Ouimet** (until 11 January 1892 ministerial appointment) (†) | Liberal-Conservative | 1873 | 6th term |
| Laval | **Joseph-Aldric Ouimet** (by-election of 1892-01-25) | Liberal-Conservative | 1873 | 6th term |
| Lévis | Pierre Malcom Guay | Liberal | 1885 | 3rd term |
| L'Islet | Louis-Georges Desjardins (resigned 30 September 1892) | Conservative | 1890 | 2nd term |
| L'Islet | Joseph Israël Tarte (by-election of 1893-01-05) | Independent | 1893 | 1st term |
| Lotbinière | Côme Isaïe Rinfret | Liberal | 1878 | 4th term |
| Maskinongé | Joseph Hormidas Legris | Liberal | 1891 | 1st term |
| Mégantic | Louis-Israël Côté alias Fréchette | Conservative | 1882, 1891 | 2nd term* |
| Missisquoi | George Barnard Baker | Liberal-Conservative | 1891 | 1st term |
| Montcalm | Joseph Louis Euclide Dugas (until election voided 28 January 1892) | Conservative | 1891 | 1st term |
| Montcalm | Joseph Louis Euclide Dugas (by-election of 1892-03-05) | Conservative | 1891 | 1st term |
| Montmagny | Philippe-Auguste Choquette | Liberal | 1887 | 2nd term |
| Montmorency | Joseph Israël Tarte (until election voided) | Conservative | 1891 | 1st term |
| Montmorency | Arthur Joseph Turcotte (by-election of 1892-03-10) | Conservative | 1892 | 1st term |
| Montreal Centre | **John Joseph Curran** (until 5 December 1892 Solicitor General appointment) | Conservative | 1882 | 3rd term |
| Montreal Centre | **John Joseph Curran** (by-election of 1892-12-18, until 18 October 1895 judicial appointment) | Conservative | 1882 | 3rd term |
| Montreal Centre | James McShane (by-election of 1895-12-27) | Liberal | 1895 | 1st term |
| Montreal East | Alphonse Télesphore Lépine | Independent Conservative | 1888 | 2nd term |
| Montreal West | Donald Alexander Smith | Independent Conservative | 1871, 1887 | 6th term* |
| Napierville | Dominique Monet | Liberal | 1891 | 1st term |
| Nicolet | Joseph Hector Leduc | Liberal | 1891 | 1st term |
| Ottawa (County of) | Charles Ramsay Devlin | Liberal | 1891 | 1st term |
| Pontiac | Thomas Murray (until election voided 9 May 1892) | Liberal | 1891 | 1st term |
| Pontiac | John Bryson (by-election of 1892-06-26) | Conservative | 1892 | 1st term |
| Portneuf | Arthur Delisle | Liberal | 1891 | 1st term |
| Quebec-Centre | François Charles Stanislas Langelier | Liberal | 1882 | 3rd term |
| Quebec County | Jules Joseph Taschereau Frémont | Liberal | 1891 | 1st term |
| Quebec East | Wilfrid Laurier | Liberal | 1874 | 5th term |
| Quebec West | Thomas McGreevy (expelled 29 September 1891) | Liberal-Conservative | 1867 | 7th term |
| Quebec West | John Hearn (by-election of 1892-02-26, died 17 May 1894) | Conservative | 1892 | 1st term |
| Quebec West | Thomas McGreevy (by-election of 1895-04-17) | Liberal-Conservative | 1867, 1895 | 8th term* |
| Richelieu | **Hector-Louis Langevin** (until resignation) | Conservative | 1867, (Note: Dorchester) 1876, (Note: Charlevoix) 1878 | 7th term* |
| Richelieu | Arthur Aimé Bruneau (by-election of 1892-01-11) | Liberal | 1892 | 1st term |
| Richmond—Wolfe | Clarence Chester Cleveland | Conservative | 1891 | 1st term |
| Rimouski | **Joseph Philippe René Adolphe Caron** | Conservative | 1887 | 2nd term |
| Rouville | Louis Philippe Brodeur | Liberal | 1878 | 4th term |
| St. Hyacinthe | Michel Esdras Bernier | Liberal | 1882 | 3rd term |
| St. John's | François Bourassa | Liberal | 1867 | 7th term |
| Saint Maurice | François Sévère Lesieur Desaulniers | Conservative | 1887 | 2nd term |
| Shefford | John Robbins Sanborn | Liberal | 1891 | 1st term |
| Town of Sherbrooke | **William Bullock Ives** (until 5 December 1892 appointment as Privy Council President) | Conservative | 1882 | 3rd term |
| Town of Sherbrooke | **William Bullock Ives** (by-election of 1892-12-21) | Conservative | 1882 | 3rd term |
| Soulanges | Joseph Octave Mousseau (until election voided) | Independent | 1891 | 1st term |
| Soulanges | James William Bain (by-election of 1892-02-03, until election voided) | Conservative | 1892 | 1st term |
| Soulanges | James William Bain (by-election of 1892-12-13) | Conservative | 1892 | 1st term |
| Stanstead | Timothy Byron Rider | Liberal | 1891 | 1st term |
| Témiscouata | Paul Étienne Grandbois | Conservative | 1878 | 4th term |
| Terrebonne | **Joseph-Adolphe Chapleau** (until 7 December 1892 appointment as Quebec Lieutenant-Governor) | Conservative | 1882 | 3rd term |
| Terrebonne | Pierre-Julien Leclair (by-election of 1893-01-10) | Conservative | 1893 | 1st term |
| Three Rivers | **Hector-Louis Langevin** | Conservative | 1867, 1876, 1878 | 7th term* |
| Two Mountains | Jean-Baptiste Daoust (died 28 December 1891) | Conservative | 1876 | 5th term |
| Two Mountains | Joseph Girouard (by-election of 1892-02-27) | Conservative | 1892 | 1st term |
| Vaudreuil | Henry Stanislas Harwood (unseated 8 January 1892) | Liberal | 1891 | 1st term |
| Vaudreuil | Henry Stanislas Harwood (by-election of 1893-04-12, until election voided) | Liberal | 1891 | 1st term |
| Vaudreuil | Hugh McMillan (by-election of 1892-02-29) | Conservative | 1892 | 1st term |
| Verchères | Félix Geoffrion (died 7 August 1894) | Liberal | 1867 | 7th term |
| Verchères | Christophe Alphonse Geoffrion (by-election of 1895-04-17) | Liberal | 1895 | 1st term |
| Yamaska | Roch Moïse Samuel Mignault | Liberal | 1891 | 1st term |

== By-elections ==
| By-election | Date | Incumbent | Party | Winner | Party | Cause | Retained |
|---|---|---|---|---|---|---|---|
| Northumberland | February 6, 1896 | Michael Adams | Conservative | James Robinson | Conservative | Called to the Senate. | Yes |
| Cape Breton | February 4, 1896 | David MacKeen | Conservative | Charles Tupper | Conservative | Resignation to provide a seat for Tupper. | Yes |
| Charlevoix | January 27, 1896 | Henry Simard | Liberal | Louis Charles Alphonse Angers | Liberal | Death | Yes |
| Huron West | January 14, 1896 | James Colebrooke Patterson | Conservative | Malcolm Colin Cameron | Liberal | Appointed Lieutenant-Governor of Manitoba. | No |
| Victoria | January 6, 1896 | Edward Gawler Prior | Conservative | Edward Gawler Prior | Conservative | Recontested upon appointment as Minister of Inland Revenue. | Yes |
| Montreal Centre | December 27, 1895 | John Joseph Curran | Conservative | James McShane | Liberal | Appointed a judge of the Superior Court of Quebec. | No |
| Cardwell | December 24, 1895 | Robert Smeaton White | Conservative | William Stubbs | McCarthyite | Resignation. | No |
| Ontario North | December 12, 1895 | Frank Madill | Conservative | John Alexander McGillivray | Conservative | Death. | Yes |
| Jacques Cartier | November 30, 1895 | Désiré Girouard | Conservative | Napoléon Charbonneau | Liberal | Appointed a judge of the Supreme Court of Canada. | No |
| Westmorland | August 24, 1895 | Josiah Wood | Conservative | Henry A. Powell | Liberal-Conservative | Called to the Senate. | Yes |
| Verchères | April 17, 1895 | Félix Geoffrion | Liberal | Christophe-Alphonse Geoffrion | Liberal | Death. | Yes |
| Quebec West | April 17, 1895 | John Hearn | Conservative | Thomas McGreevy | Liberal-Conservative | Death. | Yes |
| Antigonish | April 17, 1895 | John Sparrow David Thompson | Liberal-Conservative | Colin Francis McIsaac | Liberal | Death | No |
| Haldimand | April 17, 1895 | Walter Humphries Montague | Conservative | Walter Humphries Montague | Conservative | Recontested upon appointment as Secretary of State for Canada. | Yes |
| Cumberland | January 15, 1895 | Arthur Rupert Dickey | Conservative | Arthur Rupert Dickey | Conservative | Recontested upon appointment as Secretary of State for Canada. | Yes |
| Hastings West | July 4, 1894 | Henry Corby, Jr. | Conservative | Henry Corby, Jr. | Conservative | resignation to recontest due to selling methylated spirits to the government. | Yes |
| Gloucester | May 5, 1894 | Kennedy Francis Burns | Conservative | Théotime Blanchard | Conservative | Called to the Senate. | Yes |
| Ottawa (City of) | December 7, 1893 | Charles H. Mackintosh | Conservative | Honoré Robillard | Liberal-Conservative | Appointed Lieutenant Governor of the North-West Territories. | Yes |
| Winnipeg | November 22, 1893 | Hugh John Macdonald | Liberal-Conservative | Joseph Martin | Liberal | Resignation | No |
| Vancouver | May 2, 1893 | David William Gordon | Liberal-Conservative | Andrew Haslam | Liberal-Conservative | Death | Yes |
| Vaudreuil | April 12, 1893 | Hugh McMillan | Conservative | Henry Stanislas Harwood | Liberal | Election declared void. | No |
| Middlesex South | March 22, 1893 | James Armstrong | Liberal | Robert Boston | Liberal | Death | Yes |
| Terrebonne | January 10, 1893 | Joseph-Adolphe Chapleau | Conservative | Pierre-Julien Leclair | Conservative | Appointed Lieutenant-Governor of Quebec. | Yes |
| L'Islet | January 5, 1893 | Louis-Georges Desjardins | Conservative | Joseph-Israël Tarte | Independent | Appointed Clerk of the Legislative Assembly of Quebec. | No |
| Town of Sherbrooke | December 21, 1892 | William Bullock Ives | Conservative | William Bullock Ives | Conservative | Recontested upon appointment as President of the Privy Council. | Yes |
| York West | December 21, 1892 | Nathaniel Clarke Wallace | Conservative | Nathaniel Clarke Wallace | Conservative | Recontested upon appointment as Controller of Customs. | Yes |
| Brockville | December 21, 1892 | John Fisher Wood | Liberal-Conservative | John Fisher Wood | Liberal-Conservative | Recontested upon appointment as Controller of Inland Revenue. | Yes |
| Hastings North | December 20, 1892 | Mackenzie Bowell | Conservative | Alexander Augustus Williamson Carscallen | Conservative | Called to the Senate. | Yes |
| Montreal Centre | December 18, 1892 | John Joseph Curran | Conservative | John Joseph Curran | Conservative | Recontested upon appointment as Solicitor General. | Yes |
| Soulanges | December 13, 1892 | James William Bain | Conservative | James William Bain | Conservative | Election declared void. | Yes |
| Kent | December 6, 1892 | Édouard H. Léger | Conservative | George McInerney | Conservative | Death | Yes |
| City and County of St. John | November 22, 1892 | Charles Nelson Skinner | Liberal | John Alexander Chesley | Conservative | Appointed a judge. | No |
| Assiniboia East | November 21, 1892 | Edgar Dewdney | Conservative | William Walter McDonald | Conservative | Appointed Lieutenant-Governor of British Columbia. | Yes |
| Selkirk | November 2, 1892 | Thomas Mayne Daly | Liberal-Conservative | Thomas Mayne Daly | Liberal-Conservative | Recontested upon appointment as Minister of the Interior and Superintendent General of Indian Affairs. | Yes |
| Hochelaga | October 21, 1892 | Alphonse Desjardins | Conservative | Séverin Lachapelle | Conservative | Called to the Senate. | Yes |
| Chicoutimi—Saguenay | August 16, 1892 | Paul Vilmond Savard | Liberal | Louis-de-Gonzague Belley | Conservative | Election declared void. | No |
| Marquette | July 15, 1892 | Robert Watson | Liberal | Nathaniel Boyd | Conservative | Resignation to enter provincial politics in Manitoba. | No |
| Pontiac | June 26, 1892 | Thomas Murray | Liberal | John Bryson | Conservative | Election declared void. | No |
| Frontenac | June 10, 1892 | George Airey Kirkpatrick | Conservative | Hiram Augustus Calvin | Independent Conservative | Appointed Lieutenant Governor of Ontario. | No |
| L'Assomption | May 31, 1892 | Joseph Gauthier | Liberal | Hormidas Jeannotte | Conservative | Election declared void. | No |
| Perth North | May 19, 1892 | James Nicol Grieve | Liberal | James Nicol Grieve | Liberal | Election declared void. | Yes |
| York East | May 11, 1892 | Alexander Mackenzie | Liberal | William Findlay Maclean | Independent Conservative | Death | No |
| Welland | April 29, 1892 | William Manley German | Liberal | James A. Lowell | Liberal | Election declared void. | Yes |
| Carleton | April 6, 1892 | Newton Ramsay Colter | Liberal | Newton Ramsay Colter | Liberal | Election declared void. | Yes |
| Prescott | March 30, 1892 | Isidore Proulx | Liberal | Isidore Proulx | Liberal | Election declared void. | Yes |
| Northumberland West | March 15, 1892 | John Hargraft | Liberal | George Guillet | Conservative | Election declared void. | No |
| Monck | March 12, 1892 | John Brown | Liberal | Arthur Boyle | Conservative | Election declared void. | No |
| Brome | March 10, 1892 | Eugène Alphonse Dyer | Conservative | Eugène Alphonse Dyer | Conservative | Election declared void. | Yes |
| Perth South | March 10, 1892 | James Trow | Liberal | William Pridham | Conservative | Election declared void. | No |
| Montmorency | March 10, 1892 | Joseph Israël Tarte | Conservative | Arthur-Joseph Turcotte | Conservative | Election declared void. | Yes |
| Montcalm | March 5, 1892 | Joseph Louis Euclide Dugas | Conservative | Joseph Louis Euclide Dugas | Conservative | Election declared void. | Yes |
| Vaudreuil | February 29, 1892 | Henry Stanislas Harwood | Liberal | Hugh McMillan | Conservative | Election declared void. | No |
| Two Mountains | February 27, 1892 | Jean-Baptiste Daoust | Conservative | Joseph Girouard | Conservative | Death | Yes |
| Quebec West | February 26, 1892 | Thomas McGreevy | Liberal-Conservative | John Hearn | Conservative | Expelled from the House of Commons for corruption. | Yes |
| London | February 26, 1892 | C.S. Hyman | Liberal | John Carling | Liberal-Conservative | Election declared void. | No |
| Queen's | February 25, 1892 | George Gerald King | Liberal | George Frederick Baird | Conservative | King being declared not duly elected, 25 February 1892, George Frederick Baird was declared elected by a court decision. | No |
| Simcoe East | February 25, 1892 | Philip Howard Spohn | Liberal | William Humphrey Bennett | Conservative | Election declared void. | No |
| Huron West | February 22, 1892 | Malcolm Colin Cameron | Liberal | James Colebrooke Patterson | Conservative | Election declared void. | No |
| Ontario South | February 20, 1892 | James Ironside Davidson | Liberal | William Smith | Conservative | Election declared void. | No |
| Hastings East | February 20, 1892 | Samuel Barton Burdett | Liberal | William Barton Northrup | Conservative | Death | No |
| King's | February 13, 1892 | Frederick William Borden | Liberal | Frederick William Borden | Liberal | Election declared void. | Yes |
| Digby | February 13, 1892 | Edward Charles Bowers | Liberal | Edward Charles Bowers | Liberal | Election declared void. | Yes |
| Elgin East | February 12, 1892 | Andrew B. Ingram | Liberal-Conservative | Andrew B. Ingram | Liberal-Conservative | Election declared void. | Yes |
| Bruce East | February 11, 1892 | Reuben Eldridge Truax | Liberal | Henry Cargill | Conservative | Election declared void. | No |
| Victoria South | February 11, 1892 | Charles Fairbairn | Liberal-Conservative | Charles Fairbairn | Liberal-Conservative | Election declared void. | Yes |
| Peel | February 11, 1892 | Joseph Featherston | Liberal | Joseph Featherston | Liberal | Election declared void. | Yes |
| Victoria North | February 11, 1892 | John Augustus Barron | Liberal | Sam Hughes | Liberal-Conservative | Election declared void. | No |
| Halifax | February 11, 1892 | Thomas Edward Kenny and John Fitzwilliam Stairs | Conservative | Thomas Edward Kenny and John Fitzwilliam Stairs | Conservative | Election declared void. (Double member constituency) | Yes |
| Middlesex East | February 11, 1892 | Joseph Henry Marshall | Conservative | Joseph Henry Marshall | Conservative | Election declared void. | Yes |
| Queens | February 9, 1892 | Francis Gordon Forbes | Liberal | Francis Gordon Forbes | Liberal | Election declared void. | Yes |
| Prince Edward | February 4, 1892 | Archibald Campbell Miller | Conservative | Archibald Campbell Miller | Conservative | Election declared void. | Yes |
| Lennox | February 4, 1892 | David Wright Allison | Liberal | Uriah Wilson | Conservative | Election declared void. | No |
| Soulanges | February 3, 1892 | Joseph Octave Mousseau | Independent | James William Bain | Conservative | Election declared void. | No |
| Cumberland | January 30, 1892 | Arthur Rupert Dickey | Conservative | Arthur Rupert Dickey | Conservative | Election declared void. | Yes |
| Lincoln and Niagara | January 28, 1892 | William Gibson | Liberal | William Gibson | Liberal | Election declared void. | Yes |
| Halton | January 28, 1892 | David Henderson | Conservative | David Henderson | Conservative | Election declared void. | Yes |
| Kingston | January 28, 1892 | John A. Macdonald | Conservative | James Henry Metcalfe | Conservative | Death | Yes |
| Victoria | January 26, 1892 | John Archibald McDonald | Conservative | John Archibald McDonald | Conservative | Election declared void. | Yes |
| Laval | January 25, 1892 | Joseph-Aldric Ouimet | Liberal-Conservative | Joseph-Aldric Ouimet | Liberal-Conservative | Recontested upon appointment as Minister of Public Works. | Yes |
| Richmond | January 21, 1892 | Joseph Alexander Gillies | Conservative | Joseph Alexander Gillies | Conservative | Election declared void. | Yes |
| Glengarry | January 14, 1892 | Roderick R. McLennan | Conservative | Roderick R. McLennan | Conservative | Election declared void. | Yes |
| Richelieu | January 11, 1892 | Hector-Louis Langevin | Conservative | Arthur-Aimé Bruneau | Liberal | Chose to sit for Trois-Rivières. | No |
| Lanark North | December 31, 1891 | Joseph Jamieson | Conservative | Bennett Rosamond | Conservative | Appointed a county court judge. | Yes |
