= Monck, Ontario =

Monck, Ontario may refer to:

- Monck (electoral district), a former federal riding near Welland, Ontario
- Monck (provincial electoral district), a former provincial riding near Welland, Ontario
- Village of Monck, within the township of Wellington North, Ontario
