= William Stubbs (Canadian politician) =

Canadian politician

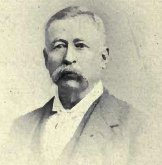

Member of the Canadian Parliament for Cardwell
- In office 1895–1900
- Preceded by: Robert Smeaton White
- Succeeded by: Robert Johnston

Personal details
- Born: July 11, 1847 Caledon Township, Canada West
- Died: December 28, 1926 (aged 79) Port Elgin, Ontario, Canada
- Party: Independent Conservative

William Stubbs (July 11, 1847 – November 28, 1926) was a Canadian veterinarian, farmer, and politician.

Born in Caledon Township, Canada West, the son of John Stubbs and Susannah Lauden, who were from County Fermanagh, Ireland and came to Canada in 1824. Stubbs was educated in public school and at the Veterinary College of Medicine in Toronto, where he graduated in March 1868. He was the Ontario Government Veterinary Surgeon for the District of Peel and Cardwell. Stubbs was Deputy Reeve and Reeve of the Township of Caledon for several years. He was first elected to the House of Commons of Canada in an 1895 by-election for the electoral district of Cardwell as a McCarthyite. An Independent Conservative, he was re-elected in the 1896 election. He was defeated in the 1900 election.

In 1888, he married Annie Gillespie.
