= George Gerald King =

Canadian politician (1836–1928)

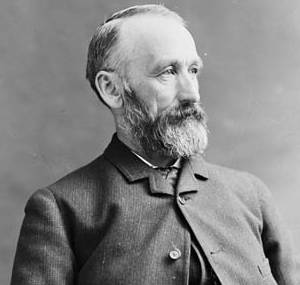
- King in 1884

Member of the Canadian Parliament for Queen's
- In office 1878–1887
- Preceded by: John Ferris
- Succeeded by: George Frederick Baird
- In office 1891–1892
- Preceded by: George Frederick Baird
- Succeeded by: George Frederick Baird

Member of the Senate of Canada for New Brunswick
- In office 1896 – 28 April 1928

Personal details
- Born: 11 December 1836 Springfield, New Brunswick
- Died: 28 April 1928 (aged 91) Edmonton, Alberta, Canada
- Party: Liberal
- Profession: Businessman

George Gerald King (11 December 1836 – 28 April 1928) was a Canadian politician.

Born in Springfield, New Brunswick, the son of Malcolm King and Elizabeth Hickson, he was a businessman before being elected to the House of Commons of Canada in the New Brunswick riding of Queen's in the 1878 federal election. A Liberal, he was re-elected in the 1882 election. He was defeated in the 1887 election and an 1888 by-election, and was re-elected in the 1891 and 1896 elections.

In 1860, King married Esther Briggs. Their son George Herbert King served in the New Brunswick assembly and their son James Horace King served in the House of Commons.

He was appointed to the Senate of Canada in 1896, representing the senatorial division of Queen's, New Brunswick. He died in office in 1928.

== Electoral record ==
1878 Canadian federal election: Queen's
Party	Candidate	Votes
Liberal	George Gerald King	1,143
Liberal–Conservative	Ezekiel Stone Wiggins	630

1882 Canadian federal election: Queen's
Party	Candidate	Votes
Liberal	George Gerald King	1,084
Liberal–Conservative	S.L. Peters	886

1887 Canadian federal election: Queen's
Party	Candidate	Votes
Liberal	George Gerald King	1,191
Conservative	George Frederick Baird	1,130

By-election: On Mr. Baird's resignation because his election was contested, 24 November 1887

By-election on 18 January 1888
Party	Candidate	Votes
Conservative	George Frederick Baird	1,175
Liberal	George Gerald King	1,064

N.B. The Canadian Directory of Parliament states that George Frederick Baird was declared duly elected by a court decision.

1891 Canadian federal election: Queen's
Party	Candidate	Votes
Liberal	George Gerald King	1,233
Conservative	George Frederick Baird	1,204
