= Cardwell (federal electoral district) =

Former federal electoral district in Ontario, Canada

Ontario electoral district

Defunct federal electoral district
- Legislature: House of Commons
- District created: 1867
- District abolished: 1903
- First contested: 1867
- Last contested: 1900

Cardwell, a federal electoral district in the Canadian province of Ontario, was represented in the House of Commons of Canada from 1867 to 1904. Cardwell is sometimes also considered one of Ontario's historic counties, as Cardwell was listed in some post-Confederation census records as a county of residence.

Cardwell consisted of the Simcoe County townships of Adjala and Mono, and the Peel County townships of Albion (including the town of Bolton) and Caledon.

The Cardwell electoral district was abolished in 1903 when it was redistributed between Dufferin, Peel and Simcoe South ridings.

== Members of Parliament ==
This riding elected the following members of the House of Commons of Canada:

Parliament	Years	Member	Party
1st	1867–1872	Thomas Roberts Ferguson	Conservative
2nd	1872–1874	John Hillyard Cameron	Conservative
3rd	1874–1876	John Hillyard Cameron	Conservative
3rd	1876–1878	Dalton McCarthy	Conservative
4th	1878–1882	Thomas White	Conservative
5th	1882–1885	Thomas White	Conservative
5th	1885–1887	Thomas White	Conservative
6th	1887–1888	Thomas White	Conservative
6th	1888–1892	Robert Smeaton White	Conservative
7th	1891–1895	Robert Smeaton White	Conservative
7th	1895–1896	William Stubbs	McCarthyite
8th	1896–1900	William Stubbs	Independent Conservative
9th	1900–1904	Robert Johnston	Conservative
Electoral district dissolved into Dufferin, Peel and Simcoe South

== Election results ==
1867 Canadian federal election
Party	Candidate	Votes
Conservative	Thomas Roberts Ferguson	1,155
Unknown	Dr. Philips	1,078
Eligible voters		2,612
Source: Canadian Parliamentary Guide, 1871

1872 Canadian federal election
Party	Candidate	Votes
Conservative	Hon. John Hillyard Cameron	1,232
Unknown	? Boulton	1,016

1874 Canadian federal election
Party	Candidate	Votes
Conservative	Hon. John Hillyard Cameron	1,204
Unknown	Thomas Bowles	1,140

On Mr. Cameron's death, 14 November 1876:

By-election on 14 December 1876
Party	Candidate	Votes
Conservative	D'Alton McCarthy	acclaimed

1878 Canadian federal election
Party	Candidate	Votes
Conservative	Thomas White	1,218
Unknown	Jos. Pattulo	961

1882 Canadian federal election
Party	Candidate	Votes
Conservative	Thomas White	1,407
Liberal	James F. McLaughlin	1,066

On Mr. White's nomination as member of the Privy Council and as Minister of the Interior, 5 August 1885:

By-election on 27 August 1885
Party	Candidate	Votes
Conservative	Thomas White	acclaimed

1887 Canadian federal election
Party	Candidate	Votes
Conservative	Hon. Thomas White	1,531
Liberal	James H. Newlove	1,128

On Mr. White's death, 21 April 1888:

By-election on 3 October 1888
Party	Candidate	Votes
Conservative	Robert Smeaton White	1,088
Independent Conservative	William Stubbs	949

1891 Canadian federal election
Party	Candidate	Votes
Conservative	Robert S. White	1,628
Liberal	Elgin Myers	1,380

On Mr. White's resignation, October 1895:

While the Library of Parliament reports that Stubbs won by acclamation, newspaper reports indicate there was an election between three candidates, William Stubbs (running as a McCarthyite, rather than an Independent Conservative, R. B. Willoughby for the Conservatives and R. B. Henry for the Liberals.

By-election on 24 December 1895
Party	Candidate	Votes
McCarthyite	William Stubbs	1,503
Conservative	W. B. Willoughby	1,296
Liberal	R. B. Henry	544

1896 Canadian federal election
Party	Candidate	Votes
Independent Conservative	William Stubbs	1,825
Conservative	William Legh Walsh	1,441

1900 Canadian federal election
Party	Candidate	Votes
Conservative	Robert Johnston	1,484
Independent Conservative	William Stubbs	1,293

== See also ==
- List of Canadian electoral districts
- Historical federal electoral districts of Canada
