= Richard Harcourt =

Canadian politician

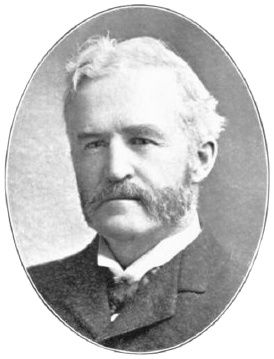

Ontario MPP
- In office 1878–1908
- Preceded by: Henry Ryan Haney
- Succeeded by: James Alway Ross
- Constituency: Monck

Personal details
- Born: March 17, 1849 Seneca Township, Haldimand County, Canada West
- Died: November 29, 1932 (aged 83) Welland, Ontario
- Party: Liberal
- Spouse: Augusta H. Young (m. 1876)
- Occupation: Lawyer

Richard Harcourt (March 17, 1849 – November 29, 1932) was a Canadian lawyer, judge, and politician. He served as a member of the Legislative Assembly of Ontario for the riding of Monck from 1879 to 1908. He was Ontario's treasurer from 1890 to 1899.

He was born in Seneca Township, Haldimand County, Canada West in 1849, the son of Michael Harcourt who was a member of the parliament for the Province of Canada and studied at the University of Toronto. He was principal of Cayuga High School and served as inspector of schools in Haldimand County from 1871 to 1876, also studying law during that period. In 1876, he married Augusta H. Young, was called to the bar in the same year and set up practice in Welland. Harcourt served as deputy judge in Welland County in 1886. In 1890, he was named Queen's Counsel. He also served as inspector of schools for Welland and the town of Niagara Falls. He died in Welland in 1932.

== Electoral history ==
Ontario provincial by-election, January 9, 1879: Monck Death of Henry Ryan Haney
Party	Candidate	Votes	%	±%
Liberal	Richard Harcourt	469	57.06	+1.76
Independent	Mr. Heaslip	353	42.94	
Total valid votes		822		
Liberal hold		Swing		+1.76
Source: History of the Electoral Districts, Legislatures and Ministries of the Province of Ontario

1879 Ontario general election: Monck
Party	Candidate	Votes	%	±%
Liberal	Richard Harcourt	1,486	52.64	−4.42
Conservative	E.K. Dodds	1,337	47.36	
Total valid votes		2,823	81.42	
Eligible voters		3,467		
Liberal hold		Swing		−4.42
Source: Elections Ontario

== Offices held ==
Legislative Assembly of Ontario
Preceded by Henry Ryan Haney	Member for Monck; 1878–1908	Succeeded by James Alway Ross
Ross ministry, Province of Ontario (1899–1905)
Cabinet post (1)
Predecessor	Office	Successor
George William Ross	Minister of Education; 1899-1905	Robert Pyne
Hardy ministry, Province of Ontario (1896–1899)
Mowat ministry, Province of Ontario (1872–1896)
Cabinet post (1)
Predecessor	Office	Successor
Alexander Ross	Treasurer; 1890-1899	George William Ross
