= Ontario and Pacific Junction Railway =

Canadian railway company

The Ontario and Pacific Junction Railway (O&PJ) is a historic Canadian railway company that was chartered in Ontario. It was a "paper" railway that received a charter for construction but was never built.

The company was incorporated in 1874 to connect the railways of Southern Ontario to the proposed transcontinental line of the Canadian Pacific Railway that had been chartered by the Government of Canada in 1872.

The O&PJ failed to obtain the funding necessary to commence construction and a similar line was completed by a rival company, the Northern and Pacific Junction Railway.

The directors of the O&PJ included: James David Edgar, president, along with William Thomson, John Turner, D. Galbraith, John Moat, Henry S Howland, Hermon Henry Cook and Alexander Peter Cockburn.
