= Monck (provincial electoral district) =

Ontario electoral district

Defunct provincial electoral district
- Legislature: Legislative Assembly of Ontario
- District created: 1867
- District abolished: 1914
- First contested: 1867
- Last contested: 1911

Monck was an electoral riding in Ontario, Canada. It was created in 1867 at the time of confederation and was abolished in 1914. It was merged into the riding of Lincoln.

== Members of Provincial Parliament ==
Monck
Assembly	Years	Member	Party
1st	1867–1871	George Secord	Conservative
2nd	1871–1872	Lachlin McCallum	Conservative
2nd	1872–1874	Henry Ryan Haney	Liberal
3rd	1875–1878	Henry Ryan Haney	Liberal
3rd	1878–1879	Richard Harcourt	Liberal
4th	1879–1883	Richard Harcourt	Liberal
5th	1883–1886	Richard Harcourt	Liberal
6th	1886–1890	Richard Harcourt	Liberal
7th	1890–1894	Richard Harcourt	Liberal
8th	1894–1898	Richard Harcourt	Liberal
9th	1898–1902	Richard Harcourt	Liberal
10th	1902–1904	Richard Harcourt	Liberal
11th	1905–1908	Richard Harcourt	Liberal
12th	1908–1911	James Alway Ross	Conservative
13th	1911–1914	Thomas Marshall	Liberal
Sourced from the Ontario Legislative Assembly
Merged into Lincoln before the 1914 election

== Election results ==
1911 Ontario general election
Party	Candidate	Votes	%	±%
Liberal	Thomas Marshall	1,875	52.14	+2.63
Conservative	James Alway Ross	1,721	47.86	–2.63
Total valid votes		3,596	98.85	
Total rejected ballots		42	1.15	+0.55
Turnout		3,638	75.87	–14.36
Eligible voters		4,795		
Liberal gain from Conservative		Swing		+2.63
Source: Elections Ontario

1908 Ontario general election
Party	Candidate	Votes	%	±%
Conservative	James Alway Ross	1,816	50.49	+1.60
Liberal	Thomas Marshall	1,781	49.51	–1.60
Total valid votes		3,597	99.39	
Total rejected ballots		22	0.61	–1.54
Turnout		3,619	90.23	+7.46
Eligible voters		4,011		
Conservative gain from Liberal		Swing		+1.60
Source: Elections Ontario

1905 Ontario general election
Party	Candidate	Votes	%	±%
Liberal	Richard Harcourt	1,766	51.11	–4.03
Conservative	James Alway Ross	1,689	48.89	+4.03
Total valid votes		3,455	97.85	
Total rejected ballots		76	2.15	+1.71
Turnout		3,531	82.77	+4.52
Eligible voters		4,266		
Liberal hold		Swing		–4.03
Source: Elections Ontario

1902 Ontario general election
Party	Candidate	Votes	%	±%
Liberal	Richard Harcourt	1,876	55.14	+0.64
Conservative	James Alway Ross	1,526	44.86	–0.64
Total valid votes		3,402	99.56	
Total rejected ballots		15	0.44	–0.70
Turnout		3,417	78.25	–6.21
Eligible voters		4,367		
Liberal hold		Swing		+0.64
Source: Elections Ontario

1898 Ontario general election
Party	Candidate	Votes	%	±%
Liberal	Richard Harcourt	1,985	54.50	+3.38
Conservative	T. Galbraith	1,657	45.50	–
Total valid votes		3,642	98.86	
Total rejected ballots		42	1.14	–1.51
Turnout		3,684	84.46	+11.84
Eligible voters		4,362		
Liberal hold		Swing		+1.69
Source: Elections Ontario

1894 Ontario general election
Party	Candidate	Votes	%	±%
Liberal	Richard Harcourt	1,519	51.13	–5.70
Protestant Protective	Hugh Crawford	1,452	48.87	–
Total valid votes		2,971	97.35	
Total rejected ballots		81	2.65	–
Turnout		3,052	72.61	–
Eligible voters		4,203		
Liberal hold		Swing		–
Source: Elections Ontario

Ontario provincial by-election, September 30, 1890 Ministerial by-election, appointment as Provincial Treasurer
Party	Candidate	Votes
Liberal	Richard Harcourt	acclaimed
Source: Elections Ontario

1890 Ontario general election
Party	Candidate	Votes	%	±%
Liberal	Richard Harcourt	1,765	56.83	+5.04
Liberal	T.A. Snider	1,341	43.17	–8.61
Total valid votes		3,106	99.52	
Total rejected ballots		15	0.48	+0.17
Turnout		3,121	71.30	–0.76
Eligible voters		4,377		
Liberal hold		Swing		+6.83
Source: Elections Ontario

1886 Ontario general election
Party	Candidate	Votes	%	±%
Liberal	Richard Harcourt	1,643	51.78	–0.39
Conservative	Arthur Boyle	1,530	48.22	+0.39
Total valid votes		3,173	99.69	
Total rejected ballots		10	0.31	+0.02
Turnout		3,183	72.06	–5.87
Eligible voters		4,417		
Liberal hold		Swing		–0.39
Source: Elections Ontario

1883 Ontario general election
Party	Candidate	Votes	%	±%
Liberal	Richard Harcourt	1,574	52.17	–0.47
Conservative	Walter Humphries Montague	1,443	47.83	+0.47
Total valid votes		3,017	99.70	
Total rejected ballots		9	0.30	+0.30
Turnout		3,026	77.93	–3.50
Eligible voters		3,883		
Liberal hold		Swing		–0.47
Source: Elections Ontario

1879 Ontario general election
Party	Candidate	Votes	%	±%
Liberal	Richard Harcourt	1,486	52.64	−4.42
Conservative	E.K. Dodds	1,337	47.36	
Total valid votes		2,823	81.42	
Eligible voters		3,467		
Liberal hold		Swing		−4.42
Source: Elections Ontario

Ontario provincial by-election, January 9, 1879 Death of Henry Ryan Haney
Party	Candidate	Votes	%	±%
Liberal	Richard Harcourt	469	57.06	+1.76
Independent	Mr. Heaslip	353	42.94	
Total valid votes		822		
Liberal hold		Swing		+1.76
Source: History of the Electoral Districts, Legislatures and Ministries of the Province of Ontario

Ontario provincial by-election, November 1875 Previous election voided
Party	Candidate	Votes	%	±%
Liberal	Henry Ryan Haney	1,362	55.30	+3.63
Conservative	George Secord	1,101	44.70	
Total valid votes		2,463		
Liberal hold		Swing		+3.63
Source: History of the Electoral Districts, Legislatures and Ministries of the Province of Ontario

1875 Ontario general election
Party	Candidate	Votes	%	±%
Liberal	Henry Ryan Haney	1,412	56.21	+4.54
Conservative	S.W. Hill	1,100	43.79	
Total valid votes		2,512	74.47	
Eligible voters		3,373		
Election voided
Source: Elections Ontario

Ontario provincial by-election, September 1872 Resignation of Lachlin McCallum
Party	Candidate	Votes	%	±%
Liberal	Henry Ryan Haney	1,283	51.67	+1.81
Independent	E. Lee	1,200	48.33	
Total valid votes		2,483	100.0	+33.71
Liberal gain from Conservative		Swing		+1.81
Source: History of the Electoral Districts, Legislatures and Ministries of the Province of Ontario

1871 Ontario general election
Party	Candidate	Votes	%	±%
Conservative	Lachlin McCallum	931	50.13	−5.96
Liberal	James David Edgar	926	49.87	+5.96
Turnout		1,857	66.35	−12.24
Eligible voters		2,799		
Conservative hold		Swing		−5.96
Source: Elections Ontario

1867 Ontario general election
Party	Candidate	Votes	%
Conservative	George Secord	1,118	56.10
Liberal	A. Morse	875	43.90
Total valid votes		1,993	78.59
Eligible voters		2,536	
Conservative pickup new district.			
Source: Elections Ontario
