= Lachlin McCallum =

Canadian politician (1823–1903)

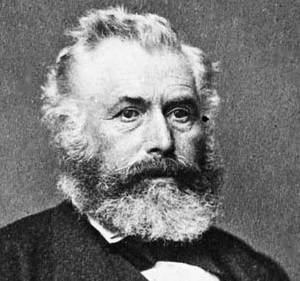

Member of Parliament for Monck
- In office 1874–1887
- Preceded by: James David Edgar
- Succeeded by: Arthur Boyle
- In office 1867–1872
- Preceded by: Riding established
- Succeeded by: James David Edgar

Ontario MPP
- In office 1871–1872
- Preceded by: George Secord
- Succeeded by: Henry Ryan Haney
- Constituency: Monck

Personal details
- Born: March 15, 1823 Tiree, Argyllshire, Scotland
- Died: January 13, 1903 (aged 79) Stromness, Ontario, Canada
- Party: Conservative
- Spouse: Priscilla Dawson Thewliss (m. 1854)
- Occupation: Contractor; politician

Lachlin (Lachlan) McCallum (March 15, 1823 – January 13, 1903) was a Canadian politician.

== Background ==
McCallum, born in Tiree, Argyllshire, Scotland, was a contractor and shipowner before entering politics as a Liberal-Conservative. He represented the riding of Monck in the House of Commons of Canada from 1867 to 1872, when he was defeated by James David Edgar. However, in 1874, McCallum defeated Edgar by a margin of just 34 votes, and was returned to Parliament.

Due to the closeness of the result, McCallum was unseated on May 12, 1875. In the subsequent byelection, McCallum again defeated Edgar, this time by a mere 4 votes.

McCallum was an unsuccessful candidate for a seat in assembly for the Province of Canada in 1863. He was also a member of the Legislative Assembly of Ontario having been elected in the 1871 election in the riding of Monck. He was a member of the Ontario Conservative Party.

He served as reeve for the United Townships of Sherbrooke and Moulton in Ontario.

McCallum remained in the House until 1887, when he was appointed to the Senate; he served in the Senate until his death at the age of 79.

McCallum was the founder and Naval Captain (Colonel) of the Dunnville Naval Brigade 1861–1866. During the Fenian Raid he commanded the 'war tug' W.T. Robb and fought with his men against the Fenians in Fort Erie on the afternoon of June 2. Outnumbered 10 to 1, McCallum and sixteen other men fought their way out of Fort Erie before being rescued by the Robb.

McCallum lived in Stromness, Ontario. In 1854, he married Priscilla Dawson Thewliss. He died in office in Stromness in 1903.

== Electoral history ==
=== Federal ===
1867 Canadian federal election: Monck
Party	Candidate	Votes
Liberal–Conservative	Lachlin McCallum	1,126
Unknown	Dr. Frazer	871
Eligible voters		2,539
Source: Canadian Parliamentary Guide, 1871

1872 Canadian federal election: Monck
Party	Candidate	Votes
Liberal	James David Edgar	1,334
Liberal–Conservative	Lachlin McCallum	1,293
Source: Canadian Elections Database

1874 Canadian federal election: Monck
Party	Candidate	Votes
Liberal–Conservative	Lachlin McCallum	1,354
Liberal	James David Edgar	1,320
lop.parl.ca

By-election on 22 June 1875 Due to unseating of Lachlin McCallum, 12 May 1875
Party	Candidate	Votes
Liberal–Conservative	Lachlin McCallum	1,333
Liberal	James David Edgar	1,329

1878 Canadian federal election: Monck
Party	Candidate	Votes
Liberal–Conservative	Lachlin McCallum	1,459
Liberal	James David Edgar	1,431

1882 Canadian federal election: Monck
Party	Candidate	Votes
Liberal–Conservative	Lachlin McCallum	1,445
Unknown	George A. McCallum	1,420

=== Provincial ===
1871 Ontario general election: Monck
Party	Candidate	Votes	%	±%
Conservative	Lachlin McCallum	931	50.13	−5.96
Liberal	James David Edgar	926	49.87	+5.96
Turnout		1,857	66.35	−12.24
Eligible voters		2,799		
Conservative hold		Swing		−5.96
Source: Elections Ontario
