= George Secord =

Canadian politician

Ontario MPP
- In office 1867–1871
- Preceded by: Riding established
- Succeeded by: Lachlin McCallum
- Constituency: Monck

Personal details
- Born: June 18, 1802 St. Davids, Ontario
- Died: December 1, 1881 (aged 79) Lincoln, Ontario
- Party: Conservative
- Spouse: Anna Maria Snider (m. 1831)
- Children: 1

George Secord (June 18, 1802 – December 1, 1881) was an Ontario political figure. He represented Monck in the Legislative Assembly of Ontario from 1867 to 1871 as a Conservative member.

He was born in St. Davids, Ontario in 1805 and grew up there. In 1831, he married Anna Maria Snider. He served on the district and county council for 22 years and was for a short time warden of Welland County.

== Electoral history ==
1867 Ontario general election: Monck
Party	Candidate	Votes	%
Conservative	George Secord	1,118	56.10
Liberal	A. Morse	875	43.90
Total valid votes		1,993	78.59
Eligible voters		2,536	
Conservative pickup new district.			
Source: Elections Ontario

Ontario provincial by-election, November 1875: Monck Previous election voided
Party	Candidate	Votes	%	±%
Liberal	Henry Ryan Haney	1,362	55.30	+3.63
Conservative	George Secord	1,101	44.70	
Total valid votes		2,463		
Liberal hold		Swing		+3.63
Source: History of the Electoral Districts, Legislatures and Ministries of the Province of Ontario
