= James David Edgar =

Canadian politician

The Honourable Sir James David Edgar K.C.M.G, P.C.
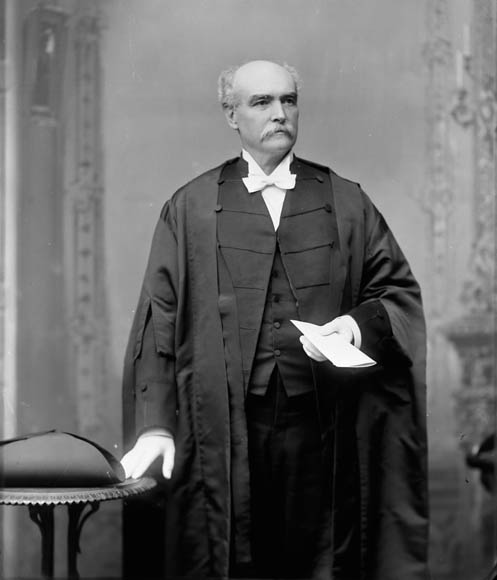

7th Speaker of the House of Commons of Canada
- In office August 19, 1896 – July 31, 1899
- Preceded by: Peter White
- Succeeded by: Thomas Bain

Member of the Canadian Parliament for Monck
- In office 1872–1874
- Preceded by: Lachlin McCallum
- Succeeded by: Lachlin McCallum

Member of the Canadian Parliament for Ontario West
- In office 1884–1899
- Preceded by: George Wheler
- Succeeded by: Isaac James Gould

Personal details
- Born: August 10, 1841 Hatley, Canada East
- Died: July 31, 1899 (aged 57) Toronto, Ontario, Canada
- Party: Liberal

Sir James David Edgar, KCMG PC QC (August 10, 1841 – July 31, 1899) was a Canadian politician.

== Biography ==
Born in Hatley, Canada East (later Quebec), Edgar was educated at the Lennoxville Classical School (now Bishop's College School), where his father James Edgar was appointed the Second Master by the Rev. Lucius Doolittle, Rector of Sherbrooke. It was reported that despite the younger age than his classmates, he is a hard-working student in his class. After the death of his father in 1850, he continued his education in Quebec City.

In his twenties, Edgar was a law student, legal editor of the Toronto Globe, an alderman on Toronto's city council and an organizer for the Liberal Party in Ontario. He was also rare among English Canadians of the time for his sympathy for the rights of French-Canadians. Edgar was married to Matilda Ridout and together they had nine children.

He moved to Toronto as an adult and became a lawyer in 1864. He was elected an alderman in 1866, and was a supporter of George Brown and the Reform Party. He ran as a Liberal in the 1871 Ontario provincial election, but was defeated by a margin of four votes in his attempt to win a seat in the provincial legislature.

He was first elected to the House of Commons of Canada in the 1872 federal election, and became Whip in the caucus of Alexander Mackenzie. He helped bring down the Conservative government over the Pacific Scandal. However, despite the election of a Liberal government in the ensuing election, Edgar was defeated in his own riding.

In 1874, he started a railway company called the Ontario and Pacific Junction Railway. This was an attempt to build a line between Toronto and Lake Nipissing. In 1881, it was renamed the Ontario and Sault Ste. Marie Railway. Both ventures failed to win a contract. Fred Cumberland, a partner in the O&PJR venture, formed a rival company called the Northern and Pacific Junction Railway. In 1888, the N&PJR merged with the Grand Trunk Railway.

Edgar was undaunted by these setbacks and in 1889 started a new company called the Belt Line Railway in Toronto. The city's steep ravines made access to some areas very difficult. The land developers of these areas required either a commuter railway or a system of bridges to ease access to their properties for buyers. This new venture sought to build a commuter rail line in Toronto connecting downtown with undeveloped neighbourhoods as far north as Eglinton Avenue between the Don River and the Humber River. Eventually two rail loops were built with 44 stations in total. The passenger railway opened in 1892 but ran for only two years, four months before going bankrupt. (The city built bridges, eventually.)

He used his experience to become the Liberal's railway critic when he returned to Parliament (and the Opposition benches) through an 1884 by-election.

In the 1880s, Edgar became a vocal opponent of the Protestant Protective Association, an anti-Catholic political party associated with the Ontario Conservative Party. He argued in favour of tolerance and cooperation between English and French Canadians as well as between Protestants and Catholics. He also argued against the concept of Imperial Federation, for greater Canadian independence from Britain, and in favour of reciprocity with the United States.

When the Liberals formed a government under Wilfrid Laurier following the 1896 federal election, Edgar was nominated to become Speaker of the House of Commons of Canada, and was given a knighthood by Queen Victoria. Edgar was in poor health, however, and died in 1899 prior to the end of this term.

== Electoral record ==
1871 Ontario general election: Monck
Party	Candidate	Votes	%	±%
Conservative	Lachlin McCallum	931	50.13	−5.96
Liberal	James David Edgar	926	49.87	+5.96
Turnout		1,857	66.35	−12.24
Eligible voters		2,799		
Conservative hold		Swing		−5.96
Source: Elections Ontario

1872 Canadian federal election: Monck
Party	Candidate	Votes
Liberal	James David Edgar	1,334
Liberal–Conservative	Lachlin McCallum	1,293
Source: Canadian Elections Database

1874 Canadian federal election: Monck
Party	Candidate	Votes
Liberal–Conservative	Lachlin McCallum	1,354
Liberal	James David Edgar	1,320
lop.parl.ca

By-election on 22 June 1875 Due to unseating of Lachlin McCallum, 12 May 1875
Party	Candidate	Votes
Liberal–Conservative	Lachlin McCallum	1,333
Liberal	James David Edgar	1,329

1878 Canadian federal election: Monck
Party	Candidate	Votes
Liberal–Conservative	Lachlin McCallum	1,459
Liberal	James David Edgar	1,431

1882 Canadian federal election: Monck
Party	Candidate	Votes
Liberal–Conservative	Lachlin McCallum	1,445
Unknown	George A. McCallum	1,420
