= John Brown (Canadian politician) =

Canadian politician

- In office 1891–1892
- Preceded by: Arthur Boyle
- Succeeded by: Arthur Boyle

Personal details
- Born: 23 December 1841 Wentworth County, Canada West
- Died: 1 August 1905 (aged 63)
- Party: Liberal
- Profession: miller, mining consultant, prospector

John Brown (23 December 1841 – 1 August 1905) was a Liberal party member of the House of Commons of Canada. He was born in Wentworth County, Canada West and became a miller and mining consultant / prospector by career.

He became the Member of Parliament for Monck following his victory in the 1891 federal election. After several months service in the 7th Parliament, Brown was unseated the following year and replaced by Arthur Boyle in a 12 March 1892 by-election.

== Electoral record ==
1891 Canadian federal election: Monck
Party	Candidate	Votes
Liberal	John Brown	1,874
Conservative	Arthur Boyle	1,614
