= Henry Ryan Haney =

Canadian politician (1835–1878)

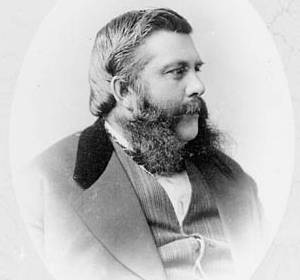

Ontario MPP
- In office 1872–1878
- Preceded by: Lachlin McCallum
- Succeeded by: Richard Harcourt
- Constituency: Monck

Personal details
- Born: 1835 Pelham, Upper Canada
- Died: November 17, 1878 (aged 42–43) Pelham, Ontario, Canada
- Party: Liberal
- Occupation: Physician

Henry Ryan Haney (1835 – November 17, 1878) was an Ontario medical doctors and political figure. He represented Monck in the Legislative Assembly of Ontario as a Liberal member from 1872 to 1878.

He served as coroner for Welland. He was first elected to the provincial legislature in an 1872 by-election after the sitting member, Lachlin McCallum, resigned when it became illegal for members to sit in both the House of Commons of Canada and the Ontario legislature. Haney was reelected in 1875 but unseated on appeal; he was elected in the by-election that followed and represented Monck until his death in 1878.

== Electoral history ==
Ontario provincial by-election, September 1872: Monck Resignation of Lachlin McCallum
| Party | Candidate | Votes | % | ±% |
|---|---|---|---|---|
| Liberal | Henry Ryan Haney | 1,283 | 51.67 | +1.81 |
| Independent | E. Lee | 1,200 | 48.33 | |
| Total valid votes | | 2,483 | 100.0 | +33.71 |
| Liberal gain from Conservative | | Swing | | +1.81 |
Source: History of the Electoral Districts, Legislatures and Ministries of the Province of Ontario

1875 Ontario general election: Monck
| Party | Candidate | Votes | % | ±% |
|---|---|---|---|---|
| Liberal | Henry Ryan Haney | 1,412 | 56.21 | +4.54 |
| Conservative | S.W. Hill | 1,100 | 43.79 | |
| Total valid votes | | 2,512 | 74.47 | |
| Eligible voters | | 3,373 | | |
Election voided
Source: Elections Ontario

Ontario provincial by-election, November 1875: Monck Previous election voided
| Party | Candidate | Votes | % | ±% |
|---|---|---|---|---|
| Liberal | Henry Ryan Haney | 1,362 | 55.30 | +3.63 |
| Conservative | George Secord | 1,101 | 44.70 | |
| Total valid votes | | 2,463 | | |
| Liberal hold | | Swing | | +3.63 |
Source: History of the Electoral Districts, Legislatures and Ministries of the Province of Ontario
