= Queen's (New Brunswick federal electoral district) =

Former federal electoral district in New Brunswick, Canada

New Brunswick electoral district

Defunct federal electoral district
- Legislature: House of Commons
- District created: 1867
- District abolished: 1892
- First contested: 1867
- Last contested: 1892 by-election

Demographics
- Census division(s): Queens

Queen's was a federal electoral district in New Brunswick, Canada, that was represented in the House of Commons of Canada from 1867 to 1896.

It was created by the British North America Act 1867. It consisted of the County of Queen's. It was abolished in 1892 when it was merged into Sunbury—Queen's riding.

== Members of Parliament ==
This riding elected the following members of Parliament:

Parliament	Years	Member	Party
Queen's
1st	1867–1872	John Ferris	Liberal
2nd	1872–1874	John Ferris	Liberal
3rd	1874–1878	John Ferris	Liberal
4th	1878–1882	George Gerald King	Liberal
5th	1882–1887	George Gerald King	Liberal
6th	1887–1887	George Gerald King	Liberal
6th	1888–1891	George Frederick Baird	Conservative
7th	1891–1892	George Gerald King	Liberal
7th	1892–1896	George Frederick Baird	Conservative
Riding dissolved into Sunbury—Queen's

== Election results ==
1867 Canadian federal election
Party	Candidate	Votes
Liberal	John Ferris	acclaimed
Source: Canadian Elections Database

1872 Canadian federal election
Party	Candidate	Votes
Liberal	John Ferris	621
Unknown	Amasa Coy	135
Unknown	V.W. Wiggins	30

1874 Canadian federal election
Party	Candidate	Votes
Liberal	John Ferris	621
Unknown	Amasa Coy	135
Unknown	V.W. Wiggins	30
Source: lop.parl.ca

1878 Canadian federal election
Party	Candidate	Votes
Liberal	George Gerald King	1,143
Liberal–Conservative	Ezekiel Stone Wiggins	630

1882 Canadian federal election
Party	Candidate	Votes
Liberal	George Gerald King	1,084
Liberal–Conservative	S.L. Peters	886

1887 Canadian federal election
Party	Candidate	Votes
Liberal	George Gerald King	1,191
Conservative	George Frederick Baird	1,130

By-election: On Mr. Baird's resignation because his election was contested, 24 November 1887

By-election on 18 January 1888
Party	Candidate	Votes
Conservative	George Frederick Baird	1,175
Liberal	George Gerald King	1,064

N.B. The Canadian Directory of Parliament states that George Frederick Baird was declared duly elected by a court decision.

1891 Canadian federal election
Party	Candidate	Votes
Liberal	George Gerald King	1,233
Conservative	George Frederick Baird	1,204

By-election: On Mr. King being declared not duly elected, 25 February 1892, George Frederick Baird was declared elected by a court decision.

By-election on 25 February 1892
Party	Candidate	Votes
Conservative	BAIRD, George Frederick

== See also ==
- List of Canadian electoral districts
- Historical federal electoral districts of Canada
