= Ezekiel Stone Wiggins =

Canadian scientist, teacher, author

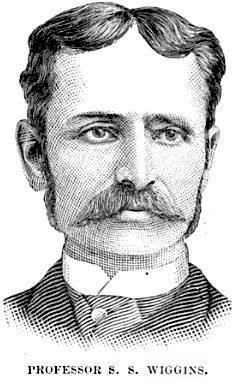
- Professor Ezekiel Stone Wiggins 1888
- Born: December 4, 1839; Grand Lake, Queen's County, New Brunswick, Canada
- Died: August 14, 1910 (aged 70); Arbour House, Britannia, Ottawa, Ontario Canada
- Other name: the "Ottawa Prophet"
- Occupations: civil servant, teacher, author
- Known for: scholar, amateur astronomer, historian, epidemiologist, meteorologist and cryptozoologist

Ezekiel Stone Wiggins (December 4, 1839 – August 14, 1910) was a Canadian weather and earthquake predictor known as the "Ottawa Prophet". He was the author of several scientific, educational and religious works.

== Early life and education ==
Ezekiel Wiggins was born in Grand Lake, Queens County, New Brunswick, in 1839 to Daniel Slocum Wiggins and Elizabeth Titus Stone, both of United Empire Loyalist descent. The Wiggins family claims descent from Capt Thomas Wiggins of Shrewsbury, England, who became the first Governor of New Hampshire in 1630.

Ezekiel was a pupil at the Oakwood Grammar School (1858). He attended secondary school in Ontario, and stayed to become a teacher in Mariposa Township, Ontario. On August 2, 1862, he married his sixteen-year-old cousin Susan Anna Wiggins, the daughter of Vincent White Wiggins and Charlotte E. Wiggins. The couple did not have any children. Their religion was Anglican. Susan became an author and poet. He was a student at the Philadelphia University of Medicine and Surgery, where he earned an MD in 1867-69. He earned a Bachelor of Arts from Albert University, in Belleville, Ontario, in 1870, while serving as the head master of a highschool in Ingersoll, Ontario.

== Career and theories ==
Wiggins wrote The Architecture of the Heavens, which was published in Montreal by John Lovell in 1864. He worked as a local superintendent of schools in 1866.

In 1867, Wiggins wrote a criticism about Universalism in Christianity titled Universalism unfounded: being a complete analysis and refutation of the system which was published in Napanee, Ontario, by Henry & Co. in 1867 According to the preface, "Here every Orthodox minister and private Christian is furnished with a text book on Universalism. Containing a complete refutation of every position, hithero assumed either in the affirmative of universal salvation or the negative of punishment"

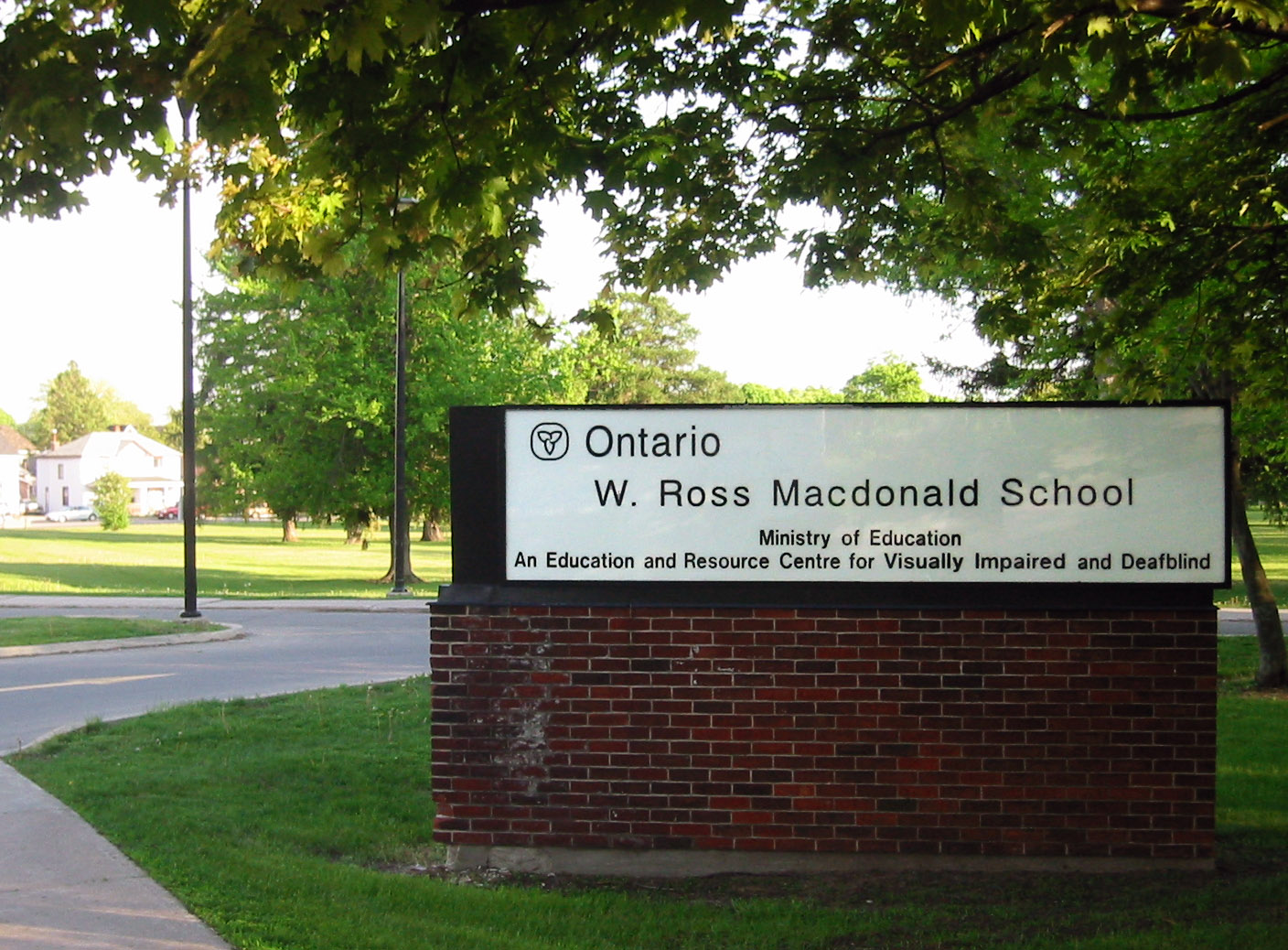
W Ross Macdonald School, Brantford

Wiggins served as the first principal (1872–1874) of W. Ross Macdonald School, whose motto is "the impossible is only the untried". The school, which opened its doors in Brantford, Ontario, in March 1872, provides instruction from kindergarten to secondary school graduation for blind and deafblind students. Wiggins wrote English Grammar, which was published by Copp, Clarks & Co, Toronto in 1874.

Wiggins founded Thompson's School in 1874, a boy's day school housed upstairs in Whelpley Hall near the Rothesay railway station, in Rothesay, an affluent suburb of the prosperous city of Saint John, New Brunswick.

Wiggins, who was an amateur Cryptozoologist, argued in "Days of the Creation" published in the St. John New Brunswick Globe in July 1876 that Plesiosaurus dilichodeirus, genus of large marine Sauropterygian reptile that lived in the Oolitic era was not extinct, based on reported sightings by passengers and crew of the Steamer New York, of a marine animal swimming with its head twelve feet above the water near Boston. He later theorized that "the Plesiosaurus exists in Rice Lake is certain and it is probably twenty feet in length,"

In 1876, the Wiggins advertised their summer home, consisting of Hunting Lodge dwelling, guests' house, wood, ice, and bath house on a wilderness property on the west shore of the Grand Lake, New Brunswick.

Wiggins was an amateur historian who wrote "The History of Queens County" New Brunswick in a series of articles in the Saint John newspaper, The Watchman, in the fall and winter of 1876 and 1877. The History of Queens County by E. Stone Wiggins was edited by Richard and Sandra Thorne and was published in 1993 by the Queens County Historical Society, Saint John, New Brunswick.

He ran unsuccessfully in 1878 to represent Queen's (New Brunswick federal electoral district), which was a federal electoral district in New Brunswick, Canada, that was represented in the House of Commons of Canada. The Wiggins collection of "Scraps concerning Queen's County election, Sept. 17th, 1878" is in Library and Archives Canada.

He was appointed federal civil servant in the finance department by Prime Minister John A. Macdonald in 1878. He continued to serve as a federal civil servant until 2 years before his death. From 1878-1892, the couple lived at 237 Daly Avenue, in Ottawa, Ontario. From 1892–93, the couple lived at Arbour House in Britannia, Ottawa.

Wiggins wrote the Architecture of the Heavens containing a new theory of the universe and the extent of the deluge, and testimony of the Bible and geology in opposition to the views of Dr. Colenso. Wiggins' theorized that storms, unusual tides, earthquakes and cyclones were all caused by planetary attraction, and that both visible and invisible planets could shift the Earth's centre of Gravity. He claimed to have predicted the 1869 Saxby Gale. He claimed that the Sun was merely an electric light, which did not generate any heat.

In 1901-02, Wiggins served as rector's warden at St. Stephen's Anglican Church (Ottawa).

Wiggins theorized that the unusual proximity of Jupiter to the Earth and the action of the Moon upon Jupiter were responsible for the cold weather Canada experienced in the winter of 1904.

Although Wiggins claimed to have discovered Earth's second moon in 1882, it was reported in The Comber Herald in 1907 that astronomers were unable to verify the discovery.

Wiggins' prophecies about storms and earthquakes, which were based on his astronomical calculations, appeared in Wiggins' storm herald, with almanac, 1883 and in his warning letters reprinted in various newspapers.

Wiggins predicted a number of storms in February 1883. The Auckland Star reported that Wiggins' prediction of a storm on the Atlantic March 7, 1883, came to pass "A severe gale, accompanied by a heavy fall of snow, has been experienced over the greater part of England. Much damage has been caused on land by the wind and snowdrifts, and many disasters at sea are reported owing to the severity of the gale which raged along the coast."

Wiggins predicted that a great storm would strike Earth between the March 9–11, 1883 with a theatre of its ravages India, the south of Europe, England and North America, and leading to the submerging of the lowlands of the Atlantic. He predicted that no vessel smaller than a Cunarder would be able to live in this tempest. Wiggins predicted that a great Hurricane and Tidal Wave would strike America on March 9, 1883. Wiggins advised the Canadian Minister of Marine and Lords of Admiralty that all vessels should be in safe harbours not later than March 5 since minor storms precede great ones. Some Canadians accorded the prophet credit for having made a fair prediction based on a severe storm on 7 March, a few days early of Wiggins' prediction of the 9th.

Wiggins explained that the severe snowstorm on March 7–8 was caused by one of planets moving into position to take part in great storm he predicted on 9th and 11 March. Wiggins predicted that the Northern Lights would precede his storm; The Aurora borealis was bright on March 8. On March 10 there was a light rain and hail followed by a gale in Halifax.

After the storm failed to appear at Montreal, Quebec; Ottawa, Ontario, Halifax, Nova Scotia, and Toronto, Ontario, on March 9 and 11, fishermen complained about the Fishing industry losses stemming from keeping the fishing fleet in port.

The Hull, England Fishing fleet was hard hit in a storm on March 9, 1883, losing 37 vessels and leaving 500 families destitute. Sydney Australia suffered a northerly buster, which fell short of the tidal wave and hurricane predicted by Wiggins. "If the storm does not come as predicted, Wiggins must go to the foot of the class. We shall have nothing to do with Canadian prophets. If we must have weather prophets we shall raise them ourselves and thus stimulate home industry"

Wiggins lost credibility and was termed a "false prophet" and "a fool and his folly" since the storms were not as terrible as Wiggins had predicted; Neither a great tidal wave nor a hurricane appeared. "This Wiggins, as a prophet, is a mushroom creation of American journalism and the ripe result of as shrewd a piece of inferential advertising as had lately been attempted. He achieved fame in the sailing of one balloon."

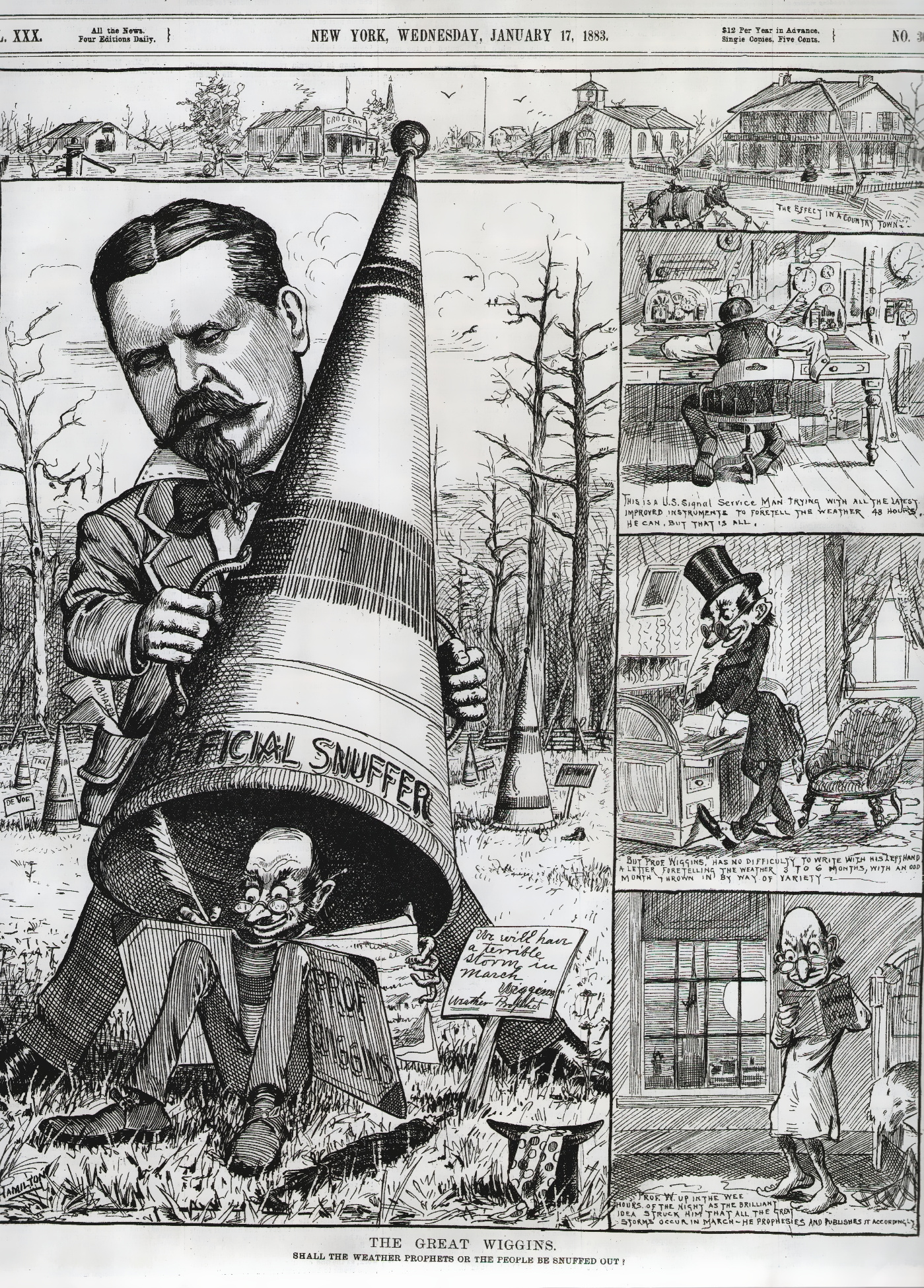
Wiggins prophesy - New York Daily Graphic Jan 17, 1883 by Grant Hamilton

A cartoon by Grant Hamilton from the front page of the New York Daily Graphic on Jan 17, 1883, explained Wiggins' prophesies concisely. "The Great Wiggins shall the weather prophets or the people be snuffed out? Wiggins, the weather prophet prophesied 'We will have a terrible storm in March.' The effect in a country town. This is a US signal service man trying with all the latest improved instruments to foretell the weather 48 hours he can but that is all. But Prof Wiggins has no difficulty to write with his left hand a letter foretelling the weather 3 to 6 months, with an extra month thrown in by way of variety. Prof W up in the wee ours of the night as the great storms occur in March - he prophesies and publishes it accordingly.'

Some of the Wiggin's predictions were fulfilled. He predicted, for example, the earthquake that appeared in England in 1884.

In 1885, Wiggins' retirement as a weather prophet was reported in Once a Month. "The days of weather prophets are not yet over, despite the immense scientific advancements of meteorology – for who did not hear a year or so ago of "Wiggins" Predictions, and how fleets of ships actually remained in port in the United States, deterred from putting to sea by the Wiggins prophecy of terrific storms on the east coast of America? These storms did not come off and Wiggins retired into the shade"

After the Charleston Earthquake of 1886, Wiggins announced that a more powerful disaster would occur at 2 p.m. on September 29; believers in North America panicked, quit work, and dressed in "ascension robes and waited for the end of the world. Wiggins theorized that "Earthquakes are caused by the shifting of the earth's centre of gravity. Suppose this centre of gravity to be moved, say one mile from her normal centre of gravity, or from her centre of volume; now, what must happen? Why, the parts of her surface at the end of the longer axis will be heavier and the parts at the end of the shorter axis will be lighter than normally. These disks, therefore, will grind upon each other, generating heat and lava. Hence earthquakes and volcanic eruptions. If our little visible satellite were brought down and slid around the earth from east to west, in 24 hours earthquakes would occur of such violence as to render our globe uninhabitable." Mark Twain wrote a humorous prophecy about Wiggins, which appeared in American and Canadian newspapers. "As meteor approaches Canada it will make a majestic downward swoop in the direction of Ottawa, affording a spectacle resembling a million inverted rainbows woven together, and will take the Prophet Wiggins right in the seat of his inspiration and lift him straight up into the back yard of the planet Mars, and leave him permanently there in an inconceivably mashed and unpleasant condition." Grip's cartoon about Wiggins' earthquake prophecy had an angry Charleston resident 'Stone Wiggins!' Grip also included the Modern Barney Buntline, a poem about Wiggins' predictions," ...When its only in an almanac it don't do so much harm, 'Cos they're limited to wind or rain or hail; But a special storm prediction causes seamen much alarm While Wiggins in a-wagging of his tail". Although the predicted earthquake and stormy weather did not take place in Charleston; there was an earthquake in Elizabethtown, Pennsylvania, and the Colima (volcano) erupted on September 29, 1886. He lost credibility since the earthquake and storms were not the 'greatest blow of the century' he had predicted.

Wiggins and gullible newspapers who carried his predictions were labelled cranks and fools in 1886. "A learned man may become a fool -by assuming the role of a "Weather Prophet" for instance. Wiggins and the crank who publishes and edits the Bradford Prophet are notable instances," advised the editor of the Flesherton Advance. Wiggins was advised to quit weather-propheting. "Give up weather-propheting, Mr. Wiggins, for you have proven on two occasions that you are not constituted for this line of business... Wiggins, you are about the most unmitigated and unabridged fizzle we ever heard of. In fact, you are no Weather-Prophet' American and Canadian newspapers published humorous poems 'The Modern Barney Buntline'; and humorous stories 'The weather prophet's lament' about Wiggins storm prophecy.

A. S. Hooker criticized Wiggins and other prophets in "Great earthquakes: their history, phenomena and causes", published by W.C. Regand, 1887 for their prediction methods, predictions which did not come to pass as well as predictions missed. Hooper though the Astronomy-based prediction methodology used by Wiggins and other prophets was weak "the observation, made since the Charleston earthquake, that E. Stone Wiggins, (that follower of Ananias) and other "prophets" had sprinkled their predictions so thickly along the meteorologic way, that it would be impossible for an earthquake or a storm to run amiss of one of them. " A. S. Hooker points out that Wiggins failed to predict the Charleston earthquake on 31 August 1886 or the aftershocks felt over a wide area of the United States in September, October and November. Wiggins also failed to predict a tornado which swept across the Gulf of Mexico on the 12th of October, 1886 which demolished the village of Sabine Pass, with a loss of 200 lives. A.S. Hooker notes that Wiggins changed his prediction for September 29, 1888, of a great storm of unparalleled violence which will sweep across the Atlantic Ocean and traverse the country until exhausting its energies by the Rocky Mountains to an earthquake in the Gulf of Mexico and Central America, nevertheless, the 29th was a calm day without storm or earthquake. Hooker advised that Wiggins had received notice to quit prophesying destructive storms, earthquakes and other natural disturbances, otherwise he will be dismissed from his position as a civil servant of the Dominion. Hooker wrote, "This is a great blow to Wiggins (not one that he prophesied), but a relief to those credulous, or nervously inclined. "

Wiggins, an amateur epidemiologist, theorized that the cause of a Yellow fever epidemic in Jacksonville, Florida, in 1888 as astronomical. "The planets were in the same line as the sun and earth and this produced, besides Cyclones, Earthquakes, etc., a denser atmosphere holding more carbon and creating Microbes. Mars had an uncommonly dense atmosphere, but its inhabitants were probably protected from the fever by their newly discovered canals, which were perhaps made to absorb carbon and prevent the disease. "

During an interview with The Times on December 7, 1888, Wiggins explained that he hoped the evidence from the eclipse of the Sun on 1 January 1899, would prove his theories, which he'd held since 1864. He theorized that the phosphere of the Sun is electricity, which repels and attracts comets through space by the law of like and unlike electricities. He believed that the coronal streamers are meteors carried through space on the trail of comets. He thought the ridges and lines on Mars observed through the Lick telescope were genuine Mars canals which had been excavated by the Martians for irrigation. He theorized that Encke comet must become a primary or secondary planet in a few years. If Encke comet became another moon to the Earth, Wiggins theorized that the oceans would raise 20 feet or more in a few hours. The flood would not only overwhelm both continents; Australia and the Gulf Stream would be no more. Wiggins theorized that floods and earthquakes are caused by dark or tailless comets, invisible through telescopes, passing near the Earth's surface.

Wiggins explained the discrepancies of the storms and earthquakes he predicted by his discovery of a dark second moon of the Earth, which he theorized deflected storms or interfered with earthquakes. The second satellite was termed dark because it eluded the telescopes or analytical spectroscopes of Astronomers.

On New Year's Day, 1889 Prof. Wiggins attended the Governor General of Canada reception at Ottawa. After being introduced to his Excellency The Marquess of Lansdowne and the Crown Ministers, Sir John A. Macdonald offered his hand, saying: "Why, Wiggins, you go by like a comet. " The professor replied: "Comets always go swiftly by the sun" and, later "He was greatly obliged to the Prime Minister for catching him at perihelion. "

Prof. Wiggins was asked to comment by The New York Times on November 24, 1892, on an alleged collision between the Earth and a comet, reported by Prof. Snyder of Philadelphia. Prof Wiggins stated that no such collision occurred on November 24, 1892, since there was no comet near the Earth at the time of the collision. Prof Wiggins theorized that a Comet could not collide with the Earth because planets and comets are electrically positive and therefore repel each other, "If a comet were to strike the earth it would smash the comet into meteoric dust in twenty minutes. "

Wiggins, a teacher, amateur meteorologist and his wife, writer Susie Anna Wiggins built Arbour House, (1892–93) a Designated Heritage Property 1994, as their summer home in Britannia. Currently housing the Arbour House Studios, the corner tower, shingled gables and irregular plan are typical of the Queen Anne Revival-style.

Property	Address	Ward	Construction Date	Architect	Photo	Plaque
Arbour House	84 Bradford Road	Bay	1892	Queen Anne Revival-style		

Wiggins, wrote a science fiction novel, Jack Suehard; or, Life on Jupiter in 1891 The title is "Jack Suehard"; or "Life on Jupiter" which considered what the people of the earth will be like at the end of the next twenty millions of years. It featured a "'stanlon,' a mirror twenty feet square, which is in every house and a conspicuous object in every street of their cities, " which provided instantaneous image transmission, essentially, "the Jovian newspaper, theatre, pulpit, and tribune. "

In 1893, Wiggins, predicted that the temperature in Canada was getting warmer in The Newmarket Era: "In time orange trees will blossom on the banks of the St. Lawrence River and the present products of the Dominion will flourish on the shores of Hudson Bay."

In 1895, Wiggins predicted in The Newmarket Era that the Great Lakes of North America are decreasing every year and the Niagara Falls will cease to be.

The 'Windsor Evening Record' reported on September 25, 1895, on popular feeling when the Wiggins weather predictions didn't come to pass, "Some people have lived in a state of great trepidation since the 17th, owing to the prophecy of E. Stone Wiggins, and now that the storm has failed to connect these people are kicking. Unhappy Wiggins."

In 1896, Wiggins claimed in the Newmarket Era that a tornado in St. Louis, Missouri, in 1896 was caused by the network of telegraph wires, and predicted that a similar fate would befall Canadian cities unless all wires were buried.

In 1897, he claimed that a meteorite that fell near Binghamton, New York, in November of that year contained a message from the inhabitants of the planet Mars in the form of hieroglyphs and advanced the theory that such messages had been sent before. He suggested that the Martians sent such meteorites to Earth by utilizing an "electric force", launching the projectiles towards passing comets which would draw the meteorite to Earth, or by launching the projectile into an orbit which would put it ahead of the Martian satellite Phobos, postulating that the "highly electrified" projectile would be repelled by Phobos with enough force to send it to Earth.

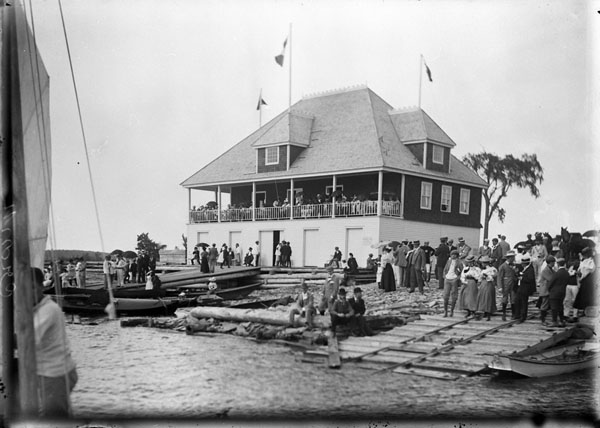
Britannia Boating Club now Britannia Yacht Club 1896

E. Stone Wiggins served as Commodore of the Britannia Bay Boathouse Club in 1899.

Society photographer William James Topley photographed Wiggins and his wife Mrs. E. Stone Wiggins in 1907.

Wiggins theorized that the cold and wet summer of 1909, resulted from an unrecognized satellite of the Earth

He died on August 14, 1910, in Arbour House, Britannia, at age 70. The couple's gravestone at St Luke Anglican Church Cemetery, Young's Cove Road, Queen's County, New Brunswick reads Professor E. Stone Wiggins B.A., M.A., M.D., L.L.D. Canada's Distinguished Scientist and Scholar. DEC. 4 1839—AUG. 14 1910. His wife Susie.

"The Un-Canadians", a 2007 article in Beaver Magazine, includes Ezekiel Stone Wiggins, Jeffery Amherst, 1st Baron Amherst, and Robert Monckton in a list of people in the history of Canada who were considered contemptible: "Civil servant and author Ezekiel Stone Wiggins manipulated the people's obsession with the weather and forecasted a storm that never came."

== Family ==
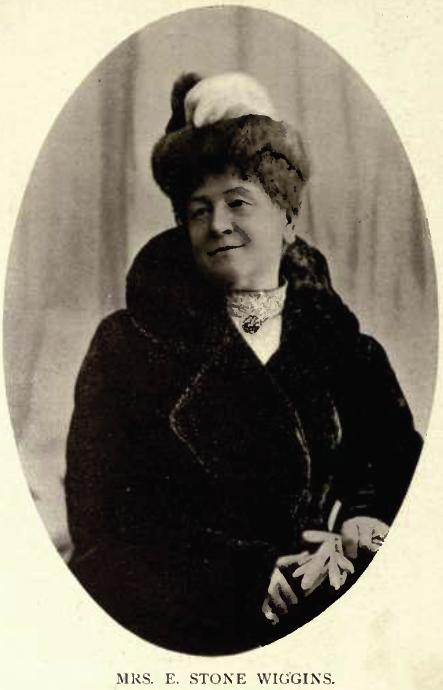
Mrs E Stone Wiggins by William James Topley

Susan Anna Wiggins was born on April 6, 1846. She was privately educated in Latin and Greek. At 16, she married her cousin, Ezekiel Stone Wiggins. Using her pen name of 'Gunhilda', Susan Anna was an author and poet.

In 1881, Susan Anna Wiggins used the nom de plume 'Gunhilda' to write the Gunhilda Letters—Marriage with a Deceased Husband's Sister: Letters of a Lady to [John Travers Lewis], the Right Rev. the Lord Bishop of Ontario, which consisted of letters of support for Mr. Girouard's bill regarding the legalization of marriage with a deceased wife's sister. The Gunhilda Letters were dedicated to the members of the Senate of Canada and of the House of Commons of Canada who supported Mr. Girouard's Bill. Nicholas Flood Davin complimented the Gunhilda letters "for felicity of expression, cogency of reasoning, fierceness of invective, keenness of satire and piquancy of style" and "Nothing equal to them has appeared in the Canadian press for years. "

Sir David Lewis Macpherson invited Susan Anna Wiggins to take a seat on his right, on the day that the 'Gunhilda' bill received its second reading in the Red Chamber, Parliament of Canada; This honour was previously only accorded to men or to the wife of a Governor General of Canada. The artist, F.A.T Dunbar sculpted a bust of Susan Anna Wiggins, which was placed in the Canadian Parliamentary Library at Ottawa.

Mrs. Wiggins wrote a biography of her husband, Prof. E. Stone Wiggins.

In 1903, Mrs. Wiggins was included in Henry James Morgan's Types of Canadian women and of women who are or have been connected with Canada: (Volume 1), which was published by Briggs, Toronto in 1903. She died on May 6, 1921. Her obituary read, 'At all events, let us honor her, and remember her, the lone woman great, intellectual, marvelously well-read and cultured, a woman, who in her own way, stirred Canada as few women have ever stirred her'. She was buried with her husband in St. Luke's Anglican Church Cemetery, Youngs Cove, Queens County, New Brunswick, Canada.

== Bibliography ==
- "Wiggins' storm herald, with almanac, 1883" by Ezekiel S Wiggins, Nepean, Ontario
- "Universalism unfounded being a complete analysis and refutation of the system" 1867 by Ezekiel S Wiggins, Nepean, Ontario
- "The architecture of the heavens containing a new theory of the universe and the extent of the deluge, and testimony of the Bible and geology in opposition to the views of Dr. Colenso" by Ezekiel S Wiggins 1864, Nepean, Ontario
- "The history of Queens County by Ezekiel S Wiggins, 1893, Nepean, Ontario
- The White family in New Brunswick: an historical sketch by Ezekiel Stone Wiggins, Saint John: The Watchman, 1903. AMICUS No. 11242420 monograph

== Electoral record ==
1878 Canadian federal election: Queen's
Party	Candidate	Votes
Liberal	George Gerald King	1,143
Liberal–Conservative	Ezekiel Stone Wiggins	630
