= Thomas White (Canadian politician) =

Canadian politician

The Honourable Thomas White PC
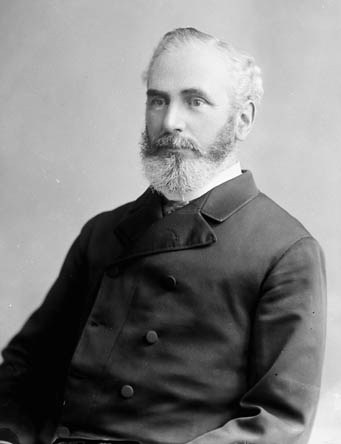

Member of the Canadian Parliament for Cardwell
- In office 1878–1888
- Preceded by: Dalton McCarthy
- Succeeded by: Robert Smeaton White

Personal details
- Born: August 7, 1830 Montreal, Lower Canada
- Died: April 21, 1888 (aged 57) Ottawa, Ontario, Canada
- Party: Conservative
- Children: Robert Smeaton White
- Cabinet: Minister of the Interior (1885–1888); Superintendent-General of Indian Affairs (1887–1888)

Thomas White, PC (August 7, 1830 – April 21, 1888) was a Canadian journalist and politician.

== Life ==
He was born in Montreal, Lower Canada in 1830, the son of Thomas White, a leather merchant who came to Canada from Ireland in 1826. White was educated at the High School of Montreal after it opened in 1843, then worked at a number of jobs before entering the printing trade with the Queen's Printer in Toronto around 1850. He moved to Quebec City in 1851 when that office moved there. In 1852, he assisted Stewart Derbishire in editing the Canada Gazette. He married Esther Vine at Quebec in 1853. Later that year, he founded the Peterborough Review with his brother-in-law. He also served as reeve of Peterborough. From 1860 to 1864, he studied law with Sidney Smith at Cobourg but soon returned to journalism. In 1864, he moved to Hamilton and took over the operation of the Daily Spectator and Journal of Commerce. In 1870, with his brother Richard, he bought the Montreal Gazette.

White was first elected to the House of Commons of Canada in the 1878 elections representing the riding of Cardwell. A Conservative, he was re-elected in 1882 and 1887. He served in two ministerial positions in 1887 and in 1888: Minister of the Interior and Superintendent-General of Indian Affairs.

White died of pneumonia in Ottawa in 1888. His son Robert Smeaton White also served in the House of Commons.
