= James Alway Ross =

Canadian politician, businessman, and poet

- Born: January 13, 1869; St Anns, Ontario
- Died: May 22, 1945 (aged 76); St. Catharines General Hospital
- Occupations: Canadian politician, business person, and poet
- Organization: Canadian Writers' Association
- Spouse: Sarah Agnes Kay

James Alway Ross (January 13, 1869 – May 22, 1945) was a Canadian politician, businessperson and poet. He represented Monck in the Legislative Assembly of Ontario from 1908 to 1911 as a Conservative.

The son of William Nelson Ross and Lydia Tufford, he was born in St Anns, Ontario and grew up there. Ross taught in the model school in Welland and then at Wellandport. He was principal at Scott Street School in St. Thomas when he resigned in 1896 to go into business.

In 1893, he married Sarah Agnes Kay.

He was elected to the Ontario assembly for Monck in 1908.

A member of the Canadian Writers' Association, he was the author of a volume of poetry which included poems such as "Canada First" and "Dominion Day".

Ross died in St. Catharines General Hospital at the age of 76, after being ill for three months.

His son Murray G. Ross was founding president of York University.
