= Monck (federal electoral district) =

Former federal electoral district in Ontario, Canada

Monck was a federal electoral district in the Canadian province of Ontario, which was represented in the House of Commons of Canada from 1867 to 1892. It is sometimes also considered one of Ontario's historic counties, as it was listed in some post-Confederation census records as a county of residence.

Monck consisted of the Lincoln County townships of Caistor and Gainsborough, the Haldimand County townships of Canborough, Dunn, Dunnville, Moulton and Sherbrooke, and the Welland County townships of Pelham and Wainfleet.

In 1872, it was redefined to include the Township of Dunn (Haldimand). In 1882, it was redefined to include the Township of South Cayuga and exclude the Township of Caistor.

The electoral district was abolished in 1892 when it was redistributed between Haldimand and Monck and Lincoln and Niagara ridings.

== Members of Parliament ==
This riding has elected the following members of Parliament:

Parliament	Years	Member	Party
1st	1867–1872	Lachlin McCallum	Liberal–Conservative
2nd	1872–1874	James David Edgar	Liberal
3rd	1874–1875	Lachlin McCallum	Liberal–Conservative
3rd	1875–1878	Lachlin McCallum	Liberal–Conservative
4th	1878–1882	Lachlin McCallum	Liberal–Conservative
5th	1882–1887	Lachlin McCallum	Liberal–Conservative
6th	1887–1891	Arthur Boyle	Conservative
7th	1891–1892	John Brown	Liberal
7th	1892–1896	Arthur Boyle	Conservative
Riding dissolved into Haldimand and Monck and Lincoln and Niagara

== Electoral history ==
1867 Canadian federal election
Party	Candidate	Votes
Liberal–Conservative	Lachlin McCallum	1,126
Unknown	Dr. Frazer	871
Eligible voters		2,539
Source: Canadian Parliamentary Guide, 1871

1872 Canadian federal election
Party	Candidate	Votes
Liberal	James David Edgar	1,334
Liberal–Conservative	Lachlin McCallum	1,293
Source: Canadian Elections Database

1874 Canadian federal election
Party	Candidate	Votes
Liberal–Conservative	Lachlin McCallum	1,354
Liberal	James David Edgar	1,320
lop.parl.ca

By-election on 22 June 1875 Due to unseating of Lachlin McCallum, 12 May 1875
Party	Candidate	Votes
Liberal–Conservative	Lachlin McCallum	1,333
Liberal	James David Edgar	1,329

1878 Canadian federal election
Party	Candidate	Votes
Liberal–Conservative	Lachlin McCallum	1,459
Liberal	James David Edgar	1,431

1882 Canadian federal election
Party	Candidate	Votes
Liberal–Conservative	Lachlin McCallum	1,445
Unknown	George A. McCallum	1,420

1887 Canadian federal election
Party	Candidate	Votes
Conservative	Arthur Boyle	1,816
Liberal	George A. McCallum	1,718

1891 Canadian federal election
Party	Candidate	Votes
Liberal	John Brown	1,874
Conservative	Arthur Boyle	1,614

By-election on 12 March 1892 Due to unseating of John Brown
Party	Candidate	Votes
Conservative	Arthur Boyle	acclaimed

== See also ==
- List of Canadian electoral districts
- Historical federal electoral districts of Canada
