= Robert Smeaton White =

Canadian politician & journalist (1856–1944)

Member of the Canadian Parliament for Cardwell
- In office 1888–1895
- Preceded by: Thomas White
- Succeeded by: William Stubbs

Member of the Canadian Parliament for Mount Royal
- In office 1925–1935
- Preceded by: District was created in 1924
- Succeeded by: William Allen Walsh

Member of the Canadian Parliament for Saint-Antoine—Westmount
- In office 1935–1940
- Preceded by: District was created in 1933
- Succeeded by: Douglas Abbott

Personal details
- Born: 15 March 1856 Peterborough, Canada West
- Died: 5 December 1944 (aged 88) Westmount, Quebec
- Party: Conservative
- Occupation: Civil Servant
- Profession: Journalist

Robert Smeaton White (15 March 1856 – 5 December 1944) was a Canadian journalist and political figure, and civil servant. In the House of Commons of the Parliament of Canadahe represented Cardwell from 1888 to 1895, Mount Royal from 1925 to 1935 and Saint-Antoine—Westmount from 1935 to 1940 as a Conservative member. He was a civil servant for almost 22 years, serving as Montreal's Collector of Customs from 1896 to 1917. He was a journalist, and became the editor of The Gazette in 1917, and remained in that position until he ran for political office again in 1925. He died at his home in Westmont, Quebec in late 1944.

== Personal life ==
He was born in Peterborough, Canada West in 1856, the son of Thomas White and Esther Vine. His post-secondary education was at McGill University. In 1882, he married Ruth McDougall. In 1888, he married Annie Barclay after the death of his first wife. His second wife pre-deceased him on 20 October 1944. He died in Westmount on 5 December 1944, at the age of 88.

== Journalism career ==
He worked for a wholesale merchant in Montreal and then the Bank of Montreal, before joining The Gazette in 1884 as a "cub" or inexperienced journalist. White later became chief editor for the paper in 1917.

== Political career ==
He was first elected to the House of Commons of Canada in the 3 October 1888 by-election held in the southern Ontario Cardwell electoral district. The by-election occurred because the electoral district's member of parliament, his father, died in office.

He resigned his seat in October 1895, because the Conservative government was about to table legislation related to the Manitoba Schools Question, which he objected to (funding for minority separate schools).

In the mid-1920s, he again entered federal politics and won election to the House of Commons from the Montreal electoral district of Mount Royal. White was the Doyen, or Dean, of the House of Commons when he ran unsuccessfully as a member of the National Government Party in Saint-Antoine—Westmount in 1940.

== Civil service career ==
Soon after his October 1895 resignation from parliament, newspapers speculated that he would be appointed by the federal government to the position of Collector of Customs at Montreal. The federal cabinet, by an Order in Council, appointed him Collector of Customs at Montreal on 31 December 1895. He was sworn in on 4 January 1896.
