= Alexander Augustus Williamson Carscallen =

Canadian politician

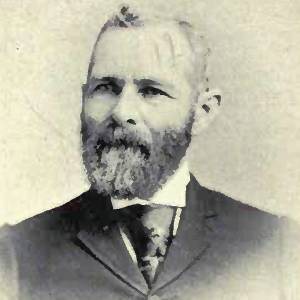
Alexander Augustus Williamson Carscallen

Alexander Augustus Williamson Carscallen (October 14, 1844 – February 13, 1907) was a banker and political figure in Ontario. He represented Hastings North in the House of Commons of Canada from 1892 to 1904 as a Conservative member.

He was born in North Fredericksburg Township, Lennox County, Canada West, the son of Edward Riggs Carscallen, and was educated in Napanee and at the University of Nashville. He established himself in business in Marmora, Ontario. In 1874, Carscallen married Marcia Pringle. He was a justice of the peace, a member of the North Fredericksburg township council and township reeve, and chairman of the school board. Carscallen was first elected to the House of Commons in an 1892 by-election held after Mackenzie Bowell was named to the Canadian senate. He was reelected in 1896 and 1900. In 1903, the riding of Hastings North was redistributed into Hastings West and Hastings East; Carscallen did not run in 1904. He died in Belleville at the age of 62.
