= Dalton McCarthy =

Canadian lawyer and politician (1836–1898)

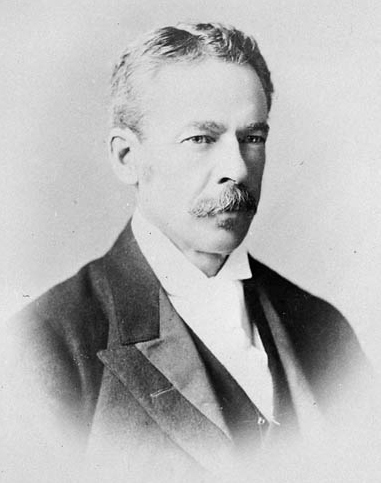

Member of the Canadian Parliament for Cardwell
- In office 1876–1878
- Preceded by: John Hillyard Cameron
- Succeeded by: Thomas White

Member of the Canadian Parliament for Simcoe North
- In office 1878–1898
- Preceded by: Hermon Henry Cook
- Succeeded by: Leighton McCarthy

Personal details
- Born: October 10, 1836 Oakley Park, Blackrock (Ireland)
- Died: May 11, 1898 (aged 61) Toronto, Ontario

Dalton McCarthy (October 10, 1836 – May 11, 1898), or D'Alton McCarthy, was a Canadian lawyer and parliamentarian. He was the leader of the "Orange" or Protestant Irish Canadians, and fiercely fought against Irish Catholics as well as the French Catholics. He especially crusaded for the abolition of the French language in schools in Manitoba and Ontario.

== Legal career ==
McCarthy started his legal career in 1858 at Boulton & McCarthy, a law firm in Barrie co-founded by his father, also named D'Alton. He and his father left that partnership 1869 to start their own law firm, and his father died in 1873. He opened a law office in Toronto in 1876, was joined by prominent litigator Britton Bath Osler in 1882. The successful legal practice McCarthy and Osler built under the name McCarthy, Osler, Hoskin & Creelman would be the ancestor of two of the "Seven Sisters," the most prominent national law firms in Canada: McCarthy Tétrault and Osler, Hoskin & Harcourt. He appeared in the Supreme Court of Canada in the significant constitutional case of Citizens Insurance Co of Canada v Parsons, arguing successfully on behalf of two individuals claiming compensation under fire insurance policies. The case helped establish the scope of provincial jurisdiction in contract matters. He also defended Emily Stowe in the 1879 abortion trial of Emily Stowe.

== Political career ==
McCarthy entered politics in the federal election of 1872 as the Conservative candidate in Simcoe North (which included Barrie until 1903). He was defeated by Liberal Hermon Henry Cook, a millionaire lumber merchant, by 56 votes out of 3700. He challenged the election results at the urging of party leader and prime minister Sir John A. Macdonald. His challenge was unsuccessful, but it started a bond with Macdonald that led him to become one of Macdonald's key protégées and allies. In 1873 he took on the presidency of the Simcoe conservative association, and married his late wife's sister, who was also widow of Macdonald's brother-in-law, thus making the bond familial. He lost the 1874 election again to Cook, this time by 154 votes out of 4400, but contested the result successfully, and lost to Cook for a third time in the by-election that followed. Despite three consecutive losses, McCarthy threw himself into the 1875 provincial election as the local conservative association president, securing a conservative sweep in Simcoe County in a year where the Liberals increased their majority with gains in areas south and west of Simcoe.

When the MP for neighboring district Cardwell died in 1876, Macdonald handed the nomination to McCarthy and dispatched Charles Tupper, a key ally and his best campaigner, to canvass the riding with McCarthy. He won the seat, and McCarthy joined Mcdonald in the opposition party, using the oratory skills he honed in the courtroom. When MacDonald returned to power in 1878, McCarthy was finally triumphant in Simcoe North with a winning margin of 50 votes out of over 5,000.

He also became the Conservatives' principal counsel in Ontario for elections related dispute, a lucrative business as election results were more often contested then. As a forceful advocate for a greater authority for the central government, he emerged as a leading spokesman on legal and jurisdictional matters in both Parliament and in legal cases. Despite losing three important appeals at the Judicial Committee of the Privy Council in London where federal authority was challenged by the Ontario Liberal government, he continued to enjoyed the confidence of Macdonald, who offered him the justice portfolio more than once. He declined as his debt load required him to continue his legal work, but in truth he was increasingly feeling out of step with his conservative colleagues over his views on confederation.

An Irish-born Protestant, McCarthy was antipathetic toward French Canadians. His contemporaries respected his organizational skills and perceived him as a potential Conservative leader after Prime Minister Sir John A. Macdonald vacated the leadership. However, he broke with the Conservatives in the 1890s, running and being re-elected as an Independent Member of Parliament (MP) in the 1891 Canadian federal election. He appears to have been associated with the Equal Rights Party which ran in that election but did not run as their candidate.

McCarthy was a founder of the "Imperial Federation League", which proposed uniting the United Kingdom and the emerging dominions under a central Cabinet government responsible to an Imperial Parliament elected from throughout the Empire. McCarthy organized his own slate of McCarthyite candidates for the 1896 election, but he was the only one elected.

Following the 1896 election, McCarthy forged an alliance with the Liberal Party, even though its leader Wilfrid Laurier was a French Canadian Catholic. He might have been appointed to cabinet had he not died following a carriage accident in 1898.

McCarthy was a key figure in the Manitoba Schools Question, and a major proponent of English monolingualism in the legislatures, courts, and schools of Western Canada.

== Archives ==
There is a Dalton McCarthy fonds at Library and Archives Canada. Archival reference number is R4370.
