= John Ferris (New Brunswick politician) =

Canadian politician

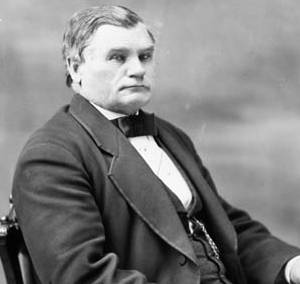
John Ferris Source: Library and Archives Canada

John Ferris (January 9, 1811 – November 3, 1884) was a New Brunswick businessman, explorer and political figure. He represented Queen's in the House of Commons of Canada as a Liberal member from 1867 to 1878. His surname also appears as Farris in some sources, such as the 1881 census.

He was born in Cambridge, Queen's County, New Brunswick in early 1811, the son of John Ferris. Ferris was a lumber merchant and farmer. He represented Queen's County in the Legislative Assembly of New Brunswick from 1844 to 1864 and from 1866 to 1867. Ferris died in Cambridge at the age of 73.

1867 Canadian federal election: Queen's
Party	Candidate	Votes
Liberal	John Ferris	acclaimed
Source: Canadian Elections Database

1872 Canadian federal election: Queen's
Party	Candidate	Votes
Liberal	John Ferris	621
Unknown	Amasa Coy	135
Unknown	V.W. Wiggins	30

1874 Canadian federal election: Queen's
Party	Candidate	Votes
Liberal	John Ferris	621
Unknown	Amasa Coy	135
Unknown	V.W. Wiggins	30
Source: lop.parl.ca
