= Robert Johnston (Canadian politician) =

Canadian politician

Robert Johnston (November 21, 1856 – September 25, 1913) was a farmer and political figure in Ontario, Canada. He represented Cardwell in the House of Commons of Canada from 1900 to 1904 as a Conservative.

He was born in Caledon Township, Canada West, the son of Robert Johnston and Margaret J. McFarland, and was educated in Peel County. Johnston served as warden for Peel County. He was a farmer in Caledon Township. He died in Brampton at the age of 56.
