= George Frederick Baird =

Canadian politician and lawyer

Member of Parliament for Queen's
- In office 1887–1888
- Preceded by: George G. King
- Succeeded by: George Frederick Baird
- In office 1888–1891
- Preceded by: George G. King
- Succeeded by: George G. King
- In office 1892–1896
- Preceded by: George G. King
- Succeeded by: George G. King

Personal details
- Born: September 5, 1851 Wickham, New Brunswick
- Died: April 29, 1899 (aged 47)
- Party: Conservative
- Profession: lawyer

George Frederick Baird (September 5, 1851 – April 29, 1899) was a Canadian politician and lawyer, having studied in the firm of Charles Nelson Skinner.

Baird was born in Wickham, New Brunswick. After studying law he entered the shipping business, and was the leading force in establishing steamship service between Saint John and the Caribbean. He also ran steamship lines on the St. John River. He was elected to the House of Commons of Canada in 1887 to represent the riding of Queen's. He was re-elected in a by-election in 1888, defeated in 1891, and then re-elected in another by-election in 1892. Previous to his federal political career, he was an alderman in Saint John, New Brunswick for two years.

His former home at 269-271 Germain Street in Saint John has been declared an historic site.

== Electoral record ==
1887 Canadian federal election: Queen's
Party	Candidate	Votes
Liberal	George Gerald King	1,191
Conservative	George Frederick Baird	1,130

By-election: On Mr. Baird's resignation because his election was contested, 24 November 1887

By-election on 18 January 1888
Party	Candidate	Votes
Conservative	George Frederick Baird	1,175
Liberal	George Gerald King	1,064

N.B. The Canadian Directory of Parliament states that George Frederick Baird was declared duly elected by a court decision.

1891 Canadian federal election: Queen's
Party	Candidate	Votes
Liberal	George Gerald King	1,233
Conservative	George Frederick Baird	1,204

By-election: On Mr. King being declared not duly elected, 25 February 1892, George Frederick Baird was declared elected by a court decision.

By-election on 25 February 1892
Party	Candidate	Votes
Conservative	BAIRD, George Frederick

== See also ==
- List of federal by-elections in Canada
