= McCarthyites (Canada) =

The McCarthyites were a short-lived anti-Catholic and anti-French Canadian political movement which contested the 23 June 1896 federal election in Canada. The McCarthyite movement and the Patrons of Industry represented the first challenge to the two-party system in Canada.

Dalton McCarthy was the only "McCarthyite" to win election (he contested and won two seats), and the movement disbanded in 1898, not long after his death.

== Formation and political platform ==
Dalton McCarthy, an Irish-born lawyer, first ran as a Conservative in Simcoe North in the 1872 election. He served as the Member of Parliament for Cardwell from an 1876 by-election. He returned to Simcoe North for the 1878 Canadian federal election; he was elected there, then re-elected in 1882 and 1887. Seen as a protégé of Prime Minister John A. Macdonald and "the 'brains of the party'", McCarthy was seen as "a logical successor to leadership". However, in 1891, McCarthy left the Conservative Party after disagreements with its leader, and ran and won as an independent.

McCarthy was notoriously anti-Catholic and anti-French Canadian. He was a founder of the Canadian branch of the Imperial Federation League, a group that sought to unite Britain and its colonies and dominions in a trans-global federation.

McCarthy also appears to have been associated with the Equal Rights Party, although he did not run under its banner in the 1891 election.

== The 1896 election ==
In 1896, McCarthy and nine of his supporters presented themselves for election in ridings in Ontario and Manitoba. At the time, candidates could present their names for election in more than one riding at a time.

McCarthy sought election and won in both Simcoe North, Ontario, and Brandon, Manitoba. Having won re-election in Simcoe North, McCarthy resigned the Brandon seat.

McCarthyite candidates polled second in three other Ontario ridings, Lanark South, Hastings North and Durham East, scoring over 40% of the vote in each case.

In Muskoka and Parry Sound, McCarthyite candidate William Edward O'Brien, who had previously served as a Tory MP, won 20.1% of the vote in a three-way race. In the other ridings, the McCarthyites did poorly, winning about 10% of the vote or less.

Across all ridings, McCarthyites collected a total of 12,861 votes, or 28.1% of the popular vote.

McCarthy and his candidates were supported by the Protestant Protective Association, though McCarthy publicly repudiated the support, saying his League "had 'nothing whatever to do'" with an internal PPA policy to nominate their members as McCarthyite candidates.

== Post-election ==
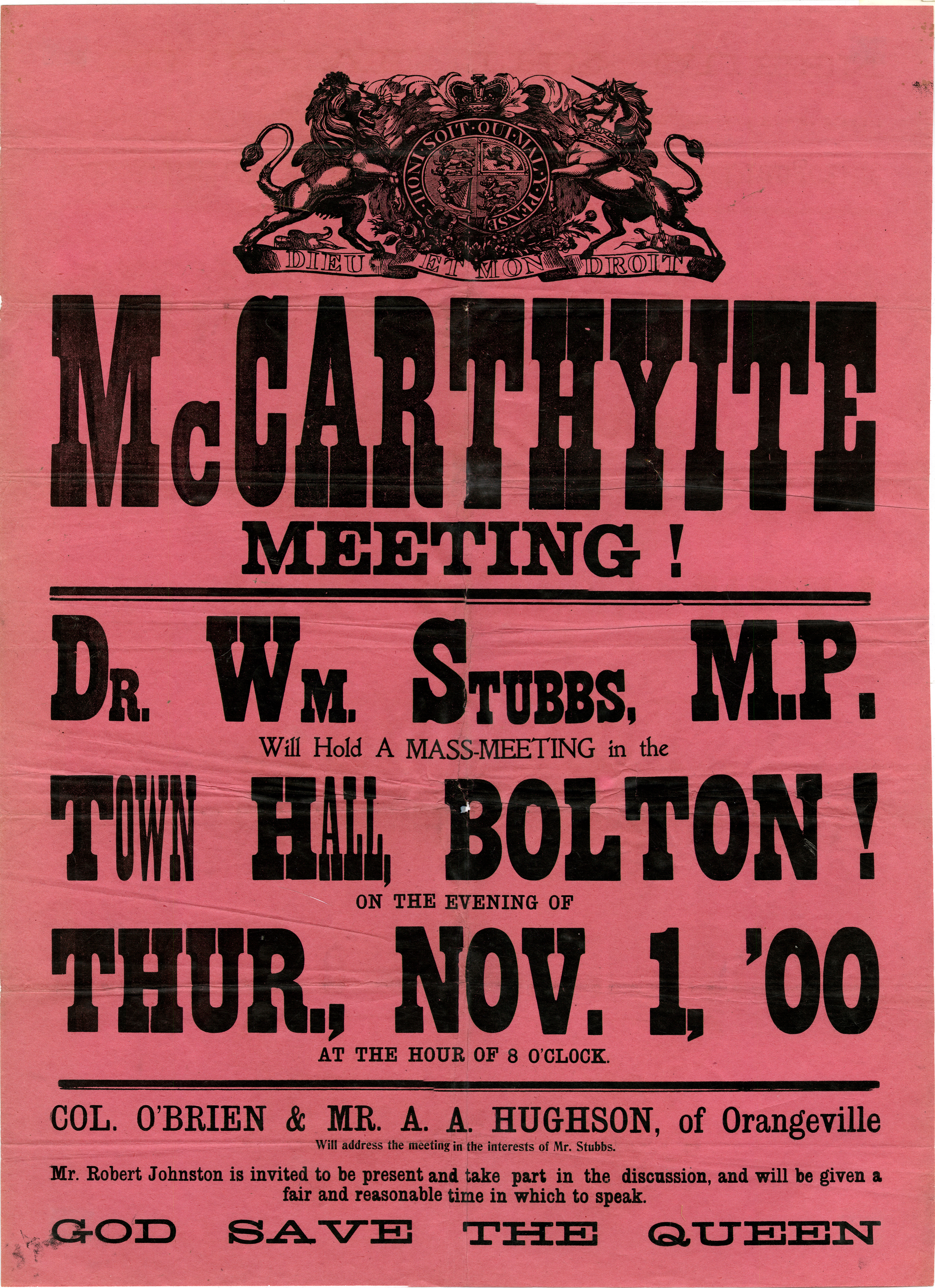
McCarthyite meeting poster for the riding of Cardwell, 1900.

As the only elected McCarthyite, Dalton McCarthy forged an alliance with Wilfrid Laurier's Liberals, even though Laurier was a French Canadian Catholic. This alliance began during the election, as the McCarthyites made arrangements with the Liberal Party and the Patrons of Industry in some Southern Ontario ridings to avoid vote splitting among anti-Conservative voters. He might have been appointed to cabinet had he not died following a carriage accident in early 1898. His son, Leighton McCarthy, won a by-election to succeed his father.

His followers attempted to revive the party and pursue McCarthy's anti-Catholic theme, but were unsuccessful. The party was formally disbanded in the same year.

== See also ==
- List of political parties in Canada
