= Arthur Boyle =

Canadian politician

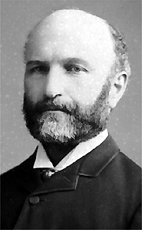

Member of the Canadian Parliament for Monck
- In office 1887–1891
- Preceded by: Lachlin McCallum
- Succeeded by: John Brown
- In office 1892–1892
- Preceded by: John Brown
- Succeeded by: Riding redistributed between Haldimand and Monck and Lincoln and Niagara

Personal details
- Born: 1840 or 1841 Thorold, Canada West
- Died: December 10, 1919 (aged 78) Niagara Falls, Ontario
- Party: Conservative Party
- Occupation: Grocer

Arthur Boyle (1840/1841 – December 10, 1919) was a politician and grocer. He was elected to the House of Commons of Canada in 1887 as a Member of the Conservative Party to represent the riding of Monck. He was defeated by John Brown in the 1891 election, but was acclaimed back into office in 1892 after Brown was unseated. He then continued to represent the riding until its abolition in 1896.

In 1868, he married Annie E. Cormick. Boyle was reeve of Dunnville from 1877 to 1879 and was warden for Haldimand County from 1878 to 1879. He ran unsuccessfully for a seat in the Legislative Assembly of Ontario in the 1886 provincial election.

Arthur Boyle died at his home in Niagara Falls, Ontario on December 10, 1919.

== Electoral record ==
1887 Canadian federal election: Monck
Party	Candidate	Votes
Conservative	Arthur Boyle	1,816
Liberal	George A. McCallum	1,718

1891 Canadian federal election: Monck
Party	Candidate	Votes
Liberal	John Brown	1,874
Conservative	Arthur Boyle	1,614

By-election on 12 March 1892 Due to unseating of John Brown
Party	Candidate	Votes
Conservative	Arthur Boyle	acclaimed
