= 1896 Canadian federal election =

- June 23, 1896

213 seats in the House of Commons 107 seats needed for a majority
- Turnout: 62.9% (▼1.5 pp)
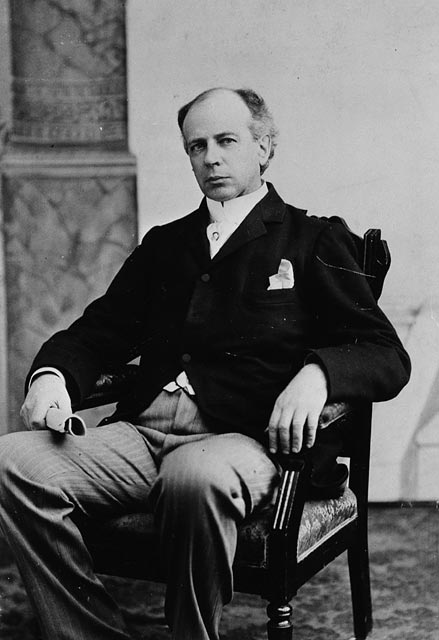

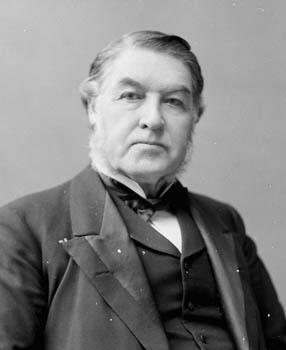
	First party	Second party
Leader	Wilfrid Laurier	Charles Tupper
Party	Liberal	Conservative
Leader since	June 2, 1887	May 1, 1896
Leader's seat	Quebec East (Note: Laurier was also elected in Saskatchewan (Provisional District); he chose to sit for Quebec East instead, and resigned as the Member of Parliament for Saskatchewan (Provisional District).)	Cape Breton
Last election	90 seats, 45.2%	117 seats, 48.6%
Seats won	117	86
Seat change	▲27	▼31
Popular vote	401,425	467,415
Percentage	41.4%	48.2%
Swing	▼3.8 pp	▼0.4 pp
- 1896 Canadian electoral map

- The Canadian parliament after the 1896 election
Prime Minister before election
Charles Tupper
Conservative
Prime Minister after election
Wilfrid Laurier
Liberal

The 1896 Canadian federal election was held on June 23, 1896, to elect members of the House of Commons of Canada of the 8th Parliament of Canada. Though the Conservative Party, led by Prime Minister Charles Tupper, won a plurality of the popular vote, the Liberal Party, led by Wilfrid Laurier, won the majority of seats (with only 41 per cent of the vote) to form the next government. The election ended 18 years of Conservative rule. Laurier became the first leader of a political party to win an election after losing in their first bid, a feat only accomplished otherwise by Stephen Harper in 2006.

This was first election in Canada to produce a House of Commons with elected members of four parties. The Liberals and Conservative shared the chamber with elected members of the farmer-based Patrons of Industry and McCarthyites.

== Description ==
The governing Conservative Party, since the death of John A. Macdonald in 1891, was disorganized. Following Macdonald's death, John Abbott spent a year as prime minister before handing over to John Thompson. Thompson proved a relatively popular prime minister, but his sudden death in December 1894 resulted in his replacement by Mackenzie Bowell, whose tenure as prime minister proved a disaster. The Conservatives soon became viewed as corrupt and wasteful of public funds, partially due to the McGreevy-Langevin Scandal. Issues like the Manitoba Schools Question had cost the party support in both French and English Canada.

Though Bowell nominally remained prime minister until the election was called, leadership of the Conservative Party had been functionally taken over by Sir Charles Tupper, a Father of Confederation and former premier of Nova Scotia. Earlier, in February 1896, Tupper introduced remedial legislation to settle the Manitoba dispute, but it was filibustered by the McCarthyites, an alliance of extreme Protestants led by Dalton McCarthy, and the Liberals. This filibuster resulted in Tupper abandoning the bill and asking for a dissolution. Parliament was dissolved on April 24, 1896, and, in accordance with an agreement between Bowell and Tupper that the latter would become prime minister following the election call, he became prime minister on May 1, 1896, thus forming the 7th Canadian Ministry.

Tupper argued that the real issue of the election was the future of Canadian industry, and he insisted that Conservatives needed to unite to defeat the Patrons of Industry. However, the Conservatives were so bitterly divided over the Manitoba Schools Question that wherever he spoke, he was faced with a barrage of criticism, most notably at a two-hour address he gave at Massey Hall in Toronto, which was constantly interrupted by the crowd.

The election saw a great change in the Liberal Party. While the Liberals had traditionally been the party for radical change and free trade, in the 1896 election, they embraced a much more conservative platform. That helped many of the traditional supporters of the Conservative Party move to the Liberals. The most important change was Laurier's support of the National Policy, an important cause to the powerful business interests of Montreal and Toronto. The Liberal campaign was directed by an ex-Conservative, Joseph Israël Tarte. Laurier was also a strong supporter of provincial rights, and a number of powerful Liberal premiers supported the campaign, such as Ontario's Oliver Mowat and Nova Scotia's W. S. Fielding, both of whom who won seats in the House and were appointed to cabinet after the election.

The Conservatives won more votes in the 1896 election than the Liberals (48.2% of the votes in comparison to 41.4% for the Liberals). However, the Liberals took more seats. The Conservatives captured about half of the seats in English Canada. They suffered losses in Quebec, where Tupper's reputation as an ardent imperialist was a major handicap. Tupper's inability to persuade Joseph-Adolphe Chapleau to return to active politics as his Quebec lieutenant ended any chances of the Conservatives winning the most seats that province. Meanwhile, Laurier's Liberals won a landslide victory in Quebec, as well as getting some seats in English Canada (especially in the Maritimes and the West).

Tupper initially refused to resign as prime minister, insisting that Laurier would be unable to form a government. However, when Tupper attempted to make appointments as prime minister, Governor General Lord Aberdeen refused. Tupper resigned, and the governor general invited Laurier to form a government.

== National results ==

Party	Party leader	# of candidates	Seats			Popular vote		
Party	Party leader	# of candidates	1891	Elected	Change	#	%	Change
Liberal	Wilfrid Laurier	190	90	117	+30.0%	401,425	41.37%	-3.85pp
Conservative	Charles Tupper	190	97	71	-16.9%	430,874	44.40%	+1.44pp
Liberal-Conservative	Charles Tupper	17	20	15	-25%	36,541	3.77%	-1.85pp
Nationalist		5	1	-	-100%	14,121	1.46%	+1.46pp
Independent Conservative		4	3	4	+33.3%	12,209	1.26%	-0.68pp
Patrons of Industry		31	*	2	*	38,275	3.94%	*
McCarthyite	Dalton McCarthy	11	*	2	*	12,861	1.33%	*
Independent		18	2	1	-50%	13,870	1.43%	+0.61pp
Independent Liberal		1	1	1	-	2,353	0.24%	-0.48pp
Nationalist Conservative		-	1	-	-100%	-	-	-
Protestant Protective		5	*	-	*	6,233	0.64%	*
Unknown		1	-	-	-	1,622	0.17%	-2.01pp
Total		473	215	213	+7.0%	970,384	100%	
Sources: http://www.elections.ca -- History of Federal Ridings since 1867

Note:

* Party did not nominate candidates in the previous election.

Acclamations:

The following Members of Parliament were elected by acclamation;

- Ontario: 1 Patron of Industry
- Quebec: 1 Conservative, 2 Liberals

== Results by province ==
Party name		BC	NWT	MB	ON	QC	NB	NS	PE	Total
Liberal	Seats:	3	3	2	43	49	4	10	2	117
Liberal	Popular vote (%):	51.2	46.0	31.0	40.5	53.8	42.5	31.9	51.0	41.4
Conservative	Seats:	2	1	3	34	16	4	9	2	71
Conservative	Vote (%):	48.8	43.9	45.1	40.9	45.2	31.5	65.4	40.5	44.4
Liberal-Conservative	Seats:			1	7	-	5	1	1	15
Liberal-Conservative	Vote (%):			8.0	4.0	0.4	17.5	2.2	8.5	2.2
Nationalist	Seats:	1*			-	-				-
Nationalist	Vote (%):				3.2	0.5				1.5
Independent Conservative	Seats:				4					4
Independent Conservative	Vote (%):				3.0					1.3
Patrons of Industry	Seats:				2					2
Patrons of Industry	Vote (%):			7.6	8.3	0.7				3.9
McCarthyite	Seats:			1	1					2
McCarthyite	Vote (%):			8.3	2.4					1.3
Independent	Seats:		-		-		1	-		1
Independent	Vote (%):		10.0		1.4		8.6	0.5		1.4
Independent Liberal	Seats:				1					1
Independent Liberal	Vote (%):				0.6					0.2
Total seats		6	4	7	92	65	14	20	5	213
Parties that won no seats:
Protestant Protective	Vote (%):				1.5					0.6
Unknown	Vote (%):				0.4					0.2

- George Ritchie Maxwell elected in Burrard.

== See also ==
- List of Canadian federal general elections
- List of political parties in Canada
- 8th Canadian Parliament
