= List of Canadian minor party and independent politicians elected =

- House of Commons: 2 / 338

This is a list of members of the House of Commons of Canada who were elected as an independent or as a member of a minor political party. Excluded are MPs who were elected from a major party but then defected during a parliamentary term.

== Federal elections ==
=== 1867–1916 ===
Election	Member of Parliament	Constituency	Party/description
1868 (b)	John Pickard	York	Independent Liberal
1870 (b)	Georges Isidore Barthe	Richelieu	Independent Conservative
1871 (b)	Donald Alexander Smith	Selkirk	Independent Conservative
1872	William Gibson	Dundas	Independent Liberal
1872	Peter Mitchell	Northumberland	Independent
1872	Ulysse-Janvier Robillard	Beauharnois	Independent Conservative
1872	John Pickard	York	Independent Liberal
1872	Donald A. Smith	Selkirk	Independent Conservative
1873 (b)	Louis Riel	Provencher	Independent
1874	Georges Isidore Barthe	Richelieu	Independent Conservative
1874	James Lyons Biggar	Northumberland East	Independent Liberal
1874	William Gibson	Dundas	Independent Liberal
1874	Alfred Gilpin Jones	Halifax	Independent
1874	George McLeod	Kent	Independent
1874	Peter Mitchell	Northumberland	Independent
1874	John Pickard	York	Independent Liberal
1874	Patrick Power	Halifax	Independent Liberal
1874	Louis Riel	Provencher	Independent
1874	Ulysse-Janvier Robillard	Beauharnois	Independent Conservative
1874	Francis James Roscoe	Victoria	Independent Liberal
1874	Donald A. Smith	Selkirk	Independent Conservative
1874 (b)	Louis Riel	Provencher	Independent
1874 (b)	James Lyons Biggar	Northumberland East	Independent Liberal
1875 (b)	Samuel Platt	Toronto East	Independent
1875 (b)	Thomas Greenway	Huron South	Independent
1875 (b)	Charles Auguste Maximilien Globensky	Two Mountains	Independent
1877 (b)	Jacques Malouin	Quebec-Centre	Independent
1877 (b)	François Xavier Ovide Méthot	Nicolet	Independent Conservative
1878 (b)	George Haddow	Restigouche	Independent
1878 (b)	Alfred Gilpin Jones	Halifax	Independent
1878 (b)	Peter Mitchell	Northumberland	Independent
1878 (b)	Thomas Robert McInnes	New Westminster	Independent
1878	George Heber Connell	Carleton	Independent
1878	George Haddow	Restigouche	Independent
1878	Frédéric Houde	Maskinongé	Nationalist Conservative
1878	Jacques Malouin	Quebec-Centre	Independent
1878	Thomas Robert McInnes	New Westminster	Independent
1878	François Xavier Ovide Méthot	Nicolet	Independent Conservative
1878	John Pickard	York	Independent Liberal
1878	Samuel Platt	Toronto East	Independent
1881 (b)	Darius Crouter	Northumberland East	Independent Liberal
1882	Michel Auger	Shefford	Independent Liberal
1882	Frédéric Houde	Maskinongé	Nationalist Conservative
1882	François Xavier Ovide Méthot	Nicolet	Independent Conservative
1882	Peter Mitchell	Northumberland	Independent
1882	John Pickard	York	Independent Liberal
1882 (b)	Édouard Guilbault	Joliette	Independent Conservative
1884 (b)	Athanase Gaudet	Nicolet	Nationalist Conservative
1887	Guillaume Amyot	Bellechasse	Nationalist
1887	Joseph Gédéon Horace Bergeron	Beauharnois	Independent Conservative
1887	Paul Couture	Chicoutimi—Saguenay	Independent
1887	Alphonse Desjardins	Hochelaga	Independent Conservative
1887	Cyrille Doyon	Laprairie	Independent Liberal
1887	Henri Jules Juchereau Duchesnay	Dorchester	Nationalist
1887	Joseph Godbout	Beauce	Independent Liberal
1887	John Lang	Peterborough East	Independent Liberal
1887	Peter Mitchell	Northumberland	Independent
1887	Donald Alexander Smith	Montreal West	Independent Liberal
1887	William Welsh	Queen's County	Independent Liberal
1887 (b)	John Ferguson	Renfrew South	Independent
1888 (b)	Fabien Boisvert	Nicolet	Independent Conservative
1888 (b)	Alphonse-Télesphore Lépine	Montreal East	Independent Conservative
1889 (b)	Hilaire Neveu	Joliette	Nationalist
1891	Guillaume Amyot	Bellechasse	Nationalist Conservative
1891	Thomas Dixon Craig	Durham East	Independent Conservative
1891	Alphonse Télesphore Lépine	Montreal East	Independent Conservative
1891	Dalton McCarthy	Simcoe North	Independent
1891	Joseph Octave Mousseau	Soulanges	Independent
1891	Donald Alexander Smith	Montreal West	Independent Liberal
1891	Cyrille Émile Vaillancourt	Dorchester	Nationalist
1891	William Welsh	Queen's County	Independent Liberal
1892 (b)	William Findlay Maclean	York East	Independent Conservative
1892 (b)	Hiram Augustus Calvin	Frontenac	Independent Conservative
1893 (b)	Joseph-Israël Tarte	L'Islet	Independent
1895 (b)	William Stubbs	Cardwell	McCarthyite
1896	Thomas Dixon Craig	Durham East	Independent Conservative
1896	John Ferguson	Renfrew South	Independent Conservative
1896	Duncan Graham	Ontario North	Independent Liberal
1896	John Lang	Peterborough East	Independent Liberal
1896	William James Lewis	Albert	Independent
1896	Dalton McCarthy	Brandon	Independent
1896	Dalton McCarthy	Simcoe North	Independent
1896	William Varney Pettet	Prince Edward	Patrons of Industry
1896	John Ross Robertson	Toronto East	Independent Conservative
1896	David Dickson Rogers	Frontenac	Patrons of Industry
1896	William Stubbs	Cardwell	Independent Conservative
1897 (b)	Duncan Graham	Ontario North	Independent Liberal
1898 (b)	Leighton McCarthy	Simcoe North	Independent (McCarthyite)
1900 (b)	Henri Bourassa	Labelle	Independent
1900 (b)	Arthur Puttee	Winnipeg	Labour
1900	John Lang	Peterborough East	Independent Liberal
1900	William Findlay Maclean	York East	Independent Conservative
1900	Leighton Goldie McCarthy	Simcoe North	Independent
1900	Arthur Puttee	Winnipeg	Labour
1900	Robert Lorne Richardson	Lisgar	Independent
1900	Jabel Robinson	Elgin West	Independent
1904	William Findlay Maclean	York South	Independent Conservative
1904	Leighton Goldie McCarthy	Simcoe North	Independent
1906 (b)	Alphonse Verville	Maisonneuve	Labour
1906 (b)	Lorenzo Robitaille	Quebec County	Independent Liberal
1908	William Findlay Maclean	York South	Independent Conservative
1908	Joseph Russell	Toronto East	Independent
1908	Alphonse Verville	Maisonneuve	Labour
1909 (b)	David Arthur Lafortune	Montcalm	Independent Liberal
1910 (b)	Arthur Gilbert	Drummond—Arthabaska	Nationalist
1911	Adélard Bellemare	Maskinongé	Independent Conservative
1911	Joseph Girard	Chicoutimi—Saguenay	Independent Conservative
1911	William Findlay Maclean	York South	Independent Conservative
1911	Alphonse Verville	Maisonneuve	Labour

=== 1917–1962 ===
Election	Member of Parliament	Constituency	Party/description
1919 (b)	Thomas Wakem Caldwell	Victoria—Carleton	United Farmers
1919 (b)	Oliver Robert Gould	Assiniboia	United Farmers
1919 (b)	John Wilfred Kennedy	Glengarry and Stormont	United Farmers of Ontario
1919 (b)	Robert Henry Halbert	Ontario North	Independent
1920 (b)	Angus McDonald	Timiskaming	Independent
1920 (b)	Sydney Smith McDermand	Elgin East	United Farmers of Ontario
1921	Robert Henry Halbert	Ontario North	United Farmers of Ontario
1921	William Irvine	East Calgary	Labour
1921	William Findlay Maclean	York South	Independent Conservative
1921	Angus McDonald	Timiskaming	Independent
1921	Joseph Tweed Shaw	Calgary West	Labour
1921	John Jabez Thurston	Victoria	Independent
1921	James Shaver Woodsworth	Winnipeg Centre	Labour
1925	Joseph Henri Napoléon Bourassa	Labelle	Independent Liberal
1925	Julien-Édouard-Alfred Dubuc	Chicoutimi	Independent
1925	Abraham Albert Heaps	Winnipeg North	Labour
1925	William Thomas Lucas	Camrose	United Farmers of Alberta
1925	William Findlay Maclean	York South	Independent Conservative
1925	Alan Webster Neill	Comox—Alberni	Independent
1925	Alfred Speakman	Red Deer	United Farmers of Alberta
1925	James Shaver Woodsworth	Winnipeg North Centre	Labour
1926	Herbert Bealey Adshead	Calgary East	Labour
1926	Joseph Henri Napoléon Bourassa	Labelle	Independent
1926	Beniah Bowman	Algoma East	United Farmers of Ontario
1926	George Gibson Coote	Macleod	United Farmers of Alberta
1926	Julien-Édouard-Alfred Dubuc	Chicoutimi	Independent Liberal
1926	Robert Gardiner	Acadia	United Farmers of Alberta
1926	Edward Joseph Garland	Bow River	United Farmers of Alberta
1926	Abraham Albert Heaps	Winnipeg North	Labour
1926	Lincoln Henry Jelliff	Lethbridge	United Farmers of Alberta
1926	William Irvine	Wetaskiwin	United Farmers of Alberta
1926	Donald Ferdinand Kellner	Athabaska	United Farmers of Alberta
1926	Donald MacBeth Kennedy	Peace River	United Farmers of Alberta
1926	William Thomas Lucas	Camrose	United Farmers of Alberta
1926	Michael Luchkovich	Vegreville	United Farmers of Alberta
1926	Alan Webster Neill	Comox—Alberni	Independent
1926	Alfred Speakman	Red Deer	United Farmers of Alberta
1926	Henry Elvins Spencer	Battle River	United Farmers of Alberta
1926	James Shaver Woodsworth	Winnipeg North Centre	Labour
1929 (b)	William Samuel Murphy	Lanark	Independent Conservative
1930	Joseph Henri Napoléon Bourassa	Labelle	Independent
1930	George Gibson Coote	Macleod	United Farmers of Alberta
1930	Robert Gardiner	Acadia	United Farmers of Alberta
1930	Edward Joseph Garland	Bow River	United Farmers of Alberta
1930	Abraham Albert Heaps	Winnipeg North	Labour
1930	William Irvine	Wetaskiwin	United Farmers of Alberta
1930	Donald MacBeth Kennedy	Peace River	United Farmers of Alberta
1930	William Thomas Lucas	Camrose	United Farmers of Alberta
1930	Michael Luchkovich	Vegreville	United Farmers of Alberta
1930	Angus MacInnis	Vancouver South	Independent Labour
1930	Alan Webster Neill	Comox—Alberni	Independent
1930	Alfred Speakman	Red Deer	United Farmers of Alberta
1930	Henry Elvins Spencer	Battle River	United Farmers of Alberta
1930	James Shaver Woodsworth	Winnipeg North Centre	Labour
1931 (b)	Humphrey Mitchell	Hamilton East	Labour
1935	Martha Black	Yukon	Independent Conservative
1935	François Blais	Chapleau	Independent Liberal
1935	Agnes Macphail	Grey—Bruce	United Farmers of Ontario-Labour
1935	Alan Webster Neill	Comox—Alberni	Independent
1935	Henry Herbert Stevens	Kootenay East	Reconstruction
1938 (b)	Georges Héon	Argenteuil	Independent Conservative
1939 (b)	Walter George Brown	Saskatoon City	United Reform
1940	Lionel Bertrand	Terrebonne	Independent Liberal
1940	Walter George Brown	Saskatoon City	United Reform
1940	Walter Frederick Kuhl	Jasper—Edson	New Democracy
1940	Liguori Lacombe	Laval—Two Mountains	Independent Liberal
1940	Alan Webster Neill	Comox—Alberni	Independent
1940	Dorise Nielsen	North Battleford	Unity
1940	Joseph Sasseville Roy	Gaspé	Independent Conservative
1942 (b)	Frédéric Dorion	Charlevoix—Saguenay	Independent
1943 (b)	Joseph-Armand Choquette	Stanstead	Bloc populaire canadien
1943 (b)	Fred Rose	Cartier	Labor-Progressive
1945	Bona Arsenault	Bonaventure	Independent
1945	Maurice Bourget	Lévis	Independent Liberal
1945	Arthur Cardin	Richelieu—Verchères	Independent
1945	Philéas Côté	Matapédia—Matane	Independent Liberal
1945	Joseph-Alfred Dion	Lake St-John—Roberval	Independent Liberal
1945	Frédéric Dorion	Charlevoix—Saguenay	Independent
1945	Lucien Dubois	Nicolet—Yamaska	Independent Liberal
1945	Paul-Edmond Gagnon	Chicoutimi	Independent
1945	Wilfrid Gariépy	Trois-Rivières	Independent
1945	John Lambert Gibson	Comox—Alberni	Independent
1945	René Hamel	St-Maurice—Laflèche	Bloc populaire canadien
1945	Georges Héon	Argenteuil	Independent Progressive Conservative
1945	Herbert Wilfred Herridge	Kootenay West	Independent CCF
1945	Liguori Lacombe	Laval—Two Mountains	Independent
1945	Wilfrid Lacroix	Québec—Montmorency	Independent Liberal
1945	Charles Parent	Quebec West and South	Independent Liberal
1945	Jean-François Pouliot	Témiscouata	Independent Liberal
1945	Maxime Raymond	Beauharnois—Laprairie	Bloc populaire canadien
1945	Fred Rose	Cartier	Labor-Progressive
1949	Raymond Bruneau	Prescott	Independent Liberal
1949	Paul-Edmond Gagnon	Chicoutimi	Independent
1949	John Lambert Gibson	Comox—Alberni	Independent
1949	Camillien Houde	Papineau	Independent
1949	Raoul Poulin	Raoul Poulin	Independent
1949	Jean-François Pouliot	Témiscouata	Independent Liberal
1949 (b)	Edgar Leduc	Jacques Cartier	Independent
1949 (b)	Paul-Léon Dubé	Restigouche—Madawaska	Independent Liberal
1949 (b)	Arthur Massé	Kamouraska	Independent Liberal
1950 (b)	Joseph-Hervé Rousseau	Rimouski	Independent Liberal
1953	Paul-Edmond Gagnon	Chicoutimi	Independent
1953	Fernand Girard	Lapointe	Independent
1953	Arthur Massé	Kamouraska	Independent Liberal
1953	Adrien Meunier	Papineau	Independent Liberal
1953	Raoul Poulin	Beauce	Independent
1957	Samuel Boulanger	Drummond—Arthabaska	Independent Liberal
1957	Benoît Chabot	Kamouraska	Independent
1957	Henri Courtemanche	Labelle	Independent Progressive Conservative
1957	Gérard Loiselle	St. Ann	Independent Liberal
1957	Raoul Poulin	Beauce	Independent

=== 1963–1992 ===
Election	Member of Parliament	Constituency	Party/description
1965	Maurice Allard	Sherbrooke	Independent Progressive Conservative
1965	Joseph-Alfred Mongrain	Trois-Rivières	Independent
1968	Lucien Lamoureux	Stormont—Dundas	No affiliation (speaker)
1972	Lucien Lamoureux	Stormont—Dundas	No affiliation (speaker)
1972	Roch LaSalle	Joliette	Independent
1974	Leonard C. Jones	Moncton	Independent
1984	Tony Roman	York North	Independent
1990 (b)	Gilles Duceppe	Laurier—Sainte-Marie	Independent

=== 1993–present ===
Election	Member of Parliament	Constituency	Party/description
1993	Gilles Bernier	Beauce	Independent
1997	John Nunziata	York South—Weston	Independent
2004	Chuck Cadman	Surrey North	Independent
2006	André Arthur	Portneuf—Jacques-Cartier	Independent
2008	André Arthur	Portneuf—Jacques-Cartier	Independent
2008	Bill Casey	Cumberland—Colchester—Musquodoboit Valley	Independent
2011	Elizabeth May	Saanich—Gulf Islands	Green
2015	Elizabeth May	Saanich—Gulf Islands	Green
2019 (b)	Paul Manly	Nanaimo—Ladysmith	Green
2019	Jenica Atwin	Fredericton	Green
2019	Paul Manly	Nanaimo—Ladysmith	Green
2019	Elizabeth May	Saanich—Gulf Islands	Green
2019	Jody Wilson-Raybould	Vancouver Granville	Independent
2021	Elizabeth May	Saanich—Gulf Islands	Green
2021	Mike Morrice	Kitchener Centre	Green

== See also ==
- List of UK minor party and independent MPs elected
- Lists of members of the Canadian House of Commons
