= By-elections to the 6th Canadian Parliament =

By-elections to the 6th Canadian Parliament were held to elect members of the House of Commons of Canada between the 1887 federal election and the 1891 federal election. The Conservative Party of Canada led a majority government for the 6th Canadian Parliament.

The list includes Ministerial by-elections which occurred due to the requirement that Members of Parliament recontest their seats upon being appointed to Cabinet. These by-elections were almost always uncontested. This requirement was abolished in 1931.

By-election	Date	Incumbent	Party	Winner	Party	Cause	Retained
Victoria South	December 18, 1890	Adam Hudspeth	Conservative	Charles Fairbairn	Liberal-Conservative	Death	Yes
Napierville	December 9, 1890	Louis Sainte-Marie	Liberal	François-Xavier Paradis	Conservative	Resigned to enter provincial politics in Quebec.	No
Kent	July 31, 1890	Pierre-Amand Landry	Conservative	Édouard H. Léger	Conservative	Appointed a judge in the county court of Westmorland and Kent.	Yes
Montmorency	July 25, 1890	Charles Langelier	Liberal	Louis-Georges Desjardins	Conservative	Resignation to enter provincial politics in Quebec.	No
New Westminster	June 19, 1890	Donald Chisholm	Conservative	Gordon Edward Corbould	Conservative	Death	Yes
Lincoln and Niagara	May 23, 1890	John Charles Rykert	Conservative	John Charles Rykert	Conservative	Resignation to recontest over charges of corruption.	Yes
Ottawa (City of) (electoral district)	April 26, 1890	William Goodhue Perley	Conservative	Charles Herbert Mackintosh	Conservative	Death	Yes
Haldimand	February 20, 1890	Charles Wesley Colter	Liberal	Walter Humphries Montague	Conservative	Election declared void.	No
Stanstead	December 18, 1889	Charles Carroll Colby	Liberal-Conservative	Charles Carroll Colby	Liberal-Conservative	Recontested upon appointment as President of the Privy Council.	Yes
Victoria	October 28, 1889	Edgar Crow Baker	Conservative	Thomas Earle	Conservative	Resignation.	Yes
Compton	May 16, 1889	John Henry Pope	Liberal-Conservative	Rufus Henry Pope	Conservative	Death	Yes
Haldimand	January 30, 1889	Walter Humphries Montague	Conservative	Charles Wesley Colter	Liberal	Election declared void.	No
Provencher	January 24, 1889	Joseph Royal	Conservative	Alphonse Alfred Clément Larivière	Conservative	Appointed Lieutenant-Governor of the North West Territories.	Yes
Joliette	January 16, 1889	Édouard Guilbault	Conservative	Hilaire Neveu	Nationalist	Election declared void.	No
Cumberland	December 26, 1888	Arthur Rupert Dickey	Conservative	Arthur Rupert Dickey	Conservative	Election declared void.	Yes
Cariboo	November 22, 1888	James Reid	Liberal-Conservative	Francis Stillman Barnard	Conservative	Called to the Senate.	Yes
Northumberland East	November 21, 1888	Edward Cochrane	Conservative	Edward Cochrane	Conservative	Election declared void.	Yes
Shelburne	October 22, 1888	John Wimburne Laurie	Conservative	John Wimburne Laurie	Conservative	Election declared void.	Yes
Cardwell	October 3, 1888	Thomas White	Conservative	Robert Smeaton White	Conservative	Death	Yes
Montreal East	September 26, 1888	Charles-Joseph Coursol	Conservative	Alphonse-Télesphore Lépine	Independent Conservative	Death	No
Assiniboia East	September 12, 1888	William Dell Perley	Conservative	Edgar Dewdney	Conservative	Called to the Senate	Yes
Halton	August 22, 1888	John Waldie	Conservative	David Henderson	Conservative	Election declared void.	No
Lanark South	August 15, 1888	John Graham Haggart	Liberal	John Graham Haggart	Conservative	Recontested upon appointment as Postmaster-General.	Yes
Colchester	August 15, 1888	Archibald McLelan	Conservative	Adams George Archibald	Liberal-Conservative	Appointed Lieutenant-Governor of Nova Scotia.	Yes
Nicolet	July 17, 1888	Athanase Gaudet	Nationalist Conservative	Fabien Boisvert	Independent Conservative	Death	No
Cumberland	July 13, 1888	Charles Tupper	Conservative	Arthur Rupert Dickey	Conservative	Appointed Canadian High Commissioner to the United Kingdom.	Yes
Pictou	June 18, 1888	Charles Hibbert Tupper	Conservative	Charles Hibbert Tupper	Conservative	Recontested upon appointment as Minister of Marine and Fisheries.	Yes
Russell	May 7, 1888	William C. Edwards	Liberal	William C. Edwards	Liberal	Election declared void.	Yes
Kent	May 2, 1888	Archibald Campbell	Liberal	Archibald Campbell	Liberal	Election declared void.	Yes
L'Assomption	April 3, 1888	Joseph Gauthier	Liberal	Joseph Gauthier	Liberal	Election declared void.	Yes
Missisquoi	March 27, 1888	George Clayes	Liberal	Daniel Bishop Meigs	Liberal	Death	Yes
Prince Edward	March 19, 1888	John Milton Platt	Liberal	John Milton Platt	Liberal	Election declared void.	Yes
Hastings West	March 17, 1888	Alexander Robertson	Conservative	Henry Corby, Jr.	Conservative	Death	Yes
Middlesex West	March 10, 1888	William Frederick Roome	Conservative	William Frederick Roome	Conservative	Election declared void.	Yes
Halton	February 7, 1888	John Waldie	Liberal	David Henderson	Conservative	Election declared void.	No
Carleton	February 1, 1888	John A. Macdonald	Liberal-Conservative	George Lemuel Dickinson	Conservative	Chose to sit for Kingston.	Yes
Victoria	January 23, 1888	Noah Shakespeare	Conservative	Edward Gawler Prior	Conservative	Appointed Postmaster of Victoria.	Yes
Queen's	January 18, 1888	George Gerald King	Liberal	George Frederick Baird	Conservative	Election declared void.	No
Dorchester	January 7, 1888	Henri Jules Juchereau Duchesnay	Nationalist Conservative	Honoré-Julien-Jean-Baptiste Chouinard	Conservative	Death	No
Northumberland East	December 22, 1887	Albert Mallory	Liberal	Edward Cochrane	Conservative	Election declared void.	No
Shelburne	December 15, 1887	Thomas Robertson	Liberal	John Wimburne Laurie	Conservative	Election declared void.	No
Yarmouth	December 15, 1887	John Lovitt	Liberal	John Lovitt	Liberal	Election declared void.	Yes
Victoria	November 21, 1887	Charles James Campbell	Conservative	John Archibald McDonald	Liberal	Election declared void.	No
Haldimand	November 12, 1887	Walter Humphries Montague	Conservative	Walter Humphries Montague	Conservative	Election declared void.	Yes
Cumberland	November 9, 1887	Charles Tupper	Conservative	Charles Tupper	Conservative	Election declared void.	Yes
Colchester	October 27, 1887	Archibald McLelan	Conservative	Archibald McLelan	Conservative	Election declared void.	Yes
Bruce West	October 19, 1887	Edward Blake	Liberal	James Rowand	Liberal	Chose to sit for Durham West.	Yes
Richelieu	October 18, 1887	Jean-Baptiste Labelle	Conservative	Joseph-Aimé Massue	Conservative	Death	Yes
Charlevoix	September 28, 1887	Simon-Xavier Cimon	Conservative	Simon Cimon	Conservative	Death	Yes
Renfrew South	August 2, 1887	Robert Campbell	Liberal	John Ferguson	Independent	Death	No
Digby	July 16, 1887	John Campbell	Conservative	Herbert Ladd Jones	Conservative	Death	Yes
Restigouche	May 21, 1887	Robert Moffat	Conservative	George Moffat Jr.	Conservative	Death	Yes
Victoria South	April 20, 1887	Adam Hudspeth	Conservative	Adam Hudspeth	Liberal-Conservative	Seeks re-election due to holding the office of revising officer.	Yes
Bruce East	April 2, 1887	Henry Cargill	Conservative	Henry Cargill	Conservative	Seeks re-election due to holding the position of postmaster.	Yes

== See also ==
- List of federal by-elections in Canada

== Sources ==
- Parliament of Canada–Elected in By-Elections
