= By-elections to the 1st Canadian Parliament =

Elections to fill vacancies during term of 1st Parliament

1st Canadian Parliament
- Majority parliament
- Sep. 24, 1867 – Jul. 8, 1872

By-elections to the 1st Canadian Parliament were held to elect members of the House of Commons of Canada between the 1867 federal election and the 1872 federal election. The Conservative Party of Canada held a majority government throughout the term of the 1st Canadian Parliament. From 1867 to 1871, there were thirty-seven by-elections: seventeen in Quebec, nine in Ontario, seven in Nova Scotia, and four in New Brunswick, plus by-elections held in Manitoba and British Columbia to fill new seats in those provinces.

The list includes Ministerial by-elections which occurred due to the requirement, at the time, that Members of Parliament recontest their seats upon being appointed to Cabinet. These by-elections were almost always uncontested. This requirement was abolished in 1931.

By-elections were held for the new provinces of Manitoba and British Columbia, which joined Confederation in 1870 and 1871. These were new elections, to fill the positions created by the terms of union for each of the new provinces. Six members were elected in British Columbia, in five ridings (Victoria had two seats). Although there were four seats in Manitoba, only three members were elected, because a tie was declared in one riding. The outcome of the disputed election was not resolved prior to the 1872 election, so neither candidate was allowed to take the seat in the House of Commons.

== New Brunswick ==
Date	Riding	Incumbent	Party	Elected	Party	Reason for by-election
March 13, 1868	Restigouche	John McMillan	Liberal	William Murray Caldwell	Liberal	McMillan appointed Inspector of Post Offices in New Brunswick, February 15, 1868
October 28, 1868	York	Charles Fisher	Liberal	John Pickard	Independent Liberal	Fisher appointed to New Brunswick Supreme Court, October 3, 1868
December 24, 1868	Northumberland	John Mercer Johnson	Liberal	Richard Hutchison	Liberal	Johnson's death, November 8, 1868
November 29, 1870	Restigouche	William Murray Caldwell	Liberal	George Moffat, Sr.	Conservative	Caldwell appointed inspector of post offices in New Brunswick, September 29, 1870

=== Nova Scotia ===
Date	Riding	Incumbent	Party	Elected	Party	Reason for by-election
April 20, 1869	Richmond	William Joseph Croke	Anti-Confederate	Isaac LeVesconte	Conservative	Croke's death, March 11, 1869
April 20, 1869	Yarmouth	Thomas Killam	Anti-Confederate	Frank Killam	Liberal	Thomas Killam's death, December 15, 1868
April 24, 1869	Hants	Joseph Howe	Anti-Confederate	Joseph Howe	Liberal-Conservative	Ministerial by-election upon Howe's appointment as President of the Privy Council, January 30, 1869
September 9, 1869	Colchester	Archibald McLelan	Anti-Confederate	Adams George Archibald	Liberal-Conservative	McLelan called to the Senate, June 21, 1869
June 15, 1870	Cumberland	Charles Tupper	Conservative	Charles Tupper	Conservative	Ministerial by-election upon Tupper's appointment as President of the Privy Council
June 23, 1870	Kings	William Henry Chipman	Anti-Confederate	Leverett de Veber Chipman	Liberal	William Chipman's death, April 10, 1870
November 8, 1870	Colchester	Adams George Archibald	Liberal-Conservative	Frederick M. Pearson	Liberal	Archibald appointed Lieutenant-Governor of Manitoba and Lieutenant Governor of the North-West Territories, May 20, 1870

== Ontario ==
Date	Riding	Incumbent	Party	Elected	Party	Reason for by-election
April 13, 1868	Lincoln	James Rea Benson	Liberal-Conservative	Thomas Rodman Merritt	Liberal	Benson called to the Senate, March 14, 1868
August 14, 1868	York West	William Pearce Howland	Liberal-Conservative	Amos Wright	Liberal	Howland appointed Lieutenant-Governor of Ontario, July 15, 1868
July 12, 1869	Wellington Centre	Thomas Sutherland Parker	Liberal	James Ross	Liberal	Parker's death, October 24, 1868
November 13, 1869	Renfrew North	John Rankin	Liberal-Conservative	Francis Hincks	Conservative	Rankin resigned to provide a seat for Hincks, October 12, 1869
November 29, 1869	Renfrew South	Daniel McLachlin	Liberal	John Lorn McDougall	Liberal	McLachlin resigned June 3, 1869, taking retirement
November 29, 1869	Lanark South	Alexander Morris	Conservative	Alexander Morris	Conservative	Ministerial by-election upon Morris's appointment as Minister of Inland Revenue, November 15, 1869
April 27, 1870	Frontenac	Thomas Kirkpatrick	Conservative	George Airey Kirkpatrick	Conservative	Kirkpatrick's death, March 26, 1870
March 20, 1871	Hastings East	Robert Read	Conservative	John White	Conservative	Read called to the Senate, February 24, 1871
June 30, 1871	Algoma	Wemyss Mackenzie Simpson	Conservative	Frederick William Cumberland	Conservative	Simpson appointed Indian Commissioner for Rupert's Land, April 26, 1871

== Quebec ==
Date	Riding	Incumbent	Party	Elected	Party	Reason for by-election
November 28, 1867	Huntingdon	Sir John Rose	Liberal-Conservative	Sir John Rose	Liberal-Conservative	Ministerial by-election upon Rose's appointment as Minister of Finance, November 18, 1867
December 11, 1867	Montmorency	Joseph-Édouard Cauchon	Conservative	Jean Langlois	Conservative	Cauchon called to the Senate, November 2, 1867
April 20, 1868	Montreal West	Thomas D'Arcy McGee	Liberal-Conservative	Michael Patrick Ryan	Liberal-Conservative	McGee assassinated, April 7, 1868
October 17, 1868	Three Rivers	Louis-Charles Boucher de Niverville	Conservative	William McDougall	Conservative	Boucher de Niverville appointed sheriff for the district of Trois-Rivières, September 30, 1868
October 30, 1868	Saint Maurice	Louis-Léon Lesieur Desaulniers	Conservative	Élie Lacerte	Conservative	Desaulniers appointed inspector of prisons and asylums in Quebec, September 29, 1868
February 17, 1869	Kamouraska	Vacant		Charles Alphonse Pantaléon Pelletier	Liberal	No election held in 1867 due to riots
July 14, 1869	L'Islet	Barthélemy Pouliot	Conservative	Barthélemy Pouliot	Conservative	Previous election annulled, June 9, 1869
October 30, 1869	Huntingdon	Sir John Rose	Liberal-Conservative	Julius Scriver	Liberal	Rose resigned September 29, 1869 and moved to London where he acted as the government's representative to the UK.
November 29, 1869	Brome	Christopher Dunkin	Conservative	Christopher Dunkin	Conservative	Ministerial by-election upon Dunkin's appointment as Minister of Agriculture, November 15, 1869
July 5, 1870	Missisquoi	Brown Chamberlin	Conservative	George Barnard Baker	Liberal-Conservative	Chamberlin resigned on appointment as Queen's Printer, June 6, 1870
July 18, 1870	Quebec East	Pierre-Gabriel Huot	Liberal	Adolphe Guillet dit Tourangeau	Conservative	Huot resigned on appointment as postmaster at Quebec, June 14, 1870
August 15, 1870	Bellechasse	Louis-Napoléon Casault	Conservative	Télesphore Fournier	Liberal	Casault resigned on appointment to the Superior Court of Quebec, May 26, 1870
September 1, 1870	St. Hyacinthe	Alexandre-Édouard Kierzkowski	Liberal	Louis Delorme	Liberal	Kierzkowski's death, August 4, 1870
November 18, 1870	Richelieu	Thomas McCarthy	Conservative	Georges Isidore Barthe	Independent Conservative	McCarthy's death, September 23, 1870
September 15, 1871	Montcalm	Joseph Dufresne	Conservative	Firmin Dugas	Conservative	Dufresne was appointed Sheriff of Saint-Jean County, July 13, 1871
November 11, 1871	Compton	John Henry Pope	Conservative	John Henry Pope	Conservative	Ministerial by-election upon appointment as Minister of Agriculture, October 25, 1871
November 17, 1871	Brome	Christopher Dunkin	Conservative	Edward Carter	Conservative	Dunkin resigned on appointment to the Superior Court of Quebec, October 24, 1871

== New elections ==
=== Manitoba 1870 ===
Date	District	Elected	Party
March 2, 1871	Lisgar	John Christian Schultz	Independent Liberal
March 2, 1871	Marquette	James S. Lynch and Angus McKay	Lynch (Liberal) and McKay (Conservative) were both declared elected due to a tie vote. Neither one took the seat in the Commons. The issue was not determined prior to the 1872 federal election.
March 2, 1871	Selkirk	Donald Alexander Smith	Independent Conservative
March 3, 1871	Provencher	Pierre Delorme	Conservative

== British Columbia 1871 ==
Date	District	Elected	Party
November 24, 1871	Victoria (two members)	Henry Nathan, Jr.	Liberal
November 24, 1871	Victoria (two members)	Amor De Cosmos	Liberal
December 13, 1871	New Westminster	Hugh Nelson	Liberal-Conservative
December 15, 1871	Vancouver Island	Robert Wallace	Conservative
December 19, 1871	Cariboo	Joshua Spencer Thompson	Liberal-Conservative
December 19, 1871	Yale District	Charles Frederick Houghton	Liberal

== See also ==
- List of federal by-elections in Canada

== Sources ==
- Parliament of Canada–Elected in By-Elections
