= By-elections to the 7th Canadian Parliament =

By-elections to the 7th Canadian Parliament were held to elect members of the House of Commons of Canada between the 1891 federal election and the 1896 federal election. The Conservative Party of Canada led a majority government for the 7th Canadian Parliament.

The list includes Ministerial by-elections which occurred due to the requirement that Members of Parliament recontest their seats upon being appointed to Cabinet. These by-elections were almost always uncontested. This requirement was abolished in 1931.

By-election	Date	Incumbent	Party	Winner	Party	Cause	Retained
Northumberland	February 6, 1896	Michael Adams	Conservative	James Robinson	Conservative	Called to the Senate.	Yes
Cape Breton	February 4, 1896	David MacKeen	Conservative	Charles Tupper	Conservative	Resignation to provide a seat for Tupper.	Yes
Charlevoix	January 27, 1896	Henry Simard	Liberal	Louis Charles Alphonse Angers	Liberal	Death	Yes
Huron West	January 14, 1896	James Colebrooke Patterson	Conservative	Malcolm Colin Cameron	Liberal	Appointed Lieutenant-Governor of Manitoba.	No
Victoria	January 6, 1896	Edward Gawler Prior	Conservative	Edward Gawler Prior	Conservative	Recontested upon appointment as Minister of Inland Revenue.	Yes
Montreal Centre	December 27, 1895	John Joseph Curran	Conservative	James McShane	Liberal	Appointed a judge of the Superior Court of Quebec.	No
Cardwell	December 24, 1895	Robert Smeaton White	Conservative	William Stubbs	McCarthyite	Resignation.	No
Ontario North	December 12, 1895	Frank Madill	Conservative	John Alexander McGillivray	Conservative	Death.	Yes
Jacques Cartier	November 30, 1895	Désiré Girouard	Conservative	Napoléon Charbonneau	Liberal	Appointed a judge of the Supreme Court of Canada.	No
Westmorland	August 24, 1895	Josiah Wood	Conservative	Henry A. Powell	Liberal-Conservative	Called to the Senate.	Yes
Verchères	April 17, 1895	Félix Geoffrion	Liberal	Christophe-Alphonse Geoffrion	Liberal	Death.	Yes
Quebec West	April 17, 1895	John Hearn	Conservative	Thomas McGreevy	Liberal-Conservative	Death.	Yes
Antigonish	April 17, 1895	John Sparrow David Thompson	Liberal-Conservative	Colin Francis McIsaac	Liberal	Death	No
Haldimand	April 17, 1895	Walter Humphries Montague	Conservative	Walter Humphries Montague	Conservative	Recontested upon appointment as Secretary of State for Canada.	Yes
Cumberland	January 15, 1895	Arthur Rupert Dickey	Conservative	Arthur Rupert Dickey	Conservative	Recontested upon appointment as Secretary of State for Canada.	Yes
Hastings West	July 4, 1894	Henry Corby, Jr.	Conservative	Henry Corby, Jr.	Conservative	resignation to recontest due to selling methylated spirits to the government.	Yes
Gloucester	May 5, 1894	Kennedy Francis Burns	Conservative	Théotime Blanchard	Conservative	Called to the Senate.	Yes
Ottawa (City of)	December 7, 1893	Charles H. Mackintosh	Conservative	Honoré Robillard	Liberal-Conservative	Appointed Lieutenant Governor of the North-West Territories.	Yes
Winnipeg	November 22, 1893	Hugh John Macdonald	Liberal-Conservative	Joseph Martin	Liberal	Resignation	No
Vancouver	May 2, 1893	David William Gordon	Liberal-Conservative	Andrew Haslam	Liberal-Conservative	Death	Yes
Vaudreuil	April 12, 1893	Hugh McMillan	Conservative	Henry Stanislas Harwood	Liberal	Election declared void.	No
Middlesex South	March 22, 1893	James Armstrong	Liberal	Robert Boston	Liberal	Death	Yes
Terrebonne	January 10, 1893	Joseph-Adolphe Chapleau	Conservative	Pierre-Julien Leclair	Conservative	Appointed Lieutenant-Governor of Quebec.	Yes
L'Islet	January 5, 1893	Louis-Georges Desjardins	Conservative	Joseph-Israël Tarte	Independent	Appointed Clerk of the Legislative Assembly of Quebec.	No
Town of Sherbrooke	December 21, 1892	William Bullock Ives	Conservative	William Bullock Ives	Conservative	Recontested upon appointment as President of the Privy Council.	Yes
York West	December 21, 1892	Nathaniel Clarke Wallace	Conservative	Nathaniel Clarke Wallace	Conservative	Recontested upon appointment as Controller of Customs.	Yes
Brockville	December 21, 1892	John Fisher Wood	Liberal-Conservative	John Fisher Wood	Liberal-Conservative	Recontested upon appointment as Controller of Inland Revenue.	Yes
Hastings North	December 20, 1892	Mackenzie Bowell	Conservative	Alexander Augustus Williamson Carscallen	Conservative	Called to the Senate.	Yes
Montreal Centre	December 18, 1892	John Joseph Curran	Conservative	John Joseph Curran	Conservative	Recontested upon appointment as Solicitor General.	Yes
Soulanges	December 13, 1892	James William Bain	Conservative	James William Bain	Conservative	Election declared void.	Yes
Kent	December 6, 1892	Édouard H. Léger	Conservative	George McInerney	Conservative	Death	Yes
City and County of St. John	November 22, 1892	Charles Nelson Skinner	Liberal	John Alexander Chesley	Conservative	Appointed a judge.	No
Assiniboia East	November 21, 1892	Edgar Dewdney	Conservative	William Walter McDonald	Conservative	Appointed Lieutenant-Governor of British Columbia.	Yes
Selkirk	November 2, 1892	Thomas Mayne Daly	Liberal-Conservative	Thomas Mayne Daly	Liberal-Conservative	Recontested upon appointment as Minister of the Interior and Superintendent General of Indian Affairs.	Yes
Hochelaga	October 21, 1892	Alphonse Desjardins	Conservative	Séverin Lachapelle	Conservative	Called to the Senate.	Yes
Chicoutimi—Saguenay	August 16, 1892	Paul Vilmond Savard	Liberal	Louis-de-Gonzague Belley	Conservative	Election declared void.	No
Marquette	July 15, 1892	Robert Watson	Liberal	Nathaniel Boyd	Conservative	Resignation to enter provincial politics in Manitoba.	No
Pontiac	June 26, 1892	Thomas Murray	Liberal	John Bryson	Conservative	Election declared void.	No
Frontenac	June 10, 1892	George Airey Kirkpatrick	Conservative	Hiram Augustus Calvin	Independent Conservative	Appointed Lieutenant Governor of Ontario.	No
L'Assomption	May 31, 1892	Joseph Gauthier	Liberal	Hormidas Jeannotte	Conservative	Election declared void.	No
Perth North	May 19, 1892	James Nicol Grieve	Liberal	James Nicol Grieve	Liberal	Election declared void.	Yes
York East	May 11, 1892	Alexander Mackenzie	Liberal	William Findlay Maclean	Independent Conservative	Death	No
Welland	April 29, 1892	William Manley German	Liberal	James A. Lowell	Liberal	Election declared void.	Yes
Carleton	April 6, 1892	Newton Ramsay Colter	Liberal	Newton Ramsay Colter	Liberal	Election declared void.	Yes
Prescott	March 30, 1892	Isidore Proulx	Liberal	Isidore Proulx	Liberal	Election declared void.	Yes
Northumberland West	March 15, 1892	John Hargraft	Liberal	George Guillet	Conservative	Election declared void.	No
Monck	March 12, 1892	John Brown	Liberal	Arthur Boyle	Conservative	Election declared void.	No
Brome	March 10, 1892	Eugène Alphonse Dyer	Conservative	Eugène Alphonse Dyer	Conservative	Election declared void.	Yes
Perth South	March 10, 1892	James Trow	Liberal	William Pridham	Conservative	Election declared void.	No
Montmorency	March 10, 1892	Joseph Israël Tarte	Conservative	Arthur-Joseph Turcotte	Conservative	Election declared void.	Yes
Montcalm	March 5, 1892	Joseph Louis Euclide Dugas	Conservative	Joseph Louis Euclide Dugas	Conservative	Election declared void.	Yes
Vaudreuil	February 29, 1892	Henry Stanislas Harwood	Liberal	Hugh McMillan	Conservative	Election declared void.	No
Two Mountains	February 27, 1892	Jean-Baptiste Daoust	Conservative	Joseph Girouard	Conservative	Death	Yes
Quebec West	February 26, 1892	Thomas McGreevy	Liberal-Conservative	John Hearn	Conservative	Expelled from the House of Commons for corruption.	Yes
London	February 26, 1892	C.S. Hyman	Liberal	John Carling	Liberal-Conservative	Election declared void.	No
Queen's	February 25, 1892	George Gerald King	Liberal	George Frederick Baird	Conservative	King being declared not duly elected, 25 February 1892, George Frederick Baird was declared elected by a court decision.	No
Simcoe East	February 25, 1892	Philip Howard Spohn	Liberal	William Humphrey Bennett	Conservative	Election declared void.	No
Huron West	February 22, 1892	Malcolm Colin Cameron	Liberal	James Colebrooke Patterson	Conservative	Election declared void.	No
Ontario South	February 20, 1892	James Ironside Davidson	Liberal	William Smith	Conservative	Election declared void.	No
Hastings East	February 20, 1892	Samuel Barton Burdett	Liberal	William Barton Northrup	Conservative	Death	No
King's	February 13, 1892	Frederick William Borden	Liberal	Frederick William Borden	Liberal	Election declared void.	Yes
Digby	February 13, 1892	Edward Charles Bowers	Liberal	Edward Charles Bowers	Liberal	Election declared void.	Yes
Elgin East	February 12, 1892	Andrew B. Ingram	Liberal-Conservative	Andrew B. Ingram	Liberal-Conservative	Election declared void.	Yes
Bruce East	February 11, 1892	Reuben Eldridge Truax	Liberal	Henry Cargill	Conservative	Election declared void.	No
Victoria South	February 11, 1892	Charles Fairbairn	Liberal-Conservative	Charles Fairbairn	Liberal-Conservative	Election declared void.	Yes
Peel	February 11, 1892	Joseph Featherston	Liberal	Joseph Featherston	Liberal	Election declared void.	Yes
Victoria North	February 11, 1892	John Augustus Barron	Liberal	Sam Hughes	Liberal-Conservative	Election declared void.	No
Halifax	February 11, 1892	Thomas Edward Kenny and John Fitzwilliam Stairs	Conservative	Thomas Edward Kenny and John Fitzwilliam Stairs	Conservative	Election declared void. (Double member constituency)	Yes
Middlesex East	February 11, 1892	Joseph Henry Marshall	Conservative	Joseph Henry Marshall	Conservative	Election declared void.	Yes
Queens	February 9, 1892	Francis Gordon Forbes	Liberal	Francis Gordon Forbes	Liberal	Election declared void.	Yes
Prince Edward	February 4, 1892	Archibald Campbell Miller	Conservative	Archibald Campbell Miller	Conservative	Election declared void.	Yes
Lennox	February 4, 1892	David Wright Allison	Liberal	Uriah Wilson	Conservative	Election declared void.	No
Soulanges	February 3, 1892	Joseph Octave Mousseau	Independent	James William Bain	Conservative	Election declared void.	No
Cumberland	January 30, 1892	Arthur Rupert Dickey	Conservative	Arthur Rupert Dickey	Conservative	Election declared void.	Yes
Lincoln and Niagara	January 28, 1892	William Gibson	Liberal	William Gibson	Liberal	Election declared void.	Yes
Halton	January 28, 1892	David Henderson	Conservative	David Henderson	Conservative	Election declared void.	Yes
Kingston	January 28, 1892	John A. Macdonald	Conservative	James Henry Metcalfe	Conservative	Death	Yes
Victoria	January 26, 1892	John Archibald McDonald	Conservative	John Archibald McDonald	Conservative	Election declared void.	Yes
Laval	January 25, 1892	Joseph-Aldric Ouimet	Liberal-Conservative	Joseph-Aldric Ouimet	Liberal-Conservative	Recontested upon appointment as Minister of Public Works.	Yes
Richmond	January 21, 1892	Joseph Alexander Gillies	Conservative	Joseph Alexander Gillies	Conservative	Election declared void.	Yes
Glengarry	January 14, 1892	Roderick R. McLennan	Conservative	Roderick R. McLennan	Conservative	Election declared void.	Yes
Richelieu	January 11, 1892	Hector-Louis Langevin	Conservative	Arthur-Aimé Bruneau	Liberal	Chose to sit for Trois-Rivières.	No
Lanark North	December 31, 1891	Joseph Jamieson	Conservative	Bennett Rosamond	Conservative	Appointed a county court judge.	Yes

== See also ==
- List of federal by-elections in Canada

== Sources ==
- Parliament of Canada–Elected in By-Elections
