= By-elections to the 5th Canadian Parliament =

By-elections to the 5th Canadian Parliament were held to elect members of the House of Commons of Canada between the 1882 federal election and the 1887 federal election. The Conservative Party of Canada led a majority government for the 5th Canadian Parliament.

The list includes Ministerial by-elections which occurred due to the requirement that Members of Parliament recontest their seats upon being appointed to Cabinet. These by-elections were almost always uncontested. This requirement was abolished in 1931.

By-election	Date	Incumbent	Party	Winner	Party	Cause	Retained
Haldimand	September 8, 1886	David Thompson	Liberal	Charles Wesley Colter	Liberal	Death	Yes
Chambly	July 30, 1886	Pierre Basile Benoit	Conservative	Raymond Préfontaine	Liberal	Appointed Superintendent of the Chambly Canal.	No
King's	December 31, 1885	George Eulas Foster	Conservative	George Eulas Foster	Conservative	Recontested upon appointment as Minister of Marine and Fisheries.	Yes
City of St. John	November 24, 1885	Samuel Leonard Tilley	Liberal-Conservative	Frederick Eustace Barker	Conservative	Appointed Lieutenant-Governor of New Brunswick.	Yes
City and County of St. John	October 20, 1885	Isaac Burpee	Liberal	Charles Arthur Everett	Conservative	Death	No
Antigonish	October 16, 1885	Angus McIsaac	Liberal	John Sparrow David Thompson	Liberal-Conservative	Appointed County Court Judge for District No. 6.	No
Cardwell	August 27, 1885	Thomas White	Conservative	Thomas White	Conservative	Recontested upon appointment as Minister of the Interior.	Yes
Durham East	August 24, 1885	Arthur Trefusis Heneage Williams	Conservative	Henry Alfred Ward	Conservative	Death	Yes
Grenville South	July 4, 1885	William Thomas Benson	Conservative	Walter Shanly	Conservative	Death	Yes
Lévis	April 14, 1885	Isidore-Noël Belleau	Conservative	Pierre Malcom Guay	Liberal	Unseated on a judgement of the Supreme Court.	Yes
Northumberland West	April 7, 1885	George Guillet	Conservative	George Guillet	Conservative	Election declared void	Yes
Soulanges	February 5, 1885	James William Bain	Conservative	James William Bain	Conservative	Election declared void.	Yes
Lennox	January 28, 1885	David Wright Allison	Liberal	Matthew William Pruyn	Conservative	Election declared void.	No
Maskinongé	December 22, 1884	Frédéric Houde	Nationalist Conservative	Alexis Lesieur Desaulniers	Conservative	Death.	No
Beauce	October 31, 1884	Joseph Bolduc	Nationalist Conservative	Thomas Linière Taschereau	Conservative	Called to the Senate.	Yes
Ontario West	August 22, 1884	George Wheler	Liberal	James David Edgar	Liberal	Resignation	Yes
Queen's County	August 19, 1884	Frederick de Sainte-Croix Brecken	Conservative	John Theophilus Jenkins	Liberal-Conservative	Appointed Postmaster of Charlottetown.	Yes
Cape Breton	July 3, 1884	William McDonald	Conservative	Hector Francis McDougall	Liberal-Conservative	Called to the Senate.	Yes
York	June 29, 1884	John Pickard	Independent Liberal	Thomas Temple	Conservative	Death	No
Cumberland	June 26, 1884	Charles Tupper	Conservative	Charles James Townshend	Liberal-Conservative	Appointed High Commissioner for Canada in the United Kingdom.	Yes
Mégantic	June 10, 1884	Louis-Israël Côté dit Fréchette	Conservative	François Langelier	Liberal	Election declared void.	No
Nicolet	April 16, 1884	François-Xavier-Ovide Méthot	Independent Conservative	Athanase Gaudet	Nationalist Conservative	Appointed to the Legislative Council of Quebec.	No
Bothwell	February 25, 1884	John Joseph Hawkins	Liberal-Conservative	David Mills	Liberal	Election declared void.	No
Kent	January 29, 1884	Henry Smyth	Conservative	Henry Smyth	Conservative	Election declared void.	Yes
Soulanges	December 27, 1883	Georges-Raoul-Léotale-Guichart-Humbert Saveuse de Beaujeu	Conservative	James William Bain	Conservative	Election declared void.	Yes
Middlesex West	December 14, 1883	George William Ross	Liberal	Donald Mackenzie Cameron	Liberal	Election declared void.	Yes
Huron South	December 10, 1883	John McMillan	Liberal	Richard John Cartwright	Liberal	Resignation to provide a seat for Cartwright.	Yes
Lennox	November 26, 1883	John A. Macdonald	Liberal-Conservative	David Wright Allison	Liberal	Election voided. Macdonald was concurrently elected in Carleton and chose to sit for that riding.	No
Lévis	October 25, 1883	Joseph-Godéric Blanchet	Liberal-Conservative	Isidore-Noël Belleau	Conservative	Appointed Collector of Customs for the Port of Quebec.	Yes
Lunenburg	October 10, 1883	Thomas Twining Keefler	Liberal	Charles Edwin Kaulbach	Conservative	Election declared void.	No
Kent	September 22, 1883	Gilbert Anselme Girouard	Conservative	Pierre-Amand Landry	Conservative	Appointed customs collector for Richibucto.	Yes
Halifax	July 24, 1883	Matthew Henry Richey	Liberal-Conservative	John Fitzwilliam Stairs	Conservative	Appointed Lieutenant Governor of Nova Scotia.	Yes
Albert	July 10, 1883	John Wallace	Liberal	John Wallace	Liberal-Conservative	Election declared void.	No
King's County	April 26, 1883	James Edwin Robertson	Liberal	Augustine Colin Macdonald	Liberal-Conservative	Robertson disqualified as he was a member of the Prince Edward Island Legislative Assembly at the time of the election. The seat was adjudicated to MacDonald.	No
Queen's County	February 27, 1883	John Theophilus Jenkins	Liberal-Conservative	Frederick de Sainte-Croix Brecken	Conservative	Jenkins' election being declared void, the seat was adjudicated to Mr. Brecken.	Yes
Joliette	December 7, 1882	Édouard Guilbault	Conservative	Édouard Guilbault	Independent Conservative	Election declared void.	No
King's	November 7, 1882	George Eulas Foster	Conservative	George Eulas Foster	Conservative	Election declared void.	Yes
Soulanges	October 27, 1882	Jacques Philippe Lantier	Conservative	Georges-Raoul-Léotale-Guichart-Humbert Saveuse de Beaujeu	Conservative	Death	Yes
Bagot	September 2, 1882	Joseph-Alfred Mousseau	Conservative	Flavien Dupont	Conservative	Resignation upon appointment as Premier of Quebec.	Yes
Terrebonne	August 16, 1882	Guillaume-Alphonse Nantel	Conservative	Joseph-Adolphe Chapleau	Conservative	Resignation to provide a seat for Chapleau.	Yes

== See also ==
- List of federal by-elections in Canada

== Sources ==
- Parliament of Canada–Elected in By-Elections
