= List of New Democratic Party first ministers =

List of New Democratic Party premiers in Canada

The New Democratic Party (NDP) is a Canadian social democratic political party. The NDP contests both federal elections, and provincial elections in ten of Canada's thirteen provinces and territories. Unlike most other political parties in Canada, the NDP's constitution defines their provincial and territorial counterparts to be affiliates or wings of the same greater political party, rather than independent organizations with a common name.

The NDP has yet to form government at the federal level, but have won at least one election in six provinces and one territory since its establishment. This article is a list of all New Democratic leaders that have served as the prime minister of Canada or a premier in a Canadian province or territory. This list also includes first ministers of the Co-operative Commonwealth Federation, the predecessor to the NDP.

== List ==
Portrait	First minister	Jurisdiction	Term start date(s)	Term end date(s)	Time in office	Elections won
	Tommy Douglas	Saskatchewan	July 10, 1944	November 7, 1961	17 years, 120 days	5 (1944, 1948, 1952, 1956, 1960)
	Woodrow Lloyd	Saskatchewan	November 7, 1961	May 22, 1964	2 years, 197 days	–
	Edward Schreyer	Manitoba	July 15, 1969	October 24, 1977	8 years, 101 days	2 (1969, 1973)
	Allan Blakeney	Saskatchewan	June 30, 1971	May 8, 1982	10 years, 312 days	3 (1971, 1975, 1978)
	Dave Barrett	British Columbia	September 15, 1972	December 22, 1975	3 years, 98 days	1 (1972)
No image	Howard Pawley	Manitoba	November 30, 1981	May 9, 1988	6 years, 161 days	2 (1981, 1986)
	Tony Penikett	Yukon	May 29, 1985	November 6, 1992	7 years, 161 days	2 (1985, 1989)
	Bob Rae	Ontario	October 1, 1990	June 26, 1995	4 years, 268 days	1 (1995)
	Roy Romanow	Saskatchewan	November 1, 1991	February 8, 2001	9 years, 99 days	3 (1991, 1995, 1999)
	Mike Harcourt	British Columbia	November 5, 1991	February 22, 1996	4 years, 109 days	1 (1991)
	Glen Clark	British Columbia	February 22, 1996	August 25, 1999	3 years, 184 days	1 (1996)
No image	Piers McDonald	Yukon	October 19, 1996	May 5, 2000	3 years, 199 days	1 (1996)
	Dan Miller	British Columbia	August 25, 1999	February 24, 2000	183 days	– (interim party leader)
	Gary Doer	Manitoba	October 5, 1999	October 19, 2009	10 years, 14 days	3 (1999, 2003, 2007)
	Ujjal Dosanjh	British Columbia	February 24, 2000	June 5, 2001	1 year, 101 days	–
	Lorne Calvert	Saskatchewan	February 8, 2001	November 21, 2007	6 years, 286 days	1 (2003)
	Darrell Dexter	Nova Scotia	June 19, 2009	October 22, 2013	4 years, 125 days	1 (2009)
	Greg Selinger	Manitoba	October 19, 2009	May 3, 2016	6 years, 197 days	2 (2011, 2016)
	Rachel Notley	Alberta	May 14, 2015	April 30, 2019	3 years, 351 days	1 (2015)
	John Horgan	British Columbia	July 18, 2017	November 18, 2022	5 years, 123 days	2 (2017, 2020)
	David Eby	British Columbia	November 18, 2022	incumbent	3 years, 239 days	1 (2024)
	Wab Kinew	Manitoba	October 18, 2023	incumbent	2 years, 270 days	1 (2023)

== Time in office by jurisidiction ==
Jurisdiction	Time in office (days)	#	First ministers	Ref(s)
Saskatchewan	17,090	5	Tommy Douglas, Woodrow Lloyd, Allan Blakeney, Roy Romanow, and Lorne Calvert	
Manitoba	12,467	5	Edward Schreyer, Howard Pawley, Gary Doer, Greg Selinger, and Wab Kinew (incumbent)	
British Columbia	7,984	7	Dave Barrett, Mike Harcourt, Glen Clark, Dan Miller, Ujjal Dosanjh, John Horgan, and David Eby (incumbent)	
Yukon	4,014	2	Tony Penikett and Piers McDonald	
Ontario	1,730	1	Bob Rae	
Nova Scotia	1,587	1	Darrell Dexter	
Alberta	1,448	1	Rachel Notley	

== See also ==
- List of Green politicians who have held office in Canada
- List of Canadian minor party and independent politicians elected
- Leader of the New Democratic Party
