= George Dormer =

Canadian politician

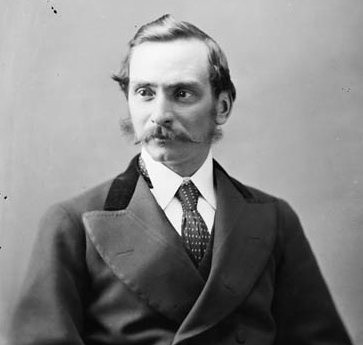

Member of the Canadian Parliament for Victoria South
- In office 1872–1875
- Preceded by: George Kempt
- Succeeded by: Arthur McQuade

Personal details
- Born: October 11, 1838 Kingston, Upper Canada
- Died: June 24, 1875 (aged 36) Lindsay, Ontario
- Party: Conservative

George Dormer (October 11, 1838 – June 24, 1875) was a Canadian lawyer and political figure. He represented Victoria South in the House of Commons of Canada as a Conservative member from 1872 to 1874.

He was born in Kingston, Upper Canada, the son of James Dormer, a Kingston physician, and Mary Pengelly. He was educated at Laval University and Toronto University. In 1859, he married Sarah Marah. He studied law with John A. Macdonald and was called to the bar in 1872. He practised law in Lindsay. Dormer served as mayor of Lindsay from 1871 to 1872. He died there at the age of 36.
