= George Kempt =

Canadian politician

Member of the Canadian Parliament for Victoria South
- In office 1867–1872
- Succeeded by: George Dormer

Personal details
- Born: July 8, 1821 Cromarty, Scotland
- Died: March 9, 1885 (aged 63)
- Party: Liberal
- Spouse: Anne Jane Macaulay

George Kempt (July 8, 1821 – March 9, 1885) was an Ontario businessman and political figure. He represented Victoria South in the 1st Canadian Parliament as a Liberal Party of Canada member.

He was born in Cromarty, Scotland, in 1821, the son of Kenneth Kempt, and came to Peterborough County in Upper Canada with his family in 1831. Kempt was a lumber and grain merchant. He served on the township council for Lindsay, also serving as reeve. In 1872, he was named sheriff for Victoria County.

In 1849, he married Anne Jane Macaulay. He died in Lindsay at the age of 63.
