= By-elections to the 8th Canadian Parliament =

By-elections to the 8th Canadian Parliament were held to elect members of the House of Commons of Canada between the 1896 federal election and the 1900 federal election. The Liberal Party of Canada led a majority government for the 8th Canadian Parliament.

The list includes Ministerial by-elections which occurred due to the requirement that Members of Parliament recontest their seats upon being appointed to Cabinet. These by-elections were almost always uncontested. This requirement was abolished in 1931.

By-election	Date	Incumbent	Party	Winner	Party	Cause	Retained
St. Hyacinthe	July 4, 1900	Michel-Esdras Bernier	Liberal	Michel-Esdras Bernier	Liberal	Recontested upon appointment as Minister of Inland Revenue	Yes
Lotbinière	January 25, 1900	Côme Isaïe Rinfret	Liberal	Edmond Fortier	Liberal	Appointment as a revenue inspector	Yes
Town of Sherbrooke	January 25, 1900	William Bullock Ives	Conservative	John McIntosh	Conservative	Death	Yes
Winnipeg	January 25, 1900	Richard Willis Jameson	Liberal	Arthur Puttee	Labour	Death	Yes
Berthier	January 18, 1900	Cléophas Beausoleil	Liberal	Joseph Éloi Archambault	Liberal	Appointed postmaster of Montreal	Yes
Labelle	January 18, 1900	Henri Bourassa	Liberal	Henri Bourassa	Independent	Resignation to recontest in protest at Canada's participation in the Boer War	No
Chambly—Verchères	January 18, 1900	Christophe-Alphonse Geoffrion	Liberal	Victor Geoffrion	Liberal	Death	Yes
Ontario West	January 18, 1900	James David Edgar	Liberal	Isaac James Gould	Liberal	Death	Yes
Brockville	April 20, 1899	John Fisher Wood	Liberal-Conservative	William Henry Comstock	Liberal	Death	No
Lévis	March 22, 1899	Pierre Malcom Guay	Liberal	Louis-Jules Demers	Liberal	Death	Yes
Huron West	February 21, 1899	Malcolm Colin Cameron	Liberal	Robert Holmes	Liberal	Appointed Lieutenant-Governor of the North-West Territories	Yes
East Prince	December 14, 1898	John Yeo	Liberal	John Howatt Bell	Liberal	Called to the Senate	Yes
Lambton West	December 14, 1898	James Frederick Lister	Liberal	Thomas George Johnston	Liberal	Appointed to the Court of Appeal	
Bagot	December 14, 1898	Flavien Dupont	Conservative	Joseph Edmond Marcile	Liberal	Death	No
Montmagny	December 14, 1898	Philippe-Auguste Choquette	Liberal	Pierre-Raymond-Léonard Martineau	Liberal	Appointed a judge of the Superior Court of Quebec	Yes
Simcoe North	December 14, 1898	Dalton McCarthy	McCarthyite	Leighton McCarthy	Independent (McCarthyite)	Death	Yes
West Prince	April 13, 1898	Stanislaus Francis Perry	Liberal	Bernard Donald McLellan	Liberal	Death	Yes
Quebec-Centre	January 24, 1898	François Langelier	Liberal	Arthur Cyrille Albert Malouin	Liberal	Appointed a judge of the Superior Court of Quebec	Yes
Nicolet	December 21, 1897	Fabien Boisvert	Conservative	Joseph Hector Leduc	Liberal	Death	No
Toronto Centre	November 30, 1897	William Lount	Liberal	George Hope Bertram	Liberal	Resignation	Yes
Drummond—Arthabaska	November 13, 1897	Joseph Lavergne	Liberal	Louis Lavergne	Liberal	Appointed a judge of the Superior Court of Quebec	Yes
Témiscouata	November 6, 1897	Charles-Eugène Pouliot	Liberal	Charles Arthur Gauvreau	Liberal	Death	Yes
Rimouski	November 6, 1897	Jean-Baptiste Romuald Fiset	Liberal	Jean Auguste Ross	Liberal	Called to the Senate	Yes
West Prince	April 27, 1897	Edward Hackett	Liberal-Conservative	Stanislaus Francis Perry	Liberal	Election declared void	No
Macdonald	April 27, 1897	Nathaniel Boyd	Conservative	John Gunion Rutherford	Liberal	Election declared void	No
Winnipeg	April 27, 1897	Hugh John Macdonald	Liberal-Conservative	Richard Willis Jameson	Liberal	Election declared void	No
Colchester	April 20, 1897	Wilbert David Dimock	Conservative	Firman McClure	Liberal	Election declared void	No
Champlain	April 7, 1897	François-Arthur Marcotte	Conservative	François-Arthur Marcotte	Conservative	Election declared void	Yes
Wright	March 23, 1897	Charles Ramsay Devlin	Liberal	Louis Napoléon Champagne	Liberal	Appointed Canadian trade commissioner to Ireland	Yes
Bonaventure	March 17, 1897	William LeBoutillier Fauvel	Liberal	Jean-François Guité	Liberal	Death	Yes
Simcoe East	February 4, 1897	William Humphrey Bennett	Conservative	William Humphrey Bennett	Conservative	Election declared void	Yes
Ontario North	February 4, 1897	John Alexander McGillivray	Conservative	Duncan Graham	Independent Liberal	Election declared void	No
Brant South	February 4, 1897	Robert Henry	Conservative	Charles Bernhard Heyd	Liberal	Election declared void	No
Saskatchewan (Provisional District)	December 19, 1896	Wilfrid Laurier	Liberal	Thomas Osborne Davis	Liberal	Laurier was elected to two seats, resigned to run in ministerial by-election in Quebec East	Yes
Cornwall and Stormont	December 19, 1896	Darby Bergin	Liberal-Conservative	John Goodall Snetsinger	Liberal	Death	No
Brandon	November 27, 1896	Dalton McCarthy	McCarthyite	Clifford Sifton	Liberal	Chose to sit for Simcoe North	No
Sunbury—Queen's	August 25, 1896	George G. King	Liberal	Andrew George Blair	Liberal	Called to Senate	Yes
Grey North	August 25, 1896	John Clark	Liberal	William Paterson	Liberal	Death	Yes
Shelburne and Queen's	August 5, 1896	Francis Gordon Forbes	Liberal	William Stevens Fielding	Liberal	Appointed Sub-Collector of Customs	Yes
St. Johns—Iberville	August 3, 1896	François Béchard	Liberal	Joseph Israël Tarte	Liberal	Called to the Senate	Yes
Quebec County	July 30, 1896	Charles Fitzpatrick	Liberal	Charles Fitzpatrick	Liberal	Recontested upon appointment as Solicitor General	Yes
Kings	July 30, 1896	Frederick William Borden	Liberal	Frederick William Borden	Liberal	Recontested upon appointment as Minister of Militia and Defence	Yes
Oxford South	July 30, 1896	Richard John Cartwright	Liberal	Richard John Cartwright	Liberal	Recontested upon appointment as Minister of Trade and Commerce	Yes
West Queen's	July 30, 1896	Louis Henry Davies	Liberal	Louis Henry Davies	Liberal	Recontested upon appointment as Minister of Marine and Fisheries	Yes
Brome	July 30, 1896	Sydney Arthur Fisher	Liberal	Sydney Arthur Fisher	Liberal	Recontested upon appointment as Minister of Agriculture	Yes
Portneuf	July 30, 1896	Henri-Gustave Joly de Lotbinière	Liberal	Henri-Gustave Joly de Lotbinière	Liberal	Recontested upon appointment as Controller of Inland Revenue	Yes
York North	July 30, 1896	William Mulock	Liberal	William Mulock	Liberal	Recontested upon appointment as Postmaster-General	Yes
Quebec East	July 30, 1896	Wilfrid Laurier	Liberal	Wilfrid Laurier	Liberal	Recontested upon appointment as Prime Minister	Yes

== See also ==
- List of federal by-elections in Canada

== Sources ==
- Parliament of Canada–Elected in By-Elections
