= Thomas Stinson =

Irish-born Canadian businessman

Thomas Stinson (15 July 1798 – 13 March 1864) was a Hamilton, Ontario merchant, banker, and landowner.

== Early life and marriage ==
Stinson was born in 1798 near Drum, County Monaghan, Ireland.

In 1822 Stinson migrated to North America. Briefly staying in Lockport, New York, he moved to Upper Canada in 1826, settling in Clinton Township in the Niagara Peninsula. There he married Margaret Zimmerman, daughter of a Loyalist from the Beamsville, Ontario area.

== Business career ==
The Stinsons moved to Hamilton in 1830 and established a dry goods, grocery, hardware and crockery business on King Street East in the "Stinson Block", the first brick business block in Hamilton. In 1831 he established a branch store in Dundas, Ontario.

He was an extensive landowner in not only in Hamilton, Ontario but as well as Chicago, St. Paul, Minnesota, and Superior City, Wisconsin, which he named.

Stinson also established the Stinson Bank in 1847 on the corner of James and King William Street in Hamilton. It lasted until 1900.

He died 13 March 1864 at Hamilton, Ontario, and is buried in Hamilton Cemetery.

== Tribute ==
The Stinson neighbourhood in Hamilton was named after him. It is bounded by Main Street East (north), Charlton Avenue East (south), Victoria Avenue South (west) and Wentworth Street South (east). Landmarks in this neighbourhood include St. Patrick's Roman Catholic church.
