= By-elections to the 17th Canadian Parliament =

By-elections to the 17th Canadian Parliament were held to elect members of the House of Commons of Canada between the 1930 federal election and the 1935 federal election. The Conservative Party of Canada led a majority government for the 17th Canadian Parliament.

The list includes Ministerial by-elections which occurred due to the requirement that Members of Parliament recontest their seats upon being appointed to Cabinet. These by-elections were almost always uncontested. This requirement was abolished in 1931.

By-election	Date	Incumbent	Party	Winner	Party	Cause	Retained
Frontenac—Addington	September 24, 1934	William Spankie	Conservative	Colin Campbell	Liberal	Death	No
Toronto East	September 24, 1934	Edmond Baird Ryckman	Conservative	Thomas Langton Church	Conservative	Death	Yes
Kenora—Rainy River	September 24, 1934	Peter Heenan	Liberal	Hugh McKinnon	Liberal	Resignation	Yes
Elgin West	September 24, 1934	Mitchell Hepburn	Liberal	Wilson Mills	Liberal	Resignation	Yes
York North	September 24, 1934	Thomas Herbert Lennox	Conservative	William Pate Mulock	Liberal	Death	No
Oxford South	April 16, 1934	Thomas Merritt Cayley	Liberal	Almon Rennie	Liberal	Death	Yes
Yamaska	October 23, 1933	Aimé Boucher	Liberal	Aimé Boucher	Liberal	Election declared void	Yes
Mackenzie	October 23, 1933	Milton Neil Campbell	Progressive	John Angus MacMillan	Liberal	Appointed vice-president of the Tariff Board	No
Restigouche—Madawaska	October 23, 1933	Maxime Cormier	Conservative	Joseph Michaud	Liberal	Death	No
Huron South	October 3, 1932	Thomas McMillan	Liberal	William Henry Golding	Liberal	Death	Yes
Maisonneuve	June 27, 1932	Clément Robitaille	Liberal	Joseph Jean	Liberal	Death	Yes
Royal	June 27, 1932	George Burpee Jones	Conservative	George Burpee Jones	Conservative	Resignation	Yes
Athabaska	March 21, 1932	John Francis Buckley	Liberal	Percy Griffith Davies	Conservative	Death	No
Three Rivers—St. Maurice	August 10, 1931	Arthur Bettez	Liberal	Charles Bourgeois	Conservative	Death	No
Hamilton East	August 10, 1931	George Septimus Rennie	Conservative	Humphrey Mitchell	Labour	Death	No
Richmond—West Cape Breton	September 2, 1930	John Alexander Macdonald	Conservative	Edgar Nelson Rhodes	Conservative	Resignation to provide a seat for Rhodes	Yes
Melfort	August 25, 1930	Robert Weir	Conservative	Robert Weir	Conservative	Recontested upon appointment as Minister of Agriculture.	Yes
Oxford North	August 25, 1930	Donald Matheson Sutherland	Conservative	Donald Matheson Sutherland	Conservative	Recontested upon appointment as Minister of National Defence.	Yes
Leeds	August 25, 1930	Hugh Alexander Stewart	Conservative	Hugh Alexander Stewart	Conservative	Recontested upon appointment as Minister of Public Works.	Yes
Kootenay East	August 25, 1930	Michael Dalton McLean	Conservative	Henry Herbert Stevens	Conservative	Resignation to provide a seat for Stevens	Yes
Laval—Two Mountains	August 25, 1930	Arthur Sauvé	Conservative	Arthur Sauvé	Conservative	Recontested upon appointment as Postmaster General.	Yes
Toronto East	August 25, 1930	Edmond Baird Ryckman	Conservative	Edmond Baird Ryckman	Conservative	Recontested upon appointment as Minister of National Revenue.	Yes
Neepawa	August 25, 1930	Thomas Gerow Murphy	Conservative	Thomas Gerow Murphy	Conservative	Recontested upon appointment as Minister of the Interior.	Yes
Fort William	August 25, 1930	Robert James Manion	Conservative	Robert James Manion	Conservative	Recontested upon appointment as Minister of Railways and Canals.	Yes
St. John—Albert	August 25, 1930	Murray MacLaren	Conservative	Murray MacLaren	Conservative	Recontested upon appointment as Minister of Pensions and National Health.	Yes
Wellington South	August 25, 1930	Hugh Guthrie	Conservative	Hugh Guthrie	Conservative	Recontested upon appointment as Minister of Justice.	Yes
Timiskaming South	August 25, 1930	Wesley Gordon	Conservative	Wesley Gordon	Conservative	Recontested upon appointment as Minister of Immigration and Colonization and Minister of Mines.	Yes
Chambly—Verchères	August 25, 1930	Alfred Duranleau	Conservative	Alfred Duranleau	Conservative	Recontested upon appointment as Minister of Marine.	Yes
Quebec West	August 25, 1930	Maurice Dupré	Conservative	Maurice Dupré	Conservative	Recontested upon appointment as Solicitor General.	Yes
St. Lawrence—St. George	August 25, 1930	Charles Cahan	Conservative	Charles Cahan	Conservative	Recontested upon appointment as Secretary of State of Canada.	Yes
Calgary West	August 25, 1930	R. B. Bennett	Conservative	R. B. Bennett	Conservative	Recontested upon appointment as Prime Minister and Minister of Finance.	Yes

== See also ==
- List of federal by-elections in Canada

== Sources ==
- Parliament of Canada–Elected in By-Elections
