= By-elections to the 16th Canadian Parliament =

By-elections to the 16th Canadian Parliament were held to elect members of the House of Commons of Canada between the 1926 federal election and the 1930 federal election. The Liberal Party of Canada led a minority government for the 16th Canadian Parliament.

The list includes Ministerial by-elections which occurred due to the requirement that Members of Parliament recontest their seats upon being appointed to Cabinet. These by-elections were almost always uncontested. This requirement was abolished in 1931.

By-election	Date	Incumbent	Party	Winner	Party	Cause	Retained
Brandon	February 5, 1930	Robert Forke	Liberal-Progressive	Thomas Alexander Crerar	Liberal	Called to the Senate	No
Bagot	January 27, 1930	Georges Dorèze Morin	Liberal	Cyrille Dumaine	Liberal	Death	Yes
Châteauguay—Huntingdon	January 27, 1930	James Alexander Robb	Liberal	Dennis James O'Connor	Liberal	Death	Yes
Prescott	July 29, 1929	Louis-Mathias Auger	Independent Liberal	Élie-Oscar Bertrand	Liberal	Resignation following criminal charge	No
Lanark	July 29, 1929	Richard Franklin Preston	Conservative	William Samuel Murphy	Independent Conservative	Death	No
Vaudreuil-Soulanges	July 29, 1929	Lawrence Alexander Wilson	Liberal	Lawrence Alexander Wilson	Liberal	Resigned, intending to retire, but persuaded to run again	Yes
Laprairie—Napierville	July 22, 1929	Roch Lanctôt	Liberal	Vincent Dupuis	Liberal	Death	Yes
Frontenac—Addington	July 22, 1929	John Wesley Edwards	Conservative	William Spankie	Conservative	Death	Yes
Lambton West	January 14, 1929	William Goodison	Liberal	Ross Gray	Liberal	Death	Yes
Joliette	December 17, 1928	Jean-Joseph Denis	Liberal	Charles-Édouard Ferland	Liberal	Appointed a judge of the Superior Court of Quebec.	Yes
Victoria	December 6, 1928	Simon Fraser Tolmie	Conservative	D'Arcy Plunkett	Conservative	Resignation to become Premier of British Columbia.	Yes
York West	October 29, 1928	Henry Lumley Drayton	Conservative	Earl Lawson	Conservative	Appointed Chairman of the Liquor Control Board of Ontario.	Yes
Maple Creek	November 25, 1927	George Spence	Liberal	William George Bock	Liberal	Resignation to enter provincial politics in Saskatchewan	Yes
Huron North	September 12, 1927	John Warwick King	Progressive	George Spotton	Liberal	Death	No
Victoria—Carleton	June 16, 1927	James Kidd Flemming	Conservative	Albion Roudolph Foster	Liberal	Death	No
Antigonish—Guysborough	January 18, 1927	John Carey Douglas	Conservative	William Duff	Liberal	Death	No
Kootenay East	November 9, 1926	James Horace King	Liberal	James Horace King	Liberal	Recontested upon appointment as Minister of Soldiers' Civil Re-establishment	Yes
Bruce North	November 9, 1926	James Malcolm	Liberal	James Malcolm	Liberal	Recontested upon appointment as Minister of Trade and Commerce	Yes
Dorchester	November 2, 1926	Lucien Cannon	Liberal	Lucien Cannon	Liberal	Recontested upon appointment as Solicitor General	Yes
Richelieu	November 2, 1926	Arthur Cardin	Liberal	Arthur Cardin	Liberal	Recontested upon appointment as Minister of Marine and Fisheries	Yes
Regina	November 2, 1926	Charles Avery Dunning	Liberal	Charles Avery Dunning	Liberal	Recontested upon appointment as Minister of Railways and Canals.	Yes
Middlesex West	November 2, 1926	John Campbell Elliott	Liberal	John Campbell Elliott	Liberal	Recontested upon appointment as Minister of Public Works.	Yes
Waterloo North	November 2, 1926	William Daum Euler	Liberal	William Daum Euler	Liberal	Recontested upon appointment as Minister of Customs and Excise.	Yes
Brandon	November 2, 1926	Robert Forke	Liberal-Progressive	Robert Forke	Liberal-Progressive	Recontested upon appointment as Minister of Immigration and Colonization	Yes
Kenora—Rainy River	November 2, 1926	Peter Heenan	Liberal	Peter Heenan	Liberal	Recontested upon appointment as Minister of Labour	Yes
Prince Albert	November 2, 1926	William Lyon Mackenzie King	Liberal	William Lyon Mackenzie King	Liberal	Recontested upon appointment as Prime Minister.	Yes
Quebec East	November 2, 1926	Ernest Lapointe	Liberal	Ernest Lapointe	Liberal	Recontested upon appointment as Minister of Justice.	Yes
Melville	November 2, 1926	William Richard Motherwell	Liberal	William Richard Motherwell	Liberal	Recontested upon appointment as Minister of Agriculture.	Yes
Shelburne—Yarmouth	November 2, 1926	Paul Lacombe Hatfield	Liberal	James Ralston	Liberal	Called to the Senate to provide a seat for Ralston	Yes
St. James	November 2, 1926	Fernand Rinfret	Liberal	Fernand Rinfret	Liberal	Recontested upon appointment as Secretary of State of Canada.	Yes
Châteauguay—Huntingdon	November 2, 1926	James Robb	Liberal	James Robb	Liberal	Recontested upon appointment as Minister of Finance.	Yes
Edmonton West	November 2, 1926	Charles Stewart	Liberal	Charles Stewart	Liberal	Recontested upon appointment as Minister of the Interior and Mines.	Yes
Gloucester	November 2, 1926	Peter Veniot	Liberal	Peter Veniot	Liberal	Recontested upon appointment as Postmaster General.	Yes

== See also ==
- List of federal by-elections in Canada

== Sources ==
- Parliament of Canada–Elected in By-Elections
