= Adam Hudspeth =

Canadian politician

Member of the Canadian Parliament for Victoria South
- In office 1887–1890
- Preceded by: Joseph Rutherford Dundas
- Succeeded by: Charles Fairbairn

Personal details
- Born: December 8, 1836 Cobourg, Upper Canada
- Died: May 12, 1890 (aged 53)
- Party: Conservative

Adam Hudspeth (December 8, 1836 – May 12, 1890) was a Canadian lawyer and politician.

Born in Cobourg, Upper Canada, Hudspeth received his education in the Grammar School in Cobourg, under the tutelage of his father, Robert Hudspeth, who was head-master. He studied law and was called to the bar in 1867. A practicing lawyer, he was an unsuccessful candidate to the Legislative Assembly of Ontario in the 1875 election. He was a bencher of the Law Society of Upper Canada and was a deputy judge for the county of Victoria. He was a revising officer under the Electoral Franchise Act, 1885. He was elected to the House of Commons of Canada for the riding of Victoria South in 1887. He was disqualified under the Independence of Parliament Act and resigned as a revising officer. He was re-elected in the resulting 1887 by-election. A Conservative, he served until his death in 1890.
