= Drum, County Monaghan =

Village in County Monaghan, Ulster, Ireland

Drum An Droim
- Village
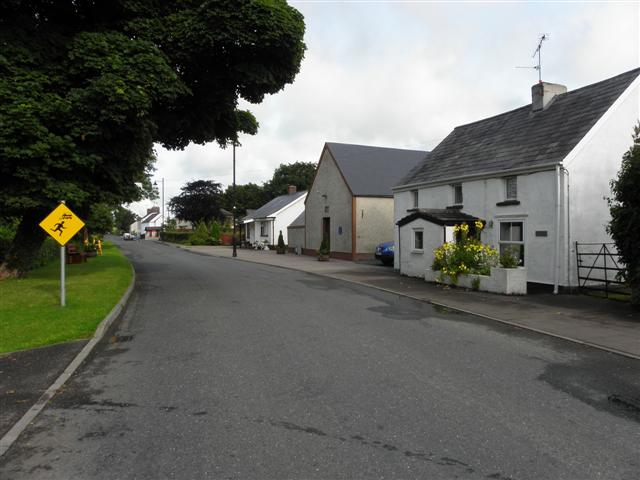
- Road through Drum. The building with the gable towards the road is the Protestant Hall.

- Location in Ireland
- Coordinates: 54.104°N 7.144°W
- Country: Ireland
- Province: Ulster
- County: County Monaghan
- Barony: Dartree

Population (2022)
  - Total: 190
- Time zone: UTC+0 (WET)
  - Summer (DST): UTC-1 (IST (WEST))

Drum (Irish: An Droim, meaning 'the ridge') is a village and townland in the west of County Monaghan in Ireland. It is one of the only Protestant-majority settlements in the Republic of Ireland.

== Location and name ==
Drum is situated between some lakes, such as Drum Lough to the north, Quarry Lough to the west, and Long Lough to the south. It is named for the surrounding drumlin terrain. Local people arranged signage at Drum Lough, which has a high duck population.

The village lies on a minor road off the main Monaghan Town to Cootehill road, and the nearest larger settlements are Cootehill and Newbliss, site of the national writers' and artists' retreat facility, the Tyrone Guthrie Centre at Annaghmakerrig.

== Character ==
Unusually for Ireland, Drum has no Catholic church in the actual village. The nearest Catholic church to the village is St. Joseph's Church, Corrinshigo; also known as Corrinshigo Chapel, parts of which were built c. 1870 and which was significantly altered in the 1960s, and is located less than two miles west of Drum.

Drum has a Church of Ireland church, one of the oldest Presbyterian congregations on the island of Ireland (although the current Presbyterian church was only built in the c. 1820s), a Free Presbyterian church and a Gospel Hall. The village retains a sense of pre-partition Ulster Scots culture. It has a Protestant Hall, which hosts two Orange Lodges and an accordion band; they both host a picnic and march in the village each year. A blue plaque on the wall of the Protestant Hall commemorates John Deyell, who later founded a settlement in Canada. There is also a branch of the Royal Black Preceptory, and the Drum Association, a local development association, which shares premises with the Wee Drummers childcare facility. There is a Protestant primary school, while the nearest secondary school is in Cootehill, a 15-minutes drive away. Drum also participates in the Tidy Towns competition. The village shop and the last local public house closed in the 2010s, and the nearest retail facilities are now in Cootehill.

== Demography ==
As of the 2022 Census 54 (28.4%) of the 190 residents are Catholic while 131 (68.9%) indicated they belonged to an "Other religion".

== Notable people ==
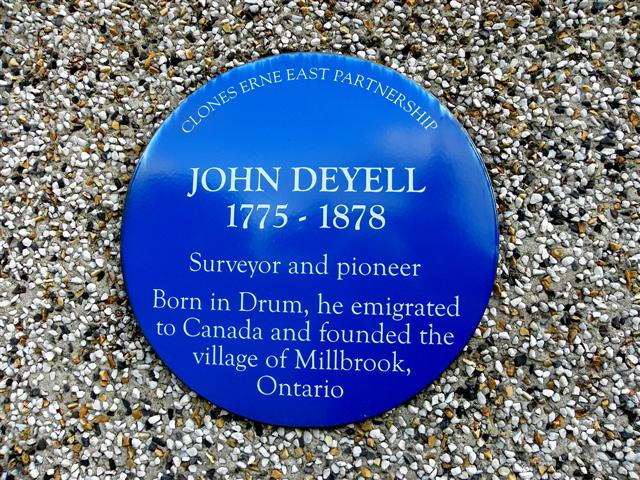
Blue plaque commemorating John Deyell

- Thomas Stinson, 1798–1864, merchant and landowner in Hamilton, Ontario, was born in Drum.
- Joseph Rutherford Dundas, 1836–1896, Canadian merchant and politician
- Heather Humphreys (b. 1963), Irish politician and former Government minister

== See also ==
- List of towns and villages in the Republic of Ireland
