= By-elections to the 11th Canadian Parliament =

By-elections to the 11th Canadian Parliament were held to elect members of the House of Commons of Canada between the 1908 federal election and the 1911 federal election. The Liberal Party of Canada led a majority government for the 11th Canadian Parliament.

The list includes a Ministerial by-election which occurred due to the requirement that Members of Parliament recontest their seats upon being appointed to Cabinet. These by-elections were almost always uncontested. This requirement was abolished in 1931.

By-election	Date	Incumbent	Party	Winner	Party	Cause	Retained
Drummond—Arthabaska	November 3, 1910	Louis Lavergne	Liberal	Arthur Gilbert	Nationalist	Called to the Senate	No
City of Ottawa	January 29, 1910	Sir Wilfrid Laurier	Liberal	Albert Allard	Liberal	Chose to sit for Quebec East.	Yes
Dufferin	December 22, 1909	John Barr	Conservative	John Best	Conservative	Death	Yes
Lunenburg	December 22, 1909	Alexander Kenneth Maclean	Liberal	John Drew Sperry	Liberal	Resignation	Yes
Middlesex West	November 20, 1909	William Samuel Calvert	Liberal	Duncan Campbell Ross	Liberal	Appointed to the National Transcontinental Railway Commission	Yes
Essex North	November 20, 1909	Robert Franklin Sutherland	Liberal	Oliver James Wilcox	Conservative	Appointed a judge	No
Lotbinière	October 26, 1909	Edmond Fortier	Liberal	Edmond Fortier	Liberal	Election declared void	Yes
Strathcona	October 20, 1909	Wilbert McIntyre	Liberal	James McCrie Douglas	Liberal	Death	Yes
Montcalm	September 25, 1909	François Octave Dugas	Liberal	David Arthur Lafortune	Independent Liberal	Appointed a judge of the Superior Court of Quebec	No
Waterloo North	June 21, 1909	William Lyon Mackenzie King	Liberal	William Lyon Mackenzie King	Liberal	Recontested upon appointment as Minister of Labour.	Yes
Carleton	February 22, 1909	Robert Borden	Conservative	Edward Kidd	Conservative	Chose to sit for Halifax	Yes
Comox—Atlin	February 8, 1909	William Sloan	Liberal	William Templeman	Liberal	Resignation to provide a seat for Templeman	Yes

== See also ==
- List of federal by-elections in Canada

== Sources ==
- Parliament of Canada–Elected in By-Elections
