= By-elections to the 13th Canadian Parliament =

By-elections to the 13th Canadian Parliament were held to elect members of the House of Commons of Canada between the 1917 federal election and the 1921 federal election. Prime Minister Robert Borden, then Arthur Meighen, led a majority government consisting members collectively known as the Unionist Party, during the 13th Canadian Parliament.

The list includes Ministerial by-elections which occurred due to the requirement that Members of Parliament recontest their seats upon being appointed to Cabinet. These by-elections were almost always uncontested. This requirement was abolished in 1931.

By-election	Date	Incumbent	Party	Winner	Party	Cause	Retained
Medicine Hat	June 27, 1921	Arthur Lewis Sifton	Unionist	Robert Gardiner	Progressive	Death	No
Yamaska	May 28, 1921	Oscar Gladu	Laurier Liberal	Aimé Boucher	Liberal	Death	Yes
York—Sunbury	May 28, 1921	Harry Fulton McLeod	Unionist	Richard Hanson	Conservative	Death	Yes
Peterborough West	February 7, 1921	John Hampden Burnham	Unionist	George Newcombe Gordon	Liberal	Resignation	No
Yale	November 22, 1920	Martin Burrell	Unionist	John Armstrong MacKelvie	Conservative	Appointed Librarian of Parliament	Yes
Elgin East	November 22, 1920	David Marshall	Unionist	Sydney Smith McDermand	United Farmers	Death	No
St. John—Albert	September 20, 1920	Rupert Wilson Wigmore	Unionist	Rupert Wilson Wigmore	Conservative	Recontested upon appointment as Minister of Customs and Inland Revenue	Yes
Colchester	September 20, 1920	Fleming Blanchard McCurdy	Unionist	Fleming Blanchard McCurdy	Nationalist Liberal	Recontested upon appointment as Minister of Public Works	Yes
Timiskaming	April 7, 1920	Francis Cochrane	Unionist	Angus McDonald	Independent	Death	No
St. James	April 7, 1920	Louis Audet Lapointe	Laurier Liberal	Fernand Rinfret	Liberal	Death	Yes
Kamouraska	March 31, 1920	Ernest Lapointe	Laurier Liberal	Charles Adolphe Stein	Liberal	Resignation to contest Quebec East by-election	Yes
Ontario North	December 9, 1919	Samuel Simpson Sharpe	Conservative	Robert Henry Halbert	Independent	Death	No
Quebec East	October 27, 1919	Wilfrid Laurier	Laurier Liberal	Ernest Lapointe	Laurier Liberal	Death	Yes
Glengarry and Stormont	October 27, 1919	John McMartin	Unionist	John Wilfred Kennedy	United Farmers	Death	No
Assiniboia	October 27, 1919	John Gillanders Turriff	Unionist	Oliver Robert Gould	United Farmers	Called to the Senate	No
Victoria City	October 27, 1919	Simon Fraser Tolmie	Unionist	Simon Fraser Tolmie	Unionist	Recontested upon appointment as Minister of Agriculture.	Yes
Prince	October 20, 1919	Joseph Read	Liberal	William Lyon Mackenzie King	Liberal	Death	Yes
Kingston	October 20, 1919	William Folger Nickle	Conservative	Henry Lumley Drayton	Unionist	Resignation	Yes
Victoria—Carleton	October 17, 1919	Frank Carvell	Unionist	Thomas Wakem Caldwell	United Farmers	Appointed Chairman of the Board of Railway Commissioners	No
Lanark	May 2, 1918	Adelbert Edward Hanna	Unionist	John Alexander Stewart	Unionist	Death	Yes

== See also ==
- List of federal by-elections in Canada

== Sources ==
- Parliament of Canada–Elected in By-Elections
