= By-elections to the 21st Canadian Parliament =

By-elections to the 21st Canadian Parliament were held to fill vacancies in the House of Commons of Canada between the 1949 federal election and the 1953 federal election. The Liberal Party of Canada led a majority government for the 21st Canadian Parliament.

30 vacant seats were filled through by-elections.

By-election	Date	Incumbent	Party	Winner	Party	Cause	Retained
Outremont—St-Jean	October 6, 1952	Édouard-G. Rinfret	Liberal	Romuald Bourque	Liberal	Appointed a Judge of the Court of Queen's Bench of Quebec	Yes
Richelieu—Verchères	October 6, 1952	Gérard Cournoyer	Liberal	Lucien Cardin	Liberal	Resignation	Yes
Ontario	May 26, 1952	Walter Cunningham Thomson	Liberal	Michael Starr	Progressive Conservative	Resignation	No
Gloucester	May 26, 1952	Clovis-Thomas Richard	Liberal	Albany M. Robichaud	Progressive Conservative	Resignation	No
Victoria—Carleton	May 26, 1952	Heber Harold Hatfield	Progressive Conservative	Gage W. Montgomery	Progressive Conservative	Death	Yes
Brome—Missisquoi	May 26, 1952	Henri A. Gosselin	Liberal	Joseph-Léon Deslières	Liberal	Death	Yes
Roberval	May 26, 1952	Joseph-Alfred Dion	Liberal	Paul-Henri Spence	Progressive Conservative	Appointed a Superior Court Judge of Quebec	No
Waterloo North	May 26, 1952	Louis Orville Breithaupt	Liberal	Norman C. Schneider	Liberal	Appointed Lieutenant Governor of Ontario	Yes
Calgary West	December 10, 1951	Arthur LeRoy Smith	Progressive Conservative	Carl Olof Nickle	Progressive Conservative	Resignation	Yes
Brandon	June 25, 1951	James Ewen Matthews	Liberal	Walter Dinsdale	Progressive Conservative	Death	No
Queen's	June 25, 1951	J. Lester Douglas	Liberal	J. Angus MacLean	Progressive Conservative	Death	No
Waterloo South	June 25, 1951	Karl Homuth	Progressive Conservative	Howie Meeker	Progressive Conservative	Death	Yes
Winnipeg South Centre	June 25, 1951	Ralph Maybank	Liberal	Gordon Churchill	Progressive Conservative	Resignation	No
Rimouski	October 16, 1950	Gleason Belzile	Liberal	Joseph-Hervé Rousseau	Independent Liberal	Death	No
St. Mary	October 16, 1950	Gaspard Fauteux	Liberal	Hector Dupuis	Liberal	Resignation	Yes
Welland	October 16, 1950	Humphrey Mitchell	Liberal	William H. McMillan	Liberal	Death	Yes
Joliette—L'Assomption—Montcalm	October 3, 1950	Georges-Émile Lapalme	Liberal	Maurice Breton	Liberal	Resignation	Yes
Annapolis—Kings	June 19, 1950	Angus Alexander Elderkin	Liberal	George Clyde Nowlan	Progressive Conservative	Election declared void	No
Cartier	June 19, 1950	Maurice Hartt	Liberal	Leon Crestohl	Liberal	Death	Yes
Halifax	June 19, 1950	Gordon B. Isnor	Liberal	Sam Balcom	Liberal	Called to the Senate	Yes
Broadview	May 15, 1950	Thomas Langton Church	Progressive Conservative	George Hees	Progressive Conservative	Death	Yes
Hamilton West	May 15, 1950	Colin W. G. Gibson	Liberal	Ellen Fairclough	Progressive Conservative	Appointed a Judge of the Supreme Court of Ontario	No
Gatineau	October 24, 1949	Léon-Joseph Raymond	Liberal	Joseph-Célestin Nadon	Liberal	Appointed Clerk of the House of Commons	Yes
Kamouraska	October 24, 1949	Eugène Marquis	Liberal	Arthur Massé (Note: Massé defeated the official Liberal candidate.)	Independent Liberal	Appointed a Superior Court Judge of Quebec	No
Laurier	October 24, 1949	Ernest Bertrand	Liberal	J.-Eugène Lefrancois	Liberal	Appointed a Judge of the Court of King's Bench of Quebec	Yes
Mercier	October 24, 1949	Joseph Jean	Liberal	Marcel Monette	Liberal	Appointed a Judge of the Supreme Court of the District of Montreal	Yes
Greenwood	October 24, 1949	J. Ernest McMillin	Progressive Conservative	James Macdonnell	Progressive Conservative	Death	Yes
New Westminster	October 24, 1949	Tom Reid	Liberal	William Malcolm Mott	Liberal	Called to the Senate	Yes
Restigouche—Madawaska	October 24, 1949	Benoît Michaud	Liberal	Paul-Léon Dubé	Independent Liberal	Death	No
Jacques Cartier	October 4, 1949	Elphège Marier	Liberal	Edgar Leduc	Independent	Appointed a Superior Court Judge of Quebec	No

== See also ==
- List of federal by-elections in Canada
