= By-elections to the 18th Canadian Parliament =

By-elections to the 18th Canadian Parliament were held to fill vacancies in the House of Commons of Canada between the 1935 federal election and the 1940 federal election. The Liberal Party of Canada led a majority government for the 18th Canadian Parliament.

31 vacant seats were filled through by-elections.

By-election	Date	Incumbent	Party	Winner	Party	Cause	Retained
Prince	January 2, 1940	Alfred Edgar MacLean	Liberal	James Layton Ralston	Liberal	Death	Yes
Saskatoon City	December 18, 1939	Alexander MacGillivray Young	Liberal	Walter George Brown	United Reform Movement	Death	No
St. James	December 18, 1939	Fernand Rinfret	Liberal	Eugène Durocher	Liberal	Death	Yes
Jacques Cartier	December 18, 1939	Vital Mallette	Liberal	Elphège Marier	Liberal	Death	Yes
Kent	December 11, 1939	James Rutherford	Liberal	Arthur Lisle Thompson	Liberal	Death	Yes
Calgary West	September 18, 1939	R. B. Bennett	Conservative	Douglas Cunnington	Conservative	Resignation	Yes
Brandon	November 14, 1938	David Wilson Beaubier	Conservative	James Ewen Matthews	Liberal	Death	No
London	November 14, 1938	Frederick Cronyn Betts	Conservative	Robert James Manion	Conservative	Death	Yes
Waterloo South	November 14, 1938	Alexander Edwards	Conservative	Karl Homuth	Conservative	Death	Yes
Cartier	November 7, 1938	Samuel William Jacobs	Liberal	Peter Bercovitch	Liberal	Death	Yes
Edmonton East	March 21, 1938	William Samuel Hall	Social Credit	Orvis A. Kennedy	Social Credit	Death	Yes
Argenteuil	February 28, 1938	George H. Perley	Conservative	Georges Héon	Independent Conservative	Death	No
St. John—Albert	February 21, 1938	William Ryan	Liberal	Allan McAvity	Liberal	Death	Yes
St. Henry	January 17, 1938	Paul Mercier	Liberal	Joseph Arsène Bonnier	Liberal	Appointed a Circuit Court Judge of Montreal	Yes
Lotbinière	December 27, 1937	Joseph-Achille Verville	Liberal	Joseph-Napoléon Francoeur	Liberal	Death	Yes
Victoria	November 29, 1937	Simon Fraser Tolmie	Conservative	Robert Mayhew	Liberal	Death	No
Dufferin—Simcoe	November 8, 1937	William Earl Rowe	Conservative	William Earl Rowe	Conservative	Resignation	Yes
Frontenac—Addington	November 1, 1937	Colin Campbell	Liberal	Angus Neil McCallum	Liberal	Resignation	Yes
Cape Breton North and Victoria	October 18, 1937	Daniel Alexander Cameron	Liberal	Matthew Maclean	Liberal	Death	Yes
Renfrew North	April 5, 1937	Matthew McKay	Liberal	Ralph Warren	Liberal	Death	Yes
Hamilton West	March 22, 1937	Herbert Earl Wilton	Conservative	John Allmond Marsh	Conservative	Death	Yes
Bonaventure	March 22, 1937	Charles Marcil	Liberal	Pierre-Emile Cote	Liberal	Death	Yes
Ottawa East	October 26, 1936	Edgar-Rodolphe-Eugène Chevrier	Liberal	Joseph Albert Pinard	Liberal	Appointed a judge of the High Court of Justice of Ontario	Yes
Gloucester	August 17, 1936	Peter Veniot	Liberal	Clarence Joseph Veniot	Liberal	Death	Yes
Wright	August 3, 1936	Fizalam-William Perras	Liberal	Rodolphe Leduc	Liberal	Death	Yes
Victoria	June 8, 1936	D'Arcy Plunkett	Conservative	Simon Tolmie	Conservative	Death	Yes
Antigonish—Guysborough	March 16, 1936	William Duff	Liberal	J. Ralph Kirk	Liberal	Called to the Senate	Yes
Portneuf	January 27, 1936	Lucien Cannon	Liberal	Pierre Gauthier	Liberal	Appointed a Superior Court Judge of Quebec	Yes
Assiniboia	January 6, 1936	Robert McKenzie	Liberal	James Garfield Gardiner	Liberal	Resignation to provide a seat for Gardiner	Yes
Queen's	December 30, 1935	J. James Larabee	Liberal	Charles Avery Dunning	Liberal	Appointed a Fisheries Protection Officer	Yes

== See also ==
- List of federal by-elections in Canada

== Sources ==
- Parliament of Canada–Elected in By-Elections
