= Vancouver Island (electoral district) =

Vancouver Island was a federal electoral district in British Columbia, Canada, that was represented in the House of Commons of Canada from 1871 to 1872. It was created when the province of British Columbia joined Confederation in 1871.

Like other ridings established in that year, a by-election was called to fill the seat until the general election of 1872. The riding was composed of all those parts of the former Crown Colony of Vancouver Island and adjoining islands and islets, excluding the area around the capital, Victoria District. The 1871 names were all temporary pending ratification of the riding system by the provincial legislature. In 1872, this riding was abolished, and replaced by Vancouver riding.

== Election results ==
Canadian federal by-election, 1871
Party	Candidate	Votes	%
Conservative	Robert Wallace	137	57.32
Unknown	John Jessop	102	42.68
Total valid votes		239	100.00
By-elections were held to fill the temporary seats created when British Columbia joined Confederation. General elections were not held until the following year.

== See also ==
- List of Canadian federal electoral districts
- Historical federal electoral districts of Canada
