= Joseph Rutherford Dundas =

Irish-born Canadian politician

Joseph Rutherford Dundas (January 20, 1836 – January 24, 1896) was an Irish-born merchant and political figure in Ontario, Canada. He represented Victoria South in the House of Commons of Canada from 1882 to 1887 as a Conservative member.

He was born in Drum, County Monaghan, the son of John Dundas, and came to the Province of Canada in 1848, settling in Peterborough. In 1856, Dundas moved to Lindsay working in William Cluxton's dry goods store at the northeast corner of William and Kent Streets. In 1860, having been promoted to partner by William Cluxton, the business changed its name to Cluxton & Dundas. The dry goods store would operate under this name until 1870 when Cluxton sold his interest to Dundas. He married Caroline Jones in 1864. Dundas was involved in the grain trade and also served as a director of the Midland Railway.
