= Alphonse-Télesphore Lépine =

Canadian politician

Alphonse-Télesphore Lépine (15 May 1855 – 19 August 1943) was a Canadian journalist, printer and political figure in Quebec. He represented Montreal East in the House of Commons of Canada from 1888 to 1896 as an Independent Conservative member. His name also appears as Alphonse-Télesphore Legris dit Lépine in some sources.

He was born in Quebec City, Canada East, the son of Charles Lépine and Eleonore Lessard. In 1883, he married Alexandrine Scott. Lépine was sub-editor for the Quotidien de Levis. He owned a printing business in Montreal. He was first elected to the House of Commons in an 1888 by-election held after the death of Charles-Joseph Coursol. He was a member of the Knights of Labour and secretary of the Montreal Trades and Labour Council. Lépine was an unsuccessful candidate in the federal riding of St. Mary in 1896.

A park in Montreal was named in his honour.

By-election on 26 September 1888 On Mr. Coursol's death, 4 August 1888
Party	Candidate	Votes
Independent Conservative	Alphonse-Télesphore Lépine	3,818
Unknown	Poirier	3,155

1891 Canadian federal election: Montreal East
Party	Candidate	Votes
Independent Conservative	Alphonse-Télesphore Lépine	5,840
Liberal	L.O. David	5,015
