= Robert Wallace (Canadian politician) =

Canadian politician

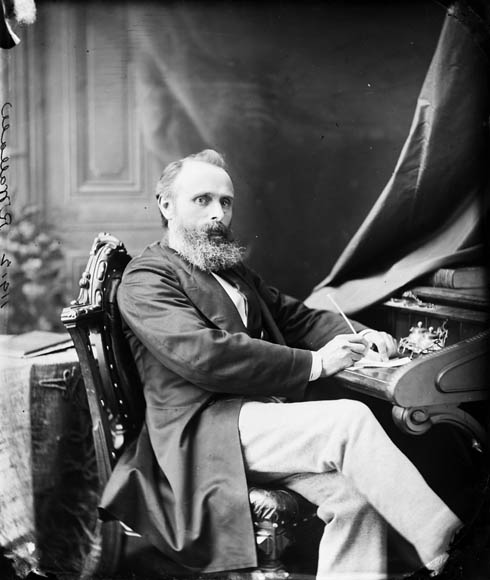

Member of the Canadian Parliament for Vancouver Island
- In office 15 December 1871 – 8 July 1872
- Preceded by: riding established
- Succeeded by: riding abolished

Personal details
- Born: 8 December 1820 Glasgow, Scotland
- Died: 1899 (aged 78–79)
- Party: Conservative
- Spouse: Jean Cameron (m. 1843)
- Occupation: commission merchant, politician

Robert Wallace (8 December 1820 – 1899) was a Canadian businessman and politician. Wallace served as a Member of Parliament, representing the Vancouver Island riding in British Columbia during the final months of the 1st Canadian Parliament from 15 December 1871 until 8 July 1872 as part of the Conservative party.

The son of Robert Wallace and Margaret Stewart, he was educated in Glasgow and later came to Canada. In 1843, he married Jean Cameron. Wallace was a commission merchant in Victoria, British Columbia. He was president of the convention of delegates to the "Confederation League" held in Yale, British Columbia in 1868 which had the aim of speeding up the entry of British Columbia into Confederation. Wallace also served as a member of the city council for Victoria from 1863 to 1864. He did not run for reelection to the House of Commons in 1872. In 1887, Wallace returned to Scotland.

Research by employees of the Public Archives of Canada and the Library of Parliament found no record of his death.

== Electoral history ==
Note: Winners of each election are in bold.

Special byelection, 1871^{1}
Party	Candidate	Votes	%	±	Expenditures
Conservative	**Robert Wallace**	**137**	**57.32%**		
Unknown	John Jessop	102	42.68%		
Total valid votes		239			
^{1} By-elections were held to fill the temporary seats created when British Columbia joined Confederation. General elections were not held until the following year.
