= Arthur McQuade =

Canadian politician

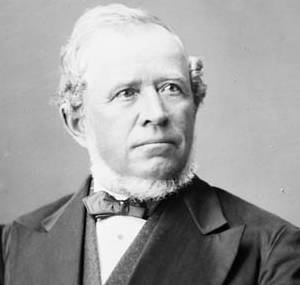
Arthur McQuade Source: Library and Archives Canada

Arthur McQuade (1817 – January 21, 1884) was an Irish-born farmer and political figure in Ontario, Canada. He represented Victoria South in the House of Commons of Canada from 1874 to 1882 as a Conservative member.

He was born in Lisnabuntry townland, County Cavan, the son of Henry McQuade and Mary Curran. In 1841, he married Susannah Trotter. McQuade was deputy reeve and then reeve for Emily Township. He also served as lieutenant in the county militia and was county Master for the Orange Lodge. He operated at farm near Omemee. McQuade died in Emily Township at the age of 67.
