= Victoria South (federal electoral district) =

Former federal electoral district in Ontario, Canada

Victoria South was a federal electoral district represented in the House of Commons of Canada from 1867 to 1904. It was located in the province of Ontario. It was created by the British North America Act 1867, which divided Victoria County divided into two ridings, the South and North Ridings. The South Riding consisted of the Townships of Ops, Mariposa, Emily, Verulam, and the Town of Lindsay.

The electoral district was abolished in 1903 when it was amalgamated into Victoria riding.

== Electoral history ==
1867 Canadian federal election: Victoria South
Party	Candidate	Votes	%	±%
Liberal	George Kempt	1,001		
Unknown	Hector Cameron	801		

1872 Canadian federal election: Victoria South
Party	Candidate	Votes	%	±%
Conservative	DORMER, George	1,228		
Unknown	MCLENNAN,	1,070		

1874 Canadian federal election: Victoria South
Party	Candidate	Votes	%	±%
Conservative	MCQUADE, Arthur	1,292		
Unknown	MCLENNAN, J.	1,223		

1878 Canadian federal election: Victoria South
Party	Candidate	Votes	%	±%
Conservative	MCQUADE, Arthur	1,705		
Unknown	CONNOLLY, J.	1,281		

1882 Canadian federal election: Victoria South
Party	Candidate	Votes	%	±%
Conservative	DUNDAS, Joseph R.	1,577		
Unknown	NEEDLAR, William	1,517		

1887 Canadian federal election: Victoria South
Party	Candidate	Votes	%	±%
Conservative	HUDSPETH, Adam	1,914		
Liberal	LOUNSBOROUGH, Wm.	1,867		

By-election: On Mr. Hudspeth's resignation, 20 April 1887: Victoria South
Party	Candidate	Votes	%	±%
Conservative	HUDSPETH, Adam	1,927		
Liberal	NEEDLER, William	1,873		

By-election: On Mr. Hudspeth's death, 18 December 1890: Victoria South
Party	Candidate	Votes	%	±%
Liberal-Conservative	FAIRBAIRN, Charles	acclaimed		

1891 Canadian federal election: Victoria South
Party	Candidate	Votes	%	±%
Liberal-Conservative	FAIRBAIRN, Charles	2,055		
Liberal	WALTERS, Thomas	2,030		

By-election: Election declared void, 11 February 1892: Victoria South
Party	Candidate	Votes	%	±%
Liberal-Conservative	FAIRBAIRN, Charles	2,402|		
Liberal	WALTERS, Thomas	2,180		

1896 Canadian federal election: Victoria South
Party	Candidate	Votes	%	±%
Liberal	MCHUGH, Geo.	2,051		
Conservative	VROOMAN, Adam E.	1,989		

1900 Canadian federal election: Victoria South
Party	Candidate	Votes	%	±%
Conservative	VROOMAN, Adam Edward	2,337		
Liberal	MCHUGH, George	2,121		

== See also ==
- List of Canadian electoral districts
- Historical federal electoral districts of Canada
