= Arthur Massé =

Canadian politician

Member of Parliament for Kamouraska
- In office October 1949 – June 1957

Personal details
- Born: 30 October 1894 Kamouraska, Quebec, Canada
- Died: 25 October 1972 (aged 77) Laval, Quebec
- Party: Independent liberal
- Spouse(s): Yvonne Boucher (m. 14 November 1921)
- Profession: forest engineer, land surveyor, professor

Arthur Massé (30 October 1894 – 25 October 1972) was a Canadian forest engineer, land surveyor and professor and politician. Masse served as an Independent Liberal member of the House of Commons of Canada. He was born in Kamouraska, Quebec.

Massé was educated at Ste-Anne-de-la-Pocatière College. He then graduated from Université Laval with a Bachelor of Arts degree, where he would later serve as a professor.

He was first elected to Parliament at the Kamouraska riding in the 1949 general election then re-elected for a second term in 1953. Massé became a Liberal party candidate in the 1957 election but was defeated by independent candidate Benoît Chabot.
