= Montreal East (electoral district) =

Former federal electoral district in Quebec, Canada

Quebec electoral district

Defunct federal electoral district
- Legislature: House of Commons
- District created: 1867
- District abolished: 1892
- First contested: 1867
- Last contested: 1891

Montreal East (French: Montréal-Est, pronounced [mɔ̃ʁeal ɛst]) was a federal electoral district in Quebec, Canada, that was represented in the House of Commons of Canada from 1867 to 1892.

It was created by the British North America Act, 1867. It consisted of the St. Lewis Ward, St. James Ward and the St. Mary's Ward. It was abolished in 1892 when it was redistributed into St. James, St. Lawrence and St. Mary ridings.

== Members of Parliament ==
This riding elected the following members of Parliament:

Parliament	Years	Member	Party
Montreal East
1st	1867–1872	George-Étienne Cartier	Liberal–Conservative
2nd	1872–1874	Louis-Amable Jetté	Liberal
3rd	1874–1878	Louis-Amable Jetté	Liberal
4th	1878–1882	Charles-Joseph Coursol	Conservative
5th	1882–1887	Charles-Joseph Coursol	Conservative
6th	1887–1888	Charles-Joseph Coursol	Conservative
6th	1888–1891	Alphonse-Télesphore Lépine	Independent Conservative
7th	1891–1896	Alphonse-Télesphore Lépine	Independent Conservative
Riding dissolved into St. James, St. Lawrence and St. Mary

== Election results ==
1867 Canadian federal election: Montreal East
Party	Candidate	Votes
Liberal–Conservative	George-Étienne Cartier	2,431
Liberal	M. Lanctot	2,085
Source: Canadian Elections Database

1872 Canadian federal election: Montreal East
Party	Candidate	Votes
Liberal	Louis-Amable Jetté	3,264
Liberal–Conservative	George-Étienne Cartier	2,007
Source: Canadian Elections Database

1874 Canadian federal election: Montreal East
Party	Candidate	Votes
Liberal	Louis-Amable Jetté	acclaimed
Source: lop.parl.ca

1878 Canadian federal election: Montreal East
Party	Candidate	Votes
Conservative	Charles-Joseph Coursol	4,626
Unknown	F.X. Archambeault	3,234

1882 Canadian federal election: Montreal East
Party	Candidate	Votes
Conservative	Charles-Joseph Coursol	acclaimed

1887 Canadian federal election: Montreal East
Party	Candidate	Votes
Conservative	Charles-Joseph Coursol	acclaimed

By-election on 26 September 1888 On Mr. Coursol's death, 4 August 1888
Party	Candidate	Votes
Independent Conservative	Alphonse-Télesphore Lépine	3,818
Unknown	Poirier	3,155

1891 Canadian federal election: Montreal East
Party	Candidate	Votes
Independent Conservative	Alphonse-Télesphore Lépine	5,840
Liberal	L.O. David	5,015

== See also ==
- List of Canadian electoral districts
- Historical federal electoral districts of Canada
