= Charles Fairbairn =

Canadian politician

Charles W. Fairbairn (4 July 1837 – 26 April 1911) was a farmer, businessman and political figure in Ontario, Canada. He represented Victoria South in the House of Commons of Canada from 1890 to 1896 as a Liberal-Conservative member.

He was born near Lakefield, Ontario, the son of a Scottish immigrant, and was educated in Peterborough. In 1861, he married Heather Fee. Fairbairn served on the town council for Bobcaygeon and was reeve for Verulam Township. He also served as warden for Victoria County in 1879. He was an unsuccessful candidate for a seat in the Ontario legislative assembly in 1883 and 1890. Fairbairn was first elected to the House of Commons in an 1890 by-election held after the death of Adam Hudspeth; that election was declared void but he won the by-election which followed in 1891.

A rural post office in Verulam Township was named Fairbairn in his honour.
