= Charles-Joseph Coursol =

Canadian politician

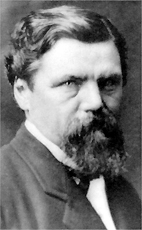

13th Mayor of Montreal
- In office 1871–1873
- Preceded by: William Workman
- Succeeded by: Francis Cassidy
- Constituency: Saint-Antoine

Personal details
- Born: 3 October 1819 Fort Malden, Upper Canada
- Died: 4 August 1888 (aged 68) Montmagny, Quebec, Canada
- Resting place: Notre Dame des Neiges Cemetery
- Party: Tory
- Education: Petit Séminaire de Montréal
- Profession: lawyer

Charles-Joseph Coursol, QC (3 October 1819 – 4 August 1888) was a Canadian lawyer and politician, the Mayor of Montreal, Quebec between 1871 and 1873, and a member of Canadian Parliament from 1878 until his death.

Baptised Michel-Joseph-Charles Coursol, he was born at Fort Malden, Upper Canada, located at what is now Amherstburg, Ontario. He was the son of Michel Coursol (d.1820), of the Hudson's Bay Company, and Marie-Mélanie Quesnel, daughter of Joseph Quesnel. His father died before he was one year old, and he was adopted and brought up like a son in the home of his uncle, The Hon. Frédéric-Auguste Quesnel.

His early education was at the Petit Séminaire de Montréal, and afterwards he was apprenticed to his step-father Côme-Séraphin Cherrier for the legal profession until his formal installation as a lawyer on 24 February 1841.

During his legal career in Montreal, he was a city councillor in Saint-Antoine ward between 1853 and 1855. Coursol left politics for numerous years, yet maintained a high profile in the Montreal community with other activities such as business and culture. He returned to local politics and was acclaimed Mayor in both 1871 and 1872. During that time, Coursol established urban parks for public use.

After he left the Mayor's office, Coursol served as President of the Saint-Jean-Baptiste Society from 1872 to 1876. His attention turned to national politics, winning the Montreal East riding for the Conservatives in the 1878 federal election. He served second and third terms in the riding, running uncontested in the 1882 and 1887 federal elections. However, Coursol died in office at Montmagny, Quebec on 4 August 1888.

Coursol's honours included Spain's Order of Charles III in 1872, then his appointment as Queen's Counsel in February 1873.

After his death in 1888, he was entombed at the Notre Dame des Neiges Cemetery in Montreal.

== Electoral record ==
1878 Canadian federal election: Montreal East
| Party | Candidate | Votes |
|---|---|---|
| Conservative | Charles-Joseph Coursol | 4,626 |
| Unknown | F.X. Archambeault | 3,234 |

1882 Canadian federal election: Montreal East
| Party | Candidate | Votes |
|---|---|---|
| Conservative | Charles-Joseph Coursol | acclaimed |

1887 Canadian federal election: Montreal East
| Party | Candidate | Votes |
|---|---|---|
| Conservative | Charles-Joseph Coursol | acclaimed |

== Archives ==
There is a Charles-Joseph Coursol fonds at Library and Archives Canada. Archival reference is R6101.
