= John Pickard (politician) =

Canadian politician

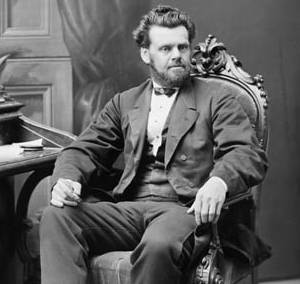
John Pickard

John Pickard (27 April 1824 – 17 December 1883) was a New Brunswick businessman and political figure. He represented York in the House of Commons of Canada as an Independent Liberal from 1868 to 1883.

He was born in Douglas, New Brunswick in 1824 and began work with his father there. He later established himself as a merchant in Fredericton and a lumber merchant in York County. In partnership with Thomas Temple, he owned and operated a sawmill at Fredericton. He helped found the People's Bank of New Brunswick in 1864 and a director of the New Brunswick Railway. In 1865, he ran against Charles Fisher in York as an opponent of Confederation and was defeated. He was elected to represent York in the Legislative Assembly of New Brunswick in an 1867 by-election after Fisher ran for a seat in the House of Commons. When Fisher was appointed judge, Pickard was elected to the federal parliament in an 1868 by-election. He supported Alexander Mackenzie during Mackenzie's term as prime minister.

He died in Fredericton in 1883.
