= Ministerial by-election =

Former type of by-election in Westminster systems

From 1708 to 1926, members of parliament (MPs) of the House of Commons of Great Britain (and later the United Kingdom) automatically vacated their seats when made ministers in government and had to successfully contest a by-election in order to rejoin the House; such ministerial by-elections were imported into the constitutions of several colonies of the British Empire, where they were likewise all abolished by the mid-20th century. The requirement of MPs to rejoin the House upon ministerial appointment arose from 17th-century ideas of the independence of the House from the influence of the Crown, which appoints the ministers. Unlike in the United States, whose constitution took such ideas to the extreme by fully separating the executive and legislative branches, support for some royal patronage meant that whilst MPs were barred from keeping their seats when made ministers, ministers holding an existing portfolio were not required to surrender their office when elected as an MP. This resulted in a compromise where newly appointed ministers had to resign from the House, but could keep their office if they won a by-election back into it.

In practice this by-election was usually a formality, uncontested by the opposition, and was gradually reformed starting from the late 19th century; the change of an existing minister's portfolio did not trigger a by-election after 1867, the necessity for by-elections was temporarily suspended during the First World War, and by-elections were no longer needed for ministerial appointments within nine months of a general election after 1919. Ministerial by-elections were criticised as an inconvenience to the government, and were argued to hold back potential executive talent that represented marginal constituencies where a by-election was risky. Nevertheless, supporters of the practice frustrated attempts at its abolition, arguing that it provided a check on the government in an era where general elections were few and far between and allowed a constituency to avoid having its MP appointed to national office without its consent. As parliaments became shorter-lived, the inconvenience of ministerial by-elections to governments became more acute, especially for governments with small majorities and in times where the opposition and special interest groups contested them, and they were abolished in 1926 by a private member's bill.

The Irish Free State, the Union of South Africa, Southern Rhodesia, India, and New Zealand never had ministerial by-elections. In Canada, where such elections had played a role in the King–Byng constitutional crisis of 1926, they were abolished federally in 1931 and in the various provinces between 1926 and 1941; Newfoundland, which would not join Canada until 1949, abolished them in 1928. Australia never had such elections federally, but the states had them prior to the 20th century; Western Australia was the last jurisdiction in the British Empire to maintain such elections, finally abolishing them in 1947.

In many countries with political systems different from the British-derived Westminster system, such as a presidential or dualistic system, executive officers cannot be sitting legislators at the same time. The appointment of a legislator to executive office thus triggers a vacancy in the legislature. If the normal rule for filling these vacancies is holding a by-election, such a country would thus have a form of ministerial by-elections, albeit different from the historical practice in Britain.

== Britain ==
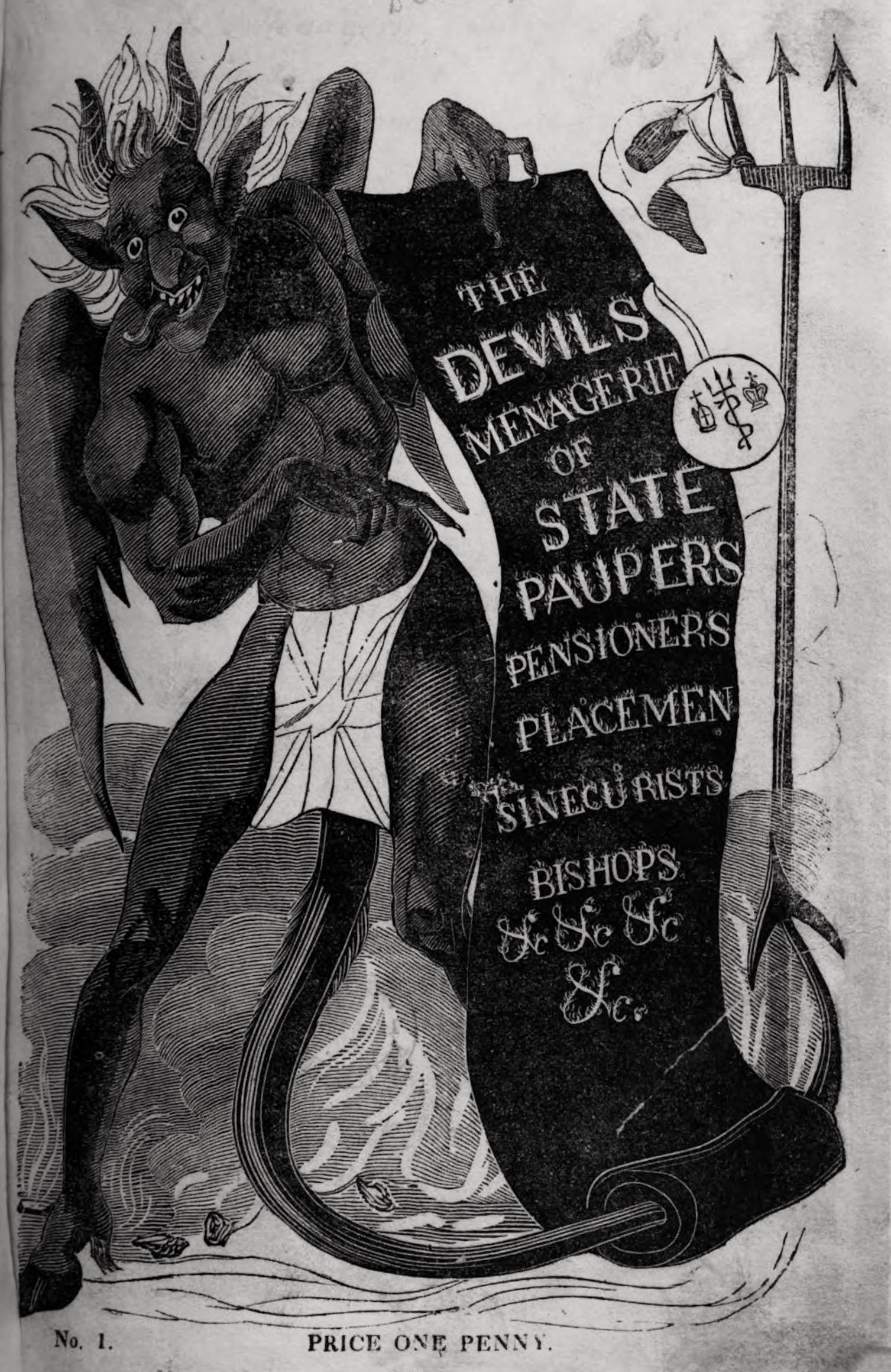
Cover of an 1832 list of British placemen

In 1680, the House of Commons of England resolved that accepting an office of profit from the Crown without the House's permission would cause resignation from the House. (Note: As direct resignation from the House is prohibited by a resolution passed in 1624, the two obsolete offices of Crown Steward and Bailiff of the Chiltern Hundreds and Steward of the Manor of Northstead are still used as sinecures to allow for de facto resignation, as were historically many others.) This was a reaction to the actions of monarchs who attempted to influence the Commons by staffing it with their favourites, or "placemen"; even after the Glorious Revolution of 1688, 120 of the 558 MPs had some sort of patronage from Queen Anne. The Act of Settlement 1701 included a clause barring those holding office under the Crown from membership of the Commons. This, theoretically, produced the system used in the States General of the Netherlands and Parliament of Belgium today, where ministers, though accountable to the assembly, may not sit as legislators. The United States Constitution would later include a similar provision motivated by concerns of executive patronage in the legislature.

However, that clause was not scheduled to come into effect until Anne's death, which would not occur until 1714. In the meantime, Whigs desired to maintain a strong executive for the Hanoverian monarchs who would succeed Anne, whereas Tories wished to check the power of royal placemen. Tory desires to maintain the absolute ban on placemen in the House were narrowly defeated during the making of the Regency Act 1705, while a Whig compromise to limit them to 40 was passed but modified in the House of Lords. The Lords replaced the original list of offices that placemen could hold with a negative list of offices that would disqualify one from the Commons; while the Lords wished mainly to add certain prize offices to those already disqualified from the Commons, (Note: Officers of customs and excise had already been excluded from the Commons since the reign of William III.) Tories in the Commons added several other offices, including all created after 25 October 1705. (Note: Offices created after that date remained absolutely ineligible for the Commons – even with a by-election – as late as 1922 absent express exemption in the statute creating them.) This process led to a "characteristically illogical English compromise" between those supporting the Crown's ability to dispense patronage and those wishing to bolster the Commons' ability to check the Crown: starting from the Regency Act and continuing with the Succession to the Crown Act 1707, (Note: The relevant parts of the Regency Act were scheduled to commence after the dissolution of the existing parliament, which would not happen until 1708 and after union with Scotland. The Succession to the Crown Act, effective 1708 in the interim, repealed the Act and removed that requirement; at any rate dissolution occurred shortly after the Act's commencement.) those holding certain offices of profit under the Crown, including ministries, were required to vacate their seats in the Commons, but could maintain their offices if they were re-elected. Commissions in the Army or Navy were expressly exempt from either total disqualification or the requirement for by-election. The requirement to stand in a by-election only applied when an elected legislator was first appointed to a portfolio. Ministers already holding portfolios were not required to contest additional by-elections to remain ministers after being returned in a subsequent general election where their party formed government.

A minister typically sought re-election in the same constituency he had just vacated, but could contest another seat which was also vacant. It was not unusual for an MP representing a safe seat for the governing party to vacate his seat so that a minister might run in it. In the 18th century, it was rare for a new minister to be outright defeated in a by-election; between 1715 and 1754, only eight such occurrences happened between 393 by-elections, and only three defeats occurred from the 460 contests held between 1754 and 1790. The most common cause for a failure of re-election in this era was the ineligibility of the new minister to sit in the Commons, particularly by appointment to the Lords. Also more common than defeat was transferral to a new constituency or retirement. This was largely due to a convention against contesting ministerial by-elections, with breaches being noted in the press. In addition, constituencies of under 500 voters, at the time around 60 per cent of all constituencies, saw roughly 80 per cent of ministerial by-elections. This was because MPs from larger constituencies tended to be gentlemen shying away from government work, and because smaller constituencies were cheaper to manage a campaign.

During the first half of the 19th century, regular by-elections were seen as local affairs whereas ministerial by-elections were seen as a test of the government's record. As the century progressed, however, this distinction was lost and all by-elections were seen as the concern of national party apparatuses. Most constituencies in this era returned two MPs; the fact that by-elections – including ministerial by-elections – entailed the election of only one candidate and thus did not allow for voters to cross parties as in a general election was such that they were often called "single elections", and this intensified the partisan implications of by-elections. Even without ministerial vacancies, by-elections were so common in this era that few years had fewer than 20 or 30, and several had as many as 65. Ministerial by-elections were, however, 28.3 per cent of all by-elections in the period between 1833 and 1867, and 20.8 per cent between 1868 and 1914, and were the most common cause of by-elections in the middle of the 19th century, slightly leading de facto resignation and the deaths of incumbents.

By the mid-19th century, the solidification of responsible government made any fear of ministers being more loyal to the monarch than to Parliament purely academic. Despite this, ministerial by-elections were still justified as a way to hold a government accountable to the electorate. Contesting ministerial by-elections became more acceptable during this time, although convention remained to refrain from challenging a by-election that immediately followed a general election, instead waiting for the middle of the term when the government's mandate had worn down. In an era where parliaments could last as long as seven years, this was no trivial matter, and governments suffered 12 defeats in 54 contests between 1832 and 1868. Conservatives tended to have an easier time being re-elected than Whigs or their successors the Liberals. The large majority of ministerial by-elections, 86 per cent, were nevertheless uncontested between 1832 and 1886.

=== Reform and abolition ===
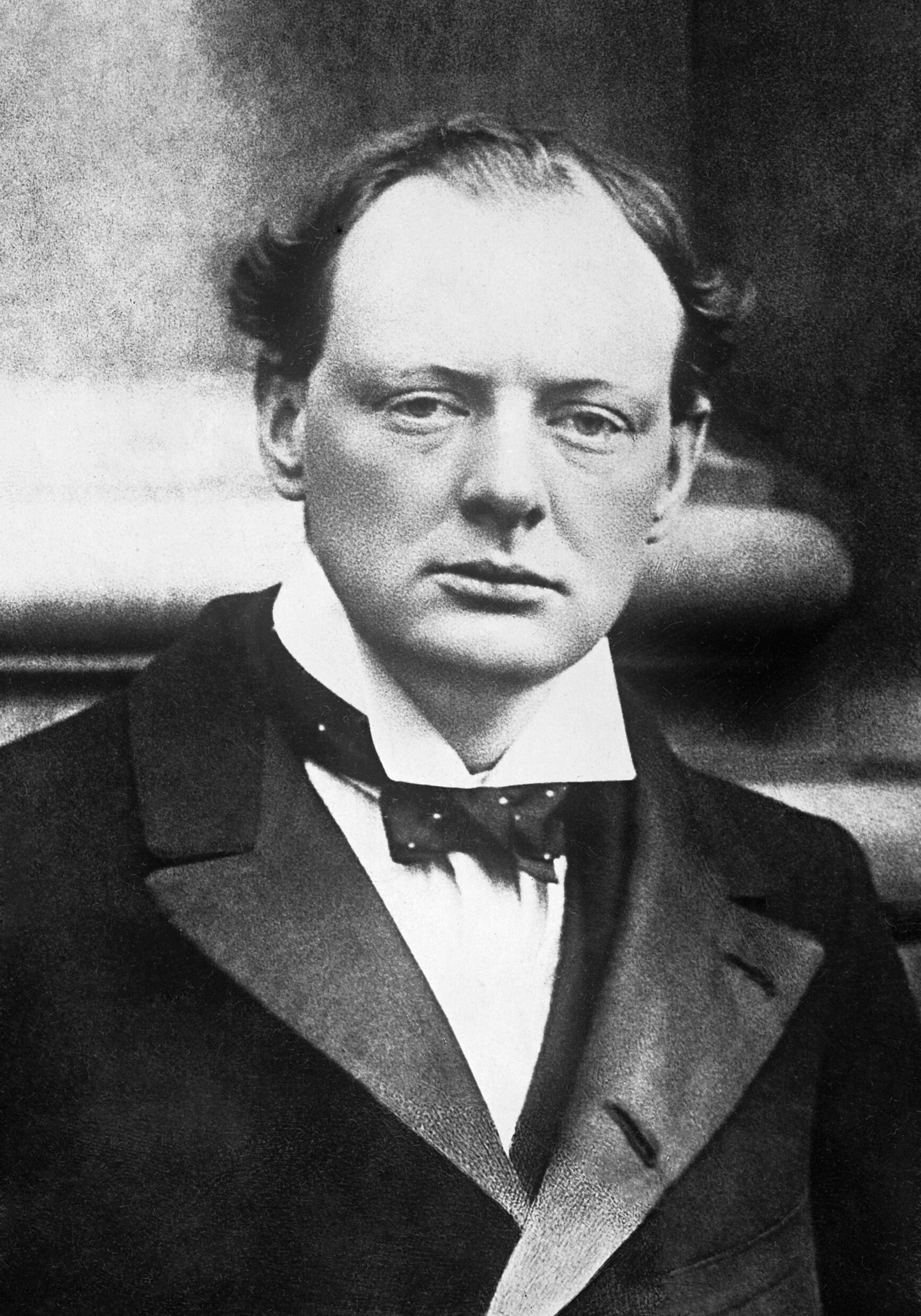
Winston Churchill lost the 1908 Manchester North West by-election

Governments began to resent these elections for several reasons. Apart from annoyance and expense of holding the election itself, they distracted ministers in the critical period after they assumed office, and could cause both a political wound and the loss of an able minister should he be defeated. They were also alleged to deter governments from appointing talented executives to the ministry if they represented marginal seats where a by-election could likely be lost, although it is dubious how much this was an issue in practice given the custom of finding safe seats for ministerial candidates. The Reform Act 1867, primarily concerned with expanding the franchise, also included a provision making cabinet reshuffles easier by abolishing the necessity to seek re-election for an existing minister taking a new portfolio. This particular provision was introduced by Benjamin Disraeli, and was agreed to by his rival William Ewart Gladstone and approved without division. The principle of ministerial by-elections was not however under attack, although Disraeli disputed the rationale of holding ministerial appointments publicly accountable.

Lord John Russell proposed eliminating ministerial by-elections as early as 1852. His son Lord Amberley proposed abolishing them in 1867, as did Viscount Bury in 1869. Amberley's and Bury's proposals were received negatively by backbenchers in the Commons, who condemned them as machinations to greatly change the constitution without public debate. With respect to the Amberley bill, James White asserted that such an election allowed a constituency to disallow its MP from serving national office and thereby abandoning it, whilst William Harcourt criticised the Bury bill for allowing ministries to form by personal connections without input from the electorate. Harcourt would reverse course when made the Home Secretary in 1880 and facing the resultant contest in Oxford, bemoaning that he was "to consider the question of a cheap and pure supply of water for the people of London ... But how am I to do so when I am kept here by the cheap distribution of more or less beer in Oxford?" Harcourt ultimately lost the election, but was returned unopposed in another for Derby.

Ministerial by-elections attracted little further attention until the Edwardian era, when the bitter politics of the time resulted in their prominence and led to their being referendums on both the government and various policies. In particular, many special interest groups such as the Tariff Reform League and the Women's Social and Political Union fiercely contested these elections to promote their causes. Despite incumbents once again appealing to chivalry and convention to shame opponents, by-election defeats became more common. Nevertheless, the elections remained largely accepted; Arthur Balfour approached the Prime Minister Henry Campbell-Bannerman to abolish them in 1905, but Campbell-Bannerman declined, and newspapers across the political spectrum acquiesced to the institution. An exception was The Times, which when detailing a by-election for Walthamstow in 1910 noted that the practice had begun in the reign of Queen Anne "to prevent the Court from swamping the House of Commons with placemen and pensioners" and described it as "anomalous" and "indefensible" for the 20th century.

A large reason for the elections' persistence was that, in spite of claims by the opposition and suffragettes that by-election losses reflected a failure of the government, many by-election defeats were quite narrow, and in any event a minister who lost a by-election usually won a second by-election in another constituency, as happened with Winston Churchill, who lost a by-election for Manchester North West upon his 1908 appointment as the President of the Board of Trade but soon won another for Dundee. Never concerned about his prospects of joining Parliament, after his loss Churchill boasted of having secured "eight or nine safe seats ... placed at my disposal." Occasionally, however, a newly appointed minister could fail to join Parliament and thus lose office altogether. Charles Masterman was appointed the chancellor of the Duchy of Lancaster in February 1914, but owing to the government's unpopularity lost first a February by-election for his own seat of Bethnal Green South West, then a second by-election for Ipswich in May; he was offered a third contest for Swansea in February 1915 but instead resigned and ended his ministerial career.

During the First World War, temporary acts in 1915 and 1916 were passed to suspend the requirement for re-election, in order to allow the War Cabinets of the Asquith coalition ministry and the Lloyd George ministry to be appointed quickly. Despite exuberance from the frontbench, Liberal and Irish Nationalist backbenchers, who felt betrayed by various actions of the ministry, attacked the acts' rationale and stated that the Commons was chronically underworked during the war. Opposition was sufficient to sink attempts for another moratorium in 1917, when Churchill had to run a by-election on becoming the minister of Munitions and successfully faced a challenger. Upon the return of peace, the Lloyd George ministry, which relied heavily on patronage, had its house leader, Bonar Law, table a bill that would become the Re-Election of Ministers Act 1919. Intending to abolish by-elections for seven ministers and allow up to three ministers without portfolio rather than one, the bill received no initial support outside of the government due to suspicion of Lloyd George. Since much of the opposition to the bill came from Conservatives, of whom Law was one, Law acquiesced and eventually formed a compromise with Liberals to abolish ministerial by-elections only in the first nine months after a general election.

The Lloyd George ministry collapsed in October 1922, a process accelerated by the rise of the Labour Party. In the ministry's final months, a by-election for Pontypridd in July had resulted in the loss of Thomas Arthur Lewis to a Labourite, the last time in British history a ministerial candidate would lose a by-election. Subsequent governments did not last long enough for the nine-month period to expire until 1925. In that year, the second Baldwin ministry fielded a candidate at a by-election for Bury St Edmunds in December and again for East Renfrewshire in January 1926, where Alexander MacRobert prevailed by 900 votes to remain the Solicitor General for Scotland. MacRobert had been criticised in that campaign for being too low-profile and relying on the government, and the Baldwin ministry was becoming fragile. A private member's bill was introduced by the Conservative backbencher Christopher Clayton shortly after the East Renfrewshire contest to abolish the ministerial by-elections altogether, which soon received the support of the government. Clayton asserted that the bill would simply continue the reforms of the 1919 act, while Baldwin reiterated previous arguments against such elections and noted that East Renfrewshire had gone through four elections in less than four years. Many MPs felt that not only was the remaining scope of ministerial by-elections small enough to not be worth retaining them, but also that enough by-elections occurred for other reasons to allow a gauge of public opinion on the government in between general elections. Although critics from Labour and the Liberals suggested that the bill be implemented at the next parliament rather than immediately, "by 1926 ... the fire had gone out of the debate" and the bill passed 143 votes to 74, being enacted as the Re-Election of Ministers Act (1919) Amendment Act 1926. Contrary to popular beliefs that Labour either advocated for or opposed the elections' abolition, Labour were constitutionally conservative in the 1920s and most Labour MPs abstained from voting on the 1926 bill; it was largely Conservatives who opposed the 1926 bill, 21 of them voting against it. Ministerial appointment had been the cause of 677 by-elections since the Reform Act 1832 out of a total of 3,770 between 1832 and 2011; ministerial by-elections were the third-most common cause of by-elections, after the death of incumbents and de facto resignation from the Commons.

The Times celebrated the abolition, declaring that "Queen Anne is Dead!" and asserting that ministerial by-elections were never an effective check on the executive even in the 18th century and had become even more antiquated with the shorter-lived parliaments provided by the Parliament Act 1911. Further study confirmed that ministerial by-elections were largely fruitless at constraining the executive in the 18th century.

== Canada ==
The first British colony to achieve responsible government was Nova Scotia, which received it on 8 January 1848; its House of Assembly did away with ministerial by-elections in 1927. The Legislative Assembly of New Brunswick abolished ministerial by-elections in 1927, as did that of Prince Edward Island in 1932.

The province of Canada was granted responsible government on 11 March 1848, and also adopted the practice of ministerial by-elections. Beginning in 1853 several offices were expressly exempted from the requirement for by-election, as were all officers who resigned office and took another within thirty days except for, prior to 1855, the Solicitor General becoming one of the province's two Attorneys General. Initially applying only to members of the province's Legislative Assembly, the requirement for by-election was extended to its Legislative Councillors in 1857. The politician John A. Macdonald used the by-election requirement, and in particular the thirty-day exemption period, to regain the joint premiership for Canada West from George Brown in 1858, and again from John Sandfield Macdonald (no relation) in 1864. In 1867, the province and two others federated to form the dominion of Canada; the province of Canada's institutions and legislation continued in those of the federal government of the dominion, whereas its provincial jurisdiction was split between the new provinces of Ontario (representing the anglophone Upper Canada) and Quebec (representing the francophone Lower Canada).

All three of these jurisdictions inherited ministerial by-elections. At the federal level, the province's 1857 legislation was re-enacted in 1867, although existing ministers were exempted from by-election when taking a new office in 1878. The King–Byng affair, a 1926 dispute between the Prime Minister William Lyon Mackenzie King and the Governor General Lord Byng concerning the latter's refusal to dissolve the House of Commons on the Liberal King's advice after a hung parliament, led to Conservative opposition leader Arthur Meighen heading the government after King's resignation. Meighen presided over a shaky minority government, so he advised Byng to appoint "acting ministers" to avoid the need for by-elections. This resulted in a censure of Meighen's government and its eventual downfall. Ministerial by-elections' role in the crisis figured in the British debate on their final abolition there. Despite questions as to why such a wasteful practice needed to occur immediately after a general election, and buoyed by a belief (Note: The Act is silent on this matter specifically, but its preamble binds Canada to a constitution "similar in principle to that of the United Kingdom", which has been the basis of substantive case law.) that they were required by the British North America Act 1867, federal by-elections continued until they were abolished by another Conservative government in 1931. Despite a proposal by Liberal frontbencher Ernest Lapointe to restrict abolition to a nine-month period after a general election similar to what had been British practice, the final legislation ended them altogether. The Legislative Assembly of Quebec abolished by-elections in 1927. The Legislative Assembly of Ontario attempted abolition in 1926 to follow Britain's proposed lead. This proposal, led by Attorney General William Folger Nickle, succeeded only in securing limited exemptions before final abolition occurred in 1941.

The Legislative Assembly of the North-West Territories used ministerial by-elections during the period of responsible government from 1897 to 1905; this period ended when the new provinces of Alberta and Saskatchewan were created from the most populous areas of the territories. Both provinces continued the practice of ministerial by-elections; the Legislative Assembly of Alberta abolished them in 1926, whereas that of Saskatchewan did so in 1936. British Columbia joined Canada in 1871; its Legislative Assembly ended ministerial by-elections in 1929 against a proposed amendment to limit abolition to a few months after a general election. Manitoba joined Canada in 1870, and its Legislative Assembly abolished ministerial by-elections in 1937.

Newfoundland began elections to its House of Assembly in 1832, was granted responsible government in 1854, and was made a dominion in 1907. It maintained ministerial by-elections until they were abolished in 1928, having already suspended them during the First World War. Dominion status would soon end due to shaky finances; a British-controlled Commission of Government was appointed in 1934 and remained in power until Newfoundland became a province of Canada in 1949.

== Australia ==
Most of the legislatures of the British colonies in Australia required ministerial by-elections at some point, though the federal House of Representatives created in 1901 and the South Australian House of Assembly created in 1857 never did. Queensland had the practice until it was abolished, probably accidentally, by the 1884 passage of the Officials in Parliament Act. The colony had previously undergone a financial crisis in 1866, and the governor appointed a new government solely to adopt a new budget, being sure to appoint only ministers without portfolio to circumvent the requirement. Van Diemen's Land, renamed Tasmania in 1856, received a constitution providing for by-elections, which proved fatal to the "Continuous Ministry" when Attorney General Richard Lucas lost his by-election in 1887. The colony implicitly abolished the practice when it adopted the Hare–Clark electoral system of proportionally-represented multi-member constituencies in 1896, and explicitly in 1905.

In New South Wales, the 1855 constitution provided for by-elections in the Legislative Assembly but expressly exempted the major offices of Colonial Secretary, Treasurer, Auditor General, Attorney General, and Solicitor General, allowed up to five other offices to be exempted, and allowed existing officeholders to accept another office without a by-election. Despite convention dictating that newly appointed ministers not be generally contested, two premiers – Stuart Donaldson and James Martin – lost by-elections in 1856 and 1863 but ultimately won by-elections in other seats; other ministers occasionally lost by-elections but usually won in other seats. George Reid's seat in the Legislative Assembly was contested on an unrelated technicality in 1884, and the resultant constitutional amendment to clarify the issue led to a movement to abolish ministerial by-elections. Several bills were introduced to that effect, but all were defeated until ministerial by-elections were finally abolished in 1906 as part of widespread electoral reform.

Victoria had ministerial by-elections, which were formalities by the end of the 19th century. Nevertheless, the resignation and election process took time, resulting in ministers' not sitting in the Legislative Assembly. George Elmslie became premier in December 1913 owing to a split in the Liberal Party that allowed his Laborites to form a government. Before the month was out, however, the Liberals reconciled and toppled the Elmslie government, with Elmslie viewing the events from the public gallery. Elmslie and his ministers were all returned in their by-elections after the government had fallen. These events led to the abolition of the practice being tabled in 1914, approved without debate in both the Legislative Assembly and Legislative Council, and granted royal assent in 1915.

Despite having a few ministerial positions specially exempted from by-election in its 1890 constitution, Western Australia was unusual in having a tradition of contesting the elections that did occur. Alfred Morgans defeated the government of George Leake in November 1901; Leake avenged this loss by campaigning against Morgans's ministerial candidates, defeating them in the by-elections and causing Morgans's government to fall, allowing Leake's resumption of the premiership. Ten more contests occurred between then and 1908, and a further four from 1908 to 1917, ending with John Scaddan's defeat as punishment for defecting from Labor during the conscription crisis. By-elections were once again formalities until 1938, when Alexander Panton was appointed minister for health and was challenged in the resultant by-election. Winning the contest, Panton would be the last Australian minister whose by-election was contested. Western Australia amended its constitution to abolish by-elections in 1947, becoming the last jurisdiction in the British Empire to do so.

== Other countries ==
Ireland was a part of the United Kingdom between 1801 and 1922. By-elections contested in Irish constituencies were typically, but not always, caused by appointments to Ireland-specific offices such as the Solicitor-General for Ireland, although such offices could also be held by MPs contesting British constituencies. The Government of Ireland Act 1920 created two home rule parliaments for Ireland, one for Northern Ireland and the other for Southern Ireland, and did not list a by-election for its requirements of ministers, only that a minister enter his respective parliament within six months of appointment. The Parliament of Southern Ireland never achieved widespread legitimacy in any event, being outcompeted by the Dáil Éireann in the Irish War of Independence; the constitution of the Irish Free State that arose from the war expressly abolished ministerial by-elections, stating that "[t]he appointment of a member of Dáil Éireann to be a Minister shall not entail upon him any obligation to resign his seat or to submit himself for re-election".

The Union of South Africa, created in 1910, and New Zealand, granted dominion status in 1907, never had by-elections for new ministers. Southern Rhodesia was granted self-government in 1923 by letters patent that explicitly eliminated ministerial by-elections on terms similar to that of the Irish Free State. The Government of India Act 1935 exempted central and provincial ministers, or those serving a princely state on behalf of the Crown, from by-election.

=== Non-Westminster systems ===
Many political systems prohibit a dual mandate in both executive and legislative office, and would thus provide for a vacancy in a legislative seat upon appointment to the executive. If such vacancies are filled by holding by-elections, then these countries can technically be said to also have "ministerial by-elections"; quite unlike the old British practice, however, the new minister cannot enter such a by-election while retaining executive office. In American politics, and those of countries with presidential systems inspired by it, members of the executive cannot also be legislators per the custom of separation of powers; by that same logic, members of the executive are not responsible to the legislature and do not need its confidence to retain (Note: Many such systems require legislative confirmation of executive appointments, but this is irrevocable and does not constitute a continuing subordination of such appointments to the legislature.) office – executive governments are generally elected in these systems, so they have a mandate independent from that of the legislature. In the US, members of Congress are barred from being appointed to an office that was created or had its compensation increased during their term; in practice, the Saxbe fix is used to appoint legislators to a salary-increased position by rolling the salary back to what it was at the beginning of the relevant term. In any event, the vacancies created by executive appointment are filled by by-elections pursuant to the laws of the legislator's state. For senators in particular, a state's governor may appoint a temporary successor until a by-election is held; the Seventeenth Amendment, which made the Senate directly elected rather than selected by state legislatures, gives states the option to limit or abolish gubernatorial appointment. As of 2024, only Kentucky, North Dakota, Wisconsin, and Rhode Island outright deny their governors the ability to appoint temporary senators, and the large majority of the remaining states provide no restrictions on the practice.

Dualistic parliamentary systems combine the responsible executive of Westminster systems like those in the British Empire and its successor, the Commonwealth of Nations, with the American system of disallowing simultaneous holding of executive and legislative office. In such systems, the appointment of a sitting MP to an executive position triggers a vacancy in Parliament. The Netherlands is a country with a dualistic system, but it has increased the fusion between parliament and the government since the 1970s and in any event uses candidate-based party-list proportional representation for its parliament.

== See also ==
- Norwegian Law (Israel)
- Dual mandate

== Sources ==
- Andeweg, Rudy B. (1 July 2004). "Parliamentary Democracy in the Netherlands". Parliamentary Affairs. 57 (3). Oxford University Press: 568–580. doi:10.1093/pa/gsh045.
- Anson, William R. (February 1922). Gwyer, Maurice L. (ed.). The Law and Custom of the Constitution. Vol. 1 (5th ed.). Oxford: Clarendon Press – via Internet Archive.
- Beaven, Alfred B. (1911). "List of opposed elections on taking office". English Historical Review. 26 (101). Longmans, Green: 139–148. doi:10.1093/ehr/XXVI.CI.139.
- Cannon, John; Speck, W. A. (1978). "Re-election on Taking Office, 1706–90". Historical Research. 51 (124): 206–209. doi:10.1111/j.1468-2281.1978.tb01883.x. ISSN 0950-3471.
- Gwyn, Richard (2007). John A., The Man Who Made Us: The Life and Times of Sir John A. Macdonald. Vol. 1: 1815–1867. Toronto: Random House Canada. ISBN 978-0-679-31475-2 – via Internet Archive.
- Hawkins, Angus (2013). "Government Appointment By-Elections: 1832–1886". In Otte, T.G.; Readman, Paul (eds.). By-Elections in British Politics, 1832–1914. Boydell. ISBN 978-1843837800 – via Google Books.
- Isaacs, Victor (Autumn 2005). "The Case of the Missing Premier — A Strange Parliamentary Practice" (PDF). Australian Parliamentary Review. 20 (1): 34–53. Archived from the original (PDF) on 12 March 2015.
- McInnis, Edgar (1947). Canada: A Political and Social History. New York and Toronto: Rinehart and Company, Inc. – via Internet Archive.
- Pugh, Martin (2002). "'Queen Anne is dead': The Abolition of Ministerial By-Elections, 1867–1926". Parliamentary History. 21 (3): 351–366. doi:10.1111/j.1750-0206.2002.tb00238.x. ISSN 0264-2824.
- Swainson, Donald (1989). Sir John A. Macdonald: The Man and the Politician. Kingston and New York: Quarry Press. ISBN 0-919627-29-3 – via Internet Archive.
- The Constitution of the United States of America: As Amended (PDF). Washington: United States Government Printing Office.
