= Bourbonnais (disambiguation) =

Bourbonnais is a historic province in the centre of France.

Bourbonnais or Bourbonnaise, may also refer to:

== Animals ==
- Bourbonnaise (chicken), a French breed of chicken
- Bourbonnais Donkey, a breed of donkey
- Bourbonnais Grey, a French breed of rabbit
- Bourbonnais horse, a French breed of draft horse closely related to the Percheron
- Braque du Bourbonnais, a French breed of gundog

== Language ==
- Bourbonnais dialects, spoken in the Bourbonnais region
- Bourbonnais Creole, French-based creoles spoken in the western Indian Ocean

== People ==
- Augustin Bourbonnais (1850-1923), Canadian medic and politician
- Avila-Gonzague Bourbonnais (1859-1902), Canadian civil servant and politician
- Claude Bourbonnais (born 1965), Canadian race car driver
- Jaime Bourbonnais (born 1998), Canadian ice hockey player
- Marie-Claude Bourbonnais (born 1979), Canadian cosplayer and glamour model
- Rick Bourbonnais (born 1955), Canadian ice hockey player
- Roger Bourbonnais (born 1942), Canadian ice hockey player

== Places ==
- A79 autoroute ("La Bourbonnaise"), an expressway in central France
- Bourbonnais route, a canal route in central France
- Bocage bourbonnais (French: Borbounnais hedgerow), a natural region in Bourbonnais, Alliers, France
- Bourbonnais, Illinois, USA; a village in Bourbonnais Township, Kankakee County
  - Bourbonnais Township, Kankakee County, Illinois
- Bourbonais, Illinois, USA; a former settlement in Bureau County

== Other uses ==
- HMS Bourbonnaise (1809), a Napoleonic-era British Royal Navy frigate

== See also ==
- Boulonnais (disambiguation)
- Bourbon (disambiguation)
