= 5th Canadian Parliament =

1883–87 national legislative term

- Majority parliament
- Feb. 8, 1883 – Jan. 15, 1887

Parliament leaders
- Prime minister: Rt. Hon. Sir John A. Macdonald; Oct. 17, 1878 – Jun. 6, 1891
- Cabinet: 3rd Canadian Ministry
- Leader of the Opposition: Edward Blake; 4 May 1880 – 2 June 1887

Party caucuses
- Government: Conservative Party & Liberal-Conservative
- Opposition: Liberal Party

House of Commons
- Seating arrangements of the House of Commons
- Speaker of the Commons: Joseph-Goderic Blanchet; 13 February 1879 – 7 February 1883
- George Airey Kirkpatrick; 8 February 1883 – 12 July 1887
- Members: 242 seats MP seats List of members

Senate
- Speaker of the Senate: The Hon. Sir David Lewis Macpherson; 19 April 1880 – 16 October 1883
- The Hon. William Miller; 17 October 1883 – 3 April 1887
- Government Senate leader: Alexander Campbell; 18 October 1878 – 26 January 1887
- Opposition Senate leader: Sir Richard William Scott; 8 October 1878 – 27 April 1896
- Senators: 97 seats senator seats List of senators

Sovereign
- Monarch: Victoria; 1 July 1867 – 22 Jan. 1901
- Governor general: The Duke of Argyll; 25 Nov. 1878 – 23 Oct. 1883
- The Marquess of Lansdowne; 23 Oct. 1883 – 11 June 1888

Sessions
- 1st session 8 February 1883 – 27 May 1883
- 2nd session 17 January 1884 – 19 April 1884
- 3rd session 29 January 1885 – 20 July 1885
- 4th session 25 February 1886 – 2 June 1886
← 4th	→ 6th

The 5th Canadian Parliament was in session from 8 February 1883, until 15 January 1887 (3 years and 341 days). The membership was set by the 1882 federal election on 20 June 1882. It was dissolved prior to the 1887 election. The 5th Canadian Parliament was controlled by a Conservative/Liberal-Conservative majority under Prime Minister Sir John A. Macdonald and the 3rd Canadian Ministry. The Official Opposition was the Liberal Party, led by Edward Blake.

The Speaker was George Airey Kirkpatrick. See also List of Canadian electoral districts 1882-1887 for a list of the ridings in this parliament.

There were four sessions of the 5th Parliament:

Session	Start	End
1st	February 8, 1883	May 27, 1883
2nd	January 17, 1884	April 19, 1884
3rd	January 29, 1885	July 20, 1885
4th	February 25, 1886	June 2, 1886

== Notable legislation ==
This term was notable for passing the Chinese Immigration Act of 1885 which imposed a head tax on Chinese immigrants to Canada.

== List of members ==
Following is a full list of members of the fifth Parliament listed first by province, then by electoral district.

Key:

- Party leaders are italicized.
- Cabinet ministers are in **boldface**.
- The Prime Minister is **both**.
- The Speaker is indicated by "(†)".

Electoral districts denoted by an asterisk (*) indicates that district was represented by two members.

=== British Columbia ===
Electoral district	Name	Party	First elected/previously elected	No. of terms
Cariboo	James Reid	Liberal-Conservative	1881	2nd term
New Westminster	Joshua Homer	Liberal-Conservative	1882	2nd term
Vancouver	David William Gordon	Liberal-Conservative	1882	1st term
Victoria*	Edgar Crow Baker	Conservative	1882	1st term
Victoria*	Noah Shakespeare	Conservative	1882	1st term
Yale	Francis Jones Barnard	Conservative	1879	2nd term

=== Manitoba ===
Electoral district	Name	Party	First elected/previously elected	No. of terms
Lisgar	Arthur Wellington Ross	Liberal-Conservative	1882	1st term
Marquette	Robert Watson	Liberal	1882	1st term
Provencher	Joseph Royal	Conservative	1879	2nd term
Selkirk	Hugh McKay Sutherland	Liberal	1882	1st term
Winnipeg	Thomas Scott	Conservative	1880	2nd term

=== New Brunswick ===
Electoral district	Name	Party	First elected/previously elected	No. of terms
Albert	John Wallace (unseated 1883)	Liberal	1867, 1882	4th term*
Albert	John Wallace (by-election of 1883-07-10)	Liberal-Conservative	1883	1st term
Carleton	David Irvine	Liberal	1881	2nd term
Charlotte	Arthur Hill Gillmor	Liberal	1874	3rd term
City and County of St. John*	Isaac Burpee (died 1 March 1885)	Liberal	1872	4th term
City and County of St. John*	Charles Wesley Weldon	Liberal	1878	2nd term
City and County of St. John*	Charles Arthur Everett (by-election of 1885-10-20)	Conservative	1885	1st term
City of St. John	**Samuel Leonard Tilley** (appointed New Brunswick's Lieutenant-Governor 12 November 1885)	Liberal-Conservative	1873, 1878	3rd term*
City of St. John	Frederick Eustace Barker (by-election of 1885-11-24)	Conservative	1885	1st term
Gloucester	Kennedy Francis Burns	Conservative	1882	1st term
Kent	Gilbert Anselme Girouard	Liberal-Conservative	1878	2nd term
Kent	Pierre Amand Landry (by-election of 1883-09-22)	Conservative	1883	1st term
King's	**George Eulas Foster** (election voided 1882)	Conservative	1882	1st term
King's	**George Eulas Foster** (by-election of 1882-11-07, until Ministerial appointment)	Conservative	1882	1st term
King's	**George Eulas Foster** (by-election of 1885-12-31)	Conservative	1882	1st term
Northumberland	Peter Mitchell	Independent	1872, 1882	3rd term*
Queen's	George Gerald King	Liberal	1878	2nd term
Restigouche	Robert Moffat	Conservative	1882	1st term
Sunbury	Charles Burpee	Liberal	1867	5th term
Victoria	**John Costigan**	Liberal-Conservative	1867	5th term
Westmorland	Josiah Wood	Conservative	1882	1st term
York	John Pickard	Independent Liberal	1868	5th term
York	Thomas Temple (by-election of 1884-06-29)	Conservative	1884	1st term

=== Nova Scotia ===
Electoral district	Name	Party	First elected/previously elected	No. of terms
Annapolis	William Hallett Ray	Liberal	1867, 1882	4th term*
Antigonish	Angus McIsaac	Liberal	1874	3rd term
Antigonish	**John Thompson** (by-election of 1885-10-16)	Liberal-Conservative	1885	1st term
Cape Breton*	Murray Dodd	Conservative	1882	1st term
Cape Breton*	William McDonald (until 1884 Senate appointment)	Conservative	1872	4th term
Cape Breton*	Hector Francis McDougall (by-election of 1884-07-03)	Liberal-Conservative	1884	1st term
Colchester	**Archibald McLelan**	Conservative	1867, 1881	3nd term*
Cumberland	**Charles Tupper** (until 1884 High Commission appointment)	Conservative	1867	5th term
Cumberland	Charles James Townshend (by-election of 1884-06-26)	Liberal-Conservative	1884	1st term
Digby	William Berrian Vail	Liberal	1874, 1882	2nd term*
Guysborough	John Angus Kirk	Liberal	1874, 1882	2nd term*
Halifax*	Malachy Bowes Daly	Liberal-Conservative	1878	2nd term
Halifax*	Matthew Henry Richey (until 1883 Lieutenant-Governor appointment)	Liberal-Conservative	1878	2nd term
Halifax*	John Fitzwilliam Stairs (by-election of 1883-07-24)	Conservative	1883	1st term
Hants	William Henry Allison	Conservative	1878	2nd term
Inverness	Hugh Cameron	Liberal-Conservative	1867, 1882	2nd term*
Kings	Douglas Benjamin Woodworth	Liberal-Conservative	1874	3rd term
Lunenburg	Thomas Twining Keefler (until 1883 voiding of election)	Liberal	1882	1st term
Lunenburg	Charles Edwin Kaulbach (by-election of 1883-10-10)	Conservative	1883	1st term
Pictou*	John McDougald	Liberal-Conservative	1881	2nd term
Pictou*	Charles Hibbert Tupper	Conservative	1882	1st term
Queens	James Fraser Forbes	Liberal	1867, 1882	4th term*
Richmond	Henry Nicholas Paint	Conservative	1882	1st term
Shelburne	Thomas Robertson	Liberal	1878	2nd term
Victoria	Charles James Campbell	Conservative	1874, 1882	2nd term*
Yarmouth	Joseph Robbins Kinney	Liberal	1882	1st term

=== Ontario ===
Electoral district	Name	Party	First elected/previously elected	No. of terms
Addington	John William Bell	Conservative	1882	1st term
Algoma	Simon James Dawson	Conservative	1878	2nd term
Bothwell	John Joseph Hawkins (until 1884 voiding of election)	Liberal-Conservative	1882	1st term
Bothwell	David Mills (by-election of 1884-02-25)	Liberal	1884	1st term
Brant North	James Somerville	Liberal	1882	1st term
Brant South	William Paterson	Liberal	1872	4th term
Brockville	John Fisher Wood	Liberal-Conservative	1882	1st term
Bruce East	Rupert Mearse Wells	Liberal	1882	1st term
Bruce North	Alexander McNeill	Liberal-Conservative	1882	1st term
Bruce West	James Somerville	Liberal	1882	1st term
Cardwell	**Thomas White** (until 1885 ministerial nomination)	Conservative	1878	2nd term
Cardwell	**Thomas White** (by-election of 1885-08-27)	Conservative	1878	2nd term
Carleton	**John A. Macdonald**	Liberal-Conservative	1867	5th term
Cornwall and Stormont	Darby Bergin	Liberal-Conservative	1872, 1878	3rd term*
Dundas	Charles Erastus Hickey	Conservative	1882	1st term
Durham East	Arthur Trefusis Heneage Williams (died 4 July 1885)	Conservative	1878	2nd term
Durham East	Henry Alfred Ward (by-election of 1885-08-24)	Conservative	1885	1st term
Durham West	Edward Blake	Liberal	1879	2nd term
Elgin East	John Henry Wilson	Liberal	1882	1st term
Elgin West	George Elliott Casey	Liberal	1872	4th term
Essex North	James Colebrooke Patterson	Conservative	1878	2nd term
Essex South	Lewis Wigle	Conservative	1882	1st term
Frontenac	George Airey Kirkpatrick (†)	Conservative	1870	5th term
Glengarry	Donald Macmaster	Conservative	1882	1st term
Grenville South	William Thomas Benson (died 8 June 1885)	Conservative	1882	1st term
Grenville South	Walter Shanly (by-election of 1885-07-04)	Conservative	1885	1st term
Grey East	Thomas Simpson Sproule	Conservative	1878	2nd term
Grey North	Benjamin Allen	Liberal	1882	1st term
Grey South	George Landerkin	Liberal	1872, 1882	3rd term*
Haldimand	David Thompson (died 18 April 1886)	Liberal	1867	5th term
Haldimand	Charles Wesley Colter (by-election of 1886-09-08)	Liberal	1886	1st term
Halton	William McCraney	Liberal	1875, 1882	2nd term*
Hamilton	Francis Edwin Kilvert	Conservative	1878	2nd term
Hamilton	Thomas Robertson	Liberal	1878	2nd term
Hastings East	John White	Conservative	1871	5th term
Hastings North	**Mackenzie Bowell**	Conservative	1867	5th term
Hastings West	Alexander Robertson	Conservative	1882	1st term
Huron East	Thomas Farrow	Conservative	1878	2nd term
Huron South	John McMillan (resigned 1883)	Liberal	1882	1st term
Huron South	Richard John Cartwright (by-election of 1883-12-10)	Liberal	1883	1st term
Huron West	Malcolm Colin Cameron	Liberal	1867, 1878	5th term*
Kent	Henry Smyth (until election voided 31 December 1883)	Conservative	1882	1st term
Kent	Henry Smyth (by-election of 1884-01-29)	Conservative	1882	1st term
Kingston	Alexander Gunn	Liberal	1878	2nd term
Lambton East	John Henry Fairbank	Liberal	1882	1st term
Lambton West	James Frederick Lister	Liberal	1882	1st term
Lanark North	Joseph Jamieson	Conservative	1882	1st term
Lanark South	John Graham Haggart	Conservative	1872	4th term
Leeds North and Grenville North	Charles Frederick Ferguson	Liberal-Conservative	1874	3rd term
Leeds South	George Taylor	Conservative	1882	1st term
Lennox	**John A. Macdonald** (until election voided)	Liberal-Conservative	1867	5th term
Lennox	David Wright Allison (by-election of 1883-11-26, until election voided)	Liberal	1883	1st term
Lennox	Matthew William Pruyn (by-election of 1885-01-28)	Conservative	1885	1st term
Lincoln and Niagara	John Charles Rykert	Conservative	1878	2nd term
London	**John Carling**	Liberal-Conservative	1867, 1878	4th term*
Middlesex East	Duncan Macmillan	Liberal-Conservative	1875	3rd term
Middlesex North	Timothy Coughlin	Liberal-Conservative	1878	2nd term
Middlesex South	James Armstrong	Liberal	1882	1st term
Middlesex West	George William Ross (until election voided October 1883)	Liberal	1872	4th term
Middlesex West	Donald Mackenzie Cameron (by-election of 1883-12-14)	Liberal	1883	1st term
Monck	Lachlan McCallum	Liberal-Conservative	1874	3rd term
Muskoka and Parry Sound	William Edward O'Brien	Conservative	1882	1st term
Norfolk North	John Charlton	Liberal	1872	4th term
Norfolk South	Joseph Jackson	Liberal	1882	1st term
Northumberland East	Edward Cochrane	Conservative	1882	1st term
Northumberland West	George Guillet (unseated 1885)	Conservative	1881	2nd term
Northumberland West	George Guillet (by-election of 1885-04-07)	Conservative	1885	1st term
Ontario North	Alexander Peter Cockburn	Liberal	1878	2nd term
Ontario South	Francis Wayland Glen	Liberal	1878	2nd term
Ontario West	George Wheler (resigned 1884)	Liberal	1878	2nd term
Ontario West	James David Edgar (by-election of 1884-08-22)	Liberal	1884	1st term
Ottawa (City of)*	Charles Herbert Mackintosh	Conservative	1882	1st term
Ottawa (City of)*	Joseph Tassé	Conservative	1878	2nd term
Oxford North	James Sutherland	Liberal	1880	2nd term
Oxford South	Archibald Harley	Liberal	1882	1st term
Peel	James Fleming	Liberal	1882	1st term
Perth North	Samuel Rollin Hesson	Conservative	1878	2nd term
Perth South	James Trow	Liberal	1872	4th term
Peterborough East	John Burnham	Conservative	1878	2nd term
Peterborough West	George Hilliard	Liberal-Conservative	1878	2nd term
Prescott	Simon Labrosse	Liberal	1882	1st term
Prince Edward	John Milton Platt	Liberal	1882	1st term
Renfrew North	Peter White	Conservative	1876	3rd term
Renfrew South	Robert Campbell	Liberal	1882	1st term
Russell	Moss Kent Dickinson	Conservative	1882	1st term
Simcoe East	Hermon Henry Cook	Liberal	1874, 1882	2nd term*
Simcoe North	Dalton McCarthy	Conservative	1872	4th term
Simcoe South	Richard Tyrwhitt	Conservative	1882	2nd term
Toronto Centre	Robert Hay	Liberal	1878	2nd term
Toronto East	John Small	Conservative	1882	1st term
Victoria North	Hector Cameron	Conservative	1875	3rd term
Victoria South	Joseph Rutherford Dundas	Conservative	1882	1st term
Waterloo North	Hugo Kranz	Conservative	1878	2nd term
Waterloo South	James Livingston	Liberal	1882	1st term
Welland	John Ferguson	Conservative	1878	2nd term
Wellington Centre	George Turner Orton	Liberal-Conservative	1874	3rd term
Wellington North	James McMullen	Liberal	1882	1st term
Wellington South	James Innes	Liberal	1882	1st term
Wentworth North	Thomas Bain	Liberal	1872	4th term
Wentworth South	Lewis Springer	Liberal	1882	1st term
West Toronto	James Beaty	Conservative	1880	2nd term
York East	Alexander Mackenzie	Liberal	1867	5th term
York North	William Mulock	Liberal	1882	1st term
York West	Nathaniel Clarke Wallace	Conservative	1878	2nd term

=== Prince Edward Island ===
Electoral district	Name	Party	First elected/previously elected	No. of terms
King's County*	Peter Adolphus McIntyre	Liberal	1874, 1882	2nd term*
King's County*	James Edwin Robertson (until disqualified from office)	Liberal	1882	1st term
King's County*	Augustine Colin Macdonald (by-election of 1883-04-26)	Liberal-Conservative	1873, 1878, 1883	3rd term*
Prince County*	Edward Hackett	Liberal-Conservative	1878	2nd term
Prince County*	James Yeo	Liberal	1873	4th term
Queen's County*	Louis Henry Davies	Liberal	1882	1st term
Queen's County*	John Theophilus Jenkins (until election voided)	Liberal-Conservative	1882	1st term
Queen's County*	Frederick de Sainte-Croix Brecken (by-election of 1883-02-27, until postmaster appointment)	Conservative	1883	1st term
Queen's County*	John Theophilus Jenkins (by-election of 1884-08-19)	Liberal-Conservative	1882, 1884	2nd term*

=== Quebec ===
Electoral district	Name	Party	First elected/previously elected	No. of terms
Argenteuil	John Abbott	Liberal-Conservative	1867, 1880	5th term*
Bagot	Joseph Alfred Mousseau (until Quebec cabinet appointment)	Conservative	1874	3rd term
Bagot	Flavien Dupont (by-election of 1882-09-02)	Conservative	1882	1st term
Beauce	Joseph Bolduc (until Senate appointment)	Conservative	1876	3rd term
Beauce	Thomas Linière Taschereau (by-election of 1884-10-31)	Conservative	1884	1st term
Beauharnois	Joseph Gédéon Horace Bergeron	Conservative	1879	2nd term
Bellechasse	Guillaume Amyot	Conservative	1881	2nd term
Berthier	Edward Octavian Cuthbert	Conservative	1875	3rd term
Bonaventure	Louis Joseph Riopel	Conservative	1882	1st term
Brome	Sydney Arthur Fisher	Liberal	1882	1st term
Chambly	Pierre Basile Benoit (until Chambly Canal appointment)	Conservative	1876	3rd term
Chambly	Raymond Préfontaine (by-election of 1886-07-30)	Liberal	1886	1st term
Champlain	Hippolyte Montplaisir	Liberal-Conservative	1874	3rd term
Charlevoix	Simon-Xavier Cimon	Conservative	1881	2nd term
Chicoutimi—Saguenay	Jean Alfred Gagné	Conservative	1882	1st term
Châteauguay	Edward Holton	Liberal	1880	2nd term
Compton	**John Henry Pope**	Liberal-Conservative	1867	5th term
Dorchester	Charles Alexander Lesage	Conservative	1882	1st term
Drummond—Arthabaska	Désiré Olivier Bourbeau	Conservative	1877	3rd term
Gaspé	Pierre Fortin	Conservative	1867, 1878	4th term*
Hochelaga	Alphonse Desjardins	Conservative	1874	3rd term
Huntingdon	Julius Scriver	Liberal	1869	5th term
Iberville	François Béchard	Liberal	1867	5th term
Jacques Cartier	Désiré Girouard	Conservative	1878	2nd term
Joliette	Édouard Guilbault (until election voided 4 November 1882)	Conservative	1882	1st term
Joliette	Édouard Guilbault (by-election of 1882-12-07)	Independent Conservative	1882	1st term
Kamouraska	Charles Bruno Blondeau	Conservative	1882	1st term
Laprairie	Alfred Pinsonneault	Conservative	1867	5th term
L'Assomption	Hilaire Hurteau	Liberal-Conservative	1874	3rd term
Laval	Joseph-Aldric Ouimet	Liberal-Conservative	1873	4th term
Lévis	Joseph-Goderic Blanchet (until Customs appointment) (†)	Liberal-Conservative	1867, 1878	4th term*
Lévis	Isidore-Noël Belleau (by-election of 1883-10-25, until unseated by court)	Conservative	1883	1st term
Lévis	Pierre Malcom Guay (by-election of 1885-04-14)	Liberal	1885	1st term
L'Islet	Philippe Baby Casgrain	Liberal	1872	4th term
Lotbinière	Côme Isaïe Rinfret	Liberal	1878	2nd term
Maskinongé	Frédéric Houde (died 15 November 1884)	Nationalist Conservative	1878	2nd term
Maskinongé	Alexis Lesieur Desaulniers (by-election of 1884-12-22)	Conservative	1884	1st term
Mégantic	Louis-Israël Côté alias Fréchette (until election voided 1 April 1884)	Conservative	1882	1st term
Mégantic	François Charles Stanislas Langelier (by-election of 1884-06-10)	Liberal	1884	1st term
Missisquoi	George Barnard Baker	Liberal-Conservative	1878	2nd term
Montcalm	Firmin Dugas	Conservative	1871	5th term
Montmagny	Auguste Charles Philippe Robert Landry	Conservative	1878	2nd term
Montmorency	Pierre Vincent Valin	Conservative	1878, 1880	2nd term*
Montreal Centre	John Joseph Curran	Conservative	1882	1st term
Montreal East	Charles-Joseph Coursol	Conservative	1878	2nd term
Montreal West	Matthew Hamilton Gault	Conservative	1878	2nd term
Napierville	Médéric Catudal	Liberal	1882	1st term
Nicolet	François Xavier Ovide Méthot (until Quebec legislative council appointment 27 March 1884)	Independent Conservative	1877	3rd term
Nicolet	Athanase Gaudet (by-election of 1884-04-16)	Nationalist Conservative	1884	1st term
Ottawa (County of)	Alonzo Wright	Liberal-Conservative	1867	5th term
Pontiac	John Bryson	Conservative	1882	1st term
Portneuf	Joseph Esdras Alfred de Saint-Georges	Liberal	1872, 1882	3rd term*
Quebec-Centre	Joseph Guillaume Bossé	Conservative	1882	1st term
Quebec County	**Adolphe-Philippe Caron**	Conservative	1873	4th term
Quebec East	Wilfrid Laurier	Liberal	1874	3rd term
Quebec West	Thomas McGreevy	Liberal-Conservative	1867	5th term
Richelieu	Louis Huet Massue	Liberal-Conservative	1878	2nd term
Richmond—Wolfe	William Bullock Ives	Conservative	1878	2nd term
Rimouski	Louis Adolphe Billy	Conservative	1882	1st term
Rouville	Georges Auguste Gigault	Conservative	1878	2nd term
Saint Maurice	Louis-Léon Lesieur Desaulniers	Conservative	1867, 1878	3rd term*
Shefford	Michel Auger	Independent Liberal	1882	1st term
Town of Sherbrooke	Robert Newton Hall	Liberal-Conservative	1882	1st term
Soulanges	Jacques Philippe Lantier (died 15 September 1882)	Conservative	1872	4th term
Soulanges	Georges-Raoul-Léotale-Guichart-Humbert Saveuse de Beaujeu (by-election of 1882-10-27, until unseated 11 December 1883)	Conservative	1882	1st term
Soulanges	James William Bain (by-election of 1883-12-27, until election voided)	Conservative	1883	1st term
Soulanges	James William Bain (by-election of 1885-02-05)	Conservative	1882	1st term
Stanstead	Charles Carroll Colby	Liberal-Conservative	1867	5th term
St. Hyacinthe	Michel Esdras Bernier	Liberal	1882	1st term
St. John's	François Bourassa	Liberal	1867	5th term
Terrebonne	Guillaume-Alphonse Nantel (resigned to open seat for Chapleau)	Conservative	1882	1st term
Terrebonne	**Joseph-Adolphe Chapleau** (by-election of 1882-08-16)	Conservative	1882	1st term
Three Rivers	**Hector-Louis Langevin**	Conservative	1867, (Note: Dorchester) 1876, (Note: Charlevoix) 1878	5th term*
Témiscouata	Paul Étienne Grandbois	Conservative	1878	2nd term
Two Mountains	Jean-Baptiste Daoust	Conservative	1876	3rd term
Vaudreuil	Hugh McMillan	Conservative	1882	1st term
Verchères	Félix Geoffrion	Liberal	1867	5th term
Yamaska	Fabien Vanasse	Conservative	1879	2nd term

== By-elections ==
By-election	Date	Incumbent	Party	Winner	Party	Cause	Retained
Haldimand	September 8, 1886	David Thompson	Liberal	Charles Wesley Colter	Liberal	Death	Yes
Chambly	July 30, 1886	Pierre Basile Benoit	Conservative	Raymond Préfontaine	Liberal	Appointed Superintendent of the Chambly Canal.	No
King's	December 31, 1885	George Eulas Foster	Conservative	George Eulas Foster	Conservative	Recontested upon appointment as Minister of Marine and Fisheries.	Yes
City of St. John	November 24, 1885	Samuel Leonard Tilley	Liberal-Conservative	Frederick Eustace Barker	Conservative	Appointed Lieutenant-Governor of New Brunswick.	Yes
City and County of St. John	October 20, 1885	Isaac Burpee	Liberal	Charles Arthur Everett	Conservative	Death	No
Antigonish	October 16, 1885	Angus McIsaac	Liberal	John Sparrow David Thompson	Liberal-Conservative	Appointed County Court Judge for District No. 6.	No
Cardwell	August 27, 1885	Thomas White	Conservative	Thomas White	Conservative	Recontested upon appointment as Minister of the Interior.	Yes
Durham East	August 24, 1885	Arthur Trefusis Heneage Williams	Conservative	Henry Alfred Ward	Conservative	Death	Yes
Grenville South	July 4, 1885	William Thomas Benson	Conservative	Walter Shanly	Conservative	Death	Yes
Lévis	April 14, 1885	Isidore-Noël Belleau	Conservative	Pierre Malcom Guay	Liberal	Unseated on a judgement of the Supreme Court.	Yes
Northumberland West	April 7, 1885	George Guillet	Conservative	George Guillet	Conservative	Election declared void	Yes
Soulanges	February 5, 1885	James William Bain	Conservative	James William Bain	Conservative	Election declared void.	Yes
Lennox	January 28, 1885	David Wright Allison	Liberal	Matthew William Pruyn	Conservative	Election declared void.	No
Maskinongé	December 22, 1884	Frédéric Houde	Nationalist Conservative	Alexis Lesieur Desaulniers	Conservative	Death.	No
Beauce	October 31, 1884	Joseph Bolduc	Nationalist Conservative	Thomas Linière Taschereau	Conservative	Called to the Senate.	Yes
Ontario West	August 22, 1884	George Wheler	Liberal	James David Edgar	Liberal	Resignation	Yes
Queen's County	August 19, 1884	Frederick de Sainte-Croix Brecken	Conservative	John Theophilus Jenkins	Liberal-Conservative	Appointed Postmaster of Charlottetown.	Yes
Cape Breton	July 3, 1884	William McDonald	Conservative	Hector Francis McDougall	Liberal-Conservative	Called to the Senate.	Yes
York	June 29, 1884	John Pickard	Independent Liberal	Thomas Temple	Conservative	Death	No
Cumberland	June 26, 1884	Charles Tupper	Conservative	Charles James Townshend	Liberal-Conservative	Appointed High Commissioner for Canada in the United Kingdom.	Yes
Mégantic	June 10, 1884	Louis-Israël Côté dit Fréchette	Conservative	François Langelier	Liberal	Election declared void.	No
Nicolet	April 16, 1884	François-Xavier-Ovide Méthot	Independent Conservative	Athanase Gaudet	Nationalist Conservative	Appointed to the Legislative Council of Quebec.	No
Bothwell	February 25, 1884	John Joseph Hawkins	Liberal-Conservative	David Mills	Liberal	Election declared void.	No
Kent	January 29, 1884	Henry Smyth	Conservative	Henry Smyth	Conservative	Election declared void.	Yes
Soulanges	December 27, 1883	Georges-Raoul-Léotale-Guichart-Humbert Saveuse de Beaujeu	Conservative	James William Bain	Conservative	Election declared void.	Yes
Middlesex West	December 14, 1883	George William Ross	Liberal	Donald Mackenzie Cameron	Liberal	Election declared void.	Yes
Huron South	December 10, 1883	John McMillan	Liberal	Richard John Cartwright	Liberal	Resignation to provide a seat for Cartwright.	Yes
Lennox	November 26, 1883	John A. Macdonald	Liberal-Conservative	David Wright Allison	Liberal	Election voided. Macdonald was concurrently elected in Carleton and chose to sit for that riding.	No
Lévis	October 25, 1883	Joseph-Godéric Blanchet	Liberal-Conservative	Isidore-Noël Belleau	Conservative	Appointed Collector of Customs for the Port of Quebec.	Yes
Lunenburg	October 10, 1883	Thomas Twining Keefler	Liberal	Charles Edwin Kaulbach	Conservative	Election declared void.	No
Kent	September 22, 1883	Gilbert Anselme Girouard	Conservative	Pierre-Amand Landry	Conservative	Appointed customs collector for Richibucto.	Yes
Halifax	July 24, 1883	Matthew Henry Richey	Liberal-Conservative	John Fitzwilliam Stairs	Conservative	Appointed Lieutenant Governor of Nova Scotia.	Yes
Albert	July 10, 1883	John Wallace	Liberal	John Wallace	Liberal-Conservative	Election declared void.	No
King's County	April 26, 1883	James Edwin Robertson	Liberal	Augustine Colin Macdonald	Liberal-Conservative	Robertson disqualified as he was a member of the Prince Edward Island Legislative Assembly at the time of the election. The seat was adjudicated to MacDonald.	No
Queen's County	February 27, 1883	John Theophilus Jenkins	Liberal-Conservative	Frederick de Sainte-Croix Brecken	Conservative	Jenkins' election being declared void, the seat was adjudicated to Mr. Brecken.	Yes
Joliette	December 7, 1882	Édouard Guilbault	Conservative	Édouard Guilbault	Independent Conservative	Election declared void.	No
King's	November 7, 1882	George Eulas Foster	Conservative	George Eulas Foster	Conservative	Election declared void.	Yes
Soulanges	October 27, 1882	Jacques Philippe Lantier	Conservative	Georges-Raoul-Léotale-Guichart-Humbert Saveuse de Beaujeu	Conservative	Death	Yes
Bagot	September 2, 1882	Joseph-Alfred Mousseau	Conservative	Flavien Dupont	Conservative	Resignation upon appointment as Premier of Quebec.	Yes
Terrebonne	August 16, 1882	Guillaume-Alphonse Nantel	Conservative	Joseph-Adolphe Chapleau	Conservative	Resignation to provide a seat for Chapleau.	Yes
