= Omer Dostaler =

Canadian politician (1849–1925)

Member of the Legislative Assembly of Quebec for Berthier
- In office January 1890 – June 1890
- Preceded by: Louis Sylvestre
- Succeeded by: Cuthbert-Alphonse Chênevert

Personal details
- Born: November 19, 1849 Sainte-Geneviève-de-Berthier, Canada East
- Died: December 3, 1925 (aged 76) Sainte-Geneviève-de-Berthier, Quebec
- Party: Liberal

Omer Dostaler (November 19, 1849 – December 3, 1925) was a farmer and political figure in Quebec. He represented Berthier in the Legislative Assembly of Quebec in 1890 as a Liberal.

He was born in Sainte-Geneviève-de-Berthier, Canada East, the son of Pierre-Eustache Dostaler and Geneviève Mousseau, who was the daughter of Alexis Mousseau. Dostaler was educated in Berthierville. He operated the family farm, which he inherited on his father's death in 1884. In 1877, he married Sophie-Marie Desrosiers. He was elected to the Quebec assembly in an 1890 by-election held after Louis Sylvestre was named to the Quebec legislative council; Dostaler did not run for reelection in the 1890 general election. He died in Sainte-Geneviève-de-Berthier at the age of 77.

His cousins Joseph-Alfred Mousseau and Joseph-Octave Mousseau both served in the Canadian House of Commons.
