= Richard Chapman Weldon =

Canadian politician

Richard C. Weldon MP
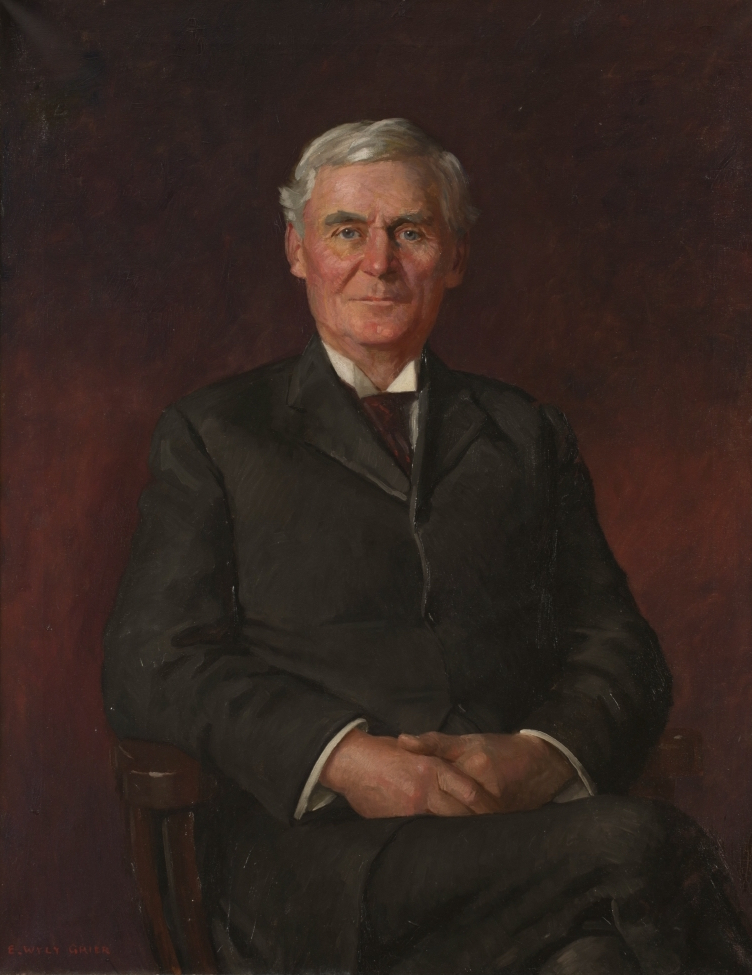

Member of Parliament for Albert
- In office February 22, 1887 – June 23, 1896
- Preceded by: John Wallace
- Succeeded by: William James Lewis

1st Dean of Dalhousie Law School
- In office 1883–1914
- Succeeded by: Donald Alexander MacRae

Personal details
- Born: January 19, 1849 Sussex, New Brunswick
- Died: November 26, 1925 (aged 76) Dartmouth, Nova Scotia
- Party: Conservative
- Spouse: Sarah Maria Tuttle
- Profession: Attorney, Professor, Politician

Richard Chapman Weldon (January 19, 1849 – November 26, 1925) was a Canadian professor, lawyer and political figure in Nova Scotia and New Brunswick. He represented Albert in the House of Commons of Canada from 1887 to 1896 as a Conservative member.

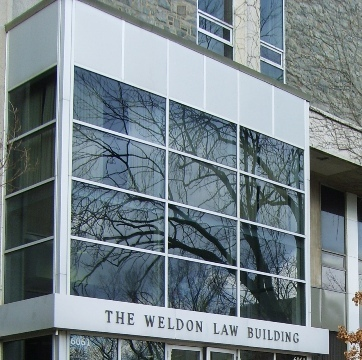
The Weldon Law Building at Dalhousie University was named for Richard Chapman Weldon, first Dean of the law school there.

== Early life and education ==
He was born in Sussex, New Brunswick, the son of Richard Chapman Weldon and Catherine Geldart. He was educated at Mount Allison Wesleyan College and taught school for two years. Weldon returned to Mount Allison, receiving an M.A. in economics. He went on to study at Yale College, where he received a PhD in political science in 1872, and Rupert Charles University in Germany.

== Career ==
In 1875, he returned to Mount Allison as professor of mathematics and political economy. In 1883, he became professor of law at Dalhousie University, where he established the Dalhousie Law School. In 1884, he was called to the Nova Scotia bar. In 1887, Weldon, who owned property in New Brunswick, was elected to the House of Commons. Weldon married Louisa Frances Hare in 1893 after the death of his first wife. He helped developed legislation which established conditions for extradition of American fugitives in Canada convicted of crimes in the United States, then referred to as the Weldon Act. Weldon was unsuccessful in bids for reelection in 1896, 1900 and 1906.

== Death ==
On November 26, 1925, he died in Dartmouth, Nova Scotia at the age of 76.

== Personal life ==
On July 11, 1877, he married Sarah Maria Tuttle and they remained married until her death in 1892. He then married Louisa Frances Hare on December 28, 1893. His grandson, Richard L. Weldon, was a provincial politician and lawyer.

== Awards ==
Dalhousie Law School established the Weldon Award in 1983 to recognize outstanding accomplishment by a graduate.

== Electoral record ==
1887 Canadian federal election: Albert
Party	Candidate	Votes	%	±%
Conservative	Richard Chapman Weldon	1,047	53.15	-0.25
Liberal	Alexander Rogers	923	46.85	+0.25
Total valid votes		1,970	–	
Source: Library of Parliament

1891 Canadian federal election: Albert
Party	Candidate	Votes	%	±%
Conservative	Richard Chapman Weldon	1,096	51.80	-1.35
Liberal	Henry Emmerson	1,020	48.20	+1.35
Total valid votes		2,116	–	
Source: Library of Parliament

1896 Canadian federal election: Albert
Party	Candidate	Votes	%	±%
Independent	William James Lewis	1,170	55.79	–
Conservative	Richard Chapman Weldon	927	44.21	-7.59
Total valid votes		2,097	–	
Source: Library of Parliament
