= Dominique-Amable Coutlée =

Canadian politician

Member of the Legislative Assembly of Quebec for Soulanges
- In office 1867–1871
- Succeeded by: Georges-Raoul-Léotale-Guichart-Humbert Saveuse de Beaujeu

Personal details
- Born: December 24, 1822 Saint-Joseph-de-Soulanges (Les Cèdres), Lower Canada
- Died: April 10, 1882 (aged 59) Montreal, Quebec
- Party: Conservative

Dominique-Amable Coutlée (December 24, 1822 – April 10, 1882) was a merchant, farmer and political figure in Quebec. He represented Soulanges in the Legislative Assembly of the Province of Canada from 1858 to 1861 and in the Legislative Assembly of Quebec from 1867 to 1871 as a Conservative.

He was born in Saint-Joseph-de-Soulanges, Lower Canada, the son of Louis-Pierre Coutlée and Marie-Rose Watier. Coutlée was mayor of Saint-Joseph-de-Soulanges from 1864 to 1871 and lieutenant-colonel in the militia for Soulanges County. In 1844, he married Marie-Henriette Chenier. He was defeated when he ran for reelection in 1861 and again in 1871. He died in Montreal at the age of 59.
