= Pierre-Eustache Dostaler =

Canadian politician (1809–1884)

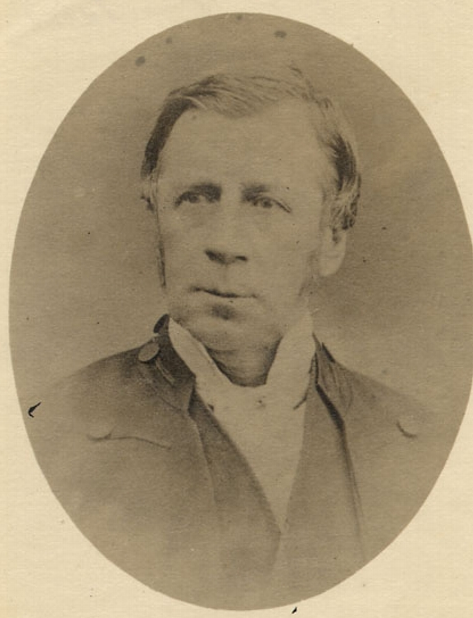

Member of the Legislative Council of Quebec for De Lanaudière
- In office November 2, 1867 – January 4, 1884
- Succeeded by: Louis-Rodrigue Masson

Personal details
- Born: May 15, 1809 Berthier (Berthierville), Lower Canada
- Died: January 14, 1884 (aged 74) Berthier (Berthierville), Quebec
- Party: Conservative

Pierre-Eustache Dostaler (May 15, 1809 – January 14, 1884) was a political figure in Quebec. He represented Berthier in the Legislative Assembly of the Province of Canada from 1854 to 1858 and from 1861 to 1863.

He was born Pierre-Amable Cazobon in Berthier, Lower Canada, the son of Eustache Cazobon (Cazobon Dostaler) and Geneviève Cottenoir dit Préville. Dostaler was president of the agricultural society for Berthier County and a member of the Quebec Chamber of Agriculture. He was also justice of the peace and a captain in the militia. In 1832, he married Geneviève, the daughter of Alexis Mousseau. He ran unsuccessfully for a seat in the legislative assembly in 1851. Dostaler was defeated when he ran for reelection in 1858 and in 1863. In 1867, he was named to the Legislative Council of Quebec for Lanaudière division. He died in office in Berthier at the age of 74.

His son Omer served in the Quebec assembly. His nephews Joseph-Alfred Mousseau and Joseph-Octave Mousseau both served in the Canadian House of Commons.
