= Joseph Mousseau =

Joseph Mousseau may refer to:

- Joseph Octave Mousseau (1844–1898), physician and political figure in Quebec
- Joseph-Alfred Mousseau (1837–1886), French Canadian politician
