= Pointe-des-Cascades =

- Village municipality
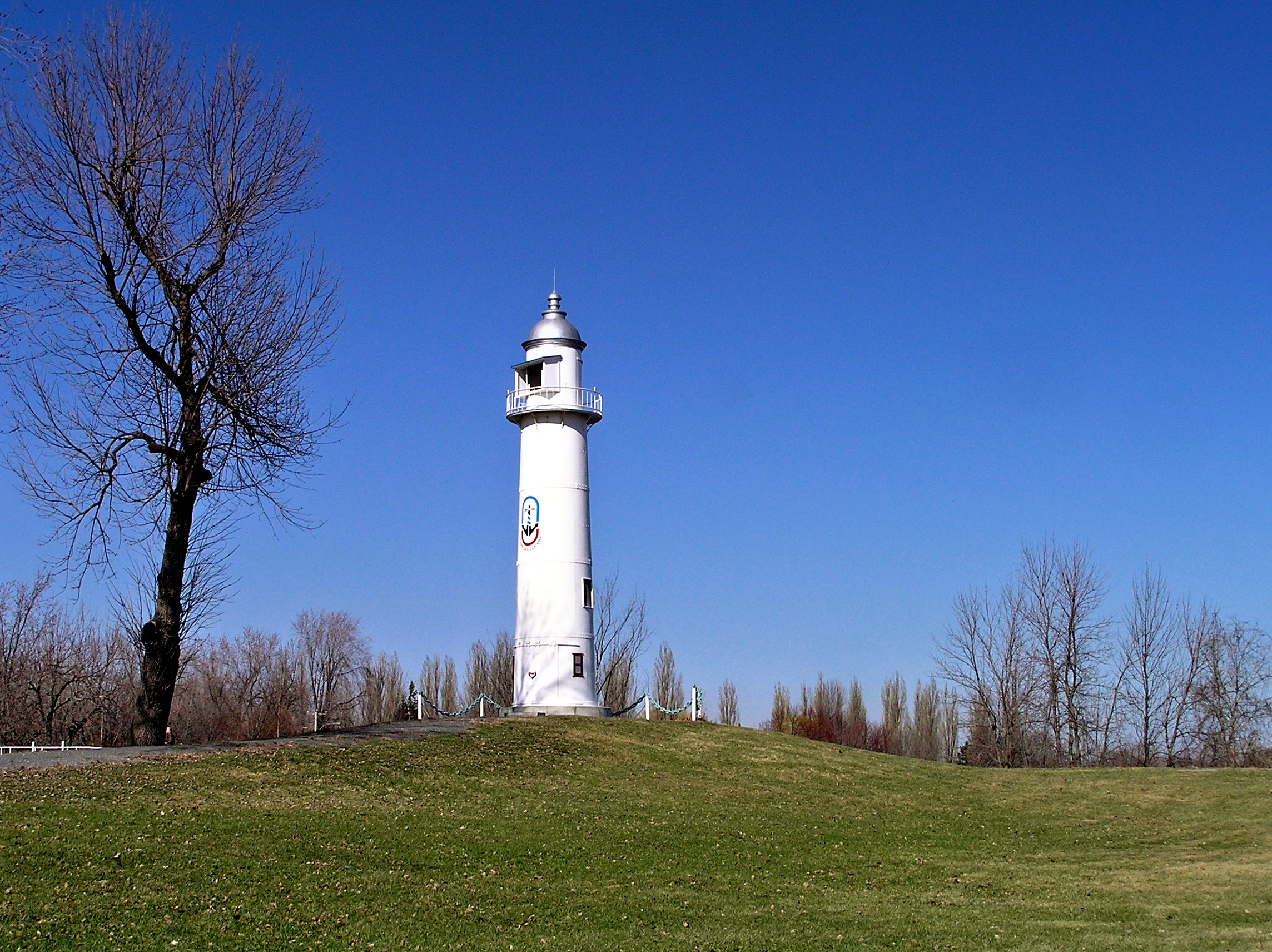
- Parc des Ancres Lighthouse

- Coat of arms

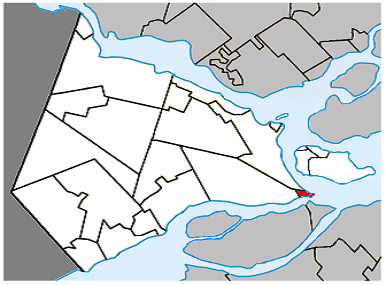
- Location within Vaudreuil-Soulanges RCM

- Location in southern Quebec
- Coordinates: 45°20′N 73°58′W
- Country: Canada
- Province: Quebec
- Region: Montérégie
- RCM: Vaudreuil-Soulanges
- Constituted: May 1, 1961

Government
  - Mayor: Peter Zytynsky
  - Federal riding: Beauharnois—Salaberry—Soulanges—Huntingdon
  - Prov. riding: Soulanges

Area
  - Total: 9.98 km^{2} (3.85 sq mi)
  - Land: 2.74 km^{2} (1.06 sq mi)

Population (2021)
  - Total: 1,775
  - Density: 646.8/km^{2} (1,675/sq mi)
  - Pop 2016-2021: ▲19.9%
  - Dwellings: 762
- Time zone: UTC−5 (EST)
  - Summer (DST): UTC−4 (EDT)
- Postal code(s): J0P 1M0
- Area codes: 450 and 579
- Highways: R-338
- Website: www.pointe-des-cascades.com

Pointe-des-Cascades (French pronunciation: [pwɛ̃t de kaskad]) is a village municipality in Vaudreuil-Soulanges Regional County Municipality in the Montérégie region of Quebec, Canada. It is located on a spit of land where the St. Lawrence River flows into Lake Saint-Louis. The river has here a significant drop, forming several cascades which give the village its name. The islands of Île des Cascades and Île des Joybert are connected by a narrow causeway, but Île des Cascades and Pointe-des-Cascades are only connected artificially.

== History ==
Starting in the mid-seventeenth century until 1700, many military expeditions arrived at this place in order to portage around the cascades on the Saint Lawrence River. The first reference to Pointe-des-Cascades appeared in a text of Louis-Armand de Lahontan in 1684 and on a map of Deshayes in 1695, when Pointe des Cascades was included in the Vaudreuil Lordship.

In 1893, the post office opened under the English name Cascades Point (renamed in 1951 to Pointe-des-Cascades). A few years later construction began on the Soulanges Canal and when it was completed in 1899, the village became the eastern, downstream terminus of the canal. In 1958, it closed when it was superseded by the new Beauharnois Canal. The paths along the canal are now used as a regional cycling route.

In 1961, the Village Municipality of Pointe-des-Cascades was formed on the territory of the Parish Municipalities of Saint-Joseph-de-Soulanges (now Les Cèdres) and Saint-Michel-de-Vaudreuil (now part of Vaudreuil-Dorion).

== Demographics ==
Historical Census data - Pointe-des-Cascades, Quebec

Year	Pop.	±%
1976	726	—
1981	692	−4.7%
1986	641	−7.4%
1991	691	+7.8%
1996	910	+31.7%

Year	Pop.	±%
2001	913	+0.3%
2006	1,046	+14.6%
2011	1,340	+28.1%
2016	1,481	+10.5%
2021	1,775	+19.9%

Source: Statistics Canada

In the 2021 Census of Population conducted by Statistics Canada, Pointe-des-Cascades had a population of 1,775 living in 743 of its 762 total private dwellings, a change of 19.9% from its 2016 population of 1,481. With a land area of 2.74 km^{2} (1.06 sq mi), it had a population density of 647.8/km^{2} (1,677.8/sq mi) in 2021.

Canada census – Pointe-des-Cascades community profile

	2021	2016	2011
Population	1,775 (+19.9% from 2016)	1,481 (10.5% from 2011)	1,340 (+28.1% from 2006)
Land area	2.74 km^{2} (1.06 sq mi)	2.68 km^{2} (1.03 sq mi)	2.67 km^{2} (1.03 sq mi)
Population density	646.8/km^{2} (1,675/sq mi)	553.1/km^{2} (1,433/sq mi)	502.2/km^{2} (1,301/sq mi)
Median age	37.2 (M: 38.0, F: 37.2)	39.7 (M: 39.2, F: 40.2)	40.9 (M: 41.1, F: 40.7)
Private dwellings	762 (total)	672 (total)	600 (total)
Median household income	$88,000	$68,045	$55,754

References: 2021 2016 2011

Canada Census mother tongue - Pointe-des-Cascades, Quebec
Census	Total	French			English			French & English			Other		
Year	responses	Count	Trend	Pop %	Count	Trend	Pop %	Count	Trend	Pop %	Count	Trend	Pop %
2021	1,775	1,335	▲8.1%	75.2%	230	▲58.6%	13.0%	55	▲175.0%	3.1%	145	▲81.3%	8.2%
2016	1,480	1,235	▲4.7%	83.4%	145	▲45.0%	9.8%	20	▼20.0%	1.4%	80	▲128.6%	5.4%
2011	1,340	1,180	▲19.8%	88.1%	100	▲185.7%	7.5%	25	▲ n/a%	1.9%	35	▲133.3%	2.6%
2006	1,035	985	▲13.2%	95.2%	35	▼22.2%	3.4%	0	0.0%	0.0%	15	▲ n/a%	1.5%
2001	915	870	▼2.2%	95.1%	45	▲350.0%	4.9%	0	▼100.0%	0.0%	0	▼100.0%	0.0%
1996	920	890	n/a	96.7%	10	n/a	1.1%	10	n/a	1.1%	10	n/a	1.1%

== Local government ==
Pointe-des-Cascades federal election results
Year	Liberal		Conservative		Bloc Québécois		New Democratic		Green	
2021	32%	273	18%	154	36%	300	9%	79	2%	14
2019	38%	349	6%	56	38%	350	10%	88	6%	53

Pointe-des-Cascades provincial election results
Year	CAQ		Liberal		QC solidaire		Parti Québécois	
2018	48%	447	21%	200	15%	140	12%	108
2014	0%	0	39%	294	13%	101	42%	322

Pointe-des-Cascades forms part of the federal electoral district of Salaberry—Suroît and has been represented by Claude DeBellefeuille of the Bloc Québécois since 2019. Provincially, Pointe-des-Cascades is part of the Soulanges electoral district and is represented by Marilyne Picard of the Coalition Avenir Québec since 2018.

List of former mayors:

- Joseph-Pierre-Amable Clément (1961–1968, 1971–1979)
- Joseph-Bruno-Germain Vallée (1968–1971)
- Joseph-Thomas-Ronald-Maurice Hayes (1979–2005)
- Francis Masse (2005–2007)
- Jean-Pierre Dupont (2007–2008)
- Maryse Morin Sauvé (2008–2013)
- Gilles Santerre (2013–2020)
- Pierre Lalonde (interim 2020)
- Peter Zytynsky (2021–present)

== Education ==
Commission Scolaire des Trois-Lacs operates Francophone schools.

Lester B. Pearson School Board operates Anglophone schools. It is zoned to Birchwood Elementary School in Saint-Lazare and St. Patrick Elementary School in Pincourt.

== See also ==
- List of anglophone communities in Quebec
- List of village municipalities in Quebec
