= William James Lewis =

Canadian politician (1830–1910)

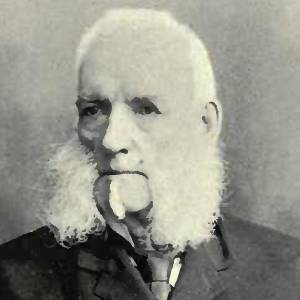
William James Lewis

William James Lewis (September 23, 1830 – June 22, 1910) was a physician and political figure in New Brunswick, Canada. He represented Albert County in the Legislative Assembly of New Brunswick from 1879 to 1896 and Albert in the House of Commons of Canada from 1896 to 1904 as an independent and then Liberal member.

He was born in Hillsborough, New Brunswick, the son of John Lewis, who served in the province's assembly and Legislative Council, and Lavinia Taylor. He was educated there and at Sackville, then went on to study medicine at the University of Glasgow. He served as coroner for Albert County and was also a school trustee. He practised medicine in Hillsborough. He was married twice: to Melissa Steeves in 1877 and to Catherine Duffy in 1885. Lewis was a member of the province's Executive Council from 1882 to 1883. He died in Saint John at the age of 79.

== Electoral record ==
1896 Canadian federal election: Albert
Party	Candidate	Votes	%	±%
Independent	William James Lewis	1,170	55.79	–
Conservative	Richard Chapman Weldon	927	44.21	-7.59
Total valid votes		2,097	–	
Source: Library of Parliament

1900 Canadian federal election: Albert
Party	Candidate	Votes	%	±%
Liberal	William James Lewis	1,276	52.38	-3.41
Conservative	Richard Chapman Weldon	1,160	47.62	+3.41
Total valid votes		2,436	–	
Source: Library of Parliament
