= Joseph-Arthur Lortie =

Canadian politician

Member of the Canadian Parliament for Soulanges
- In office 1908–1911
- Preceded by: Augustin Bourbonnais
- Succeeded by: Wilfrid Laurier

Member of the Legislative Assembly of Quebec for Soulanges
- In office 1923–1927
- Preceded by: Avila Farand
- Succeeded by: Avila Farand

Personal details
- Born: January 2, 1869 Ste-Justine de Newton, Quebec
- Died: February 15, 1958 (aged 89) Coteau-du-Lac, Quebec
- Party: Conservative

Joseph-Arthur Lortie (January 2, 1869 – February 15, 1958) was a physician and political figure in Quebec. He represented Soulanges in the House of Commons of Canada from 1908 to 1911 and Soulanges in the Legislative Assembly of Quebec from 1923 to 1927 as a Conservative.

He was born in Sainte-Justine-de-Newton, Quebec, the son of Joseph Lortie and Marie-Julienne Montpetit, and was educated at the Collège Bourget and the Université Laval. He received his qualifications as a doctor in 1895 and set up practice in St-Polycarpe. In 1900, he married Marie-Anna Gladu. Lortie served on the municipal council of St-Polycarpe from 1908 to 1909. He was defeated when he ran for reelection to the House of Commons in 1911 and to the Quebec assembly in 1927. Lortie died at Coteau-du-Lac at the age of 89.
