= Joseph Robillard =

Canadian politician (1838–1905)

Member of the Legislative Assembly of Quebec for Berthier
- In office 1878–1886
- Preceded by: Louis Sylvestre
- Succeeded by: Louis Sylvestre

Personal details
- Born: January 14, 1838 Saint-Joseph-de-Lanoraie, Lower Canada
- Died: October 13, 1905 (aged 67) Montreal, Quebec
- Party: Conservative

Joseph Robillard (January 14, 1838 – October 13, 1905) was a farmer, navigator, merchant and political figure in Quebec. He represented Berthier in the Legislative Assembly of Quebec from 1878 to 1886 as a Conservative.

He was born in Saint-Joseph-de-Lanoraie, Lower Canada, the son of Maurice Robillard and Marguerite Hilaire, dit Bonaventure, and was educated there. Robillard became a navigator, then a farmer and merchant dealing in grain and hay at Saint-Joseph-de-Lanoraie then Montreal. He was a member of the Montreal Board of Trade. In 1873, Robillard married Annie de Lorimier. He was first elected to the Quebec assembly in 1878; his election in 1880 was appealed but he won the subsequent by-election. He was defeated by Louis Sylvestre when he ran for reelection in 1886. Robillard died in Montréal and was buried in the Notre Dame des Neiges Cemetery in 1905; his body was later moved to a cemetery in Saint-Joseph-de-Lanoraie in 1912.

He was the uncle of Joseph-Israël Tarte who was also a member of the Quebec assembly.
