= Olivier Bertin-Mahieux =

Olivier Bertin-Mahieux MNA

Member of the National Assembly for Soulanges
- Incumbent
- Assumed office October 5, 2026
- Preceded by: Marilyne Picard

Personal details
- Party: Liberal

Olivier Bertin-Mahieux is a Canadian politician who is a candidate for the National Assembly of Quebec for Soulanges in the 2026 Quebec general election as a member of the Quebec Liberal Party.

== Electoral record ==
2026 Quebec general election: Soulanges
** Preliminary results — Not yet official **
Party	Candidate	Votes	%	±%
Liberal	Olivier Bertin-Mahieux	14,174	35.51	
Parti Québécois	Francis Deroo	10,124	25.36	
Conservative	Kristian Solarik	7,067	17.70	
Coalition Avenir Québec	Marilyne Picard	5,527	13.85	
Québec solidaire	Florian Martin	2,406	6.03	
Canadian	Joseph Cianflone	485	1.21	
Démocratie directe	Jules Briand	136	0.34	
Total valid votes				
Total rejected ballots				
Turnout			68.61	
Electors on the lists			–	–
Liberal gain from Coalition Avenir Québec		Swing		+
Source: Élections Québec
