= Luc-Hyacinthe Masson =

Canadian politician

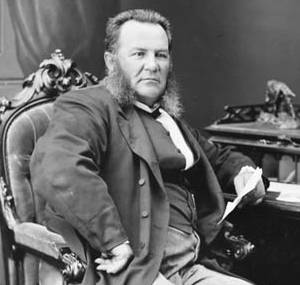

Member of the Canadian Parliament for Soulanges
- In office 1867–1872
- Succeeded by: Jacques Philippe Lantier

Personal details
- Born: August 16, 1811 St-Benoît, Lower Canada
- Died: October 18, 1880 (aged 69) Saint-Anicet, Quebec
- Party: Conservative

Luc-Hyacinthe Masson (August 16, 1811 – October 18, 1880) was a medical doctor, biusnessman and politician from Quebec. He represented Soulanges in the 1st Canadian Parliament as a Conservative member.

He was born in Saint-Benoît, Lower Canada in 1811, studied at the Petit Séminaire de Montréal and went on to study medicine with Doctor Robert Nelson. He helped fight the Asiatic cholera epidemic of 1832 and qualified as a doctor the following year. He practised at Saint-Clément-de-Beauharnois and then Saint-Benoit. Masson took part in the Lower Canada Rebellion and was exiled to the Bermudas in 1838. He returned to New York state in 1838 and returned to Canada East in 1842. Masson opened a business with his brother at Saint-Anicet. In 1844, he was named customs collector at Dundee. He served as mayor of Coteau-Landing and represented Soulanges in the Legislative Assembly of the Province of Canada from 1854 to 1857. After he retired from politics in 1872, he served as registrar for Soulanges County and clerk for the circuit court.

He died at Coteau-Landing in 1880.
