= Alexis Mousseau =

Canadian politician

Alexis Mousseau (December 5, 1767 – January 28, 1848) was a farmer and political figure in Lower Canada. He represented Warwick from 1820 to 1824 and from 1827 to 1830 and Berthier from 1830 to 1838 in the Legislative Assembly of Lower Canada.

He was born in Berthier, Lower Canada, the son of Jean-Baptiste Mousseau and Marie-Catherine Laferrière. In 1793, he married Marie-Anne Piette. Mousseau served as a captain in the militia. He generally supported the Parti patriote and voted in support of the Ninety-Two Resolutions. Mousseau died in Berthier at the age of 80.

His daughter Geneviève married Pierre-Eustache Dostaler. His grandson Omer Dostaler served in the provincial assembly and his grandsons Joseph-Alfred Mousseau and Joseph Octave Mousseau were members of the Canadian House of Commons.
