= Albert (federal electoral district) =

Former federal electoral district in New Brunswick, Canada

New Brunswick electoral district

Defunct federal electoral district
- Legislature: House of Commons
- District created: 1867
- District abolished: 1903
- First contested: 1867
- Last contested: 1900

Demographics
- Census division: Albert

Albert was a federal electoral district in New Brunswick, Canada, that was represented in the House of Commons of Canada from 1867 to 1904.

The district was proclaimed in the British North America Act 1867, based on the borders of Albert County. The district was abolished in 1903 when it was merged into King's and Albert riding. It consisted of the County of Albert.

== Members of Parliament ==
This riding elected the following members of Parliament:

Albert
Parliament	Years	Member	Party
1st	1867–1872	John Wallace	Liberal
2nd	1872–1874	John Wallace	Liberal
3rd	1874–1878	John Wallace	Liberal
4th	1878–1882	Alexander Rogers	Liberal
5th	1882–1883	John Wallace	Liberal
5th	1883–1887	John Wallace	Liberal–Conservative
6th	1887–1891	Richard Chapman Weldon	Conservative
7th	1891–1896	Richard Chapman Weldon	Conservative
8th	1896–1900	William James Lewis	Independent
9th	1900–1904	William James Lewis	Liberal
Riding dissolved into King's and Albert (1904–1917)

== Election results ==
=== 1900 ===
1900 Canadian federal election
Party	Candidate	Votes	%	±%
Liberal	William James Lewis	1,276	52.38	-3.41
Conservative	Richard Chapman Weldon	1,160	47.62	+3.41
Total valid votes		2,436	–	
Source: Library of Parliament

=== 1896 ===
1896 Canadian federal election
Party	Candidate	Votes	%	±%
Independent	William James Lewis	1,170	55.79	–
Conservative	Richard Chapman Weldon	927	44.21	-7.59
Total valid votes		2,097	–	
Source: Library of Parliament

=== 1891 ===
1891 Canadian federal election
Party	Candidate	Votes	%	±%
Conservative	Richard Chapman Weldon	1,096	51.80	-1.35
Liberal	Henry Emmerson	1,020	48.20	+1.35
Total valid votes		2,116	–	
Source: Library of Parliament

=== 1887 ===
1887 Canadian federal election
Party	Candidate	Votes	%	±%
Conservative	Richard Chapman Weldon	1,047	53.15	-0.25
Liberal	Alexander Rogers	923	46.85	+0.25
Total valid votes		1,970	–	
Source: Library of Parliament

=== 1883 by-election ===
Canadian federal by-election, 10 July 1883 On John Wallace being unseated, on petition, 2 May 1883
Party	Candidate	Votes	%	±%
Liberal–Conservative	John Wallace	934	53.40	+1.38
Liberal	Alexander Rogers	815	46.60	-1.38
Source: Library of Parliament

=== 1882 ===
1882 Canadian federal election
Party	Candidate	Votes	%	±%
Liberal	John Wallace	784	52.02	+19.59
Liberal	Alexander Rogers	723	47.98	+10.77
Total valid votes		1,507	–	
Source: Library of Parliament

=== 1878 ===
1878 Canadian federal election
Party	Candidate	Votes	%	±%
Liberal	Alexander Rogers	684	37.21	–
Liberal	John Wallace	596	32.43	-19.16
Unknown	James Domville	558	30.36	–
Total valid votes		1,838	–	
Source: Library of Parliament

=== 1874 ===
1874 Canadian federal election
Party	Candidate	Votes	%	±%
Liberal	John Wallace	810	51.59	-1.51
Unknown	Calhoun	760	48.41	+1.51
Total valid votes		1,570	–	
Source: Library of Parliament

=== 1872 ===
1872 Canadian federal election
Party	Candidate	Votes	%	±%
Liberal	John Wallace	847	53.10	+0.96
Unknown	Calhoun	748	46.90	–
Total valid votes		1,595	–	
Source: Library of Parliament

=== 1867 ===
1867 Canadian federal election
Party	Candidate	Votes	%
Liberal	John Wallace	778	52.14
Unknown	Henry J. Stevens	714	47.86
Total valid votes		1,492	–
Source: Library of Parliament

== See also ==
- List of Canadian electoral districts
- Historical federal electoral districts of Canada
