= Lucie Charlebois =

Canadian politician

Member of the National Assembly of Quebec for Soulanges
- In office May 1, 2003 – October 18, 2018
- Preceded by: Serge Deslières
- Succeeded by: Marilyne Picard

Personal details
- Born: July 14, 1959 Coteau-Station, Quebec
- Party: Quebec Liberal Party

Lucie Charlebois (born July 14, 1959 in Coteau-Station, now called Les Coteaux, in the riding of Soulanges, Quebec) is a Quebec politician. She was the Member of the National Assembly of Quebec for Soulanges and Minister for Rehabilitation, Youth Protection and Public Health. A business executive, she comes from the business community and is well known in the Soulanges region. She was the owner of her company for eleven years. She was a member of the Soulanges business people association and its president for two years.

Early in 2003, she decided to run for public office and was elected MNA for Soulanges in the provincial elections of April 14 of that year. She was re-elected in the 2007, 2008, and 2012 elections. Lucie Charlebois has also been Assistant Government Whip and she served on several parliamentary committees of the National Assembly.

She served as the Chief Government Whip from 2011 to 2014. Following her re-election in 2014, Charlebois was appointed Minister for Rehabilitation, Youth Protection and Public Health.

Following Pierre Moreau's leave of absence, she took on the role of Minister Responsible for Montérégie.

She was defeated in the 2018 election.
