= Alexander Rogers (Canadian politician) =

Canadian politician

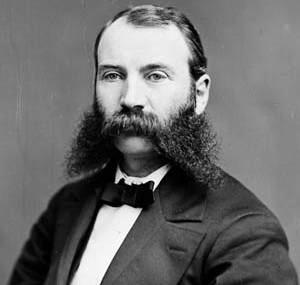
Alexander Rogers Source: Library and Archives Canada

Alexander Rogers (February 12, 1842 – July 2, 1933) was a merchant and political figure in New Brunswick, Canada. He represented Albert County in the Legislative Assembly of New Brunswick from 1875 to 1878 and Albert in the House of Commons of Canada from 1878 to 1882 as a Liberal member.

He was born in Hopewell Hill, New Brunswick, the son of William Rogers and Eliza Loughead, and was educated at Mount Allison College. In 1866, Rogers married Bessie Moore. His election to the provincial assembly was appealed twice but Rogers won the by-elections which followed each time. He ran unsuccessfully for reelection to the House of Commons in 1882, 1883 and 1887. He died at Hopewell Hill at the age of 91.

== Electoral record ==
1878 Canadian federal election: Albert
Party	Candidate	Votes	%	±%
Liberal	Alexander Rogers	684	37.2	n/a
Liberal	John Wallace	596	32.4	-19.2
Unknown	J.W. Domville	558	30.4	n/a
Source: Canadian Elections Database

1882 Canadian federal election: Albert
Party	Candidate	Votes	%	±%
Liberal	John Wallace	784	52.0	+19.6
Liberal	Alexander Rogers	723	48.0	+10.8

Canadian federal by-election, 10 July 1883
Party	Candidate	Votes	%	±%
On Mr. Wallace being unseated, on petition, 2 May 1883
Liberal–Conservative	John Wallace	934	53.4	+1.4
Liberal	Alexander Rogers	815	46.6	-1.4

1887 Canadian federal election: Albert
Party	Candidate	Votes	%	±%
Conservative	Richard C. Weldon	1,047	53.1	n/a
Liberal	Alexander Rogers	923	46.9	+0.3
