= Boulonnais =

Boulonnais may refer to:

- Boulonnais horse, a horse breed
- Boulonnais (land area), a region in northern France

== See also ==
- Bourbonnais (disambiguation)
