= Bocage bourbonnais =

Small French natural region, west of the Allier department in Auvergne

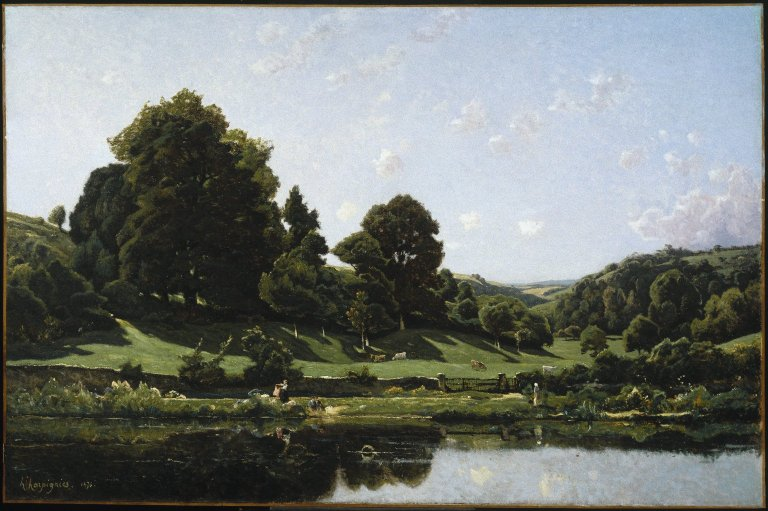
Brooklyn Museum – A Meadow in the Bourbonnais Morning (Une Prairie du Bourbonnais par un effet de matin) by Henri-Joseph Harpignies

Le Bocage bourbonnais is a small French natural region, west of the Allier department in Auvergne. Its name stems from the ancient province of Bourbonnais.

== Situation ==
Le bocage lies in the Bourbonnais natural region, west of the Allier and Cher rivers, around Cosne-d'Allier and Bourbon-l'Archambault.

It is surrounded by the following natural regions:

- Limagne bourbonnaise (south)
- Combrailles and le Boischaut Sud (west)
- le Val de Germigny et le Nivernais (north)
- Sologne bourbonnaise (east)
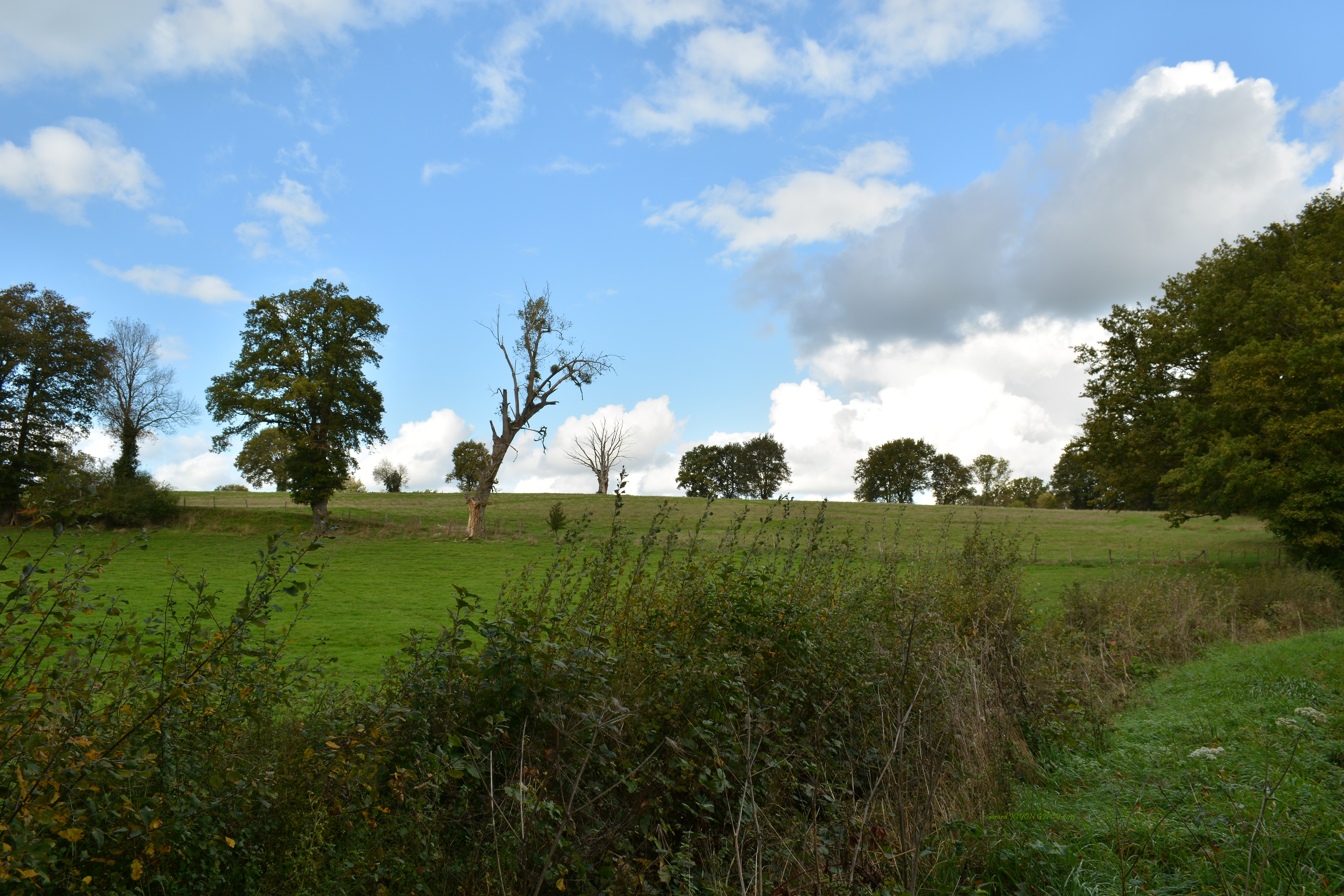
near Gipcy

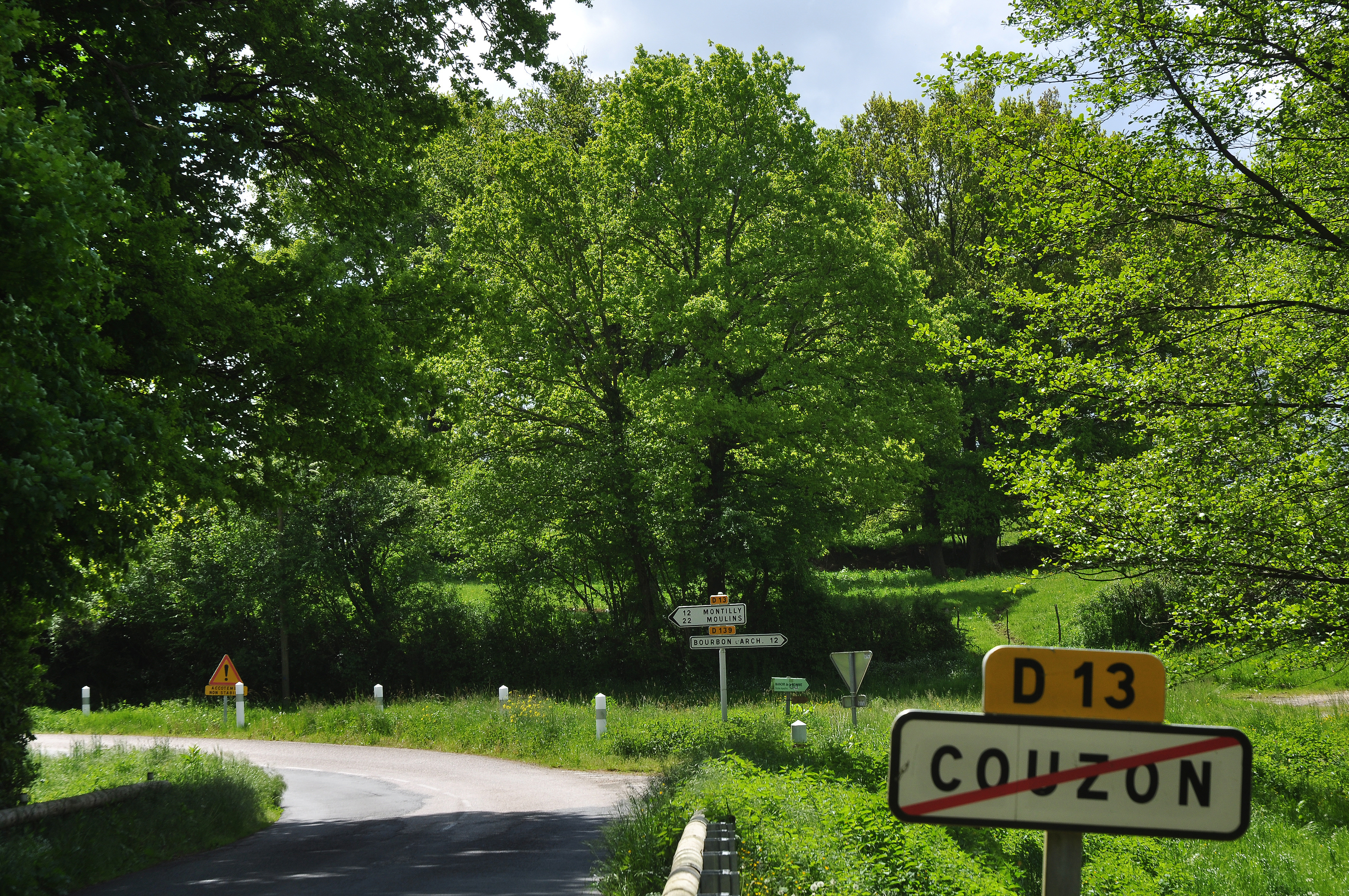

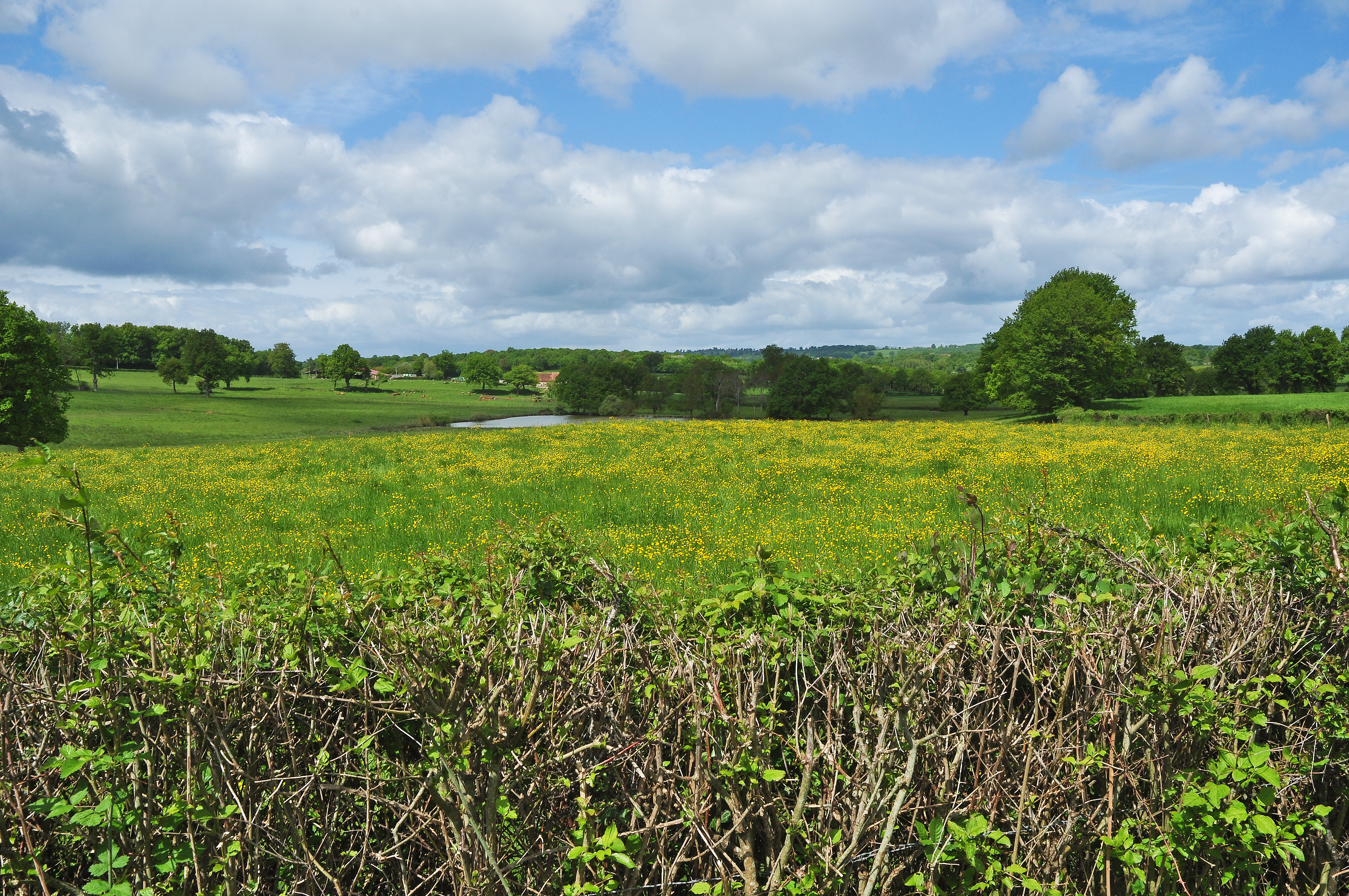
near Couzon

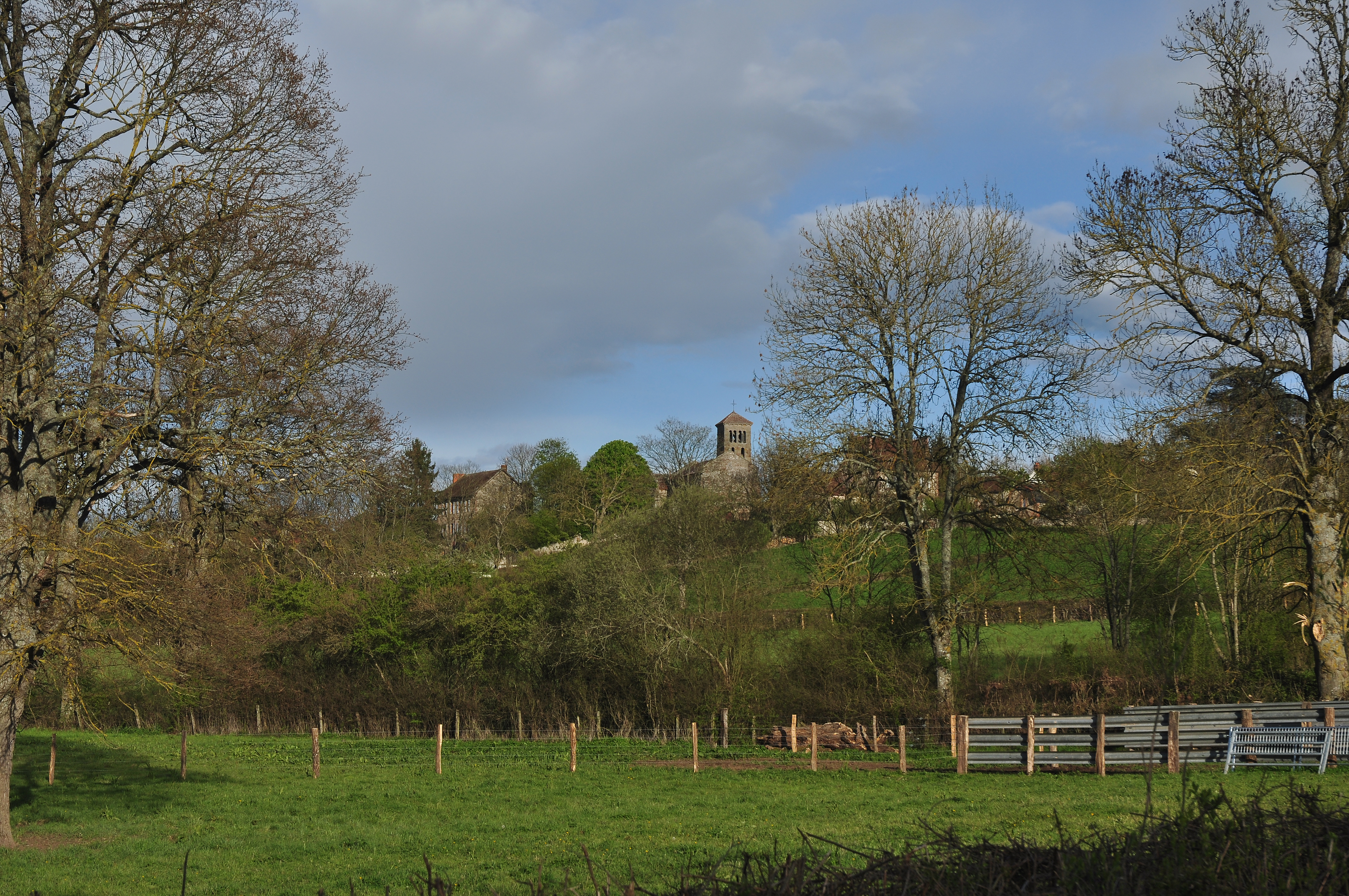
near Agonges

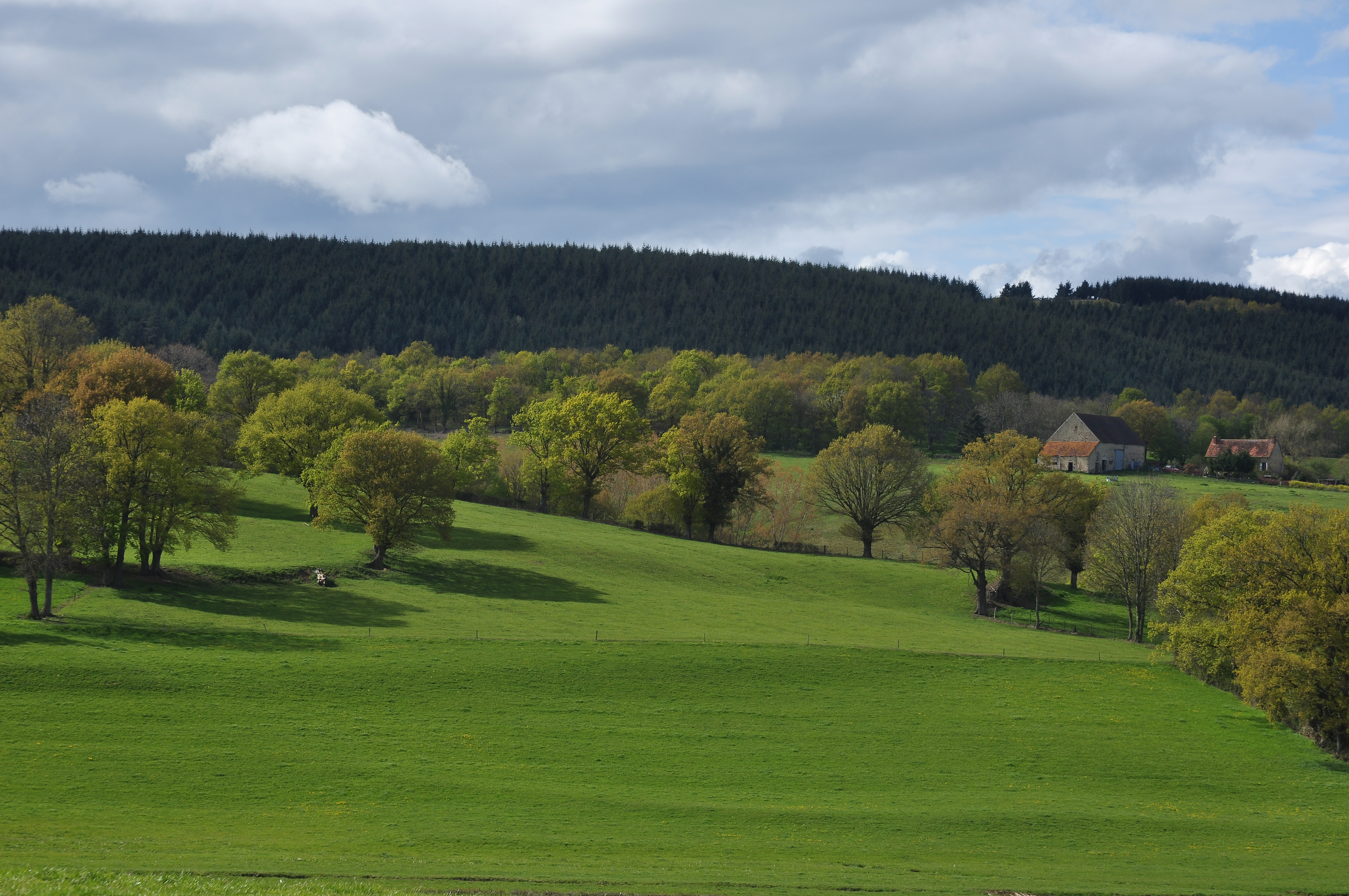
valley east of Noyant-d'Allier

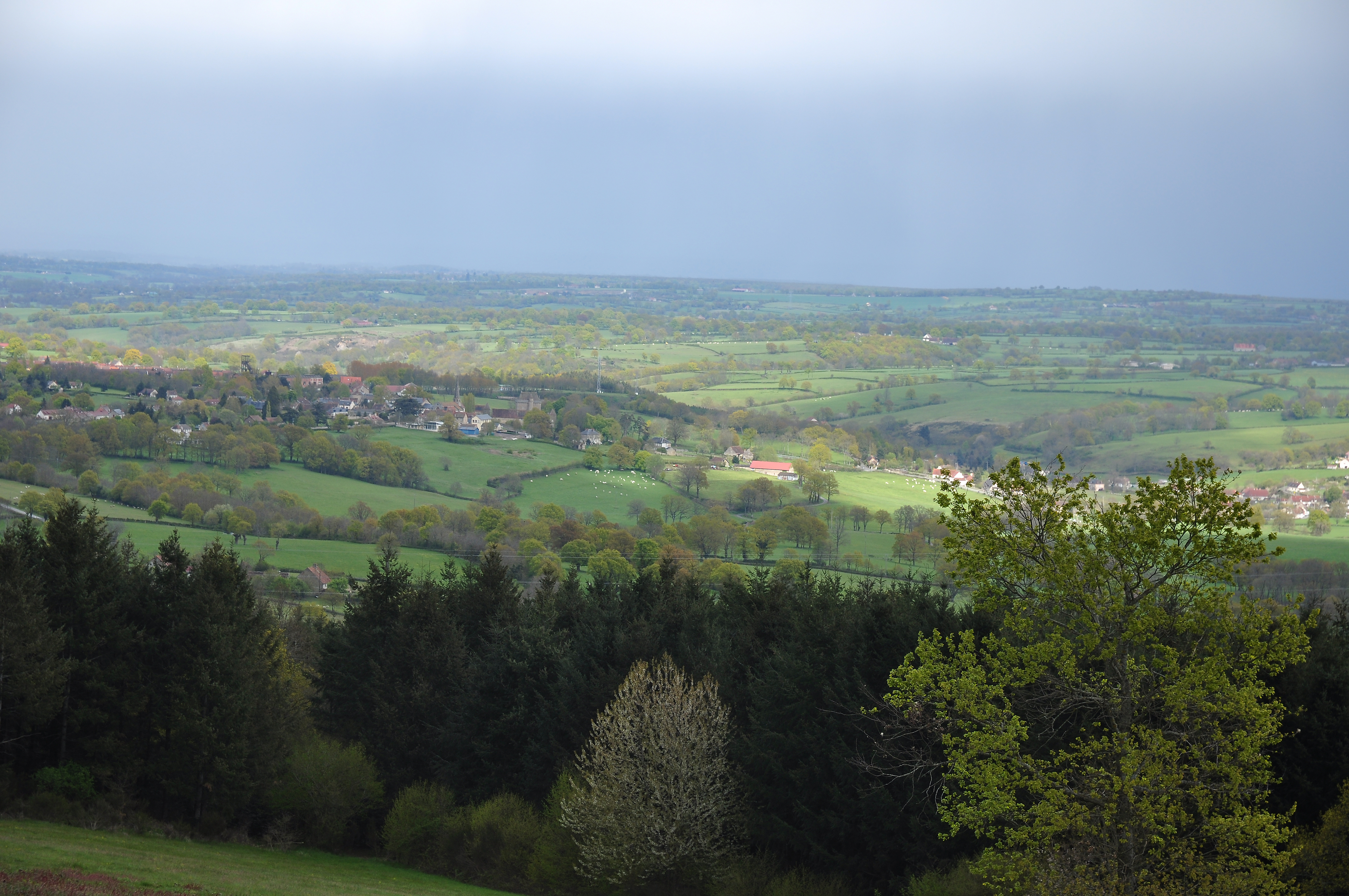
panorama on Noyant-d'Allier
