= Soulanges (provincial electoral district) =

Provincial electoral district in Quebec, Canada

Coordinates: 45.36°N 74.26°W

Quebec electoral district
- Location in Vaudreuil-Soulanges

Provincial electoral district
- Legislature: National Assembly of Quebec
MNA
Olivier Bertin-Mahieux
Liberal
- District created: 1867; 159 years ago
- District abolished: 1939; 87 years ago
- District re-created: 2001; 25 years ago
- First contested: 1867, 2003
- Last contested: 1939, 2026

Demographics
- Population (2011): 62,095
- Electors (2014): 48,340
- Area (km²): 795.1
- Pop. density (per km²): 78.1
- Census division: Vaudreuil-Soulanges (part)
- Census subdivision(s): Hudson, Les Cèdres, Les Coteaux, Pointe-des-Cascades, Pointe-Fortune, Rigaud, Rivière-Beaudette, Saint-Clet, Sainte-Justine-de-Newton, Saint-Lazare, Sainte-Marthe, Saint-Polycarpe, Saint-Télesphore, Saint-Zotique, Très-Saint-Rédempteur, Vaudreuil-Dorion (part)

Soulanges (French pronunciation: [sulɑ̃ʒ]) is a provincial electoral district in the Montérégie region of Quebec, Canada, that elects members to the National Assembly of Quebec. It notably includes the municipalities of Saint-Lazare, Saint-Zotique, and Rigaud.

It was created for the 1867 election (and an electoral district of that name existed earlier in the Legislative Assembly of the Province of Canada). Its final election was in 1936, and its successor electoral district was Vaudreuil-Soulanges.

It was re-created for the 2003 election from parts of Salaberry-Soulanges and Vaudreuil.

In the change from the 2001 to the 2011 electoral map, its territory was unchanged.

In the change from the 2011 to the 2017 electoral map, the riding gained Hudson from Vaudreuil.

In 2026, it lost Coteau-du-Lac while gaining the Radisson, Val-des-Pins, Tree Farm, Hudson Acres, Secteur-Como, Pointe-Cavagnal, L'Anse-Vaudreuil and Seigneurie-de-Vaudreuil neighbourhoods of Vaudreuil-Dorion.

== Members of the Legislative Assembly / National Assembly ==
Legislature	Years	Member	Party
1st	1867–1871	Dominique-Amable Coutlée	Conservative
2nd	1871–1875	Georges-Raoul-Léotale-Guichart-Humbert; Saveuse de Beaujeu	Conservative
3rd	1875–1878	Georges-Raoul-Léotale-Guichart-Humbert; Saveuse de Beaujeu	Independent
4th	1878–1881	William Duckett	Conservative
5th	1881–1886	William Duckett	Conservative
6th	1886–1890	Avila-Gonzague Bourbonnais	Parti national
7th	1890–1892	Avila-Gonzague Bourbonnais	Parti national
8th	1892–1897	Avila-Gonzague Bourbonnais	Liberal
9th	1897–1900	Avila-Gonzague Bourbonnais	Liberal
10th	1900–1902†	Avila-Gonzague Bourbonnais	Liberal
10th	1902–1904	Arcade-Momer Bissonnette	Conservative
11th	1904–1908	Joseph-Octave Mousseau	Liberal
12th	1908–1912	Joseph-Octave Mousseau	Liberal
13th	1912–1916	Joseph-Octave Mousseau	Liberal
14th	1916–1919	Avila Farand	Liberal
15th	1919–1923	Avila Farand	Liberal
16th	1923–1927	Joseph-Arthur Lortie	Conservative
17th	1927–1931	Avila Farand	Liberal
18th	1931–1935	Avila Farand	Liberal
19th	1935–1936	Avila Farand	Liberal
20th	1936–1939	Édouard Leduc	Union Nationale
Riding dissolved into Vaudreuil-Soulanges
Riding re-created from Salaberry-Soulanges and Vaudreuil
37th	2003–2007	Lucie Charlebois	Liberal
38th	2007–2008	Lucie Charlebois	Liberal
39th	2008–2012	Lucie Charlebois	Liberal
40th	2012–2014	Lucie Charlebois	Liberal
41st	2014–2018	Lucie Charlebois	Liberal
42nd	2018–2022	Marilyne Picard	Coalition Avenir Québec
43rd	2022–2026	Marilyne Picard	Coalition Avenir Québec
44th	2026–Present	Olivier Bertin-Mahieux	Liberal

== Election results ==
2026 Quebec general election
** Preliminary results — Not yet official **
Party	Candidate	Votes	%	±%
Liberal	Olivier Bertin-Mahieux	14,174	35.51	
Parti Québécois	Francis Deroo	10,124	25.36	
Conservative	Kristian Solarik	7,067	17.70	
Coalition Avenir Québec	Marilyne Picard	5,527	13.85	
Québec solidaire	Florian Martin	2,406	6.03	
Canadian	Joseph Cianflone	485	1.21	
Démocratie directe	Jules Briand	136	0.34	
Total valid votes				
Total rejected ballots				
Turnout			68.61	
Electors on the lists			–	–
Liberal gain from Coalition Avenir Québec		Swing		+
Source: Élections Québec

2022 Quebec general election redistributed results
Party	Vote	%
Coalition Avenir Québec	14,981	41.17
Liberal	8,626	23.71
Conservative	4,573	12.57
Québec solidaire	3,811	10.47
Parti Québécois	3,593	9.87
Others	802	2.20

2022 Quebec general election
Party	Candidate	Votes	%	±%
Coalition Avenir Québec	Marilyne Picard	17,114	42.62	+3.39
Liberal	Catherine St-Amour	8,761	21.82	-11.92
Conservative	Éloise Coulombe	5,006	12.47	+11.64
Québec solidaire	Sophie Samson	4,353	10.84	-0.71
Parti Québécois	Samuel Patenaude	4,124	10.27	+0.02
Green	Kristian Solarik	795	1.98	+0.11
Total valid votes		40,153	98.76	
Total rejected ballots		506	1.24	
Turnout		40,659	67.37	-2.96
Electors on the lists		60,353		
Coalition Avenir Québec hold		Swing		–

2018 Quebec general election
Party	Candidate	Votes	%	±%
Coalition Avenir Québec	Marilyne Picard	15,307	39.23	
Liberal	Lucie Charlebois	13,165	33.74	-20.66
Québec solidaire	Maxime Larue-Bourdages	4,508	11.55	+1.71
Parti Québécois	Samuelle D.-Henry	4,001	10.25	-21.37
Green	Bianca Jitaru	729	1.87	
New Democratic	Etienne Madelein	424	1.09	
Conservative	Felice Trombino	322	0.83	
Citoyens au pouvoir	Dominik Prud'homme	292	0.75	
Bloc Pot	Jean-Patrick Berthiaume	205	0.53	
Équipe Autonomiste	Patrick Marquis	65	0.17	
Total valid votes		39,018	98.61	
Total rejected ballots		551	1.39	
Turnout		39,569	70.33	
Eligible voters		56,258		
Coalition Avenir Québec gain from Liberal		Swing		+10.33
Source(s) "Rapport des résultats officiels du scrutin". Élections Québec.

2014 Quebec general election
Party	Candidate	Votes	%	±%
Liberal	Lucie Charlebois	18,925	54.40	+19.35
Parti Québécois	Marie-Louise Séguin	11,002	31.62	+0.72
Québec solidaire	Andrée Bessette	3,425	9.84	+6.22
Parti équitable	Patricia Domingos	961	2.76	+1.73
Option nationale	Patrick Marquis	478	1.37	+0.02
Total valid votes		34,791	96.05	–
Total rejected ballots		1,429	3.95	+2.67
Turnout		36,220	74.93	-4.07
Electors on the lists		48,340	–	–
Liberal hold		Swing		+9.31

2012 Quebec general election
Party	Candidate	Votes	%	±%
Liberal	Lucie Charlebois	12,795	35.05	-11.24
Parti Québécois	André Bouthilier	11,281	30.90	-6.05
Coalition Avenir Québec	Mario Gagner	10,234	28.03*	+16.05
Québec solidaire	Andrée Bessette	1,323	3.62	+1.79
Option nationale	Frédéric Roy	495	1.36	–
Independent	Patricia Domingos	378	1.04	–
Total valid votes		36,506	98.72	–
Total rejected ballots		473	1.28	–
Turnout		36,979	79.00%	–
Electors on the lists		46,809	–	–

* Result compared to Action démocratique

2008 Quebec general election
Party	Candidate	Votes	%	±%
Liberal	Lucie Charlebois	11,564	46.29	–
Parti Québécois	Louisanne Chevrier	9,229	36.95	–
Action démocratique	Daniel Lavigne	2,992	11.98	–
Green	Daniel Eperjusy	736	2.95	–
Québec solidaire	Jonathan Vallée-Payette	459	1.84	–

2007 Quebec general election
Party	Candidate	Votes	%	±%
Liberal	Lucie Charlebois	10,689	36.03	
Action démocratique	Sylvain Brazeau	9,212	31.05	
Parti Québécois	Marc Laviolette	7,821	26.36	
Green	Alain Brazeau	1,389	4.68	–
Québec solidaire	Marielle Rodrigue	442	1.49	
Independent	Gilles Paquette	113	0.38	

2003 Quebec general election
Party	Candidate	Votes	%	±%
Liberal	Lucie Charlebois	13,473	50.99	
Parti Québécois	Gaëtane Legault	8,753	33.13	
Action démocratique	Pierre Éloi Talbot	3,549	13.43	
Bloc Pot	Gloria Sawyer	327	1.24	
Green	Sandra Stephenson	320	1.21	–

== See also ==
- List of Quebec provincial electoral districts
- Canadian provincial electoral districts
