= Louis Sylvestre =

Canadian politician (1832–1914)

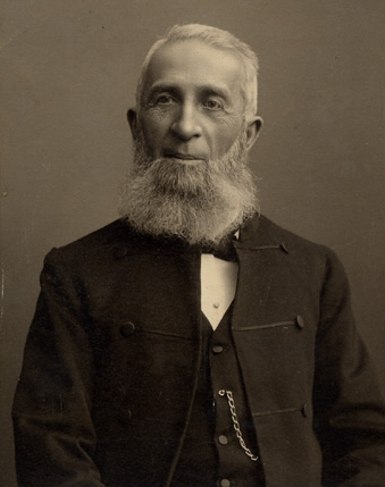

Member of the Legislative Assembly of Quebec for Berthier
- In office 1871–1878
- Preceded by: Louis-Joseph Moll
- Succeeded by: Joseph Robillard
- In office 1886–1889
- Preceded by: Joseph Robillard
- Succeeded by: Omer Dostaler

Member of the Legislative Council of Quebec for De Lanaudière
- In office 1890–1905
- Preceded by: Vincent-Paul Lavallée
- Succeeded by: Jules Allard

Personal details
- Born: February 12, 1832 Sainte-Genevière-de-Berthier, Lower Canada
- Died: February 10, 1914 (aged 81) Berthierville, Quebec
- Party: Liberal
- Relations: Armand Sylvestre, grandson

Louis Sylvestre (February 12, 1832 – February 10, 1914) was a farmer and political figure in Quebec. He represented Berthier in the Legislative Assembly of Quebec from 1871 to 1878 and from 1886 to 1889 as a Liberal.

He was born in Sainte-Geneviève-de-Berthier, Lower Canada, the son of Pierre Sylvestre and Josephte Rivard, dit Lavigne. He was educated at the Collège de l'Assomption and established a farm at Île-Dupas. In 1848, he married Marie Plante. Sylvestre served on the local school board as commissioner, secretary and president. He was also mayor of Île-Dupas. Sylvestre was defeated by Joseph Robillard when he ran for reelection in 1878. He ran unsuccessfully for a federal seat in 1882. He resigned his seat in the Quebec assembly in 1889 and represented the Lanaudière division in the Legislative Council of Quebec from 1890 to 1905. He died in Berthierville at the age of 81.

His grandson Armand Sylvestre served in the Canadian House of Commons.
