= Soulanges (federal electoral district) =

Former federal electoral district in Quebec, Canada

Quebec electoral district

Defunct federal electoral district
- Legislature: House of Commons
- District created: 1867
- District abolished: 1914
- First contested: 1867
- Last contested: 1911

Soulanges (French pronunciation: [sulɑ̃ʒ]) was a federal electoral district in Quebec, Canada, that was represented in the House of Commons of Canada from 1867 to 1917.

It was created by the British North America Act, 1867. The electoral district was abolished in 1914 when it was merged into Vaudreuil—Soulanges riding.

== Members of Parliament ==
This riding has elected the following members of Parliament:

Parliament	Years	Member	Party
Soulanges
1st	1867–1872	Luc-Hyacinthe Masson	Conservative
2nd	1872–1874	Jacques-Philippe Lantier	Conservative
3rd	1874–1878	Jacques-Philippe Lantier	Conservative
4th	1878–1882	Jacques-Philippe Lantier	Conservative
5th	1882–1882	Jacques-Philippe Lantier	Conservative
5th	1882–1883	G.R.L. Saveuse de Beaujeu	Conservative
5th	1883–1884	James William Bain	Conservative
5th	1885–1887	James William Bain	Conservative
6th	1887–1891	James William Bain	Conservative
7th	1891–1891	Joseph Octave Mousseau	Independent
7th	1892–1892	James William Bain	Conservative
7th	1892–1896	James William Bain	Conservative
8th	1896–1900	Augustin Bourbonnais	Liberal
9th	1900–1904	Augustin Bourbonnais	Liberal
10th	1904–1908	Augustin Bourbonnais	Liberal
11th	1908–1911	Joseph-Arthur Lortie	Conservative
12th	1911–1917	Wilfrid Laurier	Liberal
Riding dissolved into Vaudreuil—Soulanges

== Election results ==
1867 Canadian federal election
Party	Candidate	Votes
Conservative	Luc-Hyacinthe Masson	729
Unknown	M. Guindon	470
Eligible voters		1,757
Source: Canadian Parliamentary Guide, 1871

1872 Canadian federal election
Party	Candidate	Votes
Conservative	Jacques-Philippe Lantier	759
Conservative	R.S. De Beaujeu	520

1874 Canadian federal election
Party	Candidate	Votes
Conservative	Jacques-Philippe Lantier	acclaimed

1878 Canadian federal election
Party	Candidate	Votes
Conservative	Jacques-Philippe Lantier	852
Unknown	L.H. Masson	325

1882 Canadian federal election
Party	Candidate	Votes
Conservative	Jacques-Philippe Lantier	761
Conservative	G.R.L. de Beaujeu	675

By-election on 27 October 1882 On Mr. Lantier's death, 15 September 1882
Party	Candidate	Votes
Conservative	G.R.L. de Beaujeu	748
Conservative	James William Bain	745

By-election on 27 December 1883 On Mr. De Beaujeu being unseated on petition, 11 December 1883
Party	Candidate	Votes
Conservative	James William Bain	760
Conservative	G.R.L. de Beaujeu	734

By-election on 5 February 1885 On election being declared void, 15 January 1884
Party	Candidate	Votes
Conservative	James William Bain	acclaimed

1887 Canadian federal election
Party	Candidate	Votes
Conservative	James William Bain	927
Independent	Joseph Octave Mousseau	756
Nationalist	Cam. Lalonde	28

1891 Canadian federal election
Party	Candidate	Votes
Independent	Joseph Octave Mousseau	934
Conservative	James William Bain	895

By-election on 3 February 1892 On election being declared void, 23 December 1891
Party	Candidate	Votes
Conservative	James William Bain	elected, vote count unknown
Independent	Joseph Octave Mousseau	defeated, vote count unknown

By-election on 13 December 1892 Election being declared void, 11 November 1892
Party	Candidate	Votes
Conservative	James William Bain	elected, vote count unknown
Independent	Joseph Octave Mousseau	defeated, vote count unknown

1896 Canadian federal election
Party	Candidate	Votes
Liberal	Augustin Bourbonnais	1,054
Conservative	Elzéar Lantier	861

1900 Canadian federal election
Party	Candidate	Votes
Liberal	Augustin Bourbonnais	1,105
Conservative	A.M. Bissonnette	861

1904 Canadian federal election
Party	Candidate	Votes
Liberal	Augustin Bourbonnais	1,063
Conservative	Ludger Séguin	839

1908 Canadian federal election
Party	Candidate	Votes
Conservative	Joseph-Arthur Lortie	942
Liberal	Augustin Bourbonnais	889

1911 Canadian federal election
Party	Candidate	Votes	%	Elected
Liberal	Wilfrid Laurier	1,045	53.64	✓
Conservative	Joseph-Arthur Lortie	903	46.36	
Total valid votes		1,948	100.00	
Source(s) "Soulanges, Quebec (1867-08-06 - 1917-10-05)". History of Federal Ridings Since 1867. Library of Parliament.

== See also ==
- List of Canadian electoral districts
- Historical federal electoral districts of Canada
