= Jacques-Philippe Lantier =

Canadian politician (1814–1882)

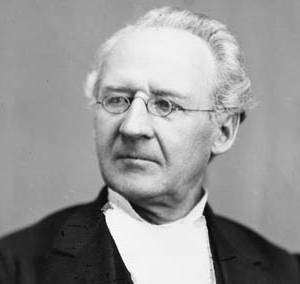

Member of the Canadian Parliament for Soulanges
- In office 1872–1882
- Preceded by: Luc-Hyacinthe Masson
- Succeeded by: G.R.L. de Beaujeu

Personal details
- Born: July 21, 1814 Saint-Polycarpe, Lower Canada
- Died: September 15, 1882 (aged 68) Saint-Polycarpe, Quebec, Canada
- Party: Conservative

Jacques-Philippe Lantier (French pronunciation: [ʒak filip lɑ̃tje]; July 21, 1814 – September 15, 1882) was a Quebec businessman, author, and political figure. He represented Soulanges in the House of Commons of Canada as a Conservative member from 1872 to 1882. Some sources also sometimes spell his surname Lanthier.

He was born at Saint-Polycarpe, Lower Canada in 1814 and studied at the Séminaire de Nicolet and the Petit Séminaire de Montréal. Lantier owned a store at Saint-Polycarpe. He was elected to the Legislative Assembly of the Province of Canada for Vaudreuil in 1844. In 1865, Lantier married Julienne Bonneville, the widow of his brother Olivier, who had been a merchant at Montreal. He was elected to the House of Commons in 1872 and represented Soulanges until his death at Saint-Polycarpe in 1882.

Lantier published the pamphlets Canal des Cèdres (1873), The harbours of Coteau Landing and Cascades Bay (1874), and The question of the Cascades and Coteau Landing canal (1874).

In 1873, Lantier introduced a motion in the House of Commons asking for a pardon for all crimes committed in Manitoba before its entry into the Canadian union.
