= Boischaut =

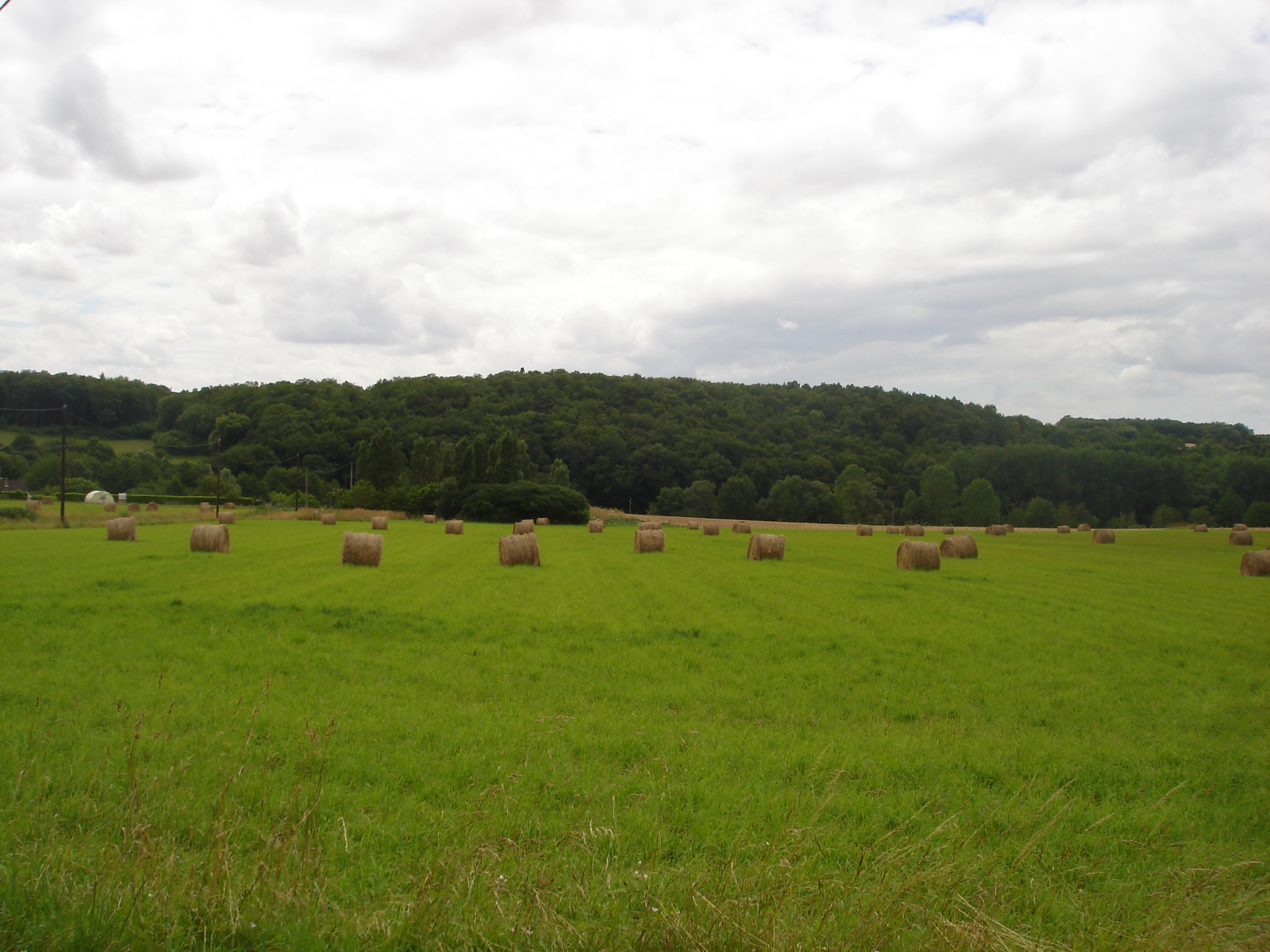
Boischaut nord

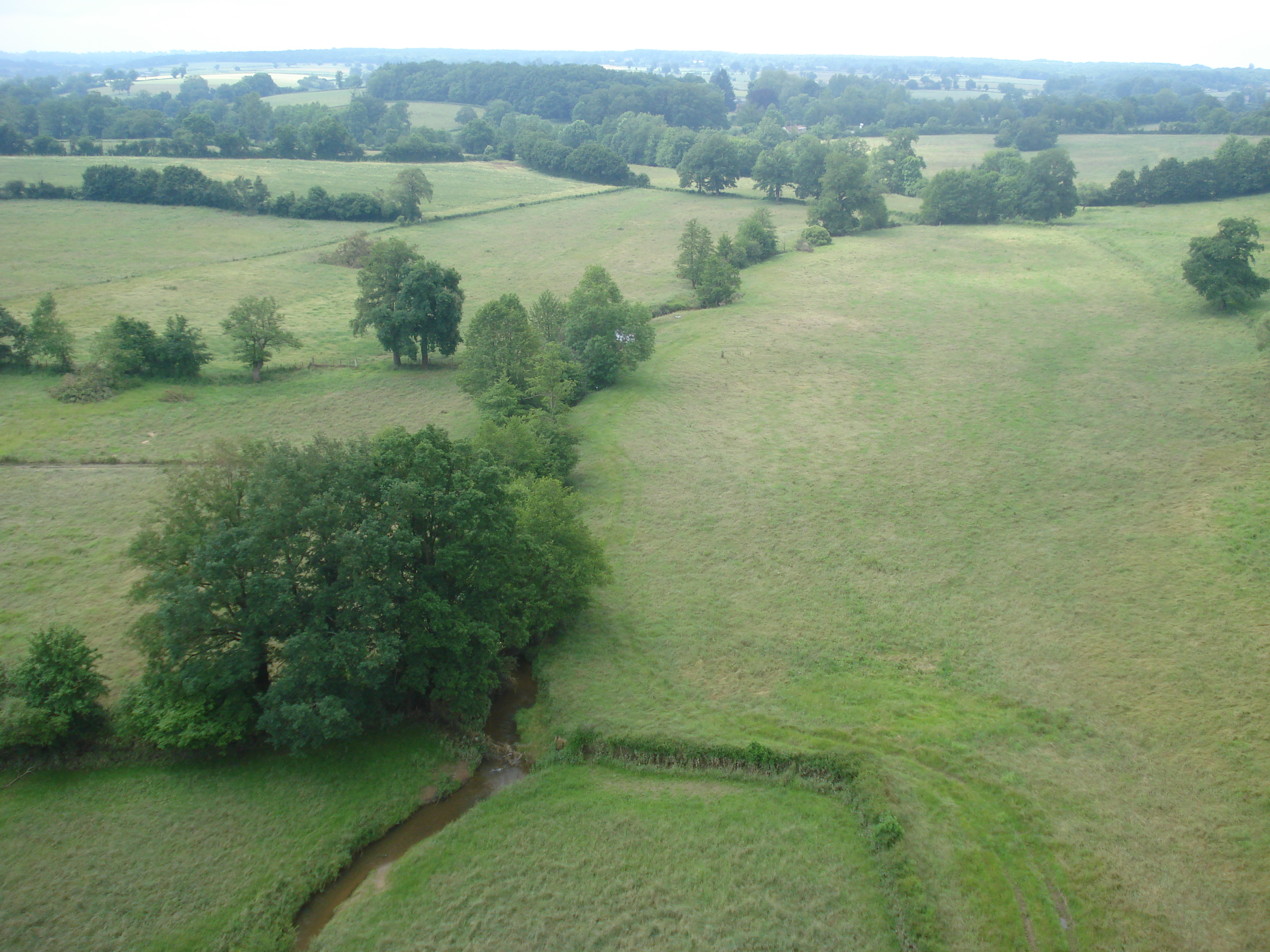
Boischaut sud

The Boischaut is a natural region of France, astride on the Indre and Cher departments.

It is divided into two sub-regions: north and south.

On 6 August 2025, a wildfire burned 9 hectares of the protected area.
