= James William Bain =

Canadian politician (1838–1909)

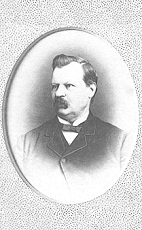

Member of the Canadian Parliament for Soulanges
- In office 1883–1891
- Preceded by: G.R.L. de Beaujeu
- Succeeded by: Joseph Octave Mousseau
- In office 1892–1896
- Preceded by: Joseph Octave Mousseau
- Succeeded by: Augustin Bourbonnais

Personal details
- Born: 22 June 1838 St. Polycarpe, Lower Canada
- Died: 27 October 1909 (aged 71)
- Party: Conservative
- Profession: merchant

James William Bain (22 June 1838 – 27 October 1909) was a Canadian politician and merchant. He was elected to the House of Commons of Canada in 1883 as a Member of the historical Conservative Party in the riding of Soulanges after Georges-Raoul-Léotale-Guichart-Humbert Saveuse de Beaujeu was unseated in a by-election. That election was later declared void on 15 January 1884, however, in a by-election held 5 February 1885, he was acclaimed to Soulanges. He won the election of 1887 and lost to his opponent, Joseph Octave Mousseau in the following election of 1891. Another by-election was held on 3 February 1892 after the votes in the previous election were declared void. He won this by-election and again the election was declared void on 11 November 1892 and yet again he won another by-election on 13 December 1892.
