= Avila-Gonzague Bourbonnais =

Canadian politician

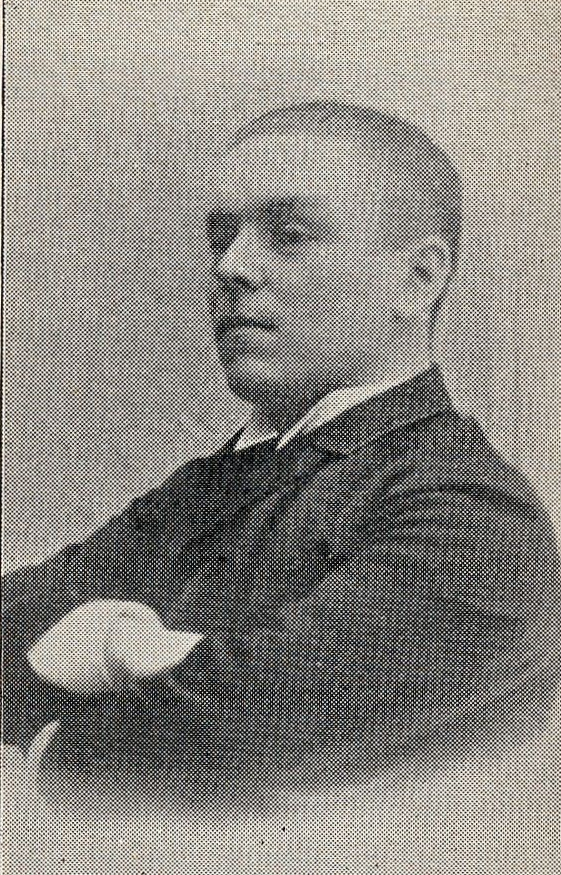
A.- G. Bourbannais

Avila-Gonzague Bourbonnais (October 17, 1859 – April 4, 1902) was a civil servant and political figure in Quebec. He represented Soulanges in the Legislative Assembly of Quebec from 1886 to 1892 as a Parti national member and from 1892 to 1902 as a Liberal member.

He was born in Saint-Clet, Canada East, the son of Michel Bourbonnais and Angèle Houle, and was educated at the Séminaire de Sainte-Thérèse and the Université Laval. Bourbonnais was the registrar for the Ministry of Public Works and Agriculture. In 1884, he married Marie-Rose-Délia Lefebvre. He died in office in Quebec City at the age of 42 and was buried in the Notre Dame des Neiges Cemetery in Montreal.

His brother Augustin served in the Canadian House of Commons.
