= Augustin Bourbonnais =

Canadian politician

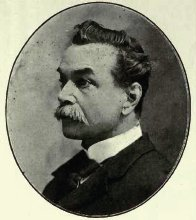

Member of the Canadian Parliament for Soulanges
- In office 1896–1908
- Preceded by: James William Bain
- Succeeded by: Joseph Arthur Lortie

Personal details
- Born: March 19, 1850 Saint-Clet, Canada East
- Died: August 5, 1923 (aged 73)
- Party: Liberal

Augustin Bourbonnais (French pronunciation: [oɡystɛ̃ buʁbɔnɛ]; March 19, 1850 – August 5, 1923) was a Canadian physician and politician.

Born in Saint-Clet, Soulanges County, Canada East, the son of Michel Bourbonnais and Angèle Houle, Bourbonnais was educated at the Seminary of Sainte-Thérèse, where he graduated a B.A. in 1872. He studied medicine at Laval University and became an M.D. in 1875. He first practised at Syracuse, New York and moved to Coteau Landing, Quebec. He was first elected to the House of Commons of Canada for the riding of Soulanges in the general elections of 1896. A Liberal, he was re-elected in 1900 and 1904. He was defeated in 1908.

His younger brother, Avila-Gonzague Bourbonnais, was a member of the Legislative Assembly of Quebec from 1886 to 1902.
