= Joseph Octave Mousseau =

Canadian politician

Member of the Canadian Parliament for Soulanges
- In office 1891–1892
- Preceded by: James William Bain
- Succeeded by: James William Bain

Personal details
- Born: 25 April 1844 Berthier, Canada East
- Died: 13 December 1898 (aged 54)
- Party: Independent
- Relations: Joseph-Alfred Mousseau, brother
- Children: Joseph-Octave Mousseau

Joseph Octave Mousseau (25 April 1844 – 13 December 1898) was a physician and political figure in Quebec. He represented Soulanges in the House of Commons of Canada from 1891 to 1892 as an Independent member.

He was born in Berthier, Canada East, the son of Louis Mousseau, who was the son of Alexis Mousseau, and Sophie Duteau, dit Grandpré. Mousseau was educated at Montreal and Nicolet. He served on the town council for Saint-Polycarpe and also served as mayor. Mousseau married Marie Rose-Avelina Cadieux. He ran unsuccessfully for a seat in the House of Commons in 1887. His election to the House of Commons in 1891 was overturned in 1892 and he was defeated by James William Bain in the two by-elections which followed.

He was the brother of Joseph-Alfred Mousseau. His son Joseph-Octave was a member of the Quebec legislative assembly.
