= Bourbonnaise (chicken) =

Breed of chicken

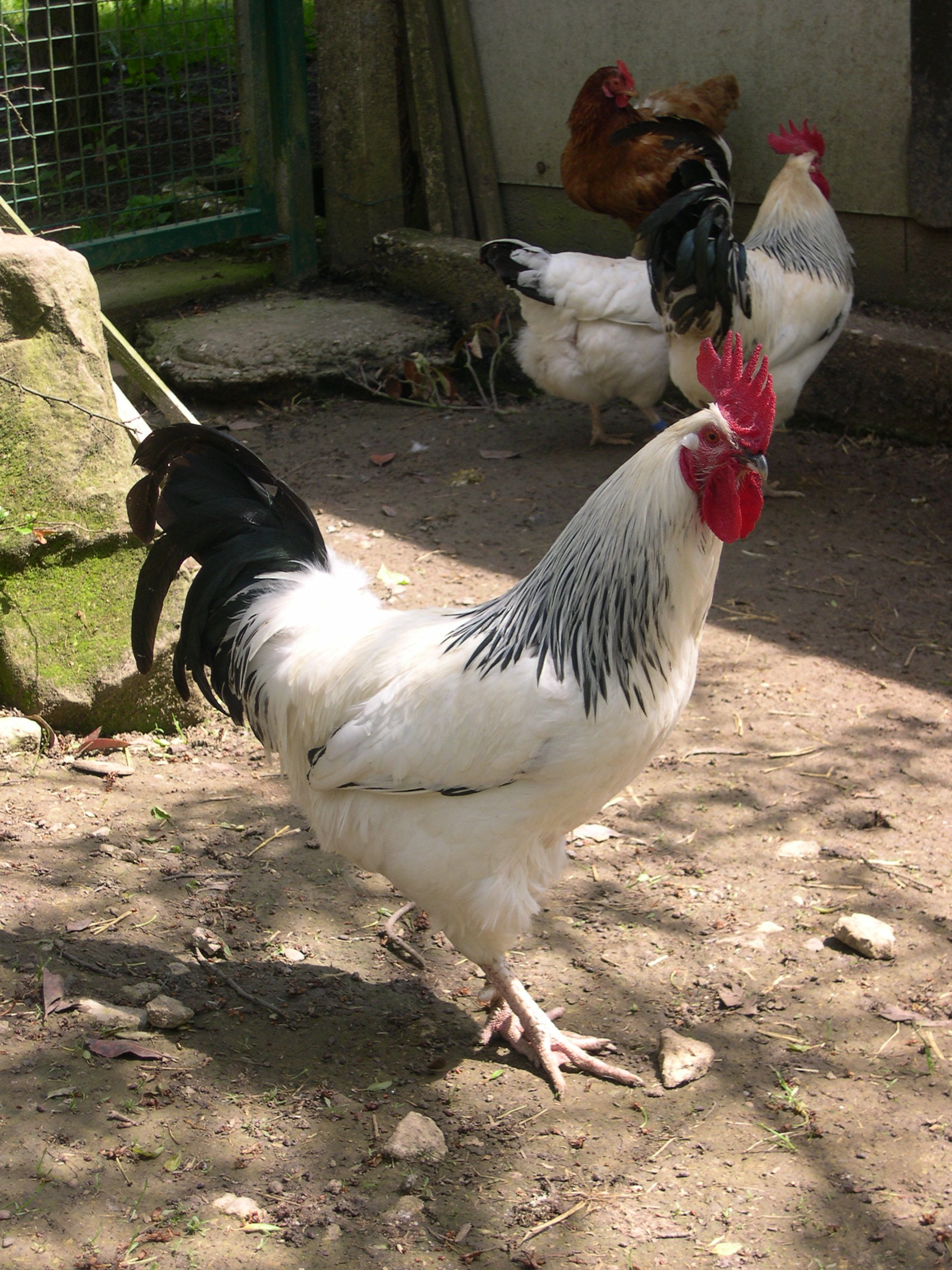
- Bourbonnais rooster
- Country of origin: France
- Use: eggs, meat, show

Traits
- Weight: Male: 3.5 kg; Female: 2.5 kg
- Egg color: white cream

Classification
- APA: continental
- ABA: clean legged
- PCGB: soft feather: heavy
- Chicken; Gallus gallus domesticus

The Bourbonnaise (French pronunciation: [buʁbɔnɛz]) is a French breed of chicken.

It is included on the Slow Food Foundation Ark of Taste.

== Description ==
The breed is a good farm bird, both a good layer (up to 200 eggs per year) and a good source of meat.

The essential characteristic of the Bourbonnaise is its high productivity. In addition, it is very vigorous, knows how to feed and defend itself. The breed acclimates to most conditions. Although preferring to be kept free-range, the breed can be raised in a chicken coop without a problem.

Well-nourished young grow quickly and reach adulthood by six months.

== Origin ==
This hen is from the province of the Bourbonnais, where white poultry, like the original Gâtinaise breed, have been raised for a very long time. Crosses between these and Brahmas made it possible to obtain a race called the Bourbonnaise herminée, the white ones kept the name of Gâtinaises.
