= Marilyne Picard =

Canadian politician

Member of the National Assembly of Quebec for Soulanges
- In office October 18, 2018 – October 5, 2026
- Preceded by: Lucie Charlebois
- Succeeded by: Olivier Bertin-Mahieux

Personal details
- Party: Coalition Avenir Québec

Marilyne Picard is a Canadian politician who was elected to the National Assembly of Quebec in the 2018 provincial election. She represented the electoral district of Soulanges as a member of the Coalition Avenir Québec until 2026.

== Electoral record ==
2026 Quebec general election: Soulanges
** Preliminary results — Not yet official **
| Party | Candidate | Votes | % | ±% |
|---|---|---|---|---|
| Liberal | Olivier Bertin-Mahieux | 14,174 | 35.51 | |
| Parti Québécois | Francis Deroo | 10,124 | 25.36 | |
| Conservative | Kristian Solarik | 7,067 | 17.70 | |
| Coalition Avenir Québec | Marilyne Picard | 5,527 | 13.85 | |
| Québec solidaire | Florian Martin | 2,406 | 6.03 | |
| Canadian | Joseph Cianflone | 485 | 1.21 | |
| Démocratie directe | Jules Briand | 136 | 0.34 | |
| Total valid votes | | | | |
| Total rejected ballots | | | | |
| Turnout | | | 68.61 | |
| Electors on the lists | | | – | – |
| Liberal gain from Coalition Avenir Québec | | Swing | | + |
Source: Élections Québec

2022 Quebec general election: Soulanges
| Party | Candidate | Votes | % | ±% |
|---|---|---|---|---|
| Coalition Avenir Québec | Marilyne Picard | 17,114 | 42.62 | +3.39 |
| Liberal | Catherine St-Amour | 8,761 | 21.82 | -11.92 |
| Conservative | Éloise Coulombe | 5,006 | 12.47 | +11.64 |
| Québec solidaire | Sophie Samson | 4,353 | 10.84 | -0.71 |
| Parti Québécois | Samuel Patenaude | 4,124 | 10.27 | +0.02 |
| Green | Kristian Solarik | 795 | 1.98 | +0.11 |
| Total valid votes | | 40,153 | 98.76 | |
| Total rejected ballots | | 506 | 1.24 | |
| Turnout | | 40,659 | 67.37 | -2.96 |
| Electors on the lists | | 60,353 | | |
| Coalition Avenir Québec hold | | Swing | | – |

2018 Quebec general election: Soulanges
| Party | Candidate | Votes | % | ±% |
|---|---|---|---|---|
| Coalition Avenir Québec | Marilyne Picard | 15,307 | 39.23 | |
| Liberal | Lucie Charlebois | 13,165 | 33.74 | -20.66 |
| Québec solidaire | Maxime Larue-Bourdages | 4,508 | 11.55 | +1.71 |
| Parti Québécois | Samuelle D.-Henry | 4,001 | 10.25 | -21.37 |
| Green | Bianca Jitaru | 729 | 1.87 | |
| New Democratic | Etienne Madelein | 424 | 1.09 | |
| Conservative | Felice Trombino | 322 | 0.83 | |
| Citoyens au pouvoir | Dominik Prud'homme | 292 | 0.75 | |
| Bloc Pot | Jean-Patrick Berthiaume | 205 | 0.53 | |
| Équipe Autonomiste | Patrick Marquis | 65 | 0.17 | |
| Total valid votes | | 39,018 | 98.61 | |
| Total rejected ballots | | 551 | 1.39 | |
| Turnout | | 39,569 | 70.33 | |
| Eligible voters | | 56,258 | | |
| Coalition Avenir Québec gain from Liberal | | Swing | | +10.33 |
Source(s) "Rapport des résultats officiels du scrutin". Élections Québec.
