= Joseph-Octave Mousseau =

Canadian politician

Joseph-Octave Mousseau (August 2, 1875 – December 2, 1965) was a lawyer and political figure in Quebec. He represented Soulanges in the Legislative Assembly of Quebec from 1904 to 1914 as a Liberal member.

He was born in Saint-Polycarpe, Quebec, the son of Joseph-Octave Mousseau and Rose-Avelina Cadieux. Mousseau studied at Collège Bourget at Rigaud and the Université Laval at Montreal; he was called to the Quebec bar in 1897 and set up practice in Montreal. In 1899, he married Clara Gagné. Mousseau was an unsuccessful candidate for a seat in the provincial assembly in a 1902 by-election. He was named King's Counsel in 1909. He served as party whip from 1913 to 1914. He resigned his seat in 1914 after being accused of corruption in the Montreal Daily Mail; these accusations were found to be justified by a committee of the assembly. In 1917, he married his cousin Annette, the daughter of Joseph-Alfred Mousseau. He was married a third time, to Cécile Langlois, in 1955. Mousseau died in Montreal at the age of 90 and was buried in Notre-Dame-des-Neiges Cemetery.

His sister Hortense married Joseph-Rodolphe Ouimet.
