= Georges-Raoul-Léotale-Guichart-Humbert Saveuse de Beaujeu =

Canadian politician

Georges-Raoul-Léotalde-Guichard-Humbert Saveuse de Beaujeu (French pronunciation: [ʒɔʁʒ ʁaul leɔtald ɡiʃaʁ œ̃bɛʁ savøz də boʒø]; 22 June 1847 – 15 December 1887) was a Quebec seigneur and political figure. He represented Soulanges in the Legislative Assembly of Quebec from 1871 to 1878 and in the House of Commons of Canada as a Conservative member from 1882 to 1883. Some sources give one of his names as Léotale.

He was born at Coteau-du-Lac in 1847, the son of seigneur Georges-René Saveuse de Beaujeu and the grandson of Philippe-Joseph Aubert de Gaspé. He studied at the Collège Sainte-Marie de Montréal and the Collège de Montréal. In 1865, he became coseigneur of the seigneuries of Soulanges and Nouvelle-Longueuil after the death of his father.

Saveuse de Beaujeu ran unsuccessfully for a seat in the House of Commons against Jacques Philippe Lantier in 1872 and 1881. He was first elected to the House of Commons in a by-election held in October 1882 after the death of Lantier; his election was declared invalid in December 1883 after an appeal and he was defeated in the by-election that followed.

In 1887, he died at Coteau-du-Lac.

Parliament of Canada
Preceded by Jacques Philippe Lantier	Member of Parliament for Soulanges; 1882–1883	Succeeded by James William Bain
