= John Wallace (Canadian politician) =

Canadian politician

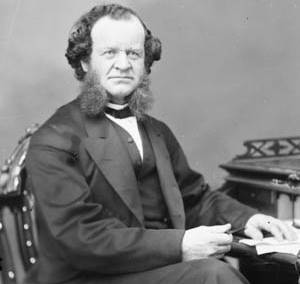
John Wallace Source: Library and Archives Canada

John Wallace (November 18, 1821 – January 1, 1896) was a New Brunswick farmer and political figure. He represented Albert in the House of Commons of Canada as a Liberal member from 1867 to 1878 and then from 1883 to 1887 as a Liberal and then as a Liberal-Conservative.

He was born in Hillsborough, New Brunswick in 1812, the son of James Wallace and Catherine Copp, and grew up there. His grandparents had come to New Brunswick from Donegal in northern Ireland. Wallace was president of the Albert Agricultural Society and also a justice of the peace. Besides operating a large farm, he also owned a sawmill and was a director of the Albert Southern Railway. Wallace was originally a Liberal. After his election in 1882 was appealed, he was elected again in an 1883 by-election after running as a Liberal-Conservative.

He was married three times: to Eleanor Russell in 1846, to Cynthia Foss in 1859 and to Charlotte Stackford in 1872.

== Electoral record ==
1867 Canadian federal election: Albert
Party	Candidate	Votes	%	±%
Liberal	John Wallace	778	52.1	n/a
Unknown	Henry Stevens	714	47.9	n/a
Source: Canadian Elections Database

1872 Canadian federal election: Albert
Party	Candidate	Votes	%	±%
Liberal	John Wallace	847	53.1	+1.0
Unknown	Calhoun	748	46.9	n/a
Source: Canadian Elections Database

1874 Canadian federal election: Albert
Party	Candidate	Votes	%	±%
Liberal	John Wallace	810	51.6	-1.5
Liberal	Calhoun	760	48.4	+1.5
Source: Canadian Elections Database

1878 Canadian federal election: Albert
Party	Candidate	Votes	%	±%
Liberal	Alexander Rogers	684	37.2	n/a
Liberal	John Wallace	596	32.4	-19.2
Unknown	J.W. Domville	558	30.4	n/a
Source: Canadian Elections Database

1882 Canadian federal election: Albert
Party	Candidate	Votes	%	±%
Liberal	John Wallace	784	52.0	+19.6
Liberal	Alexander Rogers	723	48.0	+10.8

Canadian federal by-election, 10 July 1883
Party	Candidate	Votes	%	±%
On Mr. Wallace being unseated, on petition, 2 May 1883
Liberal–Conservative	John Wallace	934	53.4	+1.4
Liberal	Alexander Rogers	815	46.6	-1.4
