= Camden East =

- Unincorporated village
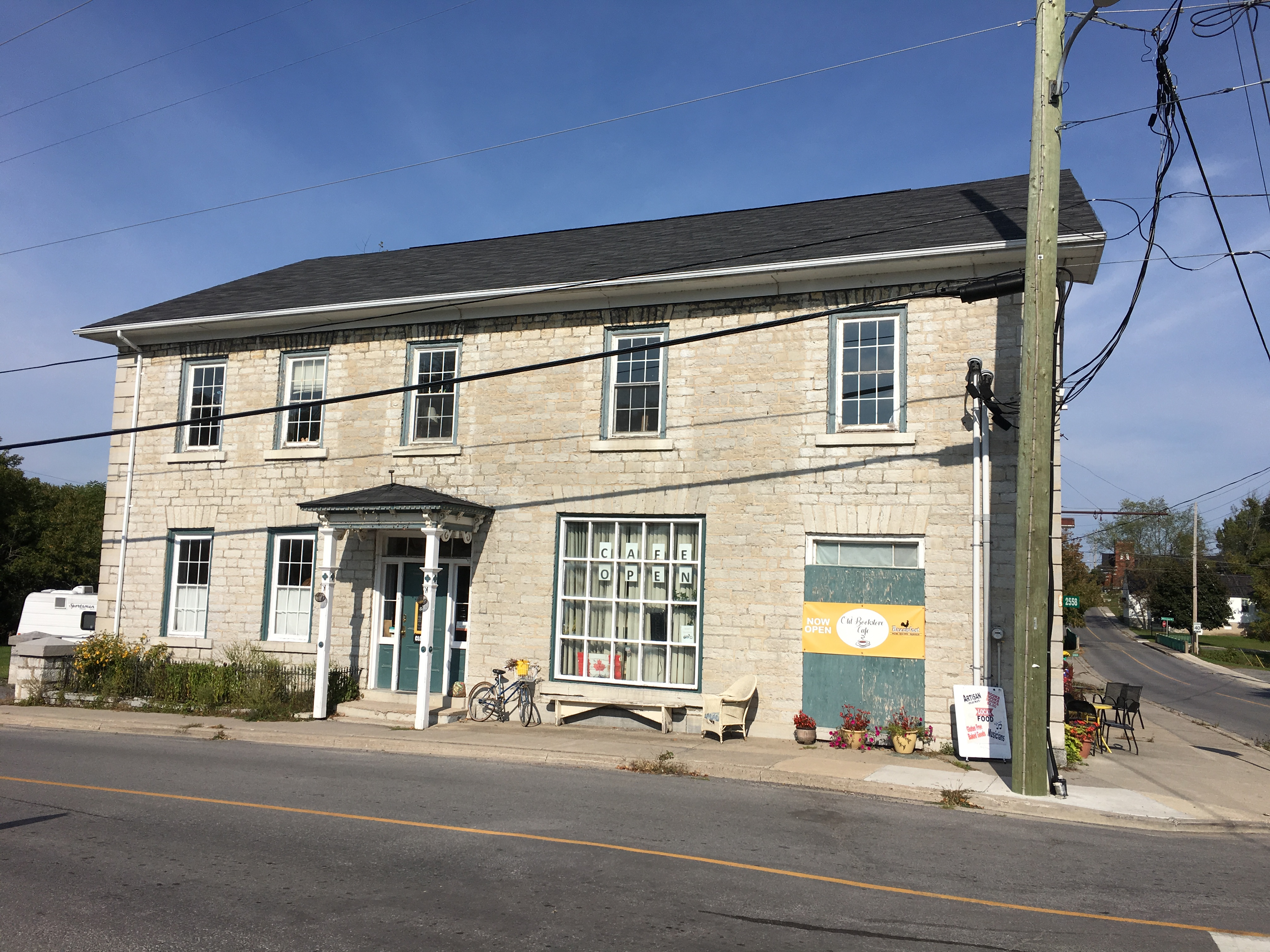
- The limestone building that housed a series of general stores including Haydon's

- Location within Southern Ontario
- Coordinates: 44°20′07″N 76°50′00″W
- Country: Canada
- Province: Ontario
- County: Lennox and Addington
- Municipality: Stone Mills

Government
  - Type: Unincorporated

Population (2009)
  - Total: 306
- Time zone: UTC-5 (EST)
  - Summer (DST): UTC-4 (EDT)
- Postal code: K0K 1J0
- Area code: 613

Camden East is a village in the Municipality of Stone Mills, located east of Greater Napanee in Lennox and Addington County, Ontario, Canada.

== History ==
In 1800, one of the first settlers was Albert Williams, the son of a United Empire Loyalist family. The first sawmill was built in 1818 on the Napanee River by Abel Scott at a site upstream of the present town. He sold the rights to the mill to Samuel Clark who moved it to the location we now know as Camden East, and added a wool mill and a grist mill. The community was then called Clark's Mills. In 1832, the post office was built. The name changed to Camden East, after the township which was organized in 1787 and named in honour of Charles Pratt, Earl of Camden, and Lord Chancellor of Great Britain in the late 18th century. At its height, the town contained four hotels and several stores, mills, a carriage factory, a cheese factory, carpenters, cabinet-makers, saddlers, tanners, shoemakers, tailors, bakers, tinsmiths and a fanning-mill maker. However, since the mills closed in the 1950s, the population of the town has decreased significantly.

While Samuel Clark's mills no longer exist, his house still stands, built in the rare stacked plank construction style. The date of construction is unknown but as it was the miller's house it is likely contemporary with the original mills of the 1820s. The house also contains three examples of the Rumford fireplace. Other historic buildings include:

- the old schoolhouse at the south end of town, featuring an 1857 bell from the Meneely Bell Foundry in the cupola
- Haydon's General Store - a limestone building at the main intersection. After Haydon retired this became Stedman's and then Hartman's General Store.
- the Williams House - an 1881 stately home built by Lorenzo Dow Williams after he returned from the California gold rush.
- between Camden East and Newburgh sits the Carscallen farmhouse, built about 1830, with distinctive arches fronting the verandah.

James M. Lawrence founded Harrowsmith magazine in Camden East in 1976; it was sold to Telemedia in 1988 and relocated to Toronto in the early 1990s. Lawrence also founded Equinox magazine and the publishing company Camden House Publishing Ltd in Camden East. The Harrowsmith headquarters was in the Williams house while Harrowsmith Bookstore was, for many years, located in the limestone building that used to be Haydon's General Store.

A tornado cut through the town in the mid afternoon of the 2nd of August 2020, damaging property, destroying dozens of trees, and ripping the roof off the former bank building that had been housing the daycare and post office.

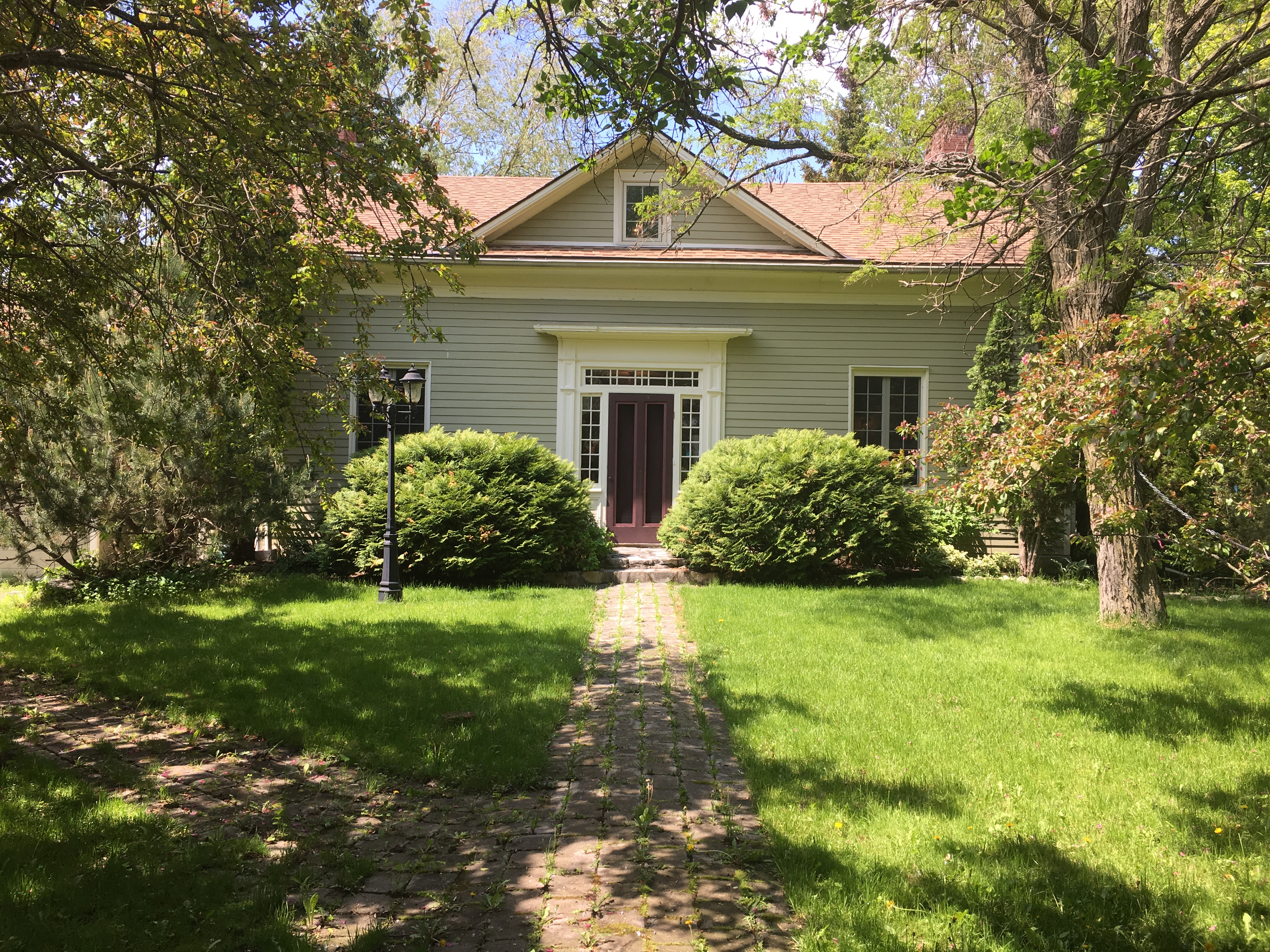
The home of Samuel Clark, for whom the village was originally named "Clark's Mills"

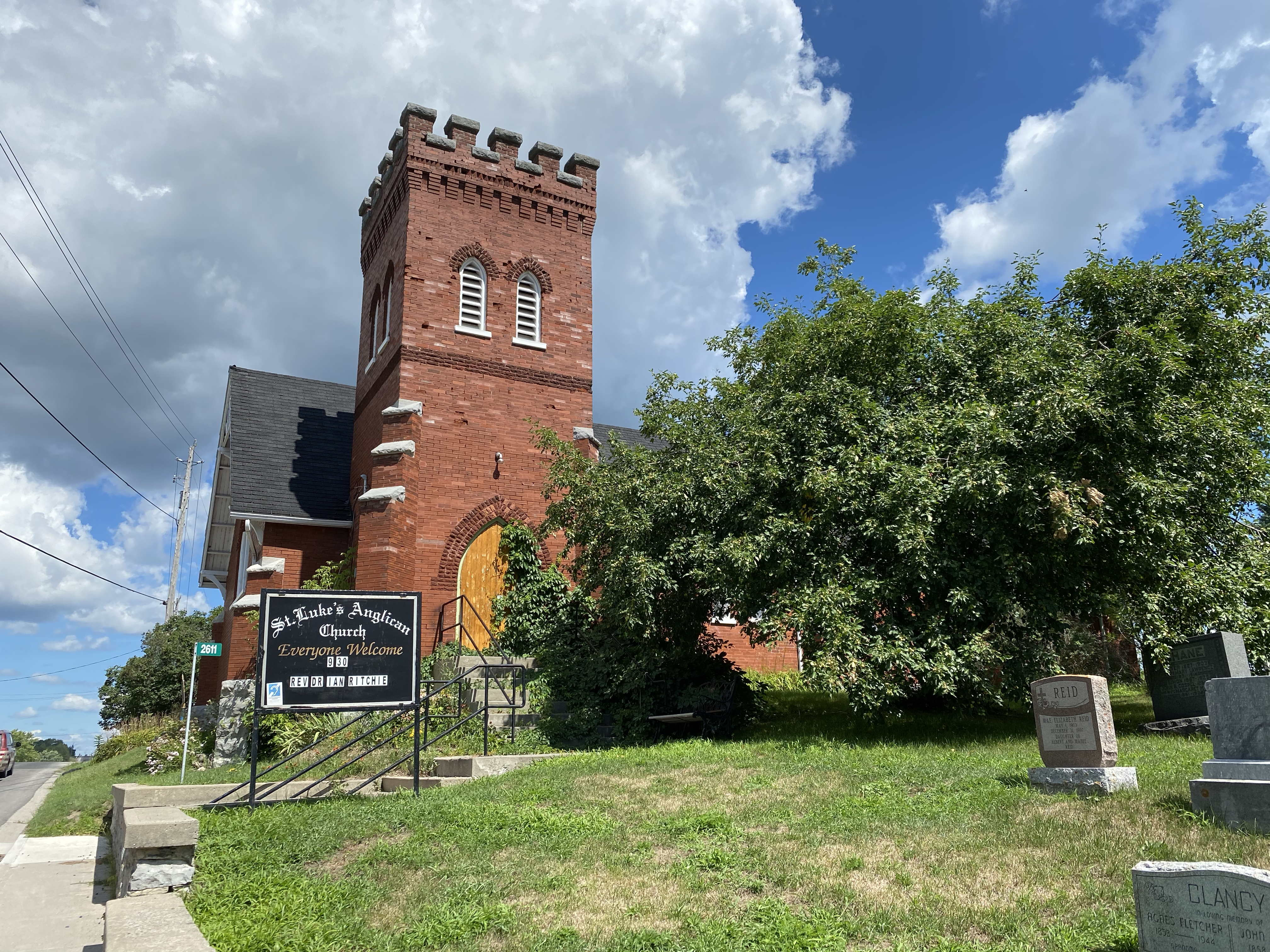
St. Luke's church, built in 1897

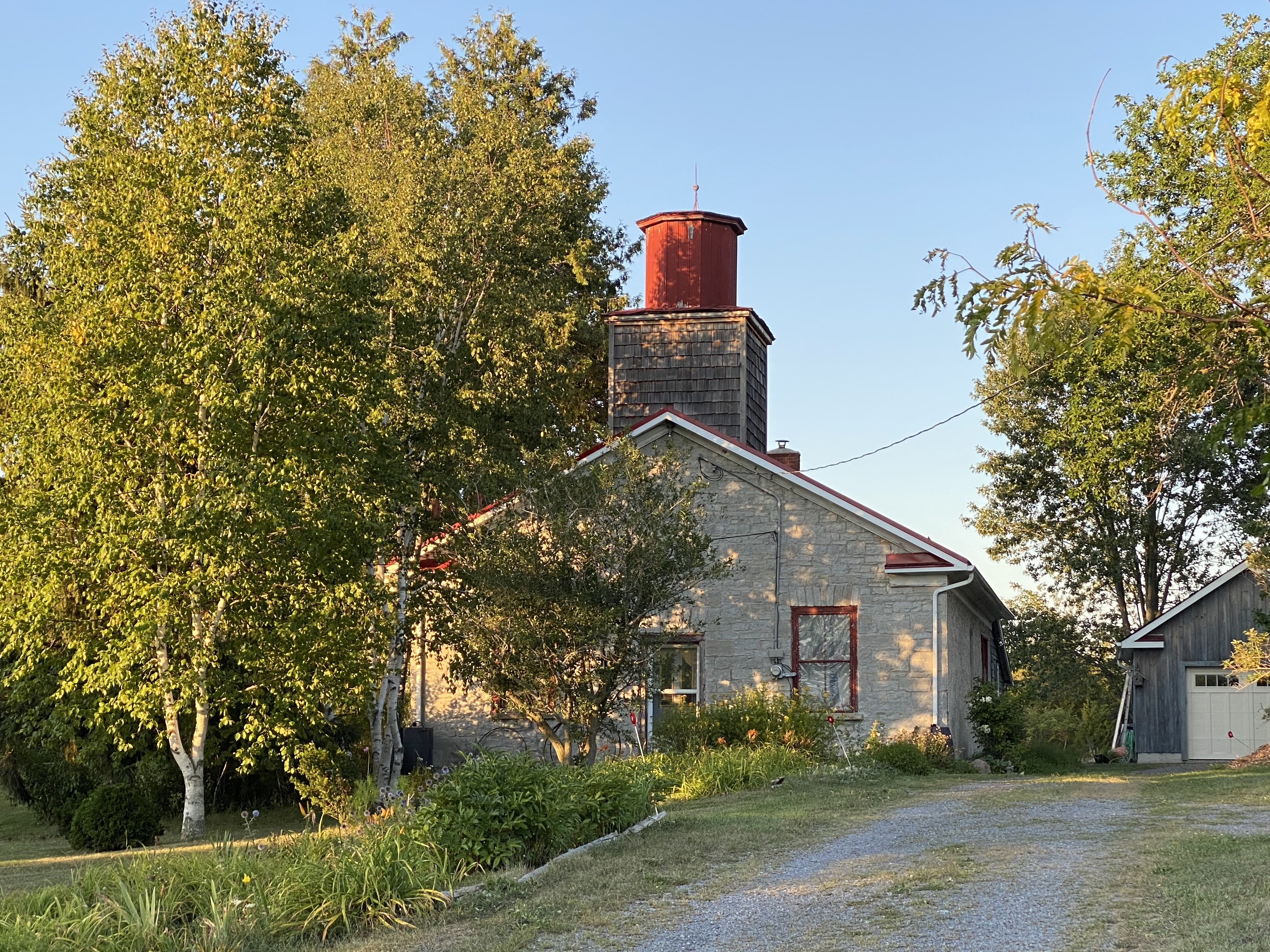
The schoolhouse that served Camden East from 1865-1963.

== Notable people ==
- Edmund John Glyn Hooper ran a general store in Camden East in 1855-1863 and later became an MP in the House of Commons of Canada (1878-1882) representing Lennox (federal electoral district). In 1882 he resigned his seat to allow Sir John A. Macdonald to represent that riding.
- Augustus Hooper, like his brother Edmund J. G. Hooper, was born in Devon and arrived in Canada West (now called Ontario) in 1843. Augustus represented the region in the Legislative Assembly of the Province of Canada, the precursor to the House of Commons of Canada, from 1861-3.
- William and Hugh Saul, worked in Scotland and emigrated to Canada in 1854. They worked for the Canadian firm of Brassey to help build the Victoria Tubular bridge. They joined forces to created their own company called "Saul Brothers" (although they were first cousins) first in Odessa then Camden East. They are renowned for many structures they have built.
- Sir Gilbert Parker was born in Camden East 23 November 1862. After serving as a clerk in Haydon's General Store as a teenager, he was a journalist in Australia, and then moved to England in 1889. He served as a member of parliament from 1900-1918 and gained considerable reputation writing historical novels. One of his best-known works is The Seats of the Mighty.
- Larry McCormick, Member of Parliament (MP) in the House of Commons of Canada (1993–2004) represented the electoral district of Hastings-Frontenac-Lennox and Addington. He was Parliamentary Secretary to the Minister of Agriculture and Agri-Food.
