= Uriah Wilson =

Canadian politician (1841–1918)

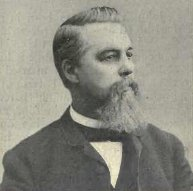

Member of the Canadian Parliament for Lennox
- In office 1887–1891
- Preceded by: Matthew William Pruyn
- Succeeded by: David Wright Allison
- In office 1892–1904
- Preceded by: David Wright Allison
- Succeeded by: District was abolished in 1903

Member of the Canadian Parliament for Lennox and Addington
- In office 1904–1911
- Preceded by: District was created in 1903
- Succeeded by: William James Paul

Personal details
- Born: 17 March 1841 North Fredericksburg Township, Canada West
- Died: 2 February 1918 (aged 76) Napanee, Ontario, Canada
- Party: Conservative

Uriah Wilson (17 March 1841 – 2 February 1918) was a Canadian politician.

Born in the Township of North Fredericksburg, Lennox and Addington County, Ontario, his father James Wilson was a native of England and his mother came from County Tyrone, Ireland. Wilson was educated at the public school in Napanee, Ontario. He married Mary Moyle in 1867. A merchant, he represented Centre Ward in the Town Council in 1875, 1876 and 1878, and was Deputy Reeve of Napanee from 1879 to 1882. He was warden of the County of Lennox and Addington in 1882 and reeve of Napanee in 1884 and 1885, and Mayor in 1886.

He was first elected to the House of Commons of Canada for Lennox at the general elections of 1887. A Conservative, he was defeated at the general elections of 1891, but was returned at a by-election held in 1892 after the election was declared void. He was re-elected in 1896, 1900, 1904, and 1908. He did not run in 1911.
