= James Reid (Ontario politician) =

Canadian politician

Ontario MPP
- In office 1890–1904
- Preceded by: John Miller
- Succeeded by: William James Paul
- Constituency: Addington

Personal details
- Born: September 14, 1848 Camden Township, Canada West
- Died: June 18, 1926 (aged 77) Napanee, Ontario
- Party: Conservative
- Spouse: Elizabeth Harkness

James Reid (September 14, 1848 – June 18, 1926) was an Ontario farmer and political figure. He represented Addington in the Legislative Assembly of Ontario as a Conservative member from 1890 to 1904.

He was born in Camden Township, Canada West, in 1848, the son of Irish immigrants and was educated there. In 1877, he married Elizabeth Harkness. Reid was a member of the council for Camden, serving as reeve and warden for Lennox and Addington Counties. He lived near Centreville.

== Election results ==
1890 Ontario general election: Addington
| Party | Candidate | Votes | % | ±% |
|---|---|---|---|---|
| Conservative | James Reid | 1,498 | 51.5 | -1.9 |
| Liberal | Frank Halliday | 1,412 | 48.5 | +1.9 |
| Total valid votes | | 2,910 | | |

1894 Ontario general election: Addington
| Party | Candidate | Votes | % | ±% |
|---|---|---|---|---|
| Conservative | James Reid | 1,849 | 56.7 | +5.2 |
| Liberal | Frank Halliday | 1,647 | 43.3 | -5.2 |
| Total valid votes | | 3,496 | | |

1898 Ontario general election: Addington
| Party | Candidate | Votes | % | ±% |
|---|---|---|---|---|
| Conservative | James Reid | 1,901 | 54.3 | -2.4 |
| Liberal | C.H. Wartman | 1,600 | 45.7 | +2.4 |
| Total valid votes | | 3,501 | | |
