= Hammel Madden Deroche =

Canadian politician

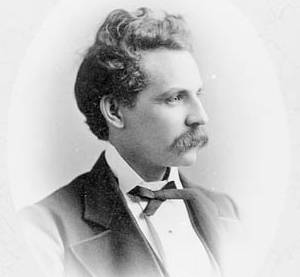

Ontario MPP
- In office 1871–1883
- Preceded by: Edmund John Glyn Hooper
- Succeeded by: George Denison
- Constituency: Addington

Personal details
- Born: August 27, 1840 Newburgh, Upper Canada
- Died: March 10, 1916 (aged 75) Napanee, Ontario
- Party: Liberal
- Spouse: Sarah Ann Christian Pile
- Profession: Lawyer

Military service
- Allegiance: Canadian
- Years of service: 1866-1868
- Unit: Queen's Own Rifles
- Battles/wars: Battle of Ridgeway

Hammel Madden Deroche, KC (August 27, 1840 – March 10, 1916) was an Ontario (Canada) lawyer and political figure. He represented Addington in the Legislative Assembly of Ontario as a Liberal member from 1871 to 1883.

He was born in Newburgh in Upper Canada in 1840, the son of Pascal Deroche, and graduated from the University of Toronto in 1868. During that time, he served with the Queen's Own Rifles and fought against the Fenians at the Battle of Ridgeway. He taught school at Newburgh and Napanee. He also served as inspector of schools for Napanee.

Deroche went on to study law, articling with James Bethune, and was called to the bar in 1874. He practiced law in partnership with Judge Madden. In 1872, he married Sarah Ann Christian Pile. He was named Queen's Counsel in 1890. In 1899, Deroche was appointed crown attorney for the county.

He was a Freemason and a member of the Church of England. He died in Napanee in 1916.

== Election results ==
1871 Ontario general election: Addington
Party	Candidate	Votes	%	±%
Liberal	Hammel Madden Deroche	809	50.82	+24.68
Conservative	Edmund John Glyn Hooper	783	49.18	−24.54
Turnout		1,592	59.31	−16.63
Eligible voters		2,684		
Liberal gain from Conservative		Swing		+24.61
Source: Elections Ontario

1875 Ontario general election: Addington
Party	Candidate	Votes	%	±%
Liberal	Hammel Madden Deroche	1,453	60.77	+9.95
Conservative	G. Lake	938	39.23	−9.95
Turnout		2,391	67.91	+8.59
Eligible voters		3,521		
Liberal hold		Swing		+9.95
Source: Elections Ontario

1879 Ontario general election: Addington
Party	Candidate	Votes	%	±%
Liberal	Hammel Madden Deroche	1,531	50.75	−10.02
Conservative	George Denison	1,486	49.25	+10.02
Total valid votes		3,017	66.76	−1.14
Eligible voters		4,519		
Liberal hold		Swing		−10.02
Source: Elections Ontario

1883 Ontario general election: Addington
Party	Candidate	Votes	%	±%
Conservative	George Denison	1,739	52.8	+3.5
Liberal	H.M. Deroche	1,556	49.2	-1.5
Total valid votes		3,295		

1886 Ontario general election: Addington
Party	Candidate	Votes	%	±%
Conservative	J.S. Miller	1,712	53.4	+0.6
Liberal	H.M. Deroche	1,493	46.6	-2.6
Total valid votes		3,205		
