= Napanee River =

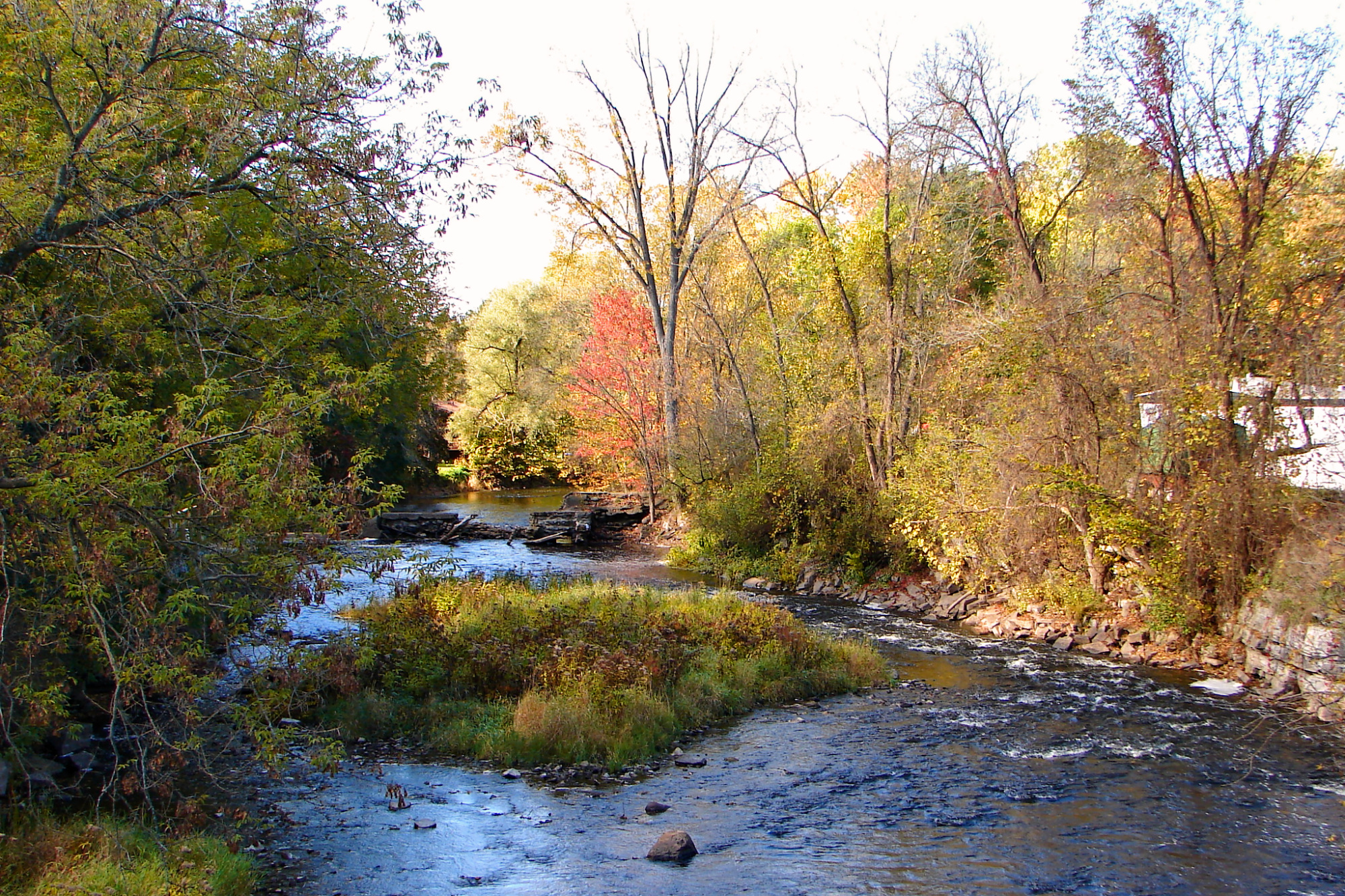

- Location of the mouth of the Napanee River in southern Ontario

Location
- Country: Canada
- Province: Ontario
- Region: Eastern Ontario
- Counties: Lennox and Addington; Frontenac

Physical characteristics
- Source: Camden Lake
  - location: Stone Mills, Lennox and Addington County
  - coordinates: 44°26′34″N 76°50′52″W
  - elevation: 146 m (479 ft)
- Mouth: Lake Ontario
  - location: Greater Napanee, Lennox and Addington County
  - coordinates: 44°11′44″N 77°01′19″W
  - elevation: 74 m (243 ft)

Basin features
- River system: Great Lakes Basin
- Tributaries
  - left: Depot Creek

Napanee River Falls located at Greater Napanee's Springside Park

The Napanee River is a river in Lennox and Addington County and Frontenac County in Eastern Ontario, Canada. It is in the Great Lakes Basin and flows from its source at Camden Lake to its mouth at the Bay of Quinte on Lake Ontario at Napanee. It flows through a valley of preglacial origin. The valley of the Napanee is lined with settlements such as Greater Napanee, Newburgh, Camden East, Yarker, and Petworth.

This river was originally called the Appanea. A grist mill was constructed on the river in 1785 near the current site of the town of Greater Napanee. Other mills were added at Yarker and Camden East.

== Tributaries ==
- Varty Creek (right)
- Napanee Lake
  - Watson Creek (left)
  - Hardwood Creek (left)
- Depot Creek (left)
- Whitman Creek (left)
- Carman Creek (left)

== See also ==
- List of Ontario rivers

== Sources ==
- Map 6 (PDF) (Map). 1 : 700,000. Official road map of Ontario. Ministry of Transportation of Ontario. 2014.
- Restructured municipalities - Ontario map #5 (Map). Restructuring Maps of Ontario. Ontario Ministry of Municipal Affairs and Housing. 2006. Archived from the original on 2020-05-11.
