= Edmund Hooper =

Edmund Hooper may refer to:

- Edmund Hooper (organist) (c. 1553–1621), early English composer and organist
- Edmund John Glyn Hooper (1818–1889), Canadian lumber merchant and political figure
