= Augustus Hooper =

Augustus Frederick Garland Hooper (1814-December 30, 1866) was a merchant, timber dealer and political figure in Canada West.

He was born in Devonshire, England in 1814 and came to Quebec City with his family in 1819. In 1843, he moved to Newburgh and established the firm A & D Hooper with his brother, Douglas. In 1861, he was elected to the 7th Parliament of the Province of Canada, representing the Counties of Lennox & Addington. He had been reeve in Camden Township, and became warden for Lennox and Addington in 1866. He died in the same year while still in office.

His brother Edmund represented Lennox in the House of Commons of Canada.
