= Stone Mills =

- Township (lower-tier)
- Township of Stone Mills
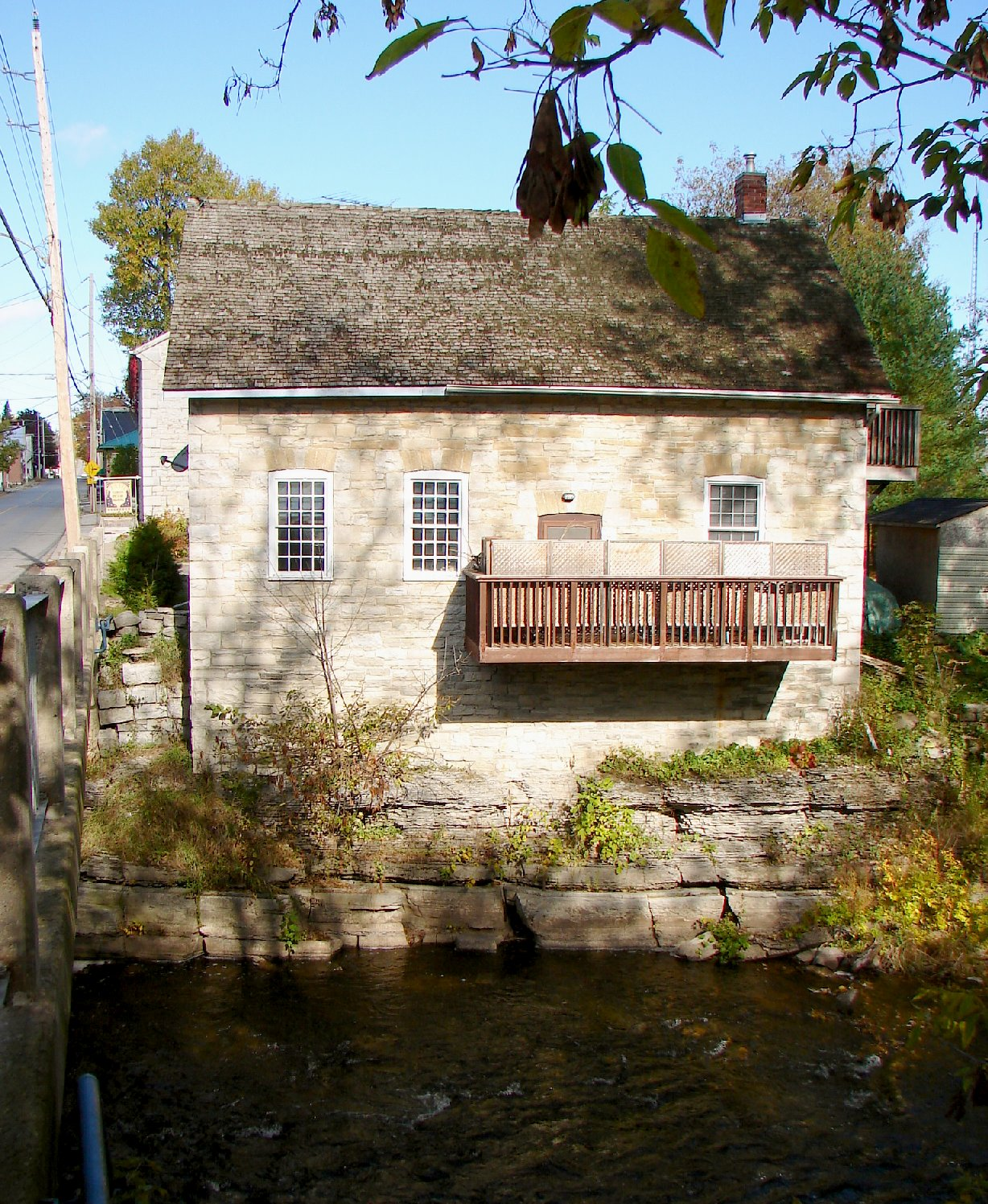
- Old mill in Newburgh

- Location within Southern Ontario
- Coordinates: 44°27′N 76°55′W
- Country: Canada
- Province: Ontario
- County: Lennox and Addington
- Incorporated: 1998

Government
  - Type: Township
  - Reeve: John Wise
  - Governing Body: Corporation of the Township of Stone Mills
  - MP: Shelby Kramp-Neuman
  - MPP: Ric Bresee

Area
  - Land: 693.71 km^{2} (267.84 sq mi)

Population (2021)
  - Total: 7,826
  - Density: 11.3/km^{2} (29/sq mi)
- Time zone: UTC-5 (EST)
  - Summer (DST): UTC-4 (EDT)
- Postal code: K0K 1N0
- Area codes: 613, 343
- Website: www.stonemills.com

Stone Mills is a lower-tier township north of Greater Napanee in Lennox and Addington County, Ontario, Canada. According to the 2021 census, the township has a population of 7,826.

The Township of Stone Mills was formed on January 1, 1998, through the amalgamation of the Village of Newburgh, the Township of Camden, and the Township of Sheffield.

== Communities ==
The township of Stone Mills comprises the following communities and hamlets:

- Camden East Ward: Centreville, Camden East, Colebrook, Croydon, Enterprise, Moscow, Newburgh, Yarker; Chippewa, Curie Station, Desmond, Hinch, Milsap, Petworth (partially), Varty Lake, Wesley; Barrett, Lens, Reidville
- Sheffield Ward: Erinsville, Tamworth; Ballahack, Clareview, Gull Creek, Ingle, McGuire Settlement; Trafford

=== Camden East ===
Camden East (44°20′07″N 76°50′00″W) Formerly known as "Clark's Mills", Camden East grew up around the saw, grist and wool mills operated by Samuel Clark until 1866. Other local industry has included farming, paper mills (on the west side of the village), and publishing (see Harrowsmith Country Life).

=== Centreville ===
Centreville (44°24′25″N 76°54′17″W) is bisected by Lennox and Addington County Road 4. The Centreville Public School educates roughly 100 students in kindergarten to grade 8. A public fairgrounds, complete with a park and grandstand, showcases the annual Centreville Fair. The fair opens on the Friday of the Labour Day weekend, and closes by the next night. Centreville is also the location of the township's municipal offices.

Climate data for Centreville (1991–2020 normals, extremes 1985–2020)
Month	Jan	Feb	Mar	Apr	May	Jun	Jul	Aug	Sep	Oct	Nov	Dec	Year
Record high °C (°F)	12.5 (54.5)	15.0 (59.0)	27.5 (81.5)	30.5 (86.9)	34.0 (93.2)	35.0 (95.0)	38.0 (100.4)	36.5 (97.7)	34.5 (94.1)	27.5 (81.5)	21.5 (70.7)	18.0 (64.4)	38.0 (100.4)
Mean daily maximum °C (°F)	−2.9 (26.8)	−1.4 (29.5)	4.1 (39.4)	11.9 (53.4)	19.6 (67.3)	24.4 (75.9)	27.2 (81.0)	26.2 (79.2)	21.9 (71.4)	14.1 (57.4)	6.9 (44.4)	0.4 (32.7)	12.7 (54.9)
Daily mean °C (°F)	−7.7 (18.1)	−6.5 (20.3)	−1.4 (29.5)	6.3 (43.3)	13.4 (56.1)	18.4 (65.1)	21.1 (70.0)	20.1 (68.2)	15.9 (60.6)	9.0 (48.2)	2.3 (36.1)	−3.6 (25.5)	7.3 (45.1)
Mean daily minimum °C (°F)	−12.4 (9.7)	−11.6 (11.1)	−6.3 (20.7)	0.8 (33.4)	7.2 (45.0)	12.2 (54.0)	14.9 (58.8)	13.9 (57.0)	9.9 (49.8)	3.9 (39.0)	−1.7 (28.9)	−7.5 (18.5)	1.9 (35.4)
Record low °C (°F)	−37.0 (−34.6)	−31.0 (−23.8)	−28.0 (−18.4)	−13.5 (7.7)	−6.5 (20.3)	0.0 (32.0)	6.0 (42.8)	3.5 (38.3)	−4.0 (24.8)	−10.0 (14.0)	−21.0 (−5.8)	−35.5 (−31.9)	−37.0 (−34.6)
Average precipitation mm (inches)	85.6 (3.37)	60.5 (2.38)	65.0 (2.56)	88.3 (3.48)	84.3 (3.32)	90.3 (3.56)	67.8 (2.67)	74.8 (2.94)	100.1 (3.94)	96.4 (3.80)	88.0 (3.46)	82.8 (3.26)	983.8 (38.73)
Average rainfall mm (inches)	39.1 (1.54)	26.3 (1.04)	41.4 (1.63)	81.5 (3.21)	84.1 (3.31)	90.3 (3.56)	67.8 (2.67)	74.8 (2.94)	100.1 (3.94)	95.3 (3.75)	75.7 (2.98)	47.6 (1.87)	824.0 (32.44)
Average snowfall cm (inches)	45.2 (17.8)	34.2 (13.5)	23.9 (9.4)	6.8 (2.7)	0.2 (0.1)	0.0 (0.0)	0.0 (0.0)	0.0 (0.0)	0.0 (0.0)	1.1 (0.4)	11.5 (4.5)	35.2 (13.9)	158.0 (62.2)
Average precipitation days (≥ 0.2 mm)	17.1	13.0	13.7	14.0	14.6	13.5	11.8	12.3	12.7	15.2	14.8	16.3	169.0
Average rainy days (≥ 0.2 mm)	5.8	4.8	8.1	13.0	14.5	13.5	11.8	12.3	12.7	15.1	12.0	8.1	131.7
Average snowy days (≥ 0.2 cm)	13.2	9.9	7.6	2.4	0.15	0.0	0.0	0.0	0.0	0.44	3.8	10.4	48.0
Source: Environment Canada

=== Croydon ===
Croydon (44°25′15″N 76°58′42″W) is a farming community. In the early and mid-1900s, Croydon was a well-developed farming community that featured several hotels, a general store, a church, a post office, a schoolhouse, and a gristmill. Although business and industry are currently non-existent in Croydon, many of the original buildings have been renovated and are serving as family homes. The main attraction is the Salmon River, which runs through the heart of Croydon. The river is used for swimming, fishing, canoeing, and kayaking.

=== Erinsville ===
Erinsville (44°29′00″N 77°03′00″W) is located on Highway 41. It was founded by Irish settlers in the late 1800s. It is close to Beaver Lake (actually two lakes, Beaver Lake North and South) and is host to several small cottage communities. The Erinsville area is also surrounded by several family-operated farms. Largely due to its low population, Erinsville has only a few commercial business in operation. These include the Beaver Lake Variety and Gas Bar and the Lakeview Tavern and Restaurant. Several residents also run small businesses from home. Erinsville also is the site of the Church of the Assumption of the Blessed Virgin Mary, a Roman Catholic parish. Erinsville also had a train track, but it is now out of commission; a dark sky viewing area is located minutes north of Erinsville on highway 41.

=== Newburgh ===
Newburgh (44°19′30″N 76°52′40″W), formerly an incorporated village, retains the status of a designated place in the Canadian census data. It is situated on the Napanee River, and was first founded in 1822 by Benjamin Files and Wm. V. P. Detlor. It quickly became a thriving community and home to numerous mills. Two saw mills were first built along the river in 1822 and 1825, followed by a grist mill in 1828, two flour mills in 1840, an oatmeal mill in 1861, two carding mills and a woollen mill in 1864. Other businesses such as a tannery, two axe factories, a sash, blind and door factory, a hub and rake factory, three carriage and wagon shops and two cabinet factories were also established.

By 1865, Newburgh had a population of 11,200, but that population quickly declined. Railway lines bypassed the village and manufacturers were unable to move goods efficiently to and from Newburgh. The village did not get the Napanee, Tamworth and Quebec Railway line until 1884. Also, contributing to this decline were several major fires, the worst which happened in 1887 and destroyed eighty-four buildings in the centre of the village.

Today Newburgh has a clinic (Newburgh Clinic) run by two doctors, Newburgh Public School and Newburgh Post Office, Newburgh United Church, Newburgh Pharmacy, Newburgh L.C.B.O., a small grocery store and a gas station, Newburgh Abram's Bakery, Second Time Treasures by Louise, Clarke Art and Projects art gallery, and Rogues' Hollow Antiques, Ontario's two largest chicken farms, and other small businesses such as barber shops and hair salons. Newburgh also held an art show from 2004-2019 Art Among The Ruins'.

In the Canada 2011 Census, Newburgh had a population of 696, down from 725 in the 2006 census.

Ascension Blacklist Metalcore Band formed 2023 in Newburgh Ontario https://www.instagram.com/ascension_blacklist?igsh=MXZhbnVyaXU4M2d5Yw==

=== Tamworth ===
Tamworth (44°29′15″N 76°59′40″W) Tamworth is the largest community in the former Sheffield Township of less than 1600 people. It was featured in Michael Ondaatje’s In the Skin of a Lion.

== Demographics ==
In the 2021 Census of Population conducted by Statistics Canada, Stone Mills had a population of 7,826 living in 3,071 of its 3,436 total private dwellings, a change of 1.6% from its 2016 population of 7,702. With a land area of 693.71 km^{2} (267.84 sq mi), it had a population density of 11.3/km^{2} (29.2/sq mi) in 2021.

Canada census – Stone Mills community profile

	2021	2016	2011
Population	7,826 (+1.6% from 2016)	7,702 (+1.9% from 2011)	7,560 (-0.1% from 2006)
Land area	693.71 km^{2} (267.84 sq mi)	709.17 km^{2} (273.81 sq mi)	708.83 km^{2} (273.68 sq mi)
Population density	11.3/km^{2} (29/sq mi)	10.9/km^{2} (28/sq mi)	10.7/km^{2} (28/sq mi)
Median age	46.8 (M: 46.8, F: 47.2)	46.0 (M: 45.9, F: 46.0)	43.5 (M: 43.7, F: 43.2)
Private dwellings	3,436 (total) 3,071 (occupied)	3,440 (total)	3,169 (total)
Median household income	$91,000	$77,520	$70,028

References: 2021 2016 2011

Historical census populations

Year	Pop.	±%
1976	5,668	—
1981	5,514	−2.7%
1986	5,715	+3.6%
1991	6,656	+16.5%
1996	7,229	+8.6%

Year	Pop.	±%
2001	7,337	+1.5%
2006	7,568	+3.1%
2011	7,560	−0.1%
2016	7,702	+1.9%
2021	7,826	+1.6%

Population amounts prior to 1998 are sum of Camden East Township, Sheffield Township, and Newburgh Village.
Source: Statistics Canada:

== Education ==
Limestone District School Board operates an Enterprise school, a Tamworth school, a Centerville school and a Newburgh school, as well as a Catholic school in Erinsville

== Notable people ==
- Hammel Madden Deroche, lawyer and political figure from Newburgh
- Manly Benson, Methodist minister and lecturer from Newburgh
- Robert Fulford Ruttan, chemist, university professor and administrator from Newburgh
- Weston Price, dentist, nutritionist, and author from Newburgh
- Sir Allen Bristol Aylesworth, Minister of Labour, Minister of Justice and Canadian senator from Newburgh
- Sir Gilbert Parker was born in Camden East 23 November 1862. After serving as a clerk in Haydon's General Store as a teenager, he was a journalist in Australia, and then moved to England in 1889. He served as a member of parliament from 1900-1918 and gained considerable reputation writing historical novels. One of his best-known works is The Seats of the Mighty.
- Larry McCormick, storekeeper and resident of Camden East, was a Member of Parliament (MP) in the House of Commons of Canada (1993–2004) representing the electoral district of Hastings-Frontenac-Lennox and Addington. He was Parliamentary Secretary to the Minister of Agriculture and Agri-Food.

== See also ==
- List of townships in Ontario
