= Robert Fulford Ruttan =

- Born: July 15, 1856; Newburgh, Canada West
- Died: February 19, 1930 (aged 73); Montreal, Quebec, Canada
- Occupations: Professor of organic and biological chemistry; Administrator
- Known for: Contributions to medical chemistry

Robert Fulford Ruttan, FRSC (July 15, 1856 – February 19, 1930) was a Canadian chemist and university professor.

== Biography ==
Born in Newburgh, Canada West, the son of Dr. Allan Ruttan, a physician, and Caroline Smith, Ruttan's family moved to Napanee around 1863. He received a Bachelor of Arts in natural science degree in 1881 from the University of Toronto. He received his M.D. in 1884 from McGill University, where he also participated in the establishment of the zeta psi fraternity. He never practiced medicine, but rather did postgraduate studies in organic chemistry with August Wilhelm von Hofmann at the University of Berlin.

Returning to Canada in 1886, he was appointed a lecturer in chemistry in the faculty of medicine at McGill. In 1891, he became professor. In 1912, he became director of McGill's newly unified chemistry program, a position he occupied until 1928. He was dean of graduate studies and research from 1924 to 1928.

In 1896, he was made a Fellow of the Royal Society of Canada and served as its president from 1919 to 1920. In 1920, he helped found the Canadian Institute of Chemistry.

A cricketer, yachtsman, and golfer, Ruttan was president of the Royal Canadian Golf Association in 1907. In 1906, he served on Canada’s first national Olympic organization, the Central Olympic Committee.

In 1914, he was awarded an honorary Doctor of Science degree by the University of Toronto.

He died in Montreal in 1930.

== Notes ==
Professional and academic associations
Preceded by Rodolphe Lemieux	President of the Royal Society of Canada; 1919-1920	Succeeded by Arthur Philemon Coleman
