= William James Paul =

Canadian politician

Member of Parliament for Lennox and Addington
- In office 1911–1921
- Preceded by: Uriah Wilson
- Succeeded by: Edward James Sexsmith

Ontario MPP
- In office 1905–1911
- Preceded by: James Reid
- Succeeded by: William Black
- Constituency: Addington

Personal details
- Born: July 9, 1854 Camden, Canada West
- Died: September 1, 1929 (aged 75) Ottawa, Ontario, Canada
- Political party: Conservative
- Occupation: Farmer

William James Paul (July 9, 1854 – September 1, 1929) was a Canadian politician who served in the Legislative Assembly of Ontario, 1905–1911, and in the House of Commons, 1911–1921. He was a member of the Conservative Party for most of his life.

Born July 9, 1854, in Camden, Canada West, William was the first born of seven sons, and one daughter. He was educated exclusively in the common schools of Camden and Sheffield.

Before entering politics, W. J. Paul worked as a farmer, and within both the lumber industry and the cheese industry. He began his political career in the Sheffield township council where he served as reeve or commissioner for approximately ten years.

In 1905, he was elected by a significant majority to the Legislative Assembly of Ontario as representative for the riding of Addington. So popular was his candidacy that in the general election of 1908 he was returned to office without opposition. As a member of the Provincial House, he served on a variety of Standing Committees, including Agriculture and Colonization, Standing Orders, and Privileges and Elections.

He was elected to the House of Commons for the riding of Lennox and Addington on November 15, 1911, to serve in the Conservative Caucus. He continued on as a Conservative MP until the Conscription Crisis of 1917, when he joined with the newly formed Unionist Party. He was elected to serve in the Unionist Caucus on March 18, 1918, and finished his final term in the House of Commons on October 4, 1921.

Paul died September 1, 1929, in Ottawa, Ontario, Canada.
