= Pruyn =

Pruyn is a surname. Notable people with the surname include:

- John V. L. Pruyn (1811–1877), American politician
- Matthew William Pruyn (1822–1898), Canadian merchant and politician
- Robert C. Pruyn (1847–1934), American inventor, banker, businessman and politician
- Robert H. Pruyn (1815-1882), American lawyer, militia general, diplomat and politician
