= John Stewart Miller =

Canadian politician

Ontario MPP
- In office 1886–1890
- Preceded by: George Denison
- Succeeded by: James Reid
- Constituency: Addington

Personal details
- Born: September 17, 1844 Camden Township, Addington County, Canada West
- Died: April 25, 1936 (aged 91) West St. Paul, Manitoba
- Party: Conservative
- Spouse: Carrie Hawley
- Occupation: Businessman

John Stewart Miller (September 17, 1844 – April 25, 1936) was an Ontario farmer, merchant and political figure. He represented Addington in the Legislative Assembly of Ontario as a Conservative member from 1886 to 1890.

He was born in Camden Township, Addington County, Canada West in 1844, the son of Thomas Miller and Christina Madden. He studied at the Ontario Commercial College in Belleville. Miller was a lieutenant in the local militia. In 1870, he started a cheese factory in Centreville with James N. Lapum. He was named clerk for Camden Township in 1875. In 1871, he married Carrie Hawley but she died three years later. He subsequently married Anne Robertson in 1877. In 1883, Miller became a merchant in Centreville, purchasing the business of A. N. Lapum. He was county master for the Orange Lodge and master of the local Masonic lodge. He moved to Manitou, Manitoba in 1890 and returned to farming. Miller served as reeve for Pembina, Manitoba from 1895 to 1897. He died on April 25, 1936.
