= William Black (Ontario politician) =

Canadian politician, died 1944

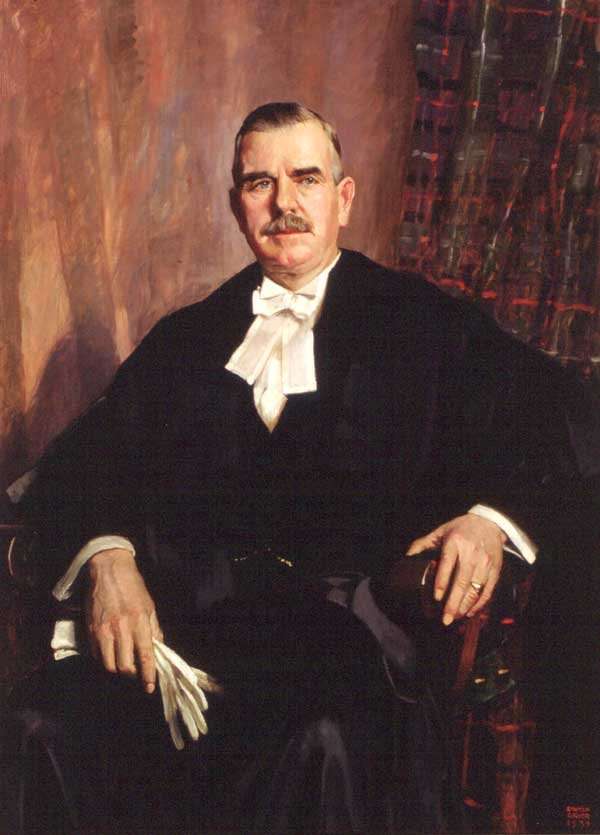
- Portrait by Edmund Wyly Grier, c. 1930

Ontario MPP
- In office 1911–1943
- Preceded by: William James Paul
- Succeeded by: John Pringle
- Constituency: Addington

Personal details
- Born: October 17, 1867 Dundas County, Ontario
- Died: October 24, 1944 (aged 77) Ottawa, Ontario
- Party: Conservative
- Spouse: Georgia R. Griffith
- Occupation: Railway trackman

William David Black (October 17, 1867 – October 24, 1944) was speaker of the Legislature of Ontario from 1927 to 1929 and served as Conservative MLA for Addington from 1911 to 1943.

He was born in Dundas County, Ontario, the son of William Black. After leaving the family farm, Black worked as a trackman for the Canadian Pacific Railway. In 1892, he married Georgia R. Griffith. Black moved to Parham in 1894, where he operated a general store and worked as a contractor. He was also involved in lumbering and contracting in the Temagami region. Black served on the municipal council for Parham and was a justice of the peace and an issuer of marriage licenses. He also served as secretary-treasurer of the Agricultural Society.

He retired from politics in 1943 due to health problems. Black died in Ottawa the following year at the age of 77.
