= Lennox and Addington =

Former federal electoral district in Ontario, Canada

Coordinates: 44.67°N 77.17°W

Ontario electoral district

Defunct federal electoral district
- Legislature: House of Commons
- District created: 1903
- District abolished: 1924
- First contested: 1904
- Last contested: 1921

Lennox and Addington was a federal electoral district represented in the House of Commons of Canada from 1904 to 1925. It was located in the province of Ontario. This riding was first created in 1903 from Addington and Lennox ridings. It consisted of the county of Lennox and Addington.

The electoral district was abolished in 1924 when it was redistributed between Frontenac—Addington and Prince Edward—Lennox ridings.

== Members of Parliament ==
This riding has elected the following members of Parliament:

Parliament	Years	Member	Party
Riding created from Addington and Lennox
10th	1904–1908	Uriah Wilson	Conservative
11th	1908–1911	Uriah Wilson	Conservative
12th	1911–1917	William James Paul	Conservative
13th	1917–1921	William James Paul	Government (Unionist)
14th	1921–1925	Edward James Sexsmith	Progressive
Riding dissolved into Frontenac—Addington and Prince Edward—Lennox

== Election history ==
1904 Canadian federal election
Party	Candidate	Votes
Conservative	Uriah Wilson	2,650
Liberal	Hiram Keech	2,161

1908 Canadian federal election
Party	Candidate	Votes
Conservative	Uriah Wilson	2,452
Liberal	Franklin Secord Wartman	2,298

1911 Canadian federal election
Party	Candidate	Votes
Conservative	William James Paul	2,580
Liberal	John Perry Vrooman	1,994

1917 Canadian federal election
Party	Candidate	Votes
Government (Unionist)	William James Paul	3,477
Opposition (Laurier Liberals)	Edward Wilkinson Grange	1,895

1921 Canadian federal election
Party	Candidate	Votes
Progressive	Edward James Sexsmith	4,735
Conservative	Archibald Brisco Carscallen	4,606

== See also ==
- List of Canadian electoral districts
- Historical federal electoral districts of Canada
