= Edmund John Glyn Hooper =

Canadian politician

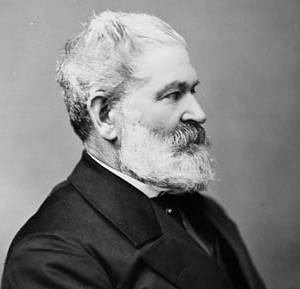

Member of Parliament for Lennox
- In office 1878–1882
- Preceded by: Richard John Cartwright
- Succeeded by: John A. Macdonald

Ontario MPP
- In office 1867–1871
- Preceded by: Riding established
- Succeeded by: Hammel Madden Deroche
- Constituency: Addington

Personal details
- Born: July 7, 1818 Devonshire, England
- Died: October 5, 1889 (aged 71) Napanee, Ontario
- Party: Liberal-Conservative
- Occupation: Lumber merchant

Military service
- Allegiance: Canadian
- Years of service: 1837
- Unit: Militia
- Battles/wars: Lower Canada Rebellion

Edmund John Glyn Hooper (July 7, 1818 – October 5, 1889) was a Canadian businessman and political figure. He represented Addington in the 1st Parliament of Ontario and Lennox in the House of Commons of Canada as a Liberal-Conservative member from 1879 to 1882.

He was born in Devonshire, England in 1818 and came to Quebec City with his parents in 1819. He served in the local militia during the Lower Canada Rebellion. In 1843, he moved to Lennox County and established himself as a lumber merchant with his brother Augustus. He built a sawmill in Frontenac County which burned down in 1855. He then set up a store in Camden East; he moved to Napanee in 1863 and opened another store there. In the same year, he was appointed treasurer for the provisional council of the Counties of Lennox and Addington. In 1879, he was forced to resign from his position as treasurer when funds were found to be missing; Hooper declared bankruptcy because he was declared indebted to the county.

He died in Napanee in 1889.

== Electoral history ==
1878 Canadian federal election
Party	Candidate	Votes
Liberal–Conservative	Edmund John Glyn Hooper	1,358
Liberal	Richard John Cartwright	1,299

1871 Ontario general election: Addington
Party	Candidate	Votes	%	±%
Liberal	Hammel Madden Deroche	809	50.82	+24.68
Conservative	Edmund John Glyn Hooper	783	49.18	−24.54
Turnout		1,592	59.31	−16.63
Eligible voters		2,684		
Liberal gain from Conservative		Swing		+24.61
Source: Elections Ontario

1867 Ontario general election: Addington
Party	Candidate	Votes	%
Conservative	Edmund John Glyn Hooper	1,554	73.72
Liberal	Mr. Joyner	551	26.14
Independent	B.C. Davy	3	0.14
Total valid votes		2,108	75.94
Eligible voters		2,776	
Conservative pickup new district.			
Source: Elections Ontario
