= David Wright Allison =

Canadian politician

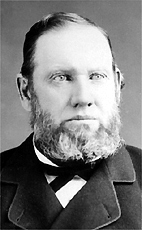

Member of Parliament for Lennox
- In office 1883–1885
- Preceded by: Rt. Hon. Sir John A. Macdonald
- Succeeded by: Matthew William Pruyn
- In office 1891–1892
- Preceded by: Uriah Wilson
- Succeeded by: Uriah Wilson

Personal details
- Born: 1826 Adolphustown, Upper Canada
- Died: May 15, 1906 (aged 79–80)
- Party: Liberal
- Profession: farmer, manufacturer, speculator

David Wright Allison (1826 in Adolphustown, Upper Canada – May 15, 1906) was a Canadian politician, farmer, manufacturer, and speculator. He was elected to the House of Commons of Canada as a Liberal in an 1883 by-election representing the riding of Lennox. He was later elected to Lennox as a Liberal in 1891. He also ran for election as an independent for Lennox in the elections of 1882, by-election of 1885, 1887 and by-election of 1892.
