= John Gibbard =

John Gibbard founded the Gibbard Furniture Company in Greater Napanee, Ontario, in 1835. The company operated for 173 years and was the oldest furniture maker in Canada and one of the oldest continuously operating companies in North America at the time of its closing in 2010. Gibbard's furniture can be found in many Canadian embassies around the world.
