= Napanee District Secondary School =

Location
- 245 Belleville Road; Napanee, Ontario; Canada; 44.24917°N 76.9594°W

Information
- Motto: Hawks have character
- Founded: 1889
- School board: Limestone District
- Principal: Michael McDonald
- Colours: Gold; Blue
- Fight song: We rule, we rock, N D double S home of the hawk
- Team name: Golden Hawks
- Newspaper: The Hawk
- Yearbook: The Torch
- Website: Napanee District Secondary School

Napanee District Secondary School colloquially known as NDSS is a Canadian public, comprehensive school located in Napanee, Ontario, Canada. The town is in the Eastern Ontario county of Lennox and Addington approximately 40 kilometres west of the city of Kingston, Ontario. The school offers classes for students in grades nine through twelve and is a member school of the Limestone District School Board. The school motto is "Habit Crystalizes Into Character".

== History ==
The present building dates from 1952 with additions in the 1960s. The name dates from 1963, when it was changed from Napanee District Collegiate Institute.

== Sports ==
Napanee District Secondary School is the home of the Golden Hawks. Team colours are blue and gold. The Golden Hawks field teams in various sports including hockey, football, basketball, rugby, gymnastics, volleyball, curling, swimming and track. The Golden Hawks compete against high schools teams in the "Kingston Area Secondary Schools Athletic Association" (KASSAA).

== Notable alumni and former students ==
- Leroy Blugh, 1985: Former Canadian Football League defensive lineman who played fifteen seasons in the CFL including eleven seasons for the Edmonton Eskimos. Two-time CFL West Division All-Star, Grey Cup Champion (1993).
- Jason Boyes, 1994: 81st Canadian soldier killed in the War in Afghanistan. Boyes was a sergeant in the 2nd Battalion, Princess Patricia's Canadian Light Infantry, killed while on foot patrol in the volatile Panjwaii district of Kandahar province (March 16, 2008).
- Michael Breaugh, 1959: Member of Parliament (MP) in the House of Commons of Canada (1990–1993) representing the electoral district of Oshawa. Prior to that Breaugh served as Member of the Provincial Parliament (MPP) for Oshawa in the Legislative Assembly of Ontario (1975 to 1990).
- Brittany Benn,:Canadian rugby union player. She represented Canada at the 2014 Women's Rugby World Cup. She was a member of the touring squad that played France and England in November 2013.
- Avril Lavigne, 2000: Grammy nominated, multi-Juno and MTV Award winning pop/rock music star. Her debut album, Let Go has sold 20 million copies worldwide. She dropped out in the 11th grade to pursue her music career full-time.
- Ryan Malcolm, 1997: First winner of Canadian Idol (2003). His debut single "Something More" went multi-platinum in Canada and became a #1 pop music hit on the Canadian singles charts.
- Larry McCormick, 1958: Member of Parliament (MP) in the House of Commons of Canada (1993–2004) representing the electoral district of Hastings-Frontenac-Lennox and Addington. He was Parliamentary Secretary to the Minister of Agriculture and Agri-Food.
- Jeff Pearce (Canadian musician), 1985: Musician, songwriter and producer, founding member of Moist, two time Juno winner and recipient of 3 multi-platinum album awards and 6 Socan Number One awards. Co-writer of all twelve Moist singles, and of David Usher's international hit "Black Black Heart".
- Lesley Thompson, 1978: Four time Olympic medalist, including winner of an Olympic Gold Medal in the Women's Eights Rowing event in Barcelona, Spain, 1992.

== See also ==
- Education in Ontario
- List of secondary schools in Ontario
