= John Abbott Pringle =

Canadian politician

Ontario MPP
- In office 1943–1955
- Preceded by: William Black
- Succeeded by: Riding abolished
- Constituency: Addington

Personal details
- Born: May 4, 1892; Arden, Ontario
- Died: November 26, 1962 (aged 70); Kingston, Ontario
- Political party: Progressive Conservative
- Spouse: Flora Amelia Lee
- Occupation: Merchant, farmer

John Abbott Pringle (May 4, 1892 – November 26, 1962) was an Ontario farmer, merchant and political figure. He represented Addington in the Legislative Assembly of Ontario from 1943 to 1955 as a Progressive Conservative member.

He was born in Arden, Ontario, the son of William James Pringle. In 1919, he married Flora Amelia Lee. Pringle sold hardware and owned a farm. He served on the local school board and was its chairman for 6 years. He was a member of the Orange Order, the Masonic Order and a Shriner. He died suddenly after surgery for an unspecified illness in 1962.
