= Addington (provincial electoral district) =

Former electoral district of Ontario, Canada

Ontario electoral district

Defunct provincial electoral district
- Legislature: Legislative Assembly of Ontario
- District created: 1867
- District abolished: 1954
- First contested: 1867
- Last contested: 1951

Addington was a provincial electoral riding in Ontario, Canada. It was created in 1867 at the time of confederation and was abolished in 1954 before the 1955 election.

== Boundaries ==
In 1867, the boundaries included the Townships of Camden, Portland, Sheffield, Hinchinbrooke, Kaladar, Kennebec, Olden, Oso, Anglesea, Barrie, Clarendon, Palmerston, Effingham, Abinger, Miller, Canonto, Denbigh, Loughborough and Bedford.

In 1885, the boundaries were changed to include the Townships of Abinger, Anglesea, Ashby, Camden, Denbigh, Effingham, Kaladar, Sheffield, and the Village of Newburgh in Lennox and Addington County, and the townships of Barrie, North Canonto, South Canonto, Clarendon, Hinchinbrooke, Kennebec, Loughborough, Miller, Olden, Oso, Palmerston and Portland in Frontenac County.

In 1925, the boundaries were changed to include the Townships of Abinger, Anglesea, Ashby, Camden, Denbigh, Effingham, Kaladar, Sheffield and the Village of Newburgh in the County of Lennox aud Addington and the Townships of Barrie, Bedford, North Canonto, South Canonto, Clarendon, Hinchinbrooke, Kennebec, Loughborough, Pittsburg, Miller, Olden, Oso, Palmerston and Portland in the County of Frontenac.

== Members of Provincial Parliament ==
Addington
Assembly	Years	Member	Party
1st	1867–1871	Edmund John Glyn Hooper	Liberal–Conservative
2nd	1871–1875	Hammel Madden Deroche	Liberal
3rd	1875–1879	Hammel Madden Deroche	Liberal
4th	1879–1883	Hammel Madden Deroche	Liberal
5th	1883–1886	George Denison	Conservative
6th	1886–1890	John Stewart Miller	Conservative
7th	1890–1894	James Reid	Conservative
8th	1894–1898	James Reid	Conservative
9th	1898–1902	James Reid	Conservative
10th	1902–1905	James Reid	Conservative
11th	1905–1908	William James Paul	Conservative
12th	1908–1911	William James Paul	Conservative
13th	1911–1914	William Black	Conservative
14th	1914–1919	William Black	Conservative
15th	1919–1923	William Black	Conservative
16th	1923–1926	William Black	Conservative
17th	1926–1929	William Black	Conservative
18th	1929–1934	William Black	Conservative
19th	1934–1937	William Black	Conservative
20th	1937–1943	William Black	Progressive Conservative
21st	1943–1945	John Abbott Pringle	Progressive Conservative
22nd	1945–1948	John Abbott Pringle	Progressive Conservative
23rd	1948–1951	John Abbott Pringle	Progressive Conservative
24th	1951–1955	John Abbott Pringle	Progressive Conservative
Sourced from the Ontario Legislative Assembly
Merged into Frontenac—Addington for the 1955 election

== Election results ==
1951 Ontario general election
Party	Candidate	Votes	%	±%
Progressive Conservative	John Abbott Pringle	7,035	56.04	+2.99
Liberal	Harold R. Wartman	4,707	37.50	–0.12
Co-operative Commonwealth	Eldon Leslie Fowlie	811	6.46	–2.87
Total valid votes		12,553	99.01	
Total rejected ballots		126	0.99	+0.20
Turnout		12,679	73.35	+3.34
Eligible voters		17,285		
Progressive Conservative hold		Swing		+1.55
Source: Elections Ontario

1948 Ontario general election
Party	Candidate	Votes	%	±%
Progressive Conservative	John Abbott Pringle	6,497	53.05	–1.09
Liberal	James Dawe	4,606	37.61	–0.17
Co-operative Commonwealth	A. Earl Wagar	1,143	9.33	+1.26
Total valid votes		12,246	99.21	
Total rejected ballots		98	0.79	+0.09
Turnout		12,344	70.02	–9.40
Eligible voters		17,630		
Progressive Conservative hold		Swing		–0.92
Source: Elections Ontario

1945 Ontario general election
Party	Candidate	Votes	%	±%
Progressive Conservative	John Abbott Pringle	6,992	54.15	+2.78
Liberal	Hugh Wilson	4,879	37.78	+2.41
Co-operative Commonwealth	A. Earl Wagar	1,042	8.07	–5.19
Total valid votes		12,913	99.29	
Total rejected ballots		92	0.71	+0.14
Turnout		13,005	79.42	+6.65
Eligible voters		16,375		
Progressive Conservative hold		Swing		+0.19
Source: Elections Ontario

1943 Ontario general election
Party	Candidate	Votes	%	±%
Progressive Conservative	John Abbott Pringle	5,628	51.36	+0.55
Liberal	Thomas W. Warner	3,876	35.37	–13.81
Co-operative Commonwealth	John A. McMaster	1,453	13.26	–
Total valid votes		10,957	99.44	
Total rejected ballots		62	0.56	–0.19
Turnout		11,019	72.77	–11.40
Eligible voters		15,143		
Progressive Conservative gain from Conservative		Swing		+7.18
Source: Elections Ontario

1937 Ontario general election
Party	Candidate	Votes	%	±%
Conservative	William Black	7,146	50.82	–3.00
Liberal	Colin Campbell	6,916	49.18	+3.00
Total valid votes		14,062	99.25	
Total rejected ballots		106	0.75	+0.16
Turnout		14,168	84.16	+4.76
Eligible voters		16,834		
Conservative hold		Swing		–3.00
Source: Elections Ontario

1934 Ontario general election
Party	Candidate	Votes	%	±%
Conservative	William Black	7,223	53.81	–13.63
Liberal	Colin Campbell	6,199	46.19	+13.63
Total valid votes		13,422	99.41	
Total rejected ballots		79	0.59	–0.10
Turnout		13,501	79.40	+18.32
Eligible voters		17,003		
Conservative hold		Swing		–13.63
Source: Elections Ontario

1929 Ontario general election
Party	Candidate	Votes	%	±%
Conservative	William Black	4,273	67.44	–
Liberal	George Anson Aylsworth	2,063	32.56	–
Total valid votes		6,336	99.31	
Total rejected ballots		44	0.69	–
Turnout		6,380	61.09	–
Eligible voters		10,444		
Conservative hold		Swing		+0.00
Source: Elections Ontario

1926 Ontario general election
Party	Candidate	Votes	
Conservative	William Black	acclaimed	
Conservative hold		Swing	–
Source: Elections Ontario

1923 Ontario general election
Party	Candidate	Votes	%	±%
Conservative	William Black	3,110	70.83	–
Liberal	William H. Haines	1,281	29.17	–
Total valid votes		4,391	98.92	
Total rejected ballots		48	1.08	–
Turnout		4,439	61.68	–
Eligible voters		7,197		
Conservative hold		Swing		+0.00
Source: Elections Ontario

1919 Ontario general election
Party	Candidate	Votes	
Conservative	William Black	acclaimed	
Conservative hold		Swing	–
Source: Elections Ontario

1914 Ontario general election
Party	Candidate	Votes	%	±%
Conservative	William Black	1,841	78.27	–
Temperance	John Benjamin Sanderson	511	21.73	–
Total valid votes		2,352	99.41	
Total rejected ballots		14	0.59	–
Turnout		2,366	71.18	–
Eligible voters		3,324		
Conservative hold		Swing		+0.00
Source: Elections Ontario

1911 Ontario general election
Party	Candidate	Votes	
Conservative	William Black	acclaimed	
Conservative hold		Swing	–
Source: Elections Ontario

1908 Ontario general election
Party	Candidate	Votes	
Conservative	William James Paul	acclaimed	
Conservative hold		Swing	–
Source: Elections Ontario

1905 Ontario general election
Party	Candidate	Votes	%	±%
Conservative	William James Paul	1,384	64.58	+4.44
Liberal	Hiram Keech	759	35.42	–4.44
Total valid votes		2,143	99.81	
Total rejected ballots		4	0.19	–0.93
Turnout		2,147	49.56	–9.81
Eligible voters		4,332		
Conservative hold		Swing		+4.44
Source: Elections Ontario

1902 Ontario general election
Party	Candidate	Votes	%	±%
Conservative	James Reid	1,711	60.14	+5.84
Liberal	G. A. Aylesworth	1,134	39.86	–5.84
Total valid votes		2,845	98.89	
Total rejected ballots		32	1.11	+0.66
Turnout		2,877	59.37	–15.24
Eligible voters		4,846		
Conservative hold		Swing		+5.84
Source: Elections Ontario

1898 Ontario general election
Party	Candidate	Votes	%	±%
Conservative	James Reid	1,901	54.30	+1.41
Liberal	C. H. Wartman	1,600	45.70	–1.41
Total valid votes		3,501	99.55	
Total rejected ballots		16	0.45	–0.37
Turnout		3,517	74.61	–1.18
Eligible voters		4,714		
Conservative hold		Swing		+1.41
Source: Elections Ontario

1894 Ontario general election
Party	Candidate	Votes	%	±%
Conservative	James Reid	1,849	52.89	+1.41
Liberal	Frank Halliday	1,647	47.11	–1.41
Total valid votes		3,496	99.18	
Total rejected ballots		29	0.82	–0.13
Turnout		3,525	75.79	+13.74
Eligible voters		4,651		
Conservative hold		Swing		+1.41
Source: Elections Ontario

1890 Ontario general election
Party	Candidate	Votes	%	±%
Conservative	James Reid	1,498	51.48	–1.94
Liberal	Frank Halliday	1,412	48.52	+1.94
Total valid votes		2,910	99.05	
Total rejected ballots		28	0.95	–0.97
Turnout		2,938	62.05	–8.64
Eligible voters		4,735		
Conservative hold		Swing		–1.94
Source: Elections Ontario

1886 Ontario general election
Party	Candidate	Votes	%	±%
Conservative	John Stewart Miller	1,712	53.42	+0.64
Liberal	Hammel Madden Deroche	1,493	46.58	–0.64
Total valid votes		3,205	98.07	
Total rejected ballots		63	1.93	+0.85
Turnout		3,268	70.69	–5.62
Eligible voters		4,623		
Conservative hold		Swing		+0.64
Source: Elections Ontario

1883 Ontario general election
Party	Candidate	Votes	%	±%
Conservative	George Denison	1,739	52.78	+3.52
Liberal	Hammel Madden Deroche	1,556	47.22	–3.52
Total valid votes		3,295	98.92	
Total rejected ballots		36	1.08	+1.08
Turnout		3,331	76.31	+10.77
Eligible voters		4,365		
Conservative gain from Liberal		Swing		+3.52
Source: Elections Ontario

1879 Ontario general election
Party	Candidate	Votes	%	±%
Liberal	Hammel Madden Deroche	1,503	50.74	–10.03
Conservative	George Denison	1,459	49.26	+10.03
Total valid votes		2,962	100.00	
Total rejected ballots		–		
Turnout		2,962	65.55	–2.36
Eligible voters		4,519		
Liberal hold		Swing		–10.03
Source: Elections Ontario

1875 Ontario general election
Party	Candidate	Votes	%	±%
Liberal	Hammel Madden Deroche	1,453	60.77	+9.95
Conservative	G. Lake	938	39.23	–9.95
Total valid votes		2,391	100.00	
Total rejected ballots		–		
Turnout		2,391	67.91	+8.59
Eligible voters		3,521		
Liberal hold		Swing		+9.95
Source: Elections Ontario

1871 Ontario general election
Party	Candidate	Votes	%	±%
Liberal	Hammel Madden Deroche	809	50.82	+24.68
Conservative	Edmund John Glyn Hooper	783	49.18	–24.54
Total valid votes		1,592	100.00	
Total rejected ballots		–		
Turnout		1,592	59.31	–16.62
Eligible voters		2,684		
Liberal gain from Conservative		Swing		+24.61
Source: Elections Ontario

1867 Ontario general election
Party	Candidate	Votes	%
Conservative	Edmund John Glyn Hooper	1,554	73.72
Liberal	Mr. Joyner	551	26.14
Independent	B.C. Davy	3	0.14
Total valid votes		2,108	100.00
Total rejected ballots		–	
Turnout		2,108	75.94
Eligible voters		2,776	
Conservative pickup new district.			
Source: Elections Ontario
