= William Morley Punshon =

19th-century English Nonconformist minister

The Reverend William Morley Punshon
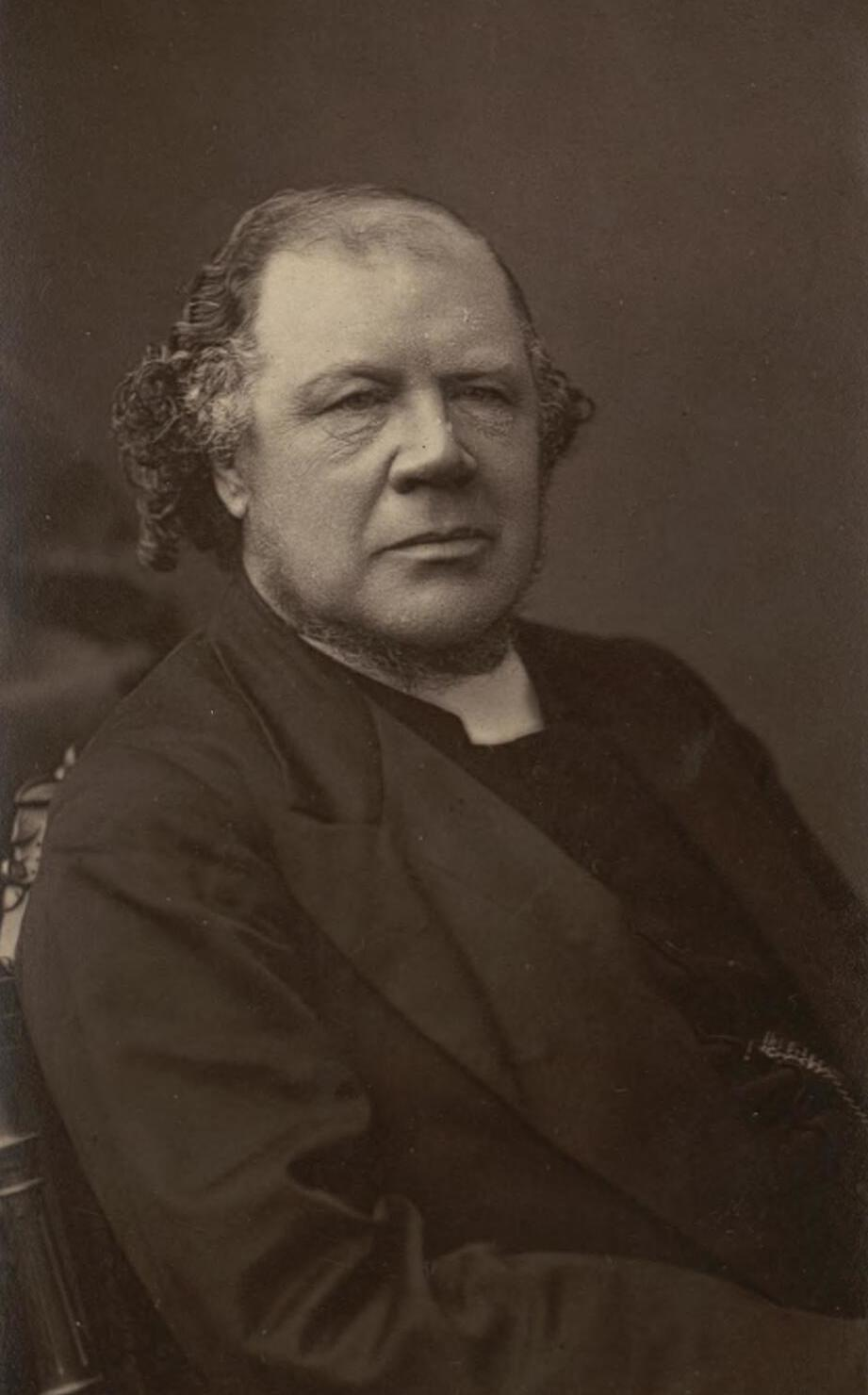
- Portrait of William Morley Punshon

President of the Methodist Conference
- In office 1874–1875
- Preceded by: George T Perks
- Succeeded by: Gervase Smith

Personal details
- Born: 29 May 1824 Doncaster, Yorkshire
- Died: 14 April 1881 (aged 56) Brixton Hill
- Occupation: Methodist minister

William Morley Punshon (29 May 1824 – 14 April 1881) was an English Nonconformist minister.

== Life ==
Punshon was born at Doncaster, Yorkshire, was educated there, and, after spending a few years in business, at the Wesleyan College, Richmond. In 1845 he received his first appointment, at Marden, Kent, and soon became known as a preacher. After serving the usual period of probation he was ordained at Manchester in 1849 and for the next nineteen years travelled in several circuits, including some of those in London (1858–1864).

In 1868 he went to Chicago as the representative of the Wesleyan Methodist conference, and settling in Canada did much to advance the cause of his denomination. His preaching and lecturing drew great crowds both in the Dominion and in the United States, and he was five times president of the Canadian conference. In Canada, he often worked with and mentored Manly Benson a Methodist minister who was an eloquent lecturer. While in Canada, he wed his sister-in-law, a marriage which was forbidden by the British Methodists. In his five short years in Canada Dr. Punshon restored the fortunes of the flagging Victoria College in Cobourg, Ontario, (now Victoria University in the University of Toronto), and created the great Metropolitan Methodist Church in downtown Toronto (now Metropolitan United Church, the flagship congregation of the United Church of Canada).

He returned to England in 1873, was elected president of conference 1874, and in 1875 one of the missionary secretaries. A sign of his oratory was the collection after one of his sermons at the City Road chapel in 1873, which raised £2,079. He also raised £10,000 over three years for the 'Watering Places Chapel Fund' which built 24 chapels in resorts in England and Wales.

He published several volumes of sermons, and a book of verse entitled Sabbath Chimes (1867, new edition 1880).

He died, aged 57, at Tranby Lodge, Brixton Hill, on 14 April 1881 and was interred in a miniature Gothic Revival chapel erected at West Norwood Cemetery. A bust of him was installed at the City Road chapel in 1884.

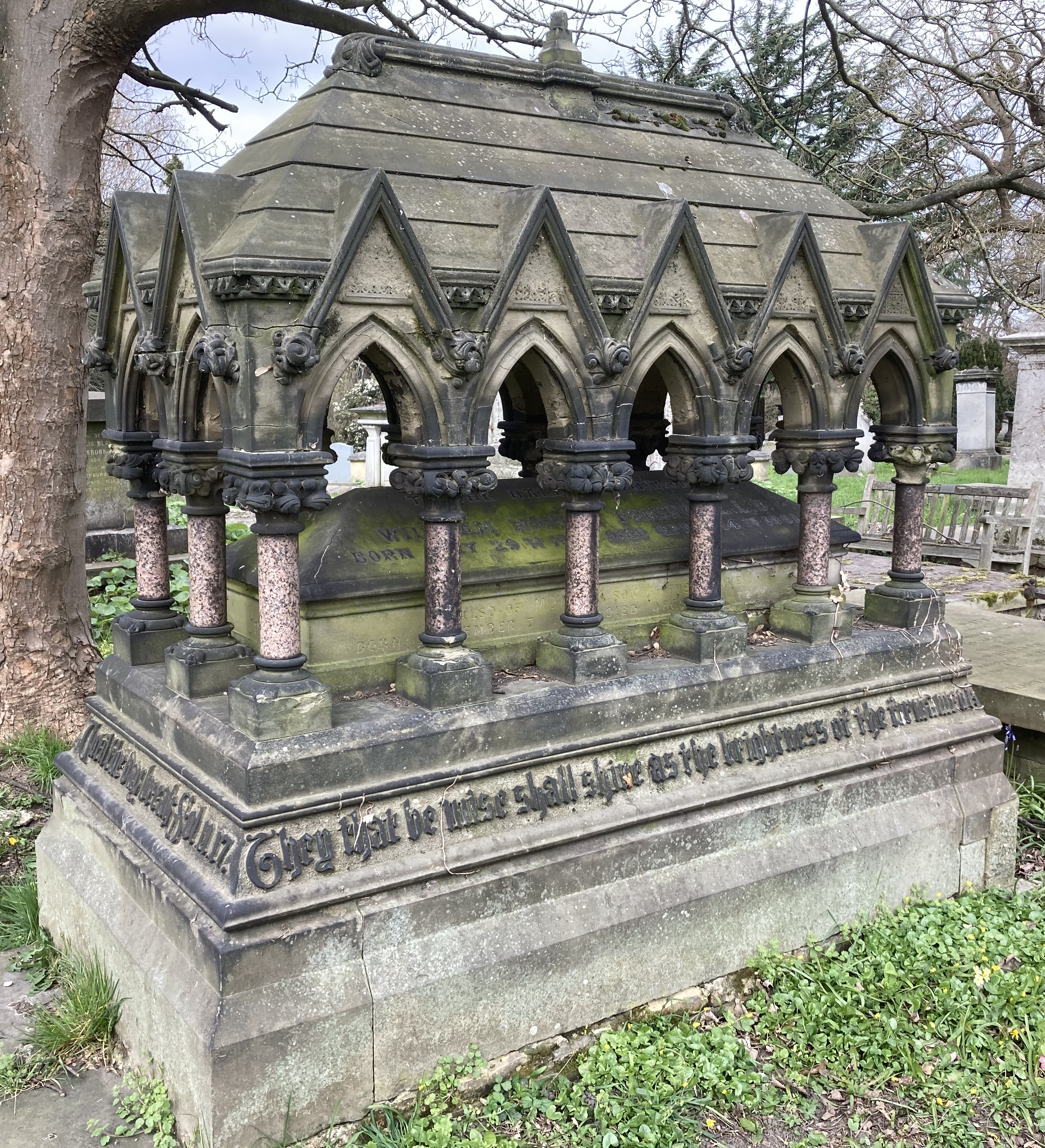
Grave of William Morley Punshon in West Norwood Cemetery
