= Edward James Sexsmith =

Canadian politician

Member of Parliament for Lennox and Addington
- In office December 1921 – October 1925
- Preceded by: William James Paul
- Succeeded by: riding dissolved

Personal details
- Born: Edward James Sexsmith; 29 August 1865 Richmond Township, Lennox and Addington County, Canada West
- Died: 5 April 1946 (aged 80)
- Party: Progressive
- Profession: Farmer, minister

Edward James Sexsmith (29 August 1865 – 5 April 1946) was a Canadian politician, farmer and minister. Sexsmith was a Progressive party member of the House of Commons of Canada. He was born in Richmond Township, Lennox and Addington County, Canada West.

He was elected to Parliament at the Lennox and Addington riding in the 1921 general election. After serving his only federal term, the 14th Canadian Parliament, he was defeated at his new riding of Prince Edward—Lennox by John Hubbs of the Conservatives in the 1925 federal election.
