= Manly Benson =

Manly Benson (27 April 1842 – 20 July 1919) was a Methodist minister. He was born in Newburgh, Upper Canada and attended the Newburgh Academy where he was probably influenced by their religious teachings to convert to the Methodist faith.

Benson taught school for some time and then studied for the ministry. In 1867 he was ordained as a minister of the Wesleyan Methodist Church in Canada. He was becoming a well known and admired public lecturer, when, in 1871, he traveled on a lecture tour with William Morley Punshon, the five times president of the Wesleyan Methodist Canadian conference. Punshon influenced him greatly and became his mentor.

Manly Benson became an important figure within the Wesleyan Methodist Canadian conference and in Canada as a whole through his lectures and leadership.
