= George Denison (Canadian politician) =

Canadian politician

Ontario MPP
- In office 1883–1886
- Preceded by: Hammel Madden Deroche
- Succeeded by: John Stewart Miller
- Constituency: Addington

Personal details
- Born: 1822 County Leitrim, Ireland
- Died: 1902 (aged 79–80)
- Party: Conservative
- Occupation: Justice of the peace

George Denison (1822–1902) was an Ontario farmer and political figure. He represented Addington in the Legislative Assembly of Ontario from 1883 to 1886. He had been associated with the Canada First movement and later developed imperialist ideologies.

He was born in County Leitrim, Ireland, in 1822 and came to Frontenac County, Upper Canada, as an infant. The family first settled near Collins Bay but later moved to Portland Township. Denison was a justice of the peace and a captain in the local militia. He served as reeve for Portland Township and was warden for Frontenac County in 1879.

== Electoral history ==
1879 Ontario general election: Addington
| Party | Candidate | Votes | % | ±% |
|---|---|---|---|---|
| Liberal | Hammel Madden Deroche | 1,531 | 50.75 | −10.02 |
| Conservative | George Denison | 1,486 | 49.25 | +10.02 |
| Total valid votes | | 3,017 | 66.76 | −1.14 |
| Eligible voters | | 4,519 | | |
| Liberal hold | | Swing | | −10.02 |
Source: Elections Ontario
