= The Napanee Guide =

Napanee Guide
- Type: Weekly newspaper
- Format: Tabloid
- Owner: Postmedia
- Editor: Aimee Pianosi
- Founded: 1988
- Language: English
- Headquarters: 2 Dairy Ave., Unit 11, Napanee, Ontario.
- Website: napaneeguide.com

The Napanee Guide is a weekly newspaper in Napanee, Ontario.

== History ==
Since its start in 1988 the paper has seen many changes, from an independent to a corporately owned publication and from a shopper to an award-winning newspaper. It is part of the Postmedia chain of newspapers.
