= Lennox (federal electoral district) =

Former federal electoral district in Ontario, Canada

Coordinates: 44.24°N 76.87°W

Lennox was a federal electoral district represented in the House of Commons of Canada from 1867 to 1904. It was located in the province of Ontario. It was created by the British North America Act 1867.

The County of Lennox consisted of the Townships of Richmond, Adolphustown, North Fredericksburg, South Fredericksburg, Ernest Town, and Amherst Island, and the Village of Napanee.

The electoral district was abolished in 1903 when it was merged into Lennox and Addington.

== Electoral history ==
1867 Canadian federal election
Party	Candidate	Votes
Conservative	Richard John Cartwright	1,268
Unknown	John Thomas Grange	1,122

1872 Canadian federal election
Party	Candidate	Votes
Liberal	Richard John Cartwright	1,224
Unknown	John Stevenson	513

On Mr. Cartwright being named Minister of Finance, 7 November 1873:

By-election on 3 December 1873
Party	Candidate	Votes
Liberal	Richard John Cartwright	acclaimed

1874 Canadian federal election
Party	Candidate	Votes
Liberal	Richard John Cartwright	acclaimed

1878 Canadian federal election
Party	Candidate	Votes
Liberal–Conservative	Edmund John Glyn Hooper	1,358
Liberal	Richard John Cartwright	1,299

1882 Canadian federal election
Party	Candidate	Votes	%
Liberal–Conservative	John A. Macdonald	1,492	53.6%
Liberal	David Wright Allison	1,292	46.4%
Total		2,784	
Source(s) Library of Parliament – History of Federal Ridings since 1867: Lennox

On the election being declared void:

By-election on 26 November 1883
Party	Candidate	Votes
Liberal	David Wright Allison	1,405
Conservative	Matthew William Pruyn	1,401

On the election being declared void:

By-election on 28 January 1885
Party	Candidate	Votes
Conservative	Matthew William Pruyn	1,515
Liberal	David Wright Allison	1,473

1887 Canadian federal election
Party	Candidate	Votes
Conservative	Uriah Wilson	1,635
Liberal	David Wright Allison	1,612

1891 Canadian federal election
Party	Candidate	Votes
Liberal	David Wright Allison	1,637
Conservative	Uriah Wilson	1,580

On the election being declared void:

By-election on 4 February 1892
Party	Candidate	Votes
Conservative	WILSON, Uriah
Liberal	ALLISON, David Wright

1896 Canadian federal election
Party	Candidate	Votes
Conservative	WILSON, Uriah	1,192
Patrons of Industry	SWITZER, E.B.	1,043
Independent	STEVENS, Chas.	690

1900 Canadian federal election
Party	Candidate	Votes
Conservative	WILSON, Uriah	1,570
Liberal	LEONARD, Raymond Alonzo	1,461

== See also ==
- List of Canadian electoral districts
- Historical federal electoral districts of Canada
