= Harrowsmith Magazine =

Canadian magazine

- Publisher: Yolanda Thornton
- Founder: James M. Lawrence
- Founded: 1976
- Company: Moongate Inc.
- Country: Canada
- Based in: Toronto
- Language: English
- Website: www.harrowsmithmag.com
- ISSN: 1190-8416

Harrowsmith Magazine is a national Canadian consumer lifestyle magazine that focuses on healthy, grassroots and sustainable living, homesteading and cultural exploration. It is published four times a year and also produces The Harrowsmith Almanac, the only annual almanac written by Canadians, for Canadians.

== History ==
Harrowsmith was founded in 1976 by James M. Lawrence, who produced the first issues in his home in Camden East Ontario and named it after the nearby town of Harrowsmith. It was a platform for environmental topics and a back-to-the-land ethos, a concept that was both unique and popular—within two years, the magazine had 100,000 subscribers. Lawrence’s Camden House Publishing also published books, and launched Equinox: The Magazine of Canadian Discovery.

In 1988, Lawrence sold both magazines to the Canadian media company Telemedia, which launched an American addition of Harrowsmith and added the words "Country Life" to its title. The American edition reached a paid circulation of 225,000 and, in 1995, Telemedia launched a complementary television show. In 1996, Telemedia folded the American edition and sold Harrowsmith Country Life, and Equinox, to Montreal’s Malcolm Publishing. In 2000, Malcolm folded Equinox and sold its mailing list to Canadian Geographic.

In 2009, Harrowsmith Country Life had a circulation of 125,00 and revenues of $3.2 million. In 2011, it published a single issue and, in August of that year, Malcolm announced that it would cease publication.

In 2012, Yolanda Thornton, a former Malcolm employee, obtained the rights to the magazine and revived Harrowsmith Magazine, with its original title, beginning with Harrowsmith's Truly Canadian Almanac for 2013. Thornton’s company, Moongate Inc. of Toronto, continues as the publisher of Harrowsmith.

Supplemental issues of Harrowsmith have also been published, i.e. Harrowsmith’s Gardening Digest (2013), Harrowsmith's My Kind of Town (2015), Harrowsmith's Homes (2015) and the now-annual Harrowsmith’s Almanac. As of 2025, the magazine’s print and digital per-issue readership was 350,000.
