= Matthew William Pruyn =

Canadian politician

Matthew William Pruyn (October 22, 1822 – March 10, 1898) was an Ontario merchant and political figure. He represented Lennox in the House of Commons of Canada from 1885 to 1887 as a Conservative member.

He was born in Fredericksburgh Township, Upper Canada, the son of W.T. Pruyn. In 1842, he married Mary Margaret Kerby. Pruyn was a merchant in Brantford before moving to Napanee. He was mayor of Brantford in 1858 and served on the town council for Napanee and was also mayor there. Pruyn was an unsuccessful candidate for a federal seat in 1883. He was elected in an 1885 by-election held after the election of David Wright Allison was declared invalid. Pruyn died in Napanee in 1898.
