= Newburgh, Ontario =

Unincorporated community in Ontario, Canada

Coordinates: 44.325776°N 76.877355°W

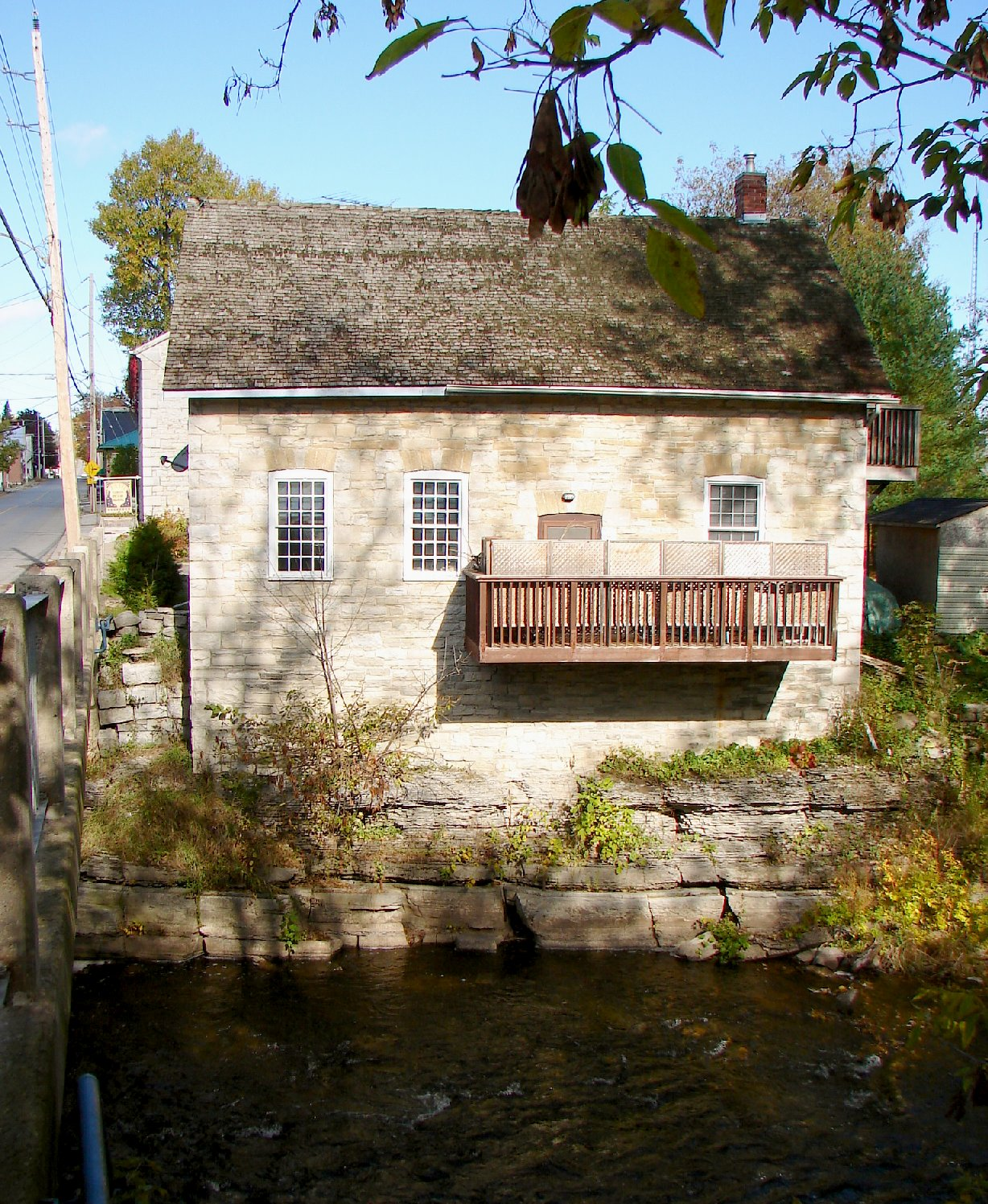
Old mill in Newburgh

Newburgh is an unincorporated community in Ontario, Canada. It is recognized as a designated place by Statistics Canada.

== Demographics ==
In the 2021 Census of Population conducted by Statistics Canada, Newburgh had a population of 695 living in 278 of its 297 total private dwellings, a change of -4.7% from its 2016 population of 729. With a land area of 13.02 km^{2} (5.03 sq mi), it had a population density of 53.4/km^{2} (138.3/sq mi) in 2021.

== See also ==
- List of communities in Ontario
- List of designated places in Ontario
