= Greater Napanee =

Town in Ontario, Canada

- Town (lower-tier)
- Town of Greater Napanee
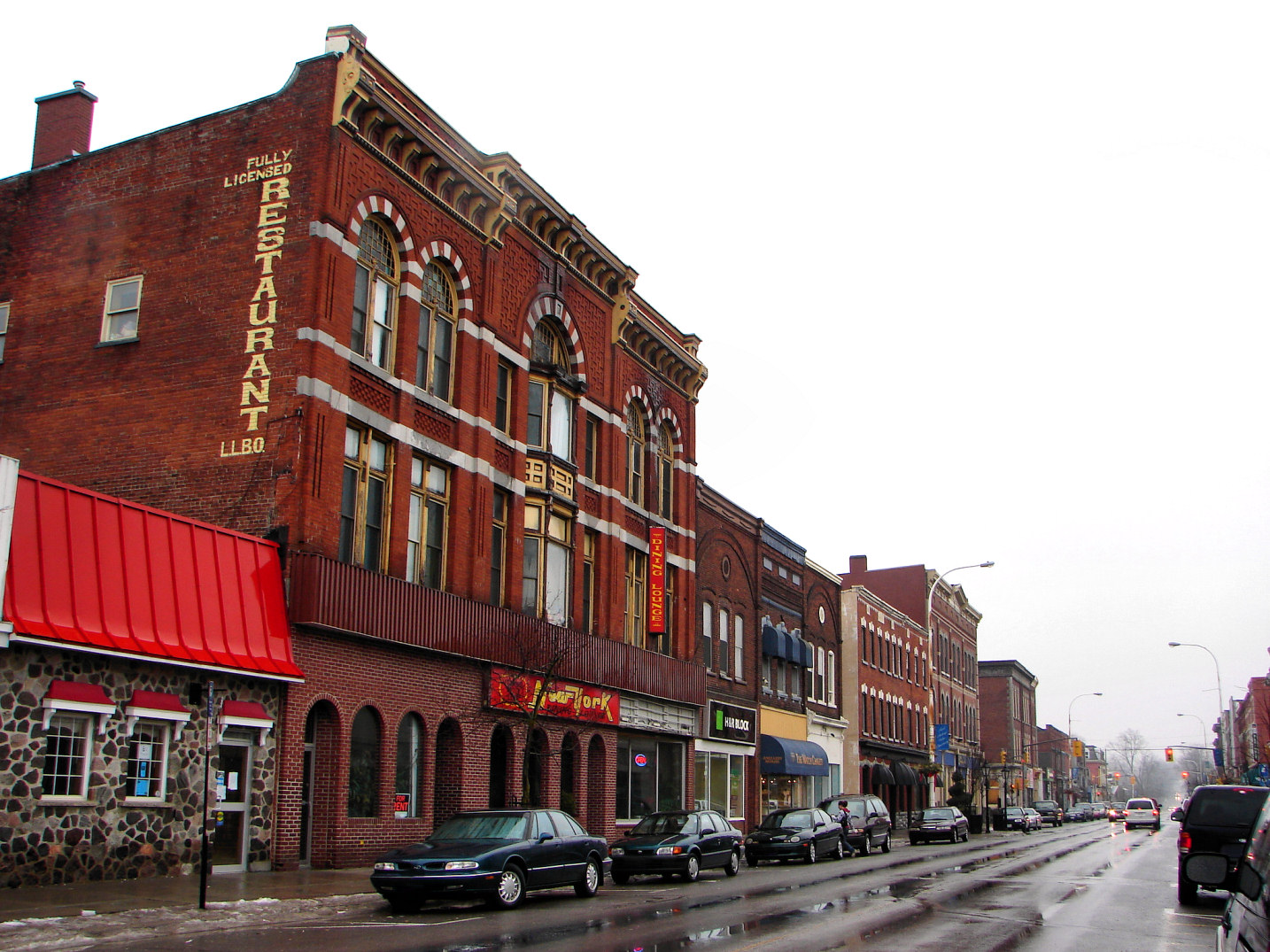
- Dundas Street in Napanee

- Location within Southern Ontario
- Coordinates: 44°15′N 76°57′W
- Country: Canada
- Province: Ontario
- County: Lennox and Addington
- Incorporated: 1998

Government
  - Type: Town
  - Mayor: Terry Richardson
  - Fed. riding: Hastings—Lennox and Addington—Tyendinaga
  - Prov. riding: Hastings—Lennox and Addington

Area
  - Land: 462.30 km^{2} (178.50 sq mi)
  - Urban: 7.92 km^{2} (3.06 sq mi)

Population (2021)
  - Total: 16,879
  - Density: 36.5/km^{2} (95/sq mi)
  - Urban: 8,173
  - Urban density: 1,032.3/km^{2} (2,674/sq mi)
- Time zone: UTC−5 (EST)
  - Summer (DST): UTC−4 (EDT)
- Postal Code: K7R
- Area code: 613
- Website: www.town.greaternapanee.on.ca

Greater Napanee is a town in southeastern Ontario, Canada, approximately 45 kilometres (28 mi) west of Kingston and the county seat of Lennox and Addington County. It is located on the eastern end of the Bay of Quinte. Greater Napanee municipality was created on January 1, 1998, by the amalgamation of the Town of Napanee with Adolphustown Township, North Fredericksburg Township and South Fredericksburg Township, and Richmond Township. Greater Napanee is co-extensive with the original Lennox County.

The town is home to the Allan Macpherson House, a historic 1826 property that is now a museum. Macpherson was a major in the Lennox militia, operated the town's grist and saw mills, as well as the distillery and general store. He served as post master and land agent, operated the first local printing press and helped fund the establishment of many local schools and churches. The home sits on the banks of the Napanee River, which runs through the town.

The main streets are Dundas Street (east–west) and Centre Street (north–south). Dundas Street is part of former provincial Highway #2, also known as Kingston Road, and travels through downtown from Toronto in the west and onward to Kingston in the east. Centre Street travels through the centre of the town from the modern commercial area close to Highway 401 to the downtown and onwards, as County Road 8 to Lake Ontario.

== History ==
The first recorded settlement in the area of Greater Napanee is Ganneious, an Iroquois village, settled temporarily by the Oneida from approximately 1660 to 1690. The village was located on or near the Hay Bay area and is one of seven Iroquois villages settled on the northern shores of Lake Ontario in the 17th century. The exact location of the village has not been determined.

The area was settled by Loyalists in 1784 and Napanee was first incorporated in 1854. The first Loyalists settlers arrived at Adolphustown on June 15, 1784. Their landing spot and site of the first Loyalist cemetery in the area has been preserved by the Loyalists.

The town developed at the site of a waterfall, the head of navigation, on the Napanee River where early industry could utilize the power potential of the river. The river transported logs from the interior north of the town. Sawmilling, gristmilling and other farm service industries were established. Napanee was first known as Clarksville after Robert Clark, who built a grist mill there.

Sir John A. Macdonald, Canada's first prime minister, practised law in Napanee.

=== Historical sites ===
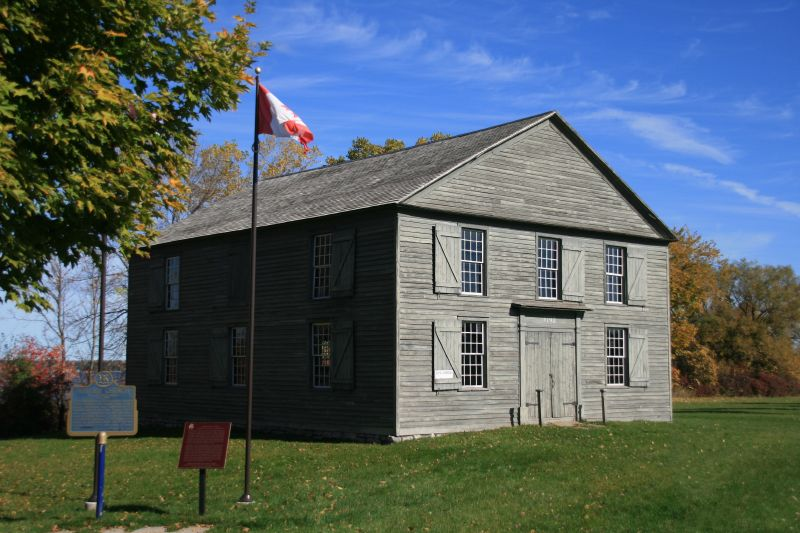
Old Hay Bay Church built in 1792

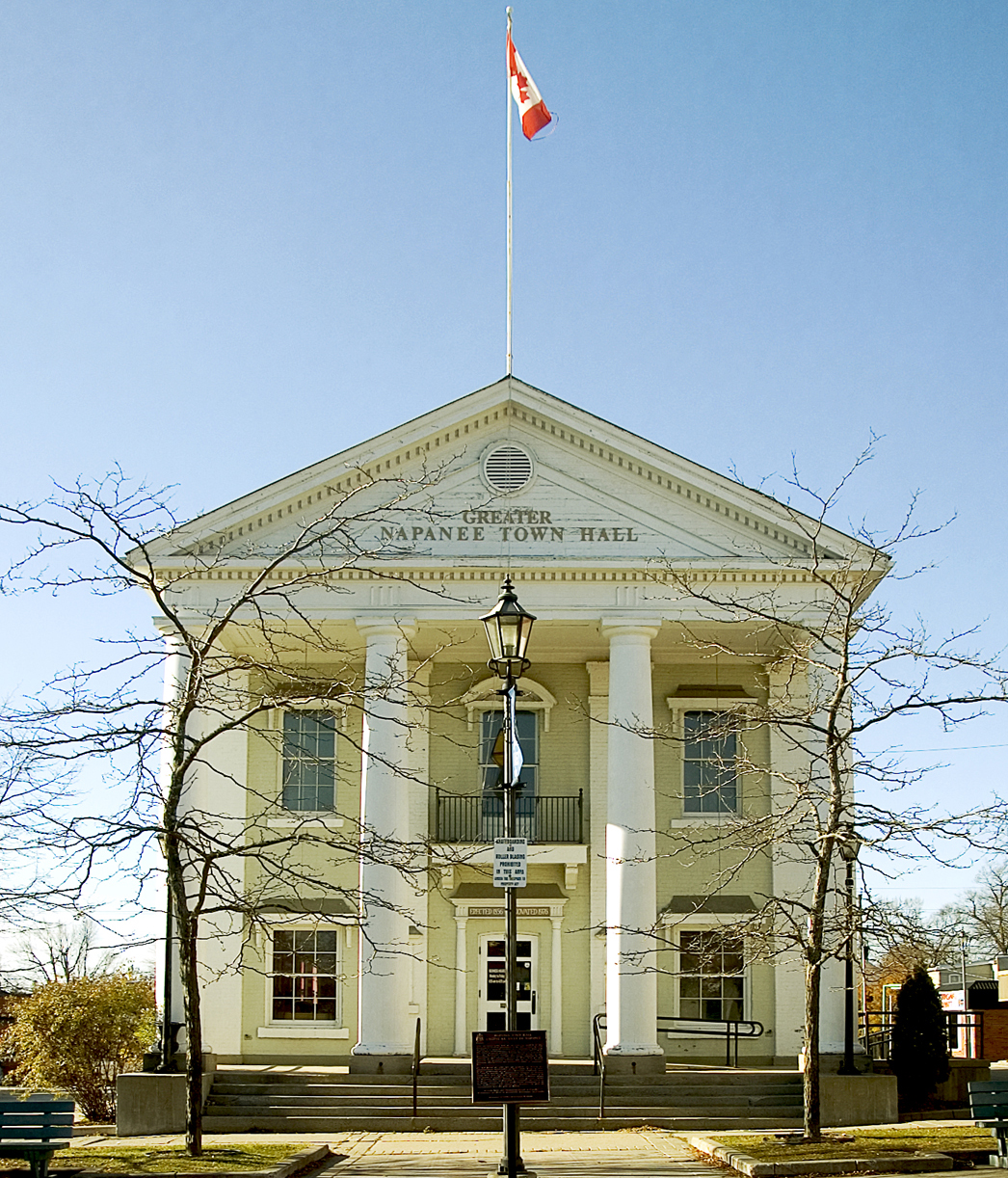
Napanee Town Hall built in 1856

- Allan Macpherson House: (c. 1826) Built for Allan Macpherson, agent for the influential Richard Cartwright family, the house is a Georgian design with neo-classical elements (note the entrance's rectangular transom and radiating muntin bars). The Lennox and Addington Historical Society restored the house to its early 19th century elegance. It now operates as a museum.
- Old Hay Bay Church: (c. 1792) Situated in Adolphustown, Canada's oldest surviving Methodist Church was created in 1792. It now operates as a museum but still hosts an annual service in August.
- County of Lennox & Addington Museum and Archives: (c.1864) The changing exhibits displayed at the Museum allow visitors to step into the county's past, while the papers and documents found in the reading room of the Archives inspire guests to dive into their own family's history as well as the Town's. The Museum also hosts many events for people of all ages to enjoy.
- UEL Heritage Park Centre and Park: (c. 1784) Located at the place where the first United Empire Loyalists landed, this heritage site is now a museum and camping ground perfect for all ages.
- Loyalist Memorial Church: This church, located in Adolphustown, was built to celebrate the 100th anniversary of the first landing of the United Empire Loyalists. Services are still held at this site on Sundays.
- Town of Greater Napanee Town Hall: (c. 1856) Designed by architect, Edward Horsey, this structure was built as a town hall and market combination in the centre of Napanee.

Napanee's downtown core (along Dundas Street) is also lined with historical buildings dating back to the 1800s. The Town of Greater Napanee's Self-Guided Historic Walking Tour provides locations and information on these sites as well as other historical locations nearby.

== Demographics ==
In the 2021 Census of Population conducted by Statistics Canada, Greater Napanee had a population of 16,879 living in 6,868 of its 7,461 total private dwellings, a change of 6.2% from its 2016 population of 15,892. With a land area of 462.3 km^{2} (178.5 sq mi), it had a population density of 36.5/km^{2} (94.6/sq mi) in 2021.

Canada census – Greater Napanee community profile

	2021	2016	2011
Population	16,879 (+6.2% from 2016)	15,892 (2.5% from 2011)	15,511 (0.7% from 2006)
Land area	462.30 km^{2} (178.50 sq mi)	461.17 km^{2} (178.06 sq mi)	461.31 km^{2} (178.11 sq mi)
Population density	36.5/km^{2} (95/sq mi)	34.5/km^{2} (89/sq mi)	33.6/km^{2} (87/sq mi)
Median age	50.4 (M: 48.0, F: 52.4)	45.7 (M: 44.6, F: 46.8)
Private dwellings	7,461 (total) 6,868 (occupied)	6,580 (total)	6,885 (total)
Median household income	$77,500

References: 2021 2016 2011

Historical census populations – Greater Napanee
Year	Pop.	±%
2001	15,132	—
2006	15,400	+1.8%
2011	15,511	+0.7%
2016	15,892	+2.5%
2021	16,879	+6.2%
Source: Statistics Canada

Historical census populations – Napanee Town

Year	Pop.	±%
1871	2,967	—
1881	3,680	+24.0%
1891	3,434	−6.7%
1901	3,143	−8.5%
1911	2,807	−10.7%
1921	3,038	+8.2%
1931	3,497	+15.1%
1941	3,405	−2.6%

Year	Pop.	±%
1951	3,897	+14.4%
1956	4,273	+9.6%
1961	4,500	+5.3%
1966	4,603	+2.3%
1971	4,638	+0.8%
1976	4,844	+4.4%
1981	4,803	−0.8%
1986	4,803	+0.0%

Year	Pop.	±%
1991	5,179	+7.8%
1996	5,450	+5.2%
2001	5,351	−1.8%
2006	7,060	+31.9%
2011	7,221	+2.3%
2016	7,439	+3.0%
2021	8,173	+9.9%

Population figures after 2001 are for Napanee population centre. Population counts are not adjusted for boundary changes.
Source: Statistics Canada

Population:

- Population total in 1996: 14 994
  - Adolphustown: 946
  - Napanee: 5 450
  - North Fredericksburgh: 3 258
  - Richmond: 4 143
  - South Fredericksburgh: 1 197
- Population in 1991:
  - Adolphustown: 886
  - Napanee: 5 179
  - North Fredericksburgh: 3 183
  - Richmond: 4 037
  - South Fredericksburgh: 1 222

Mother tongue (2021):

- English as first language: 95.0%
- French as first language: 1.4%
- English and French as first language: 0.4%
- Other as first language: 2.7%

== Economy ==
The largest employer is a Goodyear Tire and Rubber Company passenger car tire plant (opened in 1988).

=== Shopping ===
The downtown area of Napanee is home to a number of boutiques. There have been multiple revitalization projects like The Waterfront River Pub and Terrace, a complete reworking of an abandoned limestone brewery right on the Napanee river. Wallace's, the oldest continuously operating drug store, is located on the corner of Dundas and John Streets. It has been in the same location under the same name since it was established in 1854.

Napanee is also the home of "La Pizzeria", made famous by Avril Lavigne's declaration to Rolling Stone Magazine that her "favorite pizza" was served there.

=== Tourism ===
Napanee River Falls located at Greater Napanee's Springside Park

- Springside Park Trails & Falls
- Napanee River Tours

== Culture ==
=== Annual town events ===
Some annual events are the Napanee Riverfront Festival and the Multicultural Festival, Music By The River, the Scarecrow Festival, the Downtown Shopping Party and the Big Bright Light Show, as well as an annual art exhibition and sale in Conservation Park, Art in the Park. Napanee also hosts a bi-weekly Hometown Market in the summer months.

The Napanee Country Jamboree and the Voodoo Rockfest take place the third week of September annually.

=== Live theatre ===
Greater Napanee is home to Lennox Community Theatre (formerly Lennox Theatre Guild) which operates from The Village Theatre in the village of Selby. The theatre seats 80 and mounts five productions annually from September through June. A historical collection of programs stored at the theatre shows that Avril Lavigne performed on stage there as a child in productions of You're A Good Man, Charlie Brown, and Godspell.

== Sports ==
The Napanee Raiders Jr. C hockey club joined the Empire B Junior C Hockey League in 1989. In that time they have claimed eight league championships. In 1993 they went on to capture the All-Ontario, Clarence Schmalz Cup as the Ontario Hockey Association's Junior "C" ice hockey champions by defeating the Hanover Barons of the Western Ontario Junior C Hockey League. The Raiders used to be the only EBJCHL team to ever capture the All Ontario title up until the Picton Pirates accomplished the task in 2013. The Raiders were crowned the Schmalz Cup and PJHL Champions in the 2018-2019 season defeating the Grimaby Peach Kings. Their home games are played in the Strathcona Paper Centre, which opened in 2004. Prior to the Raiders, Napanee played in the Quinte-St. Lawrence Junior C Hockey League as The Napanee Kelly Tiremen. Their uniform resembled the green, yellow and white uniform of the Minnesota North Stars formerly of the NHL. In 1980, the Kelly Tiremen were rebranded as the Napanee Warriors. The Warriors and the league ceased operation in 1986.

Napanee made one appearance in the Ontario Junior "B" Provincial hockey championship playoffs during the 1934–35 season. They defeated Kingston, 13–10 in a two-game, total goals series, second round playoff. They were eliminated from the Sutherland Cup playoffs by Peterborough in the next round.

The Napanee Comets were a successful Ontario Major Intermediate A Hockey team that won three consecutive Ontario championships in 1958, 1959 and 1960 and provincial Intermediate B championships in 1971 and 1972.

The Lennox & Addington Lynx floor hockey team took the gold medal at the Special Olympics Canadian National Winter Games in Quebec City in 2008, defeating teams from across the country.

Napanee is also well known for its success in both boys and girls softball. Napanee has won four national midget (U19) championships since 1982 including 2018 when it claimed the title on home field. The Napanee Legionnaires captured the Canadian title in 1982 and the Napanee Express took top honours in 1997 and 2005. The Napanee North Key Express won the 2010 Canadian Junior fastball championship defeating the host Nova Scotia Eagles 6–1 in the national final. The Napanee (Junior) Express boys claimed a National Junior Fastball title in 1996. Also in 2008, the Napanee (Bantam) Express girls fastball team captured the provincial tier II title defeating Oakville 7–4 in the final. The girls also became the first team in Napanee history to qualify for the Eastern Canadian Championships where they finished in second place.

The Napanee Golf and Country Club was established in 1897. The course has nine holes, with different tees for the front and back nine. The course record is 62 set by local amateur Josh Whalen, breaking the previous record of 63 after it had stood for 58 years and 30 days.

The Napanee Curling Club was established in 1957 and numerous teams have captured Zone and District titles. Napanee was selected to host the 2010 Ontario Tankard, the annual men's curling championship that sends its winner to the Canadian championship. The event was held February 1–7 at the Strathcona Paper Centre. Glenn Howard, representing Coldwater and District Curling Club, completed a perfect week by defeating Bryan Cochrane of the Rideau Curling Club 5–3 in the final, to capture his fifth straight title.

Napanee District Secondary School is the home of the Golden Hawks. The Golden Hawks field teams in various sports including hockey, football, basketball, rugby, gymnastics, volleyball, swimming and track. The Golden Hawks compete against high schools teams in the "Kingston Area Secondary Schools Athletic Association" (KASSAA). In 2008, the Napanee girls rugby team and the boys junior and senior squads all won league championships. In 2009, the girls gymnastics team earned the bronze medal for their overall result at the Ontario Federation of School Athletic Association's (OFSAA) provincial gymnastics championship meet held in Windsor, Ontario.

== Education ==
Schools:

- Southview Public School
- The Prince Charles Public School
- Cornerstone Christian Academy
- J. J. O'Neill Catholic School
- Selby Public School
- Napanee District Secondary School

Some students commute a short distance to Ernestown Secondary School to the east in Loyalist township, Holy Cross Catholic Secondary School further east in Kingston, or Loyalist Collegiate and Vocational Institute for the LEAP and Challenge Program in Kingston. A bus also takes students to Kingston Collegiate and Vocational Institute for the International Baccalaureate program.

== Media ==
Napanee is home to the oldest independently owned newspaper in Canada, The Napanee Beaver. It is distributed weekly along with the "Napanee Guide" on Thursdays.

In 2007, a new radio station, CKYM, opened in Napanee on 88.7 FM. The station broadcasts adult contemporary music, sharing a transmitting antenna with Deseronto's CJOH-TV-6. 88.7 MyFM has provided OHL Kingston Frontenacs Hockey coverage since 2009. Napanee from is also served by radio and television stations from Belleville and the larger Kingston market.

A 100% volunteer-run community radio station, Island Radio CJAI 101.3 FM, serves Napanee from nearby Loyalist Township.

== Notable people ==
- Aaron Doornekamp, professional basketball player, member of the Canadian national men's basketball team.
- Alan Aylesworth Macnaughton, Senator and former Member of Parliament for the electoral district of Mount Royal between 1949 and 1966. Speaker of the House of Commons (1963–1966), founder of the Canadian branch of the World Wildlife Fund and Officer of the Order of Canada (1995). Born in Napanee on July 30, 1903. The Senator was the grandson of a former mayor of Napanee, Jehiel Aylesworth.
- Albert Schultz, Gemini Award winning actor, he starred in the CBC Television hit drama Street Legal and the medical drama Side Effects. His theatre career includes leading roles at the Stratford Festival and as Founding Artistic Director of the Soulpepper Theatre Company. Schultz moved to Napanee at an early age and he attended elementary school there.
- Arthur Eyguem De Montaigne Jarvis, World War I flying ace. As a member of the Royal Flying Corps scored at least five victories. Awarded the United Kingdom's Distinguished Flying Cross (DFC). Also decorated by the government of France with the Croix de Guerre with Palm. Jarvis was born in Napanee and spent his childhood there. His father was the deacon of the Anglican church in Napanee.
- Avril Lavigne, musician, grew up in Napanee. She sang about the town in her song "My World" from her debut album, Let Go. The town is also mentioned in her single "Young & Dumb." Avril Lavigne has sold more than 35 million albums worldwide.
- Britt Benn, athlete, member of Canada's gold medal-winning team in Rugby Women's Sevens at the 2015 Pan Am Games in Toronto. Benn was also a bronze medal winner at the 2016 Olympic games in Rio de Janeiro, Brazil in the same event.
- Deborah Kimmett, writer and comedian and former member of The Second City's Toronto cast.
- Edgar D’Arcy McGreer, (1898-1973), Born in Napanee, joined the Department of External Affairs in 1927. Served as High Commissioner to South Africa, envoy to Denmark, envoy to Poland, Ambassador to Israel, and Ambassador to Greece.
- Edmund James Bristol, Born (September 4, 1861) and raised in Napanee. Member of Parliament (MP) serving the electoral district of Toronto Centre in the House of Commons of Canada (1905 by-election and re-elected in 1908, 1911, 1917, 1921, and 1925). In 1921, he served as Minister without Portfolio in Prime Minister Arthur Meighen's cabinet. An avid sportsman, Edmund Bristol won the Royal Canadian Yacht Club's Prince of Wales Cup in 1895.
- Kathleen Frances Daly, painter. Born in Napanee on May 28, 1898. Closely associated with the Group of Seven, her works can be found in many major Canadian exhibitions as well as in exhibits in London, England.
- H. Bedford-Jones, born in Napanee, Henry James O'Brien Bedford-Jones (1887–1949) was a Canadian historical adventure fantasy and science fiction writer. He wrote over 100 novels and was considered one of the leading pulp fiction writers of the 20th century.
- Harry Ham, born in Napanee, Harry Breden Ham (1886–1943) was an early silent screen actor in Christie and Mutual comedies from the mid-1910s. Perhaps his most famous role was that of leading man, Harry Faversham in the UK release of The Four Feathers (1921 film).
- John Gibbard founded the Gibbard Furniture Company in Napanee in 1835. The company operated for 173 years and was the oldest furniture maker in Canada and one of the oldest continuously operating companies in North America at the time of its closing. Gibbard's furniture can be found in many Canadian embassies around the world.
- Sir John A. Macdonald, lawyer, businessman, politician, first Prime Minister of Canada. At age 17, Sir John A. managed a branch legal office in Napanee (1832–1834). As Prime Minister he would bring Manitoba, BC and PEI into the confederation of Canada. Sir John A. Macdonald was the architect of the transcontinental railway that united the West Coast with the rest of Canada. This critical rail link was a condition for B.C. joining the confederation.
- Leroy Blugh, Former Canadian Football League defensive lineman who played fifteen seasons in the CFL including eleven seasons for the Edmonton Eskimos. Two-time CFL West Division All-Star and Grey Cup Champion (1993). In 2014, Blugh was named defensive line coach for the CFL's, Ottawa Redblacks. Later in 2014, Blugh was named to the Canadian Football Hall of Fame.
- Lesley Thompson, Five-time Olympic medalist, including winner of an Olympic gold medal in the Women's Eights Rowing event in Barcelona, Spain, 1992. Upon winning a silver medal in the same event at the London 2012 games, she became the first Canadian to win medals at five different Olympic Games.
- Michael Breaugh (1942–2019) Member of Parliament (MP) in the House of Commons of Canada (1990–1993) representing the electoral district of Oshawa. Prior to that Breaugh served as Member of the Provincial Parliament (MPP) for Oshawa in the Legislative Assembly of Ontario (1975 to 1990).
- Ralph McCabe, former Major League Baseball pitcher with the Cleveland Indians (1946)
- Reginald Aldworth Daly, (1871–1957) geologist; taught at the Massachusetts Institute of Technology (1907–12) before joining Harvard University (1912–42). He was an authority on igneous rocks and the geological structures of the Earth's crust and independently developed the theory of magmatic stoping. Daly was awarded the Penrose Medal in 1935, the Wollaston Medal in 1942 and the William Bowie Medal in 1946. Craters on Mars and the Moon are named in his honor. His home in Cambridge, Massachusetts, (the Reginald A. Daly House) is now an American National Historic Landmark.
- Ryan Gary Letourneau, (born 1988) full-time Twitch streamer and YouTuber; known online as Northernlion.
- Scott Chadwick, professional curler with Team Epping
- Stuart Wood, was born in Napanee on October 17, 1889, served as the ninth Commissioner of the Royal Canadian Mounted Police, from March 6, 1938, to April 30, 1951. He was a CMG (Companion of the Order of St. Michael and St. George) and the great-great-grandson of U.S. President Zachary Taylor.
- Toby Sexsmith, was born in Napanee on October 23, 1885, and served as a Member of Provincial Parliament in the Legislative Assembly of Manitoba from 1933 to 1943, and also served as president of the Canadian Amateur Hockey Association.
- Helen Merrill Egerton (1866-1951), Canadian writer

== See also ==
- List of townships in Ontario
- Nappanee, Indiana
