= List of Canadian electoral districts (1952–1966) =

This is a list of electoral districts or ridings in Canada for the Canadian federal elections of 1953, 1957, 1958, 1962, 1963, and 1965. For the first time, each of Canada's territories would return one member each, instead of one member for both.

Electoral districts are constituencies that elect members of Parliament in Canada's House of Commons every election.

== Newfoundland – 7 seats ==
- Bonavista—Twillingate
- Burin—Burgeo
- Grand Falls—White Bay—Labrador
- Humber—St. George's
- St. John's East
- St. John's West
- Trinity—Conception

== Nova Scotia – 12 seats ==
- Antigonish—Guysborough
- Cape Breton North and Victoria
- Cape Breton South
- Colchester—Hants
- Cumberland
- Digby—Annapolis—Kings
- Halifax*
- Inverness—Richmond
- Pictou
- Queens—Lunenburg
- Shelburne—Yarmouth—Clare

== Prince Edward Island – 4 seats ==
- King's
- Prince
- Queen's*

== New Brunswick – 10 seats ==
- Charlotte
- Gloucester
- Kent
- Northumberland (renamed Northumberland-Miramichi in 1955)
- Restigouche—Madawaska
- Royal
- St. John—Albert
- Victoria—Carleton
- Westmorland
- York—Sunbury

== Quebec – 75 seats ==
- Argenteuil—Deux-Montagnes
- Beauce
- Beauharnois—Salaberry
- Bellechasse
- Berthier—Maskinongé—delanaudière
- Bonaventure
- Brome—Missisquoi
- Cartier
- Chambly—Rouville
- Champlain
- Chapleau
- Charlevoix
- Châteauguay—Huntingdon—Laprairie
- Chicoutimi
- Compton—Frontenac
- Dollard
- Dorchester
- Drummond—Arthabaska
- Gaspé
- Gatineau
- Hochelaga
- Hull
- Îles-de-la-Madeleine
- Jacques Cartier—Lasalle
- Joliette—L'Assomption—Montcalm
- Kamouraska
- Labelle
- Lac-Saint-Jean
- Lafontaine
- Lapointe
- Laurier
- Laval
- Lévis
- Longueuil
- Lotbinière
- Maisonneuve—Rosemont
- Matapédia—Matane
- Mégantic
- Mercier
- Montmagny—L'Islet
- Mount Royal
- Nicolet—Yamaska
- Notre-Dame-de-Grâce
- Outremont—St-Jean
- Papineau
- Pontiac—Témiscamingue
- Portneuf
- Quebec East
- Quebec South
- Quebec West
- Québec—Montmorency
- Richelieu—Verchères
- Richmond—Wolfe
- Rimouski
- Roberval
- Saguenay
- Saint-Antoine—Westmount
- Saint-Denis
- Saint-Henri
- Saint-Hyacinthe—Bagot
- Saint-Jacques
- Saint-Jean—Iberville—Napierville
- Saint-Maurice—Laflèche
- Sainte-Marie
- Shefford
- Sherbrooke
- St. Ann
- St. Lawrence—St. George
- Stanstead
- Témiscouata (renamed Rivière-du-Loup—Témiscouata in 1959)
- Terrebonne
- Trois-Rivières
- Vaudreuil—Soulanges
- Verdun
- Villeneuve

== Ontario – 85 seats ==
- Algoma East
- Algoma West
- Brant—Haldimand
- Brantford
- Broadview
- Bruce
- Carleton
- Cochrane
- Danforth
- Davenport
- Dufferin—Simcoe
- Durham
- Eglinton
- Elgin
- Essex East
- Essex South
- Essex West
- Fort William
- Glengarry—Prescott
- Greenwood
- Grenville—Dundas
- Grey North
- Grey—Bruce
- Halton
- Hamilton East
- Hamilton South
- Hamilton West
- Hastings South
- Hastings—Frontenac
- High Park
- Huron
- Kenora—Rainy River
- Kent
- Kingston
- Lambton West
- Lambton—Kent
- Lanark
- Leeds
- Lincoln
- London
- Middlesex East
- Middlesex West
- Niagara Falls
- Nickel Belt
- Nipissing
- Norfolk
- Northumberland
- Ontario
- Ottawa East
- Ottawa West (federal electoral district)Ottawa West
- Oxford
- Parkdale
- Parry Sound-Muskoka
- Peel
- Perth
- Peterborough West
- Port Arthur
- Prince Edward—Lennox
- Renfrew North
- Renfrew South
- Rosedale
- Russell
- Simcoe East
- Simcoe North
- Spadina
- St. Paul's
- Stormont
- Sudbury
- Timiskaming
- Timmins
- Trinity
- Victoria
- Waterloo North
- Waterloo South
- Welland
- Wellington South
- Wellington—Huron
- Wentworth
- York Centre
- York East
- York North
- York South
- York West
- York—Humber
- York—Scarborough

== Manitoba – 14 seats ==
- Brandon—Souris
- Churchill
- Dauphin
- Lisgar
- Marquette
- Portage—Neepawa
- Provencher
- Selkirk
- Springfield
- St. Boniface
- Winnipeg North
- Winnipeg North Centre
- Winnipeg South
- Winnipeg South Centre

== Saskatchewan – 17 seats ==
- Assiniboia
- Humboldt—Melfort (renamed Humboldt—Melfort—Tisdale in 1961)
- Kindersley
- Mackenzie
- Meadow Lake
- Melville
- Moose Jaw—Lake Centre
- Moose Mountain
- Prince Albert
- Qu'Appelle
- Regina City
- Rosetown—Biggar
- Rosthern
- Saskatoon
- Swift Current—Maple Creek (Swift Current prior to 1953)
- The Battlefords
- Yorkton

== Alberta – 17 seats ==
- Acadia
- Athabaska
- Battle River—Camrose
- Bow River
- Calgary North
- Calgary South
- Edmonton East
- Edmonton West
- Edmonton—Strathcona
- Jasper—Edson
- Lethbridge
- Macleod
- Medicine Hat
- Peace River
- Red Deer
- Vegreville
- Wetaskiwin

== British Columbia – 22 seats ==
- Burnaby—Coquitlam
- Burnaby—Richmond
- Cariboo
- Coast-Capilano
- Comox—Alberni
- Esquimalt—Saanich
- Fraser Valley
- Kamloops
- Kootenay East
- Kootenay West
- Nanaimo (renamed Nanaimo—Cowichan—The Islands in 1962)
- New Westminster
- Okanagan Boundary
- Okanagan—Revelstoke
- Skeena
- Vancouver Centre
- Vancouver East
- Vancouver Kingsway
- Vancouver Quadra
- Vancouver South
- Vancouver—Burrard
- Victoria

== Northwest Territories – 1 seat ==
- Mackenzie River (merged into Northwest Territories in 1962)

== Yukon – 1 seat ==
- Yukon

*returned two members

| Preceded by Electoral districts 1947–1952 | Historical federal electoral districts of Canada | Succeeded by Electoral districts 1966–1976 |
