= List of Canadian electoral districts (1924–1933) =

This is a list of electoral districts or ridings in Canada for the Canadian federal elections of 1925, 1926 and 1930.

Electoral districts are constituencies that elect members of Parliament (MPs) in Canada's House of Commons every election.

The electoral districts and their boundaries for the period of these elections were set based on population, following the sixth decennial census (1921). This was provided under Section 8 of the Constitution Act, 1867, with changes to the districts enacted in the Representation Act of 1924.

== Nova Scotia – 14 seats ==
- Antigonish—Guysborough
- Cape Breton North—Victoria
- Cape Breton South
- Colchester
- Cumberland
- Digby—Annapolis
- Halifax (Note: Returned two members)
- Hants—Kings
- Inverness
- Pictou
- Queens—Lunenburg
- Richmond—West Cape Breton
- Shelburne—Yarmouth

== Prince Edward Island – 4 seats ==
- King's
- Prince
- Queen's

== New Brunswick – 11 seats ==
- Charlotte
- Gloucester
- Kent
- Northumberland
- Restigouche—Madawaska
- Royal
- St. John—Albert
- Victoria—Carleton
- Westmorland
- York—Sunbury

== Quebec – 65 seats ==
- Argenteuil
- Bagot
- Beauce
- Beauharnois
- Bellechasse
- Berthier—Maskinongé
- Bonaventure
- Brome—Missisquoi
- Cartier
- Chambly—Verchères
- Champlain
- Charlevoix—Saguenay
- Châteauguay—Huntingdon
- Chicoutimi
- Compton
- Dorchester
- Drummond—Arthabaska
- Gaspé
- Hochelaga
- Hull
- Jacques Cartier
- Joliette
- Kamouraska
- L'Assomption—Montcalm
- L'Islet
- Labelle
- Lake St. John
- Laprairie—Napierville
- Laurier—Outremont
- Laval—Two Mountains
- Lévis
- Lotbinière
- Maisonneuve
- Matane
- Mégantic
- Montmagny
- Mount Royal
- Nicolet
- Pontiac
- Portneuf
- Quebec East
- Quebec South
- Quebec West
- Québec—Montmorency
- Richelieu
- Richmond—Wolfe
- Rimouski
- Shefford
- Sherbrooke
- St. Ann
- St. Antoine
- St. Denis
- St. Henri
- St. Hyacinthe—Rouville
- St. James
- St. Johns—Iberville
- St. Lawrence—St. George
- St. Mary
- Stanstead
- Témiscouata
- Terrebonne
- Three Rivers—St. Maurice
- Vaudreuil—Soulanges
- Wright
- Yamaska

== Ontario – 82 seats ==
- Algoma East
- Algoma West
- Brant
- Brantford City
- Bruce North
- Bruce South
- Carleton
- Dufferin—Simcoe
- Durham
- Elgin West
- Essex East
- Essex South
- Essex West
- Fort William
- Frontenac—Addington
- Glengarry
- Grenville—Dundas
- Grey North
- Grey Southeast
- Haldimand
- Halton
- Hamilton East
- Hamilton West
- Hamilton South
- Hastings South
- Hastings—Peterborough
- Huron North
- Huron South
- Kenora—Rainy River
- Kent
- Kingston City
- Lambton East
- Lambton West
- Lanark
- Leeds
- Lincoln
- London
- Middlesex East
- Middlesex West
- Muskoka—Ontario
- Nipissing
- Norfolk—Elgin
- Northumberland
- Ontario
- Ottawa (City of)
- Oxford North
- Oxford South
- Parkdale
- Parry Sound
- Peel
- Perth North
- Perth South
- Peterborough West
- Port Arthur—Thunder Bay
- Prescott
- Prince Edward—Lennox
- Renfrew North
- Renfrew South
- Russell
- Simcoe East
- Simcoe North
- Stormont
- Timiskaming North
- Timiskaming South
- Toronto East
- Toronto East Centre
- Toronto Northeast
- Toronto Northwest
- Toronto South
- Toronto West Centre
- Toronto—High Park
- Toronto—Scarborough
- Victoria
- Waterloo North
- Waterloo South
- Welland
- Wellington North
- Wellington South
- Wentworth
- York North
- York South
- York West

== Manitoba – 17 seats ==
- Brandon
- Dauphin
- Lisgar
- Macdonald
- Marquette
- Neepawa
- Nelson
- Portage la Prairie
- Provencher
- Selkirk
- Souris
- Springfield
- St. Boniface
- Winnipeg North
- Winnipeg North Centre
- Winnipeg South
- Winnipeg South Centre

== Saskatchewan – 21 seats ==
- Assiniboia
- Humboldt
- Kindersley
- Last Mountain
- Long Lake
- Mackenzie
- Maple Creek
- Melfort
- Melville
- Moose Jaw
- North Battleford
- Prince Albert
- Qu'Appelle
- Regina
- Rosetown
- Saskatoon
- South Battleford
- Swift Current
- Weyburn
- Willow Bunch
- Yorkton

== Alberta – 16 seats ==
- Acadia
- Athabaska
- Battle River
- Bow River
- Calgary East
- Calgary West
- Camrose
- Edmonton East
- Edmonton West
- Lethbridge
- Macleod
- Medicine Hat
- Peace River
- Red Deer
- Vegreville
- Wetaskiwin

== British Columbia – 14 seats ==
- Cariboo
- Comox—Alberni
- Fraser Valley
- Kootenay East
- Kootenay West
- Nanaimo
- New Westminster
- Skeena
- Vancouver Centre
- Vancouver North
- Vancouver South
- Vancouver—Burrard
- Victoria
- Yale

== Yukon – 1 seat ==
- Yukon

== Notes ==
Preceded by Electoral districts 1914–1924	Historical federal electoral districts of Canada	Succeeded by Electoral districts 1933–1947
