= List of Canadian electoral districts (1947–1952) =

This is a list of electoral districts or ridings in Canada for the Canadian federal election of 1949. In 1947, ten new districts were created, but Newfoundland became a province in 1949, adding seven new districts. There were no elections held between 1947 and 1949, and there were no by-elections held in Newfoundland after joining confederation.

Electoral districts are constituencies that each elect one member of Parliament in Canada's House of Commons every election.

== Newfoundland – 7 seats ==
- Bonavista—Twillingate
- Burin—Burgeo
- Grand Falls—White Bay
- Humber—St. George's
- St. John's East
- St. John's West
- Trinity—Conception

== Nova Scotia – 13 seats ==
- Annapolis—Kings
- Antigonish—Guysborough
- Cape Breton North and Victoria
- Cape Breton South
- Colchester—Hants
- Cumberland
- Digby—Yarmouth
- Halifax*
- Inverness—Richmond
- Lunenburg
- Pictou
- Queens—Shelburne

== Prince Edward Island – 4 seats ==
- King's
- Prince
- Queen's*

== New Brunswick – 10 seats ==
- Charlotte
- Gloucester
- Kent
- Northumberland
- Restigouche—Madawaska
- Royal
- St. John—Albert
- Victoria—Carleton
- Westmorland
- York—Sunbury

== Quebec – 73 seats ==
- Argenteuil—Deux-Montagnes
- Beauce
- Beauharnois
- Bellechasse
- Berthier—Maskinongé
- Bonaventure
- Brome—Missisquoi
- Cartier
- Chambly—Rouville
- Champlain
- Chapleau
- Charlevoix
- Châteauguay—Huntingdon—Laprairie
- Chicoutimi
- Compton—Frontenac
- Dorchester
- Drummond—Arthabaska
- Gaspé
- Gatineau
- Hochelaga
- Hull
- Îles-de-la-Madeleine
- Jacques Cartier
- Joliette—L'Assomption—Montcalm
- Kamouraska
- Labelle
- Lac-Saint-Jean
- Lafontaine
- Lapointe
- Laurier
- Laval
- Lévis
- Lotbinière
- Maisonneuve—Rosemont
- Matapédia—Matane
- Mégantic
- Mercier
- Montmagny—L'Islet
- Mount Royal
- Nicolet—Yamaska
- Notre-Dame-de-Grâce
- Outremont—St-Jean
- Papineau
- Pontiac—Témiscamingue
- Portneuf
- Quebec East
- Quebec South
- Quebec West
- Québec—Montmorency
- Richelieu—Verchères
- Richmond—Wolfe
- Rimouski
- Roberval
- Saguenay
- Saint-Hyacinthe—Bagot
- Saint-Jean—Iberville—Napierville
- Saint-Maurice—Laflèche
- Shefford
- Sherbrooke
- St-Denis
- St. Henri
- St. Ann
- St. Antoine—Westmount
- St. James
- St. Lawrence—St. George
- St. Mary
- Stanstead
- Témiscouata
- Terrebonne
- Trois-Rivières
- Vaudreuil—Soulanges
- Verdun—La Salle
- Villeneuve

== Ontario – 83 seats ==
- Algoma East
- Algoma West
- Brant—Wentworth
- Brantford
- Broadview
- Bruce
- Carleton
- Cochrane
- Danforth
- Davenport
- Dufferin—Simcoe
- Durham
- Eglinton
- Elgin
- Essex East
- Essex South
- Essex West
- Fort William
- Frontenac—Addington
- Glengarry
- Greenwood
- Grenville—Dundas
- Grey North
- Grey—Bruce
- Haldimand
- Halton
- Hamilton East
- Hamilton West
- Hastings South
- Hastings—Peterborough
- High Park
- Huron North
- Huron—Perth
- Kenora—Rainy River
- Kent
- Kingston City
- Lambton West
- Lambton—Kent
- Lanark
- Leeds
- Lincoln
- London
- Middlesex East
- Middlesex West
- Nipissing
- Norfolk
- Northumberland
- Ontario
- Ottawa East
- Ottawa West
- Oxford
- Parkdale
- Parry Sound-Muskoka
- Peel
- Perth
- Peterborough West
- Port Arthur
- Prescott
- Prince Edward—Lennox
- Renfrew North
- Renfrew South
- Rosedale
- Russell
- Simcoe East
- Simcoe North
- Spadina
- St. Paul's
- Stormont
- Sudbury
- Timiskaming
- Timmins
- Trinity
- Victoria
- Waterloo North
- Waterloo South
- Welland
- Wellington North
- Wellington South
- Wentworth
- York East
- York North
- York South
- York West

== Manitoba – 16 seats ==
- Brandon
- Churchill
- Dauphin
- Lisgar
- Marquette
- Norquay
- Portage—Neepawa
- Provencher
- Selkirk
- Souris
- Springfield
- St. Boniface
- Winnipeg North
- Winnipeg North Centre
- Winnipeg South
- Winnipeg South Centre

== Saskatchewan – 20 seats ==
- Assiniboia
- Humboldt
- Kindersley
- Lake Centre
- Mackenzie
- Maple Creek
- Meadow Lake
- Melfort
- Melville
- Moose Jaw
- Moose Mountain
- Prince Albert
- Qu'Appelle
- Regina City
- Rosetown—Biggar
- Rosthern
- Saskatoon
- Swift Current
- The Battlefords
- Yorkton

== Alberta – 17 seats ==
- Acadia
- Athabaska
- Battle River
- Bow River
- Calgary East
- Calgary West
- Camrose
- Edmonton East
- Edmonton West
- Jasper—Edson
- Lethbridge
- Macleod
- Medicine Hat
- Peace River
- Red Deer
- Vegreville
- Wetaskiwin

== British Columbia – 18 seats ==
- Burnaby—Richmond
- Cariboo
- Coast—Capilano
- Comox—Alberni
- Fraser Valley
- Kamloops
- Kootenay East
- Kootenay West
- Nanaimo
- New Westminster
- Skeena
- Vancouver Centre
- Vancouver East
- Vancouver Quadra
- Vancouver South
- Vancouver—Burrard
- Victoria
- Yale

== Yukon / Northwest Territories – 1 seat ==
- Yukon—Mackenzie River

*returned two members

Preceded by Electoral districts 1933–1947	Historical federal electoral districts of Canada	Succeeded by Electoral districts 1952–1966
