= List of Canadian electoral districts (1933–1947) =

This is a list of electoral districts or ridings in Canada for the Canadian federal elections of 1935, 1940 and 1945.

Electoral districts are constituencies that elect members of Parliament in Canada's House of Commons every election.

== Nova Scotia – 12 seats ==
- Antigonish—Guysborough
- Cape Breton North and Victoria
- Cape Breton South
- Colchester—Hants
- Cumberland
- Digby—Annapolis—Kings
- Halifax*
- Inverness—Richmond
- Pictou
- Queens—Lunenburg
- Shelburne—Yarmouth—Clare

== Prince Edward Island – 4 seats ==
- King's
- Prince
- Queen's*

== New Brunswick – 10 seats ==
- Charlotte
- Gloucester
- Kent
- Northumberland
- Restigouche—Madawaska
- Royal
- St. John—Albert
- Victoria—Carleton
- Westmorland
- York—Sunbury

== Quebec – 65 seats ==
- Argenteuil
- Beauce
- Beauharnois—Laprairie
- Bellechasse
- Berthier—Maskinongé
- Bonaventure
- Brome—Missisquoi
- Cartier
- Chambly—Rouville
- Champlain
- Chapleau
- Charlevoix—Saguenay
- Châteauguay—Huntingdon
- Chicoutimi
- Compton
- Dorchester
- Drummond—Arthabaska
- Gaspé
- Hochelaga
- Hull
- Jacques Cartier
- Joliette—L'Assomption—Montcalm
- Kamouraska
- Labelle
- Lake St-John—Roberval
- Laurier
- Laval—Two Mountains
- Lévis
- Lotbinière
- Maisonneuve—Rosemont
- Matapédia—Matane
- Mégantic—Frontenac
- Mercier
- Montmagny—L'Islet
- Mount Royal
- Nicolet—Yamaska
- Outremont
- Pontiac
- Portneuf
- Quebec East
- Quebec South
- Quebec West and South
- Québec—Montmorency
- Richelieu—Verchères
- Richmond—Wolfe
- Rimouski
- Shefford
- Sherbrooke
- St-Maurice—Laflèche
- St. Ann
- St. Antoine—Westmount
- St. Denis
- St. Henri
- St. Hyacinthe—Bagot
- St. James
- St. Johns—Iberville—Napierville
- St. Lawrence—St. George
- St. Mary
- Stanstead
- Témiscouata
- Terrebonne
- Three Rivers
- Vaudreuil—Soulanges
- Verdun
- Wright

== Ontario – 82 seats ==
- Algoma East
- Algoma West
- Brant
- Brantford City
- Broadview
- Bruce
- Carleton
- Cochrane
- Danforth
- Davenport
- Dufferin—Simcoe
- Durham
- Eglinton
- Elgin
- Essex East
- Essex South
- Essex West
- Fort William
- Frontenac—Addington
- Glengarry
- Greenwood
- Grenville—Dundas
- Grey North
- Grey—Bruce
- Haldimand
- Halton
- Hamilton East
- Hamilton West
- Hastings South
- Hastings—Peterborough
- High Park
- Huron North
- Huron—Perth
- Kenora—Rainy River
- Kent
- Kingston City
- Lambton West
- Lambton—Kent
- Lanark
- Leeds
- Lincoln
- London
- Middlesex East
- Middlesex West
- Muskoka—Ontario
- Nipissing
- Norfolk
- Northumberland
- Ontario
- Ottawa East
- Ottawa West
- Oxford
- Parkdale
- Parry Sound
- Peel
- Perth
- Peterborough West
- Port Arthur
- Prescott
- Prince Edward—Lennox
- Renfrew North
- Renfrew South
- Rosedale
- Russell
- Simcoe East
- Simcoe North
- Spadina
- St. Paul's
- Stormont
- Timiskaming
- Trinity
- Victoria
- Waterloo North
- Waterloo South
- Welland
- Wellington North
- Wellington South
- Wentworth
- York East
- York North
- York South
- York West

== Manitoba – 17 seats ==
- Brandon
- Churchill
- Dauphin
- Lisgar
- Macdonald
- Marquette
- Neepawa
- Portage la Prairie
- Provencher
- Selkirk
- Souris
- Springfield
- St. Boniface
- Winnipeg North
- Winnipeg North Centre
- Winnipeg South
- Winnipeg South Centre

== Saskatchewan – 21 seats ==
- Assiniboia
- Humboldt
- Kindersley
- Lake Centre
- Mackenzie
- Maple Creek
- Melfort
- Melville
- Moose Jaw
- North Battleford
- Prince Albert
- Qu'Appelle
- Regina City
- Rosetown—Biggar
- Rosthern
- Saskatoon City
- Swift Current
- The Battlefords
- Weyburn
- Wood Mountain
- Yorkton

== Alberta – 17 seats ==
- Acadia
- Athabaska
- Battle River
- Bow River
- Calgary East
- Calgary West
- Camrose
- Edmonton East
- Edmonton West
- Jasper—Edson
- Lethbridge
- Macleod
- Medicine Hat
- Peace River
- Red Deer
- Vegreville
- Wetaskiwin

== British Columbia – 16 seats ==
- Cariboo
- Comox—Alberni
- Fraser Valley
- Kamloops
- Kootenay East
- Kootenay West
- Nanaimo
- New Westminster
- Skeena
- Vancouver Centre
- Vancouver East
- Vancouver North
- Vancouver South
- Vancouver—Burrard
- Victoria
- Yale

== Yukon – 1 seat ==
- Yukon

*returned two members

Preceded by Electoral districts 1924–1933	Historical federal electoral districts of Canada	Succeeded by Electoral districts 1947–1952
