= List of Canadian electoral districts (1886–1892) =

This is a list of electoral districts or ridings in Canada for the Canadian federal elections of 1887 and 1891. In 1887, the North-West Territories, which became part of Canada in 1870, were granted representation in the House of Commons.

Electoral districts are constituencies that elect members of Parliament in Canada's House of Commons every election.

== Nova Scotia – 21 seats ==
- Annapolis
- Antigonish
- Cape Breton*
- Colchester
- Cumberland
- Digby
- Guysborough
- Halifax*
- Hants
- Inverness
- Kings
- Lunenburg
- Pictou*
- Queens
- Richmond
- Shelburne
- Victoria
- Yarmouth

== Prince Edward Island – 6 seats ==
- King's County*
- Prince County*
- Queen's County*

== New Brunswick – 16 seats ==
- Albert
- Carleton
- Charlotte
- City and County of St. John*
- City of St. John
- Gloucester
- Kent
- King's
- Northumberland
- Queen's
- Restigouche
- Sunbury
- Victoria
- Westmorland
- York

== Quebec - 65 seats ==
- Argenteuil
- Bagot
- Beauce
- Beauharnois
- Bellechasse
- Berthier
- Bonaventure
- Brome
- Chambly
- Champlain
- Charlevoix
- Châteauguay
- Chicoutimi—Saguenay
- Compton
- Dorchester
- Drummond—Arthabaska
- Gaspé
- Hochelaga
- Huntingdon
- Iverbville
- Jacques Cartier
- Joliette
- Kamouraska
- L'Assomption
- L'Islet
- Laprairie
- Laval
- Lévis
- Lotbinière
- Maskinongé
- Mégantic
- Missisquoi
- Montcalm
- Montmagny
- Montmorency
- Montreal Centre
- Montreal East
- Montreal West
- Napierville
- Nicolet
- Ottawa (County of)
- Pontiac
- Portneuf
- Quebec County
- Quebec East
- Quebec West
- Quebec-Centre
- Richelieu
- Richmond—Wolfe
- Rimouski
- Rouville
- Saint Maurice
- Shefford
- Town of Sherbrooke
- Soulanges
- St. Hyacinthe
- St. John's
- Stanstead
- Témiscouata
- Terrebonne
- Three Rivers
- Two Mountains
- Vaudreuil
- Verchères
- Yamaska

== Ontario – 92 seats ==
- Addington
- Algoma
- Bothwell
- Brant North
- Brant South
- Brockville
- Bruce East
- Bruce North
- Bruce South
- Cardwell
- Carleton
- Cornwall and Stormont
- Dundas
- Durham East
- Durham West
- Elgin East
- Elgin West
- Essex North
- Essex South
- Frontenac
- Glengarry
- Grenville South
- Grey East
- Grey North
- Grey South
- Haldimand
- Halton
- Hamilton*
- Hastings East
- Hastings North
- Hastings West
- Huron East
- Huron South
- Huron West
- Kent
- Kingston
- Lambton East
- Lambton West
- Lanark North
- Lanark South
- Leeds North and Grenville North
- Leeds South
- Lennox
- Lincoln and Niagara
- London
- Middlesex East
- Middlesex North
- Middlesex South
- Middlesex West
- Monck
- Muskoka and Parry Sound
- Norfolk North
- Norfolk South
- Northumberland East
- Northumberland West
- Ontario North
- Ontario South
- Ontario West
- Ottawa (City of)*
- Oxford North
- Oxford South
- Peel
- Perth North
- Perth South
- Peterborough East
- Peterborough West
- Prescott
- Prince Edward
- Renfrew North
- Renfrew South
- Russell
- Simcoe East
- Simcoe North
- Simcoe South
- Toronto Centre
- Toronto East
- Victoria North
- Victoria South
- Waterloo North
- Waterloo South
- Welland
- Wellington Centre
- Wellington North
- Wellington South
- Wentworth North
- Wentworth South
- West Toronto
- York East
- York North
- York West

== Manitoba – 5 seats ==
- Lisgar
- Marquette
- Provencher
- Selkirk
- Winnipeg

== British Columbia – 6 seats ==
- Cariboo
- New Westminster
- Vancouver
- Victoria*
- Yale

== North-West Territories – 4 seats ==
- Alberta (Provisional District)
- Assiniboia East
- Assiniboia West
- Saskatchewan (Provisional District)

*returned two members

Preceded by Electoral districts 1882–1886	Historical federal electoral districts of Canada	Succeeded by Electoral districts 1892–1903
