= List of Canadian electoral districts (1903–1907) =

This is a list of electoral districts or ridings in Canada for the 1904 federal election.

Electoral districts are constituencies that elect members of Parliament in Canada's House of Commons every election.

== Nova Scotia – 18 seats ==
- Annapolis
- Antigonish
- Cape Breton South
- Colchester
- Cumberland
- Digby
- Guysborough
- Halifax*
- Hants
- Inverness
- Kings
- Lunenburg
- North Cape Breton and Victoria
- Pictou
- Richmond
- Shelburne and Queen's
- Yarmouth

== Prince Edward Island – 4 seats ==
- King's
- Prince
- Queen's*

== New Brunswick – 13 seats ==
- Carleton
- Charlotte
- City and County of St. John
- City of St. John
- Gloucester
- Kent
- King's and Albert
- Northumberland
- Restigouche
- Sunbury—Queen's
- Victoria
- Westmorland
- York

== Quebec – 65 seats ==
- Argenteuil
- Bagot
- Beauce
- Beauharnois
- Bellechasse
- Berthier
- Bonaventure
- Brome
- Chambly—Verchères
- Champlain
- Charlevoix
- Châteauguay
- Chicoutimi—Saguenay
- Compton
- Dorchester
- Drummond—Arthabaska
- Gaspé
- Hochelaga
- Huntingdon
- Jacques Cartier
- Joliette
- Kamouraska
- L'Assomption
- L'Islet
- Labelle
- Laprairie—Napierville
- Laval
- Lévis
- Lotbinière
- Maisonneuve
- Maskinongé
- Mégantic
- Missisquoi
- Montcalm
- Montmagny
- Montmorency
- Nicolet
- Pontiac
- Portneuf
- Quebec County
- Quebec East
- Quebec West
- Quebec-Centre
- Richelieu
- Richmond—Wolfe
- Rimouski
- Rouville
- Shefford
- Town of Sherbrooke
- Soulanges
- St. Anne
- St. Antoine
- St. Hyacinthe
- St. James
- St. Johns—Iberville
- St. Lawrence
- St. Mary
- Stanstead
- Témiscouata
- Terrebonne
- Three Rivers and St. Maurice
- Two Mountains
- Vaudreuil
- Wright
- Yamaska

== Ontario – 86 seats ==
- Algoma East
- Algoma West
- Brant
- Brantford
- Brockville
- Bruce North
- Bruce South
- Carleton
- Dufferin
- Dundas
- Durham
- Elgin East
- Elgin West
- Essex North
- Essex South
- Frontenac
- Glengarry
- Grenville
- Grey East
- Grey North
- Grey South
- Haldimand
- Halton
- Hamilton East
- Hamilton West
- Hastings East
- Hastings West
- Huron East
- Huron South
- Huron West
- Kent East
- Kent West
- Kingston
- Lambton East
- Lambton West
- Lanark North
- Lanark South
- Leeds
- Lennox and Addington
- Lincoln
- London
- Middlesex East
- Middlesex North
- Middlesex West
- Muskoka
- Nipissing
- Norfolk
- Northumberland East
- Northumberland West
- Ontario North
- Ontario South
- Ottawa (City of)*
- Oxford North
- Oxford South
- Parry Sound
- Peel
- Perth North
- Perth South
- Peterborough East
- Peterborough West
- Prescott
- Prince Edward
- Renfrew North
- Renfrew South
- Russell
- Simcoe East
- Simcoe North
- Simcoe South
- Stormont
- Thunder Bay and Rainy River
- Toronto Centre
- Toronto East
- Toronto North
- Toronto South
- Toronto West
- Victoria
- Waterloo North
- Waterloo South
- Welland
- Wellington North
- Wellington South
- Wentworth
- York Centre
- York North
- York South

== Manitoba – 10 seats ==
- Brandon
- Dauphin
- Lisgar
- Macdonald
- Marquette
- Portage la Prairie
- Provencher
- Selkirk
- Souris
- Winnipeg

== British Columbia – 7 seats ==
- Comox—Atlin
- Kootenay
- Nanaimo
- New Westminster
- Vancouver City
- Victoria City
- Yale—Cariboo

== Northwest Territories – 10 seats ==
- Alberta
- Assiniboia East
- Assiniboia West
- Calgary
- Edmonton
- Humboldt
- Mackenzie
- Qu'Appelle
- Saskatchewan
- Strathcona

== Yukon – 1 seat ==
- Yukon

Preceded by Electoral districts 1892–1903	Historical federal electoral districts of Canada	Succeeded by Electoral districts 1907–1914
