= List of Canadian electoral districts (1892–1903) =

This is a list of electoral districts or ridings in Canada for the Canadian federal elections of 1896 and 1900.

Electoral districts are constituencies that elect members of Parliament in Canada's House of Commons every election.

== Nova Scotia – 20 seats ==
- Annapolis
- Antigonish
- Cape Breton*
- Colchester
- Cumberland
- Digby
- Guysborough
- Halifax*
- Hants
- Inverness
- Kings
- Lunenburg
- Pictou*
- Richmond
- Shelburne and Queen's
- Victoria
- Yarmouth

== Prince Edward Island – 5 seats ==
- East Prince
- East Queen's
- King's
- West Prince
- West Queen's

== New Brunswick – 14 seats ==
- Albert
- Carleton
- Charlotte
- City and County of St. John
- City of St. John
- Gloucester
- Kent
- King's
- Northumberland
- Restigouche
- Sunbury—Queen's
- Victoria
- Westmorland
- York

== Quebec – 65 seats ==
- Argenteuil
- Bagot
- Beauce
- Beauharnois
- Bellechasse
- Berthier
- Bonaventure
- Brome
- Chambly—Verchères (Chambly prior to 1893)
- Champlain
- Charlevoix
- Châteauguay
- Chicoutimi—Saguenay
- Compton
- Dorchester
- Drummond—Arthabaska
- Gaspé
- Hochelaga
- Huntingdon
- Jacques Cartier
- Joliette
- Kamouraska
- L'Assomption
- L'Islet
- Labelle
- Laprairie—Napierville
- Laval
- Lévis
- Lotbinière
- Maisonneuve
- Maskinongé
- Mégantic
- Missisquoi
- Montcalm
- Montmagny
- Montmorency
- Nicolet
- Pontiac
- Portneuf
- Quebec County
- Quebec East
- Quebec West
- Quebec-Centre
- Richelieu
- Richmond—Wolfe
- Rimouski
- Rouville
- Shefford
- Town of Sherbrooke
- Soulanges
- St. Anne
- St. Antoine
- St. Hyacinthe
- St. James
- St. Johns—Iberville
- St. Lawrence
- St. Mary
- Stanstead
- Témiscouata
- Terrebonne
- Three Rivers and St. Maurice
- Two Mountains
- Vaudreuil
- Wright
- Yamaska

== Ontario – 92 seats ==
- Addington
- Algoma
- Bothwell
- Brant South
- Brockville
- Bruce East
- Bruce North
- Bruce West
- Cardwell
- Carleton
- Cornwall and Stormont
- Dundas
- Durham East
- Durham West
- Elgin East
- Elgin West
- Essex North
- Essex South
- Frontenac
- Glengarry
- Grenville South
- Grey East
- Grey North
- Grey South
- Haldimand and Monck
- Halton
- Hamilton*
- Hastings East
- Hastings North
- Hastings West
- Huron East
- Huron South
- Huron West
- Kent
- Kingston
- Lambton East
- Lambton West
- Lanark North
- Lanark South
- Leeds North and Grenville North
- Leeds South
- Lennox
- Lincoln and Niagara
- London
- Middlesex East
- Middlesex North
- Middlesex South
- Middlesex West
- Muskoka and Parry Sound
- Nipissing
- Norfolk North
- Norfolk South
- Northumberland East
- Northumberland West
- Ontario North
- Ontario South
- Ontario West
- Ottawa (City of)*
- Oxford North
- Oxford South
- Peel
- Perth North
- Perth South
- Peterborough East
- Peterborough West
- Prescott
- Prince Edward
- Renfrew North
- Renfrew South
- Russell
- Simcoe East
- Simcoe North
- Simcoe South
- Toronto Centre
- Toronto East
- Victoria North
- Victoria South
- Waterloo North
- Waterloo South
- Welland
- Wellington Centre
- Wellington North
- Wellington South
- Wentworth North and Brant
- Wentworth South
- West Toronto*
- York East
- York North
- York West

== Manitoba – 7 seats ==
- Brandon
- Lisgar
- Macdonald
- Marquette
- Provencher
- Selkirk
- Winnipeg

== British Columbia – 6 seats ==
- Burrard
- New Westminster
- Vancouver
- Victoria*
- Yale—Cariboo

== North-West Territories – 4 seats ==
- Alberta (Provisional District)
- Assiniboia East
- Assiniboia West
- Saskatchewan (Provisional District)

== Yukon – 1 seat ==
- Yukon (created in 1902)

*returned two members

Preceded by Electoral districts 1886–1892	Historical federal electoral districts of Canada	Succeeded by Electoral districts 1903–1907
