= List of Canadian electoral districts (1907–1914) =

This is a list of electoral districts or ridings in Canada for the Canadian federal elections of 1908 and 1911. It includes the creation of the provinces of Alberta and Saskatchewan whose districts were re-aligned in 1907. The Northwest Territories did not return any members.

Electoral districts are constituencies that elect members of Parliament in Canada's House of Commons every election.

== Nova Scotia – 18 seats ==
- Annapolis
- Antigonish
- Cape Breton South
- Colchester
- Cumberland
- Digby
- Guysborough
- Halifax*
- Hants
- Inverness
- Kings
- Lunenburg
- North Cape Breton and Victoria
- Pictou
- Richmond
- Shelburne and Queen's
- Yarmouth

== Prince Edward Island – 4 seats ==
- King's
- Prince
- Queen's*

== New Brunswick – 13 seats ==
- Carleton
- Charlotte
- City and County of St. John
- City of St. John
- Gloucester
- Kent
- King's and Albert
- Northumberland
- Restigouche
- Sunbury—Queen's
- Victoria
- Westmorland
- York

== Quebec – 65 seats ==
- Argenteuil
- Bagot
- Beauce
- Beauharnois
- Bellechasse
- Berthier
- Bonaventure
- Brome
- Chambly—Verchères
- Champlain
- Charlevoix
- Châteauguay
- Chicoutimi—Saguenay
- Compton
- Dorchester
- Drummond—Arthabaska
- Gaspé
- Hochelaga
- Huntingdon
- Jacques Cartier
- Joliette
- Kamouraska
- L'Assomption
- L'Islet
- Labelle
- Laprairie—Napierville
- Laval
- Lévis
- Lotbinière
- Maisonneuve
- Maskinongé
- Mégantic
- Missisquoi
- Montcalm
- Montmagny
- Montmorency
- Nicolet
- Pontiac
- Portneuf
- Quebec County
- Quebec East
- Quebec West
- Quebec-Centre
- Richelieu
- Richmond—Wolfe
- Rimouski
- Rouville
- Shefford
- Town of Sherbrooke
- Soulanges
- St. Anne
- St. Antoine
- St. Hyacinthe
- St. James
- St. Johns—Iberville
- St. Lawrence
- St. Mary
- Stanstead
- Témiscouata
- Terrebonne
- Three Rivers and St. Maurice
- Two Mountains
- Vaudreuil
- Wright
- Yamaska

== Ontario – 86 seats ==
- Algoma East
- Algoma West
- Brant
- Brantford
- Brockville
- Bruce North
- Bruce South
- Carleton
- Dufferin
- Dundas
- Durham
- Elgin East
- Elgin West
- Essex North
- Essex South
- Frontenac
- Glengarry
- Grenville
- Grey East
- Grey North
- Grey South
- Haldimand
- Halton
- Hamilton East
- Hamilton West
- Hastings East
- Hastings West
- Huron East
- Huron South
- Huron West
- Kent East
- Kent West
- Kingston
- Lambton East
- Lambton West
- Lanark North
- Lanark South
- Leeds
- Lennox and Addington
- Lincoln
- London
- Middlesex East
- Middlesex North
- Middlesex West
- Muskoka
- Nipissing
- Norfolk
- Northumberland East
- Northumberland West
- Ontario North
- Ontario South
- Ottawa (City of)*
- Oxford North
- Oxford South
- Parry Sound
- Peel
- Perth North
- Perth South
- Peterborough East
- Peterborough West
- Prescott
- Prince Edward
- Renfrew North
- Renfrew South
- Russell
- Simcoe East
- Simcoe North
- Simcoe South
- Stormont
- Thunder Bay and Rainy River
- Toronto Centre
- Toronto East
- Toronto North
- Toronto South
- Toronto West
- Victoria
- Waterloo North
- Waterloo South
- Welland
- Wellington North
- Wellington South
- Wentworth
- York Centre
- York North
- York South

== Manitoba – 10 seats ==
- Brandon
- Dauphin
- Lisgar
- Macdonald
- Marquette
- Portage la Prairie
- Provencher
- Selkirk
- Souris
- Winnipeg

== Saskatchewan – 10 seats ==
- Assiniboia
- Battleford
- Humboldt
- Mackenzie
- Moose Jaw
- Prince Albert
- Qu'Appelle
- Regina
- Saltcoats
- Saskatoon

== Alberta – 7 seats ==
- Calgary
- Edmonton
- Macleod
- Medicine Hat
- Red Deer
- Strathcona
- Victoria

== British Columbia – 7 seats ==
- Comox—Atlin
- Kootenay
- Nanaimo
- New Westminster
- Vancouver City
- Victoria City
- Yale—Cariboo

== Yukon – 1 seat ==
- Yukon

*returned two members

Preceded by Electoral districts 1903–1907	Historical federal electoral districts of Canada	Succeeded by Electoral districts 1914–1924
