= List of Canadian electoral districts (1873–1882) =

This is a list of electoral districts or ridings in Canada for the 1874 Canadian federal election. New seats were added in 1873 when Prince Edward Island became a province.

Electoral districts are constituencies that elect members of Parliament in Canada's House of Commons every election.

== Nova Scotia – 21 seats ==
- Annapolis
- Antigonish
- Cape Breton*
- Colchester
- Cumberland
- Digby
- Guysborough
- Halifax*
- Hants
- Inverness
- Kings
- Lunenburg
- Pictou*
- Queens
- Richmond
- Shelburne
- Victoria
- Yarmouth

== Prince Edward Island – 6 seats ==
- King's County*
- Prince County*
- Queen's County*

== New Brunswick – 16 seats ==
- Albert
- Carleton
- Charlotte
- City and County of St. John*
- City of St. John
- Gloucester
- Kent
- King's
- Northumberland
- Queen's
- Restigouche
- Sunbury
- Victoria
- Westmorland
- York

== Quebec – 65 seats ==
- Argenteuil
- Bagot
- Beauce
- Beauharnois
- Bellechasse
- Berthier
- Bonaventure
- Brome
- Chambly
- Champlain
- Charlevoix
- Châteauguay
- Chicoutimi—Saguenay
- Compton
- Dorchester
- Drummond—Arthabaska
- Gaspé
- Hochelaga
- Huntingdon
- Iverbville
- Jacques Cartier
- Joliette
- Kamouraska
- L'Assomption
- L'Islet
- Laprairie
- Laval
- Lévis
- Lotbinière
- Maskinongé
- Mégantic
- Missisquoi
- Montcalm
- Montmagny
- Montmorency
- Montreal Centre
- Montreal East
- Montreal West
- Napierville
- Nicolet
- Ottawa (County of)
- Pontiac
- Portneuf
- Quebec County
- Quebec East
- Quebec West
- Quebec-Centre
- Richelieu
- Richmond—Wolfe
- Rimouski
- Rouville
- Saint Maurice
- Shefford
- Town of Sherbrooke
- Soulanges
- St. Hyacinthe
- St. John's
- Stanstead
- Témiscouata
- Terrebonne
- Three Rivers
- Two Mountains
- Vaudreuil
- Verchères
- Yamaska

== Ontario – 88 seats ==
- Addington
- Algoma
- Bothwell
- Brant North
- Brant South
- Brockville
- Bruce North
- Bruce South
- Cardwell
- Carleton
- Cornwall
- Dundas
- Durham East
- Durham West
- Elgin East
- Elgin West
- Essex
- Frontenac
- Glengarry
- Grenville South
- Grey East
- Grey North
- Grey South
- Haldimand
- Halton
- Hamilton*
- Hastings East
- Hastings North
- Hastings West
- Huron Centre
- Huron North
- Huron South
- Kent
- Kingston
- Lambton
- Lanark North
- Lanark South
- Leeds North and Grenville North
- Leeds South
- Lennox
- Lincoln
- London
- Middlesex East
- Middlesex North
- Middlesex West
- Monck
- Muskoka
- Niagara
- Norfolk North
- Norfolk South
- Northumberland East
- Northumberland West
- Ontario North
- Ontario South
- Ottawa (City of)*
- Oxford North
- Oxford South
- Peel
- Perth North
- Perth South
- Peterborough East
- Peterborough West
- Prescott
- Prince Edward
- Renfrew North
- Renfrew South
- Russell
- Simcoe North
- Simcoe South
- Stormont
- Toronto Centre
- Toronto East
- Victoria North
- Victoria South
- Waterloo North
- Waterloo South
- Welland
- Wellington Centre
- Wellington North
- Wellington South
- Wentworth North
- Wentworth South
- West Toronto
- York East
- York North
- York West

== Manitoba – 4 seats ==
- Lisgar
- Marquette
- Provencher
- Selkirk

== British Columbia – 6 seats ==
- Cariboo
- New Westminster
- Vancouver
- Victoria*
- Yale
- returned two members

Preceded by Electoral districts 1872–1873	Historical federal electoral districts of Canada	Succeeded by Electoral districts 1882–1886
