= William Perley =

William Perley may refer to:

- William Goodhue Perley, Canadian businessman and member of the House of Commons of Canada
- William E. Perley, farmer, lumberman and political figure in New Brunswick, Canada
- William Dell Perley, farmer and politician from western Canada
