= List of Canadian electoral districts (1966–1976) =

This is a list of electoral districts, or ridings, of Canada for the federal elections of 1968, 1972, and 1974. Electoral Districts are constituencies that elect Members of Parliament in Canada's House of Commons every election.

== Newfoundland – 7 seats ==
- Bonavista—Trinity—Conception
- Burin—Burgeo
- Gander—Twillingate
- Grand Falls—White Bay—Labrador
- Humber—St. George's—St. Barbe
- St. John's East
- St. John's West

== Nova Scotia – 11 seats ==
- Annapolis Valley
- Cape Breton Highlands—Canso
- Cape Breton—East Richmond
- Cape Breton—The Sydneys
- Central Nova
- Cumberland—Colchester North
- Dartmouth—Halifax East
- Halifax
- Halifax—East Hants
- South Shore
- South Western Nova

== Prince Edward Island – 4 seats ==
- Cardigan
- Egmont
- Hillsborough
- Malpeque

== New Brunswick – 10 seats ==
- Carleton—Charlotte
- Fundy—Royal
- Gloucester
- Madawaska—Victoria
- Moncton
- Northumberland—Miramichi
- Restigouche
- Saint John—Lancaster
- Westmorland—Kent
- York—Sunbury

== Quebec – 74 seats ==
- Abitibi
- Ahuntsic
- Argenteuil (renamed Argenteuil—Deux-Montagnes in 1970)
- Beauce
- Beauharnois (renamed Beauharnois—Salaberry in 1971)
- Bellechasse
- Berthier (renamed Berthier—Maskinongé in 1975)
- Bonaventure (renamed Bonaventure—Îles-de-la-Madeleine in 1971)
- Bourassa (renamed Montreal—Bourassa in 1971)
- Chambly
- Champlain
- Charlevoix
- Chicoutimi
- Compton
- Dollard
- Drummond
- Duvernay
- Frontenac
- Gamelin
- Gaspé
- Gatineau
- Hochelaga
- Hull
- Joliette
- Kamouraska
- Labelle
- Lac-Saint-Jean
- Lachine (renamed Lachine—Lakeshore in 1973)
- Lafontaine (renamed Lafontaine—Rosemont in 1975)
- Langelier
- Lapointe
- Laprairie
- Lasalle (renamed Lasalle—Émard—Côte Saint-Paul in 1973)
- Laurier
- Laval
- Lévis
- Longueuil
- Lotbinière
- Louis-Hébert
- Maisonneuve (renamed Maisonneuve—Rosemont in 1970)
- Manicouagan
- Matane
- Mercier
- Missisquoi (renamed Brome—Missisquoi in 1970)
- Montmorency
- Mount Royal
- Notre-Dame-de-Grâce
- Outremont
- Papineau
- Pontiac
- Portneuf
- Québec-Est
- Richelieu
- Richmond
- Rimouski
- Roberval
- Saint-Denis
- Saint-Henri
- Saint-Hyacinthe
- Saint-Jacques
- Saint-Jean
- Saint-Maurice
- Saint-Michel
- Sainte-Marie
- Shefford
- Sherbrooke
- Témiscamingue
- Témiscouata (renamed Rivière-du-Loup—Témiscouata in 1972)
- Terrebonne
- Trois-Rivières (renamed Trois-Rivières Métropolitain in 1972)
- Vaudreuil
- Verdun
- Villeneuve
- Westmount

== Ontario – 88 seats ==
- Algoma
- Brant
- Broadview
- Bruce (renamed Bruce—Grey in 1975)
- Cochrane
- Davenport
- Don Valley
- Eglinton
- Elgin
- Essex (renamed Essex—Windsor in 1972)
- Etobicoke
- Fort William
- Frontenac—Lennox and Addington
- Glengarry—Prescott (renamed Glengarry—Prescott—Russell in 1970)
- Greenwood
- Grenville—Carleton
- Grey—Simcoe
- Halton—Wentworth
- Hamilton East
- Hamilton Mountain
- Hamilton West
- Hamilton—Wentworth
- Hastings
- High Park (renamed High Park—Humber Valley in 1972)
- Huron (renamed Huron—Middlesex in 1974)
- Kenora—Rainy River
- Kent—Essex
- Kingston and the Islands
- Kitchener
- Lakeshore (renamed Toronto—Lakeshore in 1971)
- Lambton—Kent
- Lanark and Renfrew (renamed Lanark–Renfrew–Carleton in 1970)
- Leeds
- Lincoln
- London East
- London West
- Middlesex (renamed Middlesex—London—Lambton in 1974)
- Niagara Falls
- Nickel Belt
- Nipissing
- Norfolk—Haldimand
- Northumberland—Durham
- Ontario
- Oshawa—Whitby (Oshawa prior to 1967)
- Ottawa Centre
- Ottawa East (renamed Ottawa—Vanier in 1973)
- Ottawa West
- Ottawa—Carleton
- Oxford
- Parkdale
- Parry Sound—Muskoka
- Peel South (renamed Mississauga in 1973)
- Peel—Dufferin—Simcoe (Peel—Dufferin prior to 1967)
- Perth (renamed Perth—Wilmot in 1970)
- Peterborough
- Port Arthur
- Prince Edward—Hastings
- Renfrew North (renamed Renfrew North—Nipissing East in 1972)
- Rosedale
- Sarnia (renamed Sarnia—Lambton in 1970)
- Sault Ste. Marie
- Scarborough East
- Scarborough West
- Simcoe North
- Spadina
- St. Catharines
- St. Paul's
- Stormont—Dundas
- Sudbury
- Thunder Bay
- Timiskaming
- Timmins
- Trinity
- Victoria—Haliburton
- Waterloo (renamed Waterloo—Cambridge in 1973)
- Welland
- Wellington
- Wellington—Grey (renamed Wellington—Grey—Dufferin—Waterloo in 1970)
- Windsor West
- Windsor—Walkerville
- York Centre
- York East
- York North
- York South
- York West
- York—Scarborough
- York—Simcoe

== Manitoba – 13 seats ==
- Brandon—Souris
- Churchill
- Dauphin
- Lisgar
- Marquette
- Portage
- Provencher
- Selkirk
- St. Boniface
- Winnipeg North
- Winnipeg North Centre
- Winnipeg South
- Winnipeg South Centre

== Saskatchewan – 13 seats ==
- Assiniboia
- Battleford—Kindersley
- Mackenzie
- Meadow Lake
- Moose Jaw
- Prince Albert
- Qu'Appelle—Moose Mountain
- Regina East
- Regina—Lake Centre
- Saskatoon—Biggar
- Saskatoon—Humboldt
- Swift Current—Maple Creek
- Yorkton—Melville

== Alberta – 19 seats ==
- Athabasca
- Battle River
- Calgary Centre
- Calgary North
- Calgary South
- Crowfoot
- Edmonton Centre
- Edmonton East
- Edmonton West
- Edmonton—Strathcona
- Lethbridge
- Medicine Hat
- Palliser
- Peace River
- Pembina
- Red Deer
- Rocky Mountain
- Vegreville
- Wetaskiwin

== British Columbia – 23 seats ==
- Burnaby—Richmond (renamed Burnaby—Richmond—Delta in 1970)
- Burnaby—Seymour
- Capilano
- Coast Chilcotin
- Comox—Alberni
- Esquimalt—Saanich
- Fraser Valley East
- Fraser Valley West
- Kamloops—Cariboo
- Kootenay West
- Nanaimo—Cowichan—The Islands
- New Westminster
- Okanagan Boundary
- Okanagan—Kootenay
- Prince George—Peace River
- Skeena
- Surrey (renamed Surrey—White Rock in 1971)
- Vancouver Centre
- Vancouver East
- Vancouver Kingsway
- Vancouver Quadra
- Vancouver South
- Victoria

== Northwest Territories – 1 seat ==
- Northwest Territories

== Yukon – 1 seat ==
- Yukon

Preceded by Electoral districts 1952–1966	Historical federal electoral districts of Canada	Succeeded by Electoral districts 1976–1987
