= List of Canadian electoral districts (2013–2023) =

This is a list of the Canadian electoral districts used between 2013 and 2023. According to the 2023 Representation Orders, this list of electoral districts would be adopted for any general elections called before April 23, 2024. During this period, the House of Commons of Canada had 338 seats. This arrangement was used in the 2015 federal election, the 2019 federal election and the 2021 federal election.

On October 27, 2011, the Conservative government proposed Bill C-20, a measure that would expand the House of Commons from 308 to 338 seats, with 15 additional seats for Ontario, 6 additional seats each for Alberta and British Columbia, and 3 for Quebec. This follows two previous measures to expand the chamber. The new electoral districts came into effect for the 2015 federal election.

There are four districts established by the British North America Act 1867 that have existed continuously without changes to their names or being abolished and reconstituted as a riding due to redistricting: Beauce (Quebec), Halifax (Nova Scotia), Shefford (Quebec), and Simcoe North (Ontario). These districts, however, have undergone territorial changes since their inception.

Map of the ridings, showing major city areas as insets

== Alberta – 34 seats ==
- Banff—Airdrie
- Battle River—Crowfoot
- Bow River
- Calgary Centre
- Calgary Confederation
- Calgary Forest Lawn
- Calgary Heritage
- Calgary Midnapore
- Calgary Nose Hill
- Calgary Rocky Ridge
- Calgary Shepard
- Calgary Signal Hill
- Calgary Skyview
- Edmonton Centre
- Edmonton Griesbach
- Edmonton Manning
- Edmonton Mill Woods
- Edmonton Riverbend
- Edmonton Strathcona
- Edmonton West
- Edmonton—Wetaskiwin
- Foothills
- Fort McMurray—Cold Lake
- Grande Prairie—Mackenzie
- Lakeland
- Lethbridge
- Medicine Hat—Cardston—Warner
- Peace River—Westlock
- Red Deer—Lacombe
- Red Deer—Mountain View
- Sherwood Park—Fort Saskatchewan
- St. Albert—Edmonton
- Sturgeon River—Parkland
- Yellowhead

== British Columbia – 42 seats ==
- Abbotsford
- Burnaby North—Seymour
- Burnaby South
- Cariboo—Prince George
- Central Okanagan—Similkameen—Nicola
- Chilliwack—Hope
- Cloverdale—Langley City
- Coquitlam—Port Coquitlam
- Courtenay—Alberni
- Cowichan—Malahat—Langford
- Delta
- Esquimalt—Saanich—Sooke
- Fleetwood—Port Kells
- Kamloops—Thompson—Cariboo
- Kelowna—Lake Country
- Kootenay—Columbia
- Langley—Aldergrove
- Mission—Matsqui—Fraser Canyon
- Nanaimo—Ladysmith
- New Westminster—Burnaby
- North Island—Powell River
- North Okanagan—Shuswap
- North Vancouver
- Pitt Meadows—Maple Ridge
- Port Moody—Coquitlam
- Prince George—Peace River—Northern Rockies
- Richmond Centre
- Saanich—Gulf Islands
- Skeena—Bulkley Valley
- South Okanagan—West Kootenay
- South Surrey—White Rock
- Steveston—Richmond East
- Surrey Centre
- Surrey—Newton
- Vancouver Centre
- Vancouver East
- Vancouver Granville
- Vancouver Kingsway
- Vancouver Quadra
- Vancouver South
- Victoria
- West Vancouver—Sunshine Coast—Sea to Sky Country

== Manitoba – 14 seats ==
- Brandon—Souris
- Charleswood—St. James—Assiniboia—Headingley
- Churchill—Keewatinook Aski
- Dauphin—Swan River—Neepawa
- Elmwood—Transcona
- Kildonan—St. Paul
- Portage—Lisgar
- Provencher
- Saint Boniface—Saint Vital
- Selkirk—Interlake—Eastman
- Winnipeg Centre
- Winnipeg North
- Winnipeg South
- Winnipeg South Centre

== New Brunswick – 10 seats ==
- Acadie—Bathurst
- Beauséjour
- Fredericton
- Fundy Royal
- Madawaska—Restigouche
- Miramichi—Grand Lake
- Moncton—Riverview—Dieppe
- New Brunswick Southwest
- Saint John—Rothesay
- Tobique—Mactaquac

== Newfoundland and Labrador – 7 seats ==
- Avalon
- Bonavista—Burin—Trinity
- Coast of Bays—Central—Notre Dame
- Labrador
- Long Range Mountains
- St. John's East
- St. John's South—Mount Pearl

== Northwest Territories – 1 seat ==
- Northwest Territories

== Nova Scotia – 11 seats ==
- Cape Breton—Canso
- Central Nova
- Cumberland—Colchester
- Dartmouth—Cole Harbour
- Halifax
- Halifax West
- Kings—Hants
- Sackville—Preston—Chezzetcook
- South Shore—St. Margarets
- Sydney—Victoria
- West Nova

== Nunavut – 1 seat ==
- Nunavut

== Ontario – 121 seats ==
- Ajax
- Algoma—Manitoulin—Kapuskasing
- Aurora—Oak Ridges—Richmond Hill
- Barrie—Innisfil
- Barrie—Springwater—Oro-Medonte
- Bay of Quinte
- Beaches—East York
- Brampton Centre
- Brampton East
- Brampton North
- Brampton South
- Brampton West
- Brantford—Brant
- Bruce—Grey—Owen Sound
- Burlington
- Cambridge
- Carleton
- Chatham-Kent—Leamington
- Davenport
- Don Valley East
- Don Valley North
- Don Valley West
- Dufferin—Caledon
- Durham
- Eglinton—Lawrence
- Elgin—Middlesex—London
- Essex
- Etobicoke Centre
- Etobicoke—Lakeshore
- Etobicoke North
- Flamborough—Glanbrook
- Glengarry—Prescott—Russell
- Guelph
- Haldimand—Norfolk
- Haliburton—Kawartha Lakes—Brock
- Hamilton Centre
- Hamilton East—Stoney Creek
- Hamilton Mountain
- Hamilton West—Ancaster—Dundas
- Hastings—Lennox and Addington
- Humber River—Black Creek
- Huron—Bruce
- Kanata—Carleton
- Kenora
- King—Vaughan
- Kingston and the Islands
- Kitchener Centre
- Kitchener—Conestoga
- Kitchener South—Hespeler
- Lambton—Kent—Middlesex
- Lanark—Frontenac—Kingston
- Leeds—Grenville—Thousand Islands and Rideau Lakes
- London—Fanshawe
- London North Centre
- London West
- Markham—Stouffville
- Markham—Thornhill
- Markham—Unionville
- Milton
- Mississauga Centre
- Mississauga East—Cooksville
- Mississauga—Erin Mills
- Mississauga—Lakeshore
- Mississauga—Malton
- Mississauga—Streetsville
- Nepean
- Newmarket—Aurora
- Niagara Centre
- Niagara Falls
- Niagara West
- Nickel Belt
- Nipissing—Timiskaming
- Northumberland—Peterborough South
- Oakville
- Oakville North—Burlington
- Orléans
- Oshawa
- Ottawa Centre
- Ottawa South
- Ottawa—Vanier
- Ottawa West—Nepean
- Oxford
- Parkdale—High Park
- Parry Sound-Muskoka
- Perth Wellington
- Peterborough—Kawartha
- Pickering—Uxbridge
- Renfrew—Nipissing—Pembroke
- Richmond Hill
- St. Catharines
- Sarnia—Lambton
- Sault Ste. Marie
- Scarborough—Agincourt
- Scarborough Centre
- Scarborough—Guildwood
- Scarborough North
- Scarborough—Rouge Park
- Scarborough Southwest
- Simcoe—Grey
- Simcoe North
- Spadina—Fort York
- Stormont—Dundas—South Glengarry
- Sudbury
- Thornhill
- Thunder Bay—Rainy River
- Thunder Bay—Superior North
- Timmins—James Bay
- Toronto Centre
- Toronto—Danforth
- Toronto—St. Paul's
- University—Rosedale
- Vaughan—Woodbridge
- Waterloo
- Wellington—Halton Hills
- Whitby
- Willowdale
- Windsor—Tecumseh
- Windsor West
- York Centre
- York—Simcoe
- York South—Weston

== Prince Edward Island – 4 seats ==
- Cardigan
- Charlottetown
- Egmont
- Malpeque

== Quebec – 78 seats ==
- Abitibi—Baie-James—Nunavik—Eeyou
- Abitibi—Témiscamingue
- Ahuntsic-Cartierville
- Alfred-Pellan
- Argenteuil—La Petite-Nation
- Avignon—La Mitis—Matane—Matapédia
- Beauce
- Beauport—Côte-de-Beaupré—Île d'Orléans—Charlevoix
- Beauport—Limoilou
- Bécancour—Nicolet—Saurel
- Bellechasse—Les Etchemins—Lévis
- Beloeil—Chambly
- Berthier—Maskinongé
- Bourassa
- Brome—Missisquoi
- Brossard—Saint-Lambert
- Charlesbourg—Haute-Saint-Charles
- Châteauguay—Lacolle
- Chicoutimi—Le Fjord
- Compton—Stanstead
- Dorval—Lachine—LaSalle
- Drummond
- Gaspésie—Les Îles-de-la-Madeleine
- Gatineau
- Hochelaga
- Honoré-Mercier
- Hull—Aylmer
- Joliette
- Jonquière
- La Pointe-de-l'Île
- La Prairie
- Lac-Saint-Jean
- Lac-Saint-Louis
- LaSalle—Émard—Verdun
- Laurentides—Labelle
- Laurier—Sainte-Marie
- Laval—Les Îles
- Lévis—Lotbinière
- Longueuil—Charles-LeMoyne
- Longueuil—Saint-Hubert
- Louis-Hébert
- Louis-Saint-Laurent
- Manicouagan
- Marc-Aurèle-Fortin
- Mégantic—L'Érable
- Mirabel
- Montarville
- Montcalm
- Montmagny—L'Islet—Kamouraska—Rivière-du-Loup
- Mount Royal
- Notre-Dame-de-Grâce—Westmount
- Outremont
- Papineau
- Pierre-Boucher—Les Patriotes—Verchères
- Pierrefonds—Dollard
- Pontiac
- Portneuf—Jacques-Cartier
- Québec
- Repentigny
- Richmond—Arthabaska
- Rimouski-Neigette—Témiscouata—Les Basques
- Rivière-des-Mille-Îles
- Rivière-du-Nord
- Rosemont—La Petite-Patrie
- Saint-Hyacinthe—Bagot
- Saint-Jean
- Saint-Laurent
- Saint-Léonard—Saint-Michel
- Saint-Maurice—Champlain
- Salaberry—Suroît
- Shefford
- Sherbrooke
- Terrebonne
- Thérèse-De Blainville
- Trois-Rivières
- Vaudreuil—Soulanges
- Ville-Marie–Le Sud-Ouest–Île-des-Sœurs
- Vimy

== Saskatchewan – 14 seats ==
- Battlefords—Lloydminster
- Carlton Trail—Eagle Creek
- Cypress Hills—Grasslands
- Desnethé—Missinippi—Churchill River
- Moose Jaw—Lake Centre—Lanigan
- Prince Albert
- Regina—Lewvan
- Regina—Qu'Appelle
- Regina—Wascana
- Saskatoon—Grasswood
- Saskatoon—University
- Saskatoon West
- Souris—Moose Mountain
- Yorkton—Melville

== Yukon – 1 seat ==
- Yukon

== See also ==
- Historical federal electoral districts of Canada
- Population of Canadian federal ridings
- Canadian provincial electoral districts
- 2012 Canadian federal electoral redistribution
- 2022 Canadian federal electoral redistribution

Preceded by Electoral districts 2003–2013	Past Canadian electoral districts	Succeeded by Electoral districts 2023–present
