= Toronto—High Park =

Former federal electoral district in Ontario, Canada

Ontario electoral district

Defunct federal electoral district
- Legislature: House of Commons
- District created: 1924
- District abolished: 1933
- First contested: 1925
- Last contested: 1930

Toronto—High Park was a federal electoral district represented in the House of Commons of Canada from 1925 to 1935. It was located in the west end of the city of Toronto in the province of Ontario. This riding was created in 1924 from parts of Parkdale riding.

It was defined as consisting of the part of the city of Toronto west of Sunnyside Avenue, Howard Park Avenue, Indian Road, Bloor Street and Lansdowne Avenue, up to the Canadian Pacific Railway, and from there to the northern division of the Canadian National Railway, and from there to the north boundary of the city.

The electoral district was abolished in 1933 when it was redistributed between High Park, Parkdale, and York West ridings.

== Members of Parliament ==
This riding has elected the following members of Parliament:

| Parliament | Years | Member | Party |
|---|---|---|---|
Riding created from Parkdale
| 15th | 1925–1926 | Alexander James Anderson | Conservative |
| 16th | 1926–1930 | Alexander James Anderson | Conservative |
| 17th | 1930–1935 | Alexander James Anderson | Conservative |
Riding dissolved into High Park, Parkdale and York West

== Election history ==
1925 Canadian federal election: Toronto—High Park
| Party | Candidate | Votes | % | ±% |
|---|---|---|---|---|
| Conservative | Alexander James Anderson | 15,809 | | |
| Liberal | Hon. James Murdock | 5,465 | | |

1926 Canadian federal election: Toronto—High Park
| Party | Candidate | Votes | % | ±% |
|---|---|---|---|---|
| Conservative | Alexander James Anderson | 12,366 | | |
| Liberal | Hon. James Murdock | 4,167 | | |

1930 Canadian federal election: Toronto—High Park
| Party | Candidate | Votes | % | ±% |
|---|---|---|---|---|
| Conservative | Alexander James Anderson | 11,807 | | |
| Liberal | Aubrey Albert Bond | 5,765 | | |

== See also ==
- List of Canadian electoral districts
- Historical federal electoral districts of Canada
