= Walter Deakon =

Canadian politician (1924–1982)

Walter Cyril Deakon

Member of Parliament for High Park
- In office June 1968 – September 1972
- Preceded by: Pat Cameron
- Succeeded by: riding abolished

Personal details
- Born: 24 May 1924 Edmonton, Alberta, Canada
- Died: 5 October 1982 (aged 58) Mississauga, Ontario, Canada
- Party: Liberal
- Spouse(s): Olga Zawaski (m. 20 February 1970)
- Education: Ryerson Polytechnical Institute, University of Toronto, Osgoode Hall Law School
- Profession: barrister/solicitor, professional engineer

Walter Cyril Deakon (24 May 1924 – 5 October 1982) was a Liberal party member of the House of Commons of Canada. He was born in Edmonton, Alberta and became a barrister, solicitor and professional engineer by career.

Deakon was a member of the Royal Canadian Air Force from 1943 to 1945 during World War II. He studied at Ryerson Polytechnical Institute, University of Toronto and the Osgoode Hall Law School, attaining Bachelor of Applied Science and Professional Engineer degrees.

He was first elected in the High Park riding in the 1968 general election. Deakon served only one term in office, the 28th Canadian Parliament, before being defeated in the 1972 election by Otto Jelinek of the Progressive Conservative party as the riding then became known as High Park—Humber Valley.
