= William Alexander McMaster =

Canadian politician

Member of Parliament for High Park
- In office 1945–1949
- Preceded by: Alexander James Anderson
- Succeeded by: Pat Cameron

Personal details
- Born: 1879 near London, Ontario, Canada
- Died: March 4, 1961
- Party: Conservative
- Profession: Lawyer

William Alexander McMaster, MC QC (1879 - March 4, 1961) was a Canadian parliamentarian and lawyer.

McMaster was born near London, Ontario and attended Osgoode Hall Law School in Toronto from which he graduated in 1902 and qualified as a lawyer. He served in World War I with the Third Toronto Regiment in France, attaining the rank of Major and being awarded the Military Cross and bar.

He joined the Progressive Conservative Party of Canada in 1943 and was elected to the House of Commons of Canada from High Park in Toronto in the 1945 federal election. He served in Parliament for four years until his defeat in the 1949 federal election.
