= Raymond Ducharme Morand =

Canadian politician

The Honourable Raymond Ducharme Morand PC

Member of the Canadian Parliament for Essex East
- In office July 28, 1930 – October 13, 1935
- Preceded by: Edmond George Odette
- Succeeded by: Paul Martin Sr.
- In office October 29, 1925 – September 13, 1926
- Preceded by: None
- Succeeded by: Edmond George Odette

Personal details
- Born: January 30, 1887 Windsor, Ontario
- Died: February 2, 1952 (aged 65)
- Party: Conservative
- Profession: Lecturer, physician
- Cabinet: Minister Without Portfolio (1926); Minister presiding over the Department of Health (Acting) (1926); Minister of Soldiers' Civil Re-establishment (Acting) (1926)
- Portfolio: Deputy Speaker and Chairman of Committees of the Whole of the House of Commons (1935)

Raymond Ducharme Morand, PC (January 30, 1887 – February 2, 1952) was a Canadian politician.

Born in Windsor, Ontario, he was first elected to the House of Commons of Canada for the riding of Essex East in the 1925 federal election. A Conservative, he was defeated in the 1926 election. He was re-elected in the 1930 federal election and was defeated in 1935 and 1940. In 1926, he was a minister without portfolio, minister presiding over the Department of Health (acting), and Minister of Soldiers' Civil Re-establishment (acting) in the short-lived cabinet of Arthur Meighen. In 1935, he was the deputy speaker and chairman of committees of the whole of the House of Commons.
