= Edmond George Odette =

Canadian politician

Member of Parliament for Essex East
- In office September 1926 – May 1930
- Preceded by: Raymond Morand
- Succeeded by: Raymond Morand

Personal details
- Born: Edmond George Odette; 22 May 1884 Windsor, Ontario
- Died: 31 March 1939 (aged 54)
- Party: Liberal
- Spouse(s): Beatrice E. Hobson m. 1 January 1905
- Profession: Industrialist

Edmond George Odette (22 May 1884 – 31 March 1939) was a Liberal party member of the House of Commons of Canada. He was born in Windsor, Ontario and became an industrialist.

Odette attended public school in Windsor, then Assomption College at nearby Sandwich. He became president of manufacturing firm Canadian Top and Body Corporation of Tilbury, Ontario. He was also vice-president of Golf Ball Corporation of Canada, vice-president of Canadian Deepwaterways and Power Association and a director of Northward Mines Ltd.

From 1920 to 1923, Odette was mayor of Tilbury, Ontario and in 1924 was the community's reeve.

He unsuccessfully attempted to win the Essex East riding in the 1925 federal election. In the 1926 general election, Odette defeated Conservative incumbent Raymond Ducharme Morand. After serving his only term in the House of Commons, Morand defeated Odette in the 1930 election. Odette became Chief Commission of the Liquor Control Board of Ontario in 1934.
