= John Kucherepa =

Canadian politician

John William Kucherepa

Alderman of Toronto City Council, Ward 7
- In office 1952 – January 1958

Member of Parliament for High Park
- In office June 1957 – June 1962
- Preceded by: Pat Cameron
- Succeeded by: Pat Cameron

Personal details
- Born: 27 May 1919 Toronto, Ontario
- Died: 25 March 1990 (aged 70) Etobicoke, Ontario
- Party: Progressive Conservative
- Profession: physician

John William Kucherepa (27 May 1919 – 25 March 1990) was a Progressive Conservative party member of the House of Commons of Canada.

Kucherepa was born in Toronto, Ontario where he attended the Humberside Collegiate Institute and Western High School of Commerce in his youth. He then studied medicine at the University of Toronto during which time he served in World War II under the Royal Canadian Army Medical Corps for two years.

In 1952, after establishing a medical practice in Toronto's High Park neighbourhood, Kucherepa became the Ward 7 member of Toronto's city council. While he was still a city alderman, he campaigned in the 1957 federal election, winning the High Park riding. After some tension sitting as both a Member of Parliament and a city alderman, he resigned from Toronto City Council in January 1958. Between 1956 and 1958, Kucherepa was also the Ukrainian Council of Canada's president following years of service in Toronto's Ukrainian community.

Kucherepa was re-elected for a second term at High Park in the 1958 election, but was defeated in the 1962 election by Pat Cameron of the Liberal party, from whom he won the riding in 1957.

After his federal defeat, Kucherepa joined the Ontario College of Physicians and Surgeons as a licensing officer and remained active in that role until 1984. He also joined the Toronto Planning Board in 1964, becoming its chairman in 1971.

Kucherepa died of cancer at Etobicoke General Hospital on 25 March 1990 aged 70.
