= List of Canadian electoral districts (1976–1987) =

This is a list of electoral districts or ridings in Canada for the Canadian federal elections of 1979, 1980, and 1984.

Electoral Districts are constituencies that elect Members of Parliament in Canada's House of Commons every election.

== Newfoundland – 7 seats ==
- Bonavista—Trinity—Conception
- Burin—St. George's
- Gander—Twillingate
- Grand Falls—White Bay—Labrador
- Humber—Port au Port—St. Barbe (Humber—St. Barbe prior to 1978)
- St. John's East
- St. John's West

== Nova Scotia – 11 seats ==
- Annapolis Valley—Hants
- Cape Breton Highlands—Canso
- Cape Breton—East Richmond
- Cape Breton—The Sydneys
- Central Nova
- Cumberland—Colchester
- Dartmouth—Halifax East
- Halifax
- Halifax West
- South Shore
- South West Nova

== Prince Edward Island – 4 seats ==
- Cardigan
- Egmont
- Hillsborough
- Malpeque

== New Brunswick – 10 seats ==
- Carleton—Charlotte
- Fundy—Royal
- Gloucester
- Madawaska—Victoria
- Moncton
- Northumberland—Miramichi
- Restigouche
- Saint John
- Westmorland—Kent
- York—Sunbury

== Quebec – 75 seats ==
- Abitibi
- Argenteuil (renamed Argenteuil—Papineau in 1980)
- Beauce
- Beauharnois—Salaberry (Beauharnois prior to 1977)
- Bellechasse
- Berthier—Maskinongé (renamed Berthier—Maskinongé—Lanaudière in 1980)
- Blainville—Deux-Montagnes (Deux-Montagnes prior to 1977)
- Bonaventure—Îles-de-la-Madeleine
- Bourassa
- Chambly
- Champlain
- Charlesbourg
- Charlevoix
- Châteauguay
- Chicoutimi
- Dollard
- Drummond
- Duvernay
- Frontenac
- Gamelin
- Gaspé
- Gatineau
- Hochelaga—Maisonneuve (Maisonneuve prior to 1978)
- Hull (renamed Hull—Aylmer in 1984)
- Joliette
- Jonquière
- Kamouraska—Rivière-du-Loup
- Labelle
- Lac-Saint-Jean
- Lachine
- Langelier
- Laprairie (renamed La Prairie in 1980)
- Lasalle
- Laurier
- Laval (Mille-Iles prior to 1977)
- Laval-des-Rapides
- Lévis
- Longueuil
- Lotbinière
- Louis-Hébert
- Manicouagan
- Matapédia—Matane
- Mégantic—Compton—Stanstead (Compton prior to 1978)
- Mercier (renamed Montreal—Mercier in 1980)
- Missisquoi (renamed Brome—Missisquoi in 1983)
- Montmorency (renamed Montmorency—Orléans in 1980)
- Mount Royal
- Notre-Dame-de-Grâce (renamed Notre-Dame-de-Grâce—Lachine East in 1980)
- Outremont
- Papineau
- Pontiac—Gatineau—Labelle (Pontiac prior to 1978)
- Portneuf
- Québec-Est
- Richelieu
- Richmond (renamed Richmond—Wolfe in 1980)
- Rimouski (renamed Rimouski—Témiscouata in 1980)
- Roberval
- Rosemont
- Saint-Denis
- Saint-Henri—Westmount (Westmount prior to 1978)
- Saint-Hyacinthe (renamed Saint-Hyacinthe—Bagot in 1980)
- Saint-Jacques (Saint-Henri prior to 1977)
- Saint-Jean
- Saint-Léonard—Anjou (Saint-Léonard prior to 1977)
- Saint-Maurice
- Saint-Michel (renamed Saint-Michel—Ahuntsic in 1983)
- Sainte-Marie (Hochelga prior to 1978. Renamed Montreal—Sainte-Marie in 1980)
- Shefford
- Sherbrooke
- Témiscamingue
- Terrebonne
- Trois-Rivières
- Vaudreuil
- Verchères
- Verdun (renamed Verdun—Saint-Paul in 1980)

== Ontario – 95 seats ==
- Algoma
- Beaches
- Brampton—Georgetown (Brampton—Halton Hills prior to 1977)
- Brant
- Broadview—Greenwood
- Bruce—Grey
- Burlington
- Cambridge
- Cochrane (Cochrane North prior to 1977. Renamed Cochrane—Superior in 1980)
- Davenport
- Don Valley East
- Don Valley West
- Durham—Northumberland
- Eglinton—Lawrence
- Elgin
- Erie
- Essex—Kent
- Essex—Windsor
- Etobicoke Centre
- Etobicoke North
- Etobicoke—Lakeshore
- Glengarry—Prescott—Russell
- Grey—Simcoe
- Guelph
- Haldimand—Norfolk
- Halton
- Hamilton East
- Hamilton Mountain
- Hamilton West
- Hamilton—Wentworth
- Hastings—Frontenac (renamed Hastings—Frontenac—Lennox and Addington in 1981)
- Huron—Bruce (Huron prior to 1977)
- Kenora—Rainy River
- Kent
- Kingston and the Islands
- Kitchener
- Lambton—Middlesex
- Lanark—Renfrew—Carleton
- Leeds—Grenville
- Lincoln
- London East
- London West
- London—Middlesex (Middlesex East prior to 1977)
- Mississauga North
- Mississauga South
- Nepean—Carleton
- Niagara Falls
- Nickel Belt
- Nipissing
- Northumberland
- Ontario
- Oshawa
- Ottawa Centre
- Ottawa West
- Ottawa—Carleton
- Ottawa—Vanier
- Oxford
- Parkdale—High Park
- Parry Sound—Muskoka
- Perth
- Peterborough
- Prince Edward—Hastings (Prince Edward prior to 1978)
- Renfrew—Nipissing—Pembroke
- Rosedale
- Sarnia (renamed Sarnia—Lambton in 1981)
- Sault Ste. Marie
- Scarborough Centre
- Scarborough East
- Scarborough West
- Simcoe North
- Simcoe South
- Spadina
- St. Catharines
- St. Paul's
- Stormont—Dundas
- Sudbury
- Thunder Bay—Atikokan
- Thunder Bay—Nipigon
- Timiskaming
- Timmins—Chapleau
- Trinity
- Victoria—Haliburton
- Waterloo
- Welland
- Wellington—Dufferin—Simcoe (Dufferin—Wellington prior to 1977)
- Windsor West
- Windsor—Walkerville
- York Centre
- York East
- York North
- York South—Weston
- York West
- York—Peel
- York—Scarborough

== Manitoba – 14 seats ==
- Brandon—Souris
- Churchill
- Dauphin (renamed Dauphin—Swan River in 1983)
- Lisgar
- Portage—Marquette
- Provencher
- Selkirk—Interlake
- St. Boniface
- Winnipeg North
- Winnipeg North Centre
- Winnipeg—Assiniboine
- Winnipeg—Birds Hill
- Winnipeg—Fort Garry
- Winnipeg—St. James

== Saskatchewan – 14 seats ==
- Assiniboia
- Humboldt—Lake Centre
- Kindersley—Lloydminster
- Mackenzie
- Moose Jaw
- Prince Albert
- Qu'Appelle—Moose Mountain
- Regina East
- Regina West
- Saskatoon East
- Saskatoon West
- Swift Current—Maple Creek
- The Battlefords—Meadow Lake
- Yorkton—Melville

== Alberta – 21 seats ==
- Athabasca
- Bow River
- Calgary Centre
- Calgary East
- Calgary North
- Calgary South
- Calgary West
- Crowfoot
- Edmonton East
- Edmonton North
- Edmonton South
- Edmonton West
- Edmonton—Strathcona
- Lethbridge—Foothills (Lethbridge prior to 1977)
- Medicine Hat
- Peace River
- Pembina
- Red Deer
- Vegreville
- Wetaskiwin
- Yellowhead

== British Columbia – 28 seats ==
- Burnaby
- Capilano
- Cariboo—Chilcotin
- Comox—Powell River
- Cowichan—Malahat—The Islands
- Esquimalt—Saanich
- Fraser Valley East
- Fraser Valley West
- Kamloops—Shuswap
- Kootenay East—Revelstoke (Kootenay East prior to 1977)
- Kootenay West
- Mission—Port Moody
- Nanaimo—Alberni
- New Westminster—Coquitlam
- North Vancouver—Burnaby
- Okanagan North
- Okanagan—Similkameen
- Prince George—Bulkley Valley
- Prince George—Peace River (Fort Nelson—Peace River prior to 1978)
- Richmond—South Delta
- Skeena
- Surrey—White Rock—North Delta
- Vancouver Centre
- Vancouver East
- Vancouver Kingsway
- Vancouver Quadra
- Vancouver South
- Victoria

== Northwest Territories – 2 seats ==
- Nunatsiaq
- Western Arctic

== Yukon – 1 seat ==
- Yukon

Preceded by Electoral districts 1966–1976	Historical federal electoral districts of Canada	Succeeded by Electoral districts 1987–1996
