= List of Canadian electoral districts (2003–2013) =

This is a list of the Canadian electoral districts used between 2003 and 2013. During this period, the House of Commons of Canada had 308 seats. This arrangement was used in the 2004 federal election, the 2006 federal election, the 2008 federal election and the 2011 federal election.

== Alberta — 28 seats ==
Map of Canadian federal ridings in the 2008 election.

- Calgary Centre (Calgary South Centre before 2004)
- Calgary Centre-North (Calgary North Centre before 2004)
- Calgary East
- Calgary Northeast
- Calgary—Nose Hill
- Calgary Southeast
- Calgary Southwest
- Calgary West
- Crowfoot
- Edmonton Centre
- Edmonton East
- Edmonton—Leduc
- Edmonton—Mill Woods—Beaumont (Edmonton—Beaumont before 2004)
- Edmonton—St. Albert
- Edmonton—Sherwood Park
- Edmonton—Spruce Grove
- Edmonton—Strathcona
- Fort McMurray—Athabasca (Athabasca before 2004)
- Lethbridge
- Macleod
- Medicine Hat
- Peace River
- Red Deer
- Vegreville—Wainwright
- Westlock—St. Paul (briefly Battle River in 2004-2005)
- Wetaskiwin
- Wild Rose
- Yellowhead

== British Columbia — 36 seats ==
- Abbotsford
- British Columbia Southern Interior (Southern Interior before 2004)
- Burnaby—Douglas
- Burnaby—New Westminster
- Cariboo—Prince George
- Chilliwack—Fraser Canyon
- Delta—Richmond East
- Esquimalt—Juan de Fuca
- Fleetwood—Port Kells
- Kamloops—Thompson—Cariboo (Kamloops—Thompson before 2004)
- Kelowna—Lake Country (Kelowna before 2004)
- Kootenay—Columbia
- Langley
- Nanaimo—Alberni
- Nanaimo—Cowichan
- Newton—North Delta
- New Westminster—Coquitlam
- North Vancouver
- Okanagan—Coquihalla
- Okanagan—Shuswap (North Okanagan—Shuswap before 2004)
- Pitt Meadows—Maple Ridge—Mission (Dewdney—Alouette before 2004)
- Port Moody—Westwood—Port Coquitlam
- Prince George—Peace River
- Richmond
- Saanich—Gulf Islands
- Skeena—Bulkley Valley
- South Surrey—White Rock—Cloverdale
- Surrey North
- Vancouver Centre
- Vancouver East
- Vancouver Island North
- Vancouver Kingsway
- Vancouver Quadra
- Vancouver South
- Victoria
- West Vancouver—Sunshine Coast—Sea to Sky Country (West Vancouver—Sunshine Coast before 2004)

== Manitoba — 14 seats ==
- Brandon—Souris
- Charleswood—St. James—Assiniboia (Charleswood—St. James before 2004)
- Churchill
- Dauphin—Swan River—Marquette (Dauphin—Swan River before 2004)
- Elmwood—Transcona
- Kildonan—St. Paul
- Portage—Lisgar
- Provencher
- Saint Boniface
- Selkirk—Interlake
- Winnipeg Centre
- Winnipeg North
- Winnipeg South
- Winnipeg South Centre

== New Brunswick — 10 seats ==
- Acadie—Bathurst
- Beauséjour
- Fredericton
- Fundy Royal (Fundy before 2004)
- Madawaska—Restigouche
- Miramichi
- Moncton—Riverview—Dieppe
- New Brunswick Southwest (St. Croix—Belleisle before 2004)
- Saint John
- Tobique—Mactaquac

== Newfoundland and Labrador — 7 seats ==
- Avalon
- Bonavista—Gander—Grand Falls—Windsor (Bonavista—Exploits before 2004)
- Humber—St. Barbe—Baie Verte
- Labrador
- Random—Burin—St. George's
- St. John's East (St. John's North before 2004)
- St. John's South—Mount Pearl (St. John's South before 2004)

== Northwest Territories — 1 seat ==
- Northwest Territories (Western Arctic until 2014)

== Nova Scotia — 11 seats ==
- Cape Breton—Canso
- Central Nova
- Cumberland—Colchester—Musquodoboit Valley (North Nova before 2004)
- Dartmouth—Cole Harbour
- Halifax
- Halifax West
- Kings—Hants
- Sackville—Eastern Shore
- South Shore—St. Margaret's
- Sydney—Victoria
- West Nova

== Nunavut — 1 seat ==
- Nunavut

== Ontario — 106 seats ==
- Ajax—Pickering
- Algoma—Manitoulin—Kapuskasing
- Ancaster—Dundas—Flamborough—Westdale
- Barrie
- Beaches—East York
- Bramalea—Gore—Malton
- Brampton—Springdale
- Brampton West
- Brant
- Bruce—Grey—Owen Sound (Grey—Bruce—Owen Sound before 2004)
- Burlington
- Cambridge
- Carleton—Mississippi Mills (Carleton—Lanark before 2004)
- Chatham-Kent—Essex
- Davenport
- Don Valley East
- Don Valley West
- Dufferin—Caledon
- Durham (Clarington—Scugog—Uxbridge before 2004)
- Eglinton—Lawrence
- Elgin—Middlesex—London
- Essex
- Etobicoke Centre
- Etobicoke—Lakeshore
- Etobicoke North
- Glengarry—Prescott—Russell
- Guelph
- Haldimand—Norfolk
- Haliburton—Kawartha Lakes—Brock
- Halton
- Hamilton Centre
- Hamilton East—Stoney Creek
- Hamilton Mountain
- Huron—Bruce
- Kenora
- Kingston and the Islands
- Kitchener Centre
- Kitchener—Conestoga (briefly Kitchener—Wilmot—Wellesley—Woolwich in 2004-2005)
- Kitchener—Waterloo
- Lambton—Kent—Middlesex (Middlesex—Kent—Lambton before 2004)
- Lanark—Frontenac—Lennox and Addington
- Leeds—Grenville
- London—Fanshawe
- London North Centre
- London West
- Markham—Unionville
- Mississauga—Brampton South
- Mississauga East—Cooksville
- Mississauga—Erindale
- Mississauga South
- Mississauga—Streetsville
- Nepean—Carleton
- Newmarket—Aurora
- Niagara Falls
- Niagara West—Glanbrook
- Nickel Belt
- Nipissing—Timiskaming
- Northumberland—Quinte West
- Oak Ridges—Markham
- Oakville
- Oshawa
- Ottawa Centre
- Ottawa—Orléans
- Ottawa South
- Ottawa—Vanier
- Ottawa West—Nepean
- Oxford
- Parkdale—High Park
- Parry Sound-Muskoka
- Perth Wellington
- Peterborough
- Pickering—Scarborough East
- Prince Edward—Hastings
- Renfrew—Nipissing—Pembroke
- Richmond Hill
- St. Catharines
- St. Paul's
- Sarnia—Lambton
- Sault Ste. Marie
- Scarborough—Agincourt
- Scarborough Centre
- Scarborough-Guildwood
- Scarborough—Rouge River
- Scarborough Southwest
- Simcoe—Grey
- Simcoe North
- Stormont—Dundas—South Glengarry
- Sudbury
- Thornhill
- Thunder Bay—Rainy River
- Thunder Bay—Superior North
- Timmins-James Bay
- Toronto Centre
- Toronto—Danforth
- Trinity—Spadina
- Vaughan
- Welland
- Wellington—Halton Hills
- Whitby—Oshawa
- Willowdale
- Windsor—Tecumseh
- Windsor West
- York Centre
- York—Simcoe
- York South—Weston
- York West

== Prince Edward Island — 4 seats ==
- Cardigan
- Charlottetown
- Egmont
- Malpeque

== Quebec — 75 seats ==
- Abitibi—Baie-James—Nunavik—Eeyou (Nunavik—Eeyou before 2004)
- Abitibi—Témiscamingue
- Ahuntsic
- Alfred-Pellan
- Argenteuil—Papineau—Mirabel (Argenteuil—Mirabel before 2004)
- Bas-Richelieu—Nicolet—Bécancour (Richelieu before 2004)
- Beauce
- Beauharnois—Salaberry
- Beauport—Limoilou (Beauport before 2004)
- Berthier—Maskinongé
- Bourassa
- Brome—Missisquoi
- Brossard—La Prairie
- Chambly—Borduas
- Charlesbourg—Haute-Saint-Charles (Charlesbourg before 2004)
- Châteauguay—Saint-Constant
- Chicoutimi—Le Fjord
- Compton—Stanstead
- Drummond
- Gaspésie—Îles-de-la-Madeleine
- Gatineau
- Haute-Gaspésie—La Mitis—Matane—Matapédia (Matapédia—Matane before 2004)
- Hochelaga
- Honoré-Mercier
- Hull—Aylmer
- Jeanne-Le Ber
- Joliette
- Jonquière—Alma
- La Pointe-de-l'Île
- Lac-Saint-Louis
- LaSalle—Émard
- Laurentides—Labelle
- Laurier—Sainte-Marie (Laurier before 2004)
- Laval
- Laval—Les Îles
- Lévis—Bellechasse
- Longueuil—Pierre-Boucher (Longueuil before 2004)
- Lotbinière—Chutes-de-la-Chaudière
- Louis-Hébert
- Louis-Saint-Laurent
- Manicouagan
- Marc-Aurèle-Fortin
- Mégantic—L'Érable
- Montcalm
- Montmagny—L'Islet—Kamouraska—Rivière-du-Loup (Rivière-du-Loup—Montmagny before 2004)
- Montmorency—Charlevoix—Haute-Côte-Nord (Charlevoix—Montmorency before 2004)
- Mount Royal
- Notre-Dame-de-Grâce—Lachine
- Outremont
- Papineau
- Pierrefonds—Dollard
- Pontiac
- Portneuf—Jacques-Cartier (Portneuf before 2004)
- Québec
- Repentigny
- Richmond—Arthabaska
- Rimouski-Neigette—Témiscouata—Les Basques (Rimouski—Témiscouata before 2004)
- Rivière-des-Mille-Îles
- Rivière-du-Nord
- Roberval—Lac-Saint-Jean (Roberval before 2004)
- Rosemont—La Petite-Patrie
- Saint-Bruno—Saint-Hubert
- Saint-Hyacinthe—Bagot
- Saint-Jean
- Saint-Lambert
- Saint-Laurent—Cartierville
- Saint-Léonard—Saint-Michel
- Saint-Maurice—Champlain
- Shefford
- Sherbrooke
- Terrebonne—Blainville
- Trois-Rivières
- Vaudreuil-Soulanges
- Verchères—Les Patriotes
- Westmount—Ville-Marie

== Saskatchewan — 14 seats ==
- Battlefords—Lloydminster
- Blackstrap
- Cypress Hills—Grasslands
- Desnethé—Missinippi—Churchill River (Churchill River before 2004)
- Palliser
- Prince Albert
- Regina—Lumsden—Lake Centre
- Regina—Qu'Appelle
- Saskatoon—Humboldt
- Saskatoon—Rosetown—Biggar
- Saskatoon—Wanuskewin
- Souris—Moose Mountain
- Wascana
- Yorkton—Melville

== Yukon — 1 seat ==
- Yukon

Preceded by Electoral districts 1996–2003	Historical federal electoral districts of Canada	Succeeded by List of Canadian electoral districts (2013–2023)
