= Alexander James Anderson =

Canadian politician, barrister and lawyer

Member of Parliament for High Park
- In office 1935–1945
- Preceded by: riding created
- Succeeded by: William Alexander McMaster

Member of Parliament for Toronto—High Park
- In office 1925–1935
- Preceded by: riding created
- Succeeded by: riding abolished

Personal details
- Born: July 1, 1863 Adelaide, Canada West
- Died: June 3, 1946 (aged 82) Toronto
- Party: Conservative
- Profession: barrister, lawyer

Alexander James Anderson (July 1, 1863 – June 3, 1946) was a Canadian politician, barrister and lawyer. He was elected to the House of Commons of Canada as a member of the historical Conservative Party in 1925 representing Toronto—High Park where he was re-elected in 1926 and in 1930. He was also re-elected in the new riding of High Park in 1935 and 1940. He suffered a stroke in December 1944, and died on June 3, 1946 in Toronto.
