= Pat Cameron =

Canadian politician

Alan John Patrick Cameron
- Official 1966 portrait

Member of Parliament for High Park (2nd time)
- In office June 1962 – June 1968
- Preceded by: John Kucherepa
- Succeeded by: Walter Deakon

Member of Parliament for High Park (1st time)
- In office June 1949 – June 1957
- Preceded by: William Alexander McMaster
- Succeeded by: John Kucherepa

Personal details
- Born: 23 September 1895 Brandon, Manitoba, Canada
- Died: 3 January 1982 (aged 86) Etobicoke, Ontario, Canada
- Party: Liberal
- Profession: barrister, lawyer

Alan John Patrick ("Pat") Cameron (23 September 1895 – 3 January 1982) was a Liberal party member of the House of Commons of Canada. He was born in Brandon, Manitoba and became a barrister and lawyer by career.

He was first elected at the High Park riding in the 1949 general election, after two unsuccessful attempts to win the riding in the 1940 and 1945 elections. Cameron was re-elected at High Park for a second term in the 1953, but defeated in the 1957 election by John Kucherepa of the Progressive Conservative party.

After another defeat to Kucherepa in the 1958 election, Cameron regained his High Park Parliamentary seat in 1962 and was re-elected in 1963 and 1965. After completing his final term, the 27th Canadian Parliament, Cameron left federal office and did not campaign in any further national elections.

A neighbour discovered the bodies of both Cameron and his wife Beatrice at their Etobicoke apartment on 3 January 1982. Metro Toronto Police indicated they both died early that day of natural causes.
