= List of Canadian electoral districts (1987–1996) =

This is a list of the Canadian electoral districts used between 1987 and 1996. During this period, the House of Commons had 295 seats. This arrangement was used in the 1988 and 1993 elections.

== Newfoundland – 7 seats ==
- Bonavista—Trinity—Conception
- Burin—St. George's
- Gander—Grand-Falls
- Humber—St. Barbe—Baie Verte
- Labrador
- St. John's East
- St. John's West

== Prince Edward Island – 4 seats ==
- Cardigan
- Egmont
- Hillsborough
- Malpeque

== Nova Scotia – 11 seats ==
- Annapolis Valley—Hants
- Cape Breton Highlands—Canso
- Cape Breton—East Richmond
- Cape Breton—The Sydneys
- Central Nova
- Cumberland—Colchester
- Dartmouth
- Halifax
- Halifax West
- South Shore
- Southwest Nova

== New Brunswick – 10 seats ==
- Acadie—Bathurst (Gloucester prior to 1990)
- Beausejour
- Carleton—Charlotte
- Fredericton—York—Sunbury (Fredericton prior to 1989)
- Fundy—Royal
- Madawaska—Victoria
- Miramichi
- Moncton
- Restigouche—Chaleur (Restigouche prior to 1989)
- Saint John

== Quebec – 75 seats ==
- Abitibi
- Ahuntsic
- Anjou—Rivière-des-Prairies
- Argenteuil—Papineau
- Beauce
- Beauharnois—Salaberry
- Beauport—Montmorency—Orléans (Montmorency—Orléans prior to 1990)
- Bellechasse
- Berthier—Montcalm
- Blainville—Deux-Montagnes
- Bonaventure—Îles-de-la-Madeleine
- Bourassa
- Brome—Missisquoi
- Chambly
- Champlain
- Charlesbourg
- Charlevoix
- Châteauguay
- Chicoutimi
- Drummond
- Frontenac
- Gaspé
- Gatineau—La Lièvre (Chapleau prior to 1988)
- Hochelaga—Maisonneuve
- Hull—Aylmer
- Joliette
- Jonquiere
- Kamouraska—Rivière-du-Loup
- La Prairie
- Lac-Saint-Jean
- Lachine—Lac-Saint-Louis
- LaSalle—Émard
- Laurentides
- Laurier—Sainte-Marie
- Laval Centre (Laval-des-Rapides prior to 1990)
- Laval East (Duvernay prior to 1990)
- Laval West (Laval prior to 1990)
- Lévis
- Longueuil
- Lotbinière
- Louis-Hébert
- Manicouagan
- Matapédia—Matane
- Mégantic—Compton—Stanstead
- Mercier
- Mount Royal
- Notre-Dame-de-Grâce
- Outremont
- Papineau—Saint-Michel
- Pierrefonds—Dollard
- Pontiac—Gatineau—Labelle
- Portneuf
- Québec (Langelier prior to 1990)
- Quebec East
- Richelieu
- Richmond—Wolfe
- Rimouski—Témiscouata
- Roberval
- Rosemont
- Saint-Denis
- Saint-Henri—Westmount
- Saint-Hubert
- Saint-Hyacinthe—Bagot
- Saint-Jean
- Saint-Laurent—Cartierville (Saint-Laurent prior to 1989)
- Saint-Léonard
- Saint-Maurice
- Shefford
- Sherbrooke
- Témiscamingue
- Terrebonne
- Trois-Rivières
- Vaudreuil
- Verchères
- Verdun—Saint-Paul

== Ontario – 99 seats ==
- Algoma—Manitoulin
- Beaches—Woodbine
- Bramalea—Gore—Malton (Brampton—Malton prior to 1990)
- Brampton
- Brant
- Broadview—Greenwood
- Bruce—Grey
- Burlington
- Cambridge
- Carleton—Gloucester
- Cochrane—Superior
- Davenport
- Don Valley East
- Don Valley North
- Don Valley West
- Durham
- Eglinton—Lawrence
- Elgin—Norfolk (Elgin prior to 1990)
- Erie
- Essex-Kent
- Essex-Windsor
- Etobicoke Centre
- Etobicoke North
- Etobicoke—Lakeshore
- Glengarry—Prescott—Russell
- Guelph—Wellington
- Haldimand—Norfolk
- Halton—Peel
- Hamilton East
- Hamilton Mountain
- Hamilton—Wentworth
- Hamilton West
- Hastings—Frontenac—Lennox and Addington
- Huron—Bruce
- Kenora—Rainy River
- Kent
- Kingston and the Islands
- Kitchener
- Lambton—Kent—Middlesex
- Lanark—Carleton
- Leeds—Grenville
- Lincoln
- London East
- London—Middlesex
- London West
- Markham—Whitchurch—Stouffville (Markham prior to 1989)
- Mississauga East
- Mississauga South
- Mississauga West
- Nepean
- Niagara Falls
- Nickel Belt
- Nipissing
- Northumberland
- Oakville—Milton
- Ontario
- Oshawa
- Ottawa Centre
- Ottawa South
- Ottawa West
- Ottawa—Vanier
- Oxford
- Parkdale—High Park
- Parry Sound—Muskoka
- Perth—Wellington—Waterloo
- Peterborough
- Prince Edward—Hastings
- Renfrew—Nipissing—Pembroke (Renfrew prior to 1989)
- Rosedale
- Sarnia—Lambton
- Sault Ste. Marie
- Scarborough Centre
- Scarborough East
- Scarborough West
- Scarborough—Agincourt
- Scarborough—Rouge River
- Simcoe Centre
- Simcoe North
- St. Catharines
- St. Paul's
- Stormont—Dundas
- Sudbury
- Thunder Bay—Atikokan
- Thunder Bay—Nipigon
- Timiskaming (renamed Timiskaming—French River in 1993; no boundary change)
- Timmins—Chapleau
- Trinity—Spadina
- Victoria—Haliburton
- Waterloo
- Welland—St. Catharines—Thorold
- Wellington—Grey—Dufferin—Simcoe
- Willowdale
- Windsor West
- Windsor—St. Clair (Windsor—Lake St. Clair prior to 1989)
- York Centre
- York North
- York South—Weston
- York—Simcoe
- York West

== Manitoba – 14 seats ==
- Brandon—Souris
- Churchill
- Dauphin—Swan River
- Lisgar—Marquette
- Portage—Interlake
- Provencher
- Selkirk—Red River (Selkirk prior to 1990)
- Saint Boniface
- Winnipeg North Centre
- Winnipeg North
- Winnipeg South
- Winnipeg St. James
- Winnipeg South Centre
- Winnipeg—Transcona

== Saskatchewan – 14 seats ==
- Kindersley—Lloydminster
- Mackenzie
- Moose Jaw—Lake Centre
- Prince Albert—Churchill River
- Regina—Lumsden
- Regina—Qu'Appelle
- Regina—Wascana
- Saskatoon—Clark's Crossing
- Saskatoon—Dundurn
- Saskatoon—Humboldt
- Souris—Moose Mountain
- Swift Current—Maple Creek—Assiniboia
- The Battlefords—Meadow Lake
- Yorkton—Melville

== Alberta – 26 seats ==
- Athabasca
- Beaver River
- Calgary Centre
- Calgary North
- Calgary Northeast
- Calgary Southeast
- Calgary Southwest
- Calgary West
- Crowfoot
- Edmonton East
- Edmonton North
- Edmonton Northwest
- Edmonton Southeast
- Edmonton Southwest
- Edmonton—Strathcona
- Elk Island
- Lethbridge
- Macleod
- Medicine Hat
- Peace River
- Red Deer
- St. Albert
- Vegreville
- Wetaskiwin
- Wild Rose
- Yellowhead

== British Columbia – 32 seats ==
- Burnaby—Kingsway
- Capilano—Howe Sound
- Cariboo—Chilcotin
- Comox—Alberni
- Delta
- Esquimalt—Juan de Fuca
- Fraser Valley East
- Fraser Valley West
- Kamloops
- Kootenay East
- Kootenay West—Revelstoke
- Mission—Coquitlam
- Nanaimo—Cowichan
- New Westminster—Burnaby
- North Island—Powell River
- North Vancouver
- Okanagan Centre
- Okanagan—Shuswap
- Okanagan—Similkameen—Merritt
- Port Moody—Coquitlam
- Prince George—Bulkley Valley
- Prince George—Peace River
- Richmond
- Saanich—Gulf Islands
- Skeena
- Surrey North
- Surrey—White Rock—South Langley (Surrey—White Rock prior to 1990)
- Vancouver Centre
- Vancouver East
- Vancouver Quadra
- Vancouver South
- Victoria

== Northwest Territories – 2 seats ==
- Western Arctic
- Nunatsiaq

== Yukon – 1 seat ==
- Yukon

Preceded by Electoral districts 1976–1987	Historical federal electoral districts of Canada	Succeeded by Electoral districts 1996–2003
