= List of Canadian electoral districts (1914–1924) =

This is a list of electoral districts or ridings in Canada for the Canadian federal elections of 1917 and 1921.

Electoral districts are constituencies that elect members of Parliament in Canada's House of Commons.

== Nova Scotia – 16 seats ==
- Antigonish—Guysborough
- Cape Breton South and Richmond*
- Colchester
- Cumberland
- Digby and Annapolis
- Halifax*
- Hants
- Inverness
- Kings
- Lunenburg
- North Cape Breton and Victoria
- Pictou
- Shelburne and Queen's
- Yarmouth and Clare

== Prince Edward Island – 4 seats ==
- King's
- Prince
- Queen's*

When the new arrangement was devised in 1914, it gave PEI only three seats. After public complaints, a rule that a province could not have fewer MPs than Senators was introduced giving PEI back a fourth seat in 1915. The arrangement with only three PEI seats was never used in an election.

== New Brunswick – 11 seats ==
- Charlotte
- Gloucester
- Kent
- Northumberland
- Restigouche—Madawaska
- Royal
- St. John—Albert*
- Victoria—Carleton
- Westmorland
- York—Sunbury

== Quebec – 65 seats ==
- Argenteuil
- Bagot
- Beauce
- Beauharnois
- Bellechasse
- Berthier
- Bonaventure
- Brome
- Chambly—Verchères
- Champlain
- Charlevoix—Montmorency
- Châteauguay—Huntingdon
- Chicoutimi—Saguenay
- Compton
- Dorchester
- Drummond—Arthabaska
- Gaspé
- George-Étienne Cartier
- Hochelaga
- Hull
- Jacques Cartier
- Joliette
- Kamouraska
- L'Assomption—Montcalm
- L'Islet
- Labelle
- Laprairie—Napierville
- Laurier—Outremont
- Laval—Two Mountains
- Lévis
- Lotbinière
- Maisonneuve
- Maskinongé
- Matane
- Mégantic
- Missisquoi
- Montmagny
- Nicolet
- Pontiac
- Portneuf
- Quebec County
- Quebec East
- Quebec South
- Quebec West
- Richelieu
- Richmond—Wolfe
- Rimouski
- Shefford
- Town of Sherbrooke
- St. Ann
- St. Antoine
- St. Denis
- St. Hyacinthe—Rouville
- St. James
- St. Johns—Iberville
- St. Lawrence—St. George
- St. Mary
- Stanstead
- Témiscouata
- Terrebonne
- Three Rivers and St. Maurice
- Vaudreuil—Soulanges
- Westmount—St. Henri
- Wright
- Yamaska

== Ontario – 82 seats ==
- Algoma East
- Algoma West
- Brant
- Brantford
- Bruce North
- Bruce South
- Carleton
- Dufferin
- Dundas
- Durham
- Elgin East
- Elgin West
- Essex North
- Essex South
- Fort William and Rainy River
- Frontenac
- Glengarry and Stormont
- Grenville
- Grey North
- Grey Southeast
- Haldimand
- Halton
- Hamilton East
- Hamilton West
- Hastings East
- Hastings West
- Huron North
- Huron South
- Kent
- Kingston
- Lambton East
- Lambton West
- Lanark
- Leeds
- Lennox and Addington
- Lincoln
- London
- Middlesex East
- Middlesex West
- Muskoka
- Nipissing
- Norfolk
- Northumberland
- Ontario North
- Ontario South
- Ottawa (City of)*
- Oxford North
- Oxford South
- Parkdale
- Parry Sound
- Peel
- Perth North
- Perth South
- Peterborough East
- Peterborough West
- Port Arthur and Kenora
- Prescott
- Prince Edward
- Renfrew North
- Renfrew South
- Russell
- Simcoe East
- Simcoe North
- Simcoe South
- Timiskaming
- Toronto Centre
- Toronto East
- Toronto North
- Toronto South
- Toronto West
- Victoria
- Waterloo North
- Waterloo South
- Welland
- Wellington North
- Wellington South
- Wentworth
- York East
- York North
- York South
- York West

== Manitoba – 15 seats ==
- Brandon
- Dauphin
- Lisgar
- Macdonald
- Marquette
- Neepawa
- Nelson
- Portage la Prairie
- Provencher
- Selkirk
- Souris
- Springfield
- Winnipeg Centre
- Winnipeg North
- Winnipeg South

== Saskatchewan – 16 seats ==
- Assiniboia
- Battleford
- Humboldt
- Kindersley
- Last Mountain
- Mackenzie
- Maple Creek
- Moose Jaw
- North Battleford
- Prince Albert
- Qu'Appelle
- Regina
- Saltcoats
- Saskatoon
- Swift Current
- Weyburn

== Alberta – 12 seats ==
- Battle River
- Bow River
- Calgary West
- East Calgary
- Edmonton East
- Edmonton West
- Lethbridge
- Macleod
- Medicine Hat
- Red Deer
- Strathcona
- Victoria

== British Columbia – 13 seats ==
- Burrard
- Cariboo
- Comox—Alberni
- Kootenay East
- Kootenay West
- Nanaimo
- New Westminster
- Skeena
- Vancouver Centre
- Vancouver South
- Victoria City
- Westminster District (renamed Fraser Valley in 1919)
- Yale

== Yukon – 1 seat ==
- Yukon

*returned two members

Preceded by Electoral districts 1907–1914	Historical federal electoral districts of Canada	Succeeded by Electoral districts 1924–1933
