= Robert Duncan Wilmot Jr. =

Canadian politician

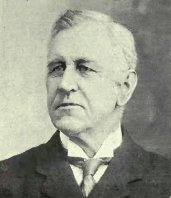

Member of the Canadian Parliament for Sunbury
- In office 1887–1896
- Preceded by: Charles Burpee
- Succeeded by: District was abolished in 1892

Member of the Canadian Parliament for Sunbury—Queen's
- In office 1900–1908
- Preceded by: Andrew George Blair
- Succeeded by: Hugh Havelock McLean

Personal details
- Born: July 17, 1837 Liverpool, England
- Died: January 7, 1920 (aged 82)
- Party: Conservative
- Spouse: Elizabeth W. Black
- Relations: Robert Duncan Wilmot, father
- Children: Agnes Wilmot; Allan Black Wilmot

Robert Duncan Wilmot Jr. (July 17, 1837 – January 7, 1920) was a Canadian farmer, businessman and politician.

== Biography ==
Born in Liverpool, England, where his father, Robert Duncan Wilmot, was working in the family shipbuilding business from 1835 to 1840, Wilmot was educated in Saint John, New Brunswick, and the Sunbury County Grammar School. In 1867, he married Elizabeth W. Black. He was a member of the Sunbury Municipal Council and Warden of the county. Wilmot also served as lieutenant colonel in the militia. He ran unsuccessfully for a seat in the provincial assembly in 1886. He was first elected to the House of Commons of Canada for the riding of Sunbury in the 1887 federal election. A Conservative, he was re-elected in 1891 but was defeated in the 1896 federal election and in an 1896 by-election. He was elected again in the 1900 election for the riding of Sunbury—Queen's and in 1904. He was defeated in 1908.

1887 Canadian federal election: Sunbury
Party	Candidate	Votes
Conservative	Robert Duncan Wilmot	588
Liberal	Charles Burpee	555
