= List of Canadian electoral districts (1996–2003) =

This is a list of the Canadian electoral districts used between 1997 and 2003. During this period, the House of Commons of Canada had 301 seats. This arrangement was used in the 1997 federal election, the 2000 federal election. The Ontario ridings were used in the 1999 and 2003 provincial elections.

== Newfoundland – 7 seats ==
- Bonavista—Trinity—Conception
- Burin—St. George's
- Gander—Grand-Falls
- Humber—St. Barbe—Baie Verte
- Labrador
- St. John's East
- St. John's West

== Prince Edward Island – 4 seats ==
- Cardigan
- Egmont
- Hillsborough
- Malpeque

== Nova Scotia – 11 seats ==
- Bras d'Or (renamed Bras d'Or—Cape Breton in 1998)
- Cumberland—Colchester
- Dartmouth
- Halifax
- Halifax West
- Kings—Hants
- Pictou—Antigonish—Guysborough
- Sackville—Eastern Shore (renamed Sackville—Musquodoboit Valley—Eastern Shore in 1999)
- South Shore
- Sydney—Victoria
- West Nova

== New Brunswick – 10 seats ==
- Acadie—Bathurst
- Beauséjour—Petitcodiac (Beauséjour prior to 1997)
- Charlotte (renamed New Brunswick Southwest in 1998)
- Fredericton
- Fundy—Royal
- Madawaska—Restigouche
- Miramichi
- Moncton (renamed Moncton—Riverview—Dieppe in 1998)
- Saint John
- Tobique—Mactaquac

== Quebec – 75 seats ==
- Abitibi—Baie-James—Nunavik (Abitibi prior to 1998)
- Ahuntsic
- Anjou—Rivière-des-Prairies
- Argenteuil—Papineau—Mirabel (Argenteuil—Papineau prior to 1999)
- Beauce
- Beauharnois—Salaberry
- Beauport—Montmorency—Côte-de-Beaupré—Île-d'Orléans (Beauport—Montmorency—Orléans prior to 1998)
- Bellechasse—Etchemins—Montmagny—L'Islet (Bellechasse—Montmagny—L'Islet prior to 1997)
- Berthier—Montcalm
- Bonaventure—Gaspé—Îles-de-la-Madeleine—Pabok (Gaspé—Bonaventure—Îles-de-la-Madeleine prior to 1997)
- Bourassa
- Brome—Missisquoi
- Brossard—La Prairie
- Chambly
- Champlain
- Charlesbourg—Jacques-Cartier (Charlesbourg prior to 2000)
- Charlevoix
- Châteauguay
- Chicoutimi—Le Fjord (Chicoutimi prior to 2000)
- Compton—Stanstead
- Drummond
- Frontenac—Mégantic
- Gatineau
- Hochelaga—Maisonneuve
- Hull—Aylmer
- Joliette
- Jonquière
- Kamouraska—Rivière-du-Loup—Temiscouata—Les Basques (Kamouraska—Rivière-du-Loup—Temiscouata prior to 1997)
- Lac-Saint-Louis
- Lac-Saint-Jean—Saguenay (Lac-Saint-Jean prior to 2000)
- LaSalle—Émard
- Laurentides
- Laurier—Sainte-Marie
- Laval Centre
- Laval East
- Laval West
- Lévis-et-Chutes-de-la-Chaudière (Lévis prior to 1998)
- Longueuil
- Lotbinière—L'Érable (Lotbinière prior to 2000)
- Louis-Hébert
- Manicouagan
- Matapédia—Matane
- Mercier
- Mount Royal
- Notre-Dame-de-Grâce—Lachine (Lachine—Notre-Dame-de-Grâce prior to 1997)
- Outremont
- Papineau—Saint-Denis
- Pierrefonds—Dollard
- Pontiac—Gatineau—Labelle
- Portneuf
- Québec
- Quebec East
- Repentigny
- Richelieu (renamed Bas-Richelieu—Nicolet—Bécancour in 1998)
- Richmond—Arthabaska
- Rimouski—Neigette-et-La-Mitis (Known as Rimouski prior to 1997 and Rimouski—Mitis from 1997 to 2000)
- Roberval
- Rosemont—Petite-Patrie (Rosemont prior to 2000)
- Saint-Bruno—Saint-Hubert (Saint-Hubert prior to 1997)
- Saint-Eustache—Sainte-Thérèse (renamed Rivière-des-Mille-Îles in 1998)
- Saint-Hyacinthe—Bagot
- Saint-Jean
- Saint-Lambert
- Saint-Laurent—Cartierville
- Saint-Léonard—Saint-Michel
- Saint-Maurice
- Shefford
- Sherbrooke
- Témiscamingue (Rouyn-Noranda—Témiscamingue prior to 1997)
- Terrebonne—Blainville
- Trois-Rivières
- Vaudreuil—Soulanges (Vaudreuil prior to 1997)
- Verchères—Les Patriotes (Verchères prior to 1998)
- Verdun—Saint-Henri (changed to Verdun—Saint-Henri—Saint-Paul—Pointe-Saint-Charles in 2000)
- Westmount—Ville-Marie

== Ontario – 103 seats ==
- Algoma—Manitoulin (Algoma prior to 1997)
- Ancaster—Dundas—Flamborough—Aldershot (Wentworth—Burlington prior to 2000)
- Barrie—Simcoe—Bradford (Barrie—Simcoe prior to 1997)
- Beaches—East York (Beaches—Woodbine prior to 1997)
- Bramalea—Gore—Malton—Springdale (Bramalea—Gore—Malton prior to 1998)
- Brampton Centre
- Brampton West—Mississauga
- Brant
- Bruce—Grey—Owen Sound (Bruce—Grey prior to 2000)
- Burlington
- Cambridge
- Chatham-Kent—Essex (Kent—Essex prior to 1998)
- Davenport
- Essex
- Don Valley East
- Don Valley West
- Dufferin—Peel—Wellington—Grey
- Durham
- Eglinton—Lawrence
- Elgin—Middlesex—London
- Erie—Lincoln
- Etobicoke Centre
- Etobicoke North
- Etobicoke—Lakeshore
- Glengarry—Prescott—Russell
- Guelph—Wellington
- Haldimand—Norfolk—Brant
- Haliburton—Victoria—Brock (Victoria—Haliburton prior to 1998)
- Halton
- Hamilton East
- Hamilton—Mountain
- Hamilton West
- Hastings—Frontenac—Lennox and Addington
- Huron—Bruce
- Kenora—Rainy River
- Kingston and the Islands
- Kitchener Centre
- Kitchener—Waterloo
- Lambton—Kent—Middlesex
- Lanark—Carleton
- Leeds—Grenville
- London—Fanshawe
- London North-Centre (London—Adelaide prior to 1997)
- London West
- Markham
- Mississauga Centre
- Mississauga East
- Mississauga South
- Mississauga West
- Nepean—Carleton
- Niagara Centre
- Niagara Falls
- Nickel Belt
- Nipissing
- Northumberland
- Oak Ridges
- Oakville
- Oshawa
- Ottawa Centre
- Ottawa—Orleans (Known as Gloucester—Carleton prior to 1997 and Carleton—Gloucester from 1997 to 2000)
- Ottawa South
- Ottawa—Vanier
- Ottawa West—Nepean
- Oxford
- Parkdale—High Park
- Parry Sound—Muskoka
- Perth—Middlesex
- Peterborough
- Pickering—Ajax—Uxbridge
- Prince Edward—Hastings
- Renfrew—Nipissing—Pembroke
- Sarnia—Lambton
- Sault Ste. Marie
- Scarborough—Agincourt
- Scarborough Centre
- Scarborough East
- Scarborough—Rouge River
- Scarborough Southwest
- Simcoe—Grey
- Simcoe North
- St. Catharines
- St. Paul's
- Stormont—Dundas—Charlottenburgh (Stormont—Dundas prior to 1999)
- Stoney Creek
- Sudbury
- Thornhill
- Thunder Bay—Atikokan
- Thunder Bay—Superior North (Thunder Bay—Nipigon prior to 1998)
- Timiskaming—Cochrane
- Timmins—James Bay
- Toronto Centre—Rosedale
- Toronto—Danforth (Broadview—Greenwood prior to 2000)
- Trinity—Spadina
- Vaughan—King—Aurora (Vaughan—Aurora prior to 1997)
- Waterloo—Wellington
- Whitby—Ajax
- Willowdale
- Windsor—St. Clair
- Windsor West
- York Centre
- York North
- York South—Weston
- York West

== Manitoba – 14 seats ==
- Brandon—Souris
- Charleswood—St. James—Assiniboia (Charleswood—Assiniboia prior to 1998)
- Churchill
- Dauphin—Swan River
- Portage—Lisgar
- Provencher
- Saint Boniface
- Selkirk—Interlake
- Winnipeg Centre (Winnipeg North Centre prior to 1997)
- Winnipeg North Centre (Winnipeg North prior to 1997)
- Winnipeg North—St. Paul (Winnipeg—St. Paul prior to 1997)
- Winnipeg South
- Winnipeg South Centre
- Winnipeg—Transcona

== Saskatchewan – 14 seats ==
- Battlefords—Lloydminster
- Blackstrap
- Churchill River
- Cypress Hills—Grasslands
- Palliser
- Prince Albert
- Regina—Lumsden—Lake Centre (Regina—Arm River prior to 1997)
- Qu'Appelle (renamed Regina—Qu'Appelle in 1998)
- Saskatoon—Humboldt
- Saskatoon—Rosetown—Biggar (Saskatoon—Rosetown prior to 1997)
- Saskatoon—Wanuskewin (Wanuskewin prior to 2000)
- Souris—Moose Mountain
- Wascana
- Yorkton—Melville

== Alberta – 26 seats ==
- Athabasca
- Calgary Centre
- Calgary East
- Calgary Northeast
- Calgary—Nose Hill
- Calgary Southeast
- Calgary Southwest
- Calgary West
- Crowfoot
- Edmonton Centre-East (Edmonton East prior to 2000)
- Edmonton North
- Edmonton Southeast
- Edmonton Southwest
- Edmonton—Strathcona
- Edmonton West
- Elk Island
- Lakeland
- Lethbridge
- Macleod
- Medicine Hat
- Peace River
- Red Deer
- St. Albert
- Wetaskiwin
- Wild Rose
- Yellowhead

== British Columbia – 34 seats ==
- Burnaby—Douglas
- Cariboo—Chilcotin
- Delta—South Richmond
- Dewdney—Alouette
- Esquimalt—Juan de Fuca
- Fraser Valley
- Kamloops, Thompson and Highland Valleys (Kamloops prior to 1998)
- Kelowna
- Kootenay—Columbia
- Langley—Abbotsford (Langley—Matsqui prior to 1997)
- Nanaimo—Alberni
- Nanaimo—Cowichan
- New Westminster—Coquitlam—Burnaby
- North Vancouver
- Okanagan—Coquihalla
- Okanagan—Shuswap (North Okanagan–Shuswap prior to 1997)
- Port Moody—Coquitlam (renamed Port Moody—Coquitlam—Port Coquitlam in 1998)
- Prince George—Bulkley Valley
- Prince George—Peace River
- Richmond
- Saanich—Gulf Islands
- Skeena
- South Surrey—White Rock—Langley
- Surrey Central
- Surrey North
- Vancouver Centre
- Vancouver East
- Vancouver Island North
- Vancouver Kingsway
- Vancouver Quadra
- Vancouver South—Burnaby
- Victoria
- West Vancouver—Sunshine Coast
- West Kootenay—Okanagan (renamed Kootenay—Boundary—Okanagan in 1998)

== Territories – 3 seats ==
- Nunavut
- Western Arctic
- Yukon

| Preceded by Electoral districts 1987–1996 | Historical federal electoral districts of Canada | Succeeded by Electoral districts 2003–2013 |
