= Charles Burpee =

Canadian politician (1817–1909)

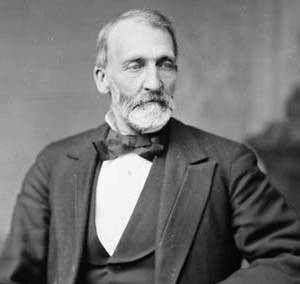
Charles Burpee Source: Library and Archives Canada

Charles Burpee (June 18, 1817 – November 29, 1909) was a New Brunswick farmer and political figure. He represented Sunbury in the House of Commons of Canada from 1867 to 1887 as a Liberal member. He was a member of the Senate of Canada representing New Brunswick in 1900.

He was born in Sheffield, Sunbury County, New Brunswick in 1817 and grew up there. His family had settled there around 1763 after leaving Massachusetts. Burpee served on the provincial board of agriculture from 1864 to 1865. He married Mary Perley and her sister Charlotte Hayward Perley (both died of childbirth), and Elizabeth Ann Morrow. Burpee was named to the Senate on February 1, 1900, and resigned on July 19 in the same year.

1867 Canadian federal election: Sunbury
Party	Candidate	Votes
Liberal	Charles Burpee	664
Unknown	William E. Perley	425
Source: Canadian Elections Database

1872 Canadian federal election: Sunbury
Party	Candidate	Votes
Liberal	Charles Burpee	acclaimed
Source: Canadian Elections Database

1874 Canadian federal election: Sunbury
Party	Candidate	Votes
Liberal	Charles Burpee	556
Unknown	William E. Perley	495
Source: lop.parl.ca

1878 Canadian federal election: Sunbury
Party	Candidate	Votes
Liberal	Charles Burpee	558
Conservative	William Dell Perley	517

1882 Canadian federal election: Sunbury
Party	Candidate	Votes
Liberal	Charles Burpee	618
Conservative	William Dell Perley	537

1887 Canadian federal election: Sunbury
Party	Candidate	Votes
Conservative	Robert Duncan Wilmot	588
Liberal	Charles Burpee	555
