= William E. Perley =

Canadian politician

William Edward Perley (March 1815 – 1899) was a farmer, lumberman and political figure in New Brunswick, Canada. He represented Sunbury County in the Legislative Assembly of New Brunswick from 1854 to 1870, from 1874 to 1882 and from 1890 to 1895 as a Liberal-Conservative.

He was born in Maugerville, New Brunswick, later moving to Blissville. In 1837, he married Sarah Hartt. Perley ran unsuccessfully for a seat in the federal parliament in 1867 and 1874. He was defeated in 1870. He served as a member of the province's Executive Council from 1862 to 1865, in 1874 and in 1878.

His son William Dell served in the Canadian House of Commons and Senate.

1867 Canadian federal election: Sunbury
Party	Candidate	Votes
Liberal	Charles Burpee	664
Unknown	William E. Perley	425
Source: Canadian Elections Database

1874 Canadian federal election: Sunbury
Party	Candidate	Votes
Liberal	Charles Burpee	556
Unknown	William E. Perley	495
Source: lop.parl.ca
