= Sunbury—Queen's =

Former federal electoral district in New Brunswick, Canada

New Brunswick electoral district

Defunct federal electoral district
- Legislature: House of Commons
- District created: 1892
- District abolished: 1914
- First contested: 1896
- Last contested: 1911

Demographics
- Census division(s): Queens, Sunbury

Sunbury—Queen's was a federal electoral district in New Brunswick, Canada, that was represented in the House of Commons of Canada from 1896 to 1917.

This riding was created in 1892 from the ridings of Queen's and Sunbury. It consisted of the counties of Sunbury and Queen's. It was abolished in 1914 when it was redistributed into Royal and York—Sunbury ridings.

In the 1911 Canadian federal election, Dow Grass of Deer Island was arrested for tampering with ballot boxes leading to the Sunbury—Queen's riding's invalidation of results.

== Members of Parliament ==
This riding elected the following members of Parliament:

Parliament	Years	Member	Party
Sunbury—Queen's; Riding created from Queen's and Sunbury
8th	1896–1896	George Gerald King	Liberal
8th	1896–1900	Andrew George Blair	Liberal
9th	1900–1904	Robert Duncan Wilmot Jr.	Conservative
10th	1904–1908	Robert Duncan Wilmot Jr.	Conservative
11th	1908–1911	Hugh Havelock McLean	Liberal
12th	1911–1917	Hugh Havelock McLean	Liberal
Riding dissolved into Royal and York—Sunbury

== Election results ==
1896 Canadian federal election
Party	Candidate	Votes
Liberal	KING, Geo. G.	1,778
Conservative	WILMOT, R.D.	1,599

By-election: Mr. King resigned, summoned to the Senate, 18 December 1896

By-election on 25 August 1896
Party	Candidate	Votes
Liberal	BLAIR, Hon. A.G.	2,310
Conservative	WILMOT, R.D.	1,686

1900 Canadian federal election
Party	Candidate	Votes
Conservative	WILMOT, Robert D.	2,143
Liberal	WHITE, Albert S.	1,868

1904 Canadian federal election
Party	Candidate	Votes
Conservative	WILMOT, Robert D.	1,917
Liberal	FRAY, Hugh Burns	1,799

1908 Canadian federal election
Party	Candidate	Votes
Liberal	MCLEAN, Hugh Havelock	1,951
Conservative	WILMOT, Robert Duncan	1,899

1911 Canadian federal election
Party	Candidate	Votes
Liberal	MCLEAN, Hugh Havelock	2,020
Conservative	SMITH, Luther Benjamin	2,010

== See also ==
- List of Canadian electoral districts
- Historical federal electoral districts of Canada
