= Sunbury (federal electoral district) =

Former federal electoral district in New Brunswick, Canada

New Brunswick electoral district

Defunct federal electoral district
- Legislature: House of Commons
- District created: 1867
- District abolished: 1892
- First contested: 1867
- Last contested: 1891

Demographics
- Census division(s): Sunbury

Sunbury was a federal electoral district in New Brunswick, Canada, that was represented in the House of Commons of Canada from 1867 to 1904.

It was created by the British North America Act 1867, and abolished in 1892 when it was merged into Sunbury—Queen's riding.

== Members of Parliament ==
This riding elected the following members of Parliament:

Parliament	Years	Member	Party
Sunbury
1st	1867–1872	Charles Burpee	Liberal
2nd	1872–1874	Charles Burpee	Liberal
3rd	1874–1878	Charles Burpee	Liberal
4th	1878–1882	Charles Burpee	Liberal
5th	1882–1887	Charles Burpee	Liberal
6th	1887–1891	Robert Duncan Wilmot Jr.	Conservative
7th	1891–1896	Robert Duncan Wilmot Jr.	Conservative
Riding dissolved into Sunbury—Queen's

== Election results ==
1867 Canadian federal election
Party	Candidate	Votes
Liberal	Charles Burpee	664
Unknown	William E. Perley	425
Source: Canadian Elections Database

1872 Canadian federal election
Party	Candidate	Votes
Liberal	Charles Burpee	acclaimed
Source: Canadian Elections Database

1874 Canadian federal election
Party	Candidate	Votes
Liberal	Charles Burpee	556
Unknown	William E. Perley	495
Source: lop.parl.ca

1878 Canadian federal election
Party	Candidate	Votes
Liberal	Charles Burpee	558
Conservative	William Dell Perley	517

1882 Canadian federal election
Party	Candidate	Votes
Liberal	Charles Burpee	618
Conservative	William Dell Perley	537

1887 Canadian federal election
Party	Candidate	Votes
Conservative	Robert Duncan Wilmot	588
Liberal	Charles Burpee	555

1891 Canadian federal election
Party	Candidate	Votes
Conservative	R.D. Wilmot	712
Liberal	Geo. E. Day	427

== See also ==
- List of Canadian electoral districts
- Historical federal electoral districts of Canada
