= High Park (federal electoral district) =

Federal electoral district in Metropolitan Toronto, Ontario, Canada

Ontario electoral district
- Coordinates: 43°39′N 79°28′W

Defunct federal electoral district
- Legislature: House of Commons
- District created: 1933
- District abolished: 1972
- First contested: 1935
- Last contested: 1968

Demographics
- Population (1941): 55,656
- Electors (1945): 41,785
- Census division(s): Toronto, Ontario
- Census subdivision(s): Toronto, Ontario

High Park was a federal electoral district in the west-end of the old City of Toronto, in Ontario, Canada. It was represented in the House of Commons of Canada from 1935 to 1972. It was created in 1933 and abolished in 1972, when it was redistributed into the newly created High Park—Humber Valley electoral district, which shared the same boundaries as High Park's 1966 incarnation.

== History of High Park ==
The federal riding was created in 1933 from the former riding of Toronto—High Park. It was initially defined to consist of ward seven of the city of Toronto — that was the former City of West Toronto Junction — and the part of ward six lying west of a line drawn from north to south along Indian Road, east along Howard Park Avenue, and south along Sunnyside Avenue to Lake Ontario. In 1952, it was redefined to include the Ellis Court Apartments.

In 1966, a major redistribution included the former village of Swansea and parts of Etobicoke for the first time, and not following just the old City of West Toronto Junction boundaries as it had previously. It was defined to consist of the part of Metropolitan Toronto bounded on the south by Lake Ontario, and on the east, north and west by a line drawn north along Parkside Drive, west along Bloor Street West, north on Pacific Avenue, east along Canadian Pacific Railway, north along Keele Street, west along Rogers Road, northwest along Weston Road, west along Black Creek, south along Jane Street, southwest along Dundas Street, southeast along Mimico Creek, east along The Queensway, and southeast along the Humber River to the shore of Lake Ontario.

The electoral district was abolished in 1972 when the name of the electoral district was changed to High Park—Humber Valley with the same borders as the 1966 redistribution.

== High Park–Humber Valley ==
High Park—Humber Valley
Ontario electoral district

Defunct federal electoral district
- Legislature: House of Commons
- District created: 1972
- District abolished: 1976
- First contested: 1972
- Last contested: 1974

Demographics
- Census division(s): Toronto
- Census subdivision(s): Toronto

High Park—Humber Valley was a federal electoral district in the west-end of the old Metropolitan Toronto, in Ontario, Canada. It was represented in the House of Commons from 1972 to 1979. It was created in 1972 from the High Park district, maintaining the same boundaries as the former district. It was abolished in 1976, but the next election did not occur until almost three-years later. Its only Member of Parliament was Otto Jelinek.

=== History ===
The federal riding was created in 1972 from the former High Park electoral district. It more or less contained the same boundaries as the former High Park riding. S.C. 1972, c.4 paragraph 25 of the Electoral Boundaries Readjustment Act substitute the word: "HIGH PARK", with the words: "HIGH PARK–HUMBER VALLEY" as the name of the district, with the same borders as the previously named one.

It was defined to consist of the part of Metropolitan Toronto bounded on the south by Lake Ontario, and on the east, north and west by a line drawn north along Parkside Drive, west along Bloor Street West, north on Pacific Avenue, east along Canadian Pacific Railway, north along Keele Street, west along Rogers Road, northwest along Weston Road, west along Black Creek, south along Jane Street, southwest along Dundas Street, southeast along Mimico Creek, east along The Queensway, and southeast along the Humber River to the shore of Lake Ontario.

The electoral district was abolished in 1976 when it was redistributed between Davenport, Etobicoke Centre, Parkdale—High Park and Etobicoke—Lakeshore ridings.

== Members of Parliament: High Park ==
Parliament	Years	Member	Party
Riding created from Toronto—High Park
18th	1935–1940	Alexander James Anderson	Conservative
19th	1940–1945	Alexander James Anderson	National Government
20th	1945–1949	William Alexander McMaster	Progressive Conservative
21st	1949–1953	Pat Cameron	Liberal
22nd	1953–1957	Pat Cameron	Liberal
23rd	1957–1958	John Kucherepa	Progressive Conservative
24th	1958–1962	John Kucherepa	Progressive Conservative
25th	1962–1963	Pat Cameron	Liberal
26th	1963–1965	Pat Cameron	Liberal
27th	1965–1968	Pat Cameron	Liberal
28th	1968–1972	Walter Deakon	Liberal
Riding dissolved into High Park—Humber Valley

== Members of Parliament: High Park–Humber Valley ==
Parliament	Years	Member	Party
Riding created from High Park
29th	1972–1974	Otto Jelinek	Progressive Conservative
30th	1974–1979	Otto Jelinek	Progressive Conservative
Riding dissolved into Parkdale—High Park, Davenport, Etobicoke Centre and Etobicoke—Lakeshore

== Federal election results: High Park ==
1935 Canadian federal election
Party	Candidate	Votes
Conservative	Alexander James Anderson	10,949
Liberal	James Chalmers McRuer	8,357
Reconstruction	Minerva Ellen Reid	4,396
Co-operative Commonwealth	Donat Marc LeBourdais	3,574

1940 Canadian federal election
Party	Candidate	Votes
National Government	Alexander James Anderson	12,266
Liberal	Pat Cameron	12,061
Co-operative Commonwealth	Carroll Langford Coburn	1,777

1945 Canadian federal election
Party	Candidate	Votes
Progressive Conservative	William Alexander McMaster	12,992
Liberal	Pat Cameron	11,379
Co-operative Commonwealth	William Horace Temple	5,612

1949 Canadian federal election
Party	Candidate	Votes
Liberal	Pat Cameron	12,216
Progressive Conservative	William Alexander McMaster	11,726
Co-operative Commonwealth	Clarence William Pethick	6,671

1953 Canadian federal election
Party	Candidate	Votes
Liberal	Pat Cameron	10,032
Progressive Conservative	William Cedric Davidson	8,526
Co-operative Commonwealth	Clarence William Pethick	3,847
Labor–Progressive	Victor George Hopwood	572

1957 Canadian federal election
Party	Candidate	Votes
Progressive Conservative	John W. Kucherepa	11,034
Liberal	Pat Cameron	8,767
Co-operative Commonwealth	Clarence William Pethick	3,657
Social Credit	Earl du Maresq	498

1958 Canadian federal election
Party	Candidate	Votes
Progressive Conservative	John W. Kucherepa	14,289
Liberal	Allan John Patrick Cameron	9,586
Co-operative Commonwealth	Clarence W. Pethick	3,256
Social Credit	Earl du Maresq	237

1962 Canadian federal election
Party	Candidate	Votes
Liberal	Pat Cameron	11,388
Progressive Conservative	John W. Kucherepa	9,089
New Democratic	Tom Wilson	4,903
Social Credit	Norman Pert	348

1963 Canadian federal election
Party	Candidate	Votes
Liberal	Pat Cameron	13,034
Progressive Conservative	James H. Stephens	7,045
New Democratic	Andrew W. Mays	4,425
Communist	William Malnychuk	420
Social Credit	Watson Middleton	203

1965 Canadian federal election
Party	Candidate	Votes
Liberal	Pat Cameron	11,171
Progressive Conservative	Bill Whiteacre	6,652
New Democratic	Anne Barrett	4,650

1968 Canadian federal election
Party	Candidate	Votes
Liberal	Walter Deakon	16,260
Progressive Conservative	Win McKay	10,743
New Democratic	Don Stevenson	8,131
Independent Liberal	Ralph B. Cowan	2,895
Independent	Henry Formosa	215

== Federal election results: High Park–Humber Valley ==
1972 Canadian federal election
Party	Candidate	Votes
Progressive Conservative	Otto Jelinek	18,329
Liberal	Walter Deakon	16,426
New Democratic	Edward J. Chmielewski	8,197
Not affiliated	John Weir	194
Not affiliated	Kenneth Kalturnyk	133

1974 Canadian federal election
Party	Candidate	Votes
Progressive Conservative	Otto Jelinek	17,389
Liberal	Murray McBride	17,134
New Democratic	Bill Reynolds	5,811
Communist	Elizabeth Hill	213
Independent	Michael A. Blake	148
Marxist–Leninist	Jim Nugent	73

== See also ==
- List of Canadian electoral districts
- Historical federal electoral districts of Canada
