= Essex East (electoral district) =

Former federal electoral district in Ontario, Canada

Ontario electoral district

Defunct federal electoral district
- Legislature: House of Commons
- District created: 1924
- District abolished: 1966
- First contested: 1925
- Last contested: 1965

Essex East was a federal electoral district represented in the House of Commons of Canada from 1925 to 1968. It was located in the province of Ontario. it was created in 1924 from parts of Essex North and Essex South ridings.

It initially consisted of the towns of Ford City and Walkerville and the villages of Riverside, Tecumseh and in the townships of Maidstone, Rochester and Tilbury (North and West) in the county of Essex, and the town of Tilbury in the county of Kent.

In 1933, it was redefined to exclude Ford City and the town of Tilbury, include the towns of East Windsor and townships of Sandwich East and Sandwich South, and the part of the city of Windsor south of Tecumseh Road;

In 1947, it was redefined to exclude the towns of East Windsor and Walkerville and the townships of Tilbury West, and Sandwich South, and the part of the city of Windsor east of the line dividing lots facing on Lincoln Road to the east and Gladstone Avenue to the west. In 1952, it was redefined to exclude the town of Tilbury and the town of Essex.

The electoral district was abolished in 1966 when it was redistributed between Essex, Windsor West and Windsor—Walkerville ridings.

== Members of Parliament ==
This riding elected the following members of the House of Commons of Canada:

Parliament	Years	Member	Party
Riding created from Essex North and Essex South
15th	1925–1926	Raymond Ducharme Morand	Conservative
16th	1926–1930	Edmond George Odette	Liberal
17th	1930–1935	Raymond Ducharme Morand	Conservative
18th	1935–1940	Paul Martin Sr.	Liberal
19th	1940–1945	Paul Martin Sr.	Liberal
20th	1945–1949	Paul Martin Sr.	Liberal
21st	1949–1953	Paul Martin Sr.	Liberal
22nd	1953–1957	Paul Martin Sr.	Liberal
23rd	1957–1958	Paul Martin Sr.	Liberal
24th	1958–1962	Paul Martin Sr.	Liberal
25th	1962–1963	Paul Martin Sr.	Liberal
26th	1963–1965	Paul Martin Sr.	Liberal
27th	1965–1968	Paul Martin Sr.	Liberal
Riding dissolved into Essex, Windsor West and Windsor—Walkerville

== Election results ==
1925 Canadian federal election
Party	Candidate	Votes	%	±%
Conservative	Raymond Ducharme Morand	6,052	50.83	
Liberal	Edmond George Odette	5,855	49.17	
Total valid votes		11,907	100.00	

1926 Canadian federal election
Party	Candidate	Votes	%	±%
Liberal	Edmond George Odette	7,555	52.91	+2.08
Conservative	Raymond Ducharme Morand	6,724	47.09	-2.08
Total valid votes		14,279	100.00	

1930 Canadian federal election
Party	Candidate	Votes	%	±%
Conservative	Raymond Ducharme Morand	9,243	56.44	+3.53
Liberal	Edmond George Odette	7,133	43.56	-3.53
Total valid votes		16,376	100.00	

1935 Canadian federal election
Party	Candidate	Votes	%	±%
Liberal	Paul Martin Sr.	7,562	39.25	-4.31
Conservative	Raymond Ducharme Morand	6,493	33.71	-22.73
Co-operative Commonwealth	Joseph Ben Levert	4,106	21.32	
Reconstruction	J. Gabriel McPharlin	1,102	5.72	
Total valid votes		19,263	100.00	

1940 Canadian federal election
Party	Candidate	Votes	%	±%
Liberal	Paul Martin Sr.	9,811	46.39	+7.14
National Government	Raymond Ducharme Morand	8,060	38.11	+4.40
Co-operative Commonwealth	Joseph Ben Levert	2,879	13.62	-7.70
Labour	Roy Robert Hicks	398	1.88	
Total valid votes		21,148	100.00	

1945 Canadian federal election
Party	Candidate	Votes	%	±%
Liberal	Paul Martin Sr.	16,165	56.21	+9.82
Progressive Conservative	James E. Byrne	8,244	28.67	-9.44
Co-operative Commonwealth	William C. MacDonald	4,349	15.12	+1.50
Total valid votes		28,758	100.00	

1949 Canadian federal election
Party	Candidate	Votes	%	±%
Liberal	Paul Martin Sr.	16,709	52.89	-3.32
Progressive Conservative	James Russell Turnbull	8,204	25.97	-2.70
Co-operative Commonwealth	William Riggs	5,213	16.50	+1.38
Labor–Progressive	Cyril Prince	1,464	4.64	
Total valid votes		31,590	100.00	

1953 Canadian federal election
Party	Candidate	Votes	%	±%
Liberal	Paul Martin Sr.	19,946	67.16	+14.27
Progressive Conservative	Aloysius Kennedy	5,530	18.62	-7.35
Co-operative Commonwealth	Kenneth Edwin Owen	3,013	10.14	-6.36
Labor–Progressive	Michael J. Kennedy	1,212	4.08	-0.56
Total valid votes		29,701	100.00	

1957 Canadian federal election
Party	Candidate	Votes	%	±%
Liberal	Paul Martin Sr.	22,023	57.15	-10.01
Progressive Conservative	Roy R. Hicks	10,593	27.49	+8.87
Co-operative Commonwealth	Jack Meteer	5,917	15.36	+5.22
Total valid votes		38,533	100.00	

1958 Canadian federal election
Party	Candidate	Votes	%	±%
Liberal	Paul Martin Sr.	18,074	41.98	-15.17
Progressive Conservative	Roy R. Hicks	16,451	38.21	+10.72
Co-operative Commonwealth	Fred A. Burr	8,530	19.81	+4.45
Total valid votes		43,055	100.00	

1962 Canadian federal election
Party	Candidate	Votes	%	±%
Liberal	Paul Martin Sr.	24,969	58.69	+16.71
New Democratic	George Drury	8,888	20.89	+1.08
Progressive Conservative	Roland Lionel Demers	8,210	19.30	-18.91
Social Credit	T. R. Cory	476	1.12	
Total valid votes		42,543	100.00	

1963 Canadian federal election
Party	Candidate	Votes	%	±%
Liberal	Paul Martin Sr.	25,727	59.82	+1.13
Progressive Conservative	David Gourlie	8,894	20.68	+1.38
New Democratic	Hugh McConville	7,648	17.78	-3.11
Social Credit	Frank Gignac	740	1.72	+0.60
Total valid votes		43,009	100.00	

1965 Canadian federal election
Party	Candidate	Votes	%	±%
Liberal	Paul Martin Sr.	26,094	63.78	+3.96
Progressive Conservative	David Gourlie	8,142	19.90	-0.78
New Democratic	Hugh McConville	6,133	14.99	-2.79
Communist	Bruce A. H. Magnuson	543	1.33	
Total valid votes		40,912	100.00	

== See also ==
- List of Canadian electoral districts
- Historical federal electoral districts of Canada
