= Historical federal electoral districts of Canada =

This is a list of past arrangements of Canada's electoral districts. Each district sends one member to the House of Commons of Canada.

This article contains a list of all the lists of the federal electoral districts that were in used at various time since confederation, and a summary table of provincial seat allocations over the history of Canada.

The allocations and adjustments of electoral districts in Canada are based on the principle of representation by population. Federal electoral districts are re-adjusted every ten years based on the decennialcensus and proscribed by various constitutional seat guarantees for provinces with declining share of the national population. Information on the process and the various rules are consolidated in Electoral district (Canada).

== Seat allocations to provinces and territories ==
Initial Election	1867	1872	1874	1882	1887	1896	1904	1908	1917	1925	1935	1949	1953	1968	1979	1988	1997	2004	2015	2025
Newfoundland												7	7	7	7	7	7	7	7	7
Prince Edward Island			6	6	6	5	4	4	4	4	4	4	4	4	4	4	4	4	4	4
Nova Scotia	19	21	21	21	21	20	18	18	16	14	12	13	12	11	11	11	11	11	11	11
New Brunswick	15	16	16	16	16	14	13	13	11	11	10	10	10	10	10	10	10	10	10	10
Quebec	65	65	65	65	65	65	65	65	65	65	65	73	75	74	75	75	75	75	78	78
Ontario	82	88	88	92	92	92	86	86	82	82	82	83	85	88	95	99	103	106	121	122
Manitoba		4	4	5	5	7	10	10	15	17	17	16	14	13	14	14	14	14	14	14
Saskatchewan								10	16	21	21	20	17	13	14	14	14	14	14	14
Alberta								7	12	16	17	17	17	19	21	26	26	28	34	37
British Columbia		6	6	6	6	6	7	7	13	14	16	18	22	23	28	32	34	36	42	43
Territories					4	4	11	1	1	1	1	1	2	2	3	3	3	3	3	3
Total	181	200	206	211	215	213	214	221	235	245	245	262	265	264	282	295	301	308	338	343
Initial Election	1867	1872	1874	1882	1887	1896	1904	1908	1917	1925	1935	1949	1953	1968	1979	1988	1997	2004	2015	2025
Elections Held	1	1	2	1	2	2	1	2	2	3	3	1	6	3	3	2	2	4	3	1
Base Census	-	1871		1881		1891	1901		1911	1921	1931	1941	1951	1961	1971	1981	1991	2001	2011	2021
Legislative Source	BNA	Representation Acts												Representation Orders						
Legislative Source	1867	1872		1882		1892	1903		1914	1924	1933	1947	1952	1966	1976	1987	1996	2003	2013	2023

== List ==
- List of Canadian electoral districts (1867–1871) — 181 seats
- List of Canadian electoral districts (1872–1873) — 200 seats
- List of Canadian electoral districts (1873–1882) — 206 seats
- List of Canadian electoral districts (1882–1886) — 211 seats
- List of Canadian electoral districts (1886–1892) — 215 seats
- List of Canadian electoral districts (1892–1903) — 213 seats
- List of Canadian electoral districts (1903–1907) — 214 seats
- List of Canadian electoral districts (1907–1914) — 221 seats
- List of Canadian electoral districts (1914–1924) — 235 seats
- List of Canadian electoral districts (1924–1933) — 245 seats
- List of Canadian electoral districts (1933–1947) — 245 seats
- List of Canadian electoral districts (1947–1952) — 262 seats
- List of Canadian electoral districts (1952–1966) — 265 seats
- List of Canadian electoral districts (1966–1976) — 264 seats
- List of Canadian electoral districts (1976–1987) — 282 seats
- List of Canadian electoral districts (1987–1996) — 295 seats
- List of Canadian electoral districts (1996–2003) — 301 seats
- List of Canadian electoral districts (2003–2013) — 308 seats
- List of Canadian electoral districts (2013–2023) — 338 seats
- List of Canadian electoral districts 2023 – present — 343 seats

== See also ==
- List of Canadian federal parliaments
- List of Canadian federal general elections
