= 8th Canadian Parliament =

1896–1900 national legislative term

- Majority parliament
- Aug. 19, 1896 – Jul. 18, 1900

Parliament leaders
- Prime minister: Rt. Hon. Sir Wilfrid Laurier; Jul. 11, 1896 – Oct. 6, 1911
- Cabinet: 8th Canadian Ministry
- Leader of the Opposition: Charles Tupper; 11 July 1896 – 5 February 1901

Party caucuses
- Government: Liberal Party
- Opposition: Conservative Party & Liberal-Conservative
- Crossbench: Patrons of Industry

House of Commons
- Seating arrangements of the House of Commons
- Speaker of the Commons: James David Edgar; August 19, 1896 – July 31, 1899
- Thomas Bain; August 1, 1899 – February 5, 1901

Senate
- Speaker of the Senate: Charles Alphonse Pantaléon Pelletier; July 13, 1896 – January 28, 1901
- Government Senate leader: Oliver Mowat; August 19, 1896 – November 17, 1897
- David Mills; November 17, 1897 – February 7, 1902
- Opposition Senate leader: Mackenzie Bowell; April 27, 1896 – March 1, 1906

Sovereign
- Monarch: Victoria; 1 July 1867 – 22 Jan. 1901
- Governor general: The Earl of Aberdeen; 18 Sep. 1893 – 12 Nov. 1898
- The Earl of Minto; 12 Nov. 1898 – 10 Dec. 1904

Sessions
- 1st session August 19, 1896 – October 5, 1896
- 2nd session March 25, 1897 – June 29, 1897
- 3rd session February 3, 1898 – June 13, 1898
- 4th session March 16, 1899 – August 11, 1899
- 5th session February 1, 1900 – July 18, 1900
← 7th	→ 9th

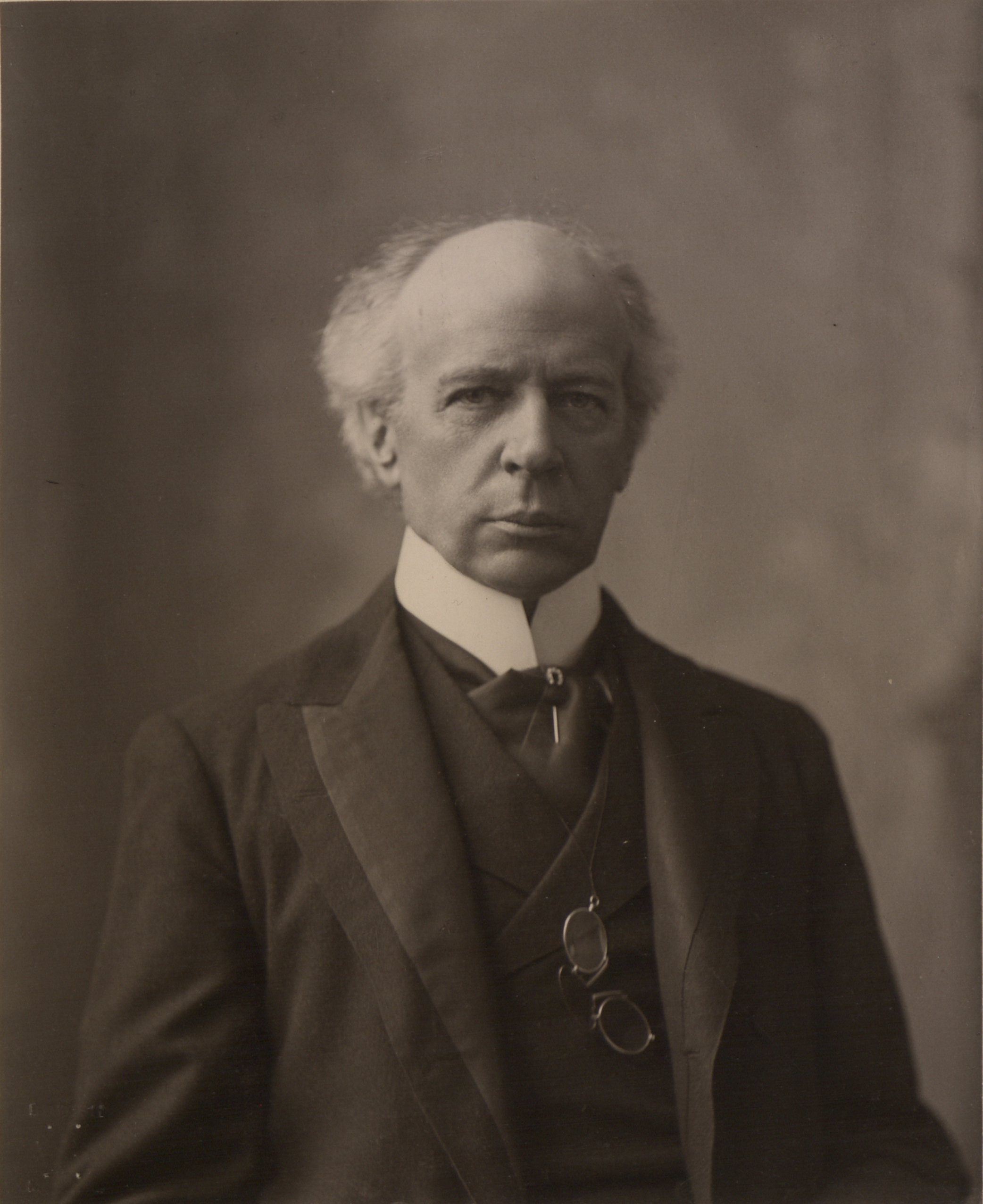
Sir Wilfrid Laurier was Prime Minister during the 8th Canadian Parliament.

The 8th Canadian Parliament was in session from August 19, 1896, until October 9, 1900 (4 years and 51 days). The membership was set by the 1896 federal election on June 23, 1896. It was dissolved prior to the 1900 election.

It was controlled by a Liberal Party majority under Prime Minister Sir Wilfrid Laurier and the 8th Canadian Ministry. The Official Opposition was the Conservative/Liberal-Conservative, led by Charles Tupper.

The Speaker was first James David Edgar, and later Thomas Bain. See also List of Canadian electoral districts 1892-1903 for a list of the ridings in this parliament.

There were five sessions of the 8th Parliament:

Session	Start	End
1st	August 19, 1896	October 5, 1896
2nd	March 25, 1897	June 29, 1897
3rd	February 3, 1898	June 13, 1898
4th	March 16, 1899	August 11, 1899
5th	February 1, 1900	July 18, 1900

== List of members ==
Following is a full list of members of the eighth Parliament listed first by province, then by electoral district.

Key:

- Party leaders are italicized.
- Cabinet ministers are in **boldface**.
- The Prime Minister is **both**.
- The Speaker is indicated by "(†)".

Electoral districts denoted by an asterisk (*) indicates that district was represented by two members.

=== British Columbia ===
Electoral district	Name	Party	First elected/previously elected	No. of terms
Burrard	George Ritchie Maxwell	Liberal	1896	1st term
New Westminster	Aulay MacAulay Morrison	Liberal	1896	1st term
Vancouver	William Wallace Burns McInnes	Liberal	1896	1st term
Victoria*	Edward Gawler Prior	Conservative	1888	3rd term
Victoria*	Thomas Earle	Conservative	1889	3rd term
Yale—Cariboo	Hewitt Bostock	Liberal	1896	1st term

=== Manitoba ===
Electoral district	Name	Party	First elected/previously elected	No. of terms
Brandon	Dalton McCarthy (left seat to keep Simcoe North, Ontario, riding)	Independent	1876	6th term
Brandon	**Clifford Sifton** (by-election of 1896-11-27)	Liberal	1896	1st term
Lisgar	Robert Lorne Richardson	Liberal	1896	1st term
Macdonald	Nathaniel Boyd	Conservative	1892	2nd term
Macdonald	John Gunion Rutherford (by-election of 1897-04-27)	Liberal	1897	1st term
Marquette	William James Roche	Conservative	1896	1st term
Provencher	Alphonse Alfred Clément Larivière	Conservative	1889	3rd term
Selkirk	John Alexander MacDonell	Liberal	1896	1st term
Winnipeg	Hugh John Macdonald (until election voided 29 March 1897)	Conservative	1891	2nd term
Winnipeg	Richard Willis Jameson (by-election of 1897-04-27)	Liberal	1897	1st term
Winnipeg	Arthur Puttee (by-election of 1900-01-25)	Labour	1900	1st term

=== New Brunswick ===
Electoral district	Name	Party	First elected/previously elected	No. of terms
Albert	William James Lewis	Independent	1896	1st term
Carleton	Frederick Harding Hale	Liberal-Conservative	1887, 1896	2nd term*
Charlotte	Gilbert White Ganong	Liberal-Conservative	1896	1st term
City and County of St. John	Joseph John Tucker	Liberal	1896	1st term
City of St. John	John Valentine Ellis	Liberal	1887, 1896	2nd term*
Gloucester	Théotime Blanchard	Conservative	1894	2nd term*
Kent	George Valentine McInerney	Conservative	1892	2nd term
King's	James Domville	Liberal	1872, (Note: First elected as Conservative) 1896	4th term*
Northumberland	James Robinson	Conservative	1896	2nd term
Restigouche	John McAlister	Liberal-Conservative	1891	2nd term
Sunbury—Queen's	George Gerald King (until 18 December 1896 Senate appointment)	Liberal	1878, 1891	5th term*
Sunbury—Queen's	**Andrew George Blair** (by-election of 1896-08-25)	Liberal	1896	1st term
Victoria	John Costigan	Liberal-Conservative	1867	8th term
Westmorland	Henry Absalom Powell	Liberal-Conservative	1895	2nd term
York	George Eulas Foster	Conservative	1882	4th term

=== Northwest Territories ===
Electoral district	Name	Party	First elected/previously elected	No. of terms
Alberta (Provisional District)	Frank Oliver	Liberal	1896	1st term
Assiniboia East	James Moffat Douglas	Liberal	1896	1st term
Assiniboia West	Nicholas Flood Davin	Liberal-Conservative	1887	3rd term
Saskatchewan (Provisional District)	**Wilfrid Laurier** (until 11 July 1896 appointment as Prime Minister)	Liberal	1874	6th term
Saskatchewan (Provisional District)	Thomas Osborne Davis (by-election of 1896-12-19)	Liberal	1896	1st term

=== Nova Scotia ===
Electoral district	Name	Party	First elected/previously elected	No. of terms
Annapolis	John Burpee Mills	Conservative	1887	3rd term
Antigonish	Colin Francis McIsaac	Liberal	1895	2nd term
Cape Breton*	Hector Francis McDougall	Liberal-Conservative	1884	3rd term
Cape Breton*	Charles Tupper	Conservative	1867, 1887, 1896	8th term*
Colchester	Wilbert David Dimock (until election voided)	Conservative	1896	1st term
Colchester	Firman McClure (by-election of 1897-04-20)	Liberal	1897	1st term
Cumberland	Hance James Logan	Liberal	1896	1st term
Digby	Albert James Smith Copp	Liberal	1896	1st term
Guysborough	Duncan Cameron Fraser	Liberal	1891	2nd term
Halifax*	Robert Laird Borden	Conservative	1896	1st term
Halifax*	Benjamin Russell	Liberal	1896	1st term
Hants	Allen Haley	Liberal	1896	1st term
Inverness	Angus MacLennan	Liberal	1896	1st term
Kings	**Frederick William Borden** (until 11 July 1896 ministerial appointment)	Liberal	1874, 1887	5th term*
Kings	**Frederick William Borden** (by-election of 1896-07-30)	Liberal	1874, 1887	5th term*
Lunenburg	Charles Edwin Kaulbach	Conservative	1882, 1883, 1891	4th term*
Pictou*	Adam Carr Bell	Conservative	1896	1st term
Pictou*	Charles Hibbert Tupper	Conservative	1882	4th term
Richmond	Joseph Alexander Gillies	Conservative	1891	2nd term
Shelburne and Queen's	Francis Gordon Forbes (until 18 July 1896 customs appointment)	Liberal	1891	2nd term
Shelburne and Queen's	**William Stevens Fielding** (by-election of 1896-08-05)	Liberal	1896	1st term
Victoria	John Lemuel Bethune	Conservative	1896	1st term
Yarmouth	Thomas Barnard Flint	Liberal	1891	2nd term

=== Ontario ===
Electoral district	Name	Party	First elected/previously elected	No. of terms
Addington	John William Bell	Conservative	1882, 1896	3rd term*
Algoma	Albert Dyment	Liberal	1896	1st term
Bothwell	James Clancy	Conservative	1896	1st term
Brant South	Robert Henry	Conservative	1896	1st term
Brant South	Charles Bernhard Heyd (by-election of 1897-02-04)	Liberal	1897	1st term
Brockville	John Fisher Wood	Liberal-Conservative	1882	4th term
Brockville	William Henry Comstock (by-election of 1899-04-20)	Liberal	1899	1st term
Bruce East	Henry Cargill	Conservative	1892	2nd term
Bruce North	Alexander McNeill	Liberal-Conservative	1882	4th term
Bruce West	John Tolmie	Liberal	1896	1st term
Cardwell	William Stubbs	Independent Conservative	1895	2nd term
Carleton	William Thomas Hodgins	Conservative	1891	2nd term
Cornwall and Stormont	Darby Bergin	Liberal-Conservative	1872, 1878	6th term*
Cornwall and Stormont	John Goodall Snetsinger (by-election of 1896-12-19)	Liberal	1896	1st term
Dundas	Andrew Broder	Conservative	1896	1st term
Durham East	Thomas Dixon Craig	Independent Conservative	1891	2nd term
Durham West	Robert Beith	Liberal	1891	2nd term
Elgin East	Andrew B. Ingram	Liberal-Conservative	1891	2nd term
Elgin West	George Elliott Casey	Liberal	1878	5th term
Essex North	William McGregor	Liberal	1891	2nd term
Essex South	Mahlon K. Cowan	Liberal	1896	1st term
Frontenac	David Dickson Rogers	Patrons of Industry	1896	1st term
Glengarry	Roderick R. McLennan	Conservative	1891	2nd term
Grenville South	John Dowsley Reid	Conservative	1891	2nd term
Grey East	Thomas Simpson Sproule	Conservative	1878	5th term
Grey North	John Clark	Liberal	1896	1st term
Grey North	**William Paterson** (by-election of 1896-08-25)	Liberal	1896	1st term
Grey South	George Landerkin	Liberal	1872, 1882	6th term*
Haldimand and Monck	Walter Humphries Montague	Conservative	1887, 1890	4th term*
Halton	David Henderson	Conservative	1887, 1888	4th term*
Hamilton*	Andrew Trew Wood	Liberal	1874, 1896	2nd term*
Hamilton*	Thomas Henry Macpherson	Liberal	1896	1st term
Hastings East	Jeremiah M. Hurley	Liberal	1896	1st term
Hastings North	Alexander Augustus Williamson Carscallen	Conservative	1892	2nd term
Hastings West	Henry Corby	Conservative	1888	3rd term
Huron East	Peter Macdonald	Liberal	1887	3rd term
Huron South	John McMillan	Liberal	1882, 1887	4th term*
Huron West	Malcolm Colin Cameron (until 30 May 1898 appointment as North West Territories Lieutenant-Governor)	Liberal	1867, 1891, 1896	8th term*
Huron West	Robert Holmes (by-election of 1899-02-21)	Liberal	1899	1st term
Kent	Archibald Campbell	Liberal	1887	3rd term
Kingston	Byron Moffatt Britton	Liberal	1896	1st term
Lambton East	John Fraser	Liberal	1896	1st term
Lambton West	James Frederick Lister (until 21 June 1898 judicial appointment)	Liberal	1882	4th term
Lambton West	Thomas George Johnston (by-election of 1898-12-14)	Liberal	1898	1st term
Lanark North	Bennett Rosamond	Conservative	1891	2nd term
Lanark South	John Graham Haggart	Conservative	1872	7th term
Leeds North and Grenville North	Francis Theodore Frost	Liberal	1896	1st term
Leeds South	George Taylor	Conservative	1882	4th term
Lennox	Uriah Wilson	Conservative	1892	2nd term
Lincoln and Niagara	William Gibson	Liberal	1891	2nd term
London	Thomas Beattie	Conservative	1896	1st term
Middlesex East	James Gilmour	Conservative	1896	1st term
Middlesex North	Valentine Ratz	Liberal	1896	1st term
Middlesex South	Malcolm McGugan	Liberal	1896	1st term
Middlesex West	William Samuel Calvert	Liberal	1896	1st term
Muskoka and Parry Sound	George McCormick	Liberal-Conservative	1896	1st term
Nipissing	James Bell Klock	Conservative	1896	1st term
Norfolk North	John Charlton	Liberal	1872	7th term
Norfolk South	David Tisdale	Conservative	1887	3rd term
Northumberland East	Edward Cochrane	Conservative	1887	3rd term
Northumberland West	George Guillet	Conservative	1891	2nd term
Ontario North	John Alexander McGillivray	Liberal-Conservative	1895	2nd term
Ontario North	Duncan Graham (by-election of 1897-02-04)	Independent Liberal	1897	1st term
Ontario South	Leonard Burnett	Liberal	1896	1st term
Ontario West	James David Edgar (died 31 July 1899) (†)	Liberal	1884	4th term
Ontario West	Isaac James Gould (by-election of 1900-01-18)	Liberal	1900	1st term
Ottawa (City of)*	Napoléon Antoine Belcourt	Liberal	1896	1st term
Ottawa (City of)*	William H. Hutchison	Liberal	1896	1st term
Oxford North	**James Sutherland**	Liberal	1880	4th term
Oxford South	**Richard John Cartwright** (until ministerial appointment)	Liberal	1867	8th term
Oxford South	**Richard John Cartwright** (by-election of 1896-07-30)	Liberal	1867	8th term
Peel	Joseph Featherston	Liberal	1891	2nd term
Perth North	Alexander Ferguson Maclaren	Conservative	1896	1st term
Perth South	Dilman Kinsey Erb	Liberal	1896	1st term
Peterborough East	John Lang	Independent Liberal	1896	1st term
Peterborough West	James Kendry	Conservative	1887	3rd term
Prescott	Isidore Proulx	Liberal	1891	2nd term
Prince Edward	William Varney Pettet	Patrons of Industry	1896	1st term
Renfrew North	Thomas Mackie	Liberal	1896	1st term
Renfrew South	John Ferguson	Independent Conservative	1887	3rd term
Russell	William Cameron Edwards	Liberal	1887	3rd term
Simcoe East	William Humphrey Bennett	Conservative	1892	2nd term
Simcoe East	William Humphrey Bennett (by-election of 1897-02-04)	Conservative	1892	2nd term
Simcoe North	Dalton McCarthy (died 11 May 1898)	Independent	1887	3rd term
Simcoe North	Leighton Goldie McCarthy (by-election of 1898-12-14)	Independent	1898	1st term
Simcoe South	Richard Tyrwhitt	Conservative	1882	4th term
Toronto Centre	William Lount	Liberal	1896	1st term
Toronto Centre	George Hope Bertram (by-election of 1897-11-30)	Liberal	1897	1st term
Toronto East	John Ross Robertson	Independent Conservative	1896	1st term
Victoria North	Sam Hughes	Liberal-Conservative	1892	2nd term
Victoria South	George McHugh	Liberal	1896	1st term
Waterloo North	Joseph Emm Seagram	Conservative	1896	1st term
Waterloo South	James Livingston	Liberal	1882	4th term
Welland	William McCleary	Conservative	1896	1st term
Wellington Centre	Andrew Semple	Liberal	1887	3rd term
Wellington North	James McMullen	Liberal	1882	4th term
Wellington South	Christian Kloepfer	Conservative	1896	1st term
Wentworth North and Brant	James Somerville	Liberal	1882	4th term
Wentworth South	Thomas Bain (†)	Liberal	1872	7th term
West Toronto*	Edmund Boyd Osler	Conservative	1896	1st term
West Toronto*	Edward Frederick Clarke	Conservative	1896	1st term
York East	William Findlay Maclean	Conservative	1892	2nd term
York North	**William Mulock** (until Postmaster General appointment)	Liberal	1882	4th term
York North	**William Mulock** (by-election of 1896-07-30)	Liberal	1882	4th term
York West	Nathaniel Clarke Wallace	Conservative	1878	5th term

=== Prince Edward Island ===
Electoral district	Name	Party	First elected/previously elected	No. of terms
East Prince	John Yeo (until 19 November 1898 Senate appointment)	Liberal	1891	2nd term
East Prince	John Howatt Bell (by-election of 1898-12-14)	Liberal	1898	1st term
East Queen's	Alexander Martin	Conservative	1896	1st term
King's	Augustine Colin Macdonald	Conservative	1873, 1878, 1883, 1891	5th term*
West Prince	Edward Hackett (until election voided 24 March 1897)	Liberal-Conservative	1878, 1896	3rd term*
West Prince	Stanislaus Francis Perry (by-election of 1897-04-27, died 24 February 1898)	Liberal	1874, 1887, 1897	4th term*
West Prince	Bernard Donald McLellan (by-election of 1898-04-13)	Liberal	1896	1st term
West Queen's	**Louis Henry Davies** (until 11 July 1896 ministerial appointment)	Liberal	1882	4th term
West Queen's	**Louis Henry Davies** (by-election of 1896-07-30)	Liberal	1882	4th term

=== Quebec ===
Electoral district	Name	Party	First elected/previously elected	No. of terms
Argenteuil	Thomas Christie	Liberal	1875, 1891	4th term*
Bagot	Flavien Dupont (died in office)	Conservative	1882	4th term
Bagot	Joseph Edmond Marcile (by-election of 1898-12-14)	Liberal	1898	1st term
Beauce	Joseph Godbout	Liberal	1887	3rd term
Beauharnois	Joseph Gédéon Horace Bergeron	Conservative	1882	4th term
Bellechasse	Onésiphore Ernest Talbot	Liberal	1896	1st term
Berthier	Cléophas Beausoleil (until 1 December 1899 postmaster appointment)	Liberal	1882	4th term
Berthier	Joseph Éloi Archambault (by-election of 1900-01-18)	Liberal	1900	1st term
Bonaventure	William LeBoutillier Fauvel (died 8 February 1897)	Liberal	1891	2nd term
Bonaventure	Jean-François Guité (by-election of 1897-03-17)	Liberal	1897	1st term
Brome	**Sydney Arthur Fisher** (until 11 July 1896 ministerial appointment)	Liberal	1896	1st term
Brome	**Sydney Arthur Fisher** (by-election of 1896-07-30)	Liberal	1896	1st term
Chambly—Verchères	**Christophe Alphonse Geoffrion** (died 18 July 1899)	Liberal	1895	2nd term
Chambly—Verchères	Victor Geoffrion (by-election of 1900-01-18)	Liberal	1900	1st term
Champlain	François Arthur Marcotte (until election voided 12 January 1897)	Conservative	1896	1st term
Champlain	François Arthur Marcotte (by-election of 1897-04-07)	Conservative	1896	1st term
Charlevoix	Louis Charles Alphonse Angers	Liberal	1896	2nd term
Châteauguay	James Pollock Brown	Liberal	1891	2nd term
Chicoutimi—Saguenay	Paul Vilmond Savard	Liberal	1891	2nd term
Compton	Rufus Henry Pope	Conservative	1889	3rd term
Dorchester	Jean-Baptiste Morin	Conservative	1896	1st term
Drummond—Arthabaska	Joseph Lavergne (until 4 August 1897 judicial appointment)	Liberal	1882	4th term
Drummond—Arthabaska	Louis Lavergne (by-election of 1897-11-13)	Liberal	1897	1st term
Gaspé	Rodolphe Lemieux	Liberal	1896	1st term
Hochelaga	Joseph Alexandre Camille Madore	Liberal	1896	1st term
Huntingdon	Julius Scriver	Liberal	1869	8th term
Jacques Cartier	Frederick Debartzch Monk	Conservative	1896	1st term
Joliette	Charles Bazinet	Liberal	1896	1st term
Kamouraska	Henry George Carroll	Liberal	1891	2nd term
Labelle	Joseph Henri Napoléon Bourassa (resigned 26 October 1899)	Liberal	1896	1st term
Labelle	Joseph Henri Napoléon Bourassa (by-election of 1900-01-18)	Independent	1896	1st term
Laprairie—Napierville	Dominique Monet	Liberal	1891	2nd term
L'Assomption	Joseph Gauthier	Liberal	1892	2nd term
Laval	Thomas Fortin	Liberal	1896	1st term
Lévis	Pierre Malcom Guay (died 19 February 1899)	Liberal	1885	4th term
Lévis	Louis Julien Demers (by-election of 1899-03-22)	Liberal	1899	1st term
L'Islet	Alphonse Arthur Miville Déchêne	Liberal	1896	1st term
Lotbinière	Côme Isaïe Rinfret (until 25 August 1899 revenue inspector appointment)	Liberal	1878	5th term
Lotbinière	Edmond Fortier (by-election of 1900-01-25)	Liberal	1900	1st term
Maisonneuve	Joseph Raymond Fournier Préfontaine	Liberal	1886	4th term
Maskinongé	Joseph Hormidas Legris	Liberal	1891	2nd term
Mégantic	Georges Turcot	Liberal	1887, 1896	2nd term*
Missisquoi	Daniel Bishop Meigs	Liberal	1888, 1896	2nd term*
Montcalm	Joseph Louis Euclide Dugas	Conservative	1891	2nd term
Montmagny	Philippe-Auguste Choquette (until 7 July 1898 judicial appointment)	Liberal	1887	3rd term
Montmagny	Pierre-Raymond-Léonard Martineau (by-election of 1898-12-14)	Liberal	1898	1st term
Montmorency	Thomas Chase Casgrain	Conservative	1896	1st term
Nicolet	Fabien Boisvert (died 12 November 1897)	Conservative	1888, 1896	2nd term*
Nicolet	Joseph Hector Leduc (by-election of 1897-12-21)	Liberal	1897	1st term
Pontiac	William Joseph Poupore	Conservative	1896	1st term
Portneuf	**Henri-Gustave Joly de Lotbinière** (until 11 July 1896 revenue appointment)	Liberal	1867, 1896	3rd term*
Portneuf	**Henri-Gustave Joly de Lotbinière** (by-election of 1896-07-30)	Liberal	1867, 1896	3rd term*
Quebec-Centre	François Charles Stanislas Langelier (until 14 January 1898 judicial appointment)	Liberal	1882	4th term
Quebec-Centre	Arthur Cyrille Albert Malouin (by-election of 1898-01-24)	Liberal	1898	1st term
Quebec County	**Charles Fitzpatrick** (until 11 July 1896 Solicitor General appointment)	Liberal	1896	1st term
Quebec County	**Charles Fitzpatrick** (by-election of 1896-07-30)	Liberal	1896	1st term
Quebec East	**Wilfrid Laurier** (until 11 July 1896 appointment as Prime Minister)	Liberal	1874	6th term
Quebec East	**Wilfrid Laurier** (by-election of 1896-07-30)	Liberal	1874	6th term
Quebec West	**Richard Reid Dobell**	Liberal	1896	1st term
Richelieu	Arthur Aimé Bruneau	Liberal	1892	2nd term
Richmond—Wolfe	Michael Thomas Stenson	Liberal	1896	1st term
Rimouski	Jean-Baptiste Romuald Fiset (until 20 October 1897 Senate appointment)	Liberal	1872, 1887, 1896	5th term*
Rimouski	Jean Auguste Ross (by-election of 1897-11-06)	Liberal	1897	1st term
Rouville	Louis Philippe Brodeur	Liberal	1878	5th term
St. Anne	Michael Joseph Francis Quinn	Conservative	1896	1st term
St. Antoine	Thomas George Roddick	Conservative	1896	1st term
St. Hyacinthe	**Michel Esdras Bernier** (until 22 June 1900 revenue appointment)	Liberal	1882	4th term
St. Hyacinthe	**Michel Esdras Bernier** (by-election of 1900-07-04)	Liberal	1882	4th term
St. James	Odilon Desmarais	Liberal	1896	1st term
St. Johns—Iberville	François Béchard (until 17 July 1896 Senate appointment)	Liberal	1867	8th term
St. Johns—Iberville	**Joseph Israël Tarte** (by-election of 1896-08-03)	Liberal	1891, 1893, 1896	3rd term*
St. Lawrence	Edward Goff Penny	Liberal	1896	1st term
St. Mary	Hercule Dupré	Liberal	1896	1st term
Shefford	Charles Henry Parmelee	Liberal	1896	1st term
Town of Sherbrooke	William Bullock Ives (died 15 July 1899)	Conservative	1882	4th term
Town of Sherbrooke	John McIntosh (by-election of 1900-01-25)	Conservative	1900	1st term
Soulanges	Augustin Bourbonnais	Liberal	1896	1st term
Stanstead	Alvin Head Moore	Conservative	1896	1st term
Témiscouata	Charles Eugène Pouliot (died 24 June 1897)	Liberal	1896	1st term
Témiscouata	Charles Arthur Gauvreau (by-election of 1897-11-06)	Liberal	1897	1st term
Terrebonne	Léon Adolphe Chauvin	Conservative	1896	1st term
Three Rivers and St. Maurice	Joseph Philippe René Adolphe Caron	Conservative	1867	8th term
Two Mountains	Joseph Arthur Calixte Éthier	Liberal	1896	1st term
Vaudreuil	Henry Stanislas Harwood	Liberal	1891	2nd term
Wright	Charles Ramsay Devlin (until 15 March 1897 immigration appointment)	Liberal	1891	2nd term
Wright	Louis Napoléon Champagne (by-election of 1897-03-23)	Liberal	1897	1st term
Yamaska	Roch Moïse Samuel Mignault	Liberal	1891	2nd term

== By-elections ==
By-election	Date	Incumbent	Party	Winner	Party	Cause	Retained
St. Hyacinthe	July 4, 1900	Michel-Esdras Bernier	Liberal	Michel-Esdras Bernier	Liberal	Recontested upon appointment as Minister of Inland Revenue	Yes
Lotbinière	January 25, 1900	Côme Isaïe Rinfret	Liberal	Edmond Fortier	Liberal	Appointment as a revenue inspector	Yes
Town of Sherbrooke	January 25, 1900	William Bullock Ives	Conservative	John McIntosh	Conservative	Death	Yes
Winnipeg	January 25, 1900	Richard Willis Jameson	Liberal	Arthur Puttee	Labour	Death	Yes
Berthier	January 18, 1900	Cléophas Beausoleil	Liberal	Joseph Éloi Archambault	Liberal	Appointed postmaster of Montreal	Yes
Labelle	January 18, 1900	Henri Bourassa	Liberal	Henri Bourassa	Independent	Resignation to recontest in protest at Canada's participation in the Boer War	No
Chambly—Verchères	January 18, 1900	Christophe-Alphonse Geoffrion	Liberal	Victor Geoffrion	Liberal	Death	Yes
Ontario West	January 18, 1900	James David Edgar	Liberal	Isaac James Gould	Liberal	Death	Yes
Brockville	April 20, 1899	John Fisher Wood	Liberal-Conservative	William Henry Comstock	Liberal	Death	No
Lévis	March 22, 1899	Pierre Malcom Guay	Liberal	Louis-Jules Demers	Liberal	Death	Yes
Huron West	February 21, 1899	Malcolm Colin Cameron	Liberal	Robert Holmes	Liberal	Appointed Lieutenant-Governor of the North-West Territories	Yes
East Prince	December 14, 1898	John Yeo	Liberal	John Howatt Bell	Liberal	Called to the Senate	Yes
Lambton West	December 14, 1898	James Frederick Lister	Liberal	Thomas George Johnston	Liberal	Appointed to the Court of Appeal	
Bagot	December 14, 1898	Flavien Dupont	Conservative	Joseph Edmond Marcile	Liberal	Death	No
Montmagny	December 14, 1898	Philippe-Auguste Choquette	Liberal	Pierre-Raymond-Léonard Martineau	Liberal	Appointed a judge of the Superior Court of Quebec	Yes
Simcoe North	December 14, 1898	Dalton McCarthy	McCarthyite	Leighton McCarthy	Independent (McCarthyite)	Death	Yes
West Prince	April 13, 1898	Stanislaus Francis Perry	Liberal	Bernard Donald McLellan	Liberal	Death	Yes
Quebec-Centre	January 24, 1898	François Langelier	Liberal	Arthur Cyrille Albert Malouin	Liberal	Appointed a judge of the Superior Court of Quebec	Yes
Nicolet	December 21, 1897	Fabien Boisvert	Conservative	Joseph Hector Leduc	Liberal	Death	No
Toronto Centre	November 30, 1897	William Lount	Liberal	George Hope Bertram	Liberal	Resignation	Yes
Drummond—Arthabaska	November 13, 1897	Joseph Lavergne	Liberal	Louis Lavergne	Liberal	Appointed a judge of the Superior Court of Quebec	Yes
Témiscouata	November 6, 1897	Charles-Eugène Pouliot	Liberal	Charles Arthur Gauvreau	Liberal	Death	Yes
Rimouski	November 6, 1897	Jean-Baptiste Romuald Fiset	Liberal	Jean Auguste Ross	Liberal	Called to the Senate	Yes
West Prince	April 27, 1897	Edward Hackett	Liberal-Conservative	Stanislaus Francis Perry	Liberal	Election declared void	No
Macdonald	April 27, 1897	Nathaniel Boyd	Conservative	John Gunion Rutherford	Liberal	Election declared void	No
Winnipeg	April 27, 1897	Hugh John Macdonald	Liberal-Conservative	Richard Willis Jameson	Liberal	Election declared void	No
Colchester	April 20, 1897	Wilbert David Dimock	Conservative	Firman McClure	Liberal	Election declared void	No
Champlain	April 7, 1897	François-Arthur Marcotte	Conservative	François-Arthur Marcotte	Conservative	Election declared void	Yes
Wright	March 23, 1897	Charles Ramsay Devlin	Liberal	Louis Napoléon Champagne	Liberal	Appointed Canadian trade commissioner to Ireland	Yes
Bonaventure	March 17, 1897	William LeBoutillier Fauvel	Liberal	Jean-François Guité	Liberal	Death	Yes
Simcoe East	February 4, 1897	William Humphrey Bennett	Conservative	William Humphrey Bennett	Conservative	Election declared void	Yes
Ontario North	February 4, 1897	John Alexander McGillivray	Conservative	Duncan Graham	Independent Liberal	Election declared void	No
Brant South	February 4, 1897	Robert Henry	Conservative	Charles Bernhard Heyd	Liberal	Election declared void	No
Saskatchewan (Provisional District)	December 19, 1896	Wilfrid Laurier	Liberal	Thomas Osborne Davis	Liberal	Laurier was elected to two seats, resigned to run in ministerial by-election in Quebec East	Yes
Cornwall and Stormont	December 19, 1896	Darby Bergin	Liberal-Conservative	John Goodall Snetsinger	Liberal	Death	No
Brandon	November 27, 1896	Dalton McCarthy	McCarthyite	Clifford Sifton	Liberal	Chose to sit for Simcoe North	No
Sunbury—Queen's	August 25, 1896	George G. King	Liberal	Andrew George Blair	Liberal	Called to Senate	Yes
Grey North	August 25, 1896	John Clark	Liberal	William Paterson	Liberal	Death	Yes
Shelburne and Queen's	August 5, 1896	Francis Gordon Forbes	Liberal	William Stevens Fielding	Liberal	Appointed Sub-Collector of Customs	Yes
St. Johns—Iberville	August 3, 1896	François Béchard	Liberal	Joseph Israël Tarte	Liberal	Called to the Senate	Yes
Quebec County	July 30, 1896	Charles Fitzpatrick	Liberal	Charles Fitzpatrick	Liberal	Recontested upon appointment as Solicitor General	Yes
Kings	July 30, 1896	Frederick William Borden	Liberal	Frederick William Borden	Liberal	Recontested upon appointment as Minister of Militia and Defence	Yes
Oxford South	July 30, 1896	Richard John Cartwright	Liberal	Richard John Cartwright	Liberal	Recontested upon appointment as Minister of Trade and Commerce	Yes
West Queen's	July 30, 1896	Louis Henry Davies	Liberal	Louis Henry Davies	Liberal	Recontested upon appointment as Minister of Marine and Fisheries	Yes
Brome	July 30, 1896	Sydney Arthur Fisher	Liberal	Sydney Arthur Fisher	Liberal	Recontested upon appointment as Minister of Agriculture	Yes
Portneuf	July 30, 1896	Henri-Gustave Joly de Lotbinière	Liberal	Henri-Gustave Joly de Lotbinière	Liberal	Recontested upon appointment as Controller of Inland Revenue	Yes
York North	July 30, 1896	William Mulock	Liberal	William Mulock	Liberal	Recontested upon appointment as Postmaster-General	Yes
Quebec East	July 30, 1896	Wilfrid Laurier	Liberal	Wilfrid Laurier	Liberal	Recontested upon appointment as Prime Minister	Yes
