= List of Canadian electoral districts (1867–1871) =

This is a list of electoral districts or ridings in Canada for the 1867 Canadian federal election, according to the British North America Act, 1867. New seats were added in 1871, when British Columbia became a province of Canada.

Electoral districts are constituencies that elect members of Parliament in Canada's House of Commons every election.

== Nova Scotia – 19 seats ==
- Annapolis
- Antigonish
- Cape Breton
- Colchester
- Cumberland
- Digby
- Guysborough
- Halifax (returned two members, elected through Block Voting)
- Hants
- Inverness
- Kings
- Lunenburg
- Pictou
- Queens
- Richmond
- Shelburne
- Victoria
- Yarmouth

== New Brunswick – 15 seats ==
- Albert
- Carleton
- Charlotte
- City and County of St. John
- City of St. John
- Gloucester
- Kent
- King's
- Northumberland
- Queen's
- Restigouche
- Sunbury
- Victoria
- Westmorland
- York

== Quebec – 65 seats ==
- Argenteuil
- Bagot
- Beauce
- Beauharnois
- Bellechasse
- Berthier
- Bonaventure
- Brome
- Chambly
- Champlain
- Charlevoix
- Châteauguay
- Chicoutimi—Saguenay
- Compton
- Dorchester
- Drummond—Arthabaska
- Gaspé
- Hochelaga
- Huntingdon
- Iberville
- Jacques Cartier
- Joliette
- Kamouraska**
- L'Assomption
- L'Islet
- Laprairie
- Laval
- Lévis
- Lotbinière
- Maskinongé
- Mégantic
- Missisquoi
- Montcalm
- Montmagny
- Montmorency
- Montreal Centre
- Montreal East
- Montreal West
- Napierville
- Nicolet
- Ottawa (County of)
- Pontiac
- Portneuf
- Quebec County
- Quebec East
- Quebec West
- Quebec-Centre
- Richelieu
- Richmond—Wolfe
- Rimouski
- Rouville
- Saint Maurice
- Shefford
- Town of Sherbrooke
- Soulanges
- St. Hyacinthe
- St. John's
- Stanstead
- Témiscouata
- Terrebonne
- Three Rivers
- Two Mountains
- Vaudreuil
- Verchères
- Yamaska

== Ontario – 82 seats ==
- Addington
- Algoma
- Bothwell
- Brant North
- Brant South
- Brockville
- Bruce North
- Bruce South
- Cardwell
- Carleton
- Cornwall
- Dundas
- Durham East
- Durham West
- Elgin East
- Elgin West
- Essex
- Frontenac
- Glengarry
- Grenville South
- Grey North
- Grey South
- Haldimand
- Halton
- Hamilton
- Hastings East
- Hastings North
- Hastings West
- Huron North
- Huron South
- Kent
- Kingston
- Lambton
- Lanark North
- Lanark South
- Leeds North and Grenville North
- Leeds South
- Lennox
- Lincoln
- London
- Middlesex East
- Middlesex North
- Middlesex West
- Monck
- Niagara
- Norfolk North
- Norfolk South
- Northumberland East
- Northumberland West
- Ontario North
- Ontario South
- Ottawa (City of) (electoral district)
- Oxford North
- Oxford South
- Peel
- Perth North
- Perth South
- Peterborough East
- Peterborough West
- Prescott
- Prince Edward
- Renfrew North
- Renfrew South
- Russell
- Simcoe North
- Simcoe South
- Stormont
- Toronto East
- Victoria North
- Victoria South
- Waterloo North
- Waterloo South
- Welland
- Wellington Centre
- Wellington North
- Wellington South
- Wentworth North
- Wentworth South
- West Toronto
- York East
- York North
- York West

*Returned two members
**1867 election postponed due to rioting

Preceded by 8th Parliament of the Province of Canada, 23rd General Assembly of Nova Scotia, 21st New Brunswick Legislature	Historical federal electoral districts of Canada	Succeeded by Electoral districts (1871–1872)
