= List of Canadian electoral districts (1871–1872) =

This is a list of electoral districts or ridings in Canada from 1871 to 1872, according to the British North America Act. No elections were held at this time, except to elect new members from Manitoba which joined confederation in 1870. New seats were added in 1872 as British Columbia had joined Confederation as a province the year before, with special byelections being called to fill the seats and temporary seatnames until the general election. Of these, only two seats (New Westminster District and Vancouver) were contested, the others being filled by acclamation.

Electoral districts are constituencies that elect members of Parliament in Canada's House of Commons every election.

== Nova Scotia – 19 seats ==
- Annapolis
- Antigonish
- Cape Breton
- Colchester
- Cumberland
- Digby
- Guysborough
- Halifax*
- Hants
- Inverness
- Kings
- Lunenburg
- Pictou
- Queens
- Richmond
- Shelburne
- Victoria
- Yarmouth

== New Brunswick – 15 seats ==
- Albert
- Carleton
- Charlotte
- City and County of St. John
- City of St. John
- Gloucester
- Kent
- King's
- Northumberland
- Queen's
- Restigouche
- Sunbury
- Victoria
- Westmorland
- York

== Quebec – 65 seats ==
- Argenteuil
- Bagot
- Beauce
- Beauharnois
- Bellechasse
- Berthier
- Bonaventure
- Brome
- Chambly
- Champlain
- Charlevoix
- Châteauguay
- Chicoutimi—Saguenay
- Compton
- Dorchester
- Drummond—Arthabaska
- Gaspé
- Hochelaga
- Huntingdon
- Iverbville
- Jacques Cartier
- Joliette
- Kamouraska
- L'Assomption
- L'Islet
- Laprairie
- Laval
- Lévis
- Lotbinière
- Maskinogé
- Mégantic
- Missisquoi
- Montcalm
- Montmagny
- Montmorency
- Montreal Centre
- Montreal East
- Montreal West
- Napierville
- Nicolet
- Ottawa (County of)
- Pontiac
- Portneuf
- Quebec County
- Quebec East
- Quebec West
- Quebec-Centre
- Richelieu
- Richmond—Wolfe
- Rimouski
- Rouville
- Saint Maurice
- Shefford
- Town of Sherbrooke
- Soulanges
- St. Hyacinthe
- St. John's
- Stanstead
- Témiscouata
- Terrebonne
- Three Rivers
- Two Mountains
- Vaudreuil
- Verchères
- Yamaska

== Ontario – 82 seats ==
- Addington
- Algoma
- Bothwell
- Brant North
- Brant South
- Brockville
- Bruce North
- Bruce South
- Cardwell
- Carleton
- Cornwall
- Dundas
- Durham East
- Durham West
- Elgin East
- Elgin West
- Essex
- Frontenac
- Glengarry
- Grenville South
- Grey North
- Grey South
- Haldimand
- Halton
- Hamilton
- Hastings East
- Hastings North
- Hastings West
- Huron North
- Huron South
- Kent
- Kingston
- Lambton
- Lanark North
- Lanark South
- Leeds North and Grenville North
- Leeds South
- Lennox
- Lincoln
- Middlesex East
- Middlesex North
- Middlesex West
- Monck
- Niagara
- Norfolk North
- Norfolk South
- Northumberland East
- Northumberland West
- Ontario North
- Ontario South
- Ottawa (City of)
- Oxford North
- Oxford South
- Peel
- Perth North
- Perth South
- Peterborough East
- Peterborough West
- Prescott
- Prince Edward
- Renfrew North
- Renfrew South
- Russell
- Simcoe North
- Simcoe South
- Stormont
- Toronto East
- Victoria North
- Victoria South
- Waterloo North
- Waterloo South
- Welland
- Wellington Centre
- Wellington North
- Wellington South
- Wentworth North
- Wentworth South
- West Toronto
- York East
- York North
- York West

== Manitoba – 4 seats ==
- Lisgar
- Marquette**
- Provencher
- Selkirk

== British Columbia – 6 seats ==
- New Westminster District
- Victoria District*
- Cariboo District
- Yale District
- Vancouver Island

*Returned two members
**Returned two members due to a tie
