= Iberville =

Iberville may refer to:

== Person ==
- Pierre Le Moyne d'Iberville, French explorer and colonist, founder of Louisiana

== Electoral districts in Canada ==
- Iberville (Manitoba provincial electoral district)
- Iberville (Quebec provincial electoral district)
- Iberville (federal electoral district), federal electoral district
- Saint-Jean—Iberville—Napierville, federal electoral district
- St. Johns—Iberville—Napierville, federal electoral district
- St. Johns—Iberville, federal electoral district

== Other ==
- Iberville Parish, Louisiana, USA
- Iberville Projects, a neighbourhood of New Orleans, USA
- Iberville River, historical name of Bayou Manchac in Louisiana
- Iberville, Quebec
- SS Iberville, multiple ships
