= Brant South =

Former federal electoral district in Ontario, Canada

Ontario electoral district

Defunct federal electoral district
- Legislature: House of Commons
- District created: 1867
- District abolished: 1903
- First contested: 1867
- Last contested: 1900

Brant South was a federal and provincial electoral district in Ontario, Canada, that was represented in the House of Commons of Canada from 1867 to 1904, and in the Legislative Assembly of Ontario from 1867 to 1923.

It was also called the South Riding of Brant. Brant County was named after Joseph Brant, a Mohawk Chief originally from New York State who settled the area, centred on Brantford.

== History ==
=== Federal ===
The federal riding was created by the British North America Act 1867, which divided the county of Brant into two ridings: Brant North and Brant South according to a traditional division. In 1882, the South Riding of Brant was defined to consist of the townships of West Brantford, Onondaga and Tuscarora, the city of Brantford and the town of Paris.

The electoral district was abolished in 1903 when it was merged into Brantford riding.

The first member of Parliament for Brant South, elected in 1867 was Edmund Burke Wood. Wood was also elected to the Provincial Parliament. Eventually an act was passed to abolish dual representation.

In 1872, the Liberal candidate, William Paterson (a biscuit manufacturer) won the riding, and remained Member of Parliament until 1896, when he was defeated by Robert Henry (a grocer, and Conservative).

This election was declared void, and in a by-election Charles Bernhard Heyd (a Liberal, and also a grocer) won the riding. Heyd held the riding until it was abolished in 1903.

==== Members of Parliament ====
This riding has elected the following members of Parliament:

Parliament	Years	Member	Party
1st	1867–1872	Edmund Burke Wood	Liberal
2nd	1872–1874	William Paterson	Liberal
3rd	1874–1878	William Paterson	Liberal
4th	1878–1882	William Paterson	Liberal
5th	1882–1887	William Paterson	Liberal
6th	1887–1891	William Paterson	Liberal
7th	1891–1896	William Paterson	Liberal
8th	1896–1896	Robert Henry	Conservative
8th	1897–1900	Charles Bernhard Heyd	Liberal
9th	1900–1904	Charles Bernhard Heyd	Liberal
Riding dissolved into Brant and Brantford

=== Provincial ===
The provincial riding was also created in 1867.

The first Member of the Legislative Assembly for Brant South was Edmund Burke Wood. Wood was also elected to the first federal parliament. When an act was passed to abolish dual representation, Wood choose to remain in the provincial parliament.

In 1871, Arthur Sturgis Hardy won the riding. He held it until his death in 1889. Thomas H. Preston held the riding from 1899 until 1908. Willoughby Staples Brewster held the riding from 1908 until 1914. Joseph Henry Ham held the riding from 1914 until 1919. Morrison Mann MacBride held the riding from 1919 until 1923, when the provincial riding became the Brantford riding in 1923.

== Federal election results ==
1867 Canadian federal election
Party	Candidate	Votes
Liberal	Edmund Burke Wood	1,257
Unknown	H. B. Leeming	1,090
Eligible voters		3,269
Source: Canadian Parliamentary Guide, 1871

1872 Canadian federal election
Party	Candidate	Votes
Liberal	William Paterson	1,378
Liberal–Conservative	Sir Francis Hincks	1,116
Source: Canadian Elections Database

1874 Canadian federal election
Party	Candidate	Votes
Liberal	William Paterson	1,463
Unknown	Alfred Watts	1,019

1878 Canadian federal election
Party	Candidate	Votes
Liberal	William Paterson	1,496
Unknown	Alfred Watts	1,298
Source: Canadian Elections Database

1882 Canadian federal election
Party	Candidate	Votes
Liberal	William Paterson	1,473
Conservative	Alfred Watts	1,297

1887 Canadian federal election
Party	Candidate	Votes
Liberal	William Paterson	2,230
Conservative	William Foster Cockshutt	1,656

1891 Canadian federal election
Party	Candidate	Votes
Liberal	William Paterson	1,963
Unknown	Peter H. Cox	1,421

1896 Canadian federal election
Party	Candidate	Votes
Conservative	Robert Henry	2,538
Liberal	Wm. Paterson	2,447

On Mr. Henry's election being declared void and on his being unseated, 15 December 1896:

By-election on 4 February 1897
Party	Candidate	Votes
Liberal	C. B. Heyd	2,787
Conservative	Robert Henry	2,406

1900 Canadian federal election
Party	Candidate	Votes
Liberal	Charles B. Heyd	2,494
Conservative	Robert Henry	2,288

== See also ==
- List of Canadian electoral districts
- Historical federal electoral districts of Canada
