= Aldéric-Joseph Benoit =

Canadian politician (1877–1968)

Member of the Canadian Parliament for St. Johns—Iberville
- In office 1922–1930
- Preceded by: Marie-Joseph Demers
- Succeeded by: Martial Rhéaume

Personal details
- Born: December 26, 1877 Saint-Grégoire, Quebec, Canada
- Died: July 16, 1968 (aged 90) Saint-Jean-sur-Richelieu, Quebec, Canada
- Party: Liberal
- Occupation: farmer, hay and grain dealer

Aldéric-Joseph Benoit (December 26, 1877 – July 16, 1968) was a Canadian politician. He was elected to the House of Commons of Canada as a Member of the Liberal Party in 1922 to represent the riding of St. Johns—Iberville. He was re-elected in 1925 and 1926.
