= Brant South (provincial electoral district) =

Brant South Brantford
Ontario electoral district

Defunct provincial electoral district
- Legislature: Legislative Assembly of Ontario
- District created: 1867
- District abolished: 1933
- First contested: 1867
- Last contested: 1923

Brant South was an electoral riding in Ontario, Canada. It was created in 1867 at the time of confederation and was abolished at the 1926 provincial election

== Members of Provincial Parliament ==
Brant South
Assembly	Years	Member	Party
1st	1867–1871	Edmund Burke Wood	Conservative
2nd	1871–1873	Edmund Burke Wood	Conservative
2nd	1873–1875	Arthur Sturgis Hardy	Liberal
3rd	1875–1879	Arthur Sturgis Hardy	Liberal
4th	1879–1883	Arthur Sturgis Hardy	Liberal
5th	1883–1886	Arthur Sturgis Hardy	Liberal
6th	1886–1890	Arthur Sturgis Hardy	Liberal
7th	1890–1894	Arthur Sturgis Hardy	Liberal
8th	1894–1898	Arthur Sturgis Hardy	Liberal
9th	1898–1899	Arthur Sturgis Hardy	Liberal
9th	1899–1902	Thomas Hiram Preston	Liberal
10th	1902–1904	Thomas Hiram Preston	Liberal
11th	1905–1908	Thomas Hiram Preston	Liberal
12th	1908–1911	Willoughby Staples Brewster	Conservative
13th	1911–1914	Willoughby Staples Brewster	Conservative
14th	1914–1919	Joseph Henry Ham	Liberal
15th	1919–1923	M.M. MacBride	Labour
16th	1923–1926	M.M. MacBride	Labour
Sourced from the Ontario Legislative Assembly
Merged into Brantford before 1926 election

== Election results ==
1923 Ontario general election
Party	Candidate	Votes	%	±%
Labour	Morrison Mann MacBride	5,678	53.26	+6.71
Liberal	John W. Shepperson	4,983	46.74	+17.46
Total valid votes		10,661	98.57	
Total rejected ballots		155	1.43	–1.56
Turnout		10,816	59.64	–21.38
Eligible voters		18,136		
Labour hold		Swing		–5.37
Source: Elections Ontario

1919 Ontario general election
Party	Candidate	Votes	%	±%
Labour	Morrison Mann MacBride	6,408	46.55	–
Liberal	Morgan Ernest Harris	4,031	29.28	–23.21
Conservative	Willoughby Staples Brewster	3,326	24.16	–23.34
Total valid votes		13,765	97.01	
Total rejected ballots		424	2.99	+1.83
Turnout		14,189	81.02	+1.23
Eligible voters		17,514		
Labour gain from Liberal		Swing		+11.67
Source: Elections Ontario

1914 Ontario general election
Party	Candidate	Votes	%	±%
Liberal	Joseph Henry Ham	3,594	52.50	+5.69
Conservative	Willoughby Staples Brewster	3,252	47.50	–5.69
Total valid votes		6,846	98.84	
Total rejected ballots		80	1.16	+0.07
Turnout		6,926	79.78	+2.76
Eligible voters		8,681		
Liberal gain from Conservative		Swing		+5.69
Source: Elections Ontario

1911 Ontario general election
Party	Candidate	Votes	%	±%
Conservative	Willoughby Staples Brewster	3,201	53.19	+1.36
Liberal	Morgan Ernest Harris	2,817	46.81	–1.36
Total valid votes		6,018	98.92	
Total rejected ballots		66	1.08	+0.46
Turnout		6,084	77.02	–9.89
Eligible voters		7,899		
Conservative hold		Swing		+1.36
Source: Elections Ontario

1908 Ontario general election
Party	Candidate	Votes	%	±%
Conservative	Willoughby Staples Brewster	2,815	51.83	+3.09
Liberal	Martin William McEwen	2,616	48.17	–3.09
Total valid votes		5,431	99.38	
Total rejected ballots		34	0.62	+0.18
Turnout		5,465	86.91	+0.63
Eligible voters		6,288		
Conservative gain from Liberal		Swing		+3.09
Source: Elections Ontario

1905 Ontario general election
Party	Candidate	Votes	%	±%
Liberal	Thomas Hiram Preston	3,091	51.26	–2.06
Conservative	Willoughby Staples Brewster	2,939	48.74	+2.06
Total valid votes		6,030	99.55	
Total rejected ballots		27	0.45	–0.52
Turnout		6,057	86.28	+10.31
Eligible voters		7,020		
Liberal hold		Swing		–2.06
Source: Elections Ontario

1902 Ontario general election
Party	Candidate	Votes	%	±%
Liberal	Thomas Hiram Preston	2,727	53.32	–0.50
Conservative	John Fraser	2,387	46.68	+0.50
Total valid votes		5,114	99.03	
Total rejected ballots		50	0.97	+0.97
Turnout		5,164	75.97	–
Eligible voters		6,797		
Liberal hold		Swing		–0.50
Source: Elections Ontario

Ontario provincial by-election, 1899
Party	Candidate	Votes	%	±%
Liberal	Thomas Hiram Preston	2,932	53.83	–0.92
Conservative	Robert Henry	2,515	46.17	+0.92
Total valid votes		5,447	100.00	
Total rejected ballots		–		
Turnout		5,447	–	–
Eligible voters				
Liberal hold		Swing		–0.92
Source: Elections Ontario

1898 Ontario general election
Party	Candidate	Votes	%	±%
Liberal	Arthur Sturgis Hardy	3,038	54.75	–1.99
Conservative	George Elliott	2,511	45.25	–
Total valid votes		5,549	99.25	
Total rejected ballots		42	0.75	–0.07
Turnout		5,591	84.73	+5.17
Eligible voters		6,599		
Liberal hold		Swing		–1.00
Source: Elections Ontario

1894 Ontario general election
Party	Candidate	Votes	%	±%
Liberal	Arthur Sturgis Hardy	2,597	56.74	–2.32
Protestant Protective	J. E. Hopkins	1,980	43.26	–
Total valid votes		4,577	99.18	
Total rejected ballots		38	0.82	+0.09
Turnout		4,615	79.56	+14.54
Eligible voters		5,801		
Liberal hold		Swing		–1.16
Source: Elections Ontario

1890 Ontario general election
Party	Candidate	Votes	%	±%
Liberal	Arthur Sturgis Hardy	2,067	59.06	–1.52
Conservative	Thomas Lloyd-Jones	1,433	40.94	+1.52
Total valid votes		3,500	99.26	
Total rejected ballots		26	0.74	+0.67
Turnout		3,526	65.02	+7.18
Eligible voters		5,423		
Liberal hold		Swing		–1.52
Source: Elections Ontario

1886 Ontario general election
Party	Candidate	Votes	%	±%
Liberal	Arthur Sturgis Hardy	1,881	60.58	–0.31
Conservative	Thomas Lloyd-Jones	1,224	39.42	+0.31
Total valid votes		3,105	99.94	
Total rejected ballots		2	0.06	–0.09
Turnout		3,107	57.84	+3.10
Eligible voters		5,372		
Liberal hold		Swing		–0.31
Source: Elections Ontario

1883 Ontario general election
Party	Candidate	Votes	%	±%
Liberal	Arthur Sturgis Hardy	1,563	60.89	+4.02
Conservative	Mr. Huffman	1,004	39.11	–4.02
Total valid votes		2,567	99.84	
Total rejected ballots		4	0.16	+0.16
Turnout		2,571	54.74	–6.19
Eligible voters		4,697		
Liberal hold		Swing		+4.02
Source: Elections Ontario

1879 Ontario general election
Party	Candidate	Votes	%
Liberal	Arthur Sturgis Hardy	1,622	56.87
Conservative	Mr. Wilson	1,230	43.13
Total valid votes		2,852	60.93
Eligible voters		4,681	
Liberal hold			
Source: Elections Ontario

Ontario provincial by-election, March 1877 Ministerial by-election
Party	Candidate	Votes
Liberal	Arthur Sturgis Hardy	Acclaimed
Source: History of the Electoral Districts, Legislatures and Ministries of the Province of Ontario

1875 Ontario general election
Party	Candidate	Votes
Liberal	Arthur Sturgis Hardy	Acclaimed
Source: Elections Ontario

Ontario provincial by-election, May 1873 Resignation of Edmund Burke Wood
Party	Candidate	Votes	%	±%
Liberal	Arthur Sturgis Hardy	1,288	53.76	+6.45
Independent	John Joseph Hawkins	1,108	46.24	
Total valid votes		2,396	100.0	+7.73
Liberal gain from Conservative		Swing		+6.45
Source: History of the Electoral Districts, Legislatures and Ministries of the Province of Ontario

1871 Ontario general election
Party	Candidate	Votes	%	±%
Conservative	Edmund Burke Wood	1,172	52.70	−1.68
Liberal	Mr. Plewes	1,052	47.30	+1.68
Turnout		2,224	66.55	−4.90
Eligible voters		3,342		
Conservative hold		Swing		−1.68
Source: Elections Ontario

1867 Ontario general election
Party	Candidate	Votes	%
Conservative	Edmund Burke Wood	1,268	54.37
Liberal	H. Biggar	1,064	45.63
Total valid votes		2,332	71.45
Eligible voters		3,264	
Conservative pickup new district.			
Source: Elections Ontario
