= James Yeo (politician) =

Canadian politician

James Yeo (October 31, 1827 – February 13, 1903) was a Canadian merchant, ship builder, ship owner, and Member of Parliament in the House of Commons of Canada for Prince Edward Island, representing Prince County beginning in 1873 when Prince Edward Island joined Canadian Confederation and serving until 1891.

Yeo was born in Port Hill, Prince Edward Island, the son of James Yeo, who was a native of Cornwall, England, and Damaris Sargent. In 1855, he married Sarah Jane Glover. He served as a member of the Legislative Assembly of Prince Edward Island representing the 2nd Prince from 1872 to 1873 and was a member of the Executive Council. He was elected to the House of Commons as a Liberal member. Yeo lived most of his life in Port Hill and died in Wellington at the age of 75.

His brother John succeeded him as the member for Prince County in the House of Commons and later served in the Senate.

Canadian federal by-election, 29 September 1873
Party	Candidate	Votes	Elected	
Conservative	James Colledge Pope	acclaimed		X
Liberal	James Yeo	acclaimed		X
Called as a result of Prince Edward Island joining Confederation 1 July 1873

1874 Canadian federal election: Prince County
Party	Candidate	Votes	Elected	
Liberal	James Yeo	2,188		X
Liberal	Stanislaus Francis Perry	1,804		X
Unknown	John Ramsay	669		
Unknown	F. McNeill	337		

1878 Canadian federal election: Prince County
Party	Candidate	Votes	Elected	
Liberal	James Yeo	1,716		X
Liberal–Conservative	Edward Hackett	1,655		X
Unknown	C. Howatt	1,605		
Liberal	Stanislaus Francis Perry	1,491		

1882 Canadian federal election: Prince County
Party	Candidate	Votes	Elected	
Liberal	James Yeo	2,388		X
Liberal–Conservative	Edward Hackett	2,325		X
Liberal	Stanislaus Francis Perry	2,178		
Unknown	D. Rogers	2,134		

1887 Canadian federal election: Prince County
Party	Candidate	Votes	Elected	
Liberal	James Yeo	3,184		X
Liberal	Stanislaus Francis Perry	2,988		X
Liberal–Conservative	Edward Hackett	2,763		
Conservative	John Lefurgey	2,600		
