= Thomas Bain =

Canadian politician

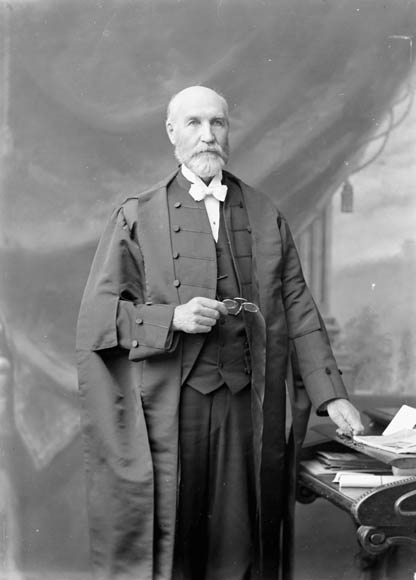

8th Speaker of the House of Commons of Canada
- In office 1 August 1899 – 5 February 1901
- Preceded by: James David Edgar
- Succeeded by: Louis Philippe Brodeur

Member of the Canadian Parliament for Wentworth South
- In office 1896–1900
- Preceded by: Franklin Metcalfe Carpenter
- Succeeded by: E. D. Smith

Member of the Canadian Parliament for Wentworth North
- In office 1872–1896
- Preceded by: James McMonies
- Succeeded by: Electoral district was abolished

Personal details
- Born: 14 December 1834 Denny, Stirlingshire, Scotland
- Died: 18 January 1915 (aged 80) Dundas, Ontario
- Party: Liberal
- Spouse: Helen Weir
- Portfolio: Speaker of the House of Commons (1898-1901)

Thomas Bain (14 December 1834 – 18 January 1915) was a Scottish born Canadian parliamentarian.

== Biography ==
Bain was born in Scotland, the son of Walter Bain, and migrated to Canada with his family when he was three years old. They settled on a bush farm in Wentworth County near Hamilton, Ontario.

He was elected to the County Council in the 1860s and became Warden. He was first elected to the House of Commons of Canada in the 1872 federal election as a Liberal. He was re-elected on six subsequent occasions, serving as an MP for 28 years before retiring in 1900. In the House, he usually spoke on agricultural issues, and became Chairman of the Committee on Agriculture and Colonization in 1896.

In 1874, he married Helen Weir.

When the Speaker of the House of Commons of Canada, James David Edgar, died unexpectedly in July 1899, Wilfrid Laurier asked Bain to become the new Speaker for the remainder of Egar's term.

Bain served as Speaker until the House was dissolved for the 1900 election in which he did not run.

After retiring from politics, Bain became President of the Landed Banking and Loan Company and the Malcolm and Souter Furniture Company. He died in Dundas, Ontario at age 80.

== Electoral record ==
1896 Canadian federal election: Wentworth South
Party	Candidate	Votes	%	±%
Liberal	Thomas Bain	2,673		
Conservative	Andrew H. Pettit	2,486		

1872 Canadian federal election: Wentworth North
Party	Candidate	Votes	%	±%
Liberal	Thomas Bain	1,145		
Unknown	R. McKechnie	1,040		

1874 Canadian federal election: Wentworth North
Party	Candidate	Votes	%	±%
Liberal	Thomas Bain	acclaimed		
Source: lop.parl.ca

1878 Canadian federal election: Wentworth North
Party	Candidate	Votes	%	±%
Liberal	Thomas Bain	1,343		
Unknown	Thos. Stock	1,237		

1882 Canadian federal election: Wentworth North
Party	Candidate	Votes	%	±%
Liberal	Thomas Bain	1,295		
Unknown	Robt. McKechnie Jr.	1,292		

1887 Canadian federal election: Wentworth North
Party	Candidate	Votes	%	±%
Liberal	Thomas Bain	1,639		
Conservative	T.B. Townsend	1,513		

1891 Canadian federal election: Wentworth North
Party	Candidate	Votes	%	±%
Liberal	Thomas Bain	1,517		
Conservative	Alex R. Wardell	1,317		

== Archives ==
There is a Thomas Bain fonds at Library and Archives Canada. Archival reference number is R11196.
