= Edmund Burke Wood =

Canadian politician

Edmond Burke Wood
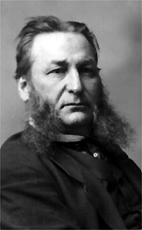

Member of Parliament for Durham West
- In office 1873–1874
- Preceded by: Edward Blake
- Succeeded by: Harvey William Burk

Member of Parliament for Brant South
- In office 1867–1872
- Preceded by: Riding established
- Succeeded by: William Paterson

Ontario MPP
- In office 1867–1873
- Preceded by: Riding established
- Succeeded by: Arthur Sturgis Hardy
- Constituency: Brant South

Personal details
- Born: February 13, 1820 Fort Erie, Ontario
- Died: October 7, 1882 (aged 62) Winnipeg, Manitoba
- Party: Conservative provincially and Liberal federally
- Spouse: Jane Augusta Marter (m. 1855)
- Children: 6
- Occupation: Lawyer

Edmund Burke Wood (February 13, 1820 – October 7, 1882) was a Member of the Legislative Assembly of Ontario for Brant South, and served as the first provincial treasurer of Ontario from 1867 to 1871 under Premier John Sandfield Macdonald. He also served as a federal Member of Parliament representing the electoral districts of Brant South and Durham West from 1867–1874 under Prime Minister Sir John A. Macdonald.

He later became Chief Justice of the Supreme Court of Manitoba from 1874 to 1882. He died as Chief Justice in 1882.

== Electoral history ==
=== Federal ===
1867 Canadian federal election: Brant South
Party	Candidate	Votes
Liberal	Edmund Burke Wood	1,257
Unknown	H. B. Leeming	1,090
Eligible voters		3,269
Source: Canadian Parliamentary Guide, 1871

=== Provincial ===
1871 Ontario general election: Brant South
Party	Candidate	Votes	%	±%
Conservative	Edmund Burke Wood	1,172	52.70	−1.68
Liberal	Mr. Plewes	1,052	47.30	+1.68
Turnout		2,224	66.55	−4.90
Eligible voters		3,342		
Conservative hold		Swing		−1.68
Source: Elections Ontario

1867 Ontario general election: Brant South
Party	Candidate	Votes	%
Conservative	Edmund Burke Wood	1,268	54.37
Liberal	H. Biggar	1,064	45.63
Total valid votes		2,332	71.45
Eligible voters		3,264	
Conservative pickup new district.			
Source: Elections Ontario

Political offices
Preceded by None - new post or see Treasurer of the United Provinces of Canada	Provincial Treasurer of Ontario; 1867–1871	Succeeded by Adam Crooks
