= Alexis-Louis Demers =

Canadian politician

Alexis-Louis Demers (July 23, 1825 – October 22, 1886) was a farmer, merchant and political figure in Quebec. He represented Iberville in the Legislative Assembly of Quebec from 1881 to 1886 as a Liberal.

He was born in Saint-Jean-Chrysostome, Lower Canada, the son of Alexis Demers and Josephte Bessette. He was a notary clerk for his uncle Narcisse Demers. Demers was also a justice of the peace and captain in the militia. He was secretary-treasurer and then mayor for Saint-Georges d'Henryville. Demers was married twice: to Marie-Julie Brazeau in 1849 and to Marie Goyette in 1855. He was reelected in 1886 but died in office eight days later at the age of 61 in Henryville.

His sons Louis-Philippe and Joseph served in the Canadian House of Commons.
