= William Paterson (Canadian politician) =

Canadian politician

The Honourable William Paterson PC
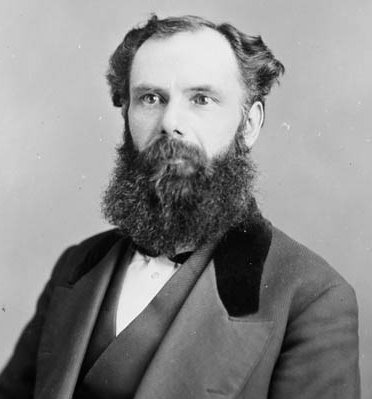

Member of the Canadian Parliament for Brant South
- In office 1872–1896
- Preceded by: Edmund Burke Wood
- Succeeded by: Robert Henry

Member of the Canadian Parliament for Grey North
- In office 1896–1900
- Preceded by: John Clark
- Succeeded by: Edward H. Horsey

Member of the Canadian Parliament for Wentworth North and Brant
- In office 1900–1904
- Preceded by: James Somerville
- Succeeded by: The electoral district was abolished in 1903.

Member of the Canadian Parliament for Brant
- In office 1904–1914
- Preceded by: The electoral district was created in 1903.
- Succeeded by: John Fisher

Personal details
- Born: September 19, 1839 Hamilton, Upper Canada
- Died: March 18, 1914 (aged 74) Picton, Ontario, Canada
- Party: Liberal
- Spouse: Lucy Olive Davies
- Cabinet: Controller of Customs (1896-1897); Minister of Customs (1897-1911)

William Paterson, PC (September 19, 1839 – March 18, 1914) was a Canadian politician.

Paterson was born in Hamilton, Upper Canada, the son of James and Martha Paterson. His parents died from cholera in 1849 and he was adopted by Reverend Dr. Ferrier, a Presbyterian minister. He was educated in Hamilton and Caledonia. He moved to Brantford and became a manufacturer of biscuits and confectionery (William Paterson Limited was sold to George Weston in 1928 ). He married Lucy Olive Davies in 1863.

He was first elected to the House of Commons of Canada in the Brant South riding in the 1872 election. The Liberal politician was re-elected in 1874, 1878, 1882, 1887, and 1891. He was defeated in the 1896 election but was elected in an 1896 by-election in Grey North, when the candidate elected for this riding died before the opening of the 9th Parliament. In 1900, he was elected in the riding of Wentworth North and Brant. He was elected in 1904 and 1908 in the riding of Brant but was defeated in 1911. From 1896 to 1897, he was Controller of Customs and from 1897 to 1911 was Minister of Customs.

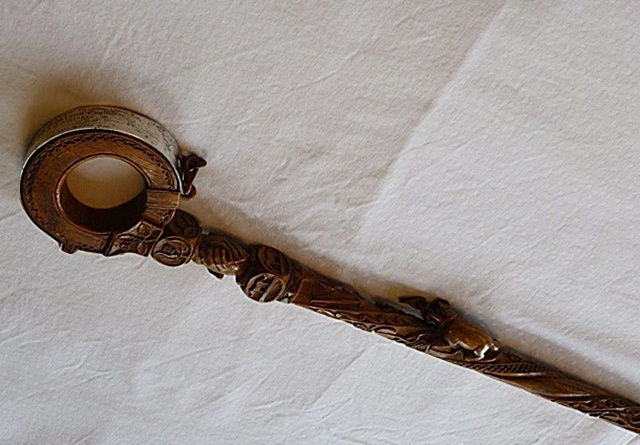
A walking cane presented to William Paterson on being elected to Parliament in 1872

While Minister of Customs, he and W.A. Fielding, Minister Finance, negotiated the Reciprocity Agreement of 1911. Paterson, along with the Government, was defeated on September 21, 1911 on the reciprocity issue. He then retired from active business and public life.

Paterson was deputy reeve of Brantford from 1869 to 1871 and mayor from 1872 to 1873.

On the occasion of his first election to Parliament Paterson's wife recorded on August 30, 1872: 'Grand Reform picnic in Burford where His Worship was presented with a token of regard in the shape of a walking stick – of curious workmanship and silver band with inscription: "Presented to William Paterson, Esq. Mayor of Brantford, on his Election as member of the House of Commons for South Riding of the County of Brant Ontario, on the 19th August 1872, by many friends."'

Family legend has it that the cane was carved by Smoke Johnson, elder of the Six Nations community south of Brantford. The election was only two weeks before the presentation so the cane was in existence before the election and had the silver band applied just prior to the Grand Reform picnic where the cane was presented.

== Archives ==
There are William Paterson fonds at Trent University and Library and Archives Canada.

== Electoral record ==
1872 Canadian federal election: Brant South
Party	Candidate	Votes
Liberal	William Paterson	1,378
Liberal–Conservative	Sir Francis Hincks	1,116
Source: Canadian Elections Database

1874 Canadian federal election: Brant South
Party	Candidate	Votes
Liberal	William Paterson	1,463
Unknown	Alfred Watts	1,019

1878 Canadian federal election: Brant South
Party	Candidate	Votes
Liberal	William Paterson	1,496
Unknown	Alfred Watts	1,298
Source: Canadian Elections Database

1882 Canadian federal election: Brant South
Party	Candidate	Votes
Liberal	William Paterson	1,473
Conservative	Alfred Watts	1,297

1887 Canadian federal election: Brant South
Party	Candidate	Votes
Liberal	William Paterson	2,230
Conservative	William Foster Cockshutt	1,656

1904 Canadian federal election: Brant
Party	Candidate	Votes	%
Liberal	William Paterson	1,628	58.4
Unknown	Adam George Ludlow	1,158	41.6
Total valid votes		2,786	100.0

1908 Canadian federal election: Brant
Party	Candidate	Votes	%	±%
Liberal	William Paterson	1,799	53.7	-4.8
Conservative	John Patrick Noonan	1,554	46.3	
Total valid votes		3,353	100.0	

1911 Canadian federal election: Brant
Party	Candidate	Votes	%	±%
Conservative	John Henry Fisher	1,795	51.9	+5.5
Liberal	William Paterson	1,666	48.1	-5.5
Total valid votes		3,461	100.0	
