= Joseph Henry Ham =

Canadian politician

Ontario MPP
- In office 1914–1919
- Preceded by: Willoughby Staples Brewster
- Succeeded by: M.M. MacBride
- Constituency: Brant South

Personal details
- Born: March 24, 1867 Brantford, Ontario
- Died: January 20, 1925 (aged 57) Brantford, Ontario
- Party: Liberal
- Spouse: Mary Dennis (m. 1897)
- Occupation: Businessman

Joseph Henry Ham (March 24, 1867 – January 20, 1925) was an Ontario manufacturer and political figure. He represented Brant North in the Legislative Assembly of Ontario from 1914 to 1919 as a Liberal member.

He was born in Brantford, Ontario, the son of W. Ham; his parents came to Canada from England. He served on Brantford City Council. In 1897, he married Mary Dennis. He died in Brantford in 1925.
