= Gavin Fleming =

Canadian politician

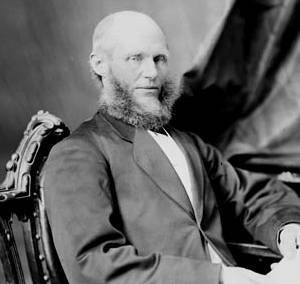

Member of the Canadian Parliament for Brant North
- In office 1872–1882
- Preceded by: John Young Bown
- Succeeded by: James Somerville

Personal details
- Born: June 5, 1826 near Falkirk, Scotland
- Died: May 17, 1890 (aged 63)
- Party: Liberal
- Profession: merchant

Gavin Fleming (June 5, 1826 – May 17, 1890) was a Canadian merchant and political figure. He represented Brant North in the House of Commons of Canada from 1872 to 1882 as a Liberal member.

Fleming was born near Falkirk, Stirlingshire, Scotland, the son of John Fleming and Margaret Dobbie, and was educated there. He moved to Canada in 1849; his parents had come to Upper Canada in 1831. Fleming was a merchant at Glenmorris until he retired from business in 1871 and served four years as treasurer for South Dumfries Township. In 1852, he married Margaret Laprairik. He was named a justice of the peace in 1863.

1872 Canadian federal election: Brant North
Party	Candidate	Votes
Liberal	Gavin Fleming	882
Unknown	H. A. Baird	571
Source: Canadian Elections Database

1874 Canadian federal election: Brant North
Party	Candidate	Votes
Liberal	Gavin Fleming	acclaimed
Source: Canadian Elections Database

1878 Canadian federal election: Brant North
Party	Candidate	Votes
Liberal	Gavin Fleming	931
Unknown	Crawford	734
Source: Canadian Elections Database
