= Joseph Demers (Quebec MP) =

Canadian politician

Marie Joseph Demers
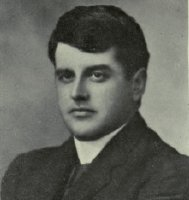

Member of the Canadian Parliament for St. Johns—Iberville
- In office 1906–1922
- Preceded by: Louis Philippe Demers
- Succeeded by: Aldéric-Joseph Benoit

Personal details
- Born: May 31, 1871 St-Georges d'Henryville, Quebec
- Died: July 28, 1940 (aged 69)
- Party: Liberal
- Relations: Alexis-Louis Demers, father Louis Philippe Demers, brother

Marie Joseph Demers (May 31, 1871 – July 28, 1940) was a Canadian politician.

Born in St-Georges d'Henryville, Quebec, the son of Alexis-Louis Demers, former M.L.A. for Iberville, and the brother of Louis Philippe Demers, who sat in the House of Commons of Canada from 1900 to 1906 until he was appointed a Puisne Judge, Superior Court. Demers was educated at the College of St. Hyacinthe and St. Mary's College, Montreal. A lawyer, he practised in DeLorimier, near Montreal. He was elected to the House of Commons for St. Johns—Iberville in the by-election called after his brother was appointed a judge. A Liberal, he was re-elected in 1908, 1911, 1917, and 1921. He resigned in 1922, when he accepted of an office of emolument under the Crown.
