= Louis Philippe Demers =

Canadian politician

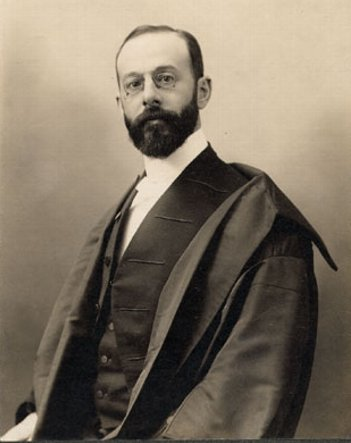

Member of the Canadian Parliament for St. Johns—Iberville
- In office 1900–1906
- Preceded by: Joseph Israël Tarte
- Succeeded by: Marie Joseph Demers

Personal details
- Born: September 16, 1863 St-Georges d'Henryville, Canada East
- Died: November 3, 1951 (aged 88)
- Relations: Alexis-Louis Demers, father Marie Joseph Demers, brother

Louis Philippe Demers (September 16, 1863 – November 3, 1951) was a Canadian lawyer, professor, and politician.

Born in St-Georges d'Henryville, Canada East, the son of Alexis-Louis Demers, a Quebec politician, and Marie Goyette. Demers was educated at the College of St. Hyacinthe, Quebec and Laval University, Montreal.

As a lawyer, he was the head of the firm of Demer and DeLorimier in Montreal. He was a Professor of Commercial Law at Laval University, Montreal. He was first elected to the House of Commons of Canada for the electoral district of St. Johns—Iberville in the general elections of 1900.

As a Liberal, he was re-elected in 1904. He resigned in 1906 when he was appointed Puisne Judge, Superior Court. His brother, Marie Joseph Demers, was elected to replace him.
