= Charles Bernhard Heyd =

Canadian politician

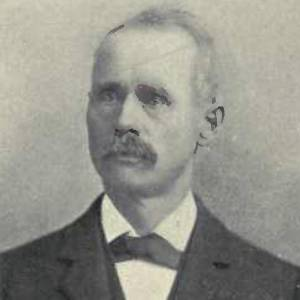
Charles Bernhard Heyd

Charles Bernhard Heyd (February 23, 1842 – September 16, 1929) was a Canadian parliamentarian, grocer and fiddler. The eldest son of Swiss immigrant Bernhard Heyd, Charles was born in Rochester, New York where his father worked as a carpenter before settling in Brantford, Canada West in 1854. His father worked for the railway for a year before establishing a grocery store.

As an adult, Charles B. Heyd was a Liberal-Reformer and served as an alderman on Brantford's council for five years. In 1865, he married Janet Davey, a native of Scotland. He was also a director for the Royal Loan and Savings Company and of the Brantford Young Ladies' College. Heyd served as mayor of Branford twice, in 1886 and 1888–89 and was elected to the House of Commons of Canada in an 1897 by-election as a Liberal representing Brant South and was re-elected in the 1900 federal election, defeating Robert Henry each time. The riding was merged into the new Brantford electoral district for the 1904 federal election in which Heyd was defeated by a margin of 15 votes.

== Electoral record ==
1887 Canadian federal election: Brant South
Party	Candidate	Votes
Liberal	William Paterson	2,230
Conservative	William Foster Cockshutt	1,656

1891 Canadian federal election: Brant South
Party	Candidate	Votes
Liberal	William Paterson	1,963
Unknown	Peter H. Cox	1,421
