= John Young Bown =

Canadian politician

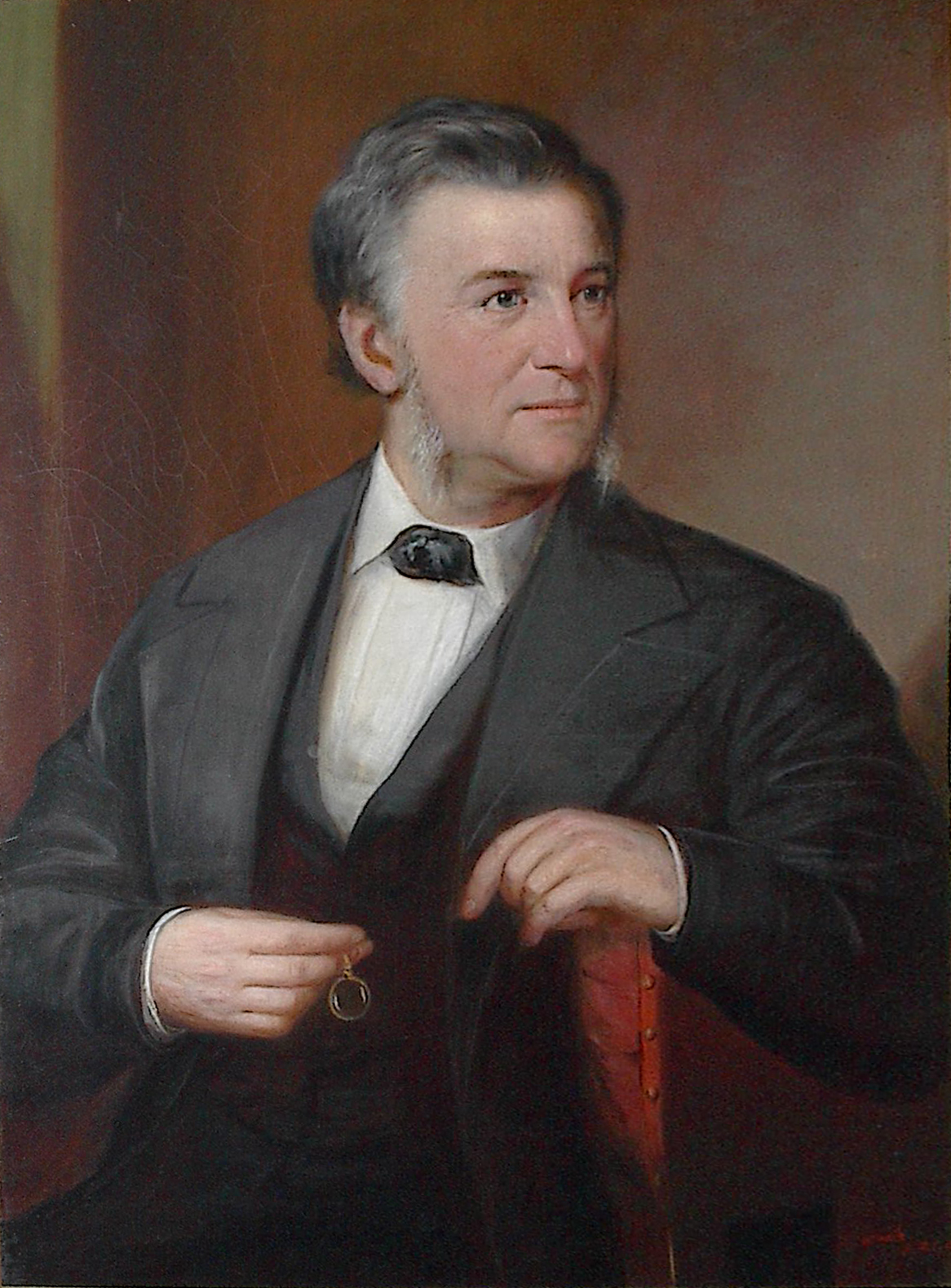
- John Young Bown, c. 1869

Member of the Canadian Parliament for Brant North
- In office 1867–1872
- Succeeded by: Gavin Fleming

Personal details
- Born: December 30, 1821 Dorsetshire, England
- Died: September 26, 1890 (aged 68) Brantford, Ontario, Canada
- Party: Liberal-Conservative
- Profession: physician

John Young Bown (December 30, 1821 – September 26, 1890) was a medical doctor and Canadian political figure. He was a member of the House of Commons of Canada from 1867 to 1872.

He was born in Dorsetshire, England, in 1821. He studied at the University of St Andrews and received a degree in medicine. He was a member of the Royal College of Surgeons of England. Bown set up practice in Brantford, Ontario. He married Rebecca Campbell.

He was elected to the 7th Parliament of the Province of Canada representing East Brant in 1861 and was re-elected in 1863. He represented Brant North as a Liberal-Conservative member in the 1st Canadian Parliament.

He died in Brantford in 1890.

1867 Canadian federal election: Brant North
Party	Candidate	Votes
Liberal–Conservative	John Young Bown	672
Liberal	Joseph Duffett Clement	670
Eligible voters		1,857
Source: Canadian Parliamentary Guide, 1871
