= Prince County (electoral district) =

Former federal electoral district in Prince Edward Island, Canada

Prince Edward Island electoral district

Defunct federal electoral district
- Legislature: House of Commons
- District created: 1873
- District abolished: 1892
- First contested: By-election 1873
- Last contested: 1891

Prince County was a federal electoral district in Prince Edward Island, Canada, that was represented in the House of Commons of Canada from 1873 to 1896. This riding was created in 1873 when Prince Edward island joined the Canadian Confederation. It was abolished in 1896 when it was redistributed into East Prince and West Prince ridings.

It consisted of Prince County, and elected two members.

== Election results ==
Canadian federal by-election, 29 September 1873
Party	Candidate	Votes	Elected	
Conservative	James Colledge Pope	acclaimed		X
Liberal	James Yeo	acclaimed		X
Called as a result of Prince Edward Island joining Confederation 1 July 1873

1874 Canadian federal election
Party	Candidate	Votes	Elected	
Liberal	James Yeo	2,188		X
Liberal	Stanislaus Francis Perry	1,804		X
Unknown	John Ramsay	669		
Unknown	F. McNeill	337		

1878 Canadian federal election
Party	Candidate	Votes	Elected	
Liberal	James Yeo	1,716		X
Liberal–Conservative	Edward Hackett	1,655		X
Unknown	C. Howatt	1,605		
Liberal	Stanislaus Francis Perry	1,491		

1882 Canadian federal election
Party	Candidate	Votes	Elected	
Liberal	James Yeo	2,388		X
Liberal–Conservative	Edward Hackett	2,325		X
Liberal	Stanislaus Francis Perry	2,178		
Unknown	D. Rogers	2,134		

1887 Canadian federal election
Party	Candidate	Votes	Elected	
Liberal	James Yeo	3,184		X
Liberal	Stanislaus Francis Perry	2,988		X
Liberal–Conservative	Edward Hackett	2,763		
Conservative	John Lefurgey	2,600		

1891 Canadian federal election
Party	Candidate	Votes	Elected	
Liberal	John Yeo	3,279		X
Liberal	Stanislaus Francis Perry	3,182		X
Conservative	George William Howlan	2,903		
Conservative	Richard Hunt	2,661		

== See also ==
- List of Canadian electoral districts
- Historical federal electoral districts of Canada
