= Richard Willis Jameson =

Canadian politician

Mayor Richard Willis Jameson
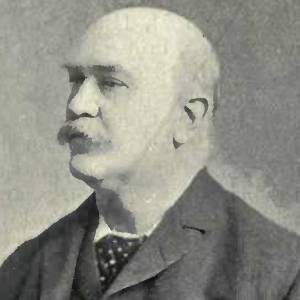

15th Mayor of Winnipeg
- In office 1896–1896

Member of Parliament for Winnipeg
- In office 27 April 1897 – 21 February 1899
- Preceded by: Hugh John Macdonald
- Succeeded by: Arthur Puttee

Personal details
- Born: 12 July 1851 Cape Town, Cape Colony
- Died: 21 February 1899 (aged 47) Winnipeg, Manitoba, Canada
- Spouse: Ann Elizabeth Thurman (m. 1 May 1881)

Richard Willis Jameson (12 July 1851 – 21 February 1899) was a Canadian politician who served as an alderman and 15th Mayor of Winnipeg, and as a Member of the House of Commons of Canada.

== Early life ==
Born in Cape Town, Jameson was educated in the United Kingdom. He graduated from Trinity College, Cambridge after attending King's College London. He moved to Canada in 1876, first practicing law in Toronto, and received his admission to the bar in Ontario the following year. He moved to Winnipeg in 1881 to conduct land speculation at a time when that city's economy enjoyed considerable growth. He was inducted into Manitoba's provincial bar in 1882.

Following terms as Winnipeg alderman starting in 1892, Jameson was elected the city's Mayor for 1896.

After the federal election results for the Winnipeg riding were annulled in March 1897, Jameson entered a by-election as a Liberal candidate. He won the riding on 27 April 1897 and served for a portion of the 8th Canadian Parliament. However, Jameson died from a self-inflicted gunshot wound on 21 February 1899 shortly after presenting a speech to the Winnipeg Board of Trade. An investigation concluded that his death was not suicidal but accidental in nature.

Winnipeg named Jamison Avenue [sic] in his honour.
