= Charles Jonas Thornton =

Canadian politician (1850–1932)

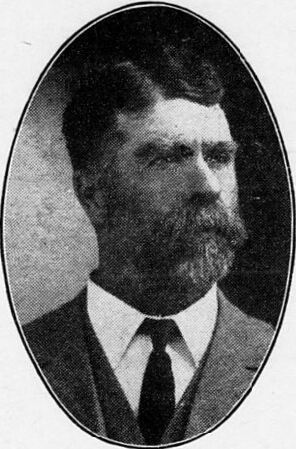
- Thornton, c. 1930s

Member of Parliament for Durham West
- In office 1900–1902
- Preceded by: Robert Beith
- Succeeded by: Robert Beith

Member of Parliament for Durham
- In office 1908–1917
- Preceded by: Henry Alfred Ward
- Succeeded by: Newton Rowell

Personal details
- Born: May 30, 1850 Clarke Township, Ontario, Canada
- Died: July 2, 1932 (aged 82) Orono, Ontario
- Party: Conservative Party
- Occupation: farmer

Charles Jonas Thornton (May 30, 1850 – July 2, 1932) was a political figure in Durham, Ontario.

He was born in Clarke Township, Ontario and was a farmer. He was elected to the township council and served on the body for seven years. He also served on Durham West county council for five years.

Thornton first ran for the House of Commons of Canada as a Patrons of Industry candidate in Durham West during the 1896 federal election but fared poorly coming in third place with less than 500 votes.

He was elected as the Conservative MP for Durham West in the 1900 federal election. His election was declared void in June 1901 and his seat declared vacant. A by-election was held in January 1902 in which his Liberal opponent defeated Thornton by 12 votes.

He returned to the House of Commons in the 1908 federal election, this time representing Durham, and was re-elected in the 1911 federal election. Thornton remained in parliament until the 1917 federal election in which he stepped aside so that the wartime Union Government which Conservative Prime Minister Sir Robert Borden had formed could run Liberal-Unionist Newton Rowell as a pro-Government candidate.

Thornton was a member of the Orange Order. He died in Orono, Ontario in 1932.

== Electoral record ==
1911 Canadian federal election: Durham
Party	Candidate	Votes	%	±%
Conservative	Charles Jonas Thornton	3,291	56.18	+1.12
Liberal	Thomas Alexander Kelly	2,567	43.82	-1.12

1908 Canadian federal election: Durham
Party	Candidate	Votes	%	±%
Conservative	Charles Jonas Thornton	3,387	55.06	+3.92
Liberal	David Burke Simpson	2,764	44.94	-3.92
