= Stanislaus Francis Perry =

Canadian politician

The Honourable Stanislaus Francis Perry
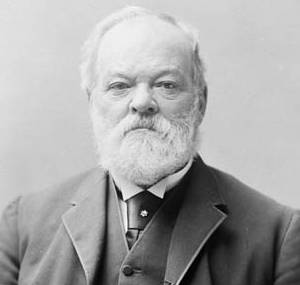
- Perry in July 1891

MP for West Prince
- In office April 27, 1897 – February 24, 1898
- Preceded by: James Colledge Pope
- Succeeded by: Edward Hackett

MP for Prince County
- In office January 22, 1874 – September 17, 1878
- Preceded by: James Colledge Pope
- Succeeded by: Edward Hackett

Member of the Legislative Assembly of Prince Edward Island for 1st Prince
- In office 1854–1875
- Preceded by: District established
- Succeeded by: Francis Gallant
- In office 1879–1887
- Preceded by: Nicholas Conroy
- Succeeded by: Vacant

Personal details
- Born: Stanislas-François Poirier; May 7, 1823 Tignish, Prince Edward Island
- Died: February 24, 1898 (aged 74) Ottawa, Ontario, Canada
- Party: Liberal
- Spouse: Margaret Carroll (m. 1847)
- Children: 10
- Occupation: Farmer
- Profession: Politician

Stanislaus Francis Perry (May 7, 1823 – February 24, 1898) was a Canadian farmer and politician in Prince Edward Island.

== Early life ==
He was born Stanislas-François Poirier in Tignish, Prince Edward Island, the son of Pierre Poirier and Marie-Blanche Gaudet. Poirier was educated in Tignish and then was educated in English at St. Andrew's College in Charlottetown. On his return to Tignish in 1843, he taught school. Poirier anglicized his name around this time. In 1847, he married Margaret Carroll. He was named a justice of the peace in 1851.

== Political career ==
In 1854, Perry left teaching, began farming to support his family and entered politics. As an Acadian, he supported the redistribution of land on the island from the landowners to the tenant farmers. In 1870, he supported a coalition conservative government because it supported grants to Catholic schools. Perry was speaker in the provincial assembly from 1873 to 1874. Perry was initially opposed to Confederation but ran unsuccessfully for a seat in the House of Commons in 1873 before being elected in 1874. He was also an unsuccessful federal candidate in 1878 and 1882. He was defeated in 1896 but won the subsequent by-election after the first election was declared invalid. Perry was a proponent of a tunnel to link the island to the mainland.

He represented 1st Prince in the Legislative Assembly of Prince Edward Island from 1854 to 1875 and from 1879 to 1887 and, in the House of Commons of Canada, represented Prince County from 1874 to 1878 and from 1887 to 1896 and West Prince from 1897 to 1898 as a Liberal member. Perry (Poirier) was the first Acadian to serve in both the provincial assembly and the House of Commons.

Perry helped organize the first and second Acadian national conventions in Memramcook, New Brunswick (1881) and Miscouche, Prince Edward Island (1884) although he boycotted the second event because he wanted the event to be held in Tignish.

== Death ==
He died in office in Ottawa in 1898 and was buried in Tignish.

== Personal life ==
He was the grandfather of Nova Scotia Premier Angus Lewis Macdonald and is a direct ancestor of current PEI MLA and PEI Opposition leader Hal Perry.

== Electoral record ==
1874 Canadian federal election: Prince County
Party	Candidate	Votes	Elected	
Liberal	James Yeo	2,188		X
Liberal	Stanislaus Francis Perry	1,804		X
Unknown	John Ramsay	669		
Unknown	F. McNeill	337		

1878 Canadian federal election: Prince County
Party	Candidate	Votes	Elected	
Liberal	James Yeo	1,716		X
Liberal–Conservative	Edward Hackett	1,655		X
Unknown	C. Howatt	1,605		
Liberal	Stanislaus Francis Perry	1,491		

1882 Canadian federal election: Prince County
Party	Candidate	Votes	Elected	
Liberal	James Yeo	2,388		X
Liberal–Conservative	Edward Hackett	2,325		X
Liberal	Stanislaus Francis Perry	2,178		
Unknown	D. Rogers	2,134		

1887 Canadian federal election: Prince County
Party	Candidate	Votes	Elected	
Liberal	James Yeo	3,184		X
Liberal	Stanislaus Francis Perry	2,988		X
Liberal–Conservative	Edward Hackett	2,763		
Conservative	John Lefurgey	2,600		

1891 Canadian federal election: Prince County
Party	Candidate	Votes	Elected	
Liberal	John Yeo	3,279		X
Liberal	Stanislaus Francis Perry	3,182		X
Conservative	George William Howlan	2,903		
Conservative	Richard Hunt	2,661		
