= SS Iberville =

SS Iberville may refer to one of three Type C2-S-E1 ships built by Gulf Shipbuilding for the United States Maritime Commission:

- SS Iberville (1942) (MC hull number 474), transferred to the United States Navy as the lead ship of her class of attack transports, USS Sumter (APA-52); sold for commercial use in 1947; converted to container ship in 1957; scrapped in 1978
- SS Iberville (1943) (MC hull number 481), transferred to the United States Navy as the lead ship of her class of stores ships, USS Hyades (AF-28); transferred to the National Defense Reserve Fleet in 1976; disposed of in 1983
- SS Iberville (1945) (MC hull number 1611), scrapped in 1972
