= François Béchard =

Canadian politician (1830–1897)

The Hon. François Béchard
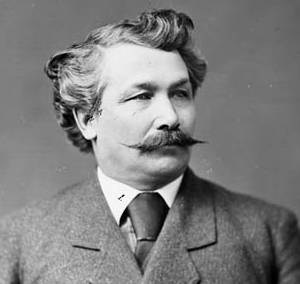

Senator for De Lorimier, Quebec
- In office 1896–1897
- Appointed by: Wilfrid Laurier
- Preceded by: Alphonse Desjardins
- Succeeded by: Raoul Dandurand

Member of the Canadian Parliament for Iberville
- In office 1867–1896
- Preceded by: District was created in 1867.
- Succeeded by: District was abolished in 1892.

Member of the Canadian Parliament for St. Johns—Iberville
- In office June 23, 1896 – July 17, 1896
- Preceded by: District was created in 1892.
- Succeeded by: Joseph Israël Tarte

Personal details
- Born: April 18, 1830 Mount Johnson, Lower Canada
- Died: April 13, 1897 (aged 66) Montreal, Quebec
- Party: Liberal

François Béchard (French pronunciation: [fʁɑ̃swa beʃaʁ]; April 18, 1830 – April 13, 1897) was a Quebec farmer and political figure. He represented Iberville and then St. Johns—Iberville in the House of Commons of Canada as a Liberal member from 1867 to 1896. He was a member of the Senate of Canada for De Lorimier division from 1896 to 1897.

He was born in Mount Johnson (now Mont-Saint-Grégoire), Lower Canada in 1830, the son of François Béchard and Clémence Gozette, and educated at the College of Saint-Hyacinthe. He served as a major in the local militia and was mayor of Saint-Grégoire. Béchard was named to the Senate in September 1896 and died in 1897 in Montreal while still in office.

== Elections ==
1867 Canadian federal election: Iberville
Party	Candidate	Votes	Elected
Liberal	François Béchard	1,035	✓
Unknown	Alexandre Dufresne	504	
Source: Canadian Elections Database

1872 Canadian federal election: Iberville
Party	Candidate	Votes
Liberal	François Béchard	acclaimed
Source: Canadian Elections Database

1874 Canadian federal election: Iberville
Party	Candidate	Votes
Liberal	François Béchard	acclaimed
Source: lop.parl.ca

1878 Canadian federal election: Iberville
Party	Candidate	Votes
Liberal	François Béchard	929
Unknown	Ch. Thibeault	700

1882 Canadian federal election: Iberville
Party	Candidate	Votes
Liberal	François Béchard	acclaimed

1887 Canadian federal election: Iberville
Party	Candidate	Votes
Liberal	François Béchard	acclaimed

1891 Canadian federal election: Iberville
Party	Candidate	Votes
Liberal	François Béchard	1,029
Conservative	Joseph A. Nadeau	545
