= West Prince =

Former federal electoral district in Prince Edward Island, Canada

Prince Edward Island electoral district

Defunct federal electoral district
- Legislature: House of Commons
- District created: 1892
- District abolished: 1903
- First contested: 1896
- Last contested: 1900

West Prince was a federal electoral district in Prince Edward Island, Canada, that was represented in the House of Commons of Canada from 1896 to 1904. This riding was created in 1892 from parts of Prince County ridings. It was abolished in 1903 when it was redistributed into Prince and Queen's ridings.

It consisted of the western part of Prince County.

== Election results ==
1896 Canadian federal election
Party	Candidate	Votes
Liberal–Conservative	HACKETT, Edward	1,593
Liberal	PERRY, S.F.	1,548
Liberal	YEO, John	321

By-election: On election being declared void, 24 March 1897

By-election on 27 April 1897
Party	Candidate	Votes
Liberal	PERRY, S.F.	1,614
Liberal–Conservative	HACKETT, Ed.	1,527

By-election: On Mr. Perry's death, 24 February 1898

By-election on 13 April 1898
Party	Candidate	Votes
Liberal	MCLELLAN, B.D.	1,828
Liberal–Conservative	HACKETT, Ed.	1,512

1900 Canadian federal election
Party	Candidate	Votes
Liberal–Conservative	HACKETT, Edward	1,854
Liberal	MCLELLAN, Bernard Donald	1,845

== See also ==
- List of Canadian electoral districts
- Historical federal electoral districts of Canada
