= James McMonies =

Canadian politician and businessman

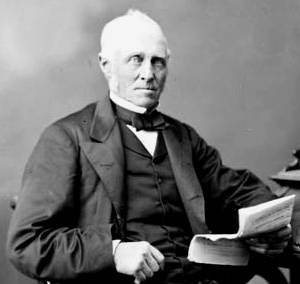
James McMonies Source: Library and Archives Canada

James McMonies (1800 – January 12, 1888) was an Ontario businessman and political figure. He represented Wentworth North in the 1st Canadian Parliament as a Liberal member.

He was born in Kirkcudbright, Scotland in 1800. McMonies owned a farm and operated a sawmill near the town of Waterdown. He also served as reeve of East Flamborough. McMonies represented the North riding of Wentworth in the Legislative Assembly of the Province of Canada from 1865 to Confederation, being elected in a by-election held following the death of William Notman. In 1865, he was named clerk in the 3rd Division Court, Wentworth County. He died in Waterdown at the age of 88.

1867 Canadian federal election: Wentworth North
Party	Candidate	Votes	%	±%
Liberal	James McMonies	1,154		
Unknown	Alexander Brown	1,093		
