= St. Johns—Iberville—Napierville =

Former federal electoral district in Quebec, Canada

Quebec electoral district

Defunct federal electoral district
- Legislature: House of Commons
- District created: 1933
- District abolished: 1947
- First contested: 1935
- Last contested: 1945

St. Johns—Iberville—Napierville was a federal electoral district in Quebec, Canada, that was represented in the House of Commons of Canada from 1935 to 1949.

This riding was created in 1933 from Laprairie—Napierville and St. Johns—Iberville ridings. It was abolished in 1947 when it was replaced by Saint-Jean—Iberville—Napierville riding.

It consisted of:

- the county of St. Johns excluding the municipality of Notre-Dame du-Mont-Carmel, St-Bernard-de-Lacolle and the village of Lacolle;
- the county of Iberville;
- the county of Napierville.

== Members of Parliament ==
This riding elected the following members of Parliament:

Parliament	Years	Member	Party
St. Johns—Iberville—Napierville; Riding created from Laprairie—Napierville and St. Johns—Iberville
18th	1935–1940	Martial Rhéaume	Liberal
19th	1940–1945	Martial Rhéaume	Liberal
20th	1945–1949	Alcide Côté	Liberal
Riding dissolved into Saint-Jean—Iberville—Napierville

== Election results ==
1935 Canadian federal election
Party	Candidate	Votes
Liberal	Martial Rhéaume	9,422
Conservative	Hector Rémillard	1,359

1940 Canadian federal election
Party	Candidate	Votes
Liberal	Martial Rhéaume	7,439
Independent Liberal	Charles-Georges St-Germain	6,307
National Government	Alexandre-E. Grégoire	2,331

1945 Canadian federal election
Party	Candidate	Votes
Liberal	Alcide Côté	10,866
Bloc populaire	Gustave Signori	3,256
Independent	Alexandre-Émilien Grégoire	1,369
Independent Liberal	Louis-E. Martel	1,250

== See also ==
- List of Canadian electoral districts
- Historical federal electoral districts of Canada
