= Martial Rhéaume =

Canadian politician

Member of Parliament for St. Johns—Iberville
- In office July 1930 – October 1935
- Preceded by: Aldéric-Joseph Benoît
- Succeeded by: riding dissolved

Member of Parliament for St. Johns—Iberville—Napierville
- In office October 1935 – June 1945
- Preceded by: riding created
- Succeeded by: Alcide Côté

Personal details
- Born: Pierre Auguste Martial Rhéaume; 9 April 1882 unknown
- Died: 17 December 1970 (aged 88) St. Jean, Quebec, Canada
- Party: Liberal
- Spouse: m. 2 May 1904
- Profession: butcher and meat cutter

Pierre Auguste Martial Rhéaume (9 April 1882 – 17 December 1970) was a Liberal member of the House of Commons of Canada. He was a butcher and meat cutter by trade.

Rhéaume was a municipal councillor in Saint-Jean-sur-Richelieu, Quebec for 16 years, and the community's mayor for five years.

He was first elected to Parliament at the St. Johns—Iberville riding in the 1930 federal election. He campaigned unsuccessfully as an Independent Liberal candidate in 1926. Rhéaume was re-elected to Parliament in 1935 when his riding became known as St. Johns—Iberville—Napierville. After another re-election there in 1940, Rhéaume did not seek re-election in 1945. As the riding became known as Saint-Jean—Iberville—Napierville, Rhéaume's Parliamentary comeback bid as an independent candidate was unsuccessful in the 1949 election, as Alcide Côté of the Liberal party was re-elected in that riding.
