= Robert Beith =

Canadian politician (1843–1922)

The Honourable Robert Beith
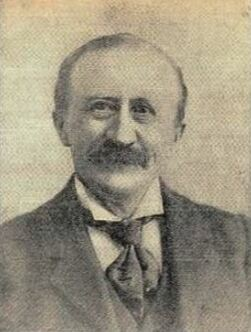
- Beith, c. 1905

Canadian Senator from Ontario
- In office January 15, 1907 – January 22, 1922
- Nominated by: Wilfrid Laurier
- Appointed by: Albert Grey, 4th Earl Grey

Member of Parliament for Durham West
- In office March 5, 1891 – November 7, 1900
- Preceded by: Edward Blake
- Succeeded by: Charles Jonas Thornton
- In office January 15, 1902 – November 2, 1904
- Preceded by: Charles Jonas Thornton
- Succeeded by: Henry Alfred Ward

Personal details
- Born: May 17, 1843 Darlington Township, Canada West
- Died: January 26, 1922 (aged 78)
- Party: Liberal
- Occupation: Politician; farmer

Robert Beith (May 17, 1843, in Darlington Township, Canada West – January 26, 1922) was a Canadian politician and farmer. He was elected to the House of Commons of Canada as a Member of the Liberal Party in 1891 to represent the riding of Durham West. He was re-elected in 1896 then lost in 1900 but re-elected in 1902 after the previous election was declared void on October 6, 1901. He was appointed to the senate of Canada by Sir Wilfrid Laurier on January 15, 1907, to represent the senate division of Bowmanville, Ontario. In Bowmanville, Beith was the owner of Waverley Stables and Stock Farm located on present day Waverley Road.
