= Arthur Sturgis Hardy =

Canadian lawyer and politician

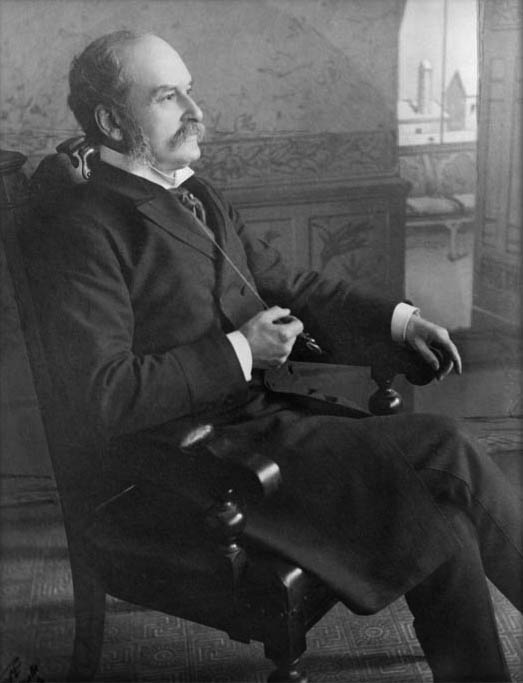
- Arthur Sturgis Hardy, c. 1900

4th Premier of Ontario
- In office July 21, 1896 – October 21, 1899
- Monarch: Victoria
- Lieutenant Governor: George Airey Kirkpatrick; Casimir Gzowski (acting); Oliver Mowat
- Preceded by: Oliver Mowat
- Succeeded by: George William Ross

Ontario MPP
- In office 1873–1899
- Preceded by: Edmund Burke Wood
- Succeeded by: Thomas Hiram Preston
- Constituency: Brant South

Leader of the Ontario Liberal Party
- In office 1896–1899
- Preceded by: Oliver Mowat
- Succeeded by: George William Ross

Personal details
- Born: December 14, 1837 Mount Pleasant, Upper Canada
- Died: June 13, 1901 (aged 63) Toronto, Ontario
- Resting place: Greenwood Cemetery (original); Farringdon Burial Ground (current)
- Party: Liberal
- Spouse: Mary Morrison

Arthur Sturgis Hardy, QC (December 14, 1837 – June 13, 1901) was a Canadian lawyer and Liberal politician who served as the fourth premier of Ontario from 1896 to 1899.

== Early life ==
Born in Mount Pleasant, Brant County, in 1837, Hardy was the son of Russell and Juletta (Sturgis) Hardy, United Empire Loyalists. He studied at the Rockwood Academy in Rockwood, Province of Canada, and he became town solicitor for Brantford in 1867, a bencher of the Law Society of Upper Canada in 1875, and a QC in 1876. On January 19, 1870, he married Mary Morrison, daughter of Judge Joseph Curran Morrison.

== Political career ==
First elected to the Legislative Assembly of Ontario in 1873, he was promoted to the Cabinet of Sir Oliver Mowat in 1877 as Provincial Secretary. In 1889, as Commissioner of Crown Lands, Hardy established the Algonquin and Rondeau provincial parks. Well known for his support of Mowat's liberalism, he was described in Grip as a hard-nosed and down-to-earth politician in Mowat's service:

The more wickeder he is, playing euchre and swearing and entertaining thirsty strangers, the brighter does the virtue of Mowat shine by contrast.

Entering his sixties and having been in government for over twenty years, Hardy lacked the energy and strength to take the government forward or excite the populace when he succeeded Mowat as both Premier and Attorney-General in 1896. Initially reluctant to accept the positions, he said:

you know how very difficult it is in this wicked world to let high honours pass.

Aware of his weakness, he relied heavily on his minister of education, George William Ross.

Because there were Liberal governments in both Ottawa and Ontario, Hardy was urged to reassure French-speaking Catholics' concerns over the Manitoba Schools Question by appointing François-Eugène-Alfred Évanturel as Speaker of the Legislative Assembly. In the 1898 election, Hardy's government was returned with a narrow six seat majority due to the collapse of the agrarian Patrons of Industry party which had served as the Liberal's allies in the legislature, as well as the rise of Catholic and urban support for the Conservatives under James Pliny Whitney.

Hardy's most significant—and controversial—achievement occurred in 1898 with passage of an Act providing for all pine cut under licence on crown lands to be sawn into lumber in Canada. Michigan lumbermen sought to have the amendment disallowed for encroaching on the federal trade and commerce power, but Wilfrid Laurier's government refused to do so.

Exhausted and needing money, Hardy retired from politics in 1899 and died two years later from appendicitis. Hardy's body was originally interred at Greenwood Cemetery, however 34 years after his death, his son Senator Arthur Charles Hardy had the remains of Hardy, his wife, and their daughter Gladys Mary Starr moved to Farringdon Burial Ground.

== Legacy ==
An Ontario Historical Plaque was erected in Brantford, Ontario, by the province to commemorate Hardy's role in Ontario's history. On June 25, 2009, a new plaque was unveiled to commemorate Hardy under the initiative of Premiers' Gravesites Program. Local politicians, guests and family members paid tribute to the former politician. The family included his great-great-great-granddaughter and the children of his great-nephew Hagood Hardy.

== Electoral history ==
Ontario provincial by-election, May 1873: Brant South Resignation of Edmund Burke Wood
Party	Candidate	Votes	%	±%
Liberal	Arthur Sturgis Hardy	1,288	53.76	+6.45
Independent	J.J. Hawkins	1,108	46.24	
Total valid votes		2,396	100.0	+7.73
Liberal gain from Conservative		Swing		+6.45
Source: History of the Electoral Districts, Legislatures and Ministries of the Province of Ontario

1875 Ontario general election: Brant South
Party	Candidate	Votes
Liberal	Arthur Sturgis Hardy	Acclaimed
Source: Elections Ontario

Ontario provincial by-election, March 1877: Brant South Ministerial by-election
Party	Candidate	Votes
Liberal	Arthur Sturgis Hardy	Acclaimed
Source: History of the Electoral Districts, Legislatures and Ministries of the Province of Ontario

1879 Ontario general election: Brant South
Party	Candidate	Votes	%
Liberal	Arthur Sturgis Hardy	1,622	56.87
Conservative	Mr. Wilson	1,230	43.13
Total valid votes		2,852	60.93
Eligible voters		4,681	
Liberal hold			
Source: Elections Ontario
