= Morrison Mann MacBride =

Canadian politician

M.M. MacBride

Ontario MPP
- In office 1934–1938
- Preceded by: William George Martin
- Succeeded by: Louis Hagey
- Constituency: Brantford
- In office 1919–1926
- Preceded by: Joseph Henry Ham
- Succeeded by: Riding abolished
- Constituency: Brant South

Personal details
- Born: Morrison Mann MacBride; August 20, 1877 White Lake, Ontario
- Died: June 5, 1938 (aged 60) Brantford, Ontario
- Party: Labour (1919-1926); Independent (1934-1937); Liberal (1937-1938)
- Spouse: Louisa Elizabeth Hoff (m. 1899)
- Relations: John Ferguson (nephew)
- Occupation: Writer, printer

Morrison Mann MacBride (August 20, 1877 – June 5, 1938) was a politician in Ontario, Canada. He was a member of the Legislative Assembly of Ontario who represented the riding of Brant South from 1919 to 1926 and the riding of Brantford from 1934 to 1938. He served in the cabinet of Mitchell Hepburn. He entered politics as a member of the Labour party. From 1934 to 1937 he served as an Independent and from 1937 to 1938 he was a member of the Liberal party.

== Background ==
Born in White Lake, Ontario in 1877 to Archibald MacBride and Janet Strang. MacBride was educated nearby in Arnprior. He was the nephew of John Ferguson, who represented Renfrew South from 1887 to 1900, and was also related to Richard McBride, a former Premier of British Columbia.

He was married to Louisa Elizabeth Hoff in 1899. He learned the printing trade and reported for the Ottawa Free Press.

In 1900, MacBride went to Brantford to play with its lacrosse team until 1903. From 1904 to 1905, he worked in the composing room of the Winnipeg Free Press, and in 1908 he returned to Brantford to set up a printing company there.

MacBride was also a poet (in a style similar to that of Edgar Guest), having published many poems over the years through various media, and his works were collated and published in several volumes after his death.

== Politics ==
MacBride was elected as an alderman in Brantford in 1917 and went on to become mayor four separate times, from 1918 to 1920, in 1925, from 1933 to 1934 and from 1936 to 1937. Always active in pursuing economic opportunities for his city, he once met Herbert Fisk Johnson, Sr. on a train, and convinced him to set up the Canadian head office of S. C. Johnson & Son in Brantford.

He represented Brant South in the Legislative Assembly of Ontario from 1919 to 1926 as a Labour member. MacBride broke with the United Farmers of Ontario-Independent Labour Party coalition that took power following the election after the Labour contingent voted to nominate Walter Rollo rather than MacBride for the position of Minister of Labour. MacBride, however, argued that his departure from the caucus was due to its acquiescence to the United Farmers in the selection of cabinet members. MacBride remained a Labour MLA but sat in the Opposition benches and ran for re-election as a Conservative-Labour candidate in 1923. After his second term in the legislature ended in 1926, he did not run for re-election and was appointed Supervisor of Highways by the Conservative provincial government of Howard Ferguson.

He returned to the legislature in the 1934 provincial election, representing Brantford from 1934 to 1938 as an Independent Liberal member. He served as Minister of Labour in the provincial cabinet from 1937 to 1938. He died in Brantford in 1938, while still in office.

=== Cabinet positions ===
Hepburn ministry, Province of Ontario (1934–1942)
Cabinet post (1)
Predecessor	Office	Successor
Peter Heenan	Minister of Labour; 1937-1938	Norman Hipel
