= Edward Hackett =

Canadian politician

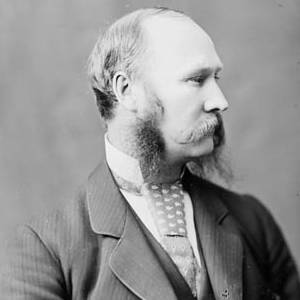

Member of the House of Commons of Canada for West Prince
- In office: 1896–1897; 1900–1904

Member of the House of Commons of Canada for Prince County

Member of Parliament for West Prince
- In office 1878–1887

Member of the Legislative Assembly of Prince Edward Island for 1st Prince
- In office 1876–1878

Personal details
- Born: 6 July 1840 Tignish, Prince Edward Island, Canada
- Died: 23 December 1916 (aged 76)
- Political party: Liberal-Conservative

Edward Hackett (6 July 1840 – 23 December 1916) was a merchant and political figure in Prince Edward Island. He represented 1st Prince in the Legislative Assembly of Prince Edward Island from 1876 to 1878. He subsequently served in the House of Commons of Canada, representing Prince County from 1878 to 1887, and West Prince from 1896 to 1897 and from 1900 to 1904. He was a Liberal-Conservative member.

He was born in Tignish, Prince Edward Island, the son of Thomas Hackett and Ellen Condon, immigrants from Ireland. He was first employed as a bookkeeper for a store before opening his own business in 1864, also entering the fish trade. In 1860, he married Hannah Maria Fitzgibbon. He served as justice of the peace for Prince County from 1872 to 1876. Hackett was defeated in bids for reelection to the House of Commons in 1887, 1897 and 1898.

1878 Canadian federal election: Prince County
Party	Candidate	Votes	Elected	
Liberal	James Yeo	1,716		X
Liberal–Conservative	Edward Hackett	1,655		X
Unknown	C. Howatt	1,605		
Liberal	Stanislaus Francis Perry	1,491		

1882 Canadian federal election: Prince County
Party	Candidate	Votes	Elected	
Liberal	James Yeo	2,388		X
Liberal–Conservative	Edward Hackett	2,325		X
Liberal	Stanislaus Francis Perry	2,178		
Unknown	D. Rogers	2,134		

1887 Canadian federal election: Prince County
Party	Candidate	Votes	Elected	
Liberal	James Yeo	3,184		X
Liberal	Stanislaus Francis Perry	2,988		X
Liberal–Conservative	Edward Hackett	2,763		
Conservative	John Lefurgey	2,600		
