= George Tate Blackstock =

Canadian lawyer

George Tate Blackstock (1 April 1856 – 27 December 1921) was a lawyer born in Newcastle, Canada West.

Blackstock was a leading civil and criminal lawyer in Toronto. He handled many prominent cases, both as a defence lawyer and as a Crown prosecutor.
