= Wentworth North and Brant =

Former federal electoral district in Ontario, Canada

Wentworth North and Brant was a federal electoral district represented in the House of Commons of Canada from 1892 to 1904. It was located west of the city of Hamilton in the province of Ontario.

It was created from parts of Wentworth North and Brant North ridings in 1892, and consisted of the townships of Ancaster, Blenheim, East Brantford, South Dumfries and Beverley.

The electoral district was abolished in 1903 when it was redistributed between Brant and Wentworth ridings.

== Electoral history ==
1896 Canadian federal election: Wentworth North and Brant
Party	Candidate	Votes	%	±%
Liberal	SOMERVILLE, Jas.	1,824		
Conservative	MUMA, Chas. C.	703		

1900 Canadian federal election: Wentworth North and Brant
Party	Candidate	Votes	%	±%
Liberal	PATERSON, Hon. William	2,059		
Conservative	JONES, S. Alfred	961		

== See also ==
- List of Canadian electoral districts
- Historical federal electoral districts of Canada
