= Thomas Hiram Preston =

Canadian politician (1855–1925)

Ontario MPP
- In office 1899–1908
- Preceded by: Arthur Sturgis Hardy
- Succeeded by: Willoughby Staples Brewster
- Constituency: Brant South

Personal details
- Born: October 22, 1855 Mount Vernon, Indiana
- Died: November 7, 1925 (aged 70) Brantford, Ontario
- Party: Liberal
- Spouse: Lillian Macdonald (m. 1876)
- Occupation: Journalist

Thomas Hiram Preston (October 22, 1855 – November 7, 1925) was an Ontario journalist and political figure. He represented Brant South in the Legislative Assembly of Ontario as a Liberal member from 1899 to 1908.

Preston was born in Mount Vernon, Indiana, the son of Reverend James Preston who had come to the United States from Lancashire. Preston apprenticed with the Woodstock Sentinel and then worked as a compositor at the Globe in Toronto. In 1876, he married Lillian Macdonald. He worked as a reporter in the United States and then returned to work at the Ottawa Free Press, becoming a member of the press gallery in Ottawa. He worked as night editor at the Globe and then was managing director at the Winnipeg Sun from 1882 to 1890. In 1890, he became the owner of the Brantford Expositor. Preston served as the first president of the Manitoba Press Association and was president of the Canadian Press Association from 1894 to 1895. He was first elected in an 1899 by-election held after Arthur Sturgis Hardy retired. Preston later served as a member of the Ontario Parole Board. He died in Brantford, Ontario. He is buried in the Farringdon Burial Ground in Brantford.
