= St. Johns—Iberville =

Former federal electoral district in Quebec, Canada

Quebec electoral district

Defunct federal electoral district
- Legislature: House of Commons
- District created: 1892
- District abolished: 1933
- First contested: 1896
- Last contested: 1930

St. Johns—Iberville (French: Saint-Jean—Iberville, pronounced [sɛ̃ ʒɑ̃ ibɛʁvil]) was a federal electoral district in Quebec, Canada, that was represented in the House of Commons of Canada from 1896 to 1935.

This riding was created in 1892 from Iberville and St. John's ridings. It consisted of the towns of St. John's and Iberville, and the parishes of St. Jean L'Evangéliste, St. Luc, Ste. Marguerite de Blairfindie (L'Acadie), St. Alexandre, Ste. Anne de Sabrevois, St. Athanase, Ste. Brigide, St. George de Henriville, St. Grégoire le Grand, St. Sébastien, St. Valentin, Notre-Dame de Stanbridge and Notre-Dame des Anges de Stanbridge, together with the islands situated in the river Richelieu opposite the parishes forming part of the said electoral district. In 1903, the parish of Lacolle and the islands in the river Richelieu opposite were transferred from the electoral district of Missisquoi to the electoral district of St. John's and Iberville.

In 1924, it was defined to consist of the counties of St. Johns and Iberville, including the city of St. Johns.

It was abolished in 1933 when it was redistributed into Châteauguay—Huntingdon and St. Johns—Iberville—Napierville ridings.

== Members of Parliament ==
This riding elected the following members of Parliament:

Parliament	Years	Member	Party
St. Johns—Iberville; Riding created from Iberville and St. John's
8th	1896–1896	François Béchard	Liberal
8th	1896–1900	Joseph-Israël Tarte	Liberal
9th	1900–1904	Louis Philippe Demers	Liberal
10th	1904–1906	Louis Philippe Demers	Liberal
10th	1906–1908	Joseph Demers	Liberal
11th	1908–1911	Joseph Demers	Liberal
12th	1911–1917	Joseph Demers	Liberal
13th	1917–1921	Joseph Demers	Opposition (Laurier Liberals)
14th	1921–1922	Joseph Demers	Liberal
14th	1922–1925	Aldéric-Joseph Benoit	Liberal
15th	1925–1926	Aldéric-Joseph Benoit	Liberal
16th	1926–1930	Aldéric-Joseph Benoit	Liberal
17th	1930–1935	Martial Rhéaume	Liberal
Riding dissolved into St. Johns—Iberville—Napierville and Châteauguay—Huntingdon

== Election results ==
1896 Canadian federal election
Party	Candidate	Votes
Liberal	François Béchard	1,849
Conservative	P. H. Roy	1,342

By-election On Mr. Béchard being summoned to the Senate, 17 July 1896

By-election on 3 August 1896
Party	Candidate	Votes
Liberal	Joseph-Israël Tarte	acclaimed

1900 Canadian federal election
Party	Candidate	Votes
Liberal	Louis Philippe Demers	2,024
Conservative	J. A. Nadeau	1,019

1904 Canadian federal election
Party	Candidate	Votes
Liberal	Louis Philippe Demers	2,363
Conservative	Joseph Lavoie	614

By-election On Mr. Demers being appointed Puisne Judge, Superior Court of Quebec, 31 August 1906

By-election on 16 October 1906
Party	Candidate	Votes
Liberal	Joseph Demers	acclaimed

1908 Canadian federal election
Party	Candidate	Votes
Liberal	Joseph Demers	2,415
Conservative	Pascal-Horace Lindsay	131

1911 Canadian federal election
Party	Candidate	Votes
Liberal	Joseph Demers	2,638
Conservative	Joseph-Edmond Lareau	729

1917 Canadian federal election
Party	Candidate	Votes
Opposition (Laurier Liberals)	Joseph Demers	4,271
Government (Unionist)	Pierre-Julien Doré	363

1921 Canadian federal election
Party	Candidate	Votes
Liberal	Joseph Demers	6,618
Conservative	Victor Mailloux	460

By-election On Mr. Demer's acceptance of an office of emolument under the Crown, 22 July 1922

By-election on 31 August 1922
Party	Candidate	Votes
Liberal	Aldéric-Joseph Benoit	5,629
Liberal	Stanislas Poulin	3,078

1925 Canadian federal election
Party	Candidate	Votes
Liberal	Aldéric-Joseph Benoit	4,074
Independent Liberal	Pacifique Gagnon	1,387

1926 Canadian federal election
Party	Candidate	Votes
Liberal	Aldéric-Joseph Benoit	4,802
Independent	Martial Rhéaume	4,006
Conservative	Herman Julien	328

1930 Canadian federal election
Party	Candidate	Votes
Liberal	Martial Rhéaume	7,958
Conservative	Yvan Sabourin	4,018

== See also ==
- List of Canadian electoral districts
- Historical federal electoral districts of Canada
