= Willoughby Staples Brewster =

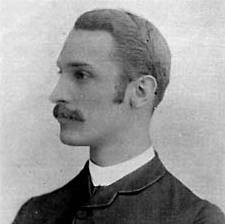

Ontario MPP
- In office 1908–1914
- Preceded by: Thomas Hiram Preston
- Succeeded by: Joseph Henry Ham
- Constituency: Brant South

Personal details
- Born: July 9, 1860 Haldimand Township, Northumberland County, Canada West
- Died: December 28, 1932 (aged 72) Brantford, Ontario
- Party: Conservative
- Spouse(s): Mary L. Horning (m. 1887–1896); Belle Roberts (m. 1898)
- Occupation: Lawyer

Willoughby Staples Brewster (July 9, 1860 – December 28, 1932) was an Ontario lawyer and political figure. He represented Brant South in the Legislative Assembly of Ontario from 1908 to 1914 as a Conservative member.

He was born in Haldimand Township, Northumberland County, Canada West, the son of John Brewster, and was educated at Victoria College in Cobourg. He articled in law in Brantford and set up practice there. In 1887, he married Mary L. Horning. In 1898, he married Belle Roberts after the death of his first wife. Brewster served on the town council and the public school board. He was also president of the Brantford Chamber of Commerce. Brewster ran unsuccessfully for a seat in the provincial assembly in 1905. During his time in the assembly, he played an important role in the passing of the Ontario Workmen's Compensation Act. One of his children, Harold Staples Brewster (1893–1916) was attending Osgood Hall Law School when he joined the Royal Air Corp in May 1915. He died in Europe the following year on 6 Dec 1916. Willoughby died in Brantford in 1932.
