= James Somerville (Wentworth County, Ontario politician) =

Canadian politician

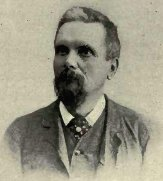

Member of the Canadian Parliament for Brant North
- In office 1882–1896
- Preceded by: Gavin Fleming
- Succeeded by: District was abolished in 1892

Member of the Canadian Parliament for Wentworth North and Brant
- In office 1896–1900
- Preceded by: District was created in 1892
- Succeeded by: William Paterson

Personal details
- Born: June 7, 1834 Dundas, Upper Canada
- Died: May 24, 1916 (aged 81) Dundas, Ontario
- Party: Liberal

James Somerville (June 7, 1834 – May 24, 1916) was an Ontario journalist, newspaper editor and political figure. He was a Liberal member of the House of Commons of Canada who represented Brant North from 1882 to 1896 and Wentworth North and Brant from 1896 to 1900.

He was born in Dundas, Upper Canada in 1834 and educated there and in Simcoe. In 1854, he became editor and owner of the Ayr Observer. In 1858, he returned to Dundas, where he established the True Banner. In the same year, he married Jeanette Rogers. Somerville served as mayor of Dundas in 1874 and was warden for Wentworth County.

He died in Dundas in 1916.

== Electoral record ==
1882 Canadian federal election: Brant North
Party	Candidate	Votes
Liberal	James Somerville	1,603
Conservative	James R. Currey	652

1887 Canadian federal election: Brant North
Party	Candidate	Votes
Liberal	James Somerville	1,660
Conservative	J.R. Curry	496

1891 Canadian federal election: Brant North
Party	Candidate	Votes
Liberal	James Somerville	1,729
Conservative	R.L. Hamilton	613
