= Wentworth North (federal electoral district) =

Former federal electoral district in Ontario, Canada

Wentworth North was a federal electoral district represented in the House of Commons of Canada from 6 August 1867 to 23 April 1896. It was located near the city of Hamilton in the province of Ontario. It was created by the British North America Act 1867. The "North Riding of Wentworth" consisted of the Townships of Beverley, Flamborough East and Flamborough West, and the Town of Dundas.

The electoral district was abolished in 1892 when it was merged into Wentworth North and Brant riding.

== Members of Parliament ==
This riding has elected the following members of Parliament:

Parliament	Years	Member	Party
1st	1867–1872	James McMonies	Liberal
2nd	1872–1874	Thomas Bain	Liberal
3rd	1874–1878	Thomas Bain	Liberal
4th	1878–1882	Thomas Bain	Liberal
5th	1882–1887	Thomas Bain	Liberal
6th	1887–1891	Thomas Bain	Liberal
7th	1891–1896	Thomas Bain	Liberal
Riding dissolved into Wentworth North and Brant

== Electoral history ==
1867 Canadian federal election
Party	Candidate	Votes	%	±%
Liberal	James McMonies	1,154		
Unknown	Alexander Brown	1,093		

1872 Canadian federal election
Party	Candidate	Votes	%	±%
Liberal	Thomas Bain	1,145		
Unknown	R. McKechnie	1,040		

1874 Canadian federal election
Party	Candidate	Votes	%	±%
Liberal	Thomas Bain	acclaimed		
Source: lop.parl.ca

1878 Canadian federal election
Party	Candidate	Votes	%	±%
Liberal	Thomas Bain	1,343		
Unknown	Thos. Stock	1,237		

1882 Canadian federal election
Party	Candidate	Votes	%	±%
Liberal	Thomas Bain	1,295		
Unknown	Robt. McKechnie Jr.	1,292		

1887 Canadian federal election
Party	Candidate	Votes	%	±%
Liberal	Thomas Bain	1,639		
Conservative	T.B. Townsend	1,513		

1891 Canadian federal election
Party	Candidate	Votes	%	±%
Liberal	Thomas Bain	1,517		
Conservative	Alex R. Wardell	1,317		

== See also ==
- List of Canadian electoral districts
- Historical federal electoral districts of Canada
