= John Clark (Canadian politician) =

Canadian politician

John Clark (1835 – July 27, 1896) was a Scottish-born farmer and political figure in Ontario, Canada. He was elected to represent Grey North in the House of Commons of Canada in 1896 as a Liberal, but died before the opening of the first session.

== Early life and career ==
He was born in Aberdeenshire. Clark married Jane Menzies. He was reeve of Keppel Township from 1891 to 1895 and had been deputy reeve from 1880 to 1890. He was warden for Grey County in 1888. Clark ran unsuccessfully for the Grey East seat in the House of Commons in 1891. He died of typhoid fever and peritonitis in 1896.
