= John Yeo =

Canadian politician

The Hon. John Yeo

John Yeo (29 June 1837 – 14 December 1924) was a Canadian farmer, ship builder and parliamentarian.

Yeo was born in Port Hill, Prince Edward Island, the son of James Yeo and Damaris Sargent, and educated in England. He was first elected to the Legislative Assembly of Prince Edward Island representing the district of 2nd Prince in 1859. A Conservative, he was re-elected in 1863, 1867, 1871, 1873, 1876, 1879, 1882, and 1886. In the 1890 election, he was elected as a Liberal. Yeo was the speaker for the assembly in 1871, served in the Executive Council from 1873 to 1879 as a minister without portfolio and was opposition leader from 1889 to 1890. He resigned in 1891 to run for federal office and was elected to represent Prince County as a Liberal.

Yeo was elected to the House of Commons of Canada representing the Prince Edward Island riding of East Prince in the Canadian federal election of 1896. He was appointed to the Senate of Canada on November 19, 1898, on the recommendation of Sir Wilfrid Laurier and served in that capacity until his death.

Yeo served as Grand Master of the Freemasons for Prince Edward Island. He lived in Port Hill and died there at the age of 90.

Parliament of Canada
Preceded by The electoral district was created in 1892.	Member of Parliament from East Prince; 1896–1898	Succeeded by John Howatt Bell
