= Durham West =

Former federal electoral district in Ontario, Canada

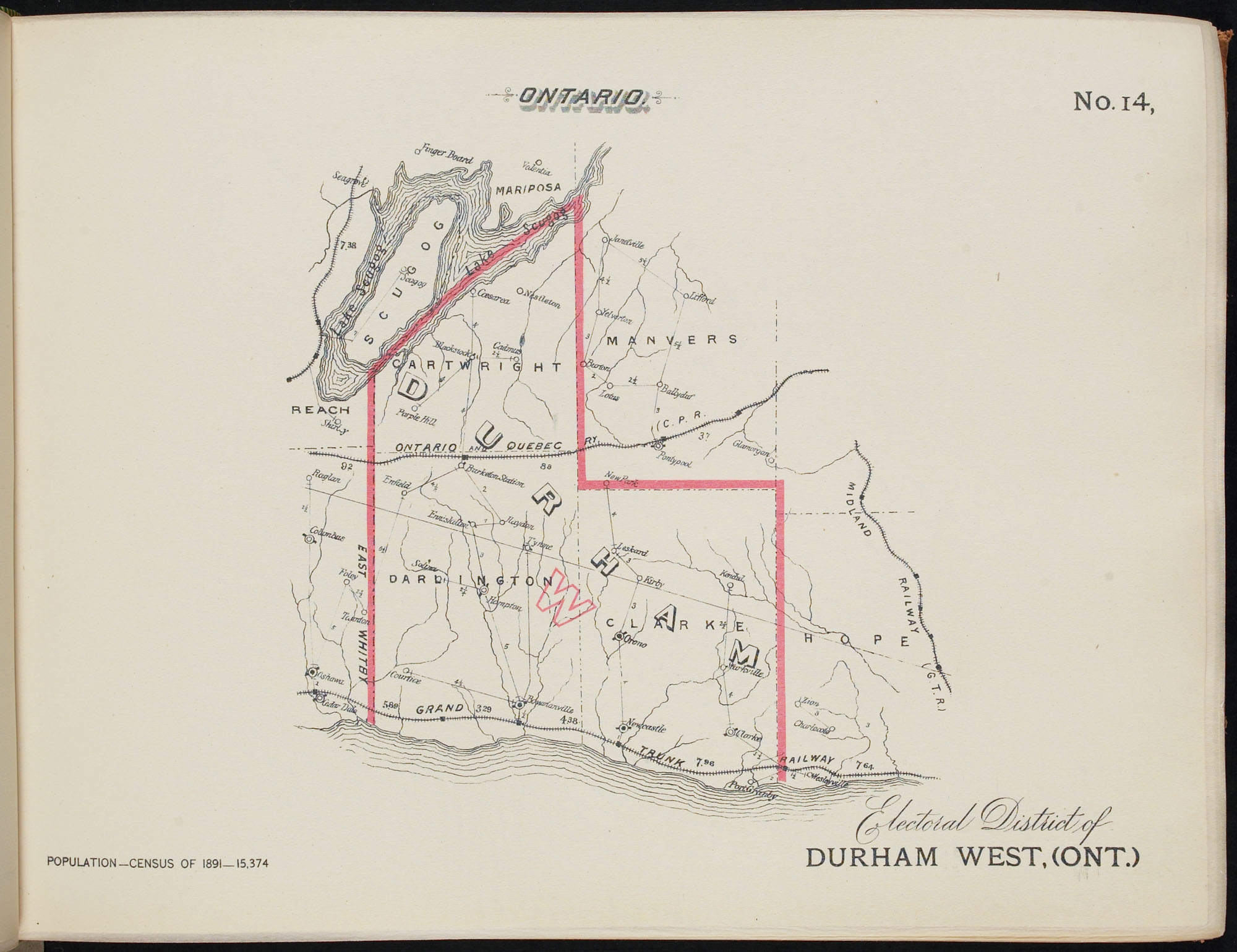
Map of the Durham West riding, c. 1895

Durham West was a federal electoral district represented in the House of Commons of Canada from 1867 to 1904. It was located in the province of Ontario. It was created by the British North America Act 1867 which divided the county of Durham into two ridings: Durham West and Durham East.

The West Riding of Durham was abolished in 1903 when it was merged into Durham riding.

== Election results ==
1867 Canadian federal election
Party	Candidate	Votes
Liberal	Edward Blake	1,337
Unknown	J. Milne	931
Eligible voters		2,776
Source: Canadian Parliamentary Guide, 1871

1872 Canadian federal election
Party	Candidate	Votes
Liberal	Hon. Edward Blake	acclaimed

On Mr. Blake being elected for Durham West and for Bruce South and on his accepting the seat for Bruce South:

By-election on 10 April 1873
Party	Candidate	Votes
Liberal	Edmund Burke Wood	acclaimed

1874 Canadian federal election
Party	Candidate	Votes
Liberal	Hon. Edmund B. Wood	1,281
Unknown	M. Brien	736

On Mr. Wood being appointed Chief Justice, Superior Court of Manitoba:

By-election on 7 April 1874
Party	Candidate	Votes
Liberal	Harvey William Burk	1,251
Unknown	Thomas McClung	989

1878 Canadian federal election
Party	Candidate	Votes
Liberal	Harvey William Burk	1,214
Liberal–Conservative	Col. F. Cubitt	1,172

On Mr. Burk's resignation, 18 October 1879, to allow Edward Blake to stand in Durham West:

By-election on 17 November 1879
Party	Candidate	Votes
Liberal	Edward Dominick Blake	acclaimed

1882 Canadian federal election
Party	Candidate	Votes
Liberal	Hon. Edward Blake	1,497
Liberal–Conservative	C.W. Bunting	1,379

1887 Canadian federal election
Party	Candidate	Votes
Liberal	Hon. Edward Blake	1,847
Conservative	George Tate Blackstock	1,731

1891 Canadian federal election
Party	Candidate	Votes
Liberal	Robert Beith	1,962
Conservative	George Tate Blackstock	1,764

1896 Canadian federal election
Party	Candidate	Votes
Liberal	Robert Beith	1,458
Conservative	D.F. Walsh	1,406
Patrons of Industry	C.J. Thornton	428

1900 Canadian federal election
Party	Candidate	Votes
Conservative	Charles Jonas Thornton	1,637
Liberal	Robert Beith	1,597

On election being declared void, 6 October 1901:

By-election on 15 January 1902
Party	Candidate	Votes
Liberal	Robert Beith	1,740
Conservative	Charles Jonas Thornton	1,728

== See also ==
- List of Canadian electoral districts
- Historical federal electoral districts of Canada
