= East Prince =

Former federal electoral district in Prince Edward Island, Canada

Prince Edward Island electoral district

Defunct federal electoral district
- Legislature: House of Commons
- District created: 1892
- District abolished: 1903
- First contested: 1896
- Last contested: 1900

East Prince was a federal electoral district in Prince Edward Island, Canada, that was represented in the House of Commons of Canada from 1896 to 1904. This riding was created in 1892 from parts of Prince County and Queen's County ridings. It was abolished in 1903 when it was redistributed into Prince and Queen's ridings.

It consisted of the town of Summerside, the eastern part of Prince County, and parts of Queen's County.

== Election results ==
1896 Canadian federal election
| Party | Candidate | Votes |
|---|---|---|
| Liberal | YEO, John | 1,916 |
| Conservative | HUNT, Richard A. | 1,799 |

By-election: On Mr. Yeo being called to the Senate, 19 November 1898

By-election on 14 December 1898
| Party | Candidate | Votes |
| Liberal | BELL, J.H. | 1,979 |
| Conservative | LEFURGEY, A.A. | 1,934 |

1900 Canadian federal election
| Party | Candidate | Votes |
|---|---|---|
| Conservative | LEFURGEY, Alfred A. | 2,272 |
| Liberal | BELL, John Howatt | 2,047 |

== See also ==
- List of Canadian electoral districts
- Historical federal electoral districts of Canada
