= Brant North =

Former federal electoral district in Ontario, Canada

Brant North was a federal electoral district in Ontario, Canada, that was represented in the House of Commons of Canada from 1867 to 1893. It was created by the British North America Act 1867 which divided the county of Brant into two ridings: Brant North and Brant South according to a traditional division.

In 1882, the North Riding of the county of Brant was defined to consist of the townships of Ancaster, Blenheim, East Brantford and South Dumfries.

The electoral district was abolished in 1892 when it was merged into Wentworth North and Brant ridings.

== Members of Parliament ==
This riding has elected the following members of Parliament:

Parliament	Years	Member	Party
1st	1867–1872	John Young Bown	Liberal–Conservative
2nd	1872–1874	Gavin Fleming	Liberal
3rd	1874–1878	Gavin Fleming	Liberal
4th	1878–1882	Gavin Fleming	Liberal
5th	1882–1887	James Somerville	Liberal
6th	1887–1891	James Somerville	Liberal
7th	1891–1896	James Somerville	Liberal
Riding dissolved into Wentworth North and Brant

== Election results ==
1867 Canadian federal election
Party	Candidate	Votes
Liberal–Conservative	John Young Bown	672
Unknown	J. D. Clement	670
Eligible voters		1,857
Source: Canadian Parliamentary Guide, 1871

1872 Canadian federal election
Party	Candidate	Votes
Liberal	Gavin Fleming	882
Unknown	H. A. Baird	571
Source: Canadian Elections Database

1874 Canadian federal election
Party	Candidate	Votes
Liberal	Gavin Fleming	acclaimed
Source: Canadian Elections Database

1878 Canadian federal election
Party	Candidate	Votes
Liberal	Gavin Fleming	931
Unknown	Crawford	734
Source: Canadian Elections Database

1882 Canadian federal election
Party	Candidate	Votes
Liberal	James Somerville	1,603
Conservative	James R. Currey	652

1887 Canadian federal election
Party	Candidate	Votes
Liberal	James Somerville	1,660
Conservative	J.R. Curry	496

1891 Canadian federal election
Party	Candidate	Votes
Liberal	James Somerville	1,729
Conservative	R.L. Hamilton	613

== See also ==
- List of Canadian electoral districts
- Historical federal electoral districts of Canada
