= Robert Henry (Canadian politician) =

Canadian politician

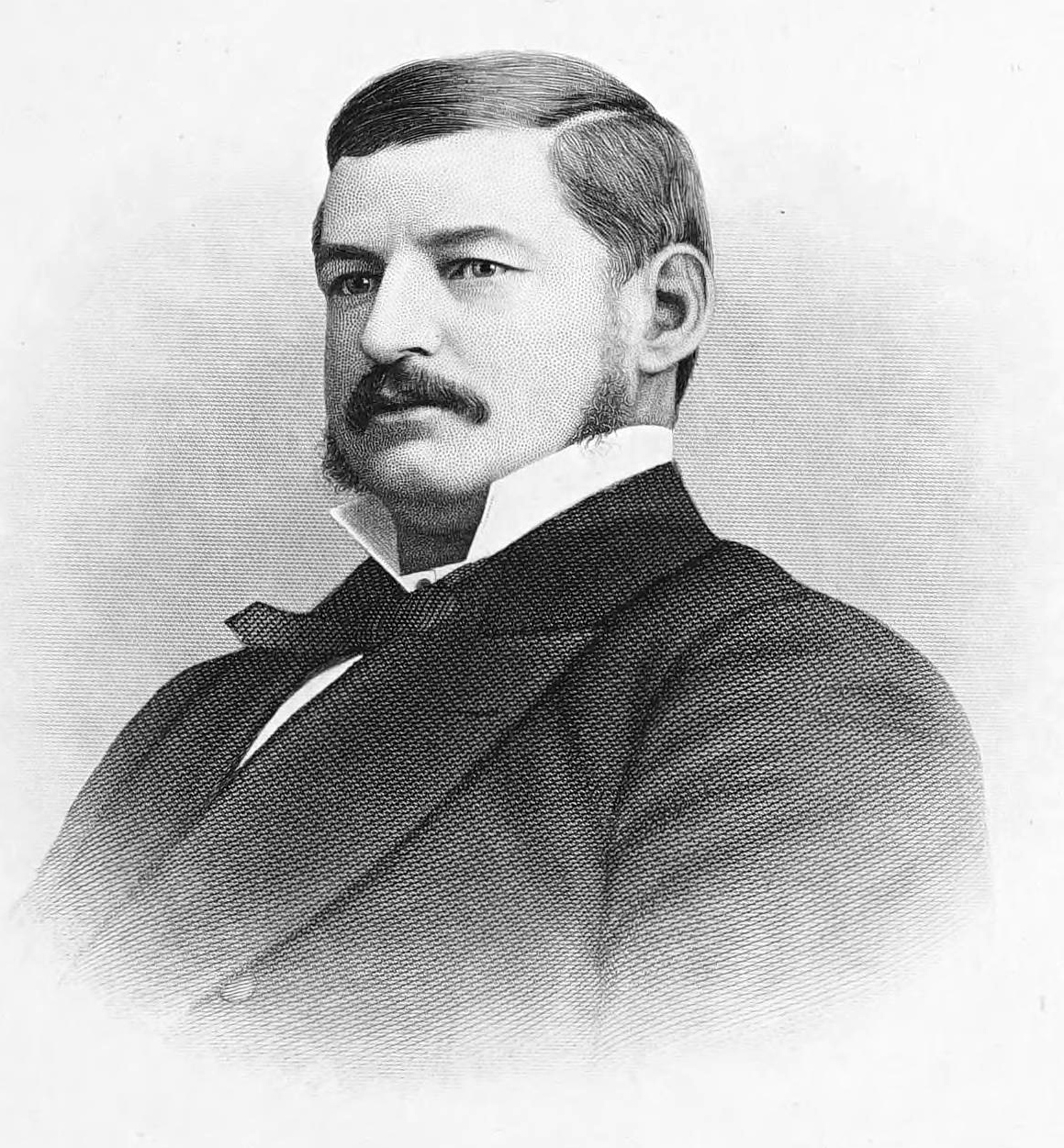
Henry in an 1880 engraving

Robert Henry (November 30, 1845 – January 30, 1918) was a Scottish-born grocer and political figure in Ontario, Canada. He represented Brant South in the House of Commons of Canada in 1896 as a Conservative. Henry was also mayor of Brantford in 1878, 1879 and 1887.

He was born in Perthshire and came to Brantford with his family in 1853. He first worked in a stationary and news store before being employed in the grocery trade. He became manager and then partner in the grocery firm of Alfred Watts. The company also operated the Brantford Soap Works. Henry was first elected to Brantford city council in 1876. He married Caroline Philip in 1879. His election to the House of Commons in 1896 was overturned and he was defeated by Charles Bernhard Heyd in the 1897 by-election which followed and in the 1900 general election. Henry moved to Detroit in 1902 and then later moved to Windsor. He returned to Brantford shortly before his death there at the age of 72.
