= Iberville (federal electoral district) =

Former federal electoral district in Quebec, Canada

Quebec electoral district

Defunct federal electoral district
- Legislature: House of Commons
- District created: 1867
- District abolished: 1892
- First contested: 1867
- Last contested: 1891

Iberville (French pronunciation: [ibɛʁvil]) was a federal electoral district in Quebec, Canada, that was represented in the House of Commons of Canada from 1867 to 1892.

It was created by the British North America Act, 1867. It was amalgamated into the St. Johns—Iberville electoral district in 1892. Its only Member of Parliament was François Béchard of the Liberal Party of Canada.

== Members of Parliament ==
This riding elected the following members of Parliament:

Parliament	Years	Member	Party
Iberville
1st	1867–1872	François Béchard	Liberal
2nd	1872–1874	François Béchard	Liberal
3rd	1874–1878	François Béchard	Liberal
4th	1878–1882	François Béchard	Liberal
5th	1882–1887	François Béchard	Liberal
6th	1887–1891	François Béchard	Liberal
7th	1891–1896	François Béchard	Liberal
Riding dissolved into St. Johns—Iberville

== Election results ==
1867 Canadian federal election
Party	Candidate	Votes	Elected
Liberal	François Béchard	1,035	✓
Unknown	Alexandre Dufresne	504	
Source: Canadian Elections Database

1872 Canadian federal election
Party	Candidate	Votes
Liberal	François Béchard	acclaimed
Source: Canadian Elections Database

1874 Canadian federal election
Party	Candidate	Votes
Liberal	François Béchard	acclaimed
Source: lop.parl.ca

1878 Canadian federal election
Party	Candidate	Votes
Liberal	François Béchard	929
Unknown	Ch. Thibeault	700

1882 Canadian federal election
Party	Candidate	Votes
Liberal	François Béchard	acclaimed

1887 Canadian federal election
Party	Candidate	Votes
Liberal	François Béchard	acclaimed

1891 Canadian federal election
Party	Candidate	Votes
Liberal	François Béchard	1,029
Conservative	Joseph A. Nadeau	545

== See also ==
- List of Canadian electoral districts
- Historical federal electoral districts of Canada
