= Québec Centre =

Federal electoral district in Quebec, Canada

Coordinates: 46°49′N 71°16′W

Quebec electoral district
- Interactive map of riding boundaries from the 2025 federal election

Federal electoral district
- Legislature: House of Commons
MP
Jean-Yves Duclos
Liberal
- District created: 1966
- First contested: 1968
- Last contested: 2025
- District webpage: profile, map

Demographics
- Population (2021): 98,772
- Electors (2025): 82,553
- Area (km²): 34.49
- Pop. density (per km²): 2,863.8
- Census division: Quebec City
- Census subdivision(s): Quebec City (part), Notre-Dame-des-Anges

Québec Centre (French: Québec-Centre; formerly Québec and Langelier) is a federal electoral district that has been represented in the House of Commons of Canada since 1968. It is located in Quebec City in the province of Quebec, Canada.

Since its creation, the riding has been a provincial bellwether in federal elections. No party has ever carried this riding without winning the most seats in Quebec.

== History ==
This riding was created as "Langelier" riding in 1966 from parts of Quebec East, Quebec South and Quebec West ridings. It was renamed "Québec" in 1990. Since its inception, this riding has always been represented by the party with the most support in Quebec.

=== Former boundaries ===
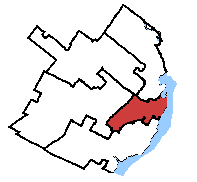
2004 to 2011 election

== Geography ==
The riding, in the Quebec region of Capitale-Nationale, consists of the central part of Quebec City, including the borough of La Cité and the southern part of the borough of Les Rivières, as well as the parish municipality of Notre-Dame-des-Anges.

The neighbouring ridings are Louis-Hébert, Louis-Saint-Laurent, Charlesbourg—Haute-Saint-Charles, Beauport—Limoilou, and Bellechasse—Les Etchemins—Lévis.

The riding gained a small fraction of territory from Louis-Hébert as a result of the 2012 electoral redistribution.

Following the 2022 federal electoral redistribution the riding was renamed Québec Centre. It will also gain the area east of Av. Maguire from Louis-Hébert.

== Demographics ==
According to the 2011 Canadian census

Ethnic groups: 91.4% White, 3.2% Indigenous, 1.6% Latino, 1.5% Black, 2.3% other
Languages: 92.7% French, 1.9% English, 1.6% Spanish, 3.8% other
Religions: 79.6% Christian, 1.4% Muslim, 0.8% other, 18.2% none
Median income: $28,603 (2010)
Average income: $35,961 (2010)

== Riding associations ==
Riding associations are the local branches of political parties:

Party	Association name	CEO	HQ City
Conservative	Association du Parti conservateur Québec-Centre	Mario Lapointe	Quebec City
Liberal	Association Libérale Fédérale de Québec Centre	Marc-Etienne Vien	Quebec City
Marijuana	Parti Marijuana de Québec (PMQ)	Danny Légaré	Saint-Félix-de-Valois
New Democratic	Association NPD Québec Centre	Victoria I. Venet	Quebec City

== Members of Parliament ==
Parliament	Years	Member	Party
Quebec-Centre
1st	1867–1872	Georges-Honoré Simard	Conservative
2nd	1872–1874	Joseph-Édouard Cauchon	Independent
3rd	1874–1875	Joseph-Édouard Cauchon	Liberal
3rd	1875–1877	Joseph-Édouard Cauchon	Liberal
3rd	1877–1878	Jacques Malouin	Independent
4th	1878–1882	Jacques Malouin	Independent
5th	1882–1887	Joseph-Guillaume Bossé	Conservative
6th	1887–1891	François Langelier	Liberal
7th	1891–1896	François Langelier	Liberal
8th	1896–1898	François Langelier	Liberal
8th	1898–1900	Albert Malouin	Liberal
9th	1900–1904	Albert Malouin	Liberal
10th	1904–1905	Albert Malouin	Liberal
10th	1905–1908	Arthur Lachance	Liberal
11th	1908–1911	Arthur Lachance	Liberal
12th	1911–1917	Arthur Lachance	Liberal
Riding dissolved into Quebec East and Quebec South
Langelier; Riding created from Quebec East, Quebec South and Quebec West
28th	1968–1972	Jean Marchand	Liberal
29th	1972–1974	Jean Marchand	Liberal
30th	1974–1976	Jean Marchand	Liberal
30th	1977–1979	Gilles Lamontagne	Liberal
31st	1979–1980	Gilles Lamontagne	Liberal
32nd	1980–1984	Gilles Lamontagne	Liberal
33rd	1984–1988	Michel Côté	Progressive Conservative
34th	1988–1993	Gilles Loiselle	Progressive Conservative
Québec
35th	1993–1997	Christiane Gagnon	Bloc Québécois
36th	1997–2000	Christiane Gagnon	Bloc Québécois
37th	2000–2004	Christiane Gagnon	Bloc Québécois
38th	2004–2006	Christiane Gagnon	Bloc Québécois
39th	2006–2008	Christiane Gagnon	Bloc Québécois
40th	2008–2011	Christiane Gagnon	Bloc Québécois
41st	2011–2015	Annick Papillon	New Democratic
42nd	2015–2019	Jean-Yves Duclos	Liberal
43rd	2019–2021	Jean-Yves Duclos	Liberal
44th	2021–2025	Jean-Yves Duclos	Liberal
Québec Centre
45th	2025–present	Jean-Yves Duclos	Liberal

== Election results ==
=== Québec Centre ===
2025 Canadian federal election
Party	Candidate	Votes	%	±%	Expenditures
Liberal	Jean-Yves Duclos	27,879	49.50	+13.78	$107,422.75
Bloc Québécois	Simon Bérubé	20,199	35.87	+6.84	$75,802.46
New Democratic	Tommy Bureau	4,400	7.81	–4.89	$2,315.37
People's	Daniel Brisson	2,818	5.00	+3.42	$2,349.08
Independent	Patrick Kerr	1,020	1.81	N/A	$639.88
Total valid votes/expense limit		–	–	–	$129,108.54
Total rejected ballots		–			
Turnout		56,316	68.22		
Eligible voters		82,553			
Liberal notional hold		Swing		+3.47	
Source: Elections Canada

2021 federal election redistributed results
Party	Vote	%
Liberal	19,361	35.72
Bloc Québécois	15,734	29.03
Conservative	9,766	18.02
New Democratic	6,882	12.70
Green	1,277	2.36
People's	855	1.58
Others	320	0.59

=== Québec, 1993–2021 ===
2021 Canadian federal election: Québec
Party	Candidate	Votes	%	±%	Expenditures
Liberal	Jean-Yves Duclos	18,132	35.4	+2.1	$92,776.01
Bloc Québécois	Louis Sansfaçon	14,824	29.0	-3.7	$32,198.69
Conservative	Bianca Boutin	9,239	18.0	+3.0	$29,033.90
New Democratic	Tommy Bureau	6,652	13.0	+1.5	$3,937.02
Green	Patrick Kerr	1,182	2.3	-3.1	$1,000.50
People's	Daniel Brisson	855	1.7	+0.5	$1,276.16
Free	Karine Simard	307	0.6	N/A	$421.51
Total valid votes/expense limit		51,191	98.0	–	$109,641.82
Total rejected ballots		1,026	2.0		
Turnout		52,217	67.6		
Eligible voters		77,298			
Liberal hold		Swing		+2.9	
Source: Elections Canada

2019 Canadian federal election: Québec
Party	Candidate	Votes	%	±%	Expenditures
Liberal	Jean-Yves Duclos	18,047	33.3	+4.4	$80,667.63
Bloc Québécois	Christiane Gagnon	17,722	32.7	+13.85	none listed
Conservative	Bianca Boutin	8,118	15.0	-6.79	$38,447.35
New Democratic	Tommy Bureau	6,220	11.5	-15.54	$6,381.41
Green	Luc Joli-Coeur	2,949	5.4	+2.49	$9,773.82
People's	Bruno Dabiré	674	1.2	–	none listed
Rhinoceros	Sébastien CoRhino	347	0.6	–	none listed
Pour l'Indépendance du Québec	Luc Paquin	119	0.2	–	none listed
Total valid votes/expense limit		54,198	100.0		
Total rejected ballots		1,051			
Turnout		55,249	70.0		
Eligible voters		78,950			
Liberal hold		Swing		-1.3	
Source: Elections Canada

2015 Canadian federal election
Party	Candidate	Votes	%	±%	Expenditures
Liberal	Jean-Yves Duclos	15,566	28.90	+19.88	$45,987.20
New Democratic	Annick Papillon	14,566	27.04	-15.60	$33,392.85
Conservative	Pierre-Thomas Asselin	11,737	21.79	+4.02	$17,402.72
Bloc Québécois	Charles Mordret	10,153	18.85	-9.11	$41,425.08
Green	Philippe Riboty	1,570	2.91	+0.74	$1,006.90
Marxist–Leninist	Normand Fournier	153	0.28	–	–
Strength in Democracy	Danielle Provost	122	0.23	–	–
Total valid votes/expense limit		53,867	100.00		$214,308.69
Total rejected ballots		820	1.50	–	
Turnout		54,687	69.09	–	
Eligible voters		79,157			
Liberal gain from New Democratic		Swing		+17.74	
Source: Elections Canada

2011 federal election redistributed results
Party	Vote	%
New Democratic	22,394	42.64
Bloc Québécois	14,685	27.96
Conservative	9,331	17.77
Liberal	4,736	9.02
Green	1,144	2.18
Others	228	0.43

2011 Canadian federal election
Party	Candidate	Votes	%	±%	Expenditures
New Democratic	Annick Papillon	22,393	42.6	+30.8	
Bloc Québécois	Christiane Gagnon	14,684	28.0	-13.8	
Conservative	Pierre Morasse	9,330	17.8	-7.9	
Liberal	François Payeur	4,735	9.0	-8.5	
Green	Yvan Dutil	1,144	2.2	-1.1	
Christian Heritage	Stefan Jetchick	228	0.4	-	
Total valid votes/expense limit		52,514	100.0		
Total rejected ballots		801	1.5	–	
Turnout		53,315	66.3	+3.6	
Eligible voters		80,402	–	–	

2008 Canadian federal election
Party	Candidate	Votes	%	±%	Expenditures
Bloc Québécois	Christiane Gagnon	21,064	41.8	+0.2	$59,021
Conservative	Myriam Taschereau	12,943	25.7	-4.1	$70,315
Liberal	Damien Rousseau	8,845	17.5	+6.1	$13,132
New Democratic	Catheryn Roy-Goyette	5,933	11.8	+2.5	$6,186
Green	Yonnel Bonaventure	1,650	3.3	-1.6	
Total valid votes/expense limit		50,435	100.00	$85,897	
Total rejected ballots		632	1.2		
Turnout		51,067	62.7		

2006 Canadian federal election
Party	Candidate	Votes	%	±%	Expenditures
Bloc Québécois	Christiane Gagnon	20,845	41.5	-9.1	$52,012
Conservative	Frédérik Boisvert	14,943	29.8	+18.7	$67,922
Liberal	Caroline Drolet	5,743	11.4	-15.5	$23,986
New Democratic	Michaël Lessard	4,629	9.2	+3.7	$5,287
Green	Yonnel Bonaventure	2,372	4.7	+0.5	
Independent	Dan Aubut	813	1.6	–	$100
Progressive Canadian	Alexandre Raymond-Labrie	520	1.0		$77
Libertarian	Francis Bedard	325	0.6	–	$0
Total valid votes/expense limit		50,190	100.0	$80,394	

2004 Canadian federal election: Québec
Party	Candidate	Votes	%	Expenditures
Bloc Québécois	Christiane Gagnon	24,373	50.63	$51,839
Liberal	Jean-Philippe Côté	12,982	26.97	$72,065
Conservative	Pierre Gaudreault	5,330	11.07	$13,725
New Democratic	Jean-Marie Fiset	2,670	5.55	$518
Green	Antonine Yaccarini	2,046	4.25	$2,723
Marijuana	Pierre-Etienne Paradis	512	1.06	not listed
Marxist–Leninist	Jean Bédard	223	0.46	not listed
Total valid votes		48,136	100.00	
Total rejected ballots		1,040		
Turnout		49,176	60.77	
Electors on the lists		80,916		
Percentage change figures are factored for redistribution. Conservative Party percentages are contrasted with the combined Canadian Alliance and Progressive Conservative percentages from 2000. Sources: Official Results, Elections Canada and Financial Returns, Elections Canada.

2000 Canadian federal election
Party	Candidate	Votes	%	±%
Bloc Québécois	Christiane Gagnon	22,793	43.4	-1.1
Liberal	Claudette Tessier Couture	18,619	35.5	+3.1
Alliance	Michel Rivard	3,980	7.6	
Progressive Conservative	Marc Jalbert	3,171	6.0	-12.5
New Democratic	Jean-Marie Fiset	1,714	3.3	-1.3
Marijuana	Pierre-E. Paradis	1,480	2.8	
Natural Law	Gilles Rochette	482	0.9	
Marxist–Leninist	Claude Moreau	255	0.5	
Total valid votes		52,494	100.0	

1997 Canadian federal election
Party	Candidate	Votes	%	±%
Bloc Québécois	Christiane Gagnon	24,817	44.5	-9.2
Liberal	Claudette Tessier-Couture	18,062	32.4	+5.4
Progressive Conservative	Marc Jalbert	10,309	18.5	+4.8
New Democratic	Jean-Marie Fiset	2,556	4.6	+2.5
Total valid votes		55,744	100.0	

1993 Canadian federal election
Party	Candidate	Votes	%	±%
Bloc Québécois	Christiane Gagnon	27,788	53.7	
Liberal	Jean Pelletier	13,965	27.0	-1.2
Progressive Conservative	Gilles Loiselle	7,077	13.7	-33.0
New Democratic	Majella Desmeules	1,067	2.1	-18.0
Natural Law	Danielle Charland	883	1.7	
Green	Richard Domm	786	1.5	-2.1
Abolitionist	Ernst Fernandez	158	0.3	
Total valid votes		51,724	100.0	

=== Langelier, 1968–1993 ===
1988 Canadian federal election
Party	Candidate	Votes	%	±%
Progressive Conservative	Gilles Loiselle	24,555	46.7	+3.6
Liberal	Marielle Guay-Mineault	14,843	28.2	-7.6
New Democratic	Pauline Gingras	10,586	20.1	+8.4
Green	Gilles Fontaine	1,931	3.7	
Independent	France Tremblay	402	0.8	
Independent	Alexandre Roy	319	0.6	
Total valid votes		52,636	100.0	
Progressive Conservative hold		Swing		+5.6

1984 Canadian federal election
Party	Candidate	Votes	%	±%
Progressive Conservative	Michel Côté	16,872	43.1	+35.5
Liberal	Florence Ievers	14,004	35.8	-35.7
New Democratic	Majella Desmeules	4,597	11.7	+3.6
Rhinoceros	Jean Obélix Lefebvre	2,576	6.6	-1.6
Parti nationaliste	André Binette	919	2.3	
Social Credit	Christian Landry	189	0.5	-3.0
Total valid votes		39,157	100.0	
Progressive Conservative gain from Liberal		Swing		+35.6

1980 Canadian federal election
Party	Candidate	Votes	%	±%
Liberal	J. Gilles Lamontagne	24,714	71.5	+4.9
Rhinoceros	Jean Obelix Lefebvre	2,813	8.1	+3.5
New Democratic	Edith Frankel	2,811	8.1	-1.6
Progressive Conservative	Pierre Linteau	2,606	7.5	+1.9
Social Credit	André Bergeron	1,191	3.4	-8.7
Union populaire	Brigitte Fortier	252	0.7	+0.2
Marxist–Leninist	Jacques Goulet	115	0.3	-0.1
Communist	Claude Demers	68	0.2	-0.2
Total valid votes		34,570	100.0	

1979 Canadian federal election
Party	Candidate	Votes	%	±%
Liberal	J. Gilles Lamontagne	25,931	66.6	0.0
Social Credit	André Simoneau	4,748	12.2	+8.8
New Democratic	Raymond Lavoie	3,773	9.7	+3.7
Progressive Conservative	Paul Michaud	2,186	5.6	-16.0
Rhinoceros	Jean Lefebvre	1,824	4.7	
Union populaire	Maurice Gagnon	195	0.5	
Marxist–Leninist	Jacques Goulet	156	0.4	
Communist	Claude Demers	140	0.4	0.0
Total valid votes		38,953	100.0	

Canadian federal by-election, 24 May 1977
Party	Candidate	Votes	%	±%
On Mr. Marchand's resignation, 26 October 1976
Liberal	Gilles Lamontagne	12,171	66.5	+3.0
Progressive Conservative	Maurice Hamel	3,952	21.6	+9.7
New Democratic	Jean Daoust	1,104	6.0	+0.8
Social Credit	Sauveur Fradette	618	3.4	-12.3
Independent	Jean Marie Béland	213	1.2	
Communist	Jeannette Walsh	166	0.9	
Independent	Gérard Langlois	67	0.4	
Total valid votes		18,291	100.0	

1974 Canadian federal election: Langelier
Party	Candidate	Votes	%	±%
Liberal	Jean Marchand	13,557	63.6	+6.3
Social Credit	Sauveur Fradette	3,344	15.7	-8.1
Progressive Conservative	Normand Robidoux	2,530	11.9	-0.6
New Democratic	Clément Gilbert	1,110	5.2	
Independent	Albert Lemoine	337	1.6	
Independent	Micheline Roberge	184	0.9	
Marxist–Leninist	Michel Papayre	161	0.8	-0.6
Independent	Lionel Larocque	97	0.5	
Total valid votes		21,320	100.0	
Liberal hold		Swing		+7.2%
Mr. Papayre's result as a Marxist–Leninist candidate is compared to his result in the 1972 general election as an independent candidate.

1972 Canadian federal election: Langelier
Party	Candidate	Votes	%	±%
Liberal	Jean Marchand	14,725	57.3	+18.3
Social Credit	J. Wilfrid Dufresne	6,101	23.7	-7.2
Progressive Conservative	Albert Lemoine	3,206	12.5	-15.3
Independent	Guy Jean	1,313	5.1	
Independent	Michel Parayre	349	1.4	
Total valid votes		25,694	100.0	
Liberal hold		Swing		+12.8%
(Social Credit vote is compared to Ralliement créditiste vote in the 1968 election.)

1968 Canadian federal election: Langelier
Party	Candidate	Votes	%
Liberal	Jean Marchand	11,439	39.0
Ralliement créditiste	Guy Jean	8,770	29.9
Progressive Conservative	Rodrigue Pageau	8,150	27.8
New Democratic	Pierre Pourtier	658	2.2
Ralliement créditiste	Michel Roy	308	1.1
Total valid votes		29,325	100.0

== See also ==
- List of Canadian electoral districts
- Historical federal electoral districts of Canada
