= By-elections to the 10th Canadian Parliament =

By-elections to the 10th Canadian Parliament were held to elect members of the House of Commons of Canada between the 1904 federal election and the 1908 federal election. The Liberal Party of Canada led a majority government for the 10th Canadian Parliament.

The list includes Ministerial by-elections which occurred due to the requirement that Members of Parliament recontest their seats upon being appointed to Cabinet. These by-elections were almost always uncontested. This requirement was abolished in 1931.

Alberta and Saskatchewan entered Confederation in 1905. Unlike in the case of other provinces that joined after 1867, the new provinces were already represented by ridings originally drawn for the Northwest Territories, and the members elected in 1904 continued to sit as representatives of the old NWT ridings (some of which straddled the new border), except where they resigned as indicated below.

By-election	Date	Incumbent	Party	Winner	Party	Cause	Retained
Stanstead	January 22, 1908	Henry Lovell	Liberal	Charles Henry Lovell	Liberal	Death	Yes
Huron South	January 22, 1908	Benjamin B. Gunn	Conservative	Murdo Young McLean	Liberal	Death	No
Nicolet	December 30, 1907	Charles Ramsay Devlin	Liberal	Gustave-Adolphe-Narcisse Turcotte	Liberal	Resignation upon appointment to the provincial cabinet of Quebec	Yes
City of Ottawa	December 23, 1907	Napoléon Antoine Belcourt	Liberal	William H. Hutchison	Liberal	Called to the Senate	Yes
Labelle	December 23, 1907	Henri Bourassa	Liberal	Charles Beautron Major	Liberal	Resignation to enter provincial politics	Yes
York Centre	December 23, 1907	Archibald Campbell	Liberal	Peter Douglas McLean	Liberal	Called to the Senate	Yes
Colchester	November 28, 1907	Frederick Andrew Laurence	Liberal	John Stanfield	Conservative	Appointed a judge	No
London	October 29, 1907	C. S. Hyman	Liberal	Thomas Beattie	Conservative	Resignation	No
Northumberland East	October 29, 1907	Edward Cochrane	Conservative	Charles Lewis Owen	Conservative	Death	Yes
Wellington North	October 29, 1907	Thomas Martin	Liberal	Alexander Munro Martin	Liberal	Death	Yes
Brockville	September 18, 1907	Daniel Derbyshire	Liberal	George Perry Graham	Liberal	Called to the Senate	Yes
City and County of St. John	September 18, 1907	Alfred Augustus Stockton	Conservative	William Pugsley	Liberal	Death	No
Richelieu	March 7, 1907	Arthur-Aimé Bruneau	Liberal	Adélard Lanctôt	Liberal	Appointed a judge of the Superior Court of Quebec	Yes
L'Assomption	March 7, 1907	Romuald-Charlemagne Laurier	Liberal	Ruben Charles Laurier	Liberal	Death	Yes
Victoria	March 5, 1907	John Costigan	Liberal	Pius Michaud	Liberal	Called to the Senate	Yes
Three Rivers and St. Maurice	February 28, 1907	Jacques Bureau	Liberal	Jacques Bureau	Liberal	Recontested upon appointment as Solicitor General	Yes
Nicolet	December 29, 1906	Rodolphe Lemieux	Liberal	Charles Ramsay Devlin	Liberal	Chose to sit for Gaspé	Yes
St. Ann	November 21, 1906	Daniel Gallery	Liberal	Joseph Charles Walsh	Liberal	Election declared void	Yes
St. Mary	November 21, 1906	Camille Piché	Liberal	Médéric Martin	Liberal	Appointed Police Magistrate in Montreal.	Yes
Shelburne and Queen's	October 31, 1906	William Stevens Fielding	Liberal	William Stevens Fielding	Liberal	Election declared void	Yes
Bruce North	October 30, 1906	Leonard Thomas Bland	Liberal-Conservative	John Tolmie	Liberal	Death	No
Quebec County	October 23, 1906	Charles Fitzpatrick	Liberal	Lorenzo Robitaille	Independent Liberal	Appointed Chief Justice of Canada	No
St. Johns—Iberville	October 16, 1906	Louis Philippe Demers	Liberal	Marie Joseph Demers	Liberal	Appointed Puisne Judge of the Superior Court of Quebec	Yes
Elgin East	October 14, 1906	Andrew B. Ingram	Liberal-Conservative	David Marshall	Conservative	Appointed Vice Chairman of the Ontario Railway and Municipal Commission	Yes
Renfrew North	October 9, 1906	Peter White	Conservative	Gerald Verner White	Conservative	Death	Yes
Strathcona	April 5, 1906	Peter Talbot	Liberal	Wilbert McIntyre	Liberal	Called to the Senate	Yes
Cape Breton North and Victoria	March 14, 1906	Daniel Duncan McKenzie	Liberal	Alexander Charles Ross	Liberal	Appointed a judge	Yes
Victoria City	March 6, 1906	George Riley	Liberal	William Templeman	Liberal	Resignation to provide a seat for Templeman	Yes
Maisonneuve	February 23, 1906	Raymond Préfontaine	Liberal	Alphonse Verville	Labour	Death	No
Assiniboia West	February 6, 1906	Thomas Walter Scott	Liberal	William Erskine Knowles	Liberal	Resignation to enter provincial politics in Saskatchewan	Yes
Saskatchewan	February 6, 1906	John Henderson Lamont	Liberal	George Ewan McCraney	Liberal	Resignation to enter provincial politics in Saskatchewan	Yes
Town of Sherbrooke	February 6, 1906	Arthur Norreys Worthington	Conservative	Arthur Norreys Worthington	Conservative	Election declared void	Yes
Compton	January 4, 1906	Aylmer Byron Hunt	Liberal	Aylmer Byron Hunt	Liberal	Election declared void	Yes
York North	November 22, 1905	William Mulock	Liberal	Allen Bristol Aylesworth	Liberal	Appointed a judge	Yes
Antigonish	November 22, 1905	Colin McIsaac	Liberal	William Chisholm	Liberal	Appointed a Railway Commissioner	Yes
Lambton West	November 22, 1905	Thomas George Johnston	Liberal	Frederick Forsyth Pardee	Liberal	Death	Yes
Wentworth	November 22, 1905	E. D. Smith	Conservative	E. D. Smith	Conservative	Election declared void	Yes
London	June 13, 1905	C. S. Hyman	Liberal	C. S. Hyman	Liberal	Recontested upon appointment as Minister of Public Works	Yes
Oxford North	June 13, 1905	James Sutherland	Liberal	George Smith	Liberal	Death	Yes
Lévis	June 6, 1905	Louis Julien Demers	Liberal	Louis Auguste Carrier	Liberal	Death	Yes
Edmonton	April 25, 1905	Frank Oliver	Liberal	Frank Oliver	Liberal	Recontested upon appointment as Minister of the Interior.	Yes
Toronto Centre	April 11, 1905	Edward Frederick Clarke	Conservative	Edmund James Bristol	Conservative	Death	Yes
Wright	February 13, 1905	Wilfrid Laurier	Liberal	Emmanuel Berchmans Devlin	Liberal	Chose to sit for Quebec East	Yes
Carleton	February 4, 1905	Edward Kidd	Conservative	Robert L. Borden	Conservative	Resignation to provide a seat for Borden	Yes
Quebec-Centre	January 19, 1905	Arthur Cyrille Albert Malouin	Liberal	Arthur Lachance	Liberal	Appointed a judge of the Superior Court of Quebec	Yes

== See also ==
- List of federal by-elections in Canada

== Sources ==
- Parliament of Canada–Elected in By-Elections
