= Lewis Johnstone =

Lewis Johnstone may refer to:

- Lew Johnstone (1916–1983), Australian politician
- Lewis Wilkieson Johnstone (1862–1936), Canadian politician
