= Fenwick Lionel Kelly =

Canadian politician

Member of Parliament for North Cape Breton and Victoria
- In office July 1923 – September 1925
- Preceded by: Daniel Duncan McKenzie
- Succeeded by: Lewis Wilkieson Johnstone

Personal details
- Born: Fenwick Lionel Kelly; 28 March 1863 North Sydney, Nova Scotia
- Died: 7 February 1944 (aged 80) North Sydney, Nova Scotia
- Party: Liberal
- Spouse: Laidee Cohoon
- Profession: broker, farmer, merchant

Fenwick Lionel Kelly (28 March 1863 – 7 February 1944) was a Liberal party member of the House of Commons of Canada. He was born in North Sydney, Nova Scotia and became a broker, farmer and merchant.

The son of James Kelly and Rachel Way, he was educated in North Sydney and entered business there. In 1891, he married Laidee Cohoon.

He was first elected to Parliament at the North Cape Breton and Victoria riding in a by-election on 31 July 1923 after Daniel Duncan McKenzie was named to the Supreme Court of Nova Scotia. After completing the remainder of the term of the 14th Canadian Parliament, Kelly was defeated in the 1925 federal election by Lewis Wilkieson Johnstone of the Conservatives, as the riding was then renamed Cape Breton North—Victoria.
