= Québec-Centre =

Québec-Centre may refer to:

- Quebec-Centre, a former federal electoral district in the area of Quebec City
- Québec-Centre (provincial electoral district), a former provincial electoral district in the area of Quebec City
