= Robert Muir (politician) =

Canadian politician, Coal miner, Union Official

The Honourable Robert Muir

Member of Parliament
- In office 10 June 1957 – 24 June 1968
- Preceded by: William Murdoch Buchanan – Liberal
- Succeeded by: Electoral district abolished
- Constituency: Cape Breton North and Victoria

Member of Parliament
- In office 25 June 1968 – 26 March 1979
- Preceded by: Electoral district established
- Succeeded by: Russell MacLellan – Liberal
- Constituency: Cape Breton—The Sydneys

Senator for Nova Scotia
- In office 28 March 1979 – 10 November 1994
- Constituency: Cape Breton—The Sydneys

Personal details
- Born: 10 November 1919 Edinburgh, Scotland
- Died: 31 August 2011 (aged 91) Coxheath, Nova Scotia, Canada
- Party: Progressive Conservative
- Profession: Miner, businessman, salesman

Robert Muir (10 November 1919 – 31 August 2011) was a Canadian Member of Parliament, first in the House of Commons and later in the Senate. Muir sat in both chambers as a member of the Progressive Conservative Party of Canada. He was born in Scotland and raised on Cape Breton Island, Nova Scotia. Before he became a politician, he was also a miner, a union official, a salesman and a businessman during his career. He died at his home in the Cape Breton Regional Municipality in 2011.

== Early life ==
Muir was born in Edinburgh, Scotland on 10 November 1919. After his father died in 1920, he and his mother immigrated to Canada. After leaving school in grade 8, he worked in the coal mines until injuries ended his ability to do so. Before he was injured for the final time, he was elected as the secretary of his United Mine Workers of America (UMW) local. After recuperating from his injuries, he worked in insurance for London Life until he was elected to parliament. He later served as chair of the Miners' Hospital in Cape Breton.

== Political career ==
Muir began politics as a member of the Sydney Mines, Nova Scotia municipal council, where he served from 1948 to 1958. He entered federal politics in the 1957 Canadian general election, winning the Cape Breton North and Victoria electoral district in Nova Scotia. His old riding was abolished after the 1966 electoral district redistribution. Muir then ran in the newly created Cape Breton—The Sydneys electoral district in the 1968 Canadian general election and won the seat. Muir won election eight consecutive times, stepping down in 1979 after having served in the 30th Canadian Parliament.

On 28 March 1979, two-days after an election call, Liberal Prime Minister Pierre Trudeau appointed Muir to the Senate. Muir sat in the self-designated Senate division of Cape Breton-The Sydneys. Muir retired from the Senate on 10 November 1994. He died at home, in Coxheath, Nova Scotia on 31 August 2011, aged 91, from respiratory failure.
