= Jean-Yves Duclos =

Canadian politician and economist (born 1965)

The Honourable Jean-Yves Duclos PC MP FRSC
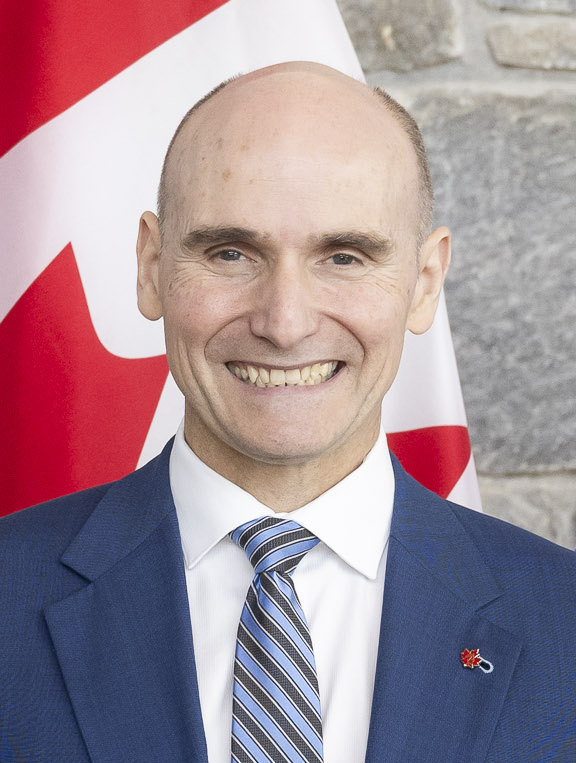
- Duclos in 2024

Minister of Public Services and Procurement Receiver General for Canada
- In office July 26, 2023 – March 14, 2025
- Prime Minister: Justin Trudeau
- Preceded by: Helena Jaczek
- Succeeded by: Ali Ehsassi

Minister of Health
- In office October 26, 2021 – July 26, 2023
- Prime Minister: Justin Trudeau
- Preceded by: Patty Hajdu
- Succeeded by: Mark Holland

President of the Treasury Board
- In office November 20, 2019 – October 26, 2021
- Prime Minister: Justin Trudeau
- Preceded by: Joyce Murray
- Succeeded by: Mona Fortier

Minister of Families, Children and Social Development
- In office November 4, 2015 – November 20, 2019
- Prime Minister: Justin Trudeau
- Preceded by: Pierre Poilievre
- Succeeded by: Ahmed Hussen

Member of Parliament for Québec Centre Québec (2015–2025)
- Incumbent
- Assumed office October 19, 2015
- Preceded by: Annick Papillon

Personal details
- Born: Jean-Yves Duclos; 13 June 1965 (age 61) Quebec City, Quebec, Canada
- Party: Liberal
- Education: University of Alberta (BA); London School of Economics (MA, PhD)
- Profession: Economist, professor

Jean-Yves Duclos PC MP FRSC (French pronunciation: [ʒɑ̃iv dyklo]; born 1965) is a Canadian economist and politician who has been the member of Parliament (MP) for Québec Centre since 2015. A member of the Liberal Party, Duclos previously served as Minister of Families, Children and Social Development from 2015 to 2019, President of the Treasury Board from 2019 to 2021, Minister of Health from 2021 to 2023, and Minister of Public Services and Procurement from 2023 to 2025.

== Early career and education ==
Duclos attended the University of Alberta, where he earned an undergraduate degree in economics, followed by graduate and doctoral studies in economics at the London School of Economics. His doctoral thesis in 1992 was titled "Progressivity, equity and the take-up of state benefits, with application to the 1985 British tax and benefit system". Prior to his election to the House of Commons, he headed the economics department at Université Laval and was the president-elect of the Canadian Economics Association. He was elected a Fellow of the Royal Society of Canada in 2014.

== Tenure in Parliament ==
=== Electoral history ===
In 2015, Duclos was elected to represent the riding of Québec in the House of Commons in the 2015 general election as a member of the Liberal Party of Canada. In a hotly contested four-way race, Duclos faced candidates from three parties all having more recently held the seat. Ousting incumbent NDP MP Annick Paillon by exactly 1,000 votes, Duclos became the first Liberal elected to represent this riding since Gilles Lamontagne, who left office in 1984. He also had the distinction of being the only successful Liberal candidate in the 2015 election who secured less than 30% of the vote cast.

In 2019, Duclos faced stiff competition from former Bloc MP Christiane Gagnon who represented the district for six terms between 1993 and 2011. He emerged victorious with an increased vote share of 33.3% but substantially reduced margin of 325 votes.

With comparatively less established rivals, Duclos secured his third mandate in 2021 with a 3,300 votes, 6 points margin. 2025 saw Duclos’ margin of victory over his closest rival substantially increase to 14 points, and he took 49.50% of the vote, turning the seat into an increasingly safe one. He was elected chair of the Canadian House of Commons Standing Committee on Public Safety and National Security in the 45th Canadian Parliament in 2025.

=== Cabinet career ===
Duclos served as a cabinet minister throughout the 29th Canadian Ministry, headed by Justin Trudeau. He was first appointed as Minister of Families, Children and Social Development and remained in that role throughout the first mandate.

Upon being re-elected in 2019, he was sworn in as President of the Treasury Board and served in that role throughout the second mandate.

Upon being re-elected in 2021 while the COVID-19 pandemic was ongoing, Duclos was appointed Minister of Health. This made him a prominent figure in Canadian government response to the pandemic, which he supported an end to most generalized public health restrictions, such as face mask mandates until the emergence of fourth COVID-19 wave due to the highly transmissible Deltacron hybrid variant, a pre-dominant strain in the country that is combined of Delta and Omicron variants, started from July 2021 to the end of April 2022. He also expanded the COVID-19 vaccination program in Canada.

At the cabinet shuffle on July 26, 2023, Duclos was appointed Minister of Public Services and Procurement and Receiver General for Canada.

== Electoral record ==
2025 Canadian federal election: Québec Centre
Party	Candidate	Votes	%	±%	Expenditures
Liberal	Jean-Yves Duclos	27,879	49.50	+13.78	$107,422.75
Bloc Québécois	Simon Bérubé	20,199	35.87	+6.84	$75,802.46
New Democratic	Tommy Bureau	4,400	7.81	–4.89	$2,315.37
People's	Daniel Brisson	2,818	5.00	+3.42	$2,349.08
Independent	Patrick Kerr	1,020	1.81	N/A	$639.88
Total valid votes/expense limit		–	–	–	$129,108.54
Total rejected ballots		–			
Turnout		56,316	68.22		
Eligible voters		82,553			
Liberal notional hold		Swing		+3.47	
Source: Elections Canada

2021 Canadian federal election: Québec
Party	Candidate	Votes	%	±%	Expenditures
Liberal	Jean-Yves Duclos	18,132	35.4	+2.1	$92,776.01
Bloc Québécois	Louis Sansfaçon	14,824	29.0	-3.7	$32,198.69
Conservative	Bianca Boutin	9,239	18.0	+3.0	$29,033.90
New Democratic	Tommy Bureau	6,652	13.0	+1.5	$3,937.02
Green	Patrick Kerr	1,182	2.3	-3.1	$1,000.50
People's	Daniel Brisson	855	1.7	+0.5	$1,276.16
Free	Karine Simard	307	0.6	N/A	$421.51
Total valid votes/expense limit		51,191	98.0	–	$109,641.82
Total rejected ballots		1,026	2.0		
Turnout		52,217	67.6		
Eligible voters		77,298			
Liberal hold		Swing		+2.9	
Source: Elections Canada

2019 Canadian federal election: Québec
Party	Candidate	Votes	%	±%	Expenditures
Liberal	Jean-Yves Duclos	18,047	33.3	+4.4	$80,667.63
Bloc Québécois	Christiane Gagnon	17,722	32.7	+13.85	none listed
Conservative	Bianca Boutin	8,118	15.0	-6.79	$38,447.35
New Democratic	Tommy Bureau	6,220	11.5	-15.54	$6,381.41
Green	Luc Joli-Coeur	2,949	5.4	+2.49	$9,773.82
People's	Bruno Dabiré	674	1.2	–	none listed
Rhinoceros	Sébastien CoRhino	347	0.6	–	none listed
Pour l'Indépendance du Québec	Luc Paquin	119	0.2	–	none listed
Total valid votes/expense limit		54,198	100.0		
Total rejected ballots		1,051			
Turnout		55,249	70.0		
Eligible voters		78,950			
Liberal hold		Swing		-1.3	
Source: Elections Canada

2015 Canadian federal election
Party	Candidate	Votes	%	±%	Expenditures
Liberal	Jean-Yves Duclos	15,566	28.90	+19.88	$45,987.20
New Democratic	Annick Papillon	14,566	27.04	-15.60	$33,392.85
Conservative	Pierre-Thomas Asselin	11,737	21.79	+4.02	$17,402.72
Bloc Québécois	Charles Mordret	10,153	18.85	-9.11	$41,425.08
Green	Philippe Riboty	1,570	2.91	+0.74	$1,006.90
Marxist–Leninist	Normand Fournier	153	0.28	–	–
Strength in Democracy	Danielle Provost	122	0.23	–	–
Total valid votes/Expense limit		53,867	100.00		$214,308.69
Total rejected ballots		820	1.50	–	
Turnout		54,687	69.09	–	
Eligible voters		79,157			
Liberal gain from New Democratic		Swing		+17.74	
Source: Elections Canada

29th Canadian Ministry (2015–2025) – Cabinet of Justin Trudeau
Cabinet posts (4)
Predecessor	Office	Successor
Helena Jaczek	Minister of Public Services and Procurement; July 26, 2023 – March 14, 2025	Ali Ehsassi
Patty Hajdu	Minister of Health; October 26, 2021 – July 26, 2023	Mark Holland
Joyce Murray	President of the Treasury Board; November 20, 2019 – October 26, 2021	Mona Fortier
Pierre Poilievre	Minister of Families, Children and Social Development; November 4, 2015 – November 20, 2019	Ahmed Hussen
