= Cape Breton North and Victoria =

Former federal electoral district in Nova Scotia, Canada

Nova Scotia electoral district

Defunct federal electoral district
- Legislature: House of Commons
- District created: 1903
- District abolished: 1966
- First contested: 1904
- Last contested: 1965

Cape Breton North and Victoria (also known as North Cape Breton and Victoria and Cape Breton North—Victoria) was a federal electoral district in the province of Nova Scotia, Canada, that was represented in the House of Commons of Canada from 1904 to 1968.

== History ==
This riding was created in 1903 as "North Cape Breton and Victoria"' riding from Cape Breton and Victoria ridings.

It consisted initially of the county of Victoria, the northern part of the County of Cape Breton: the districts of Boisdale, Boularderie, East Bay (North), French Vale, George's River, Grand Narrows, and Little Bras d'Or, and the towns of North Sydney and Sydney Mines.

In 1924, its name was changed to "Cape Breton North—Victoria", and then to "Cape Breton North and Victoria" in 1933. It was redefined to consist of the county of Victoria, and that part of the county of Cape Breton contained in the municipal districts of Balls Creek and Edwardsville (No. 2), Big Pond (No. 13), Boisdale (No. 9), Boularderie (No. 10), East Bay North (No. 19), East Bay South (No. 8), Enon (No. 21), Frenchvale (No. 22), George's River (No. 23), Grand Narrows (No. 14) and Little Bras d'Or (No. 4), and including the towns of Sydney Mines and North Sydney.

In 1947, the riding was expanded to include the municipal districts of Hillside (No. 3), and South Forks (No. 18).

It was abolished in 1966 when it was redistributed into Cape Breton Highlands—Canso, Cape Breton—East Richmond and Cape Breton—The Sydneys ridings.

== Members of Parliament ==
This riding elected the following members of Parliament:

Parliament	Years	Member	Party
North Cape Breton and Victoria; Riding created from Cape Breton and Victoria
10th	1904–1906	Daniel Duncan McKenzie	Liberal
10th	1906–1908	Alexander Charles Ross	Liberal
11th	1908–1911	Daniel Duncan McKenzie	Liberal
12th	1911–1917	Daniel Duncan McKenzie	Liberal
13th	1917–1921	Daniel Duncan McKenzie	Opposition (Laurier Liberals)
14th	1921–1921	Daniel Duncan McKenzie	Liberal
14th	1922–1923	Daniel Duncan McKenzie	Liberal
14th	1923–1925	Fenwick Lionel Kelly	Liberal
Cape Breton North—Victoria
15th	1925–1926	Lewis Wilkieson Johnstone	Conservative
16th	1926–1930	Lewis Wilkieson Johnstone	Conservative
17th	1930–1935	Lewis Wilkieson Johnstone	Conservative
Cape Breton North and Victoria
18th	1935–1937	Daniel Alexander Cameron	Liberal
18th	1937–1940	Matthew MacLean	Liberal
19th	1940–1945	Matthew MacLean	Liberal
20th	1945–1949	Matthew MacLean	Liberal
21st	1949–1953	Matthew MacLean	Liberal
22nd	1953–1957	William Murdoch Buchanan	Liberal
23rd	1957–1958	Robert Muir	Progressive Conservative
24th	1958–1962	Robert Muir	Progressive Conservative
25th	1962–1963	Robert Muir	Progressive Conservative
26th	1963–1965	Robert Muir	Progressive Conservative
27th	1965–1968	Robert Muir	Progressive Conservative
Riding dissolved into Cape Breton Highlands—Canso, Cape Breton—East Richmond and Cape Breton—The Sydneys

== Election results ==
=== North Cape Breton and Victoria, 1904–1925 ===
1904 Canadian federal election
Party	Candidate	Votes
Liberal	Daniel Duncan McKenzie	2,583
Conservative	John McCormick	2,519

By-election on 14 March 1906 On Mr. McKenzie being appointed judge, 16 February 1906
Party	Candidate	Votes
Liberal	Alexander Charles Ross	2,922
Conservative	John McCormick	2,088

1908 Canadian federal election
Party	Candidate	Votes
Liberal	Daniel Duncan McKenzie	2,849
Conservative	John McCormick	2,832

1911 Canadian federal election
Party	Candidate	Votes
Liberal	Daniel Duncan McKenzie	3,418
Conservative	John McCormack	2,803

1917 Canadian federal election
Party	Candidate	Votes
Opposition (Laurier Liberals)	Daniel Duncan McKenzie	4,477
Government (Unionist)	John McCormick	3,649

1921 Canadian federal election
Party	Candidate	Votes
Liberal	Daniel Duncan McKenzie	7,399
Unknown	Murdoch A. McKenzie	4,060

By-election on 19 January 1922 On Mr. McKenzie's acceptance of an office of emolument under the Crown, 29 December 1921
Party	Candidate	Votes
Liberal	Daniel Duncan McKenzie	acclaimed

By-election on 31 July 1923 On Mr. McKenzie's acceptance of an office of emolument under the Crown, 11 April 1923
Party	Candidate	Votes
Liberal	Fenwick Lionel Kelly	4,839
Conservative	Robert Hamilton Butts	4,215
Labour	Daniel David MacDonald	1,652

=== Cape Breton North—Victoria, 1925–1935 ===
1925 Canadian federal election
Party	Candidate	Votes
Conservative	Lewis Wilkieson Johnstone	6,873
Liberal	Fenwick Lionel Kelly	4,309

1926 Canadian federal election
Party	Candidate	Votes
Conservative	Lewis Wilkieson Johnstone	6,284
Liberal	Michael Dwyer	4,691

1930 Canadian federal election
Party	Candidate	Votes
Conservative	Lewis Wilkieson Johnstone	7,075
Liberal	Michael Dwyer	5,184

=== Cape Breton North and Victoria, 1935–1968 ===
1935 Canadian federal election
Party	Candidate	Votes
Liberal	Daniel Alexander Cameron	6,457
Conservative	Lewis Wilkieson Johnstone	4,067
Reconstruction	John Donald Nelson MacDonald	3,377

By-election on 18 October 1937 On Mr. Cameron's death, 4 September 1937
Party	Candidate	Votes
Liberal	Matthew Maclean	acclaimed

1940 Canadian federal election
Party	Candidate	Votes
Liberal	Matthew Maclean	6,326
National Government	John Michael MacDonald	5,156
Co-operative Commonwealth	Robert Way	2,097

1945 Canadian federal election
Party	Candidate	Votes
Liberal	Matthew Maclean	5,895
Progressive Conservative	John Michael MacDonald	5,441
Co-operative Commonwealth	Robert Waye	2,886

1949 Canadian federal election
Party	Candidate	Votes
Liberal	Matthew Maclean	9,461
Progressive Conservative	Thomas Price Slaven	5,083
Co-operative Commonwealth	Sidney Oram	2,102

1953 Canadian federal election
Party	Candidate	Votes
Liberal	William Murdoch Buchanan	9,535
Progressive Conservative	John Norman MacAskill	6,218

1957 Canadian federal election
Party	Candidate	Votes
Progressive Conservative	Robert Muir	9,097
Liberal	William Murdoch Buchanan	8,717
Co-operative Commonwealth	Daniel Joseph MacEachern	1,753

1958 Canadian federal election
Party	Candidate	Votes
Progressive Conservative	Robert Muir	12,046
Liberal	William Murdock Buchanan	8,616

1962 Canadian federal election
Party	Candidate	Votes
Progressive Conservative	Robert Muir	11,019
Liberal	Malcolm A. Patterson	7,541
New Democratic	Gerald A. Yetman	3,403

1963 Canadian federal election
Party	Candidate	Votes
Progressive Conservative	Robert Muir	10,508
Liberal	Robert France Ferguson	8,507
New Democratic	Gerald A. Yetman	2,347

1965 Canadian federal election
Party	Candidate	Votes
Progressive Conservative	Robert Muir	11,258
Liberal	Robert France Ferguson	8,208
New Democratic	David M. Guy	1,868

== See also ==
- List of Canadian electoral districts
- Historical federal electoral districts of Canada
