= Christiane Gagnon =

Canadian politician

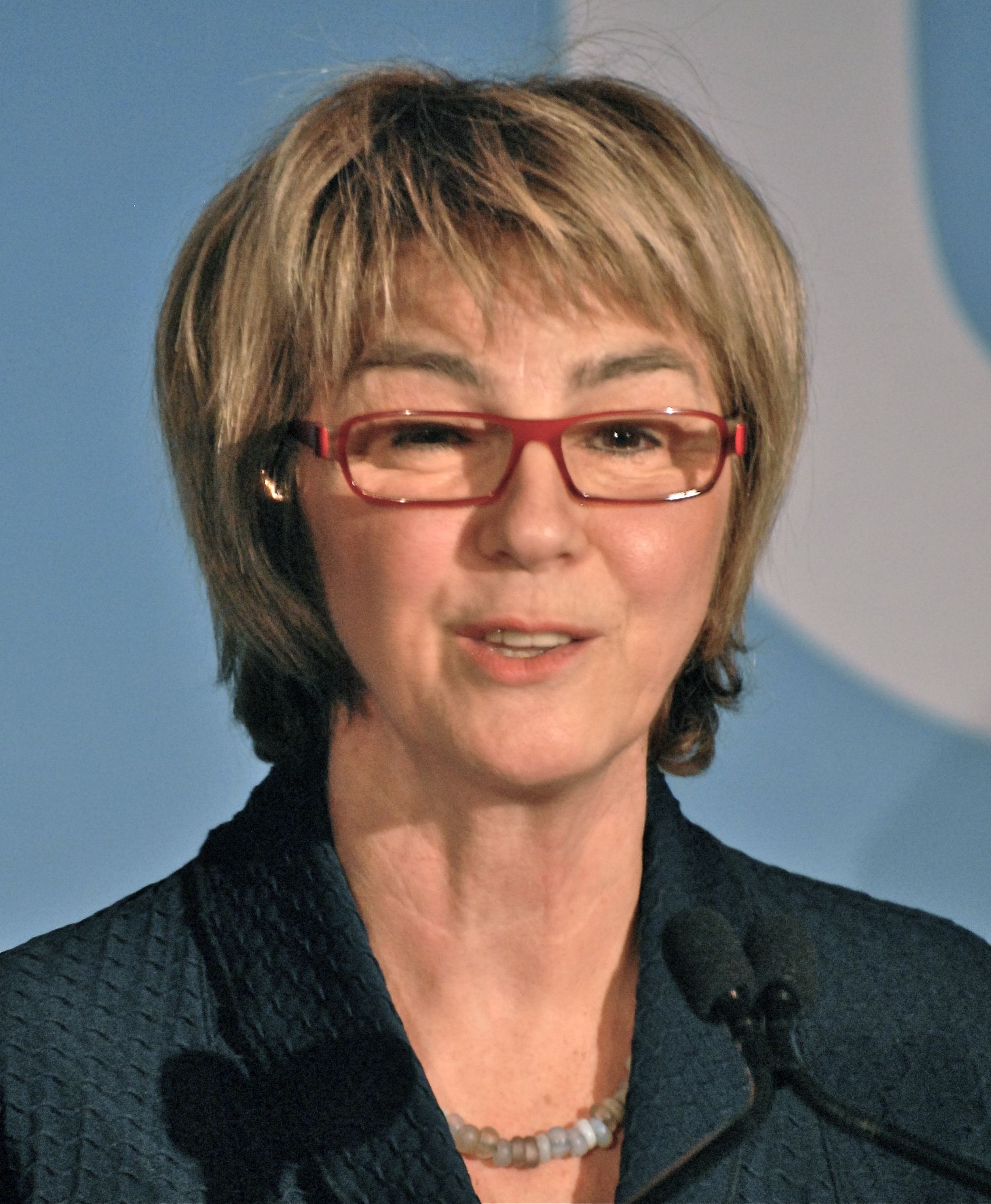
- Gagnon in 2011

Member of Parliament for Québec
- In office October 25, 1993 – May 2, 2011
- Preceded by: Gilles Loiselle
- Succeeded by: Annick Papillon

Personal details
- Born: April 16, 1948 (age 78) Chicoutimi, Quebec, Canada
- Party: Bloc Québécois
- Spouse: Michel Lemieux
- Profession: Real estate agent

Christiane Gagnon (born April 16, 1948) is a Canadian politician who served as the Member of Parliament (MP) for the electoral district of Québec from 1993 to 2011. She is a member of the Bloc Québécois (BQ).

== Early life ==
Gagnon was born in Chicoutimi, Quebec. She worked as a real estate agent.

== Tenure in Parliament ==
She was first elected to the House of Commons in the 1993 federal election as the Bloc Québécois candidate in the district of Québec. She was re-elected in the federal general elections of 1997, 2000, 2004, 2006 and 2008. She was defeated in the 2011 election by NDP candidate Annick Papillon.

She served as the Bloc's caucus chair from 1996 to 1998. She has also been the Bloc's critic of the Status of Women, the Federal Office of Regional Development-Quebec, Housing, Poverty, Canadian Heritage, the National Capital Commission, and the National Capital Region. She did not participate in the 2015 election. She was a candidate in the 2019 election, which she narrowly lost to the Liberal Party incumbent Jean-Yves Duclos.

== Electoral record ==
2019 Canadian federal election: Québec
Party	Candidate	Votes	%	±%	Expenditures
Liberal	Jean-Yves Duclos	18,047	33.3	+4.4	$80,667.63
Bloc Québécois	Christiane Gagnon	17,722	32.7	+13.85	none listed
Conservative	Bianca Boutin	8,118	15.0	-6.79	$38,447.35
New Democratic	Tommy Bureau	6,220	11.5	-15.54	$6,381.41
Green	Luc Joli-Coeur	2,949	5.4	+2.49	$9,773.82
People's	Bruno Dabiré	674	1.2	–	none listed
Rhinoceros	Sébastien CoRhino	347	0.6	–	none listed
Pour l'Indépendance du Québec	Luc Paquin	119	0.2	–	none listed
Total valid votes/expense limit		54,198	100.0		
Total rejected ballots		1,051			
Turnout		55,249	70.0		
Eligible voters		78,950			
Liberal hold		Swing		-1.3	
Source: Elections Canada

2011 Canadian federal election
Party	Candidate	Votes	%	±%	Expenditures
New Democratic	Annick Papillon	22,393	42.6	+30.8	
Bloc Québécois	Christiane Gagnon	14,684	28.0	-13.8	
Conservative	Pierre Morasse	9,330	17.8	-7.9	
Liberal	François Payeur	4,735	9.0	-8.5	
Green	Yvan Dutil	1,144	2.2	-1.1	
Christian Heritage	Stefan Jetchick	228	0.4	-	
Total valid votes/Expense limit		52,514	100.0		
Total rejected ballots		801	1.5	–	
Turnout		53,315	66.3	–	
Eligible voters		80,402	–	–	

2008 Canadian federal election
Party	Candidate	Votes	%	±%	Expenditures
Bloc Québécois	Christiane Gagnon	21,064	41.8	+0.2	$59,021
Conservative	Myriam Taschereau	12,943	25.7	-4.1	$70,315
Liberal	Damien Rousseau	8,845	17.5	+6.1	$13,132
New Democratic	Catheryn Roy-Goyette	5,933	11.8	+2.5	$6,186
Green	Yonnel Bonaventure	1,650	3.3	-1.6	
Total valid votes/Expense limit		50,435	100.00	$85,897	
Total rejected ballots		632	1.2		
Turnout		51,067	62.7		

2006 Canadian federal election
Party	Candidate	Votes	%	±%	Expenditures
Bloc Québécois	Christiane Gagnon	20,845	41.5	-9.1	$52,012
Conservative	Frédérik Boisvert	14,943	29.8	+18.7	$67,922
Liberal	Caroline Drolet	5,743	11.4	-15.5	$23,986
New Democratic	Michaël Lessard	4,629	9.2	+3.7	$5,287
Green	Yonnel Bonaventure	2,372	4.7	+0.5	
Independent	Dan Aubut	813	1.6	–	$100
Progressive Canadian	Alexandre Raymond-Labrie	520	1.0		$77
Libertarian	Francis Bedard	325	0.6	–	$0
Total valid votes/Expense limit		50,190	100.0	$80,394	

2004 Canadian federal election: Québec
Party	Candidate	Votes	%	Expenditures
Bloc Québécois	Christiane Gagnon	24,373	50.63	$51,839
Liberal	Jean-Philippe Côté	12,982	26.97	$72,065
Conservative	Pierre Gaudreault	5,330	11.07	$13,725
New Democratic	Jean-Marie Fiset	2,670	5.55	$518
Green	Antonine Yaccarini	2,046	4.25	$2,723
Marijuana	Pierre-Etienne Paradis	512	1.06	not listed
Marxist–Leninist	Jean Bédard	223	0.46	not listed
Total valid votes		48,136	100.00	
Total rejected ballots		1,040		
Turnout		49,176	60.77	
Electors on the lists		80,916		
Percentage change figures are factored for redistribution. Conservative Party percentages are contrasted with the combined Canadian Alliance and Progressive Conservative percentages from 2000. Sources: Official Results, Elections Canada and Financial Returns, Elections Canada.

2000 Canadian federal election
Party	Candidate	Votes	%	±%
Bloc Québécois	Christiane Gagnon	22,793	43.4	-1.1
Liberal	Claudette Tessier Couture	18,619	35.5	+3.1
Alliance	Michel Rivard	3,980	7.6	
Progressive Conservative	Marc Jalbert	3,171	6.0	-12.5
New Democratic	Jean-Marie Fiset	1,714	6.0	-12.5
Marijuana	Pierre-E. Paradis	1,480	2.8	
Natural Law	Gilles Rochette	482	0.9	
Marxist–Leninist	Claude Moreau	255	0.5	
Total valid votes		52,494	100.0	

1997 Canadian federal election
Party	Candidate	Votes	%	±%
Bloc Québécois	Christiane Gagnon	24,817	44.5	-9.2
Liberal	Claudette Tessier-Couture	18,062	32.4	+5.4
Progressive Conservative	Marc Jalbert	10,309	18.5	+4.8
New Democratic	Jean-Marie Fiset	2,556	4.6	+2.5
Total valid votes		55,744	100.0	

1993 Canadian federal election
Party	Candidate	Votes	%	±%
Bloc Québécois	Christiane Gagnon	27,788	53.7	
Liberal	Jean Pelletier	13,965	27.0	-1.2
Progressive Conservative	Gilles Loiselle	7,077	13.7	-33.0
New Democratic	Majella Desmeules	1,067	2.1	-18.0
Natural Law	Danielle Charland	883	1.7	
Green	Richard Domm	786	1.5	-2.1
Abolitionist	Ernst Fernandez	158	0.3	
Total valid votes		51,724	100.0	
