= Jacques Malouin =

Canadian politician

Jacques Malouin (February 1, 1826 – November 30, 1901) was a lawyer and political figure in Quebec. He represented Quebec-Centre in the House of Commons of Canada from 1877 to 1882 as an independent member.

He was born in Quebec City, Lower Canada, the son of François-Xavier Rinfret dit Malouin and Marguerite Falardeau. Malouin was admitted to the bar in 1847. He was married twice: to Marie-Angélique Suzor in 1852 and then to Alvine Morriset. Malouin was first elected to the House of Commons in an 1877 by-election held after Joseph-Édouard Cauchon was named Lieutenant-Governor of Manitoba. He was elected again in 1878 but was defeated by Joseph-Guillaume Bossé when he ran for reelection in 1882. Malouin was a member of the council of the Quebec bar and served as bâtonnier in 1869 and 1877. He died in Quebec City at the age of 75.

His son Arthur Cyrille Albert Malouin also represented Quebec-Centre in the House of Commons and later served in the Supreme Court of Canada.

== Electoral record ==
By-election on 3 November 1877
Party	Candidate	Votes
Independent	Jacques Malouin	acclaimed

1878 Canadian federal election: Quebec-Centre
Party	Candidate	Votes
Independent	Jacques Malouin	1,001
Conservative	James Gibb Ross	782

1882 Canadian federal election: Quebec-Centre
Party	Candidate	Votes
Conservative	Joseph-Guillaume Bossé	966
Independent	Jacques Malouin	855
