= William Murdoch Buchanan =

Canadian politician

Member of the Canadian Parliament for Cape Breton North and Victoria
- In office 1953–1957
- Preceded by: Matthew Maclean
- Succeeded by: Bob Muir

Personal details
- Born: November 30, 1897 North Sydney, Nova Scotia, Canada
- Died: September 5, 1966 (aged 68)
- Party: Liberal
- Occupation: dentist

William Murdoch Buchanan (November 30, 1897 - September 5, 1966) was a Canadian politician. Born in North Sydney, Nova Scotia, Buchanan was elected to the House of Commons of Canada in the 1953 election as a Member of the Liberal Party to represent the riding of Cape Breton North and Victoria. He was defeated in the elections of 1957 and 1958.
