= Annick Papillon =

Canadian politician

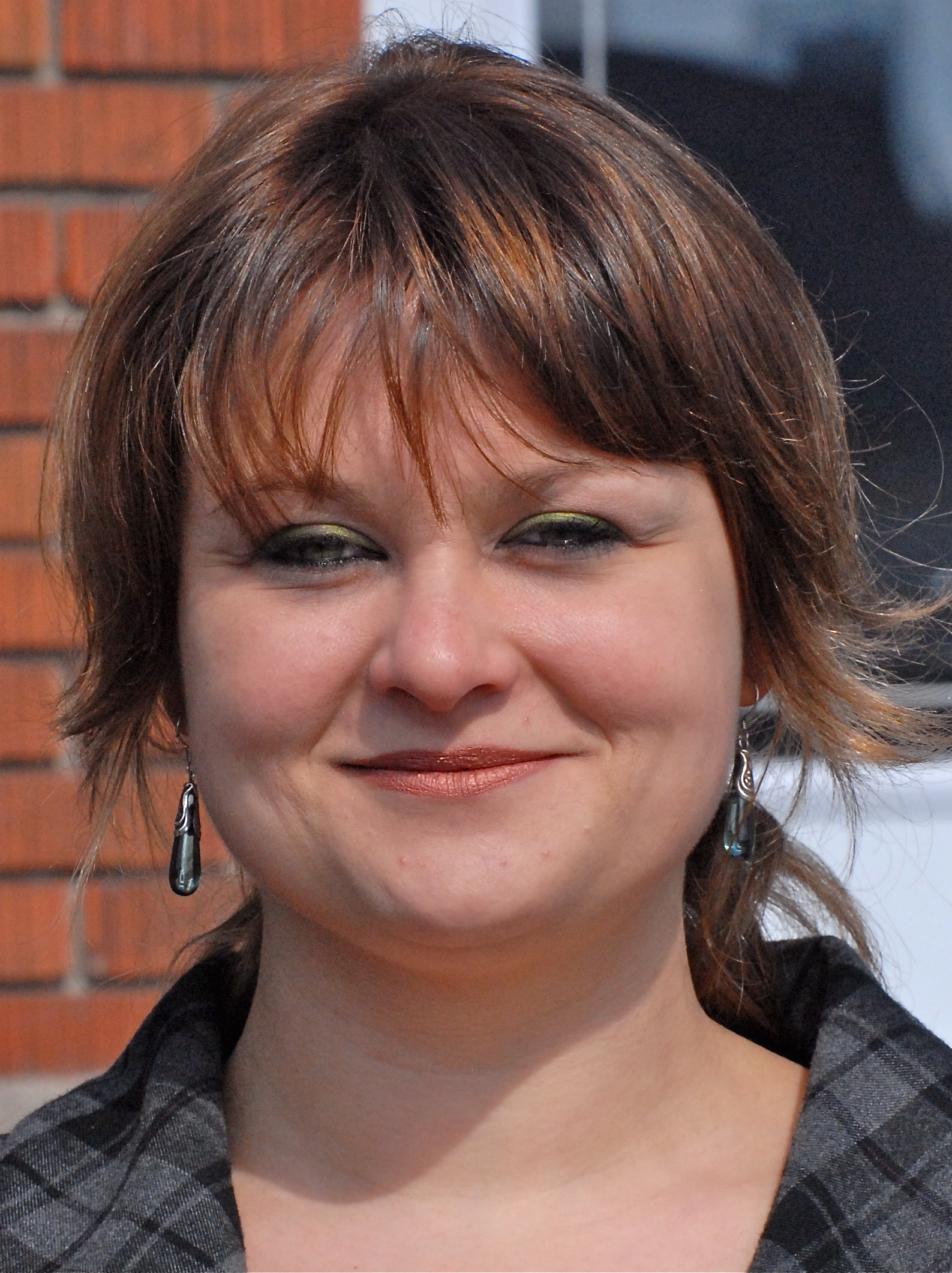

Member of Parliament for Québec
- In office May 30, 2011 – August 4, 2015
- Preceded by: Christiane Gagnon
- Succeeded by: Jean-Yves Duclos

Personal details
- Born: May 27, 1980 (age 46) Rimouski, Quebec, Canada
- Party: New Democratic

Annick Papillon (born May 27, 1980) is a Canadian politician, who served in the House of Commons of Canada from 2011 to 2015. She represented the electoral district of Québec as a member of the New Democratic Party.

== Biography ==
Papillon was born in Rimouski, Quebec, and grew up in Quebec City. She earned a BA in public communications, law, and history and pursued advanced studies in journalism at Université Laval. She specialized in international politics and field journalism while studying at the Université catholique de Louvain in Belgium, and performed an internship at Radio-Télévision belge de la Communauté francophone. Back in Quebec, she volunteered for humanitarian organizations. At the time of her election, she worked for the Institut de la statistique du Québec.

Running in her first campaign, she defeated incumbent Bloc Québécois MP Christiane Gagnon with a margin of 7,709 votes in the 2011 Canadian federal election. Owing largely to its unprecedented success in Quebec, where it won fifty-nine out of seventy-five seats, the NDP won Official Opposition status at the federal level for the first time in its history. Papillon was one of fifty-eight Quebec New Democrats elected for the first time in 2011.

She endorsed Tom Mulcair in the 2012 New Democratic Party leadership election.

In the 2015 election, Papillon lost her seat to Liberal Jean-Yves Duclos.
