= Joseph-Noël Bossé =

Canadian politician

The Honourable Joseph-Noël Bossé
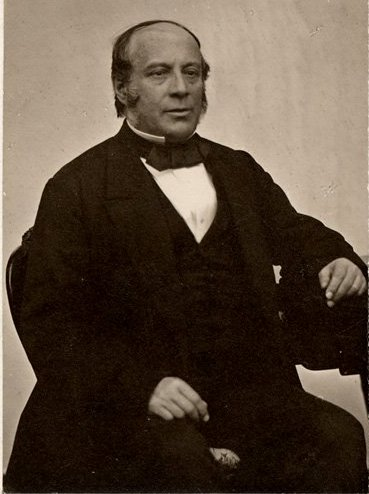

Canadian Senator from Quebec
- In office October 23, 1867 – January 23, 1868
- Appointed by: Royal Proclamation
- Succeeded by: Jean-Charles Chapais

Personal details
- Born: December 25, 1807 Cap-Saint-Ignace, Lower Canada
- Died: September 24, 1881 (aged 73) Quebec City, Quebec, Canada
- Party: Conservative
- Children: Joseph-Guillaume Bossé

Joseph-Noël Bossé, QC (December 25, 1807 – September 24, 1881) was a Quebec lawyer, judge and political figure. He was a Conservative Party of Canada member of the Senate of Canada for De la Durantaye division from 1867 to 1868.

He was born at Cap-Saint-Ignace, Lower Canada in 1806 and studied at the Petit Séminaire de Québec. He apprenticed in law with André-Rémi Hamel, was admitted to the bar in 1833 and set up practice in Quebec City. He served on the small claims court for the Îles de la Madeleine. He also prepared a report on the state of the fisheries in the Gulf of Saint Lawrence. Bossé was elected to the Legislative Council of the Province of Canada in an 1864 by-election held after the death of François-Xavier Lemieux and served until Confederation when he was named to the Senate. In 1867, he was named Queen's Counsel. Bossé also served as lieutenant-colonel of the local militia from 1863 to 1869. In 1868, he resigned his seat in the Senate when he was named puisne judge in the Quebec Superior Court.

He died at Quebec City in 1881.
