= Gilles Loiselle =

Canadian politician (1929–2022)

The Honourable Gilles Loiselle PC OQ

Minister of Finance
- In office 25 June 1993 – 3 November 1993
- Prime Minister: Kim Campbell
- Preceded by: Don Mazankowski
- Succeeded by: Paul Martin

President of the Treasury Board
- In office 20 September 1990 – 24 June 1993
- Prime Minister: Brian Mulroney
- Preceded by: Robert de Cotret
- Succeeded by: Jim Edwards

Member of Parliament for Langelier
- In office 21 November 1988 – 24 October 1993
- Preceded by: Michel Côté
- Succeeded by: Christiane Gagnon

Personal details
- Born: 20 May 1929 Ville-Marie, Quebec, Canada
- Died: 29 September 2022 (aged 93) Montreal, Quebec, Canada
- Party: Progressive Conservative
- Spouse: Lorraine Benoît (m. 1962)
- Children: 2
- Occupation: Diplomat; senior public servant; journalist; administrator

Gilles Loiselle (20 May 1929 – 29 September 2022) was a Canadian politician.

Loiselle was born in Ville-Marie, Quebec on 20 May 1929. He worked as the correspondent for CBC News in Paris for a decade before being appointed the government of Quebec's agent-general in the United Kingdom in 1977. He represented Quebec to the British government when the federal government of Canada was negotiating the Patriation of the Constitution of Canada from Britain in the 1980s.

After being elected to the House of Commons of Canada in the 1988 federal election, Loiselle joined the cabinet of Brian Mulroney. In 1990, he was elevated to the post of President of the Treasury Board and, in 1993, he served as Minister of Finance in the short-lived government of Kim Campbell.

Loiselle, a Progressive Conservative, was defeated in the 1993 election. The Tories were cut down to two seats, and Loiselle himself fell to third place in the vote count in his constituency.

He was named to the National Order of Quebec in 2011.

He died in Montreal on 29 September 2022, aged 93.

== Electoral record ==
1988 Canadian federal election: Langelier
Party	Candidate	Votes	%	±%
Progressive Conservative	Gilles Loiselle	24,555	46.65	
Liberal	Marielle Guay-Migneault	14,843	28.20	
New Democratic	Pauline Gingras	10,586	20.11	
Green	Gilles Fontaine	1,931	3.67	
Marxist–Leninist	France Tremblay	402	0.76	
Independent	Alexandre Roy	319	0.61	
Total valid votes		52,636	100.00	
Total rejected ballots		1,270		
Turnout		53,906	72.54	
Electors on the lists		74,312		

1993 Canadian federal election
Party	Candidate	Votes	%	±%
Bloc Québécois	Christiane Gagnon	27,788	53.7	
Liberal	Jean Pelletier	13,965	27.0	-1.2
Progressive Conservative	Gilles Loiselle	7,077	13.7	-33.0
New Democratic	Majella Desmeules	1,067	2.1	-18.0
Natural Law	Danielle Charland	883	1.7	
Green	Richard Domm	786	1.5	-2.1
Abolitionist	Ernst Fernandez	158	0.3	
Total valid votes		51,724	100.0	

25th Canadian Ministry (1993) – Cabinet of Kim Campbell
Cabinet post (1)
Predecessor	Office	Successor
Don Mazankowski	Minister of Finance; 1993	Paul Martin
24th Canadian Ministry (1984–1993) – Cabinet of Brian Mulroney
Cabinet post (1)
Predecessor	Office	Successor
Robert de Cotret	President of the Treasury Board; 1990–1993	Jim Edwards
Parliament of Canada
Preceded by Michel Côté, Progressive Conservative	Member of Parliament for Langelier; 1988-1993	Succeeded by Christiane Gagnon, B.Q.
