= Alexander Charles Ross =

Canadian politician

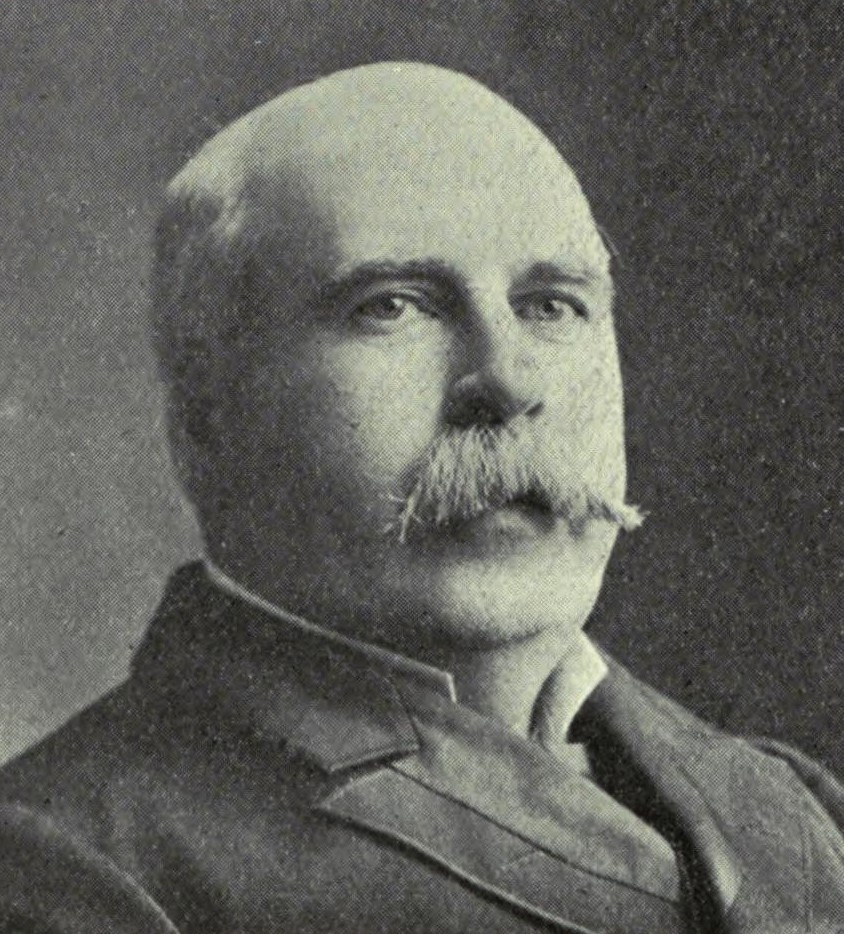

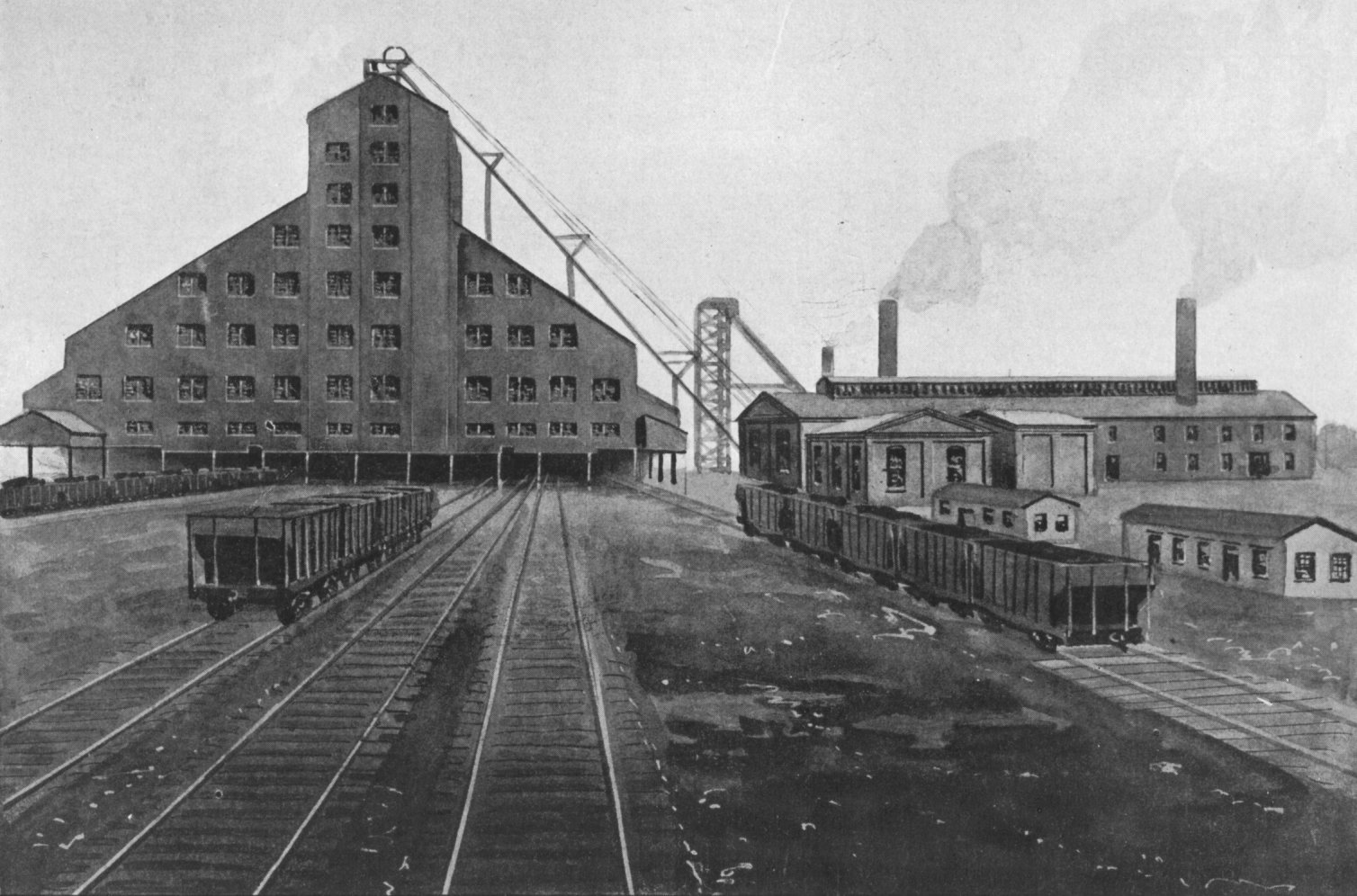
Alexander Charles Ross was involved in the founding of the Dominion Coal Co. in Cape Breton, Nova Scotia.

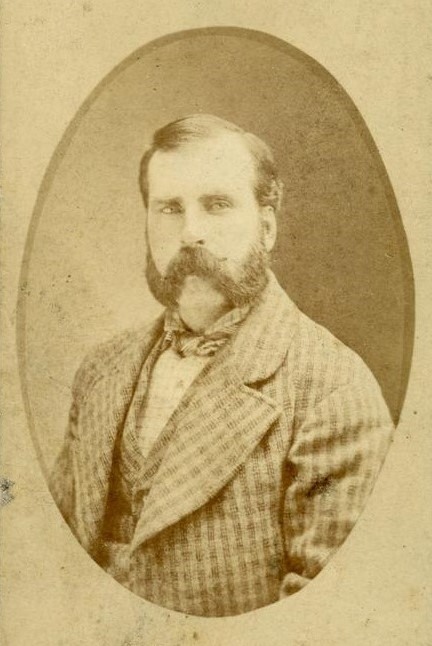
Alexander Charles Ross, between 1881 and 1901. Federal Liberal M.P. for North Cape Breton-Victoria, Nova Scotia, 1906–1908.

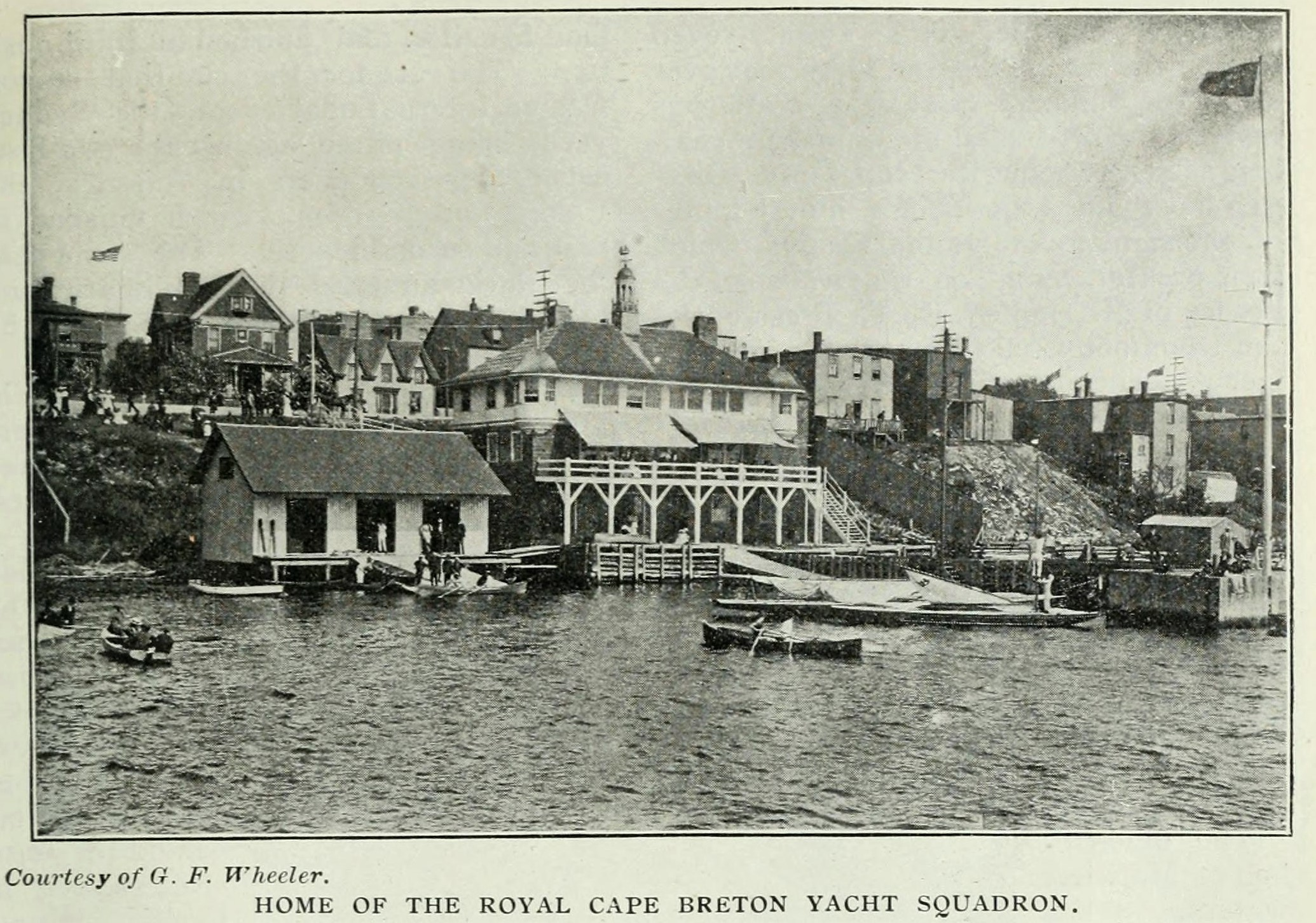
Alexander C. Ross was a charter member and early Commodore of the Royal Cape Breton Yacht Club, Sydney, Nova Scotia.

Alexander Charles Ross (May 29, 1847 – July 30, 1921) was a business executive and political figure from Nova Scotia, Canada. He represented North Cape Breton and Victoria in the House of Commons of Canada from 1906 to 1908 as a Liberal.

He was born in North Sydney, Nova Scotia, the son of Rev. Hugh E. Ross, of Scottish descent. In 1869, he married Marian Peters. Ross was party to the founding of the Dominion Steel Corporation, which merged with the Nova Scotia Steel Company to form the British Empire Steel Corporation (BESCO), ultimately becoming the Dominion Steel and Coal Corporation (DOSCO) in 1928. He was also president of the Sydney Cement Company.

As of 1891, he was Superintendent of the North Sydney Electric Light Co., which became part of the Cape Breton Electric Tramway & Power Co. in 1900, which was renamed the Cape Breton Electric Co. (CBE) in 1901. In the 20th century, his main occupation was listed in censuses as real estate, and he was once the largest owner of real estate in Sydney, Nova Scotia.

Ross was a charter member of the Royal Cape Breton Yacht Club, which was founded in 1899, and was an early Commodore of the club.

He was elected to the House of Commons in a 1906 by-election held after Daniel Duncan McKenzie was named a judge. On the day Ross first took his seat in the House of Commons in 1906, introduced by Prime Minister Sir Wilfrid Laurier, he was described in the Ottawa Journal thus: "The New Member is at once one of the striking figures of the Commons; tall, straight and dignified his appearance is imposing. His hair and moustache are silver grey, and his complexion ruddy.”

Ross lost the Liberal nomination for his riding to Judge McKenzie in 1908, and hence did not run for re-election.

During his time in office, Ross disagreed with the Liberal Party position regarding Maritime Intercolonial Railway running rights (i.e. opening the federally-owned line for use by privately owned railway companies, which Laurier did not support). He broke with the Liberal party in 1914 due to the same issue, switching his support to Sir Robert Borden's Conservatives, who did support running rights. He also disagreed with Laurier's stance on the issue of Reciprocity (i.e. free trade with the U.S.A.), which Laurier was for and Borden was against.
