= Daniel Alexander Cameron =

Canadian politician

Member of the Canadian Parliament for Cape Breton North and Victoria
- In office 1935–1937
- Preceded by: Lewis Wilkieson Johnstone
- Succeeded by: Matthew MacLean

Member of the Nova Scotia House of Assembly for Victoria County
- In office 1928–1930
- In office 1923–1925

Member of the Nova Scotia House of Assembly for Cape Breton
- In office 1916–1920

Member of the Legislative Council of Nova Scotia
- In office 1921–1923

Personal details
- Born: December 10, 1870 Sydney River, Nova Scotia
- Died: September 4, 1937 (aged 66)
- Party: Liberal

Daniel Alexander Cameron (December 10, 1870 – September 4, 1937) was a Canadian politician from the province of Nova Scotia. He was one of the first Nova Scotian legislators of the 20th century to die while in office.

== Early life and career ==
Born in Sydney River, Nova Scotia, the son of John and Isabella (Macdonald) Cameron, Cameron was educated at Sydney Academy and Dalhousie University where he received a Bachelor of Laws degree. He was admitted to the bar in October 1893. In 1894, he started practicing law in Sydney. He was a member of the County Council from 1900 to 1911. He was the stipendiary magistrate for Sydney from 1905 to 1911. In 1911, he was appointed treasurer and solicitor for the Municipality of Cape Breton.

== Political career ==
In 1916, he was elected to the Nova Scotia House of Assembly for the electoral district of Cape Breton. A Nova Scotia Liberal, he was defeated in 1920. From 1921 to 1923, he was a Member of the Legislative Council of Nova Scotia and was a Minister Without Portfolio in the cabinet of George Henry Murray. He resigned from the Legislative Council in 1923 and was elected to the House of Assembly for Victoria County. From 1923 to 1925, he was the Provincial Secretary in the cabinet of Ernest Howard Armstrong. He resigned in 1930 and was defeated in the 1930 federal election when he ran as the Liberal candidate for the electoral district of Cape Breton South. He was elected in the 1935 election for the electoral district of Cape Breton North and Victoria. He served for a little less than two years before he died in office in 1937.
