= Matthew MacLean =

Canadian politician

Member of Parliament for Cape Breton North and Victoria
- In office October 18, 1937 – April 7, 1953
- Preceded by: Daniel Alexander Cameron
- Succeeded by: William Murdoch Buchanan

Personal details
- Born: 13 December 1879; Sydney Mines, Nova Scotia, Canada
- Died: 7 April 1953 (aged 73); Ottawa, Ontario, Canada
- Political party: Liberal
- Spouse(s): Annie MacGregor Ross m. 15 June 1921
- Profession: insurance agent, notary

Matthew MacLean (13 December 1879 – 7 April 1953) was a Liberal party member of the House of Commons of Canada. He was born in Sydney Mines, Nova Scotia.

MacLean studied at Dalhousie Law School after graduating from high school in Sydney Mines. He became an insurance agent and notary during his career, and was a judge in Sydney Mines for more than 20 years.

He was first elected to Parliament at the Cape Breton North and Victoria riding in a by-election on 18 October 1937. MacLean was re-elected to full terms in 1940, 1945 and 1949. MacLean died on 7 April 1953 in Ottawa after an unspecified operation, just months before the 1953 election.
