= Lewis Wilkieson Johnstone =

Canadian politician (1862–1936)

Member of Parliament for Cape Breton North—Victoria
- In office October 1925 – October 1935
- Preceded by: Fenwick Lionel Kelly
- Succeeded by: Daniel Alexander Cameron

Personal details
- Born: Lewis Wilkieson Johnstone; 10 April 1862 Sydney, Nova Scotia
- Died: 9 March 1936 (aged 73)
- Party: Conservative
- Spouse(s): Annie Brown m. 16 June 1892
- Profession: physician, surgeon

Lewis Wilkieson Johnstone (10 April 1862 – 9 March 1936) was a Conservative member of the House of Commons of Canada. He was born in Sydney, Nova Scotia and became a physician and surgeon.

Johnstone was the grandson of Edmund Murray Dodd (1797–1876), who represented Sydney, Nova Scotia in the Nova Scotia House of Assembly and served as a Judge in the Supreme Court of Nova Scotia. He was also a descendant of David Mathews, the Loyalist Mayor of New York City under the British during the American Revolution. He was a descendant of the Schuyler family.

Johnstone attended King's College at Windsor, Nova Scotia, then in 1886 graduated in medicine from Bellevue Hospital Medical College. He became a municipal councillor and mayor of Sydney Mines.

He was first elected to Parliament at the Cape Breton North—Victoria riding in the 1925 general election then re-elected there in 1926 and 1930. Johnstone was defeated in the 1935 election by Daniel Alexander Cameron of the Liberal party.
