= James Gibb Ross =

Canadian politician

The Hon. James Gibb Ross
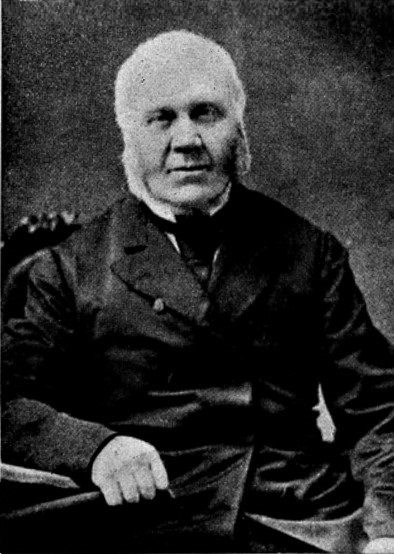

Senator for The Laurentides, Quebec
- In office 1884–1888
- Appointed by: John A. Macdonald
- Preceded by: David Edward Price
- Succeeded by: Evans John Price

Personal details
- Born: April 18, 1819 Carluke (Strathclyde), Scotland
- Died: October 1, 1888 (aged 69) Quebec City, Quebec, Canada
- Resting place: Mount Hermon Cemetery, Sillery, Quebec, Canada
- Party: Conservative

James Gibb Ross (18 April 1819 – 1 October 1888) was a Canadian merchant and politician from the province of Quebec.

Born in Carluke, a village of South Lanarkshire, Scotland, Ross emigrated to Canada in 1832 with his brother, John Ross, settling in Quebec City. After briefly attending a private school, he started working within his uncle's, James and Thomas Gibb, wholesale grocery business, James Gibb & Company. He eventually started his own business with his brother as a grocery importer and trading in lumber.

He twice ran unsuccessfully as the Conservative candidate for the House of Commons of Canada for the electoral district of Quebec-Centre in the 1872 and 1878 election. In 1884, he was summoned to the Senate of Canada for the senatorial division of The Laurentides, Quebec on the advice of Prime Minister John A. Macdonald. He served until his death in 1888. Ross was buried in Mount Hermon Cemetery in Sillery, on 4 October 1888.

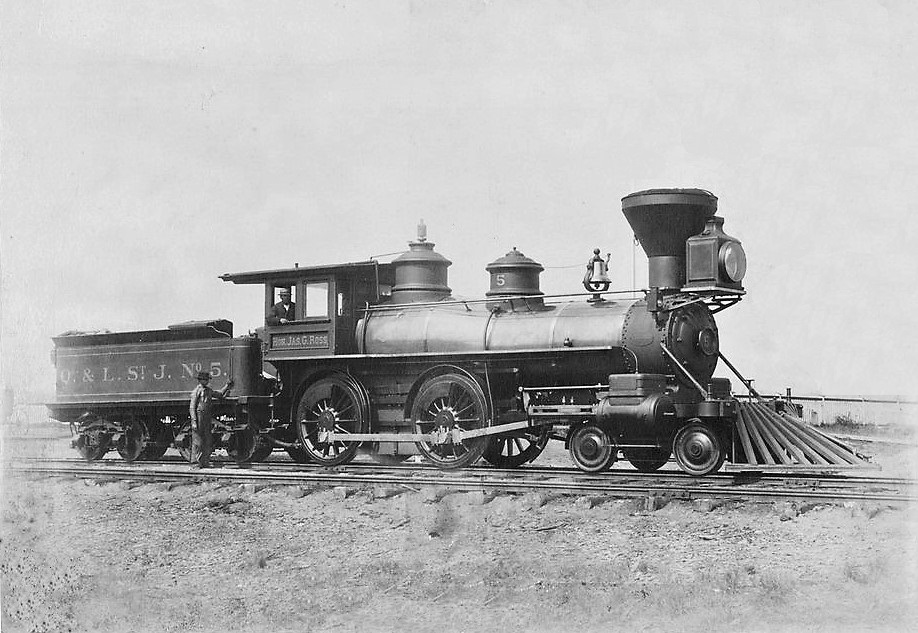
Quebec and Lake Saint-John Railroad Locomotive Number 5, named after Ross

1872 Canadian federal election: Quebec Centre/Québec-Centre
Party	Candidate	Votes
Independent	Joseph-Édouard Cauchon	964
Conservative	James Gibb Ross	694
Source: Canadian Elections Database

1874 Canadian federal election: Quebec-Centre
Party	Candidate	Votes
Liberal	Joseph-Édouard Cauchon	acclaimed
