= Joseph-Guillaume Bossé =

Canadian politician and lawyer

Joseph Guillaume Bossé
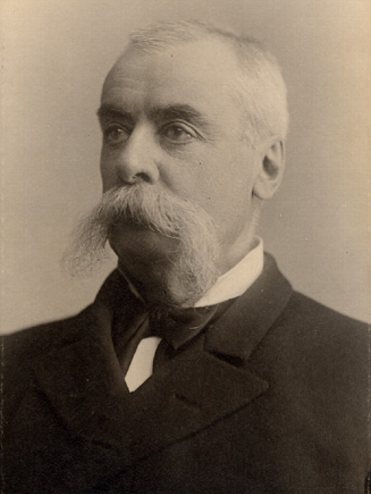

Member of the Canadian Parliament for Quebec-Centre
- In office 1882–1887
- Preceded by: Jacques Malouin
- Succeeded by: François Langelier

Personal details
- Born: August 4, 1843 Quebec, Canada East
- Died: September 7, 1908 (aged 65) Unknown
- Party: Conservative Party
- Occupation: lawyer

Joseph Guillaume Bossé (born August 4, 1843, in Quebec, Canada East-died September 7, 1908) was a politician and lawyer. He was elected to the House of Commons of Canada in 1882 as a Member of the Conservative Party to represent the riding of Quebec-Centre. His father was Senator Joseph-Noël Bossé (1807–1881).

1882 Canadian federal election: Quebec-Centre
Party	Candidate	Votes
Conservative	Joseph-Guillaume Bossé	966
Independent	Jacques Malouin	855
