= François Langelier =

Canadian politician (1838–1915)

Sir François Langelier KCMG FRSC
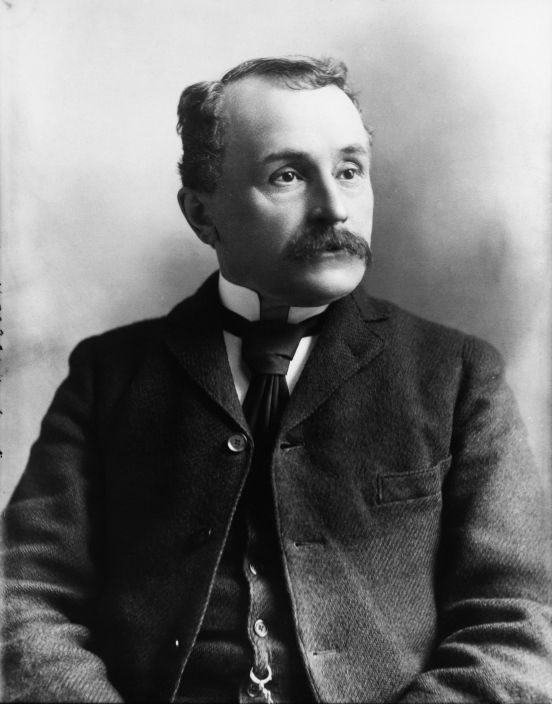

10th Lieutenant Governor of Quebec
- In office 5 May 1911 – 8 February 1915
- Monarch: George V
- Governors General: The Earl Grey; the Duke of Connaught and Strathearn
- Premier: Lomer Gouin
- Preceded by: Charles Alphonse Pantaléon Pelletier
- Succeeded by: Pierre-Évariste Leblanc

Member of the Canadian Parliament for Quebec-Centre
- In office 22 February 1887 – 13 January 1898
- Preceded by: Joseph-Guillaume Bossé
- Succeeded by: Arthur Cyrille Albert Malouin

Member of the Canadian Parliament for Mégantic
- In office 10 June 1884 – 22 February 1887
- Preceded by: Louis-Israël Côté dit Fréchette
- Succeeded by: Georges Turcot

Mayor of Quebec City
- In office 1882–1890
- Preceded by: Jean-Docile Brousseau
- Succeeded by: Jules-Joseph-Taschereau Frémont

Member of the Legislative Assembly of Quebec for Portneuf
- In office 1 May 1878 – 2 December 1881
- Preceded by: Praxède Larue
- Succeeded by: Jean-Docile Brousseau

Member of the Legislative Assembly of Quebec for Montmagny
- In office 16 December 1873 – 7 July 1875
- Preceded by: Télesphore Fournier
- Succeeded by: Auguste Charles Philippe Robert Landry

Personal details
- Born: 24 December 1838 Sainte-Rosalie, Lower Canada
- Died: 8 February 1915 (aged 76) Spencer Wood, Sillery, Quebec
- Party: Liberal
- Spouses: Virginie Légaré (m. 1864) Marie-Louise Braün (m. 1892)
- Relations: Charles Langelier, brother
- Children: 9 (3 of whom died young)
- Education: Université Laval; Université de Paris
- Occupation: lawyer, professor, journalist, author
- Profession: politician

Sir François Langelier, KCMG FRSC (24 December 1838 – 8 February 1915) was a Canadian lawyer, professor, journalist, politician, the tenth Lieutenant Governor of Quebec, and author. He was born in Sainte-Rosalie, Lower Canada (now Quebec) and died in Spencer Wood, Sillery, Quebec.

In 1871, he was an unsuccessful candidate to the Legislative Assembly of Quebec for the riding of Bagot. A Liberal, he was elected in an 1873 by-election for the riding of Montmagny. He was defeated in 1875 but was re-elected in 1878 for the riding of Portneuf. He was Commissioner of Crown Lands and Provincial Treasurer from 1878 to 1879. He was defeated in 1881. From 1880 to 1890, he was a municipal councillor in Quebec City and was mayor from 1882 to 1890.

He was elected to the House of Commons of Canada for Mégantic in an 1884 by-election, after the results for the 1882 election were declared void. He was re-elected for Quebec-Centre in the 1887, 1891, and 1896 elections. He resigned in 1898 when he was appointed a puisne judge of the Quebec Superior Court for the district of Montreal.

He was knighted in 1907 and was elected to the Royal Society of Canada in 1909. He was made a Knight of the Order of St John of Jerusalem in England in 1912 and a Knight Commander of the Order of St Michael and St George on 31 December 1913.

From 1911 to his death, he was the Lieutenant Governor of Quebec.

His brother Charles Langelier was also an MP from 1887 to 1890.

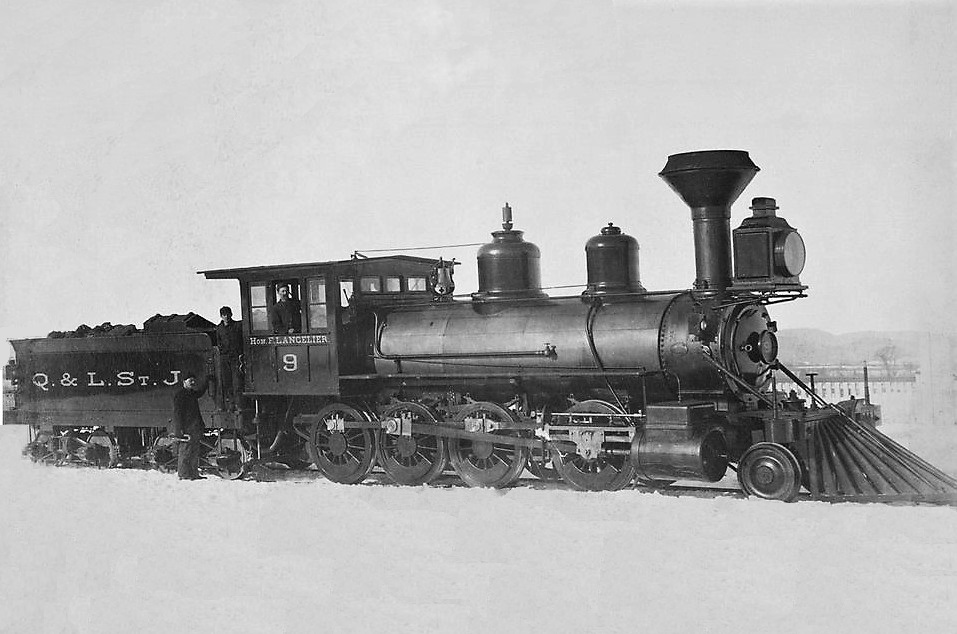
Quebec and Lake Saint-John Railroad Locomotive Number 9, Named for the Honorable François Langelier

== Electoral record ==
1887 Canadian federal election: Quebec-Centre
| Party | Candidate | Votes |
|---|---|---|
| Liberal | François Langelier | 1,331 |
| Conservative | L. F. Burroughs | 626 |

1891 Canadian federal election: Quebec-Centre
| Party | Candidate | Votes |
|---|---|---|
| Liberal | François Langelier | 1,080 |
| Conservative | Victor Chateauvert | 1,002 |

1896 Canadian federal election: Quebec-Centre
| Party | Candidate | Votes |
|---|---|---|
| Liberal | François Langelier | 1,469 |
| Conservative | A. R. Angers | 1,150 |
