= Georges-Honoré Simard =

Canadian politician

Member of the Canadian Parliament for Quebec-Centre
- In office 1867–1872
- Succeeded by: Joseph-Édouard Cauchon

Member of the Legislative Assembly of Quebec for Québec-Centre
- In office 1867–1871
- Succeeded by: Hector-Louis Langevin

Personal details
- Born: April 18, 1817 Quebec City, Lower Canada
- Died: June 27, 1873 (aged 56) Sainte-Foy, Quebec
- Party: Conservative

Georges-Honoré Simard (April 18, 1817 – June 27, 1873) was a Quebec businessman and political figure. He represented Quebec-Centre in the 1st Canadian Parliament as a Conservative member and the identically named provincial riding in the Legislative Assembly of Quebec from 1867 to 1871.

He was born in Quebec City in 1817 and educated there. He entered the hardware business with his uncle and then opened his own business. He later became the owner of the Quebec Plaster Mills. He also served as president or vice-president for several firms. Simard was elected to represent Quebec City in the Legislative Assembly of the Province of Canada in an 1856 by-election; he was reelected in 1857 and 1861 in Quebec-Centre. He supported the choice of Quebec City over Ottawa as a capital. In 1867, he was elected to both the federal and provincial legislatures; at the time, dual mandates were still allowed. He retired from politics after completing his terms in office.

Simard died in Sainte-Foy in 1873.

== Electoral record ==
1867 Canadian federal election: Quebec-Centre
Party	Candidate	Votes
Conservative	Georges-Honoré Simard	1,291
Unknown	P. Garneau	5
Unknown	Mr. Blanchet	2
Eligible voters		2,542
Source: Canadian Parliamentary Guide, 1871
