= Arthur Lachance =

Canadian politician (1868–1945)

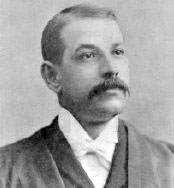

Member of the Canadian Parliament for Quebec-Centre
- In office 1905–1917
- Preceded by: Arthur Cyrille Albert Malouin
- Succeeded by: Electoral district was abolished in 1914.

Personal details
- Born: June 22, 1868 Quebec City, Quebec, Canada
- Died: March 1, 1945 (aged 76)
- Party: Liberal
- Spouse: Marie-Anne Routhier

Arthur Lachance (June 22, 1868 – March 1, 1945) was a Canadian politician and member of the Liberal Party who served as an MP for the riding of Quebec-Centre from 1905 to 1917.

Born in Quebec City, Quebec, Lachance was educated at the Christian Brothers' School, Quebec Seminary and Laval University. A crown attorney, crown prosecutor and lawyer, he was first elected to Parliament by acclamation in a 1905 by-election in the electoral district of Quebec-Centre after the current MP, Albert Malouin, was appointed a Puisne Judge of the Superior Court of Quebec, Arthabasca District. A Liberal, he was re-elected in 1908 and 1911.

By-election on 19 January 1905
Party	Candidate	Votes
Liberal	Arthur Lachance	acclaimed

1908 Canadian federal election: Quebec-Centre
Party	Candidate	Votes
Liberal	Arthur Lachance	2,049
Conservative	Hubert Cimon	1,135

1911 Canadian federal election: Quebec-Centre
Party	Candidate	Votes
Liberal	Arthur Lachance	2,122
Conservative	Jules Hone Jr.	1,529
