= Cape Breton—The Sydneys =

Former federal electoral district in Nova Scotia, Canada

Nova Scotia electoral district

Defunct federal electoral district
- Legislature: House of Commons
- District created: 1966
- District abolished: 1996
- First contested: 1968
- Last contested: 1993

Cape Breton—The Sydneys was a federal electoral district in Nova Scotia, Canada, that was represented in the House of Commons of Canada from 1968 to 1997.

This riding was created in 1966 from Cape Breton South. It consisted initially of part of the county of Cape Breton, including the city of Sydney. In 1987, it was redefined to consist of parts of the Counties of Inverness, Victoria and Cape Breton including the City of Sydney. It was abolished in 1996 when it was merged into Sydney—Victoria.

== Members of Parliament ==
This riding elected the following members of Parliament:

Parliament	Years	Member	Party
Cape Breton—The Sydneys; Riding created from Cape Breton South
28th	1968–1972	Robert Muir	Progressive Conservative
29th	1972–1974	Robert Muir	Progressive Conservative
30th	1974–1979	Robert Muir	Progressive Conservative
31st	1979–1980	Russell MacLellan	Liberal
32nd	1980–1984	Russell MacLellan	Liberal
33rd	1984–1988	Russell MacLellan	Liberal
34th	1988–1993	Russell MacLellan	Liberal
35th	1993–1997	Russell MacLellan	Liberal
Riding dissolved into Sydney—Victoria

== Election results ==
1968 Canadian federal election
Party	Candidate	Votes
Progressive Conservative	Robert Muir	14,971
Liberal	Vincent Morrison	10,543
New Democratic	Martin J. Merner	3,426

1972 Canadian federal election
Party	Candidate	Votes
Progressive Conservative	Robert Muir	15,394
Liberal	Mark Johnstone	9,529
New Democratic	Bill Mozvik	7,314

1974 Canadian federal election
Party	Candidate	Votes
Progressive Conservative	Robert Muir	14,373
Liberal	Russell MacLellan	12,622
New Democratic	Tom King	5,523

1979 Canadian federal election
Party	Candidate	Votes
Liberal	Russell MacLellan	12,857
Progressive Conservative	Joyce MacDougall	12,011
New Democratic	Ed Murphy	10,310
Marxist–Leninist	Glen Brown	128

1980 Canadian federal election
Party	Candidate	Votes
Liberal	Russell MacLellan	15,164
New Democratic	Ed Murphy	10,180
Progressive Conservative	Joyce MacDougall	9,191
Marxist–Leninist	Glen Brown	85

1984 Canadian federal election
Party	Candidate	Votes
Liberal	Russell MacLellan	16,051
Progressive Conservative	Joe Salter	13,658
New Democratic	Ed Murphy	6,673

1988 Canadian federal election
Party	Candidate	Votes
Liberal	Russell MacLellan	23,931
Progressive Conservative	David A. MacDonald	10,901
New Democratic	Ed MacLeod	2,999

1993 Canadian federal election
Party	Candidate	Votes
Liberal	Russell MacLellan	25,185
Progressive Conservative	Marlene Lovett	3,732
New Democratic	Robert Arthur Hawley	2,126
Reform	Keith Dingwall	1,907
Natural Law	Avard Mills	287

== See also ==
- List of Canadian electoral districts
- Historical federal electoral districts of Canada
