= Quebec-Centre (federal electoral district) =

Former federal electoral district in Quebec, Canada

Quebec electoral district

Defunct federal electoral district
- Legislature: House of Commons
- District created: 1867
- District abolished: 1914
- First contested: 1867
- Last contested: 1911

Quebec-Centre (French: Québec-Centre) was a federal electoral district in Quebec, Canada, that was represented in the House of Commons of Canada from 1867 to 1917.

It was created by the British North America Act, 1867. It consisted of Palace Ward, St. Louis Ward, St. John's Ward and the parts of Montcalm Ward and the Banlieue not included in Quebec West or Quebec East ridings. It was abolished in 1914 when it was redistributed into Quebec East and Quebec South ridings.

== Members of Parliament ==
This riding elected the following members of Parliament:

Parliament	Years	Member	Party
Quebec-Centre
1st	1867–1872	Georges-Honoré Simard	Conservative
2nd	1872–1874	Joseph-Édouard Cauchon	Independent
3rd	1874–1875	Joseph-Édouard Cauchon	Liberal
3rd	1875–1877	Joseph-Édouard Cauchon	Liberal
3rd	1877–1878	Jacques Malouin	Independent
4th	1878–1882	Jacques Malouin	Independent
5th	1882–1887	Joseph-Guillaume Bossé	Conservative
6th	1887–1891	François Langelier	Liberal
7th	1891–1896	François Langelier	Liberal
8th	1896–1898	François Langelier	Liberal
8th	1898–1900	Albert Malouin	Liberal
9th	1900–1904	Albert Malouin	Liberal
10th	1904–1905	Albert Malouin	Liberal
10th	1905–1908	Arthur Lachance	Liberal
11th	1908–1911	Arthur Lachance	Liberal
12th	1911–1917	Arthur Lachance	Liberal
Riding dissolved into Quebec East and Quebec South

== Election results ==
1867 Canadian federal election: Quebec-Centre
Party	Candidate	Votes
Conservative	Georges-Honoré Simard	1,291
Unknown	P. Garneau	5
Unknown	Mr. Blanchet	2
Eligible voters		2,542
Source: Canadian Parliamentary Guide, 1871

1872 Canadian federal election: Quebec Centre/Québec-Centre
Party	Candidate	Votes
Independent	Joseph-Édouard Cauchon	964
Conservative	James Gibb Ross	694
Source: Canadian Elections Database

1874 Canadian federal election: Quebec-Centre
Party	Candidate	Votes
Liberal	Joseph-Édouard Cauchon	acclaimed

By-election: On Mr. Cauchon being appointed President of the Privy Council, 7 December 1875

By-election on 27 December 1875
Party	Candidate	Votes
Liberal	Joseph-Édouard Cauchon	acclaimed

By-election: On Mr. Cauchon being appointed Lieutenant-Governor of Manitoba, 1877

By-election on 3 November 1877
Party	Candidate	Votes
Independent	Jacques Malouin	acclaimed

1878 Canadian federal election: Quebec-Centre
Party	Candidate	Votes
Independent	Jacques Malouin	1,001
Conservative	James Gibb Ross	782

1882 Canadian federal election: Quebec-Centre
Party	Candidate	Votes
Conservative	Joseph-Guillaume Bossé	966
Independent	Jacques Malouin	855

1887 Canadian federal election: Quebec-Centre
Party	Candidate	Votes
Liberal	François Langelier	1,331
Conservative	L. F. Burroughs	626

1891 Canadian federal election: Quebec-Centre
Party	Candidate	Votes
Liberal	François Langelier	1,080
Conservative	Victor Chateauvert	1,002

1896 Canadian federal election: Quebec-Centre
Party	Candidate	Votes
Liberal	François Langelier	1,469
Conservative	A. R. Angers	1,150

By-election: On Mr. Langelier being appointed judge, 14 January 1898

By-election on 24 January 1898
Party	Candidate	Votes
Liberal	Albert Malouin	acclaimed

1900 Canadian federal election: Quebec-Centre
Party	Candidate	Votes
Liberal	Albert Malouin	1,670
Conservative	Victor Chateauvert	1,155

1904 Canadian federal election: Quebec-Centre
Party	Candidate	Votes
Liberal	Albert Malouin	1,809
Liberal	Wm. Alex. Verge	1,012

By-election: On Mr. Malouin being appointed Puisne Judge of the Superior Court of Quebec, Arthabasca District, 7 January 1905

By-election on 19 January 1905
Party	Candidate	Votes
Liberal	Arthur Lachance	acclaimed

1908 Canadian federal election: Quebec-Centre
Party	Candidate	Votes
Liberal	Arthur Lachance	2,049
Conservative	Hubert Cimon	1,135

1911 Canadian federal election: Quebec-Centre
Party	Candidate	Votes
Liberal	Arthur Lachance	2,122
Conservative	Jules Hone Jr.	1,529

== See also ==
- List of Canadian electoral districts
- Historical federal electoral districts of Canada
