= Albert Malouin =

Canadian politician

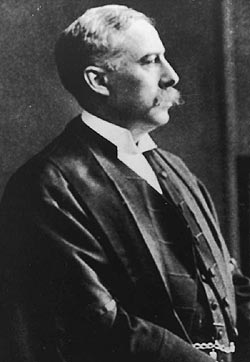

Member of the Canadian Parliament for Quebec-Centre
- In office 1898–1905
- Preceded by: François Langelier
- Succeeded by: Arthur Lachance

Puisne Justice of the Supreme Court of Canada
- In office January 30, 1924 – October 1, 1924
- Nominated by: William Lyon Mackenzie King
- Preceded by: Louis-Philippe Brodeur
- Succeeded by: Thibaudeau Rinfret

Personal details
- Born: March 13, 1857 Quebec City, Canada East
- Died: April 5, 1939 (aged 82)
- Party: Liberal
- Relations: Jacques Malouin, father

Arthur Cyrille Albert Malouin (March 13, 1857 – April 5, 1936) was a Canadian lawyer, politician, and Puisne Justice of the Supreme Court of Canada.

== Early life ==
Born in Quebec City, Canada East (now Quebec), the son of Jacques Malouin and Marie-Angélique Suzor, he received a Bachelor of Law degree from Université Laval in 1882. He was called to the Quebec Bar in 1882 and practised law in Quebec City.

He married Marie Louise Lavergne, the daughter of Senator Louis Lavergne.

In an 1898 by-election, he was acclaimed to the House of Commons of Canada as a Liberal for the riding of Quebec-Centre. He was re-elected in 1900 and 1904.

On January 7, 1905, he was appointed a Puisne Judge of the Quebec Superior Court, Arthabasca District, a role he served in until November 15, 1909.

== Justice of the Supreme Court of Canada ==
On January 30, 1924, Prime Minister Mackenzie King appointed Albert Malouin to replace Justice Louis-Philippe Brodeur, who had resigned to become the Lieutenant Governor of Quebec on October 9, 1923. Historians Snell and Vaughan describe his appointment as "the least thoughtful in the history of the [Court]." Malouin had not sought the position, was not informed until after the decision, and made clear to his colleagues that he had no interest in serving. He suffered from severe diabetes which he had nearly died from and was in poor health.

His appointment was recommended by Ernest Lapointe, over Justice Minister Lomer Gouin's preferred candidates, Thibaudeau Rinfret and Louis St. Laurent. Conservative Ferdinand Roy was also considered. Snell and Vaughan suggest Malouin's appointment reflected political infighting between Lapointe and Gouin. At the time, the Liberal government was experiencing a power struggle between conservative business interests that aligned with Gouin and liberal interests led by Lapointe, and the appointment was another aspect of that struggle.

Malouin's wife had written Mackenzie King earlier objecting to the possibility to a conservative like Roy being appointed to the Court, and while she did not advocate for her husband to take the role, she noted there were many good Liberals in Quebec who were deserving of the appointment.

Malouin resigned on September 30, 1924, after less than a year on the Court, the second shortest tenure in its history, and the shortest not ended by death. In his tenure on the Court, Malouin was largely inactive, participating in 27 reported cases, and writing short judgements in eight.

== Electoral record ==
By-election on 24 January 1898
Party	Candidate	Votes
Liberal	Albert Malouin	acclaimed

1900 Canadian federal election: Quebec-Centre
Party	Candidate	Votes
Liberal	Albert Malouin	1,670
Conservative	Victor Chateauvert	1,155

1904 Canadian federal election: Quebec-Centre
Party	Candidate	Votes
Liberal	Albert Malouin	1,809
Liberal	Wm. Alex. Verge	1,012
