= Daniel Duncan McKenzie =

Canadian politician

The Honourable Daniel Duncan McKenzie PC
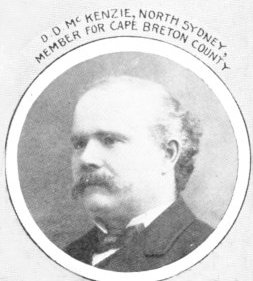

Leader of the Opposition
- In office February 17, 1919 – August 7, 1919
- Preceded by: Wilfrid Laurier
- Succeeded by: W. L. Mackenzie King

Interim Leader of the Liberal Party of Canada
- In office February 17, 1919 – August 7, 1919
- Preceded by: Wilfrid Laurier
- Succeeded by: W. L. Mackenzie King

Personal details
- Born: January 8, 1859 Lake Ainslie, Cape Breton, Nova Scotia
- Died: June 8, 1927 (aged 68) Halifax, Nova Scotia, Canada
- Party: Liberal
- Other political affiliations: Laurier Liberal
- Profession: Lawyer, judge

Daniel Duncan McKenzie, PC KC (January 8, 1859 – June 8, 1927) was a Canadian lawyer, judge, and politician.

== Life and career ==
Born in Lake Ainslie, Cape Breton, Nova Scotia, the son of Duncan and Jessie (McMillan) McKenzie, McKenzie was educated at the Public Schools and at the Sydney Academy. He became a barrister and attorney-at-law, practicing in North Sydney, Nova Scotia. He served was Commissioner of Schools for Cape Breton and was elected ten times to the Municipal Council of North Sydney, serving as Mayor for five years. He was elected to the Nova Scotia House of Assembly in 1900 as a Liberal, and again at the general elections of 1901.

He was first elected to the House of Commons of Canada for the electoral district of North Cape Breton and Victoria in the 1904 federal election. A Liberal, he resigned in 1906 when he was appointed a Judge of District No. 7, County Court of Nova Scotia. He retired in 1908 and was re-elected in the 1908 federal election. He was re-elected in 1911, 1917, and 1921.

He became interim leader of the Liberal Party of Canada in 1919, following the death of former Canadian Prime minister Sir Wilfrid Laurier on February 17, 1919. He held that position, and consequently the position of Leader of the Opposition, until August 7 of the same year, when the leadership of the party was won by Mackenzie King at the first Liberal leadership convention. McKenzie was also a candidate at that convention, placing fourth. He later served as Solicitor General during King's first term in office.

In 1923, he resigned his seat in the House of Commons after he was named a puisne judge in the Supreme Court of Nova Scotia. McKenzie served on the bench until his death at the age of 68 in Halifax, Nova Scotia.

Political offices
Preceded by Wilfrid Laurier	Leaders of the Liberal Party; Interim; 1919	Succeeded by William Lyon Mackenzie King
