= List of mayors in Canada =

This is an index of various lists of mayors of Canadian municipalities.

== Largest municipalities ==
Name	Picture	City	Province	Population (2021 Census)	Took office	Past political experience	Past officeholders
Olivia Chow		Toronto	Ontario	2,794,356	July 12, 2023	Metro Toronto Councillor for Ward 24 Downtown (1992–2000); City councillor for Ward 20 Trinity—Spadina (2000–2005); New Democratic Party MP for Trinity—Spadina (2006–2014); Candidate for mayor (2014)	List
Soraya Martinez Ferrada		Montreal	Quebec	1,762,949	November 13, 2025	City councillor for Saint-Michel (2005–2009); Liberal MP for Hochelaga (2019–2025); Leader of Ensemble Montréal	List
Jeromy Farkas		Calgary	Alberta	1,306,784	October 29, 2025	City councillor for Ward 11 (2017–2021)	List
Mark Sutcliffe		Ottawa	Ontario	1,017,449	November 15, 2022	None	List
Andrew Knack		Edmonton	Alberta	1,010,899	October 29, 2025	City councillor for Ward 1 (2013–2021); and for Nakota Isga (2021–2025)	List
Scott Gillingham		Winnipeg	Manitoba	749,607	November 1, 2022	City councillor for St. James Ward (2014-2022); Progressive Conservative candidate in the 2011 provincial election in St. James	List
Alvin Tedjo		Mississauga	Ontario	717,961	November 15, 2026	Ontario Liberal Party candidate in the 2018 provincial election in Oakville North—Burlington; Candidate in the 2020 Ontario Liberal Party leadership election City councillor for Ward 2 (2022–2026); Candidate for mayor (2024)	List
Pete Fry		Vancouver	British Columbia	662,248	November 2, 2026	Leader of the Green Party of Vancouver; Vancouver City Councillor (2018–2026); Green Party of British Columbia candidate in the 2016 Vancouver-Mount Pleasant provincial by-election	List
Patrick Brown		Brampton	Ontario	656,480	December 1, 2018	Barrie City Councillor (2000-2006); Conservative MP for Barrie (2006-2015); Leader of the Progressive Conservative Party of Ontario (2015-2018); Progressive Conservative MPP for Simcoe North (2015-2018)	List
Keanin Loomis		Hamilton	Ontario	569,353	November 15, 2026	Candidate for mayor (2022)	List
Doug McCallum		Surrey	British Columbia	568,322	November 2, 2026	Leader of Safe Surrey Coalition; Mayor of Surrey (1996–2005; 2018–2022); Surrey City Councillor (1993–1996)	List
Bruno Marchand		Quebec City	Quebec	549,459	November 14, 2021	Leader of Québec forte et fière	List
Andy Fillmore		Halifax	Nova Scotia	439,819	November 5, 2024	Liberal MP for Halifax (2015–2024)	List
Stéphane Boyer		Laval	Quebec	438,366	November 13, 2021	Mouvement Lavallois City councillor for Duvernay—Pont-Viau District (2013-2021); Leader of Mouvement Lavallois	List
Josh Morgan		London	Ontario	422,324	November 15, 2022	London City Councillor for Ward 7 (2014-2022)	List
Frank Scarpitti		Markham	Ontario	338,503	December 1, 2006	York Regional councillor (1985-1994); Liberal candidate for MPP in Markham (1990); Deputy Mayor of Markham (1991-1992; 1997-2006); Mayor of Markham (1992-1994)	List
Steven Del Duca		Vaughan	Ontario	323,103	November 15, 2022	Leader of the Ontario Liberal Party (2020-2022); Liberal MPP for Vaughan (2012-2018)	List
Maude Marquis-Bissonnette		Gatineau	Quebec	291,041	June 18, 2024	City councillor for Plateau District (2017–2021); Leader of Action Gatineau (2021; 2024–present)	List
Cynthia Block		Saskatoon	Saskatchewan	266,141	November 20, 2024	Liberal candidate for MP in Saskatoon—University (2015); City councillor for Ward 6 (2016–2024)	List
Berry Vrbanovic		Kitchener	Ontario	256,885	December 1, 2014	City councillor for Ward 2 (1994-2014); Liberal candidate for MPP in Kitchener Centre (1999)	List
Catherine Fournier		Longueuil	Quebec	254,483	November 14, 2021	Bloc Québécois candidate for MP in Montarville (2015); Parti Québécois (later, Independent) MNA for Marie-Victorin (2016-2021); Leader of Coalition Longueuil	List
Mike Hurley		Burnaby	British Columbia	249,125	November 5, 2018	None	
Fred Francis		Windsor	Ontario	229,660	November 15, 2026	City councillor for Ward 1 (2014-2026)	List
Chad Bachynski		Regina	Saskatchewan	226,404	November 18, 2024	None	List
Jeff Knoll		Oakville	Ontario	213,759	November 15, 2026	Ontario Progressive Conservative Party candidate for MPP in the 1990 provincial election in Etobicoke—Lakeshore; Town and regional councillor for Ward 5 (2000-2026)	List
Rob Howard		Richmond	British Columbia	209,937	November 2, 2026	Leader of Richmond Forward; British Columbia Liberal Party MLA for Richmond Centre (2009–2013); Richmond City Councillor (2001–2008)	
David West		Richmond Hill	Ontario	202,022	January 25, 2022	City councillor for Ward 4 (2013-2022)	
Marianne Meed Ward		Burlington	Ontario	186,948	December 1, 2018	Liberal candidate for MPP in Burlington (2007); City councillor for Ward 2 (2010-2018)	List
Tito-Dante Marimpietri		Oshawa	Ontario	175,383	November 15, 2026	Liberal candidate in the 2025 Canadian federal election in Oshawa; City councillor for Wards 2 & 4 (2003–2010); Durham Region councillor (2010–2014; 2018–2026)	List
Marie-Claude Bibeau		Sherbrooke	Quebec	172,950	November 12, 2025	Liberal MP for Compton—Stanstead (2015–2025)	List
Paul Lefebvre		Greater Sudbury	Ontario	166,004	November 15, 2022	Liberal MP for Sudbury (2015-2021)	List
Ross Siemens		Abbotsford	British Columbia	153,524	November 7, 2022	Abbotsford District Councillor (1986-1990); City councillor (2014-2022)	
Steven Blaney		Lévis	Quebec	149,683	November 10, 2025	ADQ candidate for MNA in Beauce-Nord (1998); Conservative MP for Lévis—Bellechasse (2006–2015) and for Bellechasse—Les Etchemins—Lévis (2015–2021); Leader of Prospérité Lévis	List
Craig Hodge		Coquitlam	British Columbia	148,625	November 9, 2026	City councillor (2011-2026)	
Alex Nuttall		Barrie	Ontario	147,829	November 15, 2022	City councillor for Ward 10 (2006-2014); Conservative MP for Barrie—Springwater—Oro-Medonte (2015-2019)	List
Luc Boivin		Saguenay	Quebec	144,723	November 18, 2025	City councillor for District 18 (2009-2017)	
Tom Dyas		Kelowna	British Columbia	144,576	November 7, 2022	Ran for mayor in 2018	
Leanne Caron		Guelph	Ontario	143,740	November 15, 2026	City councillor for Ward 5 (2006-2026)	List
Jean-François Aubin		Trois-Rivières	Quebec	139,163	November 13, 2025	City Councillor for Marie-de-l'Incarnation District (2013–2017); Ran for mayor in 2017 and 2019	List
Elizabeth Roy		Whitby	Ontario	138,501	November 15, 2022	Whitby Town Councillor for West Ward (2006-2014); Durham Regional Councillor (2014-present); Liberal candidate for MPP in Whitby—Oshawa (2011)	
Scott Hamilton		Cambridge	Ontario	138,479	November 15, 2026	City councillor for Ward 7 (2020-2026)	List
Mat Siscoe		St. Catharines	Ontario	136,803	November 15, 2022	City councillor for St. Patrick's Ward (2010-2021); Niagara Regional Councillor (2021-present); Progressive Conservative candidate for MPP in St. Catharines (2014)	List
George Minakakis		Milton	Ontario	132,979	November 15, 2026	Town councillor for Ward 1 (2025–2026)	
Jay Lundgren		Langley (DM)	British Columbia	132,603	November 2, 2026	Leader of Langley Strong	List
Conny Glenn		Kingston	Ontario	132,485	November 15, 2026	City councillor for Sydenham District (2022–2026)	List
Marilyn Crawford		Ajax	Ontario	126,666	November 15, 2026	Town Councillor for Ward 1 (2010–2018); Durham Regional Councillor for Ward 1 (2018–2026)	
Shannon Weber		Waterloo	Ontario	121,436	November 15, 2026	Ran for mayor (2022)	List
Mathieu Traversy		Terrebonne	Quebec	119,944	November 15, 2021	Parti Québécois MNA for Terrebonne (2008-2018); Leader of Mouvement Terrebonne	
Rishi Sharma		Saanich	British Columbia	117,735	November 2, 2026	Leader of Save Our Saanich; British Columbia Liberal Party candidate in Saanich South in the 2020 provincial election Ran for District council in 2018 and 2022	
Danny Breen		St. John's	Newfoundland and Labrador	110,525	October 10, 2017	City councillor for Ward 1 (2009-2017); Progressive Conservative candidate for MHA in Virginia Waters (2014 by-election)	List
Moe Comuzzi		Thunder Bay	Ontario	108,843	November 15, 2026	Conservative candidate in the 2011 and 2015 Canadian federal elections in Thunder Bay—Rainy River	List
Melissa Granum		Delta	British Columbia	108,455	November 2, 2026	Leader of Delta First	
Richard Carpenter		Brantford	Ontario	104,688	November 15, 2026	Brantford Public Utilities Commissioner for Ward 4 (1990–1994); Brantford city councillor for Ward 4 (1994–2026)	List
Michael Bondy		Chatham-Kent	Ontario	103,988	November 15, 2026	Municipal councillor for Ward 6 – Chatham (2010–2026)	
Tom Dingwall		Clarington	Ontario	101,427	November 15, 2026	Ran for Durham Region Chair (2018); Conservative candidate in the 2019 Canadian federal election in Ajax; Ran for mayor (2022)	List
Cindy Jefferies		Red Deer	Alberta	100,844	November 3, 2025	City councillor (2004–2013; 2021–2025)	List
Leonard Krog		Nanaimo	British Columbia	99,863	November 5, 2018	New Democratic Party MLA for Parksville-Qualicum (1991-1996); New Democratic Party MLA for Nanaimo (2005-2018)	
Rod Frank		Strathcona County	Alberta	99,225	October 24, 2017	Liberal candidate for MP in Sherwood Park—Fort Saskatchewan (2015)	
Kevin Ashe		Pickering	Ontario	99,186	November 15, 2022	City councillor for Ward 1 (2003-2007; 2010-2015); Durham Regional Councillor (2015-2022); Progressive Conservative candidate for MPP in Ajax—Pickering (2007)	List
Blaine Hyggen		Lethbridge	Alberta	98,406	October 25, 2021	Lethbridge City Councillor (2013-2021)	List
Mike O'Reilly		Kamloops	British Columbia	97,902	November 2, 2026	Kamloops City Councillor (2018–2026)	
Éric Latour		Saint-Jean-sur-Richelieu	Quebec	97,873	November 10, 2025	Leader of Coalition Éric Latour	
Lori Lococo		Niagara Falls	Ontario	94,415	November 15, 2026	City councillor (2018–2026)	List
Cecil Clarke		Cape Breton Regional Municipality	Nova Scotia	93,694	October 30, 2024	Progressive Conservative MLA for Cape Breton North (2001–2011); Conservative candidate for Sydney–Victoria in the 2011 Canadian federal election Mayor of Cape Breton Regional Municipality (2012–2020)	List
Jason Lum		Chilliwack	British Columbia	93,203	November 3, 2026	Chilliwack City Councillor (2011–2026); Independent candidate for Chilliwack-Kent in the 2020 provincial election	
Marianne Alto		Victoria	British Columbia	91,867	November 3, 2022	Victoria City Councillor (2010–2022)	List
Doreen Assaad		Brossard	Quebec	91,525	November 13, 2017	Brossard City Councillor for District 1 (2009–2013) and District 9 (2013–2017); Leader of Together Brossard	
Jerry Kok		Maple Ridge	British Columbia	90,990	November 3, 2026	None	
Mike Little		North Vancouver (district municipality)	British Columbia	88,168	November 6, 2018	North Vancouver District Councillor (2005–2014); Conservative candidate for MP in the 2015 Canadian federal election in Burnaby North—Seymour	

== By city ==
=== B ===
- Barrie (Ontario)
- Bedford (Nova Scotia)
- Brampton (Ontario)
- Brandon (Manitoba)
- Brantford (Ontario)

=== C ===
- Caledon (Ontario)
- Calgary (Alberta)
- Cambridge (Ontario)
- Cape Breton Regional Municipality (Nova Scotia)
- Charlottetown (Prince Edward Island)
- Clarington (Ontario)

=== D ===
- Dartmouth (Nova Scotia)
- Drummondville (Quebec)

=== E ===
- East York (Ontario)
- Edmonton (Alberta)
- Etobicoke (Ontario)

=== F ===
- Fort Frances (Ontario)
- Fort Saskatchewan (Alberta)
- Fredericton (New Brunswick)

=== G ===
- Gander (Newfoundland and Labrador)
- Gatineau (Quebec)
- Guelph (Ontario)

=== H ===
- Halifax (Nova Scotia)
- Halifax Regional Municipality (Nova Scotia)
- Hamilton (Ontario)
- Houston (British Columbia)

=== K ===
- Kenora (Ontario)
- Kingston (Ontario)
- Kitchener (Ontario)

=== L ===
- Langley District Municipality (British Columbia)
- Lethbridge (Alberta)
- Lévis (Quebec)
- London (Ontario)
- Longueuil (Quebec)
- Lunenburg (Nova Scotia)

=== M ===
- Markham (Ontario)
- Medicine Hat (Alberta)
- Mississauga (Ontario)
- Moncton (New Brunswick)
- Montreal (Quebec)
- Moose Jaw (Saskatchewan)

=== N ===
- New Westminster (British Columbia)
- Newmarket (Ontario)
- Niagara Falls (Ontario)
- North Bay (Ontario)

=== O ===
- Oakville (Ontario)
- Oshawa (Ontario)
- Ottawa (Ontario)

=== P ===
- Penticton (British Columbia)
- Peterborough (Ontario)
- Pickering (Ontario)

=== Q ===
- Qualicum Beach (British Columbia)
- Quebec City (Quebec)

=== R ===
- Red Deer (Alberta)
- Regina (Saskatchewan)

=== S ===
- St. Albert (Alberta)
- St. Catharines (Ontario)
- Saint John (New Brunswick)
- St. John's (Newfoundland and Labrador)
- Saint-Sauveur (Quebec)
- St. Thomas (Ontario)
- Saskatoon (Saskatchewan)
- Sault Ste. Marie (Ontario)
- Scarborough (Ontario)
- Shawinigan (Quebec)
- Sherbrooke (Quebec)
- Strathcona (Alberta, former)
- Sudbury (Ontario)
- Surrey (British Columbia)

=== T ===
- Thunder Bay (Ontario)
- Timmins (Ontario)
- Toronto (Ontario)
- Trois-Rivières (Quebec)

=== V ===
- Vancouver (British Columbia)
- Victoria (British Columbia)

=== W ===
- Waterloo (Ontario)
- Welland (Ontario)
- Whitchurch–Stouffville (Ontario)
- Whitehorse (Yukon)
- White Rock (British Columbia)
- Windsor (Ontario)
- Winnipeg (Manitoba)
- Woodstock (New Brunswick)

=== Y ===
- Yellowknife (Northwest Territories)
