= Guay =

Guay is a surname. Notable people with the surname include:

- Albert Guay (1917–1951), Canadian mass murderer
- Annie Guay (born 1985), Canadian ice hockey player
- Claude Guay, Canadian politician
- Erik Guay (born 1981), Canadian alpine ski racer
- Florian Guay, Canadian politician from Quebec
- François Guay (born 1968), ice hockey player
- Gabriel Guay (1848–1923), French painter
- Jacob Guay (born 1999), Canadian young singer
- Joseph-Philippe Guay (1915–2001), Canadian politician
- Lucie Guay (born 1958), Canadian sprint kayaker
- Monique Guay (born 1959), Quebec politician
- Paul Guay (born 1963), American ice hockey player
- Pierre Malcom Guay (1848–1899), physician, surgeon and political figure in Quebec
- Raynald Guay (1933–2017), Canadian politician
- Rebecca Guay, watercolor artist and illustrator
- Richard Guay (disambiguation), multiple people
- Tom Guay (born 1965), guitar player who joined White Zombie
