= Lévis City Council =

Lévis City Council is the governing body in the mayor–council government in the city of Lévis, Quebec in the Chaudière-Appalaches region. It is composed of the mayor and 15 councillors.

== Current Lévis City Council ==
As of the 2025 Lévis municipal election

Name	Party	District	Borough
Steven Blaney	Prospérité Lévis	Mayor	—
Anthony Dufour	Repensons Lévis	Saint-Étienne (1)	Les Chutes-de-la-Chaudière-Ouest
Isabelle Lefebvre	Repensons Lévis	Saint-Nicolas (2)	Les Chutes-de-la-Chaudière-Ouest
Audrey Bédard	Repensons Lévis	Villieu (3)	Les Chutes-de-la-Chaudière-Ouest
Benoit Forget-Chiasson	Lévis Force 10	Saint-Rédempteur (4)	Les Chutes-de-la-Chaudière-Ouest
Daniel Saindon	Prospérité Lévis	Charny (5)	Les Chutes-de-la-Chaudière-Est
Karine Lavertu	Lévis Force 10	Breakeyville (6)	Les Chutes-de-la-Chaudière-Est
Alain Quirion	Prospérité Lévis	Saint-Jean (7)	Les Chutes-de-la-Chaudière-Est
Erik Bilodeau	Prospérité Lévis	Taniata (8)	Les Chutes-de-la-Chaudière-Est
Anick Tremblay	Prospérité Lévis	Saint-Romuald (9)	Les Chutes-de-la-Chaudière-Est
Anne-Marie Tremblay	Prospérité Lévis	Notre-Dame District (10)	Desjardins
Jean Demers	Prospérité Lévis	Saint-David (11)	Desjardins
Jean Leblond	Prospérité Lévis	Christ-Roi (12)	Desjardins
Olivier Biron	Prospérité Lévis	Bienville (13)	Desjardins
Mélanie Sicotte	Prospérité Lévis	Lauzon (14)	Desjardins
Éric Nadeau	Repensons Lévis	Pintendre (15)	Desjardins
