= Joseph-Aurélien Roy =

Canadian politician

Joseph-Aurélien Roy (23 July 1910 – 27 December 2001) was a Canadian businessman and political figure. He represented Lévis in the House of Commons of Canada as a Social Credit member from 1962 to 1963 and in the Quebec National Assembly from 1970 to 1973 as a member of the Ralliement créditiste.

He was born in Beaumont, Quebec in 1910, the son of farmer Lauréat Roy, and studied at Saint-Étienne-de-Beaumont. He worked on the family farm and then purchased his own farm in 1933. In 1934, he married Marie-Alice Turgeon. Roy moved to Lauzon in 1943, where he worked with a shipbuilding company, later becoming a salesperson with another company. He opened his own hardware business in 1946 and then a construction company in 1951. Roy was also a member of the Saint-Jean-Baptiste Society. He served on the city council from 1952 to 1967. He was elected to the House of Commons in 1962 but was defeated in the election held the following year. Roy was elected in Levis to the Quebec assembly in 1970 but defeated in 1973.

He died at Lévis in 2001.

Parliament of Canada
Preceded by Maurice Bourget	Member of Parliament for Lévis; 1962-1963	Succeeded by Raynald Guay
National Assembly of Quebec
Preceded by Jean-Marie Morin (Union Nationale)	MNA for Lévis; 1970–1973	Succeeded by Vincent-François Chagnon (Liberal)
