= Antoine Dubé =

Canadian politician

Member of Parliament for Lévis-et-Chutes-de-la-Chaudière
- In office 25 October 1993 – 17 March 2003
- Preceded by: Gabriel Fontaine
- Succeeded by: Christian Jobin

Personal details
- Born: 15 May 1947 (age 78) Sainte-Rita, Quebec, Canada

Antoine Dubé (born 15 May 1947) was a member of the House of Commons of Canada from 1993 to 2003. Born in Sainte-Rita, Quebec, Dubé has worked in administration and recreation.

In 1984, he unsuccessfully sought a seat in federal parliament with the Parti nationaliste du Québec.

Dubé was elected in the Lévis electoral district under the Bloc Québécois party in the 1993, 1997 and 2000 elections, serving in the 35th, 36th and 37th Canadian Parliaments respectively. The riding was renamed Lévis-et-Chutes-de-la-Chaudière in 1998, during his second term of federal office.

Dubé left federal office on 17 March 2003 to seek the seat of Chutes-de-la-Chaudière in that year's provincial election with the Parti Québécois, but lost to Marc Picard.

In 2013, Dubé was elected leader of the newly formed municipal party Renouveau Lévis with 53% of the vote in a leadership convention, positioning him to run in the Lévis mayoral election. He ultimately lost the election to Gilles Lehouillier of the Force 10 party.

In the 2015 Canadian federal election, Dubé sought election in Bellechasse—Les Etchemins—Lévis as a candidate of the Bloc Québécois. The seat was held by the Conservative Party's Steven Blaney. He finished 4th with 11.53% of the vote behind Blaney, who was re-elected.

== Electoral record ==
1984 Canadian federal election: Lévis
| Party | Candidate | Votes |
|---|---|---|
| Progressive Conservative | Gabriel Fontaine | 32,338 |
| Liberal | Gaston Gourde | 17,283 |
| New Democratic | Jean-Paul Harney | 12,076 |
| Parti nationaliste | Antoine Dubé | 1,649 |
| Rhinoceros | Raymond Emiliano Marquis | 1,630 |
| Social Credit | Jean-Paul Rhéaume | 216 |

1993 Canadian federal election: Lévis
| Party | Candidate | Votes |
|---|---|---|
| Bloc Québécois | Antoine Dubé | 40,184 |
| Liberal | Jean-Marc Gagnon | 14,254 |
| Progressive Conservative | Serge Léveillé | 9,163 |
| New Democratic | Marie-France Renaud | 1,182 |
| Abolitionist | Carole Carrier | 705 |

1997 Canadian federal election: Lévis
| Party | Candidate | Votes |
|---|---|---|
| Bloc Québécois | Antoine Dubé | 27,870 |
| Liberal | Jocelyne Gosselin | 17,256 |
| Progressive Conservative | Thérèse Boucher | 14,630 |
| New Democratic | France Michaud | 1,881 |

2000 Canadian federal election: Lévis-et-Chutes-de-la-Chaudière
| Party | Candidate | Votes |
|---|---|---|
| Bloc Québécois | Antoine Dubé | 26,398 |
| Liberal | Shirley Baril | 21,522 |
| Alliance | Jacques Bergeron | 9,152 |
| Progressive Conservative | Réal St-Laurent | 4,222 |
| New Democratic | France Michaud | 1,411 |
| Communist | André Cloutier | 374 |
