= Louis Demers =

Louis Demers may refer to:

- Louis Philippe Demers (1863–1951), Canadian lawyer, professor, and politician
- Louis Julien Demers (1848–1905), merchant and political figure in Quebec
