= Joseph-Étienne Dussault =

Canadian politician

Member of Parliament for Lévis
- In office October 1925 – July 1930
- Preceded by: Joseph-Boutin Bourassa
- Succeeded by: Émile Fortin

Member of Parliament for Lévis
- In office October 1935 – January 1940
- Preceded by: Émile Fortin
- Succeeded by: Maurice Bourget

Personal details
- Born: 17 October 1884 Lévis, Quebec, Canada
- Died: 25 December 1943 (aged 59)
- Party: Liberal
- Spouse(s): Jeannette Belleau m. 8 June 1908
- Profession: contractor, editor, industrialist

Joseph-Étienne Dussault (17 October 1884 – 25 December 1943) was a Liberal party member of the House of Commons of Canada. He was born in Lévis, Quebec and became a contractor, editor and industrialist.

Dussault was educated at the Quebec Seminary. He was a municipal politician, a councillor for Lévis, Quebec from 1911 to 1919.

He was first elected to Parliament at the Lévis riding in the 1925 general election and re-elected in 1926. Dussault was defeated in the 1930 election by Émile Fortin of the Conservative party, but won the seat back in the 1935 election. After completing the term of the 18th Canadian Parliament, Dussault did not seek another term in the 1940 election.

1925 Canadian federal election: Lévis
| Party | Candidate | Votes |
|---|---|---|
| Liberal | Joseph-Étienne Dussault | 7,192 |
| Conservative | L. Gédéon Gravel | 4,899 |

1926 Canadian federal election: Lévis
| Party | Candidate | Votes |
|---|---|---|
| Liberal | Joseph-Étienne Dussault | 7,127 |
| Conservative | Émile Fortin | 5,838 |

By-election on 8 July 1930
| Party | Candidate | Votes |
| Conservative | Émile Fortin | 7,065 |
| Liberal | Joseph-Étienne Dussault | 6,880 |

1935 Canadian federal election: Lévis
| Party | Candidate | Votes |
|---|---|---|
| Liberal | Joseph-Etienne Dussault | 8,488 |
| Conservative | Albert Dumontier | 3,770 |
| Reconstruction | Laval-Édouard Fortier | 316 |
| Liberal–Labour | Charles-Achille Cauchy | 54 |
