= Lévis (federal electoral district) =

Former federal electoral district in Quebec, Canada

Quebec electoral district

Defunct federal electoral district
- Legislature: House of Commons
- District created: 1867
- District abolished: 2003
- First contested: 1867
- Last contested: 2000

Lévis (French pronunciation: [levi]) was a federal electoral district (riding) in Quebec, Canada, which was represented in the House of Commons from 1867 to 2004. It was created by the British North America Act, 1867. From 1998 to 2003, it was known as Lévis-et-Chutes-de-la-Chaudière. It was abolished in 2003 when it was redistributed into the Lévis—Bellechasse and Lotbinière—Chutes-de-la-Chaudière ridings.

== History ==
The Lévis electoral district consisted initially of the County of Lévis. During 1924, it was redefined to specifically include the City of Lévis.

During 1933, it was redefined to consist of only the parts of the county of Lévis included in the city of Lévis, town of Lauzon, Village de Charny, and the municipalities of St-David de l'Aube-Rivière, Ste-Hélène-de-Breakeyville, St-Joseph-de-la-Pointe-de-Lévis, St-Louis-de-Gonzague-de-Pintendre, St-Romuald d'Etchemin and St-Télesphore.

Subsequently, during 1947, it was redefined to consist of the country of Lévis, excluding the municipalities of Rivière-Boyer, St. Henri-de-Lauzon and the village of St. Henri, and including the city of Lévis and the town of Lauzon.

In 1966, it was redefined to consist of:

- the Cities of Lauzon and Lévis;
- the Towns of Saint-David-de-l'Auberivière, Saint-Jean-Chrysostôme, Saint-Nicolas and Saint-Romuald-d'Etchemin;
- the county of Lévis;
- in the County of Dorchester: the village municipalities of Saint-Bernard and Saint-Isidore; the parish municipalities of Saint-Bernard, Sainte-Hénédine, Saint-Isidore, Sainte-Marguerite and Saint-Maxime; the municipality of Taschereau-Fortier; and
- in the County of Lotbinière: the village municipalities of Francoeur, Saint-Agapitville, Sainte-Agathe, Saint-Patrice-de-Beaurivage and Saint-Sylvestre; the parish municipalities of Saint-Agapit-de-Beaurivage, Sainte-Agathe, Saint-Apollinaire, Saint-Gilles, Saint-Narcisse-de-Beaurivage, Saint-Patrice-de-Beaurivage and Saint-Sylvestre.

In 1976, it was redefined to consist of:

- the Cities of Lauzon, Lévis and Saint-Romuald-d'Etchemin;
- the Towns of Charny, Saint-David-de-l'Auberivière, Saint-Jean-Chrysostôme and Saint-Nicolas;
- the County of Lévis;
- in the County of Bellechasse: the village municipality of Saint Charles; the parish municipalities of Saint-Charles-Borromée and Saint-Étienne-de-Beaumont;
- in the County of Dorchester: the village municipalities of Saint-Anselme, Saint-Bernard and Saint-Isidore; the parish municipalities of Saint-Anselme, Saint-Bernard, Sainte-Hénédine, Saint-Isidore and Saint-Maxime; the municipality of Taschereau-Fortier; and
- in the County of Lotbinière: the village municipalities of Saint-Agapitville and Saint-Patrice-de-Beaurivage; the parish municipalities of Saint-Agapit-de-Beaurivage, Saint-Gilles, Saint-Narcisse-de-Beaurivage and Saint-Patrice-de-Beaurivage.

In 1987, it was redefined to consist of:

- the Towns of Charny, Lauzon, Lévis, Saint-David-de-l'Auberivière, Saint-Jean-Chrysostome, Saint-Nicholas, Saint-Rédempteur and Saint-Romuald;
- the County of Lévis; and
- in the County of Lotbinière: the parish municipality of Saint-Narcisse-de-Beaurivage.

In 1996, it was redefined to consist of:

- the cities of Charny, Lévis, Saint-Jean-Chrysostome, Saint-Nicolas, Saint-Rédempteur and Saint-Romuald;
- the County Regional Municipality of Desjardins;
- the County Regional Municipality of Les Chutes-de-la-Chaudière, excepting the Parish Municipality of Saint-Lambert-de-Lauzon.

In 1998, it renamed "Lévis-et-Chutes-de-la-Chaudière". It was abolished in 2003 when it was redistributed between into Lévis—Bellechasse and Lotbinière—Chutes-de-la-Chaudière ridings.

=== Members of Parliament ===
This riding elected the following members of Parliament:

Parliament	Years	Member	Party
Lévis
1st	1867–1872	Joseph-Goderic Blanchet	Liberal–Conservative
2nd	1872–1874	Joseph-Goderic Blanchet	Liberal–Conservative
3rd	1874–1878	Louis-Honoré Fréchette	Liberal
4th	1878–1882	Joseph-Goderic Blanchet	Liberal–Conservative
5th	1882–1883	Joseph-Goderic Blanchet	Liberal–Conservative
5th	1883–1885	Isidore-Noël Belleau	Conservative
5th	1885–1887	Pierre Malcom Guay	Liberal
6th	1887–1891	Pierre Malcom Guay	Liberal
7th	1891–1896	Pierre Malcom Guay	Liberal
8th	1896–1899	Pierre Malcom Guay	Liberal
8th	1899–1900	Louis Julien Demers	Liberal
9th	1900–1904	Louis Julien Demers	Liberal
10th	1904–1905	Louis Julien Demers	Liberal
10th	1905–1908	Louis Auguste Carrier	Liberal
11th	1908–1911	Louis Auguste Carrier	Liberal
12th	1911–1917	Joseph-Boutin Bourassa	Liberal
13th	1917–1921	Joseph-Boutin Bourassa	Liberal
14th	1921–1925	Joseph-Boutin Bourassa	Liberal
15th	1925–1926	Joseph-Étienne Dussault	Liberal
16th	1926–1930	Joseph-Étienne Dussault	Liberal
17th	1930–1935	Émile Fortin	Conservative
18th	1935–1940	Joseph-Étienne Dussault	Liberal
19th	1940–1945	Maurice Bourget	Liberal
20th	1945–1949	Maurice Bourget	Independent Liberal
21st	1949–1953	Maurice Bourget	Liberal
22nd	1953–1957	Maurice Bourget	Liberal
23rd	1957–1958	Maurice Bourget	Liberal
24th	1958–1962	Maurice Bourget	Liberal
25th	1962–1963	Joseph-Aurélien Roy	Social Credit
26th	1963–1965	Raynald Guay	Liberal
27th	1965–1968	Raynald Guay	Liberal
28th	1968–1972	Raynald Guay	Liberal
29th	1972–1974	Raynald Guay	Liberal
30th	1974–1979	Raynald Guay	Liberal
31st	1979–1980	Raynald Guay	Liberal
32nd	1980–1980	Raynald Guay	Liberal
32nd	1981–1984	Gaston Gourde	Liberal
33rd	1984–1988	Gabriel Fontaine	Progressive Conservative
34th	1988–1993	Gabriel Fontaine	Progressive Conservative
35th	1993–1997	Antoine Dubé	Bloc Québécois
36th	1997–2000	Antoine Dubé	Bloc Québécois
Lévis-et-Chutes-de-la-Chaudière
37th	2000–2003	Antoine Dubé	Bloc Québécois
37th	2003–2004	Christian Jobin	Liberal
Riding dissolved into Lévis—Bellechasse and Lotbinière—Chutes-de-la-Chaudière

== Election results ==
=== Lévis ===
1867 Canadian federal election
Party	Candidate	Votes
Liberal–Conservative	Joseph-Goderic Blanchet	acclaimed
Source: Canadian Elections Database

1872 Canadian federal election
Party	Candidate	Votes
Liberal–Conservative	Joseph-Goderic Blanchet	1,564
Independent	Louis-Honoré Fréchette	1,475
Source: Canadian Elections Database

1874 Canadian federal election
Party	Candidate	Votes
Liberal	Louis-Honoré Fréchette	1,670
Independent	J. Chabot	1,572
Source: lop.parl.ca

1878 Canadian federal election
Party	Candidate	Votes
Liberal–Conservative	Joseph-Goderic Blanchet	2,144
Liberal	Louis-Honoré Fréchette	2,026

1882 Canadian federal election
Party	Candidate	Votes
Liberal–Conservative	Joseph-Goderic Blanchet	1,935
Liberal	L. Fréchette	1,528

By-election on 25 October 1883 Blanchet named Collector of Customs, Port of Quebec, 1 November 1883
Party	Candidate	Votes
Conservative	Isidore-Noël Belleau	1,551
Unknown	O.B. Samson	703

By-election on 14 April 1885 Belleau unseated on a judgement of the Supreme Court, 16 March 1885
Party	Candidate	Votes
Liberal	Pierre Malcom Guay	acclaimed

1887 Canadian federal election
Party	Candidate	Votes
Liberal	Pierre Malcom Guay	2,170
Conservative	Charles Darveau	1,776

1891 Canadian federal election
Party	Candidate	Votes
Liberal	Pierre Malcom Guay	2,075
Conservative	E.T. Paquet	1,794

1896 Canadian federal election
Party	Candidate	Votes
Liberal	Pierre Malcom Guay	2,271
Conservative	J.E.Gelley	1,963

1900 Canadian federal election
Party	Candidate	Votes
Liberal	Louis Julien Demers	2,455
Conservative	J.A. Dumontier	1,630

1904 Canadian federal election
Party	Candidate	Votes
Liberal	Louis Julien Demers	2,642
Conservative	Joseph Isaac Lavery	1,677

By-election on 22 March 1899 Guay's death, 19 February 1899
Party	Candidate	Votes
Liberal	Louis Julien Demers	acclaimed

By-election on 6 June 1905 Demers' death, 29 April 1905
Party	Candidate	Votes
Liberal	Louis Auguste Carrier	acclaimed

1908 Canadian federal election
Party	Candidate	Votes
Liberal	Louis Auguste Carrier	2,841
Liberal	Joseph Boutin Bourassa	1,691

1911 Canadian federal election
Party	Candidate	Votes
Liberal	Joseph Boutin Bourassa	2,800
Conservative	Joseph Bégin	1,971

1917 Canadian federal election
Party	Candidate	Votes
Opposition (Laurier Liberals)	Joseph Boutin Bourassa	5,174
Government (Unionist)	Alphonse Bernier	984

1921 Canadian federal election
Party	Candidate	Votes
Liberal	Joseph-Boutin Bourassa	8,787
Conservative	Louis Gédéon Gravel	4,004

1925 Canadian federal election
Party	Candidate	Votes
Liberal	Joseph-Étienne Dussault	7,192
Conservative	L. Gédéon Gravel	4,899

1926 Canadian federal election
Party	Candidate	Votes
Liberal	Joseph-Étienne Dussault	7,127
Conservative	Émile Fortin	5,838

By-election on 8 July 1930
Party	Candidate	Votes
Conservative	Émile Fortin	7,065
Liberal	Joseph-Étienne Dussault	6,880

1935 Canadian federal election
Party	Candidate	Votes
Liberal	Joseph-Etienne Dussault	8,488
Conservative	Albert Dumontier	3,770
Reconstruction	Laval-Édouard Fortier	316
Liberal–Labour	Charles-Achille Cauchy	54

1940 Canadian federal election
Party	Candidate	Votes
Liberal	Maurice Bourget	8,885
National Government	Albert Dumontier	4,187

1945 Canadian federal election
Party	Candidate	Votes
Independent Liberal	Maurice Bourget	10,098
Social Credit	Abel Paradis	4,233

1949 Canadian federal election
Party	Candidate	Votes
Liberal	Maurice Bourget	11,752
Independent	J.-Adélard Bégin	6,851
Union des électeurs	Abel Paradis	655
Progressive Conservative	Joseph-Louis-Gonzague McClish	72

1953 Canadian federal election
Party	Candidate	Votes
Liberal	Maurice Bourget	13,897
Progressive Conservative	Napoléon Grenier	5,305
Labor–Progressive	Joseph-Wilfrid Jolin	74

1957 Canadian federal election
Party	Candidate	Votes
Liberal	Maurice Bourget	14,693
Progressive Conservative	Jean Forgues	5,770

1958 Canadian federal election
Party	Candidate	Votes
Liberal	Maurice Bourget	12,410
Progressive Conservative	Jean Forgues	9,164

1962 Canadian federal election
Party	Candidate	Votes
Social Credit	Joseph-Aurélien Roy	11,504
Liberal	Maurice Bourget	8,826
Progressive Conservative	Jean-Marie Morin	3,575

1963 Canadian federal election
Party	Candidate	Votes
Liberal	Raynald Guay	9,634
Social Credit	J.-A. Roy	9,315
Progressive Conservative	Jean-Marie Morin	4,563

1965 Canadian federal election
Party	Candidate	Votes
Liberal	Raynald Guay	10,895
Ralliement créditiste	J.-A. Roy	9,839
Progressive Conservative	Raymond Doré	2,175
New Democratic	Jean-Guy Ramsay	1,156

1968 Canadian federal election
Party	Candidate	Votes
Liberal	Raynald Guay	12,227
Ralliement créditiste	Henri Borgia	9,887
Progressive Conservative	Paul-Émile Dubé	9,523
New Democratic	Jean-Guy Ramsay	1,189

1972 Canadian federal election
Party	Candidate	Votes
Liberal	Raynald Guay	17,588
Social Credit	Jean Ricard	10,256
Progressive Conservative	Paul-Émile Dubé	9,848
New Democratic	André Therrien	1,593
No affiliation	Serge De Beaumont	519

1974 Canadian federal election
Party	Candidate	Votes
Liberal	Raynald Guay	20,348
Progressive Conservative	André Godbout	11,485
New Democratic	Gérard Dionne	4,279
Marxist–Leninist	Richard Allard	404

1979 Canadian federal election
Party	Candidate	Votes
Liberal	Raynald Guay	31,753
Social Credit	André Godbout	11,403
Progressive Conservative	Roland Garneau	6,726
New Democratic	Gérard Dionne	3,392
Union populaire	Paul Biron	841
Marxist–Leninist	Richard Allard	341

1980 Canadian federal election
Party	Candidate	Votes
Liberal	Raynald Guay	35,519
New Democratic	Daniel Vachon	6,459
Progressive Conservative	Roland Garneau	4,759
Social Credit	Jacques Audet	3,385
Rhinoceros	Gervais Prime Richard	2,652
Union populaire	Yves Lavoie	264
Marxist–Leninist	RichardAllard	118
Independent	Robert Nolet	101
lop.parl.ca

By-election on 4 May 1981 Resignation of Mr. Raynald Guay, 29 August 1980
Party	Candidate	Votes
Liberal	Gaston Gourde	15,591
Progressive Conservative	Richard Janelle	10,052
New Democratic	Daniel Vachon	5,235
Rhinoceros	Aurélien Thériault	1,900
Union populaire	Jean-Paul Bourcier	540
Social Credit	Martin Caya	367
Independent	John Turmel	172

1984 Canadian federal election
Party	Candidate	Votes
Progressive Conservative	Gabriel Fontaine	32,338
Liberal	Gaston Gourde	17,283
New Democratic	Jean-Paul Harney	12,076
Parti nationaliste	Antoine Dubé	1,649
Rhinoceros	Raymond Emiliano Marquis	1,630
Social Credit	Jean-Paul Rhéaume	216

1988 Canadian federal election
Party	Candidate	Votes
Progressive Conservative	Gabriel Fontaine	33,673
Liberal	Denis Sonier	13,002
New Democratic	Jean-Paul Harney	11,501
Social Credit	Jean-Paul Rhéaume	445

1993 Canadian federal election
Party	Candidate	Votes
Bloc Québécois	Antoine Dubé	40,184
Liberal	Jean-Marc Gagnon	14,254
Progressive Conservative	Serge Léveillé	9,163
New Democratic	Marie-France Renaud	1,182
Abolitionist	Carole Carrier	705

1997 Canadian federal election
Party	Candidate	Votes
Bloc Québécois	Antoine Dubé	27,870
Liberal	Jocelyne Gosselin	17,256
Progressive Conservative	Thérèse Boucher	14,630
New Democratic	France Michaud	1,881

=== Lévis-et-Chutes-de-la-Chaudière ===
2000 Canadian federal election
Party	Candidate	Votes
Bloc Québécois	Antoine Dubé	26,398
Liberal	Shirley Baril	21,522
Alliance	Jacques Bergeron	9,152
Progressive Conservative	Réal St-Laurent	4,222
New Democratic	France Michaud	1,411
Communist	André Cloutier	374

Canadian federal by-election, 16 June 2003
Party	Candidate	Votes	%
Liberal	Christian Jobin	13,115	55.6
Bloc Québécois	Maxime Fréchette	8,274	35.1
New Democratic	Louise Foisy	987	4.2
Progressive Conservative	Yohan Nolet	537	2.3
Green	Yonnel Bonaventure	254	1.1
Alliance	Philippe Bouchard	220	0.9
Marijuana	Benjamin Kasapoglu	186	0.8
Called upon Dubé's resignation, 17 March 2003.

== See also ==
- List of Canadian electoral districts
- Historical federal electoral districts of Canada
