= Isidore-Noël Belleau =

Canadian politician (1847–1936)

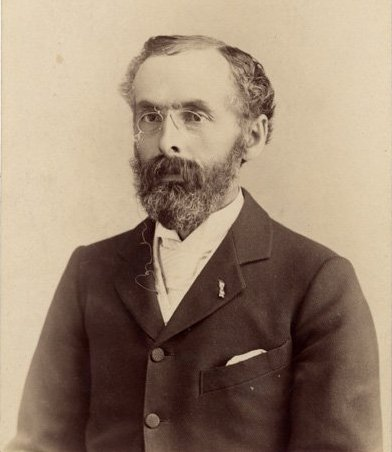

Member of the Canadian Parliament for Lévis
- In office 1883–1885
- Preceded by: Joseph-Godéric Blanchet
- Succeeded by: Pierre Malcom Guay

Personal details
- Born: March 7, 1847 Deschambault, Canada East
- Died: May 7, 1936 (aged 89)
- Party: Conservative Party
- Relations: Isidore Belleau (Father); Marie-Désanges Pagé (Mother)
- Occupation: director editor lawyer

Isidore-Noël Belleau (March 7, 1847 in Deschambault, Canada West – May 7, 1936) was a Canadian politician, director, editor and lawyer. He was elected to the House of Commons of Canada in an 1883 by-election to represent the riding of Lévis. He was also defeated in the elections of 1874 for Portneuf and 1887 for Bellechasse. He was elected as mayor of Lévis, Quebec between 1891 and 1895. His son-in-law, Émile Fortin, was a senator and Member of Parliament.
