= Maurice Bourget =

Canadian politician

The Honourable Maurice Bourget
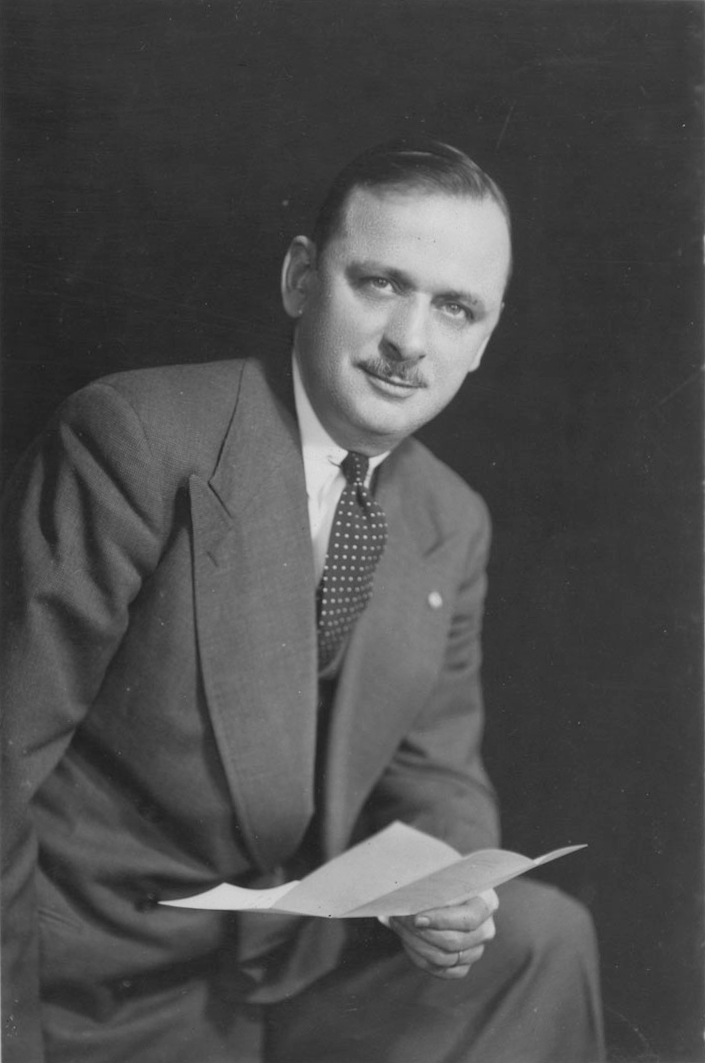

Member of the Canadian Parliament for Lévis
- In office 1940–1962
- Preceded by: Joseph-Étienne Dussault
- Succeeded by: Joseph-Aurélien Roy

Senator from The Laurentides
- In office April 27, 1963 – March 29, 1979
- Appointed by: Lester B. Pearson
- Preceded by: Télésophore Damien Bouchard
- Succeeded by: Arthur Tremblay

Personal details
- Born: October 20, 1907 Lauzon, Quebec
- Died: March 29, 1979 (aged 71)
- Party: Liberal
- Committees: Chairman, Standing Committee on Miscellaneous Private Bills (1966-1968)
- Portfolio: Speaker of the Senate (1963-1966); Parliamentary Assistant to the Minister of Public Works (1953-1957)

Maurice Bourget, PC (French pronunciation: [mɔʁis buʁʒɛ]; October 20, 1907 – March 29, 1979) was a Canadian politician who was Speaker of the Senate of Canada from April 27, 1963 to January 6, 1966.

Bourget was born in Lauzon, Quebec and played semi-professional baseball and softball in Levis as a young man. He trained as a civil engineer and practiced in Levis.

A Liberal since the age of 19, Bourget was first elected to the House of Commons of Canada as a Liberal in 1940. Bourget and several other Quebec Liberal MPs had broken with their party the year before during the Conscription Crisis of 1944, quitting the Liberal caucus in order to oppose the government's decision to deploy National Resources Mobilization Act conscripts overseas. Previously, conscripts had only been used for "home defence" and kept within Canada. He ran and was re-elected as an "Independent Liberal" in 1945 defeating his only opponent, a Social Credit candidate.

Bourget reconciled with the Liberal Party in the post-war period and was again elected as a Liberal in 1949 and was re-elected in subsequent elections until his defeat in 1962 due to an upsurge in support for the Social Credit party.

As an MP, Bourget served as a delegate to the United Nations General Assembly in 1951. From 1953 to 1957 he served as parliamentary assistant to the Minister of Public Works.

He returned to parliament in 1963 when he was appointed to the Senate on the advice of the newly elected Liberal Prime Minister, Lester Pearson and was concurrently appointed Speaker of the upper house. As such, he also served as Joint Chairman of the Canadian delegation to the meeting of the Canada-U.S.A. Inter parliamentary Group at Washington in January 1964 and Joint Chairman of the Inter parliamentary Conference held in Ottawa in September 1965.

Bourget stepped down as Speaker in January 1966 and was appointed to the Privy Council in February. He remained a Senator until his death in 1979.

1940 Canadian federal election: Lévis
Party	Candidate	Votes
Liberal	Maurice Bourget	8,885
National Government	Albert Dumontier	4,187

1945 Canadian federal election: Lévis
Party	Candidate	Votes
Independent Liberal	Maurice Bourget	10,098
Social Credit	Abel Paradis	4,233

1949 Canadian federal election: Lévis
Party	Candidate	Votes
Liberal	Maurice Bourget	11,752
Independent	J.-Adélard Bégin	6,851
Union des électeurs	Abel Paradis	655
Progressive Conservative	Joseph-Louis-Gonzague McClish	72

1953 Canadian federal election: Lévis
Party	Candidate	Votes
Liberal	Maurice Bourget	13,897
Progressive Conservative	Napoléon Grenier	5,305
Labor–Progressive	Joseph-Wilfrid Jolin	74

1957 Canadian federal election: Lévis
Party	Candidate	Votes
Liberal	Maurice Bourget	14,693
Progressive Conservative	Jean Forgues	5,770

1958 Canadian federal election: Lévis
Party	Candidate	Votes
Liberal	Maurice Bourget	12,410
Progressive Conservative	Jean Forgues	9,164

1962 Canadian federal election: Lévis
Party	Candidate	Votes
Social Credit	Joseph-Aurélien Roy	11,504
Liberal	Maurice Bourget	8,826
Progressive Conservative	Jean-Marie Morin	3,575
