= Joseph Boutin Bourassa =

Canadian politician

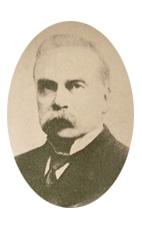

Member of the Canadian Parliament for Lévis
- In office 1911–1925
- Preceded by: Louis-Auguste Carrier
- Succeeded by: Joseph-Étienne Dussault

Personal details
- Born: 13 November 1853 St. Romuald, Canada East
- Died: 12 July 1943 (aged 89)
- Party: Liberal
- Occupation: Civil law notary

Joseph Boutin Bourassa (French pronunciation: [ʒozɛf butɛ̃ buʁasa]; 13 November 1853 – 12 July 1943) was a politician and notary. He was elected to the House of Commons of Canada in 1911 as a Member of the Liberal Party to represent the riding of Lévis. He was re-elected in 1917 as a Laurier Liberal and 1921. He lost the 1908 election in Lévis to Louis-Auguste Carrier.

1908 Canadian federal election: Lévis
| Party | Candidate | Votes |
|---|---|---|
| Liberal | Louis Auguste Carrier | 2,841 |
| Liberal | Joseph Boutin Bourassa | 1,691 |

1911 Canadian federal election: Lévis
| Party | Candidate | Votes |
|---|---|---|
| Liberal | Joseph Boutin Bourassa | 2,800 |
| Conservative | Joseph Bégin | 1,971 |

1917 Canadian federal election: Lévis
| Party | Candidate | Votes |
|---|---|---|
| Opposition (Laurier Liberals) | Joseph Boutin Bourassa | 5,174 |
| Government (Unionist) | Alphonse Bernier | 984 |

1921 Canadian federal election: Lévis
| Party | Candidate | Votes |
|---|---|---|
| Liberal | Joseph-Boutin Bourassa | 8,787 |
| Conservative | Louis Gédéon Gravel | 4,004 |
