= Louis Auguste Carrier =

Canadian politician (1858–1928)

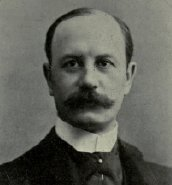

Member of the Canadian Parliament for Lévis
- In office 1905–1911
- Preceded by: Louis Julien Demers
- Succeeded by: Joseph Boutin Bourassa

Personal details
- Born: May 24, 1858 Lévis, Canada East
- Died: March 10, 1928 (aged 69)
- Party: Liberal

Louis Auguste Carrier (May 24, 1858 – March 10, 1928) was a Canadian politician.

Born in Lévis, Canada East, the son of Antoine Carrier and Helen Sheppard, Carrier was educated at the college of Levis, the Quebec High School and the College of Poughkeepsie. In 1883, he was appointed a Director of the Quebec Central Railway. He was first elected to the House of Commons of Canada for the electoral division of Lévis in a by-election held in 1905. A Liberal, he was re-elected in 1908. He did not run in 1911.

By-election on 6 June 1905 Demers' death, 29 April 1905
Party	Candidate	Votes
Liberal	Louis Auguste Carrier	acclaimed

1908 Canadian federal election: Lévis
Party	Candidate	Votes
Liberal	Louis Auguste Carrier	2,841
Liberal	Joseph Boutin Bourassa	1,691
