= Christian Jobin =

Canadian politician

Christian Jobin (born April 7, 1952) is a Canadian politician and was the Member of Parliament (MP) for the district of Lévis-et-Chutes-de-la-Chaudière from 2003 to 2004. He has been a Liberal.

Jobin was the mayor of St-Étienne-de-Lauzon from 1993 to 2001. He ran in the 1998 provincial election in Chutes-de-la-Chaudière, but was defeated. He also ran for mayor in Lévis in 2001 but he was defeated by Jean Garon.

In 2003, Jobin won a by-election and became a Member of Parliament. In 2004 though, the number of Liberal MPs from Quebec significantly decreased and Jobin lost the merged seat of Lévis—Bellechasse to Bloc Québécois candidate Réal Lapierre. He is a former accountant, and is married with 5 children.

Canadian federal by-election, 16 June 2003
Party	Candidate	Votes	%
Liberal	Christian Jobin	13,115	55.6
Bloc Québécois	Maxime Fréchette	8,274	35.1
New Democratic	Louise Foisy	987	4.2
Progressive Conservative	Yohan Nolet	537	2.3
Green	Yonnel Bonaventure	254	1.1
Alliance	Philippe Bouchard	220	0.9
Marijuana	Benjamin Kasapoglu	186	0.8
Called upon Dubé's resignation, 17 March 2003.

Preceded by Antoine Dubé, Bloc Québécois	Members of Parliament from Lévis-et-Chutes-de-la-Chaudière; 2003 to 2004	Succeeded by Riding merged into Lévis—Bellechasse
