= Gaston Gourde =

Canadian politician and lawyer

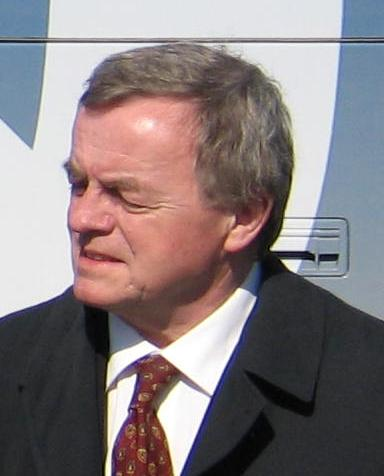
Gourde during the 2011 federal election.

Gaston Gourde (born 17 March 1950 in Saint-Isidore, Quebec) was a Liberal party member of the House of Commons of Canada. He was a lawyer by career.

Gourde represented the Lévis, Quebec electoral district after winning a 4 May 1981 by-election. He served the latter part of the 32nd Canadian Parliament until he was defeated in 1984 federal election by Gabriel Fontaine of the Progressive Conservative party. Gourde attempted a political comeback in the 2011 federal election unsuccessfully running for the Bloc Québécois in the riding of Lotbinière—Chutes-de-la-Chaudière.

== Electoral record ==
By-election on 4 May 1981 Resignation of Mr. Raynald Guay, 29 August 1980
Party	Candidate	Votes
Liberal	Gaston Gourde	15,591
Progressive Conservative	Richard Janelle	10,052
New Democratic	Daniel Vachon	5,235
Rhinoceros	Aurélien Thériault	1,900
Union populaire	Jean-Paul Bourcier	540
Social Credit	Martin Caya	367
Independent	John Turmel	172

1984 Canadian federal election: Lévis
Party	Candidate	Votes
Progressive Conservative	Gabriel Fontaine	32,338
Liberal	Gaston Gourde	17,283
New Democratic	Jean-Paul Harney	12,076
Parti nationaliste	Antoine Dubé	1,649
Rhinoceros	Raymond Emiliano Marquis	1,630
Social Credit	Jean-Paul Rhéaume	216
