= 2025 Lévis municipal election =

Election in Quebec, Canada

- Mayoral election
← 2021	November 2, 2025	2029 →
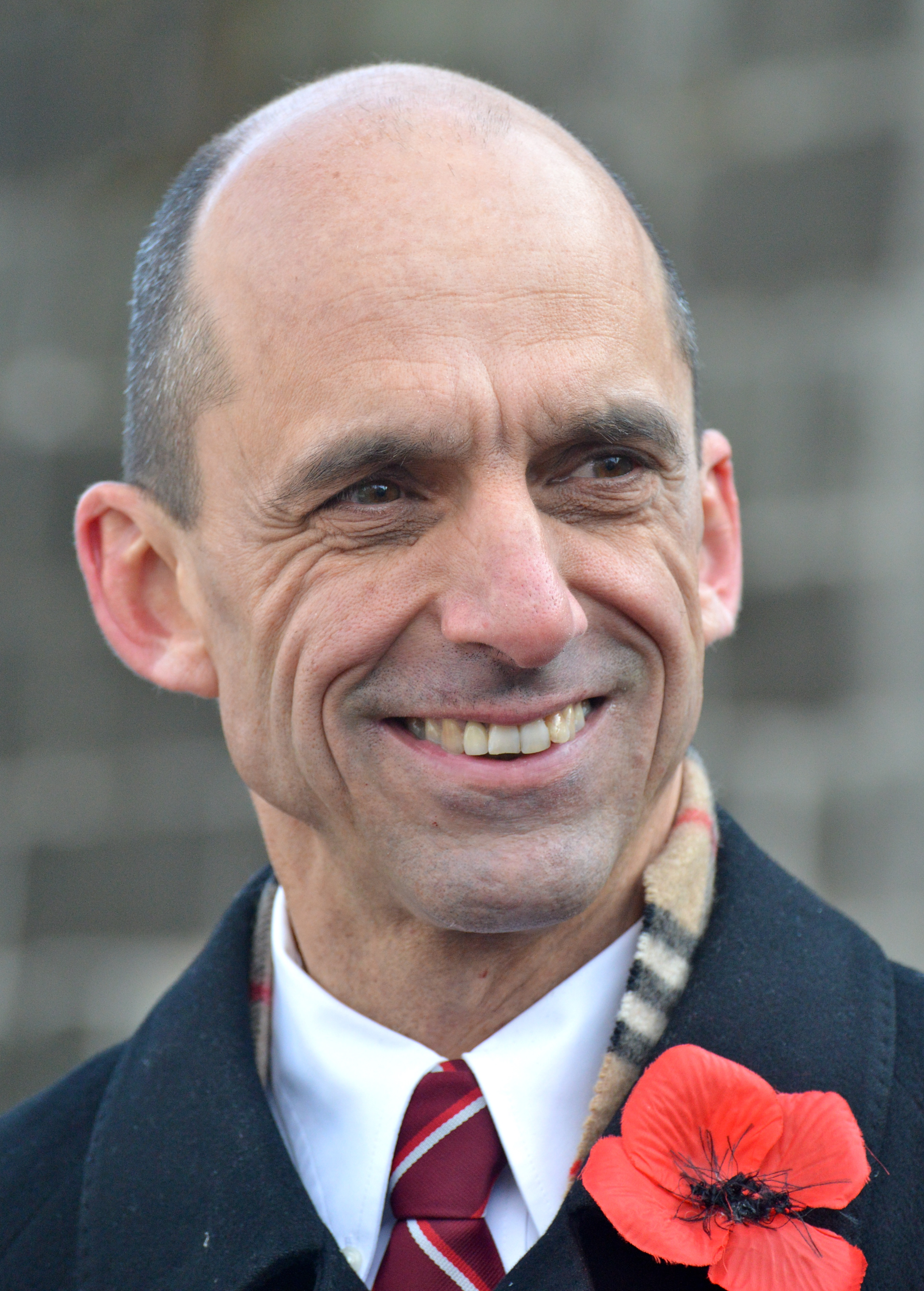

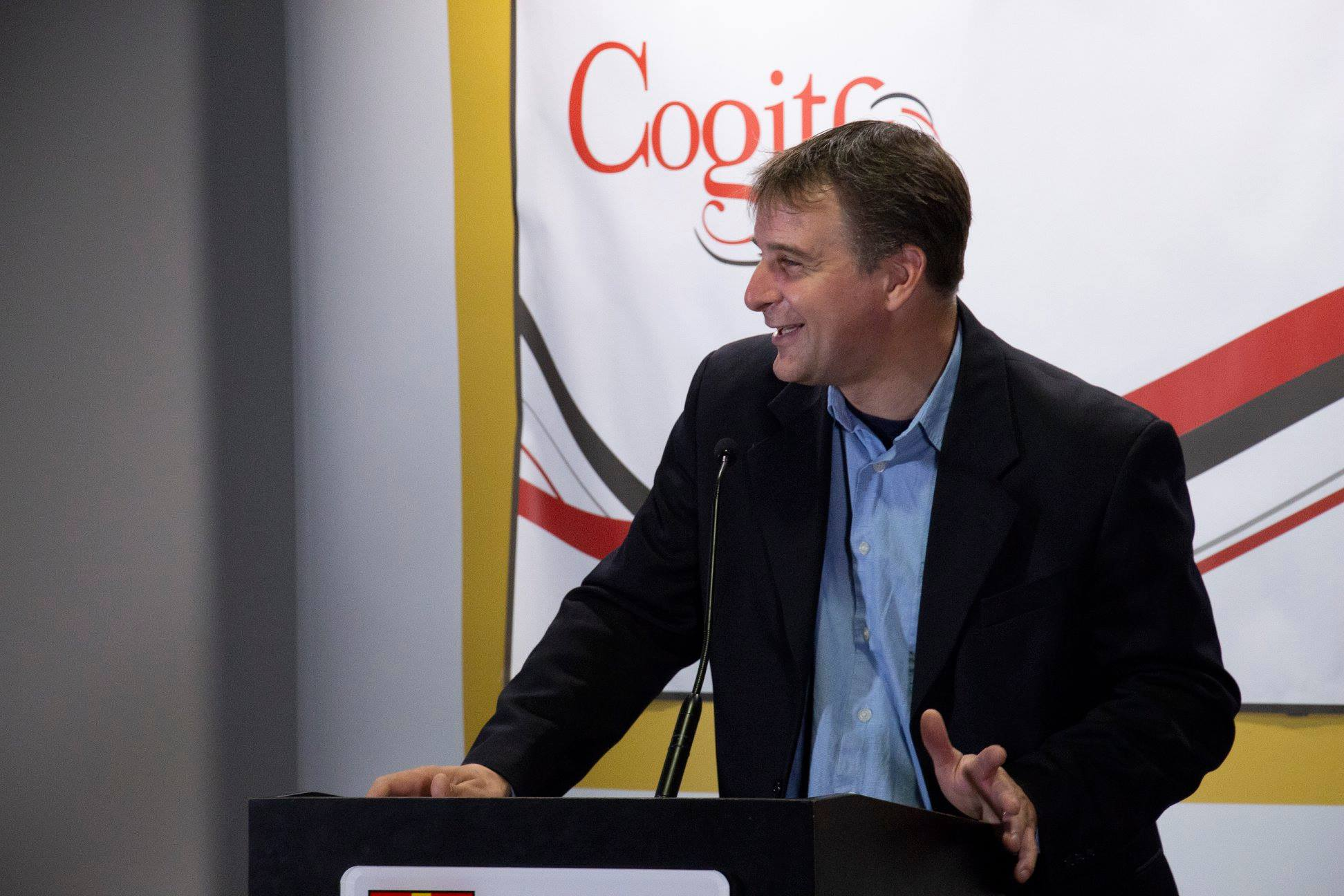
			LF10
Nominee	Steven Blaney	Serge Bonin	Isabelle Demers
Party	Prospérité Lévis	Repensons Lévis	Lévis Force 10
Popular vote	25,736	17,836	15,543
Percentage	43.54%	30.17%	26.29%
Mayor before election
Gilles Lehouillier
Lévis Force 10
Elected mayor
Steven Blaney
Prospérité Lévis
- City Council election
← 2021	November 2, 2025	2029 →
- 15 seats on Lévis City Council; 8 seats needed for a majority
Party	Leader	Vote %	Seats	+/–
Prospérité Lévis	Steven Blaney		9	+9
Repensons Lévis	Serge Bonin		4	+3
Lévis Force 10	Isabelle Demers		2	−12
This lists parties that won seats. See the complete results below.
Results of the city council election

The 2025 Lévis municipal election took place on November 2, 2025, to elect a mayor and city councillors in Lévis, Quebec, Canada. The election was held in conjunction with municipal elections held across Quebec on that date. The incumbent mayor Gilles Lehouillier, who has held the post since 2013, decided to retire.

== City council ==
=== District 1 - Saint-Étienne ===
Party	Candidate	Vote	%
Repensons Lévis	Anthony Dufour	2,559	54.73
Prospérité Lévis	René Gagnon	1,276	27.29
Lévis Force 10	Dominique Pelletier	841	17.99

=== District 2 - Saint-Nicolas ===
Party	Candidate	Vote	%
Repensons Lévis	Isabelle Lefebvre	1,762	40.98
Prospérité Lévis	Audrey Bernier	1,592	37.02
Lévis Force 10	Jeannot Demers (X)	946	22.00

=== District 3 - Villieu ===
Party	Candidate	Vote	%
Repensons Lévis	Audrey Bédard	1,422	37.11
Prospérité Lévis	Sandy Delisle	1,306	34.08
Lévis Force 10	Anne-Hélène Couturier	1,104	28.21

=== District 4 - Saint-Rédempteur ===
Party	Candidate	Vote	%
Lévis Force 10	Benoit Forget-Chiasson	1,942	41.22
Repensons Lévis	Francis Duperron	1,478	31.37
Prospérité Lévis	Daniel Bolduc	1,291	27.40

=== District 5 - Charny ===
Party	Candidate	Vote	%
Prospérité Lévis	Daniel Saindon	1,793	49.50
Repensons Lévis	Karine Barma	957	26.42
Lévis Force 10	Alain Falardeau	872	24.08

=== District 6 - Breakeyville ===
Party	Candidate	Vote	%
Lévis Force 10	Karine Lavertu (X)	1,360	37.15
Prospérité Lévis	William Morin-Roy	1,250	34.14
Repensons Lévis	Dina Daher	1,051	28.71

=== District 7 - Saint-Jean ===
Party	Candidate	Vote	%
Prospérité Lévis	Alain Quirion	1,419	41.76
Lévis Force 10	Luc Proteau	1,253	36.87
Repensons Lévis	Gabriel Samson I	726	21.37

=== District 8 - Taniata ===
Party	Candidate	Vote	%
Prospérité Lévis	Erik Bilodeau	1,445	39.08
Lévis Force 10	François Cholette	1,317	35.61
Repensons Lévis	Danielle Madeleine Gohoulou	936	25.31

=== District 9 - Saint-Romuald ===
Party	Candidate	Vote	%
Prospérité Lévis	Anick Tremblay	1,621	39.59
Repensons Lévis	Jean-François Meilleur	1,506	36.79
Lévis Force 10	René Fortin	967	23.62

=== District 10 - Notre-Dame ===
Party	Candidate	Vote	%
Prospérité Lévis	Anne-Marie Tremblay	1,520	42.46
Repensons Lévis	Marc-Antoine Bélanger	1,330	37.15
Lévis Force 10	Elhadji Mamadou Diarra	730	20.39

=== District 11 - Saint-David ===
Party	Candidate	Vote	%
Prospérité Lévis	Jean Demers	1,740	46.62
Repensons Lévis	André Côté	1,003	26.88
Lévis Force 10	Marie-Josée Gauthier	989	26.50

=== District 12 - Christ-Roi ===
Party	Candidate	Vote	%
Prospérité Lévis	Jean Leblond	1,755	43.79
Lévis Force 10	Janet Jones	1,218	30.39
Repensons Lévis	Brittany Blais	1,035	25.82

=== District 13 - Bienville ===
Party	Candidate	Vote	%
Prospérité Lévis	Olivier Biron	1,573	42.31
Lévis Force 10	Amélie Landry (X)	1,109	29.83
Repensons Lévis	Joshua Ménard-Suarez	1,036	27.86

=== District 14 - Lauzon ===
Party	Candidate	Vote	%
Prospérité Lévis	Mélanie Sicotte	1,929	46.65
Repensons Lévis	Patricia Turcotte	1,188	28.73
Lévis Force 10	Fleur Paradis (X)	1,018	24.62

=== District 15 - Pintendre ===
Party	Candidate	Vote	%
Repensons Lévis	Éric Nadeau	1,462	41.80
Prospérité Lévis	Karine Laflamme	1,379	39.42
Lévis Force 10	Claude Beland	657	18.78
