= List of mayors of Fort Frances =

This is a list of mayors of Fort Frances. The town of Fort Frances, Ontario was incorporated in 1903.

== Mayors of Fort Frances ==
- Walter Keating (1903-1905)
- Joseph Osborne (1905-1906)
- Herb Williams (1907-1910, 1917,1918)
- D. C. McKenzie (1911-1913, 1915, 1919)
- Louis Christie (1914)
- Robert Moore (1916)
- Archie McTaggart (1920-1923)
- J.P. Wright (1924)
- W.H. Elliott (1925-1926)
- Walter Woodward (1927-1928)
- Fred Morrison (1929-1930, 1934-1935)
- B.V. Holmes (1931-1933, 1943-1951)
- J.H. Parker (1936-1942)
- J.T. Livingstone (1951-1954, 1959-1961)
- George Edward Lockhart (1955-1956)
- J.M. Newman (1957-1958)
- J.R. McVey (1962-1967)
- Aimo Marshall (1968-1971)
- Allan Avis (1972-1980)
- Dean Cunningham (1981-1985)
- Dick Lyons (1986-1991)
- Glenn Witherspoon (1992-2003)
- Dan Onichuk (2003-2006)
- Roy Avis (2006-2018)
- June Caul (2018-2022)
- Andrew Hallikas (2022-Present)
