= List of mayors of Medicine Hat =

This is a list of mayors of Medicine Hat, Alberta.

== Mayors ==
Mayor		Term began	Term ended	Time in Office	Ref
1	William Bradley Marshall	1899	1900	3 Years	
2	William Finlay	1900	1903	3 Years	
3	Archibald Hawthorne	1903	1904	1 Year	
4	Thomas Hutchinson	1904	1905	1 Year	
5	Fred Forster	1905	1907	2 Years	
6	William Cousins	1907	1909	2 Years	
7	David Milne	1909	1912	3 Years	
8	Nelson Spencer	1912	1914	2 Years	
9	Mervyn Brown	1914	1915	1 Year (4 Years total)	
(3)	Archibald Hawthorne	1915	1917	2 Years (3 Years total)	
10	S. Cruikshank	1917	1918	1 Year	
(9)	Mervyn Brown	1918	1921	3 Years (4 Years Total)	
11	Walter Huckvale	1921	1926	5 Years	
12	Isaac Bullivant	1926	1939	13 Years	
13	Hector Lang	1939	1947	8 Years (9 Years total)	
14	W. M. (Mac) Rae	1947	1949	2 Years	
(13)	Hector Lang	1949	1950	1 Year (9 Years total)	
15	Wilson Riley	1950	1952	2 Years total	
16	Harry Veiner	1952	1966	14 Years (20 Years total)	
17	Chuck Meagher	1966	1968	2 Years	
(16)	Harry Veiner	1968	1974	6 Years (20 Years total)	
18	Ted Grimm	1974	1977	3 Years (24 Years total)	
19	Milt Reinhardt	1977	1980	3 Years	
(18)	Ted Grimm	1980	2001	21 Years (24 Years total)	
20	Garth Vallely	2001	2007	6 Years	
21	Norm Boucher	2007	2013	6 Years	
22	Ted Clugston	2013	2021	8 Years	
23	Linnsie Clark	2021	2024/2025 (Note: In March 2024, Clark was stripped of her mayoral powers under the Municipal Government Act, for violating the city's code of conduct by not treating the city manager with dignity and respect during a 2023 council meeting. The next municipal election is not until 2025, hence she will maintain her position but with reduced pay and restrictions on her ability to interact with the city administration. These restrictions were later found to be beyond what a Council acting properly should have done by Justice Nation and were removed in August of 2024, she was subsequently placed back to execute the full extent of her duties.)	4 Years, as of 2025 municipal elections.	
