= Pierre Malcom Guay =

Canadian politician

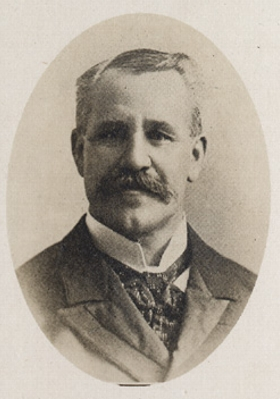

Member of the Canadian Parliament for Lévis
- In office 1885–1899
- Preceded by: Isidore-Noël Belleau
- Succeeded by: Louis-Jules Demers

Personal details
- Born: March 26, 1848 Saint-Romuald d'Etchemin, Canada East
- Died: February 19, 1899 (aged 50)
- Party: Liberal

Pierre Malcom Guay (March 26, 1848 – February 19, 1899) was a physician, surgeon and political figure in Quebec. He represented Lévis in the House of Commons of Canada from 1885 to 1899 as a Liberal member.

He was born in Saint-Romuald d'Etchemin, Canada East, the son of François Xavier Guay and Marie Adelaide Côté. Guay was educated at the Séminaire de Quebec and the Université Laval, where he received a M.D. In 1874, he married Marie Louise Antoinette Roy. He served on the town council for St-Romuald d'Etchemin and was mayor from 1886 to 1887. Guay was also a governor of the board of physicians and surgeons for Quebec. He was first elected to the House of Commons in an 1885 by-election held after Isidore-Noël Belleau was unseated following an appeal. Guay died in office at the age of 50.

== Electoral record ==
By-election on 14 April 1885 Belleau unseated on a judgement of the Supreme Court, 16 March 1885
| Party | Candidate | Votes |
| Liberal | Pierre Malcom Guay | acclaimed |

1887 Canadian federal election: Lévis
| Party | Candidate | Votes |
|---|---|---|
| Liberal | Pierre Malcom Guay | 2,170 |
| Conservative | Charles Darveau | 1,776 |

1891 Canadian federal election: Lévis
| Party | Candidate | Votes |
|---|---|---|
| Liberal | Pierre Malcom Guay | 2,075 |
| Conservative | E.T. Paquet | 1,794 |

1896 Canadian federal election: Lévis
| Party | Candidate | Votes |
|---|---|---|
| Liberal | Pierre Malcom Guay | 2,271 |
| Conservative | J.E.Gelley | 1,963 |
