= List of mayors of Lunenburg, Nova Scotia =

The Town of Lunenburg was incorporated in 1888. There have been 20 mayors of the town as of 2023.

== Mayors ==
- Augustus J. Wolff 1888-1891
- S. Watson Oxner 1891-1895
- Augustus J. Wolff 1895-1899
- Daniel J. Rudolf 1899-1902
- Allan R. Moreash 1902-1910
- Augustus J. Wolff 1910-1911
- John James Kinley 1911-1914
- J. Frank Hall 1914-1916
- William Duff 1916-1922
- Arthur W. Schwartz 1922-1930
- Wallace E. Knock 1930-1934
- Arthur W. Schwartz 1934-1946
- L.L. Hebb 1946-1948
- Douglas F. Adams 1948-1952
- F. Homer Zwicker 1952-1956
- Roy M. Whynacht 1956-1958
- R.G.A. Wood 1958-1971
- Sherman Zwicker 1971-1979
- Laurence Mawhinney 1979-2012
- Rachel Bailey 2012–2020
- Matt Risser 2020-May 9,2023
- Peter Mosher May 9-September 12, 2023 (acting mayor)
- Jamie Myra September 12, 2023-present
