= List of mayors of the Cape Breton Regional Municipality =

Mayor of Cape Breton Regional Municipality
- Incumbent; Cecil Clarke since October 30, 2024
- Style: His/Her Worship
- Member of: Regional Council
- Reports to: Regional Council
- Seat: Cape Breton Civic Centre
- Appointer: Direct election by residents
- Term length: 4 years
- Inaugural holder: John Coady
- Formation: August 1, 1995

This is a list of mayors of Cape Breton Regional Municipality, Nova Scotia, Canada. The region's first mayor John Coady was elected in 1995 when the region was created by the province through amalgamation of the previous municipal units.

== List ==
#	Mayor	Term start	Term end	Notes
1	John Coady	1 August 1995	20 October 1997	Previously Warden for Cape Breton County
2	David Muise (born 1949)	20 October 1997	20 October 2000	Previously MLA for Cape Breton West
3	John W. Morgan (born 1964)	20 October 2000	20 October 2012	
4	Cecil Clarke (born 1964)	20 October 2012	4 November 2020	Previously MLA for Cape Breton North
5	Amanda McDougall	5 November 2020	30 October 2024	Previously a regional councillor
–	Cecil Clarke	30 October 2024		Previously mayor (2012–2020)
