= Richard Guay =

Richard Guay may refer to:

- Richard Guay (politician) (born 1943), a politician in Quebec
- Richard Guay (film producer), American film producer
- Richard Guay (ice hockey), Canadian ice hockey goaltender who was drafted by the Philadelphia Flyers in the 1974 NHL amateur draft
