= List of mayors of Lévis, Quebec =

This is a list of mayors of the City of Lévis in the Province of Quebec, Canada.

- 1861 - 1870: Louis Carrier, first mayor
- 1870 - 1871: Georges Couture
- 1871 - 1874: Jacques Jobin
- 1874 - 1874: Prudent Grégoire Roy
- 1874 - 1884: Georges Couture
- 1884 - 1885: Pierre Lefrançois
- 1886 - 1890: Thimolaüs Beaulieu
- 1891 - 1896: Isidore-Noël Belleau
- 1896 - 1900: Joseph-Edmond Roy
- 1900 - 1902: H.-Edmond Dupré
- 1902 - 1905: Napoléon Lamontagne
- 1905 - 1906: Eusèbe Belleau
- 1906 - 1907: S.-Cléophas Auger
- 1907 - 1917: Alphonse Bernier
- 1917 - 1920: Noël Belleau
- 1920 - 1921: Joseph-K. Laflamme
- 1921 - 1927: Émile Demers
- 1927 - 1929: J.-Cléophas Blouin
- 1929 - 1933: Joseph Leblond
- 1933 - 1943: Sylvio Durand
- 1943 - 1957: Adélard Bégin
- 1957 - 1966: Clément-M. Thivierge
- 1966 - 1990: Vincent F. Chagnon
- 1990 - 1994: Robert Guay, former Lauzon mayor
- 1994 - 1998: Denis Guay
- 1998 - 2005: Jean Garon
- 2005 - 2013: Danielle Roy Marinelli
- 2013 - 2025: Gilles Lehouillier
- 2025 - present: Steven Blaney

== See also ==
- Lévis, Quebec
