= Émile Fortin =

Canadian politician

The Honourable Émile Fortin

Member of Parliament for Lévis
- In office July 1930 – August 1935

Senator for De la Durantaye, Quebec
- In office 14 August 1935 – 18 May 1936
- Appointed by: R. B. Bennett
- Preceded by: Jules Tessier
- Succeeded by: Fernand Fafard

Personal details
- Born: 18 February 1878 Lévis, Quebec, Canada
- Died: 18 May 1936 (aged 58) Quebec City, Quebec, Canada
- Party: Conservative
- Spouse(s): Marguerite Belleau m. 5 June 1906; Jacqueline Belleau (until his death)
- Profession: Pharmacist, physician

Émile Fortin (18 February 1878 – 18 May 1936) was a Conservative member of the House of Commons of Canada. He was born in Lévis, Quebec, and became a pharmacist and physician.

Fortin, a graduate of Université Laval, was a member of the Medical Society of Quebec.

He was first elected to Parliament at the Lévis riding in the 1930 general election after a previous unsuccessful campaign there in the 1926 federal election.

He was appointed to the Senate for the De la Durantaye, Quebec, division on 14 August 1935 but remained in that role for less than a year, until his death at a Quebec City hospital on 18 May 1936. He had been ill with pneumonia since that March and his condition worsened with a subsequent heart attack.

1926 Canadian federal election: Lévis
Party	Candidate	Votes
Liberal	Joseph-Étienne Dussault	7,127
Conservative	Émile Fortin	5,838
