= Louis Julien Demers =

Canadian politician

Member of the Canadian Parliament for Lévis
- In office 1899–1905
- Preceded by: Pierre Malcom Guay
- Succeeded by: Louis Auguste Carrier

Personal details
- Born: December 9, 1848 St-Romuald, Canada East
- Died: April 29, 1905 (aged 56) St-Romuald, Quebec
- Party: Liberal

Louis Julien Demers (December 9, 1848 – April 29, 1905) was a merchant and political figure in Quebec. He represented Lévis in the House of Commons of Canada from 1899 to 1905 as a Liberal.

He was born in St-Romuald, Canada East, the son of Benjamin Demers and Felicite Carrier, and was educated at the Collège de Lévis. In 1883, he married Elmina Giroux. Demers was first elected to the House of Commons in an 1899 by-election held after the death of Pierre Malcom Guay. He died in office at St-Romuald at the age of 56 after a long illness.

== Electoral record ==
1900 Canadian federal election: Lévis
Party	Candidate	Votes
Liberal	Louis Julien Demers	2,455
Conservative	J.A. Dumontier	1,630

1904 Canadian federal election: Lévis
Party	Candidate	Votes
Liberal	Louis Julien Demers	2,642
Conservative	Joseph Isaac Lavery	1,677

By-election on 22 March 1899 Guay's death, 19 February 1899
Party	Candidate	Votes
Liberal	Louis Julien Demers	acclaimed
