= Raynald Guay =

Canadian politician

Official 1979 portrait

Raynald Joseph Albert Guay (31 March 1933 – 26 January 2017) was a Canadian politician. Guay served as a Liberal party member of the House of Commons of Canada. Born in Lauzon, Quebec, he was a lawyer by career.

He represented the Lévis, Quebec electoral district which he first won in the 1963 federal election. After successive re-elections there in 1965, 1968, 1972, 1974, 1979 and 1980 federal elections, he resigned from national politics on 29 August 1980 to accept an appointment to the Anti-Dumping Tribunal. Guay served full terms from the 27th to the 31st Canadian Parliaments and for the initial months of the 32nd Canadian Parliament. He died on 26 January 2017.

== Electoral record ==
1963 Canadian federal election: Lévis
Party	Candidate	Votes
Liberal	Raynald Guay	9,634
Social Credit	J.-A. Roy	9,315
Progressive Conservative	Jean-Marie Morin	4,563

1965 Canadian federal election: Lévis
Party	Candidate	Votes
Liberal	Raynald Guay	10,895
Ralliement créditiste	J.-A. Roy	9,839
Progressive Conservative	Raymond Doré	2,175
New Democratic	Jean-Guy Ramsay	1,156

1968 Canadian federal election: Lévis
Party	Candidate	Votes
Liberal	Raynald Guay	12,227
Ralliement créditiste	Henri Borgia	9,887
Progressive Conservative	Paul-Émile Dubé	9,523
New Democratic	Jean-Guy Ramsay	1,189

1972 Canadian federal election: Lévis
Party	Candidate	Votes
Liberal	Raynald Guay	17,588
Social Credit	Jean Ricard	10,256
Progressive Conservative	Paul-Émile Dubé	9,848
New Democratic	André Therrien	1,593
No affiliation	Serge De Beaumont	519

1974 Canadian federal election: Lévis
Party	Candidate	Votes
Liberal	Raynald Guay	20,348
Progressive Conservative	André Godbout	11,485
New Democratic	Gérard Dionne	4,279
Marxist–Leninist	Richard Allard	404

1979 Canadian federal election: Lévis
Party	Candidate	Votes
Liberal	Raynald Guay	31,753
Social Credit	André Godbout	11,403
Progressive Conservative	Roland Garneau	6,726
New Democratic	Gérard Dionne	3,392
Union populaire	Paul Biron	841
Marxist–Leninist	Richard Allard	341

1980 Canadian federal election: Lévis
Party	Candidate	Votes
Liberal	Raynald Guay	35,519
New Democratic	Daniel Vachon	6,459
Progressive Conservative	Roland Garneau	4,759
Social Credit	Jacques Audet	3,385
Rhinoceros	Gervais Prime Richard	2,652
Union populaire	Yves Lavoie	264
Marxist–Leninist	RichardAllard	118
Independent	Robert Nolet	101
lop.parl.ca
