= Steven Blaney =

Canadian politician (born 1965)

His Worship the Honourable Steven Blaney PC
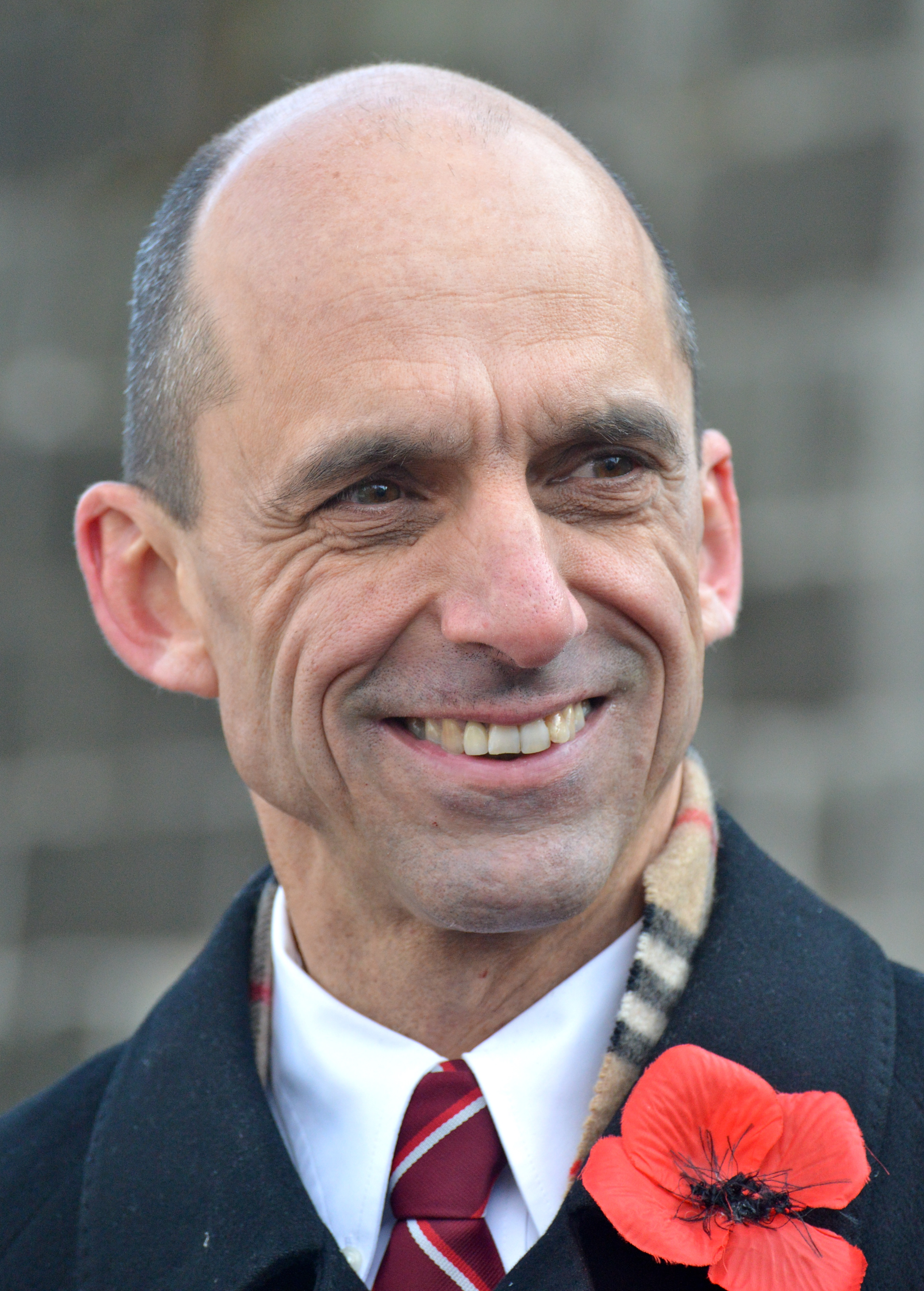
- Blaney in 2014

Mayor of Lévis
- Incumbent
- Assumed office November 10, 2025
- Preceded by: Gilles Lehouillier

Minister of Public Safety and Emergency Preparedness
- In office July 15, 2013 – November 4, 2015
- Prime Minister: Stephen Harper
- Preceded by: Vic Toews
- Succeeded by: Ralph Goodale

Minister of Veterans Affairs
- In office May 18, 2011 – July 15, 2013
- Prime Minister: Stephen Harper
- Preceded by: Jean-Pierre Blackburn
- Succeeded by: Julian Fantino

Chair of the Standing Committee on Official Languages
- In office May 31, 2007 – June 20, 2011
- Prime Minister: Stephen Harper
- Preceded by: Guy Lauzon
- Succeeded by: Michael Chong

Member of the Canadian Parliament for Bellechasse—Les Etchemins—Lévis (Lévis—Bellechasse; 2006–2015)
- In office January 23, 2006 – September 20, 2021
- Preceded by: Réal Lapierre
- Succeeded by: Dominique Vien

Personal details
- Born: April 8, 1965 (age 61) Sherbrooke, Quebec, Canada
- Party: Conservative (federal); CAQ (provincial); Prospérité Lévis (municipal)
- Spouse: Marie Bouchard
- Education: University of Quebec, Montreal; University of Sherbrooke
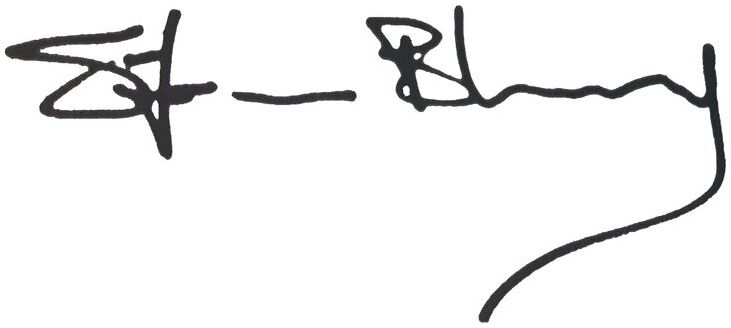
- Signature

Steven Blaney PC (born April 8, 1965) is a Canadian businessman and politician who has been the mayor of Lévis, Quebec, since 2025. A member of the Conservative Party, he served as the Minister of Public Safety Canada from 2013 to 2015 and previously as the Minister of Veterans Affairs and Minister of State for La Francophonie in the cabinet of Prime Minister Stephen Harper from 2011 to 2013. He represented the Québec riding of Lévis—Bellechasse in the Canadian House of Commons from 2006 to 2021. Despite his anglophone-sounding name, Blaney is a Francophone; his English has a marked Quebecois accent. He ran in the 2017 Conservative Party of Canada leadership election, being eliminated in the 7th round of voting.

== Early life ==
Blaney was born in Sherbrooke, Quebec, and was raised in Sainte-Marie-de-Beauce. Today, he lives in Lévis along with his wife, Marie Bouchard, and his two children, William-Antoine and Alexandra. For 15 years, he worked in Quebec's engineering sector, in water purification and energy efficiency. Blaney started up two companies specializing in environmental technology and carried out many environmental projects. Blaney was an active member of Réseau Environnement, Canada's largest group of environmental professionals; he presided over the organization's Québec-Chaudière-Appalaches chapter between 2003 and 2006.

== Political career ==
=== Provincial politics ===
Blaney entered politics during the Quebec general elections of 1998; he was a candidate of the Action démocratique du Québec in the provincial electoral district of Beauce-Nord. Blaney arrived in third place, behind Normand Poulin (PLQ) and Gaston Gourde (PQ), collecting 14.42% of the votes.

=== Federal politics ===
Following many years of activity with the Conservative Party in Quebec, Blaney decided to run for the first time for a seat at the House of Commons during the 2006 federal elections in the riding of Lévis-Bellechasse. He successfully defeated Bloc Québécois incumbent Réal Lapierre with 46.40% of the votes. Blaney joined nine other Quebec MPs in Ottawa, following the Conservative Party breakthrough in Quebec that year.

After his victory in 2006, Blaney was appointed vice-president of the Quebec Conservative caucus. On May 31, 2007, he was selected as Chair of the Standing Committee on Official Languages; a position that he held till September 2010.

Moreover, he joined various other committees, ranging from Indian Affairs to Industry, Science and Technology, including the Environment and Sustainable Development Committee. In January 2006, Blaney visited Canadian soldiers in Kandahar as part of a trip organized by the Standing Committee on National Defence for its members. He is also vice-chair of the Canada-France Interparliamentary Association.

After his reelection in 2008, Blaney became the new President of the Quebec Conservative caucus. Furthermore, he promised to offset the greenhouse gas emissions resulting from his activities through tree planting, in cooperation with Tree Canada and the Comité de restauration de la rivière Etchemin, thus becoming the first carbon neutral MP.

On May 2, 2011, Blaney was re-elected for a third mandate as representative of Lévis-Bellechasse at the House of Commons earning 43.95% of the votes, beating the NDP candidate with more than 10% of the votes, receiving 1065 more votes than during the 2008 election.

==== Minister of Veterans Affairs ====
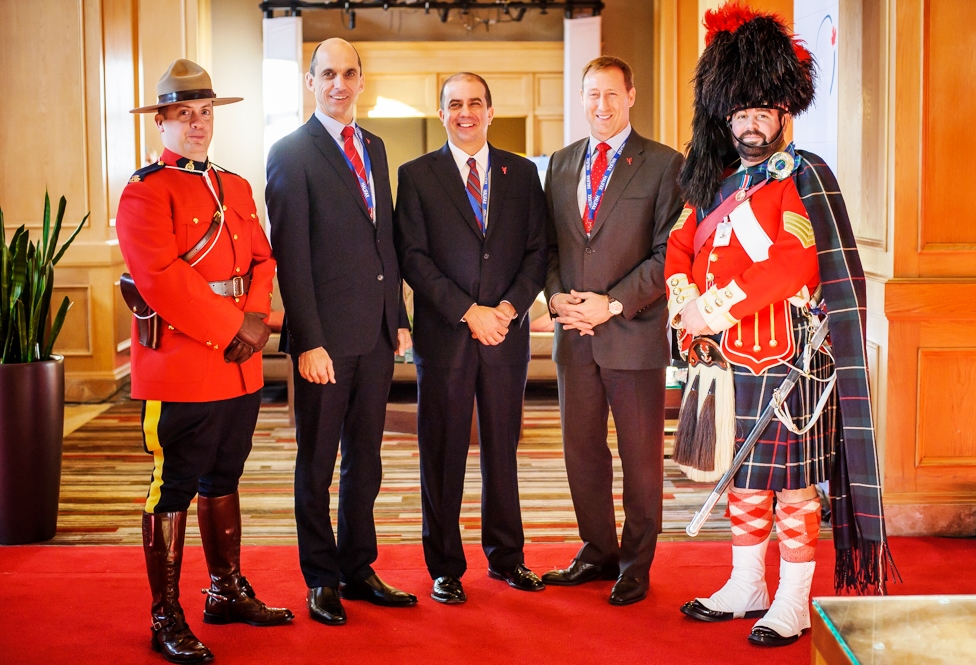
Steven Blaney at Halifax International Security Forum 2014

On May 18, 2011, Blaney was appointed to the cabinet of Prime Minister Stephen Harper. He assumed the position of Minister of Veterans Affairs taking over this role from Jean-Pierre Blackburn, who was defeated in the May 2 election. Blaney also sits as a member of the Cabinet Committee on Social Affairs and the Cabinet Committee on Foreign Affairs and Defence. Blaney carried on the policies launched by his two conservative predecessors. During the summer following the elections, Blaney announced regulatory changes to the Enhanced Veterans Charter Act to revamp the pension system that was set up following World War I and World War II. The New Veterans Charter (NVC) was designed to provide Veterans with the support they required to successfully transition from military to civilian life.

As Minister of Veterans Affairs, Blaney can be credited for improving the benefits and services for Veterans suffering from severe diagnosed medical conditions or/and disabilities. He also launched the Helmet to Hardhats Program which assists many former Canadian Forces members to find well-paid jobs in the construction sector. Preoccupied by the modernization of Veterans Affairs Canada, Blaney initiated the Cutting Red Tape for Veterans initiative aimed at simplifying administrative processes for Veterans and at making all of Veterans Affairs Canada's forms and decisions comprehensible for all.

In March 2011, Blaney told a meeting of seniors, "Et rappelez-vous, le ciel est bleu, l'enfer est rouge!" (And remember—Heaven is blue, Hell is red!), referring to the colours of the Conservative and Liberal parties. The slogan was used by the government of Maurice Duplessis in the mid-20th century during the period of church-state collaboration in Quebec known as the Grande Noirceur and even before in the 1850s.

==== Minister of Public Safety ====
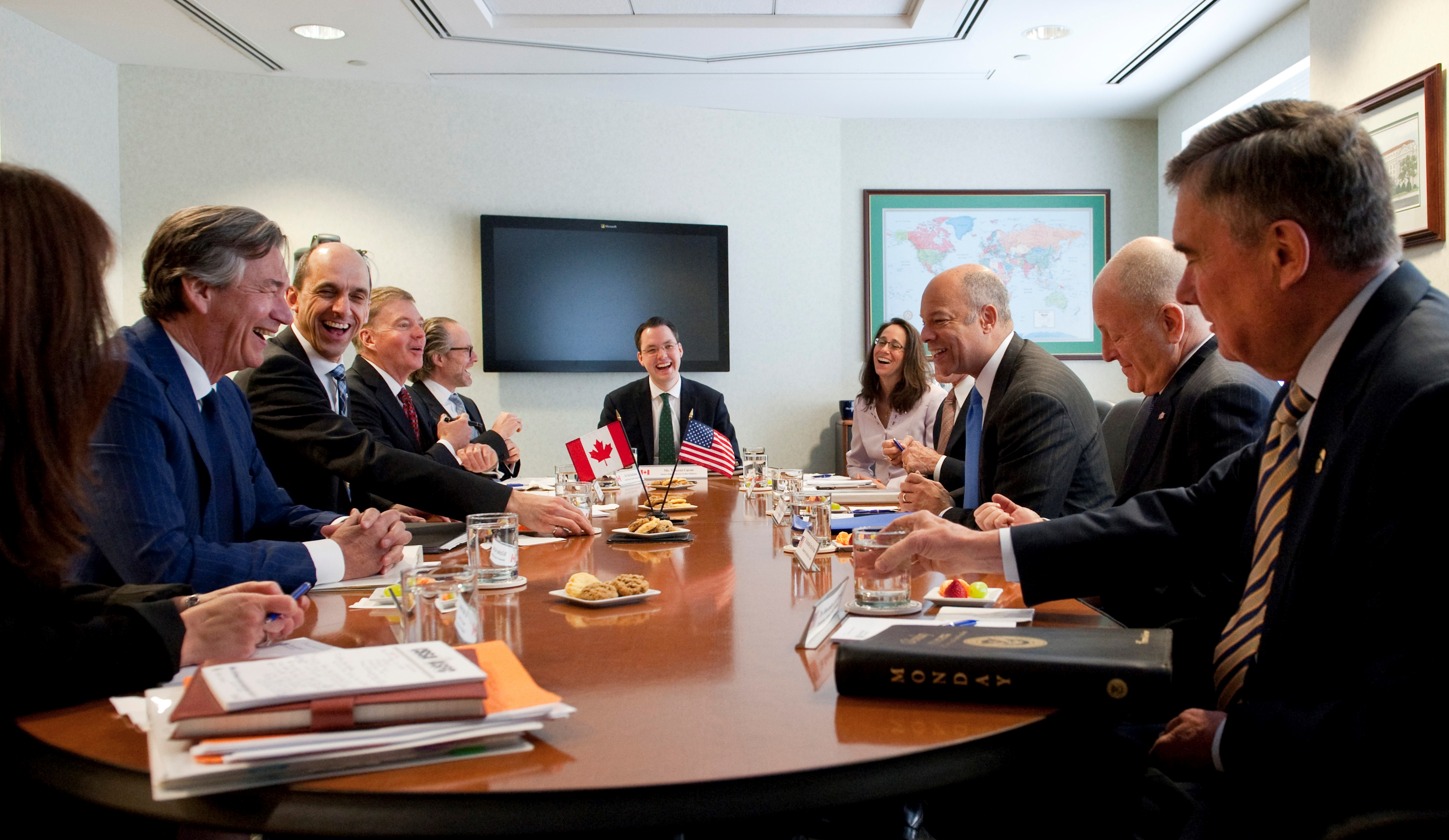
Canadian Minister of Public Safety and Emergency Preparedness Steven Blaney meets with U.S. Secretary of Homeland Security Jeh Johnson

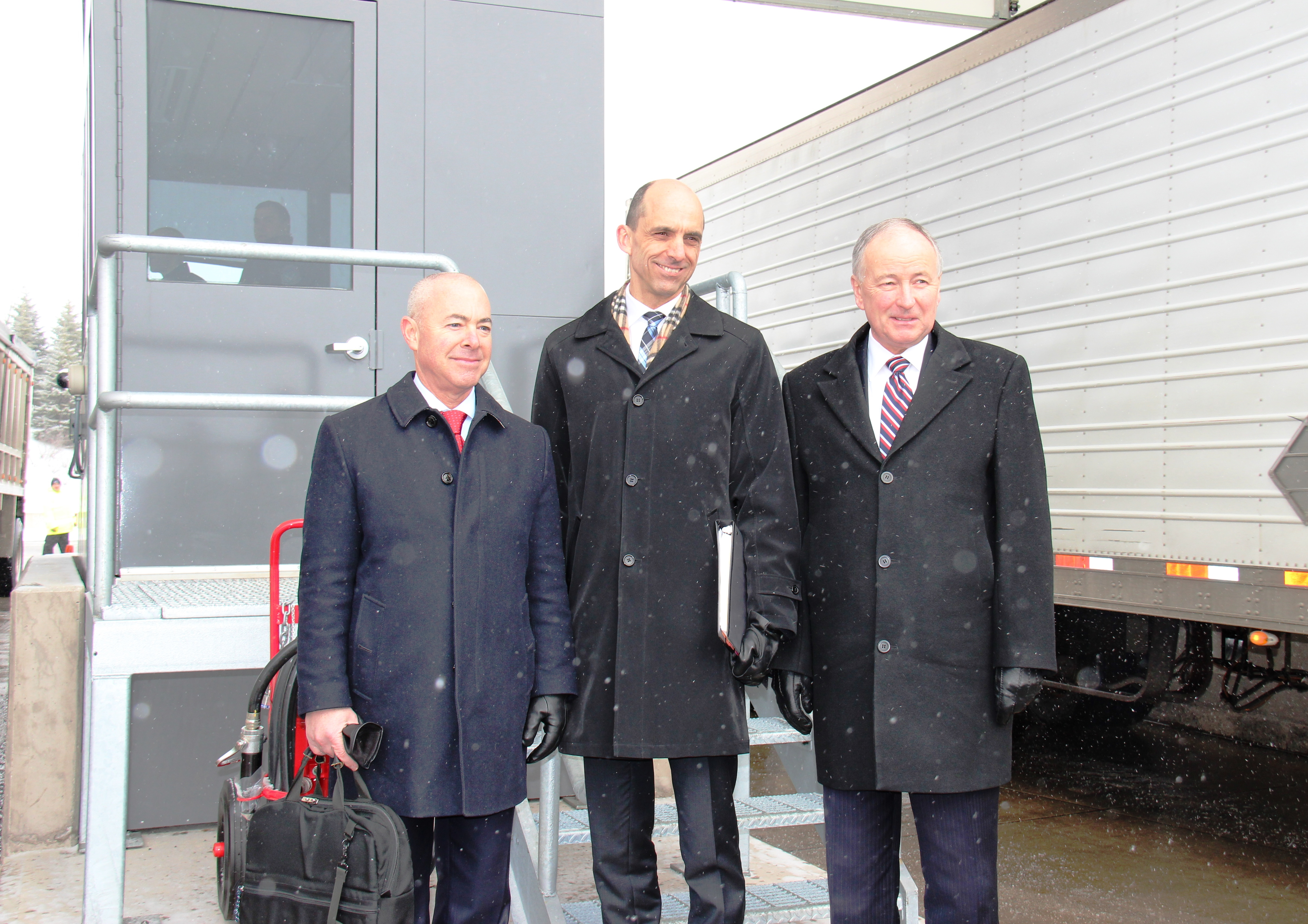
Canadian Minister of National Defence & MP for Niagara Falls Rob Nicholson (R), Minister of Public Safety and Emergency Preparedness Steven Blaney (C) and U.S. Deputy Secretary of Homeland Security Alejandro Mayorkas on the Ontario side of Peace Bridge

On July 15, 2013, Blaney assumed the position of Minister of Public Safety, taking over this role from Vic Toews who announced his retirement on July 9, 2013. The announcement of the appointment was made during Prime Minister Stephen Harper's 2013 Cabinet shuffle.

On August 13, 2013, in response to a brief from Dennis Edney arguing that Omar Khadr should be held in a youth facility not an adult prison, because he was a minor when the crimes he was convicted of occurred, Blaney asserted that the Harper government would fight to keep Khadr in adult prisoner for the full term of his sentence.

On January 30, 2015, Steven Blaney introduced Bill C-51, the Anti-terrorism Act, 2015. This bill was tabled in response to jihadist terrorist attacks on Canada, namely the 2014 Saint-Jean-sur-Richelieu ramming attack and the 2014 shootings at Parliament Hill, Ottawa.

The Bill has 6 key elements, namely:

- Creating a criminal offence for the advocacy or promotion of terrorism,
- Allow judges to issue seizure orders for terrorist propaganda,
- Allow CSIS to engage in threat disruption,
- Enhance the Passenger Protect Program to stop known terrorists from boarding planes,
- Lower the threshold for obtaining terrorism-related peace bond, and
- Enable the sharing of national security information across relevant agencies

Notably, during the debate on this legislation, Blaney said “the important point that often seems to be forgotten around this place, that it is the jihadis who represent a threat, not our police officers and those protecting us”.

The legislation received Royal Assent on June 18, 2015.

On October 7, 2014, Steven Blaney introduced Bill C-42, the Common Sense Firearms Licensing Act. There were eight measures designed to make Canada's firearms laws more safe and sensible. These measures included:

- A six-month grace period at the end of the five-year licence period to stop people from immediately becoming criminalized for paperwork delays around license renewals;
- Streamline the licensing system by eliminating the Possession Only Licence (POL) and converting all existing POLs to Possession and Acquisition Licences (PALs);
- Make classroom participation in firearms safety training mandatory for first-time licence applicants;
- Amend the Criminal Code to strengthen the provisions relating to orders prohibiting the possession of firearms where a person is convicted of an offence involving domestic violence;
- End needless paperwork around Authorizations to Transport by making them a condition of a licence for certain routine and lawful activities;
- Provide for the discretionary authority of Chief Firearms Officers to be subject to limit by regulation;
- Authorize firearms import information sharing when restricted and prohibited firearms are imported into Canada by businesses; and,
- Allow the Government to have the final say on classification decisions, following the receipt of independent expert advice.

These measures were supported by hunting and outdoors groups from across the country, such as the Ontario Federation of Anglers and Hunters. They were also supported by many frontline law enforcement officers.

==== Opposition ====
He was re-elected in the 2015 election. On October 14, 2016, Blaney announced that he was running for the leadership of the Conservative Party of Canada, though he eventually lost to Andrew Scheer. Blaney came 9th out of 14 candidates. During his leadership campaign, he ran on supporting the ban on wearing the niqab while voting, taking the citizenship oath, or by federal public servants, even if such a ban would require invoking the notwithstanding clause of the Constitution in order to override the Charter of Rights and Freedoms. He also advocates testing of would-be citizens on "their understanding and appreciation of Canada's core principles." He did not seek re-election in the 2021 Canadian federal election.

== Electoral record ==
=== Federal ===
2019 Canadian federal election: Bellechasse—Les Etchemins—Lévis
Party	Candidate	Votes	%	±%	Expenditures
Conservative	Steven Blaney	32,283	50.09	-0.83	$56,210.72
Bloc Québécois	Sébastien Bouchard-Théberge	14,754	22.89	+11.36	$5,276.21
Liberal	Laurence Harvey	10,734	16.66	-4.05	$12,368.08
New Democratic	Chamroeun Khuon	3,256	5.05	-8.55	$3,070.83
Green	André Voyer	1,925	2.99	-0.26	none listed
People's	Marc Johnston	1,307	2.03	-	$0.00
Christian Heritage	Yves Gilbert	188	0.29	-	none listed
Total valid votes/expense limit		64,447	98.30	-1.70	-
Total rejected ballots		1,113	1.70	+0.81	
Turnout		65,560	69.33	+0.71	
Eligible voters		94,558			
Conservative hold		Swing		-6.10	
Source: Elections Canada

2015 Canadian federal election: Bellechasse—Les Etchemins—Lévis
Party	Candidate	Votes	%	±%	Expenditures
Conservative	Steven Blaney	31,872	50.92	+7.17	–
Liberal	Jacques Turgeon	12,961	20.71	+14.89	–
New Democratic	Jean-Luc Daigle	8,516	13.6	-20.21	–
Bloc Québécois	Antoine Dubé	7,217	11.53	-3.36	–
Green	André Bélisle	2,032	3.25	+1.71	–
Total valid votes/Expense limit		62,598	100.0		$234,497.01
Total rejected ballots		824	0.89	–	
Turnout		63,422	68.62	–	
Eligible voters		92,420			
Conservative hold		Swing		+13.7	
Source: Elections Canada

2011 Canadian federal election: Lévis—Bellechasse
Party	Candidate	Votes	%	±%	Expenditures
Conservative	Steven Blaney	25,850	43.95	-1.95	$85,522.71
New Democratic	Nicole Laliberté	19,890	33.81	+22.97	$336.36
Bloc Québécois	Danielle-Maude Gosselin	8,757	14.89	-10.57	$44,495.06
Liberal	Francis Laforesterie	3,421	5.82	-9.24	$16,904.21
Green	Sacha Dougé	903	1.54	-1.00	none listed
Total valid votes/Expense limit		58,821	100.0		$94.740.90
Total rejected, unmarked and declined ballots		808	1.36	-0.19	
Turnout		59,629	65.88	+3.43	
Eligible voters		90,515			
Conservative hold		Swing		-12.46	

2008 Canadian federal election: Lévis—Bellechasse
Party	Candidate	Votes	%	±%	Expenditures
Conservative	Steven Blaney	24,785	45.90	-0.50	$66,280.10
Bloc Québécois	Guy Bergeron	13,747	25.46	-3.56	$18,536.02
Liberal	Pauline Côté	8,130	15.06	+6.87	$14,138.27
New Democratic	Gabriel Biron	5,856	10.84	+6.21	none listed
Green	Lynne Champoux-Williams	1,370	2.54	-1.56	none listed
Marxist–Leninist	Normand Fournier	113	0.21	–	none listed
Total valid votes/Expense limit		54,001	100.0		$90,335
Total rejected, unmarked and declined ballots		848	1.55	+0.57	
Turnout		54,849	62.45	-3.47	
Eligible voters		87,830			
Conservative hold		Swing		+1.53	

2006 Canadian federal election: Lévis—Bellechasse
Party	Candidate	Votes	%	±%	Expenditures
Conservative	Steven Blaney	25,940	46.40	+27.35	$59,351.14
Bloc Québécois	Réal Lapierre	16,223	29.02	-15.31	$61,706.32
Liberal	Shirley Baril	4,581	8.19	-19.43	$9,831.42
Independent	Normand Cadrin	4,275	7.65	–	$15,519.63
New Democratic	Éric Boucher	2,590	4.63	+0.77	$868.27
Green	Mathieu Castonguay	2,293	4.10	-0.69	$3,066.75
Total valid votes/Expense limit		55,902	100.0		$83,486
Total rejected, unmarked and declined ballots		551	0.98	-1.24	
Turnout		56,453	65.92		
Eligible voters		85,635			
Conservative gain from Bloc Québécois		Swing		+21.33	

=== Provincial ===
1998 Quebec general election: Beauce-Nord
Party	Candidate	Votes	%	±%
Liberal	Normand Poulin	12,137	46.39	+0.58
Parti Québécois	Gaston Gourde	10,126	38.70	-6.85
Action démocratique	Steven Blaney	3,772	14.42	–
Socialist Democracy	Serge Foisy	127	0.49	-5.62
Total valid votes		26,162	100.00	–
Liberal hold		Swing		+3.72

28th Canadian Ministry (2006–2015) – Cabinet of Stephen Harper
Cabinet posts (2)
Predecessor	Office	Successor
Jean-Pierre Blackburn	Minister of Veterans Affairs; 2011–2013	Julian Fantino
Vic Toews	Minister of Public Safety and Emergency Preparedness; 2013–2015	Ralph Goodale
