= Gabriel Fontaine =

Canadian politician

Gabriel Fontaine (born 17 September 1940 in Saint-Lambert-de-Lauzon, Quebec) was a Progressive Conservative member of the House of Commons of Canada. He was a chartered administrator and consultant by career.

He represented the Quebec riding of Lévis where he was first elected in the 1984 federal election and re-elected in 1988, therefore becoming a member in the 33rd and 34th Canadian Parliaments. Fontaine did not seek a third term in Parliament and left federal politics in 1993.

1984 Canadian federal election: Lévis
Party	Candidate	Votes
Progressive Conservative	Gabriel Fontaine	32,338
Liberal	Gaston Gourde	17,283
New Democratic	Jean-Paul Harney	12,076
Parti nationaliste	Antoine Dubé	1,649
Rhinoceros	Raymond Emiliano Marquis	1,630
Social Credit	Jean-Paul Rhéaume	216

1988 Canadian federal election: Lévis
Party	Candidate	Votes
Progressive Conservative	Gabriel Fontaine	33,673
Liberal	Denis Sonier	13,002
New Democratic	Jean-Paul Harney	11,501
Social Credit	Jean-Paul Rhéaume	445
