= List of federal by-elections in Canada =

This is a list of by-elections in Canada since Confederation. By-elections are held to fill a vacancy in the Canadian House of Commons. Vacancies are caused by the death or resignation of a Member of Parliament or, more rarely, by the voiding of an election result by a court or as the result of an MP being expelled from the House of Commons. MPs have been expelled four times — Louis Riel (Provencher) was expelled in 1874 and again in 1875 for being a fugitive, Fred Rose (Cartier) was expelled in 1947 after having been convicted under the Official Secrets Act for having allegedly spied for the Soviet Union. In 1891, Thomas McGreevy (Quebec West) was expelled after being sentenced to a year in prison following his conviction for defrauding the government.

When a seat becomes vacant the Speaker of the House of Commons of Canada issues a "Speaker's warrant" informing the Chief Electoral Officer of Canada of a vacancy. The Chief Electoral Officer must issue a writ of election "between the 11th and 180th days after the Chief Electoral Officer receives the warrant from the Speaker". The election date is then set for not less than 36 days and not more than 50 days after the issuance of the writ. If a vacancy occurs less than nine months before a fixed election date, then no by-election is held and the seat remains vacant until the general election.

This list below includes ministerial by-elections which occurred due to the requirement that Members of Parliament recontest their seats upon being appointed to Cabinet. These by-elections were almost always uncontested. This requirement was abolished in 1931.

== Notable by-elections ==
- 1942 York South by-election in which the Co-operative Commonwealth Federation's Joseph Noseworthy upset Conservative leader and former prime minister Arthur Meighen's attempt to return to the House of Commons
- Defence Minister Andrew McNaughton's defeat in the 1945 Grey North by-election
- The 1949 by-election in Kamouraska where the Liberals, who had won the riding by a 55.8 percentage point margin in the previous general election, were defeated by the Independent Liberal candidate in the by-election
- The 1943 Cartier by-election which the Liberals lost to the Labor-Progressive Party's Fred Rose
- Walter Pitman's 1960 by-election victory in Peterborough as a New Party candidate, which was a catalyst for the creation of the New Democratic Party
- Deborah Grey's 1989 by-election victory in Beaver River in which she won the Reform Party of Canada's first seat
- Gilles Duceppe's 1990 upset by-election victory in Laurier—Sainte-Marie on behalf of the newly formed Bloc Québécois.
- Thomas Mulcair became only the second New Democrat ever elected from Quebec and the first in seventeen years after winning the 2007 Outremont by-election
- The 2026 Terrebonne by-election which was called due to the Supreme Court nullifying the previous election result in-which the Liberals had defeated the Bloc Québécois by one vote

== 45th Parliament (2025–present) ==
Electoral district	Date vacated	Date writ issued	By-election date	Previous incumbent	Party	Cause	Winner	Party	Retained
Battle River—Crowfoot	June 17, 2025 (vacant for 61 days)	June 30, 2025	August 18, 2025	Damien Kurek	Conservative	Resigned to provide a seat for Pierre Poilievre.	Pierre Poilievre	Conservative	Yes
University—Rosedale	January 9, 2026 (vacant for 94 days)	March 8, 2026	April 13, 2026	Chrystia Freeland	Liberal	Resigned after her appointment as an economic adviser to Ukrainian President Volodymyr Zelenskyy.	Danielle Martin	Liberal	Yes
Scarborough Southwest	February 2, 2026 (vacant for 70 days)	March 8, 2026	April 13, 2026	Bill Blair	Liberal	Resigned after appointment as Canada's high commissioner to the U.K.	Doly Begum	Liberal	Yes
Terrebonne	February 13, 2026; Warrant issued February 16, 2026 (vacant for 59 days)	March 8, 2026	April 13, 2026	Tatiana Auguste	Liberal	Previous election result declared void by Supreme Court due to an error by Elections Canada in preparing mail-in ballots.	Tatiana Auguste	Liberal	Yes
North Vancouver—Capilano	June 22, 2026 (vacant for 71 days)	July 26, 2026	August 31, 2026	Jonathan Wilkinson	Liberal	Resigned to accept appointment as ambassador of Canada to the European Union	Braeden Caley	Liberal	Yes
Beaches—East York	July 7, 2026 (vacant for 56 days)	July 26, 2026	August 31, 2026	Nate Erskine-Smith	Liberal	Resigned	Tanveer Shahnawaz	Liberal	Yes
Chicoutimi—Le Fjord	July 9, 2026 (vacant for 54 days)	July 26, 2026	August 31, 2026	Richard Martel	Conservative	Resigned as MP upon appointment to the Senate of Canada	Daniel Gobeil	Liberal	No
Saint-Hyacinthe—Bagot—Acton	June 22, 2026 (vacant for 71 days)	On or before December 19, 2026	On or before February 1, 2027	Simon-Pierre Savard-Tremblay	Independent (Bloc Québécois before May 28, 2026)	Resigned to run for the Parti Québécois in 2026 Quebec general election	TBD	TBD	TBD
Scarborough North	August 17, 2026 (vacant for 15 days)	On or before February 13, 2027	On or before April 5, 2027	Shaun Chen	Liberal	Resigned due to personal health issues.	TBD	TBD	TBD
Rosemont—La Petite-Patrie	August 26, 2026 (vacant for 6 days)	On or before February 22, 2027	On or before April 12, 2027	Alexandre Boulerice	Independent (New Democratic before April 27, 2026)	Resigned to run for Québec solidaire in 2026 Quebec general election	TBD	TBD	TBD
Laurier—Sainte-Marie	August 28, 2026 (vacant for 4 days)	On or before March 2, 2027	On or before April 15, 2027	Steven Guilbeault	Liberal	Resigned to resume environmental activism outside parliament	TBD	TBD	TBD
Yorkton—Melville	August 31, 2026 (vacant for 1 day)	TBA	TBA	Cathay Wagantall	Conservative	Resigned for personal reasons	TBD	TBD	TBD

=== Expected ===
Electoral district	Incumbent	Party	Cause
Brantford—Brant South—Six Nations	Larry Brock	Conservative	Resigning on September 18 to take up a position in the crown attorney's office.

== 44th Parliament (2021–2025) ==
Electoral district	Date vacated	Date writ issued	By-election date	Previous incumbent	Party	Cause	Winner	Party	Retained
Mississauga—Lakeshore	May 27, 2022	November 6, 2022	December 12, 2022	Sven Spengemann	Liberal	Resigned to accept a position with the United Nations	Charles Sousa	Liberal	Yes
Winnipeg South Centre	December 12, 2022	May 14, 2023	June 19, 2023	Jim Carr	Liberal	Death (multiple myeloma and kidney failure)	Ben Carr	Liberal	Yes
Oxford	January 28, 2023	May 14, 2023	June 19, 2023	Dave MacKenzie	Conservative	Retirement	Arpan Khanna	Conservative	Yes
Portage—Lisgar	February 28, 2023	May 14, 2023	June 19, 2023	Candice Bergen	Conservative	Resignation	Branden Leslie	Conservative	Yes
Notre-Dame-de-Grâce—Westmount	March 8, 2023	May 14, 2023	June 19, 2023	Marc Garneau	Liberal	Retirement	Anna Gainey	Liberal	Yes
Calgary Heritage	December 31, 2022	June 18, 2023	July 24, 2023	Bob Benzen	Conservative	Resigned to return to the private sector	Shuvaloy Majumdar	Conservative	Yes
Durham	August 1, 2023	January 28, 2024	March 4, 2024	Erin O'Toole	Conservative	Resignation	Jamil Jivani	Conservative	Yes
Toronto—St. Paul's	January 16, 2024	May 19, 2024	June 24, 2024	Carolyn Bennett	Liberal	Resigned to accept appointment as Ambassador to Denmark	Don Stewart	Conservative	No
LaSalle—Émard—Verdun	February 1, 2024	July 28, 2024	September 16, 2024	David Lametti	Liberal	Resigned to join law firm	Louis-Philippe Sauvé	Bloc Québécois	No
Elmwood—Transcona	March 31, 2024	July 28, 2024	September 16, 2024	Daniel Blaikie	New Democratic	Resigned to work in Premier of Manitoba Wab Kinew's office	Leila Dance	New Democratic	Yes
Cloverdale—Langley City	May 27, 2024	November 10, 2024	December 16, 2024	John Aldag	Liberal	Resigned to run as the BC NDP candidate for Langley-Abbotsford in the 2024 British Columbia general election.	Tamara Jansen	Conservative	No

== 43rd Parliament (2019–2021) ==
By-election	Date	Incumbent	Party	Winner	Party	Cause	Retained
Toronto Centre	October 26, 2020	Bill Morneau	Liberal	Marci Ien	Liberal	Resigned to run for Secretary-General of the OECD	Yes
York Centre	October 26, 2020	Michael Levitt	Liberal	Ya'ara Saks	Liberal	Resigned to become CEO of the Canadian Friends of Simon Wiesenthal Centre for Holocaust Studies	Yes

== 42nd Parliament (2015–2019) ==
By-election	Date	Incumbent	Party	Winner	Party	Cause	Retained
Nanaimo—Ladysmith	May 6, 2019	Sheila Malcolmson	New Democratic	Paul Manly	Green	Resigned to enter provincial politics	No
York—Simcoe	February 25, 2019	Peter Van Loan	Conservative	Scot Davidson	Conservative	Resigned	Yes
Burnaby South	February 25, 2019	Kennedy Stewart	New Democratic	Jagmeet Singh	New Democratic	Resigned to run for Mayor of Vancouver	Yes
Outremont	February 25, 2019	Tom Mulcair	New Democratic	Rachel Bendayan	Liberal	Resigned to accept an academic appointment	No
Leeds—Grenville— Thousand Islands and Rideau Lakes	December 3, 2018	Gord Brown	Conservative	Michael Barrett	Conservative	Death (heart attack)	Yes
Chicoutimi—Le Fjord	June 18, 2018	Denis Lemieux	Liberal	Richard Martel	Conservative	Resigned	No
Battlefords—Lloydminster	December 11, 2017	Gerry Ritz	Conservative	Rosemarie Falk	Conservative	Resigned	Yes
South Surrey—White Rock	December 11, 2017	Dianne Watts	Conservative	Gordie Hogg	Liberal	Resigned to seek the leadership of the British Columbia Liberal Party	No
Bonavista—Burin—Trinity	December 11, 2017	Judy Foote	Liberal	Churence Rogers	Liberal	Resigned due to family reasons	Yes
Scarborough—Agincourt	December 11, 2017	Arnold Chan	Liberal	Jean Yip	Liberal	Death (nasopharyngeal cancer)	Yes
Lac-Saint-Jean	October 23, 2017	Denis Lebel	Conservative	Richard Hébert	Liberal	Resigned to accept a position in the private sector	No
Sturgeon River—Parkland	October 23, 2017	Rona Ambrose	Conservative	Dane Lloyd	Conservative	Resigned to accept an academic appointment	Yes
Saint-Laurent	April 3, 2017	Stéphane Dion	Liberal	Emmanuella Lambropoulos	Liberal	Resigned to accept appointment as Canadian Ambassador to Germany	Yes
Markham—Thornhill	April 3, 2017	John McCallum	Liberal	Mary Ng	Liberal	Resigned to accept appointment as Canadian Ambassador to China	Yes
Calgary Midnapore	April 3, 2017	Jason Kenney	Conservative	Stephanie Kusie	Conservative	Resigned to seek the leadership of the Progressive Conservative Association of Alberta	Yes
Calgary Heritage	April 3, 2017	Stephen Harper	Conservative	Bob Benzen	Conservative	Resigned	Yes
Ottawa—Vanier	April 3, 2017	Mauril Bélanger	Liberal	Mona Fortier	Liberal	Death (amyotrophic lateral sclerosis)	Yes
Medicine Hat— Cardston—Warner	October 24, 2016	Jim Hillyer	Conservative	Glen Motz	Conservative	Death (heart attack)	Yes

== 41st Parliament (2011–2015) ==
By-election	Date	Incumbent	Party	Winner	Party	Cause	Retained
Yellowhead	November 17, 2014	Rob Merrifield	Conservative	Jim Eglinski	Conservative	Resigned to accept appointment as Alberta's envoy to the United States.	Yes
Whitby—Oshawa	November 17, 2014	Jim Flaherty	Conservative	Pat Perkins	Conservative	Death (heart attack)	Yes
Scarborough— Agincourt	June 30, 2014	Jim Karygiannis	Liberal	Arnold Chan	Liberal	Resigned to run for Toronto City Council.	Yes
Trinity—Spadina	June 30, 2014	Olivia Chow	New Democratic	Adam Vaughan	Liberal	Resigned to run for Mayor of Toronto.	No
Fort McMurray— Athabasca	June 30, 2014	Brian Jean	Conservative	David Yurdiga	Conservative	Resigned to return to private life.	Yes
Macleod	June 30, 2014	Ted Menzies	Conservative	John Barlow	Conservative	Resigned to accept a position in the private sector.	Yes
Brandon—Souris	November 25, 2013	Merv Tweed	Conservative	Larry Maguire	Conservative	Resigned to join private sector.	Yes
Toronto Centre	November 25, 2013	Bob Rae	Liberal	Chrystia Freeland	Liberal	Resigned to become First Nations negotiator in Ontario.	Yes
Provencher	November 25, 2013	Vic Toews	Conservative	Ted Falk	Conservative	Resigned to spend more time with his family and join the private sector.	Yes
Bourassa	November 25, 2013	Denis Coderre	Liberal	Emmanuel Dubourg	Liberal	Resigned to run for Mayor of Montreal.	Yes
Labrador	May 13, 2013	Peter Penashue	Conservative	Yvonne Jones	Liberal	Resigned to run again in a by-election following election spending concerns.	No
Victoria	November 26, 2012	Denise Savoie	New Democratic	Murray Rankin	New Democratic	Resignation due to illness	Yes
Durham	November 26, 2012	Bev Oda	Conservative	Erin O'Toole	Conservative	Resignation	Yes
Calgary Centre	November 26, 2012	Lee Richardson	Conservative	Joan Crockatt	Conservative	Resigned to work in the office of the Premier of Alberta.	Yes
Toronto—Danforth	March 19, 2012	Jack Layton	New Democratic	Craig Scott	New Democratic	Death (cancer)	Yes

== 40th Parliament (2008–2011) ==
By-election	Date	Incumbent	Party	Winner	Party	Cause	Retained
Vaughan	November 29, 2010	Maurizio Bevilacqua	Liberal	Julian Fantino	Conservative	Resigned to run for Mayor of Vaughan	No
Dauphin—Swan River—Marquette	November 29, 2010	Inky Mark	Conservative	Robert Sopuck	Conservative	Resigned to run for Mayor of Dauphin	Yes
Winnipeg North	November 29, 2010	Judy Wasylycia-Leis	New Democratic	Kevin Lamoureux	Liberal	Resigned to run for Mayor of Winnipeg	No
Cumberland—Colchester—Musquodoboit Valley	November 9, 2009	Bill Casey	Independent	Scott Armstrong	Conservative	Resigned to accept appointment with Nova Scotia's Department of Intergovernmental Affairs	No
Hochelaga	November 9, 2009	Réal Ménard	Bloc Québécois	Daniel Paillé	Bloc Québécois	Resigned to run for Montreal City Council	Yes
Montmagny—L'Islet—Kamouraska—Rivière-du-Loup	November 9, 2009	Paul Crête	Bloc Québécois	Bernard Généreux	Conservative	Resigned to enter provincial politics	No
New Westminster—Coquitlam	November 9, 2009	Dawn Black	New Democratic	Fin Donnelly	New Democratic	Resigned to enter provincial politics	Yes

== 39th Parliament (2006–2008) ==
By-election	Date	Incumbent	Party	Winner	Party	Cause	Retained
Toronto Centre	March 17, 2008	Bill Graham	Liberal	Bob Rae	Liberal	Resigned	Yes
Willowdale	March 17, 2008	Jim Peterson	Liberal	Martha Hall Findlay	Liberal	Resigned	Yes
Vancouver Quadra	March 17, 2008	Stephen Owen	Liberal	Joyce Murray	Liberal	Resigned	Yes
Desnethé—Missinippi— Churchill River	March 17, 2008	Gary Merasty	Liberal	Rob Clarke	Conservative	Resigned to enter private sector	No
Outremont	September 17, 2007	Jean Lapierre	Liberal	Thomas Mulcair	New Democratic	Resigned	No
Saint-Hyacinthe—Bagot	September 17, 2007	Yvan Loubier	Bloc Québécois	Ève-Mary Thaï Thi Lac	Bloc Québécois	Resigned to enter provincial politics	Yes
Roberval—Lac-Saint-Jean	September 17, 2007	Michel Gauthier	Bloc Québécois	Denis Lebel	Conservative	Resigned	No
London North Centre	November 27, 2006	Joe Fontana	Liberal	Glen Pearson	Liberal	Resigned to run for Mayor of London	Yes
Repentigny	November 27, 2006	Benoît Sauvageau	Bloc Québécois	Raymond Gravel	Bloc Québécois	Death (car accident)	Yes

== 38th Parliament (2004–2006) ==
By-election	Date	Incumbent	Party	Winner	Party	Cause	Retained
Labrador	May 24, 2005	Lawrence D. O'Brien	Liberal	Todd Russell	Liberal	Death (cancer)	Yes

== 37th Parliament (2000–2004) ==
By-election	Date	Incumbent	Party	Winner	Party	Cause	Retained
Lévis-et-Chutes-de-la-Chaudière	June 16, 2003	Antoine Dubé	Bloc Québécois	Christian Jobin	Liberal	Resigned to enter provincial politics	No
Témiscamingue	June 16, 2003	Pierre Brien	Bloc Québécois	Gilbert Barrette	Liberal	Resigned to enter provincial politics	No
Perth—Middlesex	May 21, 2003	John Richardson	Liberal	Gary Schellenberger	Progressive Conservative	Resigned	No
Berthier—Montcalm	December 9, 2002	Michel Bellehumeur	Bloc Québécois	Roger Gaudet	Bloc Québécois	Resigned	Yes
Lac-Saint-Jean—Saguenay	December 9, 2002	Stéphan Tremblay	Bloc Québécois	Sébastien Gagnon	Bloc Québécois	Resigned to enter provincial politics	Yes
Calgary Southwest	May 13, 2002	Preston Manning	Canadian Alliance	Stephen Harper	Canadian Alliance	Resigned	Yes
Saint Boniface	May 13, 2002	Ron Duhamel	Liberal	Raymond Simard	Liberal	Appointed to the Senate	Yes
Bonavista—Trinity—Conception	May 13, 2002	Brian Tobin	Liberal	John Efford	Liberal	Resigned	Yes
Gander—Grand Falls	May 13, 2002	George Baker	Liberal	Rex Barnes	Progressive Conservative	Appointed to the Senate	No
Windsor West	May 13, 2002	Herb Gray	Liberal	Brian Masse	New Democratic	Resigned to accept appointment as Chair of the Canadian Section of the International Joint Commission	No
Saint-Léonard—Saint-Michel	May 13, 2002	Alfonso Gagliano	Liberal	Massimo Pacetti	Liberal	Resigned to accept appointment as Ambassador to Denmark	Yes
Verdun—Saint-Henri—Saint-Paul—Pointe Saint-Charles	May 13, 2002	Raymond Lavigne	Liberal	Liza Frulla	Liberal	Appointed to the Senate	Yes

== 36th Parliament (1997–2000) ==
By-election	Date	Incumbent	Party	Winner	Party	Cause	Retained
Okanagan—Coquihalla	September 11, 2000	Jim Hart	Canadian Alliance	Stockwell Day	Canadian Alliance	Resignation to provide a seat for Day	Yes
Kings—Hants	September 11, 2000	Scott Brison	Progressive Conservative	Joe Clark	Progressive Conservative	Resignation to provide a seat for Clark	Yes
St. John's West	May 15, 2000	Charlie Power	Progressive Conservative	Loyola Hearn	Progressive Conservative	Resignation	Yes
York West	November 15, 1999	Sergio Marchi	Liberal	Judy Sgro	Liberal	Resignation	Yes
Hull—Aylmer	November 15, 1999	Marcel Massé	Liberal	Marcel Proulx	Liberal	Resignation	Yes
Mount Royal	November 15, 1999	Sheila Finestone	Liberal	Irwin Cotler	Liberal	Resignation	Yes
Saskatoon—Rosetown—Biggar	November 15, 1999	Chris Axworthy	New Democratic	Dennis Gruending	New Democratic	Resignation	Yes
Windsor—St. Clair	April 12, 1999	Shaughnessy Cohen	Liberal	Rick Limoges	Liberal	Death (cerebral hemorrhage)	Yes
Sherbrooke	September 14, 1998	Jean Charest	Progressive Conservative	Serge Cardin	Bloc Québécois	Resignation to accept leadership of the Liberal Party of Quebec and enter provincial politics	No
Port Moody—Coquitlam	March 30, 1998	Sharon Hayes	Reform	Lou Sekora	Liberal	Resignation	No

== 35th Parliament (1994–1997) ==
By-election	Date	Incumbent	Party	Winner	Party	Cause	Retained
Hamilton East	June 17, 1996	Sheila Copps	Liberal	Sheila Copps	Liberal	Resignation	Yes
Humber—St. Barbe—Baie Verte	March 25, 1996	Brian Tobin	Liberal	Gerry Byrne	Liberal	Resignation	Yes
Labrador	March 25, 1996	Bill Rompkey	Liberal	Lawrence D. O'Brien	Liberal	Resignation	Yes
Etobicoke North	March 25, 1996	Roy MacLaren	Liberal	Roy Cullen	Liberal	Resignation	Yes
Lac-Saint-Jean	March 25, 1996	Lucien Bouchard	Bloc Québécois	Stéphan Tremblay	Bloc Québécois	Resignation after being elected leader of the Parti Quebecois and Premier of Quebec following the resignation of Jacques Parizeau	Yes
Papineau—Saint-Michel	March 25, 1996	André Ouellet	Liberal	Pierre Pettigrew	Liberal	Resignation	Yes
Saint-Laurent—Cartierville	March 25, 1996	Shirley Maheu	Liberal	Stéphane Dion	Liberal	Called to the Senate	Yes
Ottawa—Vanier	February 13, 1995	Jean-Robert Gauthier	Liberal	Mauril Bélanger	Liberal	Resignation	Yes
Brome—Missisquoi	February 13, 1995	Gaston Péloquin	Bloc Québécois	Denis Paradis	Liberal	Death (car accident)	No
Saint-Henri—Westmount	February 13, 1995	David Berger	Liberal	Lucienne Robillard	Liberal	Resignation	Yes

== 34th Parliament (1988–1993) ==
By-election	Date	Incumbent	Party	Winner	Party	Cause	Retained
Beauséjour	December 10, 1990	Fernand Robichaud	Liberal	Jean Chrétien	Liberal	Resignation to provide a seat for Chrétien	Yes
York North	December 10, 1990	Maurizio Bevilacqua	Liberal	Maurizio Bevilacqua	Liberal	Election declared void	Yes
Oshawa	August 13, 1990	Ed Broadbent	New Democratic	Mike Breaugh	New Democratic	Resignation	Yes
Laurier—Sainte-Marie	August 13, 1990	Jean-Claude Malépart	Liberal	Gilles Duceppe	Independent	Death	No
Chambly	February 12, 1990	Richard Grisé	Progressive Conservative	Phil Edmonston	New Democratic	Resignation	No
Beaver River	March 13, 1989	John Dahmer	Progressive Conservative	Deborah Grey	Reform	Death (cancer)	No

== 33rd Parliament (1984–1988) ==
By-election	Date	Incumbent	Party	Winner	Party	Cause	Retained
Lac-Saint-Jean	June 20, 1988	Clément Côté	Progressive Conservative	Lucien Bouchard	Progressive Conservative	Resignation	Yes
St. John's East	July 20, 1987	James A. McGrath	Progressive Conservative	Jack Harris	New Democratic	Resignation	No
Hamilton Mountain	July 20, 1987	Ian Deans	New Democratic	Marion Dewar	New Democratic	Resignation	Yes
Yukon	July 20, 1987	Erik Nielsen	Progressive Conservative	Audrey McLaughlin	New Democratic	Resignation	No
Pembina	September 29, 1986	Peter Elzinga	Progressive Conservative	Walter van de Walle	Progressive Conservative	Resignation	Yes
Saint-Maurice	September 29, 1986	Jean Chrétien	Liberal	Gilles Grondin	Liberal	Resignation	Yes

== 32nd Parliament (1980–1984) ==
By-election	Date	Incumbent	Party	Winner	Party	Cause	Retained
Mission—Port Moody	August 29, 1983	Mark Rose	New Democratic	Gerry St. Germain	Progressive Conservative	Resignation	No
Central Nova	August 29, 1983	Elmer M. MacKay	Progressive Conservative	Brian Mulroney	Progressive Conservative	Resignation to provide a seat for Mulroney	Yes
Brandon—Souris	May 24, 1983	Walter Dinsdale	Progressive Conservative	Lee Clark	Progressive Conservative	Death (kidney failure)	Yes
Broadview—Greenwood	October 12, 1982	Bob Rae	New Democratic	Lynn McDonald	New Democratic	Resigned to become leader of New Democratic Party of Ontario	Yes
Leeds—Grenville	October 12, 1982	Tom Cossitt	Progressive Conservative	Jennifer Cossitt	Progressive Conservative	Death (heart attack)	Yes
Timiskaming	October 12, 1982	Bruce Lonsdale	Liberal	John A. MacDougall	Progressive Conservative	Death (car accident)	No
Spadina	August 17, 1981	Peter Stollery	Liberal	Dan Heap	New Democratic	Called to the Senate	No
Joliette	August 17, 1981	Roch La Salle	Progressive Conservative	Roch La Salle	Progressive Conservative	Resignation to contest the 1981 Quebec election	Yes
Lévis	May 4, 1981	Raynald Guay	Liberal	Gaston Gourde	Liberal	Resignation	Yes
London West	April 13, 1981	Judd Buchanan	Liberal	Jack Burghardt	Liberal	Resignation	Yes
Cardigan	April 13, 1981	Daniel J. MacDonald	Liberal	W. Bennett Campbell	Liberal	Death	Yes
Hamilton West	September 8, 1980	Lincoln Alexander	Progressive Conservative	Stan Hudecki	Liberal	Resignation	No

== 31st Parliament (1979) ==
By-election	Date	Incumbent	Party	Winner	Party	Cause	Retained
Prince Albert	November 19, 1979	John Diefenbaker	Progressive Conservative	Stan Hovdebo	New Democratic	Death (heart attack)	No
Burin—St. George's	September 19, 1979	Don Jamieson	Liberal	Roger Simmons	Liberal	Resignation	Yes

== 30th Parliament (1974–1979) ==
By-election	Date	Incumbent	Party	Winner	Party	Cause	Retained
Burnaby—Richmond—Delta	October 16, 1978	John Reynolds	Progressive Conservative	Tom Siddon	Progressive Conservative	Resignation	Yes
St. Boniface	October 16, 1978	Joseph-Philippe Guay	Liberal	Jack Hare	Progressive Conservative	Resignation	No
Fundy—Royal	October 16, 1978	Gordon Fairweather	Progressive Conservative	Robert Corbett	Progressive Conservative	Resignation	Yes
Humber—St. George's—St. Barbe	October 16, 1978	Jack Marshall	Progressive Conservative	Fonse Faour	New Democratic	Resignation	No
Halifax—East Hants	October 16, 1978	Bob McCleave	Progressive Conservative	Howard Edward Crosby	Progressive Conservative	Resignation	Yes
Broadview	October 16, 1978	John Gilbert	New Democratic	Bob Rae	New Democratic	Resignation	Yes
Eglinton	October 16, 1978	Mitchell Sharp	Liberal	Rob Parker	Progressive Conservative	Resignation	No
Hamilton—Wentworth	October 16, 1978	Sean O'Sullivan	Progressive Conservative	Geoff Scott	Progressive Conservative	Resignation	Yes
Ottawa Centre	October 16, 1978	Hugh Poulin	Liberal	Robert de Cotret	Progressive Conservative	Resignation	No
Parkdale	October 16, 1978	Stan Haidasz	Liberal	Yuri Shymko	Progressive Conservative	Resignation	No
Rosedale	October 16, 1978	Donald S. Macdonald	Liberal	David Crombie	Progressive Conservative	Resignation	No
York—Scarborough	October 16, 1978	Robert Stanbury	Liberal	W. Paul McCrossan	Progressive Conservative	Resignation	No
Lotbinière	October 16, 1978	André Fortin	Social Credit	Richard Janelle	Social Credit	Death	Yes
Saint-Hyacinthe	October 16, 1978	Claude Wagner	Progressive Conservative	Marcel Ostiguy	Liberal	Resignation	No
Westmount	October 16, 1978	Bud Drury	Liberal	Don Johnston	Liberal	Resignation	Yes
Malpeque	May 24, 1977	J. Angus MacLean	Progressive Conservative	Donald Wood	Liberal	Resignation	No
Langelier	May 24, 1977	Jean Marchand	Liberal	Gilles Lamontagne	Liberal	Resignation	Yes
Louis-Hébert	May 24, 1977	Albanie Morin	Liberal	Dennis Dawson	Liberal	Death	Yes
Témiscamingue	May 24, 1977	Réal Caouette	Social Credit	Gilles Caouette	Social Credit	Death	Yes
Terrebonne	May 24, 1977	Joseph-Roland Comtois	Liberal	Joseph-Roland Comtois	Liberal	Resignation	Yes
Verdun	May 24, 1977	Bryce Mackasey	Liberal	Raymond Savard	Liberal	Resignation	Yes
St. John's West	October 18, 1976	Walter Carter	Progressive Conservative	John C. Crosbie	Progressive Conservative	Resignation	Yes
Ottawa—Carleton	October 18, 1976	John Turner	Liberal	Jean Pigott	Progressive Conservative	Resignation	No
Restigouche	October 14, 1975	Jean-Eudes Dubé	Liberal	Maurice Harquail	Liberal	Resignation	Yes
Hochelaga	October 14, 1975	Gérard Pelletier	Liberal	Jacques Lavoie	Progressive Conservative	Resignation	No

== 29th Parliament (1973–1974) ==
no by-elections

== 28th Parliament (1968–1972) ==
By-election	Date	Incumbent	Party	Winner	Party	Cause	Retained
Assiniboia	November 8, 1971	Albert B. Douglas	Liberal	Bill Knight	New Democratic	Death	No
Central Nova	May 31, 1971	Russell MacEwan	Progressive Conservative	Elmer M. MacKay	Progressive Conservative	Resignation	Yes
Brant	May 31, 1971	James Elisha Brown	Liberal	Derek Blackburn	New Democratic	Appointed a judge	No
Chambly	May 31, 1971	Bernard Pilon	Liberal	Yvon L'Heureux	Liberal	Death	Yes
Trois-Rivières	May 31, 1971	Joseph-Alfred Mongrain	Liberal	Claude Lajoie	Liberal	Death	Yes
Lisgar	November 6, 1970	George Muir	Progressive Conservative	Jack Murta	Progressive Conservative	Death	Yes
Frontenac	November 6, 1970	Bernard Dumont	Ralliement Créditiste	Léopold Corriveau	Liberal	Resignation	No
Labelle	November 6, 1970	Léo Cadieux	Liberal	Maurice Dupras	Liberal	Appointed Ambassador to France	Yes
Selkirk	April 13, 1970	Edward Schreyer	New Democratic	Doug Rowland	New Democratic	Resignation	Yes
Comox—Alberni	April 8, 1969	Richard J. J. Durante	Liberal	Thomas Speakman Barnett	New Democratic	Election declared void	No
Nanaimo—Cowichan—The Islands	February 10, 1969	Colin Cameron	New Democratic	Tommy C. Douglas	New Democratic	Death	Yes

== 27th Parliament (1965–1968) ==
By-election	Date	Incumbent	Party	Winner	Party	Cause	Retained
Jasper—Edson	November 6, 1967	Hugh Horner	Progressive Conservative	Douglas Caston	Progressive Conservative	Resignation	Yes
Bonavista—Twillingate	November 6, 1967	Jack Pickersgill	Liberal	Charles Ronald Granger	Liberal	Resignation	Yes
Colchester—Hants	November 6, 1967	Cyril Kennedy	Progressive Conservative	Robert L. Stanfield	Progressive Conservative	Resignation to provide a seat for Stanfield	Yes
Sudbury	May 29, 1967	Rodger Mitchell	Liberal	Bud Germa	New Democratic	Death	No
Hull	May 29, 1967	Alexis Caron	Liberal	Pierre Caron	Liberal	Death	Yes
Outremont—St-Jean	May 29, 1967	Maurice Lamontagne	Liberal	Aurélien Noël	Liberal	Resignation	Yes
Papineau	May 29, 1967	Guy Favreau	Liberal	André Ouellet	Liberal	Appointed as a Justice of the Quebec Superior Court	Yes
Richelieu—Verchères	May 29, 1967	Lucien Cardin	Liberal	Jacques-R. Tremblay	Liberal	Resignation	Yes
Burin—Burgeo	September 19, 1966	Chesley W. Carter	Liberal	Don Jamieson	Liberal	Called to the Senate	Yes
Grand Falls—White Bay—Labrador	September 19, 1966	Charles Ronald Granger	Liberal	Andrew Chatwood	Liberal	Resignation	Yes
Nicolet—Yamaska	September 19, 1966	Clément Vincent	Progressive Conservative	Florian Coté	Liberal	Resignation	No

== 26th Parliament (1963–1965) ==
By-election	Date	Incumbent	Party	Winner	Party	Cause	Retained
Westmorland	November 9, 1964	Sherwood Rideout	Liberal	Margaret Rideout	Liberal	Death	Yes
Waterloo South	November 9, 1964	Gordon Chaplin	Progressive Conservative	Max Saltsman	New Democratic	Death	No
Nipissing	June 22, 1964	Jack Garland	Liberal	Carl Legault	Liberal	Death	Yes
Saskatoon	June 22, 1964	Henry Frank Jones	Progressive Conservative	Eloise Jones	Progressive Conservative	Death	Yes
Laurier	February 10, 1964	Lionel Chevrier	Liberal	Fernand-E. Leblanc	Liberal	Resignation	Yes
Saint-Denis	February 10, 1964	Azellus Denis	Liberal	Marcel Prud'Homme	Liberal	Resignation	Yes

== 25th Parliament (1962–1963) ==
By-election	Date	Incumbent	Party	Winner	Party	Cause	Retained
Burnaby—Coquitlam	October 22, 1962	Erhart Regier	New Democratic	Tommy Douglas	New Democratic	Resignation to provide a seat for Douglas	Yes

== 24th Parliament (1958–1962) ==
By-election	Date	Incumbent	Party	Winner	Party	Cause	Retained
Esquimalt—Saanich	May 29, 1961	George Pearkes	Progressive Conservative	George Chatterton	Progressive Conservative	Appointed Lieutenant Governor of British Columbia	Yes
Restigouche—Madawaska	May 29, 1961	Joseph Charles Van Horne	Progressive Conservative	Edgar-E. Fournier	Progressive Conservative	Resignation	Yes
Leeds	May 29, 1961	Hayden Stanton	Progressive Conservative	John Ross Matheson	Liberal	Death	No
King's	May 29, 1961	John Augustine Macdonald	Progressive Conservative	Margaret Mary Macdonald	Progressive Conservative	Death	Yes
Royal	October 31, 1960	Alfred J. Brooks	Progressive Conservative	Hugh John Flemming	Progressive Conservative	Called to the Senate	Yes
Niagara Falls	October 31, 1960	William Houck	Liberal	Judy LaMarsh	Liberal	Death	Yes
Peterborough	October 31, 1960	Gordon K. Fraser	Progressive Conservative	Walter Pitman	New	Death	No
Labelle	October 31, 1960	Henri Courtemanche	Progressive Conservative	Gaston Clermont	Liberal	Called to the Senate	No
Hastings—Frontenac	October 5, 1959	Sidney Earle Smith	Progressive Conservative	Rod Webb	Progressive Conservative	Death	Yes
Russell	October 5, 1959	Joseph-Omer Gour	Liberal	Paul Tardif	Liberal	Death	Yes
Springfield	December 15, 1958	Val Yacula	Progressive Conservative	Joe Slogan	Progressive Conservative	Death	Yes
Trinity	December 15, 1958	Edward R. Lockyer	Progressive Conservative	Paul Hellyer	Liberal	Death	No
Grenville—Dundas	September 29, 1958	A. Clair Casselman	Progressive Conservative	Jean Casselman	Progressive Conservative	Death	Yes
Montmagny—L'Islet	September 29, 1958	Jean Lesage	Liberal	Louis Fortin	Progressive Conservative	Resigned to enter provincial politics in Quebec	No

== 23rd Parliament (1957–1958) ==
By-election	Date	Incumbent	Party	Winner	Party	Cause	Retained
Yukon	December 16, 1957	James Aubrey Simmons	Liberal	Erik Nielsen	Progressive Conservative	Election declared void	No
Hastings—Frontenac	November 4, 1957	George Stanley White	Progressive Conservative	Sidney Earle Smith	Progressive Conservative	Called to the Senate	Yes
Lanark	August 26, 1957	William G. Blair	Progressive Conservative	George Doucett	Progressive Conservative	Death	Yes

== 22nd Parliament (1953–1957) ==
By-election	Date	Incumbent	Party	Winner	Party	Cause	Retained
Saint-Jean—Iberville—Napierville	December 19, 1955	Alcide Côté	Liberal	J.-Armand Ménard	Liberal	Death	Yes
Spadina	October 24, 1955	David A. Croll	Liberal	Charles E. Rea	Progressive Conservative	Called to the Senate	No
Restigouche—Madawaska	September 26, 1955	Joseph Gaspard Boucher	Liberal	Joseph Charles Van Horne	Progressive Conservative	Death	No
Bellechasse	September 26, 1955	L.-Philippe Picard	Liberal	Ovide Laflamme	Liberal	Resignation	Yes
Quebec South	September 26, 1955	Charles G. Power	Liberal	Frank G. Power	Liberal	Called to the Senate	Yes
Témiscouata	September 26, 1955	Jean-François Pouliot	Liberal	Jean-Paul St-Laurent	Liberal	Called to the Senate	Yes
Battle River—Camrose	June 20, 1955	Robert Fair	Social Credit	James A. Smith	Social Credit	Death	Yes
Selkirk	November 8, 1954	Robert James Wood	Liberal	Scottie Bryce	C. C. F.	Death	No
Stormont	November 8, 1954	Lionel Chevrier	Liberal	Albert Peter Lavigne	Liberal	Appointed President of the St. Lawrence Seaway Authority	Yes
Trinity	November 8, 1954	Lionel Conacher	Liberal	Donald D. Carrick	Liberal	Death	Yes
York West	November 8, 1954	Agar Rodney Adamson	Progressive Conservative	John B. Hamilton	Progressive Conservative	Death	Yes
Saint-Antoine—Westmount	November 8, 1954	Douglas Charles Abbott	Liberal	George C. Marler	Liberal	Appointed a Justice of the Supreme Court of Canada	Yes
St. Lawrence—St. George	November 8, 1954	Brooke Claxton	Liberal	Claude Richardson	Liberal	Resignation	Yes
Elgin	March 22, 1954	Charles Delmer Coyle	Progressive Conservative	James A. McBain	Progressive Conservative	Death	Yes
Peel	March 22, 1954	Gordon Graydon	Progressive Conservative	John Pallett	Progressive Conservative	Death	Yes
Gatineau	March 22, 1954	Joseph-Célestin Nadon	Liberal	Rodolphe Leduc	Liberal	Death	Yes
Verdun	March 22, 1954	Paul-Émile Côté	Liberal	Yves Leduc	Liberal	Appointed a Superior Court Judge of Quebec	Yes

== 21st Parliament (1949–1953) ==
By-election	Date	Incumbent	Party	Winner	Party	Cause	Retained
Outremont—St-Jean	October 6, 1952	Édouard-G. Rinfret	Liberal	Romuald Bourque	Liberal	Appointed a Judge of the Court of Queen's Bench of Quebec	Yes
Richelieu—Verchères	October 6, 1952	Gérard Cournoyer	Liberal	Lucien Cardin	Liberal	Resignation	Yes
Ontario	May 26, 1952	Walter Cunningham Thomson	Liberal	Michael Starr	Progressive Conservative	Resignation	No
Gloucester	May 26, 1952	Clovis-Thomas Richard	Liberal	Albany M. Robichaud	Progressive Conservative	Resignation	No
Victoria—Carleton	May 26, 1952	Heber Harold Hatfield	Progressive Conservative	Gage W. Montgomery	Progressive Conservative	Death	Yes
Brome—Missisquoi	May 26, 1952	Henri A. Gosselin	Liberal	Joseph-Léon Deslières	Liberal	Death	Yes
Roberval	May 26, 1952	Joseph-Alfred Dion	Liberal	Paul-Henri Spence	Progressive Conservative	Appointed a Superior Court Judge of Quebec	No
Waterloo North	May 26, 1952	Louis Orville Breithaupt	Liberal	Norman C. Schneider	Liberal	Appointed Lieutenant Governor of Ontario	Yes
Calgary West	December 10, 1951	Arthur LeRoy Smith	Progressive Conservative	Carl Olof Nickle	Progressive Conservative	Resignation	Yes
Brandon	June 25, 1951	James Ewen Matthews	Liberal	Walter Dinsdale	Progressive Conservative	Death	No
Queen's	June 25, 1951	J. Lester Douglas	Liberal	J. Angus MacLean	Progressive Conservative	Death	No
Waterloo South	June 25, 1951	Karl Homuth	Progressive Conservative	Howie Meeker	Progressive Conservative	Death	Yes
Winnipeg South Centre	June 25, 1951	Ralph Maybank	Liberal	Gordon Churchill	Progressive Conservative	Resignation	No
Rimouski	October 16, 1950	Gleason Belzile	Liberal	Joseph-Hervé Rousseau	Independent Liberal	Death	No
St. Mary	October 16, 1950	Gaspard Fauteux	Liberal	Hector Dupuis	Liberal	Resignation	Yes
Welland	October 16, 1950	Humphrey Mitchell	Liberal	William H. McMillan	Liberal	Death	Yes
Joliette—L'Assomption—Montcalm	October 3, 1950	Georges-Émile Lapalme	Liberal	Maurice Breton	Liberal	Resignation	Yes
Annapolis—Kings	June 19, 1950	Angus Alexander Elderkin	Liberal	George Clyde Nowlan	Progressive Conservative	Election declared void	No
Cartier	June 19, 1950	Maurice Hartt	Liberal	Leon Crestohl	Liberal	Death	Yes
Halifax	June 19, 1950	Gordon B. Isnor	Liberal	Sam Balcom	Liberal	Called to the Senate	Yes
Broadview	May 15, 1950	Thomas Langton Church	Progressive Conservative	George Hees	Progressive Conservative	Death	Yes
Hamilton West	May 15, 1950	Colin W. G. Gibson	Liberal	Ellen Fairclough	Progressive Conservative	Appointed a Judge of the Supreme Court of Ontario	No
Gatineau	October 24, 1949	Léon-Joseph Raymond	Liberal	Joseph-Célestin Nadon	Liberal	Appointed Clerk of the House of Commons	Yes
Kamouraska	October 24, 1949	Eugène Marquis	Liberal	Arthur Massé (Note: Massé defeated the official Liberal candidate.)	Independent Liberal	Appointed a Superior Court Judge of Quebec	No
Laurier	October 24, 1949	Ernest Bertrand	Liberal	J.-Eugène Lefrancois	Liberal	Appointed a Judge of the Court of King's Bench of Quebec	Yes
Mercier	October 24, 1949	Joseph Jean	Liberal	Marcel Monette	Liberal	Appointed a Judge of the Supreme Court of the District of Montreal	Yes
Greenwood	October 24, 1949	J. Ernest McMillin	Progressive Conservative	James Macdonnell	Progressive Conservative	Death	Yes
New Westminster	October 24, 1949	Tom Reid	Liberal	William Malcolm Mott	Liberal	Called to the Senate	Yes
Restigouche—Madawaska	October 24, 1949	Benoît Michaud	Liberal	Paul-Léon Dubé	Independent Liberal	Death	No
Jacques Cartier	October 4, 1949	Elphège Marier	Liberal	Edgar Leduc	Independent	Appointed a Superior Court Judge of Quebec	No

== 20th Parliament (1945–1949) ==
By-election	Date	Incumbent	Party	Winner	Party	Cause	Retained
Nicolet—Yamaska	February 7, 1949	Lucien Dubois	Independent Liberal	Renaud Chapdelaine	Progressive Conservative	Death	No
Carleton	December 20, 1948	George Russell Boucher	Progressive Conservative	George A. Drew	Progressive Conservative	Resignation to provide a seat for Drew	Yes
Laval—Two Mountains	December 20, 1948	Liguori Lacombe	Independent	Léopold Demers	Liberal	Resignation	No
Marquette	December 20, 1948	James Allison Glen	Liberal	Stuart Sinclair Garson	Liberal	Resignation	Yes
Digby—Annapolis—Kings	December 13, 1948	James Lorimer Ilsley	Liberal	George Clyde Nowlan	Progressive Conservative	Resignation	No
Algoma East	October 25, 1948	Thomas Farquhar	Liberal	Lester B. Pearson	Liberal	Called to the Senate	Yes
Rosthern	October 25, 1948	Walter Adam Tucker	Liberal	William Albert Boucher	Liberal	Resignation	Yes
Ontario	June 8, 1948	W. E. N. Sinclair	Liberal	Arthur Henry Williams	CCF	Death	No
Vancouver Centre	June 8, 1948	Ian Alistair Mackenzie	Liberal	Rodney Young	CCF	Called to the Senate	No
Yale	May 31, 1948	Grote Stirling	Progressive Conservative	Owen Lewis Jones	CCF	Resignation	No
York—Sunbury	October 20, 1947	H. Francis G. Bridges	Liberal	Milton Gregg	Liberal	Death	Yes
Halifax	July 14, 1947	William Chisholm Macdonald	Liberal	John Dickey	Liberal	Death	Yes
Cartier	March 31, 1947	Fred Rose	Labor-Progressive	Maurice Hartt	Liberal	Seat declared vacant by resolution of the House of Commons	No
Richelieu—Verchères	December 23, 1946	Arthur Cardin	Independent	Gérard Cournoyer	Liberal	Death	No
Parkdale	October 21, 1946	Herbert A. Bruce	Progressive Conservative	Harold Timmins	Progressive Conservative	Resignation	Yes
Portage la Prairie	October 21, 1946	Harry Leader	Liberal	Calvert Charlton Miller	Progressive Conservative	Death	No
Pontiac	September 16, 1946	Wallace McDonald	Liberal	Réal Caouette	Social Credit	Death	No
Glengarry	August 6, 1945	William B. MacDiarmid	Liberal	William Lyon Mackenzie King	Liberal	Resignation to provide a seat for Mackenzie King	Yes

== 19th Parliament (1940–1945) ==
By-election	Date	Incumbent	Party	Winner	Party	Cause	Retained
Grey North	February 5, 1945	William Pattison Telford, Jr.	Liberal	W. Garfield Case	Progressive Conservative	Resignation to provide a seat for Andrew McNaughton	No
Cartier	August 9, 1943	Peter Bercovitch	Liberal	Fred Rose	Labor-Progressive	Death	No
Stanstead	August 9, 1943	Robert Davison	Liberal	Joseph-Armand Choquette	Bloc populaire Canadien	Election declared void	No
Humboldt	August 9, 1943	Harry Raymond Fleming	Liberal	Joseph William Burton	C. C. F.	Death	No
Selkirk	August 9, 1943	Joseph Thorarinn Thorson	Liberal	William Bryce	C. C. F.	Appointed President of the Exchequer Court of Canada	No
Charlevoix—Saguenay	November 30, 1942	Pierre-François Casgrain	Liberal	Frédéric Dorion	Independent	Appointed a Superior Court Judge of Quebec	No
Winnipeg North Centre	November 30, 1942	J. S. Woodsworth	C. C. F.	Stanley Knowles	C. C. F.	Death	Yes
Outremont	November 30, 1942	Thomas Vien	Liberal	Léo Richer Laflèche	Liberal	Called to the Senate	Yes
St. Mary	February 9, 1942	Hermas Deslauriers	Liberal	Gaspard Fauteux	Liberal	Death	Yes
Welland	February 9, 1942	Arthur Damude	Liberal	Humphrey Mitchell	Liberal	Death	Yes
York South	February 9, 1942	Alan Cockeram	National Government	Joseph W. Noseworthy	C. C. F.	Resignation to provide a seat for Arthur Meighen	No
Quebec East	February 9, 1942	Ernest Lapointe	Liberal	Louis St. Laurent	Liberal	Death	Yes
Edmonton East	June 2, 1941	Frederick Clayton Casselman	Liberal	Cora Taylor Casselman	Liberal	Death	Yes
Saskatoon City	August 19, 1940	Walter George Brown	United Reform Movement	Alfred Henry Bence	Conservative	Death	No
Carleton	August 19, 1940	Alonzo Hyndman	National Government	George Russell Boucher	Conservative	Death	Yes
Waterloo North	August 19, 1940	William Daum Euler	Liberal	Louis Orville Breithaupt	Liberal	Called to the Senate	Yes
Kingston City	August 12, 1940	Norman McLeod Rogers	Liberal	Angus Lewis Macdonald	Liberal	Death	Yes

== 18th Parliament (1936–1940) ==
By-election	Date	Incumbent	Party	Winner	Party	Cause	Retained
Prince	January 2, 1940	Alfred Edgar MacLean	Liberal	James Layton Ralston	Liberal	Death	Yes
Saskatoon City	December 18, 1939	Alexander MacGillivray Young	Liberal	Walter George Brown	United Reform Movement	Death	No
St. James	December 18, 1939	Fernand Rinfret	Liberal	Eugène Durocher	Liberal	Death	Yes
Jacques Cartier	December 18, 1939	Vital Mallette	Liberal	Elphège Marier	Liberal	Death	Yes
Kent	December 11, 1939	James Rutherford	Liberal	Arthur Lisle Thompson	Liberal	Death	Yes
Calgary West	September 18, 1939	R. B. Bennett	Conservative	Douglas Cunnington	Conservative	Resignation	Yes
Brandon	November 14, 1938	David Wilson Beaubier	Conservative	James Ewen Matthews	Liberal	Death	No
London	November 14, 1938	Frederick Cronyn Betts	Conservative	Robert James Manion	Conservative	Death	Yes
Waterloo South	November 14, 1938	Alexander Edwards	Conservative	Karl Homuth	Conservative	Death	Yes
Cartier	November 7, 1938	Samuel William Jacobs	Liberal	Peter Bercovitch	Liberal	Death	Yes
Edmonton East	March 21, 1938	William Samuel Hall	Social Credit	Orvis A. Kennedy	Social Credit	Death	Yes
Argenteuil	February 28, 1938	George H. Perley	Conservative	Georges Héon	Independent Conservative	Death	No
St. John—Albert	February 21, 1938	William Ryan	Liberal	Allan McAvity	Liberal	Death	Yes
St. Henry	January 17, 1938	Paul Mercier	Liberal	Joseph Arsène Bonnier	Liberal	Appointed a Circuit Court Judge of Montreal	Yes
Lotbinière	December 27, 1937	Joseph-Achille Verville	Liberal	Joseph-Napoléon Francoeur	Liberal	Death	Yes
Victoria	November 29, 1937	Simon Fraser Tolmie	Conservative	Robert Mayhew	Liberal	Death	No
Dufferin—Simcoe	November 8, 1937	William Earl Rowe	Conservative	William Earl Rowe	Conservative	Resignation	Yes
Frontenac—Addington	November 1, 1937	Colin Campbell	Liberal	Angus Neil McCallum	Liberal	Resignation	Yes
Cape Breton North and Victoria	October 18, 1937	Daniel Alexander Cameron	Liberal	Matthew Maclean	Liberal	Death	Yes
Renfrew North	April 5, 1937	Matthew McKay	Liberal	Ralph Warren	Liberal	Death	Yes
Hamilton West	March 22, 1937	Herbert Earl Wilton	Conservative	John Allmond Marsh	Conservative	Death	Yes
Bonaventure	March 22, 1937	Charles Marcil	Liberal	Pierre-Emile Cote	Liberal	Death	Yes
Ottawa East	October 26, 1936	Edgar-Rodolphe-Eugène Chevrier	Liberal	Joseph Albert Pinard	Liberal	Appointed a judge of the High Court of Justice of Ontario	Yes
Gloucester	August 17, 1936	Peter Veniot	Liberal	Clarence Joseph Veniot	Liberal	Death	Yes
Wright	August 3, 1936	Fizalam-William Perras	Liberal	Rodolphe Leduc	Liberal	Death	Yes
Victoria	June 8, 1936	D'Arcy Plunkett	Conservative	Simon Tolmie	Conservative	Death	Yes
Antigonish—Guysborough	March 16, 1936	William Duff	Liberal	J. Ralph Kirk	Liberal	Called to the Senate	Yes
Portneuf	January 27, 1936	Lucien Cannon	Liberal	Pierre Gauthier	Liberal	Appointed a Superior Court Judge of Quebec	Yes
Assiniboia	January 6, 1936	Robert McKenzie	Liberal	James Garfield Gardiner	Liberal	Resignation to provide a seat for Gardiner	Yes
Queen's	December 30, 1935	J. James Larabee	Liberal	Charles Avery Dunning	Liberal	Appointed a Fisheries Protection Officer	Yes

== 17th Parliament (1930–1935) ==
By-election	Date	Incumbent	Party	Winner	Party	Cause	Retained
Frontenac—Addington	September 24, 1934	William Spankie	Conservative	Colin Campbell	Liberal	Death	No
Toronto East	September 24, 1934	Edmond Baird Ryckman	Conservative	Thomas Langton Church	Conservative	Death	Yes
Kenora—Rainy River	September 24, 1934	Peter Heenan	Liberal	Hugh McKinnon	Liberal	Resignation	Yes
Elgin West	September 24, 1934	Mitchell Hepburn	Liberal	Wilson Mills	Liberal	Resignation	Yes
York North	September 24, 1934	Thomas Herbert Lennox	Conservative	William Pate Mulock	Liberal	Death	No
Oxford South	April 16, 1934	Thomas Merritt Cayley	Liberal	Almon Rennie	Liberal	Death	Yes
Yamaska	October 23, 1933	Aimé Boucher	Liberal	Aimé Boucher	Liberal	Election declared void	Yes
Mackenzie	October 23, 1933	Milton Neil Campbell	Progressive	John Angus MacMillan	Liberal	Appointed vice-president of the Tariff Board	No
Restigouche—Madawaska	October 23, 1933	Maxime Cormier	Conservative	Joseph Michaud	Liberal	Death	No
Huron South	October 3, 1932	Thomas McMillan	Liberal	William Henry Golding	Liberal	Death	Yes
Maisonneuve	June 27, 1932	Clément Robitaille	Liberal	Joseph Jean	Liberal	Death	Yes
Royal	June 27, 1932	George Burpee Jones	Conservative	George Burpee Jones	Conservative	Resignation	Yes
Athabaska	March 21, 1932	John Francis Buckley	Liberal	Percy Griffith Davies	Conservative	Death	No
Three Rivers—St. Maurice	August 10, 1931	Arthur Bettez	Liberal	Charles Bourgeois	Conservative	Death	No
Hamilton East	August 10, 1931	George Septimus Rennie	Conservative	Humphrey Mitchell	Labour	Death	No
Richmond—West Cape Breton	September 2, 1930	John Alexander Macdonald	Conservative	Edgar Nelson Rhodes	Conservative	Resignation to provide a seat for Rhodes	Yes
Melfort	August 25, 1930	Robert Weir	Conservative	Robert Weir	Conservative	Recontested upon appointment as Minister of Agriculture.	Yes
Oxford North	August 25, 1930	Donald Matheson Sutherland	Conservative	Donald Matheson Sutherland	Conservative	Recontested upon appointment as Minister of National Defence.	Yes
Leeds	August 25, 1930	Hugh Alexander Stewart	Conservative	Hugh Alexander Stewart	Conservative	Recontested upon appointment as Minister of Public Works.	Yes
Kootenay East	August 25, 1930	Michael Dalton McLean	Conservative	Henry Herbert Stevens	Conservative	Resignation to provide a seat for Stevens	Yes
Laval—Two Mountains	August 25, 1930	Arthur Sauvé	Conservative	Arthur Sauvé	Conservative	Recontested upon appointment as Postmaster General.	Yes
Toronto East	August 25, 1930	Edmond Baird Ryckman	Conservative	Edmond Baird Ryckman	Conservative	Recontested upon appointment as Minister of National Revenue.	Yes
Neepawa	August 25, 1930	Thomas Gerow Murphy	Conservative	Thomas Gerow Murphy	Conservative	Recontested upon appointment as Minister of the Interior.	Yes
Fort William	August 25, 1930	Robert James Manion	Conservative	Robert James Manion	Conservative	Recontested upon appointment as Minister of Railways and Canals.	Yes
St. John—Albert	August 25, 1930	Murray MacLaren	Conservative	Murray MacLaren	Conservative	Recontested upon appointment as Minister of Pensions and National Health.	Yes
Wellington South	August 25, 1930	Hugh Guthrie	Conservative	Hugh Guthrie	Conservative	Recontested upon appointment as Minister of Justice.	Yes
Timiskaming South	August 25, 1930	Wesley Gordon	Conservative	Wesley Gordon	Conservative	Recontested upon appointment as Minister of Immigration and Colonization and Minister of Mines.	Yes
Chambly—Verchères	August 25, 1930	Alfred Duranleau	Conservative	Alfred Duranleau	Conservative	Recontested upon appointment as Minister of Marine.	Yes
Quebec West	August 25, 1930	Maurice Dupré	Conservative	Maurice Dupré	Conservative	Recontested upon appointment as Solicitor General.	Yes
St. Lawrence—St. George	August 25, 1930	Charles Cahan	Conservative	Charles Cahan	Conservative	Recontested upon appointment as Secretary of State of Canada.	Yes
Calgary West	August 25, 1930	R. B. Bennett	Conservative	R. B. Bennett	Conservative	Recontested upon appointment as Prime Minister and Minister of Finance.	Yes

== 16th Parliament (1926–1930) ==
By-election	Date	Incumbent	Party	Winner	Party	Cause	Retained
Brandon	February 5, 1930	Robert Forke	Liberal-Progressive	Thomas Alexander Crerar	Liberal	Called to the Senate	No
Bagot	January 27, 1930	Georges Dorèze Morin	Liberal	Cyrille Dumaine	Liberal	Death	Yes
Châteauguay—Huntingdon	January 27, 1930	James Alexander Robb	Liberal	Dennis James O'Connor	Liberal	Death	Yes
Prescott	July 29, 1929	Louis-Mathias Auger	Independent Liberal	Élie-Oscar Bertrand	Liberal	Resignation following criminal charge	No
Lanark	July 29, 1929	Richard Franklin Preston	Conservative	William Samuel Murphy	Independent Conservative	Death	No
Vaudreuil-Soulanges	July 29, 1929	Lawrence Alexander Wilson	Liberal	Lawrence Alexander Wilson	Liberal	Resigned, intending to retire, but persuaded to run again	Yes
Laprairie—Napierville	July 22, 1929	Roch Lanctôt	Liberal	Vincent Dupuis	Liberal	Death	Yes
Frontenac—Addington	July 22, 1929	John Wesley Edwards	Conservative	William Spankie	Conservative	Death	Yes
Lambton West	January 14, 1929	William Goodison	Liberal	Ross Gray	Liberal	Death	Yes
Joliette	December 17, 1928	Jean-Joseph Denis	Liberal	Charles-Édouard Ferland	Liberal	Appointed a judge of the Superior Court of Quebec.	Yes
Victoria	December 6, 1928	Simon Fraser Tolmie	Conservative	D'Arcy Plunkett	Conservative	Resignation to become Premier of British Columbia.	Yes
York West	October 29, 1928	Henry Lumley Drayton	Conservative	Earl Lawson	Conservative	Appointed Chairman of the Liquor Control Board of Ontario.	Yes
Maple Creek	November 25, 1927	George Spence	Liberal	William George Bock	Liberal	Resignation to enter provincial politics in Saskatchewan	Yes
Huron North	September 12, 1927	John Warwick King	Progressive	George Spotton	Liberal	Death	No
Victoria—Carleton	June 16, 1927	James Kidd Flemming	Conservative	Albion Roudolph Foster	Liberal	Death	No
Antigonish—Guysborough	January 18, 1927	John Carey Douglas	Conservative	William Duff	Liberal	Death	No
Kootenay East	November 9, 1926	James Horace King	Liberal	James Horace King	Liberal	Recontested upon appointment as Minister of Soldiers' Civil Re-establishment	Yes
Bruce North	November 9, 1926	James Malcolm	Liberal	James Malcolm	Liberal	Recontested upon appointment as Minister of Trade and Commerce	Yes
Dorchester	November 2, 1926	Lucien Cannon	Liberal	Lucien Cannon	Liberal	Recontested upon appointment as Solicitor General	Yes
Richelieu	November 2, 1926	Arthur Cardin	Liberal	Arthur Cardin	Liberal	Recontested upon appointment as Minister of Marine and Fisheries	Yes
Regina	November 2, 1926	Charles Avery Dunning	Liberal	Charles Avery Dunning	Liberal	Recontested upon appointment as Minister of Railways and Canals.	Yes
Middlesex West	November 2, 1926	John Campbell Elliott	Liberal	John Campbell Elliott	Liberal	Recontested upon appointment as Minister of Public Works.	Yes
Waterloo North	November 2, 1926	William Daum Euler	Liberal	William Daum Euler	Liberal	Recontested upon appointment as Minister of Customs and Excise.	Yes
Brandon	November 2, 1926	Robert Forke	Liberal-Progressive	Robert Forke	Liberal-Progressive	Recontested upon appointment as Minister of Immigration and Colonization	Yes
Kenora—Rainy River	November 2, 1926	Peter Heenan	Liberal	Peter Heenan	Liberal	Recontested upon appointment as Minister of Labour	Yes
Prince Albert	November 2, 1926	William Lyon Mackenzie King	Liberal	William Lyon Mackenzie King	Liberal	Recontested upon appointment as Prime Minister.	Yes
Quebec East	November 2, 1926	Ernest Lapointe	Liberal	Ernest Lapointe	Liberal	Recontested upon appointment as Minister of Justice.	Yes
Melville	November 2, 1926	William Richard Motherwell	Liberal	William Richard Motherwell	Liberal	Recontested upon appointment as Minister of Agriculture.	Yes
Shelburne—Yarmouth	November 2, 1926	Paul Lacombe Hatfield	Liberal	James Ralston	Liberal	Called to the Senate to provide a seat for Ralston	Yes
St. James	November 2, 1926	Fernand Rinfret	Liberal	Fernand Rinfret	Liberal	Recontested upon appointment as Secretary of State of Canada.	Yes
Châteauguay—Huntingdon	November 2, 1926	James Robb	Liberal	James Robb	Liberal	Recontested upon appointment as Minister of Finance.	Yes
Edmonton West	November 2, 1926	Charles Stewart	Liberal	Charles Stewart	Liberal	Recontested upon appointment as Minister of the Interior and Mines.	Yes
Gloucester	November 2, 1926	Peter Veniot	Liberal	Peter Veniot	Liberal	Recontested upon appointment as Postmaster General.	Yes

== 15th Parliament (1926) ==
By-election	Date	Incumbent	Party	Winner	Party	Cause	Retained
Middlesex West	March 29, 1926	John Campbell Elliott	Liberal	John Campbell Elliott	Liberal	Recontested upon appointment as Minister of Labour	Yes
Regina	March 16, 1926	Francis Nicholson Darke	Liberal	Charles Avery Dunning	Liberal	Resignation to provide a seat for Dunning	Yes
Prince Albert	February 15, 1926	Charles McDonald	Liberal	William Lyon Mackenzie King	Liberal	Resignation to provide a seat for Mackenzie King	Yes
Bagot	December 7, 1925	Joseph Edmond Marcile	Liberal	Georges Dorèze Morin	Liberal	Death	Yes

== 14th Parliament (1921–1925) ==
By-election	Date	Incumbent	Party	Winner	Party	Cause	Retained
Témiscouata	December 1, 1924	Charles Arthur Gauvreau	Liberal	Jean-François Pouliot	Liberal	Death	Yes
Hastings West	November 25, 1924	Edward Guss Porter	Conservative	Charles Edward Hanna	Liberal	Resignation in protest at the James Murdock-Home Bank incident.,	No
Yale	November 6, 1924	John Armstrong MacKelvie	Conservative	Grote Stirling	Conservative	Death	Yes
Northumberland	October 7, 1924	John Morrissy	Liberal	William Bunting Snowball	Liberal	Death	Yes
Rimouski	September 2, 1924	Joseph-Émile-Stanislas-Émmanuel D'Anjou	Liberal	Eugène Fiset	Liberal	Appointed Registrar of Deeds for the County of Rimouski.	Yes
St. Antoine	September 2, 1924	Walter George Mitchell	Liberal	William James Hushion	Liberal	Resigned	Yes
Richelieu	February 27, 1924	Arthur Cardin	Liberal	Arthur Cardin	Liberal	Recontested upon appointment as Minister of Marine and Fisheries.	Yes
Kent	December 20, 1923	Auguste Théophile Léger	Liberal	Alexandre-Joseph Doucet	Conservative	Death	No
Halifax	December 5, 1923	Alexander Kenneth Maclean	Liberal	William Anderson Black	Conservative	Resignation.	No
Winnipeg North	October 24, 1923	Edward James McMurray	Liberal	Edward James McMurray	Liberal	Recontested upon appointment as Solicitor General of Canada.	Yes
Renfrew South	September 6, 1923	Thomas Andrew Low	Liberal	Thomas Andrew Low	Liberal	Recontested upon appointment as Minister of Trade and Commerce.	Yes
Pictou	September 6, 1923	Edward Mortimer Macdonald	Liberal	Edward Mortimer Macdonald	Liberal	Recontested upon appointment as Minister of National Defence.	Yes
North Cape Breton and Victoria	July 31, 1923	Daniel Duncan McKenzie	Liberal	Fenwick Lionel Kelly	Liberal	Appointed a judge of the Supreme Court of Nova Scotia	Yes
Nicolet	May 14, 1923	Arthur Trahan	Liberal	Joseph-Félix Descôteaux	Liberal	Appointed a judge of the Superior Court of Quebec	Yes
Moose Jaw	April 10, 1923	Robert Milton Johnson	Progressive	Edward Nicholas Hopkins	Progressive	Election declared void.	Yes
Essex North	March 1, 1923	William Costello Kennedy	Liberal	Albert Frederick Healy	Liberal	Death	Yes
Halifax	December 4, 1922	Edward Blackadder	Liberal	Robert Emmett Finn	Liberal	Death	Yes
Lanark	December 4, 1922	John Alexander Stewart	Conservative	Richard Franklin Preston	Conservative	Death	Yes
Jacques Cartier	November 20, 1922	David Arthur Lafortune	Liberal	Joseph-Théodule Rhéaume	Liberal	Death	Yes
Mégantic	November 20, 1922	Lucien Turcotte Pacaud	Liberal	Eusèbe Roberge	Liberal	Appointed Secretary to the Canadian High Commissioner to London.	Yes
Gloucester	November 20, 1922	Onésiphore Turgeon	Liberal	Jean George Robichaud	Liberal	Called to the Senate.	Yes
St. Johns—Iberville	August 31, 1922	Marie-Joseph Demers	Liberal	Aldéric-Joseph Benoit	Liberal	Resignation.	Yes
Kamouraska	May 15, 1922	Charles Adolphe Stein	Liberal	Joseph Georges Bouchard	Liberal	Appointed a judge of the Superior Court of Quebec.	Yes
Vaudreuil-Soulanges	March 21, 1922	Gustave Benjamin Boyer	Liberal	Joseph-Rodolphe Ouimet	Liberal	Called to the Senate.	Yes
Kootenay East	March 14, 1922	Robert Ethelbert Beattie	Liberal	James Horace King	Liberal	Resignation.	Yes
Argenteuil	February 28, 1922	Peter Robert McGibbon	Liberal	Charles Stewart	Liberal	Death	Yes
Grenville	January 26, 1922	Arza Clair Casselman	Conservative	Arthur Meighen	Conservative	Resignation to provide a seat for Meighen.	Yes
Regina	January 19, 1922	William Richard Motherwell	Liberal	William Richard Motherwell	Liberal	Recontested upon appointment as Minister of Agriculture .	Yes
Beauce	January 19, 1922	Henri Sévérin Béland	Liberal	Henri Sévérin Béland	Liberal	Recontested upon appointment as Minister of Soldiers' Civil Re-establishment.	Yes
Three Rivers and St. Maurice	January 19, 1922	Jacques Bureau	Liberal	Jacques Bureau	Liberal	Recontested upon appointment as Minister of Customs and Excise.	Yes
Westmorland	January 19, 1922	Arthur Bliss Copp	Liberal	Arthur Bliss Copp	Liberal	Recontested upon appointment as Secretary of State for Canada.	Yes
Shelburne and Queen's	January 19, 1922	William Stevens Fielding	Liberal	William Stevens Fielding	Liberal	Recontested upon appointment as Minister of Finance.	Yes
Laurier—Outremont	January 19, 1922	Lomer Gouin	Liberal	Lomer Gouin	Liberal	Recontested upon appointment as Minister of Justice.	Yes
Essex South	January 19, 1922	George Perry Graham	Liberal	George Perry Graham	Liberal	Recontested upon appointment as Minister of Militia and Defence and Minister of Naval Service.	Yes
Essex North	January 19, 1922	William Costello Kennedy	Liberal	William Costello Kennedy	Liberal	Recontested upon appointment as Minister of Railways and Canals.	Yes
York North	January 19, 1922	William Lyon Mackenzie King	Liberal	William Lyon Mackenzie King	Liberal	Recontested upon appointment as Prime Minister.	Yes
Quebec East	January 19, 1922	Ernest Lapointe	Liberal	Ernest Lapointe	Liberal	Recontested upon appointment as Minister of Marine and Fisheries .	Yes
North Cape Breton and Victoria	January 19, 1922	Daniel Duncan McKenzie	Liberal	Daniel Duncan McKenzie	Liberal	Recontested upon appointment as Solicitor General.	Yes
Kent	January 19, 1922	Archibald McCoig	Liberal	James Murdock	Liberal	Called to the Senate to provide a seat for Murdock	Yes
Russell	January 19, 1922	Charles Murphy	Liberal	Charles Murphy	Liberal	Recontested upon appointment as Postmaster General.	Yes
Châteauguay—Huntingdon	January 19, 1922	James Robb	Liberal	James Robb	Liberal	Recontested upon appointment as Minister of Trade and Commerce .	Yes

== 13th Parliament (1918–1921) ==
By-election	Date	Incumbent	Party	Winner	Party	Cause	Retained
Medicine Hat	June 27, 1921	Arthur Lewis Sifton	Unionist	Robert Gardiner	Progressive	Death	No
Yamaska	May 28, 1921	Oscar Gladu	Laurier Liberal	Aimé Boucher	Liberal	Death	Yes
York—Sunbury	May 28, 1921	Harry Fulton McLeod	Unionist	Richard Hanson	Conservative	Death	Yes
Peterborough West	February 7, 1921	John Hampden Burnham	Unionist	George Newcombe Gordon	Liberal	Resignation	No
Yale	November 22, 1920	Martin Burrell	Unionist	John Armstrong MacKelvie	Conservative	Appointed Librarian of Parliament	Yes
Elgin East	November 22, 1920	David Marshall	Unionist	Sydney Smith McDermand	United Farmers	Death	No
St. John—Albert	September 20, 1920	Rupert Wilson Wigmore	Unionist	Rupert Wilson Wigmore	Conservative	Recontested upon appointment as Minister of Customs and Inland Revenue	Yes
Colchester	September 20, 1920	Fleming Blanchard McCurdy	Unionist	Fleming Blanchard McCurdy	Nationalist Liberal	Recontested upon appointment as Minister of Public Works	Yes
Timiskaming	April 7, 1920	Francis Cochrane	Unionist	Angus McDonald	Independent	Death	No
St. James	April 7, 1920	Louis Audet Lapointe	Laurier Liberal	Fernand Rinfret	Liberal	Death	Yes
Kamouraska	March 31, 1920	Ernest Lapointe	Laurier Liberal	Charles Adolphe Stein	Liberal	Resignation to contest Quebec East by-election	Yes
Ontario North	December 9, 1919	Samuel Simpson Sharpe	Conservative	Robert Henry Halbert	Independent	Death	No
Quebec East	October 27, 1919	Wilfrid Laurier	Laurier Liberal	Ernest Lapointe	Laurier Liberal	Death	Yes
Glengarry and Stormont	October 27, 1919	John McMartin	Unionist	John Wilfred Kennedy	United Farmers	Death	No
Assiniboia	October 27, 1919	John Gillanders Turriff	Unionist	Oliver Robert Gould	United Farmers	Called to the Senate	No
Victoria City	October 27, 1919	Simon Fraser Tolmie	Unionist	Simon Fraser Tolmie	Unionist	Recontested upon appointment as Minister of Agriculture.	Yes
Prince	October 20, 1919	Joseph Read	Liberal	William Lyon Mackenzie King	Liberal	Death	Yes
Kingston	October 20, 1919	William Folger Nickle	Conservative	Henry Lumley Drayton	Unionist	Resignation	Yes
Victoria—Carleton	October 17, 1919	Frank Carvell	Unionist	Thomas Wakem Caldwell	United Farmers	Appointed Chairman of the Board of Railway Commissioners	No
Lanark	May 2, 1918	Adelbert Edward Hanna	Unionist	John Alexander Stewart	Unionist	Death	Yes

== 12th Parliament (1911–1917) ==
By-election	Date	Incumbent	Party	Winner	Party	Cause	Retained
Dorchester	January 27, 1917	Albert Sévigny	Conservative	Albert Sévigny	Conservative	Recontested upon appointment as Minister of Inland Revenue	Yes
Toronto East	December 14, 1916	Albert Edward Kemp	Conservative	Albert Edward Kemp	Conservative	Recontested upon appointment as Minister of Militia and Defence	Yes
Hochelaga	October 15, 1915	Louis Coderre	Conservative	Esioff-Léon Patenaude	Conservative	Appointed a judge of the Superior Court of Quebec	Yes
Terrebonne	February 8, 1915	Wilfrid Bruno Nantel	Conservative	Gédéon Rochon	Conservative	Appointed a Railway Commissioner	Yes
Westmorland	February 1, 1915	Henry Emmerson	Liberal	Arthur Bliss Copp	Liberal	Death	Yes
Jacques Cartier	February 1, 1915	Frederick D. Monk	Conservative	Joseph Adélard DesCarries	Conservative	Resignation (ill health)	Yes
Prince Albert	February 1, 1915	James McKay	Conservative	Samuel James Donaldson	Conservative	Appointed a judge of the Supreme Court of Saskatchewan	Yes
London	February 1, 1915	Thomas Beattie	Conservative	William Gray	Conservative	Death	Yes
Waterloo South	February 1, 1915	George Adam Clare	Conservative	Frank Stewart Scott	Conservative	Death	Yes
Champlain	November 7, 1914	Pierre Édouard Blondin	Conservative	Pierre Édouard Blondin	Conservative	Recontested upon appointment as Minister of Inland Revenue	Yes
Quebec County	November 7, 1914	Louis-Philippe Pelletier	Conservative	Thomas Chase-Casgrain	Conservative	Resignation prior to being appointed a judge	Yes
York	December 31, 1913	Oswald Smith Crocket	Conservative	Harry Fulton McLeod	Conservative	Appointed a judge of the Supreme Court of New Brunswick	Yes
Lanark South	December 13, 1913	John Graham Haggart	Conservative	Adelbert Edward Hanna	Conservative	Death	Yes
Macdonald	December 13, 1913	Alexander Morrison	Conservative	Alexander Morrison	Conservative	Election declared void	Yes
Bruce South	October 30, 1913	James J. Donnelly	Conservative	Reuben Eldridge Truax	Liberal	Called to the Senate	No
Middlesex East	October 21, 1913	Peter Elson	Conservative	Samuel Francis Glass	Conservative	Death	Yes
Châteauguay	October 11, 1913	James Pollock Brown	Liberal	James Morris	Conservative	Death	No
Portage la Prairie	July 19, 1913	Arthur Meighen	Conservative	Arthur Meighen	Conservative	Recontested upon appointment as Solicitor General	Yes
Hochelaga	November 19, 1912	Louis Coderre	Conservative	Louis Coderre	Conservative	Recontested upon appointment as Secretary of State for Canada	Yes
Carleton	October 30, 1912	Edward Kidd	Conservative	William Foster Garland	Conservative	Death	Yes
Richelieu	October 24, 1912	Arthur Cardin	Liberal	Arthur Cardin	Liberal	Election declared void	Yes
Macdonald	October 12, 1912	William D. Staples	Conservative	Alexander Morrison	Conservative	Appointed Grain Commissioner for Canada	Yes
Simcoe South	June 10, 1912	Haughton Lennox	Conservative	William Alves Boys	Conservative	Appointed a judge	Yes
Kootenay	May 30, 1912	Arthur Samuel Goodeve	Conservative	Robert Francis Green	Conservative	Appointed a Railway Commissioner	Yes
Renfrew South	February 22, 1912	Thomas Andrew Low	Liberal	George Perry Graham	Liberal	Resignation	Yes
Nipissing	November 8, 1911	George Gordon	Conservative	Francis Cochrane	Conservative	Called to the Senate	Yes
Leeds	November 6, 1911	George Taylor	Conservative	William Thomas White	Conservative	Called to the Senate	Yes
Yale—Cariboo	November 4, 1911	Martin Burrell	Conservative	Martin Burrell	Conservative	Recontested upon appointment as Minister of Agriculture	Yes
Halifax	October 27, 1911	Robert Borden	Conservative	Robert Borden	Conservative	Recontested upon appointment as Prime Minister	Yes
Elgin West	October 27, 1911	Thomas Wilson Crothers	Conservative	Thomas Wilson Crothers	Conservative	Recontested upon appointment as Minister of Labour	Yes
St. Anne	October 27, 1911	Charles Doherty	Conservative	Charles Doherty	Conservative	Recontested upon appointment as Minister of Justice	Yes
Toronto North	October 27, 1911	George Eulas Foster	Conservative	George Eulas Foster	Conservative	Recontested upon appointment as Minister of Trade and Commerce	Yes
City and County of St. John	October 27, 1911	John Waterhouse Daniel	Conservative	John Douglas Hazen	Conservative	Resignation to provide a seat for Hazen	Yes
Victoria	October 27, 1911	Sam Hughes	Liberal-Conservative	Sam Hughes	Liberal-Conservative	Recontested upon appointment as Minister of Militia and Defence	Yes
Jacques Cartier	October 27, 1911	Frederick Debartzch Monk	Conservative	Frederick Debartzch Monk	Conservative	Recontested upon appointment as Minister of Public Works	Yes
Terrebonne	October 27, 1911	Wilfrid Bruno Nantel	Conservative	Wilfrid Bruno Nantel	Conservative	Recontested upon appointment as Minister of Inland Revenue	Yes
Quebec County	October 27, 1911	Louis-Philippe Pelletier	Conservative	Louis-Philippe Pelletier	Conservative	Recontested upon appointment as Postmaster-General	Yes
Grenville	October 27, 1911	John Dowsley Reid	Conservative	John Dowsley Reid	Conservative	Recontested upon appointment as Minister of Customs	Yes
Marquette	October 27, 1911	William James Roche	Conservative	William James Roche	Conservative	Recontested upon appointment as Secretary of State for Canada	Yes
Winnipeg	October 27, 1911	Alexander Haggart	Conservative	Robert Rogers	Conservative	Resignation to provide a seat for Rogers	Yes

== 11th Parliament (1909–1911) ==
By-election	Date	Incumbent	Party	Winner	Party	Cause	Retained
Drummond—Arthabaska	November 3, 1910	Louis Lavergne	Liberal	Arthur Gilbert	Nationalist	Called to the Senate	No
City of Ottawa	January 29, 1910	Sir Wilfrid Laurier	Liberal	Albert Allard	Liberal	Chose to sit for Quebec East.	Yes
Dufferin	December 22, 1909	John Barr	Conservative	John Best	Conservative	Death	Yes
Lunenburg	December 22, 1909	Alexander Kenneth Maclean	Liberal	John Drew Sperry	Liberal	Resignation	Yes
Middlesex West	November 20, 1909	William Samuel Calvert	Liberal	Duncan Campbell Ross	Liberal	Appointed to the National Transcontinental Railway Commission	Yes
Essex North	November 20, 1909	Robert Franklin Sutherland	Liberal	Oliver James Wilcox	Conservative	Appointed a judge	No
Lotbinière	October 26, 1909	Edmond Fortier	Liberal	Edmond Fortier	Liberal	Election declared void	Yes
Strathcona	October 20, 1909	Wilbert McIntyre	Liberal	James McCrie Douglas	Liberal	Death	Yes
Montcalm	September 25, 1909	François Octave Dugas	Liberal	David Arthur Lafortune	Independent Liberal	Appointed a judge of the Superior Court of Quebec	No
Waterloo North	June 21, 1909	William Lyon Mackenzie King	Liberal	William Lyon Mackenzie King	Liberal	Recontested upon appointment as Minister of Labour.	Yes
Carleton	February 22, 1909	Robert Borden	Conservative	Edward Kidd	Conservative	Chose to sit for Halifax	Yes
Comox—Atlin	February 8, 1909	William Sloan	Liberal	William Templeman	Liberal	Resignation to provide a seat for Templeman	Yes

== 10th Parliament (1905–1908) ==
By-election	Date	Incumbent	Party	Winner	Party	Cause	Retained
Stanstead	January 22, 1908	Henry Lovell	Liberal	Charles Henry Lovell	Liberal	Death	Yes
Huron South	January 22, 1908	Benjamin B. Gunn	Conservative	Murdo Young McLean	Liberal	Death	No
Nicolet	December 30, 1907	Charles Ramsay Devlin	Liberal	Gustave-Adolphe-Narcisse Turcotte	Liberal	Resignation upon appointment to the provincial cabinet of Quebec	Yes
City of Ottawa	December 23, 1907	Napoléon Antoine Belcourt	Liberal	William H. Hutchison	Liberal	Called to the Senate	Yes
Labelle	December 23, 1907	Henri Bourassa	Liberal	Charles Beautron Major	Liberal	Resignation to enter provincial politics	Yes
York Centre	December 23, 1907	Archibald Campbell	Liberal	Peter Douglas McLean	Liberal	Called to the Senate	Yes
Colchester	November 28, 1907	Frederick Andrew Laurence	Liberal	John Stanfield	Conservative	Appointed a judge	No
London	October 29, 1907	C. S. Hyman	Liberal	Thomas Beattie	Conservative	Resignation	No
Northumberland East	October 29, 1907	Edward Cochrane	Conservative	Charles Lewis Owen	Conservative	Death	Yes
Wellington North	October 29, 1907	Thomas Martin	Liberal	Alexander Munro Martin	Liberal	Death	Yes
Brockville	September 18, 1907	Daniel Derbyshire	Liberal	George Perry Graham	Liberal	Called to the Senate	Yes
City and County of St. John	September 18, 1907	Alfred Augustus Stockton	Conservative	William Pugsley	Liberal	Death	No
Richelieu	March 7, 1907	Arthur-Aimé Bruneau	Liberal	Adélard Lanctôt	Liberal	Appointed a judge of the Superior Court of Quebec	Yes
L'Assomption	March 7, 1907	Romuald-Charlemagne Laurier	Liberal	Ruben Charles Laurier	Liberal	Death	Yes
Victoria	March 5, 1907	John Costigan	Liberal	Pius Michaud	Liberal	Called to the Senate	Yes
Three Rivers and St. Maurice	February 28, 1907	Jacques Bureau	Liberal	Jacques Bureau	Liberal	Recontested upon appointment as Solicitor General	Yes
Nicolet	December 29, 1906	Rodolphe Lemieux	Liberal	Charles Ramsay Devlin	Liberal	Chose to sit for Gaspé	Yes
St. Ann	November 21, 1906	Daniel Gallery	Liberal	Joseph Charles Walsh	Liberal	Election declared void	Yes
St. Mary	November 21, 1906	Camille Piché	Liberal	Médéric Martin	Liberal	Appointed Police Magistrate in Montreal.	Yes
Shelburne and Queen's	October 31, 1906	William Stevens Fielding	Liberal	William Stevens Fielding	Liberal	Election declared void	Yes
Bruce North	October 30, 1906	Leonard Thomas Bland	Liberal-Conservative	John Tolmie	Liberal	Death	No
Quebec County	October 23, 1906	Charles Fitzpatrick	Liberal	Lorenzo Robitaille	Independent Liberal	Appointed Chief Justice of Canada	No
St. Johns—Iberville	October 16, 1906	Louis Philippe Demers	Liberal	Marie Joseph Demers	Liberal	Appointed Puisne Judge of the Superior Court of Quebec	Yes
Elgin East	October 14, 1906	Andrew B. Ingram	Liberal-Conservative	David Marshall	Conservative	Appointed Vice Chairman of the Ontario Railway and Municipal Commission	Yes
Renfrew North	October 9, 1906	Peter White	Conservative	Gerald Verner White	Conservative	Death	Yes
Strathcona	April 5, 1906	Peter Talbot	Liberal	Wilbert McIntyre	Liberal	Called to the Senate	Yes
Cape Breton North and Victoria	March 14, 1906	Daniel Duncan McKenzie	Liberal	Alexander Charles Ross	Liberal	Appointed a judge	Yes
Victoria City	March 6, 1906	George Riley	Liberal	William Templeman	Liberal	Resignation to provide a seat for Templeman	Yes
Maisonneuve	February 23, 1906	Raymond Préfontaine	Liberal	Alphonse Verville	Labour	Death	No
Assiniboia West	February 6, 1906	Thomas Walter Scott	Liberal	William Erskine Knowles	Liberal	Resignation to enter provincial politics in Saskatchewan	Yes
Saskatchewan	February 6, 1906	John Henderson Lamont	Liberal	George Ewan McCraney	Liberal	Resignation to enter provincial politics in Saskatchewan	Yes
Town of Sherbrooke	February 6, 1906	Arthur Norreys Worthington	Conservative	Arthur Norreys Worthington	Conservative	Election declared void	Yes
Compton	January 4, 1906	Aylmer Byron Hunt	Liberal	Aylmer Byron Hunt	Liberal	Election declared void	Yes
York North	November 22, 1905	William Mulock	Liberal	Allen Bristol Aylesworth	Liberal	Appointed a judge	Yes
Antigonish	November 22, 1905	Colin McIsaac	Liberal	William Chisholm	Liberal	Appointed a Railway Commissioner	Yes
Lambton West	November 22, 1905	Thomas George Johnston	Liberal	Frederick Forsyth Pardee	Liberal	Death	Yes
Wentworth	November 22, 1905	E. D. Smith	Conservative	E. D. Smith	Conservative	Election declared void	Yes
London	June 13, 1905	C. S. Hyman	Liberal	C. S. Hyman	Liberal	Recontested upon appointment as Minister of Public Works	Yes
Oxford North	June 13, 1905	James Sutherland	Liberal	George Smith	Liberal	Death	Yes
Lévis	June 6, 1905	Louis Julien Demers	Liberal	Louis Auguste Carrier	Liberal	Death	Yes
Edmonton	April 25, 1905	Frank Oliver	Liberal	Frank Oliver	Liberal	Recontested upon appointment as Minister of the Interior.	Yes
Toronto Centre	April 11, 1905	Edward Frederick Clarke	Conservative	Edmund James Bristol	Conservative	Death	Yes
Wright	February 13, 1905	Wilfrid Laurier	Liberal	Emmanuel Berchmans Devlin	Liberal	Chose to sit for Quebec East	Yes
Carleton	February 4, 1905	Edward Kidd	Conservative	Robert L. Borden	Conservative	Resignation to provide a seat for Borden	Yes
Quebec-Centre	January 19, 1905	Arthur Cyrille Albert Malouin	Liberal	Arthur Lachance	Liberal	Appointed a judge of the Superior Court of Quebec	Yes

== 9th Parliament (1901–1904) ==
By-election	Date	Incumbent	Party	Winner	Party	Cause	Retained
Guysborough	March 16, 1904	Duncan Cameron Fraser	Liberal	John Howard Sinclair	Liberal	Appointed to Supreme Court of Nova Scotia	Yes
Gaspé	February 20, 1904	Rodolphe Lemieux	Liberal	Rodolphe Lemieux	Liberal	Recontested upon appointment as Solicitor-General	Yes
Lambton East	February 16, 1904	Oliver Simmons	Conservative	Joseph Elijah Armstrong	Conservative	Death	Yes
St. Hyacinthe	February 16, 1904	Michel Esdras Bernier	Liberal	Jean Baptiste Blanchet	Liberal	Appointed a Railway Commissioner	Yes
City of St. John	February 16, 1904	Andrew George Blair	Liberal	John Waterhouse Daniel	Conservative	Appointed head of the Board of Railway Commissioners	No
Bruce East	February 16, 1904	Henry Cargill	Conservative	James J. Donnelly	Conservative	Death	Yes
St. James	February 16, 1904	Joseph Brunet	Liberal	Honoré Hippolyte Achille Gervais	Liberal	Election declared void	Yes
West Queen's	February 16, 1904	Donald Farquharson	Liberal	Horace Haszard	Liberal	Death	Yes
Montmagny	February 16, 1904	Pierre-Raymond-Léonard Martineau	Liberal	Armand Lavergne	Liberal	Death	Yes
Hochelaga	February 16, 1904	Joseph Alexandre Camille Madore	Liberal	Louis-Alfred-Adhémar Rivet	Liberal	Appointed Puisne Judge of the Supreme Court of Quebec	Yes
Kamouraska	February 12, 1904	Henry George Carroll	Liberal	Ernest Lapointe	Liberal	Appointed a judge	Yes
Rouville	January 30, 1904	Louis-Philippe Brodeur	Liberal	Louis-Philippe Brodeur	Liberal	Recontested upon appointment as Minister of Inland Revenue	Yes
Westmorland	January 30, 1904	Henry Emmerson	Liberal	Henry Emmerson	Liberal	Recontested upon appointment as Minister of Railways and Canals	Yes
Russell	April 20, 1903	William C. Edwards	Liberal	David Wardrope Wallace	Liberal	Called to Senate	Yes
Ontario North	March 10, 1903	Angus McLeod	Liberal-Conservative	George Davidson Grant	Liberal	Death	No
Maskinongé	March 3, 1903	Joseph-Hormisdas Legris	Liberal	Hormidas Mayrand	Liberal	Called to Senate	Yes
Terrebonne	February 24, 1903	Raymond Préfontaine	Liberal	Samuel Desjardins	Liberal	Recontested upon ministerial appointment. Préfontaine was elected in two ridings simultaneously and chose to stand for re-election in Maisonneuve	Yes
Two Mountains	February 24, 1903	Joseph Arthur Calixte Éthier	Liberal	Joseph Arthur Calixte Éthier	Liberal	Election declared void	Yes
Grey North	February 24, 1903	Edward Henry Horsey	Liberal	Thomas Inkerman Thomson	Conservative	Death	No
Burrard	February 4, 1903	George Ritchie Maxwell	Liberal	Robert George Macpherson	Liberal	Death	Yes
Maisonneuve	December 9, 1902	Raymond Préfontaine	Liberal	Raymond Préfontaine	Liberal	Recontested upon appointment as Minister of Marine and Fisheries	Yes
Argenteuil	December 3, 1902	Thomas Christie	Liberal	Thomas Christie, Jr.	Liberal	Death	Yes
Yarmouth	December 3, 1902	Thomas Barnard Flint	Liberal	Bowman Brown Law	Liberal	Appointed Clerk of the House of Commons	Yes
Yukon	December 2, 1902	New Seat		James Hamilton Ross	Liberal	Newly created electoral district under The Yukon Territory Representation Act 1902	N.A.
Beauharnois	March 26, 1902	George di Madeiros Loy	Liberal	George di Madeiros Loy	Liberal	Election declared void	Yes
Kamouraska	February 28, 1902	Henry George Carroll	Liberal	Henry George Carroll	Liberal	Recontested upon appointment as Solicitor General	Yes
Lisgar	February 18, 1902	Robert Lorne Richardson	Independent	Duncan Alexander Stewart	Liberal	Election declared void	No
Quebec West	January 29, 1902	Richard Reid Dobell	Liberal	William Power	Liberal	Death	Yes
Oxford North	January 29, 1902	James Sutherland	Liberal	James Sutherland	Liberal	Recontested upon appointment as Minister of Marine and Fisheries	Yes
Victoria	January 28, 1902	Edward Gawler Prior	Conservative	George Riley	Liberal	Election declared void	No
Laval	January 15, 1902	Thomas Fortin	Liberal	Joseph-Édouard-Émile Léonard	Conservative	Appointed a judge of the Superior Court of Quebec	No
Addington	January 15, 1902	John William Bell	Conservative	Melzar Avery	Conservative	Death	Yes
Durham West	January 15, 1902	Charles Jonas Thornton	Liberal	Robert Beith	Conservative	Election declared void.	No
St. James	January 15, 1902	Odilon Desmarais	Liberal	Joseph-Édouard-Émile Léonard	Liberal	Appointed a judge of the Superior Court of Quebec	Yes
York West	January 15, 1902	Nathaniel Clarke Wallace	Conservative	Archibald Campbell	Liberal	Death	No
L'Islet	January 15, 1902	Arthur Miville Déchêne	Liberal	Onésiphore Carbonneau	Liberal	Called to the Senate	Yes
West Queen's	January 15, 1902	Louis Henry Davies	Liberal	Donald Farquharson	Liberal	Appointed a justice of the Supreme Court of Canada	Yes
Kingston	January 15, 1902	Byron Moffatt Britton	Liberal	William Harty	Liberal	Appointed a judge of the Court of King's Bench for Ontario	Yes
Hastings West	January 15, 1902	Henry Corby	Conservative	Edward Guss Porter	Conservative	Resignation	Yes
Beauce	January 8, 1902	Joseph Godbout	Liberal	Henri Sévérin Béland	Liberal	Called to the Senate	Yes
York	December 28, 1901	Alexander Gibson	Liberal	Alexander Gibson	Liberal	Election declared void	Yes
East Queen's	March 20, 1901	Donald Alexander MacKinnon	Liberal	Donald Alexander MacKinnon	Liberal	Election declared void	Yes
Bruce North	March 20, 1901	Alexander McNeill	Liberal-Conservative	James Halliday	Conservative	Election declared void	Yes

== 8th Parliament (1896–1900) ==
By-election	Date	Incumbent	Party	Winner	Party	Cause	Retained
St. Hyacinthe	July 4, 1900	Michel-Esdras Bernier	Liberal	Michel-Esdras Bernier	Liberal	Recontested upon appointment as Minister of Inland Revenue	Yes
Lotbinière	January 25, 1900	Côme Isaïe Rinfret	Liberal	Edmond Fortier	Liberal	Appointment as a revenue inspector	Yes
Town of Sherbrooke	January 25, 1900	William Bullock Ives	Conservative	John McIntosh	Conservative	Death	Yes
Winnipeg	January 25, 1900	Richard Willis Jameson	Liberal	Arthur Puttee	Labour	Death	Yes
Berthier	January 18, 1900	Cléophas Beausoleil	Liberal	Joseph Éloi Archambault	Liberal	Appointed postmaster of Montreal	Yes
Labelle	January 18, 1900	Henri Bourassa	Liberal	Henri Bourassa	Independent	Resignation to recontest in protest at Canada's participation in the Boer War	No
Chambly—Verchères	January 18, 1900	Christophe-Alphonse Geoffrion	Liberal	Victor Geoffrion	Liberal	Death	Yes
Ontario West	January 18, 1900	James David Edgar	Liberal	Isaac James Gould	Liberal	Death	Yes
Brockville	April 20, 1899	John Fisher Wood	Liberal-Conservative	William Henry Comstock	Liberal	Death	No
Lévis	March 22, 1899	Pierre Malcom Guay	Liberal	Louis-Jules Demers	Liberal	Death	Yes
Huron West	February 21, 1899	Malcolm Colin Cameron	Liberal	Robert Holmes	Liberal	Appointed Lieutenant-Governor of the North-West Territories	Yes
East Prince	December 14, 1898	John Yeo	Liberal	John Howatt Bell	Liberal	Called to the Senate	Yes
Lambton West	December 14, 1898	James Frederick Lister	Liberal	Thomas George Johnston	Liberal	Appointed to the Court of Appeal	
Bagot	December 14, 1898	Flavien Dupont	Conservative	Joseph Edmond Marcile	Liberal	Death	No
Montmagny	December 14, 1898	Philippe-Auguste Choquette	Liberal	Pierre-Raymond-Léonard Martineau	Liberal	Appointed a judge of the Superior Court of Quebec	Yes
Simcoe North	December 14, 1898	Dalton McCarthy	McCarthyite	Leighton McCarthy	Independent (McCarthyite)	Death	Yes
West Prince	April 13, 1898	Stanislaus Francis Perry	Liberal	Bernard Donald McLellan	Liberal	Death	Yes
Quebec-Centre	January 24, 1898	François Langelier	Liberal	Arthur Cyrille Albert Malouin	Liberal	Appointed a judge of the Superior Court of Quebec	Yes
Nicolet	December 21, 1897	Fabien Boisvert	Conservative	Joseph Hector Leduc	Liberal	Death	No
Toronto Centre	November 30, 1897	William Lount	Liberal	George Hope Bertram	Liberal	Resignation	Yes
Drummond—Arthabaska	November 13, 1897	Joseph Lavergne	Liberal	Louis Lavergne	Liberal	Appointed a judge of the Superior Court of Quebec	Yes
Témiscouata	November 6, 1897	Charles-Eugène Pouliot	Liberal	Charles Arthur Gauvreau	Liberal	Death	Yes
Rimouski	November 6, 1897	Jean-Baptiste Romuald Fiset	Liberal	Jean Auguste Ross	Liberal	Called to the Senate	Yes
West Prince	April 27, 1897	Edward Hackett	Liberal-Conservative	Stanislaus Francis Perry	Liberal	Election declared void	No
Macdonald	April 27, 1897	Nathaniel Boyd	Conservative	John Gunion Rutherford	Liberal	Election declared void	No
Winnipeg	April 27, 1897	Hugh John Macdonald	Liberal-Conservative	Richard Willis Jameson	Liberal	Election declared void	No
Colchester	April 20, 1897	Wilbert David Dimock	Conservative	Firman McClure	Liberal	Election declared void	No
Champlain	April 7, 1897	François-Arthur Marcotte	Conservative	François-Arthur Marcotte	Conservative	Election declared void	Yes
Wright	March 23, 1897	Charles Ramsay Devlin	Liberal	Louis Napoléon Champagne	Liberal	Appointed Canadian trade commissioner to Ireland	Yes
Bonaventure	March 17, 1897	William LeBoutillier Fauvel	Liberal	Jean-François Guité	Liberal	Death	Yes
Simcoe East	February 4, 1897	William Humphrey Bennett	Conservative	William Humphrey Bennett	Conservative	Election declared void	Yes
Ontario North	February 4, 1897	John Alexander McGillivray	Conservative	Duncan Graham	Independent Liberal	Election declared void	No
Brant South	February 4, 1897	Robert Henry	Conservative	Charles Bernhard Heyd	Liberal	Election declared void	No
Saskatchewan (Provisional District)	December 19, 1896	Wilfrid Laurier	Liberal	Thomas Osborne Davis	Liberal	Laurier was elected to two seats, resigned to run in ministerial by-election in Quebec East	Yes
Cornwall and Stormont	December 19, 1896	Darby Bergin	Liberal-Conservative	John Goodall Snetsinger	Liberal	Death	No
Brandon	November 27, 1896	Dalton McCarthy	McCarthyite	Clifford Sifton	Liberal	Chose to sit for Simcoe North	No
Sunbury—Queen's	August 25, 1896	George G. King	Liberal	Andrew George Blair	Liberal	Called to Senate	Yes
Grey North	August 25, 1896	John Clark	Liberal	William Paterson	Liberal	Death	Yes
Shelburne and Queen's	August 5, 1896	Francis Gordon Forbes	Liberal	William Stevens Fielding	Liberal	Appointed Sub-Collector of Customs	Yes
St. Johns—Iberville	August 3, 1896	François Béchard	Liberal	Joseph Israël Tarte	Liberal	Called to the Senate	Yes
Quebec County	July 30, 1896	Charles Fitzpatrick	Liberal	Charles Fitzpatrick	Liberal	Recontested upon appointment as Solicitor General	Yes
Kings	July 30, 1896	Frederick William Borden	Liberal	Frederick William Borden	Liberal	Recontested upon appointment as Minister of Militia and Defence	Yes
Oxford South	July 30, 1896	Richard John Cartwright	Liberal	Richard John Cartwright	Liberal	Recontested upon appointment as Minister of Trade and Commerce	Yes
West Queen's	July 30, 1896	Louis Henry Davies	Liberal	Louis Henry Davies	Liberal	Recontested upon appointment as Minister of Marine and Fisheries	Yes
Brome	July 30, 1896	Sydney Arthur Fisher	Liberal	Sydney Arthur Fisher	Liberal	Recontested upon appointment as Minister of Agriculture	Yes
Portneuf	July 30, 1896	Henri-Gustave Joly de Lotbinière	Liberal	Henri-Gustave Joly de Lotbinière	Liberal	Recontested upon appointment as Controller of Inland Revenue	Yes
York North	July 30, 1896	William Mulock	Liberal	William Mulock	Liberal	Recontested upon appointment as Postmaster-General	Yes
Quebec East	July 30, 1896	Wilfrid Laurier	Liberal	Wilfrid Laurier	Liberal	Recontested upon appointment as Prime Minister	Yes

== 7th Parliament (1891–1896) ==
By-election	Date	Incumbent	Party	Winner	Party	Cause	Retained
Northumberland	February 6, 1896	Michael Adams	Conservative	James Robinson	Conservative	Called to the Senate.	Yes
Cape Breton	February 4, 1896	David MacKeen	Conservative	Charles Tupper	Conservative	Resignation to provide a seat for Tupper.	Yes
Charlevoix	January 27, 1896	Henry Simard	Liberal	Louis Charles Alphonse Angers	Liberal	Death	Yes
Huron West	January 14, 1896	James Colebrooke Patterson	Conservative	Malcolm Colin Cameron	Liberal	Appointed Lieutenant-Governor of Manitoba.	No
Victoria	January 6, 1896	Edward Gawler Prior	Conservative	Edward Gawler Prior	Conservative	Recontested upon appointment as Minister of Inland Revenue.	Yes
Montreal Centre	December 27, 1895	John Joseph Curran	Conservative	James McShane	Liberal	Appointed a judge of the Superior Court of Quebec.	No
Cardwell	December 24, 1895	Robert Smeaton White	Conservative	William Stubbs	McCarthyite	Resignation.	No
Ontario North	December 12, 1895	Frank Madill	Conservative	John Alexander McGillivray	Conservative	Death.	Yes
Jacques Cartier	November 30, 1895	Désiré Girouard	Conservative	Napoléon Charbonneau	Liberal	Appointed a judge of the Supreme Court of Canada.	No
Westmorland	August 24, 1895	Josiah Wood	Conservative	Henry A. Powell	Liberal-Conservative	Called to the Senate.	Yes
Verchères	April 17, 1895	Félix Geoffrion	Liberal	Christophe-Alphonse Geoffrion	Liberal	Death.	Yes
Quebec West	April 17, 1895	John Hearn	Conservative	Thomas McGreevy	Liberal-Conservative	Death.	Yes
Antigonish	April 17, 1895	John Sparrow David Thompson	Liberal-Conservative	Colin Francis McIsaac	Liberal	Death	No
Haldimand	April 17, 1895	Walter Humphries Montague	Conservative	Walter Humphries Montague	Conservative	Recontested upon appointment as Secretary of State for Canada.	Yes
Cumberland	January 15, 1895	Arthur Rupert Dickey	Conservative	Arthur Rupert Dickey	Conservative	Recontested upon appointment as Secretary of State for Canada.	Yes
Hastings West	July 4, 1894	Henry Corby, Jr.	Conservative	Henry Corby, Jr.	Conservative	resignation to recontest due to selling methylated spirits to the government.	Yes
Gloucester	May 5, 1894	Kennedy Francis Burns	Conservative	Théotime Blanchard	Conservative	Called to the Senate.	Yes
Ottawa (City of)	December 7, 1893	Charles H. Mackintosh	Conservative	Honoré Robillard	Liberal-Conservative	Appointed Lieutenant Governor of the North-West Territories.	Yes
Winnipeg	November 22, 1893	Hugh John Macdonald	Liberal-Conservative	Joseph Martin	Liberal	Resignation	No
Vancouver	May 2, 1893	David William Gordon	Liberal-Conservative	Andrew Haslam	Liberal-Conservative	Death	Yes
Vaudreuil	April 12, 1893	Hugh McMillan	Conservative	Henry Stanislas Harwood	Liberal	Election declared void.	No
Middlesex South	March 22, 1893	James Armstrong	Liberal	Robert Boston	Liberal	Death	Yes
Terrebonne	January 10, 1893	Joseph-Adolphe Chapleau	Conservative	Pierre-Julien Leclair	Conservative	Appointed Lieutenant-Governor of Quebec.	Yes
L'Islet	January 5, 1893	Louis-Georges Desjardins	Conservative	Joseph-Israël Tarte	Independent	Appointed Clerk of the Legislative Assembly of Quebec.	No
Town of Sherbrooke	December 21, 1892	William Bullock Ives	Conservative	William Bullock Ives	Conservative	Recontested upon appointment as President of the Privy Council.	Yes
York West	December 21, 1892	Nathaniel Clarke Wallace	Conservative	Nathaniel Clarke Wallace	Conservative	Recontested upon appointment as Controller of Customs.	Yes
Brockville	December 21, 1892	John Fisher Wood	Liberal-Conservative	John Fisher Wood	Liberal-Conservative	Recontested upon appointment as Controller of Inland Revenue.	Yes
Hastings North	December 20, 1892	Mackenzie Bowell	Conservative	Alexander Augustus Williamson Carscallen	Conservative	Called to the Senate.	Yes
Montreal Centre	December 18, 1892	John Joseph Curran	Conservative	John Joseph Curran	Conservative	Recontested upon appointment as Solicitor General.	Yes
Soulanges	December 13, 1892	James William Bain	Conservative	James William Bain	Conservative	Election declared void.	Yes
Kent	December 6, 1892	Édouard H. Léger	Conservative	George McInerney	Conservative	Death	Yes
City and County of St. John	November 22, 1892	Charles Nelson Skinner	Liberal	John Alexander Chesley	Conservative	Appointed a judge.	No
Assiniboia East	November 21, 1892	Edgar Dewdney	Conservative	William Walter McDonald	Conservative	Appointed Lieutenant-Governor of British Columbia.	Yes
Selkirk	November 2, 1892	Thomas Mayne Daly	Liberal-Conservative	Thomas Mayne Daly	Liberal-Conservative	Recontested upon appointment as Minister of the Interior and Superintendent General of Indian Affairs.	Yes
Hochelaga	October 21, 1892	Alphonse Desjardins	Conservative	Séverin Lachapelle	Conservative	Called to the Senate.	Yes
Chicoutimi—Saguenay	August 16, 1892	Paul Vilmond Savard	Liberal	Louis-de-Gonzague Belley	Conservative	Election declared void.	No
Marquette	July 15, 1892	Robert Watson	Liberal	Nathaniel Boyd	Conservative	Resignation to enter provincial politics in Manitoba.	No
Pontiac	June 26, 1892	Thomas Murray	Liberal	John Bryson	Conservative	Election declared void.	No
Frontenac	June 10, 1892	George Airey Kirkpatrick	Conservative	Hiram Augustus Calvin	Independent Conservative	Appointed Lieutenant Governor of Ontario.	No
L'Assomption	May 31, 1892	Joseph Gauthier	Liberal	Hormidas Jeannotte	Conservative	Election declared void.	No
Perth North	May 19, 1892	James Nicol Grieve	Liberal	James Nicol Grieve	Liberal	Election declared void.	Yes
York East	May 11, 1892	Alexander Mackenzie	Liberal	William Findlay Maclean	Independent Conservative	Death	No
Welland	April 29, 1892	William Manley German	Liberal	James A. Lowell	Liberal	Election declared void.	Yes
Carleton	April 6, 1892	Newton Ramsay Colter	Liberal	Newton Ramsay Colter	Liberal	Election declared void.	Yes
Prescott	March 30, 1892	Isidore Proulx	Liberal	Isidore Proulx	Liberal	Election declared void.	Yes
Northumberland West	March 15, 1892	John Hargraft	Liberal	George Guillet	Conservative	Election declared void.	No
Monck	March 12, 1892	John Brown	Liberal	Arthur Boyle	Conservative	Election declared void.	No
Brome	March 10, 1892	Eugène Alphonse Dyer	Conservative	Eugène Alphonse Dyer	Conservative	Election declared void.	Yes
Perth South	March 10, 1892	James Trow	Liberal	William Pridham	Conservative	Election declared void.	No
Montmorency	March 10, 1892	Joseph Israël Tarte	Conservative	Arthur-Joseph Turcotte	Conservative	Election declared void.	Yes
Montcalm	March 5, 1892	Joseph Louis Euclide Dugas	Conservative	Joseph Louis Euclide Dugas	Conservative	Election declared void.	Yes
Vaudreuil	February 29, 1892	Henry Stanislas Harwood	Liberal	Hugh McMillan	Conservative	Election declared void.	No
Two Mountains	February 27, 1892	Jean-Baptiste Daoust	Conservative	Joseph Girouard	Conservative	Death	Yes
Quebec West	February 26, 1892	Thomas McGreevy	Liberal-Conservative	John Hearn	Conservative	Expelled from the House of Commons for corruption.	Yes
London	February 26, 1892	C.S. Hyman	Liberal	John Carling	Liberal-Conservative	Election declared void.	No
Queen's	February 25, 1892	George Gerald King	Liberal	George Frederick Baird	Conservative	King being declared not duly elected, 25 February 1892, George Frederick Baird was declared elected by a court decision.	No
Simcoe East	February 25, 1892	Philip Howard Spohn	Liberal	William Humphrey Bennett	Conservative	Election declared void.	No
Huron West	February 22, 1892	Malcolm Colin Cameron	Liberal	James Colebrooke Patterson	Conservative	Election declared void.	No
Ontario South	February 20, 1892	James Ironside Davidson	Liberal	William Smith	Conservative	Election declared void.	No
Hastings East	February 20, 1892	Samuel Barton Burdett	Liberal	William Barton Northrup	Conservative	Death	No
King's	February 13, 1892	Frederick William Borden	Liberal	Frederick William Borden	Liberal	Election declared void.	Yes
Digby	February 13, 1892	Edward Charles Bowers	Liberal	Edward Charles Bowers	Liberal	Election declared void.	Yes
Elgin East	February 12, 1892	Andrew B. Ingram	Liberal-Conservative	Andrew B. Ingram	Liberal-Conservative	Election declared void.	Yes
Bruce East	February 11, 1892	Reuben Eldridge Truax	Liberal	Henry Cargill	Conservative	Election declared void.	No
Victoria South	February 11, 1892	Charles Fairbairn	Liberal-Conservative	Charles Fairbairn	Liberal-Conservative	Election declared void.	Yes
Peel	February 11, 1892	Joseph Featherston	Liberal	Joseph Featherston	Liberal	Election declared void.	Yes
Victoria North	February 11, 1892	John Augustus Barron	Liberal	Sam Hughes	Liberal-Conservative	Election declared void.	No
Halifax	February 11, 1892	Thomas Edward Kenny and John Fitzwilliam Stairs	Conservative	Thomas Edward Kenny and John Fitzwilliam Stairs	Conservative	Election declared void. (Double member constituency)	Yes
Middlesex East	February 11, 1892	Joseph Henry Marshall	Conservative	Joseph Henry Marshall	Conservative	Election declared void.	Yes
Queens	February 9, 1892	Francis Gordon Forbes	Liberal	Francis Gordon Forbes	Liberal	Election declared void.	Yes
Prince Edward	February 4, 1892	Archibald Campbell Miller	Conservative	Archibald Campbell Miller	Conservative	Election declared void.	Yes
Lennox	February 4, 1892	David Wright Allison	Liberal	Uriah Wilson	Conservative	Election declared void.	No
Soulanges	February 3, 1892	Joseph Octave Mousseau	Independent	James William Bain	Conservative	Election declared void.	No
Cumberland	January 30, 1892	Arthur Rupert Dickey	Conservative	Arthur Rupert Dickey	Conservative	Election declared void.	Yes
Lincoln and Niagara	January 28, 1892	William Gibson	Liberal	William Gibson	Liberal	Election declared void.	Yes
Halton	January 28, 1892	David Henderson	Conservative	David Henderson	Conservative	Election declared void.	Yes
Kingston	January 28, 1892	John A. Macdonald	Conservative	James Henry Metcalfe	Conservative	Death	Yes
Victoria	January 26, 1892	John Archibald McDonald	Conservative	John Archibald McDonald	Conservative	Election declared void.	Yes
Laval	January 25, 1892	Joseph-Aldric Ouimet	Liberal-Conservative	Joseph-Aldric Ouimet	Liberal-Conservative	Recontested upon appointment as Minister of Public Works.	Yes
Richmond	January 21, 1892	Joseph Alexander Gillies	Conservative	Joseph Alexander Gillies	Conservative	Election declared void.	Yes
Glengarry	January 14, 1892	Roderick R. McLennan	Conservative	Roderick R. McLennan	Conservative	Election declared void.	Yes
Richelieu	January 11, 1892	Hector-Louis Langevin	Conservative	Arthur-Aimé Bruneau	Liberal	Chose to sit for Trois-Rivières.	No
Lanark North	December 31, 1891	Joseph Jamieson	Conservative	Bennett Rosamond	Conservative	Appointed a county court judge.	Yes

== 6th Parliament (1887–1891) ==
By-election	Date	Incumbent	Party	Winner	Party	Cause	Retained
Victoria South	December 18, 1890	Adam Hudspeth	Conservative	Charles Fairbairn	Liberal-Conservative	Death	Yes
Napierville	December 9, 1890	Louis Sainte-Marie	Liberal	François-Xavier Paradis	Conservative	Resigned to enter provincial politics in Quebec.	No
Kent	July 31, 1890	Pierre-Amand Landry	Conservative	Édouard H. Léger	Conservative	Appointed a judge in the county court of Westmorland and Kent.	Yes
Montmorency	July 25, 1890	Charles Langelier	Liberal	Louis-Georges Desjardins	Conservative	Resignation to enter provincial politics in Quebec.	No
New Westminster	June 19, 1890	Donald Chisholm	Conservative	Gordon Edward Corbould	Conservative	Death	Yes
Lincoln and Niagara	May 23, 1890	John Charles Rykert	Conservative	John Charles Rykert	Conservative	Resignation to recontest over charges of corruption.	Yes
Ottawa (City of) (electoral district)	April 26, 1890	William Goodhue Perley	Conservative	Charles Herbert Mackintosh	Conservative	Death	Yes
Haldimand	February 20, 1890	Charles Wesley Colter	Liberal	Walter Humphries Montague	Conservative	Election declared void.	No
Stanstead	December 18, 1889	Charles Carroll Colby	Liberal-Conservative	Charles Carroll Colby	Liberal-Conservative	Recontested upon appointment as President of the Privy Council.	Yes
Victoria	October 28, 1889	Edgar Crow Baker	Conservative	Thomas Earle	Conservative	Resignation.	Yes
Compton	May 16, 1889	John Henry Pope	Liberal-Conservative	Rufus Henry Pope	Conservative	Death	Yes
Haldimand	January 30, 1889	Walter Humphries Montague	Conservative	Charles Wesley Colter	Liberal	Election declared void.	No
Provencher	January 24, 1889	Joseph Royal	Conservative	Alphonse Alfred Clément Larivière	Conservative	Appointed Lieutenant-Governor of the North West Territories.	Yes
Joliette	January 16, 1889	Édouard Guilbault	Conservative	Hilaire Neveu	Nationalist	Election declared void.	No
Cumberland	December 26, 1888	Arthur Rupert Dickey	Conservative	Arthur Rupert Dickey	Conservative	Election declared void.	Yes
Cariboo	November 22, 1888	James Reid	Liberal-Conservative	Francis Stillman Barnard	Conservative	Called to the Senate.	Yes
Northumberland East	November 21, 1888	Edward Cochrane	Conservative	Edward Cochrane	Conservative	Election declared void.	Yes
Shelburne	October 22, 1888	John Wimburne Laurie	Conservative	John Wimburne Laurie	Conservative	Election declared void.	Yes
Cardwell	October 3, 1888	Thomas White	Conservative	Robert Smeaton White	Conservative	Death	Yes
Montreal East	September 26, 1888	Charles-Joseph Coursol	Conservative	Alphonse-Télesphore Lépine	Independent Conservative	Death	No
Assiniboia East	September 12, 1888	William Dell Perley	Conservative	Edgar Dewdney	Conservative	Called to the Senate	Yes
Halton	August 22, 1888	John Waldie	Conservative	David Henderson	Conservative	Election declared void.	No
Lanark South	August 15, 1888	John Graham Haggart	Liberal	John Graham Haggart	Conservative	Recontested upon appointment as Postmaster-General.	Yes
Colchester	August 15, 1888	Archibald McLelan	Conservative	Adams George Archibald	Liberal-Conservative	Appointed Lieutenant-Governor of Nova Scotia.	Yes
Nicolet	July 17, 1888	Athanase Gaudet	Nationalist Conservative	Fabien Boisvert	Independent Conservative	Death	No
Cumberland	July 13, 1888	Charles Tupper	Conservative	Arthur Rupert Dickey	Conservative	Appointed Canadian High Commissioner to the United Kingdom.	Yes
Pictou	June 18, 1888	Charles Hibbert Tupper	Conservative	Charles Hibbert Tupper	Conservative	Recontested upon appointment as Minister of Marine and Fisheries.	Yes
Russell	May 7, 1888	William C. Edwards	Liberal	William C. Edwards	Liberal	Election declared void.	Yes
Kent	May 2, 1888	Archibald Campbell	Liberal	Archibald Campbell	Liberal	Election declared void.	Yes
L'Assomption	April 3, 1888	Joseph Gauthier	Liberal	Joseph Gauthier	Liberal	Election declared void.	Yes
Missisquoi	March 27, 1888	George Clayes	Liberal	Daniel Bishop Meigs	Liberal	Death	Yes
Prince Edward	March 19, 1888	John Milton Platt	Liberal	John Milton Platt	Liberal	Election declared void.	Yes
Hastings West	March 17, 1888	Alexander Robertson	Conservative	Henry Corby, Jr.	Conservative	Death	Yes
Middlesex West	March 10, 1888	William Frederick Roome	Conservative	William Frederick Roome	Conservative	Election declared void.	Yes
Halton	February 7, 1888	John Waldie	Liberal	David Henderson	Conservative	Election declared void.	No
Carleton	February 1, 1888	John A. Macdonald	Liberal-Conservative	George Lemuel Dickinson	Conservative	Chose to sit for Kingston.	Yes
Victoria	January 23, 1888	Noah Shakespeare	Conservative	Edward Gawler Prior	Conservative	Appointed Postmaster of Victoria.	Yes
Queen's	January 18, 1888	George Gerald King	Liberal	George Frederick Baird	Conservative	Election declared void.	No
Dorchester	January 7, 1888	Henri Jules Juchereau Duchesnay	Nationalist Conservative	Honoré-Julien-Jean-Baptiste Chouinard	Conservative	Death	No
Northumberland East	December 22, 1887	Albert Mallory	Liberal	Edward Cochrane	Conservative	Election declared void.	No
Shelburne	December 15, 1887	Thomas Robertson	Liberal	John Wimburne Laurie	Conservative	Election declared void.	No
Yarmouth	December 15, 1887	John Lovitt	Liberal	John Lovitt	Liberal	Election declared void.	Yes
Victoria	November 21, 1887	Charles James Campbell	Conservative	John Archibald McDonald	Liberal	Election declared void.	No
Haldimand	November 12, 1887	Walter Humphries Montague	Conservative	Walter Humphries Montague	Conservative	Election declared void.	Yes
Cumberland	November 9, 1887	Charles Tupper	Conservative	Charles Tupper	Conservative	Election declared void.	Yes
Colchester	October 27, 1887	Archibald McLelan	Conservative	Archibald McLelan	Conservative	Election declared void.	Yes
Bruce West	October 19, 1887	Edward Blake	Liberal	James Rowand	Liberal	Chose to sit for Durham West.	Yes
Richelieu	October 18, 1887	Jean-Baptiste Labelle	Conservative	Joseph-Aimé Massue	Conservative	Death	Yes
Charlevoix	September 28, 1887	Simon-Xavier Cimon	Conservative	Simon Cimon	Conservative	Death	Yes
Renfrew South	August 2, 1887	Robert Campbell	Liberal	John Ferguson	Independent	Death	No
Digby	July 16, 1887	John Campbell	Conservative	Herbert Ladd Jones	Conservative	Death	Yes
Restigouche	May 21, 1887	Robert Moffat	Conservative	George Moffat Jr.	Conservative	Death	Yes
Victoria South	April 20, 1887	Adam Hudspeth	Conservative	Adam Hudspeth	Liberal-Conservative	Seeks re-election due to holding the office of revising officer.	Yes
Bruce East	April 2, 1887	Henry Cargill	Conservative	Henry Cargill	Conservative	Seeks re-election due to holding the position of postmaster.	Yes

== 5th Parliament (1883–1887) ==
By-election	Date	Incumbent	Party	Winner	Party	Cause	Retained
Haldimand	September 8, 1886	David Thompson	Liberal	Charles Wesley Colter	Liberal	Death	Yes
Chambly	July 30, 1886	Pierre Basile Benoit	Conservative	Raymond Préfontaine	Liberal	Appointed Superintendent of the Chambly Canal.	No
King's	December 31, 1885	George Eulas Foster	Conservative	George Eulas Foster	Conservative	Recontested upon appointment as Minister of Marine and Fisheries.	Yes
City of St. John	November 24, 1885	Samuel Leonard Tilley	Liberal-Conservative	Frederick Eustace Barker	Conservative	Appointed Lieutenant-Governor of New Brunswick.	Yes
City and County of St. John	October 20, 1885	Isaac Burpee	Liberal	Charles Arthur Everett	Conservative	Death	No
Antigonish	October 16, 1885	Angus McIsaac	Liberal	John Sparrow David Thompson	Liberal-Conservative	Appointed County Court Judge for District No. 6.	No
Cardwell	August 27, 1885	Thomas White	Conservative	Thomas White	Conservative	Recontested upon appointment as Minister of the Interior.	Yes
Durham East	August 24, 1885	Arthur Trefusis Heneage Williams	Conservative	Henry Alfred Ward	Conservative	Death	Yes
Grenville South	July 4, 1885	William Thomas Benson	Conservative	Walter Shanly	Conservative	Death	Yes
Lévis	April 14, 1885	Isidore-Noël Belleau	Conservative	Pierre Malcom Guay	Liberal	Unseated on a judgement of the Supreme Court.	Yes
Northumberland West	April 7, 1885	George Guillet	Conservative	George Guillet	Conservative	Election declared void	Yes
Soulanges	February 5, 1885	James William Bain	Conservative	James William Bain	Conservative	Election declared void.	Yes
Lennox	January 28, 1885	David Wright Allison	Liberal	Matthew William Pruyn	Conservative	Election declared void.	No
Maskinongé	December 22, 1884	Frédéric Houde	Nationalist Conservative	Alexis Lesieur Desaulniers	Conservative	Death.	No
Beauce	October 31, 1884	Joseph Bolduc	Nationalist Conservative	Thomas Linière Taschereau	Conservative	Called to the Senate.	Yes
Ontario West	August 22, 1884	George Wheler	Liberal	James David Edgar	Liberal	Resignation	Yes
Queen's County	August 19, 1884	Frederick de Sainte-Croix Brecken	Conservative	John Theophilus Jenkins	Liberal-Conservative	Appointed Postmaster of Charlottetown.	Yes
Cape Breton	July 3, 1884	William McDonald	Conservative	Hector Francis McDougall	Liberal-Conservative	Called to the Senate.	Yes
York	June 29, 1884	John Pickard	Independent Liberal	Thomas Temple	Conservative	Death	No
Cumberland	June 26, 1884	Charles Tupper	Conservative	Charles James Townshend	Liberal-Conservative	Appointed High Commissioner for Canada in the United Kingdom.	Yes
Mégantic	June 10, 1884	Louis-Israël Côté dit Fréchette	Conservative	François Langelier	Liberal	Election declared void.	No
Nicolet	April 16, 1884	François-Xavier-Ovide Méthot	Independent Conservative	Athanase Gaudet	Nationalist Conservative	Appointed to the Legislative Council of Quebec.	No
Bothwell	February 25, 1884	John Joseph Hawkins	Liberal-Conservative	David Mills	Liberal	Election declared void.	No
Kent	January 29, 1884	Henry Smyth	Conservative	Henry Smyth	Conservative	Election declared void.	Yes
Soulanges	December 27, 1883	Georges-Raoul-Léotale-Guichart-Humbert Saveuse de Beaujeu	Conservative	James William Bain	Conservative	Election declared void.	Yes
Middlesex West	December 14, 1883	George William Ross	Liberal	Donald Mackenzie Cameron	Liberal	Election declared void.	Yes
Huron South	December 10, 1883	John McMillan	Liberal	Richard John Cartwright	Liberal	Resignation to provide a seat for Cartwright.	Yes
Lennox	November 26, 1883	John A. Macdonald	Liberal-Conservative	David Wright Allison	Liberal	Election voided. Macdonald was concurrently elected in Carleton and chose to sit for that riding.	No
Lévis	October 25, 1883	Joseph-Godéric Blanchet	Liberal-Conservative	Isidore-Noël Belleau	Conservative	Appointed Collector of Customs for the Port of Quebec.	Yes
Lunenburg	October 10, 1883	Thomas Twining Keefler	Liberal	Charles Edwin Kaulbach	Conservative	Election declared void.	No
Kent	September 22, 1883	Gilbert Anselme Girouard	Conservative	Pierre-Amand Landry	Conservative	Appointed customs collector for Richibucto.	Yes
Halifax	July 24, 1883	Matthew Henry Richey	Liberal-Conservative	John Fitzwilliam Stairs	Conservative	Appointed Lieutenant Governor of Nova Scotia.	Yes
Albert	July 10, 1883	John Wallace	Liberal	John Wallace	Liberal-Conservative	Election declared void.	No
King's County	April 26, 1883	James Edwin Robertson	Liberal	Augustine Colin Macdonald	Liberal-Conservative	Robertson disqualified as he was a member of the Prince Edward Island Legislative Assembly at the time of the election. The seat was adjudicated to MacDonald.	No
Queen's County	February 27, 1883	John Theophilus Jenkins	Liberal-Conservative	Frederick de Sainte-Croix Brecken	Conservative	Jenkins' election being declared void, the seat was adjudicated to Mr. Brecken.	Yes
Joliette	December 7, 1882	Édouard Guilbault	Conservative	Édouard Guilbault	Independent Conservative	Election declared void.	No
King's	November 7, 1882	George Eulas Foster	Conservative	George Eulas Foster	Conservative	Election declared void.	Yes
Soulanges	October 27, 1882	Jacques Philippe Lantier	Conservative	Georges-Raoul-Léotale-Guichart-Humbert Saveuse de Beaujeu	Conservative	Death	Yes
Bagot	September 2, 1882	Joseph-Alfred Mousseau	Conservative	Flavien Dupont	Conservative	Resignation upon appointment as Premier of Quebec.	Yes
Terrebonne	August 16, 1882	Guillaume-Alphonse Nantel	Conservative	Joseph-Adolphe Chapleau	Conservative	Resignation to provide a seat for Chapleau.	Yes

== 4th Parliament (1879–1882) ==
By-election	Date	Incumbent	Party	Winner	Party	Cause	Retained
New Westminster	March 9, 1882	Thomas Robert McInnes	Independent	Joshua Homer	Liberal-Conservative	Called to the Senate.	No
Simcoe South	February 16, 1882	William Carruthers Little	Liberal-Conservative	Angus McIsaac	Conservative	Death	Yes
Northumberland West	December 19, 1881	James Cockburn	Conservative	George Guillet	Conservative	Appointed Chairman of the Commission to collect, examine and classify the Statutes passed by the Parliament of the Dominion of Canada, since Confederation	Yes
Argenteuil	August 17, 1881	John Joseph Caldwell Abbott	Liberal-Conservative	John Joseph Caldwell Abbott	Liberal-Conservative	Election declared void.	Yes
Pictor	June 18, 1881	James McDonald	Conservative	John McDougald	Liberal-Conservative	Appointed Chief Justice of the Supreme Court of Nova Scotia.	Yes
Colchester	June 18, 1881	Thomas McKay	Liberal-Conservative	Archibald McLelan	Conservative	Called to the Senate.	Yes
Colchester	March 31, 1881	Joshua Spencer Thompson	Liberal-Conservative	James Reid	Liberal-Conservative	Death	Yes
Northumberland East	March 25, 1881	Joseph Keeler	Liberal-Conservative	Darius Crouter	Independent Liberal	Death	No
Bellechasse	March 19, 1881	Achille Larue	Liberal	Guillaume Amyot	Conservative	Election declared void.	No
Charlevoix	March 19, 1881	Joseph-Stanislas Perrault	Conservative	Simon-Xavier Cimon	Conservative	Election declared void.	Yes
Carleton	February 16, 1881	George Heber Connell	Independent	David Irvine	Liberal	Death	No
Joliette	December 9, 1880	Louis François Georges Baby	Conservative	Lewis Arthur McConville	Conservative	Appointed a judge of the Superior Court of Quebec	Yes
Oxford North	December 9, 1880	Thomas Oliver	Liberal	James Sutherland	Liberal	Death	Yes
Montmorency	December 9, 1880	Auguste-Réal Angers	Conservative	Pierre-Vincent Valin	Conservative	Appointed a judge of the Superior Court of Quebec.	Yes
Quebec County	November 20, 1880	Adolphe-Philippe Caron	Conservative	Adolphe-Philippe Caron	Conservative	Recontested upon appointment as Minister of Militia and Defence.	Yes
Bagot	November 20, 1880	Joseph-Alfred Mousseau	Conservative	Joseph-Alfred Mousseau	Conservative	Recontested upon appointment as President of the Privy Council.	Yes
Brome	October 18, 1880	Edmund Leavens Chandler	Liberal	David Ames Manson	Liberal-Conservative	Death	No
Selkirk	September 10, 1880	Donald Smith	Independent Conservative	Thomas Scott	Conservative	Election declared void.	No
Ontario North	August 28, 1880	George Wheler	Liberal	George Wheler	Liberal	Election declared void.	Yes
West Toronto	August 28, 1880	John Beverly Robinson	Conservative	James Beaty, Jr.	Conservative	Appointed Lieutenant-Governor of Ontario.	Yes
Châteauguay	April 17, 1880	Luther Hamilton Holton	Liberal	Edward Holton	Liberal	Death	Yes
Montmorency	February 14, 1880	Pierre-Vincent Valin	Conservative	Auguste-Réal Angers	Conservative	Election declared void.	Yes
Argenteuil	February 12, 1880	Thomas Christie	Liberal	John Joseph Caldwell Abbott	Liberal-Conservative	Election declared void.	No
Cornwall	January 27, 1880	Darby Bergin	Liberal-Conservative	Darby Bergin	Liberal-Conservative	Election declared void.	Yes
Lanark North	January 22, 1880	Daniel Galbraith	Liberal	Donald Greenfield MacDonell	Liberal	Death	Yes
Provencher	December 30, 1879	Joseph Dubuc	Conservative	Joseph Royal	Conservative	Appointed a Judge of the Court of Queen's Bench for Manitoba.	Yes
Durham West	November 17, 1879	Harvey William Burk	Liberal	Edward Blake	Liberal	Resignation to provide a seat for Blake.	Yes
Cape Breton	October 23, 1879	Hugh McLeod	Liberal-Conservative	William Mackenzie McLeod	Liberal-Conservative	Death	Yes
Yale	September 29, 1879	Edgar Dewdney	Conservative	Francis Jones Barnard	Conservative	Appointed Indian Commissioner of Manitoba and the North West Territories.	Yes
Bonaventure	August 26, 1879	Théodore Robitaille	Conservative	Pierre-Clovis Beauchesne	Conservative	Appointed Lieutenant Governor of Quebec.	Yes
Yamaska	July 7, 1879	Charles-Ignace Gill	Conservative	Fabien Vanasse dit Vertefeuille	Conservative	Appointed a judge to the Quebec Superior Court.	Yes
Niagara	March 20, 1879	Patrick Hughes	Liberal	Josiah Burr Plumb	Conservative	Election declared void.	No
Hastings East	February 25, 1879	John White	Conservative	John White	Conservative	Election declared void.	Yes
Charlevoix	February 13, 1879	Pierre-Alexis Tremblay	Liberal	Joseph-Stanislas Perrault	Conservative	Death	No
Beauharnois	January 9, 1879	Michael Cayley	Conservative	Joseph Gédéon H. Bergeron	Conservative	Death	Yes
Marquette	November 30, 1878	John A. Macdonald	Liberal-Conservative	Joseph O'Connell Ryan	Liberal	MacDonald was elected in several seats simultaneously, resigned to run in Ministerial by-election in Victoria.	No
Three Rivers	November 21, 1878	William McDougall	Conservative	Hector-Louis Langevin	Conservative	Resignation to provide a seat for Langevin.	Yes
Joliette	November 14, 1878	Louis François Georges Baby	Conservative	Louis François Georges Baby	Conservative	Recontested upon appointment as Minister of Inland Revenue.	Yes
Queens County	November 9, 1878	James Colledge Pope	Conservative	James Colledge Pope	Conservative	Recontested upon appointment as Minister of Marine and Fisheries.	Yes
Hastings North	November 6, 1878	Mackenzie Bowell	Conservative	Mackenzie Bowell	Conservative	Recontested upon appointment as Minister of Customs.	Yes
Terrebonne	November 6, 1878	Louis-Rodrigue Masson	Conservative	Louis-Rodrigue Masson	Conservative	Recontested upon appointment as Minister of Militia and Defence.	Yes
City of St. John	November 4, 1878	Samuel Leonard Tilley	Liberal-Conservative	Samuel Leonard Tilley	Liberal-Conservative	Recontested upon appointment as Minister of Finance.	Yes
Pictou	November 4, 1878	James McDonald	Conservative	James McDonald	Conservative	Recontested upon appointment as Minister of Justice and Attorney General.	Yes
Russell	November 4, 1878	John O'Connor	Conservative	John O'Connor	Conservative	Recontested upon appointment as President of the Privy Council.	Yes
Compton	November 4, 1878	John Henry Pope	Liberal-Conservative	John Henry Pope	Liberal-Conservative	Recontested upon appointment as Minister of Agriculture.	Yes
Cumberland	November 4, 1878	Charles Tupper	Conservative	Charles Tupper	Conservative	Recontested upon appointment as Minister of Public Works.	Yes
Huron Centre	November 2, 1878	Horace Horton	Liberal	Richard John Cartwright	Liberal	Appointment in the office of the Auditor-General of Canada.	Yes

== 3rd Parliament (1874–1878) ==
By-election	Date	Incumbent	Party	Winner	Party	Cause	Retained
New Westminster	March 25, 1878	James Cunningham	Liberal	Thomas Robert McInnes	Independent	Resignation	No
Northumberland	February 5, 1878	Peter Mitchell	Independent	Peter Mitchell	Independent	Resignation to re-contest after being accused of violating the Independence of Parliament Act by leasing a building to the government while he was a senator.	Yes
Halifax	January 29, 1878	Alfred Gilpin Jones	Independent	Alfred Gilpin Jones	Independent	Resignation to re-contest because of an alleged breach of the Independence of Parliament Act.	Yes
Digby	January 19, 1878	William Berrian Vail	Liberal	John Chipman Wade	Conservative	Resignation to re-contest due to conflict of interest allegations.	No
Restigouche	January 12, 1878	George Moffat Sr.	Conservative	George Haddow	Independent	Resignation	No
Nicolet	December 18, 1877	Joseph Gaudet	Conservative	François-Xavier-Ovide Méthot	Independent Conservative	Appointed to the Legislative Council of Quebec	No
Quebec East	November 28, 1877	Isidore Thibaudeau	Liberal	Wilfrid Laurier	Liberal	Resignation to provide a seat for Laurier.	Yes
Quebec-Centre	November 3, 1877	Joseph-Édouard Cauchon	Conservative	Jacques Malouin	Independent	Appointed Lieutenant-Governor of Manitoba.	No
Drummond—Arthabaska	October 27, 1877	Wilfrid Laurier	Liberal	Désiré Olivier Bourbeau	Conservative	Recontested upon appointment as Minister of Inland Revenue.	No
Gloucester	July 2, 1877	Timothy Anglin	Liberal	Timothy Anglin	Liberal	Resignation to re-contest after being found in violation of the Independence of Parliament Act for accepting government printing contracts, and being censured by the House of Commons Committee on Privilege.	Yes
Ottawa (City of)	May 9, 1877	Joseph Merrill Currier	Liberal-Conservative	Joseph Merrill Currier	Liberal-Conservative	Resignation to re-contest for having infringed the Independence of Parliament Act by conducting business dealings with the government while still a member.	Yes
Lincoln	May 9, 1877	James Norris	Liberal	James Norris	Liberal	Resigns in order to re-contest after acquiring a government contract.	Yes
Charlevoix	March 23, 1877	Hector-Louis Langevin	Conservative	Hector-Louis Langevin	Conservative	Election declared void.	Yes
Kamouraska	February 19, 1877	Charles Alphonse Pantaléon Pelletier	Liberal	Charles-François Roy	Conservative	Called to the Senate.	No
Jacques Cartier	December 28, 1876	Rodolphe Laflamme	Liberal	Rodolphe Laflamme	Liberal	Recontested upon appointment as Minister of Inland Revenue.	Yes
Cardwell	December 14, 1876	John Hillyard Cameron	Conservative	Dalton McCarthy	Conservative	Death	Yes
Queen's County	November 22, 1876	David Laird	Liberal	James Colledge Pope	Conservative	Appointed Lieutenant-Governor of the North West Territories.	No
Bothwell	November 15, 1876	David Mills	Liberal	David Mills	Liberal	Recontested upon appointment as Minister of the Interior and Superintendent General of Indian Affairs.	Yes
Beauce	October 18, 1876	Christian Henry Pozer	Liberal	Joseph Bolduc	Conservative	Called to the Senate.	No
Victoria	September 21, 1876	Barclay Edmund Tremaine	Liberal	Charles James Campbell	Conservative	Appointed a County Court judge.	No
Glengarry	July 31, 1876	Archibald McNab	Liberal	Archibald McNab	Liberal	Election declared void.	Yes
Ontario South	July 5, 1876	Malcolm Cameron	Liberal	Thomas Nicholson Gibbs	Liberal-Conservative	Death	No
Ontario North	July 5, 1876	Adam Gordon	Liberal	William Henry Gibbs	Conservative	Death	No
Wellington South	July 5, 1876	David Stirton	Liberal	Donald Guthrie	Liberal	Appointed Postmaster of Guelph.	Yes
Middlesex North	June 7, 1876	Thomas Scatcherd	Liberal	Robert Colin Scatcherd	Liberal	Death	Yes.
Two Mountains	March 11, 1876	Charles Auguste Maximilien Globensky	Independent	Jean-Baptiste Daoust	Conservative	Resignation	No
Charlevoix	January 22, 1876	Pierre-Alexis Tremblay	Liberal	Hector-Louis Langevin	Conservative	Election declared void.	No
Renfrew North	January 21, 1876	William Murray	Liberal	Peter White	Conservative	Election declared void.	No
Chambly	January 7, 1876	Amable Jodoin	Liberal	Pierre Basile Benoit	Conservative	Election declared void.	No
Argenteuil	December 31, 1875	Lemuel Cushing, Jr.	Liberal	Thomas Christie	Liberal	Election declared void.	Yes
Quebec-Centre	December 27, 1875	Joseph-Édouard Cauchon	Conservative	Joseph-Édouard Cauchon	Conservative	Recontested upon appointment as President of the Privy Council.	Yes
Dorchester	December 14, 1875	François Fortunat Rouleau	Liberal-Conservative	François Fortunat Rouleau	Liberal-Conservative	Election declared void.	Yes
Montreal Centre	November 26, 1875	Bernard Devlin	Liberal	Bernard Devlin	Liberal	Election declared void.	Yes
Bellechasse	November 23, 1875	Télesphore Fournier	Liberal	Joseph Goderic Blanchet	Conservative	Appointed to the Supreme Court of Canada.	No
West Toronto	November 6, 1875	Thomas Moss	Liberal	John Beverly Robinson	Conservative	Appointed to the Court of Appeal of Ontario	No
Montreal West	October 30, 1875	Frederick Mackenzie	Liberal	Thomas Workman	Liberal	Election declared void.	Yes
Victoria North	September 17, 1875	James Maclennan	Liberal	Hector Cameron	Conservative	Court overturns result of 1874 by-election and declared Cameron seated.	No
Gaspé	July 10, 1875	Louis George Harper	Conservative	John Short	Conservative	Election declared void.	Yes
Glengarry	July 7, 1875	Donald Alexander Macdonald	Liberal	Archibald McNab	Liberal	Appointed Lieutenant-Governor of Ontario.	Yes
Perth North	July 7, 1875	Andrew Monteith	Conservative	Andrew Monteith	Conservative	Election declared void.	Yes
York North	June 29, 1875	Alfred Hutchinson Dymond	Liberal	Alfred Hutchinson Dymond	Liberal	Election declared void.	Yes
Monck	June 22, 1875	Lachlin McCallum	Liberal-Conservative	Lachlin McCallum	Liberal-Conservative	Election declared void.	Yes
Napierville	June 19, 1875	Sixte Coupal dit la Reine	Liberal	Sixte Coupal dit la Reine	Liberal	Election declared void.	Yes
Bruce South	June 2, 1875	Edward Blake	Liberal	Edward Blake	Liberal	Recontested upon appointment as Minister of Justice.	Yes
Toronto Centre	May 21, 1875	Robert Wilkes	Liberal	John Macdonald	Liberal	Election declared void.	Yes
Hamilton	May 20, 1875	Andrew Trew Wood and Aemilius Irving	Liberal	Aemilius Irving and Andrew Trew Wood	Liberal	Double member constituency - elections declared void.	Yes
Victoria	April 28, 1875	Charles James Campbell	Conservative	Barclay Edmund Tremaine	Liberal	Campbell unseated by decision of the Supreme Court of Nova Scotia., 28 February 1875; Tremaine declared duly elected by decision of Election Court, 28 April 1875	No
Provencher	March 31, 1875	Louis Riel	Independent	Andrew Bannatyne	Liberal	Unseated from the House of Commons and declared an outlaw, 25 February 1875	No
Wellington North	March 18, 1875	Nathaniel Higinbotham	Liberal	Nathaniel Higinbotham	Liberal	Election declared void.	Yes
Berthier	February 27, 1875	Anselme-Homère Pâquet	Liberal	Edward Octavian Cuthbert	Conservative	Called to the Senate.	No
Two Mountains	February 26, 1875	Wilfrid Prévost	Liberal	Charles Auguste Maximilien Globensky	Independent	Election declared void	No
Renfrew South	February 20, 1875	John Lorn McDougall	Liberal	John Lorn McDougall	Liberal	Election declared void.	Yes
London	February 18, 1875	John Walker	Liberal	James Harshaw Fraser	Liberal-Conservative	Election declared void	No
Huron South	February 11, 1875	Malcolm Colin Cameron	Liberal	Thomas Greenway	Independent	Election declared void.	No
Middlesex East	January 28, 1875	Crowell Willson	Liberal-Conservative	Duncan Macmillan	Liberal-Conservative	Election declared void.	Yes
Halton	January 25, 1875	Daniel Black Chisholm	Liberal-Conservative	William McCraney	Liberal	Election declared void.	No
Toronto East	January 18, 1875	John O'Donohoe	Liberal-Conservative	Samuel Platt	Independent	Election declared void.	No
L'Assomption	January 16, 1875	Hilaire Hurteau	Liberal-Conservative	Hilaire Hurteau	Liberal-Conservative	Election declared void.	Yes
Montreal Centre	January 12, 1875	Michael Patrick Ryan	Liberal-Conservative	Bernard Devlin	Liberal	Election declared void.	No
Chambly	December 30, 1874	Pierre Basile Benoit	Conservative	Amable Jodoin	Liberal	Election declared void.	No
Kingston	December 29, 1874	John A. Macdonald	Liberal-Conservative	John A. Macdonald	Liberal-Conservative	Election declared void.	Yes
Simcoe North	December 26, 1874	Herman Henry Cook	Liberal	Herman Henry Cook	Liberal	Election declared void.	Yes
Victoria North	December 22, 1874	James Maclennan	Liberal	James Maclennan	Liberal	Election declared void.	Yes
Niagara	December 22, 1874	Josiah Burr Plumb	Conservative	Josiah Burr Plumb	Conservative	Election declared void.	Yes
Victoria	December 17, 1874	William Ross	Liberal	Charles James Campbell	Conservative	Appointed to Collector of Customs at Halifax.	No
Colchester	December 17, 1874	Thomas McKay	Liberal-Conservative	Thomas McKay	Liberal-Conservative	Election declared void.	Yes
Leeds North and Grenville North	December 16, 1874	Charles Frederick Ferguson	Liberal-Conservative	Charles Frederick Ferguson	Liberal-Conservative	Election declared void.	Yes
Norfolk South	December 16, 1874	John Stuart	Liberal	William Wallace	Conservative	Election declared void.	No
Wellington Centre	December 13, 1874	George Turner Orton	Liberal-Conservative	George Turner Orton	Liberal-Conservative	Election declared void.	Yes
Northumberland East	December 12, 1874	James Lyons Biggar	Independent Liberal	James Lyons Biggar	Independent Liberal	Election declared void.	Yes
Joliette	December 10, 1874	Louis François Georges Baby	Conservative	Louis François Georges Baby	Conservative	Election declared void.	Yes
Montreal West	December 10, 1874	Frederick Mackenzie	Liberal	Frederick Mackenzie	Liberal	Election declared void.	Yes
Richmond—Wolfe	December 4, 1874	Henry Aylmer	Liberal	Henry Aylmer	Liberal	Election declared void.	Yes
Northumberland West	November 17, 1874	William Kerr	Liberal	William Kerr	Liberal	Election declared void.	Yes
Lincoln	November 17, 1874	James Norris	Liberal	James Norris	Liberal	Election declared void.	Yes
Argenteuil	November 4, 1874	John Abbott	Liberal-Conservative	Lemuel Cushing, Jr.	Liberal	Election declared void.	No
Renfrew North	November 4, 1874	Peter White	Conservative	William Murray	Liberal	Election declared void.	No
Addington	October 28, 1874	Schuyler Shibley	Conservative	Schuyler Shibley	Liberal-Conservative	Election declared void.	Yes
Digby	October 26, 1874	Edwin Randolph Oakes	Liberal-Conservative	William Berrian Vail	Liberal	Appointed to the Legislative Council of Nova Scotia.	No
Renfrew South	October 24, 1874	John Lorn McDougall	Liberal	John Lorn McDougall	Liberal	Election declared void.	Yes
Essex	October 22, 1874	William McGregor	Liberal	William McGregor	Liberal	Election declared void.	Yes
Cornwall	October 20, 1874	Alexander Francis Macdonald	Liberal	Alexander Francis Macdonald	Liberal	Election declared void.	Yes
Provencher	September 3, 1874	Louis Riel	Independent	Louis Riel	Independent	Expelled from the House of Commons	Yes
Marquette	August 25, 1874	Robert Cunningham	Liberal	Joseph O'Connell Ryan	Liberal	Death, Ryan awarded seat upon re-examination of votes cast.	Yes
Elgin East	August 11, 1874	William Harvey	Liberal	Colin MacDougall	Liberal	Death	Yes
Napierville	August 4, 1874	Antoine-Aimé Dorion	Liberal	Sixte Coupal dit la Reine	Liberal	Appointed Chief Justice of Quebec.	Yes
Verchères	July 25, 1874	Félix Geoffrion	Liberal	Félix Geoffrion	Liberal	Recontested upon appointment as Minister of Inland Revenue.	Yes
Oxford South	May 23, 1874	Ebenezer Vining Bodwell	Liberal	James Atchison Skinner	Liberal	Appointed Superintendent of the Welland Canal.	Yes
Durham West	April 7, 1874	Edmund B. Wood	Liberal	Harvey William Burk	Liberal	Appointed Chief Justice of Manitoba.	Yes

== 2nd Parliament (1873–1874) ==
By-election	Date	Incumbent	Party	Winner	Party	Cause	Retained
Victoria	December 20, 1873	William Ross	Liberal	William Ross	Liberal	Recontested upon appointment as Minister of Militia	Yes
Antigonish	December 20, 1873	Hugh McDonald	Liberal-Conservative	Angus McIsaac	Liberal	Appointed a Judge of the Supreme Court of Nova Scotia	No
West Toronto	December 18, 1873	John Willoughby Crawford	Conservative	Thomas Moss	Liberal	Incumbent's death	No
Bruce South	December 14, 1873	Edward Blake	Liberal	Edward Blake	Liberal	Recontested upon appointment as Minister without portfolio	Yes
Shelburne	December 9, 1873	Thomas Coffin	Liberal-Conservative	Thomas Coffin	Liberal	Recontested upon appointment as Receiver-General of Canada	No
Lennox	December 3, 1873	Richard John Cartwright	Liberal	Richard John Cartwright	Liberal	Recontested upon appointment as Minister of Finance	Yes
Queen's County	December 3, 1873	David Laird	Liberal	David Laird	Liberal	Recontested upon appointment as Minister of the Interior	Yes
City of St. John	December 1, 1873	Samuel Leonard Tilley	Liberal-Conservative	Jeremiah Smith Boies De Veber	Liberal	Appointed Lieutenant-Governor of New Brunswick	No
City and County of St. John	December 1, 1873	Isaac Burpee	Liberal	Isaac Burpee	Liberal	Recontested upon appointment as Minister of Customs	Yes
Westmorland	November 28, 1873	Albert James Smith	Liberal	Albert James Smith	Liberal	Recontested upon appointment as Minister of Marine and Fisheries	Yes
Bellechasse	November 27, 1873	Télesphore Fournier	Liberal	Télesphore Fournier	Liberal	Recontested upon appointment as Minister of Inland Revenue	Yes
Napierville	November 27, 1873	Antoine-Aimé Dorion	Liberal	Antoine-Aimé Dorion	Liberal	Recontested upon appointment as Minister of Justice	Yes
Glengarry	November 26, 1873	Donald Alexander Macdonald	Liberal	Donald Alexander Macdonald	Liberal	Recontested upon appointment as Postmaster-General	Yes
Lambton	November 25, 1873	Alexander Mackenzie	Liberal	Alexander Mackenzie	Liberal	Recontested upon appointment as Prime Minister and Minister of Public Works	Yes
Laval	October 28, 1873	Joseph-Hyacinthe Bellerose	Conservative	Joseph-Aldric Ouimet	Liberal-Conservative	Called to the Senate	Yes
Provencher	October 13, 1873	George-Étienne Cartier	Liberal-Conservative	Louis Riel	Independent	Incumbent's death	No
Prince County	September 29, 1873	New seat		James Colledge Pope and James Yeo	Conservative and Liberal	Held as a result of Prince Edward Island joining Confederation. Elected 2 MPs.	NA
Queen's County	September 29, 1873	New seat		David Laird and Peter Sinclair	Liberal	Held as a result of Prince Edward Island joining Confederation. Elected 2 MPs.	NA
King's County	September 29, 1873	New Seat		Daniel Davies and Augustine Colin Macdonald	Conservative and Liberal-Conservative	Held as a result of Prince Edward Island joining Confederation. Elected 2 MPs.	NA
Carleton	September 18, 1873	Charles Connell	Liberal	Stephen Burpee Appleby	Liberal	Incumbent's death	Yes
Antigonish	July 7, 1873	Hugh McDonald	Liberal-Conservative	Hugh McDonald	Liberal-Conservative	Recontested upon appointment as President of the Privy Council	Yes
Ontario South	July 7, 1873	Thomas Nicholson Gibbs	Liberal-Conservative	Thomas Nicholson Gibbs	Liberal-Conservative	Recontested upon appointment as Secretary of State for the Provinces and Superintendent General of Indian Affairs	Yes
Hants	July 5, 1873	Joseph Howe	Liberal-Conservative	Monson Henry Goudge	Liberal	Appointed Lieutenant Governor of Nova Scotia.	No
Durham West	April 10, 1873	Edward Blake	Liberal	Edmund Burke Wood	Liberal	Chose to sit for Bruce South.	Yes
Quebec County	March 28, 1873	Pierre-Joseph-Olivier Chauveau	Conservative	Adolphe-Philippe Caron	Conservative	Called to the Senate	Yes
Bonaventure	February 15, 1873	Théodore Robitaille	Conservative	Théodore Robitaille	Conservative	Recontested upon appointment as Receiver-General	Yes
Welland	November 23, 1872	Thomas Clark Street	Conservative	William Alexander Thomson	Liberal	Incumbent's death	No

== New Brunswick ==
Date	Riding	Incumbent	Party	Elected	Party	Reason for by-election
March 13, 1868	Restigouche	John McMillan	Liberal	William Murray Caldwell	Liberal	McMillan appointed Inspector of Post Offices in New Brunswick, February 15, 1868
October 28, 1868	York	Charles Fisher	Liberal	John Pickard	Independent Liberal	Fisher appointed to New Brunswick Supreme Court, October 3, 1868
December 24, 1868	Northumberland	John Mercer Johnson	Liberal	Richard Hutchison	Liberal	Johnson's death, November 8, 1868
November 29, 1870	Restigouche	William Murray Caldwell	Liberal	George Moffat, Sr.	Conservative	Caldwell appointed inspector of post offices in New Brunswick, September 29, 1870

=== Nova Scotia ===
Date	Riding	Incumbent	Party	Elected	Party	Reason for by-election
April 20, 1869	Richmond	William Joseph Croke	Anti-Confederate	Isaac LeVesconte	Conservative	Croke's death, March 11, 1869
April 20, 1869	Yarmouth	Thomas Killam	Anti-Confederate	Frank Killam	Liberal	Thomas Killam's death, December 15, 1868
April 24, 1869	Hants	Joseph Howe	Anti-Confederate	Joseph Howe	Liberal-Conservative	Ministerial by-election upon Howe's appointment as President of the Privy Council, January 30, 1869
September 9, 1869	Colchester	Archibald McLelan	Anti-Confederate	Adams George Archibald	Liberal-Conservative	McLelan called to the Senate, June 21, 1869
June 15, 1870	Cumberland	Charles Tupper	Conservative	Charles Tupper	Conservative	Ministerial by-election upon Tupper's appointment as President of the Privy Council
June 23, 1870	Kings	William Henry Chipman	Anti-Confederate	Leverett de Veber Chipman	Liberal	William Chipman's death, April 10, 1870
November 8, 1870	Colchester	Adams George Archibald	Liberal-Conservative	Frederick M. Pearson	Liberal	Archibald appointed Lieutenant-Governor of Manitoba and Lieutenant Governor of the North-West Territories, May 20, 1870

== Ontario ==
Date	Riding	Incumbent	Party	Elected	Party	Reason for by-election
April 13, 1868	Lincoln	James Rea Benson	Liberal-Conservative	Thomas Rodman Merritt	Liberal	Benson called to the Senate, March 14, 1868
August 14, 1868	York West	William Pearce Howland	Liberal-Conservative	Amos Wright	Liberal	Howland appointed Lieutenant-Governor of Ontario, July 15, 1868
July 12, 1869	Wellington Centre	Thomas Sutherland Parker	Liberal	James Ross	Liberal	Parker's death, October 24, 1868
November 13, 1869	Renfrew North	John Rankin	Liberal-Conservative	Francis Hincks	Conservative	Rankin resigned to provide a seat for Hincks, October 12, 1869
November 29, 1869	Renfrew South	Daniel McLachlin	Liberal	John Lorn McDougall	Liberal	McLachlin resigned June 3, 1869, taking retirement
November 29, 1869	Lanark South	Alexander Morris	Conservative	Alexander Morris	Conservative	Ministerial by-election upon Morris's appointment as Minister of Inland Revenue, November 15, 1869
April 27, 1870	Frontenac	Thomas Kirkpatrick	Conservative	George Airey Kirkpatrick	Conservative	Kirkpatrick's death, March 26, 1870
March 20, 1871	Hastings East	Robert Read	Conservative	John White	Conservative	Read called to the Senate, February 24, 1871
June 30, 1871	Algoma	Wemyss Mackenzie Simpson	Conservative	Frederick William Cumberland	Conservative	Simpson appointed Indian Commissioner for Rupert's Land, April 26, 1871

== Quebec ==
Date	Riding	Incumbent	Party	Elected	Party	Reason for by-election
November 28, 1867	Huntingdon	Sir John Rose	Liberal-Conservative	Sir John Rose	Liberal-Conservative	Ministerial by-election upon Rose's appointment as Minister of Finance, November 18, 1867
December 11, 1867	Montmorency	Joseph-Édouard Cauchon	Conservative	Jean Langlois	Conservative	Cauchon called to the Senate, November 2, 1867
April 20, 1868	Montreal West	Thomas D'Arcy McGee	Liberal-Conservative	Michael Patrick Ryan	Liberal-Conservative	McGee assassinated, April 7, 1868
October 17, 1868	Three Rivers	Louis-Charles Boucher de Niverville	Conservative	William McDougall	Conservative	Boucher de Niverville appointed sheriff for the district of Trois-Rivières, September 30, 1868
October 30, 1868	Saint Maurice	Louis-Léon Lesieur Desaulniers	Conservative	Élie Lacerte	Conservative	Desaulniers appointed inspector of prisons and asylums in Quebec, September 29, 1868
February 17, 1869	Kamouraska	Vacant		Charles Alphonse Pantaléon Pelletier	Liberal	No election held in 1867 due to riots
July 14, 1869	L'Islet	Barthélemy Pouliot	Conservative	Barthélemy Pouliot	Conservative	Previous election annulled, June 9, 1869
October 30, 1869	Huntingdon	Sir John Rose	Liberal-Conservative	Julius Scriver	Liberal	Rose resigned September 29, 1869 and moved to London where he acted as the government's representative to the UK.
November 29, 1869	Brome	Christopher Dunkin	Conservative	Christopher Dunkin	Conservative	Ministerial by-election upon Dunkin's appointment as Minister of Agriculture, November 15, 1869
July 5, 1870	Missisquoi	Brown Chamberlin	Conservative	George Barnard Baker	Liberal-Conservative	Chamberlin resigned on appointment as Queen's Printer, June 6, 1870
July 18, 1870	Quebec East	Pierre-Gabriel Huot	Liberal	Adolphe Guillet dit Tourangeau	Conservative	Huot resigned on appointment as postmaster at Quebec, June 14, 1870
August 15, 1870	Bellechasse	Louis-Napoléon Casault	Conservative	Télesphore Fournier	Liberal	Casault resigned on appointment to the Superior Court of Quebec, May 26, 1870
September 1, 1870	St. Hyacinthe	Alexandre-Édouard Kierzkowski	Liberal	Louis Delorme	Liberal	Kierzkowski's death, August 4, 1870
November 18, 1870	Richelieu	Thomas McCarthy	Conservative	Georges Isidore Barthe	Independent Conservative	McCarthy's death, September 23, 1870
September 15, 1871	Montcalm	Joseph Dufresne	Conservative	Firmin Dugas	Conservative	Dufresne was appointed Sheriff of Saint-Jean County, July 13, 1871
November 11, 1871	Compton	John Henry Pope	Conservative	John Henry Pope	Conservative	Ministerial by-election upon appointment as Minister of Agriculture, October 25, 1871
November 17, 1871	Brome	Christopher Dunkin	Conservative	Edward Carter	Conservative	Dunkin resigned on appointment to the Superior Court of Quebec, October 24, 1871

== Sources ==
- Parliament of Canada–Elected in By-Elections

== See also ==
- List of federal general elections in Canada
