= List of portraits in the Centre Block =

The Centre Block, part of the complex of parliamentary buildings on Parliament Hill in Canada's capital, Ottawa, hosts a gallery of portraits of present and former Canadian monarchs, former Prime Ministers of Canada, and other figures.

== History ==
The collection of portraits of Canada's monarchs originated with the acquiring of a state portrait of Queen Victoria for the parliament buildings of the Province of Canada in Montreal in 1849. As successive monarchs came to the throne, their portraits were added to the gallery. However, it was not until Senator Serge Joyal took on the personal project of amassing portraits of monarchs prior to Victoria that the collection came closer to completion, including the Kings of France since Francis I.

The prime minister's portrait gallery dates back to 1890, when John A. Macdonald, the first prime minister of the Dominion of Canada, assisted in the unveiling of his own portrait. At first, the works were commissioned by friends and colleagues, made by the artist's own initiative, and then donated to the Crown Collection. A century later, a more systematic approach was implemented, and the artist is now chosen by the prime minister, although Curatorial Services provide suggerences and assistance on the choice.

The portraits are viewed by over 400,000 people a year.

== Works ==
=== Paintings of French monarchs ===
Title/subject	Artist	Date created	Medium
Francis I	After Titien	c. 1820	Oil on canvas
Louis XIII	Philippe de Champaigne	c. 1630	Oil on canvas
Louis XIV	Hyacinthe Rigaud	c. 1700	Oil on canvas
Louis XV	Charles-André van Loo	c. 1740	Oil on canvas

=== Paintings of British monarchs ===
Title/subject	Artist	Date created	Medium
George III	Joshua Reynolds	1779	Oil on canvas
George IV	Thomas Lawrence	1822	Oil on canvas
William IV	Frederick Christian Lewis	1831	Engraving
Victoria	John Partridge	1842	Oil on canvas
Edward VII	Luke Fildes	1903	Oil on canvas

=== Paintings of Canadian monarchs ===
Title/subject	Artist	Date created	Medium
George V	Luke Fildes	1913	Oil on canvas
Edward VIII	Carl Vandyk	1936	Photolithograph
George VI	Robert Swain	1955	Oil on canvas
Elizabeth II	Lilias Torrance Newton	1957	Oil on canvas

=== Paintings of prime ministers ===
Title/subject	Artist	Date created	Medium
John A. Macdonald (Note: Also a Father of Confederation)	Henry Sandham	1889	Oil on canvas
Alexander Mackenzie	John Wycliffe Lowes Forster	1897	Oil on canvas
John Abbott	Muli Tang	2002	Oil on canvas
John Sparrow David Thompson	John Wycliffe Lowes Forster	1897	Oil on canvas
Mackenzie Bowell	Joanne Tod	2002	Oil on canvas
Charles Tupper	Victor Albert Long	1896	Oil on canvas
Wilfrid Laurier	John Wentworth Russell	1919	Oil on canvas
Robert Borden	Kenneth Keith Forbes	1947	Oil on canvas
Arthur Meighen	Ernest Fosbery	1948	Oil on canvas
William Lyon Mackenzie King	Frank Owen Salisbury	1945	Oil on canvas
Richard Bedford Bennett	Kenneth Keith Forbes	1962	Oil on canvas
Louis St. Laurent	Audrey Watts McNaughton	1958	Oil on canvas
John Diefenbaker	Cleeve Horne	1968	Oil on canvas
Lester B. Pearson	Hugh Seaforth Mackenzie	1968	Tempera on masonite
Pierre Trudeau	Myfanwy Spencer Pavelic	1991	Acrylic on canvas
Joe Clark	Patrick Douglass Cox	2008	Tempera
John Turner	Brenda Bury	1999	Oil on canvas
Brian Mulroney	Igor V. Babailov	2002	Oil on canvas
Kim Campbell	David Goatley	2004	Oil on canvas
Jean Chrétien	Christian Nicholson	2010	Oil on canvas
Paul Martin	Paul Wyse	2016	Oil on canvas
Stephen Harper	Phil Richards	2026	Acrylic on canvas

=== Paintings of Speakers of the House of Assembly of the Province of Lower Canada ===
Title/subject	Artist	Date created	Medium
Jean-Antoine Panet	Copy by Théophile Hamel	1856	Oil on canvas
Michel Chartier de Lotbinière	Copy by Théophile Hamel	1854	Oil on canvas
Louis-Joseph Papineau	Alfred Boisseau	1881	Oil on canvas

=== Speakers of the House of Assembly of the Province of Upper Canada ===
Title/subject	Artist	Date created	Medium
David William Smith	Théophile Hamel	1859	Oil on canvas
Alexander Macdonell	Copy by Théophile Hamel	1854	Oil on canvas
Levius Peters Sherwood	Copy by Théophile Hamel	1855	Oil on canvas
John Willson	Théophile Hamel	1855	Oil on canvas
Marshall Spring Bidwell	Théophile Hamel	1854	Oil on canvas
Archibald McLean	Théophile Hamel	1854	Oil on canvas
Sir Allan Napier MacNab (Note: Also sat as the Speaker of the Legislative Assembly of the Province of Canada)	Théophile Hamel	1853	Oil on canvas
Henry Ruttan	Théophile Hamel	1856	Oil on canvas

=== Paintings of Speakers of the Legislative Assembly of the Province of Canada ===
Title/subject	Artist	Date created	Medium
Austin Cuvillier	Copy by Théophile Hamel	1856	Oil on canvas
Augustin-Norbert Morin	Théophile Hamel	1854	Oil on canvas
John Sandfield Macdonald	Théophile Hamel	1854	Oil on canvas
Louis-Victor Sicotte	Théophile Hamel	1855	Oil on canvas
Henry Smith	William Sawyer	1869	Oil on canvas
Joseph-Édouard Turcotte	Théophile Hamel	1865	Oil on canvas
Lewis Wallbridge	William Sawyer	1873	Oil on canvas

=== Paintings of Speakers of the House of Commons ===
Title/subject	Artist	Date created	Medium
James Cockburn	George Theodore Berthon	1872	Oil on canvas
Timothy Anglin	John Colin Forbes	1878	Oil on canvas
Joseph-Godéric Blanchet	John Colin Forbes	c. 1880	Oil on canvas
George Airey Kirkpatrick	Frances E. Richards Rowley	1887	Oil on canvas
Joseph-Aldric Ouimet	René Émile Quentin	1889	Oil on canvas
Peter White	Robert Harris	1894	Oil on canvas
James David Edgar	Alphonse Jongers	c. 1899	Oil on canvas
Thomas Bain	John Colin Forbes	c. 1900	Oil on canvas
Louis-Philippe Brodeur	Ozias Leduc	1904	Oil on canvas
Napoléon Belcourt	Charles Ignace Adélard Gill	c. 1905	Oil on canvas
Robert Franklin Sutherland	John Wycliffe Lowes Forster	c. 1906	Oil on canvas
Charles Marcil	Ulric Lamarche	1912	Oil on canvas
Thomas Simpson Sproule	John Colin Forbes	c. 1913	Oil on canvas
Albert Sévigny	Charles Huot	c. 1918	Oil on canvas
Edgar Nelson Rhodes	Sir Edmund Wyly Grier	1921	Oil on canvas
Rodolphe Lemieux	Jacqueline Comerre Paton	c. 1924	Oil on canvas
George Black	Kenneth Keith Forbes	1934	Oil on canvas
James Langstaff Bowman	Kenneth Keith Forbes	c. 1935	Oil on canvas
Pierre-François Casgrain	Kenneth Keith Forbes	c. 1940	Oil on canvas
James Allison Glen	Kenneth Keith Forbes	c. 1945	Oil on canvas
Gaspard Fauteux	Kenneth Keith Forbes	1946	Oil on canvas
William Ross Macdonald	Lilias Torrance Newton	1951	Oil on canvas
Louis-René Beaudoin	Kenneth Keith Forbes	1960	Oil on canvas
Roland Michener	Cleeve Horne	1962	Oil on canvas
Marcel Lambert	Kenneth Keith Forbes	1963	Oil on canvas
Alan Macnaughton	Lilias Torrance Newton	c. 1964	Oil on canvas
Lucien Lamoureux	Suraj Sadan	1977	Oil on canvas
James Jerome	Robert Stewart Hyndman	1979	Oil on canvas
Jeanne Sauvé	Brenda Bury	1984	Oil on canvas
Cyril Lloyd Francis	Anita Elizabeth Kertzer	1987	Oil on canvas
John Bosley	Shirley Van Dusen	1993	Oil on canvas
John Allen Fraser	Gregory Furmanczyk	1994	Oil on canvas
Gilbert Parent	David Goatley	2001	Oil on canvas
Peter Milliken	Paul Wyse	2012	Oil on canvas
Andrew Scheer	Juan Carlos Martínez	2018	Oil on canvas

=== Paintings of the Fathers of Confederation ===
Title/subject	Artist	Date created	Medium
The Fathers of Confederation	Rex Woods	1968	Oil on canvas
George-Étienne Cartier (Note: Also the former Joint-Premier of the United Provinces of Canada)	Juliette de Lavoye	c. 1965	Watercolour on ivory / Glass; velvet; walnut
Thomas D'Arcy McGee	Bruce Mitchell	1957	Oil on canvas
George Brown	Juliette de Lavoye	c. 1965	Watercolour on ivory; Glass; velvet; walnut

=== Paintings of historic events and people ===
Title/subject	Artist	Date created	Medium
The Royal Visit, 1939	Frank Owen Salisbury	1941	Oil on canvas
Opening of Parliament in the 19th Century	William Harvey Sadd	1901	Oil on canvas
Discovery of Canada by Jacques Cartier	Copy by Augustine Leriverend after Ferdinand Perrot (1840)		Oil on canvas
Major General James Wolfe	Copy by Théophile Hamel	c. 1865	Oil on canvas
Louis-Joseph de Montcalm	Copy by Théophile Hamel	c. 1865	Oil on canvas
George Prevost	Copy by Théophile Hamel after Robert Field (c. 1808)	1864	Oil on canvas
Amerigo Vespucci	Copy by Antoine Sébastien Falardeau	1857	Oil on canvas
Christopher Columbus	Copy by Antoine Sébastien Falardeau	1853	Oil on canvas

=== Sculptures ===
Title/Subject	Public Office	Artist	Date Painted/Created	Medium
George Harold Baker	Member of Parliament	Robert Tait McKenzie	1923	Bronze
Robert Borden	Prime Minister	Alfred Laliberté	1915	Marble
Robert Borden	Prime Minister	Lionel Gooch Fosbery	1927	Plaster, painted
Ellen Fairclough	First Woman Cabinet Minister	Elizabeth M. Bradford Holbrook	1959	Bronze
William Lyon Mackenzie King	Prime Minister	Avard Tennyson Fairbanks	1943	Bronze
Wilfrid Laurier	Prime Minister	Lionel Gooch Fosbery	1938	Plaster, painted
Alexander Mackenzie	Prime Minister	Cléophas Soucy	1943	Plaster, painted
Agnes Macphail	First woman elected to the House of Commons	Felix Weihs de Weldon	1939	Bronze
Roland Michener	Governor General, Speaker of the House of Commons	Kenneth Jarvis	1982	Bronze
Louis St. Laurent	Prime Minister, Member of Parliament	Ernest Richard Gause	1954	Bronze
J. S. Woodsworth	Leader of the Co-operative Commonwealth Federation, Member of Parliament	Cléophas Soucy	1946	Plaster, painted
John George Bourinot	Clerk of the House of Commons	Roland Beauchamp	1949	Bronze
Adam Dollard des Ormeaux	colonist and soldier in Ville Marie, New France	Alfred Laliberté	1923 (c. 1911–1915)	Bronze
La France		Auguste Rodin	1921 (1904)	Bronze
