= Henry Smith (Frontenac County politician) =

Province of Canada and Ontario politician

Sir Henry Smith
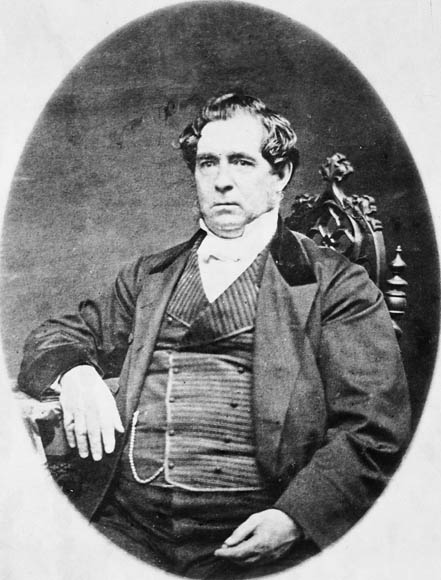

Ontario MPP
- In office 1867–1868
- Preceded by: New position
- Succeeded by: Delino Dexter Calvin
- Constituency: Frontenac

Member of the Legislative Assembly of the Province of Canada for Frontenac
- In office 1841–1861
- Preceded by: New position

Solicitor General, Canada West
- In office 1854–1858
- Preceded by: Joseph Curran Morrison
- Succeeded by: George Skeffington Connor

Speaker of the Legislative Assembly of the Province of Canada
- In office 1858–1861
- Preceded by: Louis-Victor Sicotte
- Succeeded by: Joseph-Édouard Turcotte

Personal details
- Born: April 23, 1812 London, England
- Died: September 18, 1868 (aged 56) Kingston, Ontario
- Party: Conservative
- Spouse: Mary Talbot
- Children: 8
- Occupation: Lawyer

Sir Henry Smith (April 23, 1812 – September 18, 1868) was a Canadian lawyer and political figure. He represented Frontenac County in the Parliament of the Province of Canada, and later in the 1st Parliament of Ontario.

He was born in London, England in 1812 and came to Montreal with his family some time before 1818. The family later moved to Kingston in Upper Canada. Smith's father, also named Henry Smith, served as the first warden of the provincial penitentiary at Kingston from 1835 to 1849. The son studied law with Christopher Alexander Hagerman and was called to the bar in 1834. He was elected to the Legislative Assembly of the Province of Canada in 1841 for Frontenac, serving until 1861. He was a friend of Sir John A. Macdonald and also supported him politically for much of that time.

In 1846, Smith was named Queen's Counsel. In 1854, he was named Solicitor General for Canada West in the Macnab-Morin government. He served as speaker of the house from 1858 to 1861. Smith also served as lawyer for the Grand Trunk Railway in Kingston. Smith fell out with Macdonald over his attempts to gain a knighthood. However, in 1860, he was knighted by the Prince of Wales at Quebec City during the Prince's visit to Canada. Switching to the Reformers, he was defeated in subsequent elections in 1861 and 1863.

In 1867, he was elected to the Legislature of the new province of Ontario, again as a Conservative, but died in Kingston in 1868.

== Electoral record ==
1867 Ontario general election: Frontenac
Party	Candidate	Votes	%
Conservative	Henry Smith	1,186	62.49
Liberal	John Fraser	710	37.41
Independent	B.M. Britton	2	0.11
Total valid votes		1,898	73.91
Eligible voters		2,568	
Conservative pickup new district.			
Source: Elections Ontario

1867 Canadian federal election: Addington
Party	Candidate	Votes	%
Conservative	James Lapum	1,120	52.98
Liberal–Conservative	Schuyler Shibley	991	46.88
Unknown	Henry Smith	2	0.09
Unknown	Mr. Price	1	0.05
Unknown	D. Cameron	0	0.00
Unknown	Mr. Ham	0	0.00
Unknown	Mr. Lott	0	0.00
Total valid votes		2,114	76.37
Eligible voters		2,768	
Source: 1867 Return of the Elections to House of Commons
