= John William Bell =

Canadian politician

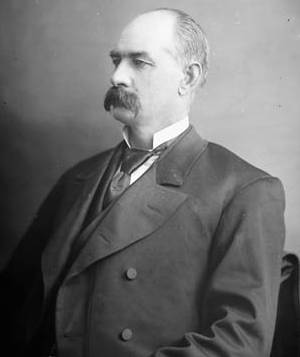
John William Bell Source: Library and Archives Canada

John William Bell (March 18, 1838 – July 5, 1901) was a farmer and Ontario political figure. He representing Addington in the House of Commons of Canada as a Conservative member from 1882 to 1891 and from 1896 to 1901.

He was born in Camden Township in Upper Canada in 1838. He obtained a teaching certificate and taught for a number of years and then began farming. He continued to teach religious school and hold a weekly Bible class for the local Methodist church. Bell served as reeve in the township and, in 1879, served as warden for Lennox and Addington counties. In 1889, he supported a motion by William Edward O'Brien which opposed the Jesuits' Estates Act. This legislation was opposed by the Orange Order, of which Bell was a member, because the pope would be involved in resolving the disposition of these properties in Quebec. Bell also opposed legislation restoring school rights for Roman Catholics in Manitoba. In 1900, Bell was elected president of the World Council in New York City for the Orange Order.

He died on his farm in Camden Township in 1901 while still in office as an MP.

== Electoral record ==
1887 Canadian federal election: Addington
Party	Candidate	Votes	%
Conservative	John William Bell	1,927	56.0
Liberal	Henry T. Shibley	1,537	44.0

1891 Canadian federal election: Addington
Party	Candidate	Votes	%
Liberal	George Walker Wesley Dawson	2,307	51.0
Conservative	John William Bell	2,246	49.0

1896 Canadian federal election: Addington
Party	Candidate	Votes	%
Conservative	John W. Bell	2,587	51.0
Liberal	Geo. W. W. Dawson	2,500	49.0

1900 Canadian federal election: Addington
Party	Candidate	Votes	%
Conservative	John W. Bell	2,442	56.0
Liberal	Wm. A. Martin	1,913	44.0

Parliament of Canada
Preceded by John McRory	Member of Parliament for Addington; 1882–1891	Succeeded by George Walker Wesley Dawson
Preceded by George Walker Wesley Dawson	Member of Parliament for Addington; 1896–1901	Succeeded by Melzar Avery
