= Kenneth Forbes =

Canadian painter

Kenneth Keith Forbes
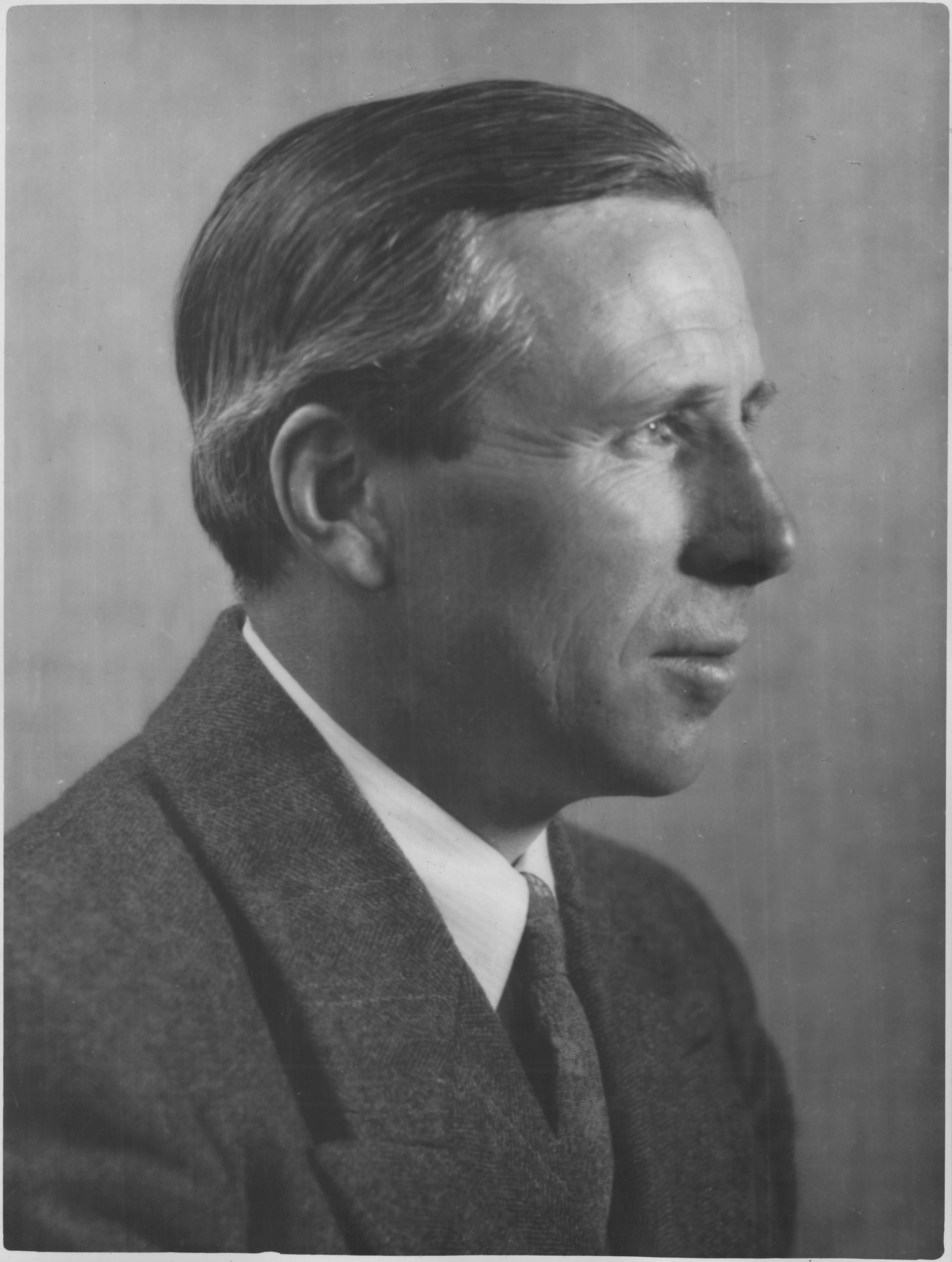
- Born: July 4, 1892; Toronto, Ontario, Canada
- Died: February 25, 1980 (aged 87); Toronto, Ontario, Canada
- Education: Newlyn School, Cornwall, Hospital Field Art School, Arbroath, Slade School of Art, London, U.K.
- Known for: Painter
- Notable work: Canadian Artillery in Action; The Defence of Sanctuary Wood
- Spouse: Jean Mary Edgell (married 1918)
- Awards: Order of Canada (1967); Chase Scholarship, Thomas Proctor Prize (twice)

Kenneth Keith Forbes OC RCA (July 4, 1892 – February 25, 1980) was a portrait and landscape painter. His painting entitled Canadian Artillery in action is on display at the Canadian War Museum.

== Life ==
Born in Toronto, Ontario, Forbes was the son of John Colin Forbes, R.C.A. (1846–1925) a distinguished portraitist who painted such notable figures as William Gladstone, Sir Henry Campbell-Bannerman and Sir Wilfrid Laurier. John Forbes' penultimate commission was the portraits of King Edward VII and Queen Alexandra which were destroyed in the 1952 fire in the Parliamentary Library in Ottawa.

Kenneth Forbes studied first at the Newlyn School, Cornwall with Stanhope Forbes, where he won a four-year scholarship to the Hospitalfield House school, Arbroath, Scotland. He won a Chase Scholarship in London with a portrait sketch, and at 19 had a portrait accepted for exhibition at the Royal Academy. In all, twelve of Kenneth Forbes portraits were exhibited at the Royal Academy.

Forbes enlisted in the 10th "Pals" Battalion of the Royal Fusiliers in 1914 and was later commissioned from the ranks. He was wounded in action and gassed. Forbes ended his combat service as second in command of the 32nd Battalion, Machine Gun Corps. After being transferred to Lord Beaverbrook's Canadian War Memorials Fund in 1918, Forbes became an official Canadian war artist. Forbes was twice Mentioned in Dispatches for his service.

According to a Toronto newspaper report from April 1918, Forbes had recently received a commission from Lord Beaverbrook (Max Aitken) to paint a series of official war pictures at the front.

Forbes was also a successful amateur boxer, being light and middle weight champion of the University of London while attending the Slade School of Fine Art. He continued his boxing while in the army, becoming champion of the British Army's 111th Brigade.

In late 1918, Forbes married his wife Jean Mary Edgell, another art student, in London. They had a daughter, June Forbes McCormack

In 1953 Forbes resigned from the Ontario Society of Artists in protest against what he considered the unwarranted recognition and attention given to abstract and what was then called "modern art". In 1958 he resigned from the Royal Canadian Academy of Arts for the same reasons. He later published a short book, Great Art to the Grotesque with an introduction and biographical sketch by Roy Greenaway, as a full statement of his rejection of the artistic worth of abstract or "Modern Art".

In 1958, Forbes, Manley MacDonald, Victor Llewellyn Child, Gordon Roy Conn and others established the Ontario Institute of Painters as a body for traditional or "realist" artists. Members included Douglas Ferguson Elliott, J. R. Tate, and Marion Long.

Forbes was awarded the Thomas R. Proctor Prize for portraiture by the National Academy of Design, New York (Now known as the National Academy Museum and School) on two occasions: 1932 and 1939.

In 1967, he was made an Officer of the Order of Canada "for his contributions to the arts as a landscape and portrait painter". In 1972 he had a book published, Great Art to the Grotesque.

Kenneth Forbes died in Toronto on February 25, 1980.

== Works ==
Title/subject	Date created	Medium
The Defence of Sanctuary Wood	circa 1917	Oil on canvas
Corporal William Metcalf V.C.	circa 1918	Oil on canvas
Canadian Artillery in Action	circa 1918	Oil on canvas
Captain Melville Millar	circa 1932 (Prescott Prize)	Oil on canvas
The Connoisseur (Gordon Roy Conn)	1935	Oil on canvas
My Wife and Velazquez	circa 1939 (Prescott Prize)	Oil on canvas
George Black	1934	Oil on canvas
James Langstaff Bowman	circa 1935	Oil on canvas
Pierre-François Casgrain	circa 1940	Oil on canvas
James Allison Glen	circa 1945	Oil on canvas
Gaspard Fauteux	1946	Oil on canvas
Robert Borden	1947	Oil on canvas
Louis-René Beaudoin	1960	Oil on canvas
Marcel Lambert	1963	Oil on canvas
Richard Bedford Bennett	1962	Oil on canvas

== See also ==
- List of portraits in the Centre Block
- Canadian official war artists
- War artist
- War art

== Bibliography ==
- Canadian War Museum (2016). "Canadian Artillery in Action". Canadian War Museum.
- Forbes, Kenneth Keith (1972). Great Art to the Grotesque. Pitt Publishing. - Total pages: 67
- Library and Archives Canada (2016). "RG 150, Accession 1992-93/166, Box 3182 - 49". Library and Archives Canada.
- Morse, Jennifer (1 March 1997). "Kenneth Forbes". Legion Magazine. Archived from the original on 29 June 2016.
- Toronto Evening Telegram (30 April 1918). "Article Title". Toronto Evening Telegram. OCLC 506030992.
