= John Wesley Edwards =

Canadian politician

The Hon. John Wesley Edwards
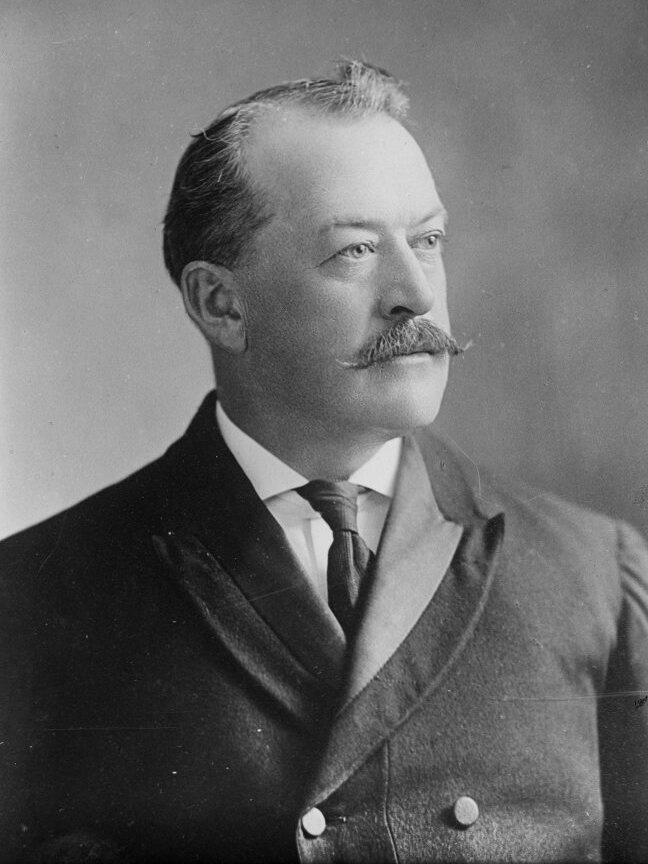
- Edwards, c. 1925

Member of the Canadian Parliament for Frontenac
- In office 1908–1921
- Preceded by: Melzar Avery
- Succeeded by: William Samuel Reed

Member of the Canadian Parliament for Frontenac—Addington
- In office 1925–1929
- Preceded by: Riding created
- Succeeded by: William Spankie

Minister presiding over the Department of Health
- In office September 21, 1921 – December 29, 1921
- Preceded by: James Alexander Calder
- Succeeded by: Henri Sévérin Béland

Personal details
- Born: May 25, 1865 Storrington Township (Latimer), Canada West
- Died: April 18, 1929 (aged 63) Carleton County, Ontario
- Party: Conservative
- Spouse: Hester Jane Purdy
- Children: John Worden Edwards (1895-1965)
- Occupation: politician
- Profession: physician and teacher
- Cabinet: Minister presiding over the Department of Health (1921); Minister of Immigration and Colonization (1921)

John Wesley Edwards, PC (May 25, 1865 – April 18, 1929) was a Canadian politician.

Born in Storrington Township, Canada West, he was a physician and teacher, before being elected to the House of Commons of Canada in the riding of Frontenac in the 1908 federal election. A Conservative, he was re-elected in 1911 and 1917 but was defeated in 1921. He was re-elected again in 1925 and 1926. He died in office in 1929. In 1921, he was the Minister presiding over the Department of Health and Minister of Immigration and Colonization.

In 1918, Edwards, and later William Folger Nickle, raised concerns in Parliament about Chief Justice Charles Fitzpatrick's use of a $2,500 allowance to cover travel costs to England to sit as a member of the Judicial Committee of the Privy Council, despite not attending any sittings. Edwards accused Fitzpatrick of "deliberately stealing from the treasury of the country and putting the money in...[his] own pockets" Fitzpatrick and Prime Minister Robert Borden responded that there was no legal issue and that Fitzpatrick had acted in good faith. When Edwards revived the issue the following year, Fitzpatrick, by then Lieutenant Governor of Quebec, returned the allowance.
