= Melzar Avery =

Canadian politician

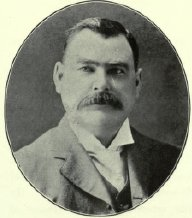

Member of the Canadian Parliament for Addington
- In office 1902–1904
- Preceded by: John William Bell
- Succeeded by: The electoral district was abolished in 1903.

Member of the Canadian Parliament for Frontenac
- In office 1904–1908
- Preceded by: Hiram Augustus Calvin
- Succeeded by: John Wesley Edwards

Personal details
- Born: September 30, 1854 Junetown, Escott township, Leeds County, Canada West
- Died: June 19, 1939 (aged 84)
- Party: Conservative

Melzar Avery (September 30, 1854 – June 19, 1939) was a Canadian politician.

Born in Junetown, Escott township, Leeds County, Canada West, the son of Isaac and Mary Avery, Avery was educated at the public School of Escott. A lumber merchant, he was a member of the County Council of Frontenac for 14 years. He was first elected to the House of Commons of Canada in a 1902 by-election for the Ontario electoral district of Addington. A Conservative, he was re-elected in 1904 for the electoral district of Frontenac. He was defeated in 1908.
