= Théophile Hamel =

Canadian artist (1815–1870)

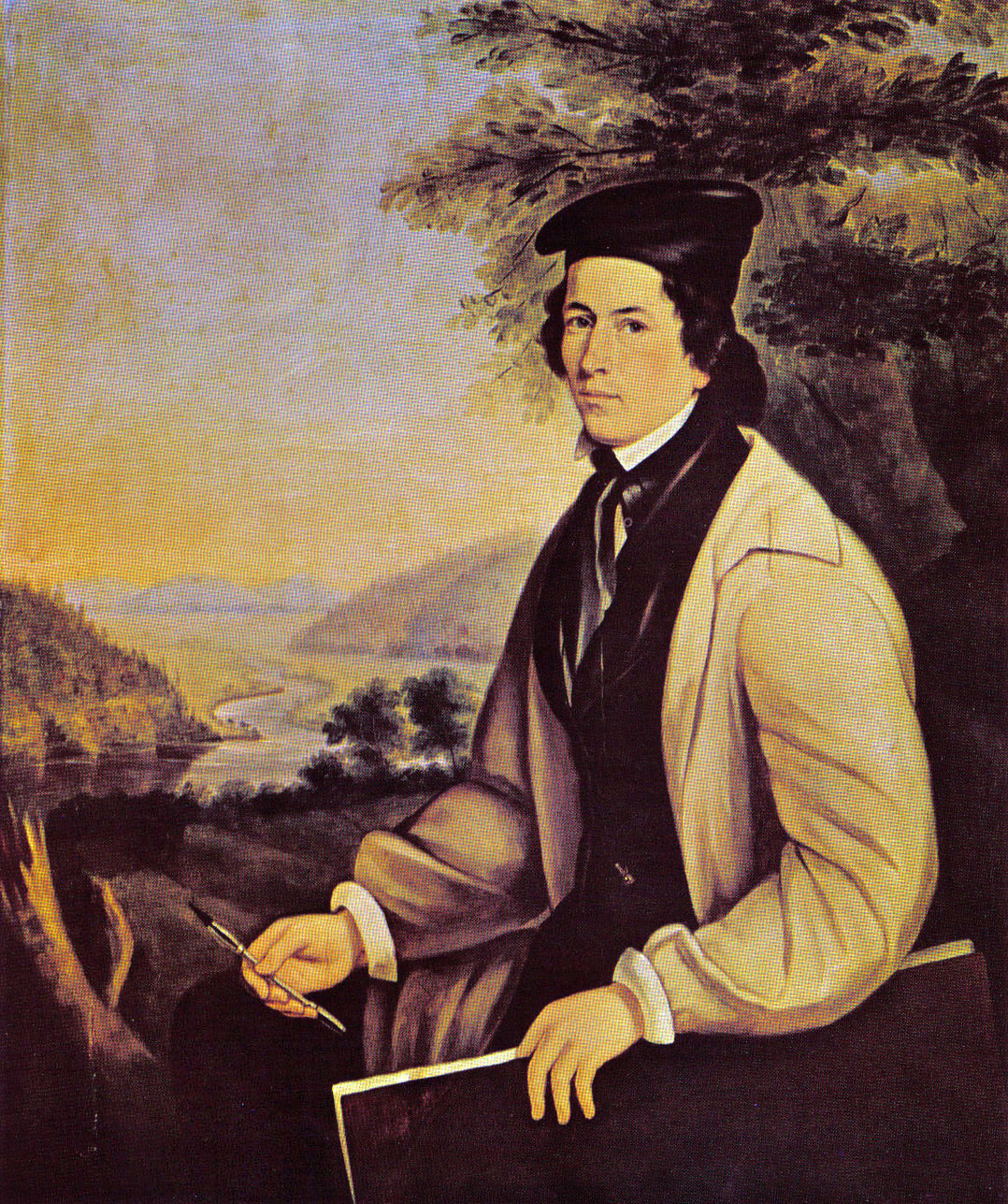
- Théophile Hamel, self-portrait c. 1837
- Born: 8 November 1817; Sainte-Foy, Quebec, Canada
- Died: 23 December 1870 (aged 53); Quebec City, Quebec, Canada
- Known for: Painter

Théophile-Abraham Hamel (8 November 1817 – 23 December 1870) was a Canadian artist who painted mainly portraits and religious images in 19th-century Quebec.

== Life ==
Hamel was born in 1817 in Sainte-Foy (then a suburb of Quebec City), the son of a successful farmer. Hamel's paternal ancestry can be traced to French immigrant Jean Hamel, who arrived in New France from Avremesnil (Normandy) in 1656. In 1834 Théophile was already taking art lessons from Antoine Plamondon. For a while he attended the Accademia di San Luca, in Rome. He was very much interested in the works of the Romantics.

== Career ==
Hamel was an apprentice for the artist Antoine Plamondon (1804-1895). Through this experience, Hamel learned to draw and paint in a European style. His early portraits show a mixture of European romanticism and Canadian simplicity. His style gradually changed to match the taste of his clients for simple, honest, even prim portraits.

In 1838 he painted 'Three Indian Chiefs Leading a Delegation to Quebec. In 1840, Hamel opened his own art studio, but decided to continue his education abroad to improve his business as a professional artist taking commissions. So, in 1843, Hamel travelled to Europe (London, Naples, Rome, Florence, Bologna, Venice, and then north to France and Belgium). In 1846 he returned to Canada to Quebec. Throughout his career he travelled throughout Canada East and Canada West, painting portraits of such notables as Sir John Beverley Robinson, Denis-Benjamin Viger, Sir Allan MacNab, Louis-Joseph Papineau, John Sandfield Macdonald, and Sir Étienne Taché. He worked quickly, often completing a portrait in a single day.

Hamel also painted religious pictures for various commissions, and a series of "imaginative" or "semi-imaginative" portraits of Jacques Cartier, Samuel de Champlain, Jean Talon, Montcalm, and General James Murray. The image of Cartier even appeared on a banknote. It is estimated that Hamel painted more than 2000 portraits during his lifetime. In 1848, he painted portraits of Robert Baldwin and Louis-Hippolyte Lafontaine. In 1850-1, he painted Egerton Ryerson. In 1853, he painted 'Madame Renaud and Her Daughters Wilhemine and Emma'. His painting 'L'Abbé Edouard Faucher', painted in 1855, now hangs at Eglise de Saint-Laurent, Lotbiniere. His painting of Sir Allan MacNab, painted in 1853, hangs in the House of Commons of Canada.

== Family ==
In 1857, at age of 40, he married Mathilde-Georgiana Faribault, daughter of George-Barthélemy Faribault, a pioneer librarian. He died in Quebec City, in December 1870.

== Gallery ==
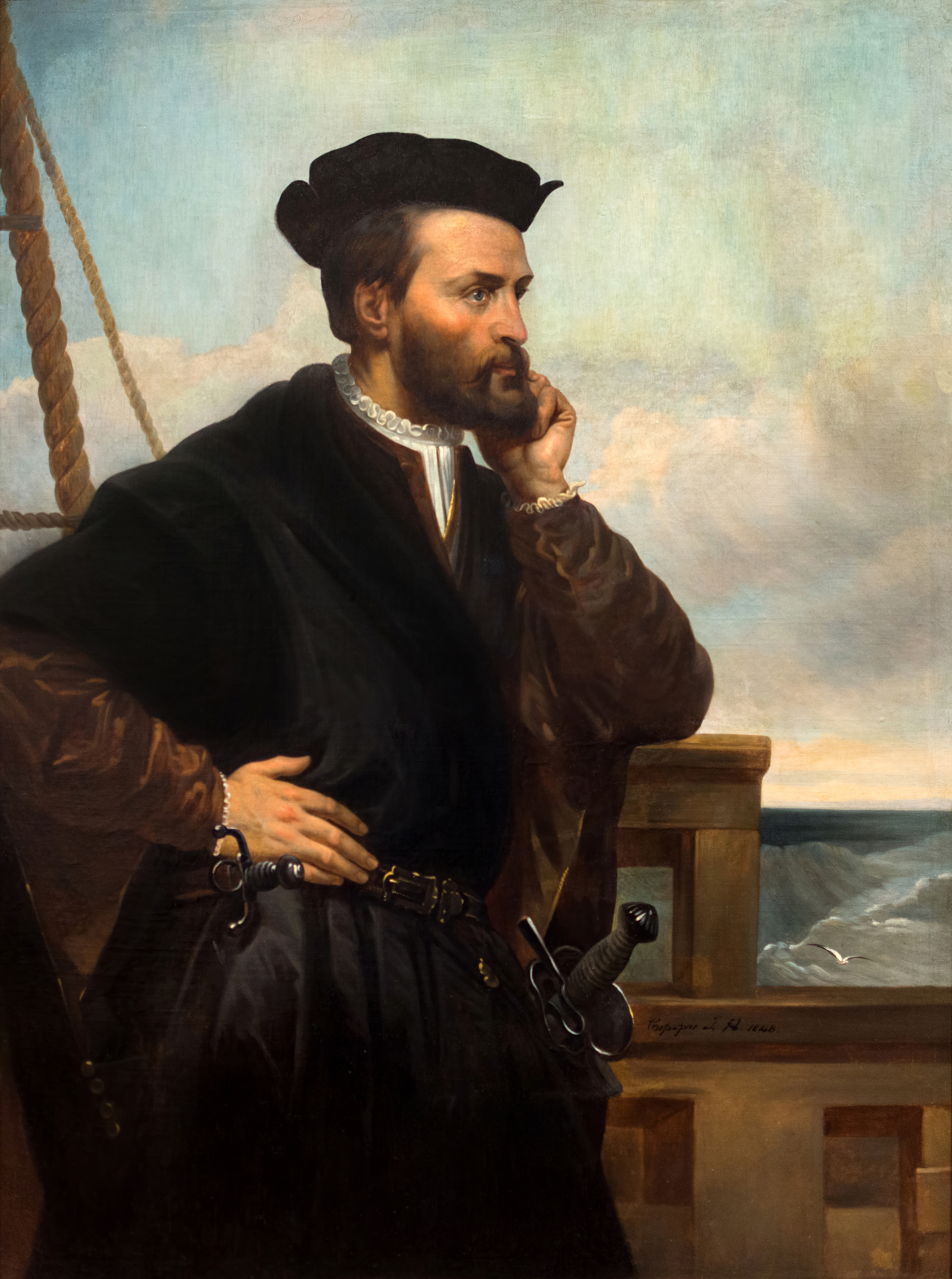
Jacques Cartier

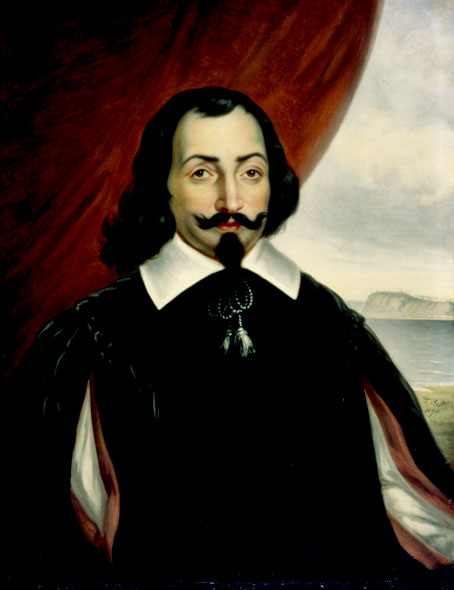
Samuel de Champlain

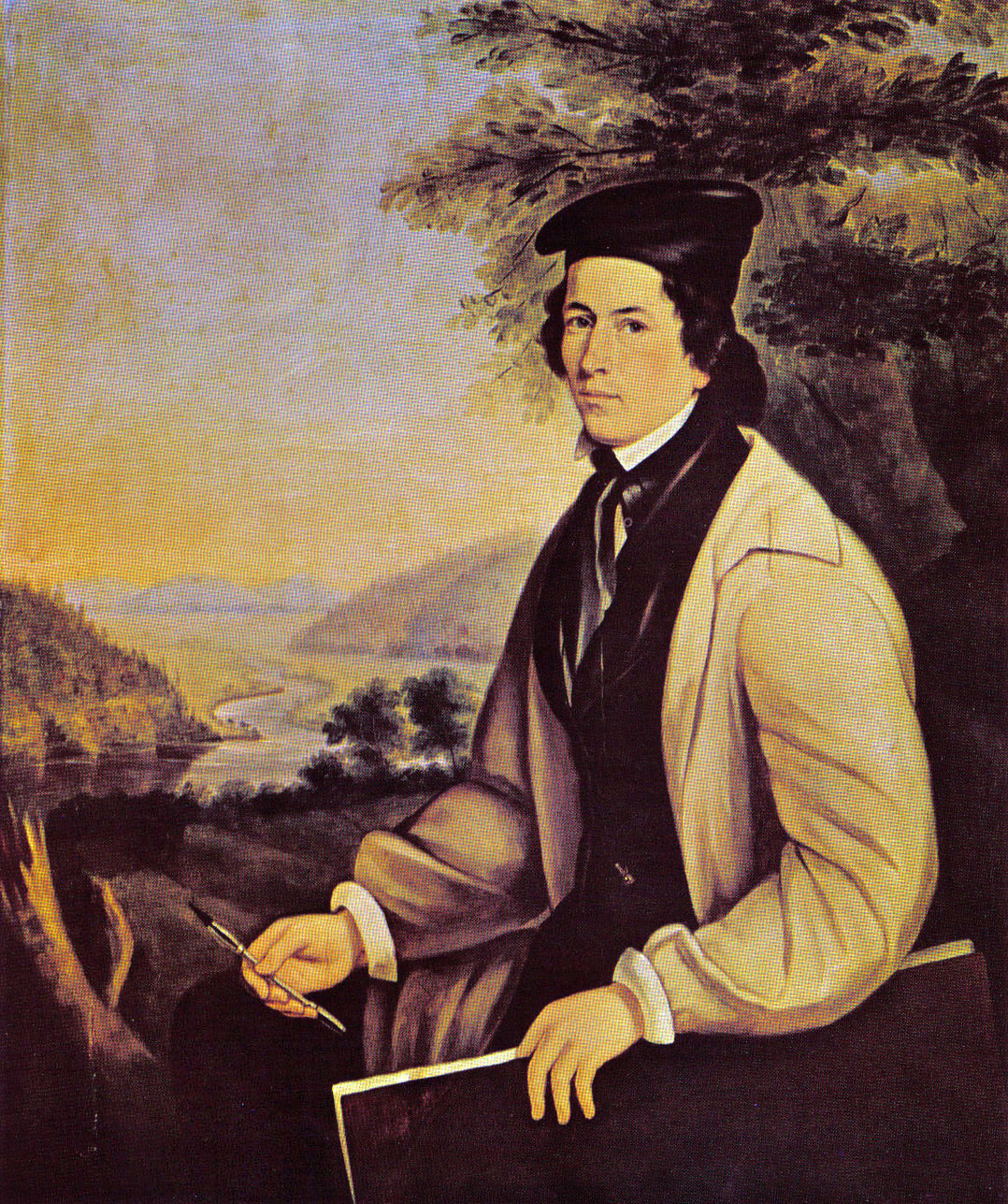
Théophile Hamel Self-Portrait 1837

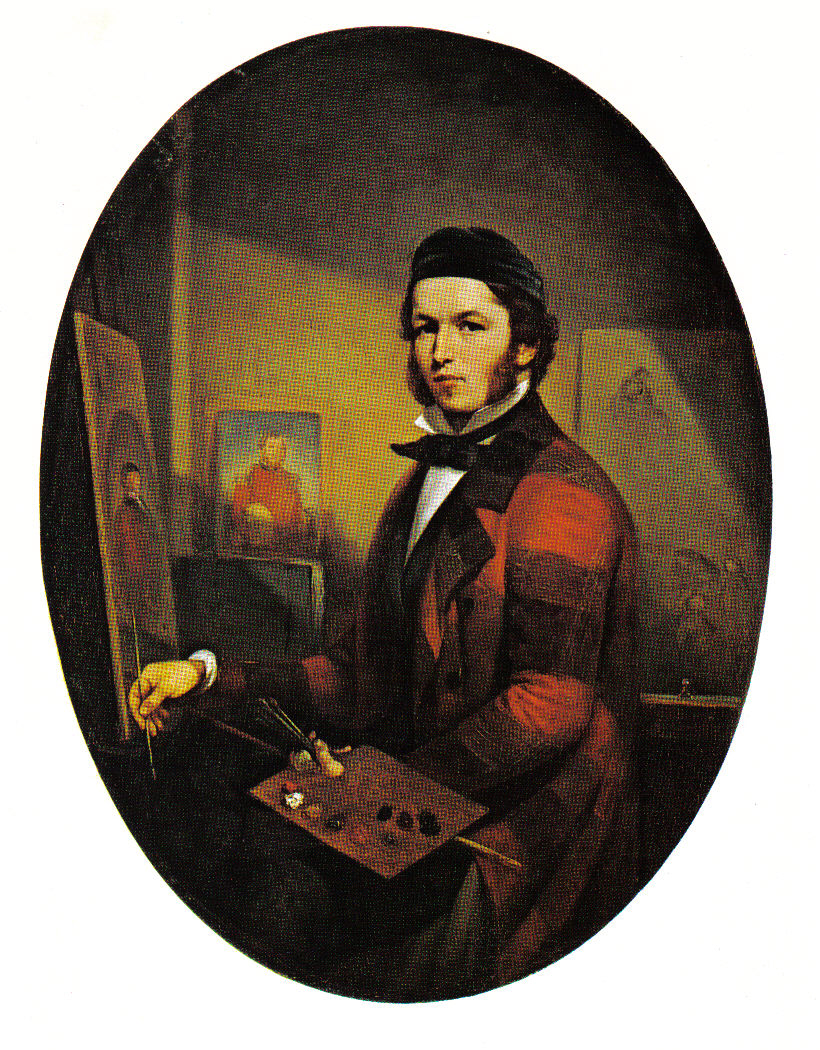
Théophile Hamel Self-Portrait 1846

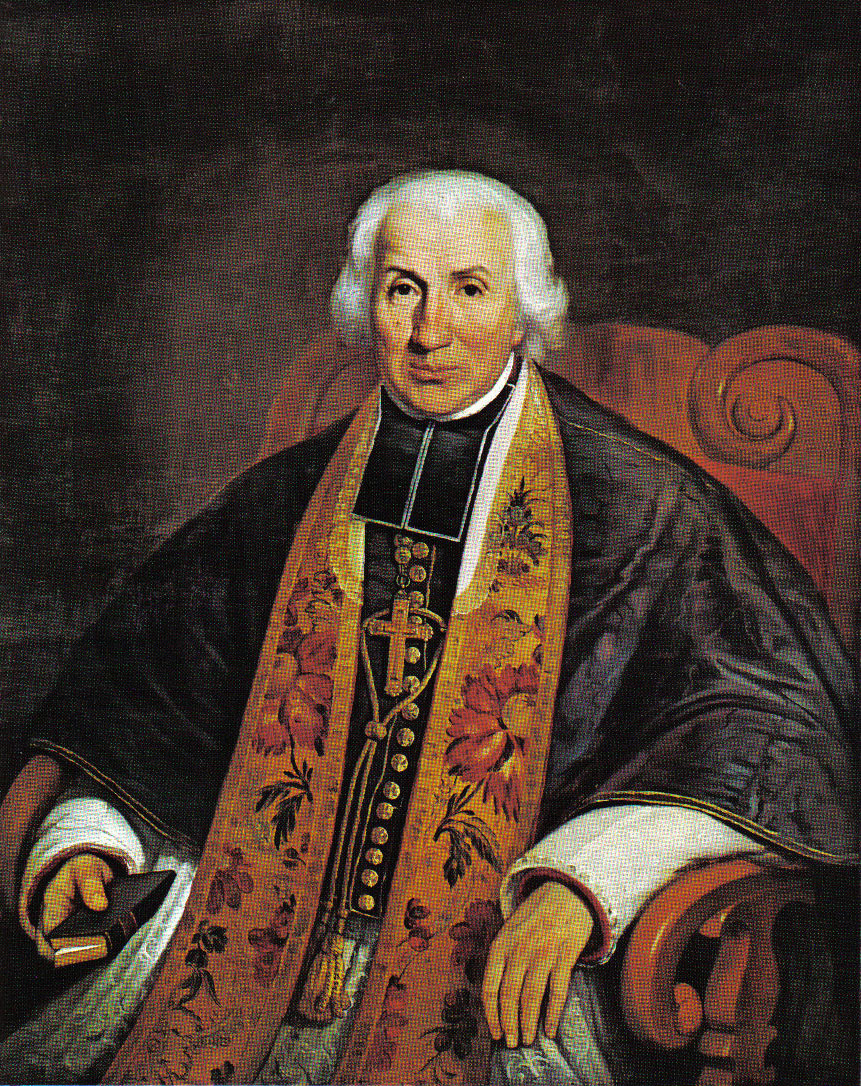
Mgr Joseph Signay

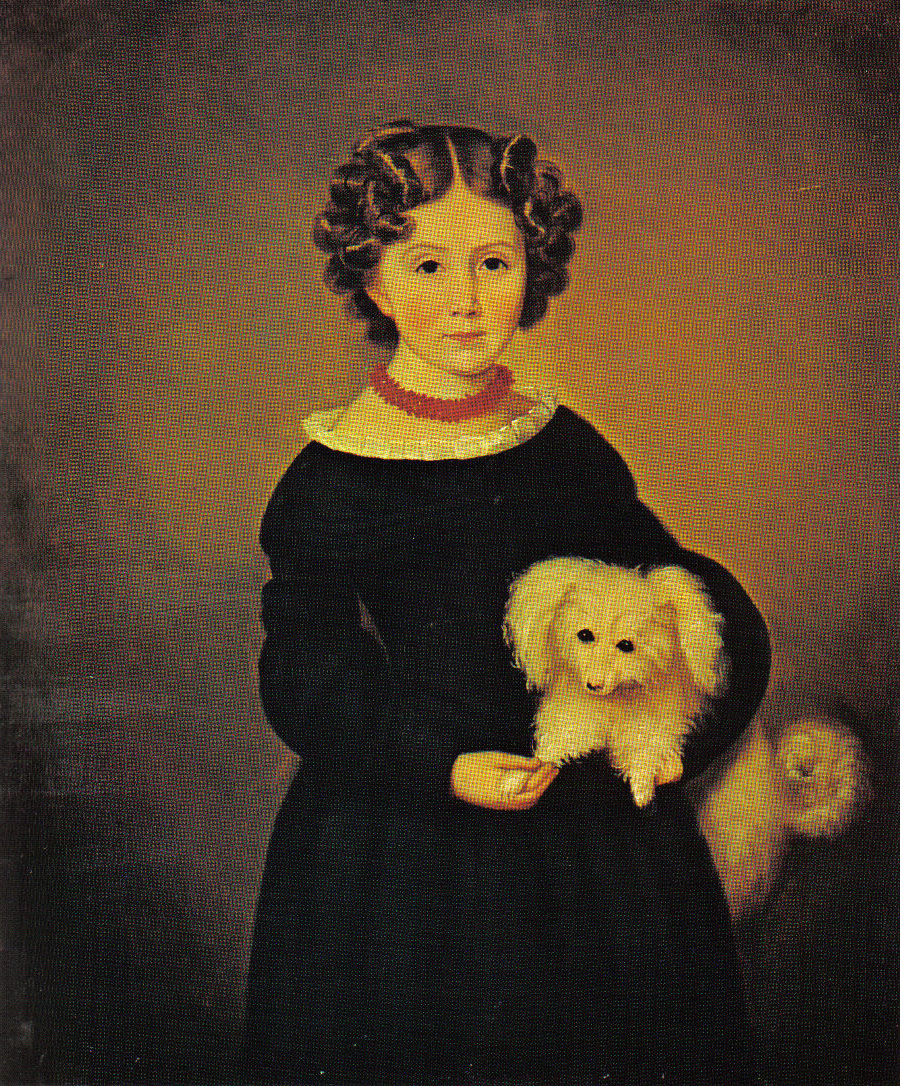
Lecodie Bilodeau

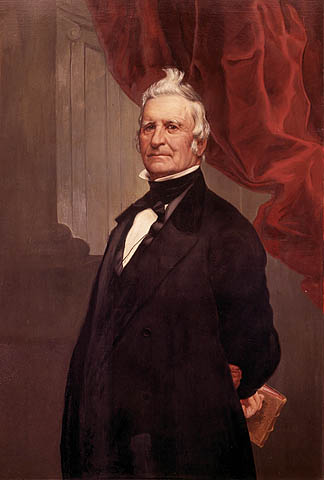
Louis-Joseph Papineau

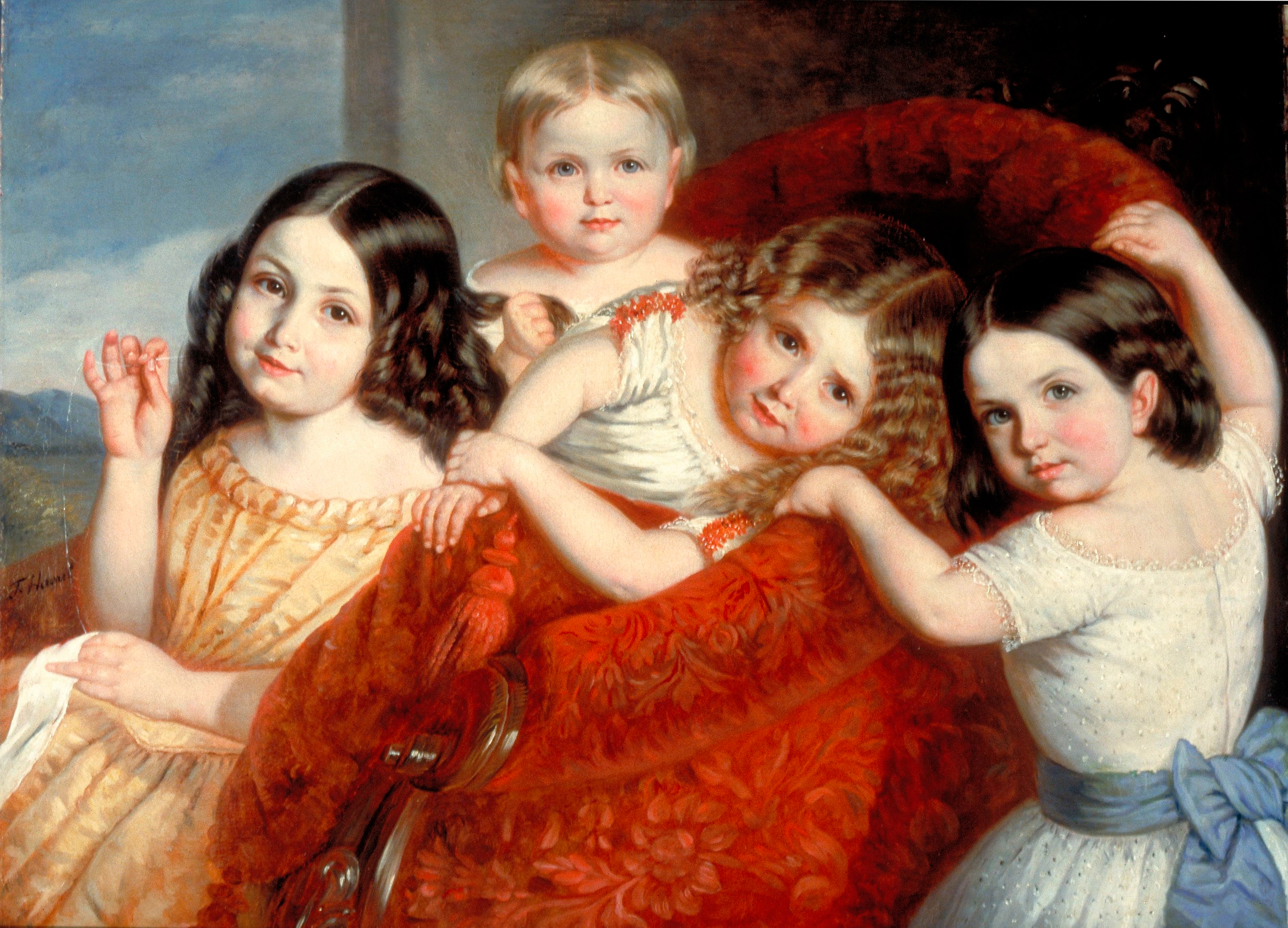
Noémie, Eugénie, Antoinette et Séphora Hamel (1854)

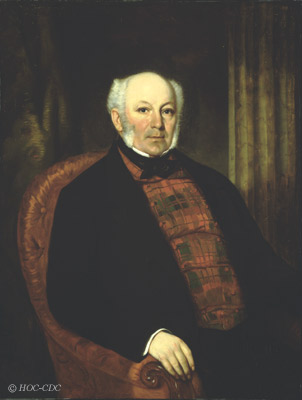
Allan MacNab

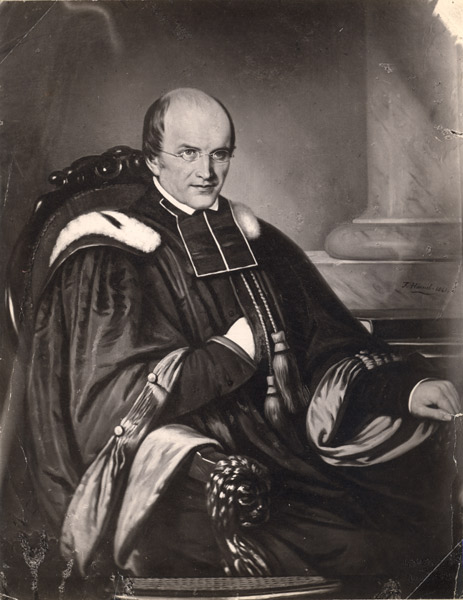
Louis-Jacques Casault

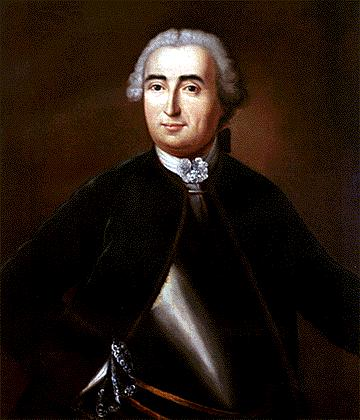
Louis-Joseph de Montcalm (1712-1759)

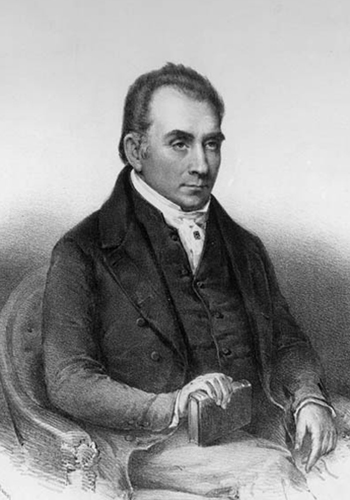
Robert Baldwin

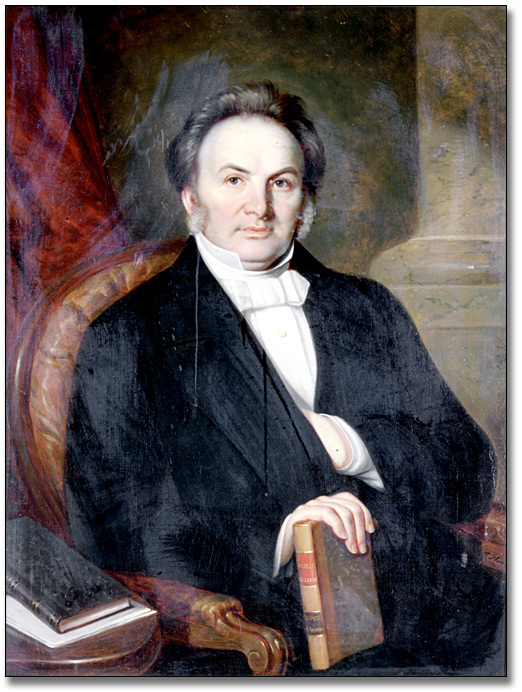
Adolphus Egerton Ryerson

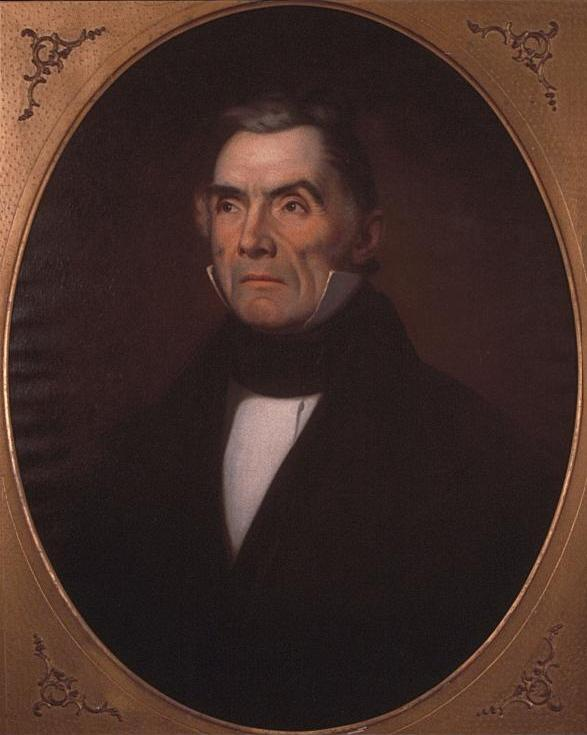
Wolfred Nelson, 1848

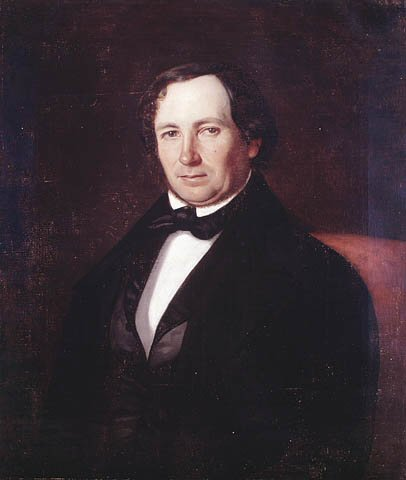
John Kane, 1852

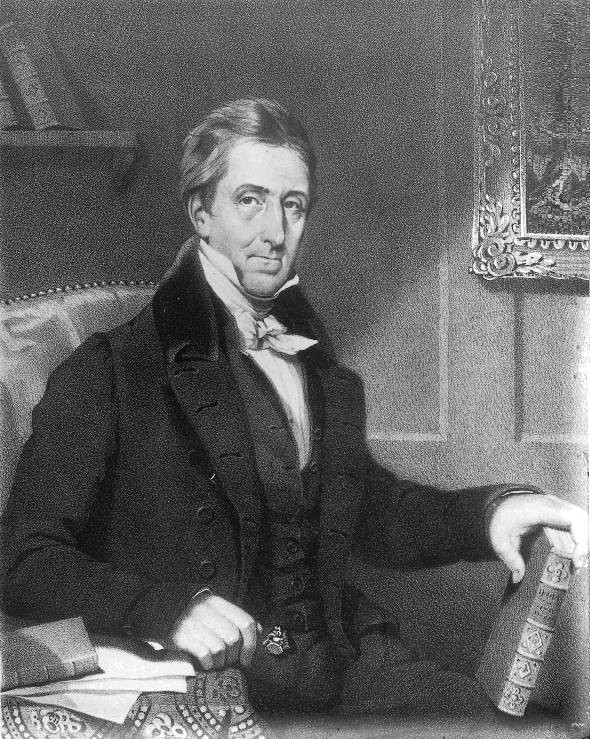
Denis-Benjamin Viger

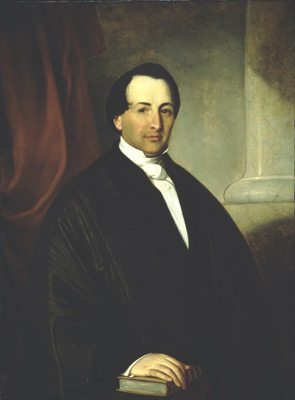
Louis-Victor Sicotte

== Works ==
Title/subject	Artist	Date created	Medium
Robert Baldwin	Théophile Hamel	1848	Oil on canvas
Louis-Hippolyte Lafontaine	Théophile Hamel	1848	Oil on canvas
Egerton Ryerson	Théophile Hamel	1850-1	Oil on canvas
'Madame Renaud and Her Daughters Wilhemine and Emma'	Théophile Hamel	1853	Oil on canvas
'L'Abbé Edouard Faucher'	Théophile Hamel	1855	Oil on canvas
Jean-Antoine Panet	Copy by Théophile Hamel	1856	Oil on canvas
David William Smith	Théophile Hamel	1859	Oil on canvas
Alexander Macdonell	Copy by Théophile Hamel	1854	Oil on canvas
Levius Peters Sherwood	Copy by Théophile Hamel	1855	Oil on canvas
John Willson	Théophile Hamel	1855	Oil on canvas
Marshall Spring Bidwell	Théophile Hamel	1854	Oil on canvas
Archibald McLean	Théophile Hamel	1854	Oil on canvas
Sir Allan Napier MacNab (Note: Also sat as the Speaker of the Legislative Assembly of the Province of Canada)	Théophile Hamel	1853	Oil on canvas
Henry Ruttan	Théophile Hamel	1856	Oil on canvas
Austin Cuvillier	Copy by Théophile Hamel	1856	Oil on canvas
Augustin-Norbert Morin	Théophile Hamel	1854	Oil on canvas
John Sandfield Macdonald	Théophile Hamel	1854	Oil on canvas
Louis-Victor Sicotte	Théophile Hamel	1855	Oil on canvas
Sir Allan MacNab	Théophile Hamel	1862	Oil on canvas
Joseph-Édouard Turcotte	Théophile Hamel	1865	Oil on canvas
Major General James Wolfe	Copy by Théophile Hamel	c. 1865	Oil on canvas
Louis-Joseph de Montcalm	Copy by Théophile Hamel	c. 1865	Oil on canvas
George Prevost	Copy by Théophile Hamel after Robert Field (c. 1808)	1864	Oil on canvas

== See also ==
- List of portraits in the Centre Block
