= Angus Neil McCallum =

Canadian politician

Member of Parliament for Frontenac—Addington
- In office November 1937 – March 1940
- Preceded by: Colin Alexander Campbell
- Succeeded by: Wilbert Ross Aylesworth

Personal details
- Born: Angus Neil McCallum; 9 April 1892 Sudbury, Ontario, Canada
- Died: 7 December 1946 (aged 54)
- Party: Liberal
- Profession: farmer

Angus Neil McCallum (9 April 1892 – 7 December 1946) was a Canadian farmer and politician. McCallum was a Liberal party member of the House of Commons of Canada. He was born in Sudbury, Ontario and became a farmer.

McCallum attended high school at Sydenham then Queen's University where he earned a Bachelor of Science degree.

He was acclaimed to Parliament at the Frontenac—Addington riding in a by-election on 1 November 1937. After serving the remainder of the 18th Canadian Parliament, McCallum was defeated by Wilbert Ross Aylesworth of the National Government (Conservative) party.
