= James Lapum =

Canadian politician (1819–1879)

James Noxon Lapum
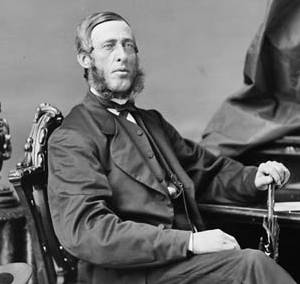

Member of the Canadian Parliament for Addington
- In office 1867–1872
- Succeeded by: Schuyler Shibley

Personal details
- Born: July 1819 Erneston, Upper Canada
- Died: July 26, 1879 (aged 59–60) Centreville, Ontario
- Party: Conservative
- Spouse: Martha Fisk (m. 1844)

James Noxon Lapum (July 1819 – July 26, 1879) was a Canadian politician.

Born in Erneston, Upper Canada (now Ontario), the son of Robert Lapum, he was a merchant and served as postmaster for Centreville for 20 years. In 1844, Lapum married Martha Fisk. He served as reeve for Camden Township for 7 years. Lapum opened a cheese factory in partnership with John Stewart Miller in 1870.

In 1867, he was elected to the 1st Canadian Parliament for the riding of Addington. A Conservative, he was defeated in 1872.

1867 Canadian federal election: Addington
| Party | Candidate | Votes | % |
|---|---|---|---|
| Conservative | James Lapum | 1,120 | 52.98 |
| Liberal–Conservative | Schuyler Shibley | 991 | 46.88 |
| Unknown | Henry Smith | 2 | 0.09 |
| Unknown | Mr. Price | 1 | 0.05 |
| Unknown | D. Cameron | 0 | 0.00 |
| Unknown | Mr. Ham | 0 | 0.00 |
| Unknown | Mr. Lott | 0 | 0.00 |
| Total valid votes | | 2,114 | 76.37 |
| Eligible voters | | 2,768 | |
Source: 1867 Return of the Elections to House of Commons

1872 Canadian federal election: Addington
| Party | Candidate | Votes | % |
|---|---|---|---|
| Liberal–Conservative | Schuyler Shibley | 1,495 | 64.0 |
| Conservative | James Lapum | 849 | 36.0 |
Source: Canadian Elections Database
