= William Spankie =

Canadian politician

Member of Parliament for Frontenac—Addington
- In office July 1929 – May 1934
- Preceded by: John Wesley Edwards
- Succeeded by: Colin Campbell

Personal details
- Born: 17 October 1859 Kingston, Canada West
- Died: 27 May 1934 (aged 74)
- Party: Conservative
- Profession: physician

William Spankie (17 October 1859 – 27 May 1934) was a Conservative member of the House of Commons of Canada. He was born in Kingston, Canada West and became a physician.

He attended private and public schools in Kingston, Ontario then proceeded to Queen's University where he received Bachelor of Arts, MD and CM degrees. Spankie served as president of the Medical Councils of Ontario and of Canada.

From 1886 to 1912, he was a public school inspector at Frontenac County. In 1913, he became a warden of the county, and from that year until 1929 he was reeve of Wolfe Island.

He ran unsuccessfully in the 1919 provincial election and was first elected to Parliament at the Frontenac—Addington riding in a by-election on 22 July 1929 then re-elected there in the 1930 federal election. Spankie died on 27 May 1934 before completing his term in the 17th Canadian Parliament.
