= Frontenac (Ontario federal electoral district) =

Former federal electoral district in Ontario, Canada

Ontario electoral district

Defunct federal electoral district
- Legislature: House of Commons
- District created: 1867
- District abolished: 1924
- First contested: 1867
- Last contested: 1921

Frontenac was a federal electoral district represented in the House of Commons of Canada from 1867 to 1925. It was located in the province of Ontario. It was created by the British North America Act 1867.

It was initially defined to consist of the Townships of Kingston, Wolfe Island, Pittsburg and Howe Island, and Storrington.

In 1903, the riding was redefined to consist of the county of Frontenac, excluding the city of Kingston and the village of Portsmouth.

The electoral district was abolished in 1924 when it was merged into Frontenac—Addington riding.

== Members of Parliament ==
This riding has elected the following members of Parliament:

Parliament	Years	Member	Party
1st	1867–1870	Thomas Kirkpatrick	Conservative
1st	1870–1872	George Airey Kirkpatrick	Conservative
2nd	1872–1874	George Airey Kirkpatrick	Conservative
3rd	1874–1878	George Airey Kirkpatrick	Conservative
4th	1878–1882	George Airey Kirkpatrick	Conservative
5th	1882–1887	George Airey Kirkpatrick	Conservative
6th	1887–1891	George Airey Kirkpatrick	Conservative
7th	1891–1892	George Airey Kirkpatrick	Conservative
7th	1892–1896	Hiram Augustus Calvin	Independent Conservative
8th	1896–1900	David Dickson Rogers	Patrons of Industry
9th	1900–1904	Hiram Augustus Calvin	Conservative
10th	1904–1908	Melzar Avery	Conservative
11th	1908–1911	John Wesley Edwards	Conservative
12th	1911–1917	John Wesley Edwards	Conservative
13th	1917–1921	John Wesley Edwards	Government (Unionist)
14th	1921–1925	William Samuel Reed	Progressive
Riding dissolved into Frontenac—Addington

== Election results ==
1867 Canadian federal election
Party	Candidate	Votes
Conservative	Thomas Kirkpatrick	1,242
Unknown	J. Carruthers	693
Eligible voters		2,545
Source: Canadian Parliamentary Guide, 1871

On Mr. Kirkpatrick's death, 26 March 1870:

By-election on 27 April 1870
Party	Candidate	Votes
Conservative	George Airey Kirkpatrick	869
Unknown	James Strachan Cartwright	517

1872 Canadian federal election
Party	Candidate	Votes
Conservative	George Airey Kirkpatrick	acclaimed

1874 Canadian federal election
Party	Candidate	Votes
Conservative	George Airey Kirkpatrick	1,172
Unknown	? Cartwright	696

1878 Canadian federal election
Party	Candidate	Votes
Conservative	G. A. Kirkpatrick	985
Unknown	J. V. Ferris	145

1882 Canadian federal election
Party	Candidate	Votes
Conservative	George A. Kirkpatrick	acclaimed

1887 Canadian federal election
Party	Candidate	Votes
Conservative	George Airey Kirkpatrick	1,192
Liberal	Henry Bawden	776

1891 Canadian federal election
Party	Candidate	Votes
Conservative	Hon. George A. Kirkpatrick	1,427
Liberal	Thomas Clyde	1,222

On Mr. Kirkpatrick being named Lieutenant-Governor of Ontario, 1 June 1892:

By-election on 10 June 1892
Party	Candidate	Votes
Independent Conservative	Hiram Augustus Calvin	acclaimed

1896 Canadian federal election
Party	Candidate	Votes
Patrons of Industry	David D. Rogers	acclaimed

1900 Canadian federal election
Party	Candidate	Votes
Conservative	Hiram A. Calvin	1,200
Independent	David Dixon Rogers	836

1904 Canadian federal election
Party	Candidate	Votes
Conservative	Melzar Avery	2,341
Liberal	Wellington J. Shibley	2,020

1908 Canadian federal election
Party	Candidate	Votes
Conservative	John Wesley Edwards	2,184
Independent Conservative	Melzar Avery	1,772

1911 Canadian federal election
Party	Candidate	Votes
Conservative	John Wesley Edwards	2,629
Liberal	Robert Hewton Fair	1,776

1917 Canadian federal election
Party	Candidate	Votes
Government (Unionist)	John Wesley Edwards	3,641
Opposition (Laurier Liberals)	James Halliday	1,658

1921 Canadian federal election
Party	Candidate	Votes
Progressive	William Samuel Reed	4,780
Conservative	Hon. John Wesley Edwards	4,557

== See also ==
- List of Canadian electoral districts
- Historical federal electoral districts of Canada
