= Abraham Dawson =

Irish-Canadian Anglican cleric

Abraham Dawson was an Irish-Canadian Anglican cleric. He was also a very prominent member of the Orange Order in Canada of the Loyal Orange Institution and member of a Canadian political family.

He was born in Killyman, County Tyrone, on 29 July 1816. As a Christian preacher, he was based in a variety of locations throughout Ireland, including Knockmanaul, Turin, Athlone, Manorhamilton, Sligo, Strabane and Newtownstewart, before immigrating to Canada West in 1864. He had about twelve children, including George Walker Wesley Dawson, who became a member of parliament. He was the grand chaplain of the Grand Orange Lodge of Canada in 1874. He died on 12 May 1884 in Plevna, Ontario.
