= Frontenac (Province of Canada electoral district) =

Province of Canada electoral district

Frontenac Canada West
Province of Canada electoral district

Defunct pre-Confederation electoral district
- Legislature: Legislative Assembly of the Province of Canada
- District created: 1841
- District abolished: 1867
- First contested: 1841
- Last contested: 1863

Frontenac was an electoral district of the Legislative Assembly of the Parliament of the Province of Canada, in Canada West, based on Frontenac County. It was created in 1841, upon the establishment of the Province of Canada by the union of Upper Canada and Lower Canada. Frontenac was represented by one member in the Legislative Assembly. It was abolished in 1867, upon the creation of Canada and the province of Ontario.

== Boundaries ==
Frontenac electoral district was located in the eastern area of Canada West (now the province of Ontario) on the north shore of Lake Ontario, at the entrance of the Saint Lawrence River. The town of Kingston was the major centre, although Kingston was a separate electoral district.

The Union Act, 1840 had merged the two provinces of Upper Canada and Lower Canada into the Province of Canada, with a single Parliament. The separate parliaments of Lower Canada and Upper Canada were abolished. The Union Act provided that the pre-existing electoral boundaries of Upper Canada would continue to be used in the new Parliament, unless altered by the Union Act itself.

Frontenac County had been an electoral district in the Legislative Assembly of Upper Canada, and its boundaries were not altered by the Union Act. Those boundaries had originally been set by a proclamation of the first Lieutenant Governor of Upper Canada, John Graves Simcoe, in 1792:

That the sixth of the said counties be hereafter called by the name of the county of Frontenac; which county is to be bounded on the east by the westernmost line of the county of Leeds, on the south by lake Ontario, on the west by the easternmost boundary line of the late township of Ernestown, running north twenty-four degrees west until it intersects the Ottawa or Grand river, thence descending the said river until it meets the northwesternmost boundary of the county of Leeds.

The boundaries had been further defined by a statute of Upper Canada in 1798:

That the townships of Pittsburg, Kingston, Loughborough, Portland, Hinchinbroke, Bedford and Wolfe Island, do constitute and form the County of Frontenac.

The only change from those boundaries in 1841 was that the county seat, Kingston, was no longer included in Frontenac riding. The Union Act provided that Kingston was its own electoral district in the new Parliament. The boundaries of Kingston electoral district were defined by the Governor General, and any parts of the town which were not included in Kingston electoral district were included in Frontenac.

== Members of the Legislative Assembly ==
Frontenac was represented by one member in the Legislative Assembly. The following were the members for Frontenac.

Parliament	Years	Member	Party
1st Parliament; 1841–1844	1841–1844	Sir Henry Smith	Tory

== Abolition ==
The district was abolished on July 1, 1867, when the British North America Act, 1867 came into force, creating Canada and splitting the Province of Canada into Quebec and Ontario. It was succeeded by electoral districts of the same name in the House of Commons of Canada and the Legislative Assembly of Ontario.
