= Thomas Kirkpatrick (Canadian politician) =

Canadian politician

Thomas Kirkpatrick, QC (December 25, 1805 – March 26, 1870) was a Canadian lawyer and political figure. He represented Frontenac in the 1st Canadian Parliament as a Conservative.

== Biography ==
He was born at Coolmine House, Clonsilla, County Dublin in 1805, the son of Alexander Kirkpatrick (1749–1818), of Coolmine House and Drumcondra House, County Kildare. His mother, Marianne (1769–1835), was the daughter of George Sutton (1737–1800), Alderman and Sheriff of Dublin. He came to Upper Canada in 1823. He studied law with his wife's cousin, Christopher Alexander Hagerman, and was called to the bar in 1828. He practised law at Kingston, where he was also a customs collector.

In 1838, he was elected as the first mayor of Kingston, but was later disqualified because he was not a resident at the time; in 1847, he was elected mayor again. In 1846, he was named Queen's Counsel.

He married Helen Fisher, one of the two daughters of Judge Alexander Fisher M.P., of Adolphustown, Ontario and his wife Henrietta McDowell, daughter of Colonel McDowell of Marysburgh, Prince Edward County, Ontario. His brother, Judge Stafford Kirkpatrick, married his wife's sister, Henrietta. He was the father of Sir George Airey Kirkpatrick, who was elected to the same seat in the House of Commons after his father's death and was named lieutenant-governor of Ontario in 1892. He died in Kingston in 1870 while still in office. Kirkpatrick is buried at Cataraqui Cemetery.

Kirkpatrick Street, a major street located in the Kingston neighbourhood of Kingscourt, is named in his memory.

== Election results ==
1867 Canadian federal election: Frontenac
| Party | Candidate | Votes |
|---|---|---|
| Conservative | Thomas Kirkpatrick | 1,242 |
| Unknown | J. Carruthers | 693 |
| Eligible voters | | 2,545 |
Source: Canadian Parliamentary Guide, 1871
