= John McRory =

Canadian politician

John McRory (February 15, 1834 – May 17, 1893) was a merchant and political figure in Ontario, Canada. He represented Addington in the House of Commons of Canada from 1879 to 1882 as a Conservative member.

He was born in Kingston Township, Upper Canada, the son of Matthew T. McRory, an Irish immigrant. He was educated in Kingston. In 1856, he married Miriam Wood. McRory served as reeve for Kingston Township from 1865 to 1877 and was the warden for Frontenac County in 1876.

1878 Canadian federal election: Addington
Party	Candidate	Votes	%
Conservative	John McRory	1,656	57.0
Liberal–Conservative	Schuyler Shibley	1,244	43.0
Source: Canadian Elections Database

Parliament of Canada
Preceded by Schuyler Shibley	Member of Parliament for Addington; 1879–1882	Succeeded by John William Bell
