= Frontenac—Addington (federal electoral district) =

Former federal electoral district in Ontario, Canada

Ontario electoral district

Defunct federal electoral district
- Legislature: House of Commons
- District created: 1924
- District abolished: 1952
- First contested: 1925
- Last contested: 1949

Frontenac—Addington was a federal electoral district represented in the House of Commons of Canada from 1925 to 1953. It was located in the province of Ontario. This riding was created in 1924 from parts of Frontenac and Lennox and Addington ridings.

It initially consisted of the county of Frontenac (excluding the city of Kingston and the village of Portsmouth), and part of the county of Lennox and Addington lying east and north of and including the townships of Camden and Ernestown.

In 1933, the Lennox and Addington portion of the riding was redefined to consist of the county of Lennox and Addington excluding the townships of Ernestown, Fredericksburgh North and Fredericksburgh South, Richmond, Adolphustown and Amherst Island.

The electoral district was abolished in 1952 when it was redistributed between Hastings—Frontenac and Kingston ridings.

== Members of Parliament ==
This riding elected the following members of the House of Commons of Canada:

Parliament	Years	Member	Party
Riding created from Frontenac and Lennox and Addington
15th	1925–1926	John Wesley Edwards	Conservative
16th	1926–1929†	John Wesley Edwards	Conservative
16th	1929–1930	William Spankie	Conservative
17th	1930–1934†	William Spankie	Conservative
17th	1934–1935	Colin Campbell	Liberal
18th	1935–1937	Colin Campbell	Liberal
18th	1937–1940	Angus Neil McCallum	Liberal
19th	1940–1945	Wilbert Ross Aylesworth	National Government
20th	1945–1949	Wilbert Ross Aylesworth	Progressive Conservative
21st	1949–1953	Wilbert Ross Aylesworth	Progressive Conservative
Riding dissolved into Hastings—Frontenac and Kingston

== Election results ==
1925 Canadian federal election
Party	Candidate	Votes
Conservative	John Wesley Edwards	7,322
Progressive	William Samuel Reed	4,554

1926 Canadian federal election
Party	Candidate	Votes
Conservative	John Wesley Edwards	7,802
Progressive	Robert John Bushell	5,158

On Mr. Edwards' death, 18 April 1929:

By-election on 22 July 1929
Party	Candidate	Votes
Conservative	William Spankie	acclaimed

1930 Canadian federal election
Party	Candidate	Votes
Conservative	William Spankie	7,432
Liberal	Samuel Dudley Stinchcombe	4,061

On Mr. Spankie's death, 27 May 1934:

By-election on 24 September 1934
Party	Candidate	Votes
Liberal	Colin Campbell	9,488
Conservative	Wilbert Ross Aylesworth	6,917

1935 Canadian federal election
Party	Candidate	Votes
Liberal	Colin Campbell	7,250
Conservative	John Abbott Pringle	6,831
Reconstruction	Harold Isadore Hellmuth	345

On Mr. Campbell's resignation, 11 August 1937, in order to take part in the provincial elections:

By-election on 1 November 1937
Party	Candidate	Votes
Liberal	Angus Neil McCallum	acclaimed

1940 Canadian federal election
Party	Candidate	Votes
National Government	Wilbert Ross Aylesworth	6,154
Liberal	Angus Neil McCallum	6,028

1945 Canadian federal election
Party	Candidate	Votes
Progressive Conservative	Wilbert Ross Aylesworth	7,707
Liberal	Harold Allen Walker	5,432
Co-operative Commonwealth	Henry Lennox Cartwright	592

1949 Canadian federal election
Party	Candidate	Votes
Progressive Conservative	Wilbert Ross Aylesworth	7,724
Liberal	Thomas Howard Dixon	6,490
Co-operative Commonwealth	Myrtle M. Morrisson	767

== See also ==
- List of Canadian electoral districts
- Historical federal electoral districts of Canada
