= George Walker Wesley Dawson =

Canadian politician

George Walker Wesley Dawson (February 14, 1858 – July 2, 1936) was an Irish-born merchant and political figure in Ontario, Canada. He represented Addington in the House of Commons of Canada from 1891 to 1896 as a Liberal member.

He was born in Sligo, the son of the Reverend Abraham Dawson, and came to Canada West with his family in 1864. He was educated in Kingston and Belleville. Dawson owned a mill. He was a Crown Land agent, reeve for Clarendon Township and also served as postmaster. In 1881, he married Amy Elizabeth Orford. Dawson was defeated when he ran for re-election to the House of Commons in 1896. He later served as inspector of penitentiaries and purchasing agent for the Department of Public Works. He was instrumental in founding the Anglican Church in Plevna, Ontario. Dawson died at his home in The Glebe in Ottawa at the age of 78.

== Electoral record ==
1891 Canadian federal election: Addington
Party	Candidate	Votes	%
Liberal	George Walker Wesley Dawson	2,307	51.0
Conservative	John William Bell	2,246	49.0
