= Wilbert Ross Aylesworth =

Canadian politician (1892–1973)

Member of Parliament for Frontenac—Addington
- In office 1940–1945
- Preceded by: Angus Neil McCallum
- Succeeded by: Wilbert Ross Aylesworth
- In office 1945–1949
- Preceded by: Wilbert Ross Aylesworth
- Succeeded by: Wilbert Ross Aylesworth
- In office 1949–1953
- Preceded by: Wilbert Ross Aylesworth
- Succeeded by: Riding abloshed; re-distributed into Hastings—Frontenac and Kingston

Personal details
- Born: 14 July 1892 Kingston, Ontario
- Died: February 5, 1973 (aged 81) Kingston, Ontario
- Party: Conservative, National Government, Progressive Conservative
- Spouse: Mary Zurbrigg (m. 1914)
- Profession: farmer, lawyer

Wilbert Ross Aylesworth (14 July 1892 – February 5, 1973) was a Canadian politician, farmer and merchant.

He was elected in 1940 as a Member of the National Government to the House of Commons of Canada to represent the riding of Frontenac—Addington. He was re-elected to the same riding in 1945 and 1949 as a Member of the Progressive Conservative. He lost when he ran in 1953 for the riding of Kingston. Prior to his federal political career, he was elected to Kingston Township, Ontario as councillor, reeve and deputy reeve between 1924 and 1940. He was also a councillor in Frontenac County, Ontario between 1926 and 1940.
