= William Samuel Reed =

Canadian politician (1864–1941)

Member of Parliament for Frontenac
- In office December 1921 – October 1925
- Preceded by: John Wesley Edwards
- Succeeded by: riding dissolved

Personal details
- Born: William Samuel Reed; 15 November 1864 Harrowsmith Village, Canada West
- Died: 24 April 1941 (aged 76)
- Party: Progressive
- Profession: farmer

William Samuel Reed (15 November 1864 – 24 April 1941) was a Progressive party member of the House of Commons of Canada. He was born in Harrowsmith Village, Canada West and became a farmer.

Reed served as a municipal councillor of Harrowsmith and from 1915 to 1920 was reeve of Portsmouth Township.

He was elected to Parliament at the Frontenac riding in the 1921 general election when he defeated John Wesley Edwards of the Conservatives. After serving his only federal term, the 14th Canadian Parliament, riding boundaries were changed and Reed was defeated by Wesley in the new riding of Frontenac—Addington.
