= Hiram Augustus Calvin =

Canadian politician (1841–1932)

Hiram Augustus Calvin (April 6, 1841 – January 13, 1932) was a Canadian businessman and politician who was a Member of Parliament from Frontenac as an Independent Conservative from 1892 to 1896 and as a Conservative from 1900 to 1904.

== Life ==
He was born on Garden Island, Canada West, the son of Delino Dexter Calvin and Marion Breck, and was educated there, at the Woodstock Literary Institute and at Queen's University.

Calvin joined his father's business and later succeeded him as lumber merchant, ship builder and forwarder. He also helped establish the Kingston Foundry and Machinery Company. In 1879, he married Annie W. Marsh. He served as reeve for Garden Island from 1884 to 1892.

Calvin was first elected to the House of Commons in an 1892 by-election held after George Airey Kirkpatrick was named Lieutenant-Governor. Calvin did not run for reelection in 1896.

He served on the board of governors for Kingston Hospital, was a trustee for Queen's University and was vice-chairman of the School of Mining and Agriculture at Kingston.

Parliament of Canada
Preceded by George Airey Kirkpatrick	Member of Parliament from Frontenac; 1892–1896	Succeeded by David Dickson Rogers
Preceded by David Dickson Rogers	Member of Parliament from Frontenac; 1900–1904	Succeeded by Melzar Avery
