= George-Barthélemy Faribault =

Canadian archaeologist

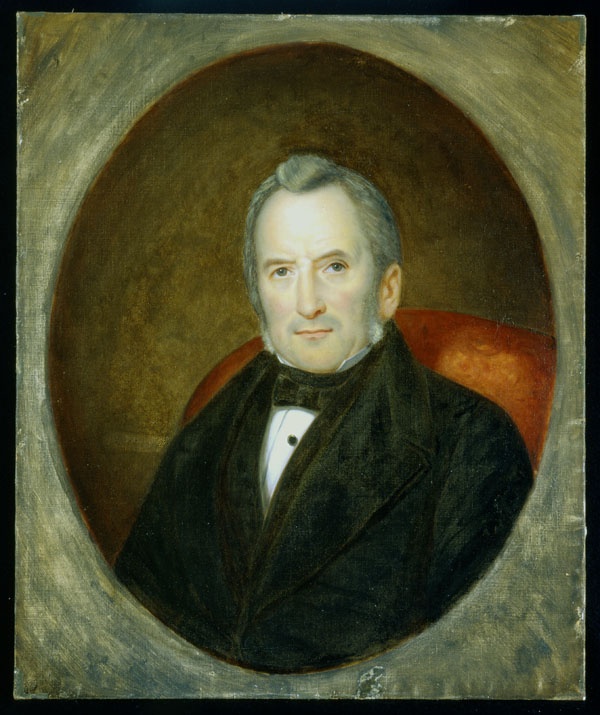
Georges-Barthélemi Faribault, 1861

George-Barthélemy Faribault (December 3, 1789 – 1866) was a Canadian archaeologist, born in Quebec.

Faribault was a first cousin of Jean-Baptiste, father of Alexander, founder of the city of Faribault, Minnesota, United States. After attending a school taught by a Scottish veteran of Wolfe's army, he completed by personal efforts the course preparatory to the study of law and was admitted to the bar in 1811.

In 1812, Faribault served as a militiaman during the invasion of Canada by the Americans. In 1822, he entered the civil service, attaining in 1832 the rank of assistant clerk of the Legislative Assembly, an office he continued to hold after the union of the Canadas (1841) until 1855, when ill-health forced him to resign.

Fond of his country and of its past, he spent his leisure in collecting documents and books pertaining to Canadian history. His collection (1700) of rare books and original manuscripts perished at the burning of the Parliament House in Montreal (1849). He began a second collection, which he bequeathed to Université Laval.

Faribault published no original works, merely reproducing and annotating a series of rare historical papers in the transactions of the Quebec Literary and Historical Society, of which he was one of the chief promoters and benefactors. His principal publication is the Catalogue of Works relating to the history of America, with bibliographical, critical, and literary notes (Quebec, 1837), which, although superseded by a few later catalogues, ranks among the best. In 1859, he realized the long-postponed plan, conceived in 1761 by Montcalm's companions in arms, of erecting a memorial tablet over the soldier's grave. The epitaph written by the French Academy at the time the subject was first brought up and approved by William Pitt, was duly inscribed. In private life, Faribault was the type of the Christian gentleman, modest, hospitable, and charitable. He counted none but friend, and left the record of a blameless career, devoted to the service of God and country. He died in 1866.

His daughter, Mathilde-Georgiana Faribault, married the Quebec portrait artist Théophile Hamel, (1817–1870).

== Links ==
- Works by Georges-Barthélemi Faribault at Project Gutenberg
- Works by or about George-Barthélemy Faribault at the Internet Archive
