= David Dickson Rogers =

Canadian politician

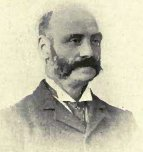

Member of the Canadian Parliament for Frontenac
- In office 1896–1900
- Preceded by: Hiram Augustus Calvin
- Succeeded by: Hiram Augustus Calvin

Personal details
- Born: June 10, 1845 County Monaghan, Ireland
- Died: January 28, 1915 (aged 69)
- Party: Patrons of Industry

David Dickson Rogers (June 10, 1845 – January 28, 1915) was a Canadian politician in the province of Ontario.

Born in County Monaghan, Ireland, his parents emigrated to Canada when he was an infant and settled in Prince Edward County, Upper Canada. Rogers was educated at the Kingston Collegiate Institute. A farmer, he settled in Frontenac County, Ontario. He was a Director and President of the Farmers' Institute and Agricultural Association. A member of the popular farmer-based Patrons of Industry, he faced no opposition and was acclaimed to the House of Commons of Canada for the electoral district of Frontenac in the 1896 federal election. He ran in the 1900 election as an independent candidate and was defeated.
