= Addington (federal electoral district) =

Former federal electoral district in Ontario, Canada

Defunct federal electoral district
- Legislature: House of Commons
- District created: 1867
- District abolished: 1904
- First contested: 1867
- Last contested: 1900

Demographics
- Population (1891): 24,151
- Census division: Addington
- Census subdivision(s): Ashby, Camden, Portland, Sheffield, Hinchinbrooke, Kaladar, Kennebec, Olden, Oso, Angelsea, Barrie, Clarendon, Palmerston, Effingham, Abinger, Miller, Canonto, Denbigh, Loughborough, Bedford

Addington was a federal electoral district in Ontario, Canada, that was represented in the House of Commons of Canada from 1867 to 1904. The electoral district was created in the British North America Act 1867.

The County of Addington consisted of the Townships of Camden, Portland, Sheffield, Hinchinbrooke, Kaladar, Kennebec, Olden, Oso, Angelsea, Barrie, Clarendon, Palmerston, Effingham, Abinger, Miller, Canonto, Denbigh, Loughborough, and Bedford.

In 1882, the township of Ashby was added to the riding.

The electoral district was abolished in 1904 when it was merged into Lennox and Addington riding.

== Members of Parliament ==
This riding has elected the following members of Parliament:

Parliament	Years	Member	Party
1st	1867–1872	James Lapum	Conservative
2nd	1872–1874	Schuyler Shibley	Liberal–Conservative
3rd	1874–1878	Schuyler Shibley	Conservative
4th	1878–1882	John McRory	Conservative
5th	1882–1887	John William Bell	Conservative
6th	1887–1891	John William Bell	Conservative
7th	1891–1896	George Walker Wesley Dawson	Liberal
8th	1896–1900	John William Bell	Conservative
9th	1900–1901	John William Bell	Conservative
9th	1902–1904	Melzar Avery	Conservative
Riding dissolved into Lennox and Addington

== Election results ==
1867 Canadian federal election
Party	Candidate	Votes	%
Conservative	James Lapum	1,120	52.98
Liberal–Conservative	Schuyler Shibley	991	46.88
Unknown	Henry Smith	2	0.09
Unknown	Mr. Price	1	0.05
Unknown	D. Cameron	0	0.00
Unknown	Mr. Ham	0	0.00
Unknown	Mr. Lott	0	0.00
Total valid votes		2,114	76.37
Eligible voters		2,768	
Source: 1867 Return of the Elections to House of Commons

Result by municipality

Municipality	Shibley	Lapum	Price	Smith	Total vote	Eligible voters
Portland Township	194	107	0	0	301	385
Camden Township	284	567	0	2	853	1,092
Olden Township	1	17	0	0	18	29
Loughborough Township	188	62	0	0	250	314
Seffield Township	117	156	1	0	274	318
Kennebec Township	7	10	0	0	17	22
Barrie Township	16	26	0	0	42	78
Kaladar and Anglesea Townships	35	20	0	0	55	88
Oso Township	2	19	0	0	21	28
Denbigh, Abinger and Ashby Townships	4	11	0	0	15	22
Newburgh	33	76	0	0	109	164
Bedford and Palmerston Townships	40	26	0	0	66	110
Hinchinbrooke Township	60	21	0	0	81	94
Clarendon and Miller Townships	10	2	0	0	12	24
Total	991	1,120	1	2	2,114	2,768

1872 Canadian federal election
Party	Candidate	Votes	%
Liberal–Conservative	Schuyler Shibley	1,495	64.0
Conservative	James Lapum	849	36.0
Source: Canadian Elections Database

1874 Canadian federal election
Party	Candidate	Votes	%
Conservative	Schuyler Shibley	1,275	56.0
Unknown	David John Waggoner	982	44.0
Source: Canadian Elections Database

On Mr. Shibley being unseated, on petition, 21 September 1874:

By-election on 28 October 1874
Party	Candidate	Votes
Liberal–Conservative	Schuyler Shibley	1,263
Unknown	David John Waggoner	920

1878 Canadian federal election
Party	Candidate	Votes	%
Conservative	John McRory	1,656	57.0
Liberal–Conservative	Schuyler Shibley	1,244	43.0
Source: Canadian Elections Database

1882 Canadian federal election
Party	Candidate	Votes	%
Conservative	John William Bell	1,659	59.0
Unknown	J.B. Aylsworth	1,157	41.0

1887 Canadian federal election
Party	Candidate	Votes	%
Conservative	John William Bell	1,927	56.0
Liberal	Henry T. Shibley	1,537	44.0

1891 Canadian federal election
Party	Candidate	Votes	%
Liberal	George Walker Wesley Dawson	2,307	51.0
Conservative	John William Bell	2,246	49.0

1896 Canadian federal election
Party	Candidate	Votes	%
Conservative	John W. Bell	2,587	51.0
Liberal	Geo. W. W. Dawson	2,500	49.0

1900 Canadian federal election
Party	Candidate	Votes	%
Conservative	John W. Bell	2,442	56.0
Liberal	Wm. A. Martin	1,913	44.0

On Mr. Bell's death, 5 July 1901:

By-election on 15 January 1902
Party	Candidate	Votes
Conservative	Melzar Avery	2,505
Liberal	F. S. Wartman	2,121

== See also ==
- List of Canadian electoral districts
- Historical federal electoral districts of Canada
