= Schuyler Shibley =

Canadian politician

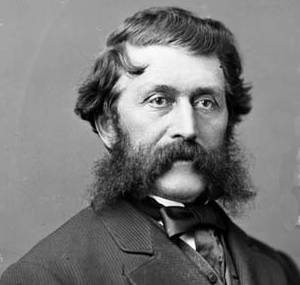
Schuyler Shibley Source: Library and Archives Canada

Schuyler Shibley (19 March 1820 – 18 December 1890) was an Ontario businessman and political figure in Upper Canada. He represented Addington in the House of Commons of Canada as a Liberal-Conservative member from 1872 to 1878.

He was born in Portland Township, Upper Canada in 1820. He studied at the Waterloo Academy near Kingston and settled on a farm at Murvale in Portland Township. He served as reeve for the township and later warden for Frontenac County. Shibley had an affair with Kate Davis of Lambton County and they had a child together; they were both accused in the death of this child but both were later released: Shibley, because he had not been present when the child died, and Davis after she was acquitted of manslaughter. In 1867, he was defeated by James Lapum for the Addington seat in the House of Commons; he was elected in 1872 as an independent Conservative. In 1873, he defected to the Liberals.

He died in Kingston in 1890.

His uncle Jacob Shibley had represented Frontenac in the Legislative Assembly of Upper Canada.

== Electoral record ==
1867 Canadian federal election: Addington
Party	Candidate	Votes	%
Conservative	James Lapum	1,120	52.98
Liberal–Conservative	Schuyler Shibley	991	46.88
Unknown	Henry Smith	2	0.09
Unknown	Mr. Price	1	0.05
Unknown	D. Cameron	0	0.00
Unknown	Mr. Ham	0	0.00
Unknown	Mr. Lott	0	0.00
Total valid votes		2,114	76.37
Eligible voters		2,768	
Source: 1867 Return of the Elections to House of Commons

1872 Canadian federal election: Addington
Party	Candidate	Votes	%
Liberal–Conservative	Schuyler Shibley	1,495	64.0
Conservative	James Lapum	849	36.0
Source: Canadian Elections Database

1874 Canadian federal election: Addington
Party	Candidate	Votes	%
Conservative	Schuyler Shibley	1,275	56.0
Unknown	David John Waggoner	982	44.0
Source: Canadian Elections Database

On Mr. Shibley being unseated, on petition, 21 September 1874:

By-election on 28 October 1874
Party	Candidate	Votes
Liberal–Conservative	Schuyler Shibley	1,263
Unknown	David John Waggoner	920

1878 Canadian federal election: Addington
Party	Candidate	Votes	%
Conservative	John McRory	1,656	57.0
Liberal–Conservative	Schuyler Shibley	1,244	43.0
Source: Canadian Elections Database
