= Louis-Victor Sicotte =

Canadian politician

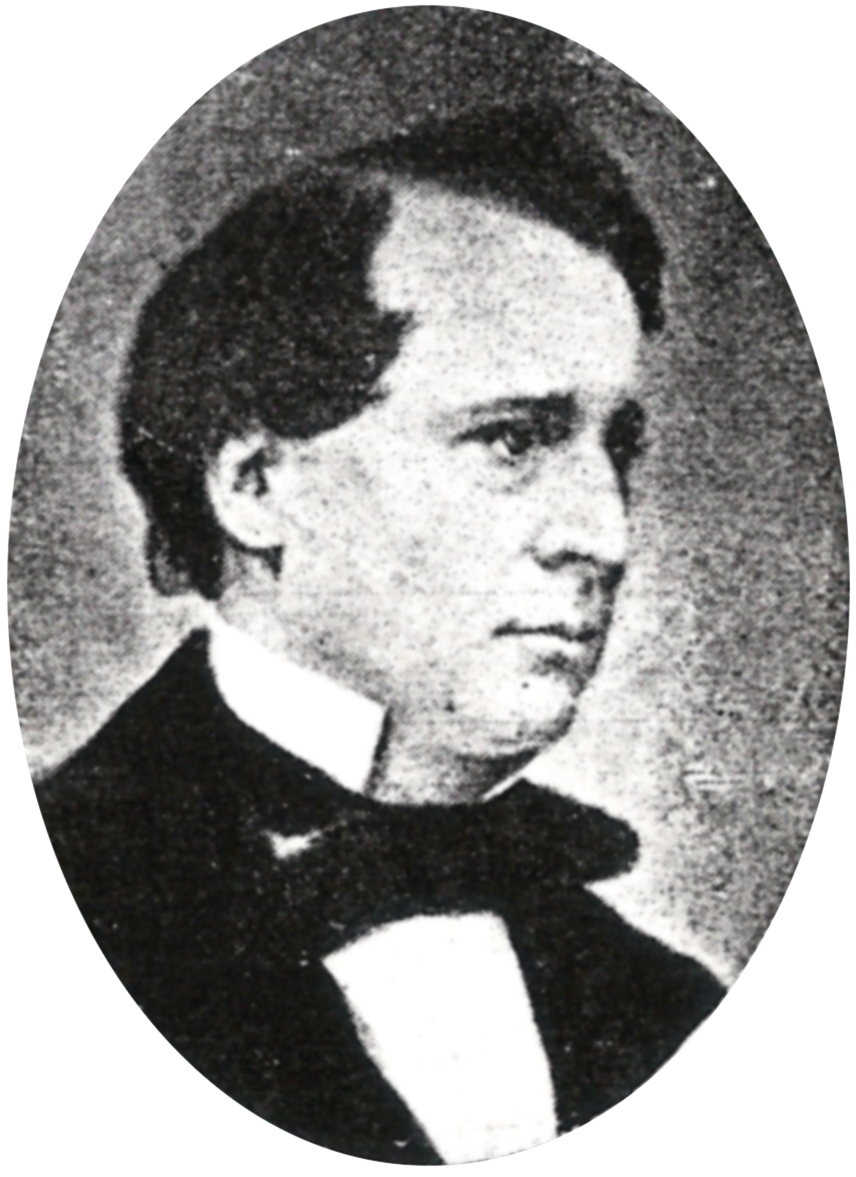

Joint Premier of the Province of Canada (Canada East)
- In office 1862–1863 Serving with John Sandfield Macdonald
- Preceded by: Sir George-Étienne Cartier
- Succeeded by: Sir Antoine-Aimé Dorion

Speaker of the Legislative Assembly of the Province of Canada
- In office 1854–1857
- Preceded by: John Sandfield Macdonald
- Succeeded by: Henry Smith

Personal details
- Born: Louis Cicot; November 8, 1812 Boucherville, Lower Canada
- Died: September 5, 1889 (aged 76) Saint-Hyacinthe, Quebec
- Occupation: Lawyer, judge

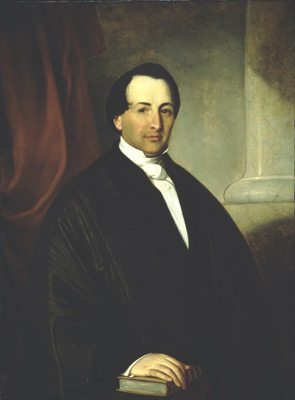
Louis-Victor Sicotte by Théophile Hamel

Louis-Victor Sicotte, QC (November 6, 1812 – September 5, 1889) was a lawyer, judge and politician in Lower Canada.

== Biography ==
He was born Louis Cicot in Boucherville, Lower Canada in 1812. He studied law and was called to the bar in 1839. He helped found the Aide-toi, le Ciel t’aidera (God helps those who help themselves) society, which is credited with introducing the celebration of Saint-Jean-Baptiste Day for French Canadians, and was also its secretary-treasurer. He supported the Patriotes but apparently took no part in the Rebellions of 1837–38. He believed, correctly as it turned out, that rebellion would lead only to an imposed union with Upper Canada.

In 1838, he set up a practice in Saint-Hyacinthe. In 1851, he was elected to the Legislative Assembly representing Saint-Hyacinthe. He became part of the Hincks-Morin government for a short time in August 1853. He was re-elected in 1854 and elected speaker. In the same year, he was named Queen's Counsel. In November 1857, he was chosen as Commissioner of Crown Lands, serving until 1 August 1858. He was re-elected in 1858 and became Commissioner of Public Works in the Cartier-Macdonald government from 1858 to 10 January 1859. He was Joint Premier of the Province of Canada with John Sandfield Macdonald from May 24, 1862 to May 15, 1863.

He refused a cabinet post in the Macdonald-Dorion government that followed and, after his reelection in 1863, introduced a motion of non-confidence, which was rejected by a small margin. In September 1863, he accepted an appointment as judge of the Superior Court in the Saint-Hyacinthe district, serving until 1887.

He died in Saint-Hyacinthe in 1889.

Sicotte Township, located in the Outaouais region of Quebec, was named in his honour (but renamed to Grand-Remous in 1973).

Preceded by Sir George-Étienne Cartier	Joint Premiers of the Province of Canada - Canada East; 1862–1863	Succeeded by with Sir Antoine-Aimé Dorion

Preceded by John Sandfield Macdonald	Speaker of the Legislative Assembly of the United Provinces of Canada; 1854–1857	Succeeded by Henry Smith
