= George Airey Kirkpatrick =

Canadian politician

The Honourable Sir George Airey Kirkpatrick PC KCMG QC
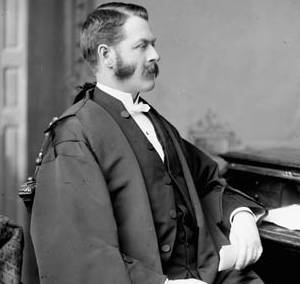
- Kirkpatrick in March 1884

4th Speaker of the House of Commons
- In office February 8, 1883 – July 12, 1887
- Preceded by: Joseph-Goderic Blanchet
- Succeeded by: Joseph-Aldric Ouimet

Member of the Canadian Parliament for Frontenac
- In office April 27, 1870 – May 30, 1892
- Preceded by: Thomas Kirkpatrick
- Succeeded by: Hiram Augustus Calvin

7th Lieutenant Governor of Ontario
- In office May 30, 1892 – November 7, 1896
- Monarch: Victoria
- Governors General: The Lord Stanley of Preston; The Earl of Aberdeen
- Premier: Oliver Mowat; Arthur Sturgis Hardy
- Preceded by: Sir Alexander Campbell
- Succeeded by: Sir Casimir Gzowski (acting)

Personal details
- Born: September 13, 1841 Kingston, Canada West
- Died: December 13, 1899 (aged 58) Toronto, Ontario, Canada
- Party: Conservative
- Spouse(s): Frances Jane Macaulay (died 1877); Isabel Louise Macpherson (m. 1883)
- Children: 4 sons and 1 daughter (from his first marriage); 1 son (from his second marriage)
- Parent: Thomas Kirkpatrick (father) (father)
- Education: Trinity College Dublin
- Occupation: Politician
- Profession: Lawyer, militia officer, and businessman

Sir George Airey Kirkpatrick PC KCMG QC (September 13, 1841 – December 13, 1899) was a Canadian politician who was the 4th Speaker of the House of Commons from 1883 to 1887 and a Member of Parliament from 1870 to 1892.

== Early life ==
Born in 1841, in Kingston, Ontario, the son of Thomas Kirkpatrick, George Kirkpatrick was educated at Trinity College Dublin.

== Career ==
Kirkpatrick joined the Canadian Militia as a private in 1861 during the Trent Affair and later as an officer and the adjutant in the 14th Battalion of Rifles saw active service during the Fenian Raids in 1866. In 1867, he was promoted to major and joined the newly formed 47th Frontenac Battalion of Infantry and was promoted to lieutenant colonel in 1872. He retired from the militia in 1890. In 1876, he would command the Canadian rifle team at Wimbledon (London), England, and he was president of the Dominion Rifle Association through the 1880s.

He was called to the bar in 1865 and served as a Conservative member of Parliament (MP) in the House of Commons from 1870 to 1892 taking over the Frontenac seat held by his late father.

He was a supporter of Sir John A. Macdonald's National Policy but was also a friend of Liberal leader Edward Blake whom he supported on issues such as proportional representation. Kirkpatrick considered joining the Liberal Party over the Pacific Scandal but decided to remain with the Conservatives.

In 1875, Kirkpatrick contested the Governor General's right to pardon Louis Riel without the consent of the Canadian Cabinet. As a result of his arguments, the Colonial Office issued new instructions that future Governors General not act without the advice of his ministers in such matters.

Kirkpatrick also argued in favour of protection of sailors from ship-owners who went bankrupt.

Following the 1882 election, Prime Minister Macdonald nominated Kirkpatrick as 4th speaker of the House of Commons. He was unenthusiastic about the position, but was nevertheless considered to be the most impartial Canadian Speaker of the nineteenth century. The Conservative government was unimpressed with his lack of partisanship, and he was not renominated for the position following the 1887 election. He returned to the backbenches where he remained until 1892 when he was appointed the seventh Lieutenant Governor of Ontario by Sir John Abbott.

During his time in office, Kirkpatrick made a special effort to visit and support the rural areas of the province. He served until 1896, and was knighted the same year. Sir Mackenzie Bowell offered Kirkpatrick a position in the Cabinet, but by this time, he had lost interest in politics. He died in Toronto in 1899.

== Family ==
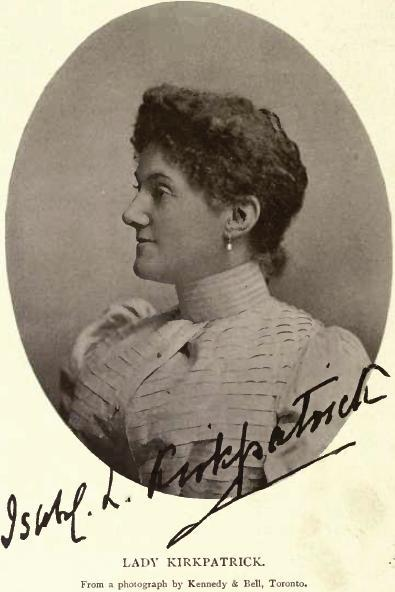
Lady Isabel Louise Kirkpatrick (née Macpherson) by Kennedy & Bell, Toronto

In 1865, Kirkpatrick married Frances Macauley, and after her death, married Isabel Macpherson at Paris, France, September 26, 1883. Isabel Louise Macpherson, was the daughter of the Hon. Sir D. L. Macpherson, P.C., K.C.M.G., and his wife, Elizabeth Sarah, daughter of William Molson, Esquire, of Montreal. She was born in Toronto, and educated in England. While first lady of Ontario, she secured funds for the presentation of a wedding gift to the present Prince and Princess of Wales and assisted in securing the establishment in Canada of a branch of the St. John Ambulance Association. In 1898 she was selected to present colours to the Army and Navy Veterans.

His son was General Sir George Macaulay Kirkpatrick Knight Commander of the Order of the Bath, Knight Commander of the Order of the Star of India.

== Legacy ==
Upper Canada College has a chair that once belonged to George Airey Kirkpatrick.

Government offices
Preceded by Sir Alexander Campbell	Lieutenant Governor of Ontario; 1892–1896	Succeeded by Sir Casimir Gzowski (acting)
