= Antigonish (provincial electoral district) =

Provincial electoral district in Nova Scotia, Canada

Coordinates: 45.6380°N 61.8324°W

Nova Scotia electoral district

Provincial electoral district
- Legislature: Nova Scotia House of Assembly
MLA
Michelle Thompson
Progressive Conservative
- District created: 1867
- First contested: 1867
- Last contested: 2024

Demographics
- Population (2011): 19,590
- Electors: 13,314
- Area (km²): 1,353
- Pop. density (per km²): 14.5
- Census division: Antigonish County
- Census subdivision: Antigonish

Antigonish is a provincial electoral district in Nova Scotia, Canada, that elects one member of the Nova Scotia House of Assembly. It has existed since 1867 and is one of only four Nova Scotian districts that has existed continuously since Canadian Confederation.

The district includes the community of Antigonish and the surrounding Antigonish County. It is bordered by Pictou East to the west, Guysborough-Sheet Harbour to its south, the Strait of Canso to the east, and the Northumberland Strait to the north.

With the electoral boundary changes announced on September 12, 2012, the area east of Tracadie River is moved to the new riding of Guysborough–Eastern Shore–Tracadie.

== Geography ==
The electoral district of Antigonish covers 1,353 km^{2} (522 sq mi) of land.

== Members of the Legislative Assembly ==
This riding has elected the following members of the Legislative Assembly:

=== Dual-member era ===
Legislature	Years	Member A	Party	Member B	Party
24th	1867–1871	Daniel MacDonald	Liberal	Joseph MacDonald	Liberal
25th	1871–1874	Daniel MacDonald	Liberal	Joseph MacDonald	Liberal
26th	1874–1877	Daniel MacDonald	Liberal	John J. McKinnon	Independent
26th	1877–1878	Daniel MacDonald	Liberal	John Sparrow David Thompson	Conservative
27th	1878–1882	Angus McGillivray	Liberal	John Sparrow David Thompson	Conservative
28th	1882	Angus McGillivray	Liberal	John Sparrow David Thompson	Conservative
28th	1882–1886	Angus McGillivray	Liberal	Charles B. Whidden	Conservative
29th	1886–1890	Angus McGillivray	Liberal	Colin Francis McIsaac	Liberal
30th	1890–1891	Angus McGillivray	Liberal	Colin Francis McIsaac	Liberal
30th	1891–1894	Christopher P. Chisholm	Liberal	Colin Francis McIsaac	Liberal
31st	1894–1895	Christopher P. Chisholm	Liberal	Colin Francis McIsaac	Liberal
31st	1895–1897	Christopher P. Chisholm	Liberal	Angus McGillivray	Liberal
32nd	1897–1901	Christopher P. Chisholm	Liberal	Angus McGillivray	Liberal
33rd	1901–1903	Christopher P. Chisholm	Liberal	Angus McGillivray	Liberal
33rd	1903–1906	Christopher P. Chisholm	Liberal	Fred Robert Trotter	Liberal
34th	1906–1911	Christopher P. Chisholm	Liberal	Fred Robert Trotter	Liberal
35th	1911	Edward Lavin Girroir	Liberal-Conservative	Fred Robert Trotter	Liberal
35th	1913–1916	John Sarsfield O'Brien	Liberal-Conservative	Fred Robert Trotter	Liberal
36th	1916–1920	William Chisholm	Liberal	Fred Robert Trotter	Liberal
37th	1920–1925	William Chisholm	Liberal	Angus J. MacGillivray	United Farmers
38th	1925–1928	William Chisholm	Liberal	John Laughlin McIsaac	Liberal
39th	1928–1933	William Chisholm	Liberal	John Laughlin McIsaac	Liberal

=== Single-member era ===
Antigonish
Legislature	Years	Member	Party
Riding returned 2 members prior to 1933
40th	1933–1937	John Laughlin McIsaac	Liberal
41st	1937–1941	John Laughlin McIsaac	Liberal
42nd	1941–1942	John A. MacIsaac	Liberal
42nd	1942–1945	John Patrick Gorman	Liberal
43rd	1945–1949	John Patrick Gorman	Liberal
44th	1949–1953	Colin H. Chisholm	Liberal
45th	1953–1956	Colin H. Chisholm	Liberal
46th	1956–1960	William F. MacKinnon	Progressive Conservative
47th	1960–1963	William F. MacKinnon	Progressive Conservative
48th	1963–1967	William F. MacKinnon	Progressive Conservative
49th	1967–1970	William F. MacKinnon	Progressive Conservative
50th	1970–1974	Bill Gillis	Liberal
51st	1974–1978	Bill Gillis	Liberal
52nd	1978–1981	Bill Gillis	Liberal
53rd	1981–1984	Bill Gillis	Liberal
54th	1984–1988	Bill Gillis	Liberal
55th	1988–1993	Bill Gillis	Liberal
56th	1993–1998	Bill Gillis	Liberal
57th	1998–1999	Hyland Fraser	Liberal
58th	1999–2003	Angus MacIsaac	Progressive Conservative
59th	2003–2006	Angus MacIsaac	Progressive Conservative
60th	2006–2009	Angus MacIsaac	Progressive Conservative
61st	2009–2009	Angus MacIsaac	Progressive Conservative
61st	2009–2013	Maurice Smith	New Democratic
62nd	2013–2017	Randy Delorey	Liberal
63rd	2017–2021	Randy Delorey	Liberal
64th	2021–2024	Michelle Thompson	Progressive Conservative
65th	2024–present	Michelle Thompson	Progressive Conservative

== Election results ==
=== 2024 ===
2024 Nova Scotia general election
Party	Candidate	Votes	%	±%
Progressive Conservative	Michelle Thompson	5,202	64.82	+4.98
Liberal	Sheila Sears	1,720	21.43	-16.67
New Democratic	John David MacIsaac	1,103	13.74	–
Total		8,025	–	
Total rejected ballots		48		
Turnout		8,076	52.37	
Eligible voters		15,422		
Progressive Conservative hold		Swing		
Source: Elections Nova Scotia

=== 2021 ===
2021 Nova Scotia general election
Party	Candidate	Votes	%	±%	Expenditures
Progressive Conservative	Michelle Thompson	4,707	49.98	+14.86	$53,998.17
Liberal	Randy Delorey	2,997	31.82	-11.56	$62,427.05
New Democratic	Moraig Macgillivray	1,552	16.48	-3.83	$47,736.84
Green	Will Fraser	128	1.36	–	$274.35
Atlantica	Ryan Smyth	34	0.36	-0.83	$200.00
Total valid votes/expense limit		9.418	99.59	-0.01	$85,581.45
Total rejected ballots		39	0.41	+0.01	
Turnout		9,457	64.78	+2.68	
Eligible voters		14,599			
Progressive Conservative gain from Liberal		Swing		+13.21	
Source: Elections Nova Scotia

=== 2017 ===
2017 Nova Scotia general election
Party	Candidate	Votes	%	±%
Liberal	Randy Delorey	3,877	43.38	+0.60
Progressive Conservative	Ray Mattie	3,139	35.12	+3.52
New Democratic	Moraig MacGillivray	1,815	20.31	-5.30
Atlantica	Ryan Smyth	106	1.19	
Total valid votes		8,973	99.60	
Total rejected ballots		36	0.40	-0.48
Turnout		8,973	62.08	-3.12
Eligible voters		14,455		
Liberal hold		Swing		-1.46
Source: Elections Nova Scotia

=== 2013 ===
2013 Nova Scotia general election
Party	Candidate	Votes	%	±%
Liberal	Randy Delorey	3,882	42.78%	20.10%
Progressive Conservative	Darren Thompson	2,868	31.61%	-3.78%
New Democratic	Maurice Smith	2,324	25.61%	-15.41%
Total valid votes		9,074	100.00	
Total rejected ballots		81	0.88	
Turnout		9,155	65.20	
Eligible voters		14,041		
Source(s) Source: Nova Scotia Legislature (2024). "Electoral History for Antigonish" (PDF). nslegislature.ca. Nova Scotia, Chief Electoral Officer (2013). 39th Provincial General Election, October 8, 2013: Volume 1 – Statement of Votes & Statistics (PDF) (Report). Elections Nova Scotia. Archived from the original (PDF) on April 10, 2018.

=== 2009 ===
Nova Scotia provincial by-election, 2009-10-20
Party	Candidate	Votes	%	±%
New Democratic	Maurice Smith	3,310	41.02%	5.84%
Progressive Conservative	Darren Thompson	2,855	35.38%	-2.69%
Liberal	Miles Tompkins	1,830	22.68%	-2.38%
Green	Michael Marshall	74	0.92%	-0.77%
Total		8,069	–	
Source(s) Source: Nova Scotia Legislature (2024). "Electoral History for Antigonish" (PDF). nslegislature.ca.

=== 2009 ===
2009 Nova Scotia general election
Party	Candidate	Votes	%	±%
Progressive Conservative	Angus MacIsaac	3,613	38.08%	-10.14%
New Democratic	Maurice Smith	3,338	35.18%	16.15%
Liberal	Miles Tompkins	2,378	25.06%	-5.83%
Green	Rebecca Steeves Mosher	160	1.69%	-0.18%
Total		9,489	–	
Source(s) Source: Nova Scotia Legislature (2024). "Electoral History for Antigonish" (PDF). nslegislature.ca.

=== 2006 ===
2006 Nova Scotia general election
Party	Candidate	Votes	%	±%
Progressive Conservative	Angus MacIsaac	4,662	48.22%	6.58%
Liberal	Daniel J. MacIsaac	2,987	30.89%	-4.82%
New Democratic	Andrew MacDonald	1,840	19.03%	1.86%
Green	Judith Dowden	180	1.86%	–
Total		9,669	–	
Source(s) Source: Nova Scotia Legislature (2024). "Electoral History for Antigonish" (PDF). nslegislature.ca.

=== 2003 ===
2003 Nova Scotia general election
Party	Candidate	Votes	%	±%
Progressive Conservative	Angus MacIsaac	4,256	41.64%	2.34%
Liberal	David Allister Cameron	3,650	35.71%	-3.47%
New Democratic	Terry O'Toole	1,755	17.17%	-4.35%
Marijuana	Gene Purdy	560	5.48%	–
Total		10,221	–	
Source(s) Source: Nova Scotia Legislature (2024). "Electoral History for Antigonish" (PDF). nslegislature.ca.

=== 1999 ===
1999 Nova Scotia general election
Party	Candidate	Votes	%	±%
Progressive Conservative	Angus MacIsaac	4,070	39.30%	7.53%
Liberal	Hyland Fraser	4,058	39.18%	-2.37%
New Democratic	Charlene Long	2,229	21.52%	-5.17%
Total		10,357	–	
Source(s) Source: Nova Scotia Legislature (2024). "Electoral History for Antigonish" (PDF). nslegislature.ca. Nova Scotia, Chief Electoral Officer (1999). Returns of the General Election for the House of Assembly, Thirty-Fifth General Election (Report). Elections Nova Scotia.

=== 1998 ===
1998 Nova Scotia general election
Party	Candidate	Votes	%	±%
Liberal	Hyland Fraser	4,649	41.55%	-22.93%
Progressive Conservative	Andrew MacNeil	3,554	31.76%	3.50%
New Democratic	Maurice Smith	2,986	26.69%	19.43%
Total		11,189	–	
Source(s) Source: Nova Scotia Legislature (2024). "Electoral History for Antigonish" (PDF). nslegislature.ca.

=== 1993 ===
1993 Nova Scotia general election
Party	Candidate	Votes	%	±%
Liberal	Bill Gillis	7,292	64.48%	11.24%
Progressive Conservative	Elizabeth Chisholm	3,196	28.26%	-11.31%
New Democratic	Marion MacDonald	821	7.26%	0.07%
Total		11,309	–	
Source(s) Source: Nova Scotia Legislature (2024). "Electoral History for Antigonish" (PDF). nslegislature.ca. Nova Scotia, Chief Electoral Officer (1993). Returns of the General Election for the House of Assembly, Thirty-Third General Election (PDF) (Report). Queen's Printer. Archived from the original (PDF) on June 18, 2018.

=== 1988 ===
1988 Nova Scotia general election
Party	Candidate	Votes	%	±%
Liberal	Bill Gillis	6,004	53.24%	5.46%
Progressive Conservative	Bill Garvie	4,463	39.57%	-5.31%
New Democratic	Bill Woodfine	811	7.19%	-0.14%
Total		11,278	–	
Source(s) Source: Nova Scotia Legislature (2024). "Electoral History for Antigonish" (PDF). nslegislature.ca. Nova Scotia, Chief Electoral Officer (1988). Returns of the General Election for the House of Assembly, Thirty-Second General Election (PDF) (Report). Queen's Printer. Archived from the original (PDF) on July 7, 2018.

=== 1984 ===
1984 Nova Scotia general election
Party	Candidate	Votes	%	±%
Liberal	Bill Gillis	5,167	47.78%	1.31%
Progressive Conservative	Elizabeth Chisholm	4,854	44.89%	0.99%
New Democratic	Bill Woodfine	793	7.33%	-2.30%
Total		10,814	–	
Source(s) Source: Nova Scotia Legislature (2024). "Electoral History for Antigonish" (PDF). nslegislature.ca. Nova Scotia, Chief Electoral Officer (1984). Returns of the General Election for the House of Assembly, Thirty-First General Election (PDF) (Report). Queen's Printer. Archived from the original (PDF) on July 31, 2017.

=== 1981 ===
1981 Nova Scotia general election
Party	Candidate	Votes	%	±%
Liberal	Bill Gillis	4,522	46.47%	-3.34%
Progressive Conservative	Angus MacIsaac	4,271	43.90%	4.45%
New Democratic	John A. Murphy	937	9.63%	-1.10%
Total		9,730	–	
Source(s) Source: Nova Scotia Legislature (2024). "Electoral History for Antigonish" (PDF). nslegislature.ca. Nova Scotia, Chief Electoral Officer (1981). Returns of the General Election for the House of Assembly, Thirtieth General Election (PDF) (Report). Queen's Printer. Archived from the original (PDF) on July 31, 2017.

=== 1978 ===
1978 Nova Scotia general election
Party	Candidate	Votes	%	±%
Liberal	Bill Gillis	4,689	49.82%	-7.06%
Progressive Conservative	Bill MacNeil	3,713	39.45%	4.36%
New Democratic	John Arthur Murphy	1,010	10.73%	2.70%
Total		9,412	–	
Source(s) Source: Nova Scotia Legislature (2024). "Electoral History for Antigonish" (PDF). nslegislature.ca. Nova Scotia, Chief Electoral Officer (1978). Returns of the General Election for the House of Assembly, Twenty-Ninth General Election (PDF) (Report). Queen's Printer. Archived from the original (PDF) on June 18, 2018.

=== 1974 ===
1974 Nova Scotia general election
Party	Candidate	Votes	%	±%
Liberal	Bill Gillis	5,141	56.88%	5.97%
Progressive Conservative	Ronald A. (Ronnie) MacDonald	3,172	35.09%	-10.63%
New Democratic	Patrick D. Gough	726	8.03%	4.66%
Total		9,039	–	
Source(s) Source: Nova Scotia Legislature (2024). "Electoral History for Antigonish" (PDF). nslegislature.ca. Nova Scotia, Chief Electoral Officer (1974). Returns of the General Election for the House of Assembly, Twenty-Eighth General Election (PDF) (Report). Queen's Printer. Archived from the original (PDF) on June 18, 2018.

=== 1970 ===
1970 Nova Scotia general election
Party	Candidate	Votes	%	±%
Liberal	Bill Gillis	4,002	50.91%	1.11%
Progressive Conservative	William Shaw	3,594	45.72%	-4.48%
New Democratic	Alex MacPherson	265	3.37%	–
Total		7,861	–	
Source(s) Source: Nova Scotia Legislature (2024). "Electoral History for Antigonish" (PDF). nslegislature.ca. Nova Scotia, Legislative Assembly (1970). Returns of the General Election for the House of Assembly, 1970 (PDF) (Report). Queen's Printer. Archived from the original (PDF) on July 25, 2018.

=== 1967 ===
1967 Nova Scotia general election
Party	Candidate	Votes	%	±%
Progressive Conservative	William F. MacKinnon	3,222	50.20%	-4.38%
Liberal	Bill Gillis	3,196	49.80%	4.38%
Total		6,418	–	
Source(s) Source: Nova Scotia Legislature (2024). "Electoral History for Antigonish" (PDF). nslegislature.ca. Nova Scotia Legislature (1967). Returns of the General Election for the House of Assembly (PDF) (Report). Queen's Printer. Archived from the original (PDF) on July 25, 2018.

=== 1963 ===
1963 Nova Scotia general election
Party	Candidate	Votes	%	±%
Progressive Conservative	William F. MacKinnon	3,334	54.58%	-0.18%
Liberal	Ronald Saint John Chisholm	2,774	45.42%	2.41%
Total		6,108	–	
Source(s) Source: Nova Scotia Legislature (2024). "Electoral History for Antigonish" (PDF). nslegislature.ca. Nova Scotia Legislature (1963). Returns of the General Election for the House of Assembly (PDF) (Report). Queen's Printer. Archived from the original (PDF) on July 25, 2018.

=== 1960 ===
1960 Nova Scotia general election
Party	Candidate	Votes	%	±%
Progressive Conservative	William F. MacKinnon	3,177	54.77%	2.83%
Liberal	Vincent J. MacDonald	2,495	43.01%	-5.05%
Co-operative Commonwealth	Alex MacPherson	129	2.22%	–
Total		5,801	–	
Source(s) Source: Nova Scotia Legislature (2024). "Electoral History for Antigonish" (PDF). nslegislature.ca. Nova Scotia Legislature (1960). Returns of the General Election for the House of Assembly (PDF) (Report). Queen's Printer. Archived from the original (PDF) on July 25, 2018.

=== 1956 ===
1956 Nova Scotia general election
Party	Candidate	Votes	%	±%
Progressive Conservative	William F. MacKinnon	2,884	51.94%	39.35%
Liberal	Colin H. Chisholm	2,669	48.06%	-0.85%
Total		5,553	–	
Source(s) Source: Nova Scotia Legislature (2024). "Electoral History for Antigonish" (PDF). nslegislature.ca. Nova Scotia Legislature (1956). Returns of the General Election for the House of Assembly (PDF) (Report). Queen's Printer. Archived from the original (PDF) on September 10, 2018.

=== 1953 ===
1953 Nova Scotia general election
Party	Candidate	Votes	%	±%
Liberal	Colin H. Chisholm	2,624	48.92%	-9.32%
Dem	Vincent J. MacDonald	2,065	38.50%	–
Progressive Conservative	Terrance Bernard Thompson	675	12.58%	-29.18%
Total		5,364	–	
Source(s) Source: Nova Scotia Legislature (2024). "Electoral History for Antigonish" (PDF). nslegislature.ca. Nova Scotia Legislature (1953). Returns of the General Election for the House of Assembly (PDF) (Report). Queen's Printer. Archived from the original (PDF) on September 10, 2018.

=== 1949 ===
1949 Nova Scotia general election
Party	Candidate	Votes	%	±%
Liberal	Colin H. Chisholm	3,179	58.23%	-3.60%
Progressive Conservative	Terrance Bernard Thompson	2,280	41.77%	3.60%
Total		5,459	–	
Source(s) Source: Nova Scotia Legislature (2024). "Electoral History for Antigonish" (PDF). nslegislature.ca. Nova Scotia Legislature (1949). Returns of the General Election for the House of Assembly (PDF) (Report). Queen's Printer. Archived from the original (PDF) on September 10, 2018.

=== 1945 ===
1945 Nova Scotia general election
Party	Candidate	Votes	%	±%
Liberal	John Patrick Gorman	2,650	61.83%	-7.60%
Progressive Conservative	Douglas MacDonald	1,636	38.17%	7.60%
Total		4,286	–	
Source(s) Source: Nova Scotia Legislature (2024). "Electoral History for Antigonish" (PDF). nslegislature.ca. Nova Scotia Legislature (1945). Returns of the General Election for the House of Assembly (PDF) (Report). Queen's Printer. Archived from the original (PDF) on September 10, 2018.

=== 1942 by-election ===
Nova Scotia provincial by-election, 1942-10-19
Party	Candidate	Votes	%	±%
Liberal	John Patrick Gorman	2,496	69.43%	7.91%
Progressive Conservative	Russell Cunningham	1,099	30.57%	-7.91%
Total		3,595	–	
Source(s) Source: Nova Scotia Legislature (2024). "Electoral History for Antigonish" (PDF). nslegislature.ca.

=== 1941 ===
1941 Nova Scotia general election
Party	Candidate	Votes	%	±%
Liberal	John A. MacIsaac	2,759	61.52%	0.41%
Progressive Conservative	Michael Ignatius Webb	1,726	38.48%	-0.41%
Total		4,485	–	
Source(s) Source: Nova Scotia Legislature (2024). "Electoral History for Antigonish" (PDF). nslegislature.ca. Nova Scotia Legislature (1941). Returns of the General Election for the House of Assembly (PDF) (Report). Queen's Printer. Archived from the original (PDF) on February 8, 2024.

=== 1937 ===
1937 Nova Scotia general election
Party	Candidate	Votes	%	±%
Liberal	John L. MacIsaac	3,160	61.11%	6.79%
Progressive Conservative	Robert Hamilton Butts	2,011	38.89%	–
Total		5,171	–	
Source(s) Source: Nova Scotia Legislature (2024). "Electoral History for Antigonish" (PDF). nslegislature.ca. Nova Scotia Legislature (1937). Returns of the General Election for the House of Assembly (PDF) (Report). Queen's Printer. Archived from the original (PDF) on March 1, 2019.

=== 1933 ===
1933 Nova Scotia general election
Party	Candidate	Votes	%	±%
Liberal	John L. MacIsaac	2,951	54.32%	-2.24%
Liberal-Conservative	John A. Walker	2,482	45.68%	2.24%
Total		5,433	–	
Source(s) Source: Nova Scotia Legislature (2024). "Electoral History for Antigonish" (PDF). nslegislature.ca. Nova Scotia Legislature (1933). Returns of the General Election for the House of Assembly (PDF) (Report). Queen's Printer. Archived from the original (PDF) on March 1, 2019.

=== 1928 ===
1928 Nova Scotia general election
Party	Candidate	Votes	%	Elected
Liberal	John L. MacIsaac	2,431	28.42%	✓
Liberal	William Chisholm	2,407	28.14%	✓
Liberal-Conservative	John F. McLellan	1,925	22.50%	
Liberal-Conservative	John D. MacIntyre	1,792	20.95%	
Total		8,555	–	
Source(s) Source: Nova Scotia Legislature (2024). "Electoral History for Antigonish" (PDF). nslegislature.ca.

=== 1925 ===
1925 Nova Scotia general election
Party	Candidate	Votes	%	Elected
Liberal	John L. MacIsaac	2,393	27.74%	✓
Liberal	William Chisholm	2,267	26.28%	✓
Liberal-Conservative	Duncan S. Chisholm	2,095	24.29%	
Liberal-Conservative	Frederick R. Irish	1,871	21.69%	
Total		8,626	–	
Source(s) Source: Nova Scotia Legislature (2024). "Electoral History for Antigonish" (PDF). nslegislature.ca.

=== 1923 by-election ===
Nova Scotia provincial by-election, 1923-01-16
Party	Candidate	Votes	%	Elected
Liberal	William Chisholm	Acclaimed	N/A	✓
Total			–	
Source(s) Source: Nova Scotia Legislature (2024). "Electoral History for Antigonish" (PDF). nslegislature.ca.

=== 1920 ===
1920 Nova Scotia general election
Party	Candidate	Votes	%	Elected
Liberal	William Chisholm	2,059	28.23%	✓
United Farmers	Angus J. MacGillivray	1,804	24.73%	✓
Liberal	Alexander Stirling MacMillan	1,725	23.65%	
United Farmers	Frederick R. Irish	1,706	23.39%	
Total		7,294	–	
Source(s) Source: Nova Scotia Legislature (2024). "Electoral History for Antigonish" (PDF). nslegislature.ca.

=== 1916 ===
1916 Nova Scotia general election
Party	Candidate	Votes	%	Elected
Liberal	William Chisholm	1,366	28.54%	✓
Liberal	Fred Robert Trotter	1,300	27.16%	✓
Liberal-Conservative	John Sarsfield O'Brien	1,167	24.38%	
Liberal-Conservative	Allan Macdonald	953	19.91%	
Total		4,786	–	
Source(s) Source: Nova Scotia Legislature (2024). "Electoral History for Antigonish" (PDF). nslegislature.ca.

=== 1913 ===
Nova Scotia provincial by-election, 1913-01-16
Party	Candidate	Votes	%	Elected
Liberal-Conservative	John Sarsfield O'Brien	1,354	56.18%	✓
Liberal	Christopher P. Chisholm	1,056	43.82%	
Total		2,410	–	
Source(s) Source: Nova Scotia Legislature (2024). "Electoral History for Antigonish" (PDF). nslegislature.ca.

=== 1911 ===
1911 Nova Scotia general election
Party	Candidate	Votes	%	Elected
Liberal-Conservative	Edward Lavin Girroir	1,299	27.92%	✓
Liberal	Fred Robert Trotter	1,267	27.24%	✓
Liberal	Christopher P. Chisholm	1,070	23.00%	
Liberal-Conservative	Hugh Macdougall	1,016	21.84%	
Total		4,652	–	
Source(s) Source: Nova Scotia Legislature (2024). "Electoral History for Antigonish" (PDF). nslegislature.ca.

=== 1907 by-election ===
Nova Scotia provincial by-election, 1907-04-09
Party	Candidate	Votes	%	Elected
Liberal	Christopher P. Chisholm	Acclaimed	N/A	✓
Total			–	
Source(s) Source: Nova Scotia Legislature (2024). "Electoral History for Antigonish" (PDF). nslegislature.ca.

=== 1906 ===
1906 Nova Scotia general election
Party	Candidate	Votes	%	Elected
Liberal	Christopher P. Chisholm	Acclaimed	N/A	✓
Liberal	Fred Robert Trotter	Acclaimed	N/A	✓
Total			–	
Source(s) Source: Nova Scotia Legislature (2024). "Electoral History for Antigonish" (PDF). nslegislature.ca.

=== 1903 by-election ===
Nova Scotia provincial by-election, 1903-01-22
Party	Candidate	Votes	%	Elected
Liberal	Fred Robert Trotter	Acclaimed	N/A	✓
Total			–	
Source(s) Source: Nova Scotia Legislature (2024). "Electoral History for Antigonish" (PDF). nslegislature.ca.

=== 1901 ===
1901 Nova Scotia general election
Party	Candidate	Votes	%	Elected
Liberal	Christopher P. Chisholm	Acclaimed	N/A	✓
Liberal	Angus McGillivray	Acclaimed	N/A	✓
Total			–	
Source(s) Source: Nova Scotia Legislature (2024). "Electoral History for Antigonish" (PDF). nslegislature.ca.

=== 1897 ===
1897 Nova Scotia general election
Party	Candidate	Votes	%	Elected
Liberal	Angus McGillivray	1,263	27.77%	✓
Liberal	Christopher P. Chisholm	1,176	25.86%	✓
Liberal-Conservative	Charles B. Whidden	1,123	24.69%	
Liberal-Conservative	Hugh Macdougald	986	21.68%	
Total		4,548	–	
Source(s) Source: Nova Scotia Legislature (2024). "Electoral History for Antigonish" (PDF). nslegislature.ca.

=== 1895 ===
Nova Scotia provincial by-election, 1895-06-13
Party	Candidate	Votes	%	Elected
Liberal	Angus McGillivray	1,314	56.18%	✓
Liberal	D. A. Fraser	1,025	43.82%	
Total		2,339	–	
Source(s) Source: Nova Scotia Legislature (2024). "Electoral History for Antigonish" (PDF). nslegislature.ca.

=== 1894 ===
1894 Nova Scotia general election
Party	Candidate	Votes	%	Elected
Liberal	Colin Francis McIsaac	1,333	27.99%	✓
Liberal	Christopher P. Chisholm	1,225	25.72%	✓
Liberal-Conservative	J. J. Cameron	1,141	23.96%	
Liberal-Conservative	C. Ernest Gregory	1,064	22.34%	
Total		4,763	–	
Source(s) Source: Nova Scotia Legislature (2024). "Electoral History for Antigonish" (PDF). nslegislature.ca.

=== 1891 ===
Nova Scotia provincial by-election, 1891-03-05
Party	Candidate	Votes	%	Elected
Liberal	Christopher P. Chisholm	933	50.46%	✓
Liberal	J. J. Cameron	916	49.54%	
Total		1,849	–	
Source(s) Source: Nova Scotia Legislature (2024). "Electoral History for Antigonish" (PDF). nslegislature.ca.

=== 1890 ===
1890 Nova Scotia general election
Party	Candidate	Votes	%	Elected
Liberal	Angus McGillivray	1,362	30.68%	✓
Liberal	Colin Francis McIsaac	1,274	28.70%	✓
Liberal-Conservative	J. J. Cameron	1,003	22.60%	
Liberal-Conservative	Archibald McPhee	800	18.02%	
Total		4,439	–	
Source(s) Source: Nova Scotia Legislature (2024). "Electoral History for Antigonish" (PDF). nslegislature.ca.

=== 1887 ===
Nova Scotia provincial by-election, 1887-03-08
Party	Candidate	Votes	%	Elected
Liberal	Angus McGillivray	Acclaimed	N/A	✓
Total			–	
Source(s) Source: Nova Scotia Legislature (2024). "Electoral History for Antigonish" (PDF). nslegislature.ca.

=== 1886 ===
1886 Nova Scotia general election
Party	Candidate	Votes	%	Elected
Liberal	Angus McGillivray	1,384	34.30%	✓
Liberal	Colin Francis McIsaac	1,269	31.45%	✓
Liberal-Conservative	Charles B. Whidden	900	22.30%	
Liberal-Conservative	Rod K. McDonald	482	11.95%	
Total		4,035	–	
Source(s) Source: Nova Scotia Legislature (2024). "Electoral History for Antigonish" (PDF). nslegislature.ca.

=== 1882 ===
Nova Scotia provincial by-election, 1882
Party	Candidate	Votes	%	Elected
Liberal-Conservative	Charles Blanchard Whidden	1,026	59.96%	✓
Liberal	C. C. Gregory	685	40.04%	
Total		1,711	–	
Source(s) Source: Nova Scotia Legislature (2024). "Electoral History for Antigonish" (PDF). nslegislature.ca.

=== 1882 ===
1882 Nova Scotia general election
Party	Candidate	Votes	%	Elected
Liberal-Conservative	John Sparrow David Thompson	1,166	25.83%	✓
Liberal	Angus McGillivray	1,094	24.24%	✓
Liberal-Conservative	Charles B. Whidden	1,026	22.73%	
Liberal	C. C. Gregory	685	15.18%	
Liberal	Joseph McDonald	543	12.03%	
Total		4,514	–	
Source(s) Source: Nova Scotia Legislature (2024). "Electoral History for Antigonish" (PDF). nslegislature.ca.

=== 1878 ===
1878 Nova Scotia general election
Party	Candidate	Votes	%	Elected
Liberal	Angus McGillivray	Acclaimed	N/A	✓
Liberal-Conservative	John Sparrow David Thompson	Acclaimed	N/A	✓
Total			–	
Source(s) Source: Nova Scotia Legislature (2024). "Electoral History for Antigonish" (PDF). nslegislature.ca.

=== 1877 by-election ===
Nova Scotia provincial by-election, 1877
Party	Candidate	Votes	%	Elected
Liberal-Conservative	John Sparrow David Thompson	Acclaimed	N/A	✓
Total			–	
Source(s) Source: Nova Scotia Legislature (2024). "Electoral History for Antigonish" (PDF). nslegislature.ca.

=== 1874 ===
1874 Nova Scotia general election
Party	Candidate	Votes	%	Elected
Liberal-Conservative	John J. McKinnon	1,012	41.73%	✓
Liberal	Daniel McDonald	752	31.01%	✓
Liberal	Joseph MacDonald	661	27.26%	
Total		2,425	–	
Source(s) Source: Nova Scotia Legislature (2024). "Electoral History for Antigonish" (PDF). nslegislature.ca.

=== 1873 by-election ===
Nova Scotia provincial by-election, 1873
Party	Candidate	Votes	%	Elected
Liberal	Daniel McDonald	acclaimed	N/A	✓
Total			–	
Source(s) Source: Nova Scotia Legislature (2024). "Electoral History for Antigonish" (PDF). nslegislature.ca.

=== 1871 ===
1871 Nova Scotia general election
Party	Candidate	Votes	%	Elected
Liberal	Daniel McDonald	1,052	30.62%	✓
Liberal	Joseph MacDonald	978	28.46%	✓
Liberal-Conservative	R. N. Henry	853	24.83%	
Liberal-Conservative	Angus McGillivray	553	16.09%	
Total		3,436	–	
Source(s) Source: Nova Scotia Legislature (2024). "Electoral History for Antigonish" (PDF). nslegislature.ca.

=== 1867 ===
1867 Nova Scotia general election
Party	Candidate	Votes	%	Elected
Anti-Confederation	Daniel McDonald	1,424	45.95%	✓
Anti-Confederation	Joseph MacDonald	1,072	34.59%	✓
Confederation	R. N. Henry	410	13.23%	
Confederation	J. Macdonald	193	6.23%	
Total		3,099	–	
Source(s) Source: Nova Scotia Legislature (2024). "Electoral History for Antigonish" (PDF). nslegislature.ca.

== See also ==
- List of Nova Scotia provincial electoral districts
- Canadian provincial electoral districts
