= Antigonish (federal electoral district) =

Former federal electoral district in Nova Scotia, Canada

Nova Scotia electoral district

Defunct federal electoral district
- Legislature: House of Commons
- District created: 1867
- District abolished: 1914
- First contested: 1867
- Last contested: 1911

Demographics
- Census division: Antigonish

Antigonish was a federal electoral district in Nova Scotia, Canada, that was represented in the House of Commons of Canada from 1867 to 1917. It was created in the British North America Act, 1867. The federal riding was dissolved in 1914 into the riding of Antigonish—Guysborough. It consisted of the County of Antigonish.

== Geography ==
This riding was set by the British North America Act, 1867 to consist of Antigonish County. The boundaries were not changed during the electoral redistributions of 1872, 1882, 1892 or 1903. This riding was dissolved into Antigonish—Guysborough during the 1914 redistribution. The county was legally defined in 1828 (as Sydney County) as: Commencing at a slate rock, on the Eastern side of the falls of the River Ekimsegam, and at a post and pile of stones marked on the west side CH on the Eastern side CS from thence running North twenty five miles and a quarter of a mile to a square post surrounded by a pile of stones marked SC on the east and HC on the west side from thence running south eighty five degrees, east fourteen miles to a square post and pile of stones marked CS on the Eastern side and CH on the western side, thence running north twenty six miles to the shore of the Gulf of St. Lawrence to a square post surrounded by a pile of stones and marked on the east side CS on the west side CH thence easterly along the shore to the entrance of the Gut of Canso, and by a line drawn through the centre of said Gut southerly to the southern entrance of the same, thence westerly and southerly along the shores of Chedabucto Bay, and easterly along the shore of said bay, and westerly by the southern shore of the province, to Ekimsegum aforenamed comprehending all the Islands in front of the foregoing limits save the Island of Cape Breton, and its appendant Isles.

== Members of Parliament ==
Antigonish
Parliament	Years	Member	Party
1st	1867–1869 (Note: The Anti-Confederation Party dissolved in 1869, and Hugh McDonald joined the Liberal–Conservative Party.)	Hugh McDonald	Anti-Confederation
1st	1869–1872	Hugh McDonald	Liberal–Conservative
2nd	1872–1873 (Note: A by-election was called on Hugh McDonald being appointed Minister of Militia and Defence, 1 July 1873. He was acclaimed as the by-election victor on 7 July 1873.)	Hugh McDonald	Liberal–Conservative
2nd	1873–1873 (Note: Hugh McDonald was appointed Puisne Judge of the Supreme Court of Nova Scotia on 5 November 1873. His successor was elected in a by-election on 20 December 1873.)	Hugh McDonald	Liberal–Conservative
2nd	1873–1874	Angus McIsaac	Liberal
3rd	1874–1878	Angus McIsaac	Liberal
4th	1878–1882	Angus McIsaac	Liberal
5th	1882–1885 (Note: Angus McIsaac was appointed as County Court Judge for District No. 6 on 24 September 1885. His successor was elected in a by-election on 16 October 1885.)	Angus McIsaac	Liberal
5th	1885–1887	John Sparrow David Thompson	Liberal–Conservative
6th	1887–1891	John Sparrow David Thompson	Liberal–Conservative
7th	1891–1894 (Note: John Sparrow David Thompson died in office on 12 December 1894. His successor was elected in a by-election on 17 April 1895.)	John Sparrow David Thompson	Liberal–Conservative
7th	1895–1896	Colin Francis McIsaac	Liberal
8th	1896–1900	Colin Francis McIsaac	Liberal
9th	1900–1904	Colin Francis McIsaac	Liberal
10th	1904–1905 (Note: Colin Francis McIsaac was appointed as Railway Commissioner on 3 July 1905. His successor was elected in a by-election on 22 November 1905.)	Colin Francis McIsaac	Liberal
10th	1905–1908	William Chisholm	Liberal
11th	1908–1911	William Chisholm	Liberal
12th	1911–1917	William Chisholm	Liberal
Riding dissolved into Antigonish—Guysborough (1917–1968)

== Election results ==
=== 1911 ===
1911 Canadian federal election
Party	Candidate	Votes	%	±%
Liberal	William Chisholm	1,468	59.80	+9.41
Conservative	John J. Cameron	987	40.20	-9.41
Total valid votes		2,455	–	
Source: Library of Parliament

=== 1908 ===
1908 Canadian federal election
Party	Candidate	Votes	%	±%
Liberal	William Chisholm	1,291	50.39	-16.26
Conservative	Edward Lavin Girroir	1,271	49.61	+16.26
Total valid votes		2,562	–	
Source: Library of Parliament

=== 1905 by-election ===
Canadian federal by-election, 22 November 1905 On Colin Francis McIsaac being appointed Railway Commissioner, 3 July 1905
Party	Candidate	Votes	%
Liberal	William Chisholm	1,325	54.87
Conservative	Edward Lavin Girroir	1,090	45.13
Total valid votes		2,415	–

=== 1904 ===
1904 Canadian federal election
Party	Candidate	Votes	%	±%
Liberal	Colin Francis McIsaac	1,619	66.65	+11.42
Conservative	Hugh Cameron	810	33.35	-11.42
Total valid votes		2,429	–	
Source: Library of Parliament

=== 1900 ===
1900 Canadian federal election
Party	Candidate	Votes	%	±%
Liberal	Colin Francis McIsaac	1,403	55.24	+2.96
Conservative	Edward Lavin Girroir	1,137	44.76	-2.96
Total valid votes		2,540	–	
Source: Library of Parliament

=== 1896 ===
1896 Canadian federal election
Party	Candidate	Votes	%	±%
Liberal	Colin Francis McIsaac	1,341	52.28	–
Conservative	J.A. Chisholm	1,224	47.72	-6.88
Total valid votes		2,565	–	
Source: Library of Parliament

=== 1895 by-election ===
Canadian federal by-election, 17 April 1895 On John Sparrow David Thompson's death, 12 December 1894
Party	Candidate	Votes
Liberal	Colin Francis McIsaac	acclaimed

=== 1891 ===
1891 Canadian federal election
Party	Candidate	Votes	%	±%
Liberal–Conservative	John Sparrow David Thompson	1,346	54.60	+3.79
Unknown	Angus McGillivray	1,119	45.40	-3.79
Total valid votes		2,465	–	
Source: Library of Parliament

=== 1887 ===
1887 Canadian federal election
Party	Candidate	Votes	%	±%
Liberal–Conservative	John Sparrow David Thompson	1,247	50.81	+10.05
Liberal	Angus McGillivray	1,207	49.19	-10.05
Total valid votes		2,454	–	
Source: Library of Parliament

=== 1885 by-election ===
Canadian federal by-election, 16 October 1885 On Angus McIsaac being appointed County Court Judge for District No. 6, 24 September 1885
Party	Candidate	Votes	%
Liberal–Conservative	John Sparrow David Thompson	1,020	56.29
Independent Conservative	Alexander McIntosh	792	43.71
Total valid votes		1,812	–
Source: Library of Parliament

=== 1882 ===
1882 Canadian federal election
Party	Candidate	Votes	%	±%
Liberal	Angus McIsaac	1,068	59.23	+14.21
Unknown	Charles B. Whidden	735	40.77	-14.21
Total valid votes		1,803	–	
Source: Library of Parliament

=== 1878 ===
1878 Canadian federal election
Party	Candidate	Votes	%	±%
Liberal	Angus McIsaac	833	45.03	–
Unknown	Charles B. Whidden	702	37.95	–
Unknown	John McKinnon	315	17.03	–
Total valid votes		1,850	–	
Source: Library of Parliament

=== 1874 ===
1874 Canadian federal election
Party	Candidate	Votes	%
Liberal	Angus McIsaac	acclaimed	
Total valid votes			–
Source: Library of Parliament

=== 1873 by-election ===
Canadian federal by-election, 20 December 1873 On Hugh McDonald being appointed Puisne Judge of the Supreme Court of Nova Scotia, 5 November 1873
Party	Candidate	Votes
Liberal	Angus McIsaac	acclaimed

=== 1873 by-election ===
Canadian federal by-election, 7 July 1873 On Hugh McDonald being appointed Minister of Militia and Defence, 1 July 1873
Party	Candidate	Votes
Liberal–Conservative	Hugh McDonald	acclaimed

=== 1872 ===
1872 Canadian federal election
Party	Candidate	Votes	%
Liberal–Conservative	Hugh McDonald	acclaimed	
Total valid votes			–
Source: Library of Parliament

=== 1867 ===
1867 Canadian federal election
Party	Candidate	Votes	%
Anti-Confederation	Hugh McDonald	1,238	76.04
Conservative	William Alexander Henry	390	23.96
Total valid votes		1,628	–
This electoral district was created by the British North America Act, 1867 from the colonial Province of Nova Scotia's Antigonish electoral district. William Alexander Henry was one of the incumbents, along with John McKinnon.
Source: Library of Parliament

== See also ==
- List of Canadian electoral districts
- Historical federal electoral districts of Canada
