= McIsaac =

McIsaac is a surname. Notable people with the surname include:

- Alan McIsaac (born 1954), Canadian politician
- Angus McIsaac (1842–1902), Canadian politician
- Billy McIsaac (born 1949), Scottish musician
- Cliff McIsaac (1930–2006), Canadian politician
- Colin Francis McIsaac (1854–1927), Canadian politician
- Hazel McIsaac (1933–2012), Canadian politician
- Hilary McIsaac (1820–1901), Canadian politician
- James McIsaac (1854–1927), Canadian politician
- John L. McIsaac (1870–1941), Canadian politician
- Justin McIsaac (born 1978), American wrestler
- Shona McIsaac (born 1960), Scottish politician
- Tai McIsaac (born 1975), Australian rugby union player
