= Mount Hope Catholic Cemetery =

Cemetery in Toronto, Ontario, Canada

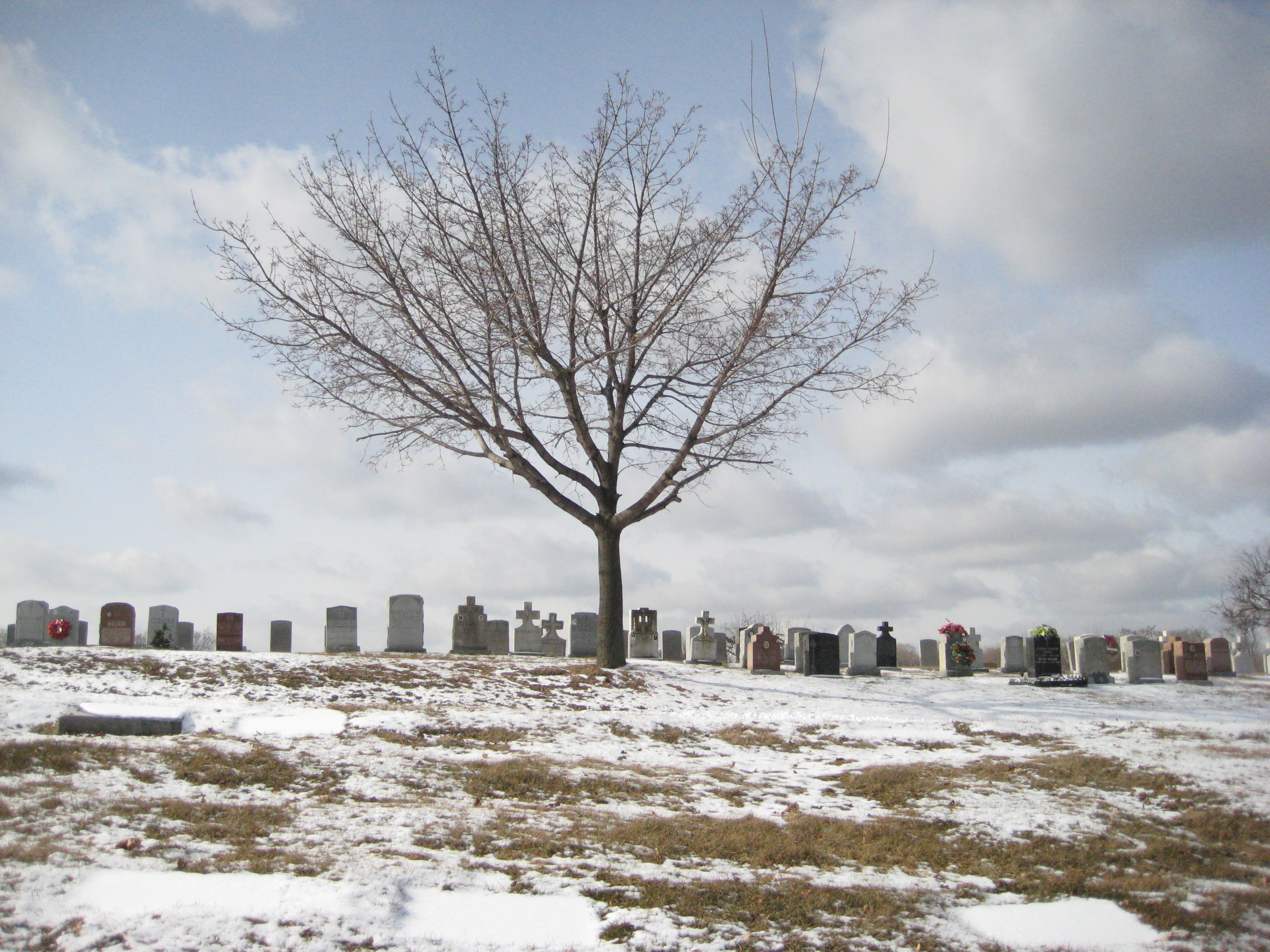
- Mount Hope Catholic Cemetery
- Interactive map of Mount Hope Catholic Cemetery

Details
- Established: 1900
- Location: 305 Erskine Avenue, Toronto, Ontario
- Country: Canada
- Coordinates: 43.7151°N 79.3826°W
- Type: Catholic
- No. of interments: 76,000
- Website: catholic-cemeteries.ca
- Find a Grave: Mount Hope Catholic Cemetery

Mount Hope Catholic Cemetery is a Catholic cemetery at 305 Erskine Avenue in Toronto, Ontario, Canada.

== History ==
Mount Hope was created near the end of the 19th Century when the Archdiocese of Toronto was faced with a capacity issue at St. Michael's Cemetery. Land was found further north of Toronto and Mount Hope was consecrated on July 9, 1898, by Catholic Archbishop John Walsh. The first burial occurred on March 27, 1900. Within 50 years, Mount Hope was facing a capacity issue and in 1954 Holy Cross Cemetery, Thornhill, Ontario, opened to ease the burden on Mount Hope. With additional land added next to the property, Burke Brook Ravine was buried as storm sewer in 1960 (the ravine exists northeast of the cemetery through Sunnydene Park).

The cemetery contains the graves of 147 Commonwealth service personnel from both World Wars, registered by the Commonwealth War Graves Commission.

For the cemetery's centennial, the Catholic Cemeteries Archdiocese of Toronto published A History of Mount Hope Cemetery Toronto Ontario 1898 to 1998 written by Michael Power.

By the end of the 20th century, the cemetery was full, holding the remains of more than 76,000 persons. However, a columbarium was built to house the remains of those who had been cremated.

== Notable burials ==
Some of the notables interred here are:

- Margaret Anglin (1876–1958), stage actress
- Timothy Warren Anglin (1822–1896), newspaper editor, politician
- Morley Callaghan (1903–1990), writer
- Francis "King" Clancy (1903–1986), Hall of Fame ice hockey player and coach
- Cal Gardner (1924–2001), NHL ice hockey player
- Arthur W. Holmes (1865–1944), architect
- Louis Quilico (1925–2000), opera baritone
- Reginald "Hooley" Smith (1903–1963) Hall of Fame ice hockey player
- Frederick Albert Tilston (1906–1992), Victoria Cross recipient
- Jean Wilson (1910–1933), Olympic speed-skating gold medalist
- William R. Allen (1919–1985), 2nd Chairman of Metropolitan Toronto, namesake of the Allen Expressway
- Denis T. O'Connor (1841–1911) Catholic Archbishop of Toronto
- Frank Tunney (1912–1983), wrestling promoter
- Annie Thompson (1845–1913), wife of former Prime Minister John Thompson
