= Hugh McDonald (MP) =

Canadian politician

The Honourable Hugh McDonald PC
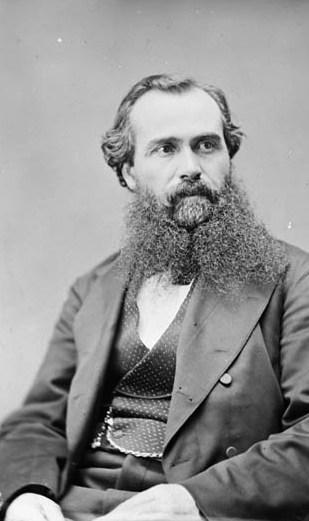

Member of the Canadian Parliament for Antigonish
- In office 1867–1873
- Succeeded by: Angus McIsaac

Personal details
- Born: May 4, 1827 South River, Nova Scotia
- Died: February 28, 1899 (aged 71) Antigonish, Nova Scotia
- Party: Anti-Confederate (1867-1869); Liberal-Conservative (1869-1873)
- Spouse: Sarah Smith
- Cabinet: President of the Privy Council (1873); Minister of Militia and Defence (1873)

Hugh Macdonald, PC (May 4, 1827 – February 28, 1899) was a lawyer, judge and member of the First Canadian Parliament. He represented the Antigonish riding of Nova Scotia, from 1867 to 1869, along with William Hallett Ray, as an Anti-Confederate and, from 1869 to 1873, as a Liberal-Conservative.

The son of Allan MacDonald and Christina Cameron, he was educated at Saint Francis Xavier University and called to the Nova Scotia bar in 1855. McDonald married Sarah Smith in 1856. He practiced law in Antigonish, Nova Scotia. McDonald represented Antigonish County in the Legislative Assembly of Nova Scotia from 1859 to 1863. In 1872, he was named Queen's Counsel.

MacDonald served as President of the Queen's Privy Council for Canada and Minister of Militia and Defense in 1873. Later that year, he resigned his seat in parliament to accept an appointment to the Nova Scotia Supreme Court.

McDonald served as puisne judge in the Supreme Court from November 1873 until he retired from the bench in 1893.

== Election results ==
By-election on July 7, 1873 On Mr. McDonald being appointed Minister of Militia and Defence, July 1, 1873
Party	Candidate	Votes
Liberal–Conservative	Hugh McDonald	acclaimed

1872 Canadian federal election
Party	Candidate	Votes
Liberal–Conservative	Hugh McDonald	acclaimed

1867 Canadian federal election: Antigonish
Party	Candidate	Votes	%
Anti-Confederation	Hugh McDonald	1,238	76.04
Conservative	William Alexander Henry	390	23.96
Total valid votes		1,628	–
This electoral district was created by the British North America Act, 1867 from the colonial Province of Nova Scotia's Antigonish electoral district. William Alexander Henry was one of the incumbents, along with John McKinnon.
Source: Library of Parliament
