= John MacIsaac =

John MacIsaac may refer to:

- John A. MacIsaac (1883–1942), member of the Nova Scotia House of Assembly
- John L. MacIsaac (1870–1941), member of the Nova Scotia House of Assembly
- John MacIsaac (sprinter) (born 1937), Scottish 440 yards runner
