= Angus Ronald Macdonald =

Canadian politician

Angus Macdonald

Member of Parliament for Antigonish—Guysborough
- In office June 1957 – February 1958
- Preceded by: J. Ralph Kirk
- Succeeded by: Clement O'Leary

Personal details
- Born: Angus Ronald Macdonald; 1901 Frasers Mills, Nova Scotia, Canada
- Died: 2 May 1970 (age c. 69)
- Party: Progressive Conservative
- Profession: retail merchant

Angus Ronald Macdonald (1901–2 May 1970) was a Canadian businessman and politician. Macdonald was a Progressive Conservative party member of the House of Commons of Canada. He was born in Frasers Mills, Nova Scotia and became a retail merchant by career.

He was first elected at the Antigonish—Guysborough riding in the 1957 general election. After serving his only federal term, the 23rd Canadian Parliament, Macdonald left federal politics and did not seek re-election.

1957 Canadian federal election: Antigonish—Guysborough
Party	Candidate	Votes
Progressive Conservative	Angus Ronald MacDonald	6,053
Liberal	J. Ralph Kirk	5,856
