= Delorey =

Delorey is a surname. Notable people with the surname include:

- Paul Delorey (1949–2021), Canadian curler and politician
- Randy Delorey (born 1978), Canadian politician
