= Lady Thompson =

Lady Thompson may refer to:

- Annie Thompson (née Affleck) (1845–1913), wife of the Prime Minister of Canada
- Ann Thompson (née Potts) (1869–1946), wife of Luke Thompson (politician)
- Kate Fanny Thompson (1825–1904), married name of English composer Kate Loder
- Lady Gwen Thompson, pseudonym of author Phyllis Thompson (née Healy) (1928–1986)
