= J. Ralph Kirk =

Canadian politician

Member of Parliament for Antigonish—Guysborough
- In office March 1936 – June 1957
- Preceded by: William Duff
- Succeeded by: Angus Ronald Macdonald

Personal details
- Born: James Ralph Kirk; 14 November 1895 Antigonish, Nova Scotia, Canada
- Died: 6 November 1963 (aged 67)
- Party: Liberal
- Profession: merchant

James Ralph Kirk (14 November 1895 – 6 November 1963) was a Liberal party member of the House of Commons of Canada. He was born in Antigonish, Nova Scotia and became a merchant by career.

Kirk was first elected to Parliament at the Antigonish—Guysborough riding in a by-election on 16 March 1936 then re-elected for full terms there in 1940, 1945, 1949 and 1953. Kirk was defeated in the 1957 election by Angus Ronald Macdonald of the Progressive Conservative party.
