= Antigonish—Guysborough =

Former federal electoral district in Nova Scotia, Canada

Nova Scotia electoral district

Defunct federal electoral district
- Legislature: House of Commons
- District created: 1914
- District abolished: 1966
- First contested: 1917
- Last contested: 1965

Antigonish—Guysborough was a federal electoral district in Nova Scotia, Canada, that was represented in the House of Commons of Canada from 1917 to 1968.

This riding was created in 1914 and combined the former ridings of Antigonish and Guysborough. Antigonish—Guysborough was abolished under redistribution in 1966 forming parts of Cape Breton Highlands—Canso and Central Nova.

== Members of Parliament ==
This riding has elected the following members of Parliament:

Parliament	Years	Member	Party
Antigonish—Guysborough; Riding created from Antigonish and Guysborough
13th	1917–1921	John Howard Sinclair	Opposition (Laurier Liberals)
14th	1921–1925	Colin Francis McIsaac	Liberal
15th	1925–1926	Edward Mortimer Macdonald	Liberal
16th	1926–1926	John Carey Douglas	Conservative
16th	1927–1930	William Duff	Liberal
17th	1930–1935	William Duff	Liberal
18th	1935–1936	William Duff	Liberal
18th	1936–1940	J. Ralph Kirk	Liberal
19th	1940–1945	J. Ralph Kirk	Liberal
20th	1945–1949	J. Ralph Kirk	Liberal
21st	1948–1953	J. Ralph Kirk	Liberal
22nd	1953–1957	J. Ralph Kirk	Liberal
23rd	1957–1958	Angus Ronald Macdonald	Progressive Conservative
24th	1958–1962	Clement O'Leary	Progressive Conservative
25th	1962–1963	John Benjamin Stewart	Liberal
26th	1963–1965	John Benjamin Stewart	Liberal
27th	1965–1968	John Benjamin Stewart	Liberal
Riding dissolved into Cape Breton Highlands—Canso and Central Nova

== Election results ==
1917 Canadian federal election
Party	Candidate	Votes
Opposition (Laurier Liberals)	John Howard Sinclair	3,944
Government (Unionist)	William Alexander Wells	2,506

1921 Canadian federal election
Party	Candidate	Votes
Liberal	Colin Francis McIsaac	6,752
Progressive Conservative	Walter McNeil	3,356
Progressive	Daniel McIsaac	1,553

1925 Canadian federal election
Party	Candidate	Votes
Liberal	Edward Mortimer Macdonald	6,135
Conservative	Duncan Stewart Chisholm	5,545

1926 Canadian federal election
Party	Candidate	Votes
Progressive Conservative	John Carey Douglas	6,140
Liberal	Colin Francis McIsaac	6,003

By-election on 18 January 1927; On the death of John Carey Douglas, 10 December 1926
Party	Candidate	Votes
Liberal	William Duff	6,415
Conservative	Neil Romuald McArthur	5,292

1926 Canadian federal election
Party	Candidate	Votes
Progressive Conservative	John Carey Douglas	6,140
Liberal	Colin Francis McIsaac	6,003
Source: lop.parl.ca

1935 Canadian federal election
Party	Candidate	Votes
Liberal	William Duff	7,779
Reconstruction	John Howard MacKichan	3,783

By-election on 16 March 1936; On William Duff being named to the Senate, 28 February 1936
Party	Candidate	Votes
Liberal	J. Ralph Kirk	acclaimed

1940 Canadian federal election
Party	Candidate	Votes
Liberal	J. Ralph Kirk	7,281
National Government	William Edward Landry	4,610

1945 Canadian federal election
Party	Candidate	Votes
Liberal	J. Ralph Kirk	6,379
Progressive Conservative	John Douglas Macdonald	3,483
Co-operative Commonwealth	Cyrus MacLellan	791

1949 Canadian federal election
Party	Candidate	Votes
Liberal	J. Ralph Kirk	7,586
Progressive Conservative	John Archibald Walker	4,385

1953 Canadian federal election
Party	Candidate	Votes
Liberal	J. Ralph Kirk	6,884
Progressive Conservative	Grant McDonald	3,395

1957 Canadian federal election
Party	Candidate	Votes
Progressive Conservative	Angus Ronald MacDonald	6,053
Liberal	J. Ralph Kirk	5,856

1958 Canadian federal election
Party	Candidate	Votes
Progressive Conservative	Clement O'Leary	6,758
Liberal	Alasdair Graham	5,827

1962 Canadian federal election
Party	Candidate	Votes
Liberal	John B. Stewart	6,296
Progressive Conservative	Clement O'Leary	6,183
New Democratic	John Hugh Campbell	208
Social Credit	Alexander James Malloy	104

1963 Canadian federal election
Party	Candidate	Votes
Liberal	John B. Stewart	6,947
Progressive Conservative	Jack Forbes	5,835

1965 Canadian federal election
Party	Candidate	Votes
Liberal	John B. Stewart	6,210
Progressive Conservative	D. Hugh Gillis	6,163
New Democratic	Leslie Myers	228

== See also ==
- List of Canadian electoral districts
- Historical federal electoral districts of Canada
