= Bill Gillis =

Canadian politician (1936–2009)

The Honourable Bill Gillis
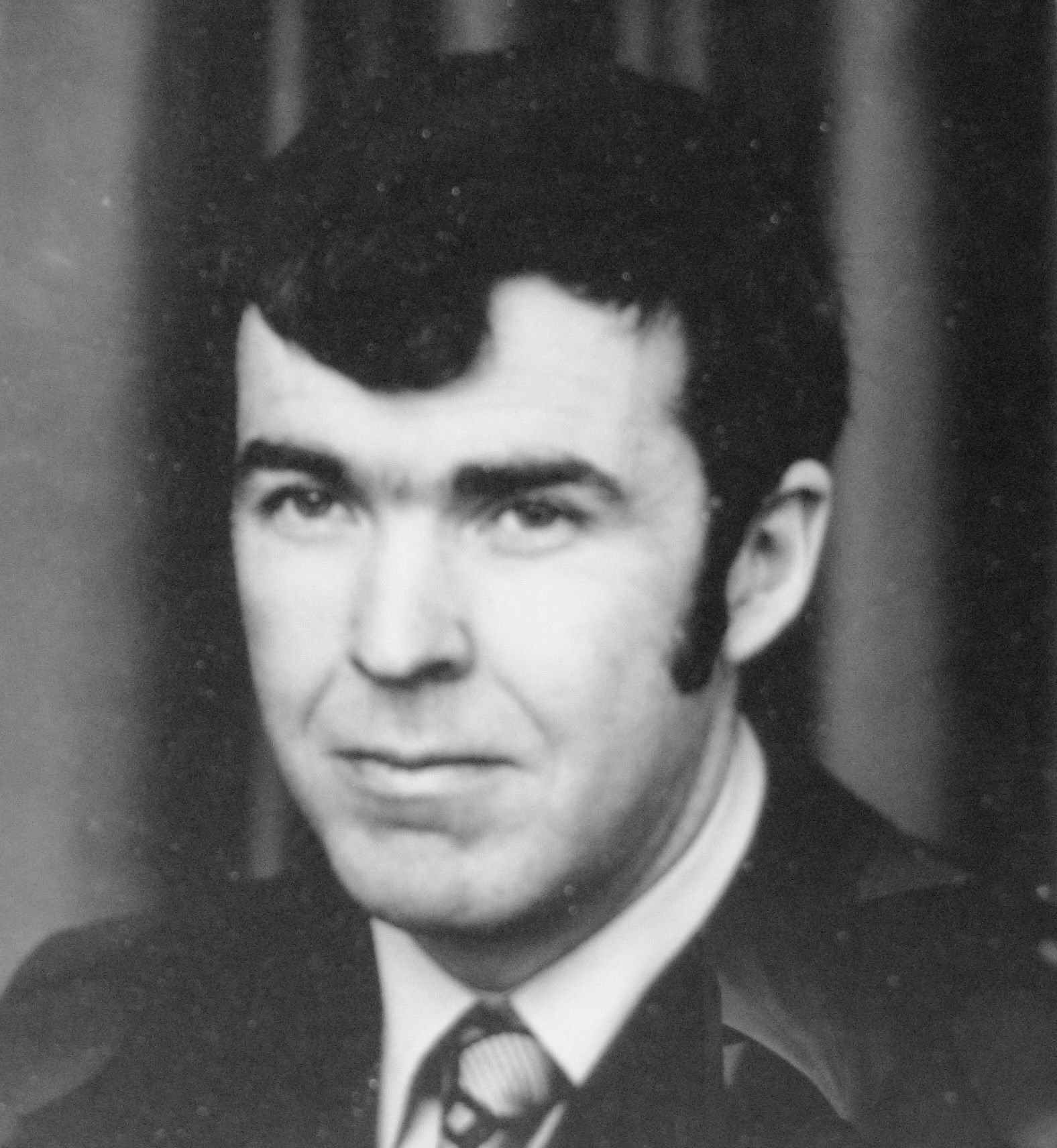
- Gillis, c. 1973

MLA for Antigonish
- In office 1970–1998
- Preceded by: William F. MacKinnon
- Succeeded by: Hyland Fraser

Minister of Finance
- In office June 27, 1996 – April 8, 1998
- Preceded by: Bernie Boudreau
- Succeeded by: Don Downe

Personal details
- Born: October 31, 1936 Boston, Massachusetts
- Died: August 15, 2009 (aged 72) Antigonish, Nova Scotia
- Party: Liberal
- Occupation: Geologist

John William Gillis (October 31, 1936 – August 15, 2009), generally known as Bill Gillis, was a Canadian politician who served in the Nova Scotia House of Assembly from 1970 to 1998. He represented the electoral district of Antigonish for the Liberals.

== Early life ==
Born in Boston, Massachusetts, his family moved to Antigonish when he was six weeks old. Gillis was a graduate of St. Francis Xavier University, and held a doctorate in geology from Pennsylvania State University. Gillis was employed as a geologist with the Canadian Department of Energy, Mines and Resources from 1962 to 1967. He taught geology at St. Francis Xavier University in Antigonish, Nova Scotia from 1967 to 1970.

== Political career ==
Gillis first attempted to enter provincial politics in the 1967 election, but lost to Progressive Conservative William F. MacKinnon by 26 votes. He ran again in the 1970 election and defeated Progressive Conservative William Shaw by 408 votes to win the Antigonish riding. On October 28, 1970, he was appointed by Premier Gerald Regan to the Executive Council of Nova Scotia as Minister of Agriculture and Marketing, and Minister of Municipal Affairs. He was named Minister of Welfare in September 1972, and was shuffled to Minister of Education in August 1973. Gillis was re-elected in the 1974 election, and remained as Minister of Education until February 1976 when he became Minister of Mines.

Gillis was re-elected in the 1978 election, but the Liberals were defeated and he moved to the opposition benches for the next 15 years. During his years in opposition, Gillis was re-elected in the 1981, 1984, and 1988 elections.

In the 1993 election, the Liberals led by John Savage won a majority government, and Gillis was re-elected in his riding by over 4,000 votes. On June 11, 1993, Savage appointed Gillis to cabinet as Deputy Premier and Minister of Justice, becoming the first non-lawyer in the province's history to hold the justice job. Gillis remained as Minister of Justice until June 26, 1996, when he became Minister of Finance, while being retained as Deputy Premier, the two jobs he continued to hold after Russell MacLellan took over as premier in July 1997. Gillis did not reoffer in the 1998 election.

== Death ==
Gillis died on August 15, 2009, as a result of brain cancer.
