= John Sparrow David Thompson =

Prime Minister of Canada from 1892 to 1894

The Right Honourable Sir John Sparrow David Thompson PC KCMG QC
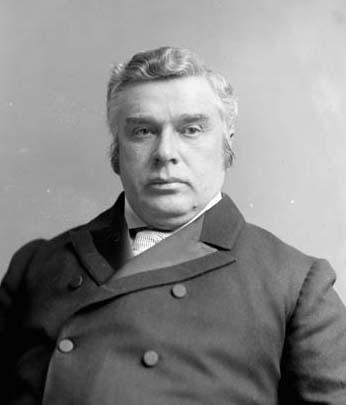
- Thompson in 1893

4th Prime Minister of Canada
- In office December 5, 1892 – December 12, 1894
- Monarch: Victoria
- Governors General: The Lord Stanley of Preston; The Earl of Aberdeen
- Preceded by: John Abbott
- Succeeded by: Mackenzie Bowell

5th Premier of Nova Scotia
- In office May 25, 1882 – July 18, 1882
- Monarch: Victoria
- Lieutenant Governor: Adams George Archibald
- Preceded by: Simon Hugh Holmes
- Succeeded by: William Thomas Pipes

Member of Parliament for Antigonish
- In office October 16, 1885 – December 12, 1894
- Preceded by: Angus McIsaac
- Succeeded by: Colin Francis McIsaac

Member of the Nova Scotia House of Assembly for Antigonish County
- In office December 4, 1877 – July 27, 1882 Serving with Daniel MacDonald, Angus McGillivray
- Preceded by: John J. McKinnon
- Succeeded by: Charles B. Whidden

Personal details
- Born: November 10, 1845 Halifax, Nova Scotia
- Died: December 12, 1894 (aged 49) Windsor, Berkshire, England
- Cause of death: Heart attack
- Resting place: Holy Cross Cemetery, Halifax
- Party: Conservative
- Spouse: Annie Affleck (m. 1870)
- Children: 9

Sir John Sparrow David Thompson (November 10, 1845 – December 12, 1894) was the fourth prime minister of Canada, serving from 1892 until his death in 1894. He had previously been fifth premier of Nova Scotia for a brief period in 1882. He is the only post-Confederation provincial premier to become prime minister, as of 2026.

Thompson was born in Halifax, Nova Scotia. He trained as a lawyer and was called to the bar in 1865. Thompson was elected to the Nova Scotia House of Assembly in 1877 as a representative of the Conservative Party. He became the provincial attorney general the following year, in Simon Holmes's government, and replaced Holmes as premier in 1882. However, he served for only two months before losing the 1882 general election to the Liberal Party. After losing the premiership, he accepted an appointment to the Nova Scotia Supreme Court.

In 1885, Thompson entered federal politics at the personal request of Prime Minister John A. Macdonald, becoming Minister of Justice. In that role he was the driving force behind the enactment of the Criminal Code. Thompson became prime minister in 1892, following the retirement of John Abbott. He was the first Roman Catholic to hold the position. On a trip to England in 1894, Thompson unexpectedly suffered a heart attack and died, aged 49. He is only the second Canadian prime minister to have died in office, after John A. Macdonald.

== Early years ==
Born in Halifax, Nova Scotia, to John Sparrow Thompson and Charlotte Pottinger, he was of Irish and Scottish descent. Some sources say he was born on November 10, 1845, though others say 1844. Thompson married Annie Affleck (1842–1913) in 1870. Annie Thompson was strong-willed and had the same kind of spirit that had driven Agnes Macdonald (another prime minister's wife) to ride the cowcatcher of a Canadian Pacific Railway train through the British Columbia mountains. During their courtship, Thompson was forced to write love letters in shorthand because of his soon-to-be wife's disapproving parents. A daughter, Annie, died at 1, while youngest son David lived to be 2; two other children also died at birth, with five children surviving to adulthood.

== Law, politics, and professorship ==
Thompson was called to the Nova Scotia Bar in July 1865, and from 1878 to 1882, he served as attorney general in the provincial government of Simon H. Holmes. He briefly held the office of Nova Scotia premier in 1882, but his government was defeated in that year's election. Thompson was always a reluctant politician.

After his resignation from government, Thompson was immediately appointed to the Nova Scotia Supreme Court by the prime minister, Macdonald. In this role, he was instrumental in founding the Dalhousie Law School in 1883. He taught law courses at Dalhousie in its early years.

== Federal Minister of Justice ==
After several failed overtures, Macdonald finally recruited Thompson to Ottawa in 1885. Macdonald generally thought highly of Thompson, remarking, "My one great discovery was my discovery of Thompson". Macdonald poked some fun at his recruit as well: "Thompson is a little too fond of satire, and a little too much of a Nova Scotian." However, his rise in government was probably because of the influence of Lady Aberdeen, the wife of Governor General Aberdeen and Macdonald's mentoring. She had great admiration for Thompson and wrote frequently about him in her "Canadian Journal".

Thompson was sworn in as Minister of Justice in September 1885 and won a seat in Parliament in October, representing Antigonish. In 1888, Thompson considered becoming a justice of the Supreme Court of Canada, but decided against moving from the Minister of Justice, and Macdonald was also unwilling to part with Thompson, one of his strongest ministers.

Thompson's most enduring legacy is the drafting and in 1892 the enactment of the first comprehensive Criminal Code. It remains the main consolidation and unification of the criminal law for Canada. As Minister of Justice before and during his premiership, he was the driving force behind this project. The Criminal Code provided a clear, standardized set of laws for the entire country, replacing a patchwork of statutes and common law, and remains a foundational element of Canadian law today.

=== Louis Riel crisis ===
When he returned to Ottawa, the Louis Riel crisis was in full swing. The question of what to do with Riel, who had been sentenced to hang for leading the 1885 North-West Rebellion, was now Thompson's responsibility. Although Thompson was ill with kidney stones at the time of Riel's execution, Thompson made his first major speech to Parliament during the subsequent debate by arguing that anyone who encouraged Canadians to act against the state could not escape justice. The speech was notable and helped to popularize Thompson, and he quickly rose to become a leading member of the Conservative government.

== Declines post of prime minister as a Roman Catholic ==
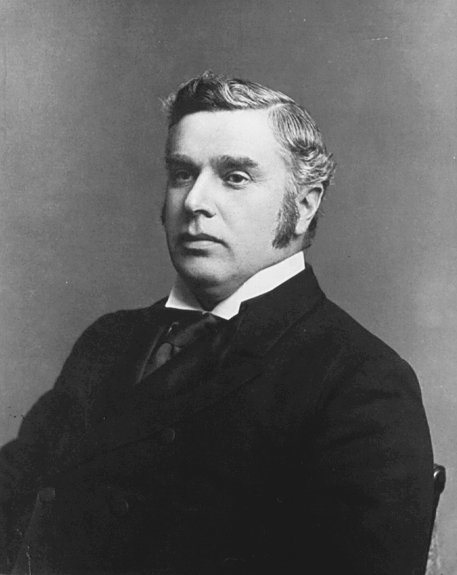
Thompson in 1891.

Thompson was the last minister to see Macdonald before his devastating stroke in May 1891. Following Macdonald's death a week later, there was a Cabinet crisis. The governor general, Lord Stanley of Preston, asked Thompson to form a government, but Thompson declined because of religious prejudice against the Roman Catholicism to which he had converted at his marriage. Thompson recommended John Abbott, who ultimately accepted. After 1893 Prince Edward Island House of Assembly passage of the amalgamation "Bill respecting the Legislature," Thompson, still wary of a Protestant backlash, reported to the Canadian governor general that almost every article of the Prince Edward Island "amalgamation" statute, save for a punitive clause that violated with "little injury" the separation of powers between the Legislative Assembly and provincial court system, was "unobjectionable, and may be left to their operation." In a rejoinder to Neil McLeod (Leader of the Opposition in the provincial legislature), he concluded that there was as much probability of an amendment to increase the supermajority requirement to unanimity (for amending the bill) as there was probability that the entire "section itself may be repealed at any time by statute passed in the ordinary way." Then, in a demonstration that his tenure as prime minister would not result in a papal majority government, Thompson disregarded Conservative allegations of gerrymandering of French Acadian and otherwise Roman Catholic voters in Prince Edward Island. In 1894, Lord Stanley "approved" of this report months before Thompson's fatal heart attack.

== Prime Minister (1892–1894) ==
Thompson assumed the office of Prime Minister in 1892, a year later, when John Abbott retired. Thompson retained the post of Attorney General while he was prime minister.

He came very close to bringing Newfoundland into Confederation, but was unsuccessful.

His first major speech as Prime Minister was given in Toronto in January 1893 and covered the topics of tolerance and Canadian nationalism in conjunction with loyalty to the British crown. At the time, Thompson was concerned about the possibility of the annexation of Canada by the United States, a goal that was being pursued within Canada by the Continental Union Association, a group of Ontario and Quebec Liberals. Despite his concern, Thompson ultimately realized that the conspiracy to make Canada part of the United States was confined to a small and noisy minority within the opposition party.

In March 1893, Thompson travelled to Paris as one of the judges on the tribunal to settle the dispute over the seal harvest in the Bering Sea. The tribunal ruled there was no justification for the American claim that the Bering Sea was closed to all but American seal hunters.

Other matters of concern during Thompson's tenure as prime minister included the reduction of trade tariffs and questions over language in the Manitoba Schools Question. There were serious local disputes over the role of Catholics and Protestants in administering the school system. The issue in Manitoba was not resolved until after his death.

== Supreme Court appointments ==
While in office, Thompson chose the following jurists to sit as justices of the Supreme Court of Canada:

- Sir Samuel Henry Strong (as chief justice, December 13, 1892 – November 18, 1902; appointed a Puisne Justice under Prime Minister Mackenzie, September 30, 1875)
- Robert Sedgewick – (February 18, 1893 – August 4, 1906)
- George Edwin King – (September 21, 1893 – May 8, 1901)

== Death in office ==
Thompson had been Prime Minister of Canada for only two years when he died suddenly from a heart attack at the age of 49 on December 12, 1894. He was at England's Windsor Castle, where Queen Victoria had just made him a member of her Privy Council. Thompson's physical condition had deteriorated during his time in Ottawa; he was significantly overweight when he died (standing 5 feet 7 inches (1.70 m), he weighed about 225 pounds (102 kg)), and had always pushed himself very hard in his work.

Thompson was the second of two Canadian prime ministers to die in office (the first being John A. Macdonald), and the only one to die out of Canada. (Three retired prime ministers died out of Canada: Charles Tupper, Richard Bedford Bennett, and Brian Mulroney). He also lived the shortest lifespan that any Canadian prime minister has lived in history.

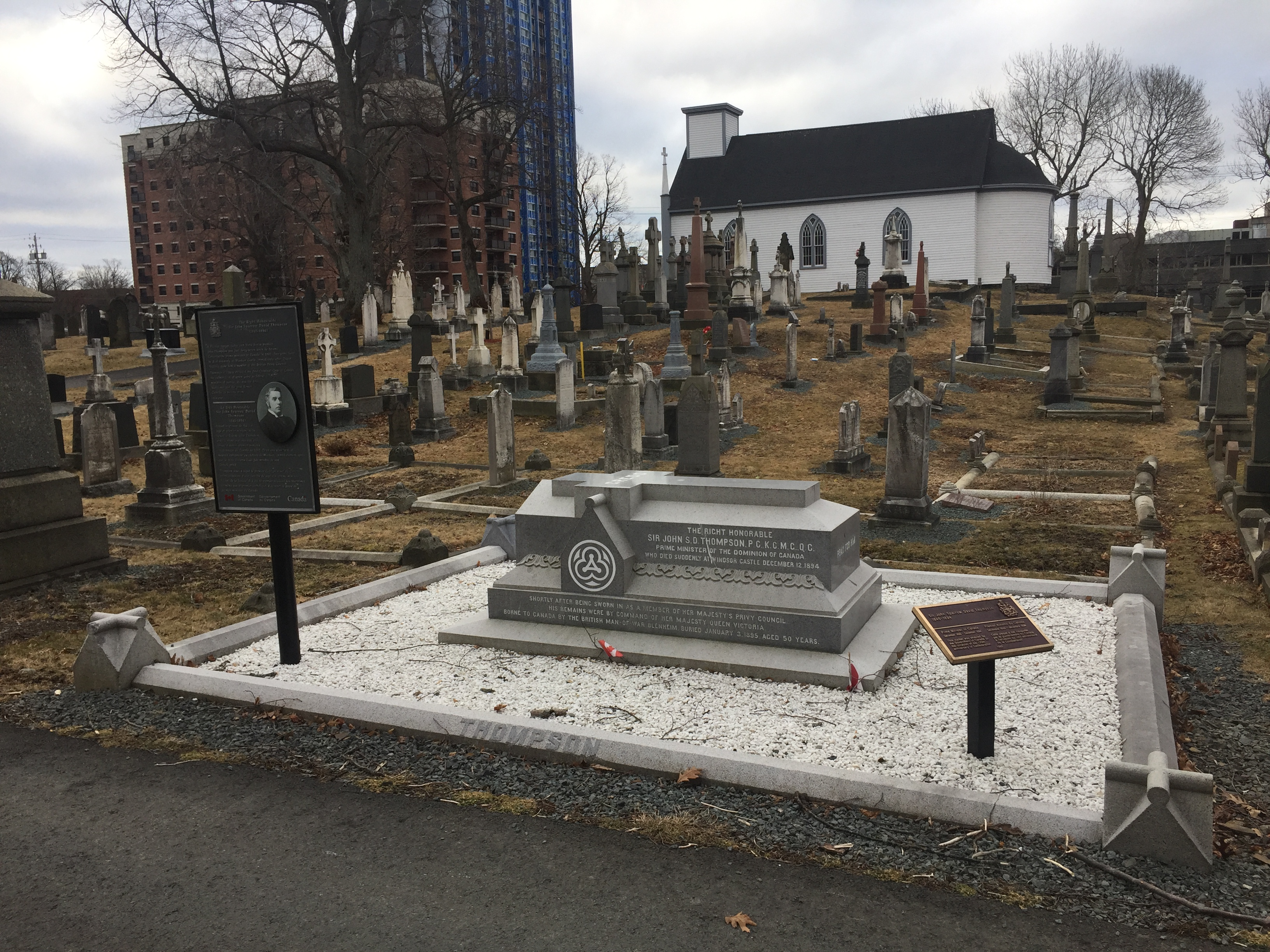
John Thompson Grave, Holy Cross Cemetery, Halifax, Nova Scotia

After an elaborate funeral was staged for him in the United Kingdom by Queen Victoria, Thompson's remains were transported back to Canada aboard the armoured cruiser HMS Blenheim, which was painted black for the occasion. He was buried on January 3, 1895, in the Holy Cross Cemetery in Halifax, Nova Scotia.

Despite having held prime ministerial office, Thompson had little estate, so Parliament set up a fund to support his widow and children. The Canadian politician Margaret Mitchell, who died March 8, 2017, is considered the last of Thompson's descendants.

== Family ==
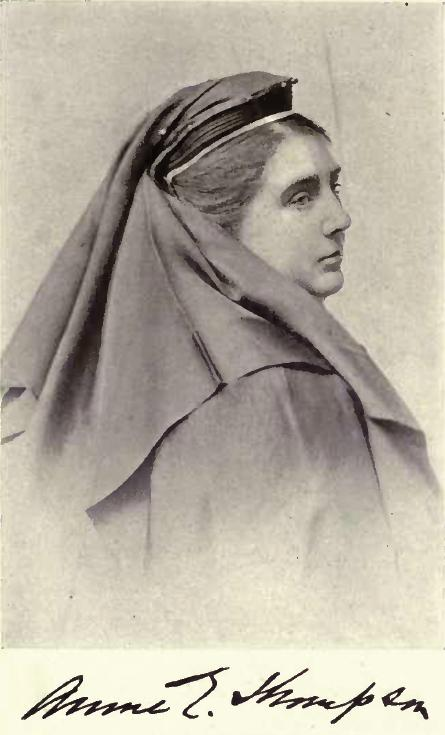
Annie E Thompson by William James Topley

Thompson, then a young barrister, married in 1870 Annie E. Affleck, daughter of John Affleck, of Halifax, Nova Scotia, and his wife, Catherine Saunders. Annie was born and educated in Halifax, Nova Scotia. The couple had nine children, only five of whom survived early childhood. After she was widowed on December 12, 1894, a fund of $30,000 (equivalent to $989 thousand in 2025) was raised for Lady Thompson, headed by Lord Strathcona with a subscription of $5,000; the Parliament of Canada contributed $25,000. The Governor-General, the Earl of Aberdeen undertook the education of the sons. Lady Thompson cofounded, with the Countess of Aberdeen, the National Council of Women, and served as one of its presidents. She served as a governor of the Victorian Order of Nurses. As a widow, she lived at Derwent Lodge, 631 Sherbourne Street in Toronto.

== Legacy ==
Thompson was designated a Person of National Historic Significance in 1937. His collected papers were donated in 1949 to the National Archives of Canada by his son, Colonel John Thompson.

A ranking of the Canadian prime ministers was published by J.L. Granatstein and Norman Hillmer in 1997. A survey of 26 Canadian historians determined that Thompson was ranked #10 of the 20 people who had at that time served as Canadian PM. He was identified as "The great "might-have-been" of Canadian prime ministers...", whose potentially promising career was cut short by his early death. A follow-up article co-authored by Hillmer in 2011 broadened the survey to include survey responses of over 100 historians; in this survey, Thompson was ranked 14th out the 22 who had by then served as PM.

The high school in the Canadian sitcom Life with Derek, SJST, is named after Thompson. Sir John Thompson Catholic Junior High School in Edmonton is named for him. Thompson appears as a prominent character in Paul Marlowe's novel Knights of the Sea (set in 1887 when Thompson was Minister of Justice).

Since 1996, Sir John Thompson's former home in Ottawa at 237 Metcalfe Street has served as the national office of the Canadian Soccer Association.

Nova Scotian artist William Valentine painted Thompson's portrait.

== See also ==
- List of prime ministers of Canada
- List of books about prime ministers of Canada
- Provincial premiers who have become Canadian MPs

== References and further reading ==
- Chisholm, Hugh, ed. (1911). "Thompson, Sir John Sparrow" . Encyclopædia Britannica. Vol. 26 (11th ed.). Cambridge University Press. p. 870.
- Clark, Lovell Crosby. "A History of the Conservative Administrations, 1891-1896." (PhD Dissertation. University of Toronto; ProQuest Dissertations & Theses, 1968. NK15389).
- Gillis, D. Hugh. "Sir John Thompson and Bishop Cameron." CCHA Report 22 (1955): 87-97. online
- Gillis, D. Hugh. "Sir John Thompson's Elections." Canadian Historical Review 37.1 (1956): 23-45. https://doi.org/10.3138/CHR036-01-02
- Heisler, John Phalen. "Sir John Thompson, 1844-1894" (PhD dissertation, University of Toronto; ProQuest Dissertations & Theses, 1955, NK19713).
- Hopkins, J. Castell. Life and Work of the Rt. Hon. Sir John Thompson, Toronto: United Publishing Houses, 1895) online
- Harris, Charles Alexander (1898). "Thompson, John Sparrow David" . In Lee, Sidney (ed.). Dictionary of National Biography. Vol. 56. London: Smith, Elder & Co. pp. 217–218.
- Waite, Peter B. (1985). The Man from Halifax. Sir John Thompson Prime Minister. ISBN 978-0-8020-6624-4. The standard scholarly biography.
- Waite, P. B. “Thompson, Sir John Sparrow David," in Dictionary of Canadian Biography, vol. 12, (University of Toronto/Université Laval, 2003), online
- Waite, P.B. "Thompson, Sir John Sparrow David (1845–1894)". Oxford Dictionary of National Biography (online ed.). Oxford University Press. doi:10.1093/ref:odnb/27272. (Subscription, Wikipedia Library access or UK public library membership required.)
- Waite, P. B. Canada 1874–1896: Arduous destiny. (1996), Scholarly study of national history. online
- Waite, P. B. "An Attorney General of Nova Scotia, JSD Thompson, 1878-1882: Disparate Aspects of Law and Society in Provincial Canada." Dalhousie Law Journal 8 (1984): 165+ online.

=== Attribution ===
Political offices
Preceded by Alexander Campbell	Minister of Justice and Attorney-General; 1885–1894	Succeeded by Charles H. Tupper
Preceded by John Abbott	Prime Minister of Canada; 1892–1894	Succeeded by Mackenzie Bowell
Preceded by John Abbott	Leader of the Conservative Party; 1892–1894	Succeeded by Mackenzie Bowell
Parliament of Canada
Preceded by Angus McIsaac	Member of Parliament for Antigonish; 1885–1894	Succeeded by Colin Francis McIsaac
