= John Sarsfield O'Brien =

Canadian politician from Nova Scotia (1866–1935)

Member of the Nova Scotia House of Assembly for Antigonish County
- In office January 16, 1913 – June 19, 1916

Personal details
- Born: August 12, 1866 Antigonish, Nova Scotia
- Died: May 7, 1935 (aged 68) Antigonish, Nova Scotia
- Party: Liberal Conservative
- Spouse: Ellen McIntosh
- Education: St. Francis Xavier University
- Occupation: merchant, lumberman, politician

John Sarsfield O'Brien (August 12, 1866 – May 7, 1935) was a general merchant, lumberman, commercial traveller, and political figure in Nova Scotia, Canada. He represented Antigonish County in the Nova Scotia House of Assembly from 1913 to 1916 as a Liberal Conservative member.

O'Brien was born in 1866 at Antigonish, Nova Scotia to James O'Brien and Alice Grant. He was educated at St. Francis Xavier University and married Ellen McIntosh on September 28, 1893. He served as a councillor for the Town of Antigonish for four years and as mayor from 1903 to 1904 and again from 1919 to 1920. O'Brien died in 1935 at Antigonish.

He was elected in a by-election on January 16, 1913, but was unsuccessful in the 1916 Nova Scotia general election.
