= Hyland Fraser =

Canadian politician

MLA for Antigonish
- In office 1998–1999
- Preceded by: Bill Gillis
- Succeeded by: Angus MacIsaac

Personal details
- Born: 1946 (age 79–80)
- Party: Liberal

Hyland Fraser (born 1946) was a politician and businessman in Nova Scotia, Canada.

Fraser served in municipal politics for Heatherton from 1984 and was Antigonish County Warden until his resignation in 1998, when he ran for the Liberal nomination for the electoral district of Antigonish.

He served one term in the Nova Scotia House of Assembly, losing the seat to PC candidate Angus MacIsaac by just 12 votes in 1999.

Hyland Fraser died on February 5, 2021, in Edmonton, Alberta.
