= Colin H. Chisholm =

Canadian politician

MLA for Antigonish
- In office 1949–1956
- Preceded by: John Patrick Gorman
- Succeeded by: William F. MacKinnon

Personal details
- Born: December 18, 1919
- Died: March 30, 1994 (aged 74)
- Party: Liberal

Colin Herman Chisholm (December 18, 1919 – March 30, 1994) was a Canadian politician. He represented the electoral district of Antigonish in the Nova Scotia House of Assembly from 1949 to 1956. He was a member of the Nova Scotia Liberal Party.

Born in 1919, Chisholm was a graduate of St. Francis Xavier University, and Macdonald College. He married Eleanor MacDonald. Chisholm entered provincial politics in the 1949 election, winning the Antigonish riding. He was re-elected in the 1953 election. In June 1954, Chisholm was appointed to the Executive Council of Nova Scotia as Minister of Agriculture and Marketing and Minister of Lands and Forests. He was defeated by Progressive Conservative William F. MacKinnon when he ran for re-election in 1956. Chisholm returned to politics in 1970, when he was elected mayor of Antigonish. He died in office on March 30, 1994.
