= Clement O'Leary =

Canadian politician

The Honourable Clement O'Leary

Member of Parliament for Antigonish—Guysborough
- In office March 1958 – June 1962
- Preceded by: Angus Ronald MacDonald
- Succeeded by: John Benjamin Stewart

Personal details
- Born: Clement Augustine O'Leary; 26 June 1916 Lochaber, Nova Scotia, Canada
- Died: 12 June 1969 (aged 52)
- Party: Progressive Conservative
- Profession: Insurance agent, insurance supervisor

Clement Augustine O'Leary (26 June 1916 – 12 June 1969) was a Progressive Conservative party member of the House of Commons of Canada and member of the Senate of Canada. He was born in Lochaber, Nova Scotia whose career was based in the insurance industry.

He was first elected to Parliament at the Antigonish—Guysborough riding in the 1958 general election and served one term, the 24th Parliament, after which he was defeated in the 1962 federal election.

O'Leary was appointed to the Senate on 25 September 1962 under the John Diefenbaker administration and remained a member there until his death in June 1969.

1958 Canadian federal election: Antigonish—Guysborough
Party	Candidate	Votes
Progressive Conservative	Clement O'Leary	6,758
Liberal	Alasdair Graham	5,827

1962 Canadian federal election: Antigonish—Guysborough
Party	Candidate	Votes
Liberal	John B. Stewart	6,296
Progressive Conservative	Clement O'Leary	6,183
New Democratic	John Hugh Campbell	208
Social Credit	Alexander James Malloy	104
