= Annie Thompson =

Canadian politician

Lady Thompson
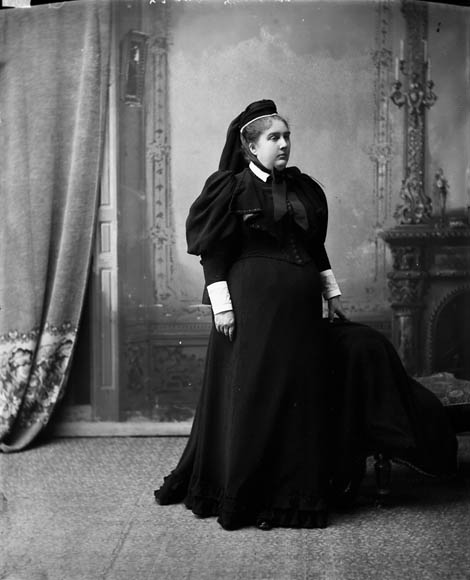
- Lady Thompson in May 1896
- Born: Annie Emma Affleck; June 26, 1842; Halifax, Nova Scotia, Canada
- Died: April 10, 1913 (aged 70); Toronto, Ontario, Canada
- Resting place: Mount Hope Catholic Cemetery, Toronto, Ontario, Canada
- Known for: Spouse of the Prime Minister of Canada
- Spouse: Sir John Thompson
- Children: 9

Annie Emma Thompson, Lady Thompson (née Affleck; June 26, 1842 – April 10, 1913) was the wife of Sir John Thompson, the fourth Prime Minister of Canada.

She was born in Halifax, Nova Scotia, to James Affleck, a sea captain, and Catherine Saunders. She was the eldest of eight children. She has been described by historians as a high-spirited young woman who resembled Catherine Linton in Emily Brontë's Wuthering Heights.

She married Thompson in 1870 in Portland, Maine. Their first child, a son, was stillborn on September 3, 1871. They had eight more children:

1. John Thomas Connolly Thompson (1872–1952)
2. Joseph Thompson (1874–1935)
3. Mary Aloysia (Babe) Thompson (1876–1917)
4. Mary Helena Thompson (1878–1944)
5. Annie Mary Thompson (1879–1880)
6. unknown name (died at birth, December 7, 1880)
7. Frances Alice (Frankie) Thompson (1881–1947)
8. David Anthony Thompson (1883–1885)

In 1882, when John Thompson was concerned about losing an electoral battle in Antigonish, Annie wrote him to say that "I wish I could be with you for one ten minutes to talk square to you...So keep up your courage... win or lose they can't keep you from me much longer...So now you must not be such an awful baby until you get home and then I'll see how far you can be indulged."

John Thompson was appointed to the Supreme Court of Nova Scotia in 1882. When he was offered the opportunity to become Minister of Justice in 1885, Annie Thompson encouraged him to leave that bunch of "sere old crows" (her words) on the Nova Scotia bench and get out into a world which would better test and demonstrate his talents. The Thompson family finally moved to Ottawa in 1888, and John Thompson became Prime Minister in 1892.

On December 12, 1894, John Thompson died of a heart attack in Windsor Castle at the age of 49. He left a very small estate, and the Lady Thompson Fund was begun that month as a private subscription for the children.

Lady Thompson moved to Toronto in 1895. Friends, including Lady Aberdeen and Senator Frank Smith, aided her in finding housing and establishing herself. She lived at 18 1/2 St Joseph Street, and became a member of the nearby St Basil's Roman Catholic Church.

In hospital in 1913 for exploratory surgery, she was diagnosed with inoperable cancer and died on the operating table. She was buried in Mount Hope Catholic Cemetery in Toronto (her husband was buried at Holy Cross Cemetery, Halifax).

== See also ==
- Spouse of the prime minister of Canada
