= John Benjamin Stewart =

Canadian politician

The Honourable John Benjamin Stewart

Member of Parliament for Antigonish—Guysborough
- In office June 1962 – June 1968

Senator
- In office 13 January 1984 – 19 November 1999

Personal details
- Born: 19 November 1924 Antigonish, Nova Scotia, Canada
- Died: 11 June 2015 (aged 90) Bayfield, Nova Scotia, Canada
- Party: Liberal
- Profession: Author, expert on parliamentary procedure, professor

John Benjamin Stewart (19 November 1924 – 11 June 2015) was a Liberal party member of the House of Commons of Canada. He was an author, expert on parliamentary procedure and professor.

He was first elected at the Antigonish—Guysborough riding in the 1962 general election then re-elected there in 1963 and 1965. After riding boundary changes, Stewart campaigned for a seat at South Western Nova in the 1968 election but lost to Louis-Roland Comeau of the Progressive Conservative party.

During his terms in Parliament, Stewart was Parliamentary Secretary to the Minister of Public Works from 1966 to 1968. He also served as Parliamentary Secretary to the Secretary of State for External Affairs in 1963 and 1964, then Parliamentary Secretary to the Secretary of State of Canada until 1965.

Stewart was appointed to the Senate of Canada in January 1984 where he remained until November 1999.

== Electoral record ==
1962 Canadian federal election: Antigonish—Guysborough
Party	Candidate	Votes
Liberal	John B. Stewart	6,296
Progressive Conservative	Clement O'Leary	6,183
New Democratic	John Hugh Campbell	208
Social Credit	Alexander James Malloy	104

1963 Canadian federal election: Antigonish—Guysborough
Party	Candidate	Votes
Liberal	John B. Stewart	6,947
Progressive Conservative	Jack Forbes	5,835

1965 Canadian federal election: Antigonish—Guysborough
Party	Candidate	Votes
Liberal	John B. Stewart	6,210
Progressive Conservative	D. Hugh Gillis	6,163
New Democratic	Leslie Myers	228
