= Maurice Smith (politician) =

Canadian politician

The Honourable Maurice Smith ECNS

Member of the Nova Scotia House of Assembly for Antigonish
- In office October 20, 2009 – October 8, 2013
- Preceded by: Angus MacIsaac
- Succeeded by: Randy Delorey

Personal details
- Party: New Democrat

Maurice Gerard Smith is a Canadian politician, who was elected to the Nova Scotia House of Assembly in a by-election on October 20, 2009. He represented the electoral district of Antigonish as a member of the Nova Scotia New Democratic Party from 2009 to 2013.

On May 30, 2012, Smith was appointed to the Executive Council of Nova Scotia as Minister of Transportation and Infrastructure Renewal.

In the 2013 election, Smith was defeated by Liberal Randy Delorey.
