= William F. MacKinnon =

Canadian politician

MLA for Antigonish
- In office 1956–1970
- Preceded by: Colin H. Chisholm
- Succeeded by: Bill Gillis

Personal details
- Born: December 19, 1919 Antigonish, Nova Scotia
- Died: March 13, 1990 (aged 70)
- Party: Progressive Conservative
- Occupation: radio news editor

William Francis MacKinnon (December 19, 1919 – March 13, 1990) was a Canadian politician. He represented the electoral district of Antigonish in the Nova Scotia House of Assembly from 1956 to 1970. He was a member of the Progressive Conservative Party of Nova Scotia.

Born in 1919 at Antigonish, Nova Scotia, MacKinnon was a graduate of St. Francis Xavier University. He married Agnes Campbell, and was a radio news editor by career. MacKinnon entered provincial politics in the 1956 election, defeating Liberal cabinet minister Colin H. Chisholm by 215 votes in the Antigonish riding. He was re-elected in the 1960, 1963, and 1967 elections. MacKinnon did not reoffer in the 1970 election. MacKinnon died on March 13, 1990.
