= John Patrick Gorman =

Canadian politician

MLA for Antigonish
- In office 1942–1949
- Preceded by: John A. MacIsaac
- Succeeded by: Colin H. Chisholm

Personal details
- Born: August 8, 1876 East Tracadie, Nova Scotia
- Died: July 3, 1963 (aged 86) Antigonish, Nova Scotia
- Party: Liberal

John Patrick Gorman (August 8, 1876 – July 3, 1963) was a Canadian politician. He represented the electoral district of Antigonish in the Nova Scotia House of Assembly from 1942 to 1949. He was a member of the Nova Scotia Liberal Party.

Born in 1876 at East Tracadie, Antigonish County, Nova Scotia, Gorman was a commercial traveler. He was educated at La Salle Academy, Halifax. Gorman married Margaret MacKinnon in 1907.

Gorman entered provincial politics in 1942, winning a byelection in the Antigonish riding following the death of John A. MacIsaac. Gorman was re-elected in the 1945 election. He did not reoffer in the 1949 election. Gorman died at Antigonish on July 3, 1963.
