= Michelle Thompson (politician) =

Canadian politician

The Honourable Michelle Thompson ECNS MLA

Member of the Nova Scotia House of Assembly for Antigonish
- Incumbent
- Assumed office August 17, 2021
- Preceded by: Randy Delorey

Personal details
- Born: Margaret Michelle Thompson
- Party: Progressive Conservative
- Occupation: Nurse, Politician

Margaret Michelle Thompson is a Canadian politician who was elected to the Nova Scotia House of Assembly in the 2021 Nova Scotia general election. She represents the riding of Antigonish as a member of the Progressive Conservative Association of Nova Scotia.

Prior to her election to the legislature, Thompson worked as a registered nurse.

Thompson was sworn in as the Minister for Health and Wellness on August 31, 2021.

She was re-elected in the 2024 Nova Scotia general election.

== Electoral record ==
2024 Nova Scotia general election: Antigonish
Party	Candidate	Votes	%	±%
Progressive Conservative	Michelle Thompson	5,202	64.82	+4.98
Liberal	Sheila Sears	1,720	21.43	-16.67
New Democratic	John David MacIsaac	1,103	13.74	–
Total		8,025	–	
Total rejected ballots		48		
Turnout		8,076	52.37	
Eligible voters		15,422		
Progressive Conservative hold		Swing		
Source: Elections Nova Scotia

2021 Nova Scotia general election: Antigonish
Party	Candidate	Votes	%	±%	Expenditures
Progressive Conservative	Michelle Thompson	4,707	49.98	+14.86	$53,998.17
Liberal	Randy Delorey	2,997	31.82	-11.56	$62,427.05
New Democratic	Moraig Macgillivray	1,552	16.48	-3.83	$47,736.84
Green	Will Fraser	128	1.36	–	$274.35
Atlantica	Ryan Smyth	34	0.36	-0.83	$200.00
Total valid votes/expense limit		9.418	99.59	-0.01	$85,581.45
Total rejected ballots		39	0.41	+0.01	
Turnout		9,457	64.78	+2.68	
Eligible voters		14,599			
Progressive Conservative gain from Liberal		Swing		+13.21	
Source: Elections Nova Scotia
