= Frasers Mills =

Community in Nova Scotia, Canada

Coordinates: 45°29′43.43″N 61°56′15.56″W

Frasers Mills in Nova Scotia

Frasers Mills (Scottish Gaelic: Muileann an Frisealaich) is a community in the Canadian province of Nova Scotia, located in Antigonish County on Nova Scotia Route 316.

In 1828 a wooden dam was built across the South River to power a sawmill and later a grist mill. In 1928 the federal government built a replacement concrete dam to provide water for their new fish hatchery which was taken over by the provincial government in 1982. Over a million Brook, Brown and Rainbow trout and Atlantic salmon are raised here annually to stock the province's lakes and rivers; these fish may be observed in the 37 ponds.
