= Fred Robert Trotter =

Canadian politician (1861–1934)

Frederick Robert Trotter (August 20, 1861 – September 4, 1934) was a farmer and political figure in Nova Scotia, Canada. He represented Antigonish County in the Nova Scotia House of Assembly from 1903 to 1919 as a Liberal member.

Frederick was the grandson of the Reverend Thomas Trotter, born in Antigonish, Nova Scotia, to Robert Trotter, a Scottish immigrant, and Ann Maclennan. He was schooled at Saint Francis Xavier College, a liberal arts institution founded in 1853. He served on the town council for Antigonish and was elected mayor in 1897 and 1898. He was first elected to the provincial assembly in a 1903 by-election held after Angus McGillivray was named to the bench. Trotter died in Antigonish.
