= William Chisholm (Nova Scotia politician) =

Canadian politician

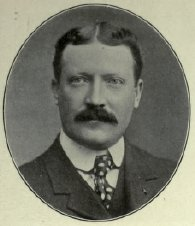

Member of the Canada Parliament for Antigonish
- In office 1905–1916
- Preceded by: Colin Francis McIsaac
- Succeeded by: Riding abolished

Member of the Nova Scotia House of Assembly for Antigonish County
- In office 1916–1933

Nova Scotia Opposition Leader
- In office 1926–1930
- Preceded by: Daniel George McKenzie
- Succeeded by: Alexander Stirling MacMillan

Personal details
- Born: December 8, 1870 Heatherton, Nova Scotia, Canada
- Died: April 28, 1936 (aged 65)
- Party: Liberal
- Other political affiliations: Liberal Party of Nova Scotia
- Profession: Lawyer
- Cabinet: Minister of Public Works and Mines (1925); Minister of Highways (1923-1925); Minister Without Portfolio (1918-1925)

William Chisholm (December 8, 1870 – April 28, 1936) was a Canadian politician.

Born in Heatherton, Antigonish County, Nova Scotia, Chisholm was educated at the Common School of Heatherton and graduated in arts from the St. Francis Xavier College, Antigonish. He read law in the office of Colin F. Mclsaac, who was a member of the Grand Trunk Pacific Railway Commission. A lawyer, he was first elected to the House of Commons of Canada for the electoral district of Antigonish in a 1905 by-election. A Liberal, he was re-elected in 1908 and 1911.

He resigned in 1916 and was elected to the Nova Scotia House of Assembly for the electoral district of Antigonish County. A Nova Scotia Liberal, he was a minister without portfolio from 1918 to 1925 in the cabinet of George Henry Murray and Minister of Highways from 1923 to 1925 and Minister of Public Works and Mines in 1925 in the cabinet of Ernest Howard Armstrong. From 1925 to 1930, he was the Leader of the Opposition. He served in the House of Assembly until 1933.
