= Randy Delorey =

Nova Scotia politician

The Honourable Randy Delorey ECNS
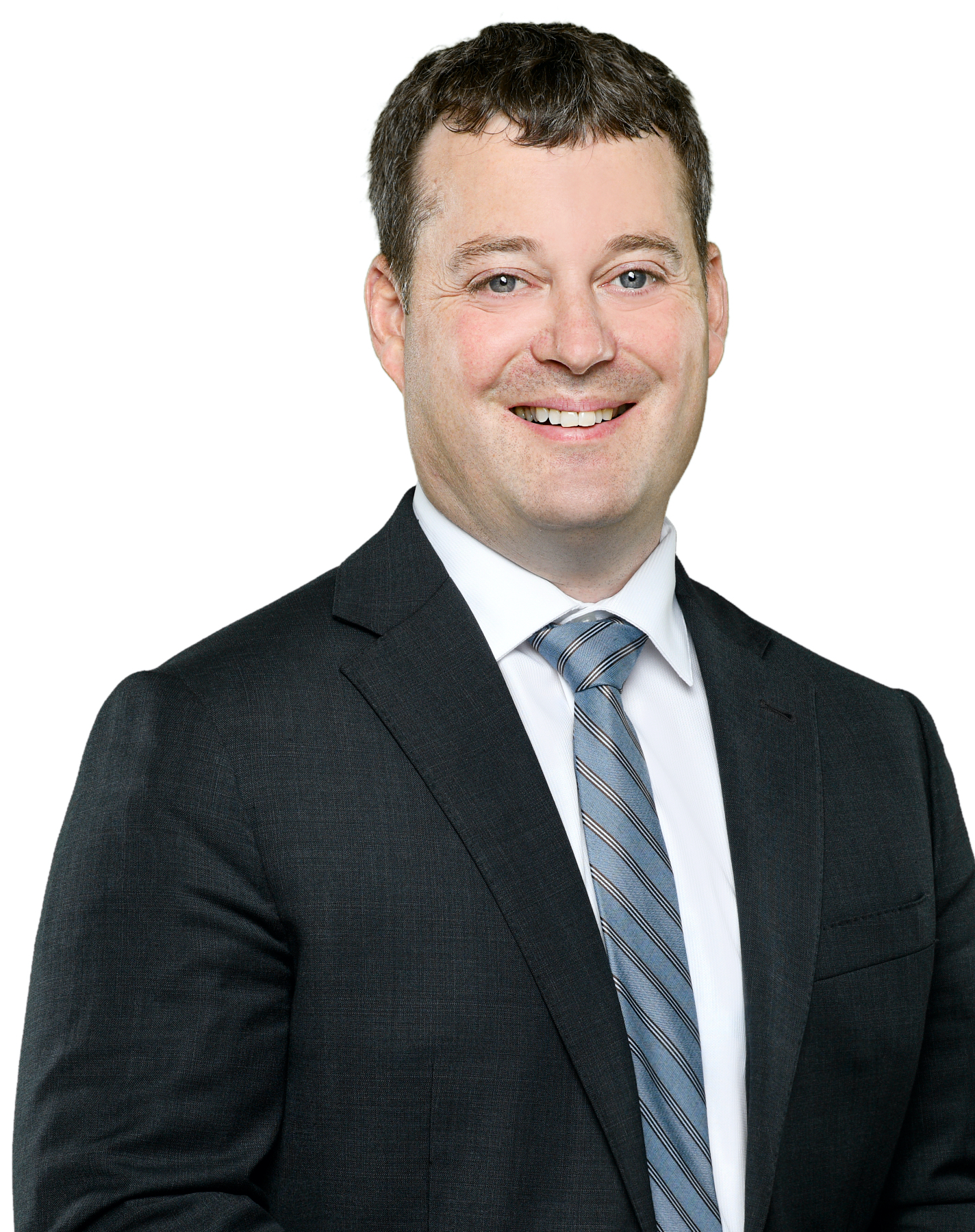

Member of the Nova Scotia House of Assembly for Antigonish
- In office October 8, 2013 – July 17, 2021
- Premier: Stephen McNeil
- Preceded by: Maurice Smith
- Succeeded by: Michelle Thompson

Minister of Environment
- In office October 22, 2013 – July 24, 2015
- Premier: Stephen McNeil
- Preceded by: Sterling Belliveau
- Succeeded by: Andrew Younger

Minister of Gaelic Affairs
- In office October 22, 2013 – October 8, 2020
- Premier: Stephen McNeil
- Preceded by: Maurice Smith
- Succeeded by: Suzanne Lohnes-Croft

Minister of Finance and Treasury Board
- In office July 24, 2015 – June 15, 2017
- Premier: Stephen McNeil
- Preceded by: Diana Whalen
- Succeeded by: Karen Casey

Minister of Environment
- In office November 5, 2015 – January 12, 2016
- Premier: Stephen McNeil
- Preceded by: Andrew Younger
- Succeeded by: Margaret Miller

Minister of Health and Wellness
- In office June 15, 2017 – October 8, 2020
- Premier: Stephen McNeil
- Preceded by: Leo Glavine
- Succeeded by: Leo Glavine

Minister of Justice and Attorney General of Nova Scotia
- In office February 23, 2017 – July 17, 2021
- Premier: Stephen McNeil
- Preceded by: Mark Furey
- Succeeded by: Brad Johns

Provincial Secretary of Nova Scotia
- In office February 23, 2017 – July 17, 2021
- Premier: Stephen McNeil
- Preceded by: Mark Furey
- Succeeded by: Brad Johns

Personal details
- Born: Randy Delorey
- Party: Liberal

Randy Delorey is a Canadian politician, who was elected to the Nova Scotia House of Assembly in the 2013 provincial election. He was one of three candidates to succeed Stephen McNeil as the leader of the Nova Scotia Liberal Party and Premier of Nova Scotia. A member of the Nova Scotia Liberal Party, he represented the electoral district of Antigonish until 2021.

== Early life and education ==
Delorey graduated from St. Francis Xavier University in Antigonish in 2000. Delorey then received a Bachelor of Information Systems degree from St. Francis Xavier University, an MBA from the Université de Moncton, and he is a PhD candidate in management at Saint Mary's University.

== Before politics ==
Prior to his election to the legislature, Delorey was a professor of business management at St. Francis Xavier University. He has also worked as an advocate for community-based education in rural Nova Scotia during controversial school closures in rural Nova Scotia, during which over twenty rural schools were in review for possible closure.

== Political career ==
Delorey entered provincial politics in 2013, defeating Progressive Conservative Darren Thompson and New Democrat cabinet minister Maurice Smith in the Antigonish riding. On October 22, 2013, Delorey was appointed to the Executive Council of Nova Scotia as Minister of Environment and Minister of Gaelic Affairs.

Since being appointed Minister of Environment, he has passed the Importation of Hydraulic Fracturing Wastewater Prohibition Act, and has taken steps to deal with the seven million gallons of wastewater in Debert, Nova Scotia.

In March 2014, he provided conditional approval for the Goldboro, Nova Scotia Liquefied Natural Gas project, which will turn Goldboro into the “energy hub” of Nova Scotia by 2018. The project will lead to a marine terminal and a natural gas liquefaction plant in that community.

In July 2014, Delorey signed an agreement with Pictou Landing First Nation after a blockade of the Boat Harbour effluent treatment facility used by the Northern Pulp mill. The agreement allowed Northern Pulp to continue its work to repair a broken pipe that had spilled effluent near a First Nations burial ground, and will lead to a timeline for the closure of the Boat Harbour Effluent Treatment Facility.

On July 24, 2015, premier Stephen McNeil shuffled his cabinet, naming Delorey as Minister of Finance.

Delorey was re-elected in the Antigonish riding following the 40th Provincial General Election on May 30, 2017. He defeated Progressive Conservative Ray Mattie, New Democrat Moraig MacGillivray, and Atlantica candidate Ryan Smyth. Liberals and Progressive Conservatives saw their vote shares increase from the previous election while the NDP saw a decline.

On June 15, 2017, premier Stephen McNeil shuffled his cabinet, naming Delorey as Minister of Health and Wellness.

On October 7, 2020, Delorey resigned as Minister of Health and Wellness to become a candidate for the leadership of the Nova Scotia Liberal Party.

=== 2021 leadership campaign ===
On October 8, 2020, Delorey announced his candidacy for the leader of the Nova Scotia Liberal Party. He was the third candidate to enter the race, following Labi Kousoulis, MLA for Halifax Citadel-Sable Island and Iain Rankin, MLA for Timberlea-Prospect.

Delorey's campaign was co-chaired by Kelly Regan, MLA for Bedford and Gordon Wilson, MLA for Clare-Digby, and has received the endorsement of 7 sitting members of the Nova Scotia Liberal caucus, the most of any leadership candidate.

Delorey finished in third with 23.10% of points, and was therefore eliminated on the first ballot. The leadership was eventually won narrowly by Iain Rankin who beat out Labi Kousoulis with 52.41% to Kousoulis’ 47.59%.

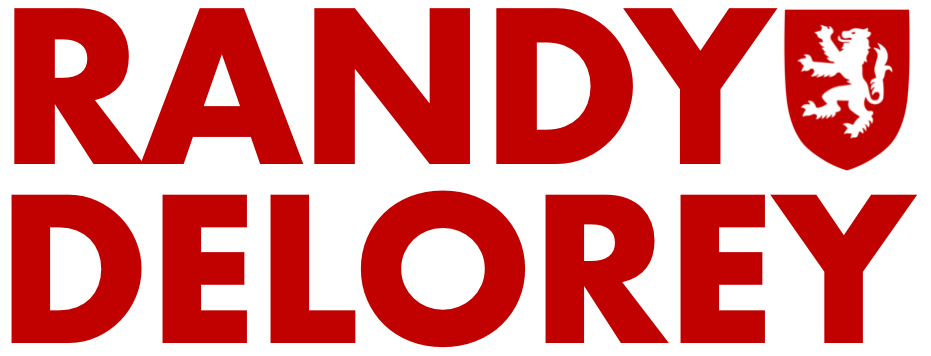
Randy Delorey Leadership Campaign logo

== Electoral record ==
2021 Nova Scotia general election: Antigonish
Party	Candidate	Votes	%	±%	Expenditures
Progressive Conservative	Michelle Thompson	4,707	49.98	+14.86	$53,998.17
Liberal	Randy Delorey	2,997	31.82	-11.56	$62,427.05
New Democratic	Moraig Macgillivray	1,552	16.48	-3.83	$47,736.84
Green	Will Fraser	128	1.36	–	$274.35
Atlantica	Ryan Smyth	34	0.36	-0.83	$200.00
Total valid votes/expense limit		9.418	99.59	-0.01	$85,581.45
Total rejected ballots		39	0.41	+0.01	
Turnout		9,457	64.78	+2.68	
Eligible voters		14,599			
Progressive Conservative gain from Liberal		Swing		+13.21	
Source: Elections Nova Scotia

2017 Nova Scotia general election
Party	Candidate	Votes	%	±%
Liberal	Randy Delorey	3877	43.38	+0.60
Progressive Conservative	Ray Mattie	3139	35.12	+3.51
New Democratic Party	Moraig MacGillivray	1815	20.31	-5.30
Atlantica	Ryan Smyth	106	1.19	--

2013 Nova Scotia general election
Party	Candidate	Votes	%	±%
Liberal	Randy Delorey	3882	42.78	+19.89
Progressive Conservative	Darren Thompson	2868	31.61	-4.10
New Democratic Party	Maurice Smith	2324	25.61	-15.79
