= Christopher P. Chisholm =

Canadian politician (1854–1934)

Christopher Paul Chisholm (April 12, 1854 – March 5, 1934) was a Canadian lawyer and political figure in Nova Scotia. He represented Antigonish County in the Nova Scotia House of Assembly from 1891 to 1916 as a Liberal member.

He was born in Clydesdale, Nova Scotia, the son of Donald Chisholm, and educated at Saint Francis Xavier College. Chisholm was called to the bar in 1883 and set up practice in Antigonish. In 1890, he married Sarah Campbell. Chisholm was first elected to the provincial assembly in an 1891 by-election held after Angus McGillivray was elected to the House of Commons. In 1903, he was named a minister without portfolio in the province's Executive Council; he was named Commissioner of Public Works and Mines in 1907. In 1916, he was named to the province's Legislative Council.
