= Holy Cross Cemetery (Halifax, Nova Scotia) =

Roman Catholic cemetery in Nova Scotia, Canada

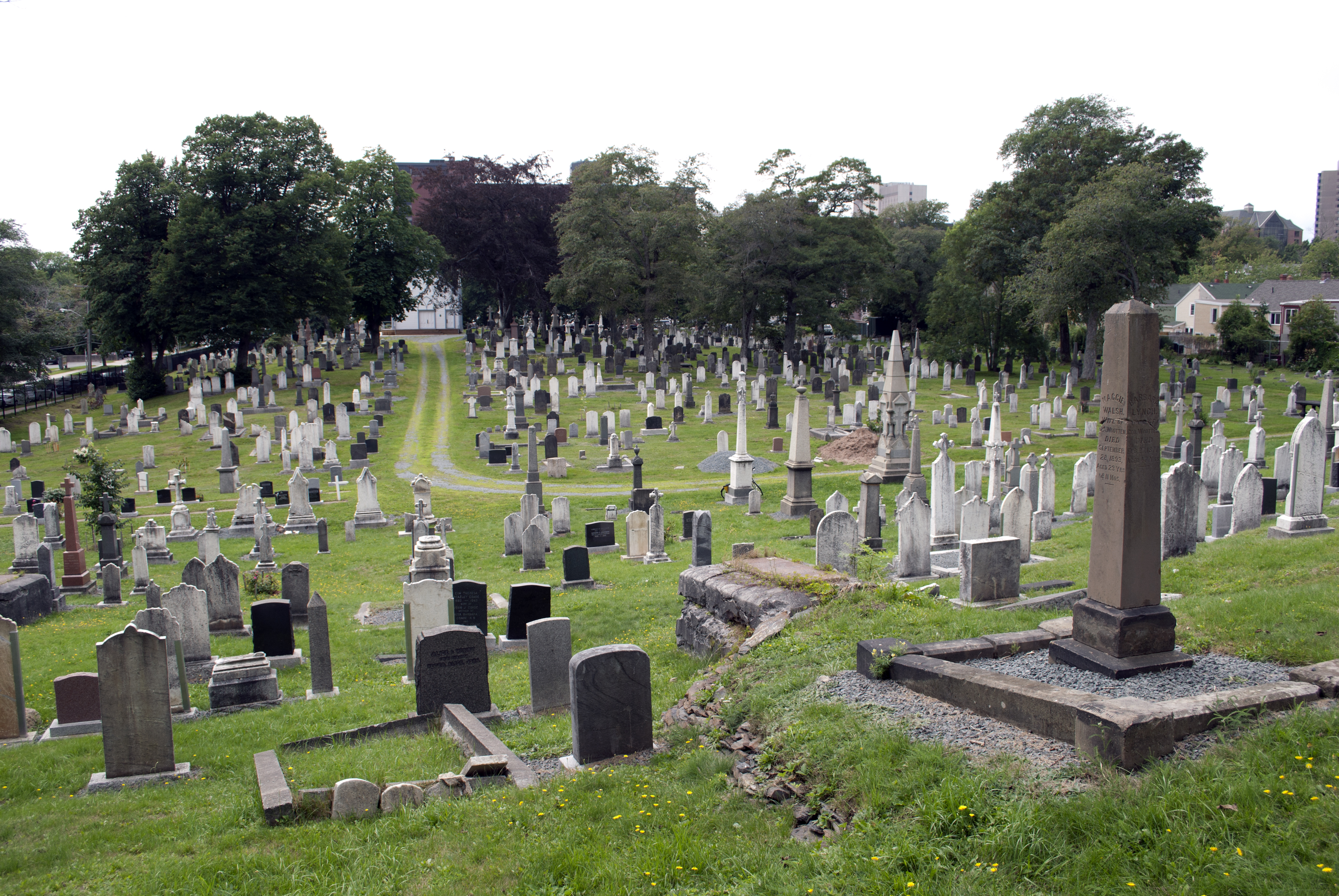
- Holy Cross Cemetery Halifax
- Interactive map of Holy Cross Cemetery

Details
- Established: 1843
- Location: 1259 South Park St, Halifax, Nova Scotia
- Country: Canada
- Coordinates: 44.6391°N 63.5760°W
- Owned by: Roman Catholic Archdiocese of Halifax-Yarmouth
- No. of graves: 2500
- Find a Grave: Holy Cross Cemetery

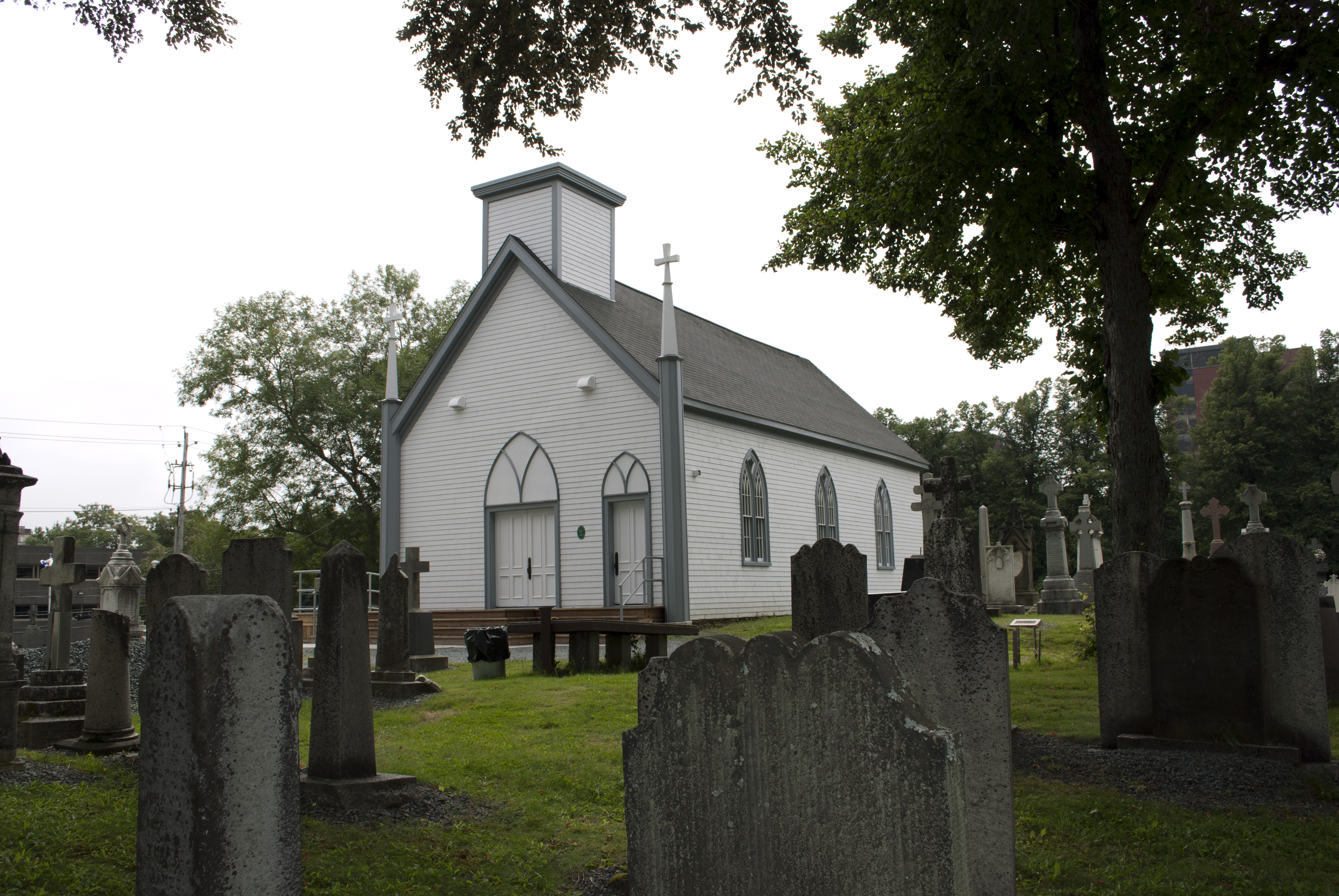
Our Lady of Sorrows Chapel

Holy Cross Cemetery is a cemetery in Halifax, Nova Scotia, owned and operated by the Roman Catholic Archdiocese of Halifax-Yarmouth. It was constructed in 1843 under the direction of Archbishop William Walsh, on land provided by local authorities. Holy Cross Cemetery replaced the first Catholic cemetery in Halifax, the St. Peter's Cemetery located next to St. Mary's Basilica on Spring Garden Road. Since 1843, some 25,000 persons have been buried at Holy Cross, many of Irish descent, including Canada's fourth Prime Minister, Sir John Sparrow Thompson.

Our Lady of Sorrows Chapel is said to have been built in one day on Aug. 31, 1843 by 2,000 volunteers, although the foundation and some prefabrication had been done in advance. The chapel's modest design is described as a Nova Scotian expression of Gothic revivalism. The furnishings are sparse and modest but the altar reliefs have received national recognition, and the windows have been described as a nationally significant collection of stained glass.

Holy Cross Cemetery served as the primary for Halifax Catholics until 1896, and although interments continued through the twentieth-century the site had fallen into disrepair by 2005. The Holy Cross Cemetery Trust was established in 2006, and a program of restoration and beautification by volunteers has been in progress since 2008, repairing fences, the chapel, and 1800 of the current 2500 gravemarkers.

== Notable interments ==
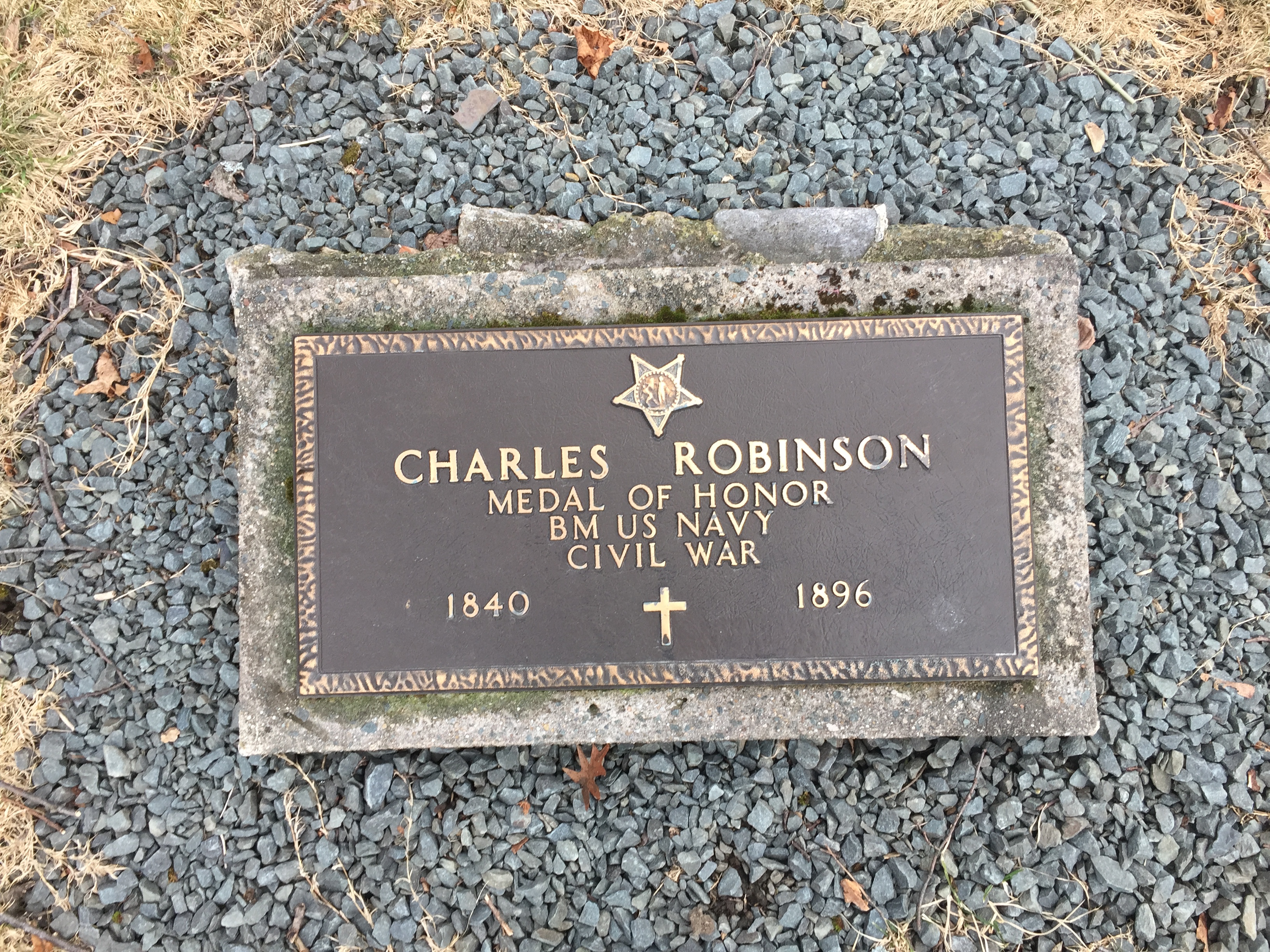
Charles Robinson Grave, Holy Cross Cemetery, Halifax, Nova Scotia

There are many notable persons buried in the cemetery including:

- Sir John Sparrow Thompson, Prime Minister of Canada
- Hon. Sir Edward Kenny
- Thomas Edward Kenny
- Charles Robinson (1840–1896), US Civil War Medal of Honor

The cemetery also contains war graves of nine Canadian service personnel, six of World War I and three of World War II.
