= Angus McIsaac =

Canadian politician

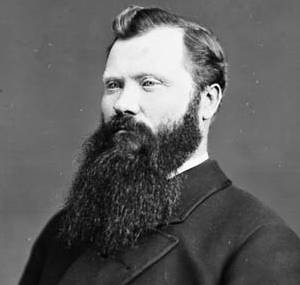

Member of the Canada Parliament for Antigonish
- In office 1873–1885
- Preceded by: Hugh McDonald
- Succeeded by: John Sparrow David Thompson

Personal details
- Born: 1842 Antigonish, Nova Scotia
- Died: June 12, 1902 (aged 59–60)
- Party: Liberal
- Relations: Colin Francis McIsaac (brother)
- Education: St. Francis Xavier University
- Occupation: lawyer, judge

Angus McIsaac (1842 – June 12, 1902) was a Canadian lawyer, judge and political figure in Nova Scotia. He represented Antigonish in the House of Commons of Canada as a Liberal member from 1873 to 1885.

He was born in Antigonish, Nova Scotia in 1842, the son of Donald MacIsaac and Catherine MacGillivray, and studied at Saint Francis Xavier College. McIsaac served as inspector of schools for Antigonish County. He articled in law with William Joseph Croke and Daniel MacDonald and was called to the bar in 1871. He practised law in Antigonish. In 1882, he married Mary Power.

MacIsaac was elected to the House of Commons in an 1873 by-election held after Hugh McDonald was named to the Nova Scotia Supreme Court. He resigned from his seat in 1885 to accept an appointment as judge in the county court. He died in Antigonish while still a judge at the age of 60.

His brother Colin Francis McIsaac represented Antigonish in the Nova Scotia assembly and the House of Commons. His son Joseph P. McIsaac unsuccessfully contested the 1926 Alberta general election for the constituency of Peace River as a member of the Alberta Liberal Party.

Parliament of Canada
Preceded by Hugh McDonald	Member of Parliament for Antigonish; 1873–1885	Succeeded by John Sparrow David Thompson
