= Angus J. MacGillivray =

Canadian politician

Angus J. MacGillivray (November 3, 1865 – April 3, 1931) was a farmer and political figure in Nova Scotia, Canada. He represented Antigonish County in the Nova Scotia House of Assembly from 1920 to 1925 as a United Farmers member.

He was the son of John A. MacGillivray. In 1900, he married Mary MacIntosh. He served on the municipal council for Antigonish County and was county warden from 1916 to 1919. He lived in Dunmaglass, Antigonish County.
