= John A. MacIsaac =

Canadian politician

MLA for Antigonish
- In office 1941 – June 1, 1942
- Preceded by: John L. McIsaac
- Succeeded by: John Patrick Gorman

Personal details
- Born: August 1883 Broad Cove Banks, Nova Scotia
- Died: June 1, 1942 (aged 58) Antigonish, Nova Scotia
- Party: Liberal
- Occupation: businessman

John A. MacIsaac (August 1883 – June 1, 1942) was a Canadian politician. He represented the electoral district of Antigonish in the Nova Scotia House of Assembly from 1941 to 1942. He was a member of the Nova Scotia Liberal Party.

MacIsaac was born in 1883 at Broad Cove Banks, Inverness County, Nova Scotia. He married Mary Catherine MacDonald in 1916. MacIsaac entered provincial politics in the 1941 election, winning the Antigonish riding by over 1000 votes. MacIsaac died in office on June 1, 1942.
