= Colin Francis McIsaac =

Canadian politician (1854–1927)

Colin Francis McIsaac, KC (February 14, 1854 – March 14, 1927) was a Nova Scotia lawyer and political figure. He represented Antigonish in the House of Commons of Canada from 1895 to 1905 and Antigonish—Guysborough from 1922 to 1925 as a Liberal member.

He was born in South River, Antigonish County, Nova Scotia in 1854, the son of Donald McIsaac and Catherine McGillivray. He was educated at Saint Francis Xavier College and was called to the Nova Scotia bar in 1880. McIsaac served as a governor of Saint Francis Xavier College. He practised law in Antigonish. In 1892, he married Mary Helena Houlett. McIsaac was named King's Counsel in 1905.

He was elected to the Nova Scotia House of Assembly for Antigonish in 1886, was reelected in 1890 and served as a minister without portfolio in the provincial Executive Council.

McIsaac served as a member of the National Transcontinental Railway Commission from 1905 to 1912. He died in Antigonish at the age of 73.

His brother Angus represented Antigonish in the House of Commons.

== Electoral record ==
1921 Canadian federal election: Antigonish—Guysborough
Party	Candidate	Votes
Liberal	Colin Francis McIsaac	6,752
Progressive Conservative	Walter McNeil	3,356
Progressive	Daniel McIsaac	1,553

1926 Canadian federal election: Antigonish—Guysborough
Party	Candidate	Votes
Progressive Conservative	John Carey Douglas	6,140
Liberal	Colin Francis McIsaac	6,003

Parliament of Canada
Preceded by John Sparrow David Thompson	Member of Parliament for Antigonish; 1895–1905	Succeeded by William Chisholm
