= Charles B. Whidden =

Canadian politician

Charles Blanchard Whidden (June 5, 1831 – June 20, 1902) was a farmer, merchant, ship owner and political figure in Nova Scotia, Canada. He represented Antigonish County in the Nova Scotia House of Assembly from 1882 to 1886 as a Liberal-Conservative member.

He was born in Antigonish, Nova Scotia, the son of John Blair Whidden and Harriet Elizabeth Symonds, and was educated at the grammar school and Academy there. In 1856, he married Eunice C. Graham. He ran unsuccessfully for a seat in the House of Commons in 1878 and 1882 before being elected in an 1882 by-election held after John Sparrow David Thompson was named a judge. Whidden married Emma A. Harris in 1890. He died in Antigonish.
