= John J. McKinnon =

Canadian politician

John J. McKinnon (July 29, 1847 – January, 1884) was a lawyer and political figure in Nova Scotia, Canada. He represented Antigonish County in the Nova Scotia House of Assembly from 1874 to 1877 as an independent member.

He was born at Williams Point, Antigonish County, Nova Scotia, the son of John McKinnon, a former member of the assembly and member of the Legislative Council, and Jeannet Chisholm. He was educated at St. Francis Xavier College. McKinnon was called to the Nova Scotia bar in 1872. In 1874, he married Christina McDonald. McKinnon resigned his seat in the assembly in 1877. He ran unsuccessfully for a seat in the House of Commons in 1878. McKinnon died in Winnipeg, Manitoba at the age of 36. He was a Roman Catholic and a liberal conservative.
