= John McKinnon (Nova Scotia politician, born 1808) =

Canadian politician

John McKinnon (November 20, 1808 – September 8, 1892) was a political figure in Nova Scotia. He represented Sydney County and later Antigonish County in the Nova Scotia House of Assembly from 1850 to 1867.

He was born in Dorchester, Antigonish County, Nova Scotia, the son of John McKinnon, an immigrant from Scotland, and was educated in Dorchester. In 1834, he married Jeannet Chisholm. He was a minister without portfolio in the province's Executive Council from 1857 to 1860 and from 1863 to 1867. In 1868, he was named to the Legislative Council of Nova Scotia. McKinnon also served as an Agricultural Commissioner for Nova Scotia.

His son John J. McKinnon also served in the provincial assembly.
