= Edward Lavin Girroir =

Canadian politician

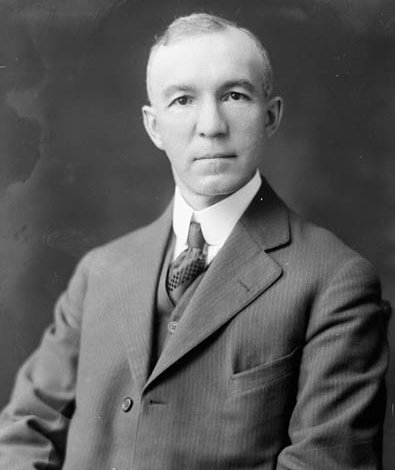

Senator for Antigonish, Nova Scotia
- In office 1912–1932
- Appointed by: Robert Borden

Member of the Nova Scotia House of Assembly for Antigonish County
- In office June 14, 1911 – November 19, 1911

Personal details
- Born: August 26, 1871 Tracadie, Nova Scotia
- Died: May 8, 1932 (aged 60)
- Party: Conservative

Edward Lavin Girroir (August 26, 1871 – May 8, 1932) was a Canadian politician.

Born August 26 or 27, 1871 in Tracadie, Nova Scotia, he was the son of William Girroir and Anne (Lavin) Girroir. He had a twin brother, Hubert, who died one month after their birth, on September 25, 1871.

Girroir was educated at Saint Francis Xavier College and Dalhousie University. He was a Halifax lawyer, and also lectured on international law at Saint Francis Xavier University in Antigonish, Nova Scotia. In 1902, he married Lauretta Maude Corbin; she died in 1909. Senator Girroir and Mrs. Girroir (née Corbin) had at least one son, Edward Lavin, Jr., born February 10, 1907.

In 1900, 1905 and 1908, Girroir ran unsuccessfully for the House of Commons of Canada as a Conservative candidate in the federal riding of Antigonish.

In 1911, he was elected to the Nova Scotia House of Assembly as a Liberal-Conservative representing the provincial riding of Antigonish.

Girroir was appointed to the Senate of Canada on November 20, 1912, as a Conservative representing the senatorial division of Antigonish. He was the second Acadian senator from Nova Scotia. He died in office on May 8, 1932.
