= Globensky =

Globensky or Globenski is a Polish masculine surname, its feminine counterpart is Globenska. It may refer to

- Allan Globensky (born 1951), Canadian ice hockey player
- August Franz Globensky (born Głąbiński; 1754–1830), Polish physician
- Charles-Auguste-Maximilien Globensky (1830–1906), Canadian writer and politician, son of Maximilien
- Hortense Globensky-Prévost (1804–1873), Canadian heroine
- Maximilien Globensky (1793–1866), French-Canadian soldier, son of August

== See also ==
- Głąbiński
