= Two Mountains (Province of Canada electoral district) =

Electoral district in former Province of Canada

Two Mountains Canada East
Province of Canada electoral district

Defunct pre-Confederation electoral district
- Legislature: Legislative Assembly of the Province of Canada
- District created: 1841
- District abolished: 1867
- First contested: 1841
- Last contested: 1863

Two Mountains (French name: Lac des Deux Montagnes) was an electoral district of the Legislative Assembly of the Province of Canada, Canada East, in a rural area north-west of Montreal. It was created in 1841, based on the previous electoral district of the same name for the Legislative Assembly of Lower Canada.

In 1853, the provincial Parliament redrew the electoral map. The boundaries for Two Mountains were altered to some extent in the new map, which came into force for the 1854 general elections.

Two Mountains was represented by one member in the Legislative Assembly. It was abolished in 1867, upon the creation of Canada and the province of Quebec.

== Boundaries ==
Two Mountains electoral district was located in a rural area, north-west of Montreal, (now in the area known as the Deux-Montagnes Regional County Municipality). It was bordered to the south and south-west by the Ottawa River, which was the boundary between Canada East and Canada West.

=== 1841 to 1854 ===
The Union Act, 1840, passed by the British Parliament, merged the two provinces of Upper Canada and Lower Canada into the Province of Canada, with a single Parliament. The separate parliaments of Lower Canada and Upper Canada were abolished. The Union Act provided that the pre-existing electoral boundaries of Lower Canada and Upper Canada would continue to be used in the new Parliament, unless altered by the Union Act itself.

The Two Mountains electoral district of Lower Canada was not altered by the Act, and therefore continued with the same boundaries which had been set by a statute of Lower Canada in 1829:

The County of the Two Mountains shall be bounded on the east and north east, by the south west boundary of the Seigniory of Blainville, and the augmentation to Mille Isles, by the rear line of the augmentation to the Seigniory of the Lake of the Two Mountains, by the rear line of Argenteuil, the eastern outline of the Township of Wentworth continued to the south west bounds of the Township of Howard, thence along the said bounds, and continuing on the same course, north westward to the northern boundary of the Province, on the west by the said County of Ottawa, on the south and south west by the Grand or Ottawa River, and shall include the Isle Bizarre and all the Islands in the Grand or Ottawa River nearest to the said County, in the whole or in part fronting or intersecting the same, and on the north and north west, by the northern boundary of the Province; which County so bounded comprises the Seigniories of Mille Isles or Rivière du Chêne, Lake of the Two Mountains and the augmentation thereto, and Argenteuil, and the Townships of Chatham, Grenville and Wentworth, Harrington, Arundel and Howard, and the Parishes of Saint Eustache, Saint Benôit, Saint Scholastique, Lake of the Two Mountains, and Isle Bizarre, and all the Parishes, Townships and lands in the whole or in part comprised within the above limits.

=== 1854 to 1867 ===
In 1853, the Parliament of the Province of Canada passed a new electoral map. The boundaries of Two Mountains were altered to some extent by the new map, which came into force in the general elections of 1854:

The County of Two-Mountains shall be bounded on the east by the County of Terrebonne as above described, on the south by the River Ottawa and the Lake of the Two-Mountains, including all Islands nearest to the said county and wholly or in part opposite thereto, on the west by the western limits of the Parishes of Saint Benoit, Sainte Scholastique and Saint Columban and the northern limits of the Township of Gore, thence by the eastern limits of the Townships of Wentworth and Howard, to the County of Terrebonne as above described; the said County so bounded comprising the Parishes of Saint Eustache, Saint Augustin, Saint Benoit, Sainte Scholastique, Saint Columban, the Mission of the Lake of Two-Mountains, that part of the Parish of Saint Jérôme which is in the Seigniory of Two-Mountains, that part of the same Parish of Saint Jérôme which comprises the Côte Saint Joseph, Saint Eustache, Sainte Marguerite, Sainte Angelique, and part of the Township of Morin.

== Members of the Legislative Assembly (1841–1867) ==
Two Mountains was a single-member constituency.

The following were the members of the Legislative Assembly for Two Mountains. The party affiliations are based on the biographies of individual members given by the National Assembly of Quebec, as well as votes in the Legislative Assembly. "Party" was a fluid concept, especially during the early years of the Province of Canada.

Parliament	Members	Years in Office	Party
1st Parliament; 1841-1844	Colin Robertson (Note: Died in office after being thrown from his sleigh, February 3, 1842: Côté, Political Appointments and Elections, p. 59, note (48).)	1841–1842	Unionist and Tory
1st Parliament; 1841-1844	Charles John Forbes (Note: Elected in by-election, April 18, 1842: Côté, Political Appointments and Elections, p. 60, note (49).)	1842–1844 (by-election)	"British" Tory
2nd Parliament; 1844–1847	William Henry Scott	1844–1851	"British" Tory (1844–1846); "English" Liberal (1847)
3rd Parliament; 1848–1851	William Henry Scott	1844–1851	"English" Liberal (1848); French-Canadian Group (1849); Moderate (1850–1851)
4th Parliament; 1851–1854	William Henry Scott (Note: Died in office, December 18, 1851: Côté, Political Appointments and Elections, p. 62, note (152).)	1851	Died before Parliament sat
4th Parliament; 1851–1854	Louis-Joseph Papineau (Note: Elected in by-election, July 9, 1852: Côté, Political Appointments and Elections, p. 62, note (153).)	1852–1854	Rouge
5th Parliament; 1854–1857	Jean-Baptiste Daoust	1854–1867	Ministerialist
6th Parliament; 1858–1861	Jean-Baptiste Daoust	1854–1867	Bleu
7th Parliament; 1861–1863	Jean-Baptiste Daoust	1854–1867	Bleu
8th Parliament; 1863–1867	Jean-Baptiste Daoust	1854–1867	Confederation; Bleu

== Abolition ==
The district was abolished on July 1, 1867, when the British North America Act, 1867 came into force, creating Canada and splitting the Province of Canada into Quebec and Ontario. It was succeeded by electoral districts of the same name nd boundaries in the House of Commons of Canada and the Legislative Assembly of Quebec.

== See also ==
- List of elections in the Province of Canada
