= Joseph Arthur Calixte Éthier =

Canadian politician

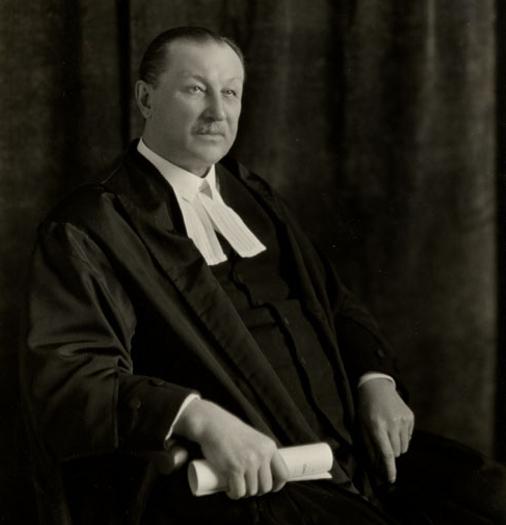

Member of the Canadian Parliament for Two Mountains
- In office 1896–1917
- Preceded by: Joseph Girouard
- Succeeded by: The electoral district was abolished in 1914.

Member of the Canadian Parliament for Laval—Two Mountains
- In office 1917–1925
- Preceded by: The electoral district was created in 1914.
- Succeeded by: Liguori Lacombe

Personal details
- Born: May 26, 1868 St-Benoît, Quebec
- Died: August 14, 1936 (aged 68)
- Party: Liberal

Joseph Arthur Calixte Éthier, KC (May 26, 1868 – August 14, 1936) was a Canadian politician.

Born in St-Benoît, Quebec, the son of J. B. Éthier and Julie Boyer, Éthier was educated at Montreal College. A lawyer, he was called to the Quebec Bar in 1895 and was created a King's Counsel in 1906. He was Deputy-prothonotary for the District of Terrebonne from 1888 to 1895 and was a Crown Prosecutor for that District in 1901. He was mayor of Sainte-Scholastique, Quebec from 1899 to 1906. He was first elected to Canadian Parliament at the general elections of 1896 for the riding of Two Mountains winning by 17 votes. A Liberal, he was re-elected in every following election including the 1921 election. He did not run in 1925.

== Electoral record ==
1896 Canadian federal election: Two Mountains
Party	Candidate	Votes
Liberal	Joseph Arthur Calixte Éthier	1,227
Conservative	Joseph Girouard	1,210

1900 Canadian federal election: Two Mountains
Party	Candidate	Votes
Liberal	Joseph Arthur Calixte Éthier	1,455
Conservative	Joseph Girouard	1,323

By-election: On election being declared void, 6 August 1902

By-election on 24 February 1903
Party	Candidate	Votes
Liberal	Joseph Arthur Calixte Éthier	1,392
Conservative	Benjamin Beauchamp	1,268

1904 Canadian federal election: Two Mountains
Party	Candidate	Votes
Liberal	Joseph Arthur Calixte Éthier	1,460
Conservative	George N. Fauteux	1,333

1908 Canadian federal election: Two Mountains
Party	Candidate	Votes
Liberal	Joseph Arthur Calixte Éthier	1,427
Conservative	Guillaume-André Fauteux	1,335

1911 Canadian federal election: Two Mountains
Party	Candidate	Votes
Liberal	Joseph Arthur Calixte Éthier	acclaimed
