= Głąbiński =

Głąbiński is a Polish masculine surname, its feminine counterpart is Głąbińska. It may refer to

- August Franz Globensky (born Głąbiński; 1754–1830), Polish physician
- Stanisław Głąbiński (1862–1941), Polish politician, academic, lawyer and writer

== See also ==
- Globensky
