= Charles John Forbes =

British army officer and Canadian politician

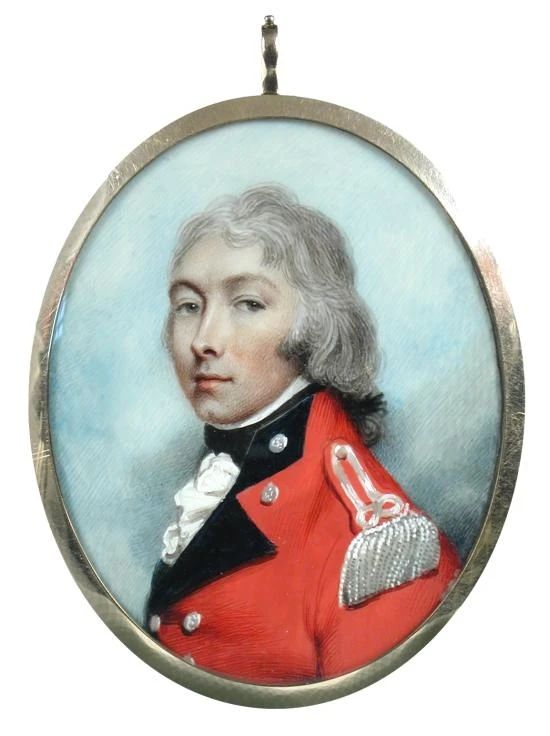
- portrait by Andrew Plimer

Member of the Legislative Assembly of the Province of Canada for Two Mountains
- In office 1842–1844
- Preceded by: Colin Robertson
- Succeeded by: William Henry Scott

Personal details
- Born: 10 February 1786 Gosport, Hampshire, England
- Died: 22 September 1862 (aged 76) Carillon, Canada East, Province of Canada
- Party: Tory
- Spouse: Sophia Browne (m. 20 June 1815)
- Children: 7 children
- Education: College of Altona
- Occupation: Army commissariat; landowner and speculator
- Nickname: "The General"

Military service
- Allegiance: Britain
- Branch/service: British Army Commissariat
- Years of service: 1805–1817; 1824–1836
- Rank: Deputy Commissary General
- Battles/wars: Napoleonic Wars; Mediterranean theatre; Peninsular War; War of 1812; Battle of New Orleans; Lower Canada Rebellion; Burning of Saint-Benoît

Charles John Forbes (10 February 1786 – 22 September 1862) was an official in the Commissariat Department of the British Army during the Napoleonic Wars. He later was posted to Lower Canada, where he was responsible for supplying the British Army units there, as well as obtaining the supplies necessary for the construction of the canal system on the Ottawa River, including the Carillon Canal. After he retired from the Commissariat Department in 1836, Forbes and his family settled in Lower Canada, where he bought a large estate at Carillon.

Forbes was involved in the suppression of the Lower Canada Rebellion in the Deux-Montagnes region, including the burning of Saint-Benoît in December, 1837. He supported the union of Lower Canada and Upper Canada into the Province of Canada in 1841, and served briefly in the Legislative Assembly of the Province of Canada.

== Early life and family ==
Forbes was born in Gosport, Hampshire, England in 1786, the ninth child of Robert Forbes and Elizabeth Cobb. He studied at the College of Altona at Altona, at that time in Denmark, now in Germany.

In 1815 he married Sophia Browne, probably in England. The couple had seven children. John Wainwright, who was appointed to the Special Council of Lower Canada in 1839, was Sophia's cousin.

== Military career ==
In 1805, Forbes joined the Commissariat Department of the British Army, which was responsible for provisions and supplies for the army. Beginning as a clerk, Forbes rose rapidly, due to his skills, a good personality, and a sense of daring. He soon held the rank of deputy commissary general. During the Napoleonic Wars, Forbes served in the Mediterranean theatre, including a brief period of imprisonment in Egypt. He was posted to the Peninsular War in 1813 to 1814, and was also present at the Battle of New Orleans in 1815. He retired from the army in 1817 on half-pay.

For the next seven years, Forbes and his family lived at Corfu, in Italy, and in France. In 1824, Forbes returned to active service with the Commissariat and was posted to Nova Scotia. The next year, he was transferred to Montreal in Lower Canada, where he was responsible for providing all supplies needed by the British Army units in the district. He was also responsible for providing supplies for the construction of the canal system on the Ottawa River, including the Carillon Canal. In 1833 he was posted to Jamaica for two years, but was invalided back to Britain. During his posting in Canada, he had purchased land near Carillon in Lower Canada, and his family had stayed there during his Jamaica posting. After his illness in Jamaica, he retired again in 1836 and returned to his estate at Carillon.

== Lower Canada Rebellion ==
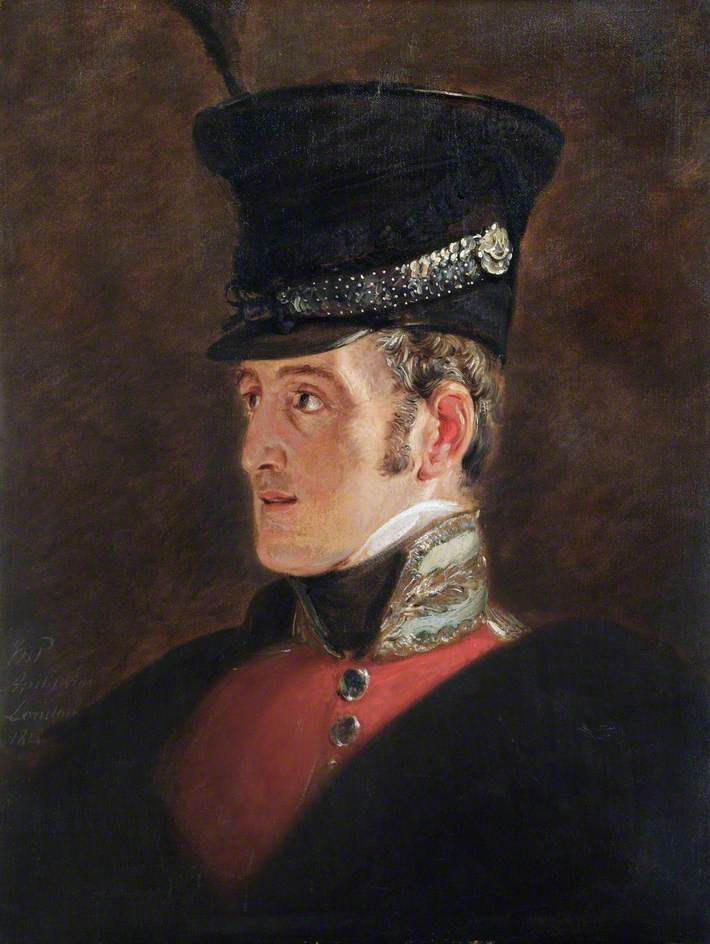
Sir John Colborne, leader of the British forces in Lower Canada during the Rebellion

In the 1830s, political tensions steadily grew in Lower Canada, as the Patriote movement and the Parti Patriote increased their criticisms of the colonial government, with a governor appointed by the British government and an appointed Legislative Council dominated by the British merchant class in the colony. By 1837, rebellion was in the air, following the British government's rejection of proposals for constitutional change set out by the Legislative Assembly of Lower Canada in the Ninety-Two Resolutions.

The commander of the British military forces was Sir John Colborne, a veteran of the Peninsular War and the Battle of Waterloo. He asked Forbes to report to him on possible Patriote activity in the Deux-Montagnes region, north-west of Montreal, which included Carillon. The Deux-Montagnes region was seen as a Patriote hotbed, particularly the towns of Saint-Eustache and Saint-Benoît. In October 1837, Colborne moved a detachment of British soldiers to Carillon, where they were lodged in a large stone building which Forbes owned.

In mid-November, after the Rebellion broke out, Forbes reported to Colborne that "Sedition ... now reigns paramount". Colborne, concerned about the growing numbers of Patriotes, responded by asking Forbes to raise volunteers from the area. Forbes was able to raise 800 volunteers within a week. Although they were placed under the command of a British Army officer, Major Henry Dive Townshend, the volunteers referred to Forbes as "the General".

In early December, Colborne moved into the Deux-Montagnes area with British soldiers. On 14 December 1837, he engaged one of the last groups of armed Patriotes, at Saint-Eustache. The British regulars overcame the Patriotes, at considerable loss of life by the Patriotes and only three British Army casualties. Several buildings were burnt by the soldiers during the battle, including the church.

On 16 December, Colborne and his forces joined Forbes and approximately two hundred of the volunteer group at the neighbouring village of Saint-Benoît. Although the Patriotes surrendered without resistance, the troops set fire to much of the village and plundered it. According to one volunteer who was present, Colborne and Forbes watched "the whole of the troops galloping through the flames ... everybody plundering, bringing hoard, stealing horses, furniture, sleighs, etc." Little was left of the village the next day. The volunteers, and possibly the British regulars, committed similar pillaging in other villages as they returned from Saint-Benoît. One Patriote who was captured by the British forces said that the volunteers were undisciplined and "fanatical partisans or ignorant and uncouth immigrants" who believed they were to be pitiless.

== Member of the Legislative Assembly ==
Following the rebellion in Lower Canada, and the similar rebellion in 1837 in Upper Canada (now Ontario), the British government decided to merge the two provinces into a single province, as recommended by Lord Durham in the Durham Report. The Union Act, 1840, passed by the British Parliament, abolished the two provinces and their separate parliaments. It created the Province of Canada, with a single Parliament for the entire province, composed of an elected Legislative Assembly and an appointed Legislative Council. The Governor General initially retained a strong position in the government.

In the first general elections for the Legislative Assembly in 1841, Forbes stood as a candidate in the Two Mountains constituency. He campaigned in support of the union, but was defeated by Colin Robertson, who also supported the union. However, Robertson died in a sleighing accident the next year. Forbes was elected to the Assembly in 1842, in the resulting by-election.

In the Assembly, he was a traditional Lower Canada Tory, and opposed the political direction of the Executive Council, which was composed largely of Reformers and some moderate Tories. In 1843, when almost all of the members of the Executive Council resigned in a dispute with the Governor General, Sir Charles Metcalfe, Forbes voted in support of Metcalfe in the Legislative Assembly.

Forbes did not stand for re-election in the general elections of 1844.

== Later life and death ==
Forbes lived the life of a Tory squire on his Carillon estate. He was actively engaged in the development of the estate, invested in land, and was involved in various speculative activities. He was a popular host, welcoming a series of visitors of various ranks. In 1837, he had been appointed a justice of the peace, a position he held for the rest of his life.

He died at Carillon in 1862 and was buried from the Anglican church of St. Andrew.
