= Parti canadien (1942) =

Canadian Party Parti canadien
- Former federal party
- Leader: Liguori Lacombe
- Founder: Liguori Lacombe
- Founded: 1942
- Dissolved: c. 1944
- Ideology: Canadian nationalism Isolationism; Anti-conscription; Soft Republicanism

The Parti canadien (Canadian Party) was an anti-conscriptionist party formed by Member of Parliament Liguori Lacombe in 1942. Lacombe was the MP for Laval—Two Mountains. He was an isolationist, who opposed Canada's participation in World War II and the implementation of conscription. Lacombe, a Liberal MP since 1925, quit the Liberal caucus and won re-election in the 1940 federal election as an Independent Liberal before forming the Parti canadien.

Lacombe founded the party in order to oppose Mackenzie King's plan to hold a plebiscite on conscription. Lacombe sat in Parliament as an unofficial representative of the Canadian Party after its formation. In 1942 federal by-elections held in Quebec, two candidates ran under the name "Parti canadien" (Canadian Party) possibly inspired by the pre-Confederation Parti canadien of anti-British nationalists. The party stood candidates against Liberal Louis St. Laurent in Quebec East and Gaspard Fauteux in Montreal St. Mary. Due to a wartime political truce between the Liberal and Conservative parties, the Parti canadien candidates were the primary opponents to the Liberals in these two by-elections. Joseph Raoul Périllard finished second behind Fauteux in St. Mary and Paul Bouchard was St. Laurent's only opponent in Quebec East finishing 4,000 votes behind him.

Lacombe subsequently used the party as a platform to campaign for a "no" vote during the April plebiscite on conscription. In June he invited Quebec Liberal MPs who opposed conscription to join his party but had no takers.

In September 1942 the Bloc populaire canadien was formed. Lacombe worked with, but did not join the new formation which became the primary anti-conscriptionist vehicle in Quebec.

Lacombe subsequently joined the "Independent Group" of anti-conscription MPs led by Frédéric Dorion.
