= Wilfrid Prévost =

Canadian politician

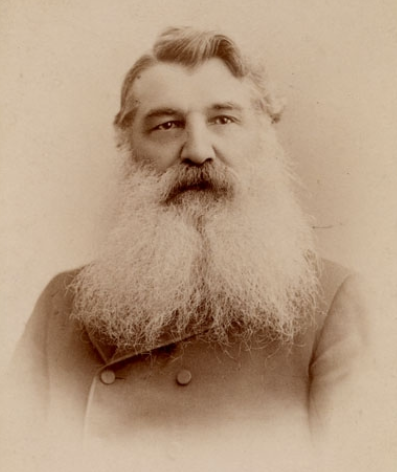

Member of the Canadian Parliament for Two Mountains
- In office 1872–1875
- Preceded by: Jean-Baptiste Daoust
- Succeeded by: Charles Auguste Maximilien Globensky

Member of the Legislative Council of Quebec for Rigaud
- In office 1888–1898
- Preceded by: Eustache Prud'homme
- Succeeded by: Joseph Lanctôt

Personal details
- Born: April 30, 1832 Sainte-Anne-des-Plaines, Lower Canada
- Died: February 15, 1898 (aged 65) Saint-Jérôme, Quebec
- Party: Liberal

Wilfrid Prévost (April 30, 1832 – February 15, 1898) was a lawyer and political figure in Quebec, Canada. He represented Two Mountains in the House of Commons of Canada as a Liberal member from 1872 to 1875.

He was born in Sainte-Anne-des-Plaines, Lower Canada in 1832 and studied at the Collège Saint-Sulpice at Montreal, the Collège de l'Assomption and the Séminaire de Saint-Hyacinthe. Prévost articled in law and was admitted to the bar in 1853. He practiced at Terrebonne, Sainte-Scholastique, Montreal and Saint-Jérôme. He was named Queen's Counsel in 1878. Prevost served several terms as mayor for Sainte-Scholastique and was also warden for Deux-Montagnes County. He was named to the Legislative Council of Quebec for Rigaud division in 1888. He died at Saint-Jérôme in 1898 and was buried at Terrebonne.

His son Jean was a member of the Quebec legislative assembly and served in the provincial cabinet. His older brother Gédéon-Mélasippe served in the legislative assembly of the Province of Canada.

1872 Canadian federal election: Two Mountains
Party	Candidate	Votes
Liberal	Wilfrid Prévost	acclaimed
Source: Canadian Elections Database

1874 Canadian federal election: Two Mountains
Party	Candidate	Votes
Liberal	Wilfrid Prévost	725
Unknown	J. Watts	670
Source: lop.parl.ca

By-election: On election being declared void, 14 January 1875

By-election on 26 February 1875
Party	Candidate	Votes
Independent	Charles-Auguste-Maximilien Globensky	939
Liberal	Wilfrid Prévost	810
