= Joseph Girouard =

Canadian politician (1854–1933)

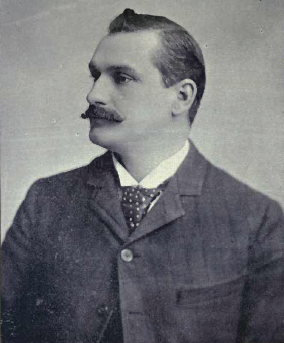
Joseph Girouard

Joseph Girouard (April 8, 1854 – March 29, 1933) was a Quebec notary and political figure. He represented Two Mountains in the House of Commons of Canada as a Conservative member from 1892 to 1896.

He was born at St-Benoît, Canada East in 1854, the son of Jean-Joseph Girouard, and studied at the Collège des Sulpiciens at Montreal. Girouard qualified to practice as a notary in 1877 and set up practice at St-Benoît. He also acted as seigneurial agent for the seigneury of Lac des Deux-Montagnes for the Sulpicians. In 1879, he married Célanire, the daughter of merchant Daniel-Adolphe Plessis-Belair. Girouard was elected to the House of Commons in an 1892 by-election held after the death of Jean-Baptiste Daoust.

== Electoral record ==
By-election on 27 February 1892
Party	Candidate	Votes
Conservative	Joseph Girouard	acclaimed

1896 Canadian federal election: Two Mountains
Party	Candidate	Votes
Liberal	Joseph Arthur Calixte Éthier	1,227
Conservative	Joseph Girouard	1,210

1900 Canadian federal election: Two Mountains
Party	Candidate	Votes
Liberal	Joseph Arthur Calixte Éthier	1,455
Conservative	Joseph Girouard	1,323
