= Colin Robertson (fur trader) =

Canadian fur trader and political figure

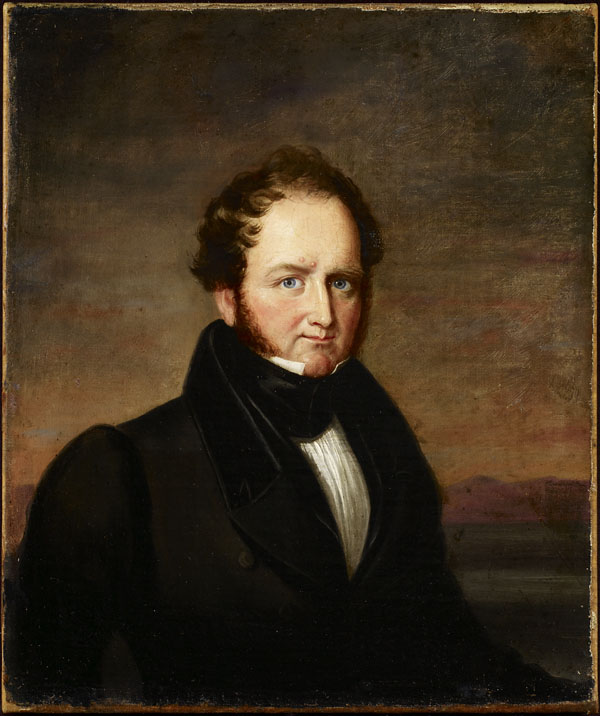

Member of the Legislative Assembly of the Province of Canada for Two Mountains
- In office 1841–1842
- Preceded by: New position
- Succeeded by: Charles John Forbes

Personal details
- Born: July 27, 1783 Perth, Scotland
- Died: February 4, 1842 (aged 58) Montreal, Province of Canada
- Party: Unionist and Tory
- Spouse: Theresa Chalifoux
- Children: At least 1 son

Colin Robertson (July 27, 1783 – February 4, 1842) was an early Canadian fur trader and political figure. Born in Scotland, for much of his adult life he was engaged in the North American fur trade, working at different times for the North West Company and the Hudson's Bay Company. He led the Hudson's Bay Company expedition to Lake Athabasca.

He initially worked for the North West Company. While doing so, he disagreed with his supervisor, John MacDonald of Garth. The two actually fought a duel, after which Robertson switched to working for the Hudson's Bay Company.

The fur trade competition between the two companies was fierce and largely unregulated. When working for the Hudson's Bay Company, Robertson seized the fort of the Nor'Westers in the Red River colony. He later faced criminal charges for this in Lower Canada but a court acquitted him. Then twice he was captured by Samuel Black, an employee of the North West Company, who planned to charge him with attempted murder. Robertson escaped both times, finally fleeing to the United States and returning to England.

After the death of his financial patron, Lord Selkirk, Robertson fled from England to France to avoid imprisonment for debt. He eventually worked out a bankruptcy agreement where he paid his creditors two shillings on the pound, and returned to the fur trade in Canada.

While engaged in the fur trade, Robertson married Theresa Chalifoux, a Métis. Contrary to usual attitudes to such marriages in those days, he treated her with respect and tried to integrate her into the fur-trading social life. They had at least one son, also named Colin, whom Robertson ensured received a good education in England.

Following the merger of the two companies in 1821, Robertson continued to work for the Hudson's Bay Company throughout Rupert's Land and other parts of the Canadian north-west. At the age of 47, in 1832, he had a paralyzing stroke, from which he never fully recovered.

He retired to Montreal in 1840. He was elected to the first Parliament of the Province of Canada in 1841 but died in early 1842 when he was thrown from his sleigh.

== Early life ==
Robertson was born in Perth, Scotland in 1783, the son of William Robertson and Catherine Sharp. The family was engaged in the hand-weaving trade. Robertson was originally apprenticed in Scotland as a hand-weaver, but abandoned his apprenticeship when the trade collapsed from competition by the weaving mills. He emigrated to New York City, where he found work in a grocery store.

By 1803, he was working for the North West Company, a leading fur-trading company based in Montreal. He gained considerable experience about the fur trade, travelling and working in Rupert's Land and Canada's north-west. During his time with the North West Company, he fought a duel with a fellow Nor'Wester, John MacDonald of Garth. In 1809, Robertson left the North West Company and moved to England, where he became a merchant at Liverpool.

== Fur trade in Rupert's Land and the North-western territory ==
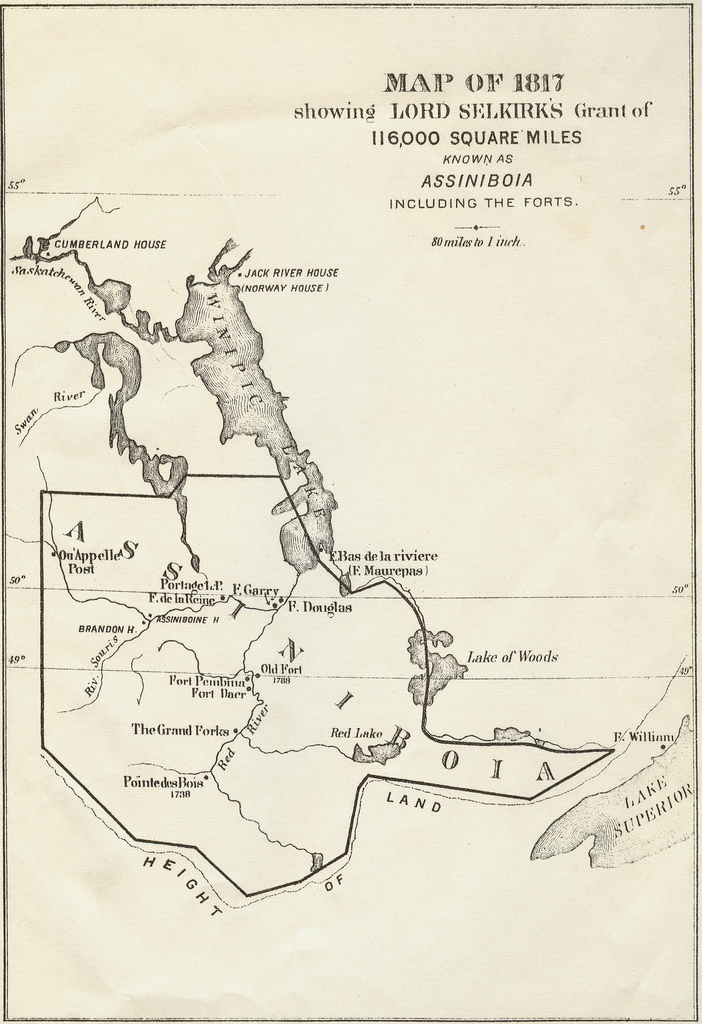
Map of the Red River colony (also called Assiniboia)

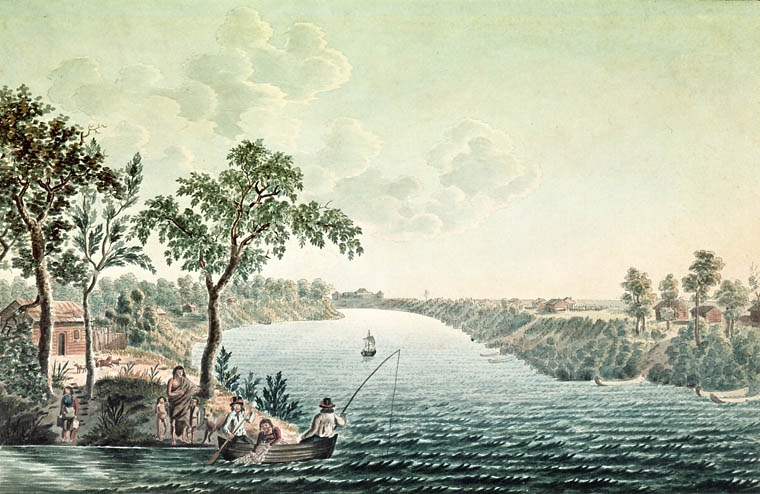
Red River in the summer of 1822; HBC Fort Douglas in the background

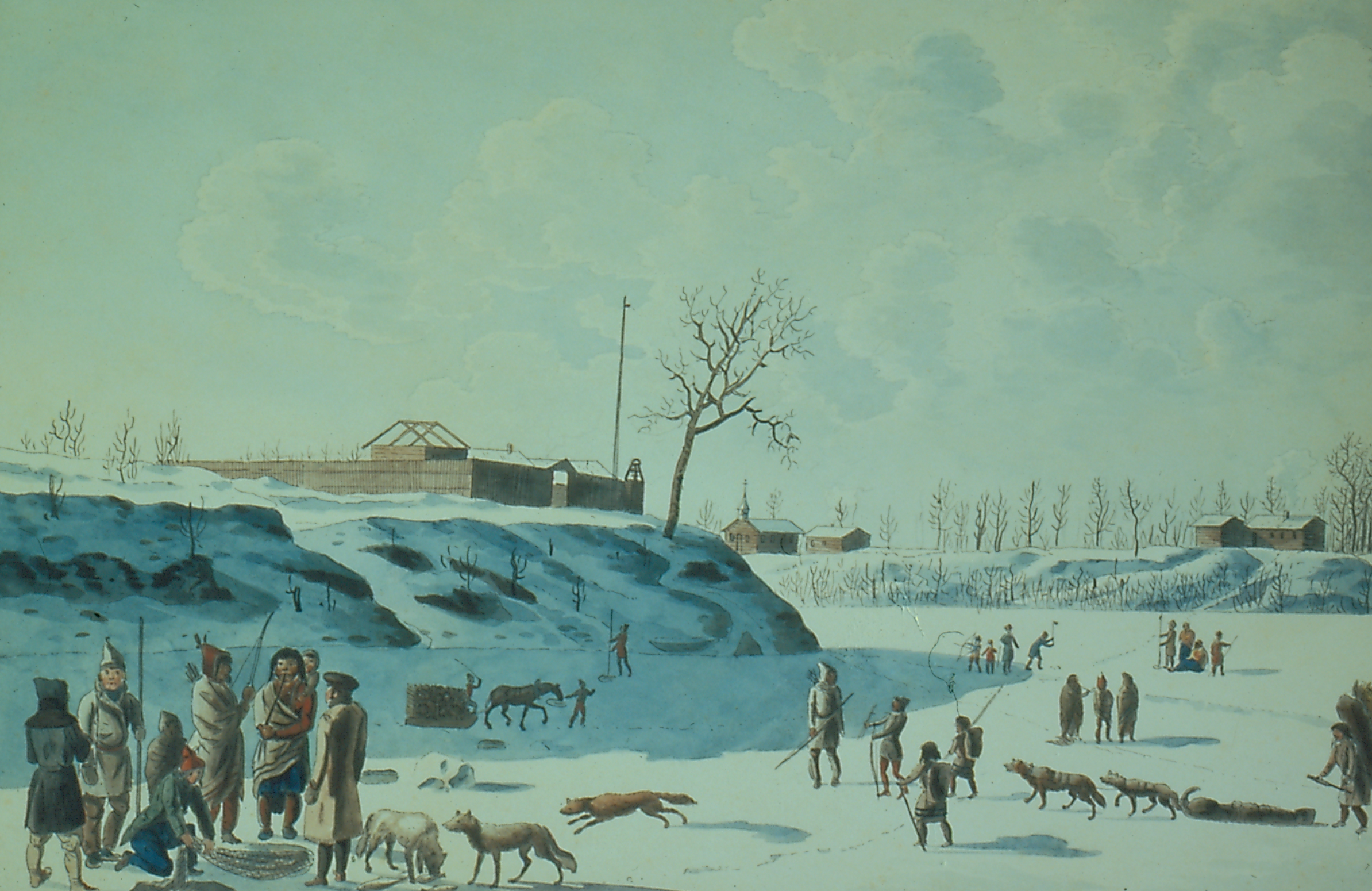
Red River in the winter of 1821, showing Fort Gibraltar

While in England, Robertson approached the management of the Hudson's Bay Company with plans to expand their trading network inland, to the area around Lake Athabasca, putting economic competition on the North West Company. In 1814, he returned to Canada in the employ of the Hudson's Bay Company, with instructions to carry out his plan. He organised the first overland HBC expedition from Montreal to the north-west, leading a large collection of experienced French-Canadian fur-trading voyageurs. Robertson was charismatic, over six feet tall, red-haired, fond of quoting Shakespeare, and with considerable self-confidence and generosity, necessary to lead groups of men in the wilderness of the fur trade. One of his sayings was "When you're with wolves, howl!" He knew the country well, and the practices of the North West Company. He was successful in establishing the HBC in the Athabasca country, which put enough economic pressure on the North West Company that they eventually had to merge with the HBC some years later.

When Robertson arrived in the Red River Colony (now Manitoba) in 1815, he found that the North West Company traders had burnt many of the buildings and driven the Red River settlers away. Robertson led the settlers back to Red River and worked out an accommodation with the Nor'Westers, although he twice seized their fort, Fort Gibraltar, during the negotiations. He also rebuilt the HBC fort, Fort Douglas, which had been burnt down by the Nor'Westers.

Robertson was unable to come to an agreement with Robert Semple, the new governor of Assiniboia, about Robertson's plan to stop the supplies of the Nor'Westers, particularly pemmican, on which the traders depended. Robertson travelled to York Factory on Hudson's Bay, intending to return to England. While waiting for a ship to England, he heard that Semple and twenty of his men had been killed in an affray with the Nor'Westers at the Battle of Seven Oaks, part of the Pemmican War. By August 1817, Robertson was back in Montreal. Jailed for a short time, he stood trial on charges arising from his seizure of Fort Gibraltar. He was acquitted in the spring of 1818.

Robertson then led a new HBC expedition to the Athabasca country. He was taken prisoner twice by Samuel Black of the North West Company, who planned to charge him with attempted murder, but he escaped both times, fled to the United States, and returned to England. Lord Selkirk, who had been guaranteeing Robertson's business debts, had died and Robertson was forced to flee to France to avoid being imprisoned for debt. He went into bankruptcy, paying his creditors two shillings on the pound.

In 1821, the Hudson's Bay Company and the North West Company merged and Robertson became a chief factor in the new company. Now that the two companies were no longer competing, men of action were valued less by the company than those with administrative skills. He held various positions in Rupert's Land and the north-west.

At some point Robertson had married Theresa Chalifoux, a Métis woman. He treated her with respect but the HBC governor, George Simpson, was disdainful of the relationship, based on his racial views. In 1825, Robertson travelled to England to provide for the education of their eldest son, also named Colin. The tension between Robertson and Simpson broke into the open when Robertson tried to introduce his wife into the small social life of the Red River colony in 1831, leading to a major quarrel between the two men.

Robertson planned to retire but in 1832 he had a paralyzing stroke, from which he never fully recovered. He continued to hold down positions with the HBC, intermittently. He received a final payout from the company in 1840, and retired to Montreal.

== Political life ==
In 1837, there were rebellions in both Lower Canada and Upper Canada. The British government decided to merge the two provinces into a single province, as recommended by Lord Durham in the Durham Report. The Union Act, 1840, passed by the British Parliament, abolished the two provinces and their separate parliaments. It created the Province of Canada, with a single Parliament for the entire province, composed of an elected Legislative Assembly and an appointed Legislative Council. The Governor General initially retained a strong position in the government.

The first general elections for the new Legislative Assembly were held in the spring of 1841. Robertson stood for election for the riding of Two Mountains, located in the rural area to the north-west of Montreal. He campaigned in support of the union, as did his opponent, Charles John Forbes. Robertson was elected.

The first session of the new Parliament was convened in Kingston, Upper Canada, in September 1841. The major issue was the response to the union. One of the leaders of the French-Canadian Group, John Neilson, brought a motion which condemned the way the union had been imposed on Lower Canada. Robertson voted against the motion and in favour of the union. Neilson's motion was defeated. Robertson was a consistent supporter of the Governor General, Lord Sydenham, for the rest of the session.

== Death ==
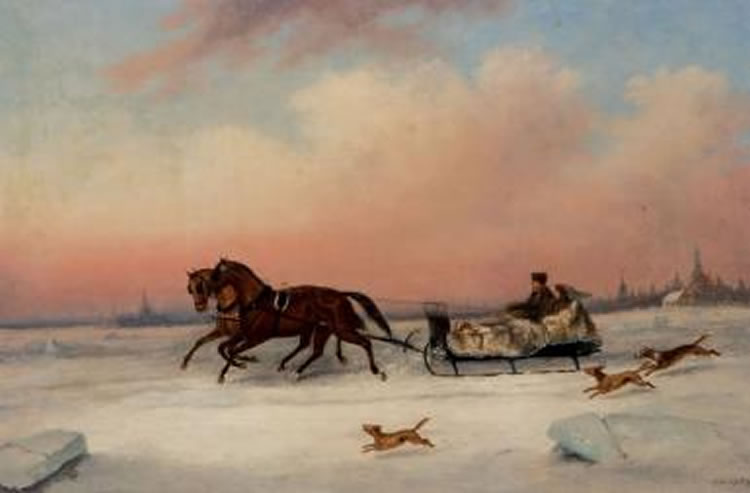
An example of a fast-moving sleigh

Robertson died in Montreal in 1842 after an accident where he was thrown from his sleigh. He did not leave a large estate, having used his pay-out from the Hudson's Bay Company to pay off the mortgage on his house in Montreal, and having spent considerable sums on the election campaign the previous year.

In the resulting by-election, his opponent from the general election, Forbes, was elected.

== Legacy ==
Mount Robson, on the border between British Columbia and Alberta, is likely named for him.

== Works ==
- E. E. Rich (ed.), Colin Robertson's Correspondence Book, September 1817-September 1822 (Toronto: Champlain Society Publications, 1939).
- Rich, E., ed. (1939). Colin Robertson's Correspondence Book, September 1817 to September 1822: The Publications of the Champlain Society, Hudson's Bay Company Series. Toronto: Champlain Society Publications. doi:10.3138/9781442618367. ISBN 978-1-4426-1836-7.

== See also ==
- 1st Parliament of the Province of Canada
