= Jean-Olivier Chénier =

Canadian physician (born 1806)

Jean-Olivier Chénier (December 9, 1806 – December 14, 1837) was a medical doctor and revolutionary in Lower Canada (present-day Quebec). Born in Lachine (or maybe Montreal). During the Lower Canada Rebellion, he commanded the Patriote forces in the Battle of Saint-Eustache. Trapped with his men in a church by the government troops who set fire to the building, he was shot to death while attempting to escape through a window. He died to shouts of "Remember Weir!", a reference to George Weir, a government spy executed by the Patriotes. The government forces mutilated Chénier's corpse to intimidate the remaining Patriote supporters:

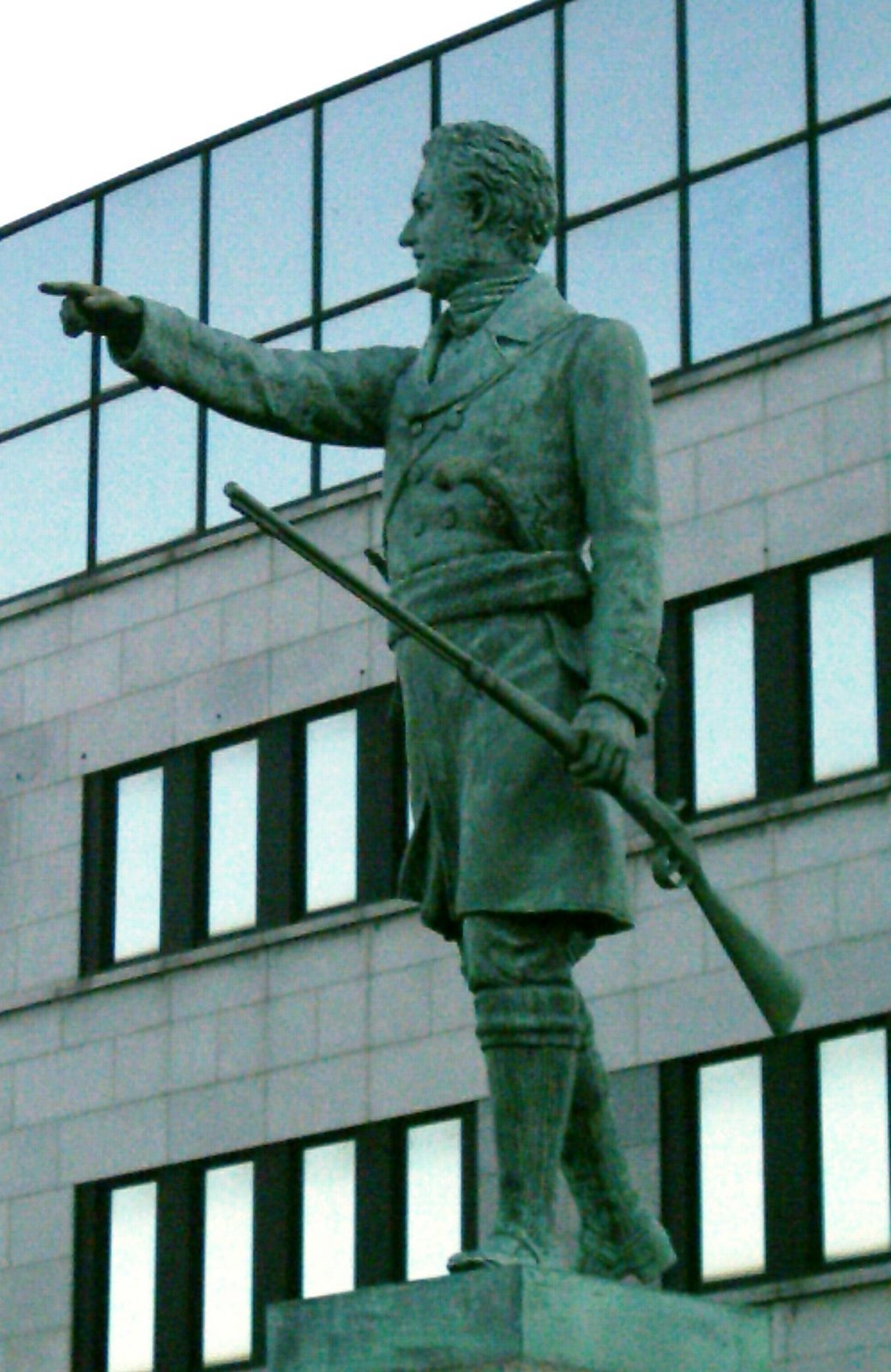
Statue of Chénier in a park adjacent to rue Saint-Denis in Montréal

Chénier was found about six o'clock and taken to Addison's Inn where his body suffered indignities which those present called an autopsy. During the three days the body was left exposed, a witness swore he had seen it stretched out on the tavern bar: "The chest was opened and the heart hung outside it. To a passing Patriote they cried: 'Come see your Chénier's rotten heart!' ...I noticed that rifle blows had left his head covered with clots of blood." A correspondent for Le Canadien, also an eyewitness, wrote in his diary: "We were in Saint-Eustache last Sunday. The dead had been left lying about. Chénier was on the counter, so badly mutilated that he was almost cut into four pieces, his heart on the outside. A sickening spectacle to witness."

— Géraid Filteau, Histoire des Patriotes, Éditions l'Aurore/Univers, 1980, p. 370

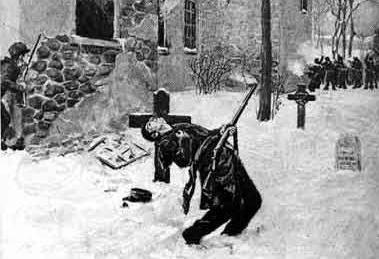
The death of Chénier.

Chénier was excommunicated from the Roman Catholic religion until 1945. The name was condemned because Jean-Olivier Chénier fought on holy ground inside a church. The Chénier park in the Bas-St-Laurent was renamed after the excommunication of the family. The excommunicated family moved to Hawkesbury, Ontario.

There is a statue of Jean-Olivier Chénier in St-Eustache in remembrance of those who died in the fire of 1837. Another used to be situated on St. Denis Street in downtown Montréal. However, this statue was removed at about the same time when the new Université de Montréal Health Centre was inaugurated, in 2016, in 2021.

Chénier Street in Montreal is named for him, as is the Jean-Olivier-Chénier Section of the Saint-Jean-Baptiste Society of Montreal. The Chénier Cell of the Front de libération du Québec (FLQ), held responsible for the killing of Pierre Laporte, was also named for him.

CLSC Jean Olivier Chénier on Oka Road in Saint-Eustache, Quebec, was also named after Chénier.

A daycare centre situated in Saint-Eustache is named "Les petits Patriotes" ("The Little Patriots").

== See also ==
- Patriote movement
- Quebec nationalism
- Quebec independence movement
- History of Quebec
- Timeline of Quebec history
