= Liguori Lacombe =

Canadian politician (1895–1957)

Joseph-Roméo-Liguori Lacombe (June 17, 1895 – April 13, 1957), generally known as Liguori Lacombe, was a Member of Parliament in the House of Commons of Canada from 1925 to 1930 and again from 1935 to 1948. He is best known for having quit the Liberal Party of Canada because of his isolationist opposition to Canada's entry into World War II and for campaigning against the government during the Conscription Crisis of 1944.

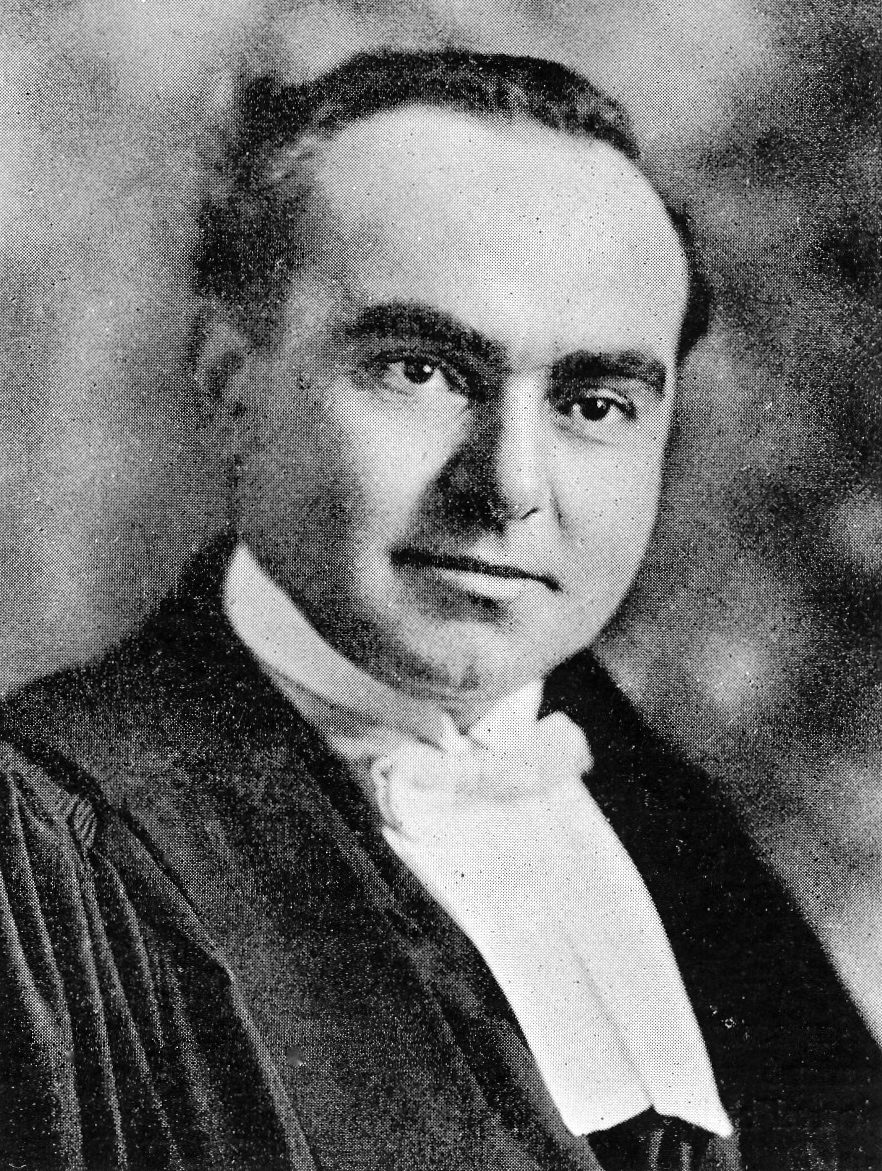
Portrait of Liguori Lacombe

== Early life and career ==
Lacombe was born and raised in Sainte-Scholastique, Quebec. He studied law at the University of Montreal and began his practice in 1923 working out of law offices in both Sainte-Scholastique and Montreal. He earned fame for his involvement in several high-profile murder cases.

== Political career ==
Lacombe was first elected to parliament as the Liberal MP for Laval—Two Mountains, Quebec, in the 1925 federal election. He was re-elected in 1926 but defeated by former Quebec Conservative Party leader Arthur Sauvé in the 1930 federal election.

Lacombe returned to parliament as a Liberal in the 1935 federal election defeating federal Minister of Marine and Fisheries Lucien Henri Gendron, who had opted to run in Laval—Two Mountains after Sauvé was appointed to the Senate of Canada.

=== Opposition to World War II ===
On September 10, 1939, Lacombe broke with the Liberal Party to vote against Canada's entry into World War II. He and fellow maverick Liberal Édouard Lacroix introduced an amendment calling for "non-participation" in the war, which reflected some reluctance by French Canadians to join Britain in war. The two MPs, who proved to be the amendment's only supporters, were condemned in a Globe and Mail editorial the following day as "two French-Canadians who gained eternal distinction by an attitude unworthy of their people and country."

He stood as an "Independent Liberal" in the 1940 federal election and was re-elected by defeating the official Liberal nominee by almost 2,000 votes.

Later that year, Lacombe and Lacroix attempted to lead a revolt of Quebec MPs against the National Resources Mobilization Act. The bill gave the government emergency powers to mobilize resources, including manpower for the war effort; called up all men between the ages of 19 and 45 for a thirty-day training period; and required everyone over the age of 16 to register with the government in preparation for a possible draft. Lacombe and Lacroix moved an amendment that would have substituted the measures of the act with a statement that Canadian participation in the war must be free, voluntary, and moderate. The government responded during the debate by insisting that the measures were for home defence only and that there would be no conscription for overseas service.

In 1942, Liguiori formed the Parti Canadien to run candidates in two federal by-elections on a platform opposing the imposition of conscription and to oppose Prime Minister William Lyon Mackenzie King's plan to hold a plebiscite on conscription. The party stood candidates against Liberal Louis St. Laurent in Quebec East and Gaspard Fauteux in Montreal St. Mary and did well enough to inspire other anti-conscriptionists to form the Bloc populaire later that year.

Lacombe used the party as a platform to campaign for a "no" vote during the April 1942 plebiscite on conscription. In June, he invited Quebec Liberal MPs who opposed conscription to join his party but had no takers and so he remained the party's sole MP.

He subsequently was part of an unofficial "Independents Group" of five anti-conscription MPs led by Frédéric Dorion.

=== Later political career ===
In the weeks before the 1945 federal election, Lacombe and the other members of the Independents Group led by Dorion joined with former Liberal cabinet minister Pierre Joseph Arthur Cardin, who had quit the Mackenzie King cabinet in 1942 over the issue of conscription, to form the "National Front" which was to be a united nationalist party. However, Cardin dropped the National Front project a month before the election after several nationalist candidates and groups failed to join. However, Lacombe was re-elected an Independent MP by defeating his Liberal opponent by 300 votes.

He resigned from the House of Commons in 1948 to accept an appointment as district magistrate by the provincial government of Maurice Duplessis.

Lacombe also served as mayor of Sainte-Scholastique from 1935 to 1948.
