= Arthur Sauvé =

Canadian politician (1874–1944)

The Hon. Arthur Sauvé
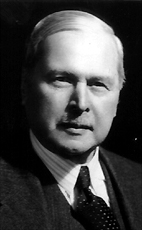

Senator for Rigaud, Quebec
- In office 1935–1944
- Appointed by: R. B. Bennett
- Preceded by: Lawrence Alexander Wilson
- Succeeded by: Vincent Dupuis

Member of the Canadian Parliament for Laval—Two Mountains
- In office 1930–1935
- Preceded by: Liguori Lacombe
- Succeeded by: Liguori Lacombe

Member of the Legislative Assembly of Quebec for Deux-Montagnes
- In office 1908–1930
- Preceded by: Hector Champagne
- Succeeded by: Paul Sauvé

Leader of the Opposition of Quebec
- In office 1916–1929
- Preceded by: Philémon Cousineau
- Succeeded by: Camillien Houde

Personal details
- Born: October 1, 1874 Saint-Hermas (Mirabel), Quebec
- Died: February 6, 1944 (aged 69) Montreal, Quebec
- Party: Conservative
- Other political affiliations: Conservative Party of Quebec
- Spouse: Marie-Louise Lachaine (m. 1899)
- Children: 4, including Paul Sauvé

Arthur Sauvé, PC (French pronunciation: [aʁtyʁ sove]; October 1, 1874 – February 6, 1944) was born in Saint-Hermas (today part of Mirabel, Quebec).

The Legislative Assembly of Quebec member for Deux-Montagnes from 1908 to 1930, he was leader of the Quebec Conservative Party but never premier.

In 1930 he moved to federal politics and became Postmaster General in the Cabinet of Richard Bennett until 1935. In 1935 he was appointed to the Senate.

He was also the mayor of the municipality of Saint-Benoît from 1906 to 1923.

== Elections as party leader ==
Quebec: He lost the 1919 election, 1923 election, and 1927 election.

== Personal life ==
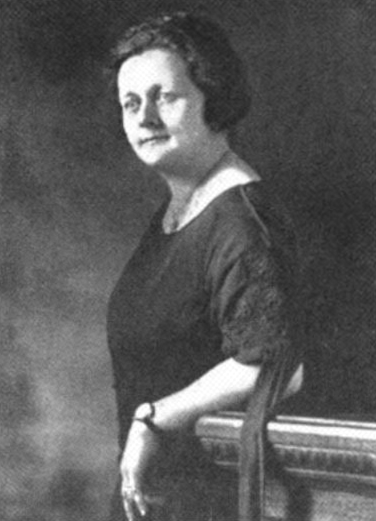
Marie-Louise Lachaine

He married Marie-Louise Lachaine on October 9, 1899, and they had four children, including future premier Paul Sauvé.

Arthur Sauvé died in Montreal on February 6, 1944.

== See also ==
- Politics of Quebec
- List of Quebec general elections
- List of Quebec leaders of the Opposition
- Timeline of Quebec history
