= Battle of Saint-Eustache =

1837 decisive battle in Lower Canada Rebellion

- Part of the Lower Canada Rebellion
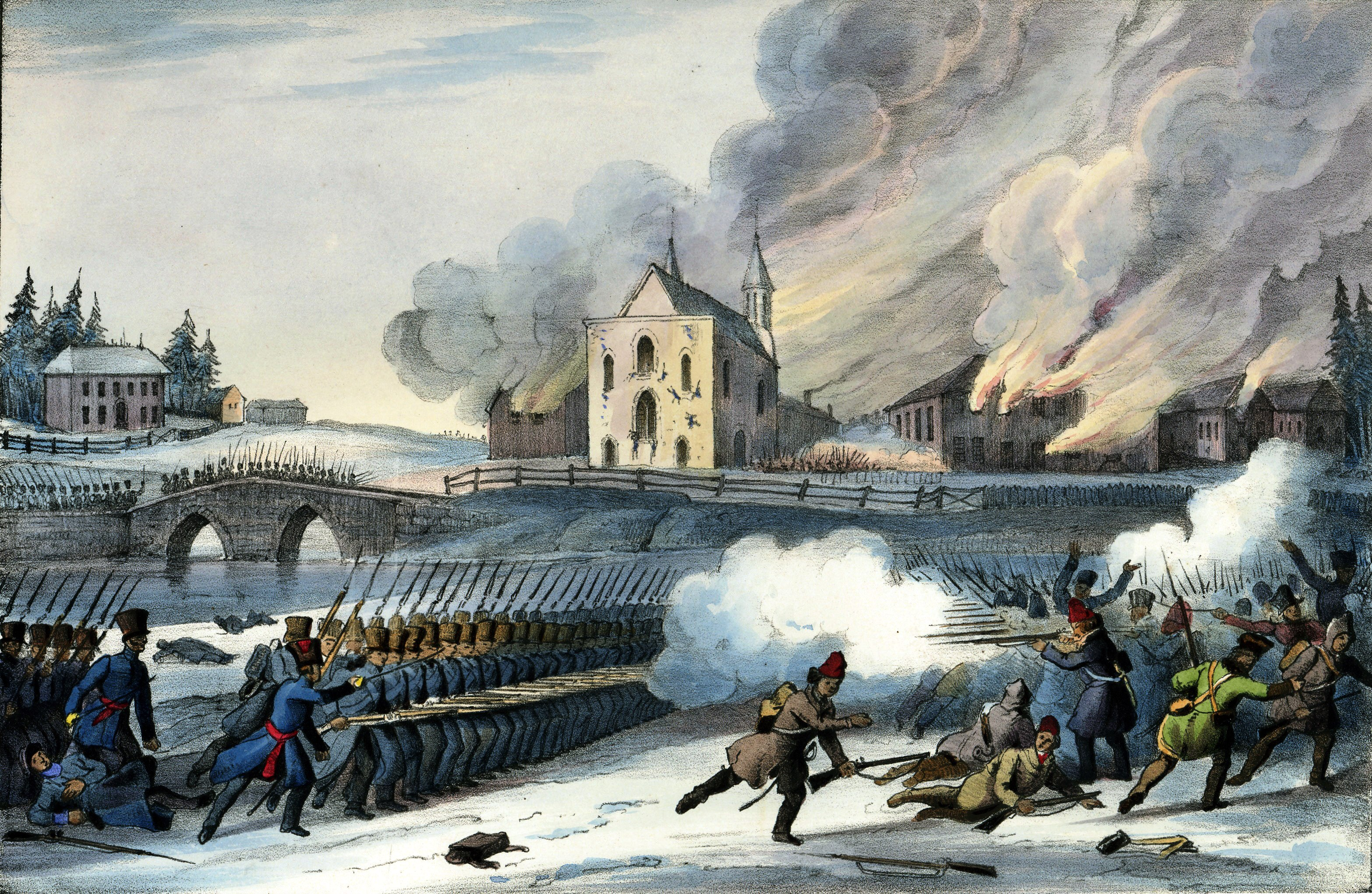
- Battle of Saint-Eustache, Charles Beauclerk
| Date | December 14, 1837 |
| Location | Saint-Eustache, Quebec, Lower Canada 45.5575°N 73.8897°W |
| Result | Government victory |

Belligerents
| United Kingdom | Patriotes |

Commanders and leaders
| John Colborne; Maximilien Globensky | Jean Chénier † |

Strength
| 1,500 | 200 |

Casualties and losses
| 3 killed | 70 killed 120 captured |

The Battle of Saint-Eustache was a decisive battle in the Lower Canada Rebellion in which government forces defeated the principal remaining Patriotes camp at Saint-Eustache on December 14, 1837.

== Prelude ==
After the victory at Saint-Charles, the government forces were in a position to prepare attacks on Patriote camps to the north, including those at Saint-Benoît and Saint-Eustache. The government force, led by John Colborne, numbered 1,280 regular soldiers from the 1st and 32nd Regiments of Foot and reinforced by the newly arrived 83rd Regiment of Foot, supported by artillery and 220 Loyalist volunteers. The Patriote organization was primitive; many members did not even have firearms. They thought they could get 800 combatants, but eventually fielded only 201 men, led by Jean-Olivier Chénier and Amury Girod. They lay barricaded in the convent, the church, the rectory and the manor in the centre of the village.

Amury Girod left as the skirmish was sparked, supposedly to get reinforcements at Saint-Benoît. Suspected of treason, fellow Patriotes went after him, and he would eventually commit suicide.

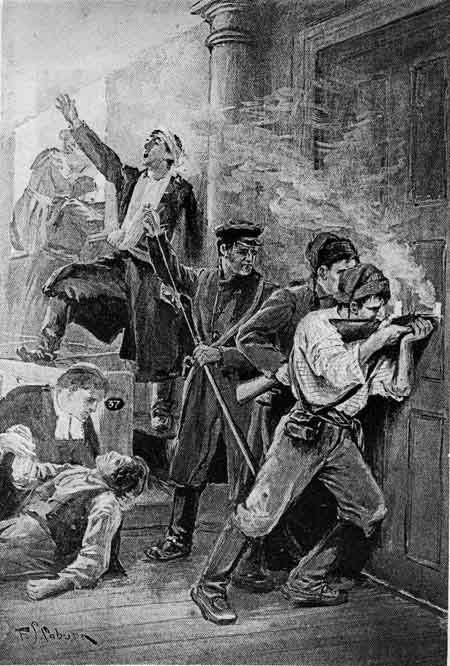
Defenders take refuge in the church of Saint-Eustache (F.S. Coburn illustration from The Habitant and Other Poems by William Henry Drummond)

== Battle ==
At the battle site, Colborne placed his troops around the village and had his soldiers advance systematically to tighten the vice on the defenders. Towards noon, he ordered the artillery to open fire on the centre of the village and then to advance up the main street and break down the doors of the church, where many Patriotes had taken refuge. Two companies of the 1st Regiment of Foot were able to take the rectory nearby, and they set it on fire so that the smoke would make it difficult for those defending the church to see. The grenadiers of the 1st Regiment of Foot then took the manor and set it on fire as well. They were then able to enter the church through the vestry, which they also torched prior to withdrawing under the fire of the Patriotes in the balcony. Caught in the burning church, the Patriotes tried to get out by jumping from the windows, where Jean-Olivier Chénier finally attempted an escape. However, he was swiftly killed. The government forces fired at the rebels as they jumped out the windows to escape the fire. At this point the government troops made a final assault in a merciless struggle. This disastrous battle for the Patriotes lasted at least 4 hours; 70 Patriotes were killed, against only three government soldiers.

== Aftermath ==
In the days that followed, soldiers and volunteers scoured the county of Deux-Montagnes. Saint-Eustache and Saint-Benoît were burned in a fire. In Saint-Joachim, Sainte-Scholastique and Sainte-Thérèse, the army burned the houses of the rebellion's leaders.

Some of the rebels tried to make it to the Canada–US border, but hundreds were taken prisoner. Patriote leaders Dr. Wolfred Nelson and the journalist Jean-Philippe Boucher-Belleville were among them. Some were taken to the penal colony of New South Wales in Australia. The suburb of Canada Bay in Sydney is named for these prisoners who helped build the area.

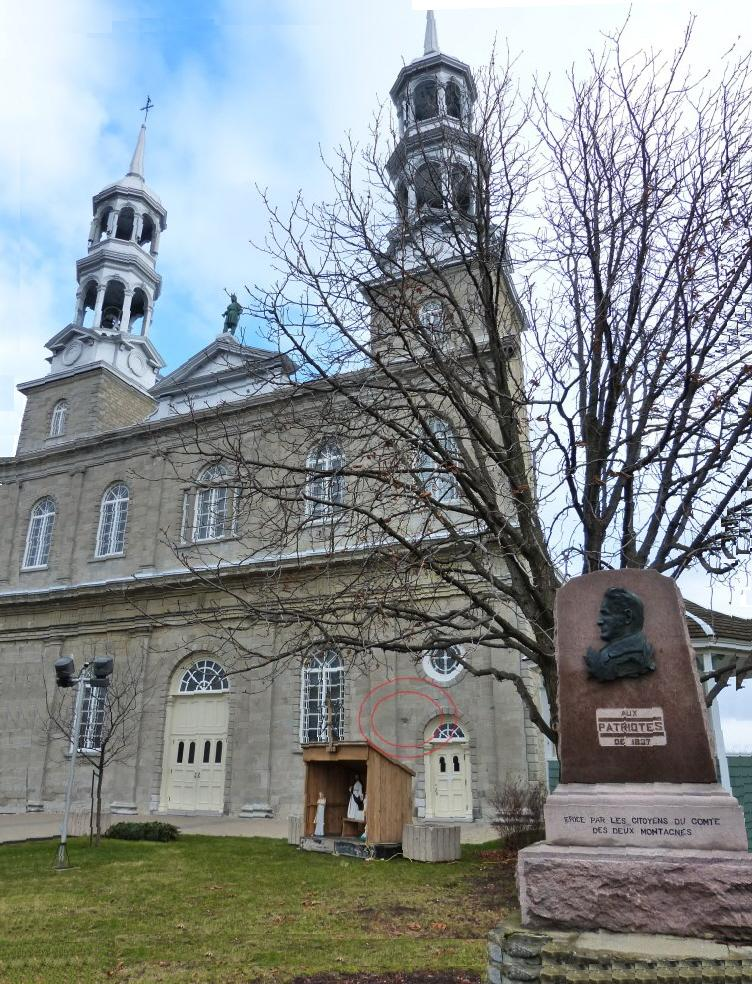
The damaged façade of the church

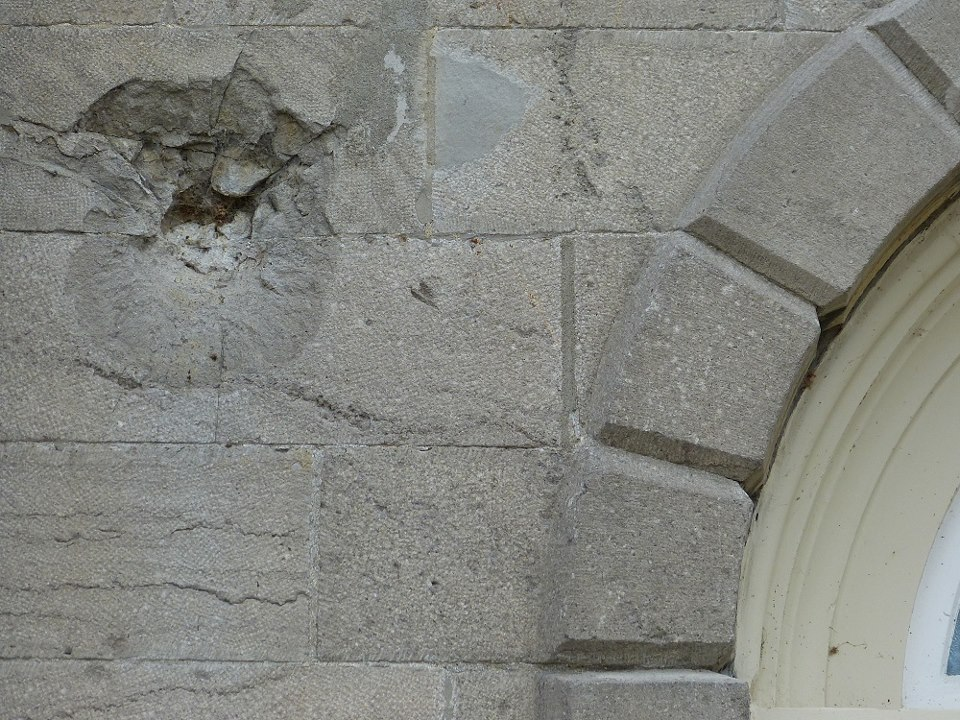
Detail

== See also ==
- Buck Choquette
- Battle of Saint-Charles
- Battle of Saint-Denis (1837)

== Note ==
The church was burnt and destroyed, except for the facade, which still exists. The rest of the church has been rebuilt. The facade still shows the marks of British cannon impacts.
