= Charles-Auguste-Maximilien Globensky =

Canadian politician

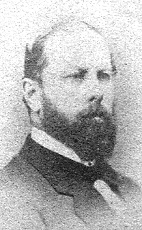
Charles-August-Maximilien Globensky, Member of Parliament, Deux-Montagnes, 1875

Charles-Auguste-Maximilien (C.A.M.) Globensky (November 15, 1830 – February 12, 1906) was a writer and politician. C.A.M. Globensky was the grandson of August Franz Globensky, a Polish surgeon who fought alongside Hessian mercenaries for the British during the American Revolutionary war, settling in Verchères, Quebec, and the son of Lieutenant-Colonel Maximilien Globensky.

== Career ==
He was born in Saint-Eustache, Lower Canada and was educated at the Seminaire de Ste-Therese and the College de Montreal. Globensky was seigneur of Milles-Isles.

An expert in agriculture, C.A.M. Globensky published a number of articles on the subject and was president of the Agricultural Society of Two Mountains.

In 1854, he married Virginia Marguerite Dumont.

In 1868 and 1869 he wrote a series of articles on the development of railways in Quebec. Beginning in 1873, he published widely read political articles in Le Monde and La Minerve. In 1883 he published a book, La Rébellion de 1837 à Saint-Eustache, dedicated to defending the memory of his father against accusations of not supporting the Patriotes in the 1837 Rebellion as well as providing a political analysis of the uprising.

In an 1875 by-election, he sought a seat in the House of Commons of Canada as an Independent representing Two Mountains. During the election campaign, the loyalist sympathies of his family were the subject of debate, but he was elected nevertheless. Disliking politics, he resigned his office the following year. In 1888 he was offered a seat in the Senate of Canada but declined.

Globensky also served as mayor of Saint-Eustache.

He died in Saint-Eustache at the age of 75.

Today, his home located at 233 rue Saint-Eustache in Saint-Eustache, Quebec, is home to a museum displaying information about and relics from the Battle of Saint-Eustache in 1837.

Parliament of Canada
Preceded by Wilfrid Prévost	Member of Parliament from Two Mountains; 1875–1876	Succeeded by Jean-Baptiste Daoust
