= D'Aoust =

Daoust or D'Aoust is a French surname and may refer to:

== People ==
- Charles Daoust (1825–1868), Canadian politician
- Jean-Baptiste Daoust (1817–1891), MP for Deux-Montagnes, Quebec, Canada
- Mélodie Daoust (born 1992), Canadian hockey player
- Sévère D'Aoust, first colonizer of Sarsfield, Ontario, Canada
- Sylvia Daoust (1902–2004), Canadian sculptor
- Dan Daoust (born 1960), Canadian ice hockey player

== Other ==
- Daoust's Corner, former name of Sarsfield, Ontario, Canada
- Daoust Lestage, a Canadian architectural firm
