= Jean-Baptiste Daoust =

Canadian politician

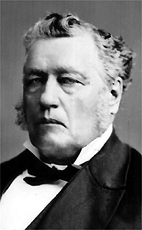
Jean-Baptiste Daoust (1817-1891)

Jean-Baptiste Daoust (18 January 1817 – 28 December 1891) was a Quebec farmer and political figure. He represented Two Mountains (Deux-Montagnes) in the House of Commons of Canada as a Conservative member from 1867 to 1872 and from 1876 to 1891.

He was born in St-Eustache, Lower Canada in 1817. He was elected to the Legislative Assembly of the Province of Canada for Deux-Montagnes in 1854 as a Reformer and served until his resignation in 1866. He was prefect for the county of Deux-Montagnes for several years and also served as commissioner for the small claims court. Daoust also served as lieutenant in the local militia. In 1867, he was elected to the 1st Canadian Parliament but did not run in 1872 or 1874. He served as deputy warden for penitentiaries in Quebec from 1872 to 1875. He was elected again in an 1876 by-election after the sitting member resigned and continued to be reelected until he died in office in 1891.

== Electoral record ==
1867 Canadian federal election: Two Mountains
Party	Candidate	Votes
Conservative	Jean-Baptiste Daoust	acclaimed
Source: Canadian Elections Database

By-election on 11 March 1876
Party	Candidate	Votes
Conservative	Jean-Baptiste Daoust	acclaimed

According to Canadian Directory of Parliament, 1867–1967, p. 234., this by-election did not occur and Mr. Globensky sat until the dissolution of the 3rd Parliament.

1878 Canadian federal election: Two Mountains
Party	Candidate	Votes
Conservative	Jean-Baptiste Daoust	797
Unknown	J. A. Chagnon	11

1882 Canadian federal election: Two Mountains
Party	Candidate	Votes
Conservative	Jean-Baptiste Daoust	acclaimed

1887 Canadian federal election: Two Mountains
Party	Candidate	Votes
Conservative	Jean-Baptiste Daoust	1,091
Liberal	David Marcil	1,019

1891 Canadian federal election: Two Mountains
Party	Candidate	Votes
Conservative	Jean-Baptiste Daoust	1,158
Liberal	L. A. Fortier	871

== See also ==
- Daoust

Parliament of Canada
Preceded by None	Member of Parliament from Two Mountains; 1867–1872	Succeeded by Wilfrid Prévost
Preceded by Charles Auguste Maximilien Globensky	Member of Parliament from Two Mountains; 1876–1891	Succeeded by Joseph Girouard
