= Laval—Two Mountains =

Former federal electoral district in Quebec, Canada

Quebec electoral district

Defunct federal electoral district
- Legislature: House of Commons
- District created: 1914
- District abolished: 1947
- First contested: 1917
- Last contested: 1945

Laval—Two Mountains (French: Laval—Deux-Montagnes) was a federal electoral district in the province of Quebec, Canada that was represented in the House of Commons of Canada from 1917 to 1949.

This riding was created in 1914 from Laval and Two Mountains ridings.

It initially consisted of:

- All the parishes, municipalities and towns comprised in the electoral district of Laval and situated on Isle Jésus, and
- the electoral district of Two Mountains.

In 1924, it was defined as consisting of the Counties of Laval and Two Mountains.

In 1933, it was redefined as consisting of:

- the county of Laval, excluding the municipalities of Pont-des-Rapides; and
- the county of Two-Mountains, excluding the part north of the North River comprised in the municipality of St-Colomban and the northern part of the municipality of St-Canut.

The riding was abolished in 1947 when it was redistributed between Laval and Argenteuil—Deux-Montagnes ridings.

== Members of Parliament ==
This riding elected the following members of Parliament:

Parliament	Years	Member	Party
Laval—Two Mountains; Riding created from Laval and Two Mountains
13th	1917–1921	Joseph Arthur Calixte Éthier	Opposition (Laurier Liberals)
14th	1921–1925	Joseph Arthur Calixte Éthier	Liberal
15th	1925–1926	Liguori Lacombe	Liberal
16th	1926–1930	Liguori Lacombe	Liberal
17th	1930–1930	Arthur Sauvé	Conservative
17th	1930–1935	Arthur Sauvé	Conservative
18th	1935–1940	Liguori Lacombe	Liberal
19th	1940–1945	Liguori Lacombe	Independent Liberal
20th	1945–1948	Liguori Lacombe	Independent
20th	1948–1949	Léopold Demers	Liberal
Riding dissolved into Laval and Argenteuil—Deux-Montagnes

== Election results ==
1917 Canadian federal election
Party	Candidate	Votes
Opposition (Laurier Liberals)	Joseph Arthur Calixte Éthier	acclaimed

1921 Canadian federal election
Party	Candidate	Votes
Liberal	Joseph Arthur Calixte Éthier	6,040
Independent	Aglibert Théoret	3,479
Independent	Joseph Azarie Bibeau	539

1925 Canadian federal election
Party	Candidate	Votes
Liberal	Liguori Lacombe	5,717
Conservative	Alban Germain	3,634
Liberal	Joseph Azarie Bibeau	768

1926 Canadian federal election
Party	Candidate	Votes
Liberal	Liguori Lacombe	5,916
Conservative	Joseph-Horace Michaud	2,148

1930 Canadian federal election
Party	Candidate	Votes
Conservative	Arthur Sauvé	6,601
Liberal	Liguori Lacombe	5,634

By-election: On Mr. Sauvé accepting an office of emolument under the Crown, 7 August 1930

Canadian federal by-election, 25 August 1930
Party	Candidate	Votes
Conservative	Arthur Sauvé	acclaimed

1935 Canadian federal election
Party	Candidate	Votes
Liberal	Liguori Lacombe	6,551
Conservative	Lucien Henri Gendron	4,987

1940 Canadian federal election
Party	Candidate	Votes
Independent Liberal	Liguori Lacombe	6,378
Liberal	Jean-Baptiste-Léo Rochon	4,552

1945 Canadian federal election
Party	Candidate	Votes
Independent	Liguori Lacombe	6,876
Liberal	Joseph Ouimet	6,577

By-election: On Mr. Lacombe's resignation, 12 July 1948

By-election on 20 December 1948
Party	Candidate	Votes
Liberal	Léopold Demers	6,280
Unknown	Honoré Désy	3,287

== See also ==
- List of Canadian electoral districts
- Historical federal electoral districts of Canada
