= Two Mountains (electoral district) =

Former federal electoral district in Quebec, Canada

Quebec electoral district

Defunct federal electoral district
- Legislature: House of Commons
- District created: 1867
- District abolished: 1914
- First contested: 1867
- Last contested: 1911

Two Mountains (French: Deux-Montagnes) was a federal electoral district in Quebec, Canada, that was represented in the House of Commons of Canada from 1867 to 1917.

It was created by the British North America Act, 1867. The electoral district was abolished in 1914 when it was merged into Laval—Two Mountains riding.

== Members of Parliament ==
This riding elected the following members of Parliament:

Parliament	Years	Member	Party
Two Mountains
1st	1867–1872	Jean-Baptiste Daoust	Conservative
2nd	1872–1874	Wilfrid Prévost	Liberal
3rd	1874–1875	Wilfrid Prévost	Liberal
3rd	1875–1876	Charles-Auguste-Maximilien Globensky	Independent
3rd	1876–1878	Jean-Baptiste Daoust	Conservative
4th	1878–1882	Jean-Baptiste Daoust	Conservative
5th	1882–1887	Jean-Baptiste Daoust	Conservative
6th	1887–1891	Jean-Baptiste Daoust	Conservative
7th	1891–1891	Jean-Baptiste Daoust	Conservative
7th	1892–1896	Joseph Girouard	Conservative
8th	1896–1900	Joseph Arthur Calixte Éthier	Liberal
9th	1900–1902	Joseph Arthur Calixte Éthier	Liberal
9th	1903–1904	Joseph Arthur Calixte Éthier	Liberal
10th	1904–1908	Joseph Arthur Calixte Éthier	Liberal
11th	1908–1911	Joseph Arthur Calixte Éthier	Liberal
12th	1911–1917	Joseph Arthur Calixte Éthier	Liberal
Riding dissolved into Laval—Two Mountains

== Election results ==
1867 Canadian federal election
Party	Candidate	Votes
Conservative	Jean-Baptiste Daoust	acclaimed
Source: Canadian Elections Database

1872 Canadian federal election
Party	Candidate	Votes
Liberal	Wilfrid Prévost	acclaimed
Source: Canadian Elections Database

1874 Canadian federal election
Party	Candidate	Votes
Liberal	Wilfrid Prévost	725
Unknown	J. Watts	670
Source: lop.parl.ca

By-election: On election being declared void, 14 January 1875

By-election on 26 February 1875
Party	Candidate	Votes
Independent	Charles-Auguste-Maximilien Globensky	939
Liberal	Wilfrid Prévost	810

By-election: On Mr. Globensky's resignation

By-election on 11 March 1876
Party	Candidate	Votes
Conservative	Jean-Baptiste Daoust	acclaimed

According to Canadian Directory of Parliament, 1867–1967, p. 234., this by-election did not occur and Mr. Globensky sat until the dissolution of the 3rd Parliament.

1878 Canadian federal election
Party	Candidate	Votes
Conservative	Jean-Baptiste Daoust	797
Unknown	J. A. Chagnon	11

1882 Canadian federal election
Party	Candidate	Votes
Conservative	Jean-Baptiste Daoust	acclaimed

1887 Canadian federal election
Party	Candidate	Votes
Conservative	Jean-Baptiste Daoust	1,091
Liberal	David Marcil	1,019

1891 Canadian federal election
Party	Candidate	Votes
Conservative	Jean-Baptiste Daoust	1,158
Liberal	L. A. Fortier	871

By-election: On Mr. Daoust's death, 28 December 1891

By-election on 27 February 1892
Party	Candidate	Votes
Conservative	Joseph Girouard	acclaimed

1896 Canadian federal election
Party	Candidate	Votes
Liberal	Joseph Arthur Calixte Éthier	1,227
Conservative	Joseph Girouard	1,210

1900 Canadian federal election
Party	Candidate	Votes
Liberal	Joseph Arthur Calixte Éthier	1,455
Conservative	Joseph Girouard	1,323

By-election: On election being declared void, 6 August 1902

By-election on 24 February 1903
Party	Candidate	Votes
Liberal	Joseph Arthur Calixte Éthier	1,392
Conservative	Benjamin Beauchamp	1,268

1904 Canadian federal election
Party	Candidate	Votes
Liberal	Joseph Arthur Calixte Éthier	1,460
Conservative	George N. Fauteux	1,333

1908 Canadian federal election
Party	Candidate	Votes
Liberal	Joseph Arthur Calixte Éthier	1,427
Conservative	Guillaume-André Fauteux	1,335

1911 Canadian federal election
Party	Candidate	Votes
Liberal	Joseph Arthur Calixte Éthier	acclaimed

== See also ==
- List of Canadian electoral districts
- Historical federal electoral districts of Canada
