= August Franz Globensky =

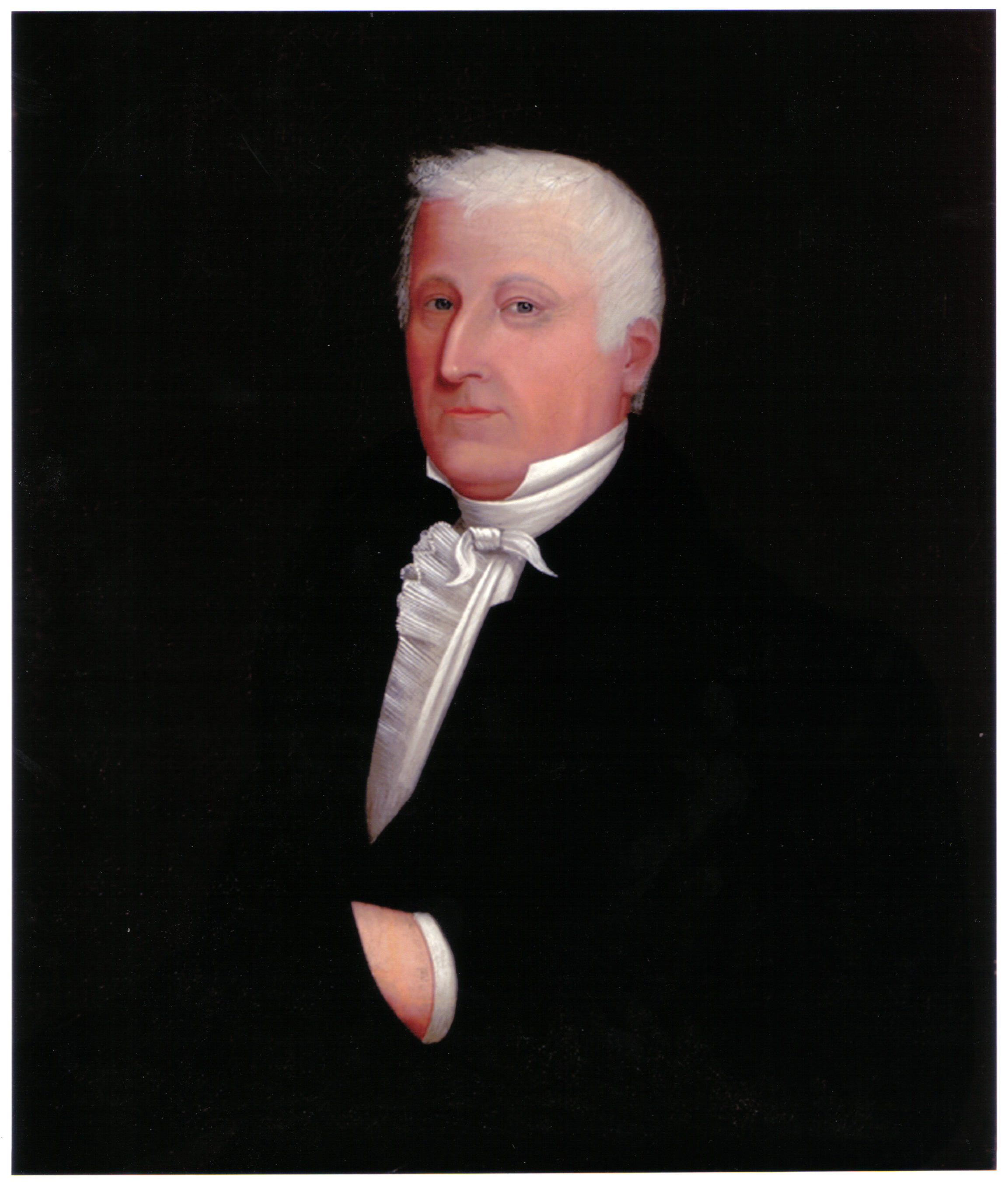
August-Franz Globensky, by Roy-Audy, c 1812–1815.

August Franz Globensky, born August Franciszek Głąbiński (or Glaubenskindt, Globenski, Glanbenkind; January 1, 1754 – April 19, 1830), was a Kingdom of Prussia born ethnic Polish medical doctor and one of the founding members of the Polish community in Canada. He was born near Berlin in the Kingdom of Prussia to Joseph Glaubenskindt, a royal notary originally from Poland, and Marie Richter, a German. The surname Glaubenskindt appeared on his baptismal certificate and on his army enrollment register. As Glaubenskindt is not normally used as a surname in Germany, it is likely Joseph acquired this sobriquet from a poetic Germanicization of Głowiński, a common Polish surname. He only used the name Globensky after his migration to Canada.

== Military service ==
August Franz served as a surgeon during the American Revolutionary War in the company of Major Hermann Albrecht von Francken, the Brunswick Corps of Friedrich Adolf Riedesel. His regiment landed in Quebec City on July 1, 1776. On October 7, 1777, Riedesel's regiment was defeated and surrendered at the Battle of Bemis Heights.

== Life in Canada ==
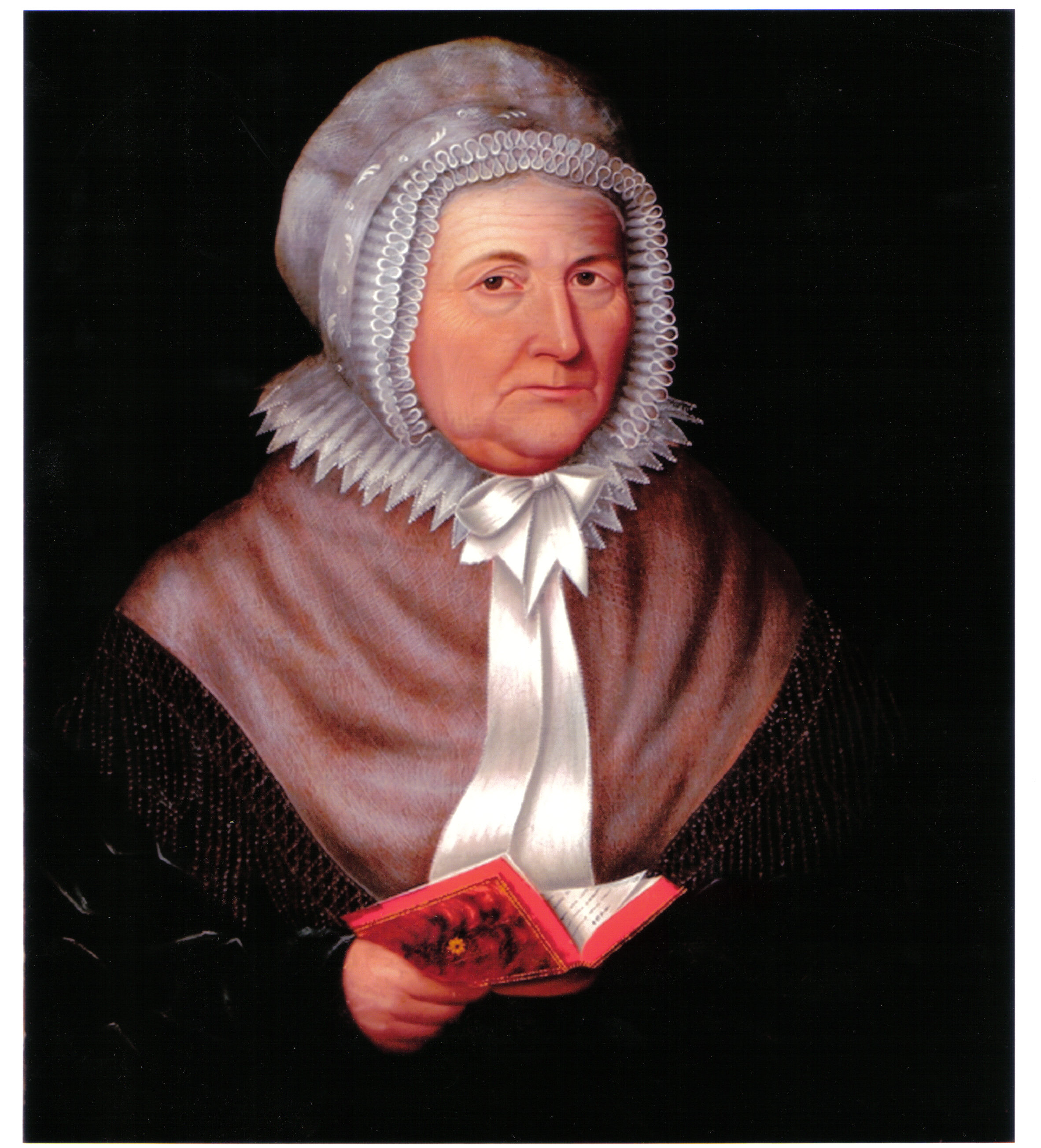
Marie-Françoise Globensky, by Roy-Audy, c 1812-1815

After the defeat at Bemis Heights, his company disbanded. Rather than return to Europe, he settled in Verchères, Quebec. He was one of the first Polish settlers in Canada. There, he married Françoise Brousseau and had sixteen children. The Church required him to present proof of Catholic baptism before his marriage could be solemnized, so he wrote to his father in Berlin for documentation. His baptismal certificate was forwarded, signed by his godfather, the sixth Prince Lobkowicz, Ferdinand Philip.

He operated a pharmacy between 1791 and 1830 that is considered the first Polish business in Canada.

His son, Lieutenant Colonel Maximilien Globensky fought in the War of 1812 and his grandson, Charles Auguste Maximilien Globensky, was elected from Two Mountains to the House of Commons of Canada in 1875.
