= Maximilien Globensky =

Canadian loyalist officer

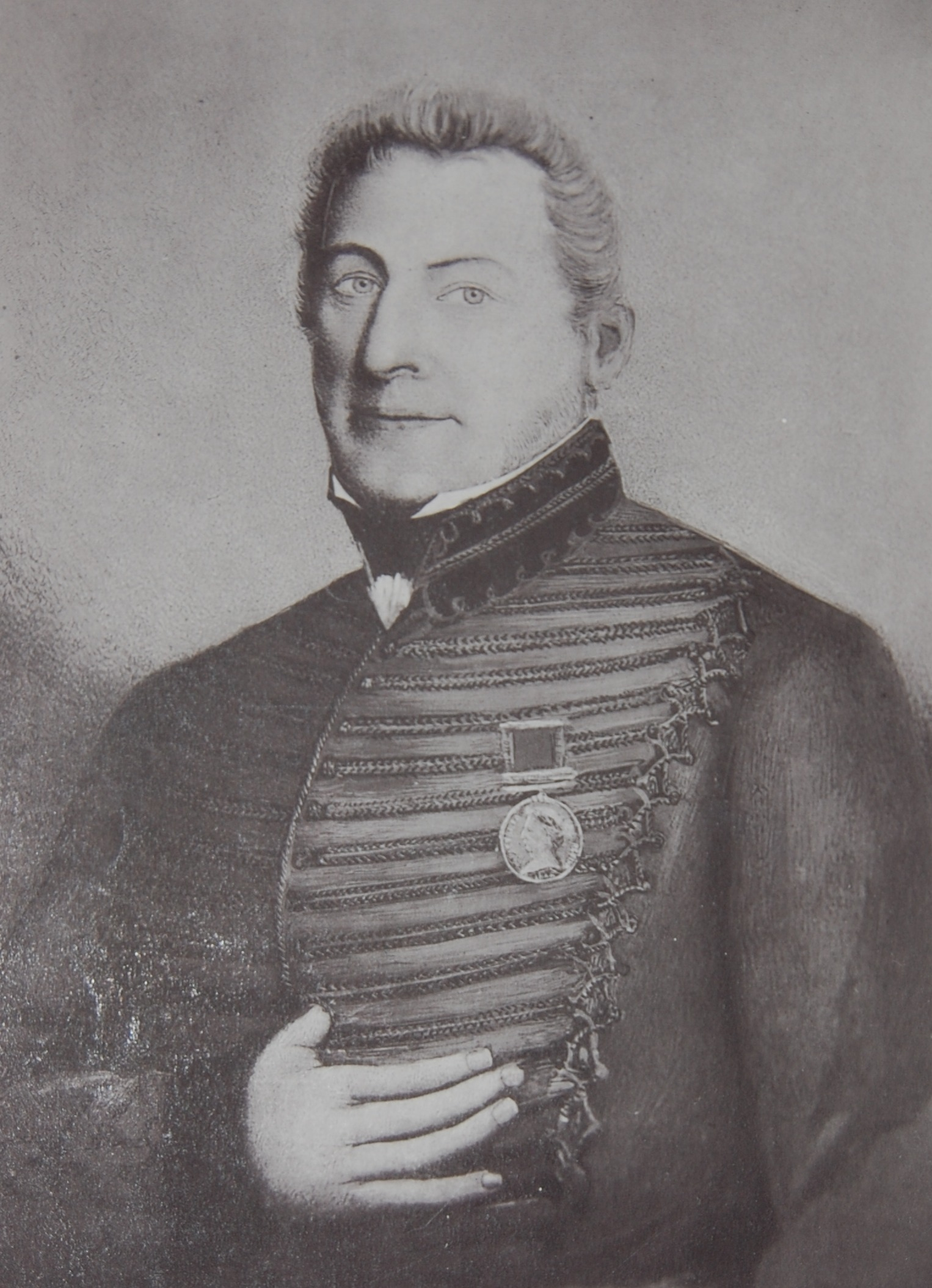
Lt. Maximilien Globensky, Canadian Voltigeurs, c. 1812. Portrait by J.-B. Roy-Audy

Lieutenant-Colonel Maximilien Globensky (15 April 1793 – 16 June 1866) was a French-Canadian who fought for the British in the War of 1812 and for the loyalists in the Rebellions of 1837.

Born in Verchères, Lower Canada, Maximilien was the seventh child of August Franz Globensky, a Prussian-born Polish surgeon who served with Hessian mercenaries and settled in Lower Canada after his detachment fought on the side of the British in the American War of Independence. His mother was Françoise Brousseau. He enlisted in the Canadian Voltigeurs during the War of 1812, and took part in the battles of Chateauguay, Lacolle, and Ormstown. After the war, he was promoted to 1st lieutenant and remained in the militia. When the rebellion broke out, Globensky was asked by his superiors to recruit 60 volunteers, and was then given command of the group.

On 14 December 1837, Globensky's company blocked the retreat of Patriote rebels fleeing from government troops in Saint-Eustache. The next day, he was ordered to occupy the town and maintain civil order. His men were later accused of committing criminal reprisals on the civilian population of Saint-Eustache, an account disputed in an 1883 book published by his son Charles Auguste Maximilien Globensky.

His loyalist sympathies were brought into focus years later, in 1875, when his son sought a seat in the House of Commons of Canada.

Globensky was married twice: first to Élisabeth Lemaire Saint-Germain and then to Marie-Anne Panet in 1851. He died in Saint-Eustache, Canada East at the age of 73.
