= Sainte-Scholastique, Quebec =

Coordinates: 45.6525°N 74.09277°W

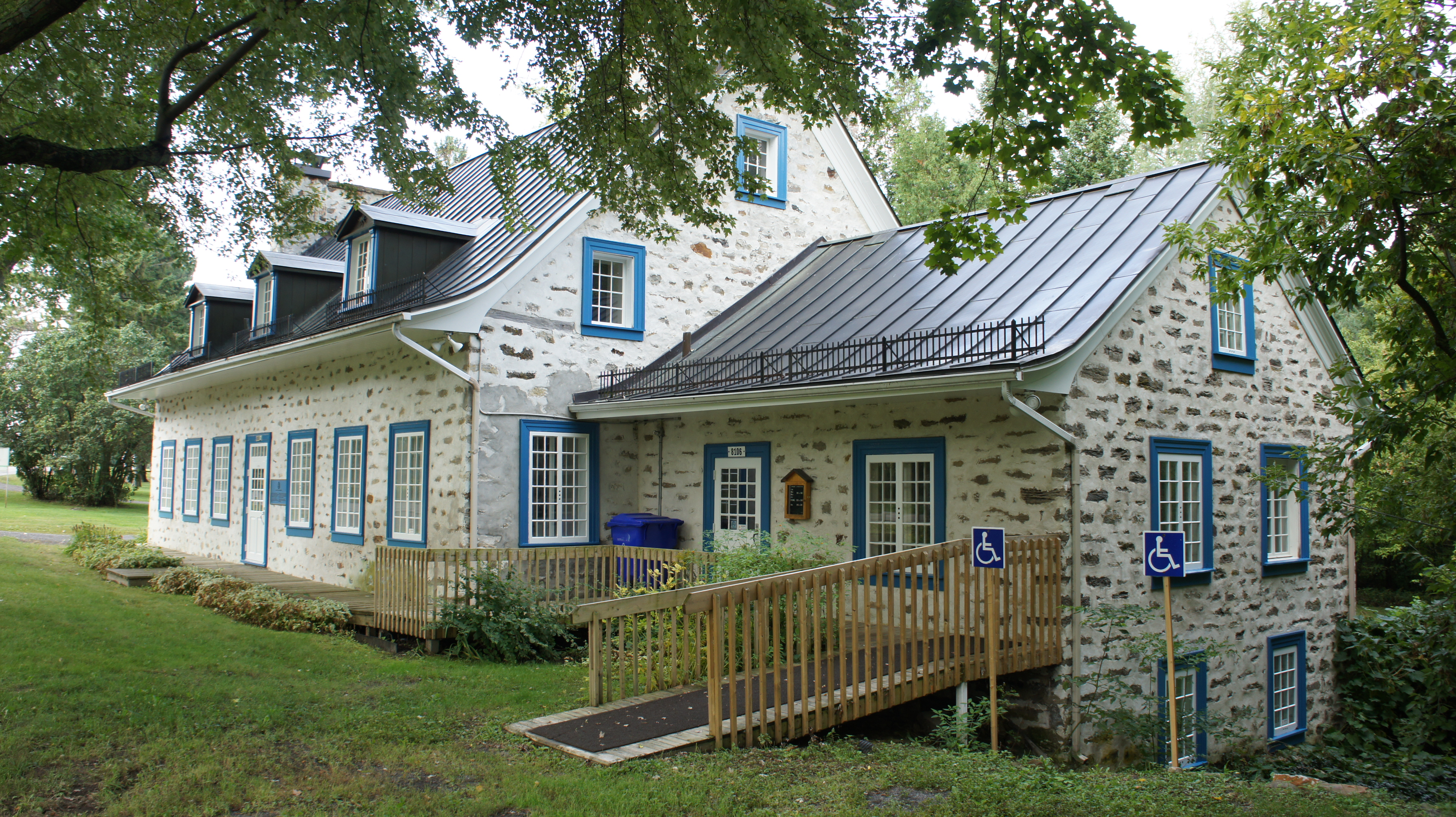
The Belle-Rivière Estate in Sainte-Scholastique, built in 1804

The village of Sainte-Scholastique, Quebec, Canada, was the historic seat of Deux-Montagnes County from 1834 until its amalgamation with neighbouring towns in 1971. Two years later, it was renamed to Mirabel. The village was named after Saint Scholastica, the sister of St. Benedict of Nursia (in French, Benoît), for whom the neighboring village of Saint-Benoît, Quebec was also named that same year.

Its location was 1 km (1000 yards) south of the apron of the modern Montréal-Mirabel International Airport's runway 10.
