= 1942 Progressive Conservative leadership convention =

Canadian election

1942 Progressive Conservative Party leadership election
- December 9 – 11, 1942
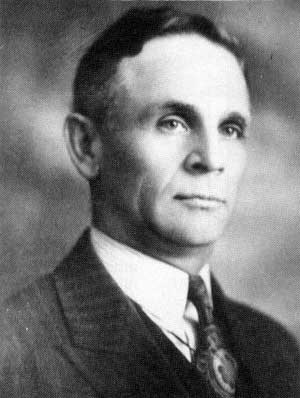

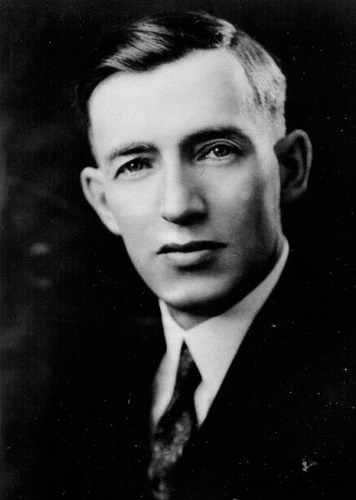

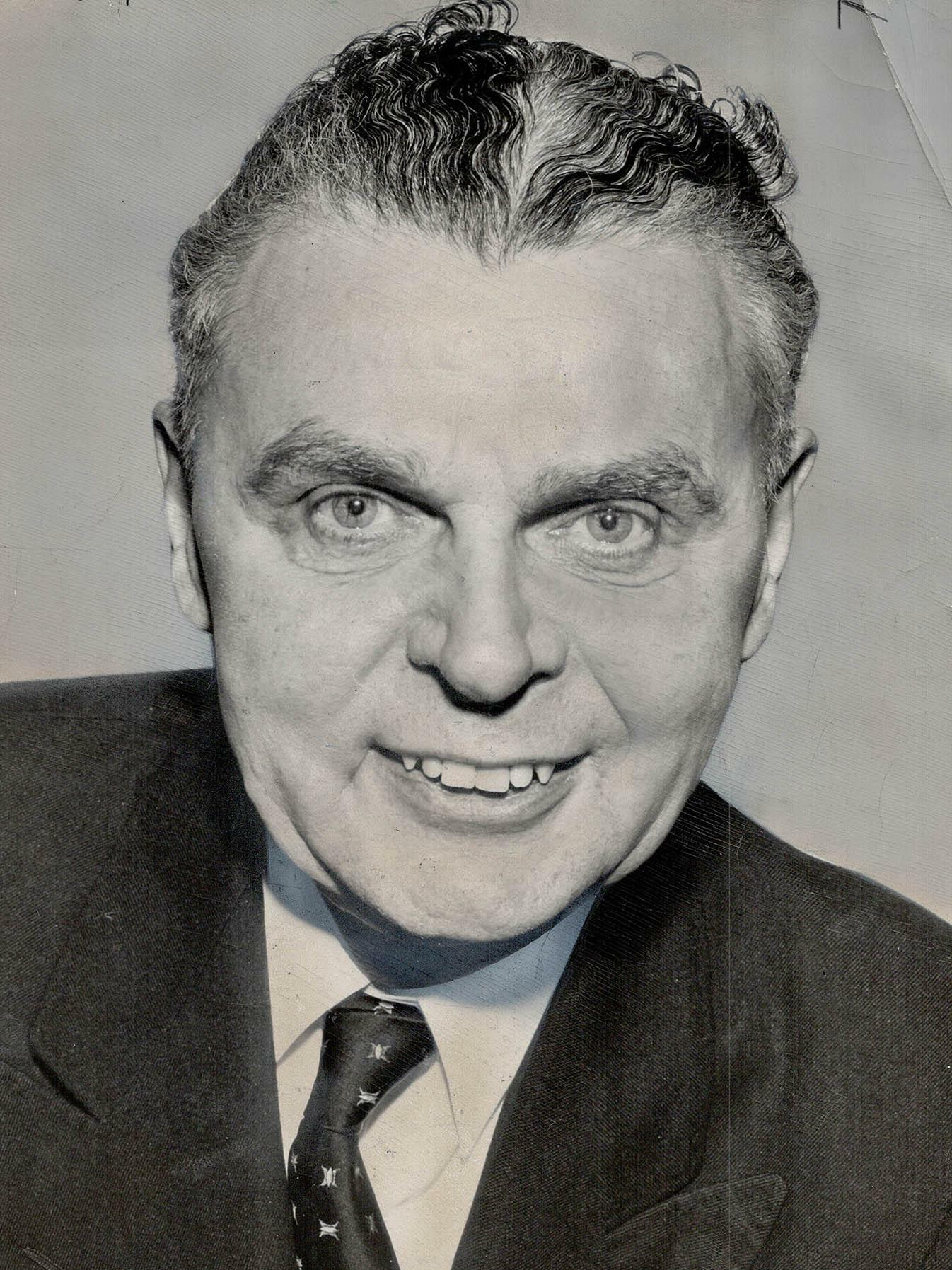
Candidate	John Bracken	Murdoch Alexander MacPherson	John Diefenbaker
Second ballot delegate count	538 (61.7%)	255 (29.2%)	79 (9.1%)
First ballot delegate count	420 (48.3%)	222 (25.5%)	120 (13.8%)
Leader before election
Arthur Meighen
Elected Leader
John Bracken

1942 Progressive Conservative leadership election
- Date: December 9 – 11, 1942
- Convention: Winnipeg Civic Auditorium, Winnipeg, Manitoba
- Resigning leader: Arthur Meighen
- Won by: John Bracken
- Ballots: 2
- Candidates: 5
- Spending limit: None

The 1942 Progressive Conservative Party leadership election was held to choose a leader to replace Arthur Meighen for the newly named Progressive Conservative Party of Canada.

== Background ==
Meighen had led the Conservative Party from 1920 to 1926 serving two short terms as Prime Minister of Canada. He was appointed to the Senate of Canada in 1932 by R. B. Bennett where he served as Leader of the Government in the Senate. Bennett's government suffered a landslide loss in the 1935 election, and he stepped down as party leader in 1938, with the ensuing leadership convention being won by Robert James Manion. Manion would lead the party to an even worse defeat in the 1940 election, and resigned as party leader after losing his own seat. Richard Hanson in turn became interim leader, but made it clear that he had no desire to permanently succeed Manion.

In 1941, the national conference of the Conservative Party voted unanimously in favour of Meighen becoming party leader without a leadership convention. Meighen resigned from the Senate and attempted to re-enter the House of Commons of Canada in a February 9, 1942 by-election in York South but was upset by the Co-operative Commonwealth Federation's Joseph Noseworthy. Without a seat in the Commons, Meighen's leadership was greatly weakened. In September 1942 he called for a national party convention to broaden out the party's appeal and reportedly approached populist John Bracken, the longtime Liberal-Progressive Premier of Manitoba to seek the party's leadership. On the first day of the convention, Meighen confirmed in his keynote address that he would not be a candidate for the party's leadership.

== Candidates ==
- John Bracken, 59, had been the Premier of Manitoba for 21 years, first as leader of the Progressive Party of Manitoba and then as leader of a coalition with the Liberal Party of Manitoba. He had been recruited by Meighen and other party leaders to run despite never having been a member of the Conservative Party.
- Murdoch MacPherson, 51, had been the Attorney-General of Saskatchewan from 1929 until 1932 and had contested the leadership of the national Conservative Party in 1938, coming in second.
- John Diefenbaker, 47, the Member of Parliament (MP) for Lake Centre, Saskatchewan since 1940.
- Howard Charles Green, 47, had been the Member of Parliament for Vancouver South, British Columbia since 1935.
- Henry Herbert Stevens, 64, had been a cabinet minister in the 1920s during the Meighen governments and had served as Minister of Trade and Commerce under R.B. Bennett. He resigned in 1934 to protest the government's fiscal policy and established the Reconstruction Party of Canada. That party received 400,000 votes in the 1935 election, but Stevens was the only one of its candidates elected as an MP. Stevens rejoined the Conservative Party in 1938 but lost his seat in the 1940 general election.

== Convention ==
The convention occurred several months after the September 1942 Port Hope Conference. 150 Conservative activists at that conference called on the party to adopt progressive policies in order to broaden its electoral appeal. Many of these policies were adopted by the December convention. Prior to the leadership vote, the party decided to change its name to the Progressive Conservative Party of Canada as an indication of the shift in policies. These included support for veteran employment social security, farming, health, natural resources, a national labour relations board, and resources for soldiers.

== Results ==
Bracken fell only marginally short of winning outright on the first ballot, with MacPherson a distant second, and the other three candidates earning largely insignificant numbers of votes; Stevens, who finished last, was eliminated, with Green also withdrawing and endorsing Bracken. The second round saw a few of Diefenbaker's delegates switch their support to MacPherson in an attempt to stop Bracken, but it proved too little, too late, as Green's endorsement of Bracken put the latter over the line, giving him enough votes for victory.

Delegate support by ballot
Candidate	1st ballot		2nd ballot	
Candidate	Votes cast	%	Votes cast	%
BRACKEN, John	420	48.3%	538	61.7%
MACPHERSON, Murdoch Alexander	222	25.5%	255	29.2%
DIEFENBAKER, John George	120	13.8%	79	9.1%
GREEN, Howard Charles	88	10.1%	Withdrew; endorsed Bracken	
STEVENS, Henry Herbert	20	2.3%	Eliminated; did not endorse	
Total	870	100.0%	872	100.0%
