= Port Hope =

Port Hope may refer to:

- Port Hope, Michigan, U.S.
- Port Hope, Ontario, Canada
  - Port Hope (Peter's Field) Aerodrome
  - Port Hope Conference
  - Port Hope Panthers
  - Port Hope railway station
  - Port Hope Transit
  - Trenton Golden Hawks, formerly the Port Hope Predators
- Port Hope Simpson, Newfoundland and Labrador, Canada
  - Port Hope Simpson Airport
- Port Hope Township, Beltrami County, Minnesota, U.S.
