= Port Hope Conference =

The Port Hope Conference was a meeting of the Conservative Party of Canada at Port Hope, Canada in 1942 to develop a new party platform.

== History ==
The Conservative Party's popular support had been waning (particularly in western Canada) during difficult economic times from the 1920s to 1940s, as it was seen by many in the west as an eastern establishment party which ignored the needs of the citizens of Western Canada. Westerners of multiple political convictions including small-"c" conservatives saw the party as being largely uninterested in the economically unstable Prairie regions of the west at the time and instead holding close ties with the business elite of Ontario and Quebec. This resulted in R.B. Bennett's government suffering a landslide defeat in the 1935 election, and then an even worse result under the leadership of Robert Manion in 1940. The party was thus left without a coherent power base, not being able to compete with the ruling Liberal Party in the east, or the newly-formed Co-operative Commonwealth Federation and Social Credit Party in the west.

== The charter ==
After party leader Arthur Meighen failed to win a seat in the 1942 York South byelection, a group of younger Conservatives decide to meet in Port Hope to develop a new Conservative policy they hoped would bring them out of the political "wilderness". The participants, known as the Port Hopefuls, developed a program including many Conservative dogmas such as support for free enterprise and conscription. Yet the charter also included more "radical" goals, such as full-employment, low-cost housing, trade union rights, as well as a whole range of social security measures, including a government financed medicare system.

== Reaction and influence ==
Although many Conservatives rejected the charter, the charter still influenced party decisions. Delegates at the December 1942 party convention drafted Liberal-Progressive Manitoba Premier John Bracken, who was not even a member of the party, to be the new leader. Bracken supported the Port Hope Charter and insisted the party register this policy shift by changing its name to the Progressive Conservative Party of Canada.
