= 1927 Conservative leadership convention =

1927 Conservative Party leadership election
- October 12, 1927
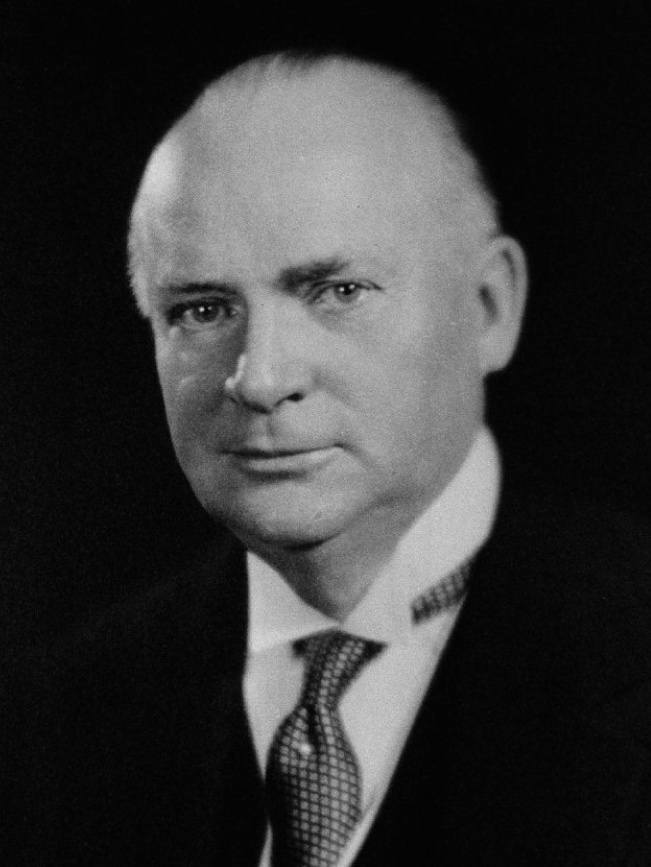

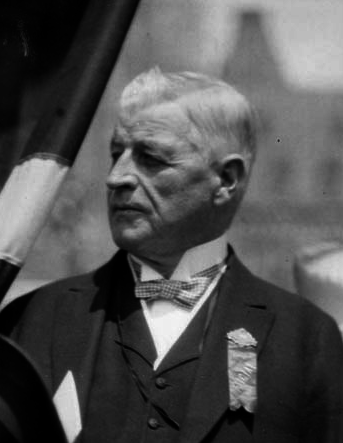

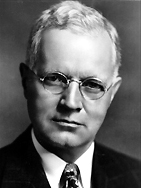

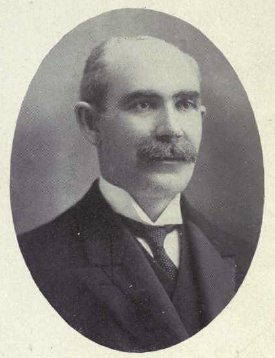

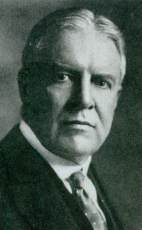
			CON
Candidate	R. B. Bennett	Hugh Guthrie	Charles Hazlitt Cahan
Second ballot delegate count	780 (50.2%)	320 (20.6%)	266 (17.1%)
First ballot delegate count	594 (38.0%)	345 (22.0%)	310 (19.8%)
Candidate	Robert James Manion	Robert Rogers	Henry Lumley Drayton
Second ballot delegate count	148 (9.5%)	37 (2.4%)	3 (0.2%)
First ballot delegate count	170 (10.9%)	114 (7.3%)	31 (2.0%)
Leader before election
Hugh Guthrie (interim)
Elected Leader
R. B. Bennett

1927 Conservative leadership election
- Date: October 12, 1927
- Convention: Winnipeg Amphitheatre, Winnipeg, Manitoba
- Resigning leader: Arthur Meighen
- Won by: R. B. Bennett
- Ballots: 2
- Candidates: 6

A Conservative leadership convention was held on October 12, 1927 at the Winnipeg Amphitheatre in Winnipeg, Manitoba. The convention was held to choose a new leader of the Conservative Party (formally the Liberal-Conservative Party) to choose a successor to former Prime Minister of Canada Arthur Meighen who had led the party since 1920. This was the first time the Conservatives used a leadership convention to choose a leader. Previous leaders had been chosen by the party's caucus, the previous leader, or by the Governor General of Canada designating an individual to form a government after his predecessor's death or resignation.

== Background ==
Meighen had succeeded Sir Robert Borden as prime minister and leader of the Unionists, a coalition of Conservatives and pro-conscription Liberal-Unionists in 1920 and attempted to forge the alliance into a permanent party called the National Liberal and Conservative Party. Despite his efforts, most Liberal supporters of the Borden government either returned to the Liberal Party of Canada or joined the new Progressive Party of Canada after World War I and Meighen's party was defeated in the 1921 federal election by the Liberals under their new leader William Lyon Mackenzie King. At a March 1922 caucus meeting that re-affirmed Meighen's leadership, the party voted to change its name to the Liberal-Conservative Party which it was known by under Sir John A. Macdonald.

Meighen's Conservatives won a plurality of seats in the 1925 federal election but King's Liberals were able to continue in power until 1926 with the support of the Progressives, until King's government lost a non-confidence vote in the House of Commons of Canada. King asked Governor General Lord Byng for a dissolution and new election but Byng asked Meighen to form a government instead, a controversial decision that became known as the King-Byng Affair. Meighen's government, in turn, was defeated in a non-confidence vote after three months and the subsequent September 14, 1926 federal election returned the Liberals to power and also resulted in Meighen losing his seat in the House.

Meighen resigned as party leader, and MP Hugh Guthrie (Wellington South) was elected as interim leader of the Conservative Party on October 11, 1926 at a special meeting of its parliamentary caucus, as well as Conservative candidates who had been defeated in the election.

In addition to Guthrie, MPs Henry Herbert Stevens, Sir George Halsey Perley (Argenteuil), Robert Manion (Fort William), Charles Cahan (St. Lawrence—St. George), Sir Henry Drayton (York West), Charles William Bell (Hamilton West) and Simon Fraser Tolmie (Victoria) were also nominated for the interim leadership. Guthrie defeated Manion and Stevens on the third ballot to become interim leader and Leader of the Official Opposition until a permanent leader was chosen. The caucus also recommended that a leadership convention, the party's first, be held in 1927 to choose a permanent leader.

== Candidates ==
- Richard Bedford Bennett, 57, Member of Parliament for Calgary West, Alberta served as Minister of Finance in Meighen's 1926 government and had been the first leader of the Alberta Conservative party.
- Hugh Guthrie, 61, MP for Wellington South, Ontario, was a former Liberal who became a Liberal-Unionist supporter of Borden's World War I government in which he served as Solicitor General of Canada. He continued in cabinet under Meighen as Minister of Militia and Defence (1920-1921) and then as Minister of Justice and Minister of National Defence in Meighen's 1926 government. He led the party in parliament as Leader of the Opposition since 1926 due to Meighen losing his seat.
- Charles Cahan, 66, MP for St. Lawrence—St. George, Quebec was first elected to parliament in 1925. He had led the Nova Scotia Conservative Party in the 1890s and served as Director of Public Safety for Canada during the war. He was a hardline Conservative advocating free enterprise and individualism.
- Robert Manion, 46, Member of Parliament for Fort William, Ontario, had served in parliament since 1917 and had been a Liberal before the war but joined the Unionists as a result of the Conscription Crisis of 1917. He served as Minister of Soldiers' Civil Re-establishment in Meighen's first government and, variously, as Minister of Immigration and Colonization (acting), Minister of Labour (acting), Minister of Soldiers' Civil Re-establishment (acting), Minister presiding over the Department of Health (acting), and Postmaster General (acting) in his second.
- Robert Rogers, 63, had been the MP for Winnipeg South until losing his seat in the 1926 election. He had been Minister of Public Works in the Manitoba government before entering federal politics in 1911 and was appointed to Borden's cabinet as Minister of the Interior and Superintendent-General of Indian Affairs and then as Minister of Public Works from 1912 to 1917. He did not stand in the 1917 federal election, returned to parliament in 1925, but lost his seat in 1926.
- Sir Henry Drayton, 58, was Member of Parliament for York West, Ontario and served as Minister of Finance under both Borden and Meighen.

== Convention ==
Heading into the convention, Ontario premier Howard Ferguson was considered the favourite as he enjoyed popularity in Quebec as well as Ontario as his government had repealed Regulation 17 which had restricted French-language school instruction. Other Conservatives wanted Meighen to stand as a candidate and succeed himself. Meighen and Ferguson clashed on the convention floor after Meighen, who had attempted to make overtures to Quebec where the Conservatives and Meighen were unpopular due to the Conscription crisis of 1917, proposed that Canada not be able to go to war in future without there first being a referendum or federal election on the issue. Meighen raised the issue on the floor of the convention but Ferguson, echoing the views of many English-Canadian Conservatives, loudly denounced Meighen's position saying: "I, as a Liberal-Conservative, entirely disagree with him and repudiate that view; and if this convention chooses to endorse him, I will dissociate myself entirely from the convention." Ferguson's comments were received with a round of boos taking him out of consideration for leadership while also making Meighen succeeding himself untenable.

George Halsey Perley, H. H. Stevens, John Allister Currie, New Brunswick premier John Baxter, Ferguson, Nova Scotia premier Edgar Nelson Rhodes, and outgoing leader Arthur Meighen were all nominated but declined to run.

Bennett had the support of Ferguson and Stevens, who worked the convention floor on his behalf. Bennett spoke no French in his speech to delegates. Guthrie misspoke by saying: "Ladies and gentlemen, I welcome this, the greatest Liberal convention in all history," and hurt his prospects in Quebec by saying he wished to "obliterate" distinctions between French and English.

Resolutions were passed favouring preferential tariffs throughout the British Empire but not if it hurt farmers or workers, social legislation to support the unemployed, ill, and elderly "so far as it is practicable" and an immigration policy that supported settlers from Britain and excluded "such races... as are not capable of ready assimilation." The party also committed itself to maintaining the Canadian National Railway as a "publicly owned and operated utility" and affirmed the "traditional adherence of the Liberal-Conservative Party to the principle of loyalty to the Crown, and the maintenance of that integral connection of Canada with the British Empire". The convention also approved the construction of a St. Lawrence canal as an all-Canadian project, maintenance of a maximum freight rate for grain products, construction of interprovincial highways, implementation of the findings of the Duncan Commission investigating grievances of the Maritime provinces, as well as resolutions on the development of mining, the fisheries, and agriculture, and for legislation giving the Western provinces powers over natural resources within their territory.

== Results ==
While there had been some expectation of a close race between Bennett and Guthrie, the latter's bungled speech at the convention proved severely injurious to his chances, and resulted in Bennett having a commanding lead in the first ballot. Guthrie finished second, narrowly ahead of Cahan, followed by Manion, Rogers and then Drayton. Guthrie and Cahan actually had more votes between them then Bennett did, but any hope of one dropping out and endorsing the other was ultimately thwarted by their political views being too dissimilar, plus the enmity that Guthrie's speech had generated among the delegates from Quebec, who by and in large supported Cahan. In addition, either Guthrie or Cahan would realistically have needed Manion's delegates in order to defeat Bennett, and Manion was not prepared to support either of them.

No-one dropped out or endorsed any other candidate prior to the second round - unlike future leadership contests, the bottom-placed candidate was not automatically eliminated in each round - but Bennett attracted roughly equal numbers of delegates from all five of his rivals, and secured victory in the second round.

Delegate support by ballot
Candidate	1st ballot		2nd ballot	
Candidate	Votes cast	%	Votes cast	%
BENNETT, Richard Bedford	594	38.0%	780	50.2%
GUTHRIE, Hugh	345	22.0%	320	20.6%
CAHAN, Charles Hazlitt	310	19.8%	266	17.1%
MANION, Robert James	170	10.9%	148	9.5%
ROGERS, Robert	114	7.3%	37	2.4%
DRAYTON, Henry Lumley	31	2.0%	3	0.2%
Total	1,564	100.0%	1,554	100.0%
