= Bennett buggy =

Horse-drawn vehicle

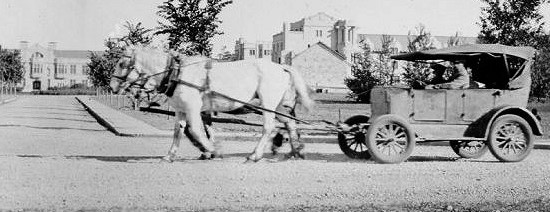
Bennett Buggy (University of Saskatchewan)

A Bennett buggy was a term used in Canada during the Great Depression to describe a car which had its engine, windows and sometimes frame work taken out and was pulled by a horse. In the United States, such vehicles were known as Hoover carts or Hoover wagons, named after then-President Herbert Hoover.

The Canadian term was named after Richard Bennett, the Prime Minister of Canada from 1930 to 1935, who was blamed for the nation's poverty.

Cars being pulled by horses became a common sight during the Depression. During the boom years of the 1920s, many Canadians had bought cheap vehicles for the first time, but during the depression, many found they did not have enough money to operate them. This was especially true in the hard-hit Prairie Provinces. The increased poverty played an important role, as farmers could not buy gasoline. The price of gas also increased. Gas taxes were also one of the best sources of revenue for the provincial governments. When these provinces went into a deficit, they increased these taxes, making gas even harder to buy.

In Saskatchewan, badly hit by the depression, similar vehicles with an additional seat over the front axle were dubbed "Anderson carts" after Premier James T. M. Anderson.
