= 1930 Canadian federal election =

- July 28, 1930

245 seats in the House of Commons 123 seats needed for a majority
- Turnout: 73.5% (▲5.8 pp)
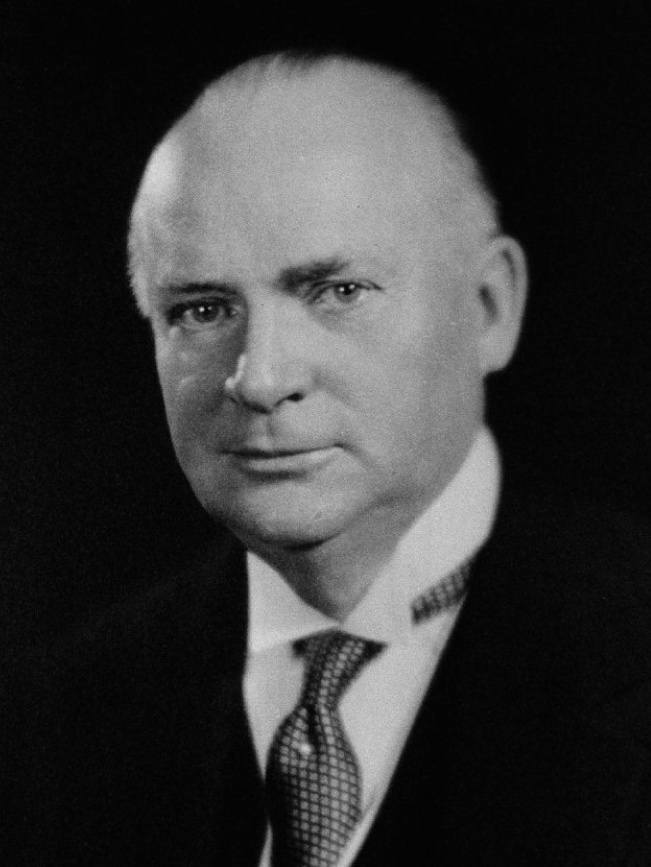

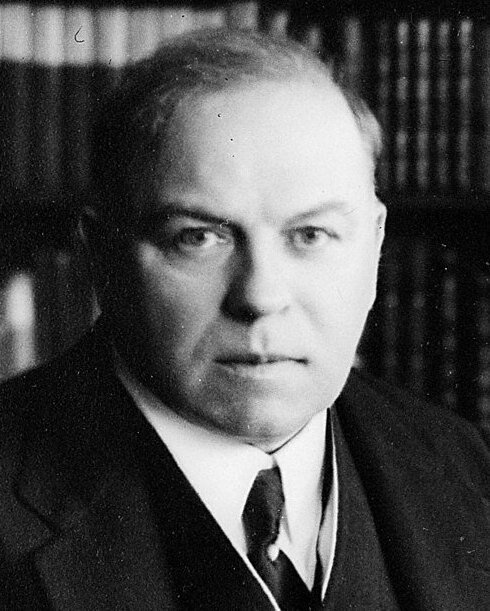

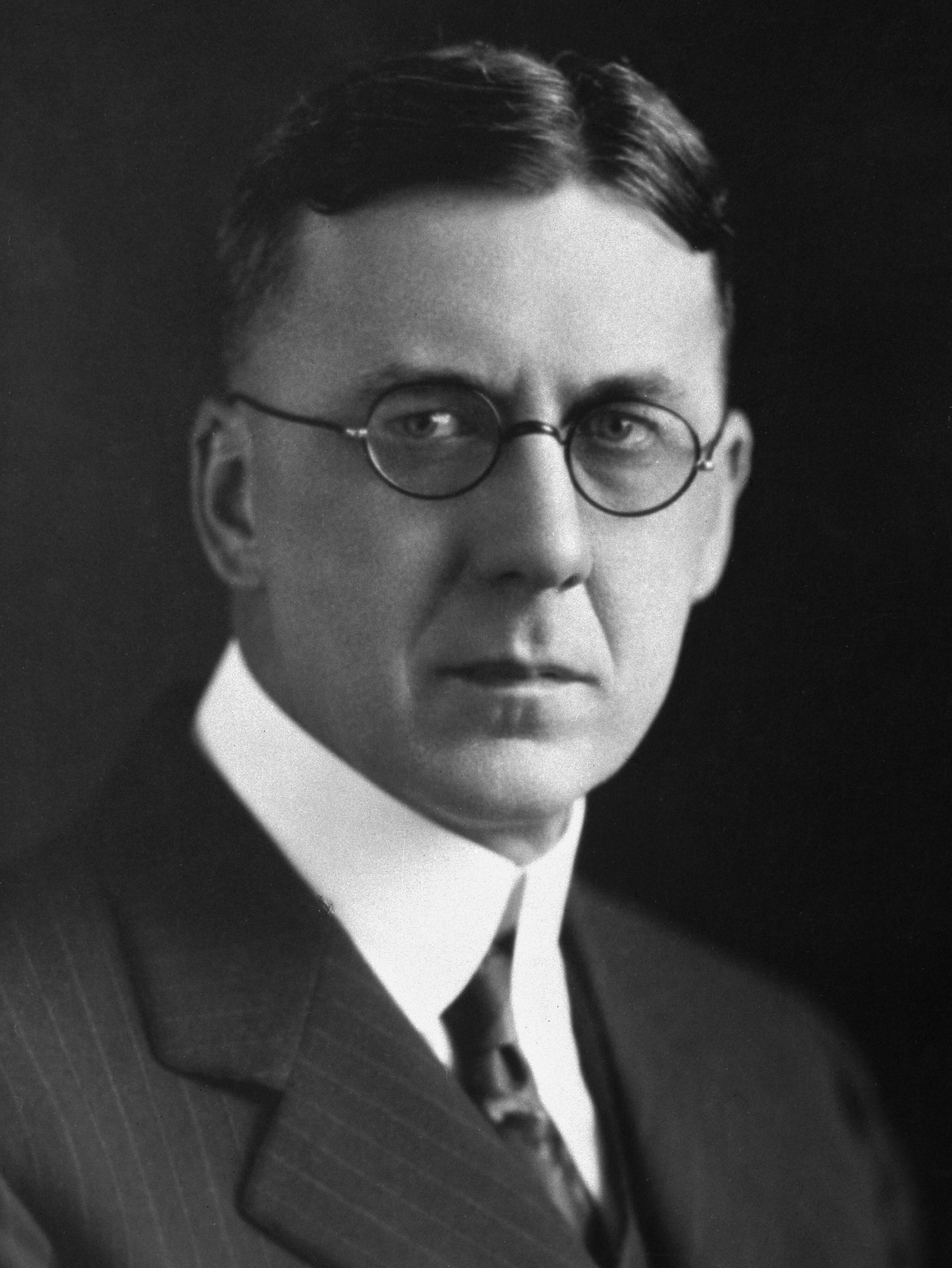
	First party	Second party
Leader	R. B. Bennett	W. L. Mackenzie King
Party	Conservative	Liberal
Leader since	October 12, 1927	August 7, 1919
Leader's seat	Calgary West	Prince Albert
Last election	91 seats, 45.35%	116 seats, 42.90%
Seats won	137	89
Seat change	▲46	▼27
Popular vote	1,863,115	1,716,798
Percentage	47.79%	44.03%
Swing	▲3.08 pp	▲1.13 pp
	Third party	Fourth party
Leader	John E. Brownlee	None
Party	United Farmers of Alberta	Progressive
Leader since	November 23, 1925	N/A
Leader's seat	Did not run	None
Last election	11 seats, 1.87%	11 seats, 3.93%
Seats won	9	3
Seat change	▼2	▼8
Popular vote	56,968	70,822
Percentage	1.46%	1.82%
Swing	▼0.55 pp	▼2.41 pp

- The Canadian parliament after the 1930 election
Prime Minister before election
William Lyon Mackenzie King
Liberal
Prime Minister after election
R. B. Bennett
Conservative

The 1930 Canadian federal election was held on July 28, 1930, to elect members of the House of Commons of the 17th Parliament of Canada. Richard Bedford Bennett's Conservative Party won a majority government, defeating the Liberal Party led by Prime Minister William Lyon Mackenzie King. 3,922,481 votes were cast in this election.

== Background ==
The first signs of the Great Depression were clearly evident by the 1930 election, and Conservative party leader Richard Bennett campaigned on a platform of aggressive measures in order to combat it.

"I propose that any government of which I am the head will at the first session of parliament initiate whatever action is necessary to that end, or perish in the attempt."

— Richard Bennett, June 9, 1930

Part of the reason for Bennett's success lay in the Liberals' own handling of the rising unemployment of 1930. Touting the Liberal formula as the reason for the economic prosperity of the 1920s, for example, left the Liberals carrying much of the responsibility, whether deserved or not, for the consequences of the crash of the American stock market.

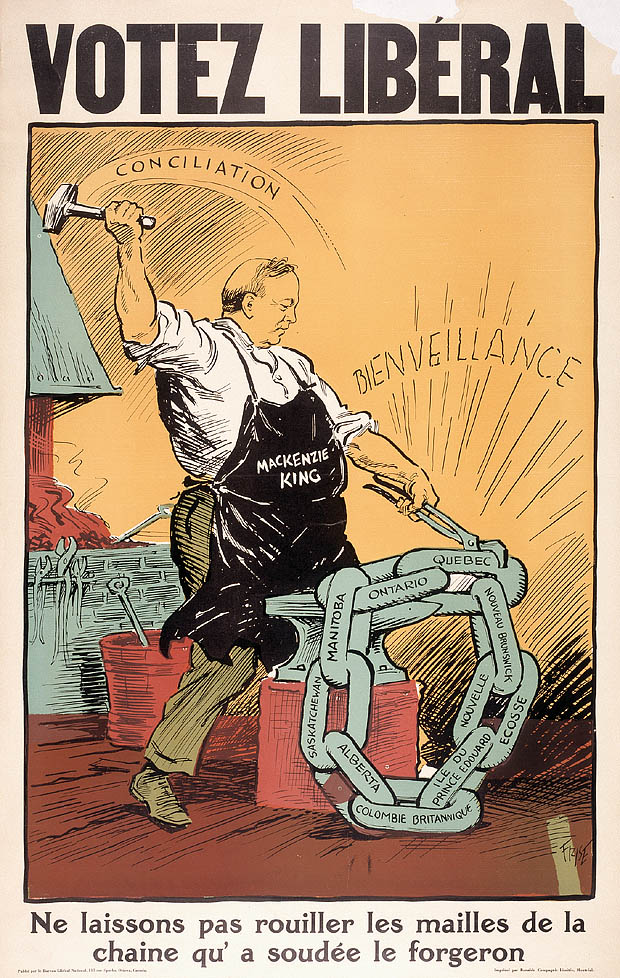
Liberal election poster in French, showing King forging a chain link.

King was apparently oblivious to the rising unemployment that greeted the 1930s, and continued to laud his government's hand in Canada's prosperity. Demands for aid were met with accusations of being the part of a great "Tory conspiracy", which led King to make his famous five-cent piece outburst, alienating a growing number of voters. In retrospect, one can understand King's reasoning. Both the Western mayors and provincial Premiers who had visited King with requests of relief were overwhelmingly Conservative: in the Premiers' case, seven out of nine. King concluded in Parliamentary debates that though aid was a provincial jurisdiction, the fact that he believed there to be no unemployment problem meant that the requests from the provinces appeared to be nothing more than political grandstanding. The Federal Conservatives had certainly exaggerated the Depression in its early stages solely to attack King's government.

Several other factors entered into King's defeat. Although obtaining funds from sometimes dubious sources was not a problem, the Liberal election machine was not as efficient as it once was, primarily due to the cause of the age and poor health of many chief strategists. King's campaign was the epitome of Murphy's law: every campaign stop appeared to meet the Prime Minister with some kind of mishap.

By contrast, Bennett's Conservatives were electric. The self-made man who led them had practically rebuilt his party (a significant part of it with his own funds) and developed an election machine which could rival the Liberals'. Aside from superior party organization, the Tories used it. They bought out newspapers in key areas (notably the Liberal strongholds of the West, and Quebec) and ensured that pro-Tory slants were kept. In the first election where radio played an important role, Bennett's vibrant, zealous voice was extremely preferable to King's. The Tory machine ensured that only the best radio spots were available to Bennett.

Also, Bennett's tariff policy, epitomized by his infamous promise to "blast" Canada's way into world markets, was extremely well received in the key Liberal strongholds of the West and Quebec. In the West, agricultural production had been hurt by worldwide overproduction, and certain agricultural groups in Quebec firmly endorsed Bennett's tariff policy. Bennett's Conservatives won much of the former Progressive and Farmers' vote in the West, and they were elected with 44% of the popular vote in Quebec as a protest vote. All those factors led to Bennett's eventual election.

Canadian voters agreed with Bennett and the Conservatives were elected with a majority of 137 seats in the House of Commons. The incumbent Liberals under William Lyon Mackenzie King became the official opposition after being reduced to 89. The Progressives continued their decline, winning only three seats. The United Farmers of Alberta did somewhat better, despite finishing third place in the popular vote in that province they managed to hold on to nine of its seventeen seats, of which the UFA only contested ten.

This would mark the final federal election until 2025 where the Liberals and Conservatives, or any top-two parties, both won over 40% of the popular vote. This would also be the last election the Progressives or the UFA would win any seats. The effects of the Great Depression, which were felt under Bennett and peaked in 1933, brought extreme hardship for most Canadians, leading to a Conservative loss in the 1935 election to the Liberals under the previous Prime Minister William Lyon Mackenzie King, and the Conservatives would not return to government until 1957, then rebranded as the Progressive Conservatives.

== National results ==

Party	Party leader	# of candidates	Seats			Popular vote		
Party	Party leader	# of candidates	1926	Elected	% Change	#	%	pp Change
Conservative	R. B. Bennett	229	91	137	+69.6%	1,863,115	47.79%	+3.07
Liberal	W. L. Mackenzie King	226	116	88	-21.1%	1,716,798	44.03%	+1.29
United Farmers of Alberta		10	11	9	-18.2%	56,968	1.46%	-0.55
Progressive		15	11	3	-72.7%	70,822	1.82%	-2.41
Liberal–Progressive		8	8	3	-62.5%	44,822	1.15%	-0.94
Labour	J.S. Woodsworth	8	4	2	-50.0%	26,548	0.68%	-0.95
Independent		11	2	2	-	21,608	0.55%	-0.30
Progressive-Conservative		2	-	1		15,996	0.41%	+0.1
Independent Labour		2	*	1	*	15,988	0.41%	*
Independent Liberal		8	1	-	-100%	14,426	0.37%	-0.25
Farmer		5	*	-	*	11,999	0.31%	*
Independent Conservative		6	-	-	-	10,360	0.27%	-0.07
Unknown		2	-	-	-	7,441	0.19%	+0.08
Liberal-Labour		1	-	-	-	7,195	0.18%	+0.05
Communist	Tim Buck	6	*	-	*	4,557	0.12%	*
Labour-Farmer		2	-	-	-	3,276	0.08%	+0.04
Liberal-Protectionist		1	*	-	*	2,723	0.07%	*
Farmer-Labour		1	*	-	*	2,091	0.05%	*
Independent Progressive		1	*	-	*	1,294	0.03%	*
Franc Lib		1	*	-	*	429	0.01%	*
Prohibitionist		1	*	-	*	266	0.01%	*
Total		546	245	245	-	3,898,722	100%	
Sources: http://www.elections.ca -- https://web.archive.org/web/20090609211221/http://www2.parl.gc.ca/Sites/LOP/HFER/hfer.asp?Language=E History of Federal Ridings since 1867 https://www.ourcommons.ca/marleaumontpetit/DocumentViewer.aspx?DocId=1001&Language=E&Sec=Ch25&Seq=11

Note:

* The party did not nominate candidates in the previous election.

== Vote and seat summaries ==
Ternary plots - shift of electoral support (1926-1930)
1926

1930
Electoral districts identified by colours of winning parties

Popular vote
Conservative	47.79%
Liberal	44.03%
Progressive	1.82%
United Farmers	1.46%
Others	4.90%

Seat totals
Conservative	55.10%
Liberal	36.33%
United Farmers	3.67%
Progressive	1.22%
Others	3.67%

== Results by province ==
Party name		BC	AB	SK	MB	ON	QC	NB	NS	PE	YK	Total
Conservative	Seats:	7	4	7	10	59	24	10	10	3	1	135
Conservative	Popular vote (%):	49.3%	35.0%	33.6%	44.1%	53.9%	43.7%	59.3%	52.5%	50.0%	60.3%	47.8%
Liberal	Seats:	5	3	12	1	22	40	1	4	1	-	89
Liberal	Vote:	40.9%	30.0%	48.4%	19.6%	42.4%	53.2%	40.7%	47.5%	50.0%	39.7%	44.0%
UF Alberta	Seats:		9									9
UF Alberta	Vote:		28.4%									1.5%
Progressive	Seats:		-	2	-	1						3
Progressive	Vote:		1.9%	8.1%	6.4%	1.8%						1.8%
Liberal-Progressive	Seats:			-	3							3
Liberal-Progressive	Vote:			2.1%	16.2%							1.2%
Labour	Seats:		-		2	-						2
Labour	Vote:		3.0		8.4	0.1						0.7
Independent	Seats:	1		-		-	1					2
Independent	Vote:	2.6		3.5		0.1	0.3					0.6
Progressive-Conservative	Seats:				1		-					1
Progressive-Conservative	Vote:				2.7		1.0					0.4
Independent Labour	Seats:	1			-							1
Independent Labour	Vote:	6.5			0.1							0.4
Total Seats		14	16	21	17	82	65	11	14	4	1	245
Parties that won no seats:
Independent Liberal	Vote:				0.4		1.3					0.4
Farmer	Vote:			3.6								0.3
Independent Conservative	Vote:				1.2	0.5	0.1					
Unknown	Vote:					0.5						0.2
Liberal-Labour	Vote:					0.5						0.2
Communist	Vote:	0.4			0.9	0.1						0.1
Labour-Farmer	Vote :		0.6									0.1
Liberal-Protectionist	Vote:						0.3					0.1
Farmer-Labour	Vote:			0.6								0.1
Independent Progressive	Vote:						0.1					xx
Franc Lib	Vote:	0.2										xx
Prohibitionist	Vote:	0.1										xx

- xx - less than 0.05% of the popular vote

== See also ==
- 17th Canadian Parliament
- List of Canadian federal general elections
- List of political parties in Canada
