= 1938 National Conservative leadership convention =

1938 Conservative Party leadership election
- July 7, 1938
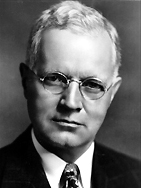

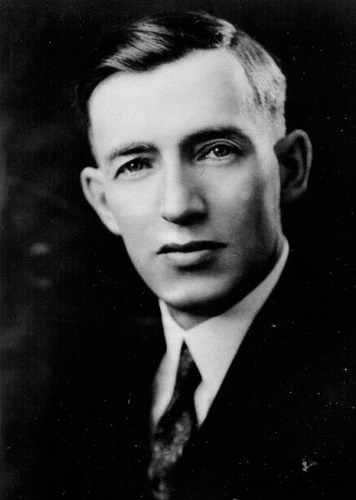
| Candidate | Robert James Manion | Murdoch Alexander MacPherson |
| Second ballot delegate count | 830 (53.0%) | 648 (41.4%) |
| First ballot delegate count | 726 (46.4%) | 475 (30.3%) |
Leader before election
R.B. Bennett
Elected Leader
Robert James Manion

1938 Conservative leadership election
- Date: July 7, 1938
- Convention: Ottawa Coliseum, Lansdowne Park; Ottawa, Ontario
- Resigning leader: R.B. Bennett
- Won by: Robert James Manion
- Ballots: 2
- Candidates: 5
- Entrance fee: C$

A National Conservative leadership convention began on July 5, 1938, culminating in a leadership ballot on July 7. The Conservative Party of Canada chose Robert James Manion to succeed former Prime Minister R. B. Bennett as party leader.

== Background ==
The Bennett Conservatives were defeated in the 1935 federal election after a single term during the Great Depression. The Conservatives won only 40 seats, in part, because the party split after Trade Minister Henry Herbert Stevens left the Conservatives to form the Reconstruction Party of Canada. Stevens' party received almost 400,000 votes in the election leading to the defeat of numerous Conservative MPs. After continuing for three years as Leader of the Opposition, an ailing Bennett announced in March 1938 his intention to resign as leader and a leadership convention was called for later that year.

== Candidates ==
- Robert James Manion, 56, had been the Member of Parliament for Fort William from 1917 until losing his seat in 1935. Originally a Liberal, he entered parliament as a Liberal-Unionist supporter of Robert Borden's wartime Union government. Manion had served as Minister of Soldiers' Civil Re-establishment in 1921 and Postmaster-General in 1926 during Arthur Meighen's short premierships, and as Minister of Railways and Canals under Bennett. A Catholic, he was backed by an "improbable coalition" of Orange Order delegates from Ontario and delegates from Quebec and was on the left of the party, advocating government assistance to end unemployment among other measures. He had placed fourth at the 1927 leadership convention.
- Murdoch MacPherson, 47, had been the Attorney-General of Saskatchewan from 1929 until 1932 and was appointed by Bennett to help create the Farm Credit Corporation.
- Joseph Henry Harris, 49, had been a Toronto-area Member of Parliament since 1921
- Denton Massey, 35, had been Member of Parliament for the Toronto riding of Greenwood since 1935 and was a member of the prominent Massey family.
- Earl Lawson, 43, had been MP for York West and then York South since 1928 and served as Bennett's Minister of National Revenue. He represented the old guard of the party.

== Convention ==
Despite his resignation a "Draft Bennett" movement emerged at the convention due to the perceived weakness of the existing candidates, aimed at convincing Bennett to change his mind. Ontario Premier Howard Ferguson and Bennett's brother-in-law, former Canadian envoy to the United States William Duncan Herridge approached former leader Arthur Meighen in hopes of eliciting his support for Bennett's continued leadership but he declined to support the move as he had already endorsed MacPherson for leader and thought a last-minute Bennett candidacy would be unfair to MacPherson and Manion. Bennett was non-committal on the draft but indicated he was willing to continue as leader and attempted to persuade leadership candidates to withdraw in his favour, but Manion refused and, an hour before voting began, Bennett indicated that he would not be a candidate. Herridge introduced a motion endorsing Bennett's economic interventionist approach as opposed to the more traditional laissez-faire policies being endorsed by the convention which he denounced as "a lot of junk" but Herridge was roundly booed and his motion failed to find a seconder. Herridge would go on to leave the party and found the New Democracy party that stood in the 1940 federal election. The party voted to change its name from the Liberal-Conservative Party to the National Conservative Party of Canada. Resolutions passed favouring defence “consultation and cooperation” within the British Empire, opposing amalgamating the Canadian Pacific and Canadian National railways, for the completion of the Trans-Canada Highway, for immigration focused on UK, Ireland and France with restrictions for “Orientals”, maintaining tariffs for industry and agriculture, and plans for national unemployment and retirement insurance.

An attempt to draft former Prime Minister Arthur Meighen was also unsuccessful and another rumoured candidate, Henry Herbert Stevens, a former cabinet minister who had broken with Bennett to found the Reconstruction Party of Canada also declined to run. Meighen gave a keynote address on defence policy calling on Canadian-British solidarity which undermined Manion's candidacy, as he was perceived to be conciliatory to Quebec, and caused an uproar among Quebec delegates some of whom threatened to quit the party.

Manion was the heavy favourite heading into the convention but was almost upset by MacPherson, who was largely unknown outside of Saskatchewan until he gave a speech that rallied the convention and caused him to emerge as a dark horse contender.

== Results ==
Manion came close to winning on the first ballot, but was denied by an unexpectedly strong showing by MacPherson, who finished a solid second, albeit sixteen percentage points behind Manion. Lawson was eliminated after finishing bottom of the first ballot, and endorsed MacPherson in an attempt to head off Manion. MacPherson's campaign could not persuade either Harris or Massey to drop out and support him, however, and both insisted on remaining on the ballot for the next round.

The second round saw MacPherson increase his vote by eleven percentage points, thanks to his managing to attract the support of most of Lawson's delegates, plus a good chunk of Massey's. However, Manion was able to attract enough delegates (mostly from Harris's camp) to secure victory on the second ballot.

Delegate support by ballot
| Candidate | 1st ballot | | 2nd ballot | |
| Candidate | Votes cast | % | Votes cast | % |
|---|---|---|---|---|
| MANION, Robert James | 726 | 46.4% | 830 | 53.0% |
| MACPHERSON, Murdoch Alexander | 475 | 30.3% | 648 | 41.4% |
| HARRIS, Joseph Henry | 131 | 8.4% | 49 | 3.1% |
| MASSEY, Denton | 128 | 8.2% | 39 | 2.5% |
| LAWSON, James Earl | 105 | 6.7% | Eliminated | |
| Total | 1,565 | 100.0% | 1,566 | 100.0% |
