= Roy Piovesana =

Canadian teacher and historian (1942–2020)

Prof: Roy Piovesana and Pres. Tony Buttazoni: Alpini Choir

Roy Piovesana (born 1942 in Fort William (Thunder Bay), Ontario; died Jan. 20, 2020), was a Canadian teacher and historian. He is one of three children born to Enrico Piovesana (1900–1987) and Christina Brescia (1913–1990). His father emigrated from Pasiano Pordenone (near Udine) in 1924 and his mother was a second-generation Italian Canadian born in Fort William.

Roy Piovesana grew up in Fort William's East End attending St. Peter's Roman Catholic School, an institution that was truly multicultural. He also attended Fort William Collegiate Institute graduating in 1961.

In 1965, Piovesana graduated from Lakehead University with an Honours Bachelor of Arts (History). Five years later he received his M.A. (History) from Lakehead University. In 1965, he began his teaching career at Westgate Collegiate Institute and then moved to Hammarskjold High School as a teacher and head of history in 1984. Piovesana was a Sessional Lecturer at the Faculty of Education, Lakehead University in 1992 and 1993. He retired from teaching in June 1998.

In 2000, he was appointed archivist/historian for the Roman Catholic Diocese of Thunder Bay by The Most Rev. Frederick J. Colli, Bishop of Thunder Bay.

He was a president of the Thunder Bay Historical Museum Society and the Thunder Bay Art Gallery and served as a trustee with the Canadian Museum of Nature from 1996 to 2007.

In addition, Piovesana has become a well-known historian with numerous publications to his credit including R. J. Manion: Member of Parliament for Fort William, 1917-1935 (1990), and Hope and Charity: An Illustrated History of the Roman Catholic Diocese of Thunder Bay (2002). He co-authored Paper and People: An Illustrated History of Great Lakes Paper and Its Successors, 1919-1999 with Beth Boegh, and St. Dominic Parish: A History, 1912-1987 with his wife Diane.

In 1999, he was awarded a Citizen of Exceptional Achievement Award (Culture) by the city of Thunder Bay, Ontario. In 2003, he was made an Honorary Life Member of The Thunder Bay Historical Society. That same year, he was a finalist for the prize for arts and heritage: Chronicle-Journal City of Thunder Bay.
