= Hopewell Hill, New Brunswick =

Coordinates: 45°45′50.5″N 64°41′0.6″W

Hopewell Hill is a Canadian rural community in Albert County, New Brunswick.

It is most famous for being the birthplace of the Right Honourable Richard Bedford Bennett, 1st Viscount Bennett, PC, KC, LL.B (July 3, 1870 – June 26, 1947), who was the eleventh Prime Minister of Canada from August 7, 1930 to October 23, 1935. Hopewell Hill has a population of almost 200, and has a store, an auto garage, a teahouse and a restaurant.

== History ==
- Cyrus Wesley Peck - Hopewell Hill born recipient of the Victoria Cross for actions at Cagnicourt, France during the First World War

== Notable people ==
- R. B. Bennett

== See also ==
- List of communities in New Brunswick
