= M. A. MacPherson =

Canadian politician and Attorney General of Saskatchewan

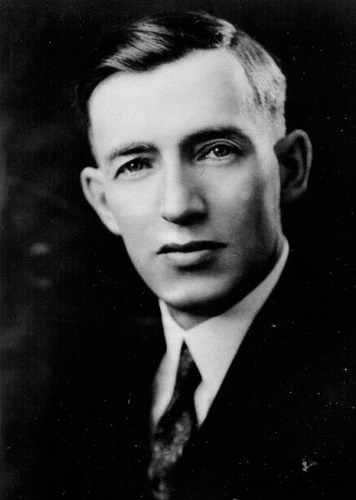
M. A. MacPherson.

Murdoch Alexander MacPherson, QC (April 16, 1891 – June 12, 1966) was a Canadian politician, Attorney-General of Saskatchewan under Conservative Premier James T.M. Anderson from 1929 to 1932.

== Early life and education ==
Born at MacPherson House on Cape Breton Island, MacPherson attended law school at Dalhousie University in Halifax.

== Military and legal career ==
He served in World War I and commanded a company of the 10th Battalion at Battle of Vimy Ridge where he came out unscathed. He was wounded by shellfire, however, at Arleux, near Arras a few days later. MacPherson Avenue in Regina, Saskatchewan was later named in his honour, and is an official memorial of the Canadian Department of National Defence. After the war he practiced law in Saskatchewan and eventually became a Queen's Counsel (Q.C.).

== Political career ==
MacPherson was first elected to the Saskatchewan legislative assembly in 1924, and remained a member of the Legislative Assembly until his defeat in the 1934 provincial election that wiped out the Conservative Party. He was called to Ottawa late in the term of the R.B. Bennett government to assist in creating the Farm Credit Corporation. In 1959, he headed a Royal Commission: the MacPherson Commission.

In 1938 and again in 1942, he was a candidate at the federal Conservative leadership conventions, coming in second place on both occasions.

== Personal life ==
In May 1961, he received an honorary Doctor of Civil Law degree from the University of Saskatchewan.

One of his three sons, Murdoch Alexander MacPherson Jr., known as "Sandy", born in 1916, was a pillar of the local Progressive Conservative Party and of the non-concurring First Presbyterian congregation. He served as a justice of the Saskatchewan Court of Queen's Bench from 1961 to 1981; during this time, he sat on the custody case of Colin Thatcher.

M.A.'s second son, Ian, served in the Indian Army during the Second World War and after being promoted to the rank of acting Lieutenant-Colonel, was killed in action near Mawlu in Burma in April 1944. He is memorialized in Michael Calvert's book "Prisoners of Hope."

Another son, Donald K. MacPherson (always referred to and addressed as "D.K. MacPherson"), was a successful Saskatchewan labour lawyer and later Chief Justice of the Saskatchewan Court of Queen's Bench. D.K.'s son, Les MacPherson, is a retired columnist for the Saskatoon Star-Phoenix newspaper.
