= Robert James Manion =

Canadian politician (1881–1943)

The Honourable Robert James Manion PC MC
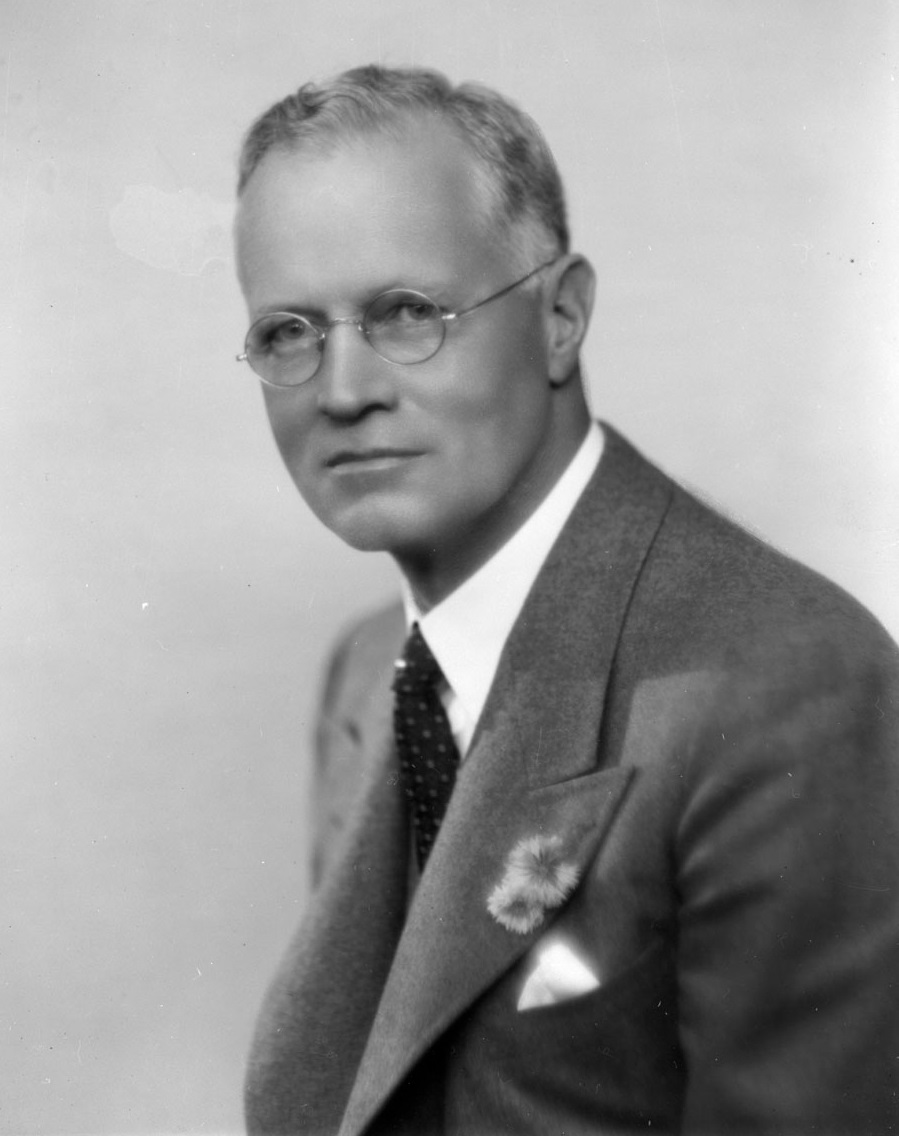
- Manion in 1938

Leader of the Opposition
- In office November 14, 1938 – March 25, 1940
- Preceded by: R. B. Bennett
- Succeeded by: Richard Hanson

Leader of the Conservative Party
- In office July 7, 1938 – May 13, 1940
- Preceded by: R. B. Bennett
- Succeeded by: Richard Hanson (acting)

Member of Parliament for London
- In office November 14, 1938 – March 25, 1940
- Preceded by: Frederick Cronyn Betts
- Succeeded by: Allan Johnston

Member of Parliament for Fort William (Fort William and Rainy River; 1917–1925)
- In office December 17, 1917 – October 13, 1935
- Preceded by: Riding created
- Succeeded by: Dan McIvor

Personal details
- Born: 19 November 1881 Pembroke, Ontario, Canada
- Died: 2 July 1943 (aged 61) Ottawa, Ontario, Canada
- Party: Conservative
- Other political affiliations: Unionist (1917-1921)
- Spouse: Yvonne Desaulniers (m. 1906)
- Children: 3
- Education: Queen's University, Kingston; Ontario and at the University of Edinburgh
- Occupation: Physician

Military service
- Allegiance: Canada
- Branch/service: Canadian Army
- Years of service: 1916-1918
- Rank: Captain
- Battles/wars: World War I

Robert James Manion PC MC (19 November 1881 – 2 July 1943) was a Canadian politician who led the Conservative Party of Canada from 1938 to 1940. Prior to his leadership of the party, he served in Prime Minister Arthur Meighen and R. B. Bennett's cabinets.

A Liberal prior to World War I, Manion was elected to the House of Commons in 1917 as a member of the pro-conscription Unionist Party led by Prime Minister Robert Borden. After the war, he served as a Conservative Member of Parliament until his defeat in 1935. In 1938, Manion was elected leader of the Conservatives, which was shortly relabeled as National Government. Despite his pro-conscription stance in World War I, Manion campaigned against conscription in World War II in the 1940 federal election. Manion also ran on a platform of forming a wartime coalition national unity government. In the election, the National Government lost in a landslide, keeping their seat count exactly the same as in the 1935 federal election. Manion also lost his seat of London, and subsequently resigned as leader. Shortly after, Manion was appointed director of Civilian Air Raid Defence. He died in 1943 in Ottawa.

== Early life ==
Manion was born in Pembroke, Ontario, of Irish Catholic descent, the son of Mary Ann (O'Brien) and Patrick James Manion. He studied medicine at Queen's University, Kingston, Ontario, and at the University of Edinburgh before settling in his hometown of Fort William, Ontario, where his parents had lived since 1888.

In 1915, he enrolled in the Canadian Army Medical Corps. Attached to the 21st Canadian Battalion, he was awarded the Military Cross for heroism at the battle of Vimy Ridge.

== Political career ==
Manion was elected to the House of Commons during the conscription election of 1917 as a Unionist Member of Parliament (MP) for Fort William, Ontario. A member of the Liberal Party before the war, he supported Conservative Prime Minister Robert Borden's pro-conscription Union government that was formed as a result of the Conscription Crisis of 1917. Manion remained with the Conservative Party after the war. The new prime minister, Arthur Meighen, appointed him Minister of Soldiers' Civil Re-establishment in 1921. He spent most of the 1920s on the opposition benches, except for a few months in 1926 when he served as a minister in the second Meighen administration, including the position of Postmaster-General.

Following the federal election of 1930, the new Conservative Prime minister R. B. Bennett appointed Manion Minister of Railways and Canals. However, the economic crisis of the Great Depression destroyed the Bennett government, and Manion, with many others, lost his seat in the 1935 election. According to historian Roy Piovesana, Manion's loss was partly attributable to his failure to cultivate his Fort William riding.

=== Conservative Party leader ===
Despite not having a seat, Manion won the Conservative leadership convention with backing of an "improbable coalition" of Orange Order delegates from Ontario and delegates from Quebec. Conservative Party members hoped that his Catholicism and marriage to a French-Canadian, Yvonne Desaulniers, would help the party in Quebec where the perception of the Tories as being anti-French and anti-Catholic Orangemen had hurt their prospects. Manion entered the House of Commons through a by-election in 1938 in London.

Following his by-election win, Manion subsequently campaigned against conscription despite the fact that he had joined the Unionists in 1917 because he favoured the draft. Manion moved the Conservatives to the left and was criticized as a socialist due to his call for action against unemployment and his desire to, in his words, "bring a greater measure of social justice to all our citizens."

He hoped to come to power due to the criticism the King government was facing after the brokerage of an agreement with the Union Nationale Premier of Quebec, Maurice Duplessis in which he promised federal funds for unemployment relief in Quebec in exchange for the Union Nationale's support for the Conservatives in the federal election. The onset of World War II and the re-emergence of conscription as an issue in Canada stymied Manion's hopes. In the 1939 Quebec election the federal Liberals warned that the Duplessis government's support for Manion would lead to conscription, despite Manion's claims that he opposed mandatory military enlistment. The defeat of the government of Maurice Duplessis in Quebec dashed Manion's hopes of building an electoral alliance with the conservative premier. As well, his stand against conscription turned much of the Tory base in Ontario against the leader.

==== 1940 federal election ====
King had promised Manion that he would not call an election due to the war but reversed his pledge and called a March 1940 general election taking Manion's Tories by surprise and unprepared. They campaigned under the name "National Government" with the platform of forming a wartime coalition government. King and his Liberal Party were quite popular, especially after his government helped Canada recover from the depression. Therefore, the Liberals won a second consecutive landslide majority government, the renamed Tories were unable to make any gains from their 1935 result, and Manion failed to win his seat, leading to his resignation as party leader two months later.

== Later life ==
After his election loss, Manion was appointed director of Civilian Air Raid Defence. He died in 1943 in Ottawa.

== See also ==
- Conscription Crisis of 1944
- Liberal-Unionist

== Archives ==
There is a Robert James Manion fonds at Library and Archives Canada.

== Bibliography ==
- Manion, Robert James. A surgeon in arms. Toronto: McClelland, Goodchild & Stewart, 1918.
- Manion, R.J. Life is an adventure. Toronto : Ryerson Press, 1936.
- Naugler, Harold Adelbert. R.J. Manion and the Conservative Party 1938-1940. M.A. thesis 1966, Queen's University, Kingston, Ont.
- Piovesana, Roy H. Robert J. Manion member of Parliament for Fort William 1917-1935. Thunder Bay : Thunder Bay Historical Museum Society, 1990.
