= R. B. Bennett =

Prime Minister of Canada from 1930 to 1935

The Right Honourable The Viscount Bennett PC (Can) PC KC FRSA
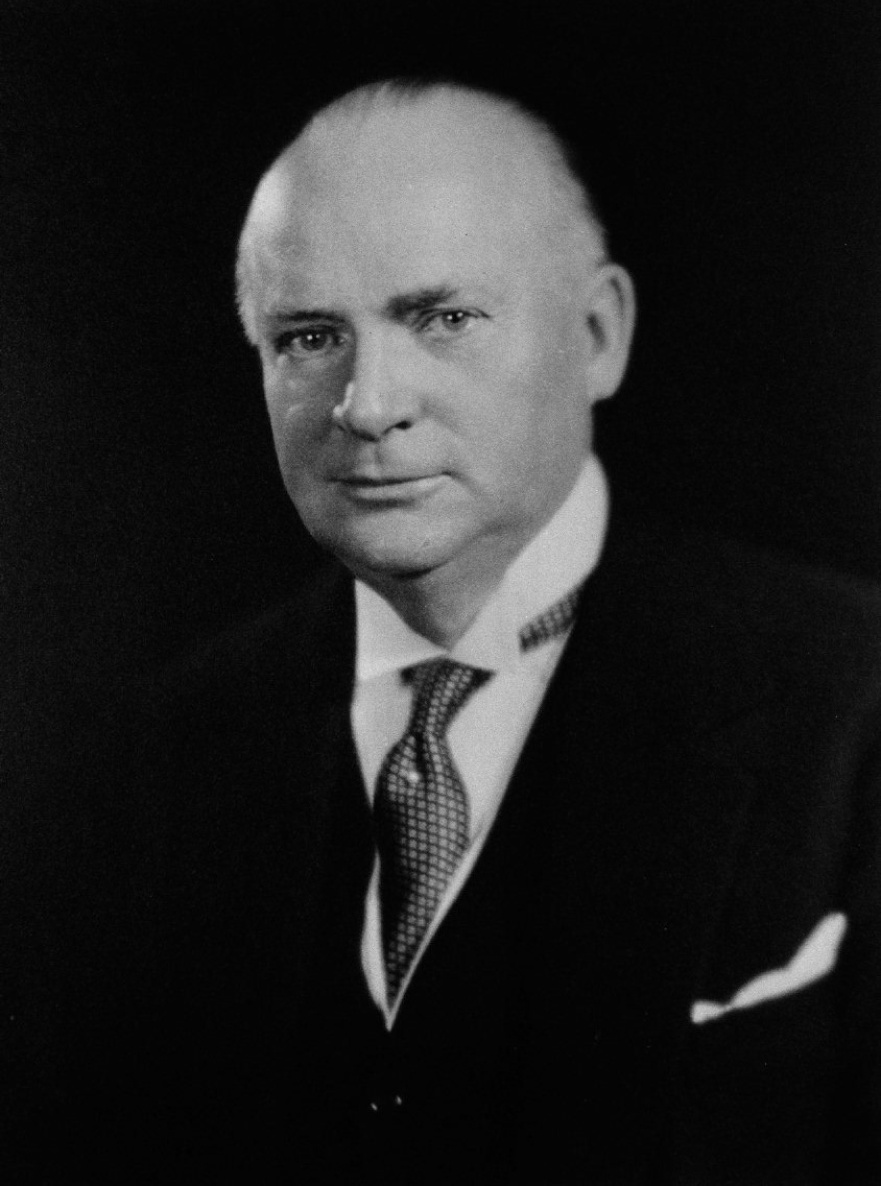
- Bennett c. 1930–1935

11th Prime Minister of Canada
- In office August 7, 1930 – October 23, 1935
- Monarch: George V
- Governors General: The Viscount Willingdon; The Earl of Bessborough
- Preceded by: W. L. Mackenzie King
- Succeeded by: W. L. Mackenzie King
Cabinet positions
Minister of Finance
In office August 7, 1930 – February 2, 1932
Prime Minister	Himself
Preceded by	Charles Avery Dunning
Succeeded by	Edgar Nelson Rhodes
In office July 13 – September 25, 1926
Prime Minister	Arthur Meighen
Preceded by	Henry Lumley Drayton (acting)
Succeeded by	James Robb
Minister of Justice
In office October 4 – December 28, 1921
Prime Minister	Arthur Meighen
Preceded by	Charles Doherty
Succeeded by	Lomer Gouin
Political leadership positions
Leader of the Opposition
In office October 23, 1935 – July 6, 1938
Preceded by	W.L. Mackenzie King
Succeeded by	Robert Manion
In office October 12, 1927 – August 7, 1930
Preceded by	Hugh Guthrie
Succeeded by	W.L. Mackenzie King
Leader of the Conservative Party
In office October 12, 1927 – July 7, 1938
Preceded by	Hugh Guthrie (interim)
Succeeded by	Robert Manion
Leader of the Alberta Conservative Party
In office 1909–1910
Preceded by	Albert Robertson
Succeeded by	Edward Michener
In office 1905–1905
Preceded by	Position established
Succeeded by	Albert Robertson
Parliamentary constituencies
Member of the House of Lords Lord Temporal
In office June 12, 1941 – June 26, 1947; Hereditary Peerage
Preceded by	Peerage established
Succeeded by	None
Member of Parliament for Calgary West
In office October 29, 1925 – January 28, 1939
Preceded by	Joseph Tweed Shaw
Succeeded by	Douglas Cunnington
Member of Parliament for Calgary
In office September 21, 1911 – December 16, 1917
Preceded by	Maitland Stewart McCarthy
Succeeded by	District abolished
Member of the Legislative Assembly of Alberta for Calgary
In office March 22, 1909 – 1911
Succeeded by	Thomas Tweedie
Member of the Legislative Assembly of the Northwest Territories for West Calgary
In office November 4, 1898 – 1905
Preceded by	Oswald Critchley
Succeeded by	District abolished

Personal details
- Born: Richard Bedford Bennett; July 3, 1870 Hopewell Hill, New Brunswick, Canada
- Died: June 26, 1947 (aged 76) Mickleham, Surrey, England
- Resting place: St. Michael's Churchyard, Mickleham
- Citizenship: British subject
- Party: Conservative
- Education: Dalhousie University (LLB)
- Profession: Lawyer
- R. B. Bennett's voice Bennett giving his farewell speech to Britain following the 1930 Imperial Conference

Richard Bedford Bennett, 1st Viscount Bennett (July 3, 1870 – June 26, 1947) was a Canadian lawyer, businessman, philanthropist, and politician who served as the 11th prime minister of Canada from 1930 to 1935.

Bennett was born in Hopewell Hill, New Brunswick, and grew up nearby in Hopewell Cape. He studied law at Dalhousie University, graduating in 1893, and in 1897 moved to Calgary to establish a law firm in partnership with James Lougheed. Bennett became very rich due to the law practice, various investments, and taking on leadership roles in multiple organizations; he was one of the wealthiest Canadians during his time. On the political side, Bennett served in the Legislative Assembly of the Northwest Territories from 1898 until 1905, when he briefly held the post as the inaugural leader of the Alberta Conservative Party. He later served in the Alberta Legislature from 1909 to 1911, resigning upon his election to the House of Commons. Bennett declined to run for reelection in 1917 but briefly served as minister of justice under Arthur Meighen in 1921. He returned to the Commons in 1925 and served briefly as minister of finance in Meighen's second government in 1926. Meighen resigned the Conservative Party's leadership after his defeat in the 1926 election, with Bennett elected as his replacement in 1927. Thus, Bennett became leader of the Opposition.

Bennett became prime minister after the 1930 election, where the Conservatives won a majority government over William Lyon Mackenzie King's Liberal Party. Bennett's premiership was marked primarily by the Great Depression. He and his party initially tried to combat the crisis with laissez-faire policies, but these were largely ineffective. He was also unsuccessful in establishing an imperial preference free trade agreement. Over time, Bennett's government became increasingly interventionist, attempting to replicate the popular "New Deal" enacted by Franklin Roosevelt in the United States. This about-face prompted a split within Conservative ranks and was regarded by the general public as evidence of incompetence. Still, he left lasting legacies in the form of the Canadian Radio Broadcasting Commission (CRBC) and the Bank of Canada.

Bennett suffered a landslide defeat in the 1935 election, with King returning to power. Bennett remained leader of the Conservative Party until 1938 when he retired to England. He was created Viscount Bennett, the only Canadian prime minister to be honoured with elevation to the peerage. Bennett is ranked as a below-average prime minister among historians.

== Early life (1870–1890) ==
Bennett was born on July 3, 1870, when his mother, Henrietta Stiles, was visiting her parents' home in Hopewell Hill, New Brunswick, Canada. He was the eldest of six children and grew up nearby at the Bay of Fundy home of his father, Henry John Bennett, in Hopewell Cape, the shire town of Albert County. Bennett's father descended from English ancestors who had emigrated to Connecticut in the 17th century. His great-great-grandfather, Zadock Bennett, migrated from New London, Connecticut, to Nova Scotia c. 1760, before the American Revolution, as one of the New England Planters who took the lands forcibly removed from the deported Acadians during the Great Upheaval.

The Bennetts had previously been a relatively prosperous family, operating a shipyard in Hopewell Cape, but the change to steam-powered vessels in the mid-19th century meant the gradual winding down of their business. However, the household was a literate one, subscribing to three newspapers. One of the largest and last ships launched by the Bennett shipyard (in 1869) was the Sir John A. Macdonald. In the 1870s depression, the shipbuilding business of Henry John Bennett appeared insufficient to support his family and some believed he was an ineffective businessman. Henry John had now become a merchant, blacksmith, and farmer. R. B. Bennett's early days inculcated a lifelong habit of thrift. The driving force in his family was his mother. She was a Wesleyan Methodist and passed this faith and the Protestant ethic on to her son. Bennett's father does not appear to have been a good provider for his family, though the reason is unclear. He operated a general store for a while and tried to develop some gypsum deposits.

Educated in the local school, Bennett was a very good student but something of a loner. In addition to his Protestant faith, Bennett grew up with an abiding love of the British Empire, then at its apogee. A small legacy his mother received opened the doors for him to attend the normal school in Fredericton, where he trained to be a teacher; he then taught for several years at Irishtown, north of Moncton, saving his money for law school. At age 18, Bennett became principal of a school in Douglastown, New Brunswick.

== University, early legal career (1890–1897) ==
Bennett enrolled at Dalhousie University in 1890, graduating in 1893 with a law degree and very high standing. He worked his way through with a job as assistant in the library and participated in debating and moot court activities. When James Lougheed needed a junior for his Calgary law office, Bennett was recommended by the dean, Dr. Richard Chapman Weldon.

Bennett was then a partner in the Chatham, New Brunswick, law firm of Tweedie and Bennett. Max Aitken (later to become Lord Beaverbrook) was his office boy. Aitken persuaded Bennett to run for alderman in the first Town Council of Chatham. Aitken managed Bennett's campaign and Bennett was elected by 19 votes out of 691 cast.

== Political, law, and business success (1897–1911) ==
Despite his election to the Chatham Town Council, Bennett's days in the town were numbered. In 1897, he moved to Calgary, North-West Territories. He negotiated to become the law partner of James Lougheed, Calgary's richest man and most successful lawyer. By 1905, Bennett was buying and selling land and was successful at it due to the law firm's retainer being the Canadian Pacific Railway. Bennett also invested in an oil company, Calgary Petroleum Products Company, and became director and solicitor. He also worked with Aitken to produce the Alberta Pacific Grain Company, Canada Cement, and Calgary Power. Bennett's reputation grew. Bennett described himself as a teetotaler (although he was known to occasionally drink alcohol when the press was not around).

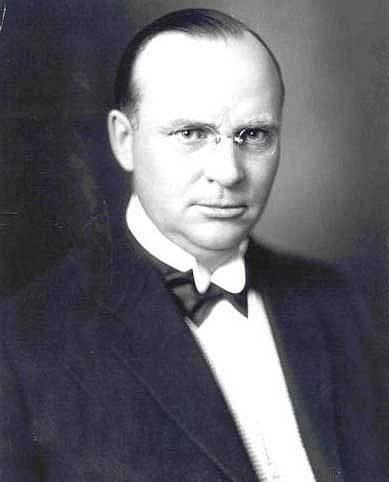
Young R. B. Bennett, 1901

Bennett was elected to the Legislative Assembly of the North-West Territories in the 1898 general election, representing the riding of West Calgary. Aitken managed this campaign too. Bennett was re-elected to a second term in office in 1902 as an independent. He gained the nickname "Bonfire Bennett" due to his extemporaneous, quick, and persuasive speaking manner.

In 1905, when Alberta was carved out of the Territories and made a province, Bennett became the first leader of the Alberta Conservative Party, though he lost in a landslide in that year's election to the Liberals. In 1909, he won a seat in the provincial legislature.

In 1908 Bennett was one of five people appointed to the first Library Board for the city of Calgary and was instrumental in establishing the Calgary Public Library. In 1910, Bennett became a director of Calgary Power Ltd. (now TransAlta Corporation) and just a year later he became president. His leadership projects completed included the first storage reservoir at Lake Minnewanka, a second transmission line to Calgary, and the construction of the Kananaskis Falls hydro station. At that time, he was also the director of Rocky Mountains Cement Company and Security Trust.

Bennett's corporate law firm included notable clients such as the Canadian Pacific Railway and Hudson's Bay Company. The law firm was in the Clarence Block building, at 122 8th Ave in Calgary, also known as the historic Stephen Avenue, which was owned by fellow partner in the firm, James Lougheed. The firm was on the second floor, above a Hartt Shoe Company retail store, a dress shoe manufacturer based in Bennett's home province of New Brunswick, of which he was known to be a customer. He worked with his childhood friend, Max Aitken, on many successful ventures, including stock purchases, land speculation, and the buying and merging of small companies. Before he was 40, Bennett was a multi-millionaire who lived in the Palliser Hotel. Though a lifelong bachelor, he dated women. In terms of personality, Bennett was accused of arrogance and of having a volatile temper. Bennett's wealth helped him become a philanthropist; he donated to schools, hospitals, charities, and individuals in need. He became richer when he started gaining control of the match company, E. B. Eddy Company, between 1906 and 1918. His growing control of the company occurred due to his longtime friendship with Jennie Grahl Hunter Eddy, who trusted Bennett with the company after her husband, Ezra Butler Eddy, died in 1906. By 1926, Bennett gained full control of the company. Bennett was one of the richest Canadians at that time. He helped put many poor, struggling young men through university.

== Early federal political career (1911–1917) ==
Bennett was elected to the House of Commons in the 1911 federal election as a Conservative candidate. Bennett did not always follow party policy; in one instance in 1914, he spoke against the Robert Borden-led Conservative government's bill to provide financial support to the Canadian Northern Railway.

At age 44, Bennett tried to enlist in the Canadian military once World War I broke out, but was turned down as being medically unfit, perhaps because he had lost two of his toes. In July 1915, Bennett became Borden's assistant to London; in this job, Bennett's responsibility was to find out how Canada could help Britain with its military and civilian needs. In 1916, Bennett was appointed director general of the National Service Board, which was in charge of identifying the number of potential recruits in the country.

While Bennett supported conscription, he opposed Borden's proposal for a Union Government that would include both Conservatives and pro-conscription Liberals, fearing that this would ultimately hurt the Conservative Party. While he campaigned for Conservative candidates in the 1917 federal election he did not stand for re-election himself.

== Out of politics (1917–1925) ==
In February 1918, Borden appointed Alberta Liberal William Harmer to the Senate to satisfy the Unionist coalition agreements. Bennett was reportedly furious at this move, believing that Borden broke a promise to appoint him to the Senate. Bennett wrote Borden a resentful 20-page letter. Borden never replied.

Borden's successor, Arthur Meighen, appointed Bennett minister of justice on September 21, 1921. In the federal election two and a half months later, Bennett ran for the riding of Calgary West but lost by 16 votes. In this election, the Conservatives sunk to third place.

Bennett developed an extensive legal practice in Calgary. In 1922, he started the partnership Bennett, Hannah & Sanford, which would eventually become Bennett Jones LLP. In 1929–30, he served as national President of the Canadian Bar Association. By the mid-1920s, Bennett was on the board of the Royal Bank of Canada (RBC). He was also a director of Metropolitan Life Insurance of New York.

== Political return and leader of the Official Opposition (1925–1930) ==
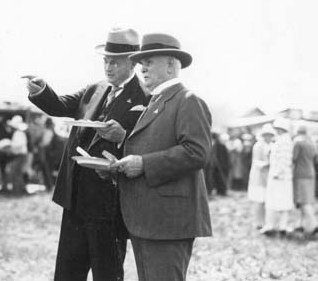
Businessman Patrick Burns and R. B. Bennett at the Calgary Stampede in 1928

After Meighen, who was attempting to become prime minister again, offered Bennett to be minister of justice, Bennett ran for and won the seat of Calgary West in the 1925 federal election. The Conservatives won the most seats but didn't have a majority. They didn't necessarily form government due to Liberal prime minister William Lyon Mackenzie King negotiating support from the Progressive Party. However, in the summer of 1926, the Conservatives were invited to form government by Lord Byng. Byng refused King's request to dissolve parliament and call an election, and thus King resigned. On July 2, the Meighen government was defeated in a motion of non-confidence by one vote, triggering an election scheduled for September 14. At the time of the confidence vote, Bennett was in Alberta campaigning on behalf the province's Conservative Party for the provincial election and thus was unable to vote against the motion. Meighen greatly regretted his absence and later wrote, "If Mr. Bennett had been there... King would never have talked the diabolical and dishonest rot in which he indulged. He was a lot more careful when Bennett was across the floor...".

In the election, the Liberals decisively won. In Meighen's short-lived government, Bennett served as minister of finance along with numerous acting portfolios. After this defeat, Meighen stepped down as Tory leader, triggering a leadership convention scheduled for October 1927. Bennett put himself forward as a candidate, but had little expectation of winning, believing along with most observers that the convention would either vote to reinstate Meighen, or confirm interim leader Hugh Guthrie as his permanent successor. In the event, Meighen lacked the support to attempt a comeback, while Guthrie's chances were ruined by a poorly received speech that alienated the Quebec delegates, allowing Bennett to emerge as a compromise candidate and win the leadership on the second ballot. In his acceptance speech, Bennett talked about how he became rich through hard work. Upon being elected leader, Bennett resigned his company directorships.

When Bennett became leader, the Conservative Party had no money. The party could not rely on support from newspapers as there were only 11 dailies considered Conservative. By February 1930, 27 full-time employees were using modern office equipment to spread the Conservative message across provinces. Bennett and senior party members donated $2,500 a month each to fund this enterprise and some provincial enterprises. By May 1930, Bennett had personally donated $500,000 (equivalent to $9,000,000 in 2025) to the party; one-fifth of that went to Quebec, where the Conservatives had been wiped out for the past four elections due to them imposing conscription in 1917.

As Opposition leader, Bennett faced off against Liberal prime minister William Lyon Mackenzie King in Commons debates and took some time to acquire enough experience to hold his own with King. In 1930, King blundered badly when he made overly partisan statements in response to criticism over his handling of the economic downturn, which was hitting Canada very hard. King's worst error was in stating that he "would not give Tory provincial governments a five-cent piece!" This serious mistake, which drew wide press coverage, gave Bennett his needed opening to attack King, which he did successfully in that year's election campaign. On election day, July 28, Bennett led the Conservatives to a majority government. Although he was the first prime minister representing a constituency in Alberta, his party only won four of the province's sixteen seats. The Conservatives also had their best result in Quebec since the 1911 federal election, going from 4 to 24 MPs.

== Prime Minister (1930–1935) ==
Bennett appointed himself as both finance minister and external Affairs minister after his victory, forming a government in the 17th Canadian Parliament. He worked an exhausting schedule throughout his years as prime minister, often more than 14 hours per day, and dominated his government. He lived in a suite in the Château Laurier hotel, a short walk from Parliament Hill. When responding to letters from citizens talking about the struggles they were facing, Bennett wrote back with personal notes and tucked cash into the envelopes.

=== Confronting the depression ===
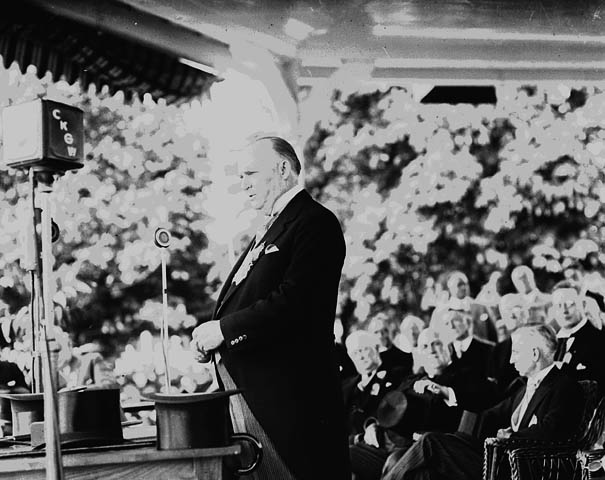
Prime Minister Bennett addressing a public meeting

Bennett had the misfortune of taking office during the Great Depression. He supported tariffs due to his belief that they would create markets for Canadian products. Bennett's government then passed the Unemployment Relief Act that provided $20 million for public works at the federal and local levels. In 1931, Bennett's government increased tariffs and passed the Unemployment and Farm Relief Act to invest in further public works and direct relief; similar acts would be passed each year until he left office in 1935.

The Conservative Party's pro-business and pro-banking inclinations provided little relief to the millions of increasingly desperate and agitated unemployed. Despite the economic crisis, "laissez-faire" persisted as the guiding economic principle of Conservative Party ideology; similar attitudes dominated worldwide as well during this era. Government relief to the unemployed was considered a disincentive to individual initiative and was therefore only granted in the most minimal amounts and attached to work programs. An additional concern of the federal government was that large numbers of disaffected unemployed men concentrating in urban centres created a volatile situation. As an "alternative to bloodshed on the streets", the stop-gap solution for unemployment chosen by the Bennett government was to establish military-run and -styled relief camps in remote areas throughout the country, where single unemployed men toiled for twenty cents a day. Any relief beyond this was left to provincial and municipal governments, many of which were either insolvent or on the brink of bankruptcy, and which railed against the inaction of other levels of government. Partisan differences began to sharpen on the question of government intervention in the economy, since lower levels of government were largely in Liberal hands, and protest movements were beginning to send their own parties into the political mainstream, notably the Cooperative Commonwealth Federation and William Aberhart's Social Credit Party in Alberta.

=== Trade with Britain ===
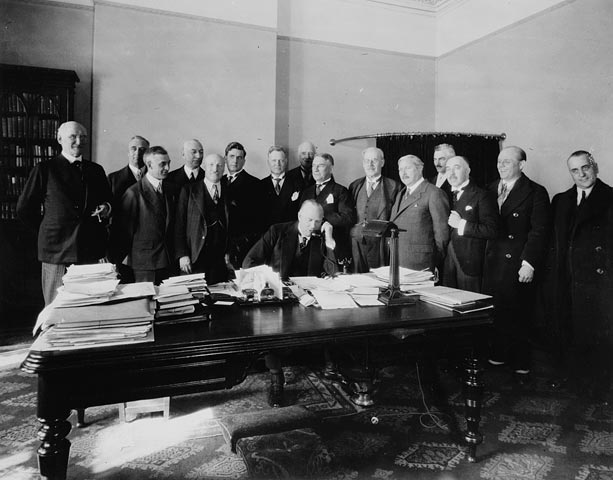
Prime Minister Bennett, surrounded by members of the Cabinet, speaking by telephone to George Perley, Canadian Cabinet minister, at the British Empire Trade Fair at Buenos Aires

At the 1930 Imperial Conference in London, England, Bennett unsuccessfully argued for an imperial preference free trade agreement. The proposal stunned the British government, despite them being pro-free trade. British newspaper The Observer asked, "Empire or not?" The Statute of Westminster in 1931 gave Canada and other dominions' autonomy in foreign affairs. Despite Bennett declaring, "We no longer live in a political Empire", he favoured "a new economic Empire"; he still wanted the imperial preferential trade arrangement. Britain introducing a general tariff of 10 percent gave Bennett hope.

Bennett hosted the 1932 Imperial Economic Conference in Ottawa; this was the first time Canada had hosted the meetings. It was attended by the leaders of the independent dominions of the British Empire (which later became the Commonwealth of Nations). On July 21, when the conference opened, Bennett gave his opening speech that suggested that Britain might have free entry into Canada for any products that would "not injuriously affect Canadian enterprise." The conference did not result in an imperial preference free trade agreement but did result in bilateral treaties. The bilateral treaty between Canada and Britain saw Canadian wheat, apples, and other natural products get British preferences while the British got Canadian preferences for certain metal products and textiles not made in Canada; Canada benefited from the treaty more than Britain and in a few years, Canadian exports to Britain were up 60 percent while British exports to Canada were up 5 percent.

=== Anti-communism ===
A nickname that would stick with Bennett for the remainder of his political career, "Iron Heel Bennett", came from a 1932 speech he gave in Toronto that ironically, if unintentionally, alluded to Jack London's socialist novel:

What do they offer you in exchange for the present order? Socialism, Communism, dictatorship. They are sowing the seeds of unrest everywhere. Right in this city such propaganda is being carried on and in the little out of the way places as well. And we know that throughout Canada this propaganda is being put forward by organizations from foreign lands that seek to destroy our institutions. And we ask that every man and woman put the iron heel of ruthlessness against a thing of that kind.

Reacting to fears of communist subversion, Bennett invoked the controversial Section 98 of the Criminal Code. Enacted in the aftermath of the Winnipeg general strike, Section 98 dispensed with the presumption of innocence in outlawing potential threats to the state: specifically, anyone belonging to an organization that officially advocated the violent overthrow of the government. Even if the accused had never committed an act of violence or personally supported such an action, they could be incarcerated merely for attending meetings of such an organization, publicly speaking in its defence, or distributing its literature. Despite the broad power authorized under section 98, it targeted specifically the Communist Party of Canada. Eight of the top party leaders, including Tim Buck, were arrested on 11 August 1931 and convicted under section 98.

=== Labour policy and relief camps ===
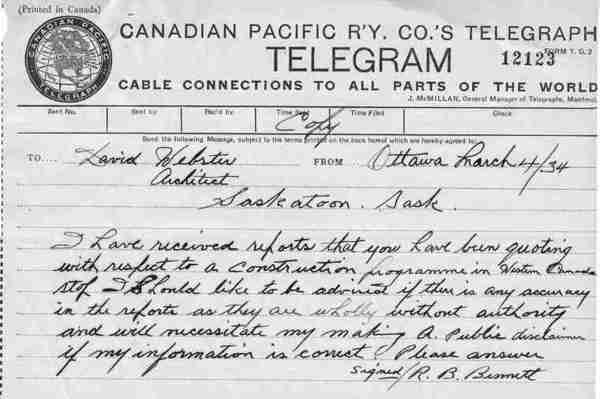
1934 telegram by Bennett concerning relief camps

By 1933, unemployment was at 27 percent and over 1.5 million Canadians were dependent on direct relief. In 1934, Bennett's government passed the Public Works Construction Act. This launched a federal building program worth $40 million and aimed at generating employment opportunities. In 1935, another public works bill was passed; the bill provided another $18 million for construction projects. Bennett's government created labour camps for unemployed single men; at the camps, they lived in bunkhouses and were paid 20 cents a day in return for a 44-hour week of toil.

Having survived Section 98, and benefiting from the public sympathy wrought by persecution, Communist Party members set out to organize workers in the relief camps set up by the Unemployment and Farm Relief Act. Camp workers laboured on a variety of infrastructure projects, including municipal airports, roads, and park facilities, along with a number of other make-work schemes. Conditions in the camps were poor, not only because of the low pay, but also the lack of recreational facilities, isolation from family and friends, poor quality food, and the use of military discipline. Communists thus had ample grounds on which to organize camp workers, although the workers were there of their own volition. The Relief Camp Workers' Union was formed and affiliated with the Workers' Unity League, the trade union umbrella of the Communist Party. Camp workers in BC struck on 4 April 1935, and, after two months of protesting in Vancouver, began the On-to-Ottawa Trek to bring their grievances to Bennett's doorstep. The prime minister and his minister of justice, Hugh Guthrie, treated the trek as an attempted insurrection and ordered it to be stopped. The Royal Canadian Mounted Police (RCMP) read the Riot Act to a crowd of 3,000 strikers and their supporters in Regina on 1 July 1935, resulting in two deaths and dozens of injured.

=== Agricultural policy ===
In 1934, Bennett's government passed the Farmers' Creditors Arrangement Act to make farm loans easier to acquire and allow families to remain on their farms rather than lose them to foreclosure. That same year, his government passed the Natural Products Marketing Act; in a bid to obtain better prices, a federal board with powers to arrange more orderly marketing was established. In 1935, Bennett's government passed the Prairie Farm Rehabilitation Act which established an enterprise that would eventually teach 100,000 farmers how to recover southern Saskatchewan from the Dust Bowl.

In 1935, through the Canadian Wheat Board Act, Bennett's government established the Canadian Wheat Board to market the wheat crop and to ensure an efficient sale of grain under difficult conditions. The act required Western Canadian farmers to sell all wheat and barley produced for human consumption to the Wheat Board.

=== Other initiatives ===
In 1932, Bennett's government launched the Canadian Radio Broadcasting Commission (CRBC) that regulated radio broadcasting to promote more Canadian content; the commission also established a publicly-owned national radio network that told Canadian stories to Canadians. In 1936, it became the Canadian Broadcasting Corporation (CBC).

Chartered banks in Canada controlled interest rates, the value of the Canadian dollar in the global market, and the amount of money in circulation; they also printed their own Canadian currency. In 1933, Bennett's government created the Royal Commission on Banking and Currency; the commission would result in the creation of the Bank of Canada in 1935 through the 1934 Bank of Canada Act, despite opposition from the chartered banks. The bank gained the powers from the chartered banks and gained the legal mandate to control Canada's monetary policy without interference from the federal government.

=== Bennett's New Deal ===
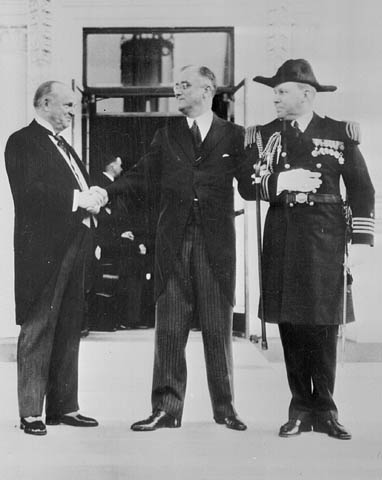
Bennett (left) meets American president Franklin Roosevelt (who is helped to stand up by his naval aide).

In January 1934, Bennett told the provinces that they were "wasteful and extravagant", and even told Quebec and Ontario that they were wealthy enough to manage their own problems. One year later, he had changed his tune. Following the lead of President Roosevelt's New Deal in the United States, Bennett, under the advice of William Duncan Herridge, who was Canada's Envoy to the United States, the government eventually began to follow the Americans' lead. In a series of live radio speeches to the nation in January 1935, Bennett introduced a Canadian version of the "New Deal", involving unprecedented public spending and federal intervention in the economy. Progressive income taxation, a minimum wage, a maximum number of working hours per week, unemployment insurance, health insurance, an expanded pension program, and grants to farmers were all included in the plan.

In one of his addresses to the nation, Bennett said:

In the last five years great changes have taken place in the world ... The old order is gone. We are living in conditions that are new and strange to us. Canada on the dole is like a young and vigorous man in the poorhouse ... If you believe that things should be left as they are, you and I hold contrary and irreconcilable views. I am for reform. And in my mind, reform means government intervention. It means government control and regulation. It means the end of laissez-faire.

Some of the measures were alleged to have encroached on provincial jurisdictions laid out in section 92 of the British North America Act, 1867. The courts, including the Judicial Committee of the Privy Council, agreed and eventually struck down virtually all of Bennett's reforms.

=== Internal divisions and defeat ===
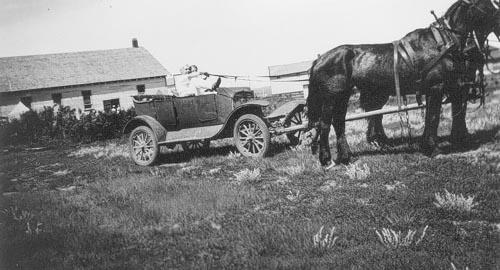
A "Bennett buggy", drawn by a horse because of lack of money to pay for gas

Bennett's conversion from small government to big government was seen as too little too late, and he faced criticism that his reforms either went too far, or did not go far enough, including from his minister of trade and commerce, H. H. Stevens, who bolted the government to form the Reconstruction Party of Canada. By 1934, Bennett was facing major dissent from Conservative quarters and the public. Car owners, for example, who could no longer afford gasoline, had horses pull their vehicles, which they named "Bennett buggies". To make matters worse, Bennett suffered a heart attack in March 1935.

The beneficiary of the overwhelming opposition during Bennett's tenure was the Liberal Party. The Tories were decimated in the October 1935 general election, winning only 40 seats to 173 for Mackenzie King's Liberals. At the time, this was the worst defeat for a governing party at the federal level. The Reconstruction Party won 8.7% of the popular vote as a result of gaining support from disgruntled Conservatives. The Tories would not form a majority government again in Canada until 1958. King's government soon implemented its own moderate reforms, including the repeal of relief camps, a reciprocal trade agreement with the United States, and the repeal of Section 98. Ultimately, Canada pulled out of the depression as a result of government-funded jobs associated with the preparation for and onset of the Second World War.

== Retirement, House of Lords, and death (1935–1947) ==
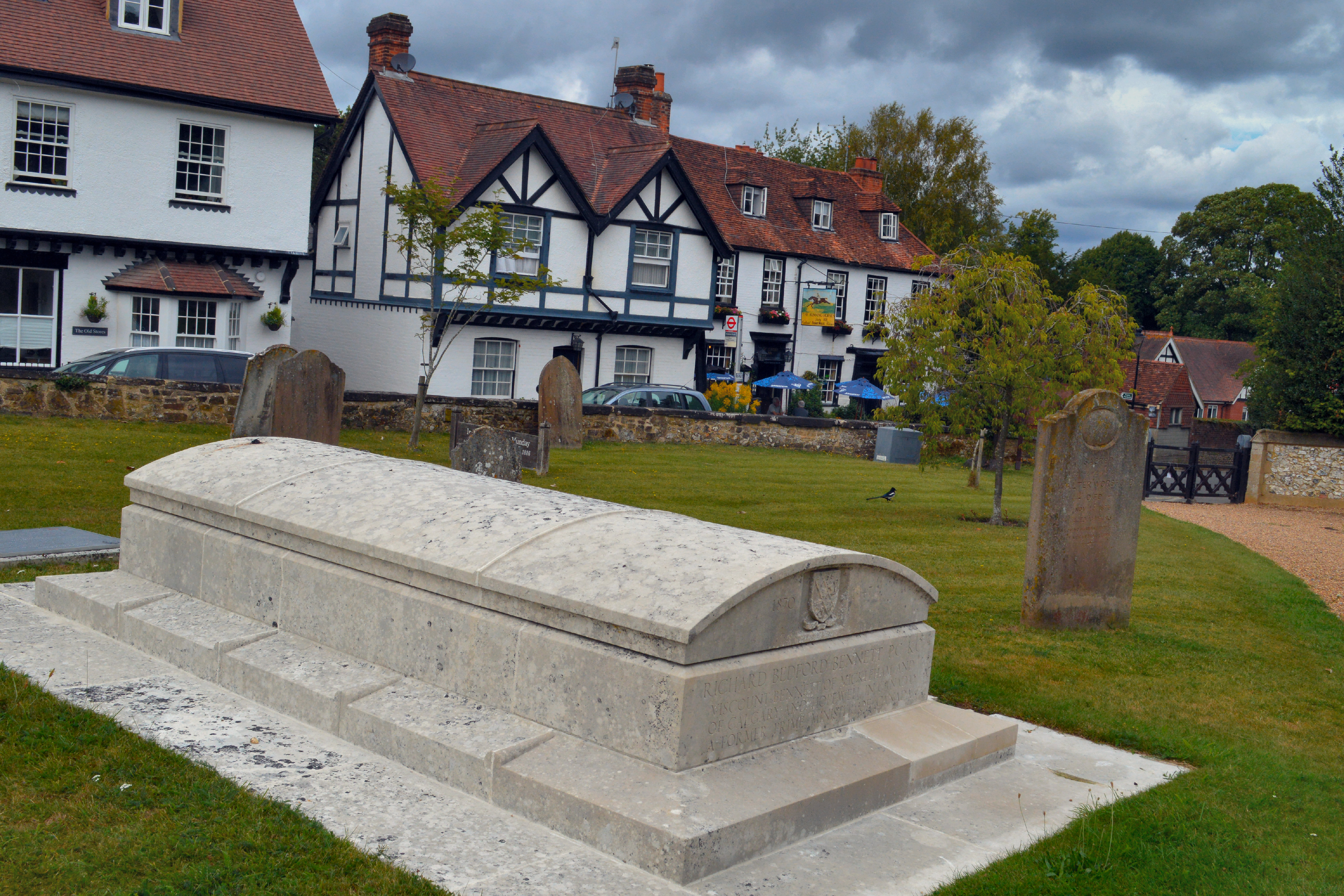
Grave, St. Michael's Churchyard, Mickleham

Bennett led the Conservative Party and Opposition for the next three years until he was succeeded by his former Cabinet minister Robert James Manion in the July 1938 leadership convention. Bennett moved to England on January 28, 1939, and resigned his Calgary West seat that same day. He purchased a 94-acre (38 ha) property in Surrey called Juniper Hill, an 18th-century (c. 1780) mansion built for David Jenkinson and located across from Juniper Hall on Downs Road); this was the first home Bennett owned as he had only lived in the Calgary Palliser Hotel and the Château Laurier Hotel in Ottawa in his adult life.

On June 12, 1941, Bennett became the only former Canadian prime minister to be elevated to the peerage as Viscount Bennett, of Mickleham in the County of Surrey and of Calgary and Hopewell in the Dominion of Canada. The honour, conferred on the recommendation of British PM Winston Churchill, was in recognition for Bennett's valuable unsalaried work in the Ministry of Aircraft Production, managed by his lifelong friend Lord Beaverbrook. Bennett took an active role in the House of Lords and attended frequently until his death. He also participated in many speaking engagements and served on various boards.

Bennett's interest in increasing public awareness and accessibility to Canada's historical records led him to serve as vice-president of the Champlain Society from 1933 until his death.

By March 1947, Bennett sold nearly all of his investments; it became clear his health was declining. Bennett died after suffering a heart attack while taking a bath on June 26, 1947, at Mickleham. He was exactly one week shy of his 77th birthday. He is buried there in St. Michael's Churchyard, Mickleham. The tomb, and Government of Canada marker outside, are steps from the front doors of the church. He is the only deceased Canadian prime minister not buried in Canada.

== Legacy and assessments ==
Textbooks typically portray Bennett as a hard-driving capitalist, pushing for American-style high tariffs and British-style imperialism, while ignoring his reform efforts.

Bennett took note of and encouraged the young Lester Pearson in the early 1930s, and appointed Pearson to significant roles on two major government inquiries: the 1931 Royal Commission on Grain Futures, and the 1934 Royal Commission on Price Spreads. Bennett saw that Pearson was recognized with an OBE after he shone in that work, arranged a bonus of $1,800, and invited him to a London conference. Former prime minister John Turner, who as a child, knew Bennett while he was prime minister, praised Bennett's promotion of Turner's economist mother to the highest civil service post held by a Canadian woman to that time.

=== Criticisms ===
Most historians consider his premiership to have been a failure at a time of severe economic crisis. H. Blair Neatby says categorically that "as a politician, he was a failure". Jack Granatstein and Norman Hillmer, comparing him to all other Canadian prime ministers concluded, "Bennett utterly failed as a leader. Everyone was alienated by the end—Cabinet, caucus, party, voter and foreigner."

Bennett was ranked #12 by a survey of Canadian historians out of the then 20 Prime Ministers of Canada through Jean Chrétien. The results of the survey were included in the book Prime Ministers: Ranking Canada's Leaders by J. L. Granatstein and Norman Hillmer.

A 2001 book by Quebec nationalist writer Normand Lester, Le Livre noir du Canada anglais (later translated as The Black Book of English Canada) accused Bennett of having a political affiliation with, and of having provided financial support to, fascist Quebec writer Adrien Arcand. This is based on a series of letters sent to Bennett following his election as prime minister by Arcand, his colleague Ménard and two Conservative caucus members asking for financial support for Arcand's antisemitic newspaper Le Goglu.

== Supreme Court appointments ==
As Prime Minister, Bennett nominated four justices to the Supreme Court of Canada and elevated Sir Lyman Poore Duff to the role of Chief Justice of Canada. Supreme Court historians Snell and Vaughan note that Bennett's appointments showed significant care and thoughtfulness. Bennett continued the traditions of balancing regional and religious appointments, and there is limited evidence of political influence in appointments, besides that of Oswald Smith Crocket. With the appointment of Crocket, Bennett had struggled to find a suitable candidate from New Brunswick. He resorted to writing Premier Charles Dow Richards that there was "no one in New Brunswick fitted by training and experience to become a member of the [Supreme] Court." Bennett considered Crocket a personal friend, but hesitated because Crocket's judicial experience was limited to the trial level, with no appellate background.

Bennett chose the following jurists to be appointed as justices of the Supreme Court of Canada by the Governor General:

- Oswald Smith Crocket (21 September 1932 – 13 April 1943)
- Frank Joseph Hughes (17 March 1933 – 13 February 1935)
- Sir Lyman Poore Duff (as Chief Justice, (17 March 1933 – 2 January 1944; appointed a Puisne Justice under Prime Minister Laurier, 4 June 1906)
- Henry Hague Davis (31 January 1935 – 30 June 1944)
- Patrick Kerwin (20 July 1935 – 2 February 1963)

== Other appointments ==
Bennett was Honorary Colonel of the 103rd Regiment (Calgary Rifles) from 1914 to the dissolution of the regiment in 1920. Bennett was the Honorary Colonel of the Calgary Highlanders from the year of their designation as such in 1921 to his death in 1947. He visited the Regiment in England during the Second World War, and always ensured the 1st Battalion had a turkey dinner at Christmas every year they were overseas, including the Christmas of 1944 when the battalion was holding front line positions in the Nijmegen Salient.

Bennett served as the Rector of Queen's University in Kingston, Ontario, from 1935 to 1937, even while he was still prime minister. At the time, this role covered mediation for significant disputes between Queen's students and the university administration.

== Publications ==
Empire Relations: The Peter le Neve Foster Lecture, Delivered on June 3rd, 1942, at the Royal Society of Arts by the Right Hon. the Viscount Bennett, P.C., K.C. London: Dorothy Crisp, 1945.

== Honours ==
=== Hereditary peerage ===
Bennett was elevated to a hereditary peerage on 16 July 1941. He took the title 1st Viscount Bennett, of Mickleham in the County of Surrey and of Calgary and Hopewell in the Dominion of Canada. The peerage became extinct upon his death on 26 June 1947.

=== Honours ===
Location	Date	Decoration	Post-nominal letters
Alberta	1907 – 26 June 1947	King's Counsel	KC
United Kingdom	1930 – 26 June 1947	Member of His Majesty's Most Honourable Privy Council	PC
United Kingdom	Before 26 June 1947	Knight of Grace of the Order of St John	KG.StJ

== Scholastic ==
Chancellor, visitor, governor, rector and fellowships

Location	Date	School	Position
Ontario	Before 26 June 1947	Queen's University	Rector

=== Honorary degrees ===
Location	Date	School	Degree	Gave Commencement Address
Nova Scotia	1919	Dalhousie University	Doctor of Laws (LL.D)	
Ontario	1926	Queen's University	Doctor of Laws (LL.D)	
Ontario	1931	University of Toronto	Doctor of Laws (LL.D)	
New Brunswick	May 1933	University of New Brunswick	Doctor of Laws (LL.D)	

== Freedom of the City ==
- England 4 November 1930: London.

== Memberships and fellowships ==
Location	Date	Organisation	Position
Canada	Before 26 June 1947	Royal Canadian Geographical Society	Fellow

== Honorary military appointments ==
- Canadian Army (1914 – 1920): Honorary Colonel of the 103rd Regiment (Calgary Rifles)
- Canadian Army (1921 – 26 June 1947): Honorary Colonel of the Calgary Highlanders

== Arms ==
Coat of arms of R. B. Bennett
Notes Bennett's coat of arms was designed by Alan Beddoe. Adopted 1941 Coronet Coronet of a Viscount Crest A demi-lion Gules grasping in the dexter paw a battle-axe Or and resting the sinister paw on an escallop Gules Helm Helm of a peer Escutcheon Argent within two bendlets Gules three maple leaves proper all between two demi-lions couped Gules Supporters Dexter a bison, sinister a moose, both standing on a grassy mount proper Motto PREMI NON OPPRIMI (Latin for 'To be pressed, not oppressed')

== See also ==
- List of prime ministers of Canada
- Great Depression in Canada
- Canadian peers and baronets

Party political offices
Preceded by Hugh Guthrie	Leader of the Conservative Party; 1927–1938	Succeeded by Robert Manion
Political offices
Preceded by Charles Doherty	Minister of Justice; 1921	Succeeded by Lomer Gouin
Preceded by Sir Henry Drayton	Minister of Finance; 1926	Succeeded by James Alexander Robb
Preceded by Henry Herbert Stevens	Superintendent-General of Indian Affairs; 1926	Succeeded by Charles Stewart
Preceded by Henry Herbert Stevens	Minister of the Interior; 1926	Succeeded by Charles Stewart
Preceded by Henry Herbert Stevens	Minister of Mines; 1926	Succeeded by Charles Stewart
Preceded by Arthur Meighen	Leader of the Opposition; 1927–1930	Succeeded by W. L. Mackenzie King
Preceded by W. L. Mackenzie King	Superintendent-General of Indian Affairs; 1930–1935	Succeeded by W. L. Mackenzie King
Preceded by W. L. Mackenzie King	Secretary of State for External Affairs; 1930–1935	Succeeded by W. L. Mackenzie King
Preceded by W. L. Mackenzie King	President of the Privy Council; 1930–1935	Succeeded by W. L. Mackenzie King
Preceded by Charles Dunning	Minister of Finance; 1930–1932	Succeeded by Edgar Rhodes
Preceded by Mackenzie King	Leader of the Opposition; 1935–1938	Succeeded by Robert Manion
Legislative Assembly of the Northwest Territories
Preceded by Oswald Critchley	MLA West Calgary; 1898–1905	Succeeded by District Abolished
Legislative Assembly of Alberta
Preceded by William Henry Cushing	MLA Calgary; 1909–1911	Succeeded by Thomas Tweedie
Preceded by Albert Robertson	Leader of the Official Opposition in Alberta; 1910	Succeeded by Edward Michener
Parliament of Canada
Preceded by Maitland Stewart McCarthy	Member of Parliament Calgary; 1911–1917	Succeeded by District Abolished
Preceded by Joseph Tweed Shaw	Member of Parliament Calgary West; 1925–1939	Succeeded by Douglas Cunnington
Peerage of the United Kingdom
New creation	Viscount Bennett; 1941–1947	Extinct
