= James Allen Byrne =

Canadian politician

James Allen (Jim) Byrne
- Official 1966 portrait

Member of Parliament for Kootenay East
- In office 1949–1958
- Preceded by: James Herbert Matthews
- Succeeded by: Murray McFarlane

Member of Parliament for Kootenay East
- In office 1962–1968
- Preceded by: Murray L. McFarlane
- Succeeded by: Stan Graham

Personal details
- Born: 27 January 1911 Grand Rapids, Minnesota, U.S.
- Died: 5 September 1975 (aged 64)
- Party: Liberal
- Profession: Miner

James Allen Byrne (27 January 1911 – 5 September 1975) was a Liberal party member of the House of Commons of Canada. He was born in Grand Rapids, Minnesota, United States and became a miner by career.

He was first elected at the Kootenay East riding in the 1949 general election, then re-elected there in the 1953, 1957, 1962, 1963 and 1965 elections.

Byrne was not in Parliament for one term during this time due to his defeat in the 1958 election by Murray McFarlane of the Progressive Conservative party.

Byrne was Parliamentary Secretary to the Minister of Transport from 1966 to 1968, and also served as Parliamentary Secretary to the Minister of Labour from 1963 to 1965.
