= Frank William Green =

Canadian politician (1876–1953)

Frank William Green M.D., C.M., F.A.C.S.
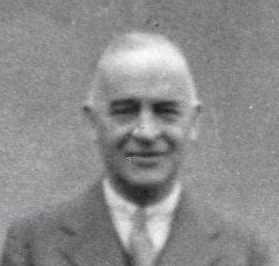

MLA for Cranbrook
- In office 1941–1949
- Preceded by: Arnold McGrath
- Succeeded by: Leo Thomas Nimsick

Personal details
- Born: March 15, 1876 Victoria, British Columbia
- Died: December 24, 1953 (aged 77) Cranbrook, British Columbia
- Party: Conservative, coalition
- Spouse(s): Lillian Barbara Staples (m. 8 Jun 1905)
- Children: William Otis Green
- Occupation: physician, surgeon

Frank William Green (March 15, 1876 – December 24, 1953) was a Canadian physician and politician.

Green was born in Victoria, British Columbia, in 1876 to Alexander Alfred Green and Theophila Turner Raines. He attended Corrig College at Victoria. After the death of his father in 1891, Green relocated to Montreal to attend McGill University where he would obtain his medical degree. Upon his graduation from McGill in 1898, Green worked as a physician on the construction of the Canadian Pacific Railway Crowsnest Pass line, in the Kootenay Valley, working on horseback. During the time he operated a hospital and treated many during an epidemic of typhoid.

He later settled at Cranbrook, British Columbia, in the Kootenay Valley in 1899 to establish a medical practice. He was one of the first and only physicians, a medical pioneer at Cranbrook. A partnership with Dr. James Horace King of Cranbrook which started in 1903 was described as a "cornerstone in local medicine", with modern innovations being in use at the time, two examples being the first x-ray machine in the city being purchased for their hospital and the use of automobiles within the practice.

In the 1941 British Columbia general election, Green was elected as a Conservative to the Legislative Assembly of British Columbia for the district of Cranbrook. He was elected again in 1945 as a coalition member, serving until his retirement in 1949.

He married Lillian Barbara Staples of Stillwater, Minnesota, in June 1905. One of his sons, William Otis Green also became a doctor in the Cranbrook area, with whom he later shared a practice with. Frank W. Green died in 1953 of heart problems at St. Eugene Hospital in Cranbrook, which he had established. He was later cremated in Calgary. His wife Lillian died on October 22, 1965, at Cranbrook.

The F. W. Green Medical Centre and F. W. Green Memorial Home continuing care centre at Cranbrook are both named after him.

== Electoral history ==
20th British Columbia election, 1941
Party	Candidate	Votes	%	±	Expenditures
Co-operative Commonwealth Fed.	Oscar Albin Eliasin	1,548	33.89%		unknown
Conservative	Frank William Green	1,615	35.35%		unknown
Liberal	Arnold Joseph McGrath	1,405	30.76%		unknown
Total valid votes		4,568	100.00%		
Total rejected ballots		52			
Turnout		%			

21st British Columbia election, 1945
Party	Candidate	Votes	%	±	Expenditures
Labor-Progressive	William Brown	193	4.56%		unknown
Co-operative Commonwealth Fed.	Henry Gammon	1,965	46.40%		unknown
Coalition	Frank William Green	2,077	49.04%	–	unknown
Total valid votes		4,235	100.00%		
Total rejected ballots		40			
Turnout		%			
