= Arnold McGrath =

Canadian politician

Arnold J. McGrath

Member of the Legislative Assembly of British Columbia
- In office 1939–1941
- Preceded by: Frank Mitchell MacPherson
- Succeeded by: Frank William Green
- Constituency: Cranbrook

Personal details
- Born: June 2, 1912 Dodsland, Saskatchewan
- Died: August 24, 1967 (aged 55) Calgary, Alberta
- Party: British Columbia Liberal Party
- Education: University of Saskatchewan; University of Toronto
- Occupation: salesman, manager

Arnold Joseph McGrath (June 2, 1912 – August 24, 1967) was a Canadian politician. He served in the Legislative Assembly of British Columbia from 1939 to 1941 from the electoral district of Cranbrook, a member of the Liberal party. He was the youngest member of the legislature during his term of service. McGrath died in Calgary in 1967.
