= Wallinger =

Wallinger is a surname which may refer to:

- Sir Geoffrey Wallinger (1903–1979), British ambassador
- Sir John Wallinger (1869–1931), British intelligence officer
- Karl Wallinger (1957–2024), Welsh musician, songwriter and record producer
- Mark Wallinger (born 1959), British artist
- Noel Wallinger (1865–1948), English-born miner, civil servant and political figure in British Columbia, Canada
- Dirk Wallinger (birth year unknown), CEO, York Space Systems
