= Results of the 1935 Canadian federal election =

1935 Canadian federal election

== Results by Province and Territory ==
=== Alberta ===
Results in Alberta
Party	Seats	Second	Third	Fourth	Fifth	Sixth	Votes	%	+/-
Social Credit	15	1	1			1	111,627	46.56	
Liberals	1	9	5	2			51,742	21.58	
Conservative	1	4	5	4	1		42,314	17.65	
CCF		3	6	5			28,870	12.04	
Communist				1	1		2,672	1.11	
Reconstruction					3		1,785	0.74	
Technocrat				1			733	0.31	
Total	17						239,743	100.0	

=== British Columbia ===
Results in British Columbia
Party	Seats	Second	Third	Fourth	Fifth	Votes	%	+/-
CCF	3	8	4			94,404	32.69	
Liberals	6	5	4			91,729	31.76	
Conservative	5	3	7			71,894	24.9	
Reconstruction	1		1	10	2	20,959	7.26	
Independent	1				1	5,196	1.8	
Social Credit				1	1	1,796	0.62	
Communist				1		1,555	0.54	
Labour Farmer				1		999	0.35	
Socialist					1	251	0.09	
Total	16					288,783	100.0	

=== Manitoba ===
Results in Manitoba
Party	Seats	Second	Third	Fourth	Fifth	Sixth	Seventh	Votes	%	+/-
Liberals	10	3	1					89,181	31.74	
Conservative	1	12	2	1				75,574	26.9	
CCF	2	2	7	2	1			54,491	19.39	
Liberal-Progressive	4		1					29,569	10.52	
Reconstruction			3	6	3			16,439	5.85	
Communist			2					9,229	3.28	
Social Credit				2	3	1		5,751	2.05	
Independent Liberal						1		478	0.17	
Independent							1	280	0.1	
Total	17							280,992	100.0	

=== New Brunswick ===
Results in New Brunswick
Party	Seats	Second	Third	Fourth	Votes	%	+/-
Liberals	9	1			100,537	57.2	
Conservative	1	9			56,145	31.94	
Reconstruction			8		16,966	9.65	
Independent			1		1,442	0.82	
Independent Liberal				1	672	0.38	
Total	10				175,762	100.0	

=== Nova Scotia ===
Results in Nova Scotia
Party	Seats	Second	Third	Fourth	Fifth	Votes	%	+/-
Liberals	12					142,334	51.99	
Conservative		10	1			87,893	32.11	
Reconstruction		1	7	2	1	38,175	13.94	
Communist			1			5,365	1.96	
Total	12					273,767	100.0	

=== Ontario ===
Results in Ontario
Party	Seats	Second	Third	Fourth	Fifth	Sixth	Seventh	Votes	%	+/-
Liberals	56	22	2	2				672,742	42.2	
Conservative	25	52	3	2				571,349	35.84	
Reconstruction		2	51	22	2			180,948	11.35	
CCF		2	23	23	2			127,927	8.02	
Independent Liberal		2		1	2	1		9,767	0.61	
Communist			1	1	3			7,784	0.49	
Labour Farmer		1						7,288	0.46	
United Farmers of Ontario-Labour	1							7,210	0.45	
Anti-Communist		1						3,961	0.25	
Independent					3		1	2,708	0.17	
Unknown			1					2,563	0.16	
Total	82							1,594,247	100.0	

=== Prince Edward Island ===
Results in Prince Edward Island
Party	Seats	Second	Third	Fourth	Fifth	Votes	%	+/-
Liberals	4					35,757	58.19	
Conservative		3	1			23,602	38.41	
Reconstruction			1	1	1	2,089	3.4	
Total	4					61,448	100.0	

=== Quebec ===
Results in Quebec
Party	Seats	Second	Third	Fourth	Fifth	Sixth	Seventh	Eighth	Ninth	Tenth	Eleventh	Votes	%	+/-
Liberals	59	7	2	1								642,141	56.01	
Conservative	5	44	9	3	1							322,794	28.15	
Reconstruction		9	25	5	1	1	1					106,523	9.29	
Independent Liberal	1	2	8	3	1	1						43,322	3.78	
Independent		1		1	3							7,581	0.66	
CCF		1		2								7,326	0.64	
Labour Farmer				2	1							6,136	0.54	
Verdun			1									4,214	0.37	
Communist		1										3,385	0.3	
Independent Reconstruction Party				1								865	0.08	
Unknown			1	1								844	0.07	
Liberal-Labour				1	1		1					708	0.06	
Independent Conservative						1		1			1	382	0.03	
Independent Labour									1			221	0.02	
Veterans Party										1		79	0.01	
Total	65											1,146,521	100.0	

=== Saskatchewan ===
Results in Saskatchewan
Party	Seats	Second	Third	Fourth	Fifth	Votes	%	+/-
Liberals	16	5				141,121	40.84	
CCF	2	4	10	5		73,505	21.27	
Conservative	1	6	5	4	1	62,287	18.02	
Social Credit	2	5	5	8		61,505	17.8	
Reconstruction		1		1	1	4,361	1.26	
Communist			1	1		2,791	0.81	
Total	21					345,570	100.0	

=== Yukon ===
Results in Yukon
Party	Seats	Second	Votes	%	+/-
Independent Conservative	1		696	55.64	
Liberals		1	555	44.36	
Total	1		1,251	100.0	
