= Frank Mitchell MacPherson =

Canadian politician

The Honourable Frank M. MacPherson
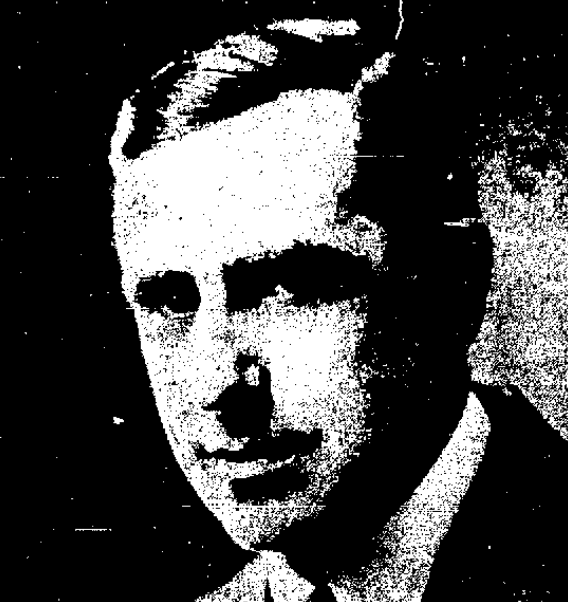

MLA for Cranbrook
- In office 1928–1939
- Preceded by: Noel Stirling Austin Arnold Wallinger
- Succeeded by: Arnold Joseph McGrath

Personal details
- Born: March 29, 1884 Wooler, Ontario, Canada
- Died: November 11, 1981 (aged 97) Ottawa, Ontario, Canada
- Party: Liberal
- Spouse(s): Edythe Lawrie (m. 21 Jul 1909); Elsie Smith
- Occupation: funeral director

Frank Mitchell MacPherson (March 29, 1884 – November 11, 1981) was a Canadian politician and funeral director.

MacPherson was born to Peter MacPherson, and Mary McCaw at Wooler, Ontario. He attended public schooling at Smith Falls, Ontario and Kingston, Ontario. He came to Cranbrook around 1910. In Cranbrook he owned the Hanson Garage Company and operated F. M. MacPherson Funeral Service. He also served as an alderman on the Cranbrook City Council.

He was elected to the Legislative Assembly of British Columbia at the 1928 British Columbia general election, running for the Liberal party, defeating Conservative incumbent Noel Stirling Austin Arnold Wallinger. He would be re-elected in 1933 and again in 1937. In 1933 he was appointed by premier Thomas Dufferin Pattullo as minister of public works. He served in that capacity until 1939. In 1944 Macpherson was serving as Commissioner of the Board of Transport Commission of Canada. At the time he resided in Ottawa and had retired from his businesses in Cranbrook.

He married Edythe Lawrie July 21, 1909. With her he had two sons, Marshall Frank in 1913 and Allan Mitchell. He died in Ottawa on November 11, 1981.

== Electoral history ==
17th British Columbia election, 1928
Party	Candidate	Votes	%	±	Expenditures
Liberal	Frank Mitchell MacPherson	1,833	52.46%		unknown
Conservative	Noel Stirling Austin Arnold Wallinger	1,661	47.54%		unknown
Total valid votes		3,494	100.00%		
Total rejected ballots		55			
Turnout		%			

18th British Columbia election, 1933
Party	Candidate	Votes	%	±	Expenditures
United Front (Workers and Farmers)	Robert Adams	62	1.46%	–	unknown
Co-operative Commonwealth Fed.	Charles Bennett	1,231	29.01%		unknown
Liberal	Frank Mitchell MacPherson	2,951	69.53%		unknown
Total valid votes		4,244	100.00%		
Total rejected ballots		33			
Turnout		%			

18th British Columbia election, 1937
Party	Candidate	Votes	%	±	Expenditures
Liberal	Frank Mitchell MacPherson	3,110	76.73%		unknown
Co-operative Commonwealth Fed.	Samuel Smith Shearer	943	23.27%		unknown
Total valid votes		4,053	100.00%		
Total rejected ballots		79			
Turnout		%			
