= Saul Bonnell =

Canadian politician (1871–1973)

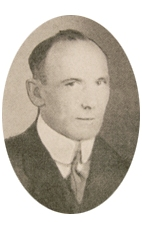

Member of the Canadian Parliament for Kootenay East
- In office 1917–1921
- Preceded by: Riding created from Kootenay
- Succeeded by: Robert Ethelbert Beattie

Personal details
- Born: December 29, 1871 Near Petites, Newfoundland
- Died: March 21, 1973 (aged 101) Vancouver, British Columbia, Canada
- Party: Unionist Party
- Spouse: Maud Eva McKeown
- Occupation: Physician

Saul Bonnell (December 29, 1871 – March 21, 1973) was a Canadian politician and physician. Bonnell's early life and career was spent in the Canadian Maritimes before he joined the Canadian Pacific Railway and was sent to British Columbia, where he established and worked in several local hospitals. He was mayor of Fernie, British Columbia in 1907, but put his political career on hold to serve with the Canadian Army Medical Corps during World War I. Returning from overseas in 1917, he was elected to the House of Commons of Canada in that year's federal election as the representative of the newly created Kootenay East riding and served until his defeat in 1921. Following this he returned to practicing medicine until his retirement and died at the age of 101 in March 1973.

== Early life ==
Bonnell was born December 29, 1871, near Petites, Newfoundland Colony the son of sailing master Saul Bonnell and his wife Mary Scott. His family moved to Halifax, Nova Scotia when the younger Bonnell was two years old, and this was where he was raised and received his primary and secondary education. He eventually attended Mount Allison University in Sackville, New Brunswick and graduated from this institution in 1892. He then entered Montreal's McGill University to earn a medical degree, which he received in 1896. Returning to Halifax, he spent almost a year working as a surgeon at the city's Royal Victoria Hospital before establishing a private practice in Bridgewater, Nova Scotia. He sold this practice in 1898 and joined the Canadian Pacific Railway Company, which sent him to Coal Creek, British Columbia to work as a surgeon at the local hospital.

While working for the affiliated Crow's Nest Pass Coal Company, Bonnell helped establish the first hospital in Fernie, British Columbia, a city that had been founded in 1898. He acted a supervisor for this hospital, as well as ones in nearby Michel and Elko, British Columbia, and was also contracted to the Great Northern Railway Company of Canada. He also served the provincial government as a health officer. He was working in the area on May 22, 1902, the day of one of the worst mining disasters in Canadian history, where 143 miners were asphyxiated after a cave-in near Coal Creek and Fernie.

== Political career ==
Bonnell served as the mayor of Fernie, British Columbia in 1907. During World War I he enlisted with the Royal Canadian Army Medical Corps and served overseas in Greece from 1915 through 1917. He was discharged officially with the rank of captain on April 3, 1918. Upon his return he stood for election in the newly created riding of Kootenay East, which had branched off from the Kootenay electoral district, in the 1917 Canadian federal election. A member of the Unionist Party of Canada, he was elected to the House of Commons of Canada and served for nearly four years. By the time of the 1921 federal election he represented the Conservative Party of Canada, following the disintegration of the Unionist Party, and was defeated by Robert Ethelbert Beattie of the Liberal Party of Canada, who had been his opponent in 1917. Following this loss, Bonnell held no further major political positions.

== Later life ==
After the end of his political career, Bonnell continued to work as a physician until his retirement. He married Maud Eva McKeown in 1899 in Saint John, New Brunswick and had three children, Constance, Franklin Harrison, and Eva. Franklin, born in 1903 in Fernie, became a lawyer. Saul outlived his son, who died in 1967, by nearly six years, as he died March 21, 1973, in Vancouver, British Columbia at the age of 101.
