= George MacKinnon (politician) =

Canadian politician (1879–1969)

Member of Parliament for Kootenay East
- In office March 1940 – April 1945
- Preceded by: Henry Herbert Stevens
- Succeeded by: James Herbert Matthews

Personal details
- Born: George Ernest Lawson MacKinnon; 12 December 1879 Alexandria, Ontario, Canada
- Died: 25 October 1969 (aged 89)
- Party: National Government
- Spouse(s): Helen Ainsworth Giegerich m. 1 November 1921
- Profession: physician

George Ernest Lawson MacKinnon (12 December 1879 – 25 October 1969) was a National Government party member of the House of Commons of Canada. He was born in Alexandria, Ontario and became a physician by career.

Born at Alexandria, Glengarry County, Ontario, on 12 December 1879, the son of a blacksmith, he graduated M.D. at McGill University of Montreal in 1902. he came west as a CPR doctor and settled in Cranbrook BC in 1905. He married Helen Ainsworth Geigerich of Kaslo, British Columbia and had two children, a son, George and a daughter, Margaret. He practised general medicine in the Kootenay District from 1908 until his retirement in 1940. He was first elected to Parliament for the Kootenay East riding in the Canadian federal election, 1940 general election. After completing his only term, the 19th Canadian Parliament, MacKinnon did not seek re-election in the Canadian federal election, 1945 federal election. MacKinnon was honoured by the city of Cranbrook in 1955 for his service to the community both as a doctor and a politician.
