= Kootenay East =

Former federal electoral district in British Columbia, Canada

British Columbia electoral district

Defunct federal electoral district
- Legislature: House of Commons
- District created: 1976
- District abolished: 1996
- First contested: 1979
- Last contested: 1993

Kootenay East (also known as Kootenay East—Revelstoke) was a federal electoral district in British Columbia, Canada, that was represented in the House of Commons of Canada from 1917 to 1968 and from 1979 to 1997. This riding was created as "Kootenay East" in 1914 from parts of Kootenay riding. It was abolished in 1966 when it was redistributed into Kootenay West and Okanagan—Kootenay ridings.

The riding initially consisted of the provincial electoral districts of Cranbrook, Fernie and Columbia. Its boundaries were adjusted in 1924, 1933, and 1947. It was recreated in 1976 as "Kootenay East" from parts of Kootenay West and Okanagan—Kootenay ridings, and consisted of:

- the East Kootenay Regional District;
- the southeast part of the Central Kootenay Regional District; and
- the eastern part of the Columbia-Shuswap Regional District lying east of Electoral Areas C and E.

The name of the electoral district was changed in 1977 to "Kootenay East—Revelstoke". It was abolished in 1987 when it was redistributed into a new Kootenay East riding and Kootenay West—Revelstoke.

The new Kootenay East riding consisted of:

- the East Kootenay Regional District;
- Electoral Areas A, B and C of the Central Kootenay Regional District;
- the Town of Creston;
- Electoral Area A of the Columbia-Shuswap Regional District; and
- the town of Golden.

The electoral district was abolished in 1996 when it was redistributed into Kootenay—Columbia.

== Members of Parliament ==
Parliament	Years	Member	Party
Kootenay East; Riding created from Kootenay
13th	1917–1921	Saul Bonnell	Government (Unionist)
14th	1921–1922	Robert Ethelbert Beattie	Liberal
14th	1922–1925	James Horace King	Liberal
15th	1925–1926	James Horace King	Liberal
16th	1926–1926	James Horace King	Liberal
16th	1926–1930	James Horace King	Liberal
17th	1930–1930	Michael Dalton McLean	Conservative
17th	1930–1935	Henry Herbert Stevens	Conservative
18th	1935–1938	Henry Herbert Stevens	Reconstruction
18th	1938–1940	Henry Herbert Stevens	Conservative
19th	1940–1945	George MacKinnon	National Government
20th	1945–1949	James Herbert Matthews	Co-operative Commonwealth
21st	1949–1953	James Allen Byrne	Liberal
22nd	1953–1957	James Allen Byrne	Liberal
23rd	1957–1958	James Allen Byrne	Liberal
24th	1958–1962	Murray McFarlane	Progressive Conservative
25th	1962–1963	James Allen Byrne	Liberal
26th	1963–1965	James Allen Byrne	Liberal
27th	1965–1968	James Allen Byrne	Liberal
Riding dissolved into Kootenay West and Okanagan—Kootenay
Kootenay East—Revelstoke; Riding re-created from Kootenay West and Okanagan—Kootenay
31st	1979–1980	Stan Graham	Progressive Conservative
32nd	1980–1984	Sid Parker	New Democratic
33rd	1984–1988	Stan Graham	Progressive Conservative
Kootenay East
34th	1988–1993	Sid Parker	New Democratic
35th	1993–1997	Jim Abbott	Reform
Riding dissolved into Kootenay—Columbia

== Election results ==
=== Kootenay East, 1988–1997 ===
1993 Canadian federal election
Party	Candidate	Votes	%	±%
Reform	Jim Abbott	17,050	48.42	+44.37
Liberal	Jim S. Wavrecan	7,915	22.48	+10.42
New Democratic	Sid Parker	5,107	14.50	–28.71
Progressive Conservative	Jake McInnis	3,840	10.91	–27.61
National	Hilda Bechler	582	1.65	–
Green	Rhonda Smith	293	0.83	–
Christian Heritage	Gerald Lionel Brinders	194	0.55	–1.60
Natural Law	Ruth Anne Taves	158	0.45	–
Canada Party	Lelannd Haver	71	0.20	–
Total valid votes		35,210	99.55	
Total rejected ballots		159	0.45	+0.14
Turnout		35,369	70.33	–9.63
Eligible voters		50,292		
Reform gain from New Democratic		Swing		–
Source: Elections Canada

1988 Canadian federal election
Party	Candidate	Votes	%	±%
New Democratic	Sid Parker	14,904	43.22	+11.77
Progressive Conservative	Stan Graham	13,284	38.52	–7.97
Liberal	Bob Wilson-Smith	4,159	12.06	+0.58
Reform	Minnie Pearl Wilder	1,398	4.05	–
Christian Heritage	Gerald Lionel Brinders	742	2.15	–
Total valid votes		34,487	99.69	
Total rejected ballots		108	0.31	–0.39
Turnout		34,595	79.96	+1.09
Eligible voters		43,267		
New Democratic gain from Progressive Conservative		Swing		+9.87
Source: Elections Canada

=== Kootenay East—Revelstoke, 1979–1988 ===
1984 Canadian federal election: Kootenay East—Revelstoke
Party	Candidate	Votes	%	±%
Progressive Conservative	Stan Graham	18,129	46.49	+8.51
New Democratic	Sid Parker	15,908	40.80	+0.92
Liberal	Richard Fonger	4,477	11.48	–10.66
Independent	David R. Gildea	479	1.23	–
Total valid votes		38,993	99.71	
Total rejected ballots		115	0.29	+0.02
Turnout		39,108	77.99	+6.30
Eligible voters		50,142		
Progressive Conservative gain from New Democratic		Swing		+3.79
Source: Elections Canada

1980 Canadian federal election: Kootenay East—Revelstoke
Party	Candidate	Votes	%	±%
New Democratic	Sid Parker	13,299	39.87	+4.80
Progressive Conservative	Stan Graham	12,668	37.98	–2.76
Liberal	Joe Conroy	7,386	22.14	–2.04
Total valid votes		33,353	99.72	
Total rejected ballots		93	0.28	+0.10
Turnout		33,446	71.69	+0.23
Eligible voters		46,651		
New Democratic gain from Progressive Conservative		Swing		+3.78
Source: Elections Canada

1979 Canadian federal election: Kootenay East—Revelstoke
Party	Candidate	Votes	%	±%
Progressive Conservative	Stan Graham	12,904	40.75	–
New Democratic	Sid Parker	11,107	35.07	–
Liberal	Joe Conroy	7,658	24.18	–
Total valid votes		31,669	99.83	
Total rejected ballots		55	0.17	–
Turnout		31,724	71.47	–
Eligible voters		44,389		
Progressive Conservative hold		Swing		–
This riding was re-created from parts of Kootenay West and Okanagan—Kootenay, both of which elected Progressive Conservative candidates in the previous election.
Source: Elections Canada

=== Kootenay East, 1917–1968 ===
1965 Canadian federal election
Party	Candidate	Votes	%	±%
Liberal	James Allen Byrne	5,574	31.67	–1.95
New Democratic	James Patterson	4,825	27.42	–2.01
Social Credit	James E. Kennelly	4,370	24.83	+9.56
Progressive Conservative	Murray McFarlane	2,830	16.08	–5.61
Total valid votes		17,599	99.30	
Total rejected ballots		124	0.70	+0.15
Turnout		17,723	78.86	–4.33
Eligible voters		22,473		
Liberal hold		Swing		+0.02
Source: Library of Parliament

1963 Canadian federal election
Party	Candidate	Votes	%	±%
Liberal	James Allen Byrne	6,165	33.62	+2.03
New Democratic	William B. Mundy	5,395	29.42	+2.72
Progressive Conservative	Murray McFarlane	3,977	21.69	–4.42
Social Credit	Allan Wood Hunter	2,800	15.27	–0.33
Total valid votes		18,337	99.45	
Total rejected ballots		101	0.55	–0.39
Turnout		18,438	83.19	+1.87
Eligible voters		22,164		
Liberal hold		Swing		–0.34
Source: Library of Parliament

1962 Canadian federal election
Party	Candidate	Votes	%	±%
Liberal	James Allen Byrne	5,414	31.59	+3.62
New Democratic	William B. Mundy	4,576	26.70	+1.70
Progressive Conservative	Murray McFarlane	4,475	26.11	–7.35
Social Credit	Douglas Sadler	2,673	15.60	+2.03
Total valid votes		17,138	99.06	
Total rejected ballots		162	0.94	+0.09
Turnout		17,300	81.32	–3.06
Eligible voters		21,273		
Liberal gain from Progressive Conservative		Swing		+0.96
Source: Library of Parliament

1958 Canadian federal election
Party	Candidate	Votes	%	±%
Progressive Conservative	Murray McFarlane	5,363	33.46	+19.45
Liberal	James Allen Byrne	4,483	27.97	–3.46
Co-operative Commonwealth	David E. Bjerstedt	4,006	25.00	–2.08
Social Credit	James Chabot	2,174	13.57	–13.91
Total valid votes		16,026	99.16	
Total rejected ballots		136	0.84	+0.21
Turnout		16,162	84.38	+5.72
Eligible voters		19,154		
Progressive Conservative gain from Liberal		Swing		+11.46
Source: Library of Parliament

1957 Canadian federal election
Party	Candidate	Votes	%	±%
Liberal	James Allen Byrne	4,670	31.44	–6.65
Social Credit	James Chabot	4,082	27.48	–2.10
Co-operative Commonwealth	Howard William Day	4,022	27.07	–0.96
Progressive Conservative	Murray McFarlane	2,082	14.01	–
Total valid votes		14,856	99.36	
Total rejected ballots		95	0.64	–1.11
Turnout		14,951	78.66	+7.29
Eligible voters		19,007		
Liberal hold		Swing		–2.28
Source: Library of Parliament

1953 Canadian federal election
Party	Candidate	Votes	%	±%
Liberal	James Allen Byrne	4,988	38.09	–2.40
Social Credit	Lorne George McLean	3,874	29.58	–
Co-operative Commonwealth	Donald C. MacDonald	3,672	28.04	–11.74
Labor–Progressive	Samuel English	563	4.30	–
Total valid votes		13,097	98.26	
Total rejected ballots		232	1.74	+0.84
Turnout		13,329	71.37	–6.10
Eligible voters		18,675		
Liberal hold		Swing		–15.99
Source: Library of Parliament

1949 Canadian federal election
Party	Candidate	Votes	%	±%
Liberal	James Allen Byrne	5,546	40.49	+15.55
Co-operative Commonwealth	James Herbert Matthews	5,448	39.77	+2.92
Progressive Conservative	Albert Tindale Richardson	2,704	19.74	–0.91
Total valid votes		13,698	99.10	
Total rejected ballots		124	0.90	–0.22
Turnout		13,822	77.47	–14.95
Eligible voters		17,842		
Liberal gain from Co-operative Commonwealth		Swing		+6.32
Source: Library of Parliament

1945 Canadian federal election
Party	Candidate	Votes	%	±%
Co-operative Commonwealth	James Herbert Matthews	4,712	36.85	+3.43
Liberal	John Joseph O'Neill	3,189	24.94	–6.67
Progressive Conservative	Donald Kent Archibald	2,640	20.65	–14.31
Labor–Progressive	Harvey Murphy	1,632	12.76	–
Social Credit	Joseph Arthur Horne	613	4.79	–
Total valid votes		12,786	98.89	
Total rejected ballots		144	1.11	+0.31
Turnout		12,930	92.42	+3.87
Eligible voters		13,991		
Co-operative Commonwealth gain from National Government		Swing		+5.04
Source: Library of Parliament

1940 Canadian federal election
Party	Candidate	Votes	%	±%
National Government	George MacKinnon	4,395	34.96	–
Co-operative Commonwealth	James Herbert Matthews	4,202	33.43	+17.99
Liberal	Edwin K. Stewart	3,974	31.61	–1.59
Total valid votes		12,571	99.20	
Total rejected ballots		102	0.80	–0.35
Turnout		12,673	88.55	+8.48
Eligible voters		14,312		
National Government gain from Reconstruction		Swing		+8.48
Source: Library of Parliament

1935 Canadian federal election
Party	Candidate	Votes	%	±%
Reconstruction	Henry Herbert Stevens	3,904	38.81	–
Liberal	Robert Randolph Bruce	3,339	33.20	–15.67
Co-operative Commonwealth	Bayard Ormand Iverson	1,553	15.44	–
Social Credit	Ernest William Sjodin	1,262	12.55	–
Total valid votes		10,058	98.85	
Total rejected ballots		117	1.15	–
Turnout		10,175	80.07	–
Eligible voters		12,708		
Reconstruction gain from Conservative		Swing		+27.24
Source: Library of Parliament

Canadian federal by-election, 25 August 1930 On Michael McLean's acceptance of an office of emolument under the Crown, 7 August 1930
Party	Candidate	Votes
Conservative	Henry Herbert Stevens	acclaimed
Source: Library of Parliament

1930 Canadian federal election
Party	Candidate	Votes	%	±%
Conservative	Michael Dalton McLean	4,674	51.13	+11.53
Liberal	Joseph-Francis Guimont	4,468	48.87	+5.94
Total valid votes		9,142	100.00	
Total rejected ballots		–		
Turnout		9,142	84.38	–
Eligible voters		10,834		
Conservative gain from Liberal		Swing		+2.80
Source: Library of Parliament

Canadian federal by-election, 9 November 1926 On James King's acceptance of an office of emolument under the Crown, 11 October 1926
Party	Candidate	Votes
Liberal	James Horace King	acclaimed
Source: Library of Parliament

1926 Canadian federal election
Party	Candidate	Votes	%	±%
Liberal	James Horace King	3,547	42.93	–13.06
Conservative	John Wesley Rutledge	3,272	39.60	–4.41
Labour	James Sims	1,444	17.48	–
Total valid votes		8,263	100.00	
Total rejected ballots		–		
Turnout		8,263	80.76	–0.02
Eligible voters		10,232		
Liberal hold		Swing		–4.32
Source: Library of Parliament

1925 Canadian federal election
Party	Candidate	Votes	%	±%
Liberal	James Horace King	4,446	55.99	–6.40
Conservative	John Wesley Rutledge	3,495	44.01	–
Total valid votes		7,941	100.00	
Total rejected ballots		–		
Turnout		7,941	80.78	–
Eligible voters		9,831		
Liberal hold		Swing		–25.20
Source: Library of Parliament

Canadian federal by-election, 14 March 1922 On Robert Beattie's acceptance of an office of emolument under the Crown, 8 February 1922
Party	Candidate	Votes	%	±%
Liberal	James Horace King	3,223	62.39	+24.25
Unknown	Thomas Harold Bronsdon	1,943	37.61	–
Total valid votes		5,166	100.00	
Total rejected ballots		–		
Turnout		5,166	–	–
Eligible voters				
Liberal hold		Swing		–6.68
Source: Library of Parliament

1921 Canadian federal election
Party	Candidate	Votes	%	±%
Liberal	Robert Ethelbert Beattie	2,339	38.14	+9.35
Conservative	Saul Bonnell	2,203	35.92	–27.23
Progressive	William Scott Macdonald	1,591	25.94	–
Total valid votes		6,133	100.00	
Total rejected ballots		–		
Turnout		6,133	80.59	–24.90
Eligible voters		7,610		
Liberal gain from Government (Unionist)		Swing		+18.29
Source: Library of Parliament

1917 Canadian federal election
Party	Candidate	Votes	%	±%
Government (Unionist)	Saul Bonnell	3,398	63.15	–
Opposition	Robert Ethelbert Beattie	1,549	28.79	–
Labour	Thomas Biggs	434	8.07	–
Total valid votes		5,381	100.00	
Total rejected ballots		–		
Turnout		5,381	105.49	–
Eligible voters		5,101		
This riding was created from parts of Kootenay, which elected a Conservative candidate in the previous election.
Source: Library of Parliament

== See also ==
- List of Canadian electoral districts
- Historical federal electoral districts of Canada
