= Thomas Donald Caven =

Thomas D. Caven
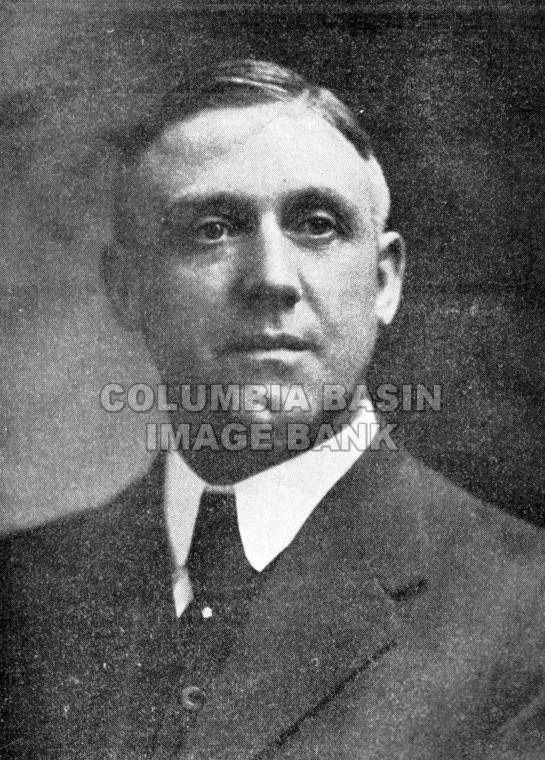

MLA for Cranbrook
- In office 1909–1916
- Preceded by: James Horace King
- Succeeded by: James Horace King

Personal details
- Born: May 21, 1871 Picton, Ontario
- Died: February 20, 1926 (aged 54) Vancouver, British Columbia
- Party: Conservative
- Spouse(s): Elizabeth Dickerson (m. 3 Nov 1906)
- Occupation: railroad employee

Thomas Donald Caven (May 21, 1871 – February 20, 1926) was a Canadian politician and railway employee. He was a member of the Legislative Assembly of British Columbia from 1909 to 1916, representing Cranbrook.

Caven was born in 1871 in Ontario to John Caven and Adelia Bougard. He came to Cranbrook around 1898 upon the completion of the Crowsnest Pass line of the Canadian Pacific Railway.

Caven was an employee of the Canadian Pacific Railway, a longtime railway conductor. A 1903 article stated that his property interests were largely a part of his money earned as a railway employee, noting that he "[represented] the people that have made Cranbrook one of the flourishing and progressive towns of the province." In the 1903 British Columbia general election, he obtained the Conservative nomination for the provincial electoral district of Cranbrook, but he would ultimately lose out to Liberal James Horace King. After another defeat in 1907, Caven would eventually head to the Legislative Assembly of British Columbia, elected in 1909 and again, this time by acclamation in 1912. His term ended in 1916 when he was defeated again by James H. King. He attempted a return in 1920 as an Independent Conservative but he was defeated by King once again. He retired from the railway in 1923.

In November 1906, Caven married Elizabeth Dickerson of Emporium, Pennsylvania. He was an active member of the freemasons, taking part in the Cranbrook Masonic Lodge, Royal Arch Masons and Seklirk Preceptory. Thomas Caven died suddenly on February 20, 1926, at Vancouver. A newspaper report noted the "profound shock" that his death sent across the East Kootenay region, as it was not known that he was in ill health at the time.

== Electoral history ==
10th British Columbia election, 1903
Party	Candidate	Votes	%	±	Expenditures
Conservative	Thomas Donald Caven	435	46.52%		unknown
Liberal	James Horace King	500	53.48%		unknown
Total valid votes		935	100.00%		
Total rejected ballots					
Turnout		%			

12th British Columbia election, 1909
Party	Candidate	Votes	%	±	Expenditures
Conservative	Thomas Donald Caven	761	54.16%		unknown
Socialist	John William Fitch	143	10.18%	–	unknown
Liberal	Malcolm Archibald MacDonald	501	35.66%		unknown
Total valid votes		1,405	100.00%		
Total rejected ballots					
Turnout		%			

13th British Columbia election, 1912
Party	Candidate	Votes	%	±	Expenditures
Conservative	Thomas Donald Caven	Accl.	-.- %		unknown
Total valid votes		n/a	-.-%		
Total rejected ballots					
Turnout		%			

14th British Columbia election, 1916
Party	Candidate	Votes	%	±	Expenditures
Conservative	Thomas Donald Caven	504	40.94%		unknown
Liberal	James Horace King	727	59.06%		unknown
Total valid votes		1,231	100.00%		
Total rejected ballots					
Turnout		%			

15th British Columbia election, 1920
Party	Candidate	Votes	%	±	Expenditures
Independent Conservative	Thomas Donald Caven	905	49.02%		
Liberal	James Horace King	941	50.98%		
Total valid votes		1,846	100.00%		
