= Robert Ethelbert Beattie =

Canadian politician (1875–1925)

Member of the Canadian Parliament for Kootenay East
- In office 1921–1922
- Preceded by: Saul Bonnell
- Succeeded by: James Horace King

Personal details
- Born: March 20, 1875 Ontario, Canada
- Died: May 5, 1925 (aged 50)
- Party: Liberal
- Occupation: pharmacist

Robert Ethelbert Beattie (March 20, 1875 – May 5, 1925) was a Canadian politician and pharmacist. He was elected to the House of Commons of Canada as a Member of the Liberal Party in the 1921 election to represent the riding of Kootenay East and on February 9, 1922, he accepted an office of emolument under the Crown. He was defeated in the 1917 election as a Laurier Liberal.
