= Michael Dalton McLean =

Canadian politician

Member of Parliament for Kootenay East
- In office 28 July 1930 – 6 August 1930
- Preceded by: James Horace King
- Succeeded by: Henry Herbert Stevens

Personal details
- Born: Michael Dalton McLean; 2 December 1880 Reserve Mines, Nova Scotia
- Died: 12 August 1958 (aged 77) Michel, British Columbia
- Party: Conservative
- Profession: foreman

Michael Dalton McLean (2 December 1880 – 12 August 1958) was elected a Conservative member of the House of Commons of Canada. He was born in Nova Scotia and became a foreman.

McLean won the Kootenay East riding in the July 1930 general election, but resigned on 7 August 1930 to open the seat for Henry Herbert Stevens whom Prime Minister R. B. Bennett appointed Minister of Trade and Commerce. McLean accepted an unspecified federal appointment.
