= Henry Herbert Stevens =

Canadian politician

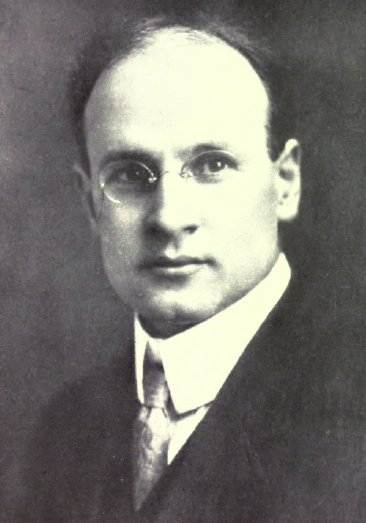

Member of the Canadian Parliament for Kootenay East
- In office 25 August 1930 – 25 March 1940
- Preceded by: Michael Dalton McLean
- Succeeded by: George MacKinnon

Member of the Canadian Parliament for Vancouver Centre
- In office 17 December 1917 – 27 July 1930
- Preceded by: riding created
- Succeeded by: Ian Alistair Mackenzie

Member of the Canadian Parliament for Vancouver City
- In office 21 September 1911 – 16 December 1917
- Preceded by: George Henry Cowan
- Succeeded by: riding abolished

Personal details
- Born: 8 December 1878 Bristol, England
- Died: 14 June 1973 (aged 94) Vancouver, British Columbia, Canada
- Party: Conservative
- Other political affiliations: Reconstruction Party (1935–1938)
- Cabinet: Minister of Trade and Commerce (1930–1934); Minister of Customs and Excise (1926); Minister of Agriculture (Acting) (1926); Minister of Customs and Excise (Acting) (1926); Minister of Mines (Acting) (1926); Minister of the Interior (Acting)(1926); Minister of Trade and Commerce (Acting) (1926); Superintendent-General of Indian Affairs (Acting) (1926) Minister of Trade and Commerce (1921)

Henry Herbert Stevens, PC (8 December 1878 – 14 June 1973) was a Canadian politician and businessman. A member of R. B. Bennett's cabinet, he split with the Conservative Prime Minister to found the Reconstruction Party of Canada.

== Early life ==
Stevens was born in Bristol, England and immigrated to Canada with his family at the age of nine. His family settled in Peterborough, Ontario where his widowed father raised him and his three brothers and sisters. The family moved to Vernon, British Columbia, in 1894 and Stevens found his first job there, as a grocery clerk, at the age of 16. He then went to northern British Columbia to work in the mining camps before working as a fireman on the Canadian Pacific Railway and later as a stagecoach driver. In 1899 he joined the United States Army, and travelled to the Philippines and then to China, where he was present during the Boxer Rebellion, before returning to British Columbia in 1901. He found work again in the grocery business and then as an accountant. Up to the time he entered politics, he was a lay preacher in his local Methodist Church and he occasionally took services in remote logging camps and schoolhouses outside Vancouver. He became active in politics after a high-profile anti-crime crusade. Vancouver was rife with opium dens, saloons and illegal gambling halls, and Stevens visited these places each night and then published the names of the establishments and what he had witnessed there in the press the next day. His campaign forced the resignation of the chief of police and won Stevens a seat on Vancouver City Council in 1910.

== Parliamentary career ==
Stevens was first elected to the House of Commons in the general election of 1911 as a Conservative. He served in the short-lived Cabinets of Prime Minister Arthur Meighen in 1921 as Minister of Trade and Commerce, until the government was defeated by William Lyon Mackenzie King's Liberals. In 1926 Stevens led an investigation into the King government's handling of customs, which uncovered evidence of corruption that forced the resignation of King's minority government. This was followed by Governor General Byng's controversial decision to ask the Conservatives under Meighen to form a government rather than call an election. Stevens was appointed Minister of Customs and Excise in Meighen's short-lived ministry.

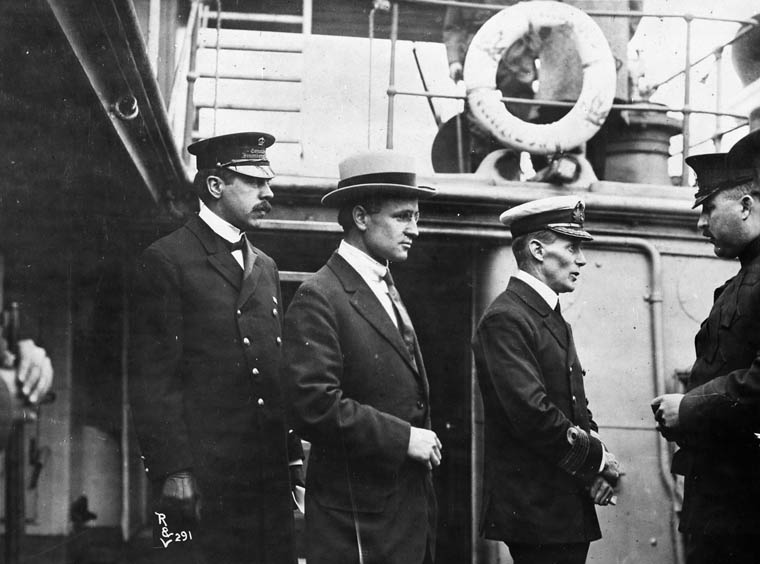
Reid, Stevens and Walter Hose on board the Komagata Maru

Stevens was an opponent of Asian immigration saying, in 1914, "We cannot hope to preserve the national type if we allow Asiatics to enter Canada in any numbers." He was actively involved in the Komagata Maru incident, working with the head immigration officer, Malcolm R. J. Reid, to stop the ship's Indian passengers from coming to shore. It was Reid's fortitude, supported by Stevens, that led to the ultimate departure of the ship, which status was not resolved until after the intervention of the federal Minister of Agriculture, Martin Burrell, MP for Yale—Cariboo.

After R.B. Bennett led the Tories to victory in the general election of 1930 he made Stevens his Minister of Trade and Commerce. In 1934 Stevens chaired the Royal Commission on Price Spreads and Mass Buying, through which he exposed abuses by big business, attacked corporate interests, accusing them of price fixing, and called for radical reform. Bennett agreed to set up a parliamentary committee in February 1934 to examine price fixing and corporate manipulation of the market. Stevens resigned from Cabinet a year later when many of the committee's recommendations were ignored. Three cabinet ministers urged Stevens to challenge Bennett for the leadership of the party within the Conservative caucus and a total of 72 of the 137 Conservative MPs pledged to support Stevens, but he declined to challenge Bennett for the party leadership without a leadership convention.

Instead, Stevens quit the Conservatives to form the Reconstruction Party of Canada. In the federal elections of 1935 the party won nearly 400,000 votes and shattered the Tories, reducing them to a rump of only 30 seats, but Stevens was the only Reconstructionist candidate to win a seat. He subsequently crossed the floor to rejoin the Conservative Party in 1938 and was rumoured to be considering standing for party leader at the 1938 Conservative leadership convention but did not run. He ran as a Conservative candidate in Kamloops in 1940, but was defeated.

== Later life ==
Stevens ran as a candidate in the 1942 Conservative leadership convention, but was eliminated on the first ballot, losing to John Bracken. He did not run in the general election of 1945, but ran again in Vancouver Centre in 1949 and again in 1953, losing both times. He was elected Chairman of the Vancouver Board of Trade in 1952. He was a member of the Orange Order.

In 1942, Stevens was elected President of the B.C. Natural Resources Conservation League.

Stevens was the last surviving member of Bennett's cabinet when he died in 1973 at the age of 94.

== Archives ==
There are Henry Herbert Stevens fonds at Library and Archives Canada and Trent University.

== See also ==
- William Duncan Herridge
