= James Herbert Matthews =

Canadian politician

Herbert James Mathews
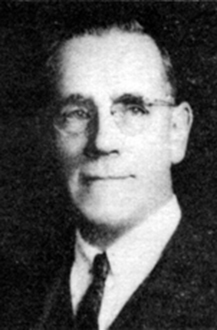

Member of Parliament for Kootenay East
- In office June 1945 – June 1949
- Preceded by: George E. L. Mackinnon
- Succeeded by: James Allen Byrne

Personal details
- Born: Herbert James Mathews; 28 February 1883 Spondon, Derbyshire, England
- Died: 3 September 1972 (aged 89) Chesterfield, Derbyshire, England
- Party: Co-operative Commonwealth Federation
- Profession: Christian minister

Herbert James Matthews (28 February 1883 – 3 September 1972) was a Co-operative Commonwealth Federation member of the House of Commons of Canada. He was born in Spondon, Derbyshire, England, and became a Christian minister by career.

He was first elected to Parliament at the Kootenay East riding in the 1945 general election after an unsuccessful attempt there in 1940. He was defeated in the 1949 election by James Allen Byrne of the Liberal party.
