= Sid Parker =

Canadian politician (born 1930)

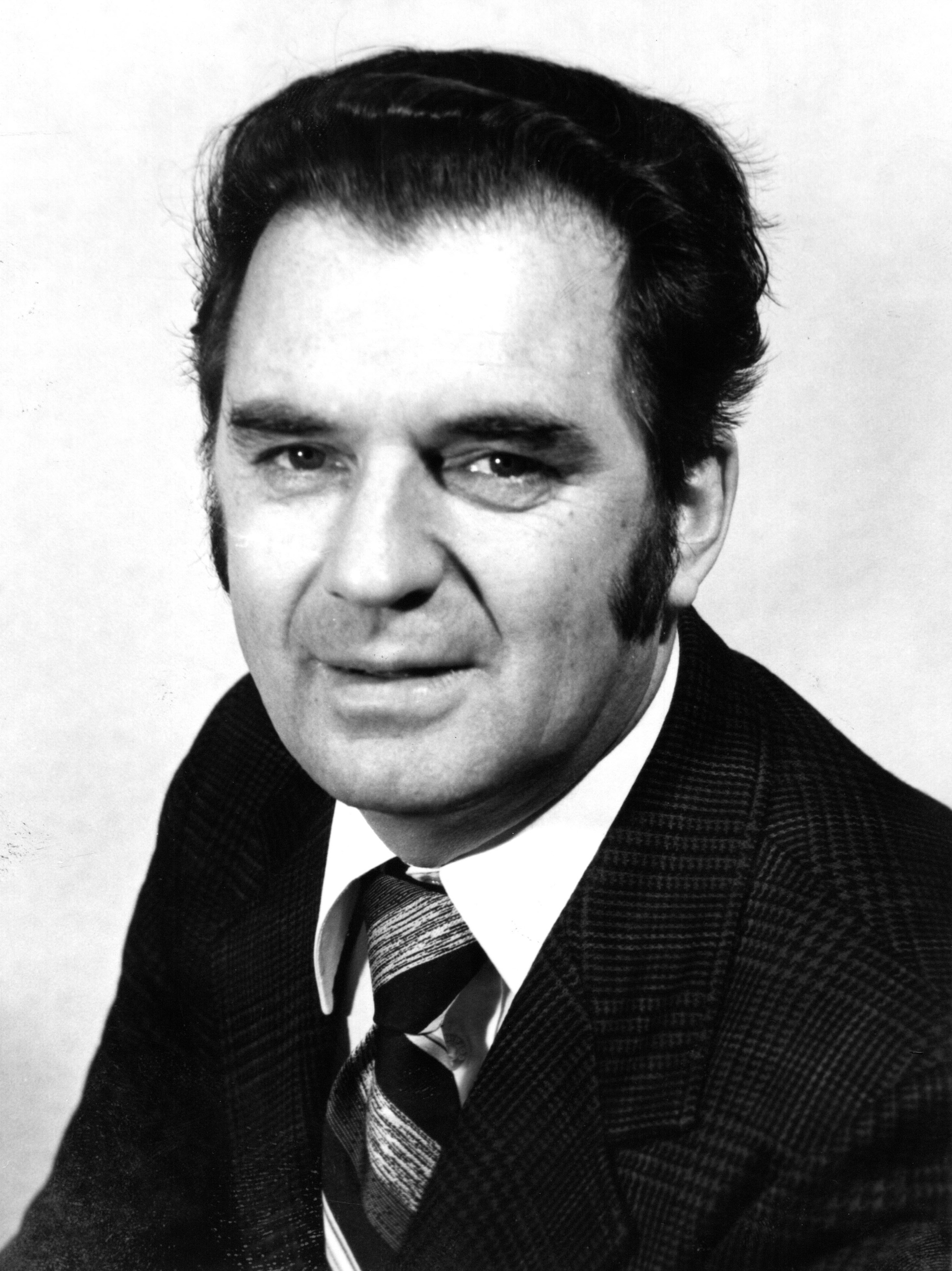

Member of Parliament for Kootenay East—Revelstoke
- In office 1980–1984
- Preceded by: Stan Graham
- Succeeded by: Stan Graham
- In office 1988–1993
- Preceded by: Stan Graham
- Succeeded by: Jim Abbott

Mayor of Revelstoke
- In office 1970–1978

Personal details
- Born: 15 September 1930 (age 95) Revelstoke, British Columbia, Canada
- Party: New Democratic Party
- Profession: Train conductor

Sidney James Parker (born 15 September 1930) is a former New Democratic Party member of the House of Commons of Canada. Before his political career, he was a train conductor.

Parker was mayor of Revelstoke from 1970 to 1978.

He represented the British Columbia riding of Kootenay East, which in some elections was known as Kootenay East—Revelstoke. His first campaign against Stan Graham of the Progressive Conservative party in the 1979 federal election was unsuccessful. Parker won alternate terms in Parliament against Graham, first gaining the seat in 1980 election, losing in 1984, then returning to Parliament in the 1988 election.

Parker was defeated in the 1993 election by Jim Abbott of the Reform party. Stan Graham was not a competing candidate on this occasion. Parker left national politics after serving in the 32nd and 34th Canadian Parliaments.
