= 1935 Canadian federal election =

- October 14, 1935

245 seats in the House of Commons 123 seats needed for a majority
- Turnout: 74.2% (▲0.7 pp)
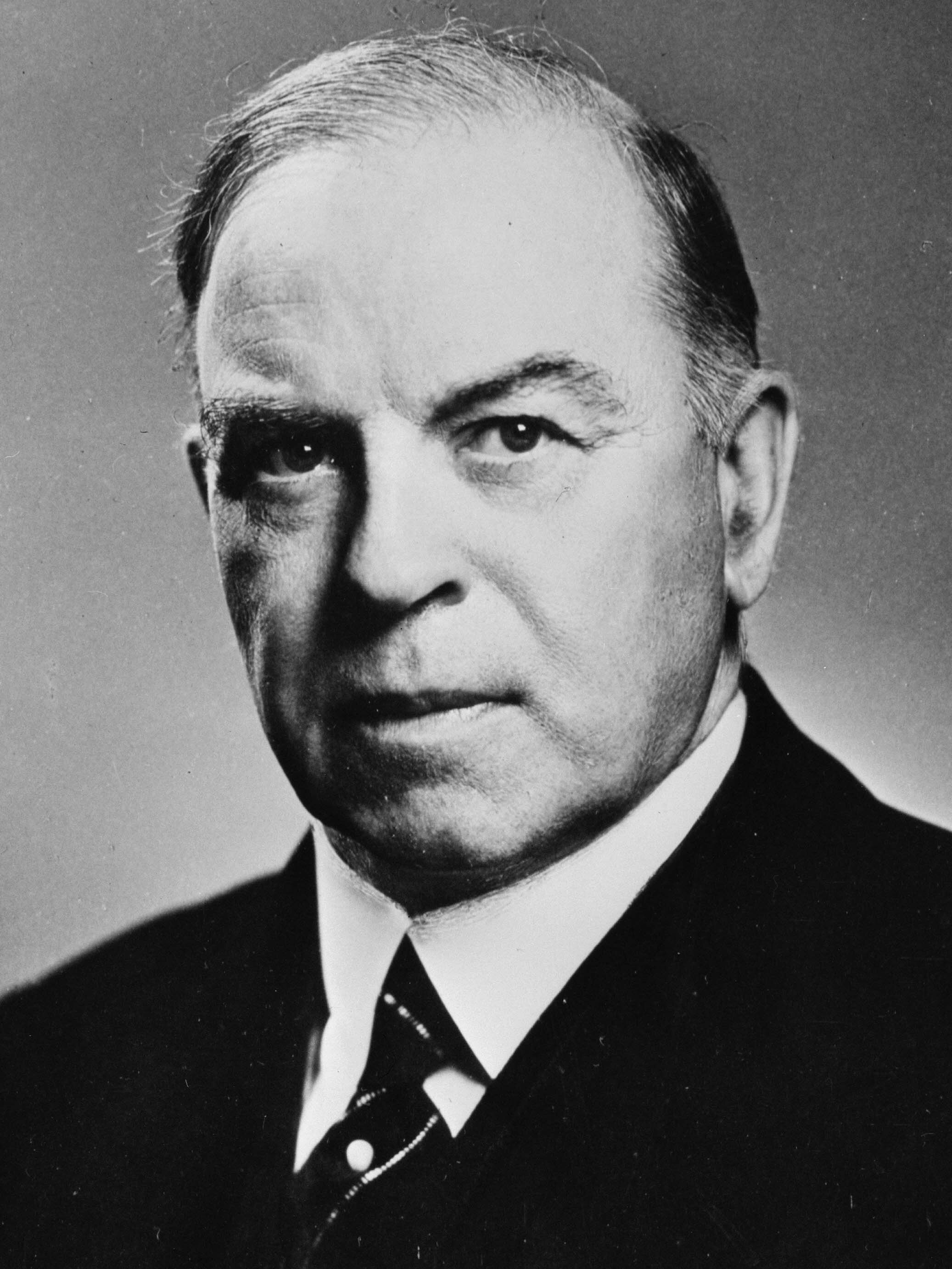

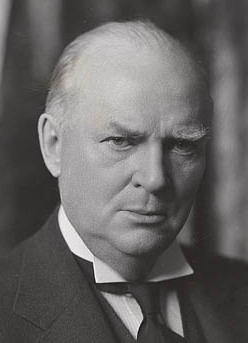

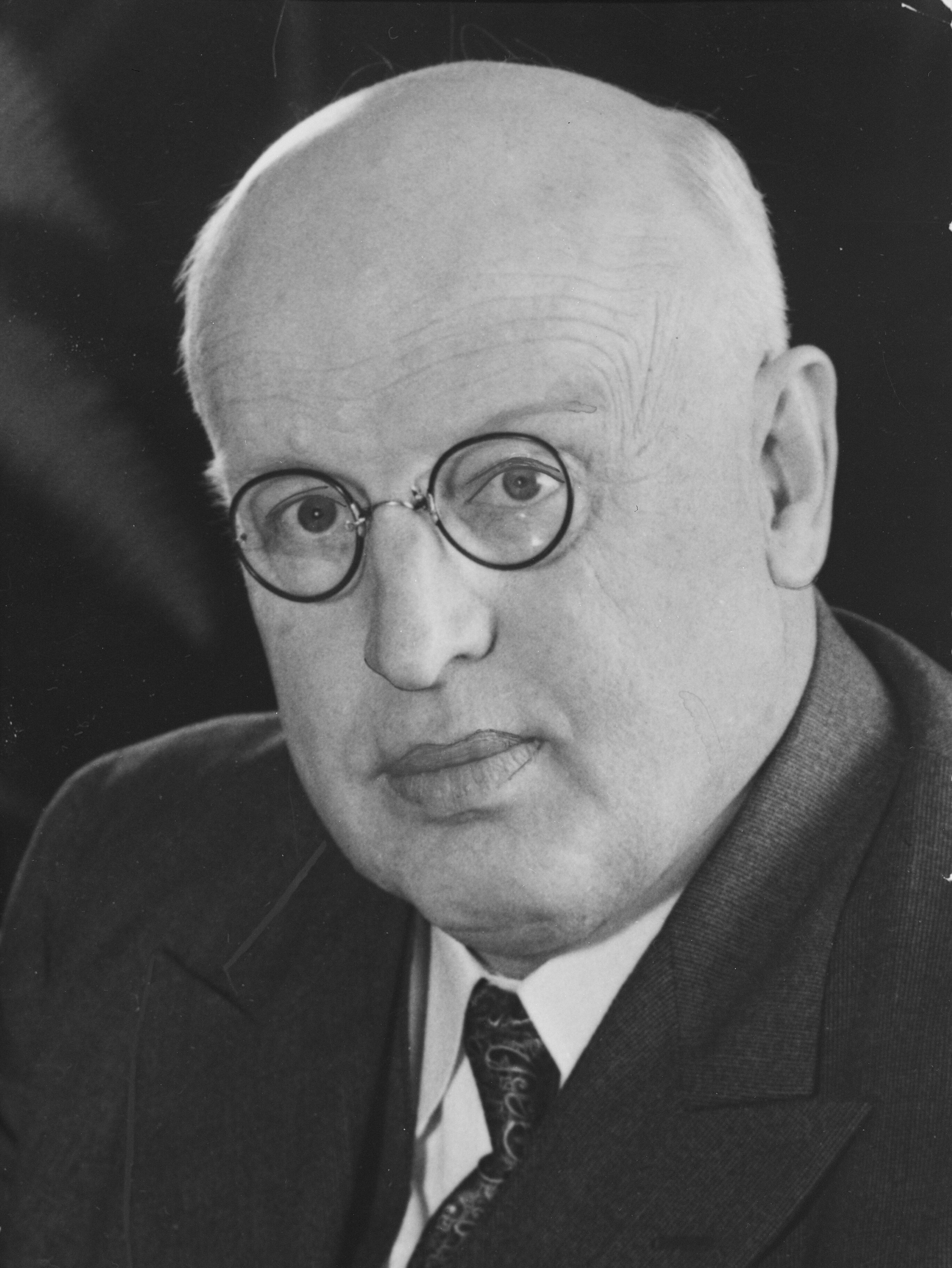

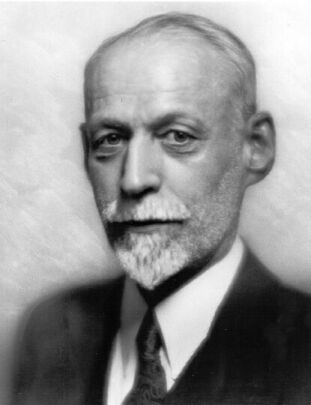

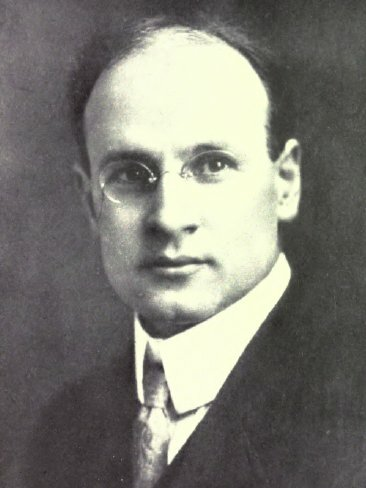
	First party	Second party	Third party
Leader	W. L. Mackenzie King	R. B. Bennett	William Aberhart (unofficial)
Party	Liberal	Conservative	Social Credit
Leader since	August 7, 1919	October 12, 1927	October 14, 1935
Leader's seat	Prince Albert	Calgary West	Did not run (Note: Aberhart was Premier of Alberta, and represented the provincial seat of Okotoks-High River, but was not a candidate in the federal election. John Horne Blackmore acted as Social Credit's parliamentary leader afterwards.)
Last election	89 seats, 44.03%	137 seats, 47.79%	New party
Seats won	173	39	17
Seat change	▲84	▼98	▲17
Popular vote	1,967,839	1,290,671	180,679
Percentage	44.68%	29.84%	4.10%
Swing	▲0.65 pp	▼18.48 pp	New party
	Fourth party	Fifth party
Leader	J. S. Woodsworth	H. H. Stevens
Party	Co-operative Commonwealth	Reconstruction
Leader since	August 1, 1932	July 7, 1935
Leader's seat	Winnipeg North Centre	Kootenay East
Last election	New party	New party
Seats won	7	1
Seat change	▲7	▲1
Popular vote	410,125	384,462
Percentage	9.31%	8.73%
Swing	New party	New party

- The Canadian parliament after the 1935 election
Prime Minister before election
R. B. Bennett
Conservative
Prime Minister after election
William Lyon Mackenzie King
Liberal

The 1935 Canadian federal election was held on October 14, 1935, to elect members of the House of Commons of Canada of the 18th Parliament of Canada. The Liberal Party of William Lyon Mackenzie King won a majority government, defeating Prime Minister R. B. Bennett's Conservatives.

The central issue was the economy, which was still in the depths of the Great Depression. In office since the 1930 election, Bennett had sought to stimulate the economy during his first few years through a policy of high tariffs and trade within the British Empire. In the last months of his time in office, he reversed his position, copying the popular New Deal of Franklin Roosevelt in the United States. Upset about high unemployment and inaction by the federal government, voters were unwilling to allow the Conservatives to continue to govern, despite their change of policy.

The Conservatives were also suffering severe internal divisions. During his first years in office, Bennett had alienated those in his party who supported intervention in the economy. His last minute conversion to interventionism alienated the rest of the party. Former cabinet minister H.H. Stevens left to form the Reconstruction Party. Senior minister Sir Joseph Flavelle announced he would be supporting the Liberals.

Support for Bennett's Tories dropped by a third and 20 percentage points. And their drop in seats was worse. Conservatives took just 39 seats, which was the party's smallest ever seat count until their collapse in 1993.

Mackenzie King promised mild reforms to restore economic health. The Liberals received a small increase in votes compared to 1930 but took many more seats this time, taking 173 seats to the Conservatives' 39. The Liberal Party would continue to hold power until 1957.

The 1935 election was also important in that it saw the final demise of the Progressive Party and the United Farmers of Alberta. The Progressive Party, having been in decline over the previous decade, did not run any candidates under its own banner. The federal party, always highly decentralized, ceased to exist sometime circa 1940. However, Liberal-Progressive Premier of Manitoba John Bracken brought the name back into formal use when he moved to federal politics and the Conservative Party in 1942, winning the leadership 1942 Progressive Conservative leadership convention. His first act as Conservative Party leader was to rechristen them the Progressive Conservative Party.

The United Farmers of Alberta, whose credibility was ruined by a sex scandal involving premier John E. Brownlee, had lost all their seats in the provincial election earlier that year due to the popularity of the Social Credit. The UFA had signed on to the Co-operative Commonwealth Federation party, founded in 1932, and again suffering under shadow of the Social Credit wave, elected no MPs in this federal election. The eight sitting MPs such as Michael Luchkovich were no more successful than new faces in this regard.

Two new movements rose out of the west, however. The new Co-operative Commonwealth Federation, a social democratic party, first competed in this election and won seven seats (including Tommy Douglas' first stint in elective office), promising social reform. The Social Credit Party of Canada was even more successful, capturing seventeen seats on its platform of monetary reform despite winning less of the popular vote than the former. Fifteen of these seats were in Alberta, where the party dominated after having swept to power in a landslide less than two months before the federal vote. John Horne Blackmore was chosen to lead the Social Credit caucus after the election. The de facto leader of the national movement was Alberta Premier William Aberhart, who did not stand in the federal election himself.

== National results ==

Party	Party leader	# of candidates	Seats			Popular vote		
Party	Party leader	# of candidates	1930	Elected	% Change	#	%	pp Change
Liberal	W. L. Mackenzie King	245	90	173	+92.2%	1,967,839	44.68%	+0.65
Conservative	R. B. Bennett	228	134	39	-70.9%	1,290,671	29.30%	-18.48
Social Credit		46	*	17	*	180,679	4.10%	*
Co-operative Commonwealth	J. S. Woodsworth	121	*	7	*	410,125	9.31%	*
Liberal–Progressive		5	3	4	+33.3%	29,569	0.67%	-0.48
Reconstruction	H.H. Stevens	172	*	1	*	384,462	8.73%	*
Independent Liberal		24	-	1		54,239	1.23%	+0.86
Independent		14	2	1	-50.0%	17,897	0.40%	-0.15
United Farmers of Ontario-Labour		1	-	1		7,210	0.16%	+0.16
Independent Conservative		4	-	1		1,078	0.02%	-0.24
Communist	Tim Buck	12	-	-	-	20,140	0.46%	+0.34
Labour		5	2	-	-100%	14,423	0.33%	-0.35
Progressive-Conservative		2	1	-	-100%	12,220	0.28%	-0.13
Verdun		1	*	-	*	4,214	0.10%	*
Anti-Communist		1	*	-	*	3,961	0.09%	*
Unknown		2	-	-	-	2,717	0.08%	-0.11
Independent Reconstructionist		1	*	0	*	865	0.02%	*
Technocrat		1	*	0	*	733	0.02%	*
Liberal-Labour		3	-	-	-	708	0.02%	-0.17
Socialist Party of Canada (WSM)		1	*	-	*	251	0.01%	*
Independent Labour		1	-	-	-	221	0.01%	-0.41
Veteran		1	*	-	*	79	x	*
Total		891	245	245	-	4,404,301	100%	
Sources: http://www.elections.ca -- History of Federal Ridings since 1867

Notes:

* The party did not nominate candidates in the previous election.

x - less than 0.005% of the popular vote

== Vote and seat summaries ==
Ternary plots - shift of electoral support (1930-1935)
1930

1935
Electoral districts identified by colours of winning parties

Popular vote
Liberal	44.68%
Conservative	29.84%
CCF	9.31%
Reconstruction	8.73%
Social Credit	4.10%
Others	3.88%

Seat totals
Liberal	70.61%
Conservative	15.91%
Social Credit	6.93%
CCF	2.85%
Reconstruction	0.40%
Others	3.26%

== Results by province ==
Party name		BC	AB	SK	MB	ON	QC	NB	NS	PE	YK	Total
Liberal	Seats won by party:	6	1	16	10	56	59	9	12	4	-	173
Liberal	Popular Vote (%):	31.8	21.6	40.8	31.7	42.2	56.0	57.2	52.7	58.3	44.4	44.7
Conservative	Seats:	5	1	1	1	25	5	1	-	-		39
Conservative	Vote:	24.9	17.6	18.0	27.9	35.8	27.5	31.9	34.5	38.4		29.8
Co-operative Commonwealth (including United Farmers candidates in Alberta)	Seats:	3	-	2	2	-	-					7
Co-operative Commonwealth (including United Farmers candidates in Alberta)	Vote:	32.7	12.0	21.3	19.4	8.0	0.6					8.8
Social Credit	Seats:	-	15	2	-							17
Social Credit	Vote:	0.6	46.6	17.8	2.0							4.1
Liberal-Progressive	Seats:				4							4
Liberal-Progressive	Vote:				10.5							0.7
Reconstruction	Seats:	1	-	-	-	-	-	-	-	-		1
Reconstruction	Vote:	7.3	0.7	1.3	5.9	11.4	9.3	9.7	12.7	3.4		8.7
Independent Liberal	Seats:				-	-	1	-	-			1
Independent Liberal	Vote:				0.2	0.6	3.8	0.4	3			1.2
Independent	Seats:	1			-	-	-	-				1
Independent	Vote:	1.8			0.1	0.2	0.7	0.8				0.4
UFO-Labour	Seats:					1						1
UFO-Labour	Vote:					0.5						0.2
Independent Conservative	Seats:						-				1	1
Independent Conservative	Vote:						xx				55.6	xx
Total Seats		16	17	21	17	82	65	10	12	4	1	245
Parties that won no seats:
Communist	Vote:	0.5	1.1	0.8	0.7	0.5	0.3					0.5
Farmer-Labour	Vote:	0.3				0.5	0.5					0.3
Progressive-Conservative	Vote:				0.5		0.7					0.1
Verdun	Vote:						0.4					0.1
Anti-Communist	Vote:					0.2						0.1
Unknown	Vote:					0.x	0.x					0.1
Independent Reconstruction	Vote:						0.1					xx
Technocrat	Vote:		0.3									xx
Liberal-Labour	Vote:						0.1					xx
Socialist	Vote:	0.1										xx
Independent Labour	Vote:						0.x					xx
Veteran	Vote:						0.x					xx

- xx - less than 0.05% of the popular vote

== See also ==
- List of Canadian federal general elections
- List of political parties in Canada
- 18th Canadian Parliament
