= James Horace King =

Canadian politician (1873–1955)

The Honourable James Horace King PC
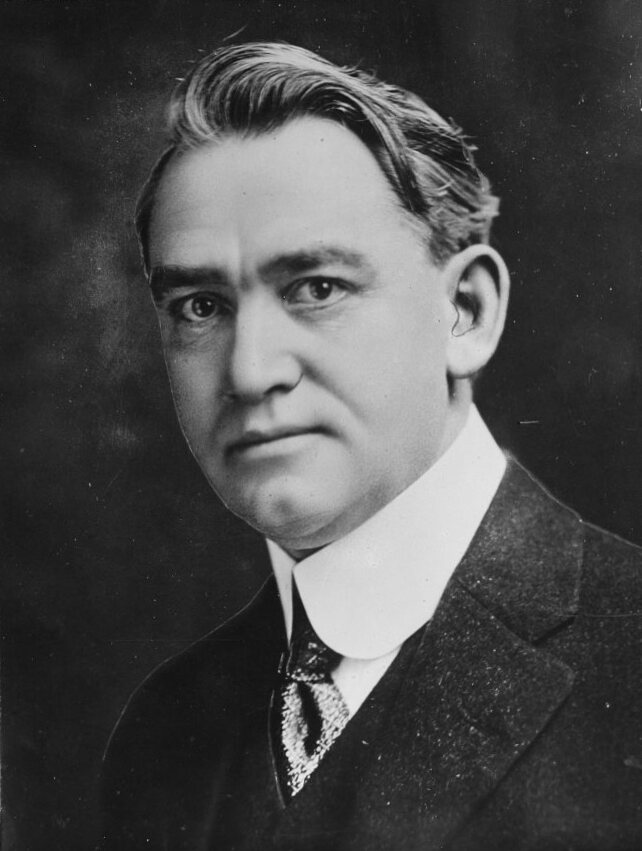
- King, c. 1925

Member of the British Columbia Legislative Assembly for Cranbrook
- In office 1903–1909
- Succeeded by: Thomas Donald Caven
- In office 1916–1922
- Preceded by: Thomas Donald Caven
- Succeeded by: Noel Wallinger

Member of Parliament for Kootenay East
- In office 1922–1930
- Preceded by: Robert Ethelbert Beattie
- Succeeded by: Michael Dalton McLean

Canadian Senator from British Columbia
- In office June 7, 1930 – July 14, 1955

Personal details
- Born: January 18, 1873 Chipman, New Brunswick, Canada
- Died: July 14, 1955 (aged 82) Ottawa, Ontario, Canada
- Party: Liberal
- Education: McGill University (MD)
- Profession: Physician

James Horace King, PC (January 18, 1873 – July 14, 1955) was a Canadian physician and parliamentarian.

== Background ==
Born in Chipman, New Brunswick, James King was the son of George Gerald King, a businessman and Canadian politician in his own right. The elder King was a Liberal Member of Parliament in the nineteenth century, and a Senator from 1896 until his death in 1928.

The younger King earned his MD from McGill University in 1895. After practicing medicine for a short period in New Brunswick, he moved to the Kootenay region of British Columbia in 1898 serving a large rural territory. In 1910, he attended an international medical conference in Budapest, and played a leading role in establishing the American College of Surgeons in Chicago, serving as a governor of the college. In 1932, he was created a Knight of Grace of the Venerable Order of the Hospital of St. John of Jerusalem for his services to medicine.

In 1903, King was elected as a British Columbia Liberal Party member of the British Columbia Legislative Assembly for the riding of Cranbrook and was re-elected in 1907 before leaving provincial politics in 1909 to return to medicine.

A supporter of Sir Wilfrid Laurier, King was a Liberal candidate in the riding of Kootenay in the 1911 federal election but was defeated. He returned to the provincial legislature in 1916, joining the provincial cabinet as Minister of Public Works. He served in that portfolio until 1922 when he was offered a federal Cabinet position by Prime Minister William Lyon Mackenzie King. J.H. King became Minister of Public Works shortly before winning a by-election to enter the House of Commons of Canada as MP for Kootenay East.

In 1926, King became Minister of Soldiers’ Civil Reestablishment and minister responsible for the Department of Health. In 1928, he became the country's first Minister of Pensions and National Health. He was appointed to the Senate on Prime Minister Mackenzie King's recommendation on June 7, 1930, shortly before the defeat of Mackenzie King's government.

In 1942, King returned to Cabinet as Leader of the Government in the Canadian Senate. In this capacity, he attended the June 1945 San Francisco Conference that established the United Nations. In August 1945, he was appointed Speaker of the Senate of Canada chairing sessions of the upper house until 1949. He then served as co-chairman of the joint Senate–House of Commons Committee on Old Age Security which reported in 1950. King remained a Senator until his death in 1955. He died in office, and was buried in British Columbia, at Ocean View Cemetery in Burnaby.

Government offices
Preceded by Raoul Dandurand	Leader of the Government in the Senate of Canada; 1942–1945	Succeeded by Wishart McLea Robertson
