= Murray McFarlane =

Canadian politician

Member of Parliament for Kootenay East
- In office March 1958 – June 1962

Personal details
- Born: Murray Lincoln McFarlane; 2 September 1908 Cranbrook, British Columbia, Canada
- Died: 10 October 1989 (aged 81)
- Party: Progressive Conservative
- Spouse(s): Margaret Elizabeth Whebell m. 16 September 1935
- Profession: Timekeeper

Murray Lincoln McFarlane (2 September 1908 – 10 October 1989) was a Progressive Conservative party member of the House of Commons of Canada. Born in Cranbrook, British Columbia, he was a timekeeper by career.

After an unsuccessful bid to win the Kootenay East riding in the 1957 federal election, McFarlane succeeded there in the following general election in 1958. He served only one term, the 24th Canadian Parliament, as he was defeated at Kootenay East in the 1962, 1963 and 1965 elections.

McFarlane also served as a school board trustee from 1944 to 1948, then as a school board chair from 1949 to 1957.
