= Noel Wallinger =

Canadian politician

Noel S. A. A. Wallinger

MLA for Cranbrook
- In office 1922–1928
- Preceded by: James Horace King
- Succeeded by: Frank Mitchell MacPherson

Personal details
- Born: March 12, 1865 London, England
- Died: March 4, 1948 (aged 82) Victoria, British Columbia, Canada
- Party: Conservative
- Occupation: government agent

Noel Stirling Austin Arnold Wallinger (March 12, 1865 – March 4, 1948) was an English-born miner, civil servant and political figure in British Columbia. He represented Cranbrook in the Legislative Assembly of British Columbia from 1922 to 1928 as a Conservative.

He was born in London, the son of James Nasmyth Arnold Wallinger and Marian Collier, and was educated at the King's College School in London and the Royal Agricultural College. Wallinger came to Canada in 1884. In 1895, he married Jessie Ariel Beale. He served as government agent and gold commissioner from 1914 to 1922. Wallinger was first elected to the assembly in a 1922 by-election held after James Horace King resigned to run for a federal seat. He was defeated by Frank Mitchell MacPherson when he ran for reelection to a third term in 1928. Wallinger died in Victoria at the age of 82.
