= Reconstruction Party of Canada =

- Former federal party
- Founder: Henry Herbert Stevens
- Founded: 7 July 1935
- Dissolved: 1938
- Split from: Conservative Party
- Ideology: Keynesianism; National conservatism Isolationism
- Political position: Centre-right to right-wing

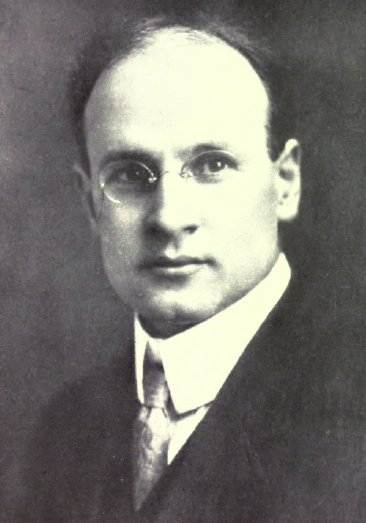
Henry Herbert Stevens

The Reconstruction Party was a Canadian political party founded in 1935 by Henry Herbert Stevens, a long-time Conservative Member of Parliament (MP). Stevens served as Minister of Trade in the Arthur Meighen government of 1921, and as Minister of Trade and Commerce from 1930 to 1934 in the Depression-era government of R. B. Bennett.

He was Chairman of the Price-Spreads Commission in 1934. Stevens argued for drastic economic reform and government intervention in the economy. He quit the Bennett government and formed the Reconstruction Party when it became evident that the Tories would not implement the proposals of the Price-Spreads Commission.

The party was also isolationist: it opposed Canadian involvement in a European war and opposed the League of Nations sanctions against Fascist Italy for its invasion of Ethiopia.

The Reconstruction Party nominated 174 candidates in the 1935 federal election. It won more votes nationally than the other new parties. The Liberal vote was 2,076,394, the Conservatives 1,308,688, and that for the Reconstruction Party 389,708; while the Co-operative Commonwealth Federation and the Social Credit parties garnered 386,484 and 187,045 votes respectively. Many of the votes that the party won were taken away from the Conservative Party. In 48 ridings, the margin of victory for the Liberal candidate over the Conservative candidate was less than the number of votes received by the Reconstruction Party candidate.

Despite receiving 8.7% of the vote, the party won only one seat in the House of Commons of Canada - H. H. Stevens in the Kootenay East riding. The Reconstruction Party came to an end when Stevens rejoined the Conservatives in 1938.

The party had a short-lived provincial wing in Alberta. The Alberta wing ran one candidate in the 1935 Alberta provincial election and picked up 192 votes.

== Party program ==
Fifteen points summarized the "New National Policy of Reconstruction and Reform", including:

- a pledge to youth,
- a system of public works, including the completion of the Trans-Canada Highway,
- a national housing program; and
- in order to balance the budget, a Reconstruction government would administer federal taxes "through a single set of auditors" and would invite the provinces to cooperate in the system that would divide the returns on "an equitable and agreeable basis."

== See also ==
- List of federal political parties in Canada
