= Stan Graham =

Canadian politician (1926–2010)

Member of Parliament for Kootenay East—Revelstoke
- In office 1979–1980
- Preceded by: riding recreated
- Succeeded by: Sid Parker
- In office 1984–1988
- Preceded by: Sid Parker
- Succeeded by: Sid Parker

Personal details
- Born: 29 January 1926 Northern Ireland
- Died: 30 September 2010 (aged 84) White Rock, British Columbia
- Party: Progressive Conservative
- Spouse: Eileen Graham
- Profession: businessman

Stan Thomas Graham (29 January 1926 – 30 September 2010) was a Progressive Conservative party member of the House of Commons of Canada. Born in Northern Ireland, he had a career as a businessman.

He was elected at the Kootenay East—Revelstoke electoral district in the 1979 federal election, but was defeated in the 1980 election by Sid Parker of the New Democratic Party. Graham returned to national politics when he won back the riding in 1984 federal election, but again lost his seat in the 1988 election after a defeat in Kootenay East to Parker. Graham did not campaign for further terms in Parliament. He died in 2010. Stan died September 30 after a long illness, his family by his side. He had a wife Eileen, daughter Barbara and son-in-law Bjorn. Stan was born January 29, 1926, in Northern Ireland. A veteran of WWII, he immigrated to Canada with his young family in 1952. Owning his own business which serviced the geophysical industry, Stan retired in 1976. Elected twice as a Member of Parliament he worked for the riding of Kootenay - East Revelstoke. He was appointed to the Nat'l Parole Board in 1989.
