= Cranbrook (electoral district) =

Defunct provincial electoral district in British Columbia, Canada

Cranbrook was the name of a provincial electoral district in the Canadian province of British Columbia centred on the town of Cranbrook in the southern Rockies and including nearby Kimberley and other towns in the southern end of the Rocky Mountain Trench.

Cranbrook riding made its first appearance on the hustings in the election of 1903. In a redistribution after the 1963 election the area covered by this riding was incorporated into the new Kootenay riding (same name but smaller than the original 1871-vintage Kootenay riding).

== Electoral history ==
Cranbrook elected members to the Legislative Assembly of British Columbia from 1903 to 1963. The results of these elections were:

Note: Winners of each election are in bold.

10th British Columbia election, 1903
Party	Candidate	Votes	%	±	Expenditures
Conservative	Thomas Donald Caven	435	46.52%		unknown
**Liberal**	**James Horace King**	500	53.48%		unknown
Total valid votes		935	100.00%		
Total rejected ballots					
Turnout		%			

11th British Columbia election, 1907
Party	Candidate	Votes	%	±	Expenditures
Conservative	Albert Harvey	**378**	**35.59 %**		unknown
Independent Socialist	Edward Kelley	211	19.87%		unknown
**Liberal**	**James Horace King**	**473**	**44.54%**		unknown
Total valid votes		1,062	100.00%		
Total rejected ballots					
Turnout		%			

12th British Columbia election, 1909
Party	Candidate	Votes	%	±	Expenditures
Conservative	**Thomas Donald Caven**	**761**	**54.16%**		unknown
Socialist	John William Fitch	143	10.18%	–	unknown
Liberal	Malcolm Archibald MacDonald	501	35.66%		unknown
Total valid votes		1,405	100.00%		
Total rejected ballots					
Turnout		%			

13th British Columbia election, 1912
Party	Candidate	Votes	%	±	Expenditures
Conservative	**Thomas Donald Caven**	**Accl.**	-.- %		unknown
Total valid votes		n/a	-.-%		
Total rejected ballots					
Turnout		%			

14th British Columbia election, 1916
Party	Candidate	Votes	%	±	Expenditures
Conservative	Thomas Donald Caven	504	40.94%		unknown
**Liberal**	**James Horace King**	727	59.06%		unknown
Total valid votes		1,231	100.00%		
Total rejected ballots					
Turnout		%			

15th British Columbia election, 1920
Party	Candidate	Votes	%	±	Expenditures
Independent Conservative	Thomas Donald Caven	905	49.02%		
**Liberal**	**James Horace King**	941	50.98%		
Total valid votes		1,846	100.00%		

16th British Columbia election, 1924
Party	Candidate	Votes	%	±	Expenditures
Liberal	John Taylor	1,062	44.47%		unknown
Conservative	**Noel Stirling Austin Arnold Wallinger**	1,326	55.53%		unknown
Total valid votes		2,388	100.00%		
Total rejected ballots					
Turnout		%			

17th British Columbia election, 1928
Party	Candidate	Votes	%	±	Expenditures
**Liberal**	**Frank Mitchell MacPherson**	**1,833**	**52.46%**		unknown
Conservative	Noel Stirling Austin Arnold Wallinger	1,661	47.54%		unknown
Total valid votes		3,494	100.00%		
Total rejected ballots		55			
Turnout		%			

18th British Columbia election, 1933
Party	Candidate	Votes	%	±	Expenditures
United Front (Workers and Farmers)	Robert Adams	62	1.46%	–	unknown
Co-operative Commonwealth Fed.	Charles Bennett	1,231	29.01%		unknown
**Liberal**	**Frank Mitchell MacPherson**	**2,951**	**69.53%**		unknown
Total valid votes		4,244	100.00%		
Total rejected ballots		33			
Turnout		%			

18th British Columbia election, 1937
Party	Candidate	Votes	%	±	Expenditures
**Liberal**	**Frank Mitchell MacPherson**	**3,110**	**76.73%**		unknown
Co-operative Commonwealth Fed.	Samuel Smith Shearer	943	23.27%		unknown
Total valid votes		4,053	100.00%		
Total rejected ballots		79			
Turnout		%			

19th British Columbia election, 1941
Party	Candidate	Votes	%	±	Expenditures
Co-operative Commonwealth Fed.	Oscar Albin Eliasin	1,548	33.89%		unknown
Conservative	Frank William Green	**1,615**	**35.35%**		unknown
Liberal	Arnold Joseph McGrath	1,405	30.76%		unknown
Total valid votes		4,568	100.00%		
Total rejected ballots		52			
Turnout		%			

19th British Columbia election, 1945
Party	Candidate	Votes	%	±	Expenditures
Labor-Progressive	William Brown	193	4.56%		unknown
Co-operative Commonwealth Fed.	Henry Gammon	1,965	46.40%		unknown
Coalition	**Frank William Green**	**2,077**	**49.04%**	–	unknown
Total valid votes		4,235	100.00%		
Total rejected ballots		40			
Turnout		%			

20th British Columbia election, 1949
Party	Candidate	Votes	%	±	Expenditures
**Co-operative Commonwealth Fed.**	**Leo Thomas Nimsick**	**3,026**	**50.53%**		unknown
Coalition	Clifford Swan	2,963	49.47%	–	unknown
Total valid votes		5,989	100.00%		
Total rejected ballots		87			
Turnout		%			

21st British Columbia election, 1952 ^{3}
Party	Candidate	Votes 1st count	%	Votes final count	%	±%	
B.C. Social Credit League	Howard Cressman King	2,328	34.23%	3,044	48.67%		unknown
Liberal	Maurice Gregory Klinkhammer	1,111	16.33%	-	-.- %		unknown
Conservative	George England Kerr MacDonald	675	9.92%	-	-.- %		unknown
**Co-operative Commonwealth Fed.**	**Leo Thomas Nimsick**	**2,688**	**39.52%**	**3,210**	**51.33%**		unknown
Total valid votes		6,802	100.00%	6,254			
Total rejected ballots		168					
Turnout		%					
^{3} Preferential ballot. First and final of three counts only shown.

22nd British Columbia election, 1953 ^{4}
Party	Candidate	Votes 1st count	%	Votes final count	%	±%	
Liberal	George Wayne Haddad	1,615	23.79%	-	-.- %		unknown
Social Credit	Howard Cressman King	2,219	32.69%	2,756	44.34%		
**Co-operative Commonwealth Fed.**	**Leo Thomas Nimsick**	**2,955**	**43.52%**	**3,460**	**555.66%**		unknown
Total valid votes		6,789	100.00%	6,216			
Total rejected ballots		238					
Turnout		%					
^{4} Preferential ballot. First and second of two counts only shown.

23rd British Columbia election, 1956
Party	Candidate	Votes	%	±	Expenditures
Liberal	Francis Vincent Downey	902	14.47%		unknown
**Co-operative Commonwealth Fed.**	**Leo Thomas Nimsick**	**3,321**	**53.26%**		
Social Credit	Robert Earl Sang	2,012	32.27%	–	unknown
Total valid votes		6,235	100.00%		
Total rejected ballots		54			
Turnout		%			

24th British Columbia election, 1960
Party	Candidate	Votes	%	±	Expenditures
Liberal	Jack Glennie	1,475	23.39 %		unknown
**Co-operative Commonwealth Fed.**	**Leo Thomas Nimsick**	**2,786**	**44.18%**		unknown
Social Credit	Frank Joseph Butala	1,700	26.96%	–	unknown
Progressive Conservative	Willie Harvey Webber	345	5.47%		unknown
Total valid votes		6,306	100.00%		
Total rejected ballots		67			
Turnout		%			

25th British Columbia election, 1963
Party	Candidate	Votes	%	±	Expenditures
Conservative	William Otis Green	1,526	23.27%		unknown
Liberal	Lloyd James Hoole	835	12.73%		unknown
Social Credit	Robert Owen Jones	1,633	24.90%	–	unknown
New Democratic	**Leo Thomas Nimsick**	**2,563**	**39.09%**		unknown
Total valid votes		6,557	100.00%		
Total rejected ballots		35			
Turnout		%			

Following the 1963 election the Cranbrook riding was redistributed and a new riding, Kootenay was formed (same name as the original 1871 Kootenay riding, but much smaller in scope). The Kootenay riding combined Cranbrook with the riding of Fernie and parts of the Columbia ridings.

== See also ==
- List of British Columbia provincial electoral districts
- Canadian provincial electoral districts
