= First Christian Reformed Church of London =

Church in Ontario, Canada

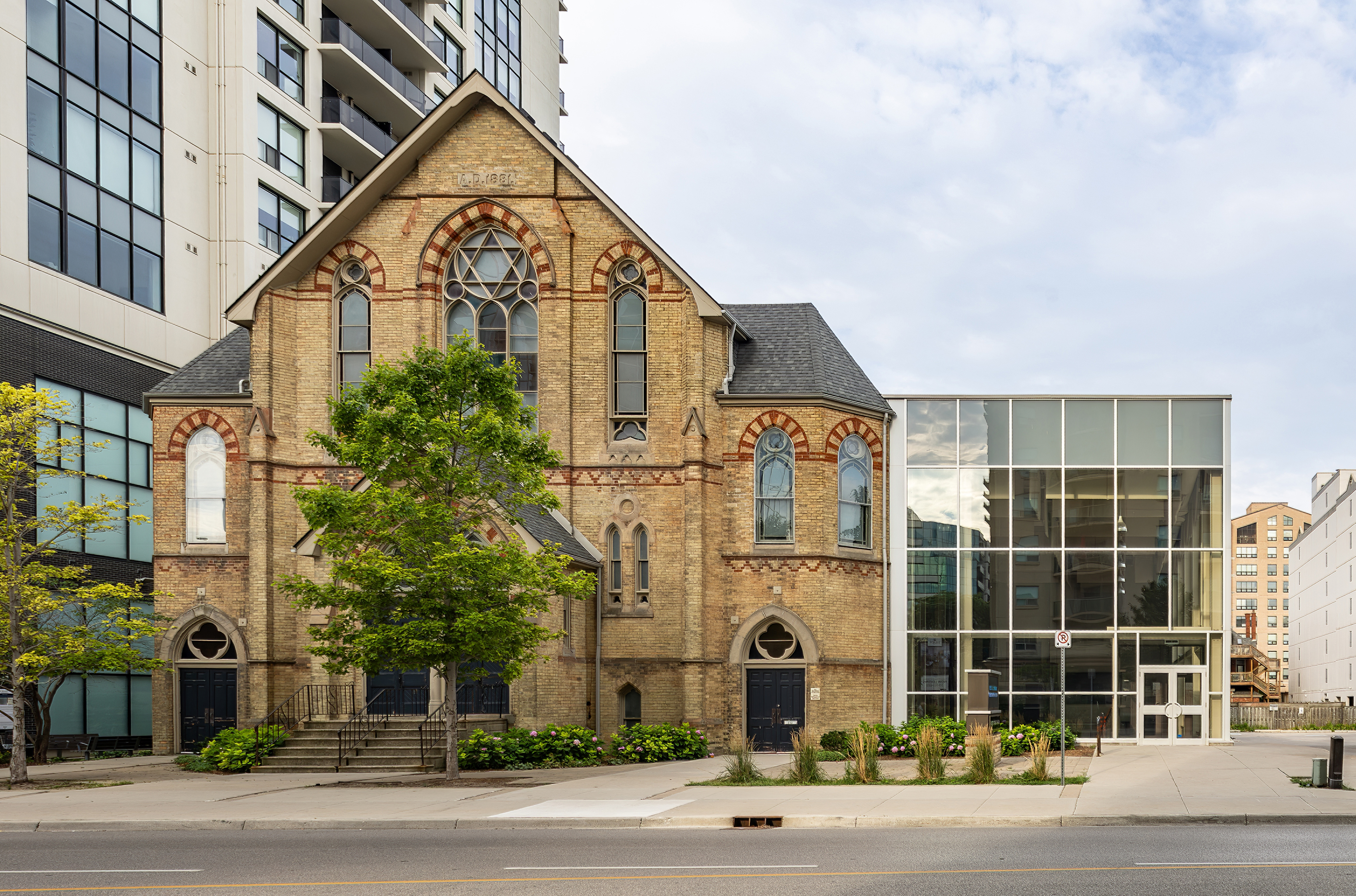
- First Christian Reformed Church in 2026
- First Christian Reformed Church of London
- 42°59′11″N 81°15′15″W
- Country: Canada
- Denomination: Christian Reformed Church

History
- Former name: Talbot Street Baptist Church
- Founded: 1882

Architecture
- Architect: Thomas Henry Tracy; George F. Durand
- Architectural type: Gothic Revival architecture

Clergy
- Priest: William Jones

The First Christian Reformed Church of London, previously known as the Talbot Street Baptist Church and popularly known as the Talbot Street Church, is a Christian Reformed Church in London, Ontario, Canada. Built between 1881 and 1882 following a design by Thomas Henry Tracy and George F. Durand, the building was intended to provide a space for London's growing Baptist community. In 1953, the church was sold to the Christian Reformed Church, which began holding services in 1954. The Reformed Church has continued to occupy the space, maintaining and expanding the building.

Architecturally, the church is a three-storey building in the Gothic Revival style built with white brick and accents of red sandstone and grey stone. It has been noted for its polygonal stair towers, as well as its multiple high windows and lancet arches. Modifications made since the original construction have included the removal of the bell-cote and the addition of a new wing for classrooms. The church was designated under the Ontario Heritage Act by the City of London in 2000.

== Description ==
The First Christian Reformed Church is located at 513 Talbot Street in London, Ontario, Canada. It is identified by Alice Gibb of the Architectural Conservancy of Ontario as having been built in the Gothic Revival style. A parsonage in white brick was located beside the church.

The church is a three-storey building, dominated by white brick with dichromatic accents (red sandstone and grey stone), with a foundation of fieldstone. The facade features polygonal stair towers on each side, with a small projection for the double-leaf main doors; these doors, which are panelled with diagonal boarding, are separated by a composite column and capped with a lunette as well as an elaborate transom. Above these doors is a three-light window with a Star of David. To its sides are lancet windows, which have drip moulds in grey stone. Paired lancet windows sit further to the sides. The church has lancet arches above its windows and doors.

The broad main hall of the church runs roughly parallel to the outer border of the side doors, its breadth concealed by the stair towers. Large windows can be found on the north and south foundation, which provide light for the Sunday school in the basement. The interior of the building has a semi-circular seating arrangement, with its U-shaped balcony featuring ornate railings. The wooden folding chairs are sided in cast iron and include hat racks underneath. The roof is supported by a series of tie beams.

== History ==
The first Baptist congregation in London, Ontario, was formed in 1845, building on the religious perspective introduced by American missionaries. In five years, it grew from nine to approximately fifty congregants, leading to the construction of its first chapel. By 1880, the congregation was too large for this chapel, and the Baptists decided to build a new church. In 1881, the congregation retained the architecture firm of Thomas Henry Tracy and George F. Durand to design a large church. The new church, which Tracy attributed to Durand, was built through 1882, and designed to accommodate 920 people—600 on the ground floor and 320 on a balcony. It cost approximately $17,500 (equivalent to $514,000 in 2025).

In subsequent years, the Baptist congregation painted the bichromatic masonry red, emulating the style of later buildings, and installed an iron railing around the balcony. It also expanded its reach, establishing a mission school in northeastern London in the late 19th century. In 1945, William Sherwood Fox, the president of the University of Western Ontario, published a book to celebrate the centennial of the congregation.

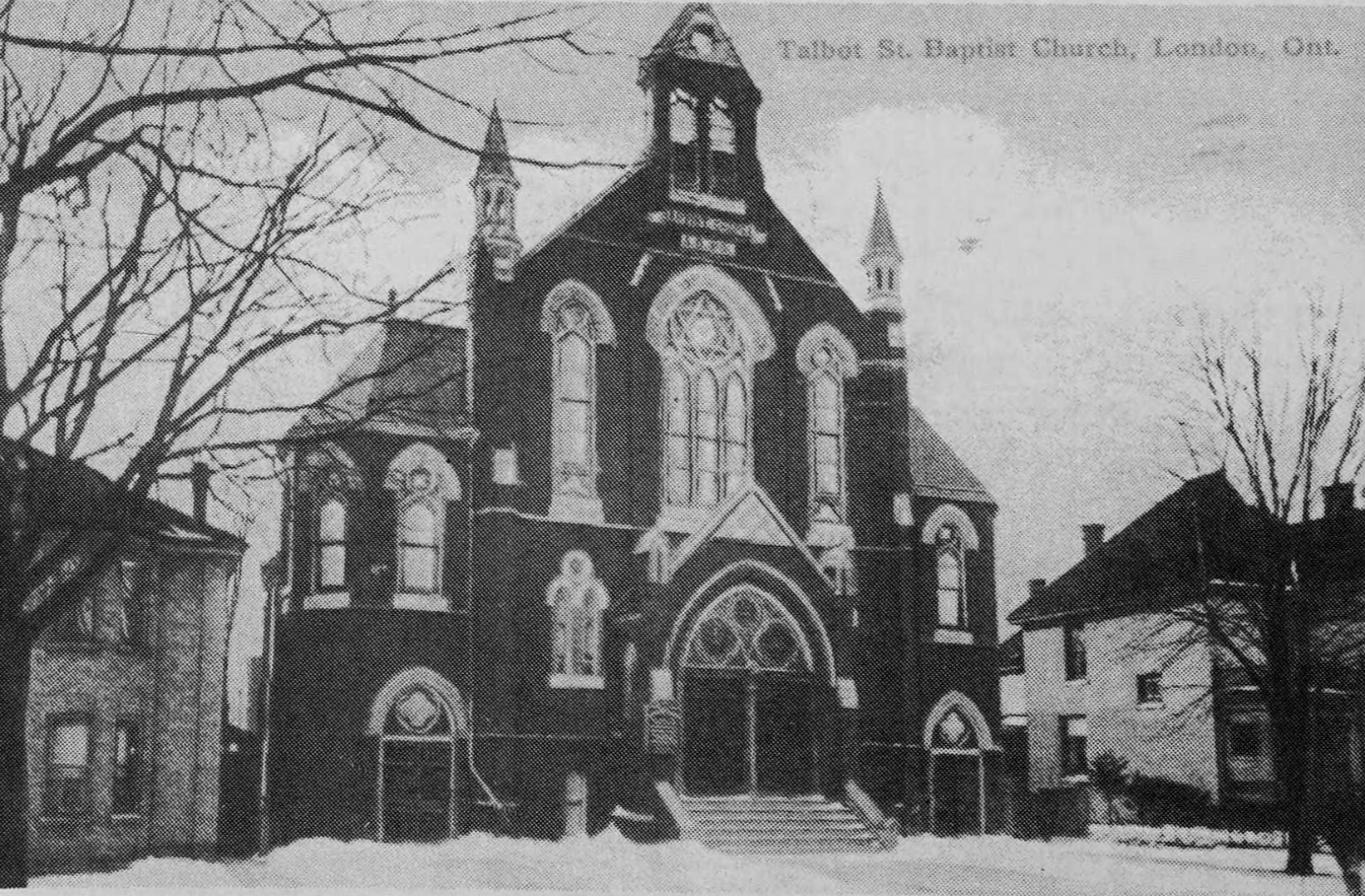
"Talbot St. Baptist Church, London, Ont." postcard (c. 1910) showing bell-cote and other details that were later altered

The Baptist congregation moved to 568 Richmond Street in 1953, seeking a larger space. Its former building was sold to the Christian Reformed Church. A dedication service was held on March 27, 1954, with Minister John Gritter leading the congregation for the first four years of its existence. The congregation allowed the original bichromatic masonry to be exposed. Issues with a main truss led to the replacement of the roof, which necessitated the removal of the pinnacles and bell-cote. In their place, overhanging eaves were installed, though the architecture historians Nancy Tausky and Lynne Distefano describe the result as a "rather abrupt termination". A western addition was constructed to provide additional meeting spaces and classrooms.

The church was designated under the Ontario Heritage Act by the City of London in 2000 through By-Law L.S.P. – 3318-193, at which time it was intended to be part of a proposed conservation district. It is one of the few remaining churches designed by Durand in the London area. At the time of designation, several of the stained glass windows were original, including those above the front portal as well as the glass borders of the chancel windows.

The First Christian Reformed Church of London is part of the Ontario Southwest classis. In 2011, the congregation established Sanctuary London, a street-level ministry that offers food, art and music workshops, and worship services to homeless persons. It has also sponsored London Serve, a programme designed to mobilize volunteers in support of organizations such as Community Living, Habitat for Humanity, and the London Food Bank. A glass atrium to the side of the church is used for several activities, including youth programs and a community kitchen. As of 2025, the congregation was led by Minister William Jones and reported a membership of 225 congregants.

== Works cited ==
- Brown, Dan (July 14, 2022). "Christian Teens Express Faith though Service". The London Free Press. London, Ontario. p. A3 – via ProQuest.
- Canadian Urban Institute (April 2025). "Sacred Spaces, Civic Value" (PDF). Canadian Urban Institute. Archived from the original (PDF) on May 6, 2026.
- City of London (September 15, 2000). "Designation of 513 Talbot Street". Heritage Trust. Archived from the original on January 4, 2023.
- "First Baptist Church". London Public Library. Archived from the original on May 6, 2026.
- "First Christian Reformed Church". Canada's Historic Places. Parks Canada. Archived from the original on April 6, 2026.
- Gibb, Alice (1989). Brackets & Bargeboards, London: Architectural Walks in London, Ontario. London, Ontario: Architectural Conservancy of Ontario. ISBN 978-0-929026-02-2.
- History of the County of Middlesex, Canada. Toronto and London: W. A. & C. L. Goodspeed. 1889.
- Landon, Fred (September 1945). "A Century of Service: A History of the Talbot Street Baptist Church 1845-1945". The Canadian Historical Review. 26 (3): 324–325.
- "Talbot Street Church". Christian Reformed Church of North America. Archived from the original on May 6, 2026.
- Tausky, Nancy Z.; Distefano, Lynne D. (2018). Victorian Architecture in London and Southwestern Ontario: Symbols of Aspiration. Toronto: University of Toronto Press. ISBN 978-1-4875-8257-9. JSTOR 10.3138/j.ctvfrxbbj.
- Van Brenk, Debora (January 1, 2016). "A Community as Much as a Bed". The London Free Press. London, Ontario – via ProQuest.
