= George Durand =

George Durand may refer to several individuals.

- George F. Durand (1850–1899), Canadian architect
- George H. Durand (1838–1903), American jurist
