= Waverly (London, Ontario) =

Retirement home in Ontario, Canada

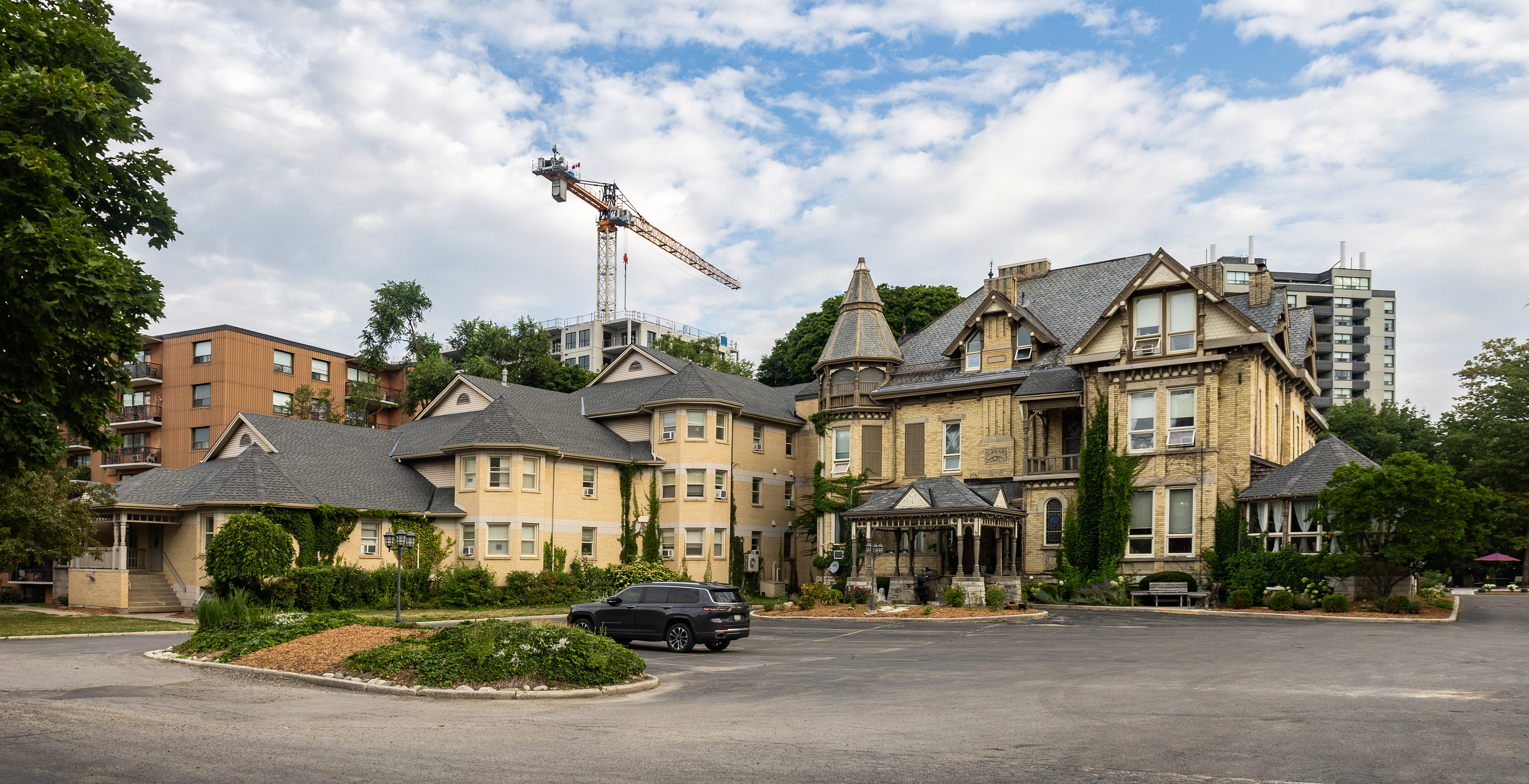
- Waverly, 2026
- Interactive map of the Waverly area

General information
- Architectural style: Queen Anne
- Location: 10 Grand Avenue, London, Ontario, Canada
- Coordinates: 42°58′19″N 81°14′49″W
- Year built: 1882

Technical details
- Floor count: 2.5

Design and construction
- Architects: Hamilton Tovey; George F. Durand

Waverly (also spelled Waverley) is a former mansion and current retirement home in London, Ontario, Canada. Commissioned by Charles Goodhue in 1881, the original design by the British architect Hamilton Tovey was modified by the Canadian architect George F. Durand before construction was completed in 1882. After Goodhue's death, the mansion was sold to the oil magnate Thomas Smallman in 1893; his family remained in the mansion until 1948, making several additions and moving the entrance to the north facade. The building was used by the Shute Institute until the 1980s, at which time it was converted into a retirement home and a new wing was built.

Located at 10 Grand Avenue, once a fashionable area for London's wealthy families, Waverly is primarily in the Queen Anne style. It features a varied roofline, marked with extensive ornamentation, including towers, gables, dormers, chimneys, and a belvedere. The white-brick walls are punctuated by elongated windows as well as ornaments of moulded stone and terra cotta. The interior has been noted for its parquet floors and carved wooden ceilings. Waverly was designated under the Ontario Heritage Act in 1996.

== Description ==
Waverly is located at 10 Grand Avenue in London, Ontario, Canada. It is a two-and-a-half storey former mansion designed in the Queen Anne style, though some features draw on the Gothic Revival movement. In his book on heritage architecture in London, John Elliott described Waverly as "an example of High Victorian architecture at its most eclectic and expressive." It is one of two Victorian mansions still standing on Grand Avenue, the other being Idlewyld at 36 Grand Avenue, and one of the largest surviving domestic residences in London.

The building is of a white-brick construction, with further brick ornamentation. The roofline is varied, being marked by shingled gables and dormers as well as chimneys, bracketed eaves, as well as a belvedere, with heavy supports and delicate trim. It features several towers, which have diverse ornamentation. The building features several porches, some of which are rounded, which are marked by turned posts and spindles. The exterior friezes are decorated with sunflowers; other exterior decorations include moulded stone and terra cotta. Above the stone porte-cochère, the name "Waverley" is carved.

The interior of the building extensively features parquet floors and carved wooden ceilings. It also features a staircase with carved newel posts, which are decorated with sunflowers. Windows vary, and include stained glass windows with the Smallman family crest as well as bottle-glass windows in the entrance hall. Other windows are elongated, with their exterior profiles topped with stone heads. The "Blue Room", measuring 52 by 26 feet (15.8 m × 7.9 m), has been noted for its blue damasque wallpaper and cherry wood ceiling.

== History ==
=== Goodhue ===
Waverly was commissioned by Charles Goodhue, a founding member of the London Club (a gentlemen's club) and a Freemason. The son of George Jervis Goodhue, a lawyer and entrepreneur identified as London's first millionaire, Goodhue had received his inheritance in 1880, ten years after his father's death. At the time, Grand Avenue was a favoured location for new upper-class London homes. Waverly was built there on 5 acres (2.0 ha) of land that had been owned by George Goodhue. It was named after George Goodhue's house on Bathurst Street, which had, in turn, been named after Sir Walter Scott's 1814 novel Waverley.

Initial drafts were completed by the British architect Hamilton Tovey, who was married to Goodhue's sister, in 1881. These were subsequently modified by George F. Durand, a local architect who finalized the design. Durand retained the original floorplan, but extensively modified the external elements with Goodhue's approval. In their survey of Victorian architecture in Southwestern Ontario, Nancy Tausky and Lynne Distefano write that Tovey's initial design followed High Victorian principles of emphasizing "massiveness through simple, broad lines", while Durand installed diverse details to minimize unoccupied space. Waverly was deemed the largest of the city's private residences at the time of its completion in 1882.

=== Smallman ===
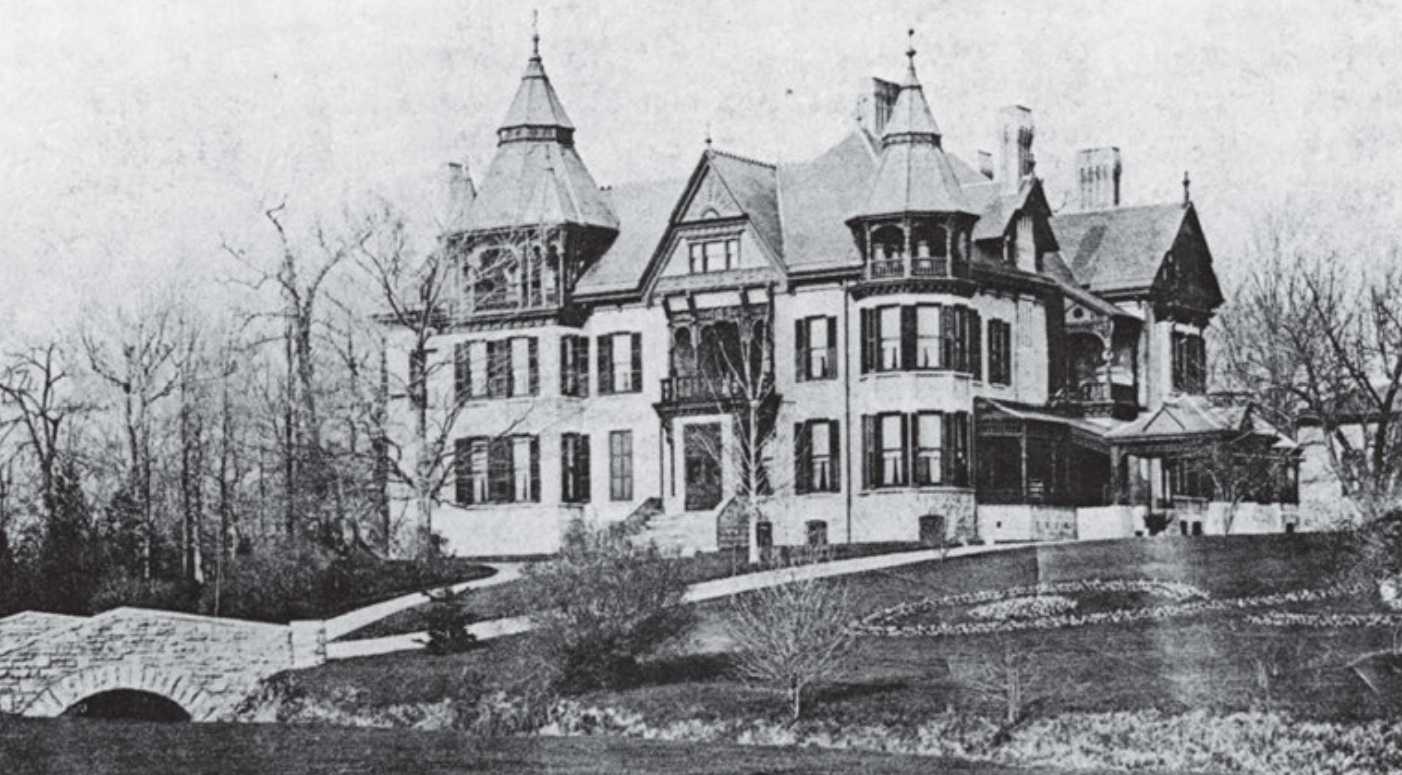
Waverly in 1898, north face

Goodhue died in 1890, leaving a wife and two children. In 1893, the estate sold the house to Thomas Smallman, who had established the Imperial Oil Company and worked with the London Life Insurance Company. As newer buildings in the area had been built larger, during his ownership, Smallman commissioned a rear addition and multi-turreted belvedere. The additions were entrusted to John Mackenzie Moore and his partner Fred Henry, who worked on them circa 1897.

These additions emulated the style of the existing building, including its double-tiered tower roof. They also resulted in the main entrance to the building shifting to the north side, across the Traction Creek. As a consequence, much of the internal architecture of the building was also modified. A former study was transformed into the main entrance hall, which also provided access to a ballroom. The drawing room was made into a library, while the previous entrance on the south face was provided a porte-cochère while still being reduced to secondary status.

Thomas Smallman died in 1918. His wife and their daughter Eleanor remained at the house, and after Mrs. Smallman died in 1933, Eleanor remained with her husband Claude Morgan. The couple added parquet floors and wooden ceilings. Other additions included a conservatory as well as a porch, which covered part of the Durand-built facade.

=== Later occupants ===
Eleanor and Claude Morgan occupied the mansion until 1948, after which time it was sold to the Shute Institute. Operated by doctors Wilfrid and Evan Shute, the institute conducted research into Vitamin E and its potential health benefits while simultaneously treating patients. The Shute Institue remained at Waverly for several decades, during which time it maintained the mansion and its architecture. Evan Shute died in 1978, with his brother following four years later, and their institute moved to Princess Avenue.

In 1986, Waverly was in the process of being converted into a retirement home, and operations began under Diversicare Canada Management Services in 1987. A new wing was commissioned for the home. Built on the southwest side and intended to hold residential rooms, the new wing was designed to emulate the style of the existing architecture. However, Alice Gibb of the Architectural Conservancy of Ontario describes it as "unfortunately ... the dominant feature of the complex" due to its size, and Tausky decries the addition's blocking of the Moore-built facade. The internal elements, including carved wood ceilings and silk brocade, were retained.

On March 18, 1996, Waverly was designated by the City of London under the Ontario Heritage Act through By-Law L.S.P-3271-156. A historical plaque was unveiled on the site on December 6, 2001. While remaining operational as a retirement home, Waverly has been opened to the public during doors open events. As of 2026, the facility is operated by Comfort of Living under the branding Waverley Mansion.

== Works cited ==
- Armstrong, Frederick Henry (1986). The Forest City: An Illustrated History of London, Canada. Northridge, California: Windsor Publications. ISBN 978-0-89781-180-4.
- Elliott, John K. (1991). London Heritage. London, Ontario: Phelps Publishing. ISBN 978-0-920298-89-3.
- Gibb, Alice (1989). Brackets & Bargeboards, London: Architectural Walks in London, Ontario. London, Ontario: Architectural Conservancy of Ontario. ISBN 978-0-929026-02-2.
- Kerboulas, Gary (2005). "Evan Shute". In Baker, Michael; Neary, Hilary Bates (eds.). 100 Fascinating Londoners. Toronto: James Lorimer & Company. p. 76.
- Tausky, Nancy Z. (1993). Historical Sketches of London: From Site to City. Peterborough, Ontario: Broadview Press. ISBN 978-0-921149-49-1.
- Tausky, Nancy Z.; Distefano, Lynne D. (2018). Victorian Architecture in London and Southwestern Ontario: Symbols of Aspiration. Toronto: University of Toronto Press. doi:10.3138/j.ctvfrxbbj. ISBN 978-1-4875-8257-9.
- "Waverley Mansion". Comfort of Living. Archived from the original on April 19, 2026.
- "Waverly". Canada's Historic Places. Parks Canada. Archived from the original on April 6, 2026.
- "Waverly Mansion". London Public Library. Archived from the original on April 19, 2026.
