= Gabriel Kney =

Canadian pipe organ builder (1929–2024)

Gabriel Kney (21 November 1929 – 8 November 2024) was a Canadian builder of pipe organs based in London, Ontario.

== Life and career ==
Kney was born in Speyer, Germany. At the age of 15, he apprenticed to Paul Sattel of Speyer to become an organ builder, and concurrently studied organ and composition with Erhard Quack and Ludwig Doerr at the Bishop’s Institute for Church Music in Speyer.

In 1951, he moved to Canada to work as a voicer with the Keates Organ Co.

In 1955 he formed with John Bright the Kney and Bright Organ Co to build tracker organs. Blanton (1957) described their first instrument as "a handsome little organ with mechanical action, slider chests, 1-3/4" pressure". They were at the vanguard of the tracker organ revival in Canada, so much so that they were then to build 30 electro-pneumatic organs before customers caught on and started ordering instruments with mechanical action. In the early 1960s, they rebuilt the organs of Aeolian Hall in London and St Michael's Cathedral in Toronto.

In 1967, Kney formed Gabriel Kney Pipe Organ Builders, Ltd., and by 1990 he and his seven employees had built more than 130 organs for customers across the United States and Canada. Some of the best examples of this company's designs are the organs of Roy Thomson Hall in Toronto, Ontario, Grace and Holy Trinity Cathedral in Kansas City, Christ Church Parish in Pensacola, Florida, and the University of St. Thomas in St. Paul, Minnesota.

Kney died on 8 November 2024, at the age of 94.
