= Thomas Henry Tracy =

Canadian architect (1848–1925)

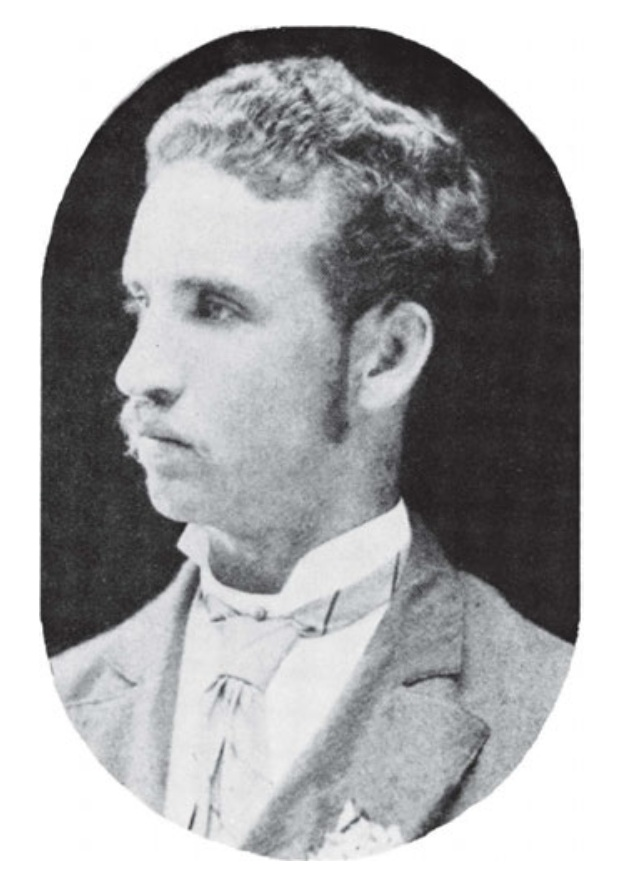
- Born: June 25, 1848; London, Upper Canada
- Died: October 31, 1925 (aged 77); Vancouver, British Columbia, Canada
- Occupations: Architect, alderman, Captain, Lieutenant-Colonel
- Years active: 1860s–1925
- Battles and Wars Fenian Raid North West Rebellion

Thomas Henry Tracy (June 25, 1848 – October 31, 1925) was a Canadian architect and alderman. Born in London, Upper Canada, to Irish immigrants, Tracy was apprenticed to William Robinson for five years beginning in 1864; after spending time working for Kivas Tully and Thomas Fuller, Tracy returned to Robinson in 1873, and he took control of the firm after the latter's 1878 retirement. Tracy left private practice in 1882, with George F. Durand assuming control of the firm and Tracy serving as full-time city engineer. Tracy moved to Vancouver, British Columbia, in 1891, to assume the position of city engineer. In that capacity, he helped design the city's waterworks; he also served five years as an alderman.

== Biography ==
=== Early life and career ===
Tracy was born London, Upper Canada, on June 25, 1848. He was the third of four children born to John and Mary (née Brady) Tracy, Irish immigrants from County Wexford. Educated in the city's public schools, in 1864 he was apprenticed to the city engineer William Robinson. Although Tracy was initially interested in becoming a land surveyor, through his apprenticeship he learned diverse aspects of architecture. He also became active in the military, winning a medal during the Fenian raid of 1866.

Upon completing his apprenticeship in 1869, Tracy found work with Kivas Tully, the provincial architect at the Department of Public Works. Tracy served as clerk of works during the construction of the London Lunatic Asylum, part of a provincial project to improve mental healthcare in Ontario. Built on a budget of CA$250,000 and designed to accommodate 500 patients, the asylum was designed by Tully and completed within 19 months. Although Tracy was recognized by the London Free Press for his vigilance, the building was subject to frequent complaints regarding its workmanship, and ultimately Robinson concluded that the building should have had more supervision to overcome its defects.

Tracy left the Department of Public Works in early 1872, then travelled to Chicago, Illinois, United States, to help with the rebuilding efforts after the previous year's Great Fire. He remained in Chicago until November, then moved to Albany, New York, where he joined fellow Robinson apprentice George F. Durand in assisting Thomas Fuller in the construction of the new capitol building. While in New York, Tracy married Sarah M. Bryan of Amsterdam. Fuller faced criticism for being non-American as well as the cost of the project, and in May 1873 Tracy returned to London, where he again began to work with Robinson.

=== London ===
Tracy, still facing controversy over his handling of the asylum, was entrusted with leading a staff of surveyors in defining the location and boundaries of London's streets. He developed a reputation for engineering, to the point of briefly acting as city architect while Robinson was away in 1874. He also worked with Robinson on a number of projects, including the First Congregational Church (1874–1876), as well as a high school at Dufferin and Waterloo.

At the same time, Tracy became involved with the Freemasons, becoming master of St. John's Lodge 209a for the years 1875 and 1876. Advancing in both the York and Scottish Rites, he would eventually become a grand junior warden with the Grand Lodge of Canada. His involvement with Freemasonry also extended to his architectural practice, with Tracy designing the Mechanics' Institute that began construction in 1876.

Upon Robinson's retirement in 1878, Tracy took over the firm, with his fellow apprentice Durand joining the staff; Durand was made partner in 1880. The firm produced several works. In 1879 alone, it completed the American Hotel—popularly known as the Grigg House—for Samuel Grigg and the Trinity Anglican Church in Birr. With Durand, Tracy often drew on Queen Anne influences, including in a since-demolished Federal Bank of Canada branch. Other works included the Masonic Temple and Grand Opera House (1880–1881) and the Palmyra Baptist Church in Palmyra.

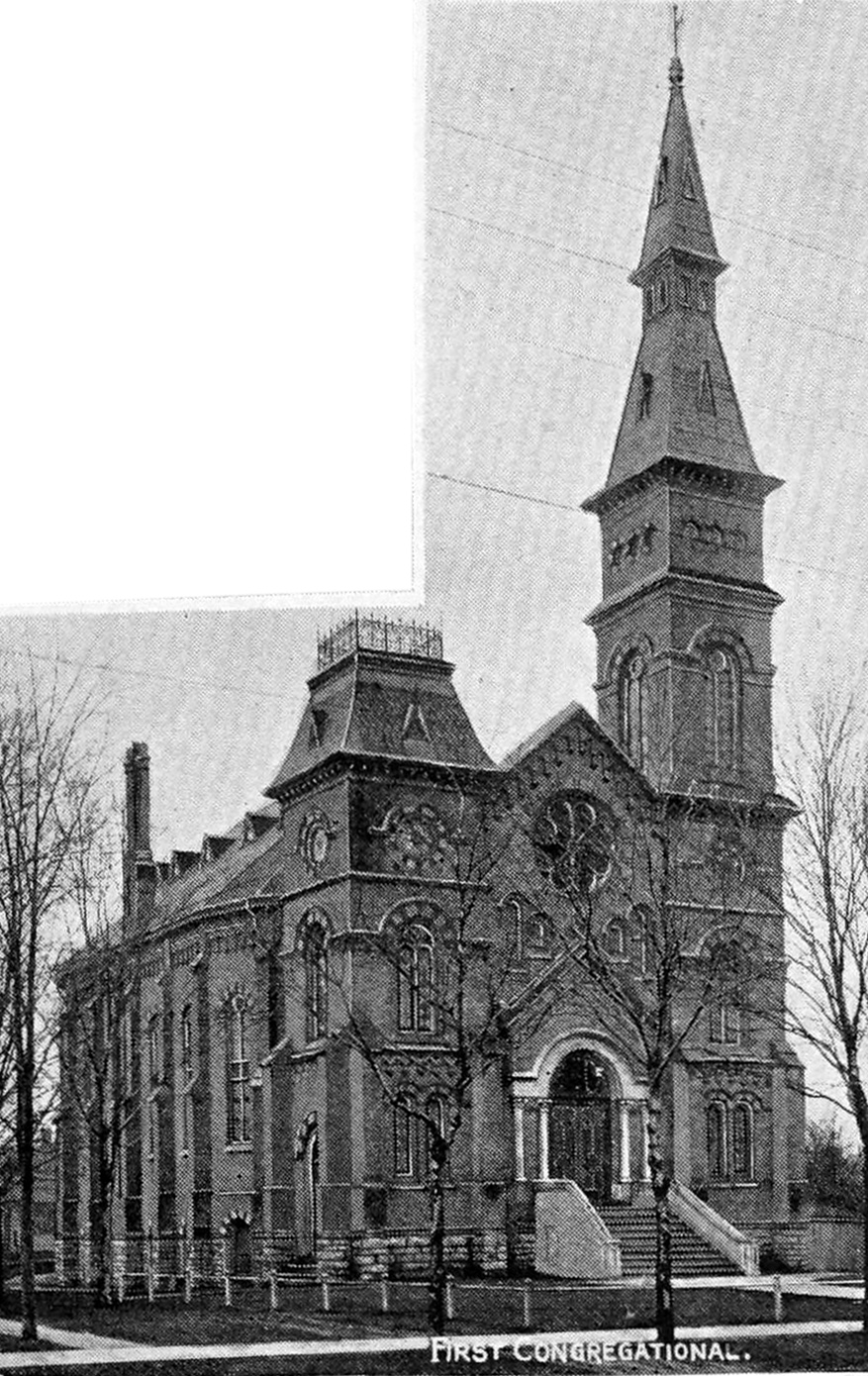
First Congregational Church (1876, destroyed by fire)

Tracy also replaced Robinson as London's part-time city architect, with one of his duties being the relocation of the Western Fair from its previous grounds. In 1882 he left the firm to serve as a full-time engineer for the water commissioners and the public and separate school boards. During the North-West Rebellion of 1885, Robinson entrusted the city engineer position to former staff member John Mackenzie Moore while he went to fight with the Seventh Fusiliers. A captain during the rebellion, Tracy would eventually attain the rank of lieutenant-colonel, leading the Seventh from 1889 to 1891.

=== Vancouver ===
In June 1891, the London Advertiser reported that Tracy would be touring Banff and, should he find the climate to his liking, potentially taking a city engineering position in Vancouver, British Columbia. On July 20, Tracy tendered his resignation in London and headed west. Tracy remained city engineer in Vancouver for fifteen years, during which time he helped develop the city's water system and its main thoroughfares. Another design, during an 1896 visit by Qing statesman Li Hongzhang, was a three-gated arch at the Canadian Pacific Railway pier that combined the Union Jack and tree boughs with Chinese lanterns and the dragon flag.

Tracy was elected alderman in 1920, holding that position for five years until his death on October 31, 1925. In a front-page obituary, the Vancouver Sun described him as having "an enviable reputation for integrity and gentlemanly bearing".

== Legacy ==
The First Congregational Church, completed in 1876, was destroyed by fire in 1968 while it hosted Aeolian Hall. Its sole remaining element, the tower at 379 Dundas Street, was designated by the City of London under the Ontario Heritage Act in 2006.

== Works cited ==
- Abbott, Frank A. (2021). "The Arches of Chinatown: Identity, Agency, and Belonging in Vancouver 1896–1936". Journal of the Canadian Historical Association. 30 (2): 149–181. doi:10.7202/1074380ar.
- History of the County of Middlesex, Canada. Toronto and London: W. A. & C. L. Goodspeed. 1889.
- "London Tower". Canada's Historic Places. Parks Canada. Archived from the original on April 12, 2026.
- Tausky, Nancy Z.; Distefano, Lynne D. (2018). Victorian Architecture in London and Southwestern Ontario: Symbols of Aspiration. Toronto: University of Toronto Press. ISBN 978-1-4875-8257-9. JSTOR 10.3138/j.ctvfrxbbj.
