= Roy Thomson Hall =

Concert hall in Toronto, Canada

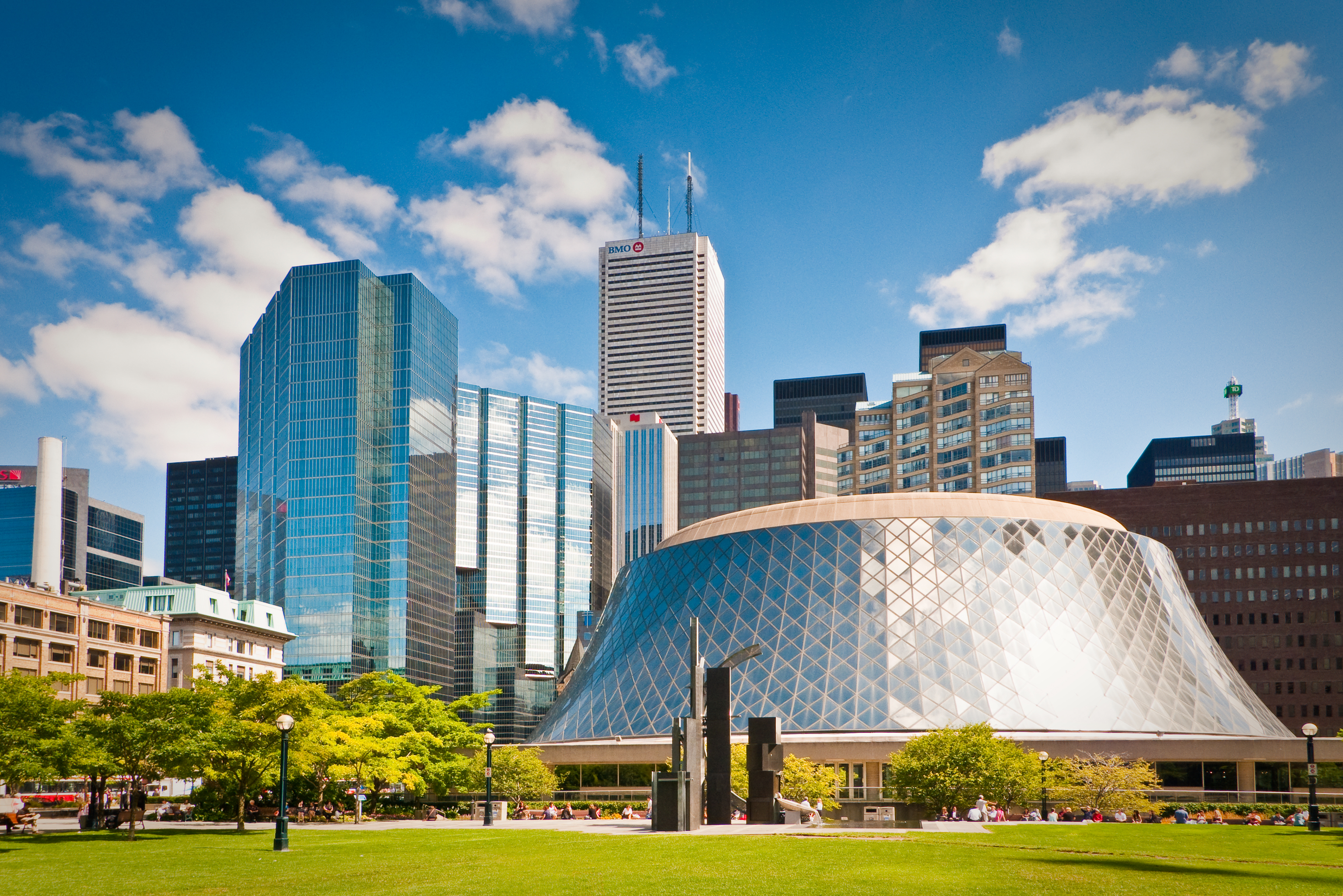
- Interactive map of Roy Thomson Hall
- Address: 60 Simcoe Street
- Location: Toronto, Ontario, Canada
- Coordinates: 43.646615°N 79.386443°W
- Owner: The Corporation of Massey Hall and Roy Thomson Hall
- Capacity: 2,630
- Public transit: St. Andrew

Construction
- Opened: September 13, 1982; 44 years ago
- Architect: Arthur Erickson

Tenants
- Toronto Symphony Orchestra; Toronto Defiant (OWL)

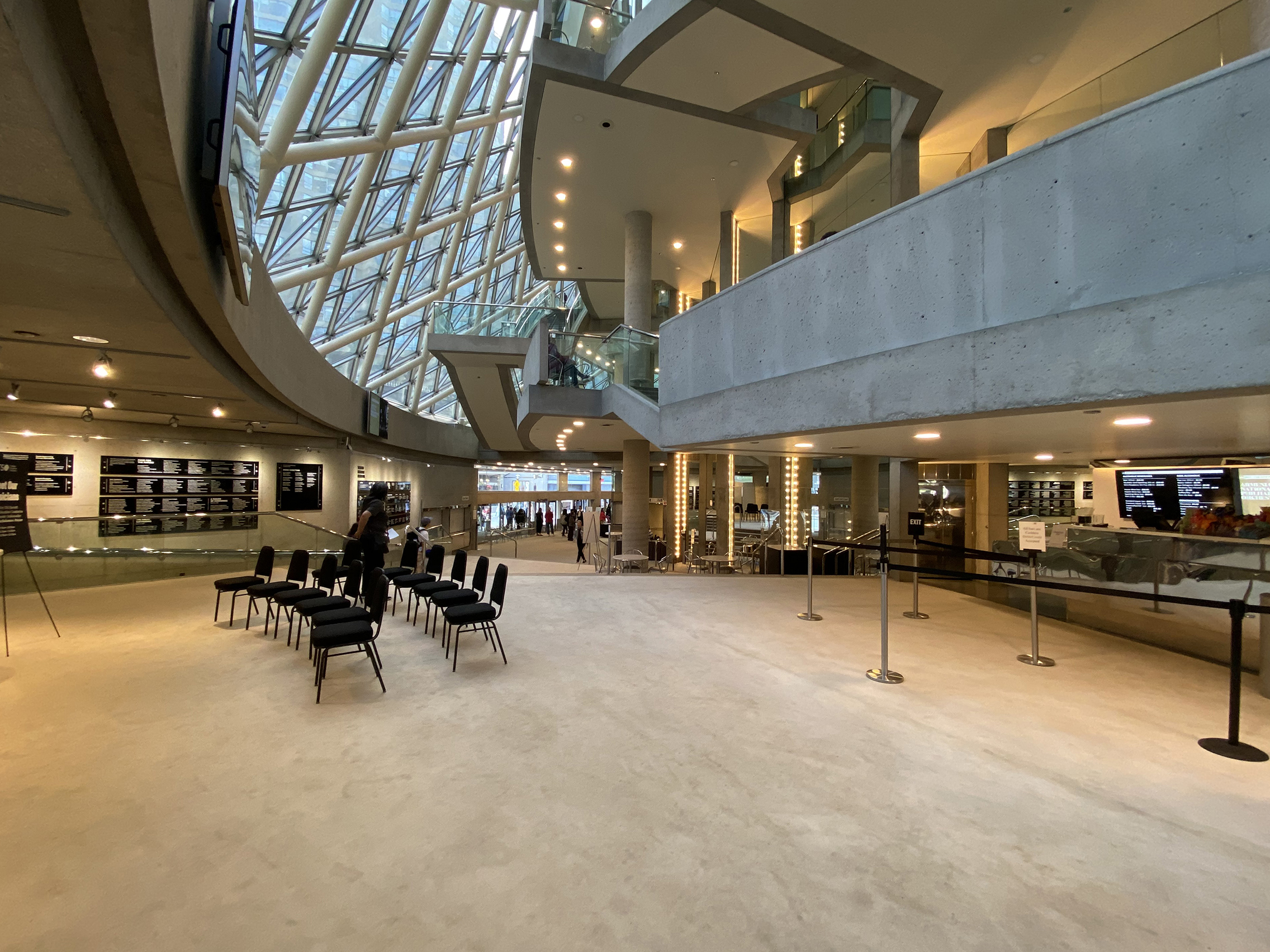
Lobby

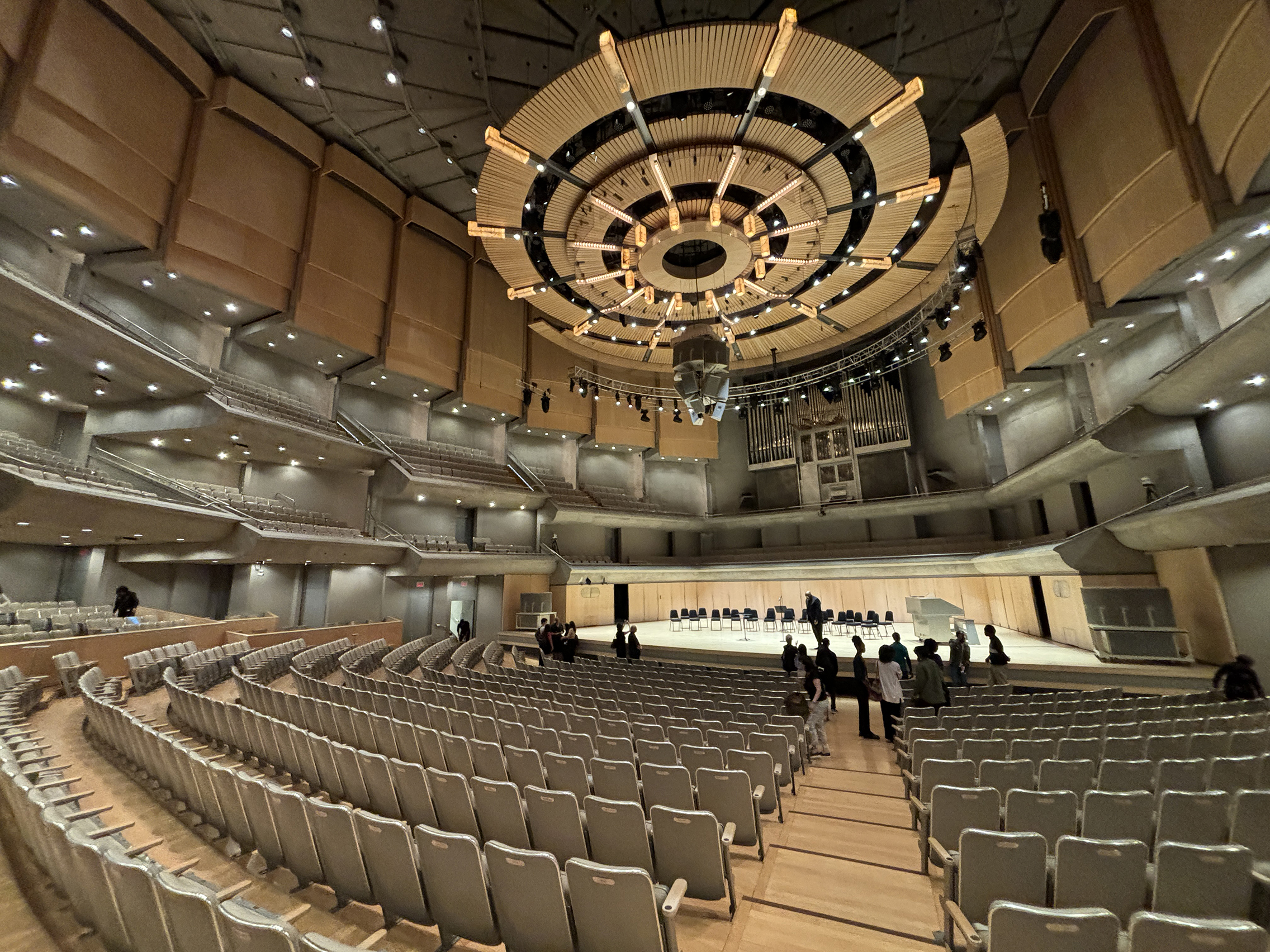
The hall

Roy Thomson Hall is a concert hall in Toronto, Ontario, Canada. Located downtown in the city's entertainment district, it is home to the Toronto Symphony Orchestra, the Toronto Mendelssohn Choir, and the esports team Toronto Defiant. Opened in 1982, its circular architectural design exhibits a sloping and curvilinear glass exterior. It was designed by Canadian architects Arthur Erickson and Mathers and Haldenby. Itzhak Perlman acted as a special advisor to the architects on accessibility needs for disabled performers and guests.

The hall seats 2,630 guests and features a pipe organ built by Canadian organ builder Gabriel Kney from London, Ontario.

The hall was formerly known as The New Massey Hall during its construction and pre-construction phase. It acquired its official name on January 14, 1982, as thanks to the family of Roy Thomson (first Lord Thomson of Fleet and founder of the publishing empire Thomson Corporation), who had donated C$4.5 million to complete the fundraising efforts for the new hall.

The hall was renovated over a period of six months in 2002, after years of complaints from musicians about the quality of its acoustics.

Filmmaker Jeffery Klassen's 2005 film Toronto Architecture interviews Arthur Erickson about the structure. Erickson speaks of the point of the grey structure being that of a container which people were to fill up with their own decorations. The pond was originally designed to be used as a skating rink in the winter. The building was influenced by Erickson's journeys in Japan and his relationship with the North American Aboriginals.

The hall is one of the main venues used by the Toronto International Film Festival, with many gala screenings held there each year including a festival-closing screening of the year's People's Choice Award winner. The concert hall was used in scenes of the 2000 film X-Men. The science fiction television series The Expanse uses it as the setting for the United Nations headquarters. The Amazon series The Boys also uses the hall as the bottom base for the otherwise digitally created superheroes' tower Vought Headquarters.

The hall was the venue of the state funeral of federal Leader of the Official Opposition and NDP leader Jack Layton on August 27, 2011.

== See also ==
- List of music venues in Toronto
