= Crystal Palace Barracks =

Coordinates: 42.99096°N 81.24834°W

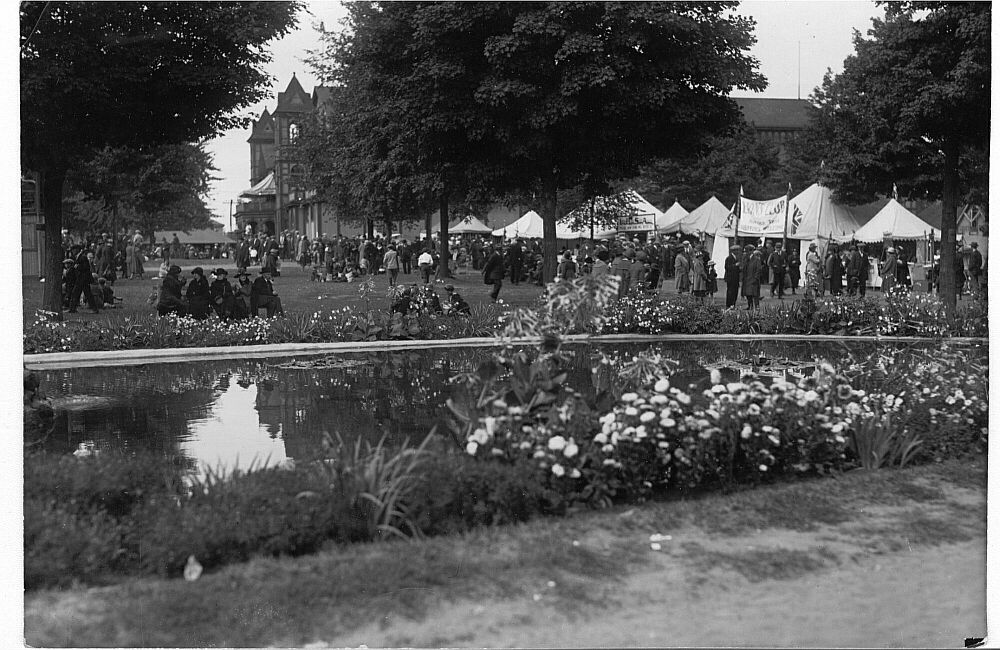
Western Fair Crystal Palace (seen from the pond) 1920

The Crystal Palace Barracks in London, Ontario, was the site of the Provincial Exhibition in 1861. The site was chosen at the north end of the military garrison grounds at Wellington Street and Central Avenue. In 1861, the military built an octagonal Crystal Palace, an eight sided white brick building containing eight doors, one on each side. Forty-eight windows sided the second floor of the building.

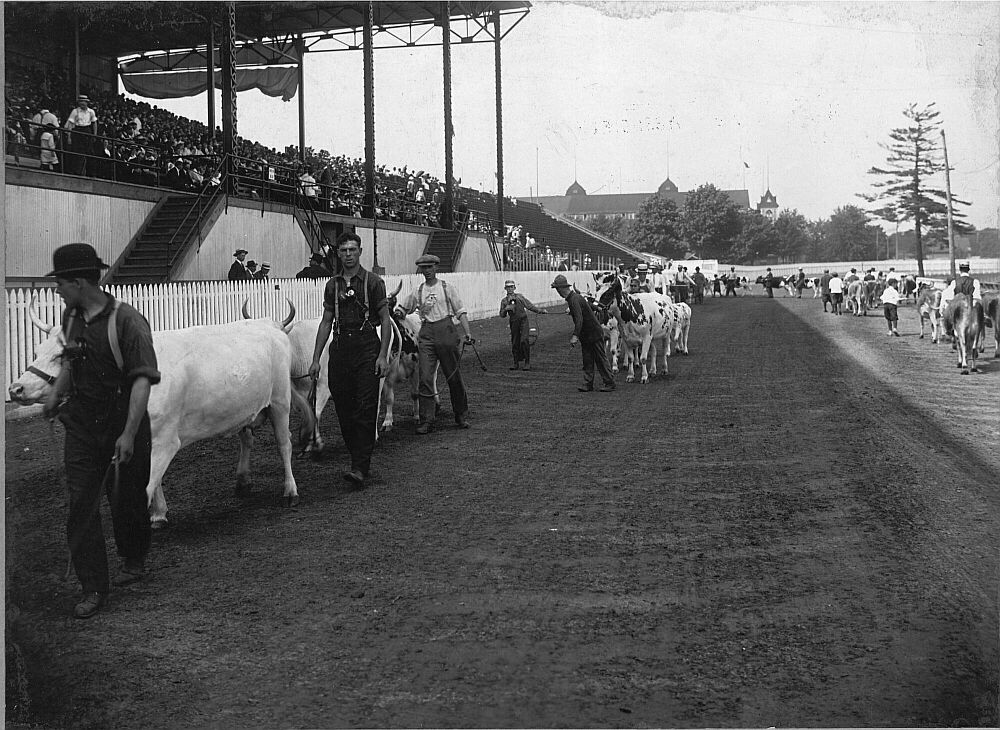
Western Fair Race Track circa 1923 Crystal Palace in background

In 1887, the Western Fair moved to its present location at Queen's Park. George F. Durand, in a competition, won the design for the new Main Exhibition Building, also known as the Crystal Palace. It borrowed many design features of Joseph Paxton's Crystal Palace in London, England. It featured thirteen high circular arches and massive windows. At the same time, the Fair Board authorized the construction of one half mile of race track.

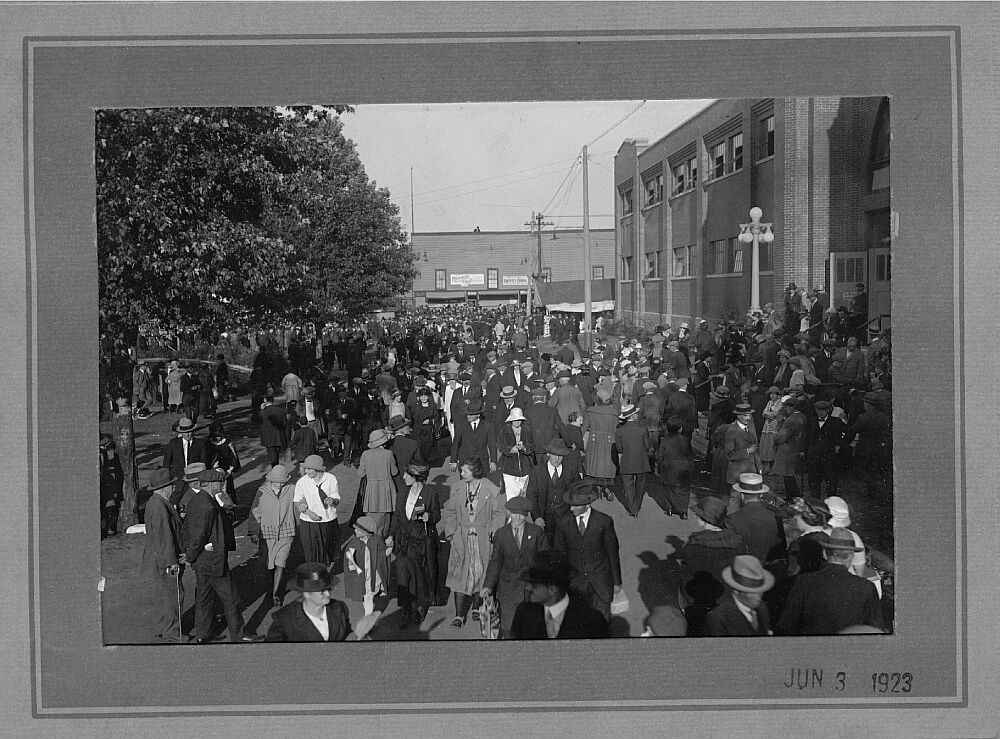
1923 Crystal Palace crowd

The Crystal Palace was painted in two shades of terra cotta and trimmed in green, brown, and red. The Fair Board felt the building symbolized industry and progress. The Western Fair Crystal Palace burned to the ground in January 1927. It was replaced with a red brick Confederation Building.

== See also ==
- Western Fair Museum and Archives
