= Gallery Stratford =

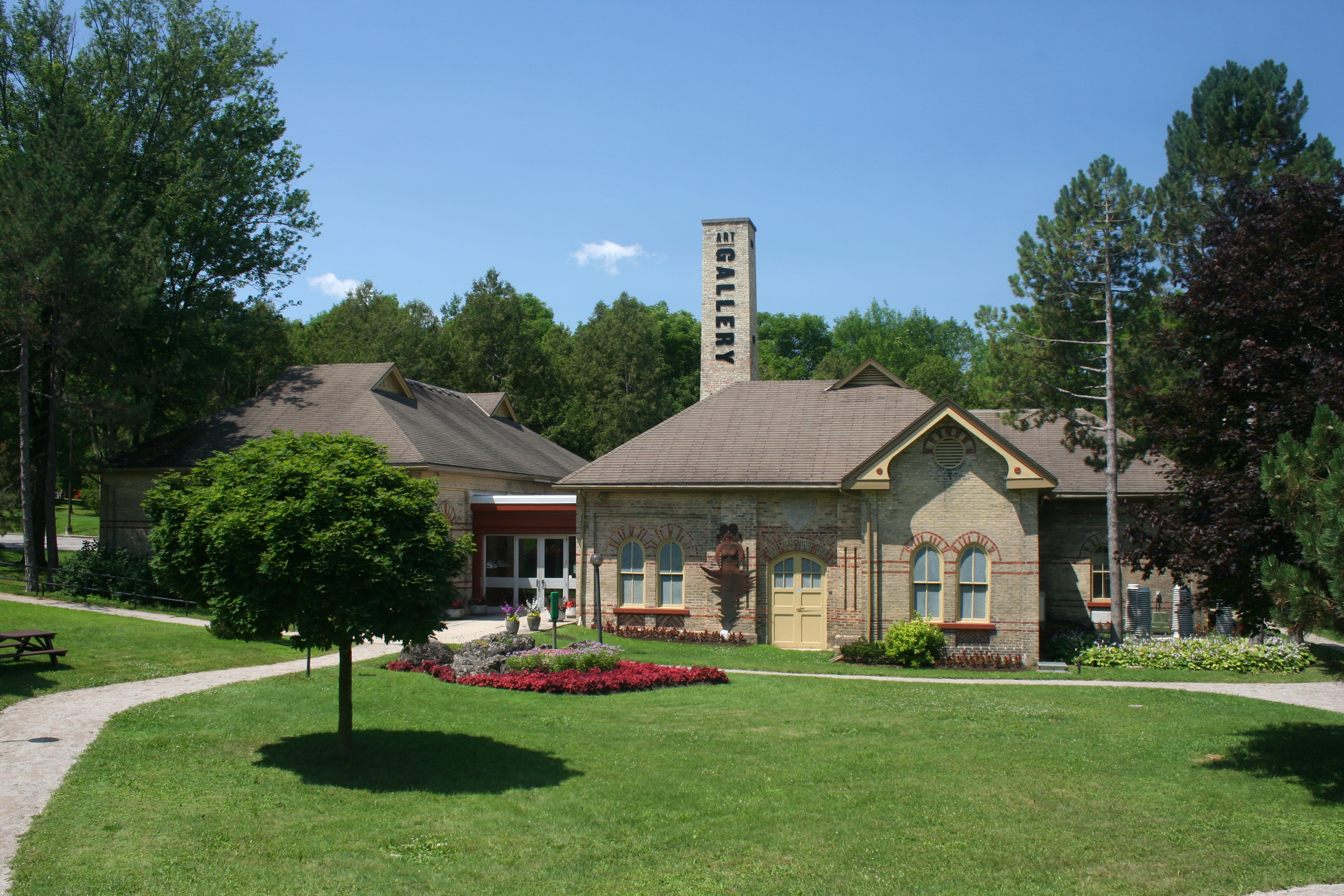
- Exterior of Gallery Stratford
- Established: 1967; 59 years ago
- Location: 54 Romeo Street South; Stratford, Ontario, Canada
- Coordinates: 43.37583°N 80.96351°W
- Type: Art museum
- Director: Robert Windrum
- Chairperson: Danielle Ingram
- Website: www.gallerystratford.on.ca

Gallery Stratford is a public art gallery in Stratford, Ontario, Canada. It was founded in 1967, organizing exhibitions of local, national, and international visual artists.

== History ==
Gallery Stratford is located in the former Stratford Pump House, designed by George F. Durand.

== Education ==
Gallery Stratford involves the community in its programming to facilitate visual arts awareness for adults and children. Programs change seasonally, with studio classes in a range of mediums such as oil painting, drawing and illustration, photography, and printmaking.

For students, class visits to Gallery Stratford are curriculum-based, aimed at encouraging students to find meaning in art and to think critically about artwork. Programs change regularly depending on the current exhibitions on display. Gallery Stratford's Arts Alive program offers drawing, photography, animation, painting, sculptures, collage projects etc.

== Scholarships ==
Annually, Gallery Stratford awards a scholarship to Perth Huron High School students who plan to study visual arts after high school. The Ela Moll Scholarship was founded by members of the Stratford Community and the Stratford Art Association to commemorate the death of Ela Moll (1950–1969). The scholarship aims to ensure that Stratford area youth remain interested in the arts.

== See also ==
- List of art museums
- List of museums in Ontario
