= Grand Opera House (London, Ontario) =

Masonic Temple and opera house, 1880–1900

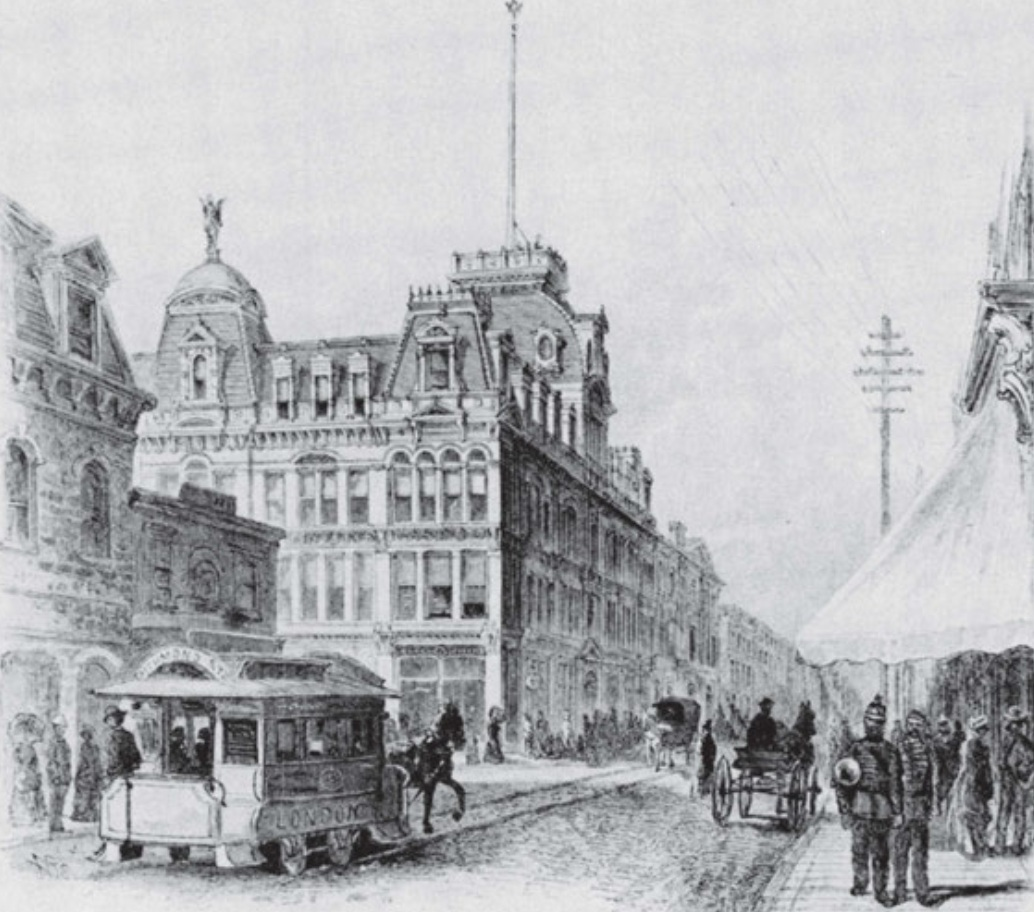
- The Grand Opera House in an 1882 lithograph
- Interactive map of Grand Opera House
- Full name: Masonic Temple and Grand Opera House
- Address: London, Ontario; Canada
- Coordinates: 42°58′58″N 81°14′56″W
- Capacity: 1,228

Construction
- Groundbreaking: 1880
- Opened: September 8, 1881
- Demolished: 1900
- Architect: George F. Durand; Thomas Henry Tracy

The Masonic Temple and Grand Opera House, also known simply as the Grand Opera House, was a Masonic Temple and opera house in London, Ontario, Canada. Designed by George F. Durand and Thomas Henry Tracy based on French influences, the building was completed between 1880 and 1881 to meet the needs of the city's growing Freemason community while also providing an entertainment venue. The 1,228-seat opera house hosted performances of operas, stage plays, and minstrel shows, and was noted for its lavish design. The red-brick building was trimmed in iron and stone, and adorned with carvings of artists, local politicians, Queen Victoria, and Prince Edward. It was destroyed by fire in 1900, with the Grand Theatre built as its replacement.

== Description ==
The Grand Opera House was located at the northwest corner of Richmond and King streets in London, Ontario. The building measured 142 by 110 feet (43 by 34 m). It had French influences, with the style described variously as French Renaissance and Second Empire. The façades featured varied window configurations; the corner pavilion, for instance, included four-window configurations on the third storey, three-window configurations on the second, and two-window configurations on the first. The building was completed in pressed red brick from Hamilton and trimmed in stone and iron. It was topped with a dormered attic.

On the building's western end was a three-storey opera house. Separate entrances on King Street provided access to the lower floor and the galleries. The building was ornamented with several symbols of the arts, broadly defined. These included a sculpture of a Muse atop the roof, as well as carvings of Gioachino Rossini and George Frideric Handel to represent music, William Shakespeare and Molière for literature, Christopher Columbus and Jacques Cartier for discovery, and Benjamin Franklin and George Stephenson for invention. Further reliefs included the London politicians David Mills and Francis Baxter Leys, schoolmaster Nicholas Wilson, Queen Victoria, and Prince Edward—the Grand Master of the Masonic Order in England.

Inside the opera house, lavish furnishings were provided. The building was described by the London Free Press as a "perfect little palace", with gilded railings, frescoed walls and ceilings, gaslit chandelier, and electric sidelights. The theatre itself space measured 60 feet (18 m) wide, 65 feet (20 m) long, and 40 feet (12 m) high, with a proscenium measuring 28 by 30 feet (8.5 by 9.1 m). Audiences sat on folding chairs, which had hooks underneath for hats, and were arranged on three levels. On the main level, seats in the parquet sat atop 12-inch (300 mm) risers, while those higher up were on 8-inch (200 mm) risers. More seating was available in two galleries.

Meanwhile, the eastern end of the building contained various offices, with the third and fourth storeys dedicated to the activities of London's Freemasons. These included a banquet hall, a drill hall for the Knights Templar, and offices, all of which were furnished with imported carpeting and draperies. These offices were accessed through the Richmond Street entrance, a 10-foot (3.0 m) portal carved with Masonic emblems.

== History ==
Freemasons were active in London from the 1820s. For more than five decades, members met in rented spaces, ranging from attics to hotel dining rooms. In 1880, after a boom in membership, the city's Freemasons commissioned George F. Durand and Thomas Henry Tracy to build a new dedicated space for meetings. Both men were Freemasons, with Tracy having served as the master of St. John's Lodge 209a from 1876 to 1877. A budget of CA$100,000 (equivalent to $3,436,000 in 2025) was proposed. Incorporated into the resulting design was a 1,228 seat opera house, almost twice the capacity of the Music Hall, a wooden theatre at the corner of York and Richmond streets that had been completed in 1866. The theatre historian Robert Fairfield describes the Grand Opera House as London's first proper theatre. Preparations included the painting of various backdrops for performances, which was contracted to a firm based in Detroit, Michigan.

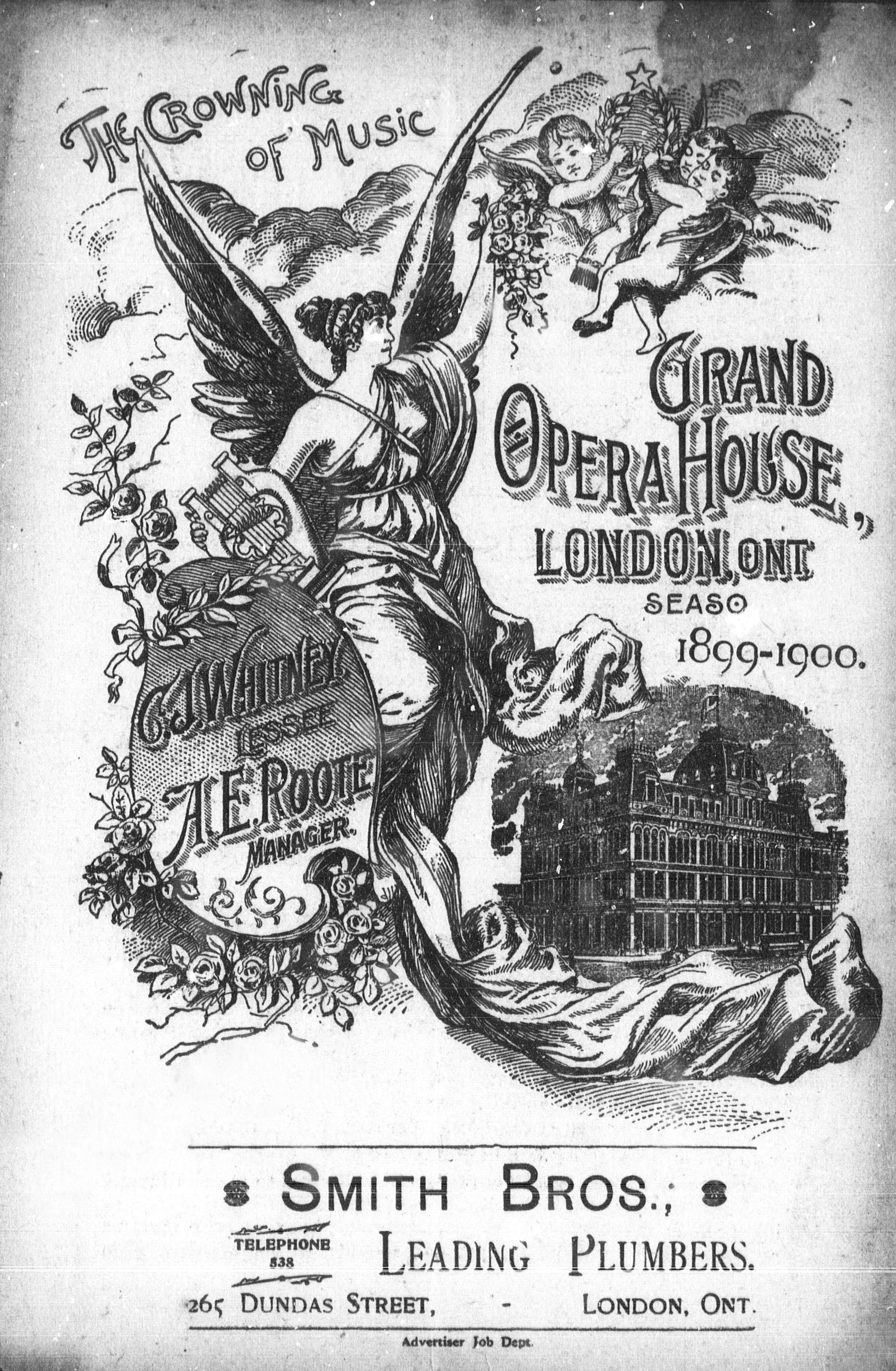
Programme for the 1899–1900 season

The Grand Opera House officially opened on September 8, 1881. Performances held at the venue included the melodrama Felicia, starring Rose Eytinge, as well as Alexandre Dumas fils's The Lady of the Camellias and Arthur Sullivan and W. S. Gilbert's Patience. Several works by Shakespeare were staged, including Richard III starring Thomas W. Keene and Hamlet and Romeo and Juliet starring Ernesto Rossi; in the latter two shows, Rossi performed in Italian while his co-stars spoke English. Other entertainment included minstrel shows and a phrenology talk by Orson Squire Fowler. The Grand Opera House later became part of the theatre chain operated by Clark James Whitney, a Detroit-based entrepreneur who had previously been the impresario for the Music Hall.

On February 23, 1900, a fire broke out in the bill-posting room. Despite fireproofing measures implemented during construction, the fire spread, and the Grand Opera House was gutted. Whitney worked with Ambrose Joseph Small to build the Grand Theatre as a replacement; the single-storey theatre was completed in 1901 and is located at 471 Richmond Street. A new, larger, building was completed at the Grand Opera House site, though this was demolished in 1968. Bas-relief portraits from the Grand Opera House survived at the Guild Inn in Toronto as late as 1986.

== Works cited ==
- Fairfield, Robert (1990). "Theatres and Performance Halls". In Saddlemyer, Anne (ed.). Early Stages: Theatre in Ontario 1800–1914. Toronto: University of Toronto Press. pp. 214–271. ISBN 978-1-4875-8672-0.
- "Grand Theatre". Canada's Historic Places. Parks Canada. Archived from the original on July 6, 2026.
- History of the County of Middlesex, Canada. Toronto and London: W. A. & C. L. Goodspeed. 1889.
- Tausky, Nancy Z.; Distefano, Lynne D. (2018). Victorian Architecture in London and Southwestern Ontario: Symbols of Aspiration. Toronto: University of Toronto Press. ISBN 978-1-4875-8257-9. JSTOR 10.3138/j.ctvfrxbbj.
