= George F. Durand =

Canadian architect (1850–1889)

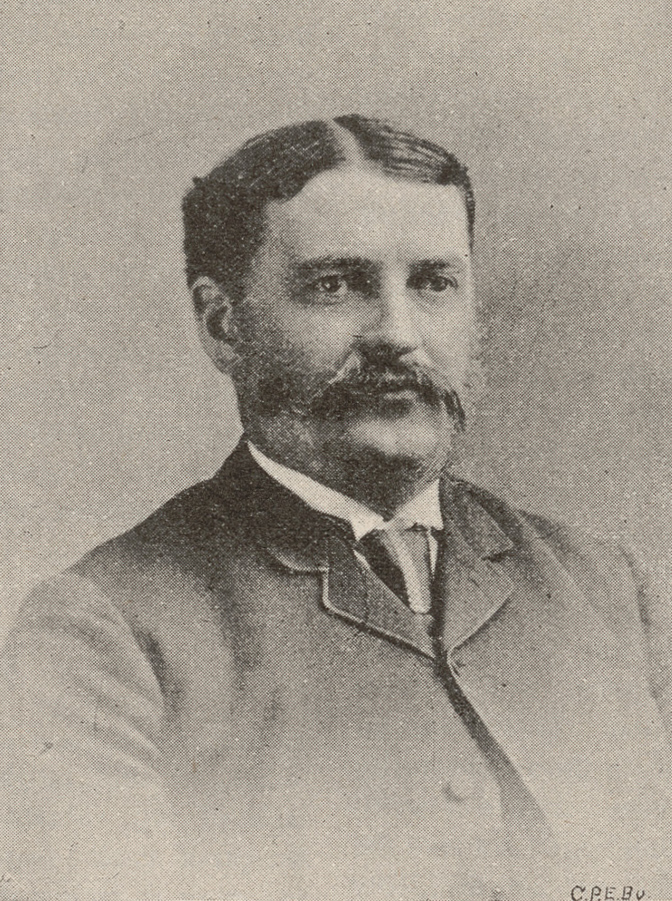
- Born: George Ferguson Durand; July 9, 1850; London, Canada West
- Died: December 20, 1889 (aged 39); London, Ontario, Canada
- Occupation: Architect
- Years active: 1860s–1889
- Notable work: Crystal Palace; London East Town Hall; Masonic Temple and Grand Opera House; Perth County Courthouse; Stratford Pump House; Talbot Street Baptist Church; Victoria Hall; Waverly; Wolseley Barracks ("A" Block)

George Ferguson Durand (July 9, 1850 – December 20, 1889) was a Canadian architect. Born in London, Canada West (now Ontario), to a Scottish immigrant, he showed an interest in the arts from a young age. He apprenticed under William Robinson before working with Thomas Fuller on the Parliament Buildings in Ottawa and the New York State Capitol in Albany, New York. Returning to London by 1878, he joined Robinson, Tracy, & Company as a junior partner, being made partner in 1880; with the departure of Thomas Henry Tracy in 1882, Durand became the lead architect for the firm. He received many commissions in London and throughout Southwestern Ontario, including several from the federal government, and helped establish the Ontario Association of Architects in 1889.

Durand designed many houses, post offices, and municipal buildings, including the Stratford Pump House and Perth County Courthouse in Stratford, Talbot Street Baptist Church and Waverly in London, and Victoria Hall in Petrolia. His works employ varied styles, reflecting an eclecticism common in contemporary architecture, though features of Queen Anne style architecture are prominent in many of his buildings. Several of his designs have been designated under the Ontario Heritage Act. The "A" Block of the Wolseley Barracks and Victoria Hall were made National Historic Sites of Canada in 1963 and 1975, respectively.

== Biography ==
=== Early life and career ===
Durand was born in London, Canada West (now Ontario), on July 9, 1850. He was the eldest son of James Durand, a builder from Thurso, Scotland, who established Wright and Durand with John Wright in 1854. (Note: James Durand also dabbled in politics, serving as a city councillor (The Independent 2024, p. 9). Representing the Liberal Party, he contested the 1867 Ontario general election against John Carling (London and Its Men of Affairs 1915, p. 116).) Showing an interest in the arts from his youth, George Durand was sent to study under the drawing instructor J. R. Peel in 1864. Later in the 1860s, he was apprenticed to William Robinson; a former student of the architect Thomas Young, Robinson was working as the city engineer for London.

During the construction of the Parliament Buildings in Ottawa, Durand served as an assistant to architect Thomas Fuller. He later followed Fuller to New York, where he and Augustus Laver were working on the new state capitol in Albany. He was joined by Thomas Henry Tracy, another Robinson apprentice. The capitol faced heavy criticism for its cost and contracting to a non-American builder, and Fuller was dismissed in 1876. Durand, though lauded by Commissioner W.A. Rice for his skill and integrity, also left the project.

After a year in Maine working at a granite works, Durand returned to London in 1878. Following a brief stint at the Globe Iron Works, he rejoined William Robinson and Thomas Tracy to become a junior partner at Robinson, Tracy, & Company. The firm used iron tie rods as reinforcements for wooden girders, and Durand employed wrought-iron beams for an 1880 skating rink. Other works completed as a junior partner included a Roman Catholic church in Ingersoll as well as the Federal Bank and the Charles Murray House in London.

=== Durand and Company ===
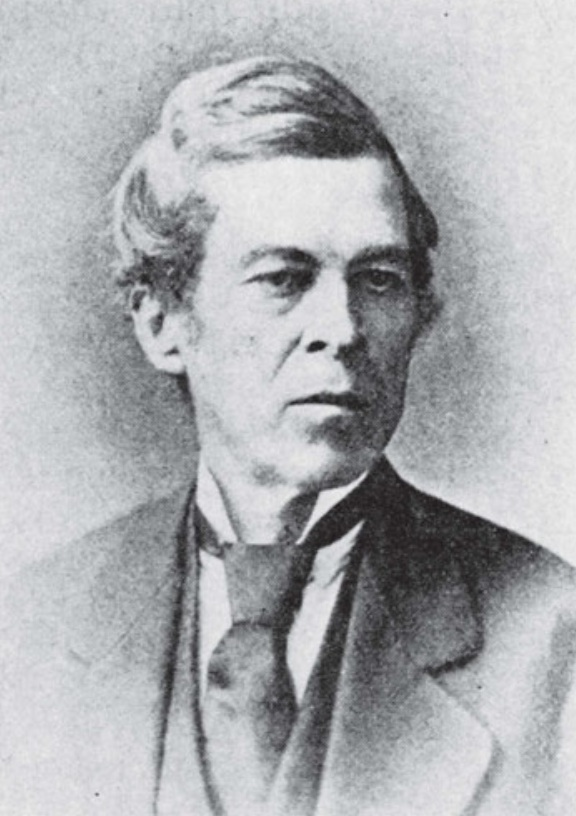
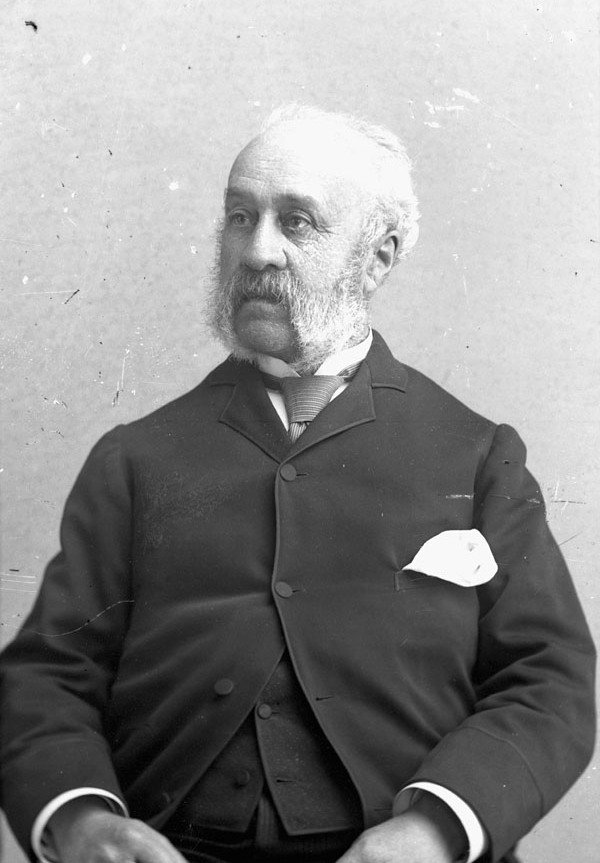
Durand apprenticed under William Robinson (left), worked for Thomas Fuller (right), then returned to London to work for Robinson

Durand was made partner in 1880, after Robinson's retirement. He collaborated with Tracy on several projects, completing the St. George's Anglican Church in Walton, and designing the Palmyra Baptist Church in Palmyra; the latter, funded in part by Minister of Justice David Mills, combined the then-popular High Victorian Gothic with the semicircular arches of the Romanesque style. In London, Durand and Tracy prepared a new separate school model and completed the Talbot Street Baptist Church, a 920-capacity building with prominent pinnacles and a bell-cote. The men, both Freemasons, collaborated on the Masonic Temple and Grand Opera House (1880–1881), a four-storey multifunctional building that occupied 43 by 34 metres (142 ft × 110 ft) on one of the city's main intersections. (Note: Tracy had served as the master of St. John's Lodge 209a in 1876–1877 and Durand later led Tuscan Lodge 195 in 1886 (Tausky & Distefano 2018, p. 207; History of the County of Middlesex, Canada 1889, p. 341).)

With Tracy's departure for a full-time city engineer position in 1882, Durand became the firm's sole architect. During this period, Southwestern Ontario experienced a building boom, and Durand reported aggregate tenders of CA$250,000 in 1882. (Note: This is equivalent to $7,338,000 in 2025.) That year, he completed the London Club, a men's club of which he was a member; the construction was handled by his brother Andrew. He also worked on the Waverly for Charles Goodhue, a CA$25,000 (Note: This is equivalent to $734,000 in 2025.) mansion for John Labatt, the Stratford Pump House (now Gallery Stratford), as well as the London East Town Hall (now Aeolian Hall). The commission for the latter two was likely obtained by Durand's employee John Mackenzie Moore, with Durand consulting on the design. Building had slowed by 1884, though Durand remained busy, designing a clock tower and an addition to the Custom House in 1884. Most of Durand's work during the mid-1880s was outside London.

Durand remained busy through the late 1880s. He received several government contracts through Fuller, who had been appointed Chief Architect of the Dominion of Canada in 1881. These included post offices in Strathroy and Goderich, as well as the Infantry School (now Wolseley Barracks, "A" Block) in London. In 1887, he designed an expansion, including a chancel and pulpit, for St. Andrew's Presbyterian Church, also in London, and won a competition to build a new Crystal Palace for the Western Fair. Unlike the original design, produced by Robinson for the fair's original site, Durand modelled his exhibition hall after its namesake in London, England, which had been produced by Joseph Paxton in 1854. Elsewhere, he was commissioned to design the Perth County Courthouse in Stratford, replacing an earlier design by Peter Ferguson, as well as Victoria Hall in Petrolia, a combined town hall and opera house. Smaller projects in Petrolia included the Masonic Temple, St. Philip's Catholic Church, and St. Andrew's Presbyterian Church.

In 1888, Durand was contracted by Minister of Education George William Ross to design a new building for Upper Canada College in Toronto. He completed the school after touring similar projects in the Eastern United States. This was his last commissioned structure, and was completed after his death. (Note: The Upper Canada College was completed in 1891, with Kivas Tully and Fred Henry attached to the project at different times (Tausky & Distefano 2018, p. 339).) He also submitted a design for the York County Courthouse in Toronto that year, winning second place. In 1889, he chaired a meeting which led to the establishment of the Ontario Association of Architects and was elected its second vice-president. (Note: At the time of its establishment, the Ontario Association of Architects was headed by a president, who was supported by three vice-presidents: the first vice-president, second vice-president, and third vice-president (The Canadian Architect and Builder 1889, p. 40).) By this point, his firm employed an average of three to five men, though turnover rates were high. Durand was frequently away from the office, concentrating on promotional and supervisory activities, though he remained involved in the training of his apprentices.

=== Death ===
Beginning in March 1889, Durand became sickly. Contemporary daybooks record frequent absences, and on June 27 The London Free Press reported that he had taken a leave of absence to focus on his health; his apprentice Fred Henry took charge of everyday business operations. Despite some positive signs in August, Durand's condition was reported to be hopeless in December 1889. He died on December 20, with the cause reported by The Canadian Architect and Builder as overwork. His former partner Thomas Tracy was a pallbearer at his funeral, which was reported to have in attendance over two hundred Freemasons as well as guests from the United States and Ottawa. His estate was liquidated and the proceeds distributed to his widow, Sarah (née Parker), and their four children. In its obituary, the London Advertiser described Durand as "acknowledged to be the best designer in the Dominion."

== Style ==
Details of the Perth County Courthouse

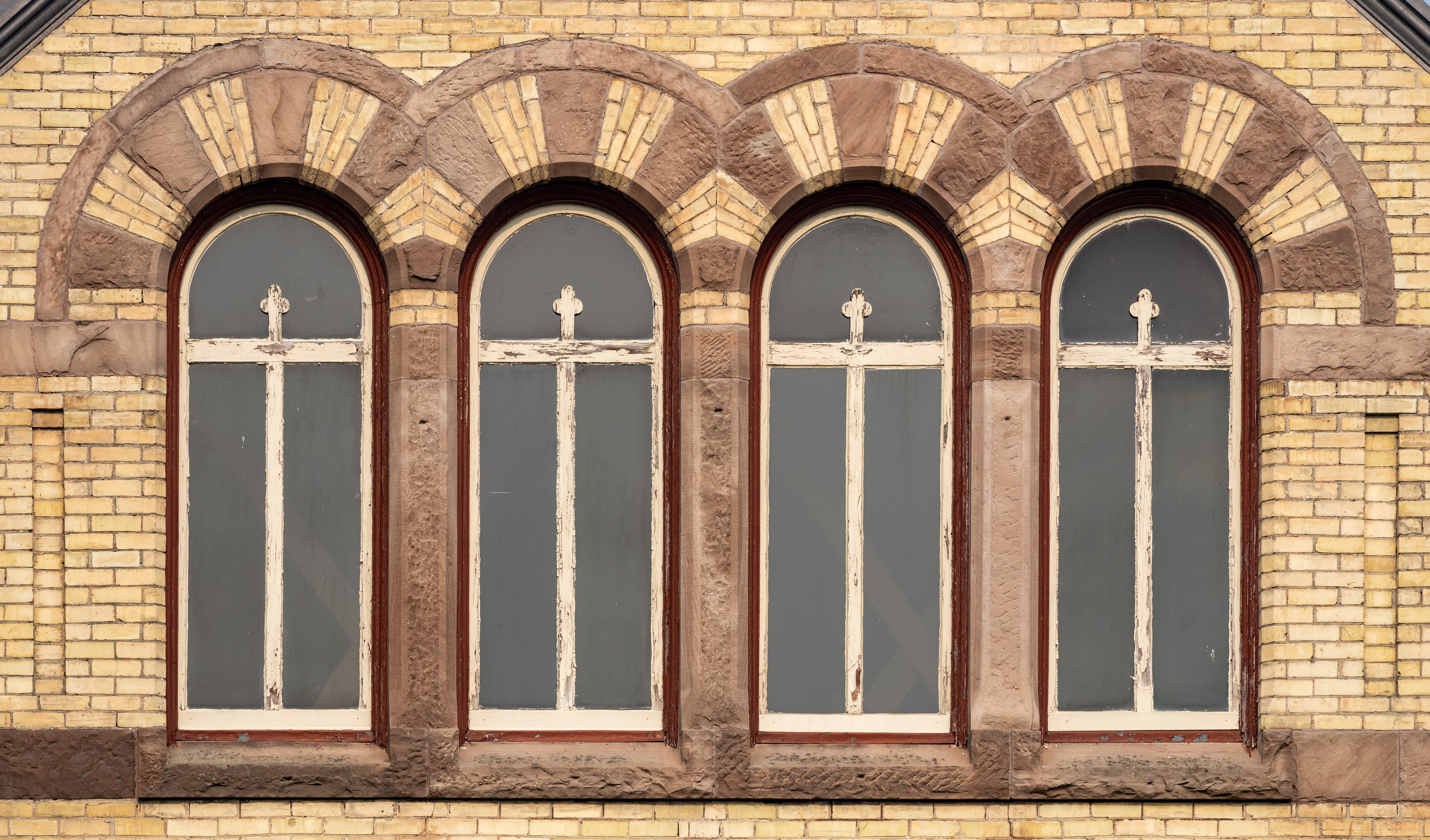
High arched windows and polychromatic masonry

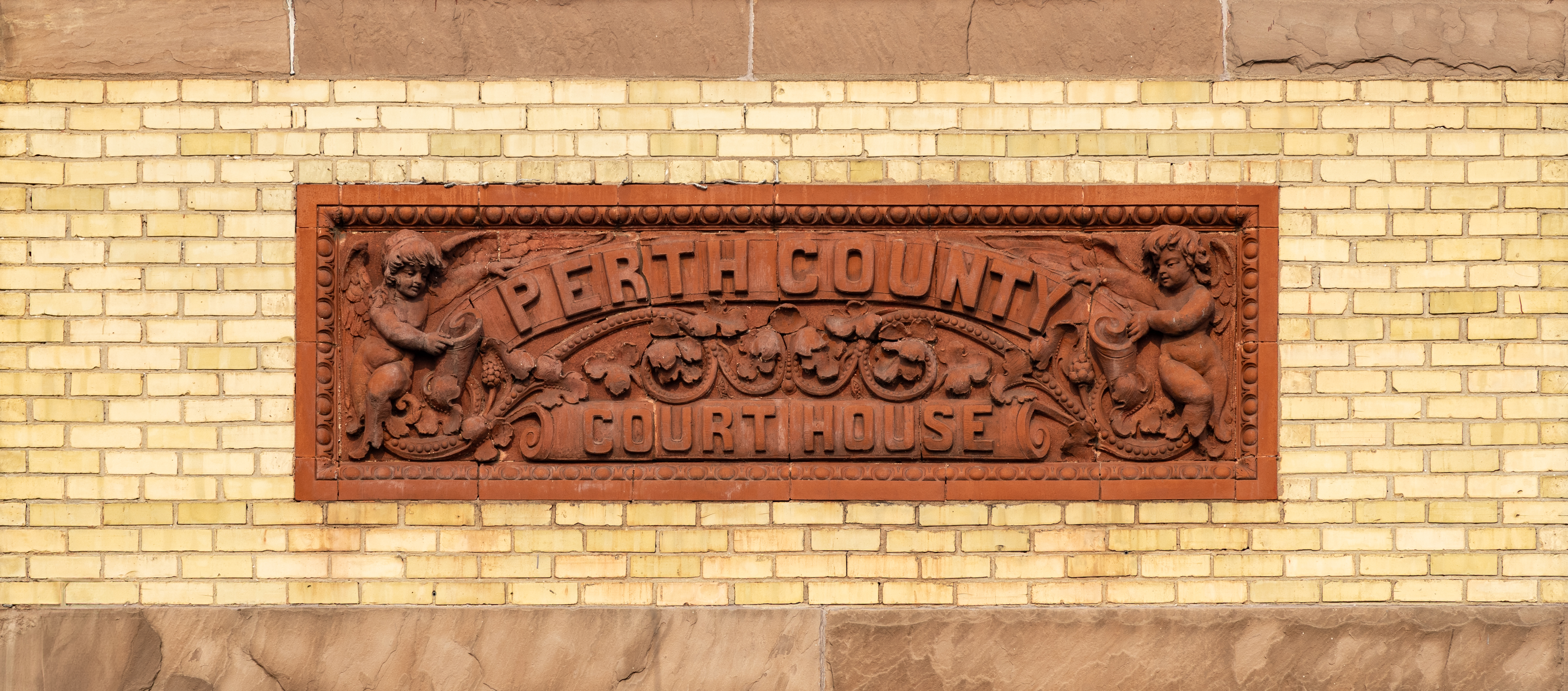
Polychromatic masonry and terra cotta relief

Durand supported the arts, being a member of the Art Union of London and joining the Royal Canadian Academy of Art in 1884 as an associate member. This, Nancy Z. Tausky and Lynne D. Distefano wrote in their survey of Victorian architecture in Southwestern Ontario, carried over into his approach to architecture. They describe Durand as "clearly anxious to be recognized and remembered as an architect-artist", noting that his signature adorns a terra cotta relief on the Perth County Courthouse, which he modelled before production, and that his library included several works on the philosophy of art. (Note: Conversely, Durand's partners focused more on the engineering aspects of architecture (Tausky 2005, p. 24).) Durand would frequently handle decorative details personally, and may have asserted control over the artistic direction of his office's output. Tausky and Distefano describe his perspective drawings as positioning works within "surroundings that are physically inviting and also suggest an attractive social world", and the City of London writes that he employed an "innovative and imaginative approach to design".

Together with his firm, Durand was prolific, being responsible for some 22 churches as well as many houses, civic structures, and commercial buildings. He experimented extensively with architectural styles, embracing an eclecticism that was common among his contemporaries. He would combine several styles in the same project, for instance using a combination of narrow Queen Anne-style windows with broader Romanesque ones on Victoria Hall. Durand had several consistent tendencies, preferring symmetry and balance in his facades, as well as what Tausky and Distefano describe as an orderliness that underpinned his sometimes playful and experimental designs. Durand frequently prioritized adornment over blank spaces, using his designs to emphasize lightness and verticality, such that the London Advertiser described the Federal Bank as "massive, without any appearance of heaviness".

Press coverage of Durand's projects used several terms, including French Renaissance for the Masonic Temple and Grand Opera House, Gothic for Waverly, and Romanesque for Upper Canada College. Writing retrospectively, Tausky and Distefano note that Durand's earliest buildings had stronger Italianate influences, whereas some of his last buildings (including the Upper Canada College) were influenced by the Romanesque approach advocated by Henry Hobson Richardson. Durand drew heavily from the Queen Anne style, both the British and American approaches, with polychromatic brickwork, moulded stone ornaments, and terra cotta panels in several projects. According to Marion MacRae and Anthony Adamson's study of courthouse and municipal architecture in Ontario, Durand was one of few contemporary architects in the province to use the Queen Anne style for non-domestic works.

== Legacy ==
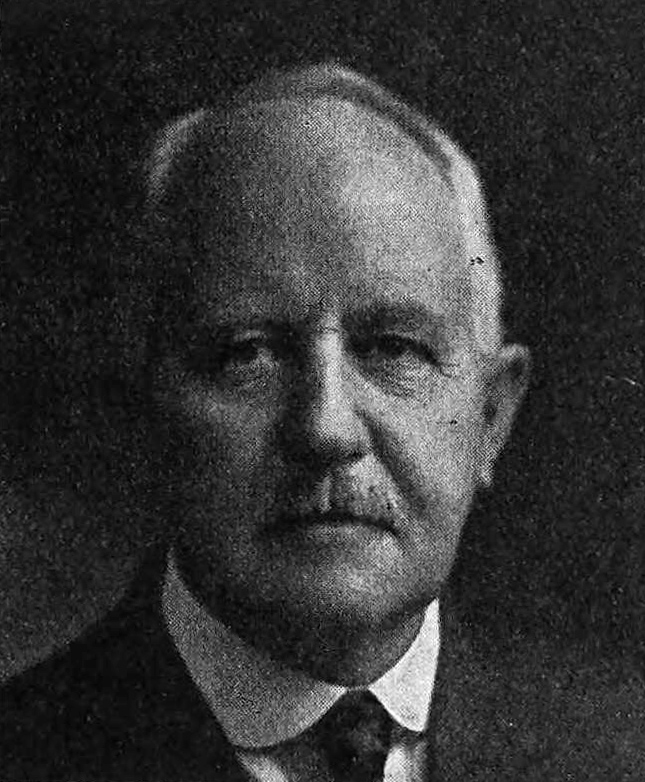
John Mackenzie Moore continued the firm through the 1920s.

After Durand's death, initial reports suggested that George Lloyd of Detroit, Michigan, would acquire his firm. Ultimately, although several projects were completed by Fred Henry, the firm was inherited by John Mackenzie Moore. Moore had worked for the firm previously, being made responsible for surveying and engineering through a gentlemen's agreement in 1884. Moore sued Durand in 1888 to seek a greater share of the profits, left, and returned in 1889, though arbitration remained ongoing at the time of Durand's death. The firm remained under Moore through the 1920s, though at times he worked with Fred Henry and J. Vicar Munro; under subsequent architects, it continued to operate into the 1990s. (Note: After John Moore's death in 1930, leadership of the firm was taken by his son Roy. Upon Roy Moore's retirement in 1958, the firm was led by Ronald E. Murphy; he continued to practice until his death in 1992, at which time the firm, then known as Murphy and Murphy, was taken over by his son David (Ontario Association of Architects).)

Durand amassed a large library, and followed developments in American and French architecture through his subscriptions to such periodicals as Inland Architect and Builder and Northwestern Architect and Improvement Record. Parts of the library have survived, and include many texts on art. These were donated, along with other early records of the firm established by William Robinson, to the University of Western Ontario in London by Ronald Murphy in the late 1960s. In 1978, an exhibition of Durand's architectural work was organized by Lynne Distefano at the London Historical Museums. The archives at the University of Western Ontario contain 341 architectural drawings spanning 62 different projects handled by Durand, either individually or with his partners.

Several of Durand's works have been designated under the Ontario Heritage Act. In London, the Henry Dunn House at 195 Elmwood Avenue East was designated in 1988; it was commissioned in 1885 by Henry Dunn for his daughter Elizabeth. Waverly, which has since been transformed into a retirement home, was designated in 1996. The former Talbot Street Baptist Church, operated by the First Christian Reformed Church since 1953, received designation in 2000, though its bell-cote and pinnacles have been removed. The former East London Town Hall, built between 1883 and 1884, was designated in 2004; having only served as a town hall until 1885, it has been a music hall since 1969. The Stratford Pump House, which received several additions as the town's water needs grew before being converted into an art gallery, was designated in 1985.

Other buildings by Durand have been designated National Historic Sites of Canada under the Historic Sites and Monuments Act. The "A" Block of the Wolseley Barracks, completed by Durand between 1886 and 1888 in conjunction with Henry James, was designated in 1963 as part of the Wolseley Barracks National Historic Site; the building also received independent federal designation as a Classified Federal Heritage Building in 1991. Parks Canada, responsible for the site, highlights its status as the Canadian government's "first purpose-built infantry training school" as well as its eclectic combination of contemporary architecture and military tradition. Victoria Hall in Petrolia, completed between 1887 and 1889, received designation in 1975. The interior was destroyed in a 1989 fire, after which the hall was rebuilt with a 316-square-metre (3,400 sq ft) addition.

== Selected works ==
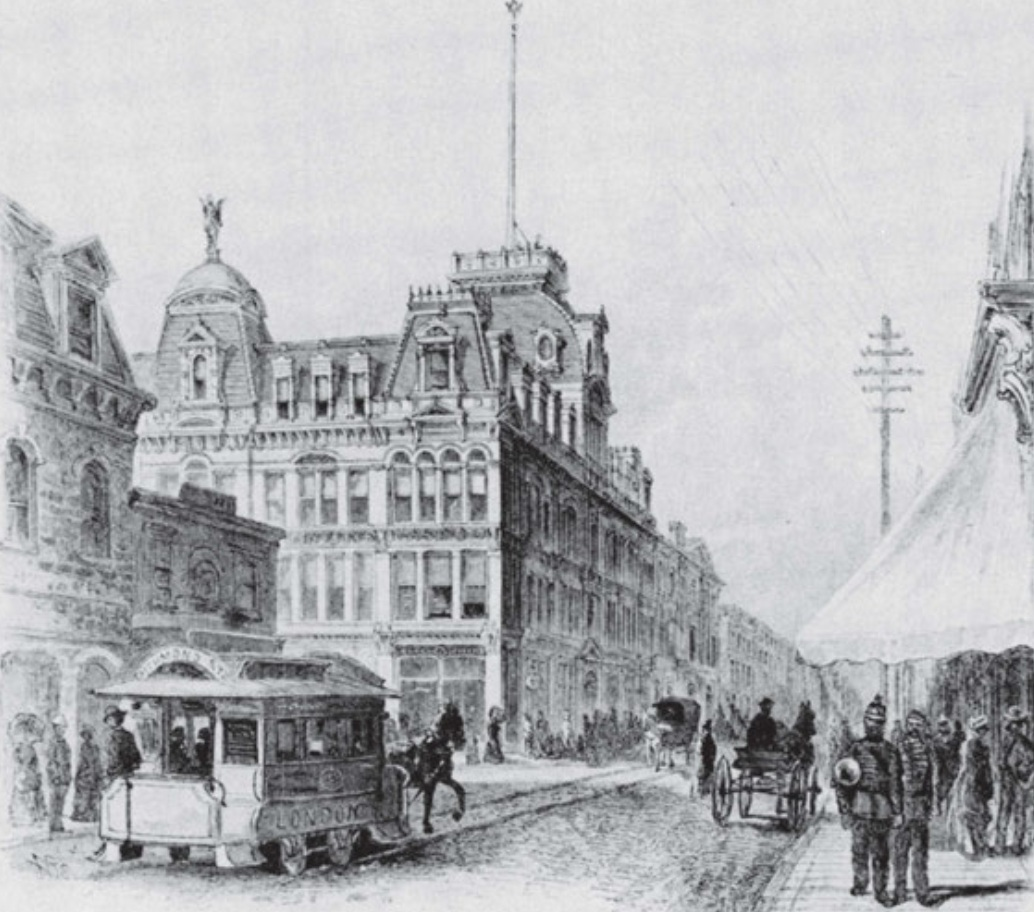
Masonic Temple and Grand Opera House (1880–1881, now demolished)

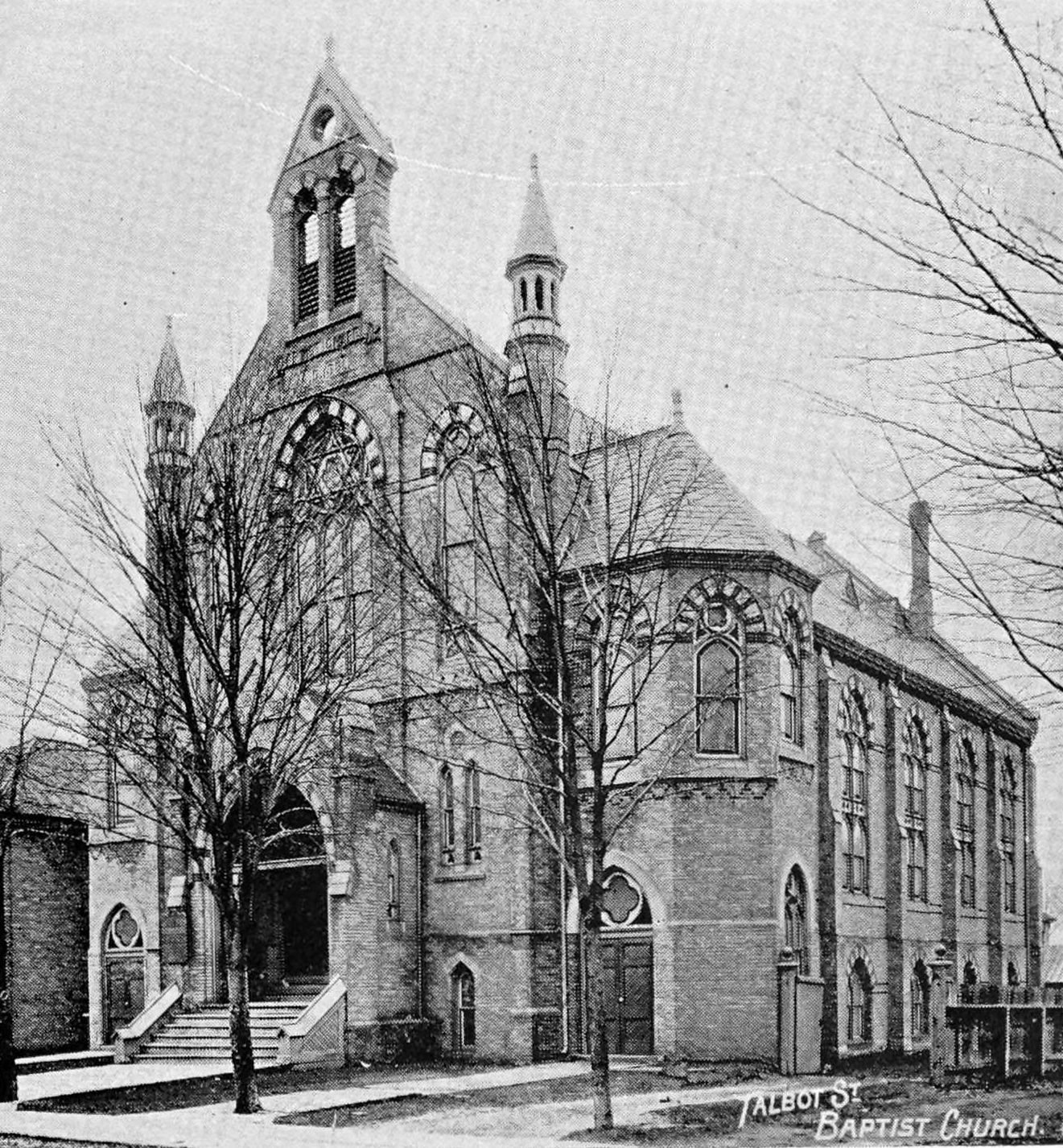
Talbot Street Baptist Church (1881–1882)

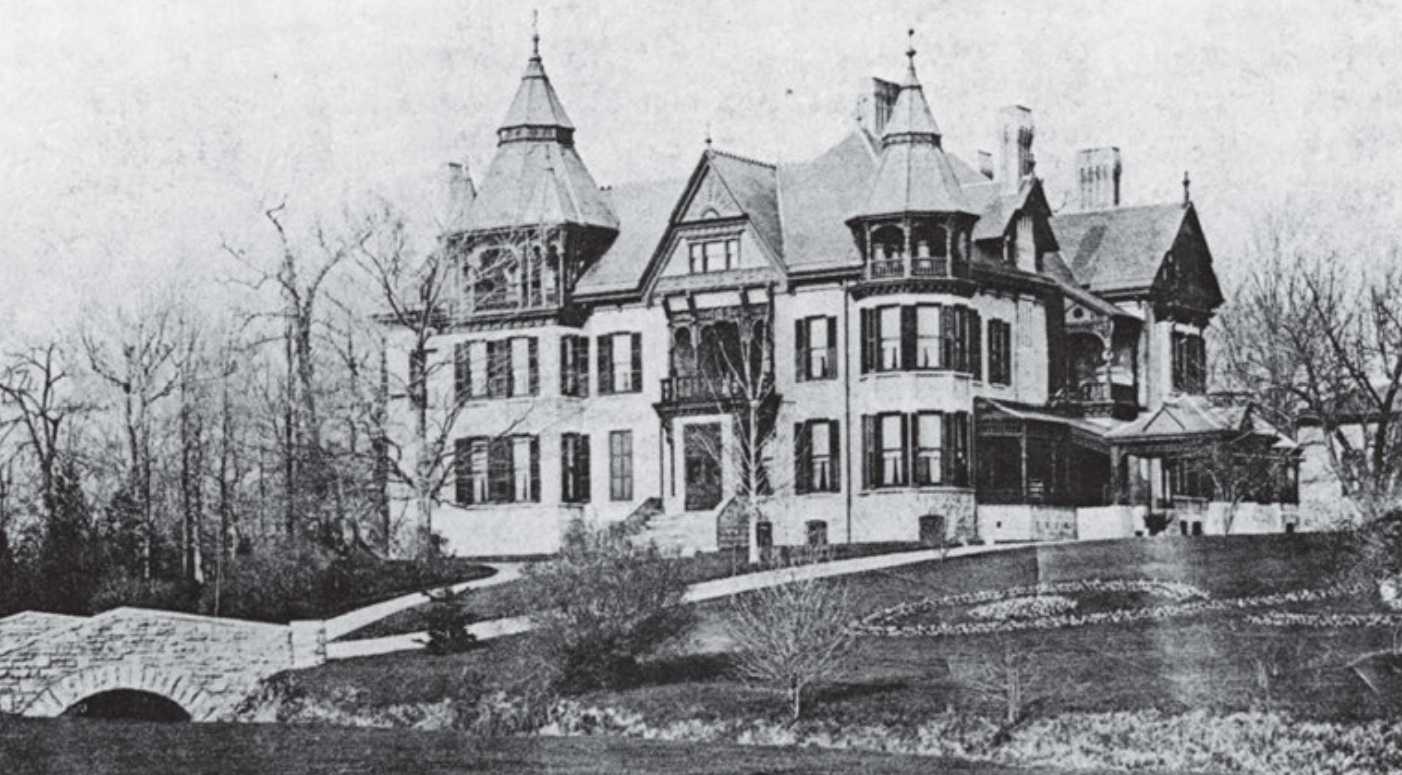
Waverly (1882, with later additions)

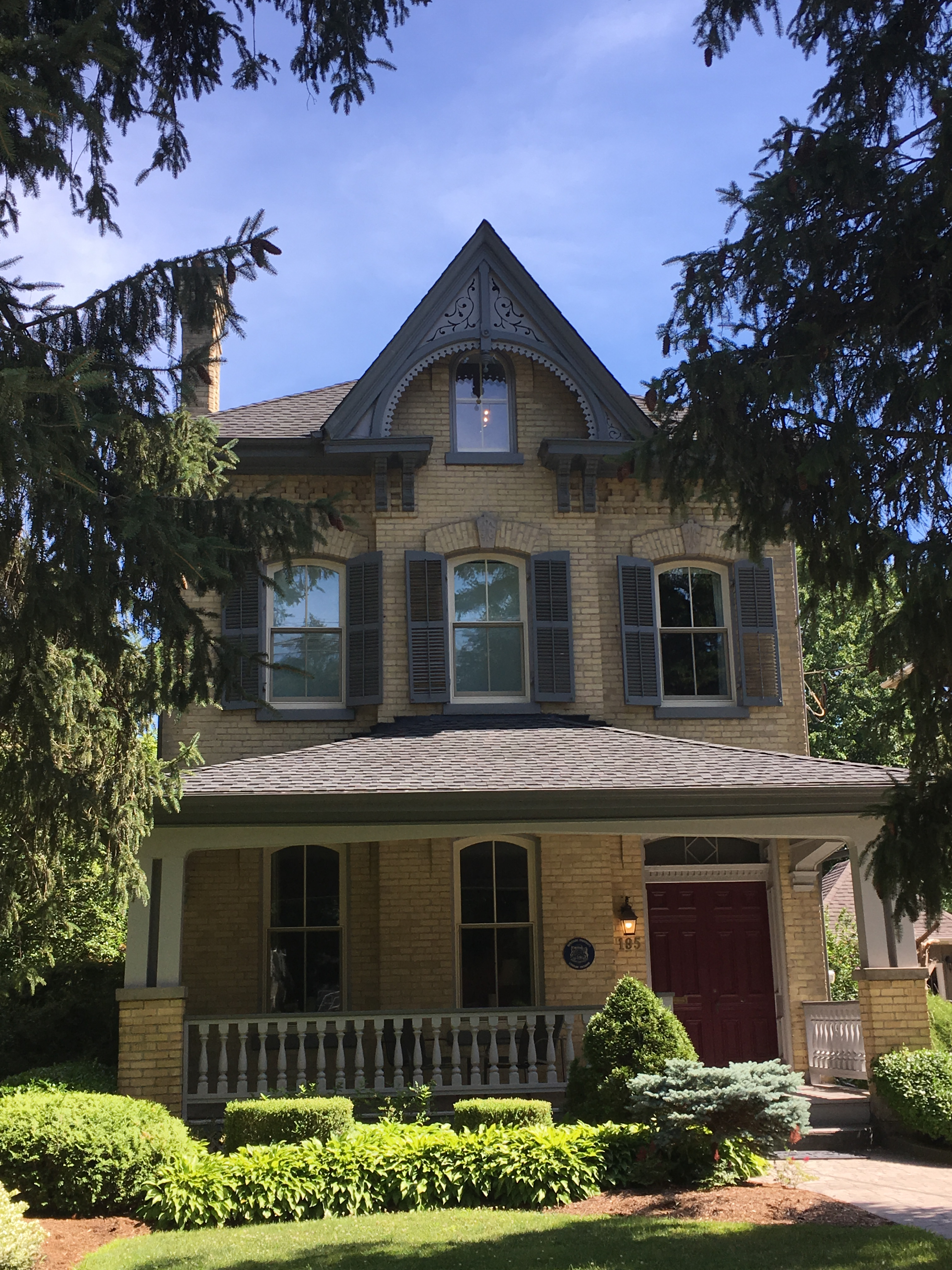
Henry Dunn House (1885)

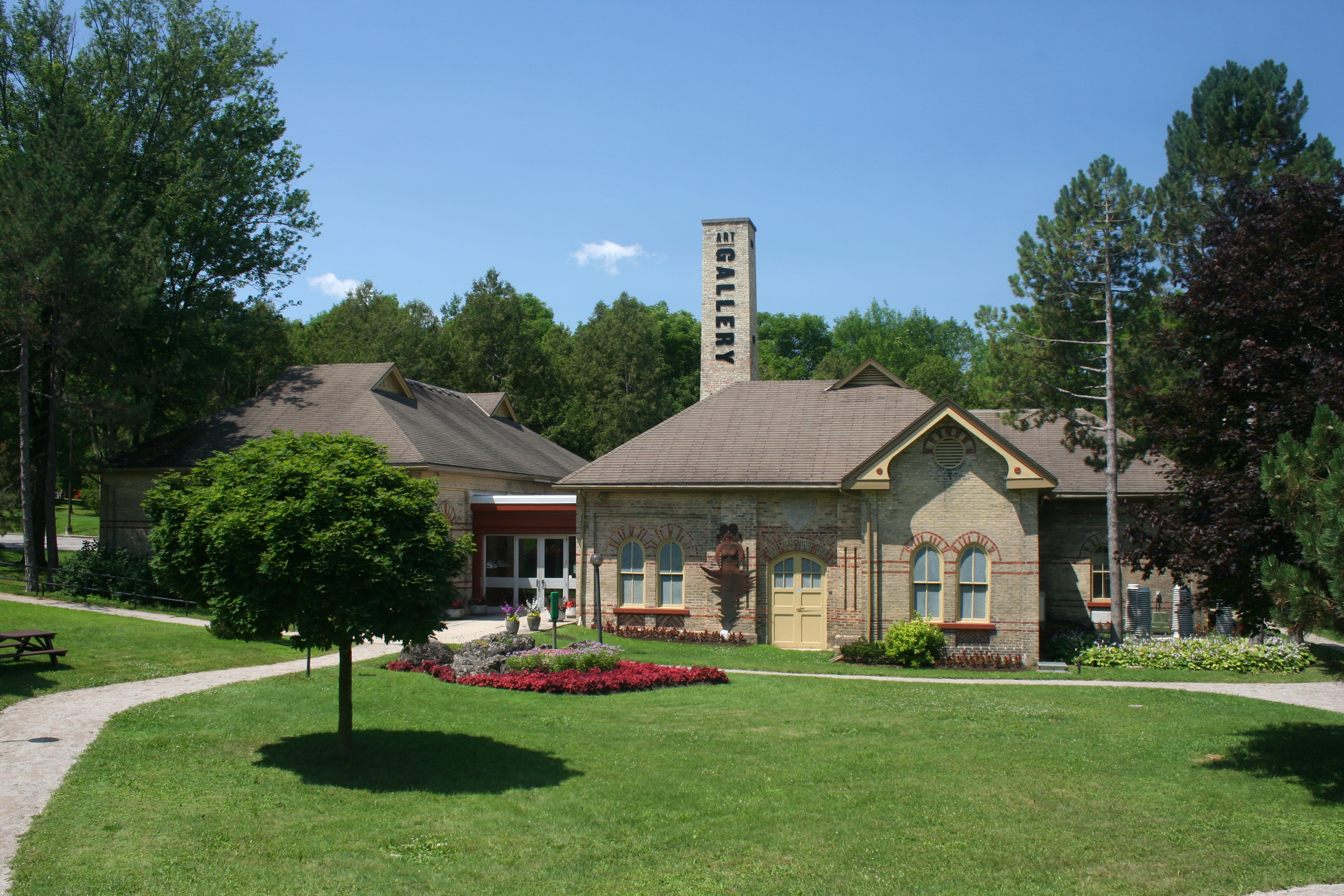
Stratford Pump House (1882–1883, with later additions)

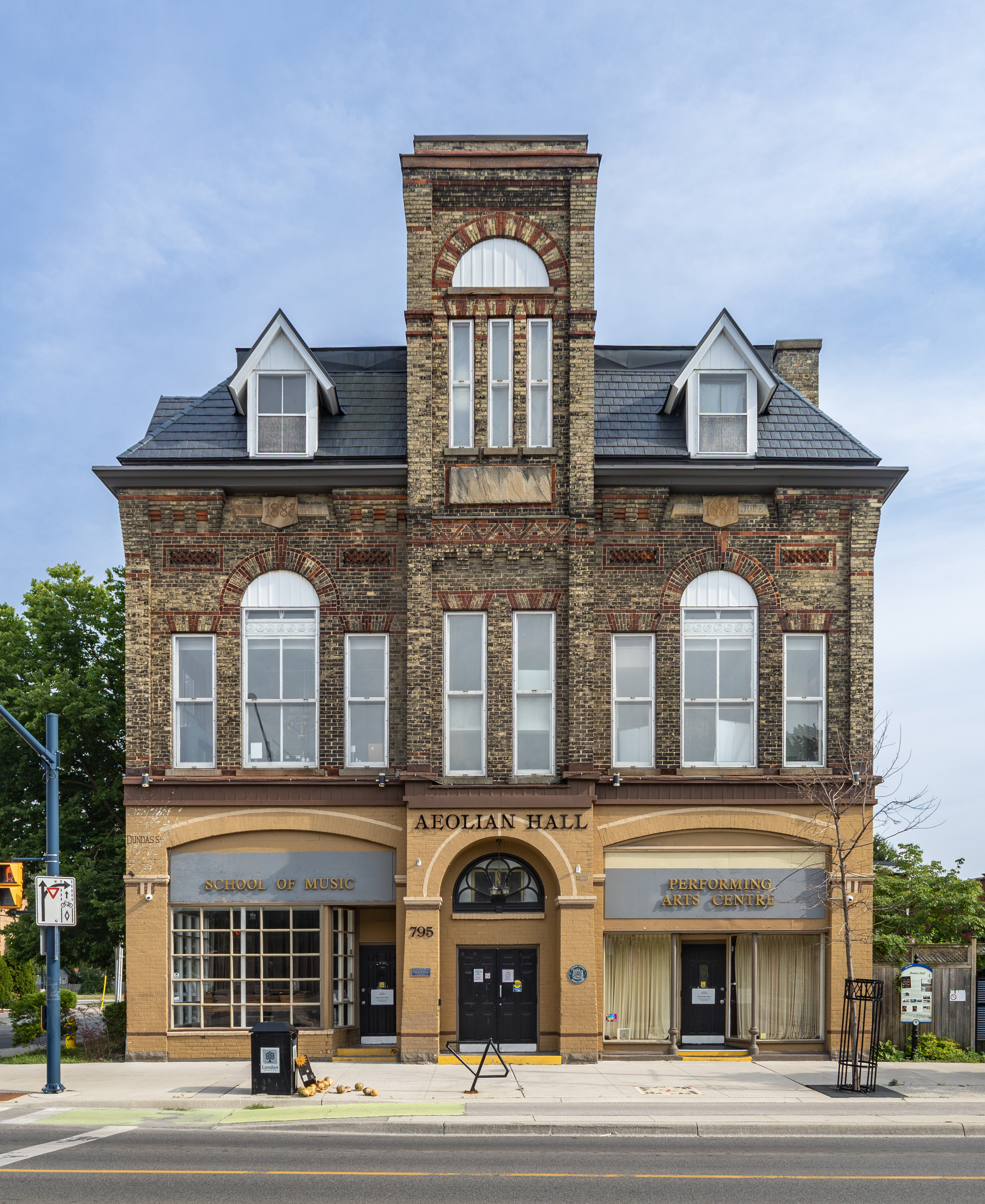
London East Town Hall (1883–1884)

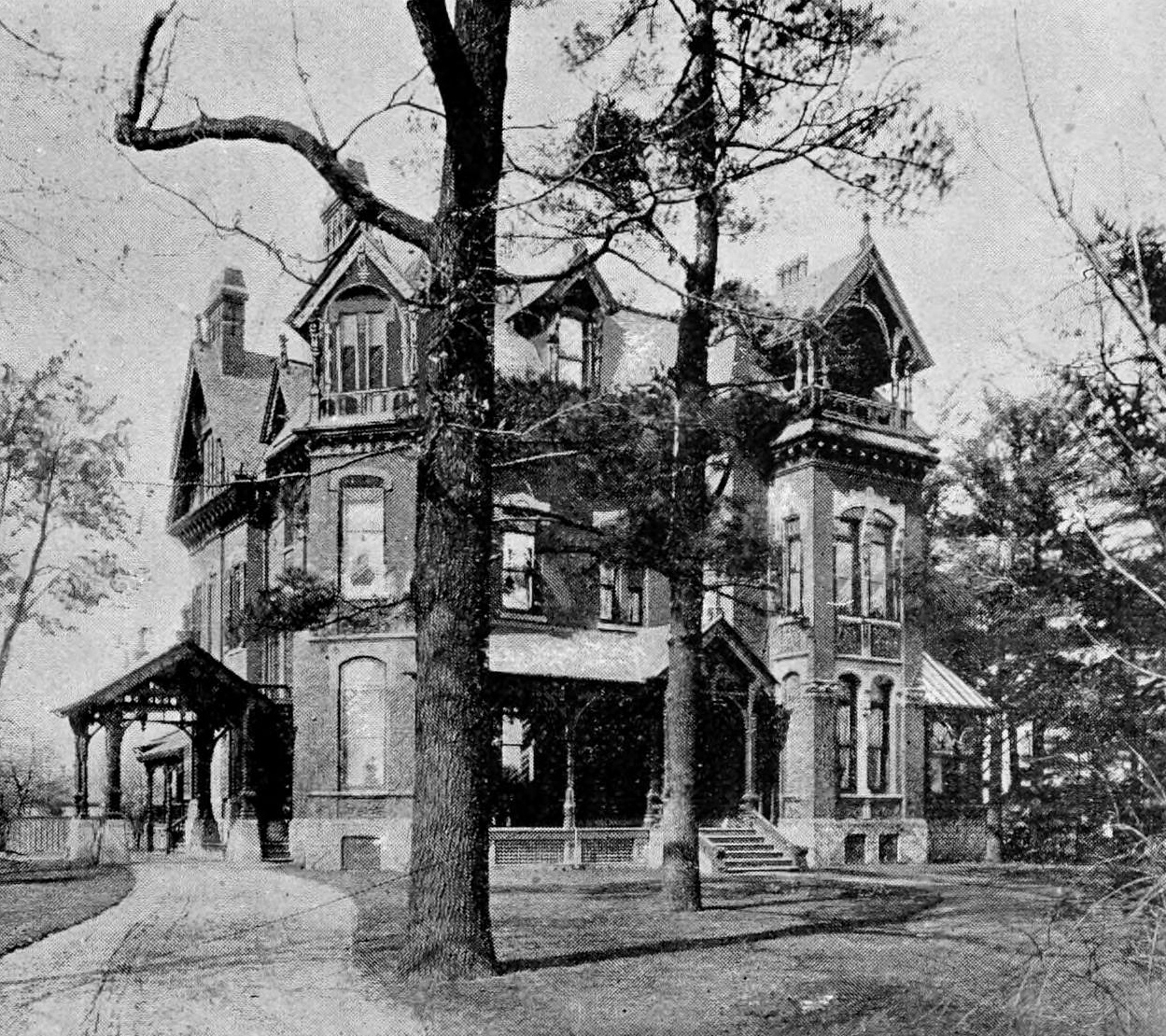
John Labbatt House (1882–1884, now demolished)

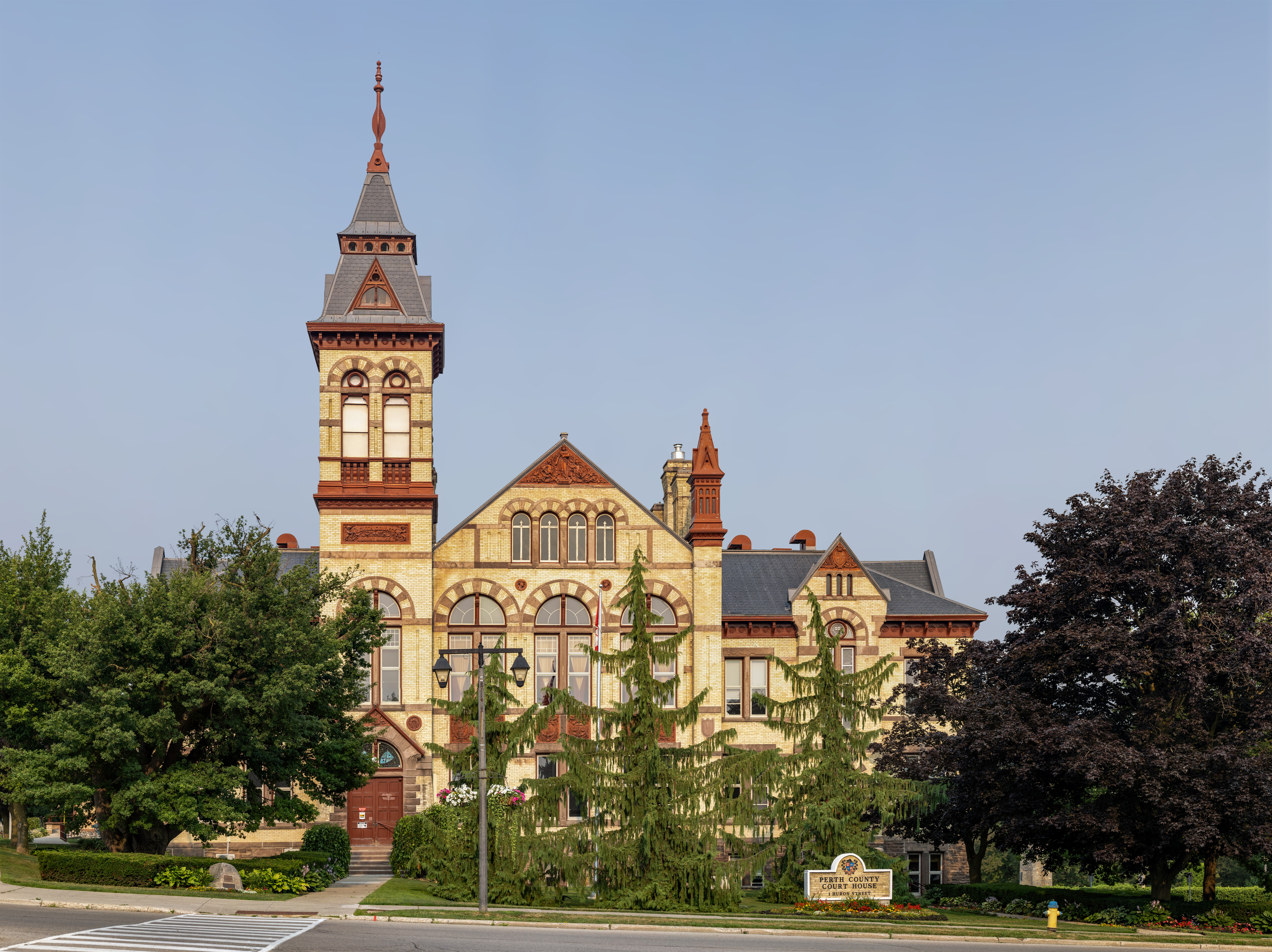
Perth County Courthouse (1885–1887)

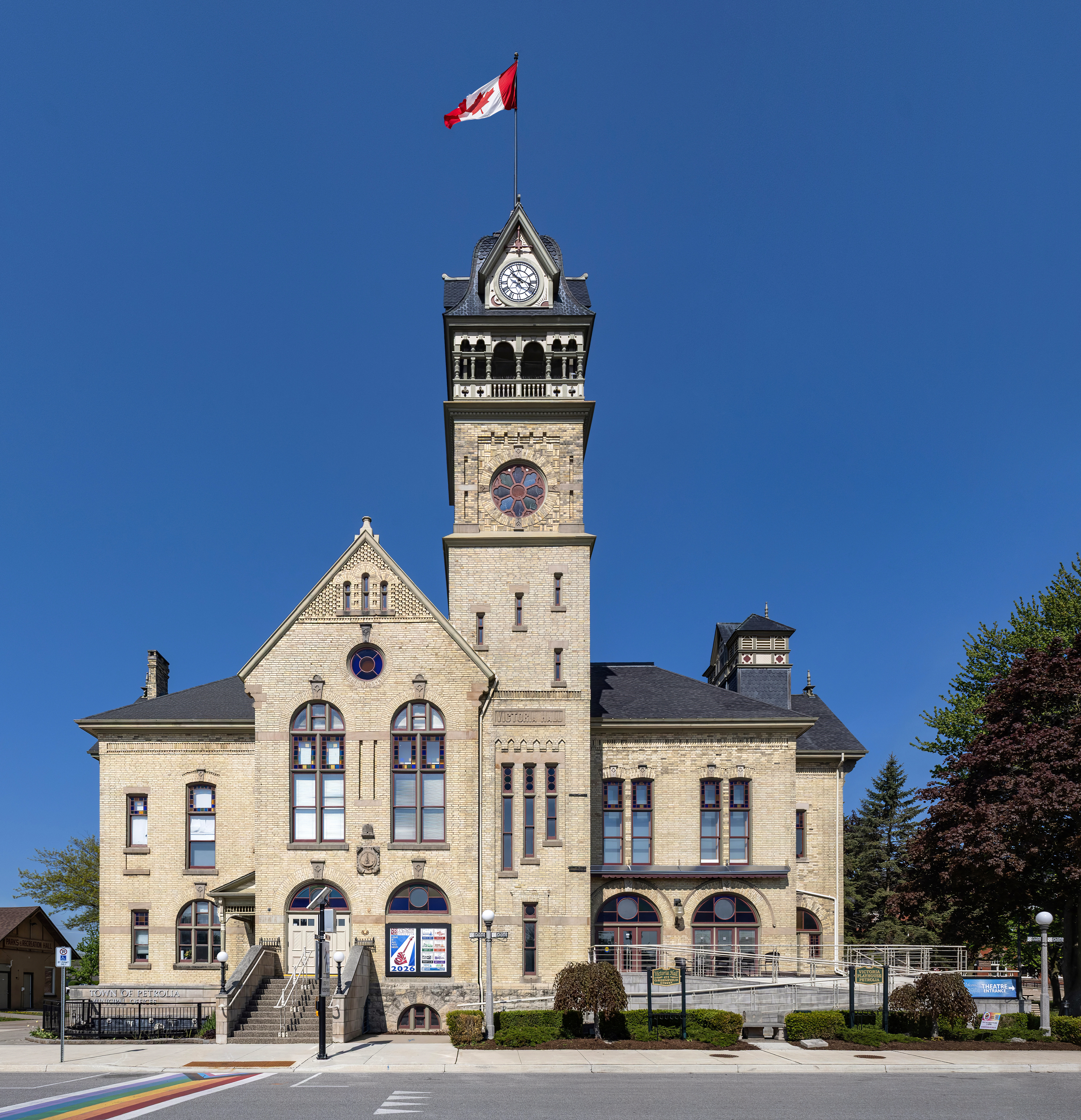
Victoria Hall (1887–1889)

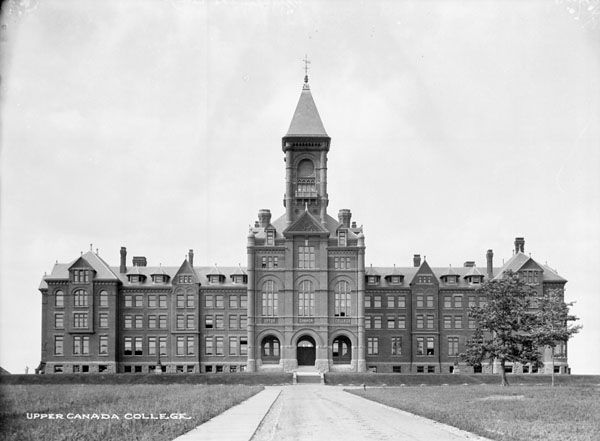
Upper Canada College (1887–1891, now demolished)

== Works cited ==
- "195 Elmwood Avenue East". Ontario Heritage Trust. Archived from the original on April 7, 2026.
- Arthur, Eric (2003). Toronto, No Mean City (third ed.). Toronto: University of Toronto Press. ISBN 978-1-4426-5779-3.
- Burr, Christina Ann (2006). Canada's Victorian Oil Town: The Transformation of Petrolia from Resource Town into a Victorian Community. Montreal: McGill-Queen's University Press. ISBN 978-0-7735-7590-5.
- "Death of Mr. Geo. F. Durand" (PDF). The Canadian Architect and Builder. Vol. 3, no. 1. Toronto. January 1890. p. 4.
- "First Christian Reformed Church". Canada's Historic Places. Parks Canada. Archived from the original on April 6, 2026.
- Gale, Richard. Finding Aid for George F. Durand (PDF). London: University of Western Ontario. Archived from the original (PDF) on August 25, 2025.
- History of the County of Middlesex, Canada. Toronto and London: W. A. & C. L. Goodspeed. 1889.
- "How George Durand Put His Stamp on Petrolia" (PDF). The Independent of Petrolia and Central Lambton. January 11, 2024. p. 9. Archived from the original (PDF) on April 28, 2026.
- London and Its Men of Affairs. London, Ontario: Advertiser Job Printing Co. 1915.
- MacRae, Marion; Adamson, Anthony (1983). Cornerstones of Order: Courthouses and Town Halls of Ontario, 1784–1914. Toronto: Clarke Irwin Inc. ISBN 978-0-7720-1387-3.
- "Murphy, Ronald Eyare" (PDF). Honour Roll. Ontario Association of Architects. Archived from the original (PDF) on April 28, 2026.
- McMann, Evelyn de R. (2018). Royal Canadian Academy of Arts, Academie Royale des Arts du Canada: Exhibitions and Members, 1880–1979. Toronto: University of Toronto Press. ISBN 978-1-4875-7701-8.
- "Ontario Association of Architects". The Canadian Architect and Builder. Vol. 2, no. 4. Toronto. April 1889. pp. 40–41.
- "Stratford Waterworks". Canada's Historic Places. Parks Canada. Archived from the original on April 10, 2026.
- "The Aeolian Hall". Canada's Historic Places. Parks Canada. Archived from the original on April 10, 2026.
- Tausky, Nancy Z. (1989). "London's Schools". Acorn. Vol. 14. Toronto. pp. 11–13.
- Tausky, Nancy (2005). "George F. Durand". In Baker, Michael; Bates Neary, Hilary (eds.). 100 Fascinating Londoners. James Lorimer & Company. pp. 24–25. ISBN 978-1-55028-882-7.
- Tausky, Nancy Z.; Distefano, Lynne D. (2018). Victorian Architecture in London and Southwestern Ontario: Symbols of Aspiration. Toronto: University of Toronto Press. ISBN 978-1-4875-8257-9. JSTOR 10.3138/j.ctvfrxbbj.
- "Victoria Hall". Canada's Historic Places. Parks Canada. Archived from the original on April 6, 2026.
- "Waverly". Canada's Historic Places. Parks Canada. Archived from the original on April 6, 2026.
- "Wolseley Barracks, A Block". Canada's Historic Places. Parks Canada. Archived from the original on April 19, 2026.
- "Wolseley Barracks National Historic Site of Canada". Canada's Historic Places. Parks Canada. Archived from the original on April 19, 2026.
- "Wolseley Barracks National Historic Site of Canada". Parks Canada. Archived from the original on April 13, 2026.
