= Aeolian Hall (London, Ontario) =

Historic music hall in London, Ontario

Coordinates: 42.9906°N 81.2248°W

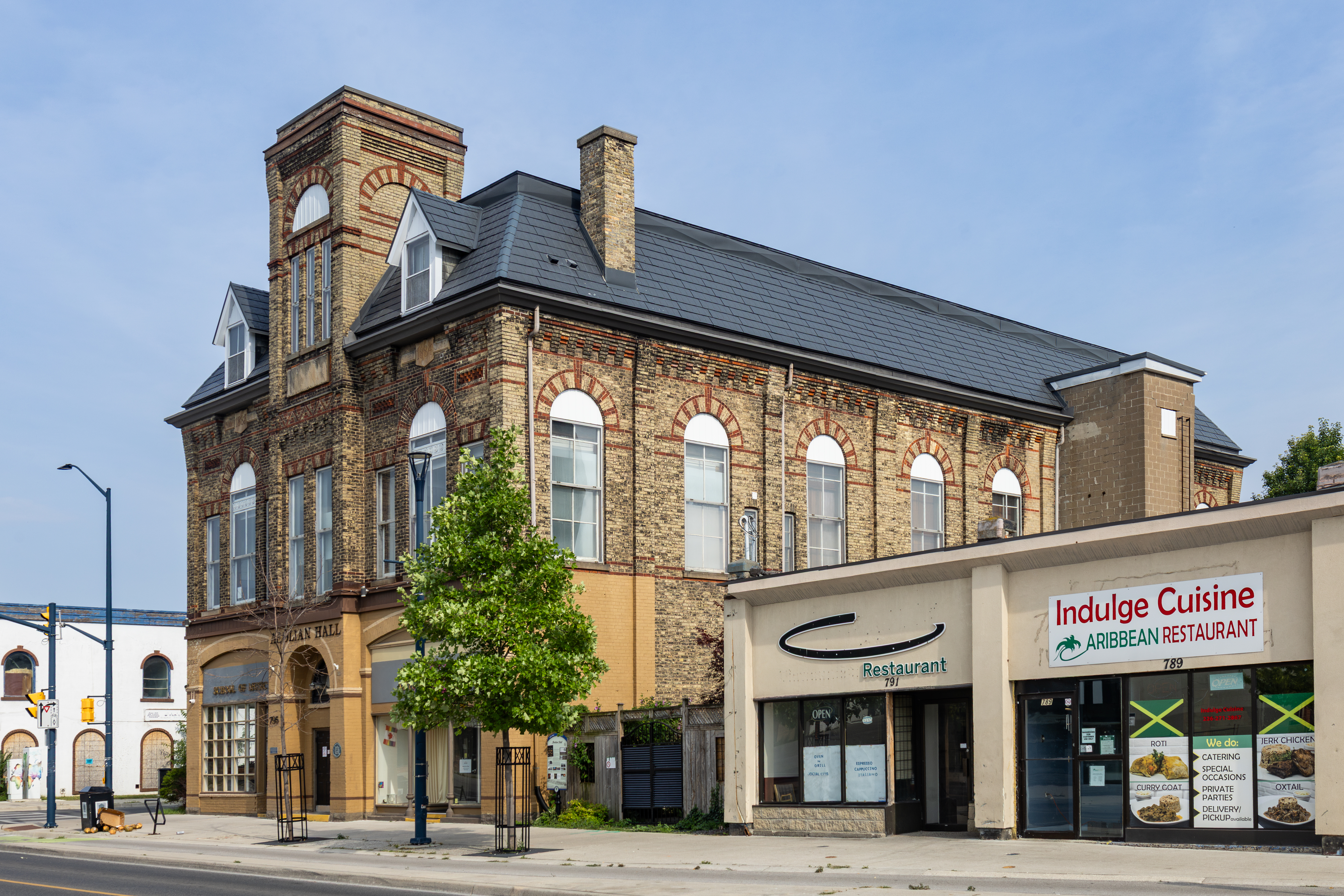
Aeolian Hall

Aeolian Hall is the name of a historic music venue (housed in two different edifices) in London, Ontario.

== Beecher United Church location ==
In 1947, Gordon D. Jeffery purchased the closing Beecher United Church on Dundas St between Waterloo and Colborne and turned it into the Aeolian Hall with an aim to promote local classical and chamber music. This church had been erected in 1876 and had originally been known as the First Congregational Church.

A new Aeolian-Skinner organ was installed in December 1949. The dedication concert featured Ernest White and Jeffery, and a commissioned work Music for Organ and Strings by Friedrich Breydert.

This first building burned down in 1968. The church tower was preserved and remains erected at the site, where it is a London Heritage Site and where it is the namesake for a parking garage business called "London Towers".

== Old Town Hall location ==
In 1969, Jeffery purchased the old London town hall building, and turned this into a new Aeolian Hall concert venue. The hall is located in a heritage building at 795 Dundas Street, at the corner of Dundas St. and Rectory St, just to the east of Adelaide St. Designed by George F. Durand, it was first built as the town hall of the then independent community of London East. The building was completed in 1884; a year later London East amalgamated with London. The building served a number of different purposes over the next decades, including serving as a fire station, court house, public library, school, and a number of businesses. The building was sold by the city in 1947 and it became home to a series of private businesses. The longest serving tenant was Frank C. Warder Radio Limited, which occupied the street level portion of the building from 1950 to 1982.

Aeolian Hall has served as one of London's premier musical venues ever since. The building is host to a wide range of events. It is the past home of both the London Youth Symphony and London Community Orchestra (both of which now present their performance series in Dundas St. Centre United Church), and hosts visiting performers from a wide array of genres.

Gordon Jeffery died in 1986 leaving the Hall to the Gordon Jeffery Trust to run and maintain as a musical venue for London. The Trust was nearing the end of its mandate in 2003 and decided to put the building up for sale. The Gabriel Kney tracker pipe organ was purchased by, and is now installed in, the First United Church of Waterloo Ontario.

Mr. Clark Bryan, concert pianist, bought the Hall in July 2004 and expanded its mandate to include multi-genre music and art presentation as well as community events. In 2009, Bryan shifted the governance of The Aeolian to a Registered Charity/Non-Profit Corporation called The Aeolian Hall Musical Arts Association (AHMAA). Mr. Bryan transferred ownership of the building to this charity in February 2011 to ensure its future in the Public Trust.

The Aeolian Town Hall is the home the Aeolian School of Music and Aeolian Hall. It has thrice been awarded "Best Live Venue" at the Jack Richardson Music Awards, and has been selected as one of the Top 10 Halls in Canada by the CBC Radio 3 Searchlight Contest. In 2010, The Aeolian was given a Pillar Award by The Mayor of London for outstanding Community Contribution. The Aeolian Hall has become a centre for research and development of arts programs with focus on social justice, social inclusion, and community development.

In November 2011 AHMAA launched the El Sistema Aeolian program. This program is designed to offer free music training for youth with a focus on classical orchestral music.
