= William Sherwood Fox =

Canadian classical scholar (1878-1967)

- Born: June 17, 1878
- Died: August 14, 1967 (aged 89)

William Sherwood Fox (1878–1967) was a Canadian classical scholar.

Notable positions in his academic career include assistant professor at Princeton University (1911–17), professor of classics at Western University of London, Ontario (1917–27), becoming dean of the faculty of arts there (1919–27), and president (1927-47).
