= Architectural Conservancy of Ontario =

Ontario organization

The Architectural Conservancy of Ontario is a nonprofit organization operating in the Canadian Province of Ontario that promotes the conservation and reuse of architectural structures as well as the conservation of districts and landscapes. Much of its work is carried out through its local branches. It was founded in 1933.
