= Cronyn =

Cronyn is a surname. Notable people with the surname include:

- Benjamin Cronyn (1802–1871), the first bishop of the Anglican Diocese of Huron
- Hume Cronyn, OC (1911–2003), Canadian actor of stage and screen
- Hume Cronyn (politician) (1864–1933), Canadian politician and lawyer

== See also ==
- William B. Cronyn House, also known as the House at 271 Ninth Street, is a historic home located in Brooklyn, New York, New York
- Frederick Cronyn Betts (1896–1938), Canadian politician and solicitor
- Cronin
