= Thomas Beattie (politician) =

Canadian politician

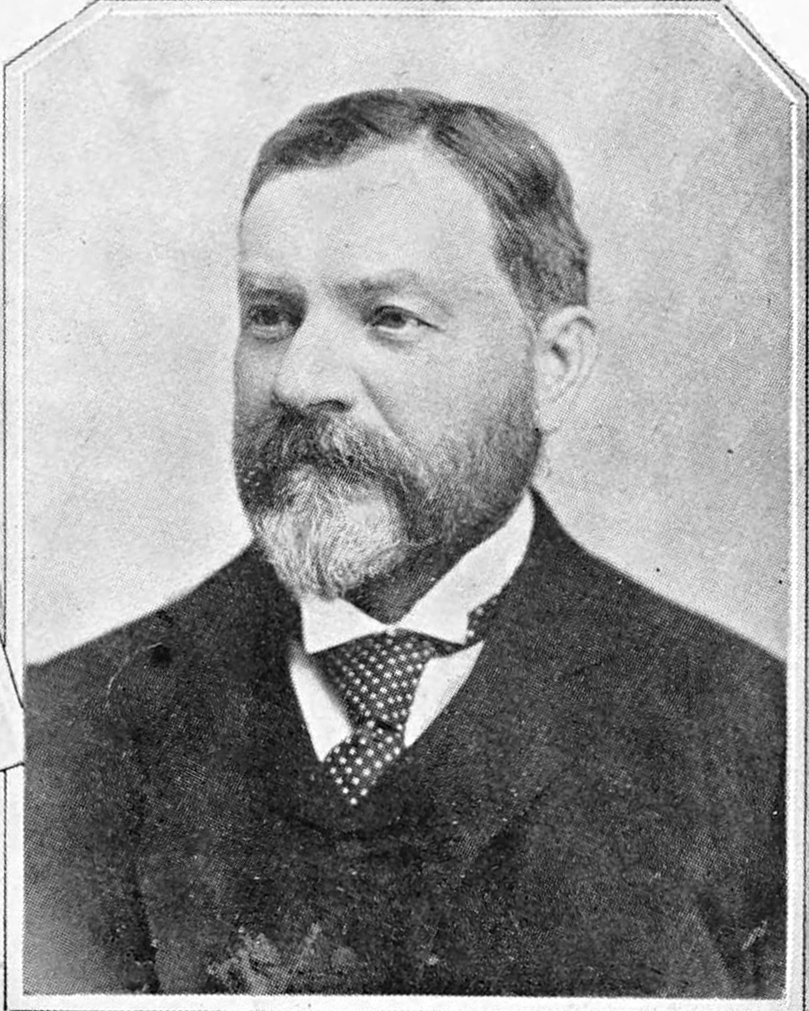

Member of the Canadian Parliament for London
- In office 1896–1900
- Preceded by: John Carling
- Succeeded by: C. S. Hyman
- In office 1907–1914
- Preceded by: C. S. Hyman
- Succeeded by: William Gray

Personal details
- Born: August 12, 1844 Saintfield, Ireland
- Died: December 2, 1914 (aged 70)
- Party: Conservative

Thomas Beattie (August 12, 1844 – December 2, 1914) was a Canadian politician.

Born in Saintfield, County Down, Ireland, Beattie emigrated to Canada with his parents in 1848. A businessman, he was a Major with the 7th Fusiliers of London, Ontario and served during the North-West Rebellion. He was Vice-President of London City Gas Company and a Director of the Agricultural Savings and Loan Company. He first entered politics as an alderman in London. He was first elected to the House of Commons of Canada in the 1896 federal election. A Conservative, he was defeated in the 1900 federal election but was re-elected in a 1907 by-election. He served until his death, aged 70, in 1914.
