= Ernest Halpenny =

Canadian politician

George Ernest Halpenny, PC (June 14, 1903 – May 10, 1974) was a Canadian politician.

A chemist by training, Halpenny was first elected to the House of Commons of Canada in the 1957 federal election that brought John Diefenbaker to power. Elected as the Progressive Conservative Member of Parliament for London, Halpenny was appointed by Diefenbaker as parliamentary assistant to the Minister of National Health and Welfare in 1957. In 1960, he was promoted to Cabinet as minister without portfolio and in 1962 he was promoted to Secretary of State for Canada.

After winning three successive elections, Halpenny did not run in the 1963 federal election. Halpenny later started a chain of pharmacies called Canada Apothecary with partner William Muchan

Parliament of Canada
Preceded by Robert Weld Mitchell, Progressive Conservative	Member of Parliament from London; 1957-1963	Succeeded by Jack Irvine, Progressive Conservative
