= George Wenige =

Canadian politician

George Albert Wenige (1874–1952) was a mayor of London, Ontario, Canada, who served nine terms, mostly non-consecutively. He also served on the board of directors of the Canadian League for the Advancement of Coloured People.

Wenige (pronounced WHEN-igg) was born in Detroit, Michigan in 1874 and moved to London, Ontario as a stunt bicycle rider at the Western Fair in 1900. He liked the city and decided to stay, opening the Bicycle and Motor Sales Company. In 1915, he insisted that a new shop be built and completed in 30 days; he hired a brass band to motivate the workers. He claimed his shop "made walking expensive" and once bicycled from London to Halifax, Nova Scotia to promote his business.

Wenige was a populist and was well loved by London's working class. He was elected alderman in 1921 and was then elected to three consecutive terms as mayor from 1923 to 1925. In 1925, he attended the funeral of former mayor Sir Adam Beck, earning the scorn of London's upper class by wearing a business suit and a straw hat -- "the only hat I owned"—he explained. Around this time, a newspaper in Toronto claimed that Wenige had supposedly harassed Beck in his citadel, one of the only preserved instances of anti-Wenige sentiment from the press.

Wenige was elected mayor again in 1928, 1934, 1947, 1948 and 1950 (at the time, London elected its mayors for one year only). In 1935, he ran as an independent candidate in the federal election but lost. He also campaigned for mayor, and lost on nine other occasions. In 1952, he lost to Allan Rush, the former chief of police whom Wenige had fired during his term in 1950. Wenige died shortly afterwards.

When the Ontario Department of Highways built Highway 126, a freeway linking London to Highway 401 in 1963, the City of London named the 360-metre section from Hamilton Road south to the Thames River the "Wenige Expressway." The signs denoting this stretch of the road disappeared in the 1980s, and today it is known only as Highbury Avenue. In north London, he is commemorated by "North" and "South Wenige Drive," and there have been proposals to rename London's bicycle paths after him.

He is buried in Woodland Cemetery in London, Ontario.

1935 Canadian federal election: London
Party	Candidate	Votes
Conservative	Frederick Cronyn Betts	10,911
Liberal	George Arthur Porte Brickenden	8,628
Reconstruction	John Franklin White	3,814
Co-operative Commonwealth	Everett Orlan Hall	3,041
Independent	George Wenige	2,101
Independent Liberal	Clifford Hamilton Reason	1,203
Independent	Hugh Allan Stevenson	406
