= John Walker (Canadian politician) =

Canadian politician (1832–1889)

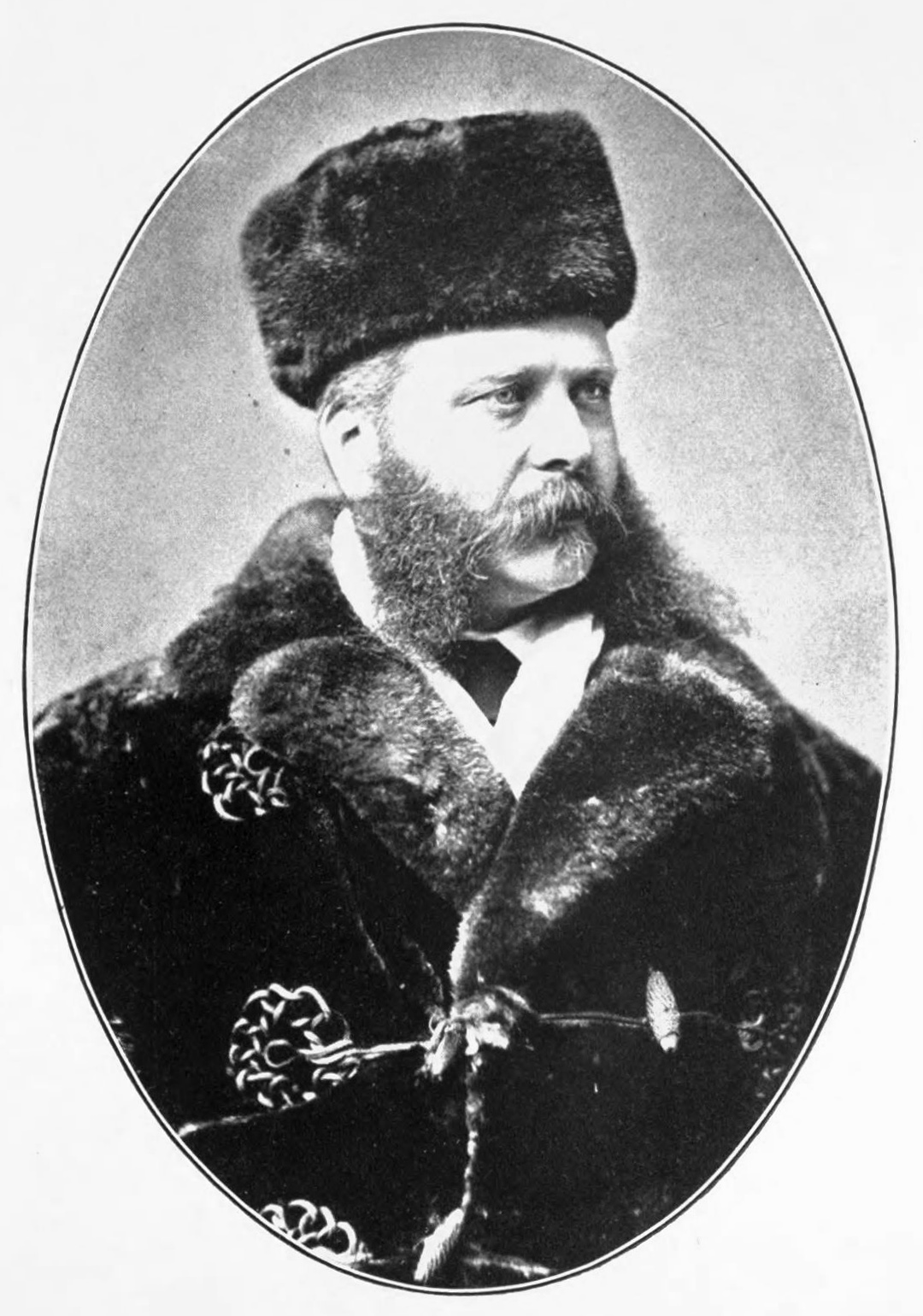
Walker in an undated photograph

John Walker (January 24, 1832 – August 14, 1889) was a Scottish-born industrialist and political figure in Ontario. He represented London in the House of Commons of Canada in 1874 as a Liberal member.

Born in Argyleshire, the son of John Walker and Mary McHardy, Walker was educated at the Stirling Academy and established himself in business in Leith and later Glasgow. He served as a member of the Queen's Own Yeomanry Cavalry in Glasgow. In 1856, he married Janet Machattie; she died in 1863. Walker came to Kent County, Canada West in 1864, chosen by investors in Scotland to develop agricultural and oil interests on property formerly owned by George Brown. On his arrival, he was named magistrate. Walker raised a volunteer company during the Fenian raids and later reached the rank of lieutenant-colonel in the militia. In 1867, he settled in London, Ontario, where he established a plant for the production of sulfuric acid and an oil refinery. For a time, he served as vice-president for the Canadian Pacific Railway. In 1868, Walker married Laura, the daughter of Jacob Hespeler. Walker defeated John Carling in the 1874 federal election but, after his election was overturned on appeal, James Harshaw Fraser won the 1875 by-election that followed. Walker ran unsuccessfully against Carling for reelection to the House of Commons in 1878. He was one of the founding directors of Imperial Oil in 1880. Walker became registrar for Middlesex County after retiring from politics. He died in London, Ontario at the age of 57.
