= Graham Jarvis =

Canadian actor (1930–2003)

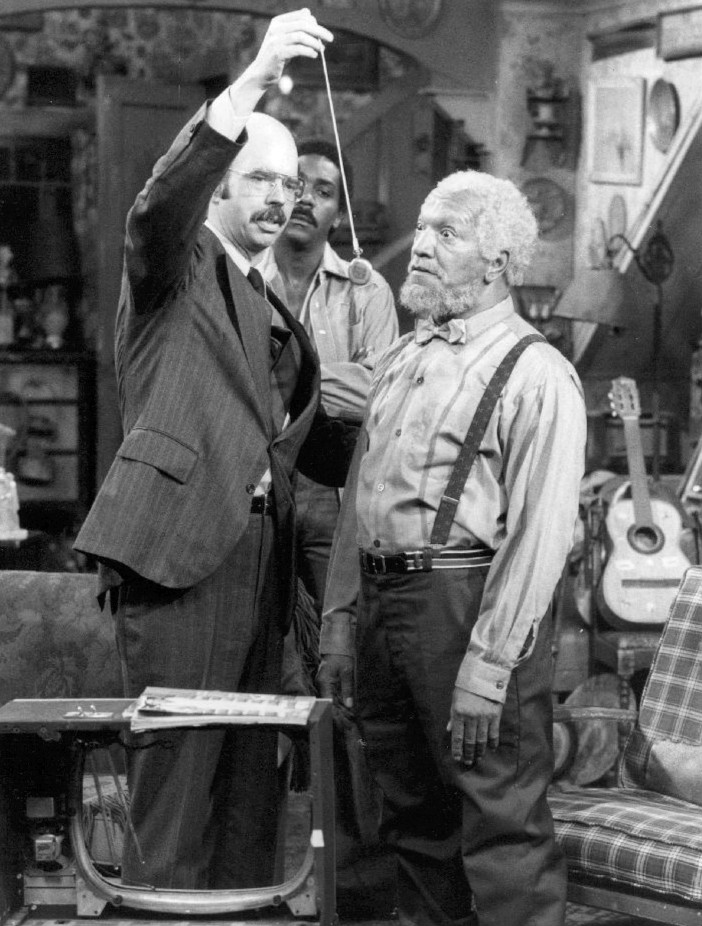
- Jarvis (left) with Redd Foxx on TV's Sanford and Son (1976). Demond Wilson is in the background.
- Born: Graham Powley Jarvis; August 25, 1930; Toronto, Ontario, Canada
- Died: April 16, 2003 (aged 72); Los Angeles, California, U.S.
- Resting place: Valley Oaks Memorial Park
- Occupation: Actor
- Years active: 1952–2003
- Spouse: JoAnne Rader Jarvis
- Children: 2

Graham Powley Jarvis (August 25, 1930 – April 16, 2003) was a Canadian character actor in American films and television from the 1960s to the early 2000s.

== Early years ==
Jarvis was born in Toronto, Ontario, the son of Margaret Biddulph (Scratcherd) and William Henry Reginald Jarvis, an investment banker and president of John Labatt Ltd. His maternal great-grandfather was businessman and brewer John Labatt, whose own father was Labatt founder John Kinder Labatt.

== Career ==
Jarvis starred in the television soap opera parody Mary Hartman, Mary Hartman as Charlie "Baby Boy" Haggers, the much older husband of wanna-be country music star Loretta Haggers, played by Mary Kay Place. He also appeared on other television programs such as Murder, She Wrote, Naked City, Route 66, N.Y.P.D., All in the Family, M*A*S*H, The Bob Newhart Show, The Odd Couple, Mork & Mindy, Starsky and Hutch, Hart To Hart, Cagney and Lacey, Mama's Family, Fame, Married... with Children, Star Trek: The Next Generation, Get a Life, The X Files, ER, Home Improvement, and Six Feet Under.

He played character roles in several films, including as Amos Bush, the leader of the ultra-conservative Christopher Mott Society (inspired by the John Birch Society) in Cold Turkey.

His last major role was in the WB Network TV drama 7th Heaven, as Charles Jackson, whom he portrayed until his death in 2003.

Jarvis portrayed Elliot Sinclair in The Journeyman Project trilogy of video games and was also the narrator in the first American production of The Rocky Horror Show at the Roxy Theatre in Los Angeles, playing alongside Tim Curry.

== Personal life and death ==
Jarvis lived in Los Angeles with his wife Joanna Jarvis. He had two sons, Lex and Matt. On April 16, 2003, he died from multiple myeloma. He was interred at Pierce Brothers Valley Oaks Memorial Park in Westlake Village, California.

== Filmography ==
- Bye Bye Braverman (1968) - Man on Bus (uncredited)
- Alice's Restaurant (1969) - Music Teacher
- End of the Road (1970) - Dr. Carter
- The Out-of-Towners (1970) - Murray
- Move (1970) - Dr. Picker
- R. P. M. (1970) - Police Chief Henry J. Thatcher
- The Traveling Executioner (1970) - Doc Prittle
- Cold Turkey (1971) - Amos Bush
- A New Leaf (1971) - Bo
- The Organization (1971) - William Martin
- The Hot Rock (1972) - Warden
- What's Up, Doc? (1972) - Bailiff
- Witches of Salem: Horror and Hope (1972) - William Barker
- The Odd Couple (TV Series); episode “The Big Broadcast” (1974) - Jim Antrobus
- Russian Roulette (1975) - Benson
- ‘’M*A*S*H’’ (1975) Episode “Big Mac” S3EP21 - Col. Whiteman
- Mary Hartman, Mary Hartman (1976) - Charlie Haggers
- Prophecy (1979) - Shusette
- Middle Age Crazy (1980) - J.D.
- The Amateur (1981) - Porter
- Hart to Hart (1978–1984, TV Series) - Ben Drootin
- Mr. Mom (1983) - Humphries
- Deal of the Century (1983) - Babers
- Silkwood (1983) - Doctor at Union Meeting
- Draw! (1984) - Wally Blodgett
- The Chain (1984) - Foxx
- Mischief (1985) - Mr. Miller
- Doin' Time (1985) - Prescott
- One Magic Christmas (1985) - Frank Crump
- Weekend Warriors (1986) - Congressman Balljoy
- Tough Guys (1986) - Richie's Boss
- Do You Know the Muffin Man? (1989) - Judge Allen
- Parents (1989) - Mr. Zellner
- Murder, She Wrote - "The Sins of Castle Cove" (Season 2) (1989)
- Misery (1990) - Libby
- Star Trek: The Next Generation (1991) - Klim Dokachin
- Love, Honor & Obey: The Last Mafia Marriage (1993) - Mr. Vickers
- Son in Law (1993) - Principal
- Trial by Jury (1994) - Mr. Duffy, Foreman
- Last of the Dogmen (1995) - Pharmacist
- The Sports Pages (2001) - Judge (segment "How Doc Waddems Finally Broke 100")
- 7th Heaven (1996–2003, TV Series) - Charles Jackson (final appearance)
