= Hugh Allan Stevenson =

Canadian politician

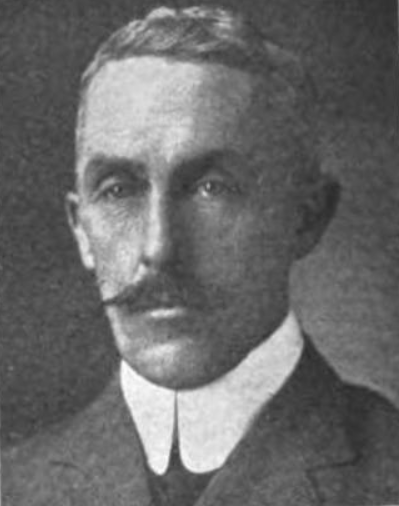

Member of the Legislative Assembly of Ontario
- In office 1919–1923
- Constituency: London

Mayor of London, Ontario
- In office 1915–1917

Personal details
- Born: October 2, 1870 London, Ontario
- Died: May 28, 1942 (aged 71) London, Ontario
- Party: Labour
- Occupation: Physician, politician

Doctor Hugh Allan Stevenson (Note: Also spelled "Allen" in many sources) (October 2, 1870 – May 28, 1942) was a physician and politician in Ontario, Canada. He served as mayor of London in 1915 and from 1916 to 1917. Stevenson represented London in the Legislative Assembly of Ontario from 1919 to 1923 as a Labour member.

He was born in London and was educated there. Stevenson served two years on London city council. He also served two years on the public utilities commission and two years as a water commissioner. Stevenson also served as a major in the local militia.

Stevenson was elected to the Ontario assembly in 1919, defeating Adam Beck, who was running as an independent. He ran unsuccessfully for the London seat in the Canadian House of Commons in 1935. On May 28, 1942, Stevenson died at his home in London after a long illness, aged 71.

Stevenson Avenue in London was named in his honour.

1935 Canadian federal election: London
Party	Candidate	Votes
Conservative	Frederick Cronyn Betts	10,911
Liberal	George Arthur Porte Brickenden	8,628
Reconstruction	John Franklin White	3,814
Co-operative Commonwealth	Everett Orlan Hall	3,041
Independent	George Albert Wenige	2,101
Independent Liberal	Clifford Hamilton Reason	1,203
Independent	Hugh Allan Stevenson	406
