= C. S. Hyman =

Canadian businessman, politician, and sportsman

The Honourable Charles Smith Hyman PC
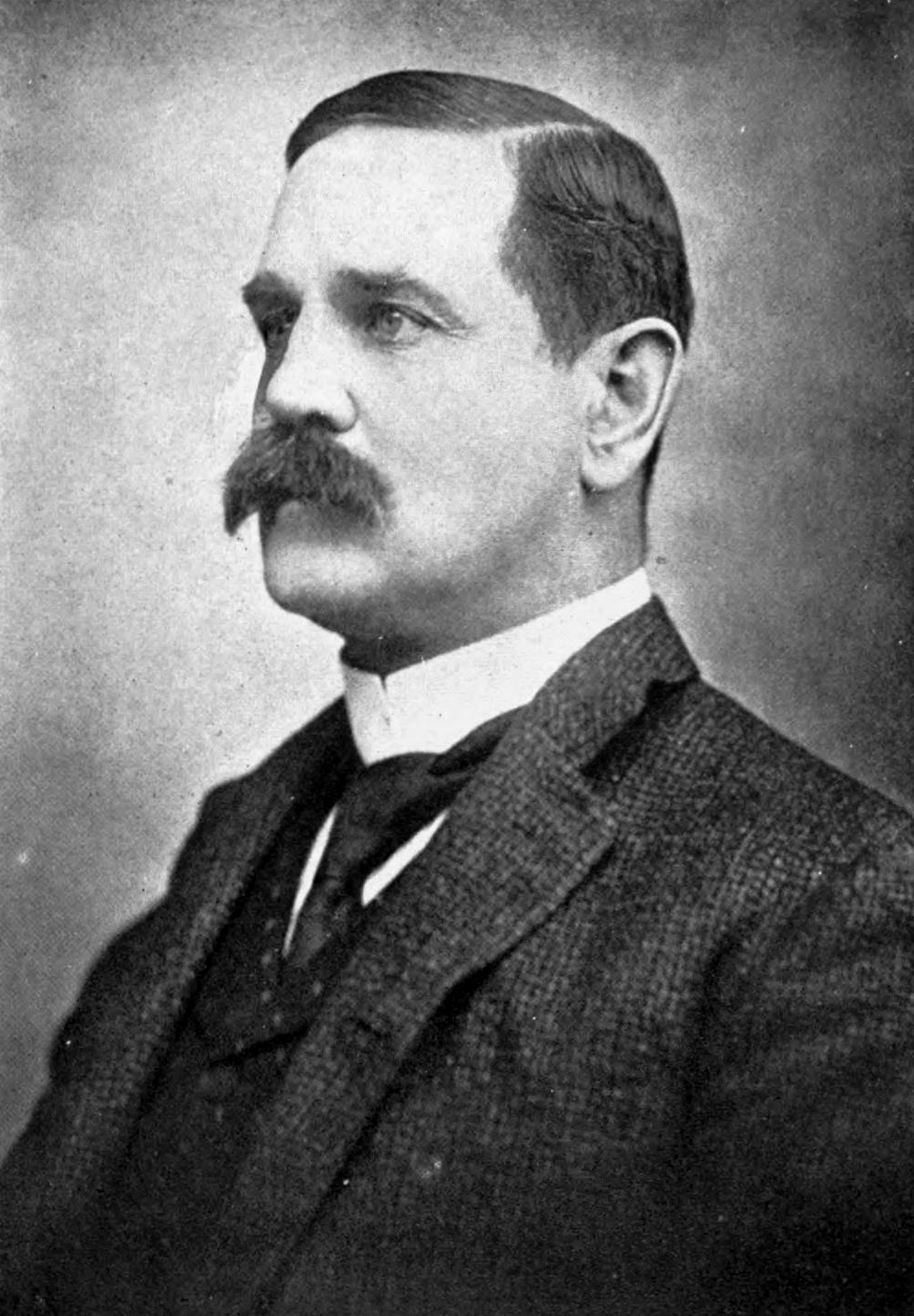

Member of the Canadian Parliament for London
- In office 1891–1892
- Preceded by: John Carling
- Succeeded by: John Carling
- In office 1900–1907
- Preceded by: Thomas Beattie
- Succeeded by: Thomas Beattie

Personal details
- Born: August 31, 1854 London, Canada West
- Died: October 9, 1926 (aged 72)
- Resting place: Woodland Cemetery in London, Ontario.
- Party: Liberal
- Cabinet: Minister Without Portfolio (1904–1905); Minister of Public Works (1905–1907)

C. S. Hyman
- Country (sports): Canada
- Residence: Canada

Singles
- Career titles: 5 ATP

Doubles
- Career titles: 0 ATP
- Last updated on: July 25, 2016.

Charles Smith ("C.S.") Hyman, PC (August 31, 1854 – October 9, 1926) was a Canadian businessman, notable politician, and sportsman. He was a popular tennis player and won a record five Canadian Opens, until broken by Ivan Lendl with six titles.

== Early life and business ==
Born in London, Canada West, the son of Ellis Walton Hyman, a tanner and entrepreneur, and Annie Maria Niles, he was educated at Hellmuth Academy in London and then started a shoe factory with his father in 1874. In 1876, he married Elizabeth Birrell, and for two years, they had an Idlewyld mansion built, which is now an inn. Hyman was president of the London Board of Trade from 1881 to 1882. In 1916, He built a summer estate in Port Stanley, Ontario on the shore of Lake Erie. He was also a tannery owner.

== Politics ==
Hyman was elected to the London city council in 1882 and was mayor in 1884. He first ran as a Liberal candidate against John Carling for the House of Commons of Canada in the 1887 election for the riding of London and was defeated.

Hyman ran again in 1891 and was elected, but the election was declared void, and he was defeated in the resulting 1892 by-election. After losing again in 1896, he was elected in 1900 and was re-elected in 1904. From 1904 to 1905, he was a minister without portfolio. From 1905 to 1907, he was the Minister of Public Works. He resigned in 1907. He died in 1926 and was buried at Woodland Cemetery in London.

== Sports ==
Hyman was an early Canadian tennis champion, capturing the national tennis championship (which has since evolved into the current Rogers Cup) five times in singles – in 1884 and each year from 1886 through 1889. (Only Ivan Lendl surpassed this, winning six titles from 1980 to 1989.) Hyman also captured two doubles titles, the 1886 final partnering I.F. Hellmuth, and the 1889 final playing alongside R.S. Wood. (No one has ever won a total of seven titles.)

Hyman was also an early captain of the Canada national cricket team, quite possibly when on its 1887 England Tour.

Hyman is said to have introduced the game bridge to Canada.

== Electoral record ==
1887 Canadian federal election: London
| Party | Candidate | Votes |
|---|---|---|
| Liberal–Conservative | John Carling | 2,013 |
| Liberal | Charles S. Hyman | 1,974 |

1891 Canadian federal election: London
| Party | Candidate | Votes |
|---|---|---|
| Liberal | C. S. Hyman | 2,037 |
| Liberal–Conservative | John Carling | 1,854 |

By-election on 26 February 1892 Election annulled
| Party | Candidate | Votes |
| Liberal–Conservative | John Carling |
| Liberal | C. S. Hyman |

1896 Canadian federal election: London
| Party | Candidate | Votes |
|---|---|---|
| Conservative | Thomas Beattie | 2,325 |
| Liberal | C. S. Hyman | 2,284 |

1900 Canadian federal election: London
| Party | Candidate | Votes |
|---|---|---|
| Liberal | C. S. Hyman | 2,812 |
| Conservative | Thomas Beattie | 2,265 |
| Independent | Robert Roadhouse | 236 |

1904 Canadian federal election: London
| Party | Candidate | Votes |
|---|---|---|
| Liberal | C. S. Hyman | 4,302 |
| Conservative | William Gray | 4,278 |

By-election on 13 June 1905 Hyman appointed Minister of Public Works, 22 May 1905
| Party | Candidate | Votes |
| Liberal | C. S. Hyman | 4,581 |
| Conservative | William Gray | 4,251 |
