= Trinity United Church Community Centre =

Trinity United Church
- Trinity United Church Community Centre
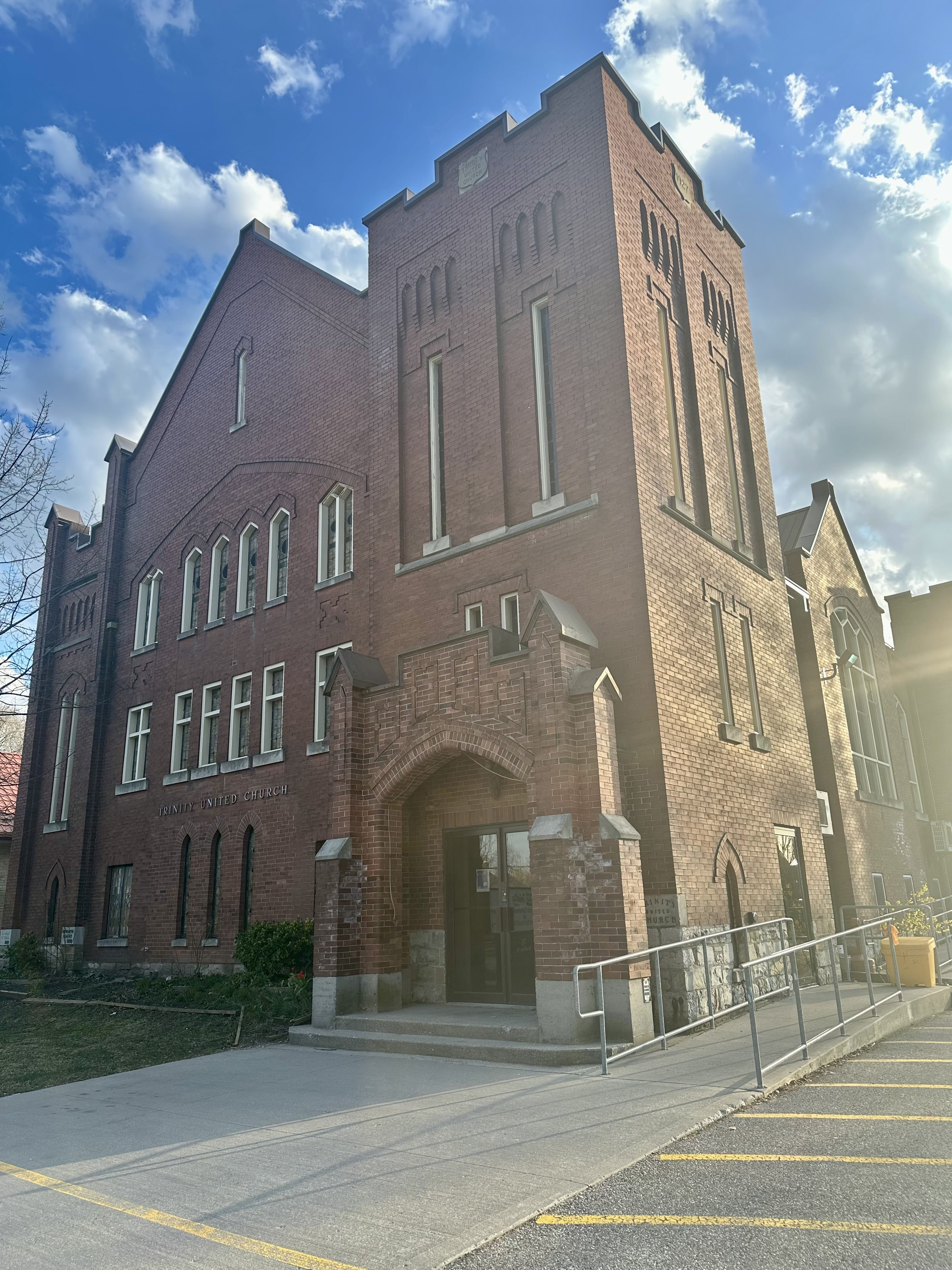
- The church building in 2024
- Trinity United Church
- 42°59′44.951″N 81°11′52.348″W
- Address: 76 Doulton St; London, Ontario; N5W 2P7
- Country: Canada
- Denomination: United Church of Canada
- Website: trinityonhale.ca

Architecture
- Architect: William George Murray
- Style: Collegiate Gothic
- Groundbreaking: 1921
- Completed: 1927

Trinity United Church Community Centre is a church affiliated to United Church of Canada, located at 76 Doulton St, London, Ontario. The church is the home of Trinity United Church and the London Spiritualist Church. On January 15, 2017, it became an affirming ministry.

Rev. Charmain Bailey Foutner is the current minister of the church. On June 2, 2022, she became the first black person to be commissioned to diaconal ministry in the history of the United Church of Canada.

== History ==
In 1908, the London Junction Methodist circuit, which included London Junction and Gore, was formed to serve the east end of London. In 1915, it changed its name to Hale Street Methodist Church. A new building was started construction in 1921–1922. The cornerstone laying ceremony took place on November 7, 1921, with the first stone being laid by the former mayor Edgar Sydney Little.

In 1925, The church joined the United Church of Canada in 1925 and was renamed Trinity United. The church building was completed in 1927 and an addition was built in 1955.

== Architecture ==
Trinity was built in 1927 in the Collegiate Gothic style by architect William George Murray. The City of London listed it as a cultural heritage property on March 26, 2007.
