= Alex Jeffery =

Canadian politician

Alexander Haley Jeffery

Member of Parliament for London
- In office June 1949 – June 1953
- Preceded by: Park A. Manross
- Succeeded by: Robert Weld Mitchell

Personal details
- Born: Alexander Haley Jeffery; 29 January 1909 London, Ontario
- Died: 11 May 1987 (aged 78)
- Party: Liberal
- Spouse(s): Eulalie Murray m. 29 June 1934
- Profession: barrister

Alexander Haley Jeffery (29 January 1909 – 11 May 1987) was a Liberal party member of the House of Commons of Canada. He was born in London, Ontario and became a barrister by career.

Jeffery was educated at the University of Western Ontario and at Osgoode Hall Law School. He achieved a Bachelor of Arts degree in economics and political science.

He was first elected to Parliament at the London riding in the 1949 general election and served only one term, in the 21st Canadian Parliament, and did not seek re-election in the 1953 election.

Jeffery also held various corporate directorships.

1949 Canadian federal election: London
Party	Candidate	Votes
Liberal	Alex Jeffery	16,427
Progressive Conservative	Park Manross	14,988
Co-operative Commonwealth	Everett O. Hall	4,532
