= Hume Cronyn =

Canadian actor and writer (1911–2003)

Hume Cronyn OC
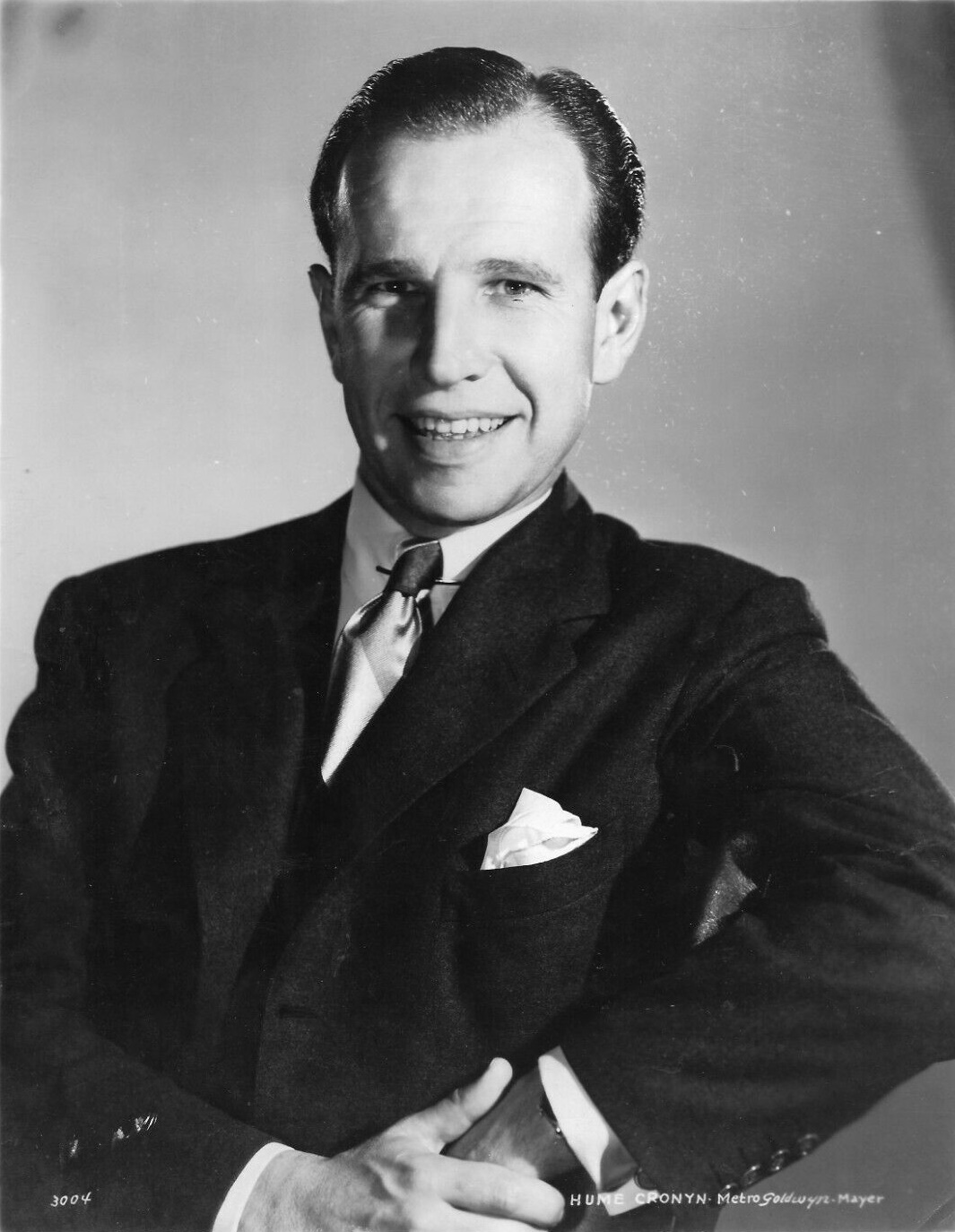
- Cronyn in the 1950s
- Born: Hume Blake Cronyn Jr. July 18, 1911; London, Ontario, Canada
- Died: June 15, 2003 (aged 91); Fairfield, Connecticut, U.S.
- Occupations: Actor; screenwriter; playwright
- Years active: 1934–2003
- Spouses: Emily Woodruff (m. 1934; div. 1936) Jessica Tandy (m. 1942; died 1994) Susan Cooper (m. 1996)
- Children: 2
- Parent: Hume Cronyn Sr. (father)
- Relatives: John Labatt (maternal grandfather); John Kinder Labatt (maternal great-grandfather); Benjamin Cronyn (paternal great-grandfather); Robert Whitehead (cousin)

Hume Blake Cronyn Jr. OC (July 18, 1911 – June 15, 2003) was a Canadian-American actor, screenwriter and playwright. He appeared in many stage productions, television and film roles throughout his career, and received many honors, including three Primetime Emmy Awards and two Tony Awards, as well as nominations for an Academy Award and a Golden Globe Award. Cronyn was the husband of actress Jessica Tandy, with whom he was presented the Kennedy Center Honor in 1986 and National Medal of Arts in 1990. In 1999, he was awarded with a star on the Canada's Walk of Fame.

== Early life ==
Cronyn, one of five children, was born in London, Ontario, Canada. His father, Hume Blake Cronyn Sr., was a businessman and a Member of Parliament for London (after whom the Hume Cronyn Memorial Observatory at Western University, then known as The University of Western Ontario and asteroid (12050) Humecronyn are named). His mother, Frances Amelia (née Labatt), was an heiress of the brewing company of the same name, as the daughter of John Labatt and the granddaughter of John Kinder Labatt. Cronyn's paternal great-grandfather, the Right Reverend Benjamin Cronyn, an Anglican cleric of the Anglo-Irish Protestant Ascendancy, served as the first bishop of the Anglican diocese of Huron and founded Huron College, from which grew the University of Western Ontario.

His great-uncle, Benjamin Jr., was both a prominent citizen and early mayor of London, Ontario, but was later indicted for fraud and fled to Vermont. During his tenure in London, he built a mansion called Oakwood, which currently serves as the head office of the Info-Tech Research Group. Cronyn was also a cousin of Canadian-born theater producer, Robert Whitehead, and a first cousin of the Canadian-British artist Hugh Verschoyle Cronyn GM (1905–1996).

Cronyn was the first Elmwood School boarder in Ottawa (at the time Elmwood was called Rockliffe Preparatory School) and boarded at Elmwood between 1917 and 1921. After leaving Elmwood, Cronyn went to Ridley College in St. Catharines, and McGill University in Montreal, where he became a member of Kappa Alpha Society. Early in life, Cronyn was an amateur featherweight boxer, having the skills to be nominated for Canada's 1932 Olympic Boxing team.

== Career ==
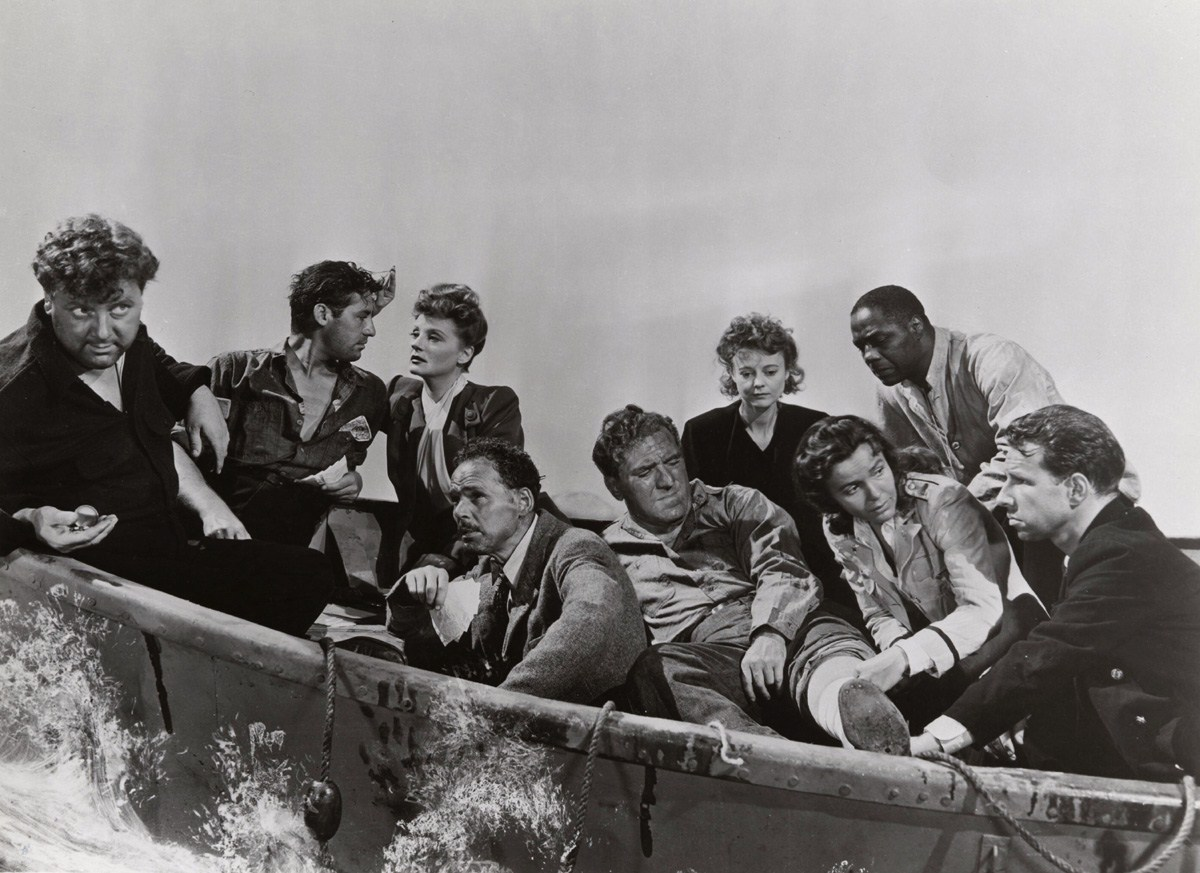
L-R: Walter Slezak, John Hodiak, Tallulah Bankhead, Henry Hull, William Bendix, Heather Angel, Mary Anderson, Canada Lee, and Hume Cronyn in Alfred Hitchcock's Lifeboat (1944)

After graduating from Ridley College Cronyn attended McGill University, where he switched majors from pre-law to drama. He continued his acting studies thereafter under Max Reinhardt and at the American Academy of Dramatic Arts. In 1934, the same year he joined The Lambs, he made his Broadway debut as a janitor in Hipper's Holiday and became known for his versatility, playing a number of different roles on stage. He won a Drama Desk Special Award in 1986. In 1990, he was awarded the National Medal of Arts.

His first Hollywood film was Alfred Hitchcock's Shadow of a Doubt (1943). He later appeared in Hitchcock's Lifeboat (1944) and worked on the screenplays of Rope (1948) and Under Capricorn (1949). He was nominated for an Academy Award for Best Supporting Actor for his performance in The Seventh Cross (1944) and won a Tony Award for his performance as Polonius opposite Richard Burton's Hamlet (1964). Cronyn bought the screenplay What Nancy Wanted from Norma Barzman, who was later blacklisted with her husband Ben Barzman, with the idea of producing the film and starring Tandy. However, he sold the screenplay to RKO which later filmed it as The Locket (1946). Cronyn also made appearances in television, The Barbara Stanwyck Show, the Alfred Hitchcock Presents episodes "Kill With Kindness" (1956) and "The Impromptu Murder" (1958) and Hawaii Five-O episodes "Over Fifty? Steal" (1970) and "Odd Man In" (1971).

Cronyn starred with his second wife Jessica Tandy in a short-lived (1953–1954) radio series, The Marriage (based on their earlier Broadway play, The Fourposter), playing New York attorney Ben Marriott and his wife, former fashion buyer Liz, struggling with her switch to domestic life and their raising an awkward teenage daughter (future soap opera star Denise Alexander). The show was scheduled to move from radio to television, with Cronyn producing as well as acting in the show. However, Tandy suffered a miscarriage and the show's debut was delayed a week. The series, which was the first situation comedy broadcast in color, premiered in July 1954 to "warm and enthusiastic reviews"; eight episodes were aired.

The couple also appeared in many dramatic stage, film and television outings, including The Seventh Cross (1944), The Green Years (1946), The Gin Game (1977), Honky Tonk Freeway (1981), The World According to Garp (1982), Cocoon (1985), the television film Foxfire (1987), *batteries not included (1987), Cocoon: The Return (1988), To Dance with the White Dog (1993) and Camilla (1994).

Cronyn had an association with the Stratford Festival as a member of both the acting company and its board of governors. He played Shylock in The Merchant of Venice in 1976, and debuted his play Foxfire in 1980. The play would later move to Broadway (and won Tandy a Best Actress Tony award), and a film version was made in 1987.

In 1990 he won an Emmy award for his role in the TV Movie Age-Old Friends. His later appearances included the films The Pelican Brief (1993), Marvin's Room (1996) and the Showtime TV film 12 Angry Men (1997).

== Marriages and family ==
Cronyn's first marriage was to the philanthropist Emily Woodruff in late 1934 or early 1935. They shared a "lavender marriage" and never lived together. Woodruff insisted that the marriage remain a secret because of her lesbian relationships. They quietly divorced in 1936.

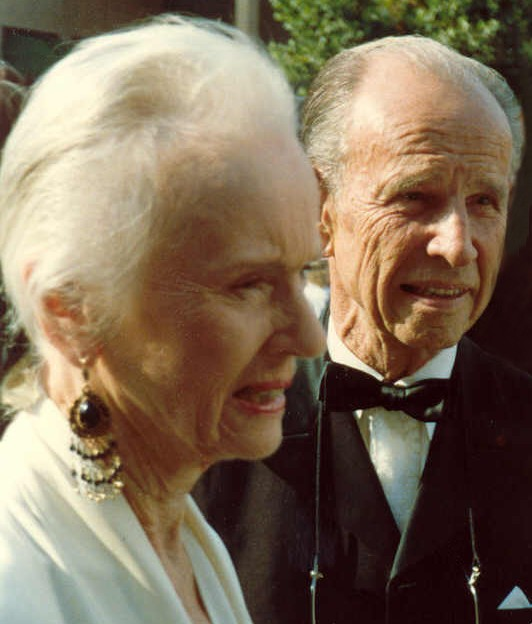
Cronyn and Jessica Tandy at the 1988 Emmy Awards

Cronyn married the actress Jessica Tandy in 1942. The couple had a daughter, Tandy, and a son, Christopher. Cronyn and Tandy lived in the Bahamas, then at a lakeside estate in Pound Ridge, New York, and, finally, in Easton, Connecticut. Jessica Tandy died in 1994, aged 85, from ovarian cancer.

Cronyn and his wife Tandy co-starred in the 1987 film Batteries Not Included.

After he was widowed, Cronyn married author/playwright Susan Cooper (with whom he had co-written Foxfire) in July 1996. His 1991 autobiography, which covered his life and career up to the mid-1960s, was titled A Terrible Liar (ISBN 0-688-12844-0). His intention to write a second volume never materialized.

== Death ==
Cronyn died on June 15, 2003, from prostate cancer aged 91.

== Honours ==
In 1979, Cronyn was inducted into the American Theater Hall of Fame. On July 11, 1988, he was appointed as an Officer of the Order of Canada, giving him the post nominal letters "OC" for life.

Cronyn was inducted into Canada's Walk of Fame in 1999. He also received the 125th Anniversary of the Confederation of Canada Medal in 1992 and the Canadian version of the Queen Elizabeth II Golden Jubilee Medal in 2002.

He was awarded an Honorary Doctor of Laws degree (LLD) by the University of Western Ontario on October 26, 1974. His wife, Jessica Tandy, was given the same degree on the same day.

== Filmography ==
=== Film ===
Year	Title	Role	Notes
1943	Shadow of a Doubt	Herbie Hawkins	
1943	Phantom of the Opera	Gerard	
1943	The Cross of Lorraine	Duval	
1944	Lifeboat	Stanley 'Sparks' Garrett	
1944	The Seventh Cross	Paul Roeder	
1944	Blonde Fever	Diner at Inn	Uncredited
1945	Main Street After Dark	Keller	
1945	Ziegfeld Follies	Monty	('A Sweepstakes Ticket')
1945	The Sailor Takes a Wife	Freddie Potts	
1946	A Letter for Evie	John Phineas McPherson	
1946	The Green Years	Papa Leckie	
1946	The Postman Always Rings Twice	Arthur Keats	
1946	The Secret Heart	Dinner Party Guest	Voice, Uncredited
1947	The Beginning or the End	Dr. J. Robert Oppenheimer	
1947	Brute Force	Captain Munsey	
1948	The Bride Goes Wild	John McGrath	
1949	Top o' the Morning	Hughie Devine	
1951	People Will Talk	Professor Rodney Elwell	
1956	Crowded Paradise	George Heath	
1960	Sunrise at Campobello	Louis Howe	
1963	Cleopatra	Sosigenes	
1964	Richard Burton's Hamlet	Polonius	
1969	The Arrangement	Arthur Houghton	
1969	Gaily, Gaily	Tom Grogan	
1970	There Was a Crooked Man...	Dudley Whinner	
1974	Conrack	Mr. Skeffington	
1974	The Parallax View	Bill Rintels	
1981	Honky Tonk Freeway	Sherm	
1981	Rollover	Maxwell Emery	
1982	The World According to Garp	Mr. Fields	
1984	Impulse	Dr. Carr	
1985	Brewster's Millions	Rupert Horn	
1985	Cocoon	Joe Finley	
1987	*batteries not included	Frank Riley	
1988	Cocoon: The Return	Joe Finley	
1993	The Pelican Brief	Justice Rosenberg	
1994	Camilla	Ewald	
1996	Marvin's Room	Marvin	
2001	Off Season	Sam Clausner	

=== Television ===
Year	Title	Role	Notes
1949	The Ford Theatre Hour	Hugo Barnstead	Episode: "Once Sunday Afternoon"
1949	Suspense	Dr. Violet	Episode: "Dr. Violet"
1950	The Ford Theatre Hour	Harry Binion	Episode: "Room Service"
1950	Suspense	Sig	2 episodes
1950	Pulitzer Prize Playhouse	Charles Ponzi	Episode: "The Ponzi Story"
1950	The Philco-Goodyear Television Playhouse	—N/a	Episode: "The Reluctant Landlord"
1953	Omnibus	Bartender	Episode: "Glory in the Flower"
1954	The Motorola Television Hour	Anthony Updyke	Episode: "The Family Man"
1954	The Marriage	Ben Marriott	8 episodes
1955	Producers' Showcase	Michael	Episode: "The Fourposter"
1955	Omnibus	Harold 'Mitch' Mitchell	Episode: "Advice to Bathers"
1955	The Philco-Goodyear Television Playhouse	Ben Marriott	Episode: "Christmas 'til Closing"
1956	The United States Steel Hour	Priam Farll	Episode: "The Great Adventure"
1956	Climax!	Reverend Mr. Muldoon	Episode: "The Fifth Wheel"
1956	Alfred Hitchcock Presents	Fitzhugh Oldham	Season 2 Episode 4: "Kill with Kindness"
1958	Alfred Hitchcock Presents	Henry Daw	Season 3 Episode 38: "The Impromptu Murder"
1959	The Moon and Sixpence	Dirk Stroeve	Television film
1959	A Doll's House	Nils Krogstad	Television film
1960	Juno and the Paycock	—N/a	Television film
1970–1971	Hawaii Five-O	Lewis Avery Filer	2 episodes
1981	The Gin Game	Weller Martin	Television film
1987	Foxfire	Hector Nations	Television film
1989	Day One	James F. Byrnes	Television film
1989	Age-Old Friends	John Cooper	Television film
1991	Christmas on Division Street	Cleveland Meriwether	Television film
1992	Broadway Bound	Ben	Television film
1993	To Dance with the White Dog	Robert Samuel Peek	Television film
1995	People: A Musical Celebration Of Diversity	Grandpa (voice)	Television film
1997	12 Angry Men	Juror #9	Television film
1997	Alone	John Webb	Television film
1998	Seasons of Love	Lonzo	Television film
1999	Sea People	Mr. John McRae	Television film
1999	Santa and Pete	Saint Nick	Television film
2000	Yesterday's Children	Old Sunny Sutton	Television film

=== Stage ===
- Hipper's Holiday – 1934
- High Tor – 1937
- There's Always a Breeze – 1938
- Escape This Night – 1938
- Off to Buffalo – 1939
- Three Sisters – 1939
- The Weak Link – 1940
- Retreat to Pleasure – 1940
- Mr. Big – 1941
- Portrait of a Madonna – 1946 (Director)
- The Survivors – 1948
- Now I Lay Me Down to Sleep – 1950
- Hilda Crane – 1950
- The Little Blue Light – 1951
- The Fourposter – 1951
- The Honeys – 1955
- A Day by the Sea – 1955
- The Egghead – 1957
- The Man in the Dog Suit – 1958
- Triple Play – 1959
- Big Fish, Little Fish – 1961
- Hamlet – 1964 (Tony Award for role of Polonius)
- The Physicists – 1964
- Slow Dance on the Killing Ground – 1964
- A Delicate Balance – 1966
- Promenade, All! – 1972
- Noël Coward in Two Keys – 1974
- The Gin Game – 1977 (performed, produced)
- Foxfire – 1982 (performed, wrote play and lyrics)
- The Petition – 1986

== Awards and nominations ==
Award	Year	Category	Work	Result
Academy Awards	1945	Best Supporting Actor	The Seventh Cross	Nominated
Golden Globe Awards	1993	Best Supporting Actor – Series, Miniseries or Television Film	Broadway Bound	Nominated
Primetime Emmy Awards	1984	Outstanding Writing for a Limited or Anthology Series or Movie	The Dollmaker	Nominated
Primetime Emmy Awards	1988	Outstanding Lead Actor in a Limited or Anthology Series or Movie	Foxfire	Nominated
Primetime Emmy Awards	1990	Outstanding Lead Actor in a Limited or Anthology Series or Movie	Age-Old Friends	Won
Primetime Emmy Awards	1992	Outstanding Lead Actor in a Limited or Anthology Series or Movie	Christmas on Division Street	Nominated
Primetime Emmy Awards	1992	Outstanding Supporting Actor in a Limited or Anthology Series or Movie	Broadway Bound	Won
Primetime Emmy Awards	1994	Outstanding Lead Actor in a Limited or Anthology Series or Movie	To Dance with the White Dog	Won
Primetime Emmy Awards	1998	Outstanding Supporting Actor in a Limited or Anthology Series or Movie	12 Angry Men	Nominated
Daytime Emmy Awards	2000	Outstanding Performer in Children's Programming	Sea People	Nominated
Daytime Emmy Awards	2002	Outstanding Performer in Children's Programming	Off Season	Nominated
Daytime Emmy Awards	2005	Outstanding Performer in a Children/Youth/Family Special	A Separate Peace	Nominated
Screen Actors Guild Awards	1996	Outstanding Performance by a Cast in a Motion Picture	Marvin's Room	Nominated
Writers Guild of America Awards	1985	Best Adapted Drama Anthology	The Dollmaker	Won
Saturn Awards	1986	Best Actor	Cocoon	Nominated
Saturn Awards	1990	Best Actor	Cocoon: The Return	Nominated
American Comedy Awards	1992	Funniest Male Performer in a TV Special – Network, Cable or Syndication	Broadway Bound	Nominated
CableACE Awards	1991	Best Actor in a Movie or Miniseries	Age-Old Friends	Won
Humanitas Prize	1985	90 Minute or Longer Network or Syndicated Television	The Dollmaker	Won
Tony Awards	1961	Best Actor in a Play	Big Fish, Little Fish	Nominated
Tony Awards	1964	Best Featured Actor in a Play	Hamlet	Won
Tony Awards	1965	Best Producer (Dramatic)	Slow Dance on the Killing Ground	Nominated
Tony Awards	1967	Best Actor in a Play	A Delicate Balance	Nominated
Tony Awards	1978	Best Play	The Gin Game	Nominated
Tony Awards	1978	Best Actor in a Play	The Gin Game	Nominated
Tony Awards	1986	Best Actor in a Play	The Petition	Nominated
Tony Awards	1994	Lifetime Achievement Award	—N/a	Honored
Drama Desk Awards	1978	Outstanding Actor in a Play	The Gin Game	Nominated
Drama Desk Awards	1986	Drama Desk Special Award	—N/a	Honored
Drama League Awards	1961	Distinguished Performance	Big Fish, Little Fish	Won
Obie Awards	1973	Distinguished Performance by an Actor	Krapp's Last Tape	Won

== Radio appearances ==
Year	Program	Episode/source
1945	Suspense	"Double Entry"
1946	Suspense	"Blue Eyes"
1946	Suspense	The One Who Got Away
1952	Philip Morris Playhouse	One Sunday Afternoon

== Book ==
- A Terrible Liar: A Memoir (1991) – ISBN 0-688-12844-0
