= Hume Cronyn Memorial Observatory =

Astronomical observatory in Ontario, Canada

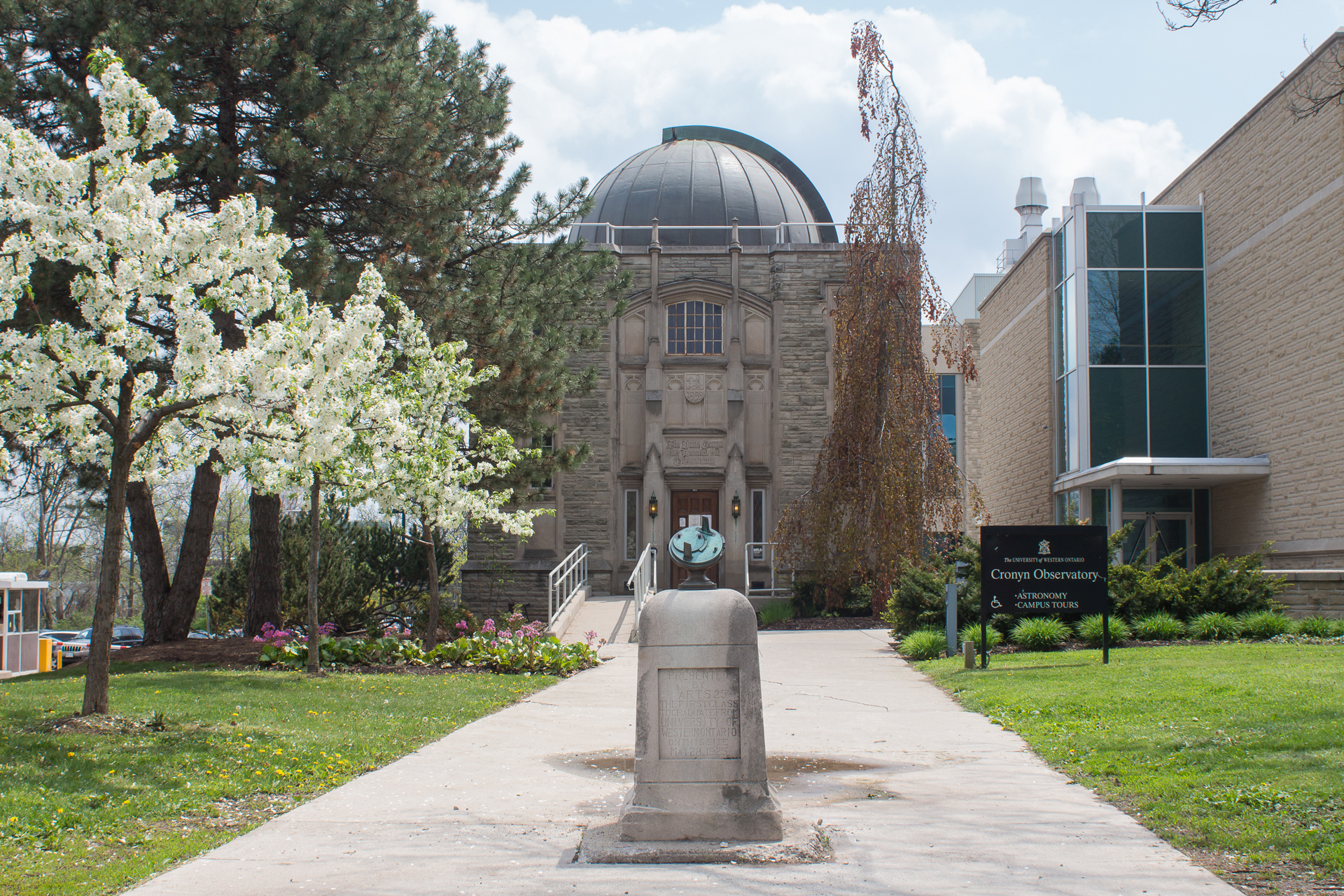
- Cronyn Observatory
- Alternative names: Cronyn Observatory
- Organization: University of Western Ontario
- Location: London, Canada
- Coordinates: 43°00′20″N 81°16′31″W
- Altitude: 251 m (823 ft)
- Established: 1940
- Website: Official Cronyn Observatory Website

Telescopes
- Telescope 1: 254 mm refractor
- Telescope 2: 203 mm Schmidt camera
- Telescope 3: 300 mm Cassegrain reflector
- Location within Ontario
- Related media on Commons

The Hume Cronyn Memorial Observatory is a public astronomical observatory located on the campus of the University of Western Ontario, in London, Ontario, Canada.

== History ==
When local lawyer, businessman, and member of federal parliament Hume Blake Cronyn died in 1933, his widow, Frances Amelia Cronyn (granddaughter of John Kinder Labatt) approached the University of Western Ontario with the idea of a memorial for her late husband. Mathematics and Astronomy professor Harold Kingston suggested that the university was interested in building an astronomical observatory. The result was the construction a new $40,000 (equivalent to $925,070 in 2025) observatory on the university campus, funded by Mrs. Cronyn, and named in honour of her late husband. The grand opening was held on October 25, 1940.

== Facilities ==
=== Building and dome ===
The building is a stone structure, being 31 feet by 45 feet in horizontal dimension, made of Credit Valley Limestone, and trimmed with Indiana Sandstone. The building was designed by local architect O. Roy Moore, and built by the Putherbough Company. The dome was fabricated by Perkin Elmer Corporation in New York, shipped in pieces, and assembled on site.

=== Telescopes ===
==== The 254 mm refractor ====
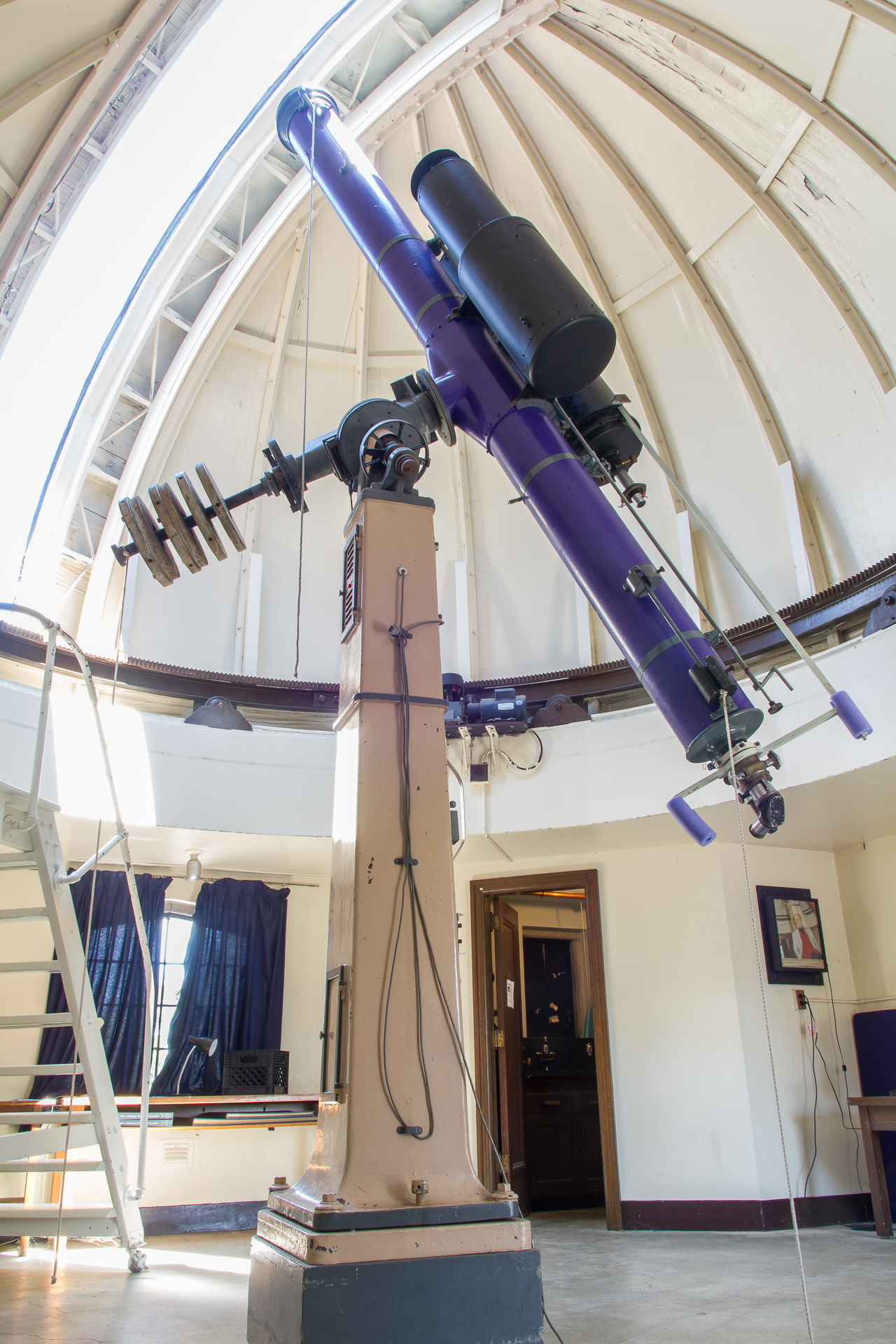
The purple refractor

The brass refractor telescope, finders, German equatorial mount, and pier were purchased from Perkin Elmer Corporation of New York for the sum of $7500 CDN. The objective is a crown and flint achromatic lens, the glass having been poured by Chance Brothers of England. The (then) U.S. firm Bausch and Lomb was first contracted to pour the glass for the objective lens, but because of the war effort was not able to fulfill its commitment. The best guess is that the lens was ground and polished by Halley Mogey (private family communication), the first employee of Perkin Elmer Corporation and son of famed telescope maker William Mogey. The telescope tube is brass, having a focal length of 4386mm, which yields a speed of f/17.2. The telescope is fitted with 25mm and 90mm finders.

==== The 203 mm Schmidt camera ====
When the large refractor was shipped to Canada, Perkin Elmer included the Schmidt camera at no extra charge, even though it was apparently not originally ordered. It is said that because of the war effort, Perkin Elmer was shifting its focus to military contracts and hence stopped its production of retail telescopes. The telescope is a classic Schmidt camera, having a 203 mm diameter corrector plate, with a 300 mm diameter spherical mirror (an 8"/12" design). A small sliding door in the side of the instrument allows the loading of a circular piece of photographic film, mounted in a film holder. The provenance of this camera is presently unknown. James Gilbert Baker of Harvard University was a consultant for Perkin Elmer in 1940 in which year he developed his own version of the camera, to be known as the Baker-Schmidt camera. He may well have had his hands on this particular instrument while he was a junior fellow at Harvard University at the time Perkin Elmer was founded in 1937 incorporated in Dec. 1939)

==== The 300 mm Cassegrain reflector ====
This telescope was purchased by William H. Wehlau in 1958 and was installed onto the refractor for the purpose of extending the photometric capabilities of the observatory. A new photometer was constructed and first deployed in 1960. The telescope has a 300 mm diameter parabolic mirror and has a focal length of 5232 mm, yielding a speed of f/17.2. The manufacturer of this instrument is not known.

==== Gibbs Heliochronometer ====
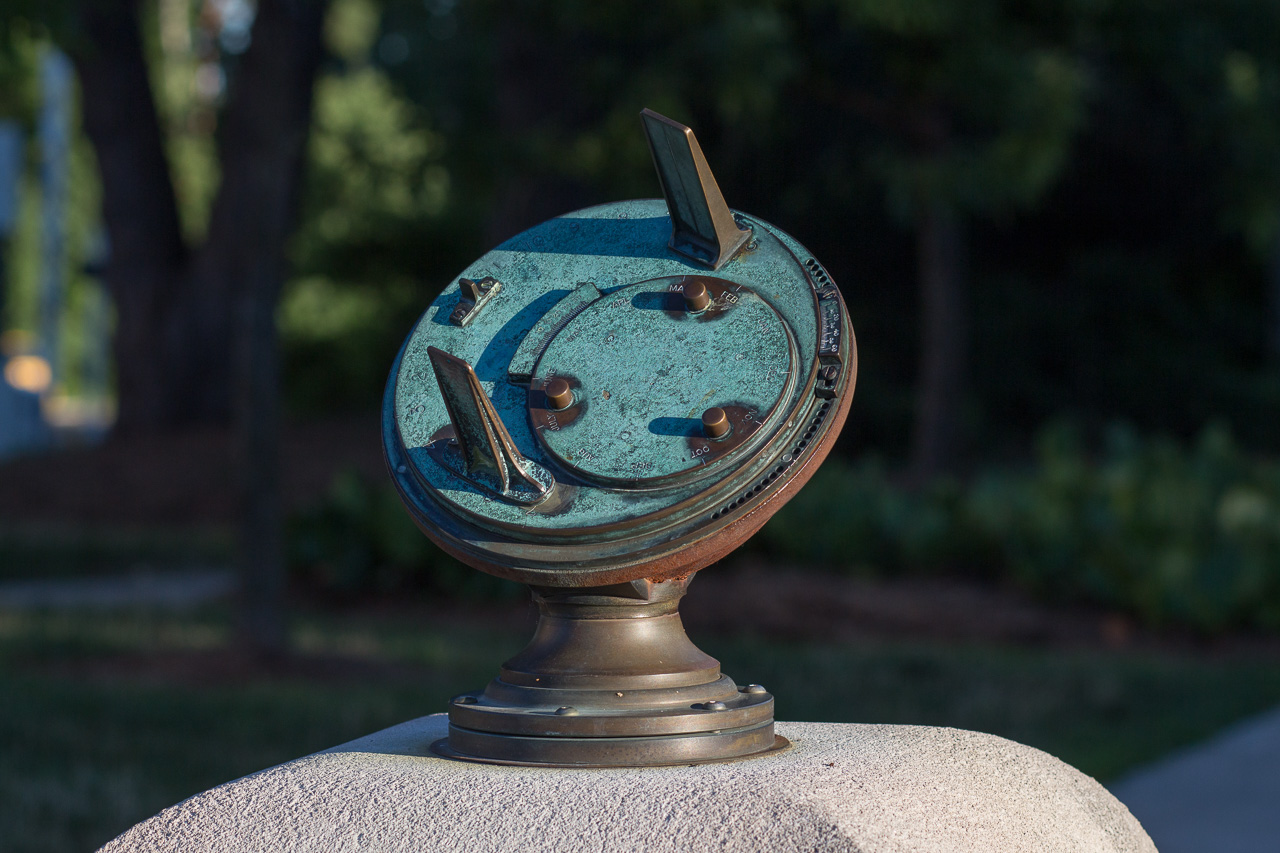
Gibbs Heliochronometer

In 1906 astronomer and engineer George James Gibbs applied for a patent for what he called a "Universal Equinoctial Mean Time Heliochronometer", basically a fancy sundial. In the same year he formed a partnership with Pilkington to sell the instrument as the Pilkington-Gibbs Heliochronometer. About 1,000 were made. The instrument at Western is stamped No. 953. A cam device on the instrument takes into account the equation of time, thereby converting local solar time to within about a minute of mean solar time.

This instrument, along with a Ginkgo tree were presented to the university by the Arts Class of 1925, the first class to graduate from the newly finished University College building. The tree and heliochronometer were originally placed on the northeast lawn of University College. The heliochronometer was subsequently moved in front of Cronyn Observatory in 1952. After also being moved, the Ginkgo tree now thrives in its original location, turning a blazing yellow in about the first or second week of November.

=== Classroom ===
Building renovations of 1996 resulted in the replacement of the main floor foyer and two offices with a modern classroom that can seat approximately 70 people.

=== History rooms ===
For the celebration of the 75th anniversary in 2015, part of the basement of the observatory was converted into one 1940 historical period room and one science demonstration room. Since that time a 1967 Elginfield Observatory room as well as a William Colgrove historic workshop have been added. These are all open to the public during public events.

== Research ==
While the observatory's prime vision was as an educational and outreach facility, some very important research publications came out of work done with the telescopes and other equipment at the observatory.

=== Variable stars ===
The important research work of William H. Wehlau, staff, and students could not be summarized better than the obituary written by Bill's last graduating PhD student, Professor Jaymie Matthews, when he wrote, after Bill's sudden death in 1995, "Bill laid the foundation for many of the astronomical period-searching techniques we take for granted today. His 1964 paper with Kam-Ching Leung (ApJ 139, 843) on the multiple periods of Delta Delphini was the first published use of Fourier integral techniques to interpret stellar light curves. The quality and quantity of data (25 nights of three-colour photometry) and sophistication of the fit (a sum of 6 cosines) would not be out of place in the modern literature on asteroseismology of Delta Scuti variables (see his paper in these Proceedings). In the next decade, Bill again was a pioneer; this time in stellar surface imaging through inversion of spectral line-profile variations into abundance and temperature maps of Ap stars. Such techniques are now widely used to analyse high-degree NRP in rapid rotators. By the 1980s, Bill's diverse interests in pulsation and spectral peculiarity converged in the rapidly oscillating Ap stars. He played key roles in the first detection of velocity oscillations in an roAp (rotating Ap) star and in translating optical-IR photometry of roAp pulsations into the first empirical atmospheric temperature profile for a star other than the Sun."

=== Iris photometry ===
A locally modified Becker iris photometer was housed in the kitchenette in the basement of the observatory. In 1964 Amelia F. Wehlau discovered a 1938 nova while using this photometer to study photographic plates of Messier 14 that had been taken by Helen Sawyer Hogg. The plates were taken with the 74" telescope at the David Dunlap Observatory and 72" telescope at the Dominion Astrophysical Observatory between the years 1932 and 1963. The nova was only found on the 1938 plates taken at the David Dunlap Observatory.

=== Photometry ===
A photometer was deployed on the 254 mm (10") refractor roughly between the years 1957 and 1960. The first research from this instrument was the study of the brightness of Comet Arend-Roland by William and Amelia Wehlau, using data from 1957 and 1958. This combination of instruments was also used in the published search for variability in the stars Gamma Equulei and HD 149728, using 1958 and 1959 data from the refracting telescope.

In 1960 a 300 mm (12") Cassegrain reflector (purchased in 1958) came online with a locally built photometer, and this combination of equipment supplanted the photometer on the refractor. The first published use was in the successful search for light variablility in the star HD 173650, published in 1962 and using data from the summer of 1960. In later work using data from this instrument, William Wehlau pioneered Fourier techniques of detecting multiple periodicities in stars. The ground breaking work was the paper "The Multiple Periodicity of Delta Delphinii", Ap.J., Vol. 139, April 1964, co-authored with graduate student Kam-Ching Leung.

=== Post 1969 ===
With the opening of the Elginfield Observatory in 1969 the use of Cronyn Observatory for research observing diminished. The last photometric observations published using Cronyn Observatory data was in 1995 in a paper by J. Bax, W.H. Wehlau and S. Sharpe. However, very active machine and electronics shops based in Cronyn Observatory supported the research work of Elginfield Observatory until the 1.2m telescope at Elginfield was mothballed in 2010.

== Public outreach ==
The prime vision of this observatory was as an educational facility for the university and the local community. Since its inception, Cronyn Observatory has held "public nights" for the community members, normally running every Saturday evening throughout the summer and currently also running twice a month throughout winter. Large groups can also book a day or evening visit through the "Exploring the Stars Program", and finally private events for small groups are also available

== See also ==
- List of astronomical observatories
