= Jack Irvine =

Canadian politician

- Official 1966 portrait

Member of Parliament for London
- In office April 8, 1963 – June 25, 1968
- Preceded by: Ernest Halpenny
- Succeeded by: Judd Buchanan

Alderman for London City Council
- In office 1960–1963

Personal details
- Born: 26 January 1912 Wolfe Island, Ontario
- Died: 20 July 1996 (aged 84) Simcoe, Ontario
- Party: Progressive Conservative
- Spouse: Doris Virginia Seeley (married July 3, 1937 - June 7, 1967)
- Children: John H. Irvine
- Parents: Byron Irvine (father); Rachella Niles (mother)
- Education: Kingston Collegiate and Vocational Institute, Queen's University
- Profession: merchant

John Alfred (Jack) Irvine (26 January 1912 – 20 July 1996) was a Progressive Conservative party member of the House of Commons of Canada. He was a merchant by career. Irvine ran Irvine Appliances.

Irvine was born at Wolfe Island, Ontario. He married Doris Seeley in 1937, and moved to Lambeth, London, Ontario in 1950. He entered municipal politics in 1959, becoming an alderman for the London, Ontario city government.

Irvine left local politics in 1963 and was elected to the House of Commons at the London riding in the 1963 general election, then re-elected there in the 1965. After electoral district boundary changes in the late 1960s, Irvine campaigned at London West for the 1968 federal election but lost to Judd Buchanan of the Liberal party.

Irvine died at a nursing home in Simcoe, Ontario in July 1996.

1963 Canadian federal election: London
| Party | Candidate | Votes |
|---|---|---|
| Progressive Conservative | Jack Irvine | 15,700 |
| Liberal | Clarence M. Peterson | 14,262 |
| New Democratic | Paddy O'Brien | 3,335 |
| Social Credit | Lloyd H. Alford | 599 |

1965 Canadian federal election: London
| Party | Candidate | Votes |
|---|---|---|
| Progressive Conservative | Jack Irvine | 13,763 |
| Liberal | Margaret Fullerton | 11,164 |
| New Democratic | Clayton Fee | 4,412 |
| Independent | Albert W. Plumb | 422 |
| Communist | Thomas Morris | 271 |
