= John William Little =

Canadian politician, businessman (1848–1913)

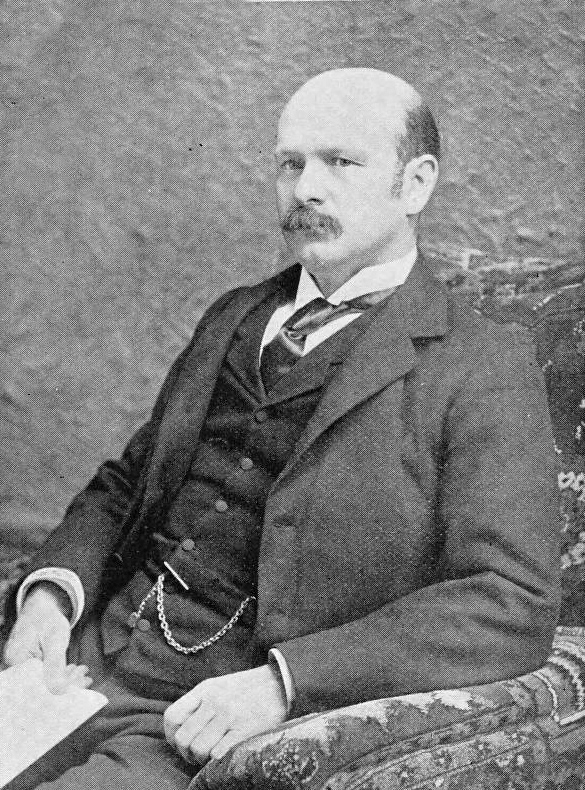
- Little, c. 1897
- Born: June 18, 1848; Montreal, Quebec
- Died: July 22, 1913 (aged 65)
- Other names: J. W.

Colonel John William Little was a businessman and mayor of London, Ontario, Canada from 1895 to 1897. He was born in Montreal, Quebec, Canada on June 18, 1848, the first-born child of Thomas Little and Rebecca Robinson.

He was raised and educated in Montreal. In 1875, he moved to London, Ontario and joined his uncle in a partnership that became Robinson, Little. The company rapidly expanded throughout Ontario, the North-West Territories and British Columbia, buying out, in 1887, J.B. Laing & Co., in 1890, John Birrell & Co., both of London and in 1908 they acquired Greenshields Western Ltd. He was also vice-chair of the Board of Governors of the University of Western Ontario, where he was a major influence in re-organization of the university when in 1908 it became a civic enterprise and also non-denominational. His generosity made possible the building of a stadium for both sports and convocations, which was completed in 1929 and named in his honour the J.W. Little Memorial Stadium.

He served on the Board of Water commissioners, was a director of the London and Southeastern Railway and a vice chairman of the Western Fair. In 1885 he joined the Seventh Regiment, Canadian Fusiliers as a Captain and by 1902 took command as Lieutenant-Colonel. He died July 22, 1913.

== Family ==
He had seven sons. His first son, Arthur T. Little, was chair of the Board of Governors and oversaw the construction of J.W. Little Memorial Stadium at UWO. Herbert Melville Little, was a physician and surgeon. Walter Hartley Little was a businessman and sportsman. The third son was Canadian senator Edgar Sydney Little, businessman, gentleman-farmer and politician. Harold Robert Little, became an architect and engineer. George Wilfred Little, was a businessman, sportsman and soldier. Ernest Victor Little, was a businessman.
