= John Sackville Labatt =

Canadian businessman

John Labatt
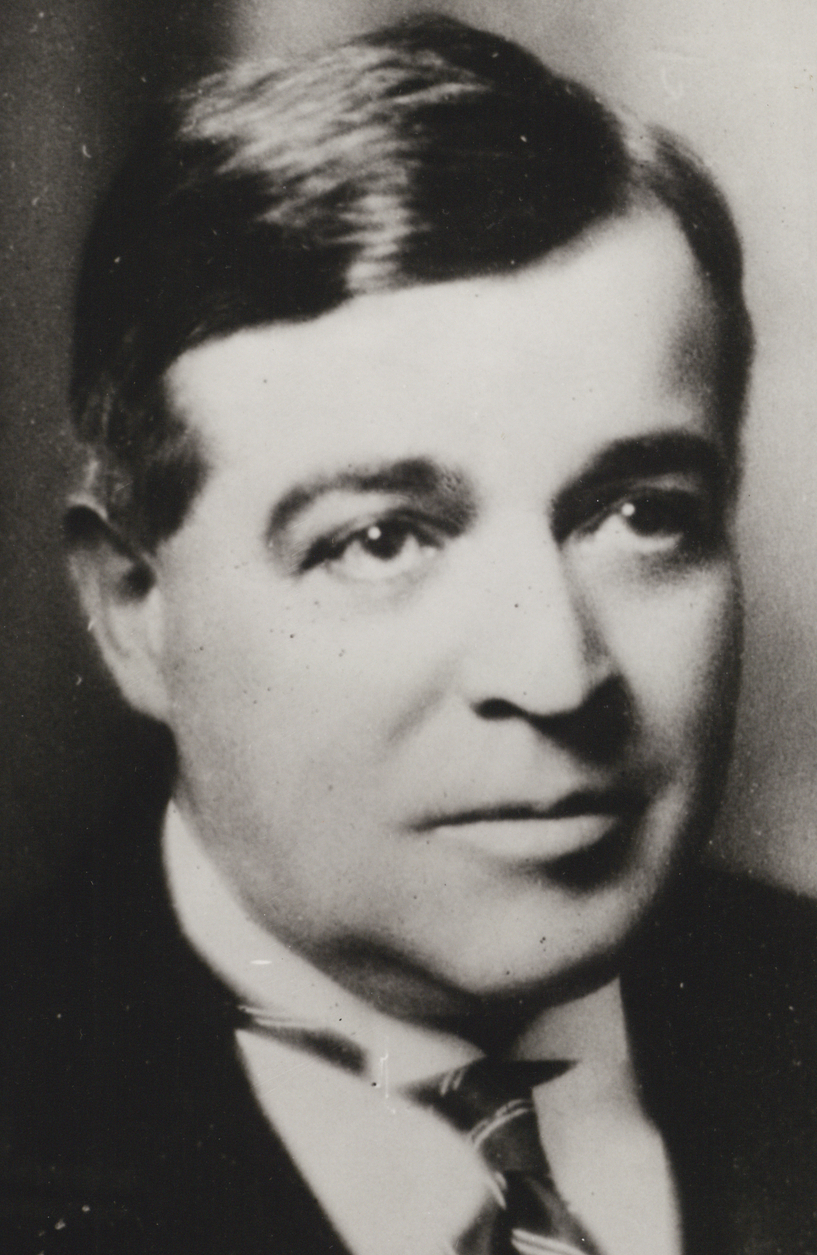
- Born: John Sackville Labatt; March 10, 1880; Canada
- Died: July 8, 1952 (aged 72)
- Education: Trinity College School, McGill University
- Occupations: businessman, Labatt Brewing Company president
- Known for: kidnapped (1934)
- Spouse: Elizabeth Anne Lynch (m. 1926)
- Children: 3, including Arthur Labatt
- Father: John Labatt

John Sackville Labatt (March 10, 1880 – July 8, 1952) was a Canadian businessman who was the president of the Labatt Brewing Company and a prominent kidnapping victim.

== Early life ==
He was one of nine children of John Labatt, and he was educated at Trinity College School and McGill University. It was he and his brother, Hugh Francis Labatt, who took up management of the firm upon their father's death in 1915. John Sackville became president of the company, and he held that position for several decades. In 1926, he married Elizabeth Anne Lynch. With her, he had three children: John Pridham, Arthur and Mary.

== Kidnapping ==
On August 14, 1934, Labatt was returning to his office in London, Ontario, from his cottage on Lake Huron near Sarnia, Ontario. Soon after leaving the cottage, his car was forced to stop by another vehicle, and Labatt was abducted at gunpoint. He was forced to write a letter to his brother Hugh, telling him to go to the Royal York Hotel in Toronto to await further instructions. Labatt was then taken to a cottage on Lake Muskoka, where he was blindfolded and chained to a bed.

The kidnappers were Michael Francis McCardell (known as Three-Fingered Abe), Jack Bannon, Albert Pegram and Russell Knowles. Knowles drove Labatt's car to London and, after placing the note inside it, sent word to Hugh Labatt about its location. Hugh proceeded to the Royal York Hotel and began gathering money to pay the ransom of CA$150,000 (equivalent to $3.4 million in 2025). Word got out and generated a media furor; reporters massed at the Royal York and in London.

This caused the kidnappers to panic, and they decided to release Labatt; he was unchained from the bed after three days of captivity. They drove him to Toronto and released him on St. Clair Avenue in the Forest Hill neighbourhood. They gave him cab fare and then fled. Labatt travelled to the Royal York, to meet his brother. It took some moments for the gathered crowd of reporters to realize who had just walked in the door, but when it was revealed, pandemonium erupted.

Three of the kidnappers were later arrested and sentenced to fifteen years in jail. The fourth was killed in the United States soon after. While physically unharmed, the experience deeply affected Labatt, and he became a near recluse for the rest of his life.

== See also ==
- List of kidnappings
