= Gordon Stronach =

Canadian politician

Mayor of London, Ontario
- In office 1 January 1961 – 1 January 1968
- Preceded by: Allan Johnston
- Succeeded by: Herbert McClure

Personal details
- Born: Frank Gordon Stronach; 1908 London, England
- Died: January 1, 1968 (aged 59–60)
- Profession: Police officer

Frank Gordon Stronach was a Canadian politician, who served as mayor of London, Ontario from 1961 to 1968.

Stronach, a retired 26-year veteran of the Royal Canadian Mounted Police, was serving as police chief in the suburban London Township, which was slated for annexation into the city on 1 January 1961. He ran for mayor in the 1960 municipal election after being unable to negotiate a position with the London Police Service, into which the township force was to be amalgamated. He won over incumbent mayor Allan Johnston by a narrow margin of 174 votes, triggering a recount which confirmed his victory.

Johnston ran against Stronach again in the 1962 municipal election, which Stronach won by a wider 4,900-vote margin. In the 1964 election, Stronach was returned over two candidates including a 21-year-old University of Western Ontario student named Theo Wolder, who later went on to become a Judge of the Ontario Court of Justice; in the 1966 election, he won reelection to a three-year term by acclamation.

He ran as an Ontario Liberal Party candidate for London South in the 1967 provincial election, but lost to incumbent MPP John White.

He died in office on 1 January 1968, and was succeeded as mayor by Herbert McClure in a council vote on 8 January.
