= Park Manross =

Canadian politician

Member of Parliament for London
- In office June 1945 – June 1949
- Preceded by: Allan Johnston
- Succeeded by: Alex Jeffery

Personal details
- Born: Park Arthur Manross; 10 June 1895 Pennsylvania, United States
- Died: 24 January 1951 (aged 55) London, Ontario, Canada
- Party: Progressive Conservative
- Spouse(s): Letitia Swanwick m. 22 June 1922
- Profession: advertising consultant, industrialist, sales and marketing consultant

Park Arthur Manross (10 June 1895 – 24 January 1951) was a Progressive Conservative party member of the House of Commons of Canada. He was born in United States and became an advertising consultant, industrialist and sales and marketing consultant by career.

Manross was born in Pennsylvania, United States and served in the military in World War I. He moved to London to found the Ruggles Motor Truck Company then acquired the assets of soft drink firm National Dry, developing this into a successful business. He also established the Wishing Well Products company.

He was first elected to Parliament at the London riding in the 1945 general election then defeated at the 1949 election by Alex Jeffery of the Liberal party.

Manross died in London, Ontario at Victoria Hospital on the afternoon of 24 January 1951, leaving his wife.

1945 Canadian federal election: London
| Party | Candidate | Votes |
|---|---|---|
| Progressive Conservative | Park Manross | 16,766 |
| Liberal | Allan Johnston | 13,421 |
| Co-operative Commonwealth | Everett Orlan Hall | 4,901 |
| Labor–Progressive | Arthur Mould | 225 |

1949 Canadian federal election: London
| Party | Candidate | Votes |
|---|---|---|
| Liberal | Alex Jeffery | 16,427 |
| Progressive Conservative | Park Manross | 14,988 |
| Co-operative Commonwealth | Everett O. Hall | 4,532 |
