= Hume Cronyn (politician) =

Canadian politician

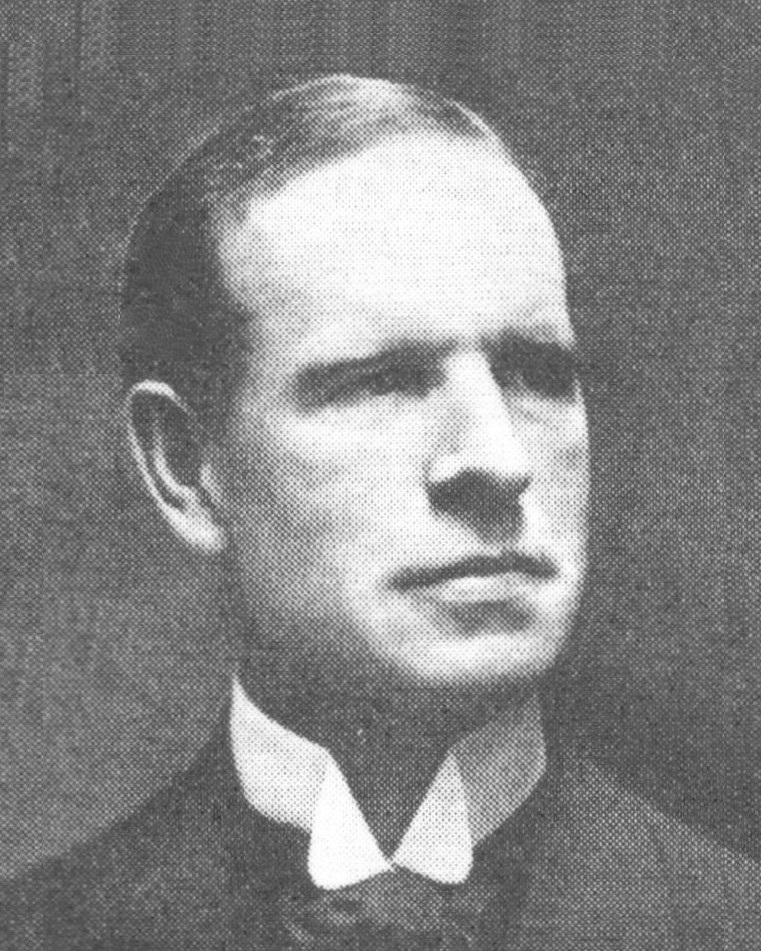

Member of Parliament for London
- In office 17 December 1917 – 5 December 1921
- Preceded by: William Gray
- Succeeded by: John Franklin White

Personal details
- Born: 28 August 1864 London, Canada West
- Died: 19 June 1933 (aged 68)
- Party: Unionist
- Spouse: Frances Amelia Labatt (m. 1892)
- Children: 5, including Hume
- Education: University of Toronto
- Profession: Lawyer

Military service
- Allegiance: Canada
- Branch/service: Canadian Militia; 7th Regiment Fusiliers
- Rank: Major
- Unit: Queen's Own Rifles of Canada
- Battles/wars: North-West Rebellion

Hume Blake Cronyn Sr. (28 August 1864 – 19 June 1933) was a Canadian politician and lawyer.

== Biography ==
Born in London, Canada West, the son of Verschoyle Cronyn (who was the son of Benjamin Cronyn) and Sophia Eliza Blake (who was the daughter of William Hume Blake), Cronyn was educated at Dr. Tassie's grammar school in Galt, Ontario and at the University of Toronto where he received a Bachelor of Arts degree and a Bachelor of Law degree in 1889. He was called to the Ontario bar in 1889 and practised law in London. In 1907 he was appointed general manager of The Huron and Erie Mortgage Corporation. He was also a General Manager of the Canada Trust Company and a Director of the Mutual Life Assurance Company of Canada.

While at the University of Toronto he enlisted in The Queen's Own Rifles of Canada and served during the North-West Rebellion of 1885 and fought in the Battle of Cut Knife. Afterwards he joined the 7th Fusiliers, and served as Major from 1899 to 1907.

He was elected to the House of Commons as a Unionist in the riding of London in the 1917 election.

An Anglican, he married Frances Amelia Labatt, second daughter of John Labatt, in 1892. He had three sons and two daughters, including Hume Cronyn the actor.

Asteroid (12050) Humecronyn is named in his honour.

The Hume Cronyn Memorial Observatory at The University of Western Ontario was built in his memory by his widow Frances Amelia Cronyn (née Labatt).

1917 Canadian federal election: London
Party	Candidate	Votes
Government (Unionist)	Hume Cronyn	11,136
Opposition (Laurier Liberals)	George Sutton Gibbons	6,783

Parliament of Canada
Preceded by William Gray	Member of Parliament for London; 1917–1921	Succeeded by John Franklin White
