= Charles Somerville =

Canadian manufacturer and politician (1856–1931)

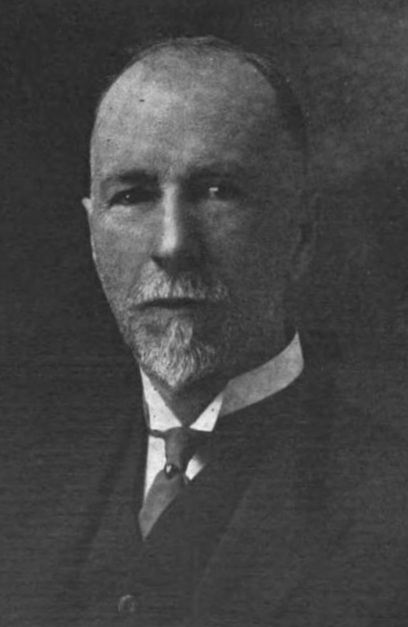

Mayor of London, Ontario
- In office 1918–1919

Personal details
- Born: Charles Ross Somerville; September 9, 1856 Morton, Canada West
- Died: March 28, 1931 (aged 74) New York, New York
- Spouses: May Maddocks (died 1896) Christina Wilson (m. 1891)
- Children: 2
- Occupation: Manufacturer, politician

Charles Ross Somerville (September 9, 1856 – March 28, 1931) was a manufacturer and politician in Ontario, Canada. He served as mayor of London, Ontario from 1918 to 1919.

== Biography ==
The son of John Brown Somerville and Elizabeth McKinnon, he was born in Morton, Leeds County and was educated in Goderich. In 1888, he established himself in business in London as a manufacturer of paper boxes and confections. Somerville retired from business in 1909, after which he spent time travelling.

His first wife, May Maddocks, died in 1896. He remarried to Christina Wilson on July 1, 1891, and they had two sons, Kenneth and Ross Somerville

Somerville served on the public school board and as chairman on the board of governors for the University of Western Ontario. He ran unsuccessfully for the London seat in the Canadian House of Commons in 1921 as a Liberal, losing to John Franklin White. He was also a member of the Chorazan Lodge.

Somerville Limited was purchased in 1910 by J. K. and D. H. McDermid and expanded over time, with five plants split between London (two), Walkerville, Strathroy and Neustad. In 1944, the company was taken over by W. Garfield Weston; four of the five plants were replaced by a larger facility in Crumlin, Ontario and seven additional plants were built by 1969. He died in New York City after an illness in 1931 and was buried in London.

1921 Canadian federal election: London
| Party | Candidate | Votes |
|---|---|---|
| Conservative | John Franklin White | 9,730 |
| Liberal | Charles Somerville | 7,974 |
| Progressive | Arthur Mould | 4,252 |
