= James Harshaw Fraser =

Canadian politician

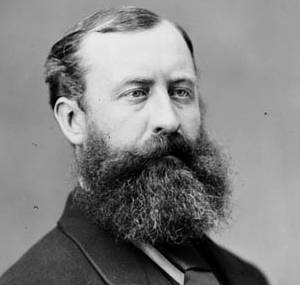
James Harshaw Fraser Source: Library and Archives Canada

James Harshaw Fraser (1841 – July 28, 1899) was a Canadian lawyer and political figure in Ontario. He represented London in the House of Commons of Canada from 1875 to 1878 as a Liberal-Conservative member.

He was born in Westminster, Canada West, the son of a Major Fraser, and was educated in London. He studied law with William Elliott, who later became a judge, and was called to the bar in 1867. Fraser married Sophia Robinson Elliott. He practised law in London, Ontario. He was first elected in an 1875 by-election held after John Walker was unseated. Fraser died in Gravenhurst at the age of 58.

His son William Elliot Fraser died while serving as a surgeon in the merchant navy during World War II and is buried in Northern Ireland.

By-election on 18 February 1875 Walker unseated, 9 September 1874
Party	Candidate	Votes
Liberal–Conservative	James Harshaw Fraser	1,228
Unknown	Samuel Peters	1,100
