= Allan Johnston (politician) =

Canadian politician

Joseph Johnston

Mayor of London, Ontario
- In office 1939–1940
- Preceded by: Thomas Kingsmill
- Succeeded by: William Heaman

Member of Parliament for London
- In office March 1940 – June 1945
- Preceded by: Robert James Manion
- Succeeded by: Park Manross

Mayor of London, Ontario
- In office 1958–1960
- Preceded by: Ray Dennis
- Succeeded by: Gordon Stronach

Personal details
- Born: Joseph Allan Johnston; 28 September 1904 London, Ontario, Canada
- Died: 15 May 1974 (aged 69)
- Party: Liberal
- Profession: merchant

Joseph Allan Johnston (28 September 1904 – 15 May 1974) was a Liberal party member of the House of Commons of Canada. He was born in London, Ontario, where he was alderman from 1933 to 1935 and mayor from 1938 to 1940. He also became a merchant by career.

Johnston attended public and secondary schools in London. He operated a typewriter business and became a London city alderman from 1933 to 1935, and was the city's mayor from 1938 to 1940.

Johnston was first elected to Parliament at the London riding in the 1940 general election. After one term in the House of Commons, Johnston was defeated by Park Manross in the 1945 election.

1940 Canadian federal election: London
Party	Candidate	Votes
Liberal	Allan Johnston	15,824
National Government	Thomas Kingsmill	12,534
Co-operative Commonwealth	Everett Orlan Hall	3,762
