= John Carling =

Canadian politician (1828–1911)

The Honourable Sir John Carling PC KCMG
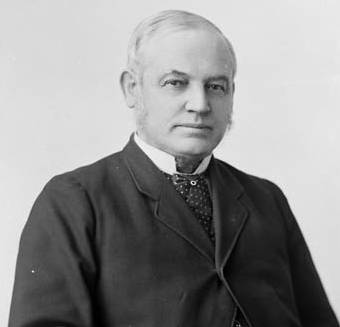
- Carling in 1885

Canadian Senator from Ontario
- In office 1896–1911
- Appointed by: Mackenzie Bowell

Member of Parliament for London
- In office 1867–1874
- Preceded by: Riding established
- Succeeded by: John Walker
- In office 1878–1891
- Preceded by: James Harshaw Fraser
- Succeeded by: Charles S. Hyman
- In office 1892–1896
- Preceded by: Charles S. Hyman
- Succeeded by: Thomas Beattie

Member of the Ontario Legislative Assembly for London
- In office 1867–1872
- Preceded by: Riding established
- Succeeded by: William Ralph Meredith

Personal details
- Born: 23 January 1828 London, Upper Canada
- Died: 6 November 1911 (aged 83) London, Ontario, Canada
- Party: Conservative
- Other political affiliations: Liberal-Conservative; Conservative (Ontario)
- Spouse: Hannah Dalton (m. 1849)
- Children: 8
- Relatives: Thomas Carling (father); William Carling (brother)
- Occupation: Businessman
- Cabinet: Postmaster General (May 23, 1882 – September 24, 1885 and July 11, 1888 – August 5, 1888); Minister of Agriculture (September 25, 1885 June 6, 1891 and June 16, 1891 November 24, 1892)

Sir John Carling PC KCMG (January 23, 1828 – November 6, 1911) was a Canadian politician and businessman. The Carling family and its descendants later resided in Ottawa, Montreal, Halifax, Brockville, London, Toronto and Windsor in Canada, as well as Jersey in the Channel Islands.

== Life and career ==
John Carling was the son of farmer Thomas Carling, who emigrated from Etton in Yorkshire, England. Arriving to Upper Canada in 1818, the family moved to London in 1839, where Thomas founded the Carling Brewery in 1843 using a recipe from his native Yorkshire. In 1849, the brewery was turned over to John and his brother William.

His political career began at the municipal level of government, in London, Ontario; then in 1858, he was elected to the Legislative Assembly of the Province of Canada, representing London. Re-elected to the same constituency in 1862, he briefly served in John A. Macdonald's Cabinet as Receiver General, before the government fell.

After Confederation in 1867, Carling represented London in both provincial and federal legislatures until such practice was made illegal in 1872. In the 1871 provincial election, he defeated former London mayor Francis Evans Cornish.

From 1878 to 1891, he served in the House of Commons as a Conservative Member of Parliament (MP), holding the position of 7th Postmaster General from 1882 to 1885, and Minister of Agriculture from 1885 to 1891. In this position, he established the Ontario Agricultural College and the Central Experimental Farm near Ottawa. In 1888, he simultaneously held the position of Postmaster General for a second time, briefly.

After losing the 1891 election to Charles S. Hyman, he was appointed to the Senate by Prime Minister John A. Macdonald. However, the election was disputed and declared void, thus Carling resigned from the Senate in order to run in a by-election in 1892, which he won. He served in the House of Commons until just before the 1896 election, when he resigned and was re-appointed to the Senate.

Meanwhile, Carling remained active in London affairs, using his position in the federal government to influence politics and business. In 1875, Carling and his brother William built a new Carling Brewery, and an even larger one was built after the first burned down in 1879. The brewery was one of the largest in Canada, and it rivaled the production of fellow London brewery Labatt.

Carling also ensured that the Great Western Railway, the London and Port Stanley Railway, and the London, Huron and Bruce Railway passed through London. Due to his influence, the Grand Trunk Railway began to manufacture their cars in London.

In 1878, he established a water commission to provide a water supply to the city. Carling also established the Ontario Hospital for the Insane in London. In 1885, he provided the land on which Wolseley Barracks was established, now the Home Station of The Royal Canadian Regiment and the garrison of the regiment's 4th Battalion. He also facilitated the establishment of Victoria Park.

Carling was knighted in 1893 and served in the Senate until his death in 1911. He was buried in London's Mount Pleasant Cemetery.

== Legacy ==
In 1927, the Carling Brewery sponsored a trans-Atlantic flight from London (Canada) to London (UK). The plane was named the Sir John Carling, but both it and its pilots, Terence Tully and James Medcalf, disappeared over the Atlantic Ocean.

Today, there is an arena in London named for him. The town of Port Carling, Ontario, is named in his honour, as are the agricultural buildings in Ottawa. Carling Avenue in Ottawa is named for him as well, as are the neighbourhoods of Carlington and Carlingwood.

== Archives ==
There is a John Carling fonds at Library and Archives Canada.

== Electoral record ==
=== Provincial ===
1867 Ontario general election: London
Party	Candidate	Votes	%
Conservative	John Carling	948	61.00
Liberal	J. Durand	606	39.00
Total valid votes		1,554	56.00
Eligible voters		2,775	
Conservative pickup new district.			
Source: Elections Ontario

1871 Ontario general election: London
Party	Candidate	Votes	%	±%
Conservative	John Carling	985	63.84	+2.83
Liberal	Mr. Cornish	558	36.16	−2.83
Turnout		1,543	57.06	+1.06
Eligible voters		2,704		
Conservative hold		Swing		+2.83
Source: Elections Ontario

=== Federal ===
1867 Canadian federal election: London
Party	Candidate	Votes
Liberal–Conservative	John Carling	1,114
Unknown	James Peacock	266

1872 Canadian federal election: London
Party	Candidate	Votes
Liberal–Conservative	John Carling	1,101
Unknown	MacMahon	797
Source: Canadian Elections Database

1874 Canadian federal election: London
Party	Candidate	Votes
Liberal–Conservative	John Carling	1,101
Unknown	MacMahon	797
Source: Canadian Elections Database

1882 Canadian federal election: London
Party	Candidate	Votes
Liberal–Conservative	John Carling	1,485
Unknown	John Campbell	1,238

1887 Canadian federal election: London
Party	Candidate	Votes
Liberal–Conservative	John Carling	2,013
Liberal	Charles S. Hyman	1,974

1891 Canadian federal election: London
Party	Candidate	Votes
Liberal	C. S. Hyman	2,037
Liberal–Conservative	John Carling	1,854

By-election on 26 February 1892 Election annulled
Party	Candidate	Votes
Liberal–Conservative	John Carling
Liberal	C. S. Hyman
