= London (federal electoral district) =

Former federal electoral district in Ontario, Canada

Ontario electoral district

Defunct federal electoral district
- Legislature: House of Commons
- District created: 1867
- District abolished: 1966
- First contested: 1867
- Last contested: 1965

London was a federal electoral district represented in the House of Commons of Canada from 1867 to 1968. It was located in the province of Ontario.

It consisted initially of the City of London, Ontario.

In 1914, it was redefined to exclude parts of the former township of London, which was now a part of the city.

In 1924, it was redefined as consisting of that part of the city of London lying west of and south of a line following (from the north) Adelaide Street and Oxford Street, the east side of Wolsley Barracks area, Middleton Avenue, Glasgow Street, Lorne Avenue, Burbrook Place, Dundas Street, Swinyard Street, Pine Street, Elm Street, Trafalgar Street, Adelaide Street, the south branch of the River Thames, Beverly Street, and Wellington Street south to the south boundary of the city.

== Members of Parliament ==
This riding elected the following members of the House of Commons of Canada:

Parliament	Years	Member	Party
1st	1867–1872	John Carling	Liberal–Conservative
2nd	1872–1874	John Carling	Liberal–Conservative
3rd	1874–1874	John Walker	Liberal
3rd	1875–1878	James Harshaw Fraser	Liberal–Conservative
4th	1878–1882	John Carling	Liberal–Conservative
5th	1882–1887	John Carling	Liberal–Conservative
6th	1887–1891	John Carling	Liberal–Conservative
7th	1891–1892	C. S. Hyman	Liberal
7th	1892–1896	John Carling	Liberal–Conservative
8th	1896–1900	Thomas Beattie	Conservative
9th	1900–1904	C. S. Hyman	Liberal
10th	1904–1905	C. S. Hyman	Liberal
10th	1905–1907	C. S. Hyman	Liberal
10th	1907–1908	Thomas Beattie	Conservative
11th	1908–1911	Thomas Beattie	Conservative
12th	1911–1914†	Thomas Beattie	Conservative
12th	1915–1917	William Gray	Conservative
13th	1917–1921	Hume Cronyn	Government (Unionist)
14th	1921–1925	John Franklin White	Conservative
15th	1925–1926	John Franklin White	Conservative
16th	1926–1930	John Franklin White	Conservative
17th	1930–1935	John Franklin White	Conservative
18th	1935–1938†	Frederick Cronyn Betts	Conservative
18th	1938–1940	Robert James Manion	Conservative
19th	1940–1945	Allan Johnston	Liberal
20th	1945–1949	Park Manross	Progressive Conservative
21st	1949–1953	Alex Jeffery	Liberal
22nd	1953–1957	Robert Weld Mitchell	Progressive Conservative
23rd	1957–1958	Ernest Halpenny	Progressive Conservative
24th	1958–1962	Ernest Halpenny	Progressive Conservative
25th	1962–1963	Ernest Halpenny	Progressive Conservative
26th	1963–1965	Jack Irvine	Progressive Conservative
27th	1965–1968	Jack Irvine	Progressive Conservative
Riding dissolved into London West and London East

== Electoral history ==
1867 Canadian federal election
Party	Candidate	Votes
Liberal–Conservative	John Carling	1,114
Unknown	James Peacock	266

1872 Canadian federal election
Party	Candidate	Votes
Liberal–Conservative	John Carling	1,101
Unknown	MacMahon	797
Source: Canadian Elections Database

1874 Canadian federal election
Party	Candidate	Votes
Liberal–Conservative	John Carling	1,101
Unknown	MacMahon	797
Source: Canadian Elections Database

By-election on 18 February 1875 Walker unseated, 9 September 1874
Party	Candidate	Votes
Liberal–Conservative	James Harshaw Fraser	1,228
Unknown	Samuel Peters	1,100

1882 Canadian federal election
Party	Candidate	Votes
Liberal–Conservative	John Carling	1,485
Unknown	John Campbell	1,238

1887 Canadian federal election
Party	Candidate	Votes
Liberal–Conservative	John Carling	2,013
Liberal	Charles S. Hyman	1,974

1891 Canadian federal election
Party	Candidate	Votes
Liberal	C. S. Hyman	2,037
Liberal–Conservative	John Carling	1,854

By-election on 26 February 1892 Election annulled
Party	Candidate	Votes
Liberal–Conservative	John Carling
Liberal	C. S. Hyman

1896 Canadian federal election
Party	Candidate	Votes
Conservative	Thomas Beattie	2,325
Liberal	C. S. Hyman	2,284

1900 Canadian federal election
Party	Candidate	Votes
Liberal	C. S. Hyman	2,812
Conservative	Thomas Beattie	2,265
Independent	Robert Roadhouse	236

1904 Canadian federal election
Party	Candidate	Votes
Liberal	C. S. Hyman	4,302
Conservative	William Gray	4,278

By-election on 13 June 1905 Hyman appointed Minister of Public Works, 22 May 1905
Party	Candidate	Votes
Liberal	C. S. Hyman	4,581
Conservative	William Gray	4,251

By-election on 29 October 1907 Hyman resigned 11 April 1907
Party	Candidate	Votes
Conservative	Thomas Beattie	3,209
Liberal	J. D. Jacobs	2,174

1908 Canadian federal election
Party	Candidate	Votes
Conservative	Thomas Beattie	4,121
Unknown	John Wiley McCandless	2,987

1911 Canadian federal election
Party	Candidate	Votes
Conservative	Thomas Beattie	5,263
Unknown	John Millar McEvoy	3,352

By-election on 1 February 1915 Beattie died 2 December 1914
Party	Candidate	Votes
Conservative	William Gray	acclaimed

1917 Canadian federal election
Party	Candidate	Votes
Government (Unionist)	Hume Cronyn	11,136
Opposition (Laurier Liberals)	George Sutton Gibbons	6,783

1921 Canadian federal election
Party	Candidate	Votes
Conservative	John Franklin White	9,730
Liberal	Charles Somerville	7,974
Progressive	Arthur Mould	4,252

1925 Canadian federal election
Party	Candidate	Votes
Conservative	John Franklin White	12,260
Liberal	Edgar Sydney Little	7,777
Labour	John Colert	2,405

1926 Canadian federal election
Party	Candidate	Votes
Conservative	John Franklin White	12,249
Liberal	William John Stevenson	11,404

1930 Canadian federal election
Party	Candidate	Votes
Conservative	John Franklin White	13,981
Liberal	Jared Vining	9,698

1935 Canadian federal election
Party	Candidate	Votes
Conservative	Frederick Cronyn Betts	10,911
Liberal	George Arthur Porte Brickenden	8,628
Reconstruction	John Franklin White	3,814
Co-operative Commonwealth	Everett Orlan Hall	3,041
Independent	George Wenige	2,101
Independent Liberal	Clifford Hamilton Reason	1,203
Independent	Hugh Allan Stevenson	406

By-election on 14 November 1938 Betts died 7 May 1938
Party	Candidate	Votes
Conservative	Robert James Manion	11,364
Co-operative Commonwealth	Everett Orlan Hall	8,166

1940 Canadian federal election
Party	Candidate	Votes
Liberal	Allan Johnston	15,824
National Government	Thomas Kingsmill	12,534
Co-operative Commonwealth	Everett Orlan Hall	3,762

1945 Canadian federal election
Party	Candidate	Votes
Progressive Conservative	Park Manross	16,766
Liberal	Allan Johnston	13,421
Co-operative Commonwealth	Everett Orlan Hall	4,901
Labor–Progressive	Arthur Mould	225

1949 Canadian federal election
Party	Candidate	Votes
Liberal	Alex Jeffery	16,427
Progressive Conservative	Park Manross	14,988
Co-operative Commonwealth	Everett O. Hall	4,532

1953 Canadian federal election
Party	Candidate	Votes
Progressive Conservative	Robert Weld Mitchell	15,254
Liberal	S. Floyd Maine	12,869
Co-operative Commonwealth	Gwen Pemberton	2,748
Labor–Progressive	Allison Grant Campbell	662

1957 Canadian federal election
Party	Candidate	Votes
Progressive Conservative	Ernest Halpenny	19,804
Liberal	Hugh Mackenzie	11,110
Co-operative Commonwealth	Gwen Pemberton	2,714

1958 Canadian federal election
Party	Candidate	Votes
Progressive Conservative	Ernest Halpenny	24,276
Liberal	Hugh Alexander Mackenzie	9,107
Co-operative Commonwealth	E.O. Hall	2,598

1962 Canadian federal election
Party	Candidate	Votes
Progressive Conservative	Ernest Halpenny	16,096
Liberal	Harry Quigley	11,084
New Democratic	John Gelleta	3,679
Social Credit	Larry Wilcocks	447

1963 Canadian federal election
Party	Candidate	Votes
Progressive Conservative	Jack Irvine	15,700
Liberal	Clarence M. Peterson	14,262
New Democratic	Paddy O'Brien	3,335
Social Credit	Lloyd H. Alford	599

1965 Canadian federal election
Party	Candidate	Votes
Progressive Conservative	Jack Irvine	13,763
Liberal	Margaret Fullerton	11,164
New Democratic	Clayton Fee	4,412
Independent	Albert W. Plumb	422
Communist	Thomas Morris	271

== See also ==
- List of Canadian electoral districts
- Historical federal electoral districts of Canada
