= John Labatt =

Canadian businessman (1838–1915)

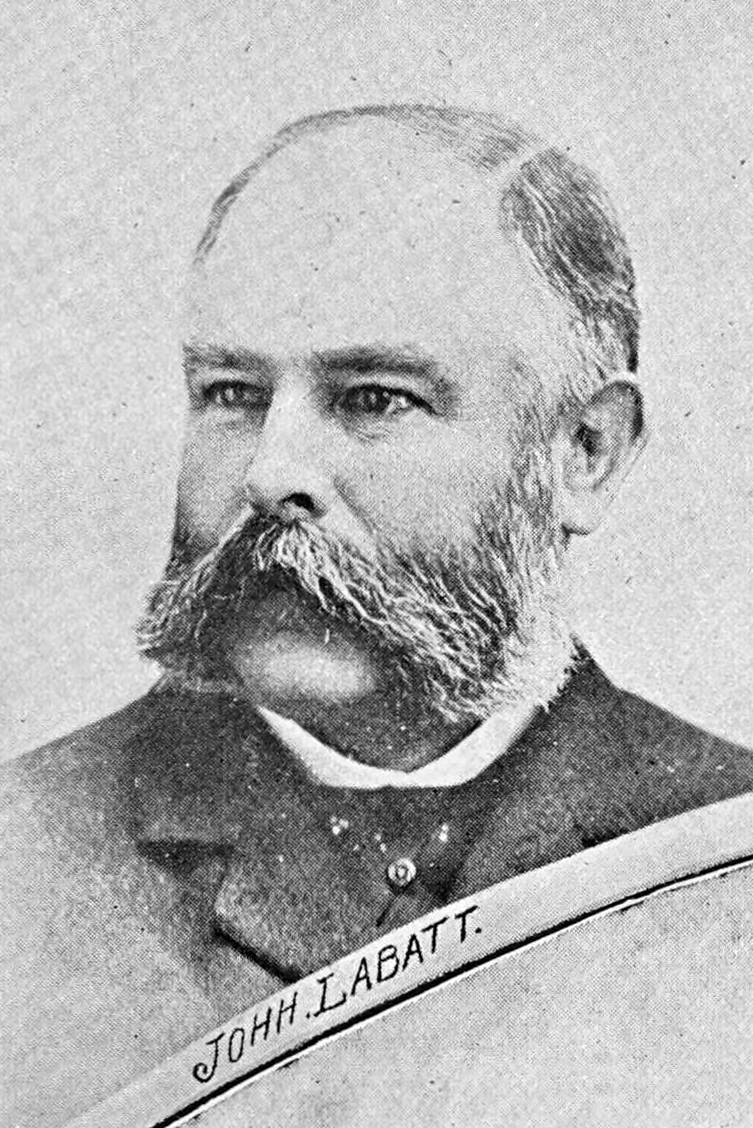
- Labatt, c. 1897
- Born: 11 December 1838; Westminster Township, Upper Canada
- Died: 27 April 1915 (aged 76); London, Ontario
- Occupation: Businessman
- Spouse: Catherine Maria Biddulph
- Children: 9, including John Sackville Labatt
- Father: John Kinder Labatt (father)
- Family: Hume Cronyn (grandson); Graham Jarvis (great-grandson)

John Labatt (11 December 1838 – 27 April 1915) was a Canadian businessman and brewer. Labatt took charge of Labatt Brewing Company, formally known as Labatt and Company, after his father's death in 1866. Labatt helped Labatt Brewing Company eventually become the largest brewery in Canada.

== Early life ==
Labatt was born in 1838 in Westminster Township, near London, Upper Canada, and was the son of Eliza (Kell), from Bradford, England, and John Kinder Labatt, an Irish immigrant and founder of the Labatt Brewing Company. He attended Trinity College School in Port Hope, Ontario, graduating in 1896. Labatt also attended Caradoc Academy, as well as secondary school in London, Upper Canada. Labatt went on to apprentice to American brewer George Weatherall Smith in Wheeling, West Virginia, from 1859 to 1864, where he learned the skills to work for his father's company.

Labatt grew up around beer, brewers, and beer drinking, helping him learn and understand other necessary skills that enabled him to begin working for his father's company at the age of 19. After working as an apprentice brewer in the United States, he was appointed brewmaster for Labatt Brewing Company when he returned in 1864. In 1866, after the death of his father the company was left to Labatt's mother, who made a deal with her son in which he received the company under a mortgage. This allowed for his mother to maintain a steady income, with Labatt being the overall head of the company. Labatt later set out to expand the company, and began by renaming it Labatt and Company.

== Professional career ==
As the new manager and brewmaster of Labatt and Company, Labatt made many strategic decisions that eventually led the company to be one of the largest breweries in Canada. Aware of other competition in his area, Labatt sought to grow his company as fast as he could. Labatt introduced an English-style India pale ale (IPA) in the 1870s to the Canadian market, which served as an immediate success, as it was loved by thousands across Eastern Canada. To produce this product, Labatt utilized the hard water of his well, high-quality barley from southwestern Ontario, and hops purchased from British Columbia and Central Europe. All of the equipment that he used was manufactured locally near London, Canada, allowing Labatt to sustain production in London.

As industrialization rolled through Canada in the late 19th century, Labatt took advantage of the railways that were being laid. Using the railways, he was able to expand his company rapidly, and by 1900, owned and operated bottling agencies in Hamilton, Toronto, Ottawa, Montreal, Quebec City, and Saint John. Through the many expansions, he was able to double the capacity of his London plant compared to the 1870s, with his malting and brewing business growing to be the seventh largest in Canada at the time. In terms of marketing for his company, Labatt depended on print advertising such as newspapers, magazines, and calendars. Displays of Labatt's company, logo, and beer were mounted at events across the United States, drawing thousands of visitors at fairs and contests, like the Philadelphia Centennial International Exhibition in 1876 and the Columbian exposition in Chicago in 1893. At the Philadelphia Centennial International Exhibition, his India pale ale was awarded a ‘gold medal,’ besting other brewers from across the world.

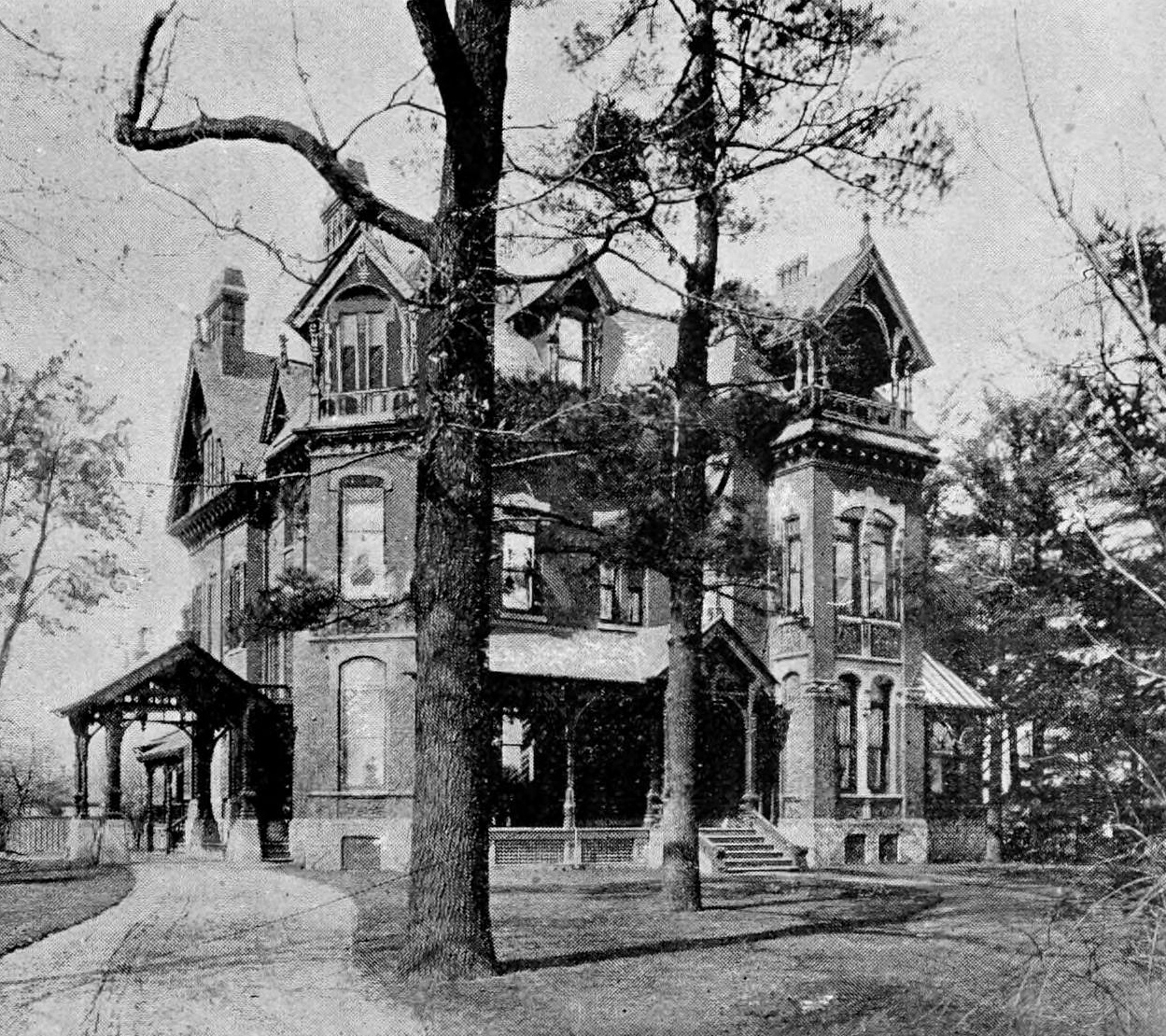
The John Labatt House, designed by George F. Durand (built 1882–1884, since demolished)

Even while Labatt sought to grow his company, he faced much adversity from temperance forces. The ‘drys’ of Canada mobilized, all in favor of banning alcohol and alcoholic sales, and rallied to pass the Scott Act (also known as Canada Temperance Act), prohibiting the sale of all ‘intoxicating beverages’ in certain municipalities across Canada, creating challenges for brewers like Labatt. After the passage of this act, the Dominion Brewers and Maltsters' Association (DBMA), to which Labatt was a large financial contributor, was created, to help counter what the Scott Act stood for. With Labatt's financial help, the DBMA lobbied the Canadian government to try to put an end to the Scott Act. Contrary to its intention, the passage of this act actually benefited brewers and their companies, especially Labatt, because he was forced, due to the proximity of dry areas, to expand to places where the Scott Act had not reached. Labatt expanded to the far east and west of Canada, and took advantage of large markets like Vancouver, in British Columbia. The Scott Act also changed the way that Labatt sold his beer, increasing his sales as the company turned more towards the bottled beer approach, which gained popularity from 1878 to 1889. By selling his beer in bottles, his profits almost doubled, from $29,415.36 in 1878 to $55,117.15 in 1889. In 1911, his company continued to grow despite continued governmental restrictions on the sale of alcoholic beverages, selling almost $500,000 worth of beer. At that point, Labatt's company had grown to the largest brewery in Canada. In the same year, Labatt became the last Ontario brewer to incorporate his company, to ensure the continuity of ownership, and get rid of private ownership, as made popular by famous Harvard business historian Alfred Chandler.

== Personal life and legacy ==
Labatt's wife was Catherine Maria Biddulph. They together had nine children, most notable being John Sackville Labatt and Hugh Francis Labatt. His grandson was actor Hume Cronyn and his great-grandson was actor Graham Jarvis. In 1915, at the age of 77, John Labatt died, the company being controlled by a trust operated by all his children, although his sons John and Hugh assumed managerial control.
