= Frederick Cronyn Betts =

Canadian politician (1896–1938)

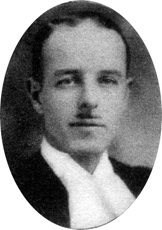

Member of the Canadian Parliament for London
- In office October 14, 1935 – May 7, 1938
- Preceded by: John Franklin White
- Succeeded by: Robert James Manion

Personal details
- Born: July 4, 1896 London, Ontario, Canada
- Died: May 7, 1938 (aged 41)
- Party: Conservative Party
- Occupation: Solicitor

Military service
- Allegiance: Canada
- Branch/service: Canadian Army
- Years of service: 1916-1919
- Rank: Lieutenant
- Battles/wars: World War I

Frederick Cronyn Betts (July 4, 1896 – May 7, 1938) was a Canadian politician and solicitor. He was elected to the House of Commons of Canada in 1935 as a Member of the Conservative Party to represent the riding of London. He died in office on May 7, 1938. Prior to his federal political experience, he was a councillor on the London City Council between 1928 and 1929. During World War I, he served overseas with the 12th Battery, Canadian Field Artillery in France.

1935 Canadian federal election: London
Party	Candidate	Votes
Conservative	Frederick Cronyn Betts	10,911
Liberal	George Arthur Porte Brickenden	8,628
Reconstruction	John Franklin White	3,814
Co-operative Commonwealth	Everett Orlan Hall	3,041
Independent	George Albert Wenige	2,101
Independent Liberal	Clifford Hamilton Reason	1,203
Independent	Hugh Allan Stevenson	406
