= John Kinder Labatt =

Canadian businessman (1803–1866)

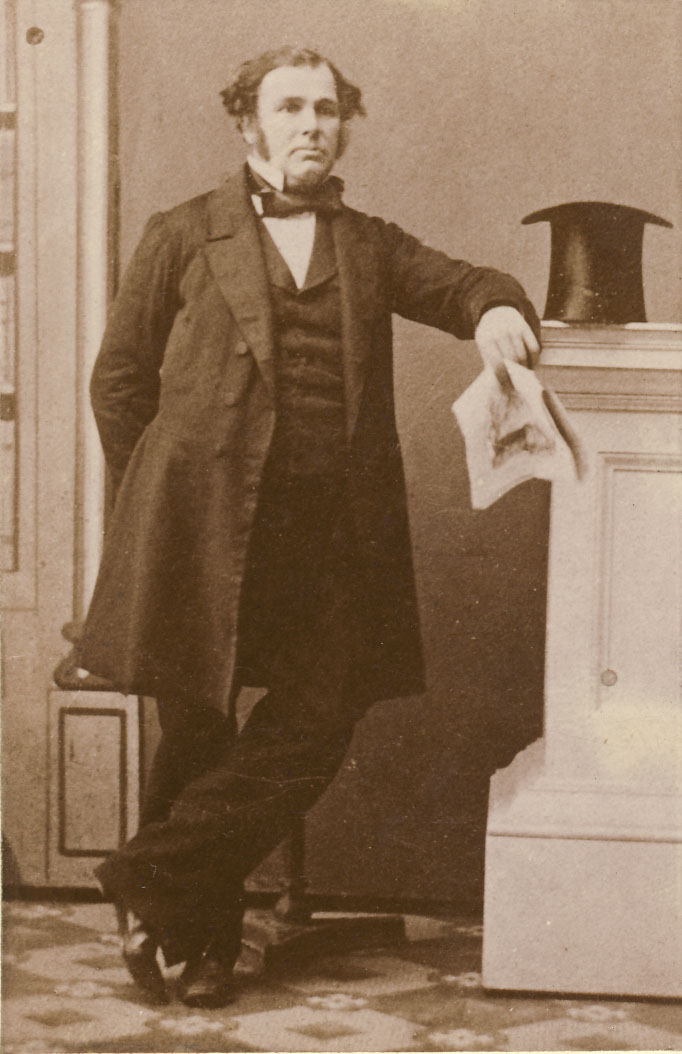
- Labatt c. 1864
- Born: 1803; Killermogh, County Laois, Ireland
- Died: October 26, 1866 (aged 62–63); Middlesex County, Ontario, Canada
- Known for: founder of Labatt Brewing Company
- Relatives: Hume Cronyn (maternal great-grandson); Hume Cronyn Sr. (maternal grandson)

John Kinder Labatt (1803 – 26 October 1866) was an Irish-Canadian brewer and the founder of the Labatt Brewing Company.

== Life and career ==
He was born in Queen's County (now County Laois), Ireland, to Valentine Knightley Chetwode Labat (1761–1813), an Irish-Huguenot, and Jane Harper Labat. Little is known of his early years.

Labatt immigrated to Canada in the 1830s and initially established himself as a farmer near London, Upper Canada. During the Rebellions of 1837–1838, he served as a private in the 3rd Middlesex Militia, stationed on guard at St. Thomas in December of 1837.

In 1847, he invested in a brewery with a partner, Samuel Eccles, launching "Labatt and Eccles". When Eccles retired in 1854, Labatt acquired his interest and renamed the firm the "London Brewery". He was assisted by his sons Ephraim, Robert and John.

In 1849, Labatt started a new venture along with several other London businessmen including Thomas Carline called the Proof Line Road Joint Stock Company. The company built a road that linked London and the northern hinterlands. Upon completion, the road had three tollgates.

Beyond the brewery, Labatt was a town councillor for Saint David's Ward from 1850 to 1851 and a founding member of the London Board of Trade (which is now The London Chamber of Commerce), as well as the founder of the London and Port Stanley Railway.

Upon his death, his son John Labatt purchased the brewery, which grew to become one of the largest in Canada.

== See also ==
- John Labatt Centre
- John Molson
