= Robert Weld Mitchell =

Canadian politician

Member of Parliament for London
- In office August 1953 – April 1957

Personal details
- Born: 10 August 1915 Toronto, Ontario, Canada
- Died: 13 December 1994 (aged 79)
- Resting place: Woodland Cemetery, London, Ontario
- Party: Progressive Conservative
- Spouse(s): Betty Elaine Heaslip (m. 17 August 1940)
- Profession: Lawyer

Robert Weld Mitchell MBE (10 August 1915 – 13 December 1994) was a Progressive Conservative party member of the House of Commons of Canada and a lawyer.

He was born in Toronto, the son of Percy Dawson Mitchell and Olive Weld, and was educated at Ridley College and Osgoode Hall. Mitchell was called to the Ontario bar in 1958. He was a director of William Weld Co. Ltd., served as president of the London Boy Scouts Association, was president of the London Chamber of Commerce from 1962 to 1963 and served as vice-president of Supertest Petroleum, later part of BP Canada.

Between 1940 and 1945, Mitchell served in the Canadian Army with The Perth Regiment.

He was first elected at the London riding in the 1953 general election. After serving only one federal term, the 22nd Canadian Parliament, Mitchell left federal politics and did not seek re-election. He died in 1994.

1953 Canadian federal election: London
Party	Candidate	Votes
Progressive Conservative	Robert Weld Mitchell	15,254
Liberal	S. Floyd Maine	12,869
Co-operative Commonwealth	Gwen Pemberton	2,748
Labor–Progressive	Allison Grant Campbell	662
