= John Franklin White =

Canadian politician

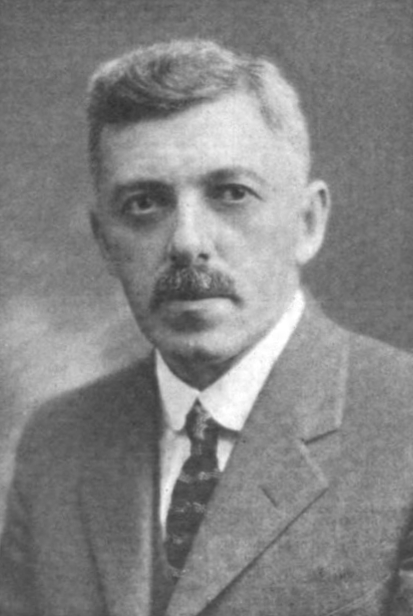

Member of Parliament for London
- In office 6 December 1921 – 13 October 1935
- Preceded by: Hume Cronyn
- Succeeded by: Frederick Cronyn Betts

Personal details
- Born: John Franklin White; 27 October 1873 London, Ontario, Canada
- Died: 22 June 1961 (aged 87)
- Party: Conservative
- Spouse(s): Alice Maud Rigsby m. 28 October 1897
- Profession: Industrialist

John Franklin White (27 October 1873 – 22 June 1961) was a Conservative member of the House of Commons of Canada. He was born in London, Ontario and became an industrialist.

White was a manufacturer of iron and steel, managing the London Rolling Mill company at one time. He served as a city alderman for London City Council in 1913 and 1914, and for 1915 and 1916 was the city's controller.

He was first elected to Parliament at the London riding in the 1921 general election then re-elected in 1921, 1925, 1926 and 1930. In the 1935 election, White switched to the Reconstruction Party and was defeated at London by Frederick Cronyn Betts who became the Conservative party candidate in that vote.

1921 Canadian federal election: London
Party	Candidate	Votes
Conservative	John Franklin White	9,730
Liberal	Charles Somerville	7,974
Progressive	Arthur Mould	4,252

1925 Canadian federal election: London
Party	Candidate	Votes
Conservative	John Franklin White	12,260
Liberal	Edgar Sydney Little	7,777
Labour	John Colert	2,405

1926 Canadian federal election: London
Party	Candidate	Votes
Conservative	John Franklin White	12,249
Liberal	William John Stevenson	11,404

1930 Canadian federal election: London
Party	Candidate	Votes
Conservative	John Franklin White	13,981
Liberal	Jared Vining	9,698
