= William Gray (Canadian politician) =

Canadian politician

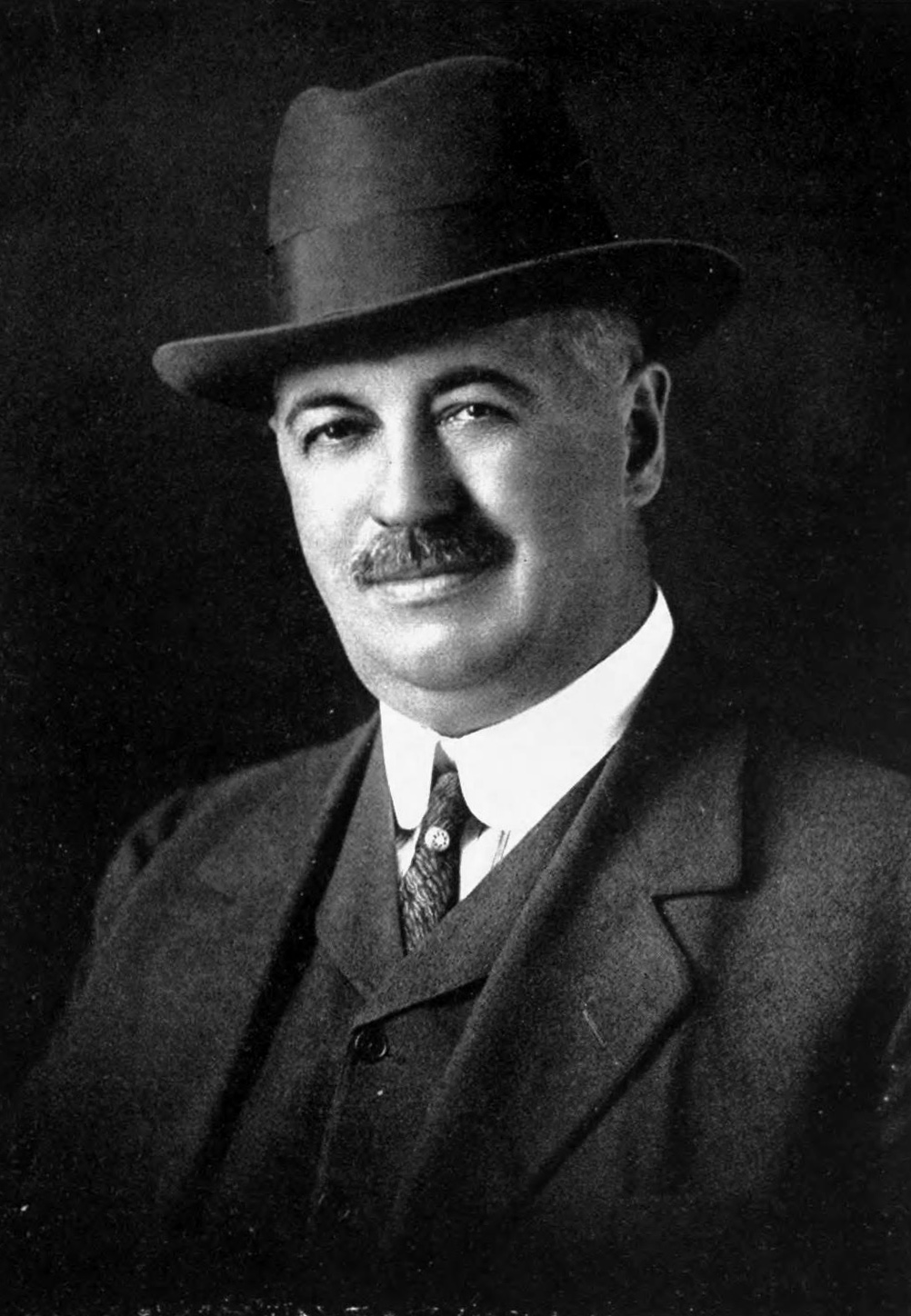
Gray in an undated photograph

William Gray (August 31, 1862 – December 12, 1916) was a manufacturer and political figure in Ontario, Canada. He represented London in the House of Commons of Canada from 1915 to 1916 as a Conservative.

He was born in Newcastle, Canada West, the son of William Gray, and was educated in Guelph and Galt. In 1889, he married Clara A. Whetten. Gray lived in London, Ontario. He was president of the Ottawa and St. Lawrence Railway, Kings Quicksilver Mining Company of California, the Dominion Oil Company of California, the Maple Leaf Oil Company of California and the Merchants Manufacturing and Importing Company. Gray was an unsuccessful candidate for a seat in the House of Commons in 1904 and 1908. He died in office in London, Ontario at the age of 54.
