= William Robinson (Canadian architect) =

Irish-born Canadian architect (1812–1894)

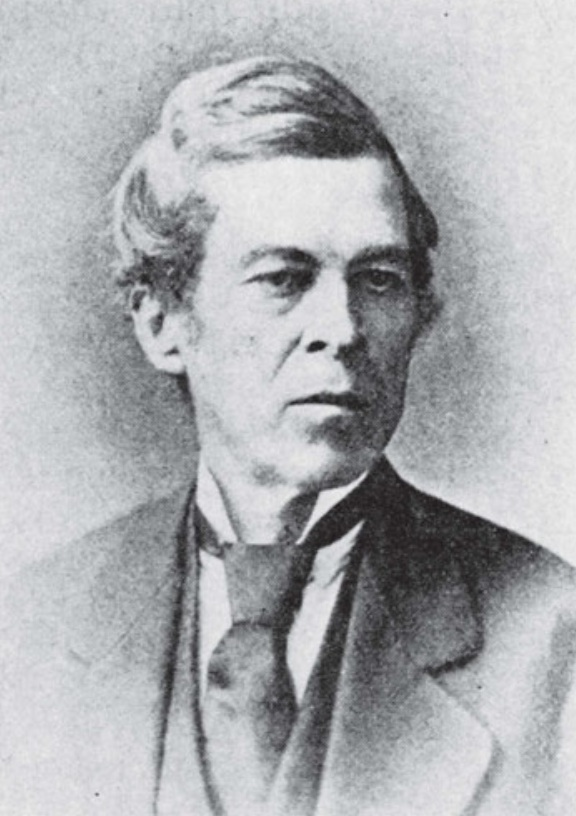
- Born: March 27, 1812; New Ross, County Wexford, Ireland
- Died: October 10, 1894 (aged 82); London, Ontario, Canada
- Occupations: Architect; land surveyor
- Years active: 1860s–1889

William Robinson (March 27, 1812 – October 10, 1894) was an Irish-born Canadian architect and land surveyor. Born in New Ross, County Wexford, Robinson emigrated to Upper Canada with his family in 1836. While the family settled in Burford, Robinson spent several years travelling the region working as a labourer before informally apprenticing to Thomas Young in Toronto. He remained in the city for more than a decade, under a series of employers that included Henry Bowyer Lane, and was certified as a land surveyor in 1846.

Robinson left Toronto around 1852, after experiencing a debilitating illness, and after some time recovering at the family home he moved to London, Ontario, where he remained for the rest of his life. Initially partnering with William Beaumont Leather, in 1857 Robinson established his own architectural firm and was made the city engineer. He remained in practice through 1878, with apprentices such as Thomas Henry Tracy, George F. Durand, and John Mackenzie Moore later becoming partners. Among the buildings he designed in London are Christ Church and the Waterloo South Primary Public School, both of which have been designated under the Ontario Heritage Act.

== Biography ==
=== Early life ===
An 1840–1841 map of London by Robinson

Robinson was born in New Ross, a town in County Wexford, Ireland, on March 27, 1812, to James Robinson and his wife Elizabeth (née Davis). The family had an interest in construction, and James Robinson had supervised the construction of buildings in Rosegarland. The family immigrated to Burford, Upper Canada (now Ontario) in November 1836, following William's brother John, who had left for Canada in 1833. In 1837, William Robinson travelled to Hamilton to find work as a carpenter, then spent eighteen months as a builder in Brantford.

In early 1839, upon the recommendation of his employer in Brantford, Robinson first arrived in London, Ontario, as a labourer working on the local garrison's barracks. He joined, and may have helped revive, the London Mechanics' Institute. Robinson also produced one of the earliest maps of the area. Drawing on an earlier survey for its representation of streets, the map also included various illustrations, including fowl, columns, and what appears to be a personification of Death pointing at a tomb labelled "London, Canada West", as Britannia mourns.

=== Architecture and land surveying ===
Robinson was in Toronto by 1841, when a previous employer recommended him to Thomas Young. Young was an established architect, having previously taught at Upper Canada College and designed King's College (now the University of Toronto) in 1837; the construction of the college was still underway when Robinson began working with Young. Although Young provided little instruction and the two had no formal articles of indenture, his expansive library allowed Robinson to study subjects such as trigonometry and linear perspective.

After leaving Young, Robinson began working for John Ritchey as a builder, spending two years in his employ. At the time, Ritchey was a prominent builder, having been contracted for additions to Osgoode Hall and the Bank of Montreal Building (now the Hockey Hall of Fame), among other tenders. Robinson obtained certification as a land surveyor in May 1846 after passing an examination in Montreal, where he remained several months. Under this title, he taught geometrical drawing to local workmen.

In early 1847, Robinson began employment as a clerk of works under Henry Bowyer Lane, having been recommended by John G. Howard. He remained with the firm even after Lane's return to England in November of that year, working on Lawton Park, a mansion commissioned by Colonel Arthur Carthew. In 1849, he began working for Charles Rankin, and completed a survey of the Toronto and Owen Sound Road. After Rankin moved to Owen Sound in 1851, Robinson continued the business in his own name. By 1852, Robinson was a member of the Canadian Institute, which had received its royal charter the previous year.

Robinson was struck by illness c. 1852, leaving him unable to complete a survey for the Township of Howick, and returned to Burford to live with his father. Upon recuperating, in the mid-1850s, Robinson—by then in his forties—returned to London, where he began calling himself an architect, and working with the engineer William Beaumont Leather. The two remained in partnership through 1856, though they also listed independent advertisements in the London City Directory of 1856–1857. Robinson was made the city engineer of London in May 1857, a part-time position that he held until 1878.

=== Robinson and Company ===
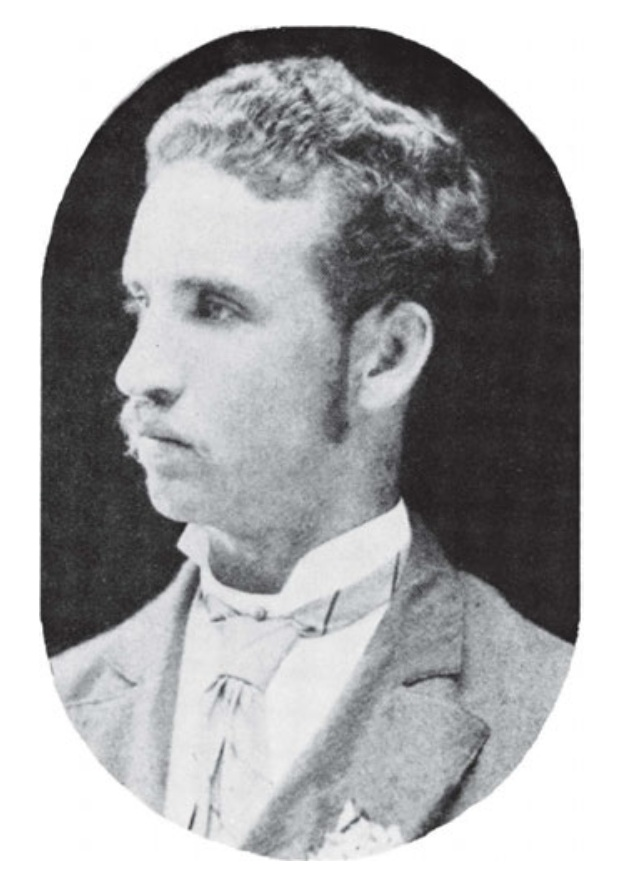
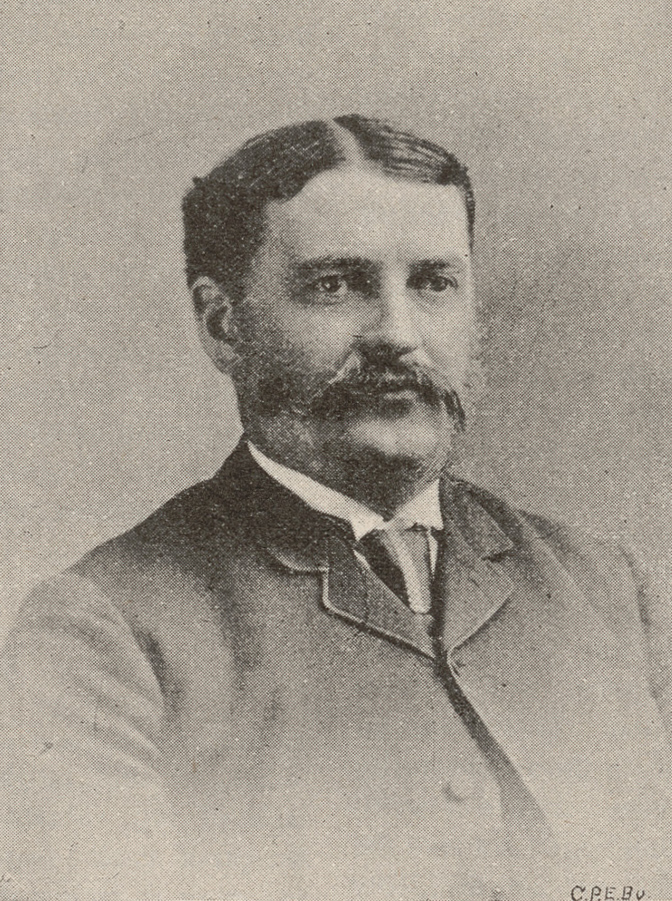
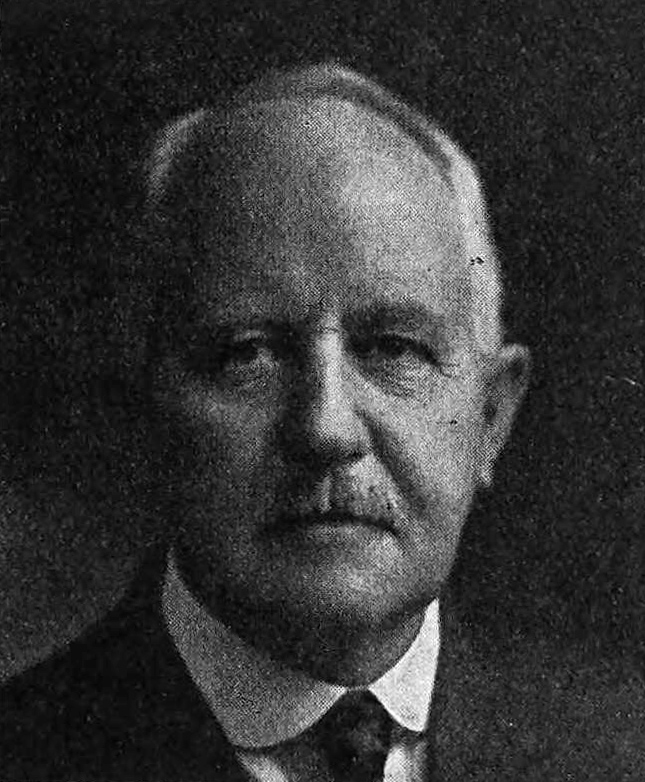
Robinson's apprentices included future partners Thomas Henry Tracy (left), George F. Durand (centre), and John Mackenzie Moore (right)

Also in 1857, Robinson established his own architectural firm, and began taking apprentices whom he trained in architecture. Persons who studied under Robinson included Thomas Dyas, Richard Fairbairne, and Richard Wright, who later found work in Toronto and Ottawa. He also taught Thomas Tracy, George F. Durand, and John Mackenzie Moore, all of whom continued working with Robinson and eventually became partners in the firm. Robinson also later taught drawing at the London Collegiate Institute.

As Robinson established his architectural firm, London was experiencing an economic depression, with construction minimal. Incomplete records from the era indicate only two commissions, a grist mill in Delaware and a schoolhouse in London. More commissions became available from 1860 onward. In 1861, Robinson designed the Crystal Palace for the Provincial Exhibition in London. Rather than model it after its namesake in London, England, he used a Neoclassical design of wood and brick. Classical elements are also evident in shops built between 1864 and 1865; known collectively as the Crystal Block, these are some of Robinson's few surviving commercial structures. Meanwhile, between 1864 and 1872, Robinson built a series of churches with markedly Gothic Revival influences, though some (such as the Bishop's Palace, 1870–1872) also prominently feature Tudor styling. Tudor styling was also evident in the Collegiate Institute, built from 1864 to 1865, a since-demolished structure which provided space for the boarding and education of more than 150 students.

Beginning in the 1860s, Robinson built a series of houses in the Italianate style. Between 1870 and 1873, Robinson built the Custom House, and in 1874 he completed new buildings for Labatt's Brewery after the previous ones were destroyed by fire. In his capacity as city engineer, he erected numerous schools and market stalls, as well as a police station and pump house. Between 1873 and 1875, he completed the City Hospital in London, which has since been replaced by the Victoria Hospital, and between 1875 and 1876 he completed a commission from the federal government for several militia buildings. Robinson used his position as city engineer to secure his company the tender for renovating the Middlesex County Courthouse (1877–1878). He also built London's water works, which were completed in 1878.

In 1873, Robinson made Thomas Henry Tracy partner in his firm. Based on design elements, Nancy Z. Tausky and Lynne D. Distefano write in their survey of Victorian architecture in Southwestern Ontario that the men appear to have worked mostly independently. Richard Fairbairne was partner briefly in 1877–1878, after which time he left to work for Kivas Tully. In 1878, George Durand became junior partner. The firm had a positive reputation in the area, and Robinson and his partners received commissions in towns such as Barrie, Dresden, and Stratford.

=== Later life and death ===
Robinson retired in 1878. He travelled to Europe, then spent five months in the State of New York in the United States. Robinson remained unmarried, instead spending much of his later life living with his brother Frank. Robinson died on October 10, 1894, and was buried in Norwich Township after a service at Christ Church, London. Eulogies described him as a "treasure" who had been wedded to his work.

At the time of his death, Robinson's estate was worth more than CA$15,000 (equivalent to $600,000 in 2025). Part of this was divided amongst his surviving family, with the largest share given to the children of his brother Frank. Other bequeathments included a new gymnasium for the Union School, contributions to temperance unions and retirement homes, as well as CA$1,000 (equivalent to $40,000 in 2025) to Bishop Maurice Scollard Baldwin for use in "extreme poverty cases".

== Legacy ==
The firm established by Robinson survived through the 1960s, at which time it was headed by Ronald E. Murphy. Murphy donated the firm's early records, including hundreds of architectural drawings and business records as well as books and journals, to the University of Western Ontario. The only book bearing Robinson's signature is an 1850 edition of Tubular and other Iron Girder Bridges. Robinson is described by Tausky and Distefano as "arguably ... the most influential architect" in London's history, and by Alice Gibb of the Architectural Conservancy of Ontario as "London's first important architect".

Several of Robinson's designs have been registered under the Ontario Heritage Act. The Christ Church in London, constructed between 1862 and 1863 using locally sourced white bricks, was designated in 2007. Built with funds raised by rector Reverend George M. Innes, it is described by the City of London as "turning financially-enforced simplicity into elegant orderliness". The Waterloo South Primary Public School, built in 1864 in accordance with Robinson's design, was designated in 1991 and is recognized as the city's oldest surviving educational building. It now serves as the Cornerstone United Reformed Church.

== Selected works ==
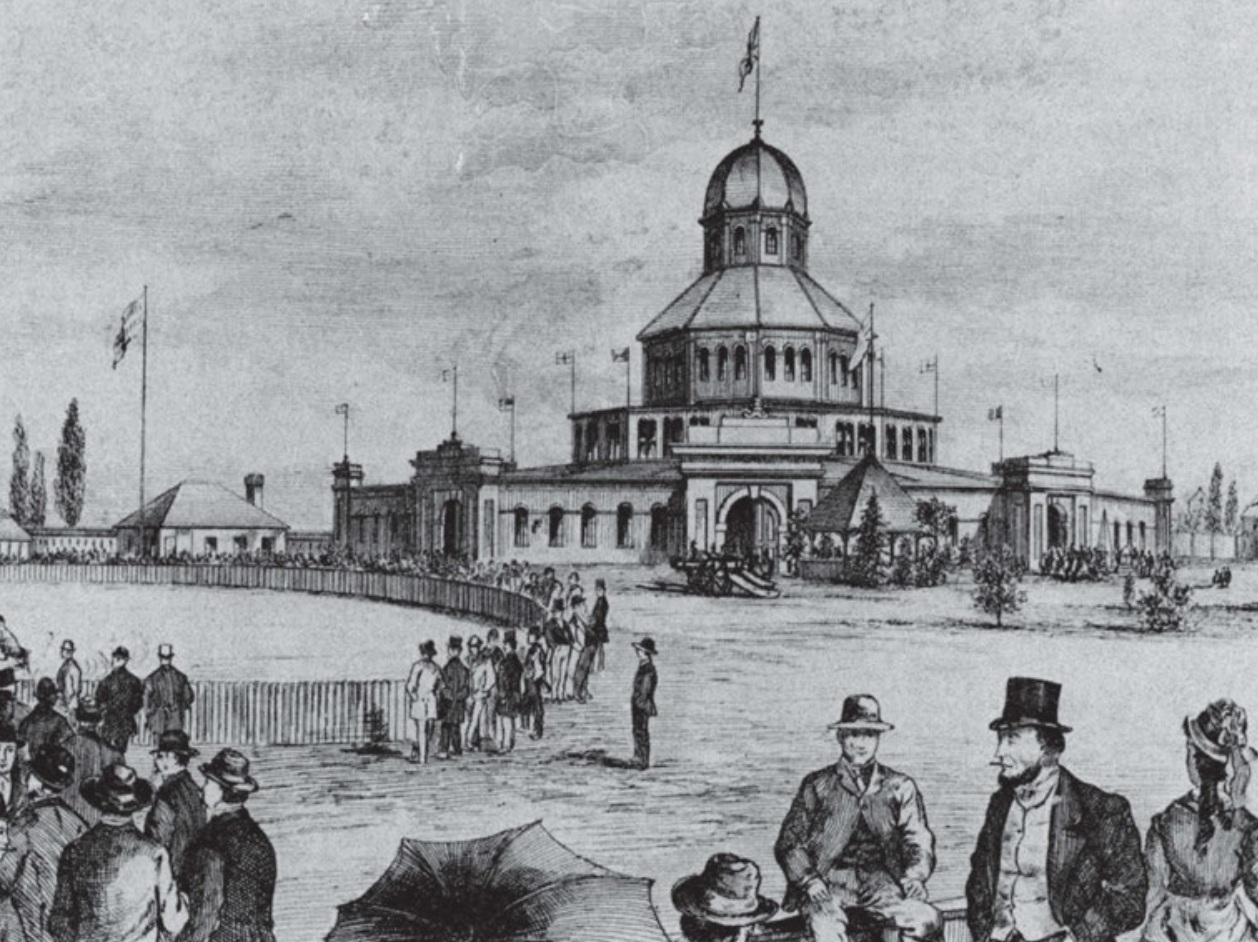
Provincial Exhibition Building (1861, now demolished)

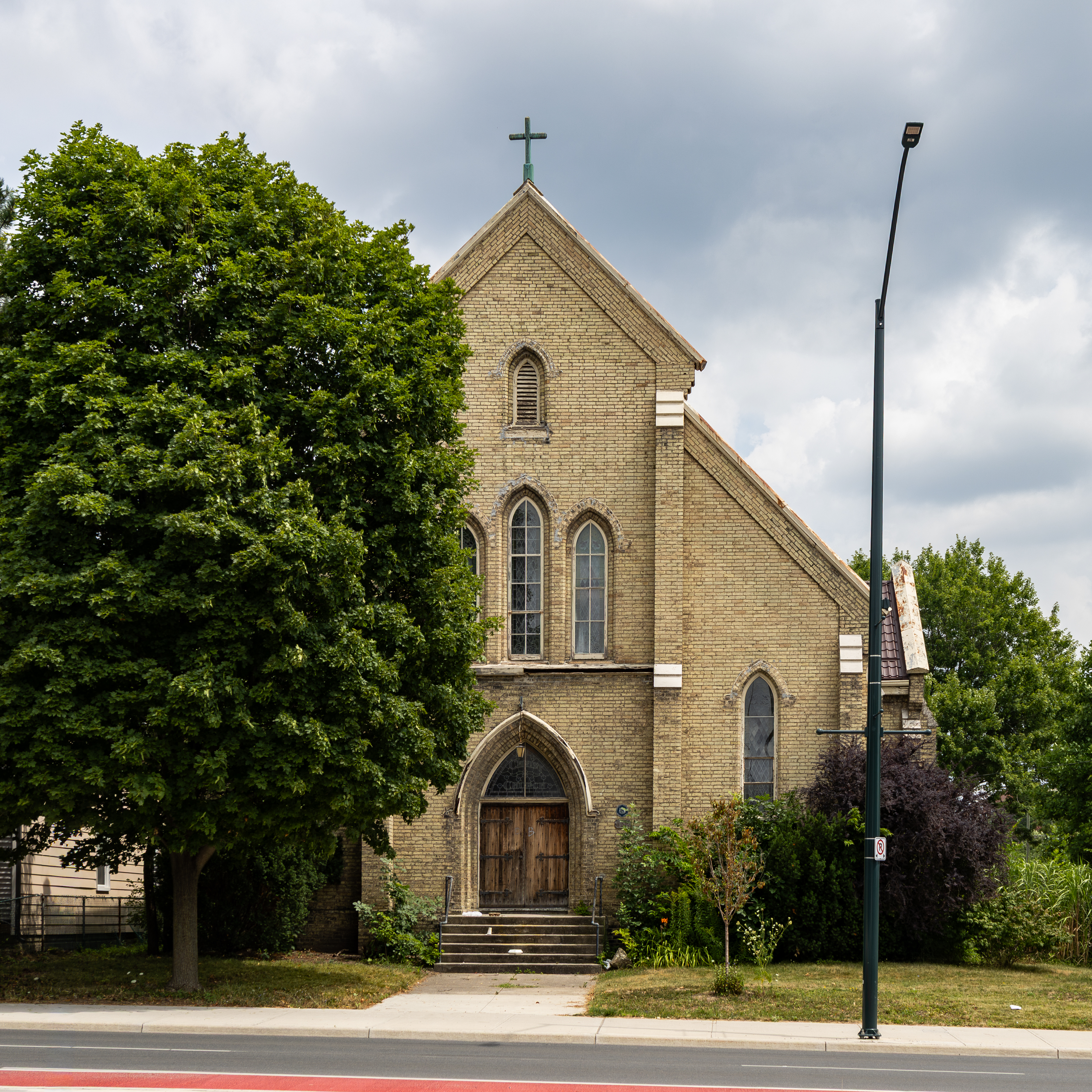
Christ Church, London (1862–1863)

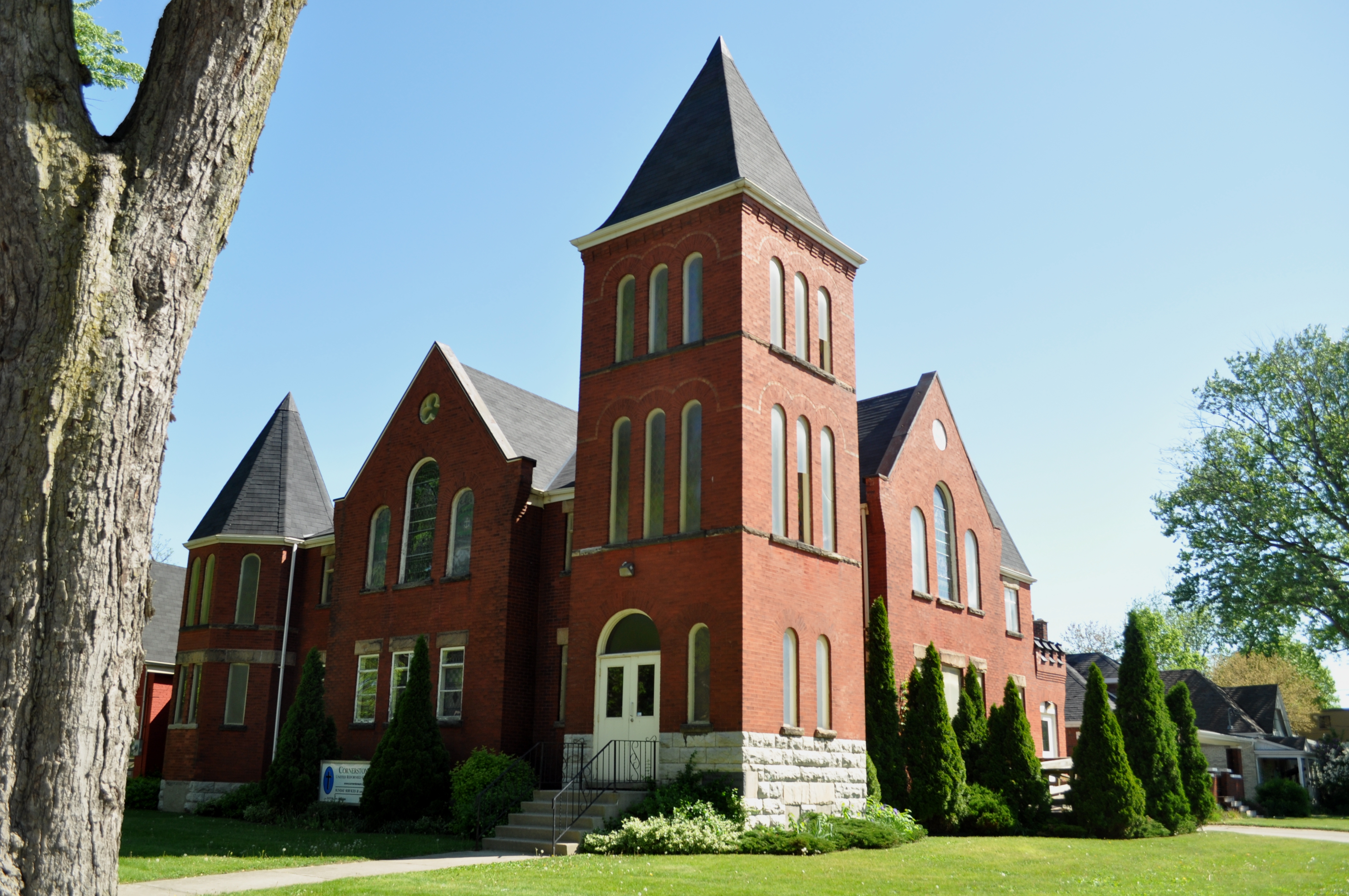
Old Waterloo South Primary Public School (1864)

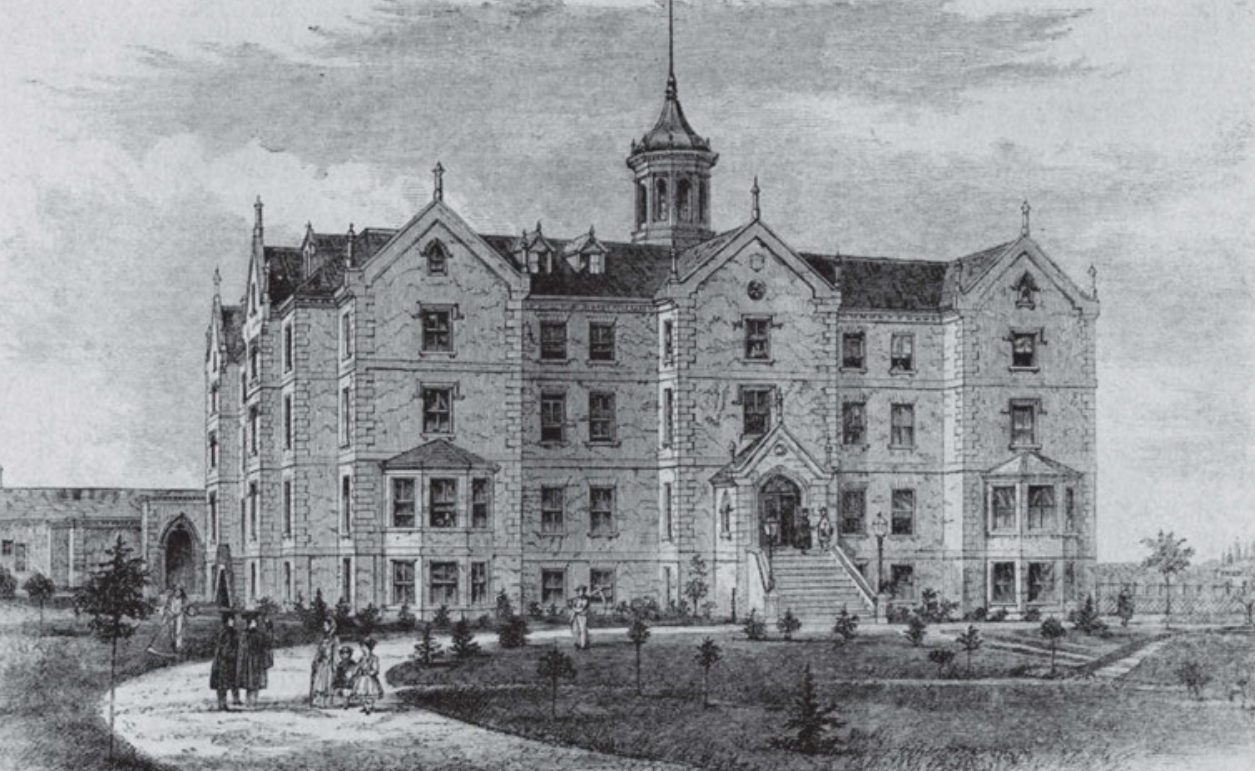
Collegiate Institute (1864–1865, now demolished)

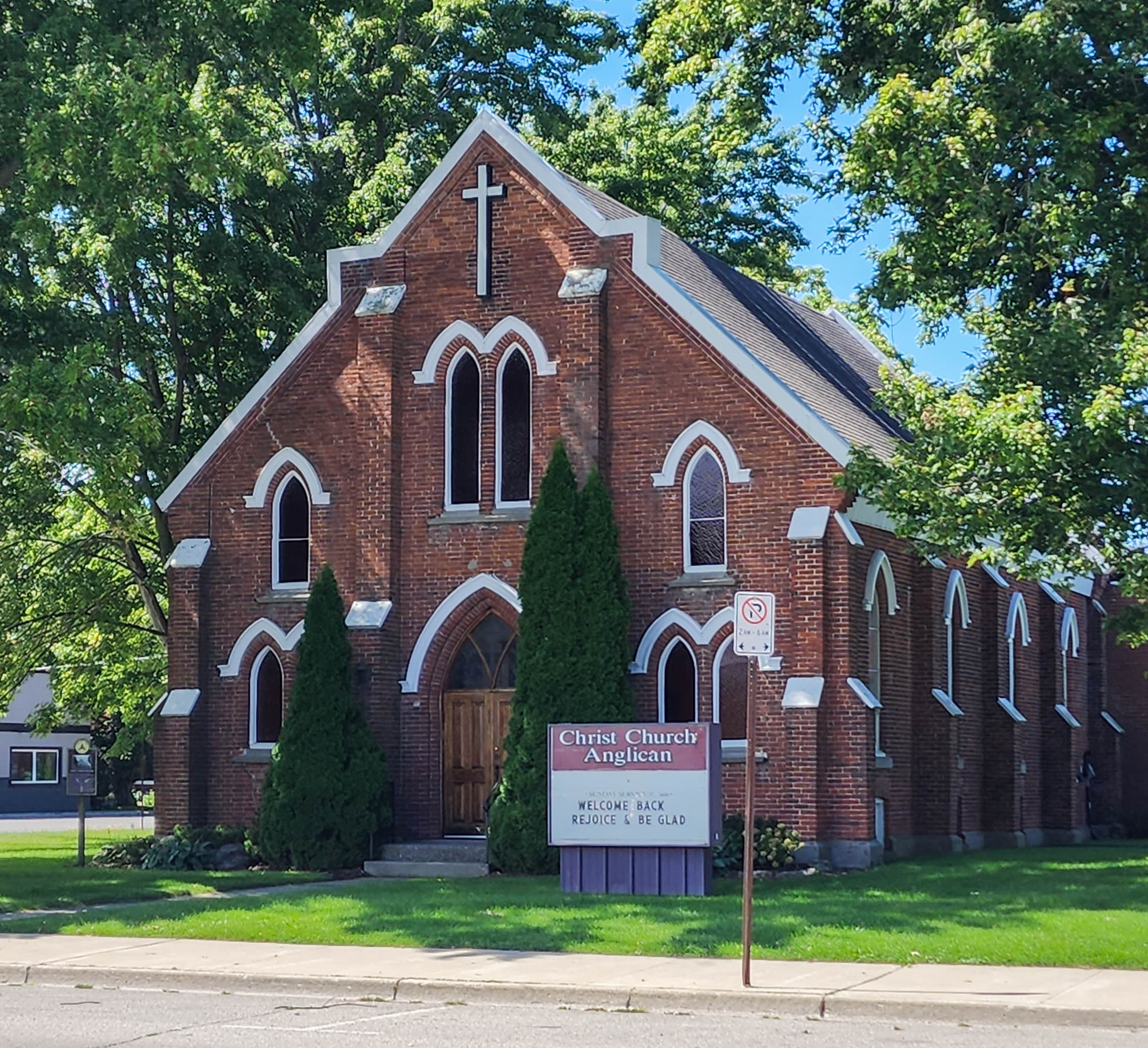
Christ Church, Dresden (1867–1868)

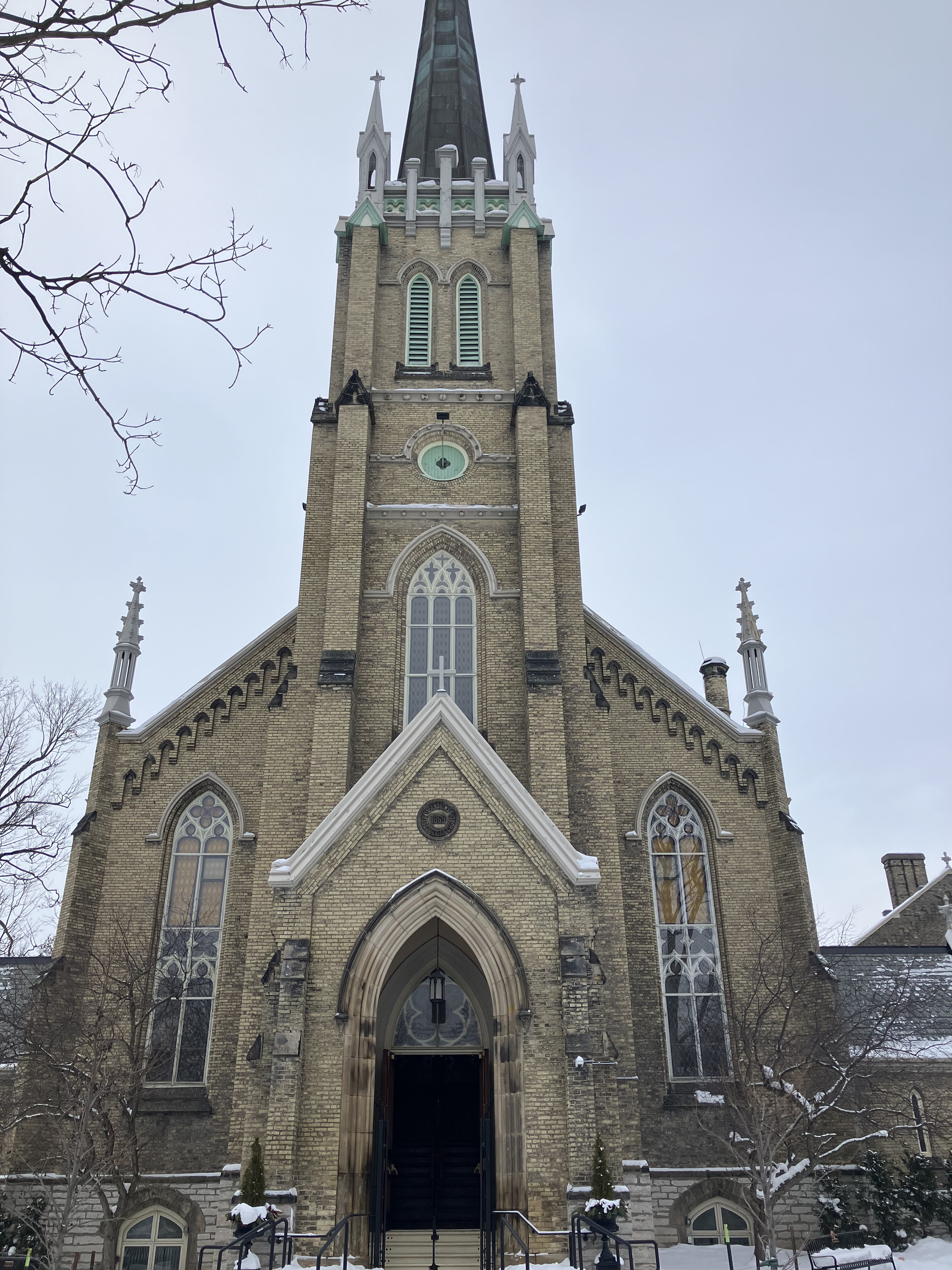
St Andrew's Presbyterian Church (1868–1869, 1871)

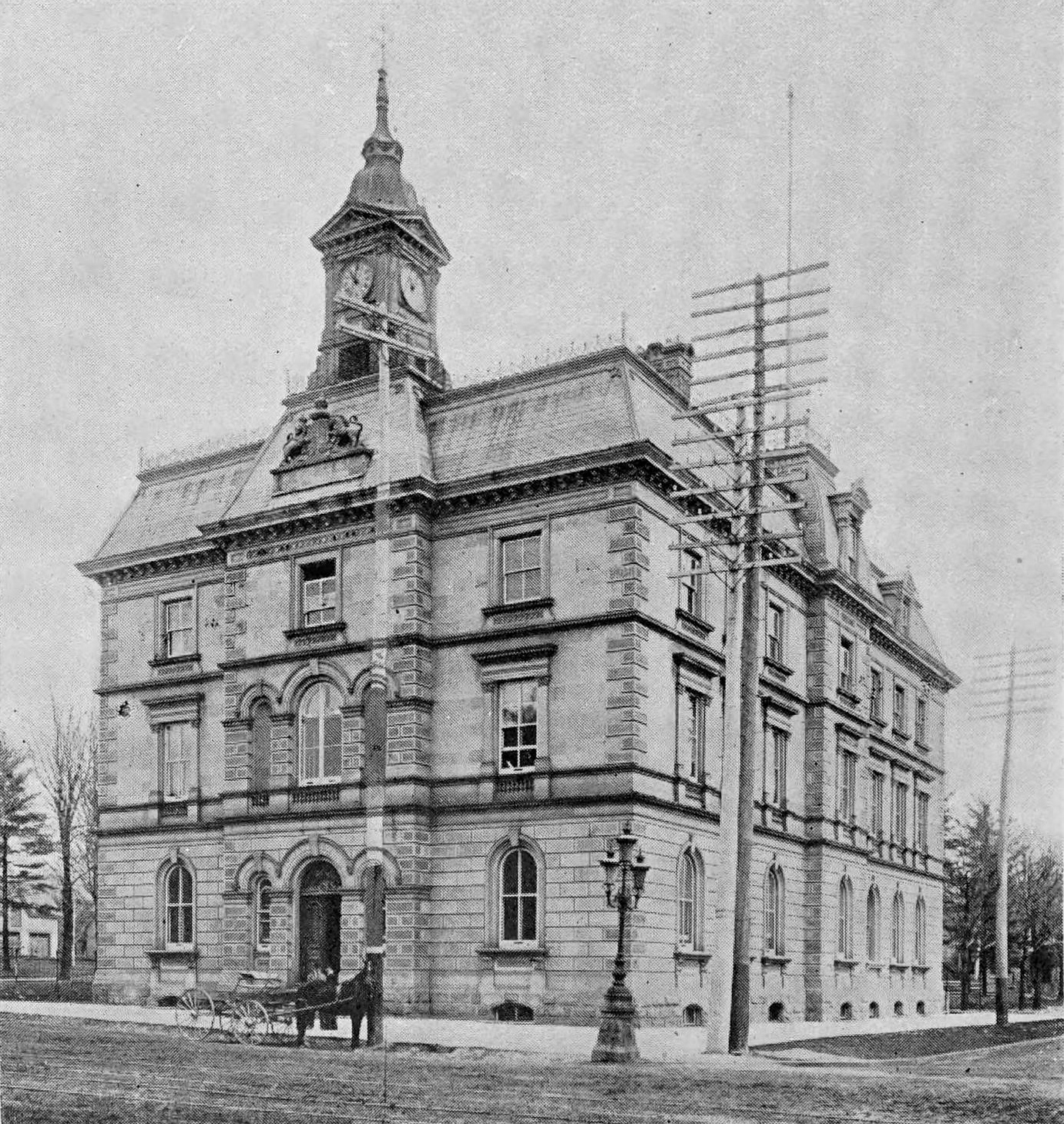
Custom House (1870–1873, with later additions, now demolished)

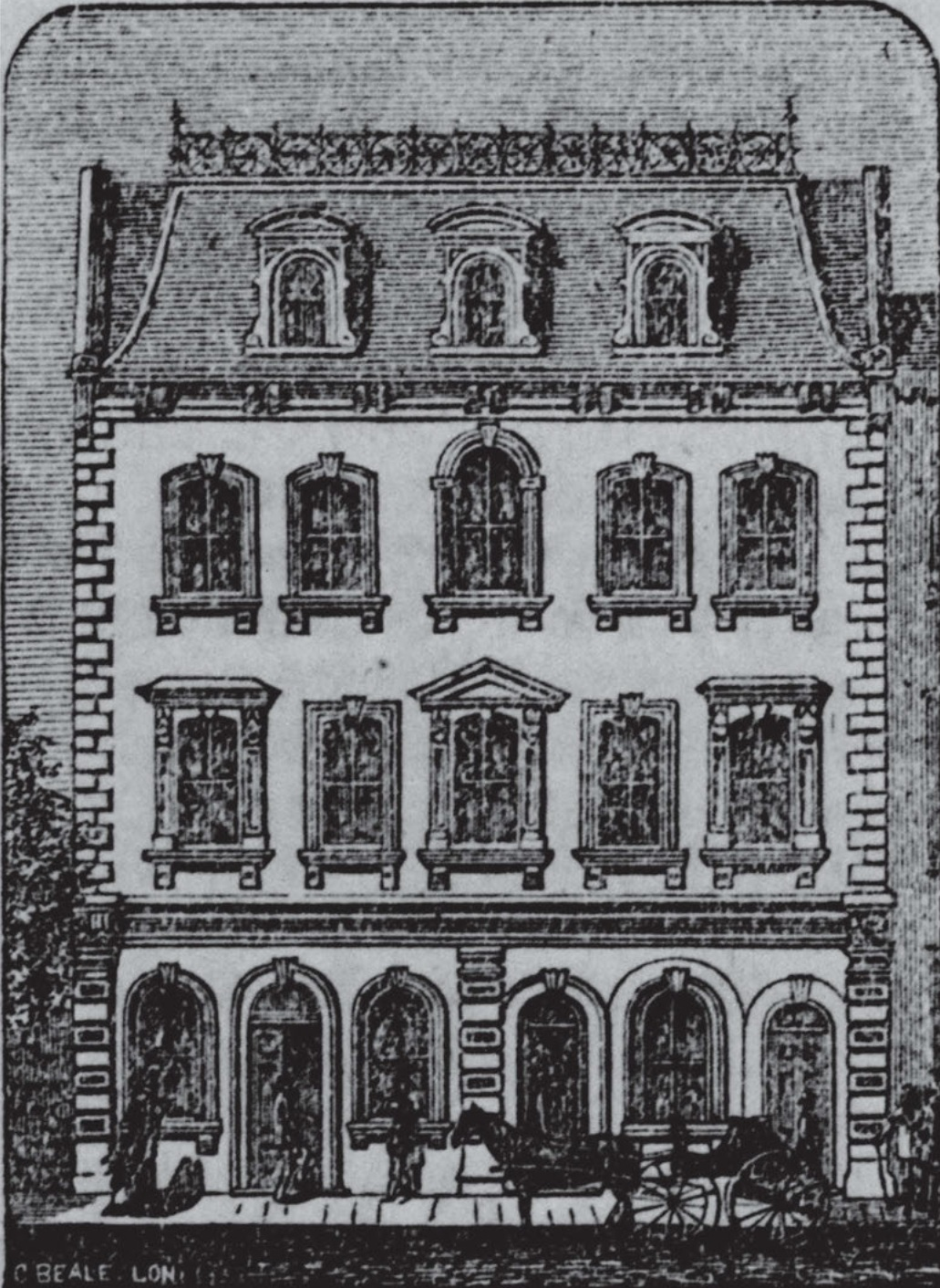
Huron and Erie Savings and Loan Society (1870–1871, now demolished)

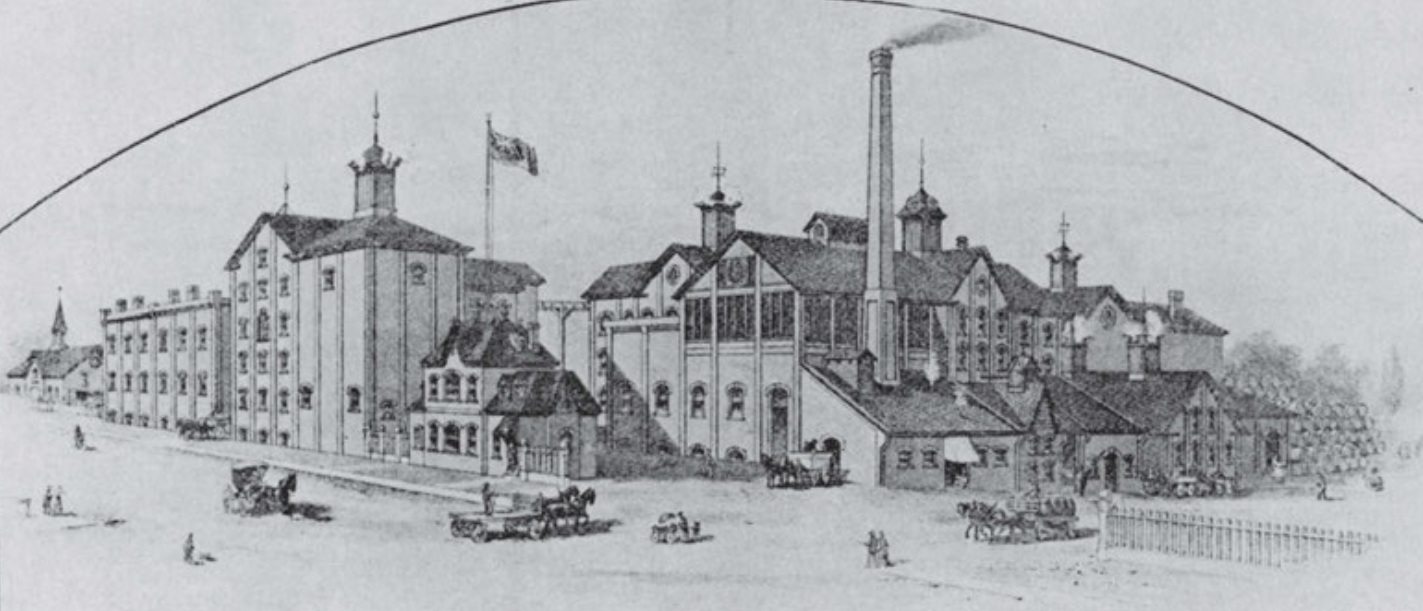
Labatt's Brewery, London (1874)

== Works cited ==
- "Christ Anglican Church". Canada's Historic Places. Parks Canada. Archived from the original on April 11, 2026.
- Gibb, Alice (1989). Brackets & Bargeboards, London: Architectural Walks in London, Ontario. London, Ontario: Architectural Conservancy of Ontario. ISBN 978-0-929026-02-2.
- History of the County of Middlesex, Canada. Toronto and London: W. A. & C. L. Goodspeed. 1889.
- "Old Waterloo South Primary Public School". Canada's Historic Places. Parks Canada. Archived from the original on April 11, 2026.
- Tausky, Nancy Z.; Distefano, Lynne D. (2018). Victorian Architecture in London and Southwestern Ontario: Symbols of Aspiration. Toronto: University of Toronto Press. doi:10.3138/j.ctvfrxbbj. ISBN 978-1-4875-8257-9.
