= Hadley Williams =

British-born Canadian surgeon and medical educator (1864–1932)

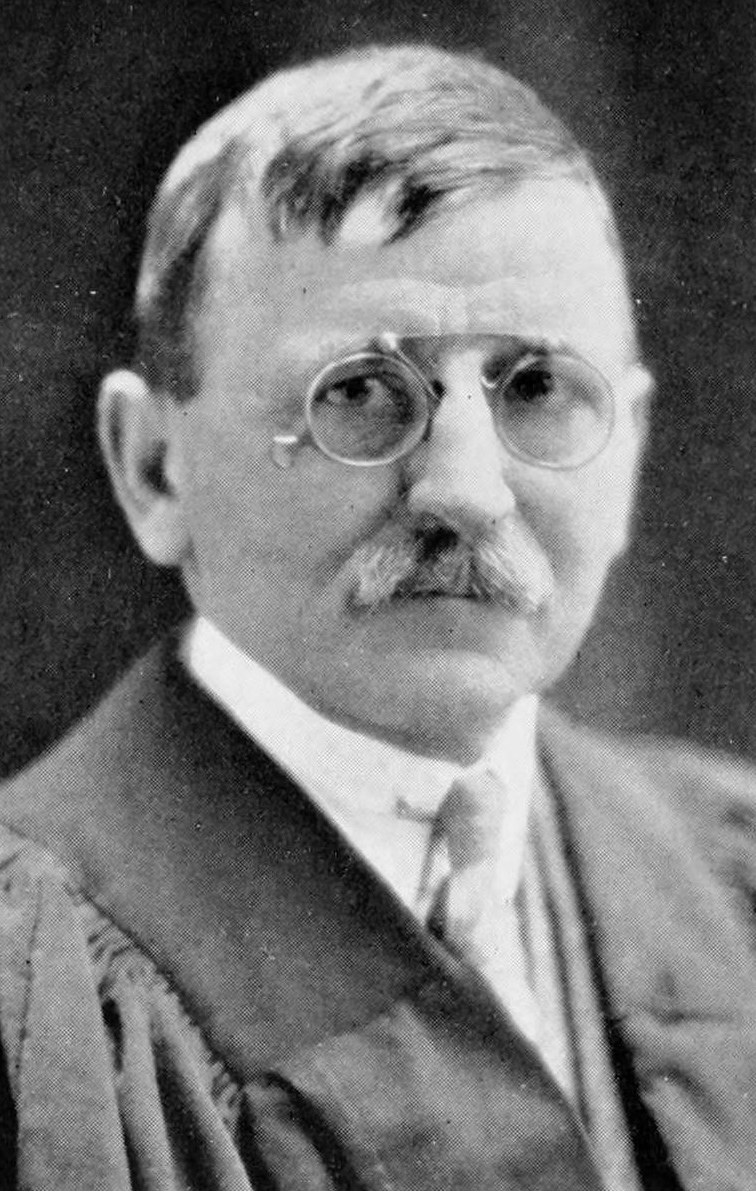
- Born: Henry Thomas Hadley Williams; 14 February 1864; St Giles in the Wood, Devon, England
- Died: 23 February 1932 (aged 68); London, Ontario, Canada
- Education: Schulich School of Medicine and Dentistry
- Occupations: Surgeon, teacher
- Spouse: Elsie Perrin (m. 1905)

Henry Thomas Hadley Williams (14 February 1864 – 23 February 1932) was a British-born Canadian surgeon and medical teacher in London, Ontario. He was head of surgery at the University of Western Ontario, surgeon to Victoria Hospital, and a member of the staff of St. Joseph's Hospital.

== Biography ==
Williams was born at St Giles, a village in the town of Torrington, Devon, to Thomas Hadley Williams and Rachel Brimsmead on 14 February 1864. He was educated at West Buckland College, before emigrating to London, Ontario, in Canada. He studied medicine at Western Medical College, spending time as a student lecturer before his graduation in 1889.

After graduation, Williams travelled to London in the United Kingdom to continue his education. There, he became a Member of the Royal College of Surgeons of England in 1898 and a Fellow of the Royal College of Surgeons of England in 1899. Williams had returned to London, Ontario, by the early 1900s. In 1903, he was made an associate professor at the Department of Anatomy at Western College. In 1910, Williams became professor of surgery, during a period of increased professionalization after Western received poor grades in a review conducted by Abraham Flexner. In July 1913, Williams was part of a committee headed by Dr. Hugh A. McCallum that examined the reform of the medical school. Williams was one of the original Fellows of the American College of Surgeons in 1913, the same year he was made the head of the department of surgery at Western. He was also a member of the Medical Alumni Association, serving as its president in 1910.

During the First World War, Williams served as a lieutenant-colonel in the Canadian Expeditionary Force. He worked at the Ontario Military Hospital (No. 16 Canadian General Hospital) in Orpington, Kent, serving as Officer-in-Charge of Surgery. After two years of military service, Williams returned to Western, where he served as consulting surgeon for the reintegration of soldiers. Williams was later appointed head of surgery at the University of Western Ontario, serving from the death of John Wishart in 1926 until Williams's retirement in 1931. Williams was a founding member of the Royal College of Physicians and Surgeons of Canada, serving on its first council. In 1929, he received an honorary doctor of laws degree. Outside of teaching, he was reported to have a busy practice, working at Victoria Hospital and St Joseph's Hospital.

== Personal life ==
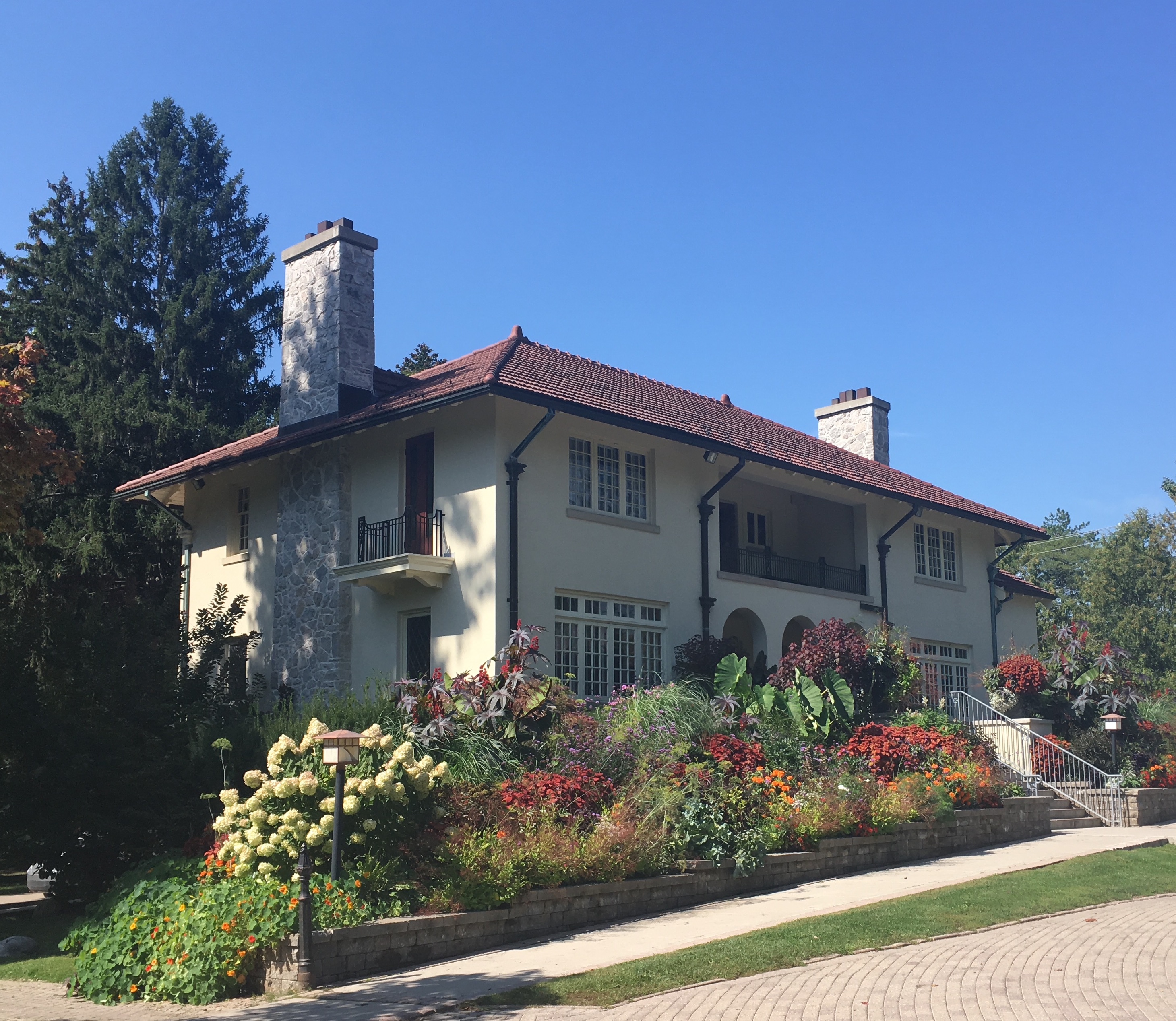
The Elsie Perrin Williams Estate at 101 Windermere Road (house designed by John Mackenzie Moore) was designated by the City of London under the Ontario Heritage Act in 1985.

Williams married Elsie Perrin, daughter of London industrialist Daniel Simmons Perrin, in 1905; they had no children. As a wedding gift, Perrin provided a large estate at Windermere in London, Ontario, which he had owned for several years. An avid golfer who had played international cricket in his youth, Williams installed a nine-hole golf course at the estate. He also frequently participated in tournaments in the region, including those hosted by the Canadian Senior Golfers, to whom he donated a trophy in 1931.

Williams died suddenly of coronary thrombosis in 1932 and was buried at the family estate after funeral services at Cronyn Memorial Church led by Rev. G. Quinton Warner. A portrait of Williams by Kenneth Forbes was commissioned by Elsie and presented to the University of Western Ontario. His duties at Victoria Hospital were assumed by John Cameron Wilson, who served concurrently as a member of provincial parliament.

Elsie died two years after her husband, in 1934, and was buried at his side. Upon her death, Elsie bequeathed much of her fortune to the city, with funds being used for a new wing for Victoria Hospital, a public library, and the Meek Laboratory. The Williams estate was donated to the city of London, with the intent that it be transformed into a park. The property was designated under the Ontario Heritage Act by the City of London in 1985.

== Selected publications ==
- Williams, Hadley (1895). Normal and Surgical Anatomy of the Vermiform Appendix. Philadelphia: Lea Brothers & Co.
