= Central North Correctional Centre =

Maximum security prison

- Interactive map of Central North Correctional Centre
- Location: Penetanguishene, Ontario, Canada; 44.79752°N 79.92306°W
- Status: Operational
- Security class: Medium/Maximum
- Capacity: 1,184
- Opened: 2001
- Managed by: Management and Training Corporation (2001–2006); Ministry of the Solicitor General (2006-)

The Central North Correctional Centre formerly known as "The Superjail" is a maximum security prison located in Penetanguishene, Ontario, Canada. During its period of private management from 2001 to 2006, it was the only privately-run adult correctional facility in Canada.

== History ==
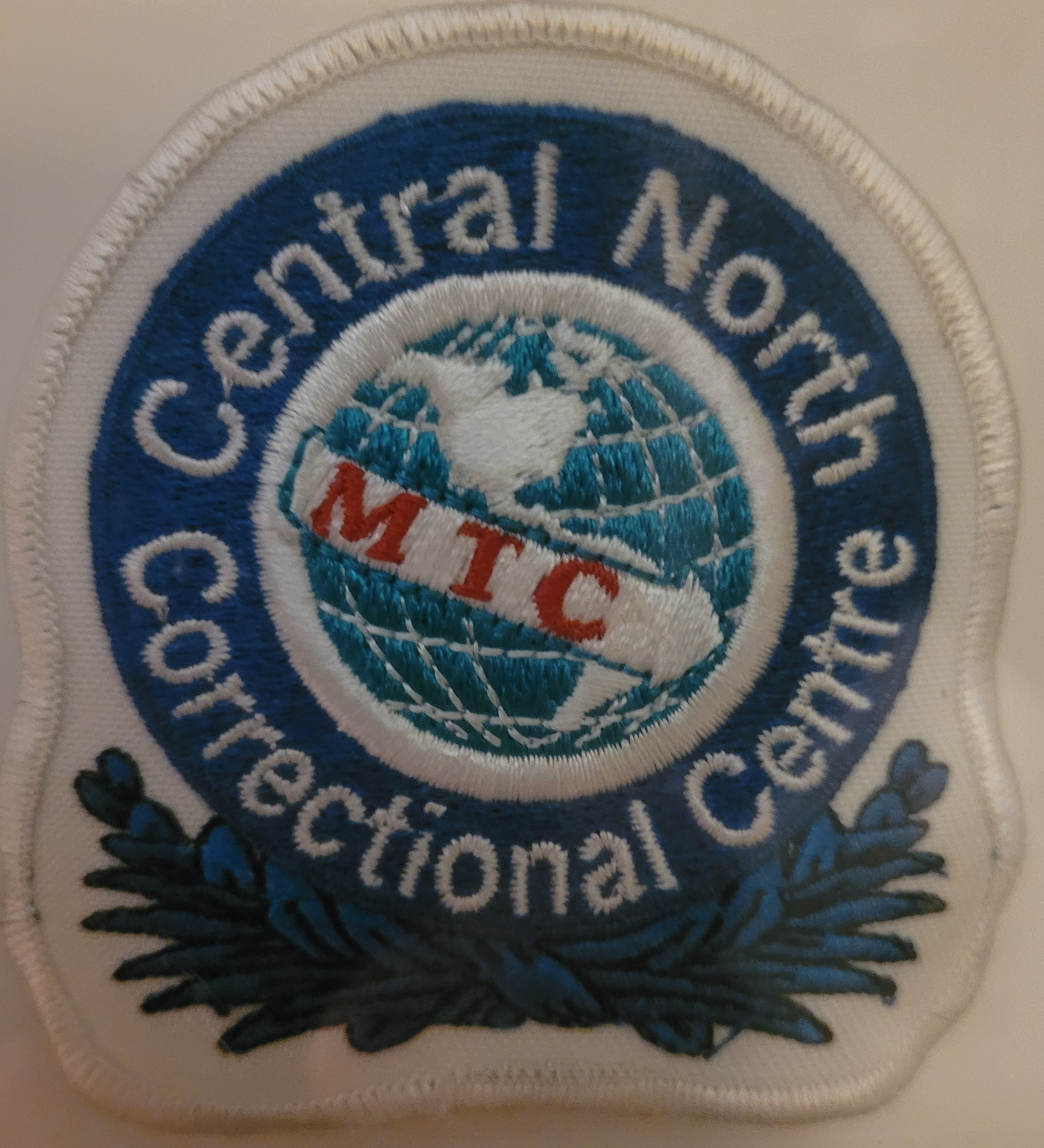
MTC CNCC patch that was changed

The Central North Correctional Centre was commissioned in November 2001 to replace the outdated Barrie Jail, Parry Sound Jail, and Guelph Correctional Centre. It opened as the first privately-operated correctional facility for adults in Canada. Management and Training Corporation Canada (MTCC), a subsidiary of the Centerville, Utah-based private prison firm Management and Training Corporation, was contracted by the provincial Ministry of Community Safety and Correctional Services to operate the facility for a five year pilot project.

Uniform patch from 2001 to 2006, while CNCC was privatized.

Over the course of its five years, it faced a reputation of being understaffed and failing to provide adequate meals, health care, or access to facilities to its prisoners. Staff was cut to two guards per 180 prisoners, and a week later on September 20, 2002, a riot occurred. Over one hundred prisoners attempted to escape the facility. The Ontario Provincial Police claimed they used a battering ram and homemade weapons to breach security but this was not confirmed by CNCC officials. No one did escape, with officials claiming the situation was controlled within two hours. A lockdown ensued, with prisoners only allowed out of their cells for brief periods; necessities like laundry and medications were not being received on time. After three months, units started returning to normal operations, with other units still on lock-down for an additional three months.

More claims of medical neglect would follow resulting in the formation of Families Against Private Prisons’ Abuse by Sharon Storring outraged that her son’s dressings on his wound were not changed daily like instructed, leading to an infection and putting his life at risk. Debbie Abbott also voiced complaints for her son Michael, who had suffered a mild concussion before entering the prison, but it went unattended resulting in frequent migraines and seizures that could last the rest of his life. Ryan Skillen claimed staff would not regularly replace the bandages on his wounded hand resulting in the loss of his middle and index fingers. John Kolakowski claimed his left earlobe was bitten off during a prison fight and did not receive medical attention within 90 minutes, leading him to launch a $150,000 lawsuit in October 2002. On August 29, 2003, prisoner Jeffrey Thomas Elliott was pronounced dead due to an infected wound on his hand. Although his wound was given some medical attention in the prison, the coroner’s jury determined that a lack of proper medical care, documentation, and sanitation were all contributing factors in his death.

Following the completion of the five-year term, the contract between the Ontario Government and MTCC was not renewed. The operation of the facility was turned over to the government on November 10, 2006, costing the province $4 million. Although a study showed it saved the province $23 million, it was ultimately determined that its public counterpart performed better in areas such as health care, security, providing more services, and reducing reoffending rates.

== See also ==
- List of correctional facilities in Ontario
