= Christ Church (London, Ontario) =

- Jesus Is Lord Church in London
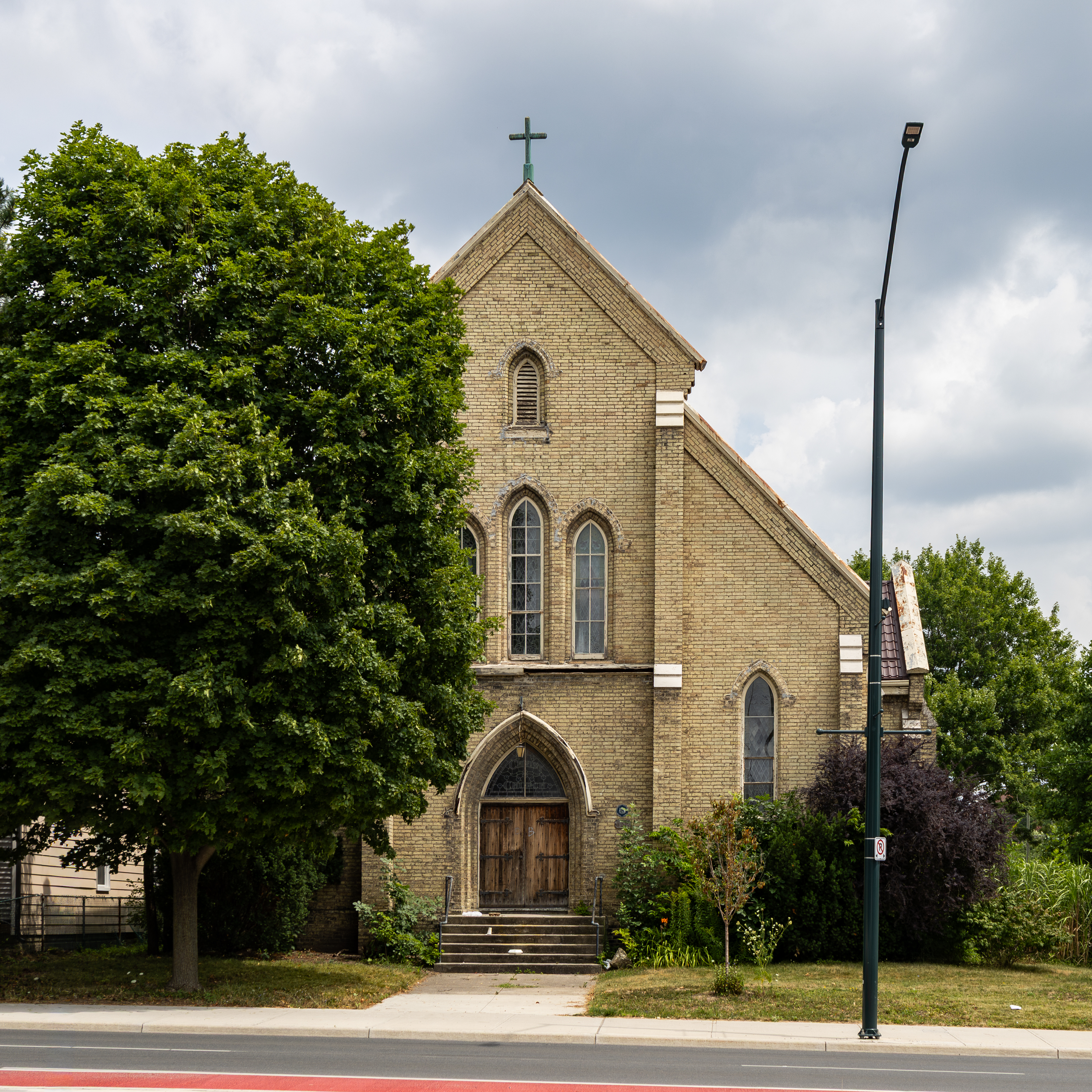
- Christ Church
- 42°58′37″N 81°14′27″W
- Country: Canada
- Denomination: Anglican Church of Canada (1863–2014); Jesus Is Lord Church

History
- Former name: Christ Church
- Founded: 1863

Architecture
- Architect: William Robinson
- Architectural type: High Victorian Gothic
- Construction cost: CA$4,000

Clergy
- Pastor: Elmer Ubalde; Maila Ubalde

The Jesus Is Lord Church in London, formerly known as Christ Church, is a Jesus Is Lord and former Anglican church in London, Ontario, Canada. Built between 1862 and 1863 based on a design by William Robinson, shortly after the establishment of the Diocese of Huron, Christ Church was the second Anglican church to be built in the city. It operated for over a hundred and fifty years, closing in 2014 after the congregation had dwindled to 25 members.

The two-storey church is built in the High Victorian Gothic style with a wooden structure and white brick exterior. Its western face is marked by three lancet windows that are framed by buttresses that coincide with the inner structure. The shallow chancel, which includes a gallery and staircase, has three stained glass windows on its eastern wall. In 2007, the church was designated under the Ontario Heritage Act.

== Description ==
Christ Church is located at 138 Wellington Street in London, Ontario, Canada, at the northeastern corner of Wellington and Hill. The area was developed as part of London's southern expansion. It was the second Anglican church built in the city, after St. Paul's Cathedral, though the city later expanded to include areas that had Anglican churches older than this one.

Christ Church is a two-storey building in locally sourced white brick built in the High Victorian Gothic style. The western facade features three lancet windows, which are topped with Gothic transoms and framed with wooden hood moulds and windowsills. This facade is divided by the buttresses and spatial arrangement into three sections, coinciding with the internal supports that separate the nave and side aisles. The south face features a porch along a side wall. The building is topped by a hip roof, which includes white-capped gables atop brick friezes, as well as a chimney on the north side.

Inside, Christ Church features pointed arches along the length of the church. These are supported by octagonal wooden columns. Further support is provided by wooden beams and rafters. The shallow chancel includes a gallery and staircase, as well as another pointed arch. Along the chancel's eastern wall are another three windows, made of stained glass and featuring floral and geometric patterns, which are believed to date to 1863.

== History ==
The Diocese of Huron was established in 1857, with St. Paul's as its cathedral. The nascent diocese sought to build a new church and establish a new parish. For this, Reverend George M. Innes was appointed by Bishop Benjamin Cronyn. Innes worked without salary, raising funds in the United Kingdom, and later hosting outdoor services on grounds donated by Cronyn. In a later speech, he recalled a group of children filling the hollow tree stump used as a pulpit with leaves and lighting it, interrupting the service and forcing the priest to descend.

Construction on Christ Church began in 1862 using the grounds donated by Cronyn. The building was designed by William Robinson, a local architect. Having practiced architecture since the 1850s, Robinson had designed numerous churches; most of these had been for Presbyterian ministries. Working with a strict budget and with an eye to liturgical requirements, Robinson completed his design, which he adapted for his later Anglican churches, such as one in Dresden (built 1867–1868).

Christ Church was completed in 1863 at a cost of CA$4,000 (equivalent to $80,000 in 2025). Part of this was raised by the women's committee through subscriptions, while CA$500 (equivalent to $10,000 in 2025) had been raised by Innes in the United Kingdom; no debt was incurred. The church was consecrated that year. Expansions included a church hall in 1879 and a gallery before 1887. Upon his death in 1894, Robinson left CA$800 (equivalent to $34,000 in 2025) to Christ Church to help pay off these expenses.

In 1877, Christ Church hosted a meeting of professors and alumni from Huron College that led to the establishment of the University of Western Ontario. Under Rector J. W. P. Smith, the congregation helped raise funds for the new university. In the 20th century, a commemorative plaque was installed at Christ Church to commemorate the university's 75th anniversary. Christ Church was designated by the City of London under the Ontario Heritage Act in 2007. That year, a new memorial window by Ted Gooden was installed, as well as an artwork by Kim Harrison; by this point, the church included several windows by Gooden, which included a series on the Genesis creation narrative.

In 2014, Christ Church church was closed after its Easter services; at the time, the church reported a congregation of 25 members. The Diocese of Huron announced that Christ Church would be sold after being deconsecrated. As of 2025, the building is occupied by the London chapter of the Philippines-based Jesus Is Lord Church. The congregation is led by pastors Elmer and Maila Ubalde.

== Works cited ==
- Benedict, Ben (November 21, 2007). "Christ Church Celebrates Its Heritage Status" (PDF). The Londoner. p. 11. Archived from the original (PDF) on April 27, 2026.
- "Christ Anglican Church". Canada's Historic Places. Parks Canada. Archived from the original on April 11, 2026.
- "Jesus Is Lord Over London". Jesus Is Lord Church. Archived from the original on April 27, 2026.
- Martin, Chip (April 26, 2014). "The Building Can't Go on the Real Estate Market until It's Deconsecrated in June". The London Free Press. Archived from the original on April 27, 2026.
- Trevithick, Matthew (April 27, 2025). "'We Pray for Justice': London Filipino Community Reacts to Vancouver Vehicle Attack". CBC. Archived from the original on April 27, 2026.
- Tausky, Nancy Z.; Distefano, Lynne D. (2018). Victorian Architecture in London and Southwestern Ontario: Symbols of Aspiration. Toronto: University of Toronto Press. doi:10.3138/j.ctvfrxbbj. ISBN 978-1-4875-8257-9.
