= Thomas Young (architect) =

English-born Canadian architect

Thomas Young (1805-October 3, 1860) was an English born Canadian architect who practiced in Canada and built public buildings in early 19th-Century Toronto.

== Life ==
Born in 1805, Young began training in London under Charles Heathcote Tatham and under Joseph Bramah and Sons. He moved to Toronto where he would be commissioned to build in Toronto and around Southern Ontario.

During 1840-1843, Young worked for the City of Toronto as a surveyor and architect and the survey lines on his 1841 survey of the shoreline of Lake Ontario in what is now centre of the City of Toronto continue to show on property surveys of the City as "Top of the Bank" and Water's Edge".

== Buildings involving Young ==
- Wellington County Jail - Guelph 1839–1840; designer but built by William Day and partially demolished in 1911 for new jailhouse.
- Huron Historic Gaol - Goderich, Ontario 1839–1842, closed 1972 and now a museum.
- Guelph Gaol - Guelph, Ontario c 1840; closed 1980.
- Simcoe District Jail - Barrie, Ontario 1841; closed 2001 but facility is part of Superior Court of Justice of Ontario courthouse complex
- Trinity Church - Streetsville, Ontario 1842
- St. Andrew's Market and Playground - Toronto 1849; destroyed by fire in 1860
- King's College Building 1842-1845 - became an Asylum in 1851 and demolished in 1886 and now site of Ontario Legislative Building
  - University of Toronto Anatomical School - 1850, renamed Moss Hall in 1880 and demolished in 1888 for Biological Building c 1890 (demolished 1950 and now Medical Sciences Building)
- St. Patrick's Market - 1854; replaced by current structure in 1912.

== Personal ==
Young had six children with Mary Cordelia and died in Toronto in 1860.
