= London Life Building =

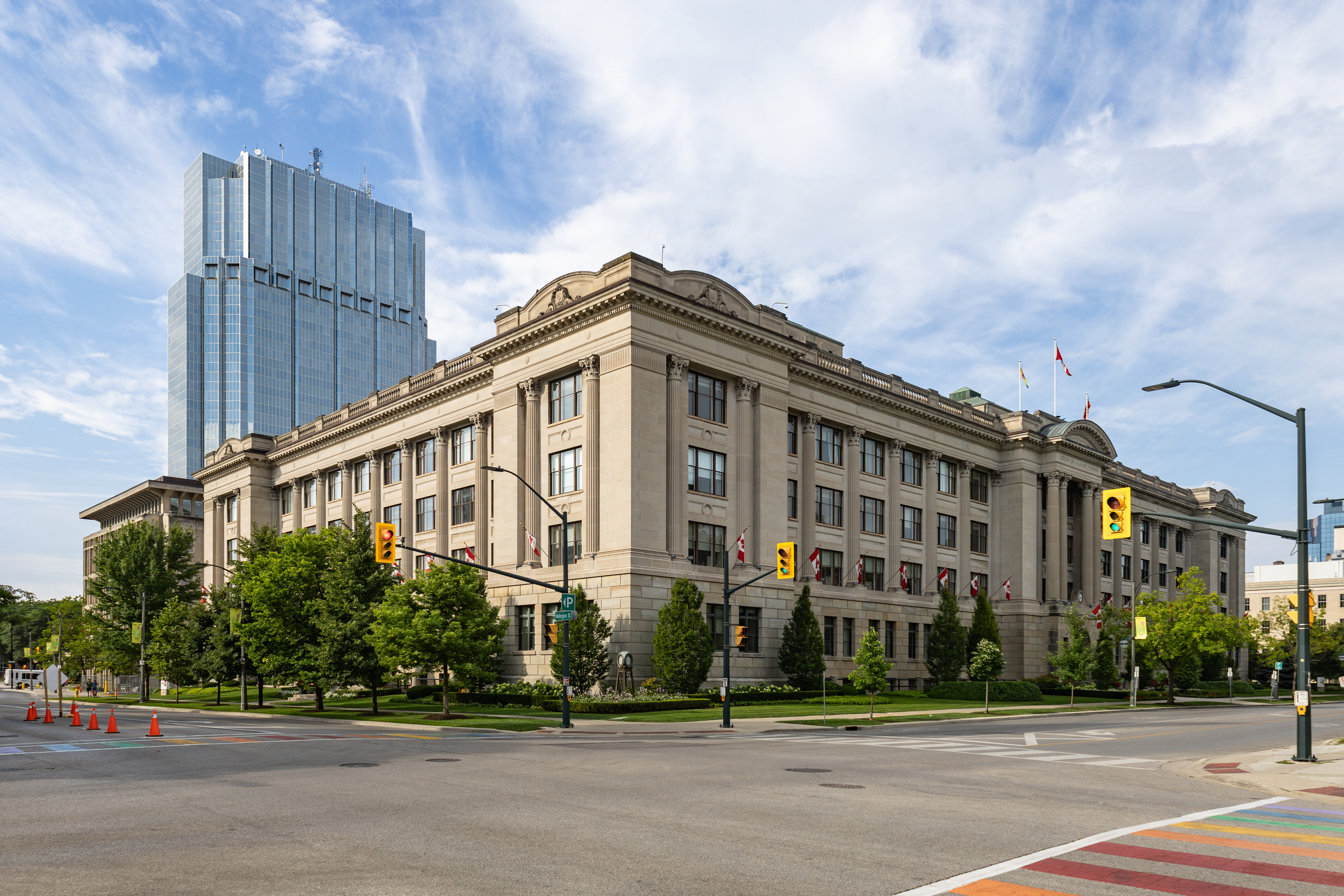
- The London Life Building, with One London Place in the background

General information
- Location: 255 Dufferin Avenue, London, Ontario, Canada
- Coordinates: 42°59′13″N 81°14′50″W
- Year built: 1926–1927
- Inaugurated: 1928
- Owner: Canada Life

Design and construction
- Architect: John Mackenzie Moore

The London Life Building, also known as the Canada Life Building, (Note: In 2019, London Life announced a rebranding as Canada Life, having joined with the latter in 2003, as part of a consolidation effort (Dubinski 2019). The rebranding came into effect on January 1, 2020 (Canada Life, Our History).) is an office building in London, Ontario, Canada, that previously served as the headquarters of the London Life Insurance Company. Construction on the building, designed by John Mackenzie Moore in the Neo-Classical Revival style, began in 1926. It was dedicated by Lieutenant-Governor William Donald Ross in 1928. Its five storeys covered 102,000 square feet (9,500 m^{2}) and included office space, an auditorium, and recreational facilities. Expansions to the building were completed in 1948, 1952, and 1964, with further renovations undertaken in the 1980s and 2020s.

== Description ==
The London Life Building is located at 255 Dufferin Avenue, on the corner of Dufferin and Wellington Street, south of Victoria Park, with expansions bringing the building south to Queen's Avenue. The five-storey original building is constructed with limestone imported from Indiana, on a steel frame, with Queenston stone facing the first floor. Along the facade are four Corinthian columns measuring approximately 35 feet (11 m) tall and 3 feet (0.91 m) in diameter, which surround the front entrance, and half-columns along the upper storeys. The building is the Beaux-Arts style of Neo-Classical Revival architecture, and features a balustrade along the facades facing Dufferin and Wellington.

The inner rotunda of the London Life Building is walled in Steinway marble, with Bancroft marble lining the bottom 3.5 feet (1.1 m) of the corridors and stair walls. Plaster was used for offices and the upper portions of the walls. Mahogany was used for the board room, while painted brick was used in the basement. Floors used a range of materials. Italian travertine with inlays of Belgian black marble was used for the rotunda, while office spaces were floored primarily in linoleum on a concrete base. The auditorium had a hardwood floor, while the board room, general manager's office, executive committee room, and waiting room had cork floors.

At the time of its opening, the London Life Building had 102,000 square feet (9,500 m^{2}) of floor space, with another 4,860 square feet (452 m^{2}) for the boiler house. On the top floor, an auditorium with a capacity of 750 was built, providing space for work-related conferences as well as plays, dances, and other social activities. The monogram of the London Life Company was included in several elements, including the lighting fixtures, and the company's initials were engraved on the doorknobs. Elevators from the Turnbull Elevator Company provided access between floors, while pneumatic pipes transported inter-office mail and dedicated print shop served company needs.

== History ==
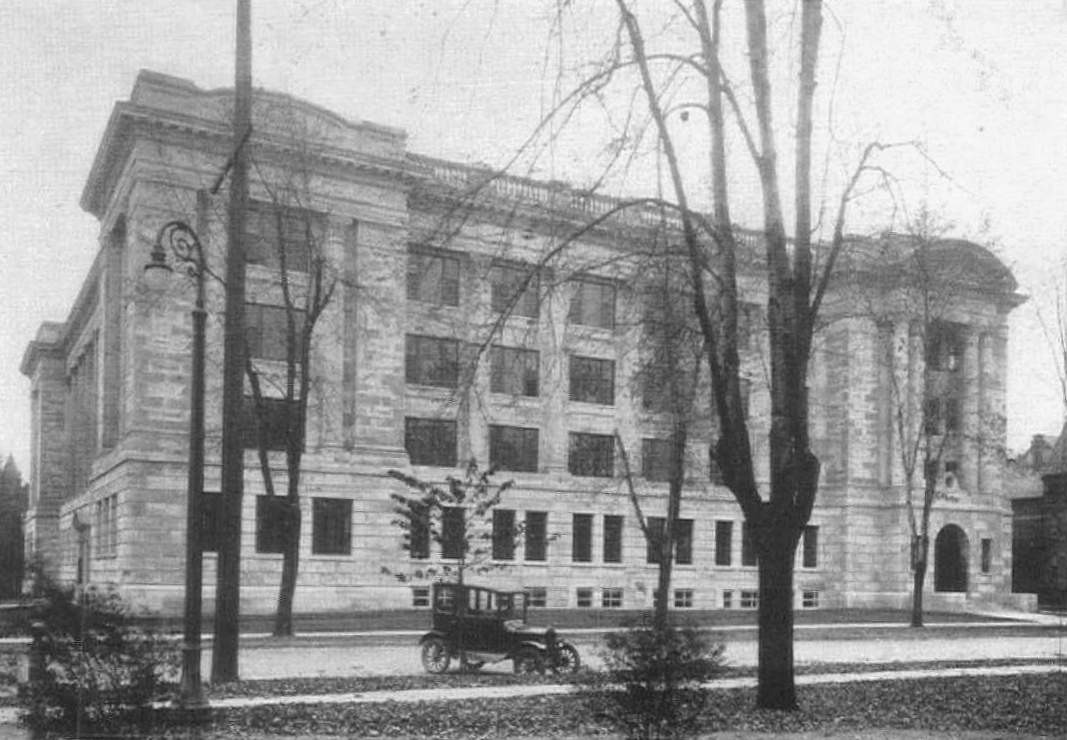
The London Life Building in 1930

=== Construction ===
The London Life Insurance Company was established in 1874. Its offices were initially located at the Ontario Loan Building. In 1906, the company moved to 424 Wellington Street. After continued growth, in the 1920s it began to acquire land near Victoria Park for new headquarters; these included the former residences of George Christie Gibbons, William McDonough, and John William Little. The city council initially opposed the construction of commercial offices near the park, but it relented after London Life threatened to relocate to Hamilton or Toronto. In 1926, A. O. Jeffery, the president of the London Life Company, laid the cornerstone for the new headquarters. The company occupied its new headquarters from September 1927, and the building was officially opened by Lieutenant-Governor William Donald Ross in 1928.

The London Life Building was designed by the firm of John Mackenzie Moore in London. Construction was handled by the Hamilton-based Yates Construction Co., while painting was completed by W. T. Pace & Son of London. Reports of the final cost vary; a special in The Financial Post reported that London Life spent approximately C$1 million (equivalent to $18,000,000 in 2025) for its new headquarters, while a biography of Moore by Nancy Tausky and Lynne Distefano gives a final cost of C$750,000 (equivalent to $13,500,000 in 2025). The industry periodical Canadian Insurance dedicated a sixteen-page issue to the building in 1928, and Contract Record and Engineering Review described it as "one of the most handsome buildings erected in Canada in recent years."

=== Subsequent history ===
The London Life Building was used as the headquarters of the London Life Company. Its first storey held the offices of the field service, accounting, auditing, and investment departments, as well as the board room and executive offices. Offices on the second and third storeys were used by collections and records, as well as the actuarial, industrial, policy, and underwriting departments. The fourth storey was dominated by the auditorium. The basement included locker rooms, printing facilities, janitorial services, and storehouses. The main vault, consisting of 3.5-foot (1.1 m) thick concrete walls, floors, and ceilings, reinforced with steel and iron rods, was also located in the basement. Facilities for staff included individual club rooms for male and female employees, which were kept open after-hours for bridge and other games, as well as four bowling lanes in the basement. Showers were also provided. Drinking water was provided through a refrigerated water system.

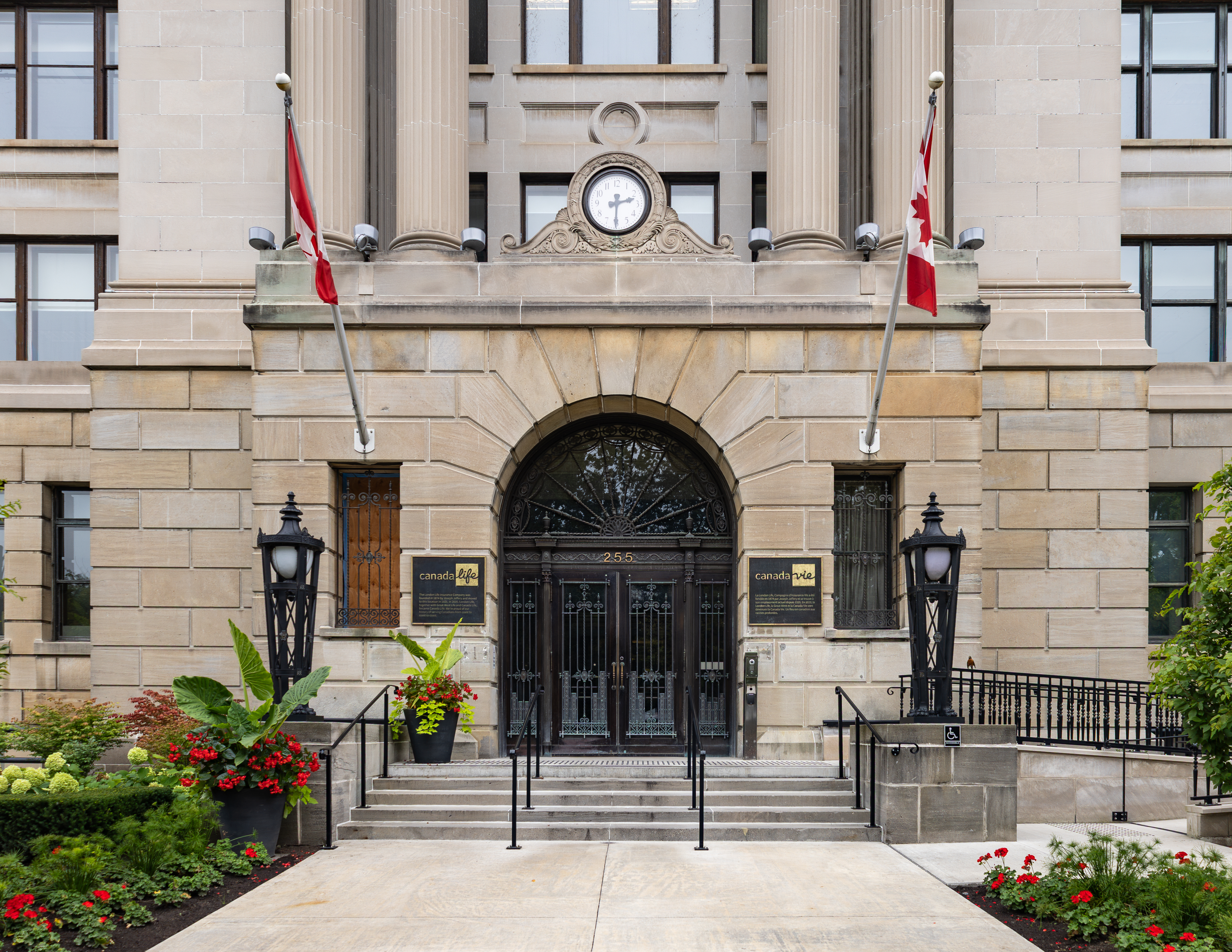
The Dufferin Avenue entrance; the accessibility ramp installed in the 2020s is visible to the right

The central courtyard was designed to accommodate a complementary structure should available space become required, with the "L"-shaped footprint of the original structure to be developed into a "U" shape without any need for further alterations. A seven-storey extension was completed in 1948, with another extension following in 1951. In 1964, another addition was completed by the Toronto-based firm of Marani, Morris & Allan, which included accessibility features previously lacking. These additions were designed to match the original building, and Dave LeBlanc of The Globe and Mail described the 1964 addition as "highly compatible".

In 1982, the London Life Building was modernized, with renovations costing C$18 million (equivalent to $53,800,000 in 2025). These renovations included the installation of computers and other electronic means of communication. Further renovations were undertaken in the 2020s by ERA Architects to improve the accessibility of the Dufferin Avenue entrance. Installed during this renovation were an accessibility ramp, tactile tiles, and a glass accessibility lift within the front entrance. ERA received an award from London Heritage for its efforts to maintain the original design.

Aside from serving as headquarters of the London Life Company, the building has been used for other purposes. In October 1974, during Exercise London—a mock disaster staged to develop a municipal disaster plan—the building was used as a temporary morgue for participants identified as casualties. In 2019, the roof was used for apiaries, providing a staging point for honeybees accessing the building's gardens and Victoria Park.

== Works cited ==
- "2024 Award Recipients". London Heritage Awards. 2024. Archived from the original on August 6, 2026.
- Armstrong, Frederick Henry (1986). The Forest City: An Illustrated History of London, Canada. Northridge, California: Windsor Publications. ISBN 978-0-89781-180-4.
- Baker, Michael (1998). Downtown London: Layers of Time. London, Ontario: City of London and London Regional Art and Historical Museums. ISBN 978-1-895800-72-2.
- Bieman, Jennifer (August 29, 2019). "Canada Life's London Rooftop Abuzz with Environment Project". The London Free Press. Archived from the original on August 6, 2026.
- "Canada Life Assurance Company" (Map). Google Maps.
- "Chilled Water System Obviates Much Confusion". The Financial Post. Vol. XXL, no. 51. December 23, 1927. p. 38.
- Dubinski, Kate (April 3, 2019). "London Life Insurance Company to be Called Canada Life". CBC. Archived from the original on August 6, 2026.
- "Four Bowling Alleys, Spacious Club Rooms Build Company Spirit". The Financial Post. Vol. XXL, no. 51. December 23, 1927. p. 38.
- Gibb, Alice (1989). Brackets & Bargeboards, London: Architectural Walks in London, Ontario. London, Ontario: Architectural Conservancy of Ontario. ISBN 978-0-929026-02-2.
- "Handsome Office Structure in London, Ont". Contract Record and Engineering Review. Vol. 48, no. 4. January 25, 1928. pp. 72–75.
- "Interesting Features of the London Life Head Office". The Financial Post. Vol. XXL, no. 51. December 23, 1927. p. 42.
- "Italian Lava and Linoleum Vie in Floors". The Financial Post. Vol. XXL, no. 51. December 23, 1927. p. 42.
- LeBlanc, Dave (May 2, 2014). "London Modern, for Your Consideration". The Globe and Mail. p. G4. ProQuest 1520309887 – via ProQuest.
- "New London Life Building". The Eastern Underwriter. March 2, 1928. p. 12.
- "Our History – London Life". Canada Life. Archived from the original on August 6, 2026.
- "Spacious Auditorium Fills Need for Hall for Staff Conferences". The Financial Post. Vol. XXL, no. 51. December 23, 1927. p. 39.
- Sutherland, Stewart (May–June 1975). "Exercise London" (PDF). Emergency Planning Digest. Ottawa. pp. 11–13. Archived from the original (PDF) on August 6, 2026.
- Tausky, Nancy Z.; Distefano, Lynne D. (2018). Victorian Architecture in London and Southwestern Ontario: Symbols of Aspiration. Toronto: University of Toronto Press. ISBN 978-1-4875-8257-9. JSTOR 10.3138/j.ctvfrxbbj.
- "This Million Dollar Building Is Proving Sound Investment". The Financial Post. Vol. XXL, no. 51. December 23, 1927. p. 33.
- "Walls Range from Marble to Hard, Painted Plaster". The Financial Post. Vol. XXL, no. 51. December 23, 1927. p. 38.
