= Elsie Perrin Williams Estate =

Estate in London, Ontario, Canada

Coordinates: 43°00′37″N 81°17′28″W

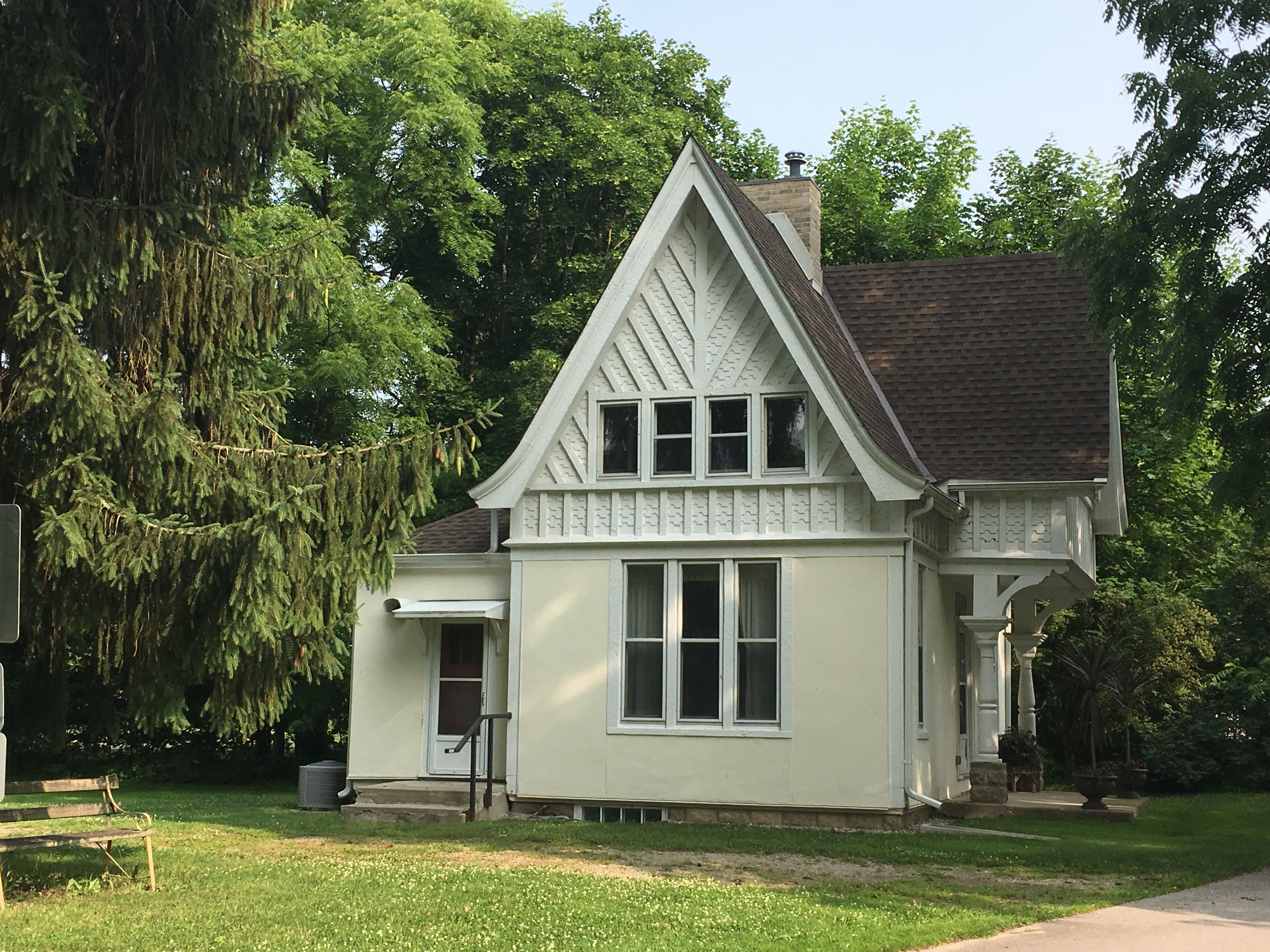
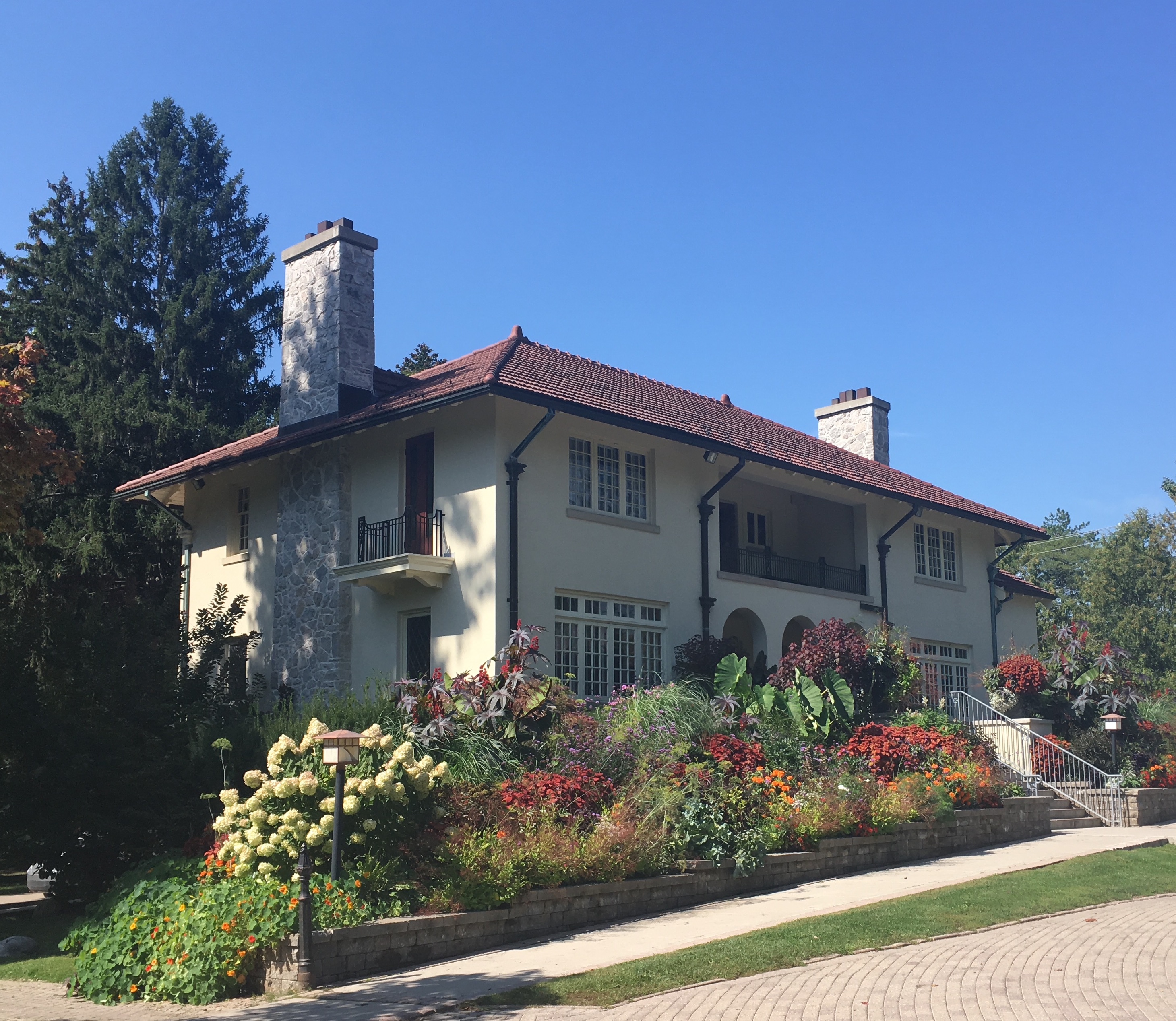
The designated buildings on the estate: the gatehouse (left) and residence (right)

The Elsie Perrin Williams Estate, also known as Windermere, is an estate in London, Ontario, Canada. First developed by Sheriff William Glass in the 1870s, in 1893 the property was purchased by the industrialist Daniel Simmons Perrin circa 1893 and used as a summer home. When Perrin's daughter Elsie married Hadley Williams in 1903, the estate was given to them. The couple replaced the earlier residence with one in the Spanish Colonial Revival style in 1916, and added to it in the 1920s.

After the Williamses' death in 1932 and 1934, respectively, the estate was bequeathed to the City of London along with an endowment for maintenance. It was not taken until 1979, after the death of the Williamses' housekeeper, at which time the residence was dilapidated. In 1985, three structures on the property—the residence, gatehouse, and coach house—were designated under the Ontario Heritage Act, though designation was removed from the coach house later that year. The estate is used as an event venue and a public park.

== Description ==
The Elsie Perrin Williams Estate is located at London, Ontario, Canada, within the Medway Valley Heritage Forest. The property overlooks Medway Creek The estate consists of two heritage buildings, a gatehouse and a residence. It is one of the few contemporary estates to survive in the London area.

The older of the two buildings, the gatehouse, is sided in tongue and groove boards with imitation half-timbering. It is topped by a cross gable roof, with the front gable extending beyond the walls and supported by large ornamented posts. Further ornamentation includes a cornice frieze.

The two-storey residential building, meanwhile, is in the Spanish Colonial Revival style. It has a symmetrical façade sided in stucco. It is topped with a roof tiled in red clay, which is supported by beamed ceilings in the main rooms. The building also featured balconies of wrought iron and trim in green wood. Inside, the fireplaces are adorned with glazed tiles.

== History ==
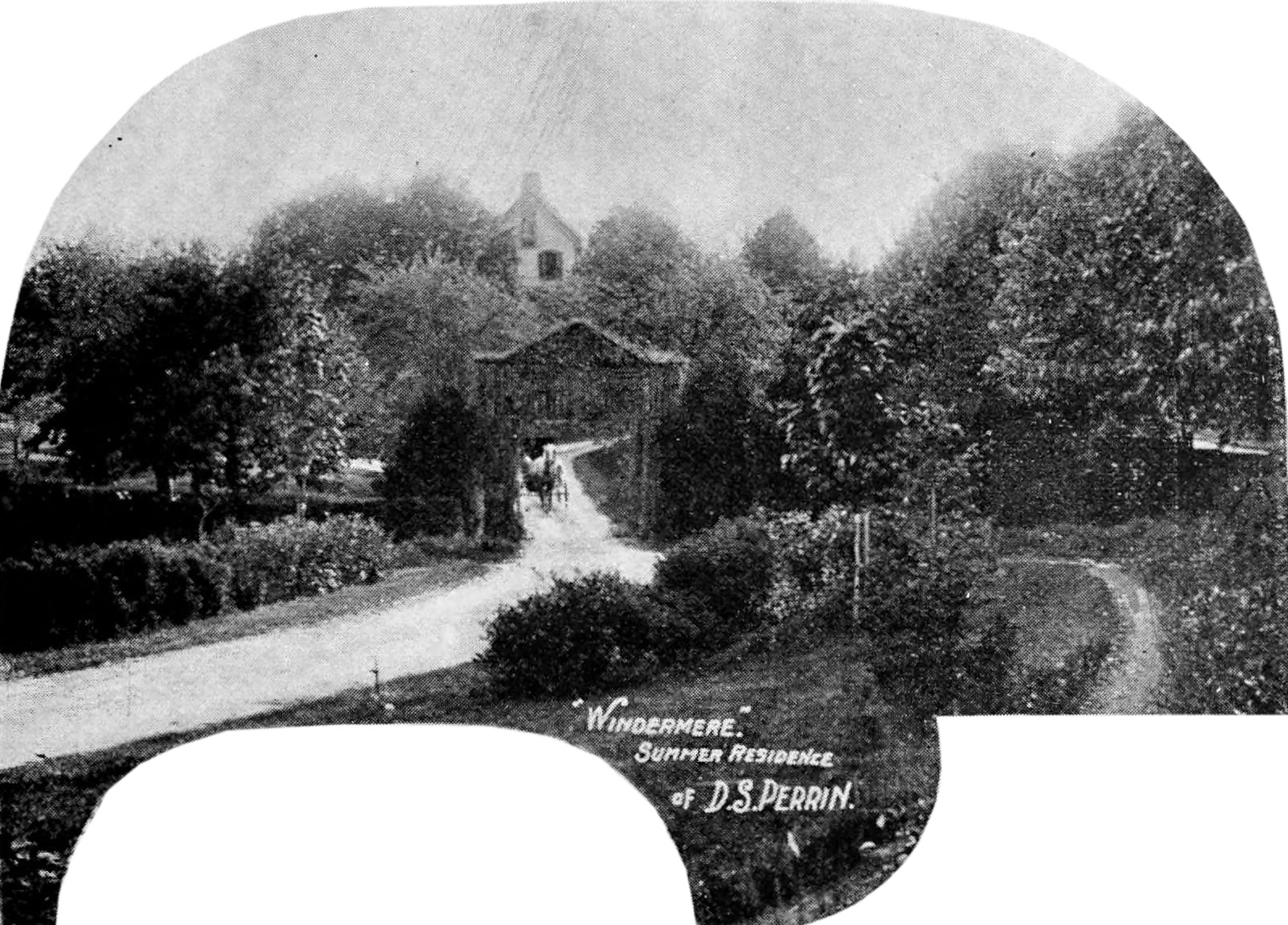
The estate as it appeared in 1895

The estate has been occupied since the 19th century. Among its former owners was the Middlesex County sheriff William Glass, who built a home and coach house in the 1870s. It was purchased by the industrialist Daniel Simmons Perrin circa 1893, who used it as a summer house; at the time, it consisted of 68 acres (28 ha). His teenage daughter Elsie designed the current gatehouse, which was constructed circa 1895. She likely had access to imported pattern books from the United States.

In 1903, Perrin gifted the estate to his daughter Elsie upon her marriage to the doctor Hadley Williams. While in Europe during the First World War, the couple demolished the existing structure and hired the local architect John Mackenzie Moore to design a new residence. Based on drawings by Elsie, he produced a two-storey residence with stucco walls, which was completed in 1916. The couple added a large hall in 1924, as well as a kitchen extension and a breezeway; these were likely handled by Moore. A drawing room, built in 1929, was handled by Moore's son. Hadley Williams, an avid golfer, also installed a nine-hole golf course, and the couple frequently golfed together.

Hadley Williams died in 1932. He was buried at the estate, near the entrance to the residence. Elsie died two years later and was buried at his side. In her will, she bequeathed the estate to the City of London, with the intent that it be used as a park, as well as an endowment of CA$1,100,000 (equivalent to $25,100,000 in 2025) for maintaining the property and purchasing art. This will was contested not only by Elsie's cousin, but also the City of London. Needing access to funds during the Great Depression, the city sought to break the will, arguing that the amount was excessive for its stated purpose. In 1938, after a decision by the Ontario Supreme Court, London was granted permission to access part of the endowment, which was used to build a new library as well as a new wing at Victoria Hospital.

The family's housekeeper, Harriet Corbett, continued to reside at the estate until her death in 1979. As per the terms of the will, only after Corbett's death was the city able to use the land. Initially considered a potential white elephant due to safety concerns, the estate was designated under the Ontario Heritage Act in 1985 by the City of London. This designation included the residence, the gatehouse, and the coach house. Later that year, after the coach house was deemed unsafe and beyond repair, it was removed from the listing and slated for demolition. In 1986, another designation was issued for the "upper lands", a stretch of wooded land with the estate that followed the south side of Windermere Road. The estate was opened to renters in 1985, being made available for meetings and wedding receptions.

The estate is operated by the Heritage London Foundation, which was established to preserve the house; in 2016, it was recognized with a London Heritage Award for its conservation efforts. The interior of the residence has been refurbished to better reflect its condition in 1917. For the centennial celebrations in 2017, this included retrieving porcelain and glassware from the attic as well as borrowing furniture from Museum London and the Eldon House. A book, Elsie's Estate: The Life, Love and Legacy of Elsie Perrin Williams, was published in commemoration of this anniversary. The estate remains used as an event venue, and was used in the filming of Very Merry Mystery (2025). The grounds are open to the public.

== Works cited ==
- Belanger, Joe (November 10, 2017). "Elsie Perrin Williams Estate Celebrates its Centennial with Events, Tours and Tea". The London Free Press – via ProQuest.
- Brown, Dan (February 11, 2016). "The Annual London Heritage Award Recognizes Excellence in Heritage Conservation". The London Free Press – via ProQuest.
- "By-law No. L.S.P.-2834-123". City of London. March 18, 1985. Archived from the original on May 27, 2026.
- "By-law No. L.S.P.-2834(a)312". City of London. July 2, 1985. Archived from the original on May 27, 2026.
- "By-law No. L.S.P.-2879-104". City of London. March 3, 1986. Archived from the original on May 27, 2026.
- Coulson, Sandra (May 20, 1985). "Historic Homes Furnish Business Location". Western Ontario Business. Vol. 10, no. 12 – via ProQuest.
- De Bono, Norman (December 2, 2025). "Made-in-London Holiday Movie Set to Air on HBO, Oprah Network". The London Free Press – via ProQuest.
- "Elsie Perrin Williams Estate". Canada's Historic Places. Parks Canada. Archived from the original on April 9, 2026.
- Johnston, Penelope (February 17, 1998). "The Life of London's Dr. Hadley Williams". Medical Post. Vol. 34, no. 7. p. 45. ProQuest 228839144 – via ProQuest.
- Peterson, Leith (2005). "Elsie Perrin Williams". In Baker, Michael; Bates Neary, Hilary (eds.). 100 Fascinating Londoners. James Lorimer & Company. pp. 53–54. ISBN 978-1-55028-882-7.
- Tausky, Nancy Z. (1993). Historical Sketches of London: From Site to City. Peterborough, Ontario: Broadview Press. ISBN 978-0-921149-49-1.
- Wallace, Janis (December 12, 2017). "Elsie's Estate Sheds More Light on Elsie Perrin Williams and Her Family's Landmark on Windermere Road". Londoner – via ProQuest.
- "Windermere". ACORN. Vol. 3, no. 1. Architectural Conservancy Ontario. 1984. pp. 8–10.
