= John Mackenzie Moore =

Canadian architect (1857–1930)

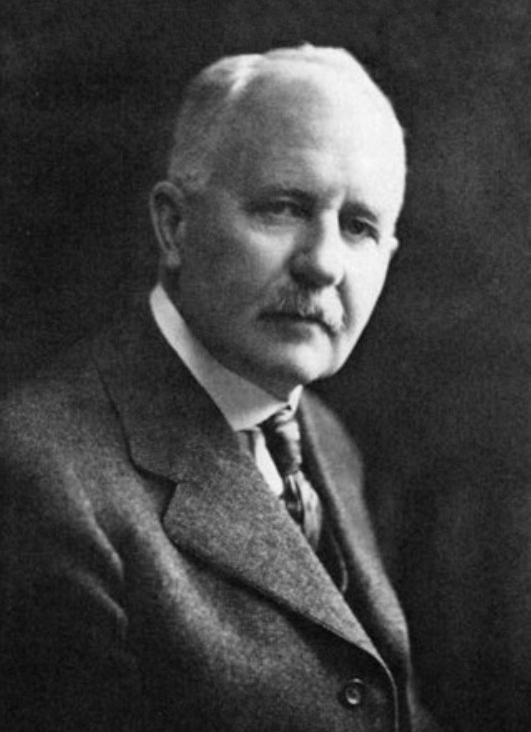
- Moore, circa 1925

Mayor of London, Ontario
- In office 1926–1927
- Preceded by: George Wenige
- Succeeded by: George Wenige

Personal details
- Born: October 1, 1857 London, Canada West
- Died: June 19, 1930 (aged 72) London, Ontario, Canada
- Occupation: Architect, politician

John Mackenzie Moore (October 1, 1857 – June 19, 1930) was a Canadian architect and politician who served as the mayor of London, Ontario, from 1926 to 1927. An apprentice of William Robinson and Thomas Henry Tracy, Moore worked as a hydraulic engineer and surveyor. He remained with their firm after George F. Durand took control, but left after a dispute over the terms of a gentlemen's agreement. In 1891, two years after Durand's death, Moore partnered with former staff member Fred Henry to continue the firm's operations. He remained its primary architect into the 1920s.

Moore designed numerous industrial buildings, houses, and other edifices, both independently and with his partners. As mayor of London, he oversaw the city's centennial celebration and commissioned a new municipal office. Several of his buildings have been designated heritage structures.

== Biography ==
=== Early life and career ===
Moore was born on October 1, 1857, in London, Canada West. He was the fifth of ten children born to William Moore, a distiller who was also a lieutenant colonel in the East Middlesex Militia, and his wife Margaret (née MacKenzie). Moore was educated in the city's public schools.

Moore apprenticed under William Robinson and Thomas Henry Tracy beginning in the 1870s, and remained with the firm after it was taken over by George F. Durand in 1882. By the 1880s, he had developed a reputation as a hydraulic engineer, working on the waterworks of Stratford and East London, and temporarily acting as city engineer in 1885 after Tracy left to fight in the North-West Rebellion.

By 1884, Moore was dissatisfied with his arrangement with Durand, seeking to leave the company. In response, Durand offered a gentlemen's agreement wherein the firm's surveying and engineering work would be entirely handled by Moore. The men ultimately disagreed over the specific terms of the agreement, and in 1888 Moore left Durand and Company and sued his former employer. The two remained in litigation until Durand's death in 1889. Afterwards, Moore continued to operate independently, as did Durand's former staff member Fred Henry. In 1891, the two signed articles of partnership, under which the firm would be known as Moore and Henry and Moore would receive a slightly larger percentage of profits. After gaining leadership of the firm, Moore avoided verbal agreements, instead defining specific terms with written contracts. Under Moore, the firm was mostly consistent in using quarter-inch scale, and increased emphasis was given to technical directions.

=== Moore and Company ===
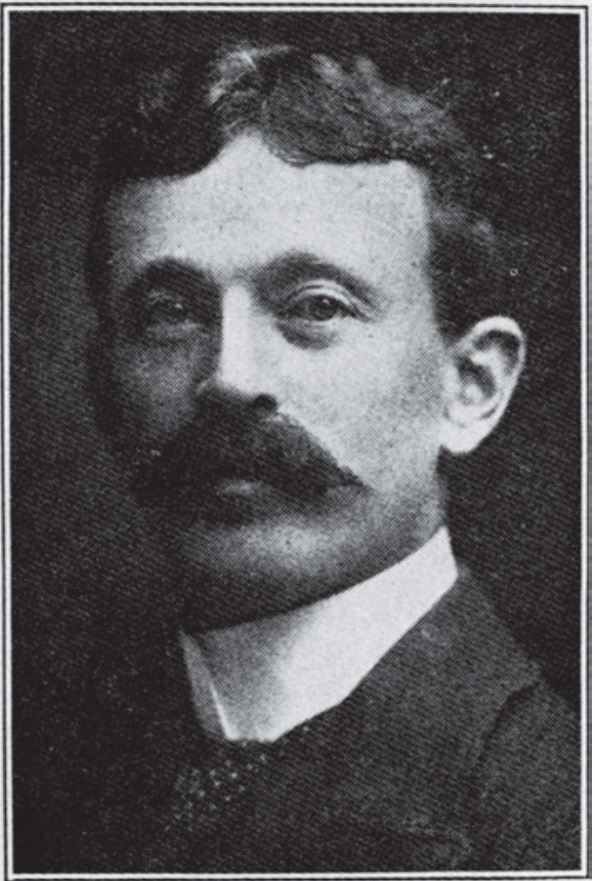
Fred Henry, Moore's partner between 1891 and 1908

Moore had married Louisa Mary McClary, the daughter of foundry owner Oliver McClary, on April 27, 1881. In 1888, after parts of the McClary Manufacturing Company were destroyed by fire, Moore's father-in-law hired him to rebuild; after little more than a month, new shops along King Street, London, were ready for occupancy. The McClary Manufacturing Company commissioned several further works from Moore, including a new plant in 1896; a storehouse in Vancouver, British Columbia, in 1897; and an addition to the offices in Winnipeg, Manitoba, in 1899.

In the 1890s, during a time when London saw rapid expansion, Moore and Company prepared several industrial designs, including several buildings for the London Street Railway Company as well as a power station for the Canadian General Electric Company (1893), an exchange for the Bell Telephone Company (1898), and a boiler house for the London Electric Company (1899). The firm also took several contracts for churches, as well as a new YMCA building (1895) and renovations to the London Masonic Hall. While operating the architecture firm, Moore continued to hold public mandates. He became superintendent of London's waterworks in 1894, serving until 1910. He also served as public engineer for several of London's townships.

In 1908, Moore and Henry made John Vicar Munro a partner, with an ailing Henry remaining a partner in name only until the following year. Moore's partnership with Munro lasted until 1913, with the latter receiving a salary in lieu of a share of profits from 1912. At the time, the firm employed four full-time staff members, with additional employees hired as needed. In their survey of Victorian architecture in Southwestern Ontario, Nancy Z. Tausky and Lynne D. Distefano write that Moore appears to have focused primarily on everyday business management as well as his surveying and engineering interests, with the aesthetics of architecture entrusted to staff. He continued to use hollow-wall construction into the 1910s.

=== Politics ===
In 1916, Moore was elected as a controller in London. After two terms, from 1916 through 1917, in 1925 he received a petition with 1,500 signatures urging him to contest the mayoral election. Citing this petition, he challenged the popular incumbent mayor George Wenige, broadly pledging to "fight for the things of benefit to London and against those things which are not conducive to progress". He won the election, and during his term he commissioned new sewers and a dam while also reconfiguring the administration. He also oversaw centennial celebrations and authorized a new municipal office, though it was not completed until 1929. Moore won reelection in 1927, though he had to resign by the end of the year due to illness.

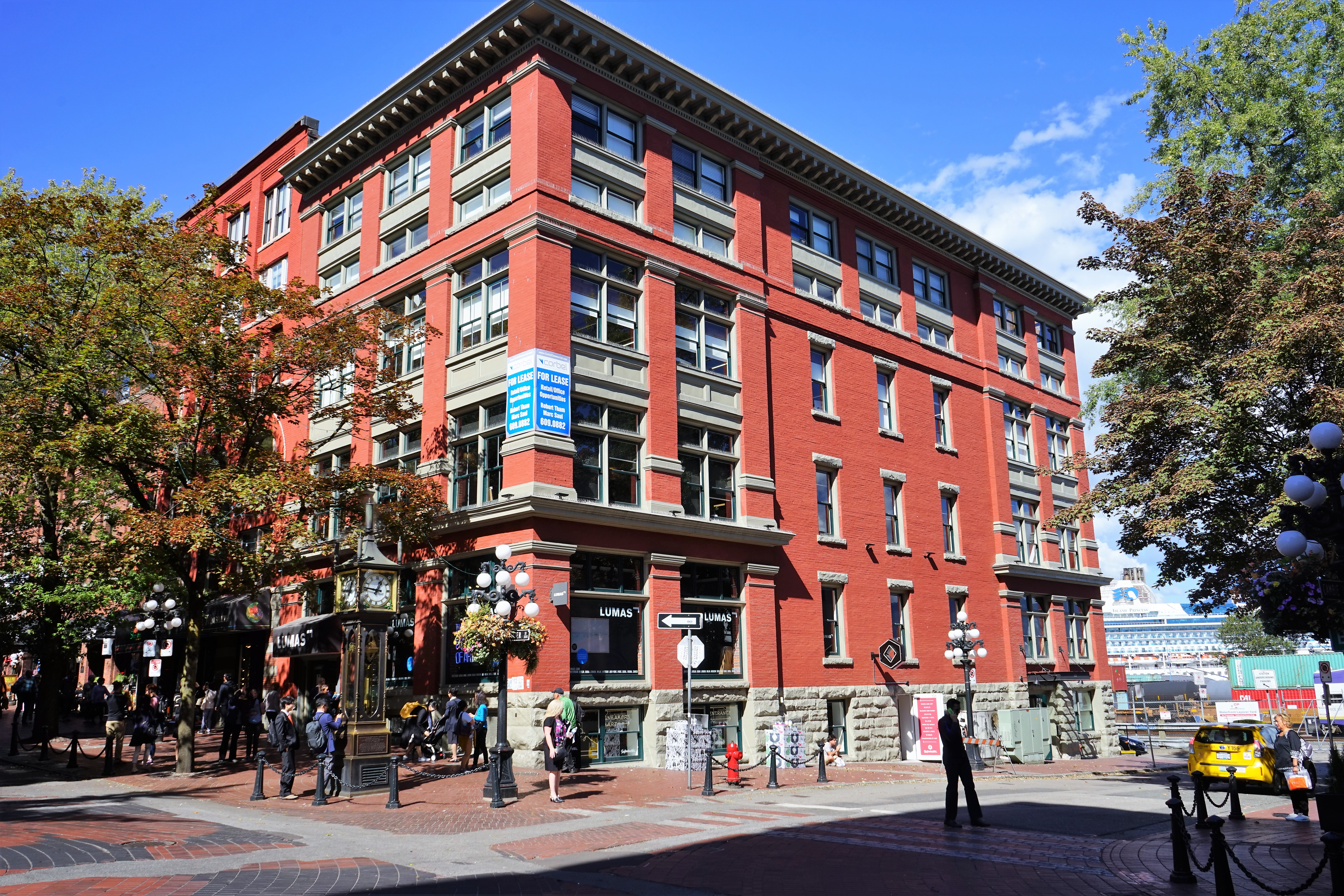
The McClary Manufacturing Company Building (1897) in Vancouver, one of the designated structures built by Moore

While involved in politics, Moore continued to run Moore and Company. The firm took several large commissions. Working with the Detroit, Michigan-based F. H. Spier, it completed four buildings for the University of Western Ontario between 1922 and 1924. It also completed Hotel London (1927), the London Life Company headquarters (1927), and a Bell Telephone Company exchange (1929), as well as a three-bedroom house for himself (1925). During the 1920s, he served as the president of the London and Port Stanley Railway, and was a member of numerous architectural and surveying organizations.

Moore died on June 19, 1930, at his London home. Obituaries highlighted his skill as an architect, as well as his effectiveness as mayor. One obituary wrote that he had known "exactly when to leave an official alone to do his work". It continued, "He knew what was to be done, and he never interfered unless he saw for himself that some other way of carrying out a project was a more efficient one."

== Legacy ==
Many of Moore's documents were donated to the University of Western Ontario by the architect Ronald E. Murphy in the late 1960s, at which time he led the firm initially established by William Robinson. Aside from hundreds of architectural drawings and business records, these included numerous books on architecture, as well as several journals from the United States and United Kingdom.

The McClary Building in the Gastown district of Vancouver, noted for its Classical Revival style, has been designated a heritage structure. The Elsie Perrin Williams Estate at 101 Windermere Road, residence designed by Moore, was designated by the City of London under the Ontario Heritage Act in 1985.

== Selected works ==
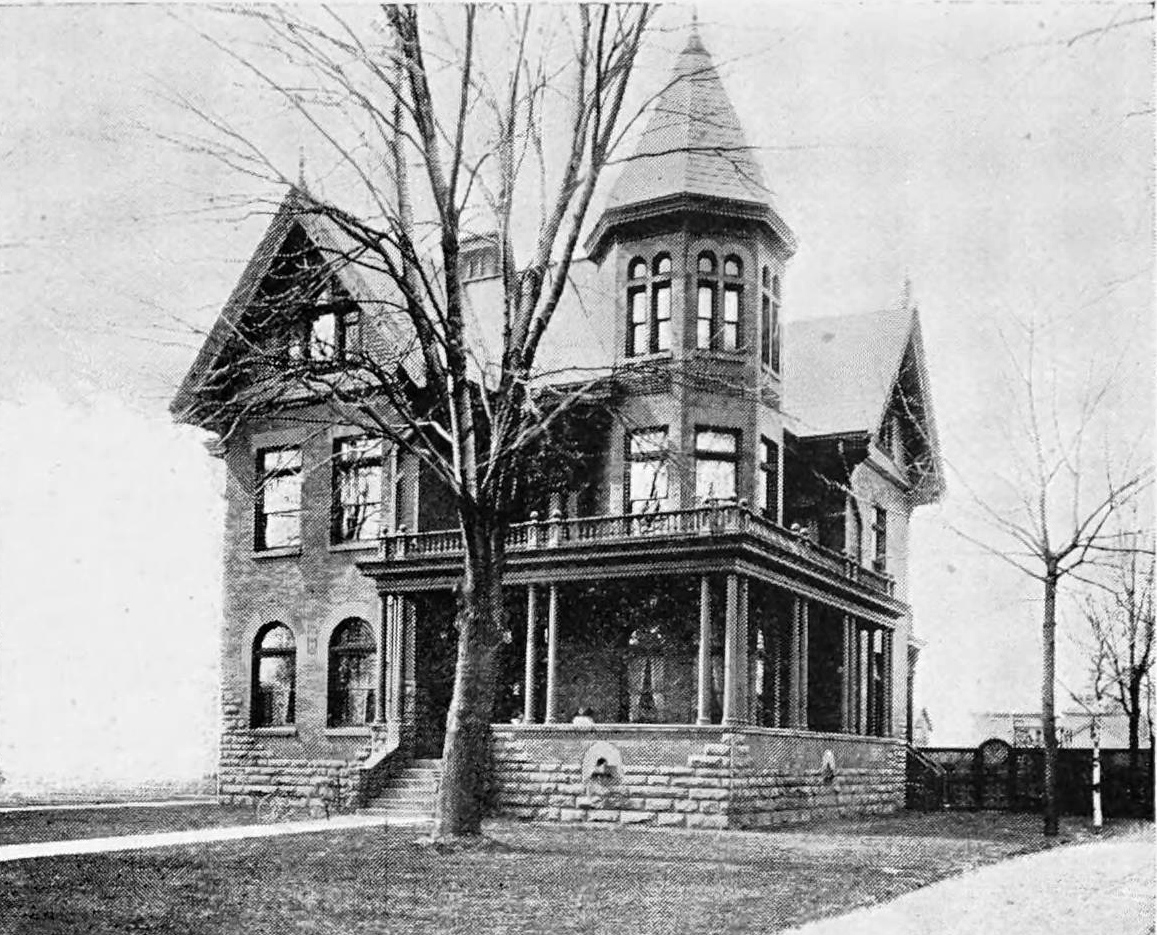
Charles W. Leonard House (1893)

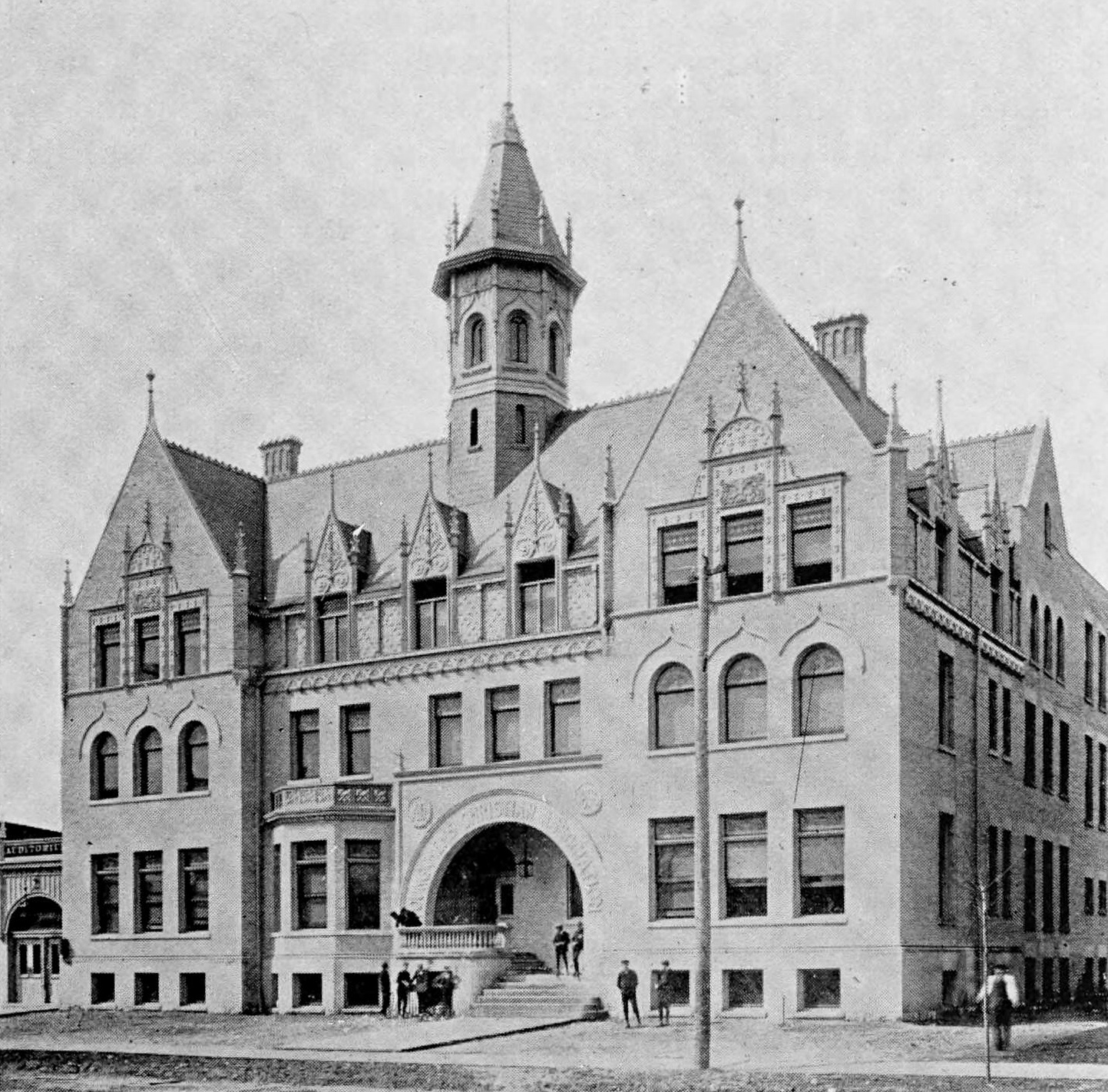
YMCA London (1895–1897, with Henry, destroyed by fire)

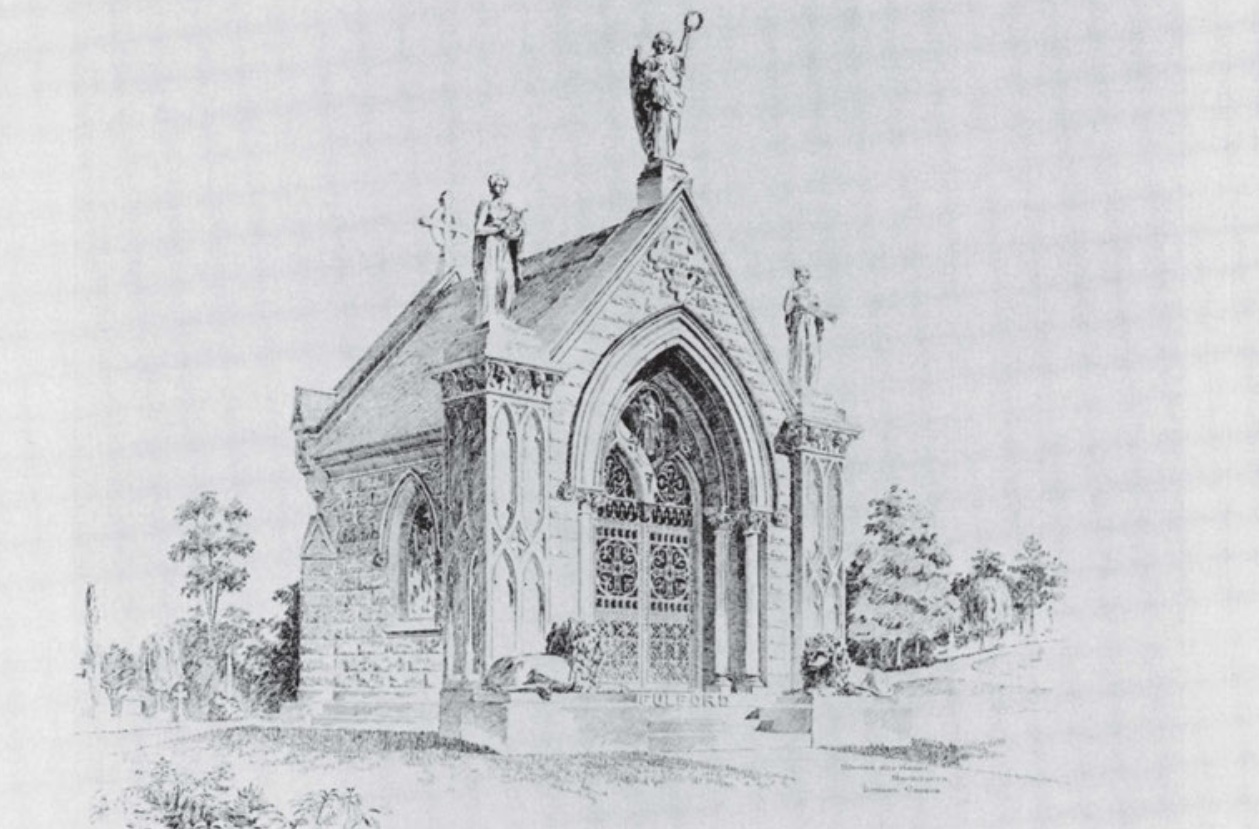
Mausoleum for Annie Pixley (1897)

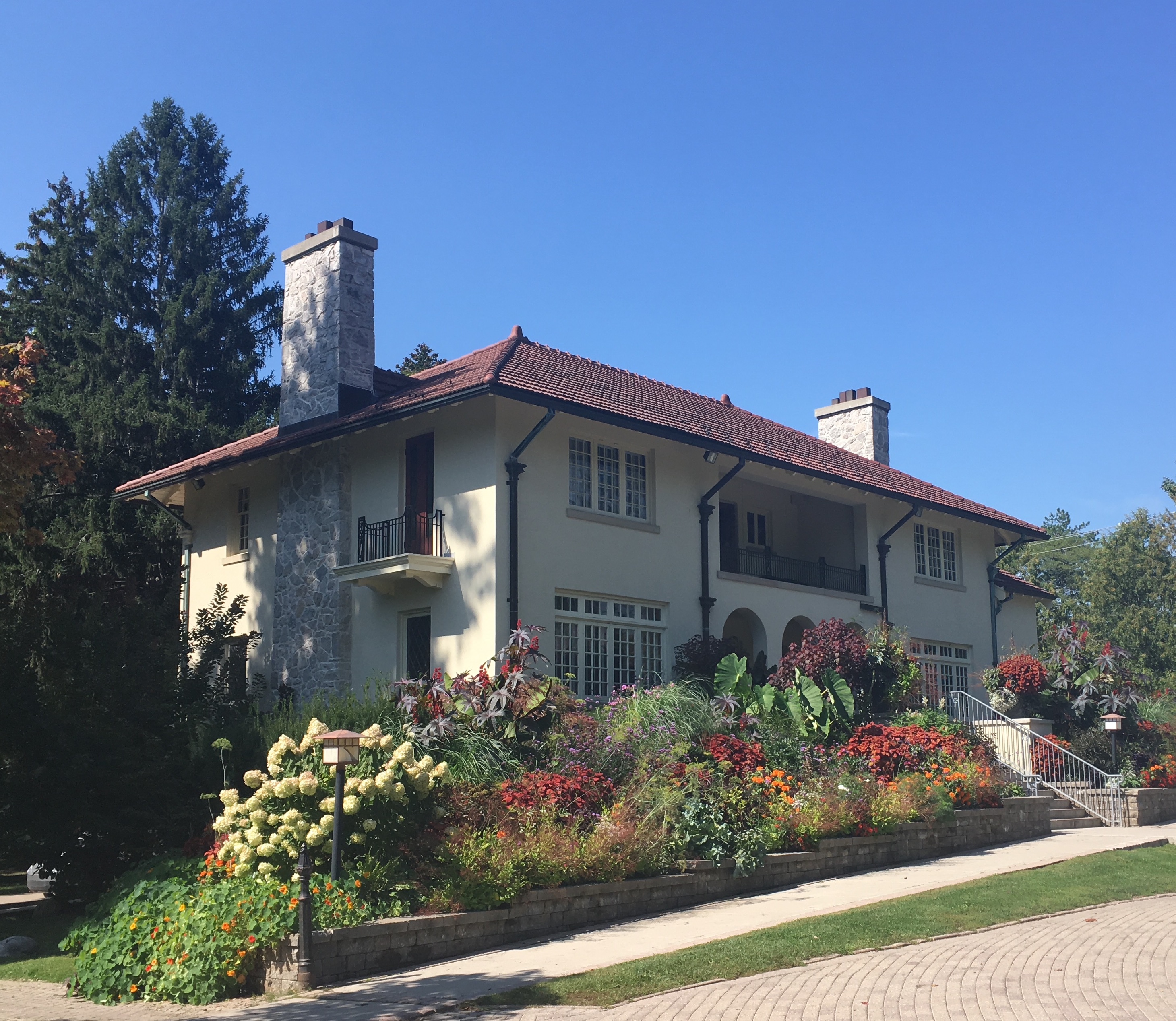
Elsie Perrin Williams Estate, residence (1916)

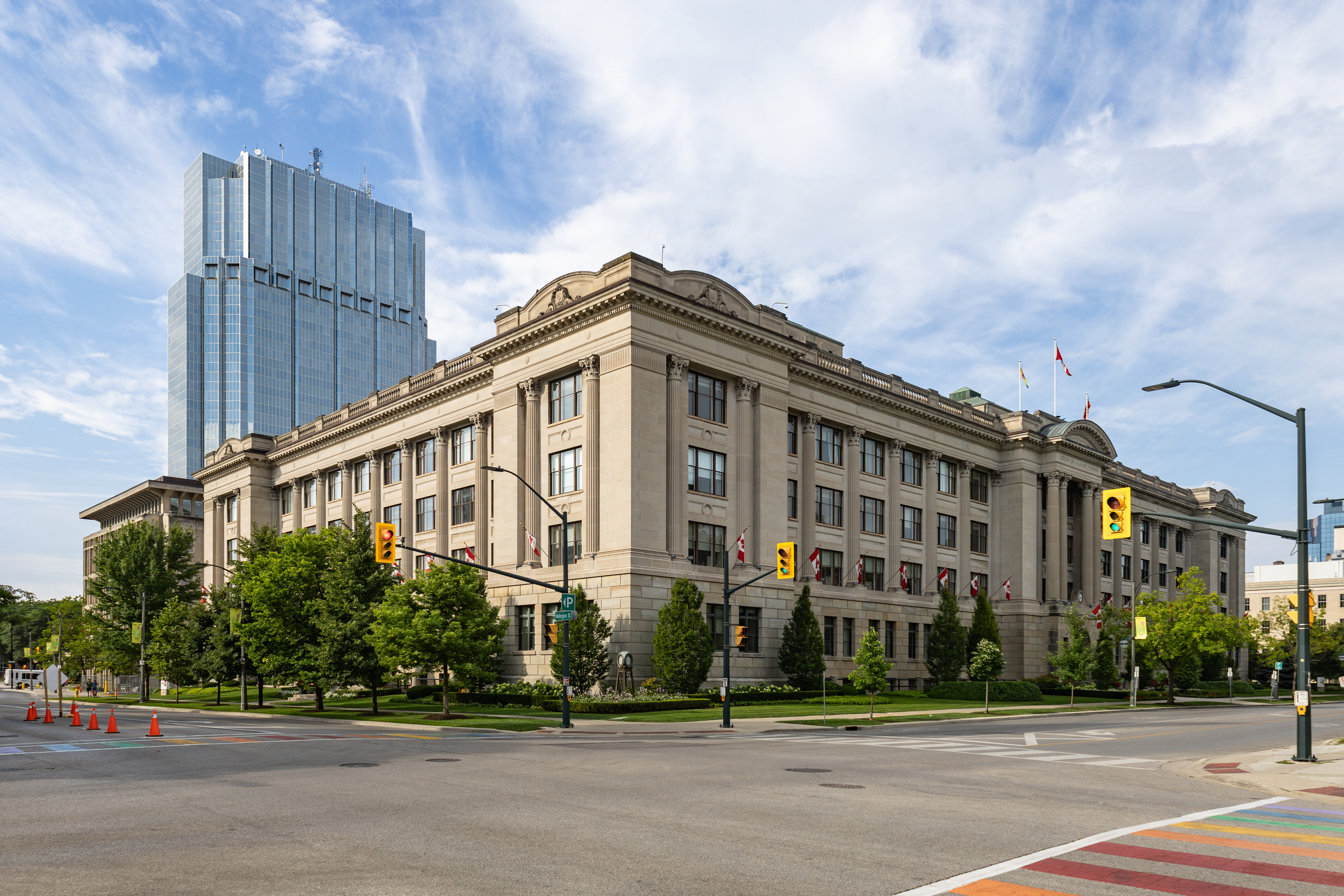
London Life Building (1926–1927)

== Works cited ==
- Cartier, Art (2000). Politics & Other Games and Notes. Vol. 3. London, Ontario: Arthur D. Cartier. ISBN 978-0-9687866-0-4.
- "Elsie Perrin Williams Estate". Canada's Historic Places. Parks Canada. Archived from the original on April 9, 2026.
- Greene, B. M., ed. (1927). Who's Who in Canada. Vol. 19. Toronto: International Press Limited.
- Reunion London 1988: Heritage and Horizons. London, Ontario: City of London. 1988. ISBN 978-0-920298-67-1.
- Tausky, Nancy Z.; Distefano, Lynne D. (2018). Victorian Architecture in London and Southwestern Ontario: Symbols of Aspiration. Toronto: University of Toronto Press. doi:10.3138/j.ctvfrxbbj. ISBN 978-1-4875-8257-9. OCLC 1121054163.
- Luxton, Donald, ed. (2003). Building the West: The Early Architects of British Columbia. Vancouver: Talonbooks. ISBN 978-0-88922-474-2.
