= Barrie Jail =

Prison in Ontario, Canada from 1842–2001

Barrie Gaol
- Interactive map of Barrie Gaol
- Location: Barrie, Ontario, Canada; 44.3924°N 79.6847°W
- Status: Closed
- Security class: Maximum
- Opened: 1842
- Closed: 2001
- Managed by: Ministry of Community Safety and Correctional Services

The Barrie Gaol, colloquially referred to as the Barrie Bucket, located at 87 Mulcaster Street in Barrie, Ontario, Canada, was a maximum-security facility housing offenders awaiting trial, sentencing or transfer to federal and provincial correctional facilities, opened in 1841 and closed in 2001. It was replaced by the Central North Correctional Centre in the town of Penetanguishene, about 47 km northwest of Barrie.

The jail was designed by Toronto architect Thomas Young, who subscribed to the contemporary theory that a polygonal structure would make the occupants feel less confined. Construction of the jail began in 1840. It is built from limestone from the quarry at Longford on the east side of Lake Couchiching.

Five prisoners were hanged at this location: James Carruthers, aged 48 on June 11, 1873, for the murder of his wife; John Tryon, age 47 on December 30, 1873, for the murder of Francis Fisher; George O'Neil, age 47 on January 4, 1929, for the murders of Azor Robertson and Ruby Irene Martin; Thomas Wesley Campbell, age 54, on January 4, 1932, for the murder of his father William Campbell; and Lloyd Wellington Simcoe, age 18 in 1945, for murder. Others died during incarceration and are believed to be buried in the inner courtyard. Simcoe, who was 17 days shy of his 18th birthday at the time of his arrest, was the last juvenile offender to be executed in Canada.

The last inmate to reside at the Barrie Gaol was transferred to the Penetanguishene 'superjail' on December 7, 2001. It remains vacant to this day.

The jail served as the primary filming location for the movie Dark Reprieve (2008).

== See also ==
- List of correctional facilities in Ontario
