= Eliot Wigginton =

American oral historian and folklorist (born 1942)

Eliot Wigginton (born Brooks Eliot Wigginton on November 9, 1942) is an American oral historian, folklorist, writer and former educator. He is most widely known for developing with his high school students the Foxfire Project, a writing project consisting of interviews and stories about Appalachia. The project was developed into a magazine and series of best-selling Foxfire books. The series comprised essays and articles by high school students from Rabun County, Georgia focusing on Appalachian culture. In 1987, Wigginton was named "Georgia Teacher of the Year," and in 1989, he was awarded a MacArthur Fellowship.

In 1992, Wigginton confessed to and was convicted of child molestation.

== Early life ==
Brooks Eliot Wigginton was born in West Virginia on November 9, 1942. His mother, Lucy Freelove Smith Wigginton, died eleven days later of "pneumonia due to acute pulmonary edema," according to her death certificate. His father, Brooks Edward Wigginton, was a professor of Landscape Architecture in Athens, Georgia.

In 1964, Wigginton earned a bachelor's degree in English from Cornell University, and then earned a Master of Arts in Teaching (MAT) degree in English from Cornell. In 1966, he began teaching English in the Rabun Gap-Nacoochee School, located in the Appalachian Mountains of northeastern Georgia.

Uncertain whether he wanted to continue teaching high school, Wigginton took a leave of absence to pursue a second master's degree. He earned a master's of English from Johns Hopkins University in 1968.

== Foxfire ==
In 1966, Wigginton began a writing project with his students at Rabun Gap‐Nacooche High School, who began to compile written oral histories from local residents based on recorded interviews. In 1967, they started publishing the interviews, along with original articles and other student writing, in a quarterly magazine called Foxfire, named after local phosphorescent lichen. Topics included folklife practices, recipes, customs associated with farming, and the rural life of southern Appalachia, as well as the folklore and oral histories of local residents.

In 1972, an anthology of collected Foxfire articles was published as The Foxfire Book (Anchor Press, 1972). The Foxfire Book achieved New York Times best-seller status, selling 298,756 copies by February 1973. By 1975, Foxfire magazine had about 10,000 subscribers, and had earned $250,000 in royalties from sales of Foxfire and Foxfire 2. In 1976, Foxfire 3 appeared on the New York Times Best Sellers list in the Trade Paperbacks section for 5 weeks. In total, the school published twelve volumes. Special collections were also published, including The Foxfire Book of Appalachian Cookery, Foxfire: 25 Years, A Foxfire Christmas, and The Foxfire Book of Appalachian Toys and Games. Several collections of recorded music from the local area were also released. Wigginton transferred the Foxfire project to Rabun County High School in 1977.

=== Foxfire In popular culture ===
- In 1982, Hume Cronyn and Susan Cooper developed Foxfire, a play inspired by Foxfire magazine. It was staged at the Ethel Barrymore Theater on Broadway in New York City. In 1983, Jessica Tandy won a Tony Award for Best Performance by an Actress in a Leading Role in a Play for her performance as Annie Nations, a Southern Appalachian widow based on the popular Aunt Arie, who appeared in several Foxfire books, including Aunt Arie: A Foxfire Portrait.
- In 1987, the play was adapted into a TV movie by the same name, which received one Golden Globe nomination, and seven nominations for the 1988 Primetime Emmy awards. Jessica Tandy reprised her role as Annie Nations, winning the Emmy Award for Outstanding Lead Actress in a Miniseries or a Special. Jan Scott and Eric Rogalla also won Emmy Awards for Outstanding Art Direction.

== Other work ==
Wigginton had an interest in activists working for social change in association with the Highlander Folk School. After a decade of collecting oral histories of people struggling for social justice in the South, Wigginton edited and published, Refuse to Stand Silently By: An Oral History of Grass Roots Social Activism in America, 1921-1964 (Doubleday, 1991).

In 2014, Wigginton contributed an oral history interview for a documentary on Mary Crovatt Hambidge, founder of the Hambidge Center for the Arts & Sciences, describing his childhood memories of Hambidge and her weaving operations at the Rabun County property where he also briefly lived in the late 1960s.

== Child molestation ==
On September 15, 1992, Wigginton was indicted for child molestation. The state charged that Wigginton had sexually fondled a 10-year-old boy during an overnight stay at the Foxfire grounds. Wigginton at first claimed to be innocent; however, local prosecutors announced their intent to release testimony from over 20 people claiming that Wigginton had molested them as children between 1969 and 1982. On November 13, 1992, Wigginton pleaded guilty to one count of non-aggravated child molestation. He received a one-year jail sentence, which he served at the Rabun County Jail, and 19 years of probation. Bill Parrish, then-executive director of Foxfire Fund, announced that the guilty plea would require Wigginton's "total separation" from the organization. After being permanently removed from the Foxfire Project, Wigginton moved to Florida, where he is registered as a sex offender.

== Foxfire after Wigginton ==
After Wigginton's departure, the Foxfire project continued under the auspices of the Foxfire Fund and its educational model of the "Foxfire approach" to experiential education. The students and Fund developed a museum in Mountain City, Georgia, consisting of several cabins. In 1998, the University of Georgia anthropology department started to work with the Foxfire project to archive 30 years worth of materials. The collection is held at the museum and includes "2,000 hours of interviews on audio tape, 30,000 black and white pictures and hundreds of hours of videotape." By improving how the material is archived and establishing a database, the university believes the materials can be made more easily available for scholars. The Foxfire educational philosophy is based on the values of "a learner-centered, community-based expression." By 1998, educational theories from Foxfire were being used by teachers in 37 school systems in the US.

== Bibliography ==
- Wigginton, Eliot, ed., (1972). The Foxfire Book. Garden City, NY: Anchor Press / Doubleday.
- Wigginton, Eliot and his students, ed., (1973). Foxfire 2: Ghost Stories, Spring Wild Plant Foods, Spinning and Weaving, Midwifing, Burial Customs, Corn Shuckin's, Wagon Making and More Affairs of Plain Living. Garden City, NY: Anchor Press / Doubleday.
- Wigginton, Eliot and his students, ed., (1975). Foxfire 3: Animal Care, Banjos and Dulcimers, Hide Tanning, Summer and Fall Wild Plant Foods, Butter Churns, Ginseng, and Still More Affairs of Plain Living. Garden City, NY: Anchor Press / Doubleday. ISBN 0-385-02272-7
- Wigginton, Eliot, (1975). Moments: The Foxfire Experience. Kennebunk, ME: Star Press, Inc. ISBN 99938-1-828-3
- Wigginton, Eliot, ed., (1976). 'I Wish I could Give My Son a Wild Raccoon'. Garden City, NY: Anchor Press / Doubleday.
- Wigginton, Eliot and his students, ed., (1977). Foxfire 4: Water Systems, Fiddle Making, Logging, Gardening, Sassafras Tea, Wood Carving, and Further Affairs of Plain Living. New York: Anchor Books. ISBN 0-385-12087-7
- Wigginton, Eliot and his students, ed., (1979). Foxfire 5: Ironmaking, Blacksmithing, Flintlock Rifles, Bear Hunting, and Other Affairs of Plain Living. Garden City, NY: Anchor Press. ISBN 0-385-14307-9
- Wigginton, Eliot and his students, ed., (1980). Foxfire 6: Shoe Making, Gourd Banjos and Songbows, One Hundred Toys and Games, Wooden Locks, A Water-Powered Sawmill, and Other Affairs of Just Plain Living. Garden City, NY: Anchor Press. ISBN 0-385-15272-8
- Page, Linda Garland & Eliot Wigginton, eds., (1983) Aunt Arie: A Foxfire Portrait. New York: E. P. Dutton. ISBN 0-8078-4377-6
- Wigginton, Eliot, Margie Bennett, and their students, eds., (1984). Foxfire 8. Garden City, NY: Anchor Press / Doubleday. ISBN 0-385-17741-0
- Wigginton, Eliot, (1985). Sometimes a Shining Moment: The Foxfire Experience. Garden City, NY: Anchor Press / Doubleday. ISBN 0-385-13359-6
- Wigginton, Eliot, Margie Bennett, and their students, eds., (1986). Foxfire 9. Garden City, NY: Anchor Press / Doubleday. ISBN 0-385-17743-7
- Wigginton, Eliot, ed., (1990). A Foxfire Christmas. New York: Doubleday Books.
- Wigginton, Eliot, ed., (1991). Refuse to Stand Silently By: An Oral History of Grassroots Social Activism in America, 1921-1964. New York: Doubleday.
- Wigginton, Eliot, ed. (1991). Foxfire: 25 Years. Garden City, NY: Anchor Press / Doubleday. ISBN 0-385-13359-6
- Page, Linda Garland & Eliot Wigginton, eds., (1992) The Foxfire Book of Appalachian Cookery. Chapel Hill, NC: The University of North Carolina Press.

== Awards and honors ==
- 1986, Wigginton was named "Georgia Teacher of the Year".
- 1989, Wigginton was awarded a fellowship from the John D. and Catherine T. MacArthur Foundation.
