= Rabun County School District =

School district in Georgia (U.S. state)

Address
- 963 Tiger Connector Tiger, Georgia, 30576; United States
- Coordinates: 34.845110°N 83.431450°W

District information
- Grades: Pre-Kindergarten – 12
- Superintendent: April Childers
- Accreditation(s): Southern Association of Colleges and Schools; Georgia Accrediting Commission

Students and staff
- Enrollment: 2,270 (2022–23)
- Faculty: 175.60 (FTE)

Other information
- Telephone: (706) 212-4350
- Fax: (706) 782-6224
- Website: rabuncountyschools.org

The Rabun County School District is a public school district in Rabun County, Georgia, United States, based in Tiger.

Its boundaries are those of the county. It serves the communities of Clayton, Dillard, Mountain City, Pine Mountain, Sky Valley, Tallulah Falls, and Tiger.

== Schools ==
The Rabun County School District has two elementary schools, one middle school, and one high school.

=== Elementary schools ===
- Rabun County Elementary School
- Rabun County Primary School

=== Middle school ===
- Rabun County Middle School

=== High school ===
- Rabun County High School - the Foxfire series of books and magazines which chronicle Appalachian traditions and culture is produced by students at Rabun County High School.
