= Arie Carpenter =

- Known for: Providing oral history and inspiration for Foxfire

Arie Carpenter (1885-1978) was a resident of Macon County, North Carolina, in the Southern Appalachian Mountains, United States. She was interviewed for the Foxfire Book published in 1972, through which she became known to thousands of readers. High school students interviewed her and reproduced her stories and skills of living in the Foxfire oral history-based books.

Carpenter was the inspiration for the character Annie Nations in the Foxfire play, a role performed on Broadway by Jessica Tandy, which also became a TV movie in 1987.
