= Clayton, Georgia =

- City
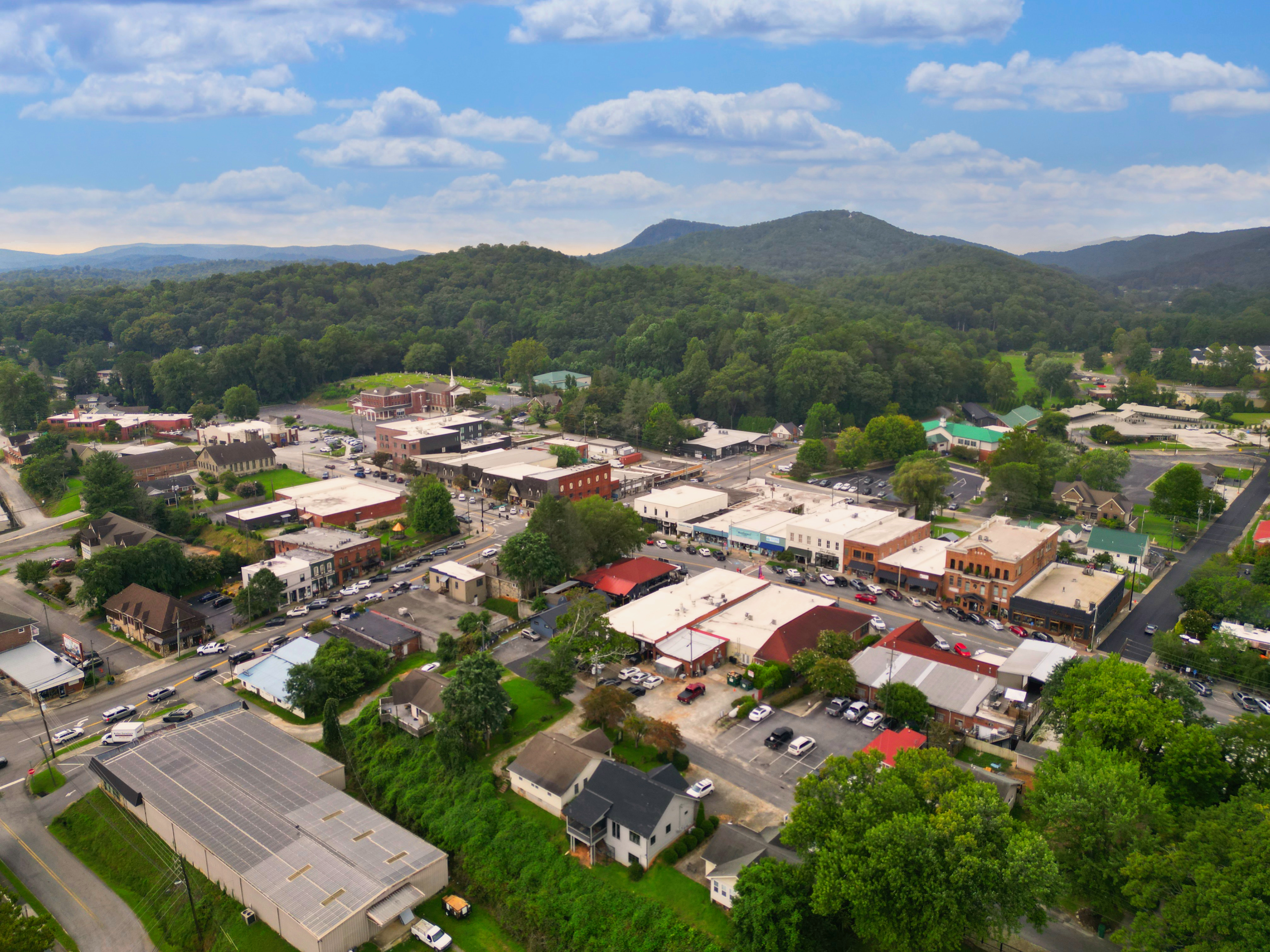
- Aerial of downtown Clayton

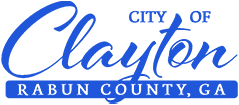
- Logo

- Location in Rabun County and the state of Georgia
- Coordinates: 34°52′39″N 83°24′10″W
- Country: United States
- State: Georgia
- County: Rabun

Government
  - Mayor: Kurt Cannon

Area
  - Total: 3.39 sq mi (8.78 km^{2})
  - Land: 3.39 sq mi (8.77 km^{2})
  - Water: 0.0039 sq mi (0.01 km^{2})
- Elevation: 1,926 ft (587 m)

Population (2020)
  - Total: 2,003
  - Density: 591/sq mi (228.3/km^{2})
- Time zone: UTC-5 (Eastern (EST))
  - Summer (DST): UTC-4 (EDT)
- ZIP code: 30525
- Area code: 706
- FIPS code: 13-16656
- GNIS feature ID: 2404066
- Website: cityofclaytonga.gov

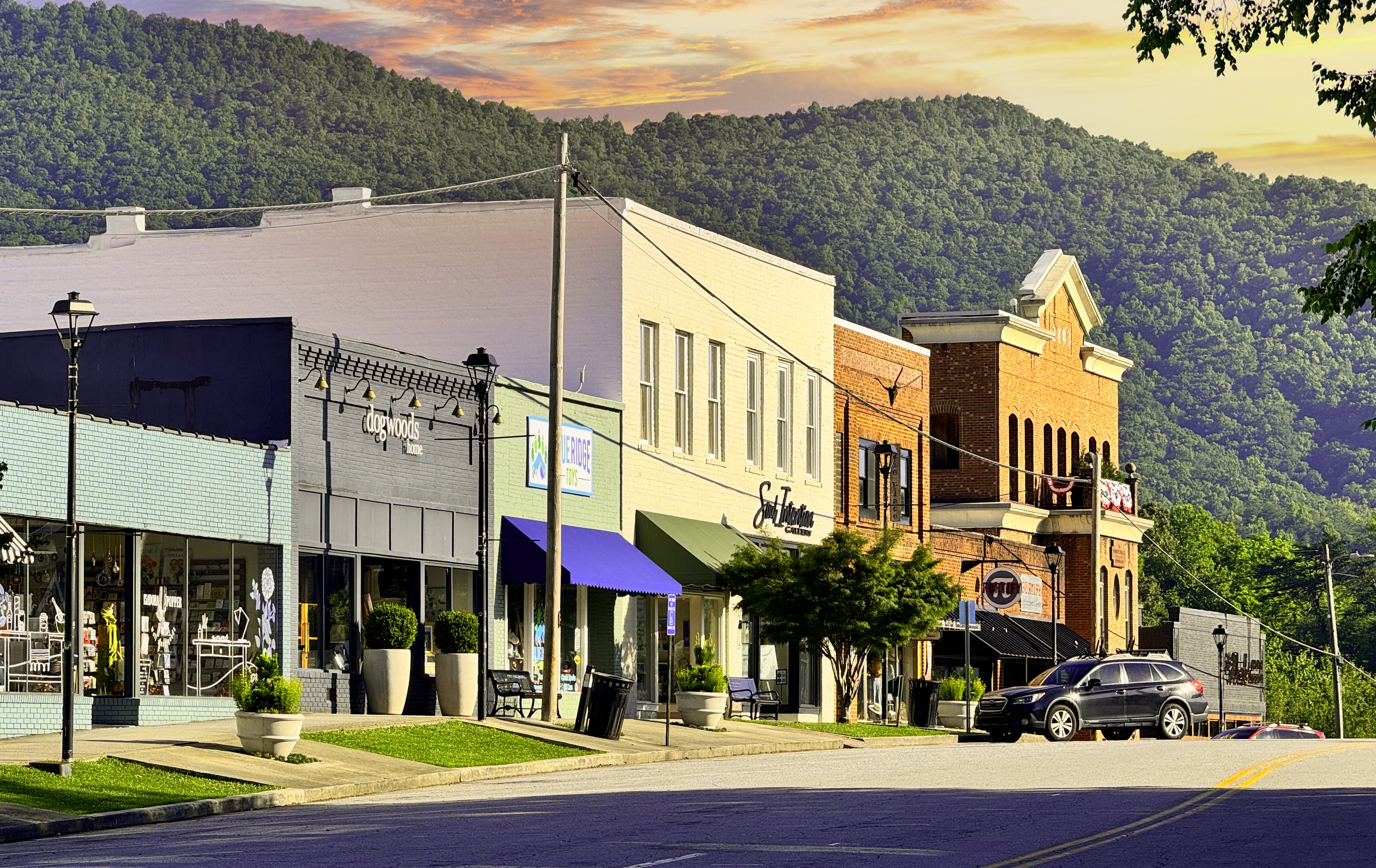
Main Street in downtown Clayton

Clayton is a city in Rabun County, in the far northeast of Georgia, United States. Its population was 2,003 at the 2020 census. The county seat of Rabun County, it is in the Blue Ridge Mountains.

== History ==
The area that eventually became Clayton was called the Dividings because it sat at the intersection of three crucial Cherokee trails. Explorer and naturalist William Bartram came through the Dividings in May 1775 while exploring what was later organized as Rabun County. Much later, after Clayton had grown to include the Dividings, two of the old Cherokee trails were improved as the main roads for Clayton and the county: U.S. 23/441 and U.S. 76.

Claytonsville was founded by European-American settlers in 1821 as the seat of Rabun County. In 1823, the town was incorporated and renamed Clayton. It was named after a prominent jurist and congressman, Judge Augustin S. Clayton, who served in both the Georgia House of Representatives and Georgia Senate before being elected as a Representative from Georgia, serving two terms from 1831 to 1835.

In 1824, 67 acres (270,000 m^{2}) were purchased from Solomon Beck for $150, and city representatives laid out a site for a courthouse and the surrounding streets.

In 1904, a significant development took place with the completion of the Tallulah Falls Railway to Clayton from Cornelia, Georgia. This railway was extended to Franklin, North Carolina, by 1907, marking a significant step in Clayton's transportation infrastructure. The town has been equipped with public water and sanitary sewer service since the 1920s. Initially, the water supply was sourced from two springs on nearby Buzzard Roost Mountain; today, it utilizes Lake Rabun as its water supply.

In 1936, Clayton recorded 30.0 inches (760 mm) of snowfall, the highest annual total for anywhere in Georgia.

In 1956, Walt Disney came to Clayton to film The Great Locomotive Chase. Part of Disney's Old Yeller was shot in Clayton in 1957. Grizzly was filmed in Clayton, with many residents cast in supporting roles. Production began the week before Thanksgiving 1975, with shooting continuing for about six weeks. After release in May 1976, Grizzly became the most financially successful independent motion picture to date—a record it held for more than two years until John Carpenter's Halloween hit theaters in October 1978.

Much of William Gibson's 2014 novel The Peripheral is set in Clayton in the not-too-distant future. Over the years, many films have been made in the Clayton and Tallulah Falls area.

== Geography ==
Clayton is at the southern base of 3,640-foot Black Rock Mountain. Immediately to its east is 3,000-foot Screamer Mountain. Other Blue Ridge Mountain peaks between 2,500 and 3,500 feet surround the city.

According to the United States Census Bureau, Clayton has a total area of 3.1 square miles (8.0 km^{2}), all of it land. Its downtown is at 1,925 feet (587 m), and a number of hilltops in the city limits exceed 2,200 feet.

=== Climate ===
Climate data for Clayton, Georgia (1991–2020 normals, extremes 1893–present)
| Month | Jan | Feb | Mar | Apr | May | Jun | Jul | Aug | Sep | Oct | Nov | Dec | Year |
|---|---|---|---|---|---|---|---|---|---|---|---|---|---|
| Record high °F (°C) | 79 (26) | 82 (28) | 89 (32) | 91 (33) | 94 (34) | 99 (37) | 102 (39) | 99 (37) | 98 (37) | 92 (33) | 82 (28) | 79 (26) | 102 (39) |
| Mean maximum °F (°C) | 66.9 (19.4) | 70.3 (21.3) | 77.7 (25.4) | 82.9 (28.3) | 86.0 (30.0) | 89.9 (32.2) | 91.2 (32.9) | 90.9 (32.7) | 88.0 (31.1) | 81.8 (27.7) | 75.3 (24.1) | 68.3 (20.2) | 92.6 (33.7) |
| Mean daily maximum °F (°C) | 50.2 (10.1) | 54.0 (12.2) | 61.0 (16.1) | 69.7 (20.9) | 76.4 (24.7) | 82.5 (28.1) | 85.4 (29.7) | 84.3 (29.1) | 79.3 (26.3) | 70.6 (21.4) | 60.8 (16.0) | 52.9 (11.6) | 68.9 (20.5) |
| Daily mean °F (°C) | 40.0 (4.4) | 42.7 (5.9) | 49.0 (9.4) | 57.0 (13.9) | 64.8 (18.2) | 72.0 (22.2) | 75.1 (23.9) | 74.3 (23.5) | 69.0 (20.6) | 58.8 (14.9) | 48.8 (9.3) | 42.4 (5.8) | 57.8 (14.3) |
| Mean daily minimum °F (°C) | 29.7 (−1.3) | 31.5 (−0.3) | 37.0 (2.8) | 44.4 (6.9) | 53.2 (11.8) | 61.5 (16.4) | 64.9 (18.3) | 64.2 (17.9) | 58.6 (14.8) | 47.0 (8.3) | 36.7 (2.6) | 31.8 (−0.1) | 46.7 (8.2) |
| Mean minimum °F (°C) | 11.7 (−11.3) | 16.0 (−8.9) | 20.4 (−6.4) | 28.2 (−2.1) | 37.1 (2.8) | 50.6 (10.3) | 56.4 (13.6) | 55.9 (13.3) | 44.4 (6.9) | 30.7 (−0.7) | 21.9 (−5.6) | 17.2 (−8.2) | 9.0 (−12.8) |
| Record low °F (°C) | −11 (−24) | −4 (−20) | 3 (−16) | 12 (−11) | 26 (−3) | 36 (2) | 45 (7) | 40 (4) | 27 (−3) | 18 (−8) | 5 (−15) | −4 (−20) | −11 (−24) |
| Average precipitation inches (mm) | 6.76 (172) | 5.76 (146) | 6.28 (160) | 5.71 (145) | 5.08 (129) | 6.27 (159) | 5.34 (136) | 6.43 (163) | 5.74 (146) | 5.35 (136) | 5.97 (152) | 7.04 (179) | 71.73 (1,822) |
| Average snowfall inches (cm) | 0.9 (2.3) | 0.6 (1.5) | 0.1 (0.25) | 0.0 (0.0) | 0.0 (0.0) | 0.0 (0.0) | 0.0 (0.0) | 0.0 (0.0) | 0.0 (0.0) | 0.0 (0.0) | 0.0 (0.0) | 0.8 (2.0) | 2.4 (6.1) |
| Average precipitation days (≥ 0.01 in) | 10.8 | 9.8 | 11.8 | 9.9 | 10.5 | 11.9 | 13.5 | 12.9 | 10.1 | 8.1 | 9.0 | 11.2 | 129.5 |
| Average snowy days (≥ 0.1 in) | 0.4 | 0.4 | 0.2 | 0.0 | 0.0 | 0.0 | 0.0 | 0.0 | 0.0 | 0.0 | 0.0 | 0.5 | 1.5 |
Source: NOAA

== Government ==
Clayton is governed by a mayor and a five-member city council.

As of 2025, the mayor is Mayor Pro Tem Stacy Fountain and the councilmembers are Tony Allen, Amanda Harrold, Sarah Gillespie and Althea Bleckley.

The City Manager is Trudy Crunkleton.

== Demographics ==
Historical population
| Census | Pop. | Note | %± |
|---|---|---|---|
| 1870 | 70 | | — |
| 1880 | 180 | | 157.1% |
| 1900 | 199 | | — |
| 1910 | 541 | | 171.9% |
| 1920 | 677 | | 25.1% |
| 1930 | 798 | | 17.9% |
| 1940 | 1,088 | | 36.3% |
| 1950 | 1,302 | | 19.7% |
| 1960 | 1,507 | | 15.7% |
| 1970 | 1,569 | | 4.1% |
| 1980 | 1,838 | | 17.1% |
| 1990 | 1,613 | | −12.2% |
| 2000 | 2,019 | | 25.2% |
| 2010 | 2,047 | | 1.4% |
| 2020 | 2,003 | | −2.1% |
U.S. Decennial Census

=== 2020 census ===
As of the 2020 census, Clayton had a population of 2,003. The median age was 43.0 years. 21.3% of residents were under the age of 18 and 24.6% of residents were 65 years of age or older. For every 100 females there were 88.1 males, and for every 100 females age 18 and over there were 84.0 males age 18 and over.

0.0% of residents lived in urban areas, while 100.0% lived in rural areas.

There were 889 households in Clayton, of which 26.0% had children under the age of 18 living in them. Of all households, 37.0% were married-couple households, 19.5% were households with a male householder and no spouse or partner present, and 36.2% were households with a female householder and no spouse or partner present. About 36.5% of all households were made up of individuals and 19.6% had someone living alone who was 65 years of age or older.

There were 1,115 housing units, of which 20.3% were vacant. The homeowner vacancy rate was 2.3% and the rental vacancy rate was 6.3%.

Racial composition as of the 2020 census
| Race | Number | Percent |
|---|---|---|
| White | 1,617 | 80.7% |
| Black or African American | 26 | 1.3% |
| American Indian and Alaska Native | 27 | 1.3% |
| Asian | 24 | 1.2% |
| Native Hawaiian and Other Pacific Islander | 1 | 0.0% |
| Some other race | 92 | 4.6% |
| Two or more races | 216 | 10.8% |
| Hispanic or Latino (of any race) | 327 | 16.3% |

=== 2010 census ===
As of the 2010 United States census, there were 2,047 people living in the city. The racial makeup of the city was 74.5% White, 1.4% Black, 0.5% Native American, 0.7% Asian, 0.3% from some other race and 1.9% from two or more races. 20.8% were Hispanic or Latino of any race.

=== 2000 census ===
As of the census of 2000, there were 2,019 people, 816 households, and 497 families living in the city. The population density was 653.2 inhabitants per square mile (252.2/km^{2}). There were 1,006 housing units at an average density of 325.5 per square mile (125.7/km^{2}). The racial makeup of the city was 84.55% White, 2.77% African American, 0.89% Native American, 1.34% Asian, 0.15% Pacific Islander, 9.41% from other races, and 0.89% from two or more races. Hispanic or Latino of any race were 14.71% of the population.

There were 816 households, out of which 22.7% had children under the age of 18 living with them, 44.7% were married couples living together, 11.2% had a female householder with no husband present, and 39.0% were non-families. 33.8% of all households were made up of individuals, and 18.1% had someone living alone who was 65 years of age or older. The average household size was 2.29 and the average family size was 2.79.

In the city, the population was spread out, with 19.2% under the age of 18, 9.4% from 18 to 24, 26.3% from 25 to 44, 21.7% from 45 to 64, and 23.4% who were 65 years of age or older. The median age was 40 years. For every 100 females, there were 99.1 males. For every 100 females age 18 and over, there were 93.0 males.

The median income for a household in the city was $26,600, and the median income for a family was $36,164. Males had a median income of $25,823 versus $18,304 for females. The per capita income for the city was $15,977. About 7.9% of families and 14.6% of the population were below the poverty line, including 14.3% of those under age 18 and 11.2% of those age 65 or over.

== Education ==
=== Rabun County School District ===
The Rabun County School District holds pre-school to grade twelve, and consists of two elementary schools, a middle school, and a high school. The district has 140 full-time teachers and over 2,221 students.

- Rabun County Elementary School
- Rabun County Primary School
- Rabun County Middle School
- Rabun County High School

=== Private education ===
Rabun Gap Nacoochee School

Tallulah Falls School

== Camps ==
The area around Clayton has long been the location for a number of camps for young people, mostly operated during the summertime.

- Camp Ramah Darom is located in the Persimmon Valley northwest of Clayton.
- Camp Rainey Mountain is located 4 miles (6 km) southeast of Clayton.
- Camp Blue Ridge

== Notable people ==
- Mike Ciochetti – stock car racer
- Celestia Susannah Parrish – educator, is buried here
- John H. Pitchford – lawyer admitted to the bar in Clayton, later moved to Indian Territory, where he became a justice on the Oklahoma Supreme Court in 1923
- Tom Powers – stock car racer
- Billy Redden – actor who played the young banjo player in the film Deliverance (1972)
- Nancy Schaefer – Georgia State Senator
- Lillian Smith (1897–1966) – author and civil rights activist
