= Charlie Woerner =

American football player (born 1997)

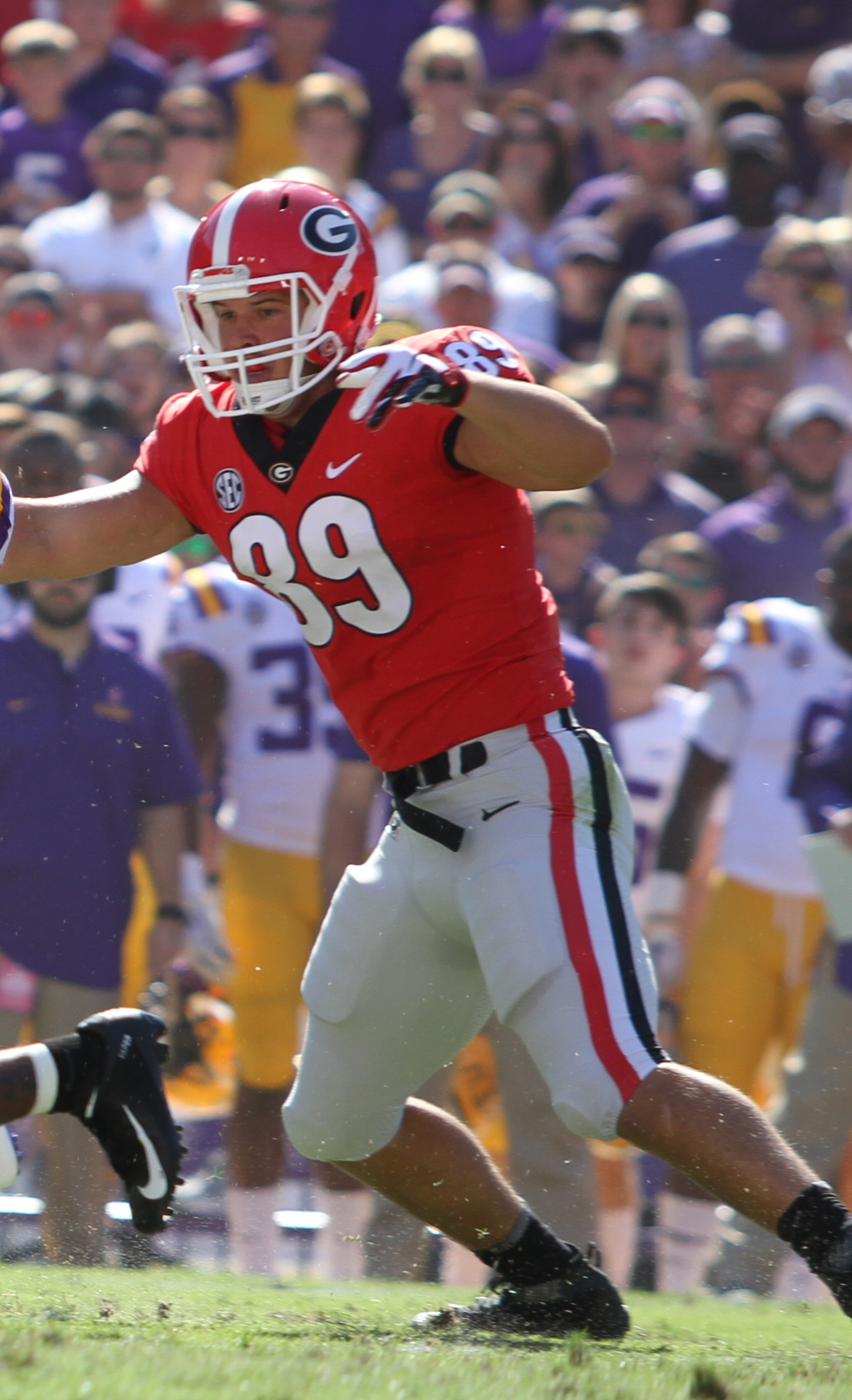
- Woerner with the Georgia Bulldogs in 2018

No. 89 – Atlanta Falcons
- Position: Tight end / Fullback
- Roster status: Active

Personal information
- Born: October 16, 1997 (age 29); Tiger, Georgia, U.S.
- Listed height: 6 ft 5 in (1.96 m)
- Listed weight: 250 lb (113 kg)

Career information
- High school: Rabun County (Tiger)
- College: Georgia (2016–2019)
- NFL draft: 2020: 6th round, 190th overall pick

Career history
- San Francisco 49ers (2020–2023); Atlanta Falcons (2024–present)

Career NFL statistics as of Week 9, 2026
- Receptions: 29
- Receiving yards: 237
- Receiving touchdowns: 1
- Rushing yards: 3
- Stats at Pro Football Reference

Charlie Kent Woerner (born October 16, 1997) is an American professional football tight end and fullback for the Atlanta Falcons of the National Football League (NFL). He played college football for the Georgia Bulldogs, and was selected by the San Francisco 49ers in the sixth round of the 2020 NFL draft.

== College career ==
After playing at Rabun County High School, Woerner played at Georgia, where he was held in high regard as one of the best blocking tight ends in the NCAA.

== Professional career ==
Pre-draft measurables
Height	Weight	Arm length	Hand span	Wingspan	40-yard dash	10-yard split	20-yard split	20-yard shuttle	Three-cone drill	Vertical jump	Broad jump	Bench press
6 ft 4 5/8 in (1.95 m)	244 lb (111 kg)	31 1/8 in (0.79 m)	10 in (0.25 m)	6 ft 4 7/8 in (1.95 m)	4.78 s	1.63 s	2.78 s	4.46 s	7.18 s	34.5 in (0.88 m)	10 ft 0 in (3.05 m)	21 reps
All values from NFL Combine

=== San Francisco 49ers ===
Woerner was selected by the San Francisco 49ers in the sixth round with the 190th overall pick in the 2020 NFL draft. The 49ers previously acquired this pick after trading wide receiver Marquise Goodwin to the Philadelphia Eagles. Woerner was placed on the reserve/COVID-19 list by the 49ers on December 19, 2020, and activated on December 29. He finished his rookie season with three catches for 36 yards on four targets in 14 games and emerged as a skilled blocking tight end in both pass blocking and run blocking.

In the 2021 season, he played all 17 games and finished with 5 catches for 52 yards on 6 targets while in 2022 he played in all 17 games and did not record any catches. He continued to be a skilled blocker for the 49ers in those two seasons, with a 75.4 run blocking grade and a 74.3 pass blocking grade from Pro Football Focus in 2021.

In the 2023 season, Woerner recorded 3 catches for 32 yards on 3 targets and played in all 17 games. He also notably finished the season with the third highest PFF run-blocking grade among tight ends for the 2024 season with a grade of 76.8.

=== Atlanta Falcons ===
On March 13, 2024, Woerner signed a three-year deal with the Atlanta Falcons. Woerner was signed along with former 49ers teammate Ross Dwelley who he had developed a friendship with during their tenures in San Francisco. To start the 2024 season, Woerner was named as the Falcons' backup tight end behind Kyle Pitts. Woerner finished the season with seven receptions for 46 yards across 16 games along with being the team's main blocking tight end - he played in 16 games with 5 starts. Like he had during his tenure with the 49ers, Woerner also played a major role on special teams and had four tackles in 2024. In the latter half of the year, Woerner saw an increase in playing time as then-Falcons' offensive coordinator and play caller Zac Robinson began using an increased number of multiple-tight end sets. Additionally, Robinson began having Woerner play from the backfield as a H-back and/or fullback - a new role for Woerner at the pro level as during his time with the 49ers, the team had long-tenured fullback Kyle Juszczyk.

Woerner's increased role from the latter part of the 2024 season carried over into the 2025 season. He was named as one of the Falcons' two starting tight ends alongside Kyle Pitts and during the season he significantly increased both his total number of offensive snaps and games started from 457 snaps played and five games started in 2024 to 565 snaps played and 13 games started in 2025. Woerner was again the team's main blocking tight end and their unofficial de facto fullback/H-Back, often acting as a lead run blocker from the backfield on run plays and pass protecting back on pass plays. Woerner recorded 8 receptions, 48 receiving yards, and 3 special teams tackles in the 2025 season.

In the 2026 season, Woerner again entered the season as one of the Falcons' two starting tight ends. In Week 9 against the Cincinnati Bengals, Woerner recorded his first career touchdown on a one-yard reception from Falcons quarterback Michael Penix Jr. at Santiago Bernabéu stadium in Madrid, Spain.

== NFL career statistics ==
Legend
**Bold**	Career high

=== Regular season ===
Year	Team	Games		Receiving					Tackles		
Year	Team	GP	GS	Rec	Yds	Avg	Lng	TD	Cmb	Solo	Ast
2020	SF	14	0	3	36	**12.0**	18	0	2	1	1
2021	SF	17	3	5	**52**	10.4	**27**	0	7	**6**	1
2022	SF	17	2	0	0	0.0	0	0	6	4	2
2023	SF	17	2	3	32	10.7	20	0	**10**	**6**	**4**
2024	ATL	16	5	7	46	6.6	13	0	4	2	2
2025	ATL	17	13	**8**	48	6.0	18	0	3	1	2
2026	ATL	10	6	3	23	7.7	13	1	3	0	3
Career		108	31	29	237	8.2	27	1	35	20	15

=== Postseason ===
Year	Team	Games		Receiving					Tackles		
Year	Team	GP	GS	Rec	Yds	Avg	Lng	TD	Cmb	Solo	Ast
2021	SF	3	1	0	0	0.0	0	0	0	0	0
2022	SF	3	0	0	0	0.0	0	0	**2**	**1**	**1**
2023	SF	3	0	0	0	0.0	0	0	**2**	**1**	**1**
Career		9	1	0	0	0.0	0	0	4	2	2

== Personal life ==
He is the nephew of former NFL safety Scott Woerner. Woerner won a state championship in discus during his senior year of high school. His father Kent Woerner played football at Furman University in Greenville, South Carolina.
