= Gunner Stockton =

American football player (born 2004)

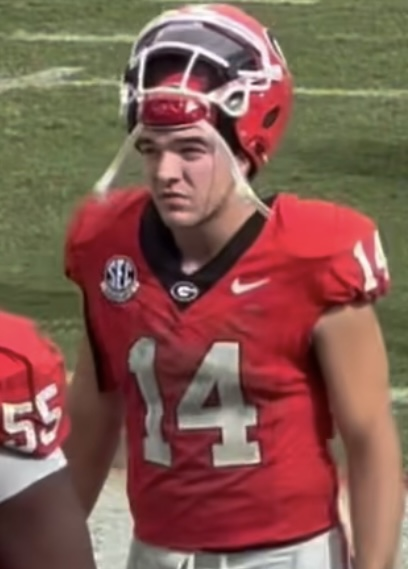
- Stockton in 2025

No. 14 – Georgia Bulldogs
- Position: Quarterback
- Class: Fifth year

Personal information
- Born: April 6, 2004 (age 22); Tiger, Georgia, U.S.
- Listed height: 6 ft 1 in (1.85 m)
- Listed weight: 215 lb (98 kg)

Career information
- High school: Rabun County (Tiger, Georgia)
- College: Georgia (2022–present)

Awards and highlights
- CFP national champion (2022); Third-team All-SEC (2025)
- Stats at ESPN

Gunner Duvall Stockton (born April 6, 2004) is an American college football quarterback for the Georgia Bulldogs.

== Early life ==
Stockton was born in Tiger, Georgia, to Rob and Sherrie Stockton, both former collegiate athletes. Rob played football at Georgia Southern and Sherri played basketball at Erskine College. He was named after one of his great-grandfathers, V. D. Stockton, a World War II veteran who served in a plane, earning the nickname Gunner. Stockton grew up in a family of Georgia Bulldogs fans. His grandfather Lawrence Stockton was a University of Georgia alumnus and ticket holder who was sprayed with firehoses and arrested after the 1986 edition of the Deep South's Oldest Rivalry for rushing No. 8 Auburn's field following a Georgia upset victory. Lawrence died of a heart attack in 2010 exiting EverBank Stadium after watching Georgia lose to Florida 34–31 in overtime in their annual rivalry game.

Stockton began playing quarterback for his youth football team at age six and was trained by George Bobo, the father of Georgia offensive coordinator Mike Bobo. He attended Rabun County High School and played baseball and football; he was a two-time baseball All-American but was best in football. As a freshman, Stockton earned the football team's starting quarterback job and led them to a region championship and state playoff quarterfinals appearance. That season, he threw for 2,917 yards and 34 touchdowns to only six interceptions while completing 65 percent of his passes, additionally running for 709 yards and 17 touchdowns with an average of 6.8 yards-per-carry. He was named the Football Player of the Year by newspaper Now Habersham for his performance.

Stockton became highly recruited and was invited to the 2022 All-American Bowl after his freshman season, receiving offers from Alabama and Penn State. As a sophomore in 2019, he threw for 3,472 yards and 43 touchdowns while running for 1,179 yards and 16 scores. He became a five-star recruit for the Class of 2022 and was ranked the best dual-threat quarterback nationally 247Sports. Prior to the 2020 season, Stockton's junior year, he committed to play college football for the South Carolina Gamecocks over the Georgia Bulldogs. In 2020, he threw for 3,128 yards and 45 touchdowns and ran for 1,581 yards and a further 26 touchdowns, helping Rabun County reach the state playoff semifinals with a 12–2 record.

After South Carolina dismissed coaches Will Muschamp and Mike Bobo, Stockton flipped his commitment to Georgia. As a senior in 2021, he led them to the state playoff quarterfinals again with a 12–2 record while throwing for 4,134 yards, 55 touchdowns and only one interception, being named All-State for the fourth time in his career and being named the Gatorade Georgia Player of the Year. He set the state records in passing touchdowns, total passing and rushing touchdowns and combined passing and rushing yards. He totaled 13,562 passing yards and 177 passing touchdowns at Rabun County while also running for 4,372 yards and 77 touchdowns in his career.

== College career ==
Stockton enrolled early at Georgia in January 2022. He redshirted as a true freshman in 2022, completing one pass for nine yards in the annual G-Day intrasquad game. He was a member of their 2022 national championship team. In the 2023 G-Day game, he completed 13-of-22 pass attempts for 144 yards, no touchdown and an interception while running for one score. He battled Carson Beck and Brock Vandagriff for a starting role in the 2023 season, with Beck winning and Stockton being the third-string behind Vandagriff. He made his collegiate debut in a win over the UT Martin Skyhawks, completing three-of-five passes for 29 yards. Stockton saw further action in games against Ball State and UAB, ending the regular season with six completions on nine attempts for 52 yards with an interception. He also appeared in the team's 2023 Orange Bowl win over Florida State, throwing for 96 yards and two touchdowns.

Entering the 2024 season, Stockton was listed as the backup quarterback behind Beck. In the 2024 SEC Championship Game vs. Texas, Stockton replaced Beck after halftime, following an injury to Beck. He threw for 72 yards and an interception, as Georgia went on to win 22–19 in overtime. With Beck ruled out for the remainder of the season, Stockton was thrust into the starting role to begin the Bulldogs' College Football Playoff run, beginning in the 2025 Sugar Bowl against Notre Dame. In his first career start, he threw for 234 yards and a touchdown in a 23–10 loss, ending the Bulldogs' season.

Stockton hands the ball off to Nate Frazier

In the 2025 season opener against Marshall, Stockton threw for 190 yards and combined for four touchdowns in his first career victory as the starter, leading the Bulldogs to a 45–7 rout. Against No. 15 Tennessee in his first career start against an SEC opponent, he threw for 304 yards and two touchdowns, while also rushing for 38 yards and a touchdown, as Georgia defeated the Volunteers 44–41 in overtime. Against No. 5 Ole Miss, Stockton completed 26 of 31 passes for 289 yards and four touchdowns, while also rushing for 59 yards and a touchdown in a 43–35 victory. Against No. 10 Texas, he threw for 229 yards and combined for five total touchdowns, four passing and one rushing, leading the Bulldogs to a commanding 35–10 triumph. In the 2025 SEC Championship Game against Alabama, Stockton completed 20 passes for 156 yards and three touchdowns, leading Georgia to a 28–7 win and being named the game's MVP. Stockton finished the 2025 season with 2,894 passing yards, 24 touchdowns, and five interceptions, while rushing for 462 yards and 10 touchdowns. He was named to the third-team All-SEC team. Following the conclusion of the 2025 season, Stockton announced that he would return to Georgia for his final season of eligibility in 2026.

In Georgia's 2026 season opener against Tennessee State, Stockton completed 15 of 16 passes for 202 yards and three touchdowns in the Bulldogs' 63–3 victory. The following week against Western Kentucky, he threw a program record-tying five touchdown passes for 234 yards in a 70–20 rout. Against No. 10 Ole Miss on the road, Stockton threw for 186 yards and accounted for five touchdowns, including four passing and one rushing, as Georgia defeated the Rebels 42–7.

=== Statistics ===
Season	Team	Games			Passing								Rushing			
Season	Team	GP	GS	Record	Cmp	Att	Pct	Yds	Y/A	TD	Int	Rtg	Att	Yds	Avg	TD
2022	Georgia	Redshirted (redshirt)														
2023	Georgia	4	0	–	12	19	63.2	148	7.8	2	1	152.8	11	63	5.7	0
2024	Georgia	5	1	0–1	45	64	70.3	440	6.9	1	1	130.1	21	−13	−0.6	0
2025	Georgia	14	14	12−2	269	386	69.7	2,894	7.5	24	5	150.6	129	462	3.6	10
2026	Georgia	11	11	10–1	176	243	72.4	2,390	9.8	22	4	181.4	61	240	3.9	3
Career		34	26	22–4	502	712	70.5	5,872	8.2	49	11	159.4	222	752	3.4	13

== Personal life ==
In February 2026, Stockton appeared as a guest at an event featuring U.S. President Donald Trump in Rome, Georgia. Stockton's appearance with Trump drew criticism from some fans.
