= Foxfire (1987 film) =

1987 television film by Jud Taylor

- VHS cover art
- Based on: Foxfire by: Susan Cooper; Hume Cronyn
- Screenplay by: Susan Cooper
- Directed by: Jud Taylor
- Starring: Jessica Tandy; Hume Cronyn; John Denver
- Composer: Johnny Mandel
- Country of origin: United States
- Original language: English

Production
- Executive producer: Marian Rees
- Producer: Dorothea G. Petrie
- Cinematography: Thomas Burstyn
- Editor: Paul LaMastra
- Running time: 100 minutes
- Production companies: Hallmark Hall of Fame Productions; Marian Rees Associates

Original release
- Network: CBS
- Release: December 13, 1987

Foxfire is an American drama television film that premiered on CBS on December 13, 1987, as part of the Hallmark Hall of Fame anthology series. It is directed by Jud Taylor from a teleplay by Susan Cooper, based on the play of the same name by Cooper and Hume Cronyn. The film stars Jessica Tandy, Cronyn, and John Denver, with Tandy and Cronyn both reprising their roles from the 1982 Broadway production.

The film was honored with the Peabody Award and was nominated for a Golden Globe Award for Best Miniseries or Television Film. It won two Primetime Emmy Awards, for Outstanding Lead Actress for Tandy and Outstanding Art Direction, from a total of eight nominations (including Outstanding Drama/Comedy Special).

== Synopsis ==
John Denver plays the country singer son of Annie Nations (Jessica Tandy), a woman passionately committed to both her farmland in the Blue Ridge Mountains and to the revered memory of her late husband, Hector (Hume Cronyn). Ultimately, she must make a life-changing decision, to accede to her son's wish that she move off the Mountain and sell her land to a real estate developer, or to spend her remaining years cloaked in her memories.

According to Hume Cronyn, the older people living in the mountains led lives "which were to some degree narrow, parochial, insular - but also enormously rich. These pioneers carved both a living and a tough joyous way of life out of unwelcoming mountain soil".

The character of Annie Nations is based on real-life Arie Carpenter. "Aunt Arie" told young students who came to interview her, "They want me to sell an' move away from here, but I won't do it. It's just home - That's all".

== Cast ==
- Jessica Tandy as Annie Nations
- Hume Cronyn as Hector Nations
- John Denver as Dillard Nations
- Gary Grubbs as Prince
- Harriet Hall as Holly
- Collin Wilcox as Madge Burton
- Joshua Bryson as Heckie
- Jenny Whitter as Becky
- Kenny Kosek as Fiddler
- Tony Trischka as Banjo
- Roger Mason as Bass

== Production ==
Foxfire was filmed on locations in North Carolina's Blue Ridge Mountains.

== Reception ==
=== Critical response ===
The film received positive reviews from critics. John J. O'Connor of The New York Times stated, "although the surface of Foxfire is gentle, as basically decent people try to understand each other and themselves, the subtext is far from comforting." O'Connor concluded his review by writing, "Foxfire is a sturdy vehicle. Heartily urged on by Mr. Cronyn, Miss Tandy takes it for a memorable spin." Don Shirley of the Los Angeles Times called the film "immensely affecting" and opined, "the holidays are when many people pause to ponder the themes of then and now, holding on and letting go, living and dying. And Foxfire illuminates these themes with an irresistible glow." Shirley also wrote that it "preserves the gorgeously tuned performances of Cronyn and Tandy."

=== Accolades ===
Year	Award	Category	Recipient(s)	Result	Ref.
1988	45th Golden Globe Awards	Best Miniseries or Television Film	Foxfire	Nominated	
1988	47th Peabody Awards	Institutional Award	Foxfire	Won	
1988	40th Primetime Emmy Awards	Outstanding Drama/Comedy Special	Marian Rees, Dorothea G. Petrie	Nominated	
1988	40th Primetime Emmy Awards	Outstanding Lead Actor in a Miniseries or a Special	Hume Cronyn	Nominated	
1988	40th Primetime Emmy Awards	Outstanding Lead Actress in a Miniseries or a Special	Jessica Tandy	Won	
1988	40th Primetime Emmy Awards	Outstanding Writing in a Miniseries or a Special	Susan Cooper	Nominated	
1988	40th Primetime Emmy Awards	Outstanding Music Composition for a Miniseries or a Special (Dramatic Underscore)	Johnny Mandel	Nominated	
1988	40th Primetime Emmy Awards	Outstanding Art Direction for a Miniseries or a Special	Jan Scott, Erica Rogalla	Won	
1988	40th Primetime Emmy Awards	Outstanding Editing for a Miniseries or a Special (Single Camera Production)	Paul LaMastra	Nominated	
1988	40th Primetime Emmy Awards	Outstanding Sound Mixing for a Dramatic Miniseries or a Special	Hank Garfield, William Gazecki, William Nicholson, Peter Reale	Nominated	
