= Ramah Darom =

Jewish summer camp in Georgia, United States

Coordinates: 34°56′41″N 83°29′44″W

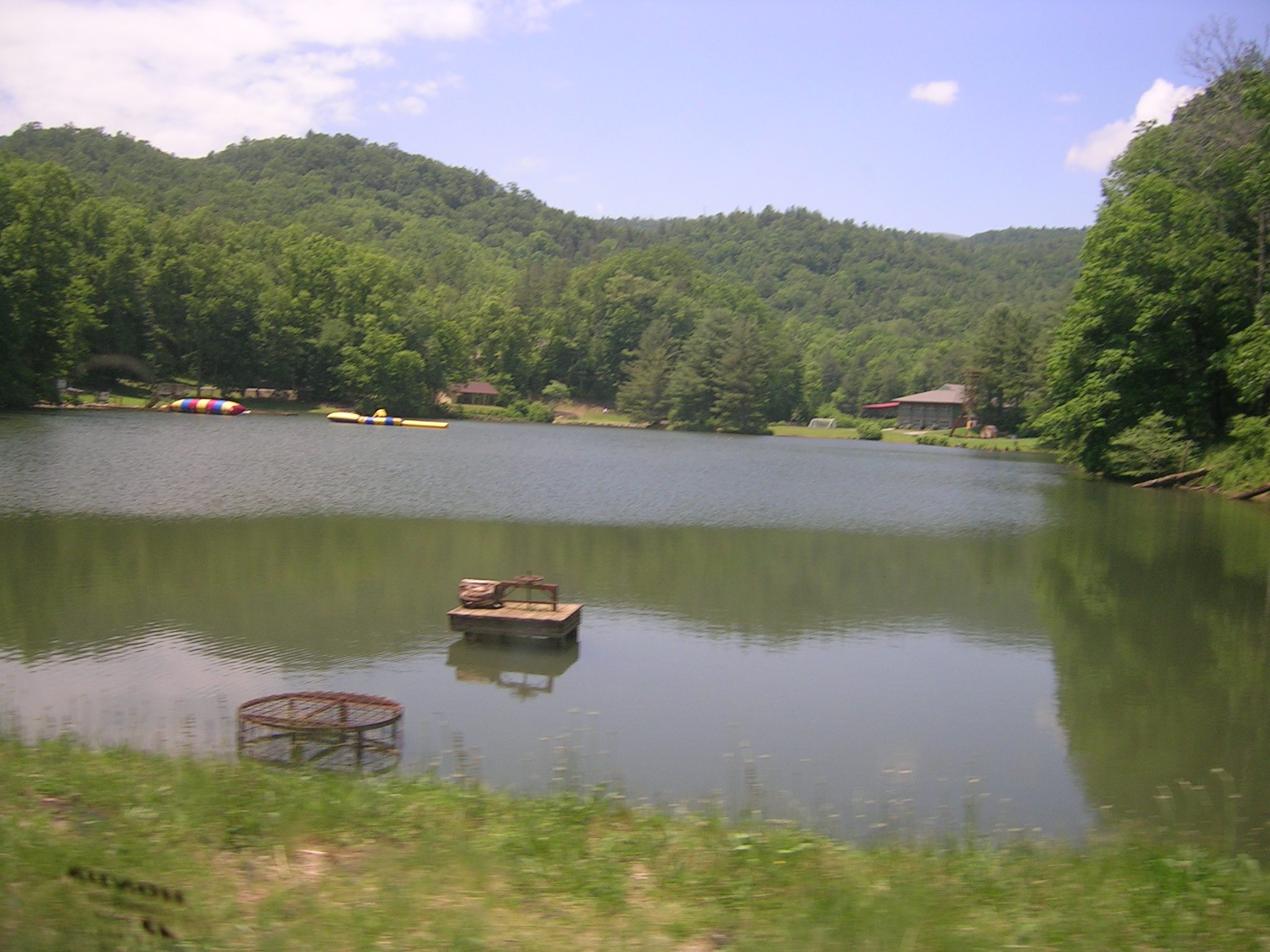
A view of the lake at Camp Ramah Darom

Ramah Darom is a Jewish summer camp affiliated with the Conservative movement in Clayton, Georgia.

== History ==
Ramah Darom opened in 1997. The camp aims to inspire a lifelong love of Jewish values, tradition and community. Ramah Darom is located on 128.19 acres (0.5188 km^{2}) of land in the Appalachian Valley. The lake is fed by mountain brooks and a 100-foot (30 m) waterfall. The camp is surrounded by over 10,000 acres (40 km^{2}) of wilderness and hiking trails in the Chattahoochee National Forest. Ramah Darom attracts campers and staff from Georgia, Florida, North Carolina, South Carolina, Texas, Oklahoma, Israel, Tennessee, Alabama, Louisiana, Mississippi, Ohio, Illinois, Arkansas, and Nebraska. The camp is co-ed, Hebrew speaking, and kosher. All staff are college or university students.

The summer is divided into two four-week sessions, Aleph and Bet. Generally campers attend one session, while some opt to go both sessions. The minimum eidah (age-group) to attend either Session Aleph or Bet is Nitzanim. rising 4th graders. The minimum eidah to attend both Session Aleph and Bet is Chalutzim, rising 6th graders. However, for the oldest eidah, Gesher, attendance to both sessions is required. Each eidah is informally known as its Gesher year's Roman Numerals (Eidah Gesher in Kayitz of (Summer) 2026 is known as, XXVI, or Double X V I).

== Camp Leadership ==
Rabbi Loren Sykes, the camp's first director, was replaced by Geoff Menkowitz, a former Assistant Director, and then Anna Serviansky. The staff includes a delegation of Israelis.

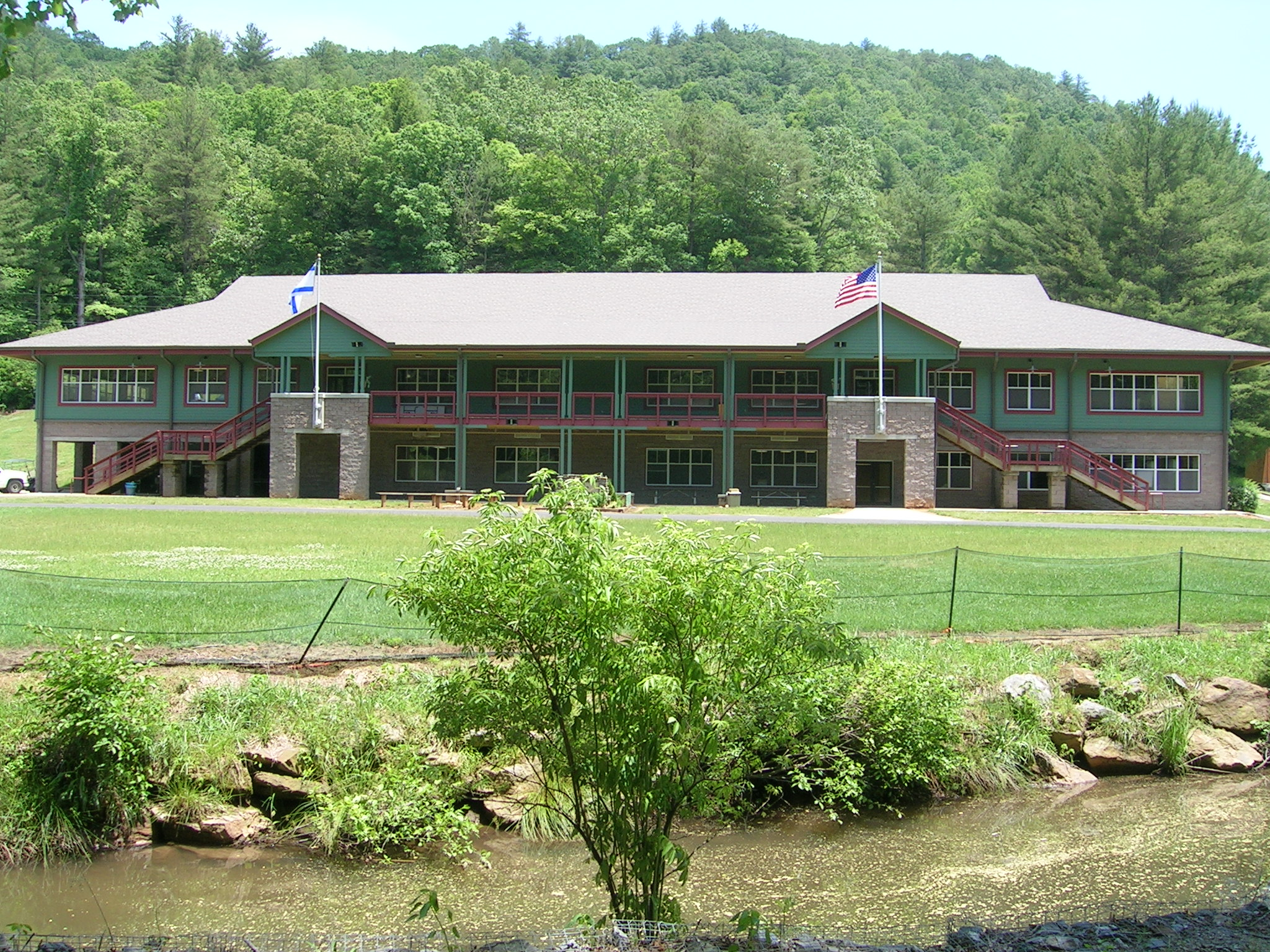
Dining hall or chadar ochel at Ramah Darom

== Special needs programs ==
The Tikvah Support Program was inaugurated in 2015. This program offers a summer experience for campers diagnosed with Neurodevelopmental Disorders. Tikvah Support Staff members are specially trained to work with children in this program. It is open to children in sixth through twelfth grade.

The camp also hosts Camp Yofi, a special 5-day session (held after the main sessions) for families with autistic children. Programs and activities are provided for the children and their siblings, as well as the parents.

== See also ==
- Conservative Judaism
- Jewish education
