= Tiger, Georgia =

- Town
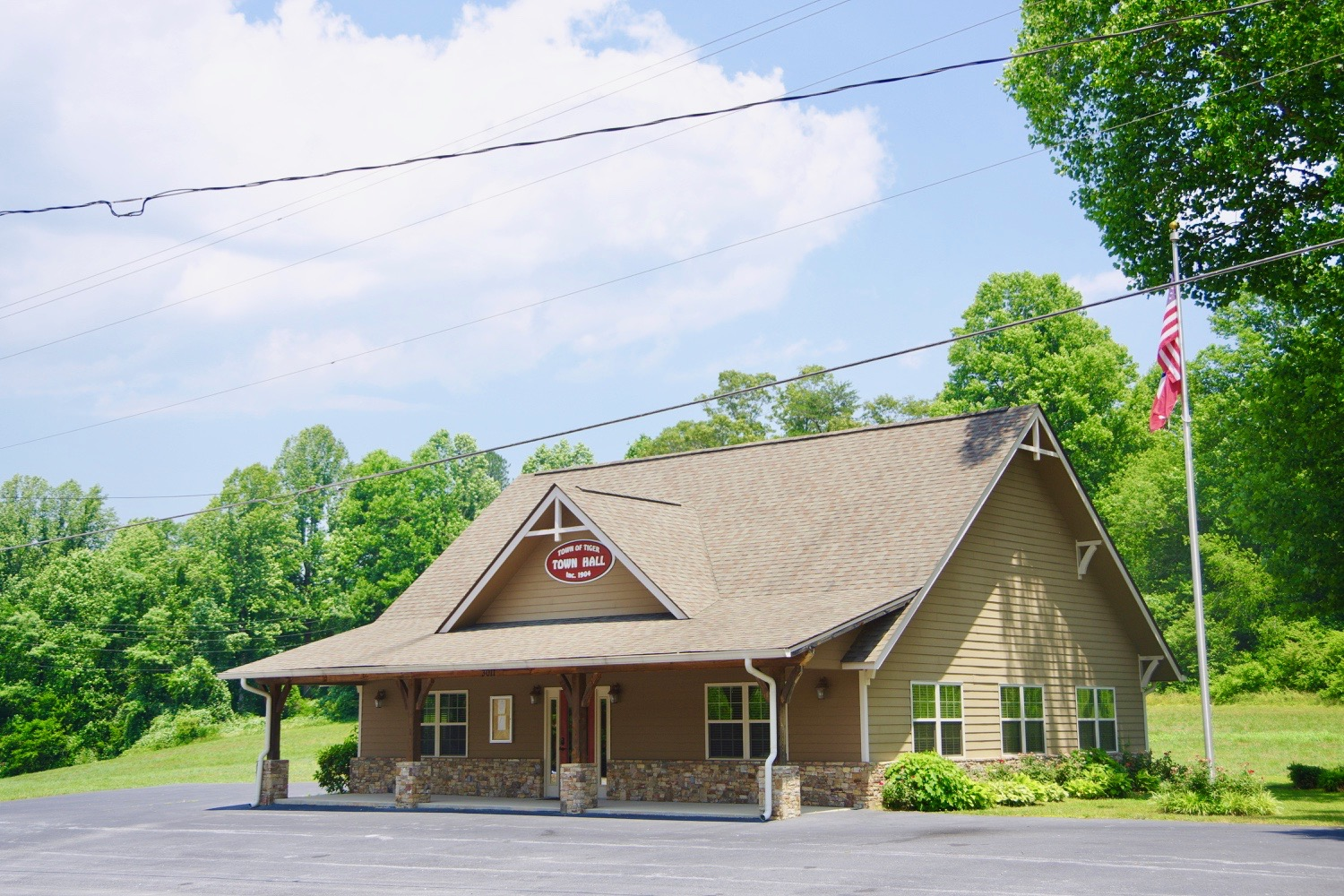
- Town Hall in Tiger

- Location in Rabun County and the state of Georgia
- Coordinates: 34°50′45″N 83°25′59″W
- Country: United States
- State: Georgia
- County: Rabun

Area
  - Total: 0.83 sq mi (2.15 km^{2})
  - Land: 0.83 sq mi (2.15 km^{2})
  - Water: 0 sq mi (0.00 km^{2})
- Elevation: 1,962 ft (598 m)

Population (2020)
  - Total: 422
  - Density: 509.5/sq mi (196.71/km^{2})
- Time zone: UTC-5 (Eastern (EST))
  - Summer (DST): UTC-4 (EDT)
- ZIP code: 30576
- Area code: 706
- FIPS code: 13-76504
- GNIS feature ID: 2406733
- Website: https://www.cityoftiger.com/

Tiger is a town in Rabun County, Georgia, United States. The population was 574 at the 2020 census, up from 408 at the 2010 census.

== History ==
The Georgia General Assembly incorporated Tiger as a town in 1904.

There are two popular legends as to the derivation of the town's name: the first is that it was named after a Cherokee chief named Tiger Tail, while the second (and more likely) story is that the name originated from the cry of roaming panthers.

== Geography ==
Tiger lies in the extreme northeastern part of the state, just a few miles west of the Georgia-South Carolina border, and a few miles south of the Georgia-North Carolina border. The town's elevation is 1,962 feet (598 m), with several wooded hilltops reaching elevations of 2,100 to 2,200 feet. The town sits at the base of 2,856-foot Tiger Mountain, a prominent Blue Ridge Mountain peak.

According to the United States Census Bureau, the town has a total area of 0.8 square miles (2.1 km^{2}), all land.

== Demographics ==
Historical population
Census	Pop.	Note	%±
1910	125		—
1920	167		33.6%
1930	137		−18.0%
1940	289		110.9%
1950	269		−6.9%
1960	277		3.0%
1970	312		12.6%
1980	299		−4.2%
1990	301		0.7%
2000	316		5.0%
2010	408		29.1%
2020	422		3.4%
U.S. Decennial Census

As of the census of 2000, there were 316 people, 137 households, and 77 families residing in the town. The population density was 384.2 inhabitants per square mile (148.3/km^{2}). There were 161 housing units at an average density of 195.7 per square mile (75.6/km^{2}). The racial makeup of the town was 98.10% White and 1.90% African American. Hispanic or Latino people of any race were 1.90% of the population.

There were 137 households, out of which 25.5% had children under the age of 18 living with them, 46.0% were married couples living together, 8.8% had a female householder with no husband present, and 43.1% were non-families. 38.0% of all households were made up of individuals, and 15.3% had someone living alone who was 65 years of age or older. The average household size was 2.23 and the average family size was 3.01.

In the town, the population was spread out, with 21.5% under the age of 18, 7.3% from 18 to 24, 23.1% from 25 to 44, 27.8% from 45 to 64, and 20.3% who were 65 years of age or older. The median age was 44 years. For every 100 females, there were 88.1 males. For every 100 females age 18 and over, there were 86.5 males.

The median income for a household in the town was $27,875, and the median income for a family was $31,563. Males had a median income of $26,875 versus $21,250 for females. The per capita income for the town was $15,453. About 7.8% of families and 18.2% of the population were below the poverty line, including 20.4% of those under age 18 and 28.3% of those age 65 or over.

== Education ==
The Rabun County Board of Education administrative offices are headquartered in the former South Rabun Elementary School building near the center of Tiger. Just southeast of the city are Rabun County High School (grades 9–12), Rabun County Middle School (7–8), Rabun County Elementary School (3–6), and Rabun County Primary School (pre-kindergarten-2).

== Economy ==
The most prominent attractions in Tiger include the Tiger Drive-In, Goats on the Roof, Tiger Mountain Vineyards and Stonewall Creek Vineyards. Tiger is home to the Rabun County High School, Middle School, Elementary School, and Primary School as well as the county senior center, and an assisted living center named Traces of Tiger. Tiger is also home to Camp Covecrest, a Life Teen retreat center, mission base and summer camp.

== Notable people ==
- Matt Gurtler, state representative
- Gunner Stockton, quarterback for the University of Georgia Bulldogs
- Charlie Woerner, tight end for the Atlanta Falcons
