= Foxfire (play) =

Play based on the Foxfire books

Foxfire is a play with songs and book by Susan Cooper, Hume Cronyn, music by Jonathan Brielle (Holtzman) and lyrics by Susan Cooper, Hume Cronyn, and Jonathan Brielle. The show was based on the Foxfire books, about Appalachian culture and traditions in north Georgia and the struggle to keep the traditions alive.

The play was first produced at the Stratford Festival in 1980. The play received its U.S. premiere at the Guthrie Theater in September 1981, with Jessica Tandy (Annie Nations), Hume Cronyn (Hector Nations), William Newman (Prinz Carpenter), Katherine Cortez (Holly Burrell), Richard Cox (Dillard Nations) and Oliver Cliff (Doctor) in the cast, directed by Marshall Mason. The 1982 Broadway production starred Jessica Tandy, Cronyn's wife, who won the Drama Desk Award for Outstanding Actress in a Play and the Tony Award for Best Actress in a Play for her performance. It costarred Hume Cronyn and Keith Carradine, who played a country music performer selling out the old traditions for profit. Carradine sang most of the songs in the show and most notable were the close of Act 1, "My Feet Took T' Walkin'." Other songs in the show included: "Sweet Talker," "Dear Lord," "Young Lady Take A Warning," and "Red Ear."

== Plot ==
Annie Nations lives alone in the mountains after the death of her husband, Hector, five years prior. His ghost remains, however, with only Annie being able to see and hear him. Prince Carpenter, a real-estate buyer who wants to turn the Nations' property into a resort, arrives and attempts to convince Annie to sell after failing to convince Hector to do so five years previously, but her son, Dillard, arrives and makes Prince leave. Dillard reunites with his mother and his childhood friend Holly Burrell, and the three attend a concert of Dillard's, where he plays "My Feet Took T' Walkin", but in an upbeat and happy way, which somewhat upsets Annie. After the concert, Dillard returns home and plays the original version of the song, which is slow and somber. Throughout the play, there are flashbacks of Hector, Annie, and Dillard's lives, including Annie and Hector's meeting, Dillard's birth, Hector's death, and Hector's funeral, amongst others. Ultimately, Annie decides to sell the property to Prince, and she can no longer see or hear Hector's ghost as a result. The play ends with a monologue from Hector, which concludes with the words "She'll be back."

== Film adaptation ==
The play was adapted as a 1987 TV movie in which Tandy reprised her role; she won an Emmy Award. The role originated by Carradine was played by John Denver.
