= Rabun Gap-Nacoochee School =

Private school in Rabun Gap, Georgia, US

Coordinates: 34.96247°N 83.38917°W

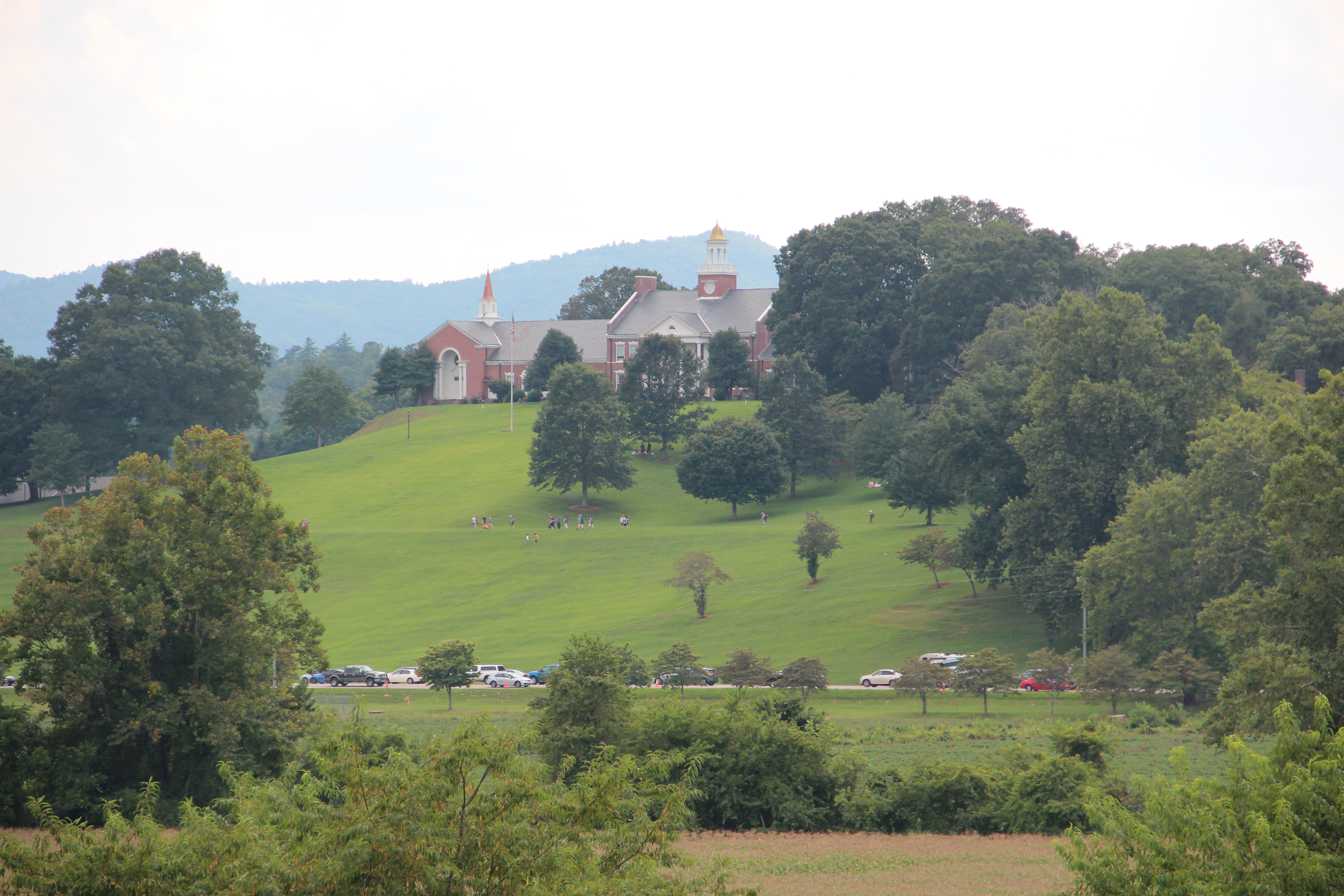
- Rabun Gap school viewed from the Dillard House

Location
- 339 Nacoochee Dr. Rabun Gap, Georgia; United States

Information
- Type: Private, co-educational
- Motto: Lead The Way
- Established: 1903
- Founder: Andrew Jackson Ritchie
- Head of School: Robert Ahrens
- Head of Upper School: Kate McGroarty
- Head of Middle School: Justin Parris
- Head of Lower School: Renee Rogers
- Chaplain: Reverend Ozu Mejia
- Grades: K-12th
- Gender: Co-ed
- Enrollment: 685
- Colors: Green, white, and gold
- Athletics: NCISAA
- Mascot: Eagle (formerly Indian)
- Rival: Upper School: Asheville School Middle School: Summit Charter
- Affiliation: Presbyterian Church
- Website: www.rabungap.org

Rabun Gap-Nacoochee School (informally known as Rabun Gap) is a small, private college preparatory school located in Rabun County, Georgia, United States, in the Appalachian Mountains. It is both a boarding and a day school. Rabun Gap is notable for initiating the Foxfire magazine project in 1966, experiential education based on interviewing local people, and writing and publishing articles about their stories and oral traditions. This inspired numerous schools across the country to develop similar programs.

In addition to its strong academic program, it is one of the few schools in the country to include a cirque (circus) skills program in its curriculum today. The students put on an annual performance.

Rabun Gap is home to boarding students from 50 countries and 15 states.

== History ==
Rabun Gap-Nacoochee School is one of the largest coeducational, college-preparatory boarding schools in the South, serving boarding and day students in grades Pre-K through 12th grade. Boarding starts in 7th grade. Located in Rabun Gap, the 1,400-acre (5.7 km^{2}) campus is cradled in the mountains of northeast Georgia. The school combines a strong academic program, mountain setting, and Presbyterian heritage to nurture and challenge students of diverse backgrounds as they prepare for college and a lifetime of service.

Andrew Jackson Ritchie, a Rabun County native, and his wife, Addie Corn Ritchie, founded the Rabun Gap Industrial School in 1903 to serve the children of the isolated and poverty-stricken community of Rabun Gap. With $1 and a personal note, Ritchie bought a 5-acre (20,000 m^{2}) hilltop for the school. Construction began on the two-story main building, designed by Atlanta architect Haralson Bleckley (son of Rabun County native Logan Bleckley), with pledges of cash support and manual labor. The school was open to both boys and girls.

Donations to the school declined during the World War I period (1917–18), but Ritchie traveled to Boston, Massachusetts, and New York City to solicit funding. He had a unique plan for expansion and development called the Farm Family Settlement Program. Whole families would live at Rabun Gap, with the men learning agriculture, the women studying homemaking and health care, and the children continuing with regular studies. The Carnegie Foundation, the John D. Rockefeller family, and other northern philanthropists provided generous support for his idea. However, it was Ernest Woodruff, of the Coca-Cola Company and Trust Company of Georgia, who proved to be the bedrock supporter of Rabun Gap. According to school legend, Ritchie went door to door in Atlanta's Inman Park neighborhood asking for donations; at the Woodruff home, Emily Winship, Woodruff's wife, contributed money from her household fund and urged her husband to help. (Over time, several members of the Woodruff family, as well as the Robert W. Woodruff Foundation, have made donations to the school.) With additional support from the United Daughters of the Confederacy, the school expanded with more acreage and the construction of farmhouses and barns. The farm family program remained successful until the 1970s, when textile manufacturing became key in Rabun County.

After a 1926 stove fire destroyed the school, Rabun Gap merged in 1927 with the Nacoochee Institute, founded in 1903 and formerly located in Sautee, Georgia. Headed by the Reverend John Knox Coit, the Nacoochee Institute was a boarding school for boys and girls as well as a public school for the students of White County. Six weeks after Rabun Gap's fire, the schoolhouse of the Nacoochee Institute burned as well. In September 1928 the Rabun Gap-Nacoochee School opened at Rabun Gap with a new school building. Ritchie served as president and Coit as co-president.

In 1927 the new school established a covenant with the Presbyterian Church (later PCUSA), a relationship that still exists. In 1934 Ritchie and members of the board of trustees added two years of junior college to the Rabun Gap curriculum. Training teachers for the county was a main goal, and courses were patterned after those offered at the University of Georgia. World War II (1941–45) brought an end to the junior college program, as the war siphoned off enrollment.

The end of the 1930s brought numerous changes in leadership for Rabun Gap-Nacoochee School. Following the retirement of Ritchie and Coit, George Bellingrath served as president from 1939 to 1948. O.C. Skinner, former industrial manager of the Berry School in Rome, Georgia (founded by educator Martha Berry), was president from 1949 to 1956. Several buildings were added during Skinner's tenure, including the Addie Corn Ritchie Dining Hall, the Emily and Ernest Woodruff Chapel wing of Hodgson Hall, the Annie Lee Jones Library wing of Hodgson Hall, and the Arthur W. Smith Industrial Shop. From 1956 to 1984 Karl K. Anderson served as president. Under his leadership, the Andrew Jackson Ritchie Gymnasium, the O.C. Skinner Natatorium, and four dormitory residence halls named for George Woodruff (son of Ernest), Irene Woodruff (wife of George), Ernest Woodruff, and Karl Anderson were built. Financial support also came from the Rabun Gap-Nacoochee guilds of Athens and Atlanta, the Rabun Gap-Nacoochee Club of Atlanta, and the Presbyterian Church.

In 1966 students in the English class started writing and publishing Foxfire, a quarterly magazine with articles based on their interviews with residents about Appalachian culture. It was a project initiated by the teacher Eliot Wigginton to engage students in learning to use proper English. It gained national attention after a collection of articles was published in book form in 1972 and became a surprise bestseller. The magazine and book (followed by more) aroused people's interest in traditional crafts and skills at a time when some people were trying to live more simply.

Having partly functioned as a public school for students in the north end of Rabun County, Rabun Gap-Nacoochee School became fully private in the fall of 1977, as Rabun County consolidated its public high schools. Struggling financially with the loss of public monies, the school suffered from less stable enrollment and the need to reconnect with its core strengths from the past. Anderson retired as president in 1984, and his successors were the Reverend Bruce Dodd (1984–92), Robert Johnston (1992–96), and Gregory Zeigler (1996–2004). They moved to create a college-preparatory curriculum and enforce more rigorous admissions standards. A building program, funded in part by a bequest of George Woodruff, resulted in the Morris Brown Science Building, the Arts and Technology Building, a new library, and athletic fields. From 2004 until 2011, John Marshall was the head of Rabun Gap-Nacoochee School. The school gained ground in a host of important areas, including enrollment, student support services, competitive athletics, alumni relations, board development, annual giving growth, and facilities and grounds upkeep. Dr. Anthony Sgro served as Head of the School from 2011 to 2019. Under his leadership, the School opened the Evelyne Sheats Lower School and expanded to serving students of all ages, from Pre–K to 12th grade. Dr. Sgro also helped grow Rabun Gap's international student population increase to represent 50 countries. Jeff Miles became the eleventh Head of the School in 2019.

The Rabun Gap motto of "Work, Study, Worship" is still dominant. Today, a small number of students are the first generation in their families to attend college. Over 75% of students receive some form of financial aid. Enrollment averages 680, with more than 60% boarding students in the Upper School. The School continues its historic commitment to financial aid, allocating over $3.5 million annually through the advent of Georgia's tax credit program coupled with the generosity of the school's constituencies and endowment interest.

== Student life ==
Rabun Gap is one of few schools in the United States that offer a cirque program. Started in 2001 by award-winning theater director Larry Smith, cirque is now part of the curriculum. Cirque combines theatre performance, acrobatics, and dance. They have an impressive array of apparatuses, including trapeze, German wheel, aerial silks, aerial hoop, Spanish web, triple trapeze, and aerial cube. Each spring, the school puts on a cirque performance and packs the Rearden Theater for sold-out performances.

The school also has a climbing wall, and a private lake (Indian Lake) for water activities.

Ongoing events at Rabun Gap include MAD Fest (the annual talent show and contest) and annual sporting events.

Rabun Gap has seven dorms: one middle school and junior girls' dorm (George), one exclusive senior dorm (Jane), three high school boys dorms (one of which is shared with middle school boys) (Bellingrath, Ernest, Irene), one freshman girls' dorm (Anderson), and one sophomore-junior girls' dorm (Coit).

== Notable alumni ==
- Tijan Sallah (class of 1977), poet
- Pallas Kunaiyi-Akpannah (class of 2015), WNBA player and Olympian representing Nigeria
- Marlin Klein (class of 2022), NFL tight end for the Houston Texans
- Marshall Pritchett (class of 2025), college football tight end for the Alabama Crimson Tide
