= Rabun County High School =

County high school in rural Georgia

Coordinates: 34°49′39″N 83°25′16″W

Location
- 230 Wildcat Hill Drive; Tiger, (Rabun County), Georgia 30576; United States

Information
- Type: Public high school
- Principal: Justin Spillers
- Staff: 54.60 (FTE)
- Enrollment: 661 (2023-2024)
- Student to teacher ratio: 12.11
- Colors: Red and white
- Nickname: Wildcats
- Website: https://www.rabuncountyschools.org/rabun-county-high-school

Rabun County High School is a public high school operated by the Rabun County School District. It is located on the edge of Tiger, a town in Rabun County in the U.S. state of Georgia. It is the original venue of Foxfire magazine and related projects.

== Notable alumni ==
- Charlie Woerner (class of 2016), NFL tight end for the Atlanta Falcons, played college football at the University of Georgia
- Gunner Stockton (class of 2022), Current University of Georgia QB

== See also ==
- Rabun Gap-Nacoochee School
- Foxfire (magazine)
