= Foxfire (magazine) =

Student-written magazine and book series

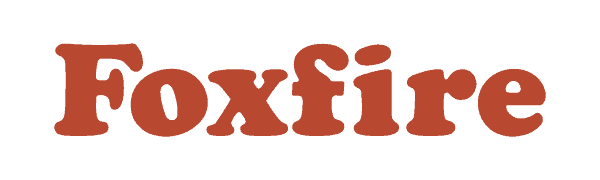
- Founder: Eliot Wigginton
- Founded: 1966
- First issue: Spring 1967
- Company: The Foxfire Fund, Inc.
- Country: United States
- Language: English
- Website: foxfire.org
- ISSN: 1084-5321
- OCLC: 30497404

Foxfire magazine began in 1966, written and published as a quarterly American magazine by students at Rabun Gap-Nacoochee School, a private secondary education school located in the U.S. state of Georgia. At the time Foxfire began, Rabun Gap Nacoochee School was also operating as a public secondary education school for students who were residents of northern Rabun County, Georgia. An example of experiential education, the magazine had articles based on the students' interviews with local people about aspects and practices in Appalachian culture. They captured oral history, craft traditions, and other material about the culture. When the articles were collected and published in book form in 1972, it became a bestseller nationally and gained attention for the Foxfire project.

The magazine was named for foxfire, a term for a naturally occurring bioluminescence in fungi in the forests of North Georgia. In 1977, the Foxfire project moved from the Rabun Gap-Nacoochee School to the newly built and consolidated public Rabun County High School. Additional books were published, and with profits from magazine and book sales, the students created a not-for-profit educational and literary organization and a museum.

Today, the organization is overseen by a governing board of directors, with day-to-day operations managed by an executive director and paid staff. The magazine program is now a summer internship for high school-aged students living in Rabun County. The program supports up to 12 students for six weeks each summer. These students are responsible for the publishing the Foxfire Magazine.

== History ==
In 1966, Eliot Wigginton and his students in an English class at the Rabun Gap-Nacoochee School initiated a project to engage students in writing. The class decided to publish a magazine over the course of the semester. Its articles were the product of the students' interviewing their relatives and local citizens about how lifestyles had changed over the course of their lives and dealt with traditions in the rural area. First published in 1966, the magazine covers topics of the lifestyle, culture, crafts, and skills of people in southern Appalachia. The content is written as a mixture of how-to information, first-person narratives, oral history, and folklore.

The Foxfire project has published Foxfire magazine continuously since 1966. In 1972, the first of the highly popular Foxfire books was published, which collected published articles as well as new material. Both the magazine and books are based on the stories and life of elders and students, featuring advice and personal stories about subjects as wide-ranging as hog dressing, faith healing, blacksmithing, and Appalachian local and regional history. Foxfire moved from Rabun Gap-Nacoochee School to Rabun County High School in 1977.

One of the most famous contacts in the Foxfire books was a woman named Arie Carpenter, also known as "Aunt Arie."

In 1992 Wigginton pled guilty to child molestation, after more than twenty former students came forward prepared to testify that Wigginton had molested them as children. After his confession, the Foxfire Fund announced Wigginton's "total separation" from the organization.

Since that time, the Foxfire Fund board of directors has governed operations of Foxfire's physical and intellectual properties. Day-to-day operations of the organizations programs and projects is managed by an executive director, who reports to the board, and additional full-time staff.

== Books ==
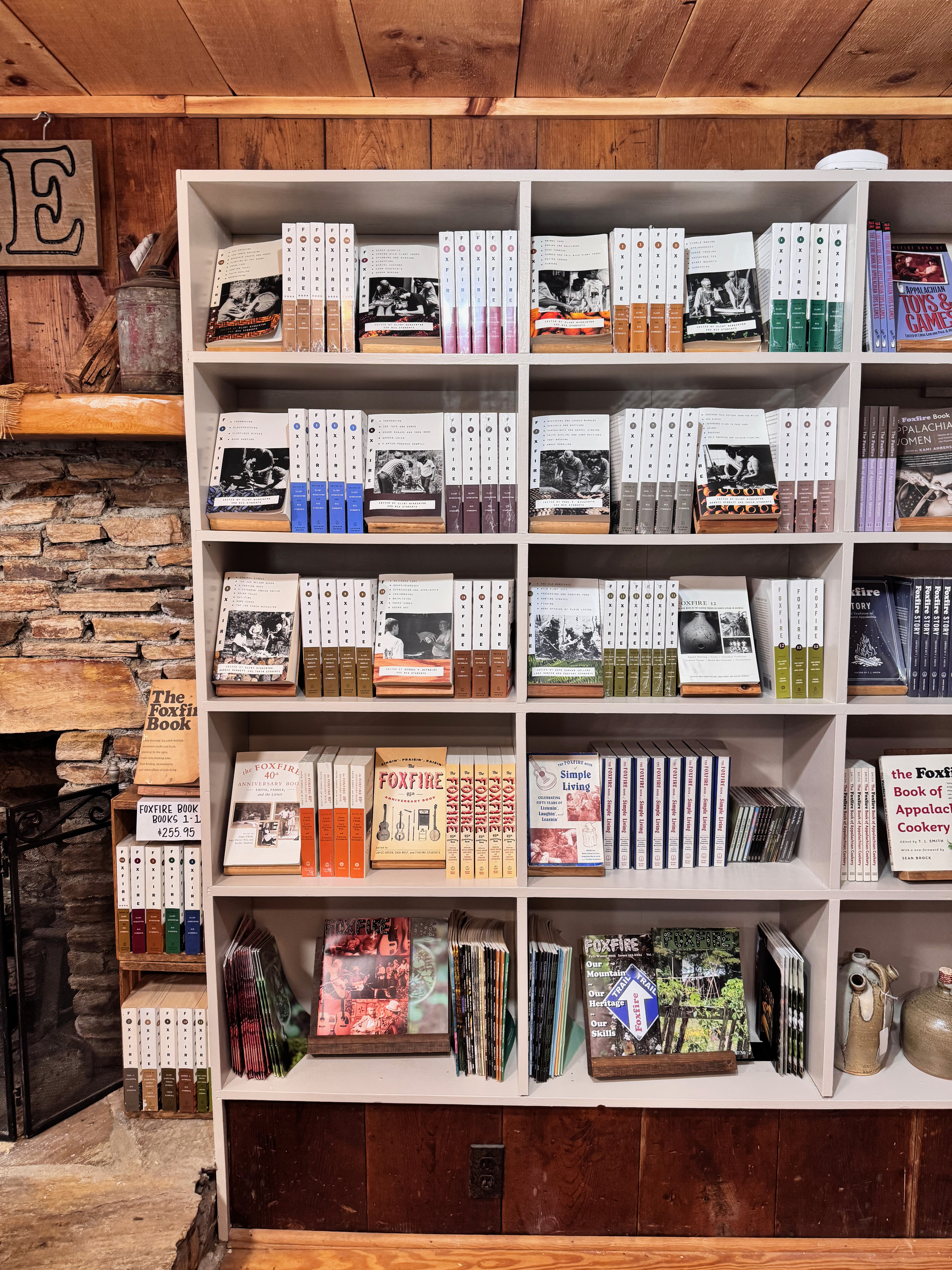
Foxfire books on display at the Foxfire Museum and Heritage Center in Mountain City, Georgia

The Foxfire books are a series of copyrighted anthologies of articles originally written for Foxfire magazine, along with additional content not suitable for the magazine format. Though first conceived primarily as a sociological work, recounting oral traditions, the books, particularly the early ones, were a commercial success as instructional works.

Members of the 1970s back-to-the-land movement used the books as a basis to return to lives of simplicity. The first book was published in 1972 as The Foxfire Book. This was followed by an additional 11 books, titled in sequence Foxfire 2 through Foxfire 12. The students have published several additional specialty books under the Foxfire name, some of which have been published by the University of North Carolina Press.

Published by Random House-Anchor, the magazine and anthologies have become a continuing project of The Foxfire Fund, Inc.

=== Main series ===
- The Foxfire Book, 1972, Anchor. ISBN 0-385-07353-4
- Foxfire 2, 1973, Anchor. ISBN 0-385-02267-0
- Foxfire 3, 1975, Anchor. ISBN 0-385-02272-7
- Foxfire 4, 1977, Anchor. ISBN 0-385-12087-7
- Foxfire 5, 1979, Anchor. ISBN 0-385-14308-7
- Foxfire 6, 1980, Anchor. ISBN 0-385-15272-8
- Foxfire 7, 1982, Anchor. ISBN 0-385-15243-4
- Foxfire 8, 1984, Anchor. ISBN 0-385-17741-0
- Foxfire 9, 1986, Anchor. ISBN 0-385-17743-7
- Foxfire 10, 1993, Anchor. ISBN 0-385-42276-8
- Foxfire 11, 1999, Anchor. ISBN 0-385-49461-0
- Foxfire 12, 2004, Anchor. ISBN 1-4000-3261-X

=== Other books ===
- Foxfire Book of Appalachian Women: Stories of Landscape and Community in the Mountain South, Edited by Kami Ahrens, 2023, University of North Carolina Press, ISBN 1469670038
- Foxfire Story: Oral Tradition in Southern Appalachia, Edited by T. J. Smith, 2020, Anchor, ISBN 0525436316
- The Foxfire Book of Appalachian Cookery, Edited by T. J. Smith, 1984; 1992; 2019 University of North Carolina Press, ISBN 0-8078-4395-4, 1469647540
- Hudgins, Phil and Jessica Phillips, Travels With Foxfire: Stories of People, Passions, and Practices in Southern Appalachia, 2018, Anchor, ISBN 0525436294
- The Foxfire Book of Simple Living: Celebrating Fifty Years of Listenin', Laughin', and Learnin', Edited by Kaye Carver Collins, Jonathan Blackstock, and Foxfire Students, 2016, Anchor, ISBN 0804173109
- The Foxfire 45th Anniversary Book: Singin', Praisin', Raisin', 2011, Anchor, ISBN 978-0-307-74259-9
- The Foxfire 40th Anniversary Book: Faith, Family, and the Land, 2006, Anchor. ISBN 0-307-27551-5.
- Foxfire's Book of Wood Stove Cookery, 1981; 2006, Foxfire Press OCLC 8249597, 55188938
- Teaching by Heart: The Foxfire Interviews, 2004, Teacher's College Press. ISBN 0-8077-4539-1 (hardbound), ISBN 0-8077-4538-3 (paperback)
- Memories of a Mountain Shortline, 1976, Foxfire Press; 2001, Ferm Creek Press (Commemorative Anniversary Edition). ISBN 189365110X
- A Foxfire Christmas, 1996, University of North Carolina Press. ISBN 0-8078-4618-X
- The Foxfire Book of Appalachian Toys & Games, 1985; 1993, University of North Carolina Press, ISBN 0-8078-4425-X
- Foxfire 25 Years: A Celebration of Our First Quarter Century, 1991, Anchor, ISBN 0-385-41346-7
- The Foxfire Book of Wine Making, 1987, E. P. Dutton. ISBN 0-525-48274-1 (hardbound) ISBN 0-525-24467-0 (paperback).
- Eliot Wigginton, Sometimes a Shining Moment: The Foxfire Experience, New York: Anchor, 1985. ISBN 0-385-13358-8
- Aunt Arie: A Foxfire Portrait, 1983, Dutton; 1992, University of North Carolina Press. ISBN 978-0807843772

== Foxfire Fund ==
The students used some of their revenues to set up the Foxfire Fund, a not-for-profit educational and literary organization in Rabun County, Georgia. It encourages use of the stories and practical instructions from the local people of Appalachia to teach and promote a self-sufficient, self-reflective way of life.

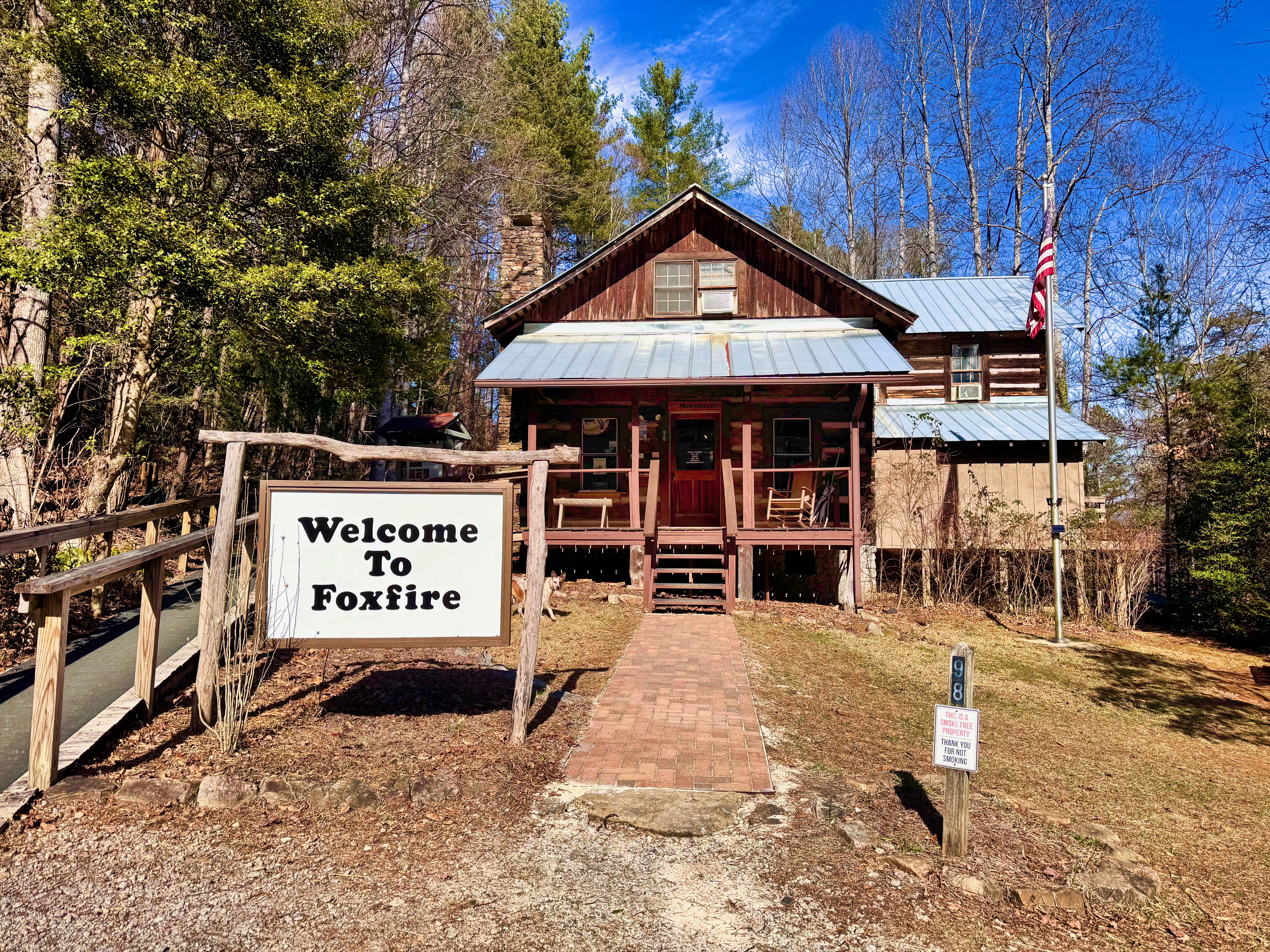
The Foxfire Museum and Heritage Center in Mountain City, Georgia

Rabun County students, who saw their project revenues increasing as a result of the Foxfire books' best-seller status, also decided to create a museum. They purchased a tract of land on Black Rock Mountain, in Mountain City, Georgia. They founded a museum of Appalachian culture there, the Foxfire Museum and Heritage Center. Students helped move and reconstruct some 30 log structures, including single-family cabins, a grist mill, barn, smokehouse, springhouse, other outbuildings and more, to preserve aspects of the traditional Appalachian way of life. The Foxfire Fund headquarters are also located on the museum site at 200 Foxfire Lane, Mountain City, Georgia.

== Educational philosophy ==
In 1989, Eliot Wigginton was awarded a MacArthur Foundation fellowship for his work with the Foxfire project. Wigginton had developed the Foxfire educational philosophy based on experiential education.

Wigginton originally thought of the student-produced magazine as a way to help his high school freshmen see the relevance of good English skills. As he and they developed the journals, over several years he began to develop a full teaching approach (a.k.a. the Foxfire approach), which features 11 core principles, related to the philosopher John Dewey's concepts of experiential education. The Foxfire Fund contributed to such development. During the late 1960s through the 1980s, the success of Foxfire inspired many United States schools to develop similar programs. By 1998, it had been adopted by 37 school systems. The Foxfire Fund started offering teacher training programs to support such efforts.

Foxfire continues to train educators in its constructivist methods, which begins with the assertion that students must construct meaning for themselves, rather than memorizing information a teacher deems important. Foxfire and other constructivist approaches to teaching propose that by constructing their own meaning, establishing relationships, and seeing the connection of what they do in the classroom to "the real world," students are better able to learn.

As a result of changing ideas in education, Rabun County High School moved the Foxfire magazine/book class from English to the business curriculum and pulled students away from operations of the museum as they once were. In 2018, Foxfire removed the program from the Rabun County School System and revised it as a six-week, paid summer internship for any high school-aged students living in Rabun County, which opened the program to those students attending area private schools as well as homeschooled students. The program averages around a dozen students/summer and those students remain active throughout the year, conducting interviews and publishing the magazine.

The museum is being assisted by the University of Georgia to archive and preserve its extensive materials from more than 30 years of research. In 1998, the University of Georgia anthropology department started to work with the Foxfire project. The collection is held at one of the cabins of the museum complex and includes "2,000 hours of interviews on audio tape, 30,000 black and white pictures, and hundreds of hours of videotape." By improving how the material is archived and establishing a database, the university believes the materials can be made more easily available for scholars.

== Topics ==
The books cover a wide range of topics, many to do with crafts, tools, music and other aspects of traditional life skills and culture in Appalachia. These include making apple butter, banjos, basket weaving, beekeeping, butter churning, corn shucking, dulcimers, faith healing, Appalachian folk magic, fiddle making, haints, American ginseng cultivation, long rifle and flintlock making, hide tanning, hog dressing, hunting tales, log cabin building, moonshining, midwives, old-time burial customs, planting "by the signs", preserving foods, sassafras tea, snake handling and lore, soap making, spinning, square dancing, wagon making, weaving, wild food gathering, witches, and wood carving.

== See also ==
- Homesteading
- Rural
