= Jessica Tandy =

British-American actress (1909–1994)

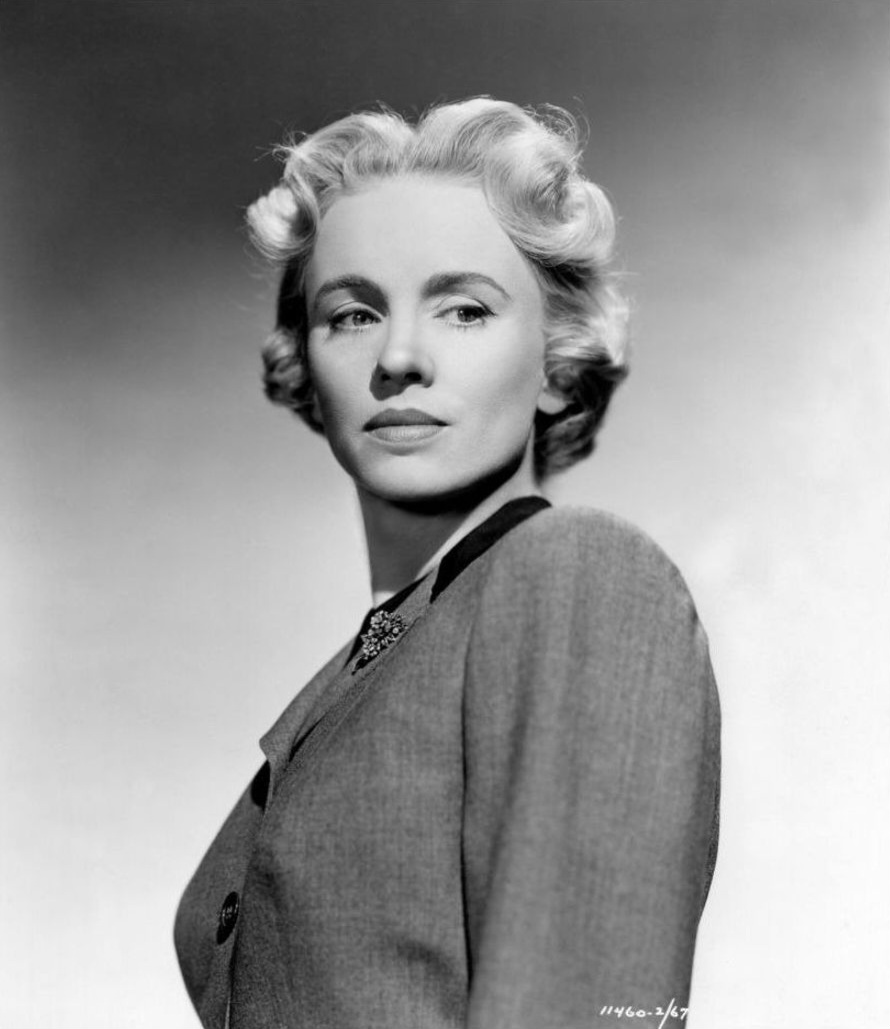
- Tandy in 1959
- Born: Jessie Alice Tandy; 7 June 1909; Stoke Newington, London, England
- Died: 11 September 1994 (aged 85); Easton, Connecticut, US
- Citizenship: United Kingdom; United States (from 1952)
- Occupation: Actress
- Years active: 1927–1994
- Spouses: Jack Hawkins (m. 1932; div. 1940) Hume Cronyn (m. 1942)
- Children: 3

Jessie Alice Tandy (7 June 1909 – 11 September 1994), known professionally as Jessica Tandy, was an English and American actress. She appeared in over 100 stage productions and had more than 60 roles in film and TV, receiving an Academy Award, four Tony Awards, a BAFTA Award, a Golden Globe Award, a David di Donatello Award, a Saturn Award, a Photoplay Award and a Primetime Emmy Award. Tandy is one of few performers to achieve Triple Crown of Acting status.

Tandy won a Tony Award for Best Actress in a Play for playing Blanche DuBois in the original Broadway production of A Streetcar Named Desire in 1948, also winning for The Gin Game and Foxfire. Her films included The Birds, Cocoon, Batteries Not Included, Fried Green Tomatoes, and Nobody's Fool. At 80, she became the oldest actress to win the Academy Award for Best Actress for Driving Miss Daisy.

== Early life ==
The youngest of three siblings, Tandy was born in Geldeston Road in Hackney, London, to Harry Tandy and his wife, Jessie Helen Horspool. Her mother was from a large Fenland family in Wisbech, Cambridgeshire, and the head of a school for disabled children, and her father was a travelling salesman for a rope manufacturer. She was educated at Dame Alice Owen's School in Islington.

Her father died when she was 12, and her mother subsequently taught evening courses to earn an income. Her brother Edward was later a prisoner of war of the Japanese in Asia.

== Career ==
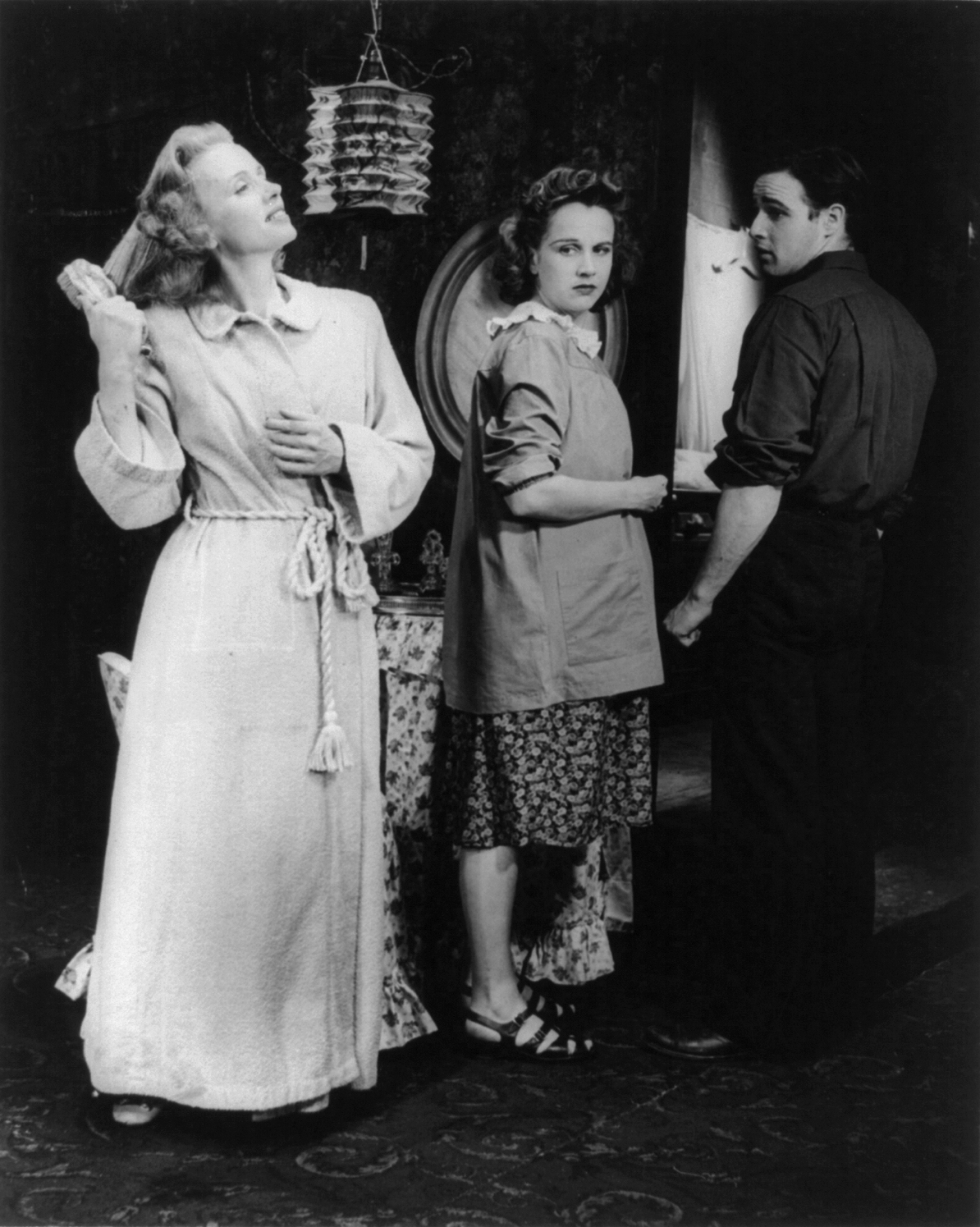
Tandy (left, with Kim Hunter and Marlon Brando) portrayed Blanche in the original 1947 Broadway production of A Streetcar Named Desire, a role that earned her the 1948 Tony Award for Best Actress.

Tandy was 18 years old when she made her professional debut on the London stage in 1927. During the 1930s, she acted in many plays in London's West End, playing Ophelia (opposite John Gielgud's legendary Hamlet) and Katherine (opposite Laurence Olivier's Henry V).

She entered films in Britain, but after her marriage to Jack Hawkins failed, she moved to the United States hoping to find better roles. During her time as a leading actress on the stage in London, she often had to fight over roles with her two rivals, Peggy Ashcroft and Celia Johnson. In the following years, she played supporting roles in several Hollywood films.

Like many stage actors, Tandy also worked in radio. Among other programs, she was a regular on Mandrake the Magician (as Princess Narda), and then with her second husband Hume Cronyn in The Marriage which ran on radio from 1953 to 1954, and then segued onto television.

She made her American film debut in The Seventh Cross (1944; appearing alongside Cronyn). She had supporting appearances in The Valley of Decision (1945), The Green Years (1946, as Cronyn's daughter), Dragonwyck (1946) starring Gene Tierney and Vincent Price and Forever Amber (1947). She appeared as the insomniac murderess in A Woman's Vengeance (1948), a film noir adapted by Aldous Huxley from his short story "The Gioconda Smile".

Over the next three decades, her film career continued sporadically while she found better roles on the stage. Her roles during this time included The Desert Fox: The Story of Rommel (1951) opposite James Mason, The Light in the Forest (1958), and a role as a domineering mother in Alfred Hitchcock's film The Birds (1963).

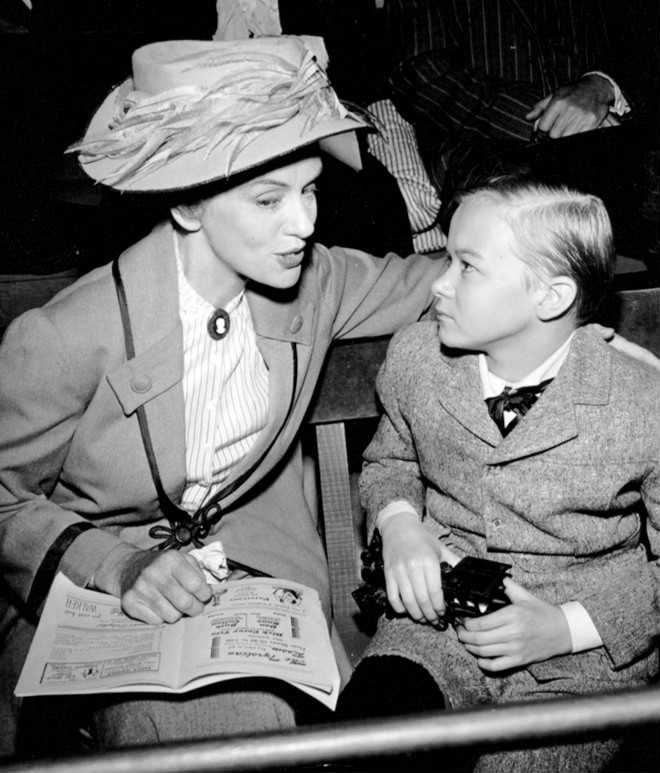
Tandy in Alfred Hitchcock Presents "The Glass Eye" (1957). with Paul Playdon

On Broadway, she won a Tony Award for her performance as Blanche Dubois in the original Broadway production of A Streetcar Named Desire in 1948. After this (she lost the film role to actress Vivien Leigh), she concentrated on the stage. In 1976, she and Cronyn joined the acting company of the Stratford Festival, and returned in 1980 to debut Cronyn's play Foxfire. In 1977, she earned her second Tony Award, for her performance (with Cronyn) in The Gin Game. The following year the production transferred to London's Lyric Theatre, where Tandy was nominated for the Laurence Olivier Award for Actress of the Year in a New Play. Her third Tony came in 1982 for her performance, again with Cronyn, in Foxfire. The next year, she read a speech from A Streetcar Named Desire at Tennessee Williams's memorial service.

The beginning of the 1980s saw a resurgence in her film career, with character roles in The World According to Garp (with Cronyn), Best Friends, Still of the Night (all 1982) and The Bostonians (1984). She and Cronyn were now working together more regularly on stage and television, including the films Honky Tonk Freeway (1981), Cocoon (1985), *batteries not included (1987), Cocoon: The Return (1988), and the Emmy Award winning television film Foxfire (1987, recreating her Tony winning Broadway role).

However, it was her colourful performance in Driving Miss Daisy (1989), as an aging, stubborn Southern Jewish matron, that earned her an Oscar.

She received a Best Supporting Actress nomination for her work in the grassroots hit Fried Green Tomatoes (1991) and co-starred in The Story Lady (1991 TV film, with her daughter Tandy Cronyn), Used People (1992, as Shirley MacLaine's mother), television film To Dance with the White Dog (1993, with Cronyn), and Camilla (1994, with Cronyn). Nobody's Fool (1994) proved to be her last performance, at the age of 84.

== Personal life and death ==
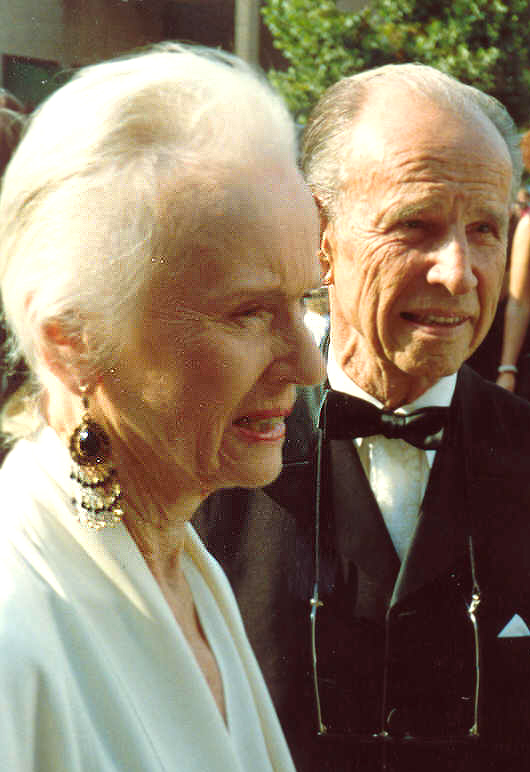
Tandy and Hume Cronyn, 1988

In 1932, Tandy married English actor Jack Hawkins and together they had a daughter, Susan Hawkins, who herself became an actress.

Tandy and Hawkins divorced in 1940. She married Canadian actor Hume Cronyn in 1942. Prior to moving to Connecticut, she and Cronyn lived for many years in nearby Pound Ridge, New York, and they remained together until her death in 1994. They had two children, daughter Tandy Cronyn, an actress who co-starred with her mother in the TV film The Story Lady, and son Christopher Cronyn. Tandy became a naturalised citizen of the US in 1952.

Tandy and her husband Cronyn co-starred in the 1987 film Batteries Not Included.

In 1990, Tandy was diagnosed with ovarian cancer, and she also suffered from angina and glaucoma. Despite her illnesses and advancing age she continued working. On September 11, 1994, she died at home in Easton, Connecticut, at the age of 85.

== Work ==
=== US stage credits ===
| Year | Title | Role | Notes |
|---|---|---|---|
| 1930 | The Matriarch | Toni Rakonitz | |
| 1930 | The Last Enemy | Cynthia Perry | |
| 1938 | Time and the Conways | Kay | |
| 1939 | The White Steed | Nora Fintry | |
| 1940 | Geneva | Deaconess | |
| 1940 | Jupiter Laughs | Dr. Mary Murray | |
| 1941 | Anne of England | Abigail Hill | |
| 1942 | Yesterday's Magic | Daughter Cattrin | |
| 1947 | A Streetcar Named Desire | Blanche DuBois | Tony Award for Best Actress in a Play |
| 1950 | Hilda Crane | Hilda Crane | |
| 1951 | Madam, Will You Walk | Mary Doyle | |
| 1951 | The Fourposter | Agnes | |
| 1955 | The Man in the Dog Suit | Martha Walling | |
| 1955 | The Honeys | Mary | |
| 1959 | Triple Play | In Bedtime Story: Angela Nightingale; In Portrait of a Madonna: Miss Lucretia Collins; In A Pound on Demand: The Public | |
| 1959 | Five Finger Exercise | Louise Harrington | Drama League Award for Distinguished Performance |
| 1964 | The Physicists | Fraulein Doktor Mathilde von Zahnd | |
| 1966 | A Delicate Balance | Agnes | |
| 1970 | Camino Real | Marguerite Gautier | |
| 1970 | Home | Marjorie | |
| 1971 | All Over | The Wife | |
| 1972 | Not I | Mouth | Obie Award for Best Actress |
| 1974 | Noël Coward in Two Keys | In A Song at Twilight: Hilde Latymer; In Come Into the Garden, Maud: Anna Mary Conklin | |
| 1977 | The Gin Game | Fonsia Dorsey | Tony Award for Best Actress in a Play; Drama Desk Award for Outstanding Actress in a Play |
| 1981 | Rose | Mother | Nominated—Tony Award for Best Featured Actress in a Play; Nominated—Drama Desk Award for Outstanding Featured Actress in a Play |
| 1982 | Foxfire | Annie Nations | Tony Award for Best Actress in a Play; Drama Desk Award for Outstanding Actress in a Play |
| 1983 | The Glass Menagerie | Amanda Wingfield | |
| 1986 | The Petition | Lady Elizabeth Milne | Nominated—Tony Award for Best Actress in a Play |

=== Film ===
| Year | Title | Role | Notes |
|---|---|---|---|
| 1932 | The Indiscretions of Eve | Maid | |
| 1938 | Murder in the Family | Ann Osborne | |
| 1944 | The Seventh Cross | Liesel Roeder | |
| 1944 | Blonde Fever | Diner at Inn | Uncredited |
| 1945 | The Valley of Decision | Louise Kane | |
| 1946 | The Green Years | Kate Leckie | |
| 1946 | Dragonwyck | Peggy O'Malley | |
| 1947 | Forever Amber | Nan Britton | |
| 1948 | A Woman's Vengeance | Janet Spence | |
| 1950 | September Affair | Catherine Lawrence | |
| 1951 | The Desert Fox: The Story of Rommel | Frau Lucie Maria Rommel | |
| 1958 | The Light in the Forest | Myra Butler | |
| 1962 | Hemingway's Adventures of a Young Man | Helen Adams | Nominated—Golden Globe Award for Best Supporting Actress – Motion Picture |
| 1963 | The Birds | Lydia Brenner | |
| 1976 | Butley | Edna Shaft | |
| 1981 | Honky Tonk Freeway | Carol | |
| 1982 | The World According to Garp | Mrs. Fields | |
| 1982 | Still of the Night | Grace Rice | |
| 1982 | Best Friends | Eleanor McCullen | |
| 1984 | The Bostonians | Miss Birdseye | |
| 1984 | Terror in the Aisles | Herself | Archival footage |
| 1985 | Cocoon | Alma Finley | Nominated—Saturn Award for Best Actress |
| 1987 | Batteries Not Included | Faye Riley | Saturn Award for Best Actress |
| 1988 | The House on Carroll Street | Miss Venable | |
| 1988 | Cocoon: The Return | Alma Finley | Nominated—Saturn Award for Best Actress |
| 1989 | Driving Miss Daisy | Daisy Werthan | Academy Award for Best Actress; BAFTA Award for Best Actress in a Leading Role; Boston Society of Film Critics Award for Best Actress; David di Donatello Award for Best Foreign Actress; Golden Globe Award for Best Actress – Motion Picture Musical or Comedy; Kansas City Film Critics Circle Award for Best Actress; Silver Bear for the Best Joint Performance (with Morgan Freeman); Nominated—American Comedy Award for Funniest Actress in a Motion Picture; Nominated—National Society of Film Critics Award for Best Actress; Nominated—New York Film Critics Circle Award for Best Actress |
| 1991 | Fried Green Tomatoes | Ninny Threadgoode | Nominated—Academy Award for Best Supporting Actress; Nominated—American Comedy Award for Funniest Supporting Actress in a Motion Picture; Nominated—BAFTA Award for Best Actress in a Leading Role; Nominated—Golden Globe Award for Best Supporting Actress – Motion Picture |
| 1992 | Used People | Freida | |
| 1994 | A Century of Cinema | Herself | Documentary |
| 1994 | Camilla | Camilla Cara | Released posthumously |
| 1994 | Nobody's Fool | Beryl Peoples | Released posthumously (final film role) |

=== Television ===
| Year | Title | Role | Notes |
|---|---|---|---|
| 1948 | Actors Studio | Miss Lucretia Collins | Episode: "Portrait of a Madonna" |
| 1950 | Masterpiece Playhouse | Hedda | Episode: "Hedda Gabler" |
| 1951 | Lights Out | | Episode: "Bird of Time" |
| 1951 | Somerset Maugham TV Theatre | | Episode: "The Man from Glasgow" |
| 1951 | Prudential Family Playhouse | Jane Crosby | Episode: "Icebound" |
| 1951 | Betty Crocker Star Matinee | | Episode: "The Weak Spot" |
| 1951–1957 | Studio One | Various | 2 episodes |
| 1953–1956 | Omnibus | Various | 5 episodes |
| 1954 | The Marriage | Liz Marriott | 8 episodes |
| 1955 | Producers' Showcase | Agnes | Episode: "The Fourposter"; Nominated—Primetime Emmy Award for Outstanding Lead Actress in a Miniseries or a Movie |
| 1955 | The Philco Television Playhouse | Liz Marriott | Episode: "Christmas 'til Closing" |
| 1955–1956 | Goodyear Television Playhouse | Various | 2 episodes |
| 1956 | The United States Steel Hour | Alice Wiggims | Episode: "The Great Adventure" |
| 1956 | Star Stage | | Episode: "The School Mistress" |
| 1956 | The Alcoa Hour | Olivia Crummit | Episode: "The Confidence Man" |
| 1956 | General Electric Theater | Laura Whitemore | Episode: "The Pot of Gold" |
| 1956 | Alfred Hitchcock Presents | Edwina Freel | Season 2 Episode 6: "Toby" |
| 1957 | Alfred Hitchcock Presents | Julia Lester | Season 3 Episode 1: "The Glass Eye" |
| 1957 | Studio 57 | Miss Bedford | Episode: "Little Miss Bedford" |
| 1957 | Suspicion | | Episode: "Murder Me Gently" |
| 1957–1958 | Schlitz Playhouse of Stars | Various | 2 episodes |
| 1958 | Alfred Hitchcock Presents | Laura Bowlby | Season 3 Episode 37: "The Canary Sedan" |
| 1958 | Telephone Time | Bertha Kinsky | Episode: "War Against War" |
| 1959 | The Ed Sullivan Show | The Public | Episode #12.34 |
| 1959 | DuPont Show of the Month | Mrs. Baines | Episode: "The Fallen Idol" |
| 1959 | The Moon and Sixpence | Blanche Stroeve | Television movie |
| 1964 | Breaking Point | Roberta Duncan | Episode: "Glass Flowers Never Drop Petals" |
| 1968 | Judd, for the Defense | Helen Wister | Episode: "Punishments, Cruel and Unusual" |
| 1972 | O'Hara, U.S. Treasury | Genevieve | Episode: "Operation: Dorias" |
| 1972 | The F.B.I. | Ardyth Nolan | Episode: "The Set-Up" |
| 1972 | Norman Corwin Presents | | Episode: "A Foreign Field" |
| 1975 | Bicentennial Minutes | Herself | Episode #1.424 |
| 1981 | The Gin Game | Fonsia Dorsey | Television movie |
| 1987 | Foxfire | Annie Nations | Television movie Primetime Emmy Award for Outstanding Lead Actress in a Miniseries or a Movie |
| 1991 | The Story Lady† | Grace McQueen | Television movie Nominated—Golden Globe Award for Best Actress – Miniseries or Television Film |
| 1993 | To Dance with the White Dog | Cora Peek | Television movie Nominated—Primetime Emmy Award for Outstanding Lead Actress in a Miniseries or a Movie |

†Re-issued on DVD as The Christmas Story Lady

=== Sound recordings ===
Tandy played Amanda in the Caedmon Records production of The Glass Menagerie and Madame Ranevskaya in Caedmon's The Cherry Orchard, and is featured in the Caedmon Heartbreak House. She can also be heard, along with other members of the original Broadway cast, performing excerpts from A Streetcar Named Desire on the WOR New York Drama Critics' Circle Award broadcast.

== Other awards ==
Tandy was chosen by People magazine as one of the 50 Most Beautiful People in the world in 1990.

- 1960 – Hollywood Walk of Fame at 6200 Hollywood Boulevard for Motion Picture Contributions.
- 1979 – Induction into the American Theatre Hall of Fame
- 1979 – Sarah Siddons Award Chicago theatre
- 1986 – Drama Desk Special Award
- 1986 – Kennedy Center Honors Recipient
- 1990 – National Medal of Arts
- 1991 – Women in Film Crystal Award
- 1994 – Special Tony Award for Lifetime Achievement shared with her husband, Hume Cronyn

== See also ==
- List of Academy Award winners and nominees from Great Britain
- List of actors with Academy Award nominations
- List of actors with more than one Academy Award nomination in the acting categories
- List of oldest and youngest Academy Award winners and nominees — Oldest winners for Best Lead Actress
- List of Golden Globe winners
- List of Primetime Emmy Award winners
