= Gault (surname) =

Notable people with the surname Gault are:

In politics

- Andrew Hamilton Gault (1882–1958), Canadian army officer and MP in the UK parliament
- Daniel Gault (1842–1912), Oregon politician
- Matthew Hamilton Gault (1822–1887), Canadian politician

In sport

- David Gault (born 1976), Australian footballer
- Don Gault (born 1946), American football player
- Ernie Gault (1889–1980), English footballer
- Georges Gault, French tennis player
- Michael Gault (born 1983), Northern Ireland football player
- Mick Gault, English competitive shooter
- Willie Gault (born 1960), American football player

In other fields

- Alma Elizabeth Gault (1891–1981), American nursing administrator
- Annabel Gault (born 1952), British artist
- Andrew Frederick Gault (1833–1903), Ulster-born Canadian merchant, industrialist, and philanthropist
- Benjamin True Gault (1858–1942), American ornithologist and bird conservationist
- Henri Gault (1929–2000), co-founder of Gault Millau restaurant guides
- Sir James Frederick Gault (1902–1977), British brigadier and military assistant to General Dwight Eisenhower
- John Gault, American entrepreneur and inventor
- Steven Gault, Canadian biker and police informer
- Stanley Gault (born 1926), CEO of Rubbermaid
- Thomas Gault (1938–2015), New Zealand judge
- William Campbell Gault (1910–1995), American novelist

Fictional people

- Lucy Gault, principal character in William Trevor's novel The Story of Lucy Gault
- Captain Gault, an English sea captain in stories by William Hope Hodgson
- Captain Gault, one of the Characters of Lost
