= By-elections to the 3rd Canadian Parliament =

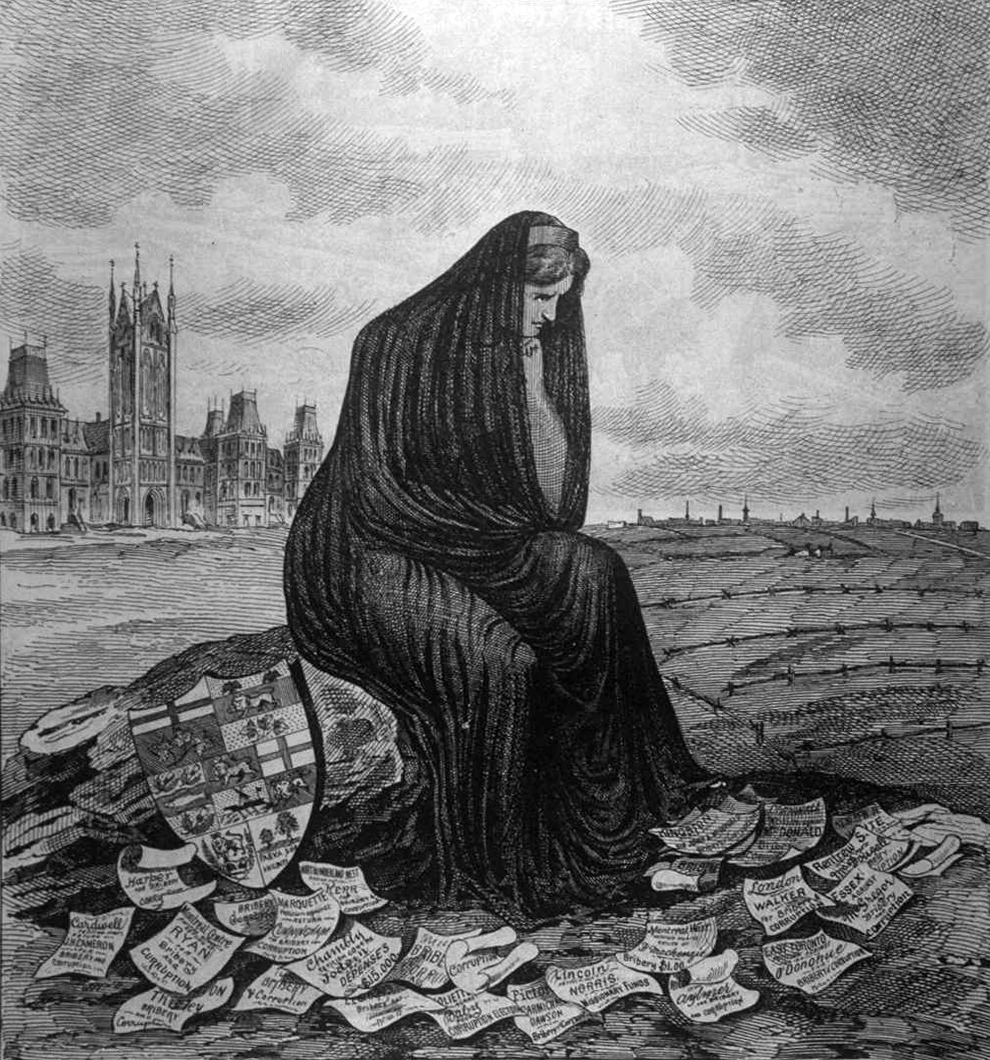
Editorial cartoon from Quebec's L'opinion publique in 1874: "A Country's Remorse". The accompanying text says, "Canada mourns her sins; she is right, remorse is healthy; all these electoral court challenges have revealed a series of facts which, in the eyes of the foreigner, demeans and humiliates Canada. Hope for a better future."

By-elections to the 3rd Canadian Parliament were held to elect members of the House of Commons of Canada between the 1874 federal election and the 1878 federal election. The Liberal Party of Canada led a majority government for the 3rd Canadian Parliament.

The number of by-elections is notable and so is the number that were successfully contested, mainly because courts in Canada began to take a more objective view of petitions at that time, following legal reforms on election procedure. Despite many new elections being called, many politicians were nonetheless reelected a second time.

The following list includes Ministerial by-elections which occurred due to the requirement that Members of Parliament recontest their seats upon being appointed to Cabinet. These by-elections were almost always uncontested. This requirement was abolished in 1931.

By-election	Date	Incumbent	Party	Winner	Party	Cause	Retained
New Westminster	March 25, 1878	James Cunningham	Liberal	Thomas Robert McInnes	Independent	Resignation	No
Northumberland	February 5, 1878	Peter Mitchell	Independent	Peter Mitchell	Independent	Resignation to re-contest after being accused of violating the Independence of Parliament Act by leasing a building to the government while he was a senator.	Yes
Halifax	January 29, 1878	Alfred Gilpin Jones	Independent	Alfred Gilpin Jones	Independent	Resignation to re-contest because of an alleged breach of the Independence of Parliament Act.	Yes
Digby	January 19, 1878	William Berrian Vail	Liberal	John Chipman Wade	Conservative	Resignation to re-contest due to conflict of interest allegations.	No
Restigouche	January 12, 1878	George Moffat Sr.	Conservative	George Haddow	Independent	Resignation	No
Nicolet	December 18, 1877	Joseph Gaudet	Conservative	François-Xavier-Ovide Méthot	Independent Conservative	Appointed to the Legislative Council of Quebec	No
Quebec East	November 28, 1877	Isidore Thibaudeau	Liberal	Wilfrid Laurier	Liberal	Resignation to provide a seat for Laurier.	Yes
Quebec-Centre	November 3, 1877	Joseph-Édouard Cauchon	Conservative	Jacques Malouin	Independent	Appointed Lieutenant-Governor of Manitoba.	No
Drummond—Arthabaska	October 27, 1877	Wilfrid Laurier	Liberal	Désiré Olivier Bourbeau	Conservative	Recontested upon appointment as Minister of Inland Revenue.	No
Gloucester	July 2, 1877	Timothy Anglin	Liberal	Timothy Anglin	Liberal	Resignation to re-contest after being found in violation of the Independence of Parliament Act for accepting government printing contracts, and being censured by the House of Commons Committee on Privilege.	Yes
Ottawa (City of)	May 9, 1877	Joseph Merrill Currier	Liberal-Conservative	Joseph Merrill Currier	Liberal-Conservative	Resignation to re-contest for having infringed the Independence of Parliament Act by conducting business dealings with the government while still a member.	Yes
Lincoln	May 9, 1877	James Norris	Liberal	James Norris	Liberal	Resigns in order to re-contest after acquiring a government contract.	Yes
Charlevoix	March 23, 1877	Hector-Louis Langevin	Conservative	Hector-Louis Langevin	Conservative	Election declared void.	Yes
Kamouraska	February 19, 1877	Charles Alphonse Pantaléon Pelletier	Liberal	Charles-François Roy	Conservative	Called to the Senate.	No
Jacques Cartier	December 28, 1876	Rodolphe Laflamme	Liberal	Rodolphe Laflamme	Liberal	Recontested upon appointment as Minister of Inland Revenue.	Yes
Cardwell	December 14, 1876	John Hillyard Cameron	Conservative	Dalton McCarthy	Conservative	Death	Yes
Queen's County	November 22, 1876	David Laird	Liberal	James Colledge Pope	Conservative	Appointed Lieutenant-Governor of the North West Territories.	No
Bothwell	November 15, 1876	David Mills	Liberal	David Mills	Liberal	Recontested upon appointment as Minister of the Interior and Superintendent General of Indian Affairs.	Yes
Beauce	October 18, 1876	Christian Henry Pozer	Liberal	Joseph Bolduc	Conservative	Called to the Senate.	No
Victoria	September 21, 1876	Barclay Edmund Tremaine	Liberal	Charles James Campbell	Conservative	Appointed a County Court judge.	No
Glengarry	July 31, 1876	Archibald McNab	Liberal	Archibald McNab	Liberal	Election declared void.	Yes
Ontario South	July 5, 1876	Malcolm Cameron	Liberal	Thomas Nicholson Gibbs	Liberal-Conservative	Death	No
Ontario North	July 5, 1876	Adam Gordon	Liberal	William Henry Gibbs	Conservative	Death	No
Wellington South	July 5, 1876	David Stirton	Liberal	Donald Guthrie	Liberal	Appointed Postmaster of Guelph.	Yes
Middlesex North	June 7, 1876	Thomas Scatcherd	Liberal	Robert Colin Scatcherd	Liberal	Death	Yes.
Two Mountains	March 11, 1876	Charles Auguste Maximilien Globensky	Independent	Jean-Baptiste Daoust	Conservative	Resignation	No
Charlevoix	January 22, 1876	Pierre-Alexis Tremblay	Liberal	Hector-Louis Langevin	Conservative	Election declared void.	No
Renfrew North	January 21, 1876	William Murray	Liberal	Peter White	Conservative	Election declared void.	No
Chambly	January 7, 1876	Amable Jodoin	Liberal	Pierre Basile Benoit	Conservative	Election declared void.	No
Argenteuil	December 31, 1875	Lemuel Cushing, Jr.	Liberal	Thomas Christie	Liberal	Election declared void.	Yes
Quebec-Centre	December 27, 1875	Joseph-Édouard Cauchon	Conservative	Joseph-Édouard Cauchon	Conservative	Recontested upon appointment as President of the Privy Council.	Yes
Dorchester	December 14, 1875	François Fortunat Rouleau	Liberal-Conservative	François Fortunat Rouleau	Liberal-Conservative	Election declared void.	Yes
Montreal Centre	November 26, 1875	Bernard Devlin	Liberal	Bernard Devlin	Liberal	Election declared void.	Yes
Bellechasse	November 23, 1875	Télesphore Fournier	Liberal	Joseph Goderic Blanchet	Conservative	Appointed to the Supreme Court of Canada.	No
West Toronto	November 6, 1875	Thomas Moss	Liberal	John Beverly Robinson	Conservative	Appointed to the Court of Appeal of Ontario	No
Montreal West	October 30, 1875	Frederick Mackenzie	Liberal	Thomas Workman	Liberal	Election declared void.	Yes
Victoria North	September 17, 1875	James Maclennan	Liberal	Hector Cameron	Conservative	Court overturns result of 1874 by-election and declared Cameron seated.	No
Gaspé	July 10, 1875	Louis George Harper	Conservative	John Short	Conservative	Election declared void.	Yes
Glengarry	July 7, 1875	Donald Alexander Macdonald	Liberal	Archibald McNab	Liberal	Appointed Lieutenant-Governor of Ontario.	Yes
Perth North	July 7, 1875	Andrew Monteith	Conservative	Andrew Monteith	Conservative	Election declared void.	Yes
York North	June 29, 1875	Alfred Hutchinson Dymond	Liberal	Alfred Hutchinson Dymond	Liberal	Election declared void.	Yes
Monck	June 22, 1875	Lachlin McCallum	Liberal-Conservative	Lachlin McCallum	Liberal-Conservative	Election declared void.	Yes
Napierville	June 19, 1875	Sixte Coupal dit la Reine	Liberal	Sixte Coupal dit la Reine	Liberal	Election declared void.	Yes
Bruce South	June 2, 1875	Edward Blake	Liberal	Edward Blake	Liberal	Recontested upon appointment as Minister of Justice.	Yes
Toronto Centre	May 21, 1875	Robert Wilkes	Liberal	John Macdonald	Liberal	Election declared void.	Yes
Hamilton	May 20, 1875	Andrew Trew Wood and Aemilius Irving	Liberal	Aemilius Irving and Andrew Trew Wood	Liberal	Double member constituency - elections declared void.	Yes
Victoria	April 28, 1875	Charles James Campbell	Conservative	Barclay Edmund Tremaine	Liberal	Campbell unseated by decision of the Supreme Court of Nova Scotia., 28 February 1875; Tremaine declared duly elected by decision of Election Court, 28 April 1875	No
Provencher	March 31, 1875	Louis Riel	Independent	Andrew Bannatyne	Liberal	Unseated from the House of Commons and declared an outlaw, 25 February 1875	No
Wellington North	March 18, 1875	Nathaniel Higinbotham	Liberal	Nathaniel Higinbotham	Liberal	Election declared void.	Yes
Berthier	February 27, 1875	Anselme-Homère Pâquet	Liberal	Edward Octavian Cuthbert	Conservative	Called to the Senate.	No
Two Mountains	February 26, 1875	Wilfrid Prévost	Liberal	Charles Auguste Maximilien Globensky	Independent	Election declared void	No
Renfrew South	February 20, 1875	John Lorn McDougall	Liberal	John Lorn McDougall	Liberal	Election declared void.	Yes
London	February 18, 1875	John Walker	Liberal	James Harshaw Fraser	Liberal-Conservative	Election declared void	No
Huron South	February 11, 1875	Malcolm Colin Cameron	Liberal	Thomas Greenway	Independent	Election declared void.	No
Middlesex East	January 28, 1875	Crowell Willson	Liberal-Conservative	Duncan Macmillan	Liberal-Conservative	Election declared void.	Yes
Halton	January 25, 1875	Daniel Black Chisholm	Liberal-Conservative	William McCraney	Liberal	Election declared void.	No
Toronto East	January 18, 1875	John O'Donohoe	Liberal-Conservative	Samuel Platt	Independent	Election declared void.	No
L'Assomption	January 16, 1875	Hilaire Hurteau	Liberal-Conservative	Hilaire Hurteau	Liberal-Conservative	Election declared void.	Yes
Montreal Centre	January 12, 1875	Michael Patrick Ryan	Liberal-Conservative	Bernard Devlin	Liberal	Election declared void.	No
Chambly	December 30, 1874	Pierre Basile Benoit	Conservative	Amable Jodoin	Liberal	Election declared void.	No
Kingston	December 29, 1874	John A. Macdonald	Liberal-Conservative	John A. Macdonald	Liberal-Conservative	Election declared void.	Yes
Simcoe North	December 26, 1874	Herman Henry Cook	Liberal	Herman Henry Cook	Liberal	Election declared void.	Yes
Victoria North	December 22, 1874	James Maclennan	Liberal	James Maclennan	Liberal	Election declared void.	Yes
Niagara	December 22, 1874	Josiah Burr Plumb	Conservative	Josiah Burr Plumb	Conservative	Election declared void.	Yes
Victoria	December 17, 1874	William Ross	Liberal	Charles James Campbell	Conservative	Appointed to Collector of Customs at Halifax.	No
Colchester	December 17, 1874	Thomas McKay	Liberal-Conservative	Thomas McKay	Liberal-Conservative	Election declared void.	Yes
Leeds North and Grenville North	December 16, 1874	Charles Frederick Ferguson	Liberal-Conservative	Charles Frederick Ferguson	Liberal-Conservative	Election declared void.	Yes
Norfolk South	December 16, 1874	John Stuart	Liberal	William Wallace	Conservative	Election declared void.	No
Wellington Centre	December 13, 1874	George Turner Orton	Liberal-Conservative	George Turner Orton	Liberal-Conservative	Election declared void.	Yes
Northumberland East	December 12, 1874	James Lyons Biggar	Independent Liberal	James Lyons Biggar	Independent Liberal	Election declared void.	Yes
Joliette	December 10, 1874	Louis François Georges Baby	Conservative	Louis François Georges Baby	Conservative	Election declared void.	Yes
Montreal West	December 10, 1874	Frederick Mackenzie	Liberal	Frederick Mackenzie	Liberal	Election declared void.	Yes
Richmond—Wolfe	December 4, 1874	Henry Aylmer	Liberal	Henry Aylmer	Liberal	Election declared void.	Yes
Northumberland West	November 17, 1874	William Kerr	Liberal	William Kerr	Liberal	Election declared void.	Yes
Lincoln	November 17, 1874	James Norris	Liberal	James Norris	Liberal	Election declared void.	Yes
Argenteuil	November 4, 1874	John Abbott	Liberal-Conservative	Lemuel Cushing, Jr.	Liberal	Election declared void.	No
Renfrew North	November 4, 1874	Peter White	Conservative	William Murray	Liberal	Election declared void.	No
Addington	October 28, 1874	Schuyler Shibley	Conservative	Schuyler Shibley	Liberal-Conservative	Election declared void.	Yes
Digby	October 26, 1874	Edwin Randolph Oakes	Liberal-Conservative	William Berrian Vail	Liberal	Appointed to the Legislative Council of Nova Scotia.	No
Renfrew South	October 24, 1874	John Lorn McDougall	Liberal	John Lorn McDougall	Liberal	Election declared void.	Yes
Essex	October 22, 1874	William McGregor	Liberal	William McGregor	Liberal	Election declared void.	Yes
Cornwall	October 20, 1874	Alexander Francis Macdonald	Liberal	Alexander Francis Macdonald	Liberal	Election declared void.	Yes
Provencher	September 3, 1874	Louis Riel	Independent	Louis Riel	Independent	Expelled from the House of Commons	Yes
Marquette	August 25, 1874	Robert Cunningham	Liberal	Joseph O'Connell Ryan	Liberal	Death, Ryan awarded seat upon re-examination of votes cast.	Yes
Elgin East	August 11, 1874	William Harvey	Liberal	Colin MacDougall	Liberal	Death	Yes
Napierville	August 4, 1874	Antoine-Aimé Dorion	Liberal	Sixte Coupal dit la Reine	Liberal	Appointed Chief Justice of Quebec.	Yes
Verchères	July 25, 1874	Félix Geoffrion	Liberal	Félix Geoffrion	Liberal	Recontested upon appointment as Minister of Inland Revenue.	Yes
Oxford South	May 23, 1874	Ebenezer Vining Bodwell	Liberal	James Atchison Skinner	Liberal	Appointed Superintendent of the Welland Canal.	Yes
Durham West	April 7, 1874	Edmund B. Wood	Liberal	Harvey William Burk	Liberal	Appointed Chief Justice of Manitoba.	Yes

== See also ==
- List of federal by-elections in Canada
