= 3rd Canadian Parliament =

1874–78 national legislative term

- Majority parliament
- Feb. 21, 1874 – Aug. 16, 1878

Parliament leaders
- Prime minister: Hon. Alexander Mackenzie; Nov. 7, 1873 – Oct. 8, 1878
- Cabinet: 2nd Canadian Ministry
- Leader of the Opposition: Sir John A. Macdonald; Nov. 6, 1873 – Oct. 16, 1878

Party caucuses
- Government: Liberal Party
- Opposition: Conservative Party & Liberal-Conservative

House of Commons
- Seating arrangements of the House of Commons
- Speaker of the Commons: Timothy Warren Anglin; March 26, 1874 – February 12, 1879
- Members: 206 seats MP seats List of members

Senate
- Speaker of the Senate: The Hon. David Christie; January 9, 1874 – October 16, 1878
- Government Senate leader: Luc Letellier de St-Just; November 5, 1873 – December 14, 1876
- Sir Richard William Scott; December 14, 1876 – October 7, 1878
- Opposition Senate leader: Alexander Campbell; November 7, 1873 – October 8, 1878
- Senators: 92 seats senator seats List of senators

Sovereign
- Monarch: Victoria; 1 July 1867 – 22 Jan. 1901
- Governor general: The Earl of Dufferin; 25 June 1872 – 25 Nov. 1878

Sessions
- 1st session March 26, 1874 – May 26, 1874
- 2nd session February 4, 1875 – April 8, 1875
- 3rd session February 10, 1876 – April 12, 1876
- 4th session February 8, 1877 – April 28, 1877
- 5th session February 7, 1878 – May 10, 1878
← 2nd	→ 4th

The 3rd Canadian Parliament was in session from March 26, 1874, until August 17, 1878 (4 years and 144 days). The membership was set by the 1874 federal election on January 22, 1874. It was dissolved prior to the 1878 election.

It was controlled by a Liberal Party majority under Prime Minister Alexander Mackenzie and the 2nd Canadian Ministry. The Official Opposition was the Conservative/Liberal-Conservative, first led by Sir John A. Macdonald.

The Speaker was Timothy Warren Anglin. See also List of Canadian electoral districts 1873-1882 for a list of the ridings in this parliament.

There were five sessions of the 3rd Parliament:

Session	Start	End
1st	March 26, 1874	May 26, 1874
2nd	February 4, 1875	April 8, 1875
3rd	February 10, 1876	April 12, 1876
4th	February 8, 1877	April 28, 1877
5th	February 7, 1878	May 10, 1878

== List of members ==
Following is a full list of members of the third parliament listed first by province, then by electoral district.

Key:

- Party leaders are italicized.
- Cabinet ministers are in **boldface**.
- The Prime Minister is **both**.
- The Speaker is indicated by "(†)".

Electoral districts denoted by an asterisk (*) indicates that district was represented by two members.

=== British Columbia ===
Electoral district	Name	Party	First elected/previously elected	No. of terms
Cariboo	Joshua Spencer Thompson	Liberal-Conservative	1871	3rd term
New Westminster	James Cunningham	Liberal	1874	1st term
New Westminster	Thomas Robert McInnes (from March 25, 1878)	Independent	1878	1st term
Vancouver	Arthur Bunster	Liberal	1874	1st term
Victoria	Francis James Roscoe	Independent Liberal	1874	1st term
Victoria	Amor De Cosmos	Liberal	1871	3rd term
Yale	Edgar Dewdney	Conservative	1872	2nd term

=== Manitoba ===
Electoral district	Name	Party	First elected/previously elected	No. of terms
Lisgar	John Christian Schultz	Conservative	1871	3rd term
Marquette	Robert Cunningham (died 4 July 1874)	Liberal	1872	2nd term
Marquette	Joseph O'Connell Ryan (from August 25, 1874)	Liberal	1874	1st term
Provencher	Louis Riel (expelled from the House of Commons, reelected, reexpelled and banished from Canada)	Independent	1873	2nd term
Provencher	Andrew Bannatyne (from March 31, 1875)	Liberal	1875	1st term
Selkirk	Donald A. Smith	Independent Conservative	1871	3rd term

One MP recontested his seat in a byelection, and was reelected.

- **Louis Riel** was reelected in Provencher on September 3, 1874, upon the passage of a motion expelling him from the House of Commons.

=== New Brunswick ===
Electoral district	Name	Party	First elected/previously elected	No. of terms
Albert	John Wallace	Liberal	1867	3rd term
Carleton	Stephen Burpee Appleby	Liberal	1872	2nd term
Charlotte	Arthur Hill Gillmor	Liberal	1874	1st term
City and County of St. John	**Isaac Burpee**	Liberal	1872	2nd term
City and County of St. John	Acalus Lockwood Palmer	Liberal	1872	2nd term
City of St. John	Jeremiah Smith Boies De Veber	Liberal	1873	2nd term
Gloucester	Timothy Warren Anglin (†)	Liberal	1867	3rd term
Kent	George McLeod	Independent	1874	1st term
King's	James Domville	Conservative	1872	2nd term
Northumberland	Peter Mitchell	Independent	1872	2nd term
Queen's	John Ferris	Liberal	1867	3rd term
Restigouche	George Moffat	Conservative	1870	3rd term
Restigouche	George Haddow (from January 12, 1878)	Independent	1878	1st term
Sunbury	Charles Burpee	Liberal	1867	3rd term
Victoria	John Costigan	Liberal-Conservative	1867	3rd term
Westmorland	**Albert James Smith**	Liberal	1867	3rd term
York	John Pickard	Independent Liberal	1868	3rd term

Two MPs recontested their seats in a byelection, and were reelected:

- **Timothy Warren Anglin** was reelected in Gloucester on July 2, 1877.
- **Peter Mitchell** was reelected in Northumberland on February 5, 1878.

=== Nova Scotia ===
Electoral district	Name	Party	First elected/previously elected	No. of terms
Annapolis	William Hallett Ray	Liberal	1867	3rd term
Antigonish	Angus McIsaac	Liberal	1873	2nd term
Cape Breton	Newton LeGayet Mackay	Liberal	1872	2nd term
Cape Breton	William McDonald	Conservative	1872	2nd term
Colchester	Thomas McKay	Liberal-Conservative	1874	1st term
Cumberland	Charles Tupper	Conservative	1867	3rd term
Digby	Edwin Randolph Oakes	Liberal-Conservative	1874	1st term
Digby	**William Berrian Vail** (from October 26, 1874)	Liberal	1874	1st term
Digby	John Chipman Wade (from January 29, 1878)	Independent	1878	1st term
Guysborough	John Angus Kirk	Liberal	1874	1st term
Halifax	**Alfred Gilpin Jones**	Independent	1867, 1874	2nd term*
Halifax	Patrick Power	Independent Liberal	1867, 1874	2nd term*
Hants	Monson Henry Goudge	Liberal	1873	2nd term
Inverness	Samuel McDonnell	Liberal	1872	2nd term
Kings	Frederick William Borden	Liberal	1874	1st term
Lunenburg	Charles Edward Church	Liberal	1872	2nd term
Pictou*	James William Carmichael	Liberal	1867, 1874	2nd term*
Pictou*	John A. Dawson	Liberal	1874	1st term
Queens	James Fraser Forbes	Liberal	1867	3rd term
Richmond	Edmund Power Flynn	Liberal	1874	1st term
Shelburne	**Thomas Coffin**	Liberal	1867	3rd term
Victoria	**William Ross**	Liberal	1867	3rd term
Victoria	Charles James Campbell (from December 17, 1874)	Conservative	1874	1st term
Victoria	Barclay Edmund Tremaine (from April 28, 1875)	Liberal	1875	1st term
Victoria	Charles James Campbell (from September 21, 1876)	Conservative	1876	1st term
Yarmouth	Frank Killam	Liberal	1868	3rd term

Two MPs recontested their seats in byelections, and were reelected.

- **Thomas McKay** was reelected in Colchester on December 17, 1874
- **Alfred Gilpin Jones** was reelected in Halifax on January 29, 1878, on being named Minister of Militia and Defence.

=== Ontario ===
Electoral district	Name	Party	First elected/previously elected	No. of terms
Addington	Schuyler Shibley	Liberal-Conservative	1872	2nd term
Algoma	Edward Borron	Liberal	1874	1st term
Bothwell	**David Mills**	Liberal	1867	3rd term
Brant North	Gavin Fleming	Liberal	1872	2nd term
Brant South	William Paterson	Liberal	1872	2nd term
Brockville	Jacob Dockstader Buell	Liberal	1872	2nd term
Bruce North	John Gillies	Liberal	1872	2nd term
Bruce South	**Edward Blake**	Liberal	1872	2nd term
Cardwell	John Hillyard Cameron	Conservative	1867	3rd term
Cardwell	Dalton McCarthy (from December 14, 1876)	Liberal-Conservative	1876	1st term
Carleton	John Rochester	Conservative	1872	2nd term
Cornwall	Alexander Francis Macdonald	Liberal	1874	1st term
Dundas	William Gibson	Independent Liberal	1872	2nd term
Durham East	Lewis Ross	Liberal Reformer	1872	2nd term
Durham West	Edmund Burke Wood	Liberal	1867	3rd term
Durham West	Harvey William Burk (from April 7, 1874)	Liberal	1874	1st term
Elgin East	William Harvey	Liberal	1872	2nd term
Elgin East	Colin MacDougall (from August 11, 1874)	Liberal	1874	1st term
Elgin West	George Elliott Casey	Liberal	1872	2nd term
Essex	William McGregor	Liberal	1874	1st term
Frontenac	George Airey Kirkpatrick	Conservative	1870	3rd term
Glengarry	**Donald Alexander MacDonald**	Liberal	1867	3rd term
Glengarry	Archibald McNab (from July 7, 1875)	Liberal	1875	1st term
Grenville South	William Henry Brouse	Liberal	1872	2nd term
Grey East	William Kingston Flesher	Conservative	1872	2nd term
Grey North	George Snider	Liberal	1867	3rd term
Grey South	George Landerkin	Liberal	1872	2nd term
Haldimand	David Thompson	Liberal	1867	3rd term
Halton	Daniel Black Chisholm	Liberal-Conservative	1867	3rd term
Halton	William McCraney (from January 25, 1875)	Liberal	1875	1st term
Hamilton	Aemilius Irving	Liberal	1874	1st term
Hamilton	Andrew Trew Wood	Liberal	1874	1st term
Hastings East	John White	Conservative	1871	3rd term
Hastings North	Mackenzie Bowell	Conservative	1867	3rd term
Hastings West	James Brown	Conservative	1867	3rd term
Huron Centre	Horace Horton	Liberal	1872	2nd term
Huron North	Thomas Farrow	Liberal-Conservative	1867	3rd term
Huron South	Malcolm Colin Cameron (election overturned in 1875)	Liberal	1867	3rd term
Huron South	Thomas Greenway (from 1875)	Independent	1875	1st term
Kent	Rufus Stephenson	Conservative	1867	3rd term
Kingston	Sir John A. Macdonald	Liberal-Conservative	1867	3rd term
Lambton	**Alexander Mackenzie**	Liberal	1867	3rd term
Lanark North	Daniel Galbraith	Liberal	1872	2nd term
Lanark South	John Graham Haggart	Conservative	1872	2nd term
Leeds North and Grenville North	Charles Frederick Ferguson	Liberal-Conservative	1874	1st term
Leeds South	David Ford Jones	Conservative	1874	1st term
Lennox	**Richard John Cartwright**	Liberal	1867	3rd term
Lincoln	James Norris	Liberal	1874	1st term
London	John Walker	Liberal	1874	1st term
London	James Harshaw Fraser (from February 18, 1875)	Liberal-Conservative	1875	1st term
Middlesex East	Crowell Willson (election successfully contested 1874)	Liberal-Conservative	1874	1st term
Middlesex East	Duncan Macmillan (from January 28, 1875)	Liberal-Conservative	1875	1st term
Middlesex North	Thomas Scatcherd	Liberal	1867	3rd term
Middlesex North	Robert Colin Scatcherd (from June 7, 1876)	Liberal	1876	1st term
Middlesex West	George William Ross	Liberal	1872	2nd term
Monck	Lachlin McCallum	Liberal-Conservative	1874	1st term
Muskoka	Alexander Peter Cockburn	Liberal	1872	2nd term
Niagara	Josiah Burr Plumb	Conservative	1874	1st term
Norfolk North	John M. Charlton	Liberal	1872	2nd term
Norfolk South	John Stuart	Liberal	1874	1st term
Norfolk South	William Wallace (from December 16, 1874)	Conservative	1874	1st term
Northumberland East	James Lyons Biggar	Independent Liberal	1874	1st term
Northumberland West	William Kerr	Liberal	1874	1st term
Ontario North	Adam Gordon	Liberal	1874	1st term
Ontario North	William Henry Gibbs (from July 5, 1876)	Conservative	1874	1st term
Ontario South	Malcolm Cameron	Liberal Party of Canada	1874	1st term
Ontario South	Thomas Nicholson Gibbs (from July 5, 1876)	Liberal-Conservative	1876	1st term
Ottawa (City of)*	Pierre St. Jean	Liberal	1874	1st term
Ottawa (City of)*	Joseph Merrill Currier	Liberal-Conservative	1867	3rd term
Oxford North	Thomas Oliver	Liberal	1867	3rd term
Oxford South	Ebenezer Vining Bodwell (until April 1874 when he became superintendent of the Welland Canal)	Liberal	1867	3rd term
Oxford South	James Atchison Skinner (from May 23, 1874)	Liberal	1874	1st term
Peel	Robert Smith	Liberal	1872	2nd term
Perth North	Andrew Monteith	Conservative	1874	1st term
Perth South	James Trow	Liberal	1872	2nd term
Peterborough East	James Hall	Liberal	1874	1st term
Peterborough West	John Bertram	Liberal	1874	1st term
Prescott	Albert Hagar	Liberal	1867	3rd term
Prince Edward	Walter Ross	Liberal	1867	3rd term
Renfrew North	Peter White	Liberal-Conservative	1874	1st term
Renfrew North	William Murray (from November 4, 1874)	Liberal	1874	1st term
Renfrew North	Peter White (from January 21, 1876)	Liberal-Conservative	1876	1st term
Renfrew South	John Lorn McDougall	Liberal	1867, 1874	2nd term*
Russell	Robert Blackburn	Liberal	1874	1st term
Simcoe North	Hermon Henry Cook	Liberal	1872	2nd term
Simcoe South	William Carruthers Little	Liberal-Conservative	1867	3rd term
Stormont	Cyril Archibald	Liberal	1872	2nd term
Toronto Centre	Robert Wilkes	Liberal	1872	2nd term
Toronto Centre	John Macdonald (from May 21, 1875)	Independent Liberal	1875	1st term
Toronto East	John O'Donohoe	Liberal-Conservative	1874	1st term
Toronto East	Samuel Platt (from January 18, 1875)	Independent	1875	1st term
Victoria North	James Maclennan	Liberal	1874	1st term
Victoria North	Hector Cameron (from September 17, 1875)	Conservative	1875	1st term
Victoria South	Arthur McQuade	Conservative	1874	1st term
Waterloo North	Isaac Erb Bowman	Liberal	1867	3rd term
Waterloo South	James Young	Liberal	1867	3rd term
Welland	William Alexander Thomson	Liberal	1872	2nd term
Wellington Centre	George Turner Orton	Liberal-Conservative	1874	1st term
Wellington North	Nathaniel Higinbotham	Liberal	1872	2nd term
Wellington South	David Stirton	Liberal	1867	3rd term
Wellington South	Donald Guthrie (from July 5, 1876)	Liberal	1876	1st term
Wentworth North	Thomas Bain	Liberal	1872	2nd term
Wentworth South	Joseph Rymal	Liberal	1867	3rd term
West Toronto	Thomas Moss	Liberal	1873	2nd term
West Toronto	John Beverley Robinson (from November 6, 1875)	Conservative	1875	1st term
York East	James Metcalfe	Liberal	1867	3rd term
York North	Alfred Hutchinson Dymond	Liberal	1874	1st term
York West	David Blain	Liberal	1872	2nd term

22 MPs recontested their seats in byelections, and were reelected

- **William McGregor** was reelected in Essex on October 22, 1874.
- **John Lorn McDougall** was reelected in Renfrew South on October 24, 1874, and again on February 20, 1875.
- **Schuyler Shibley** was reelected in Addington on October 28, 1874.
- **William Kerr** was reelected in Northumberland West on November 17, 1874.
- **James Norris** was reelected in Lincoln on November 17, 1874, and May 9, 1877.
- **James Lyons Biggar** was reelected in Northumberland East on December 12, 1874.
- **George Turner Orton** was reelected in Wellington Centre on December 13, 1874.
- **Charles Frederick Ferguson** was reelected in Leeds North and Grenville North on December 16, 1874.
- **James MacLennan** was reelected in Victoria North on December 22, 1874.
- **Josiah Burr Plumb** was reelected in Niagara on December 22, 1874.
- **Herman Henry Cook** was reelected in Simcoe North on December 26, 1874.
- **Sir John A. Macdonald** was reelected in Kingston on December 29, 1874.
- **Nathaniel Higinbotham** was reelected in Wellington North on March 18, 1875.
- **Aemilius Irving** was reelected in Hamilton on May 20, 1875.
- **Andrew Trew Wood** was reelected in Hamilton on May 20, 1875.
- **Edward Blake** was reelected in Bruce South on June 2, 1875, after being named Minister of Justice.
- **Lachlan McCallum** was reelected in Monck on June 22, 1875.
- **Alfred Hutchison Dymond** was reelected in York North on June 29, 1875.
- **Andrew Monteith** was reelected in Perth North on July 7, 1875.
- **Archibald McNab** was reelected in Glengarry on July 31, 1876.
- **David Mills** was reelected in Bothwell on November 15, 1876, after being named Minister of the Interior.
- **Joseph Merrill Currier** was reelected in Ottawa on May 9, 1877.

=== Prince Edward Island ===
Electoral district	Name	Party	First elected/previously elected	No. of terms
King's County*	Daniel Davies	Conservative	1873	2nd term
King's County*	Peter Adolphus McIntyre	Liberal	1874	1st term
Prince County*	Stanislaus Francis Perry	Liberal	1874	1st term
Prince County*	James Yeo	Liberal	1873	2nd term
Queen's County*	**David Laird**	Liberal	1873	2nd term
Queen's County*	Peter Sinclair	Liberal	1873	2nd term
Queen's County*	James Colledge Pope (from November 22, 1876)	Conservative	1876	1st term

=== Quebec ===
Electoral district	Name	Party	First elected/previously elected	No. of terms
Argenteuil	John Abbott	Liberal-Conservative	1867	3rd term
Argenteuil	Lemuel Cushing (from November 4, 1874)	Liberal	1874	1st term
Argenteuil	Thomas Christie (from December 31, 1875)	Liberal	1875	1st term
Bagot	Joseph-Alfred Mousseau	Conservative	1874	1st term
Beauce	Christian Pozer	Liberal	1867	3rd term
Beauce	Joseph Bolduc (from October 18, 1876)	Conservative	1876	1st term
Beauharnois	Ulysse-Janvier Robillard	Independent Conservative	1872	2nd term
Bellechasse	**Télesphore Fournier**	Liberal	1870	3rd term
Bellechasse	Joseph-Goderic Blanchet (from November 23, 1875)	Conservative	1875	1st term
Berthier	Anselme Homère Pâquet	Liberal	1867	3rd term
Berthier	Edward Octavian Cuthbert (from February 27, 1875)	Conservative	1875	1st term
Bonaventure	Théodore Robitaille	Conservative	1867	3rd term
Brome	Nathaniel Pettes	Liberal	1874	1st term
Chambly	Amable Jodoin	Liberal	1874	1st term
Chambly	Pierre-Basile Benoit (from January 7, 1876)	Conservative	1876	1st term
Champlain	Hippolyte Montplaisir	Liberal-Conservative	1874	1st term
Charlevoix	Pierre-Alexis Tremblay	Liberal	1867	3rd term
Charlevoix	Hector-Louis Langevin (from January 22, 1876)	Conservative	1867, (Note: Dorchester) 1876	3rd term*
Châteauguay	Luther Hamilton Holton	Liberal	1867	3rd term
Chicoutimi—Saguenay	Ernest Cimon	Conservative	1874	1st term
Compton	John Henry Pope	Liberal-Conservative	1867	3rd term
Dorchester	François Fortunat Rouleau	Conservative	1874	1st term
Drummond—Arthabaska	**Wilfrid Laurier**	Liberal	1874	1st term
Drummond—Arthabaska	Désiré Olivier Bourbeau (from October 27, 1877)	Conservative	1877	1st term
Gaspé	Louis George Harper	Conservative	1874	1st term
Gaspé	John Short (from July 10, 1875)	Conservative	1875	1st term
Hochelaga	Alphonse Desjardins	Conservative	1874	1st term
Huntingdon	Julius Scriver	Liberal	1869	3rd term
Iberville	François Béchard	Liberal	1867	3rd term
Jacques Cartier	**Rodolphe Laflamme**	Liberal	1872	2nd term
Joliette	Louis François Georges Baby	Conservative	1872	2nd term
Kamouraska	**Charles Pelletier**	Liberal	1869	3rd term
Kamouraska	Charles-François Roy (from February 19, 1877)	Conservative	1877	1st term
Laprairie	Alfred Pinsonneault	Conservative	1867	3rd term
L'Assomption	Hilaire Hurteau	Liberal-Conservative	1874	1st term
Laval	Joseph-Aldric Ouimet	Liberal-Conservative	1873	2nd term
Lévis	Louis-Honoré Fréchette	Liberal	1874	1st term
L'Islet	Philippe Baby Casgrain	Liberal	1872	2nd term
Lotbinière	Henri Bernier	Liberal	1874	1st term
Maskinongé	Louis-Alphonse Boyer	Liberal	1872	2nd term
Mégantic	Édouard-Émery Richard	Liberal	1872	2nd term
Missisquoi	William Donahue	Liberal	1874	1st term
Montcalm	Firmin Dugas	Conservative	1871	3rd term
Montmagny	Henri-Thomas Taschereau	Liberal	1872	2nd term
Montmorency	Jean Langlois	Conservative	1867	3rd term
Montreal Centre	Michael Patrick Ryan	Liberal-Conservative	1872	2nd term
Montreal Centre	Bernard Devlin (from November 26, 1875)	Liberal	1875	1st term
Montreal East	Louis-Amable Jetté	Liberal	1872	2nd term
Montreal West	Frederick Mackenzie	Liberal	1874	1st term
Montreal West	Thomas Workman (from October 30, 1875)	Liberal	1875	1st term
Napierville	**Antoine-Aimé Dorion**	Liberal	1872	2nd term
Napierville	Sixte Coupal dit la Reine (from August 4, 1874)	Liberal	1874	1st term
Nicolet	Joseph Gaudet	Conservative	1867	3rd term
Nicolet	François-Xavier-Ovide Méthot (from December 18, 1877)	Independent Conservative	1877	1st term
Ottawa (County of)	Alonzo Wright	Liberal-Conservative	1867	3rd term
Pontiac	William McKay Wright	Liberal-Conservative	1872	2nd term
Portneuf	Esdras Alfred de St-Georges	Liberal	1872	2nd term
Quebec-Centre	**Joseph-Édouard Cauchon**	Conservative	1872	2nd term
Quebec-Centre	Jacques Malouin (from November 3, 1877)	Independent	1877	1st term
Quebec County	Joseph-Philippe-René-Adolphe Caron	Conservative	1873	2nd term
Quebec East	Isidore Thibaudeau	Liberal	1874	1st term
Quebec East	**Wilfrid Laurier** (from November 28, 1877)	Liberal	1874	1st term
Quebec West	Thomas McGreevy	Liberal-Conservative	1867	3rd term
Richelieu	Georges Isidore Barthe	Independent Conservative	1870, 1874	2nd term*
Richmond—Wolfe	Henry Aylmer	Liberal	1874	1st term
Rimouski	Jean-Baptiste Romuald Fiset	Liberal	1872	2nd term
Rouville	Guillaume Cheval dit St-Jacques	Liberal	1867, 1874	2nd term*
Saint Maurice	Charles Gérin-Lajoie	Liberal	1874	1st term
Shefford	**Lucius Huntington**	Liberal	1867	3rd term
Town of Sherbrooke	Edward Towle Brooks	Conservative	1872	2nd term
Soulanges	Jacques-Philippe Lanthier	Conservative	1872	2nd term
St. Hyacinthe	Louis Delorme	Liberal	1870	3rd term
St. John's	François Bourassa	Liberal	1867	3rd term
Stanstead	Charles Carroll Colby	Liberal-Conservative	1867	3rd term
Témiscouata	Jean-Baptiste Pouliot	Liberal	1874	1st term
Terrebonne	Louis Masson	Conservative	1867	3rd term
Three Rivers	William McDougall	Conservative	1868	3rd term
Two Mountains	Wilfrid Prévost	Liberal	1872	2nd term
Two Mountains	Charles Auguste Maximilien Globensky (from February 26, 1875)	Independent	1875	1st term
Two Mountains	Jean-Baptiste Daoust (from March 11, 1876)	Conservative	1876	1st term
Vaudreuil	Robert Harwood	Liberal-Conservative	1872	2nd term
Verchères	**Félix Geoffrion**	Liberal	1867	3rd term
Yamaska	Charles Gill	Conservative	1874	1st term

Twelve MPs recontested their seats in byelections, and were reelected:

- **Félix Geoffrion** was reelected in Verchères on July 25, 1874, after being named Minister of Inland Revenue.
- **Henry Aylmer** was reelected in Richmond—Wolfe on December 4, 1874, after being named Receiver-General.
- **Louis François George Baby** was reelected in Joliette on December 10, 1874.
- **Frederick Mackenzie** was reelected in Montreal West on December 10, 1874.
- **Amable Jodoin** was reelected in Chambly on December 30, 1874.
- **Hilaire Hurteau** was reelected in L'Assomption on January 16, 1875.
- **Sixte Coupal dit la Reine** was reelected in Napierville on June 19, 1875.
- **Bernard Devlin** was reelected in Montreal Centre on November 26, 1875.
- **François Fortunat Rouleau** was reelected in Dorchester on December 14, 1875.
- **Joseph-Édouard Cauchon** was reelected in Quebec Centre on December 27, 1875, after being named President of the Privy Council.
- **Rodolphe Laflamme** was reelected in Jacques Cartier on December 28, 1876, after being named Minister of Inland Revenue.
- **Hector-Louis Langevin** was reelected in Charlevoix on March 23, 1877.

== By-elections ==
By-election	Date	Incumbent	Party	Winner	Party	Cause	Retained
New Westminster	March 25, 1878	James Cunningham	Liberal	Thomas Robert McInnes	Independent	Resignation	No
Northumberland	February 5, 1878	Peter Mitchell	Independent	Peter Mitchell	Independent	Resignation to re-contest after being accused of violating the Independence of Parliament Act by leasing a building to the government while he was a senator.	Yes
Halifax	January 29, 1878	Alfred Gilpin Jones	Independent	Alfred Gilpin Jones	Independent	Resignation to re-contest because of an alleged breach of the Independence of Parliament Act.	Yes
Digby	January 19, 1878	William Berrian Vail	Liberal	John Chipman Wade	Conservative	Resignation to re-contest due to conflict of interest allegations.	No
Restigouche	January 12, 1878	George Moffat Sr.	Conservative	George Haddow	Independent	Resignation	No
Nicolet	December 18, 1877	Joseph Gaudet	Conservative	François-Xavier-Ovide Méthot	Independent Conservative	Appointed to the Legislative Council of Quebec	No
Quebec East	November 28, 1877	Isidore Thibaudeau	Liberal	Wilfrid Laurier	Liberal	Resignation to provide a seat for Laurier.	Yes
Quebec-Centre	November 3, 1877	Joseph-Édouard Cauchon	Conservative	Jacques Malouin	Independent	Appointed Lieutenant-Governor of Manitoba.	No
Drummond—Arthabaska	October 27, 1877	Wilfrid Laurier	Liberal	Désiré Olivier Bourbeau	Conservative	Recontested upon appointment as Minister of Inland Revenue.	No
Gloucester	July 2, 1877	Timothy Anglin	Liberal	Timothy Anglin	Liberal	Resignation to re-contest after being found in violation of the Independence of Parliament Act for accepting government printing contracts, and being censured by the House of Commons Committee on Privilege.	Yes
Ottawa (City of)	May 9, 1877	Joseph Merrill Currier	Liberal-Conservative	Joseph Merrill Currier	Liberal-Conservative	Resignation to re-contest for having infringed the Independence of Parliament Act by conducting business dealings with the government while still a member.	Yes
Lincoln	May 9, 1877	James Norris	Liberal	James Norris	Liberal	Resigns in order to re-contest after acquiring a government contract.	Yes
Charlevoix	March 23, 1877	Hector-Louis Langevin	Conservative	Hector-Louis Langevin	Conservative	Election declared void.	Yes
Kamouraska	February 19, 1877	Charles Alphonse Pantaléon Pelletier	Liberal	Charles-François Roy	Conservative	Called to the Senate.	No
Jacques Cartier	December 28, 1876	Rodolphe Laflamme	Liberal	Rodolphe Laflamme	Liberal	Recontested upon appointment as Minister of Inland Revenue.	Yes
Cardwell	December 14, 1876	John Hillyard Cameron	Conservative	Dalton McCarthy	Conservative	Death	Yes
Queen's County	November 22, 1876	David Laird	Liberal	James Colledge Pope	Conservative	Appointed Lieutenant-Governor of the North West Territories.	No
Bothwell	November 15, 1876	David Mills	Liberal	David Mills	Liberal	Recontested upon appointment as Minister of the Interior and Superintendent General of Indian Affairs.	Yes
Beauce	October 18, 1876	Christian Henry Pozer	Liberal	Joseph Bolduc	Conservative	Called to the Senate.	No
Victoria	September 21, 1876	Barclay Edmund Tremaine	Liberal	Charles James Campbell	Conservative	Appointed a County Court judge.	No
Glengarry	July 31, 1876	Archibald McNab	Liberal	Archibald McNab	Liberal	Election declared void.	Yes
Ontario South	July 5, 1876	Malcolm Cameron	Liberal	Thomas Nicholson Gibbs	Liberal-Conservative	Death	No
Ontario North	July 5, 1876	Adam Gordon	Liberal	William Henry Gibbs	Conservative	Death	No
Wellington South	July 5, 1876	David Stirton	Liberal	Donald Guthrie	Liberal	Appointed Postmaster of Guelph.	Yes
Middlesex North	June 7, 1876	Thomas Scatcherd	Liberal	Robert Colin Scatcherd	Liberal	Death	Yes.
Two Mountains	March 11, 1876	Charles Auguste Maximilien Globensky	Independent	Jean-Baptiste Daoust	Conservative	Resignation	No
Charlevoix	January 22, 1876	Pierre-Alexis Tremblay	Liberal	Hector-Louis Langevin	Conservative	Election declared void.	No
Renfrew North	January 21, 1876	William Murray	Liberal	Peter White	Conservative	Election declared void.	No
Chambly	January 7, 1876	Amable Jodoin	Liberal	Pierre Basile Benoit	Conservative	Election declared void.	No
Argenteuil	December 31, 1875	Lemuel Cushing, Jr.	Liberal	Thomas Christie	Liberal	Election declared void.	Yes
Quebec-Centre	December 27, 1875	Joseph-Édouard Cauchon	Conservative	Joseph-Édouard Cauchon	Conservative	Recontested upon appointment as President of the Privy Council.	Yes
Dorchester	December 14, 1875	François Fortunat Rouleau	Liberal-Conservative	François Fortunat Rouleau	Liberal-Conservative	Election declared void.	Yes
Montreal Centre	November 26, 1875	Bernard Devlin	Liberal	Bernard Devlin	Liberal	Election declared void.	Yes
Bellechasse	November 23, 1875	Télesphore Fournier	Liberal	Joseph Goderic Blanchet	Conservative	Appointed to the Supreme Court of Canada.	No
West Toronto	November 6, 1875	Thomas Moss	Liberal	John Beverly Robinson	Conservative	Appointed to the Court of Appeal of Ontario	No
Montreal West	October 30, 1875	Frederick Mackenzie	Liberal	Thomas Workman	Liberal	Election declared void.	Yes
Victoria North	September 17, 1875	James Maclennan	Liberal	Hector Cameron	Conservative	Court overturns result of 1874 by-election and declared Cameron seated.	No
Gaspé	July 10, 1875	Louis George Harper	Conservative	John Short	Conservative	Election declared void.	Yes
Glengarry	July 7, 1875	Donald Alexander Macdonald	Liberal	Archibald McNab	Liberal	Appointed Lieutenant-Governor of Ontario.	Yes
Perth North	July 7, 1875	Andrew Monteith	Conservative	Andrew Monteith	Conservative	Election declared void.	Yes
York North	June 29, 1875	Alfred Hutchinson Dymond	Liberal	Alfred Hutchinson Dymond	Liberal	Election declared void.	Yes
Monck	June 22, 1875	Lachlin McCallum	Liberal-Conservative	Lachlin McCallum	Liberal-Conservative	Election declared void.	Yes
Napierville	June 19, 1875	Sixte Coupal dit la Reine	Liberal	Sixte Coupal dit la Reine	Liberal	Election declared void.	Yes
Bruce South	June 2, 1875	Edward Blake	Liberal	Edward Blake	Liberal	Recontested upon appointment as Minister of Justice.	Yes
Toronto Centre	May 21, 1875	Robert Wilkes	Liberal	John Macdonald	Liberal	Election declared void.	Yes
Hamilton	May 20, 1875	Andrew Trew Wood and Aemilius Irving	Liberal	Aemilius Irving and Andrew Trew Wood	Liberal	Double member constituency - elections declared void.	Yes
Victoria	April 28, 1875	Charles James Campbell	Conservative	Barclay Edmund Tremaine	Liberal	Campbell unseated by decision of the Supreme Court of Nova Scotia., 28 February 1875; Tremaine declared duly elected by decision of Election Court, 28 April 1875	No
Provencher	March 31, 1875	Louis Riel	Independent	Andrew Bannatyne	Liberal	Unseated from the House of Commons and declared an outlaw, 25 February 1875	No
Wellington North	March 18, 1875	Nathaniel Higinbotham	Liberal	Nathaniel Higinbotham	Liberal	Election declared void.	Yes
Berthier	February 27, 1875	Anselme-Homère Pâquet	Liberal	Edward Octavian Cuthbert	Conservative	Called to the Senate.	No
Two Mountains	February 26, 1875	Wilfrid Prévost	Liberal	Charles Auguste Maximilien Globensky	Independent	Election declared void	No
Renfrew South	February 20, 1875	John Lorn McDougall	Liberal	John Lorn McDougall	Liberal	Election declared void.	Yes
London	February 18, 1875	John Walker	Liberal	James Harshaw Fraser	Liberal-Conservative	Election declared void	No
Huron South	February 11, 1875	Malcolm Colin Cameron	Liberal	Thomas Greenway	Independent	Election declared void.	No
Middlesex East	January 28, 1875	Crowell Willson	Liberal-Conservative	Duncan Macmillan	Liberal-Conservative	Election declared void.	Yes
Halton	January 25, 1875	Daniel Black Chisholm	Liberal-Conservative	William McCraney	Liberal	Election declared void.	No
Toronto East	January 18, 1875	John O'Donohoe	Liberal-Conservative	Samuel Platt	Independent	Election declared void.	No
L'Assomption	January 16, 1875	Hilaire Hurteau	Liberal-Conservative	Hilaire Hurteau	Liberal-Conservative	Election declared void.	Yes
Montreal Centre	January 12, 1875	Michael Patrick Ryan	Liberal-Conservative	Bernard Devlin	Liberal	Election declared void.	No
Chambly	December 30, 1874	Pierre Basile Benoit	Conservative	Amable Jodoin	Liberal	Election declared void.	No
Kingston	December 29, 1874	John A. Macdonald	Liberal-Conservative	John A. Macdonald	Liberal-Conservative	Election declared void.	Yes
Simcoe North	December 26, 1874	Herman Henry Cook	Liberal	Herman Henry Cook	Liberal	Election declared void.	Yes
Victoria North	December 22, 1874	James Maclennan	Liberal	James Maclennan	Liberal	Election declared void.	Yes
Niagara	December 22, 1874	Josiah Burr Plumb	Conservative	Josiah Burr Plumb	Conservative	Election declared void.	Yes
Victoria	December 17, 1874	William Ross	Liberal	Charles James Campbell	Conservative	Appointed to Collector of Customs at Halifax.	No
Colchester	December 17, 1874	Thomas McKay	Liberal-Conservative	Thomas McKay	Liberal-Conservative	Election declared void.	Yes
Leeds North and Grenville North	December 16, 1874	Charles Frederick Ferguson	Liberal-Conservative	Charles Frederick Ferguson	Liberal-Conservative	Election declared void.	Yes
Norfolk South	December 16, 1874	John Stuart	Liberal	William Wallace	Conservative	Election declared void.	No
Wellington Centre	December 13, 1874	George Turner Orton	Liberal-Conservative	George Turner Orton	Liberal-Conservative	Election declared void.	Yes
Northumberland East	December 12, 1874	James Lyons Biggar	Independent Liberal	James Lyons Biggar	Independent Liberal	Election declared void.	Yes
Joliette	December 10, 1874	Louis François Georges Baby	Conservative	Louis François Georges Baby	Conservative	Election declared void.	Yes
Montreal West	December 10, 1874	Frederick Mackenzie	Liberal	Frederick Mackenzie	Liberal	Election declared void.	Yes
Richmond—Wolfe	December 4, 1874	Henry Aylmer	Liberal	Henry Aylmer	Liberal	Election declared void.	Yes
Northumberland West	November 17, 1874	William Kerr	Liberal	William Kerr	Liberal	Election declared void.	Yes
Lincoln	November 17, 1874	James Norris	Liberal	James Norris	Liberal	Election declared void.	Yes
Argenteuil	November 4, 1874	John Abbott	Liberal-Conservative	Lemuel Cushing, Jr.	Liberal	Election declared void.	No
Renfrew North	November 4, 1874	Peter White	Conservative	William Murray	Liberal	Election declared void.	No
Addington	October 28, 1874	Schuyler Shibley	Conservative	Schuyler Shibley	Liberal-Conservative	Election declared void.	Yes
Digby	October 26, 1874	Edwin Randolph Oakes	Liberal-Conservative	William Berrian Vail	Liberal	Appointed to the Legislative Council of Nova Scotia.	No
Renfrew South	October 24, 1874	John Lorn McDougall	Liberal	John Lorn McDougall	Liberal	Election declared void.	Yes
Essex	October 22, 1874	William McGregor	Liberal	William McGregor	Liberal	Election declared void.	Yes
Cornwall	October 20, 1874	Alexander Francis Macdonald	Liberal	Alexander Francis Macdonald	Liberal	Election declared void.	Yes
Provencher	September 3, 1874	Louis Riel	Independent	Louis Riel	Independent	Expelled from the House of Commons	Yes
Marquette	August 25, 1874	Robert Cunningham	Liberal	Joseph O'Connell Ryan	Liberal	Death, Ryan awarded seat upon re-examination of votes cast.	Yes
Elgin East	August 11, 1874	William Harvey	Liberal	Colin MacDougall	Liberal	Death	Yes
Napierville	August 4, 1874	Antoine-Aimé Dorion	Liberal	Sixte Coupal dit la Reine	Liberal	Appointed Chief Justice of Quebec.	Yes
Verchères	July 25, 1874	Félix Geoffrion	Liberal	Félix Geoffrion	Liberal	Recontested upon appointment as Minister of Inland Revenue.	Yes
Oxford South	May 23, 1874	Ebenezer Vining Bodwell	Liberal	James Atchison Skinner	Liberal	Appointed Superintendent of the Welland Canal.	Yes
Durham West	April 7, 1874	Edmund B. Wood	Liberal	Harvey William Burk	Liberal	Appointed Chief Justice of Manitoba.	Yes
