= Benjamin Gault =

Benjamin Gault may refer to:

- Benjamin Maney Gault (1886–1947), American lawman and Texas Ranger
- Benjamin True Gault (1858–1942), American ornithologist and bird conservationist
