= Sun Life Financial =

Canadian insurance company

Sun Life Financial Inc.

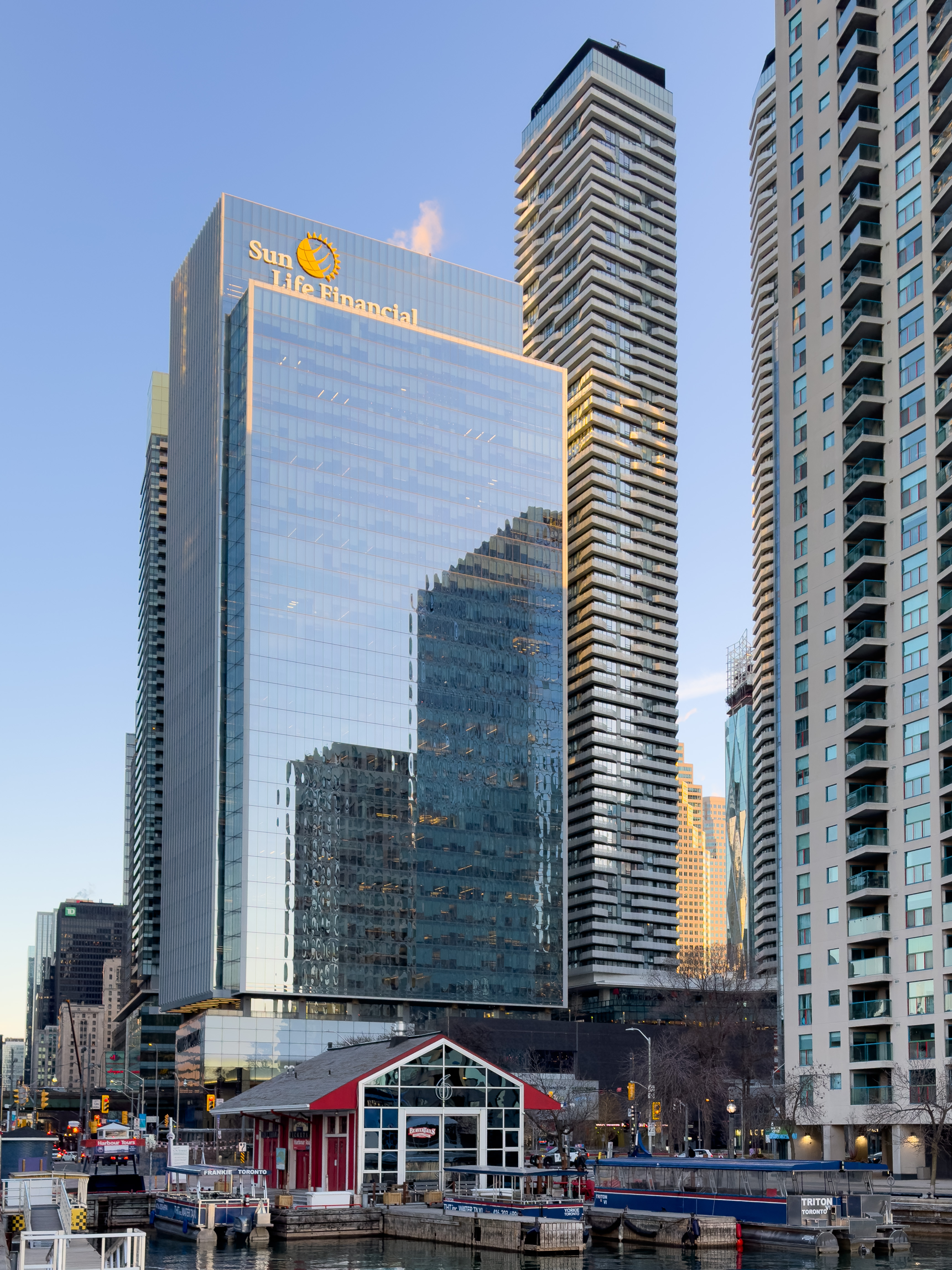
- Sun Life Global Headquarters at One York Street in Toronto, Canada
- Type: Public
- Traded as: TSX: SLF; NYSE: SLF; PSE: SLF
- Industry: Financial services
- Founded: 1865; 161 years ago Montreal, Canada
- Founder: Matthew Hamilton Gault
- Headquarters: Toronto, Canada
- Key people: Scott F. Powers (Chairman); Kevin Strain (President and CEO)
- Products: Insurance; Financial planning; Asset management; Investment management; Mutual funds; Exchange-traded funds; Index funds; Fund of funds; Retirement savings
- Revenue: ▼CA$35.7 billion (2021)
- Operating income: ▲CA$5.09 billion (2021)
- Net income: ▲CA$3.93 billion (2021)
- AUM: ▲CA$1.44 trillion (2021)
- Total assets: ▲CA$345.37 billion (2021)
- Total equity: ▲CA$28.07 billion (2021)
- Number of employees: 50,000 (2021)
- Subsidiaries: BentallGreenOak; Crescent Capital Group; MFS Investment Management
- Website: www.sunlife.com

Sun Life Financial Inc. is a financial services company headquartered in Toronto, Canada. Founded in 1865, it operates internationally in life insurance, wealth management, and asset management. As of 2024, the company manages over CAD$1.3 trillion in assets and serves clients in Canada, the United States, Asia, and other markets.

Sun Life is one of the largest life insurers in Canada and ranks among the top global insurers by market capitalization. It is publicly traded on the Toronto and New York stock exchanges.

== History ==
=== Pre-World War II ===
Founded in Montreal, Canada, as The Sun Insurance Company of Montreal in 1865 by Matthew Hamilton Gault (1822–1887), an Irish immigrant who settled in Montreal in 1842. However, operations actually began in 1871. By the end of the 19th century, it had expanded to Central and South America, the United States, the United Kingdom, West Indies, Japan, China, Philippines, India, North Africa and other international markets. During the next five decades, the company grew and prospered, surviving the difficulties of World War I and the large drain on its finances through policy claims arising from the large number of deaths caused by the Great Flu Epidemic of 1918.

The company's original Dominion Square building in Montreal was built in 1918. Capping a Montreal construction boom that began in the 1920s, the company completed construction of the expansion of its headquarters with its new 26-story headquarters north tower in 1933. Although the head office of the Royal Bank of Canada on St. James Street was taller by several floors, the Sun Life Building was at the time the largest building in terms of square footage anywhere in the British Empire.

Chartered in 1865, its traditional base business worldwide remains life insurance. However, it now also has significant asset management operations. In 1919, it was the first Canadian company to offer group life insurance. Having begun its first US operations in 1895, the company sold its first group life plan in the U.S. in 1924.

=== World War II ===
In World War II, as part of Operation Fish, securities from the United Kingdom were secretly moved to the Sun Life Building for safekeeping. A persistent, but incorrect, rumour is that the Crown Jewels of the United Kingdom had been illegally shipped out of the United Kingdom during WWII and stored there was deliberately spread in Montreal to account for increased activity at the building.

=== 1977–1980 ===
In 1977, the newly-elected sovereigntist Quebec government passed the Charter of the French Language (known as Bill 101), making the use of French language mandatory for medium- and large-scale companies when communicating with French-speaking staff. The law was received negatively by the English-speaking business community, many of whom perceived that the historical rights of the English-speaking minority should be respected. The new government also promised a referendum on Quebec sovereignty, injecting instability into the Montreal business community. On January 6, 1978, Sun Life became the first large company to leave Quebec post-election, announcing that it would move its head office to rented space in Toronto, Ontario. Officially, Sun Life said it was motivated by the political instability and economic uncertainty of Quebec's future, but skeptics said it was the company's unwillingness to comply with the requirements of Bill 101. In a reaction the next day, the province's finance minister Jacques Parizeau called Sun Life "one of the worst exporters of Quebec capital", and threatened to freeze some $400 million CAD in assets.

In 1979, the company acquired a property at University Avenue and King Street in downtown Toronto and constructed a new office complex, the Sun Life Centre, which was completed in 1984.

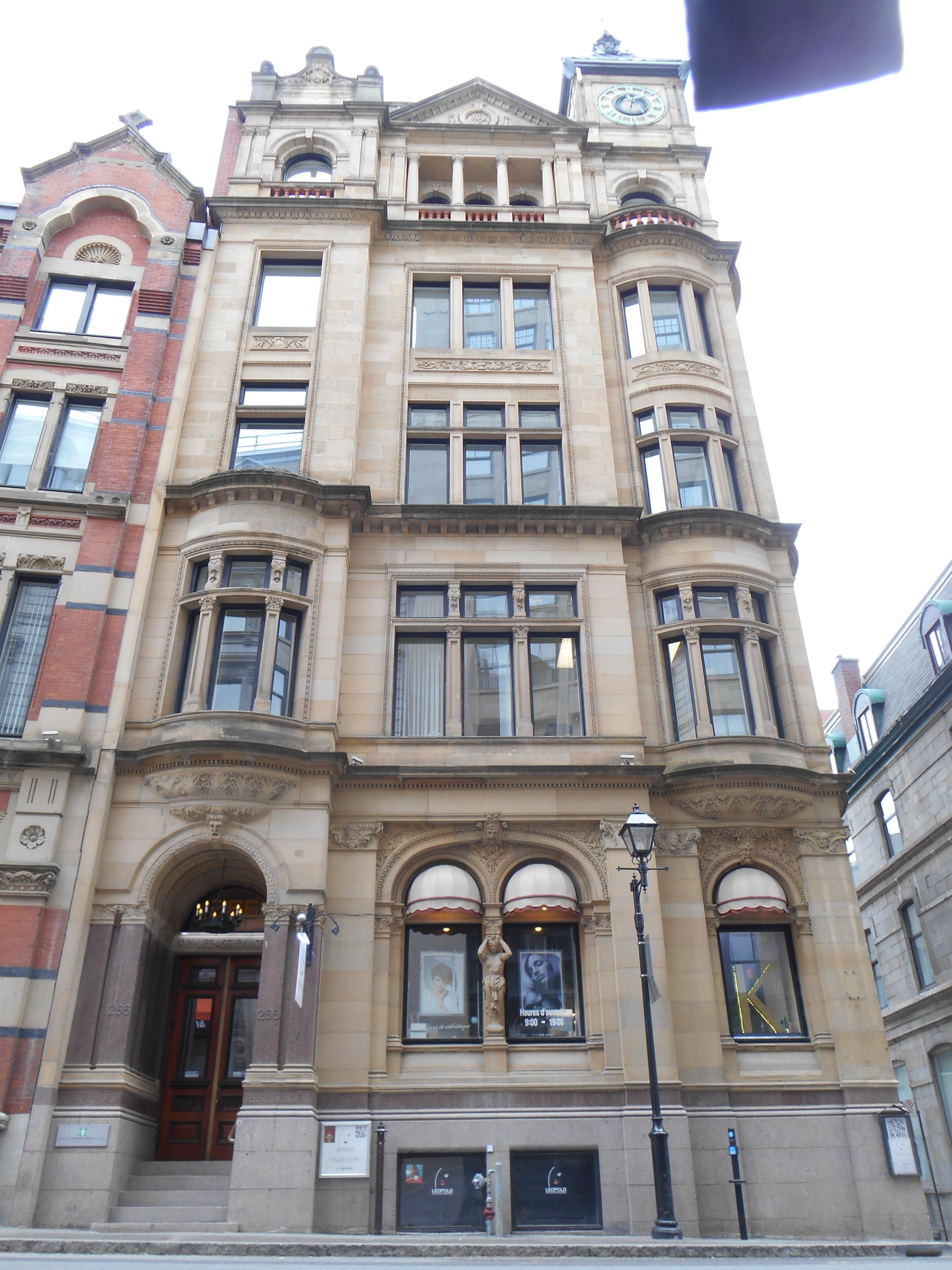
The 1889 Sun Life Building at 266 rue Notre-Dame, by Robert Findlay.

For the largest employer of English-speaking people in Montreal, this would make things very difficult. Many, if not most, of Sun Life's Head Office employees in 1979 were not fluent in French. Sun Life was quite clear that this was the reason for its move when it made the announcement. The PQ government was quick to label Sun Life "bad corporate citizens" and claimed that if "they had only warned us, we could have worked something out."

The downsizing of Sun Life's Montreal office did not take place overnight. Transfers and moves occurred on a departmental basis and did not commence until several months after the announcement. By 1980, 300 head office employees were located in Toronto.

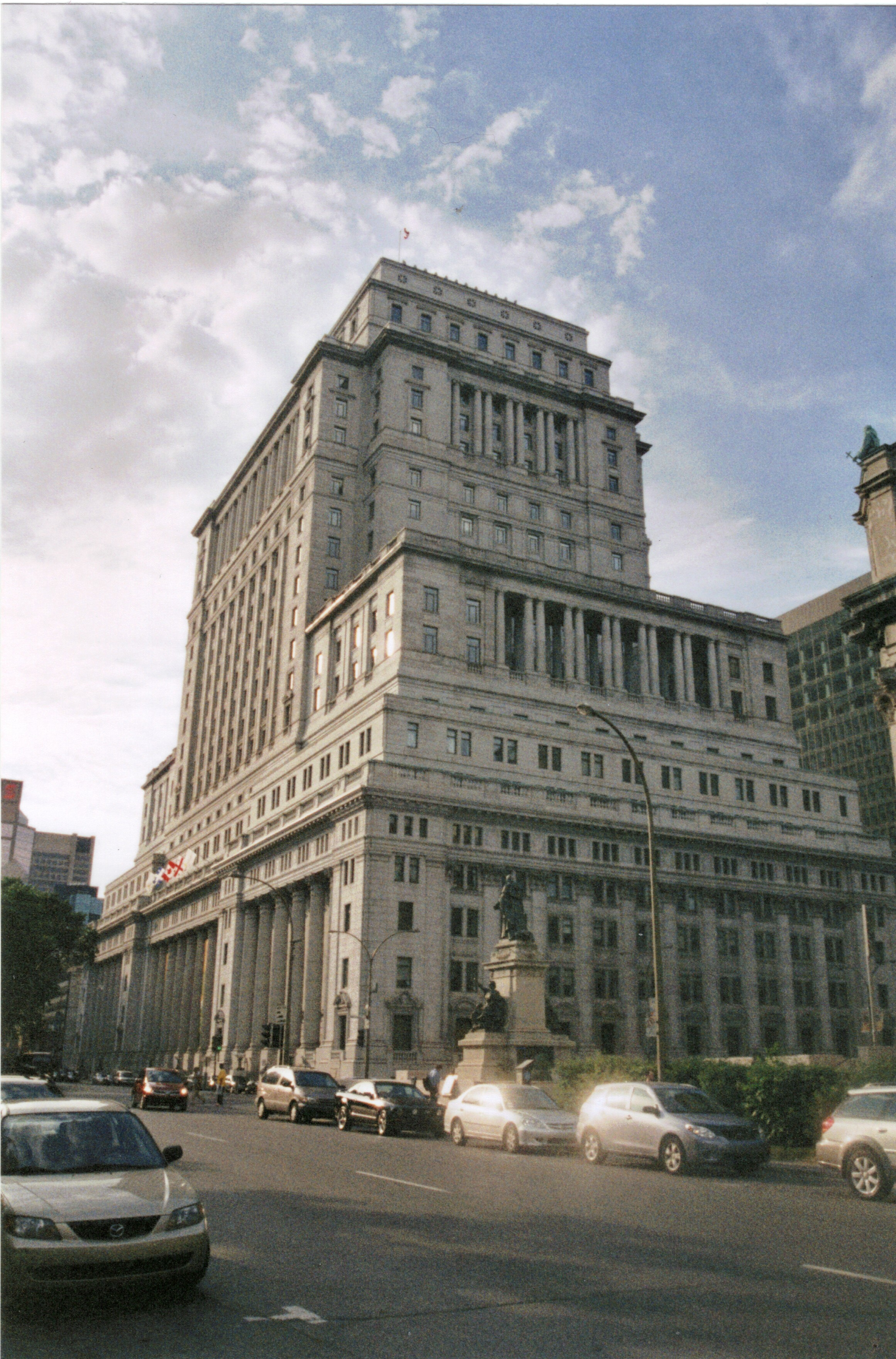
The Sun Life building in Montreal, Quebec

=== 2000s ===
In 2008, Sun Life sold its 37% interest in CI Financial Income Fund to Scotiabank. Sun Life had originally acquired a significant ownership interest in the firm by selling its Canadian mutual fund subsidiaries to CI Financial in 2002.

=== 2010s ===
In addition, in July 2019, SLC's real estate division was merged under the name BentallGreenOak Real Estate.

In December 2020, Dean Connor announced his intent to retire as President and CEO in August 2021. He was then replaced by Kevin Strain, who was the former Chief Financial Officer at Sun Life.

== Sun Life in North America ==
=== Canada ===
Sun Life contributes to the local economy as one of the top 5 major employers in the region, with approximately 3,500 employees – more than 40% of Sun Life's employee base in Canada.

In 2012, Sun Life celebrated the 100th anniversary of its Canadian head office building, located on King Street, right on the border of the Cities of Kitchener and Waterloo. The English headquarters is in Waterloo, and most of the French business is done in the main Montreal office. There are also offices in Toronto, Vancouver, Halifax and Ottawa.

In early 2023, Sun Life's Sponsored Markets business was acquired by Securian Canada.

=== United States ===
Sun Life U.S. has the sixth-largest group benefits business in the United States and serves more than 60,000 employers in small, medium and large workplaces.

In 2018, Sun Life U.S. was named one of the Top Places to Work in Massachusetts for 2018 by The Boston Globe.

== Sun Life Asset Management ==
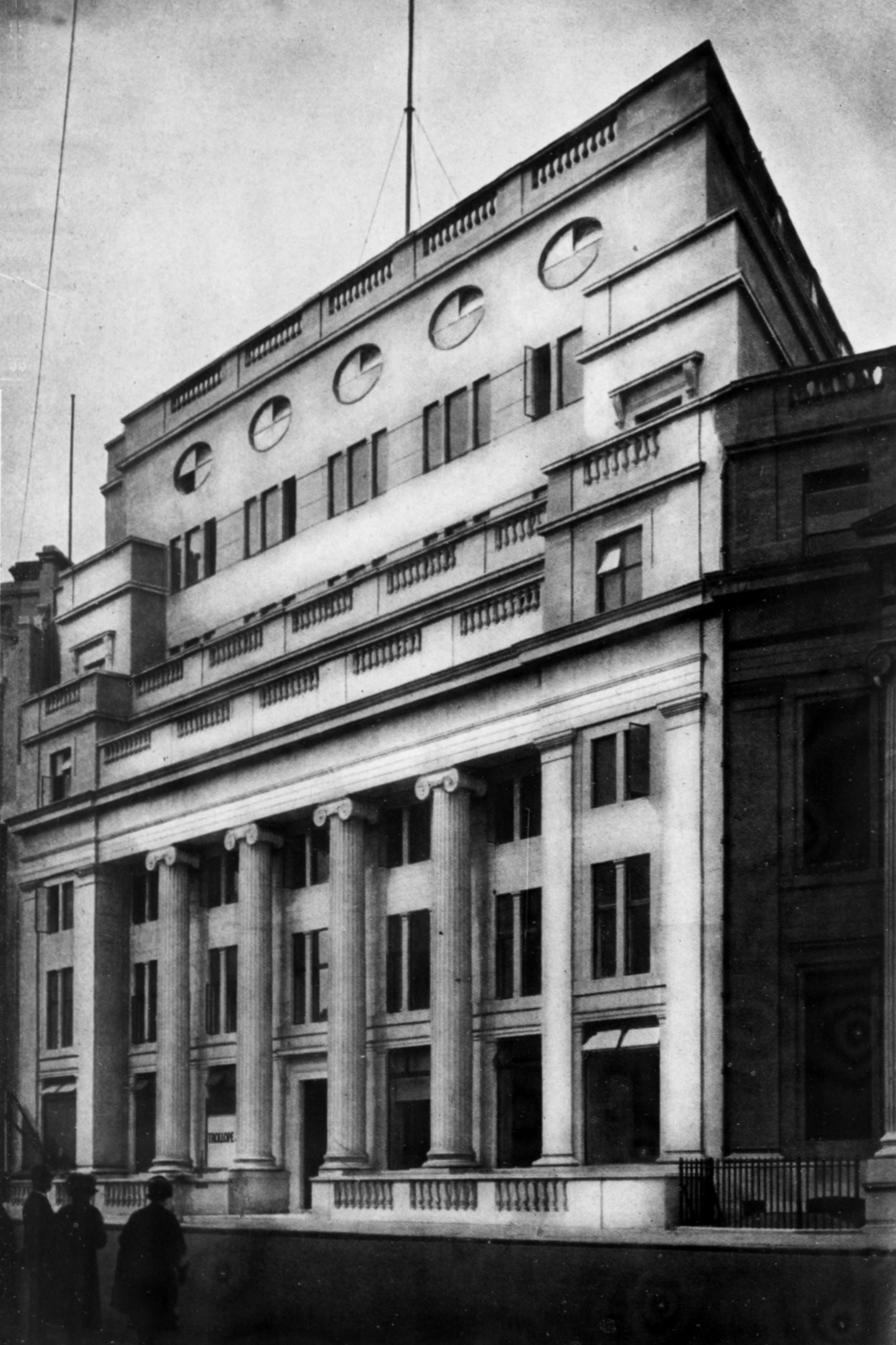
The London office, designed by Septimus Warwick in 1928. It is now part of Canada House.

Sun Life's asset management operation includes subsidiaries:

- MFS Investment Management, which serves individual and institutional investors around the world;
- SLC Management, which provides investment options for defined benefit pension plans, insurance companies and other institutional investors globally. SLC Management has two distinct units: a fixed-income pillar operating under the SLC Management banner (including Sun Life affiliates Prime Advisors, Ryan Labs Asset Management and Sun Life Institutional Investments); and a real estate division named BentallGreenOak.
- In December 2019, Sun Life announced an intention to acquire a majority stake in InfraRed Capital Partners, which will see InfraRed form part of SLC Management
- In October 2020, Sun Life announced an intent to acquire a 51% stake in alternative credit investment manager Crescent Capital LP. Crescent will be part of SLC Management.

As of March 31, 2019, SLC Management's collective operations have assets under management of C$212 billion (US$159 billion).

=== SLC Management ===
SLC Management, formerly Sun Life Investment Management (SLIM), began in 2013 when Sun Life created Sun Life Institutional Investments (Canada) Inc., to offer a range of institutional alternative asset class funds to investors in Canada.

In June 2019, Sun Life re-branded SLIM to SLC Management and fully merged its fixed income businesses, Ryan Labs Asset Management Inc. and Prime Advisors, Inc. with Sun Life Capital Management (U.S.) In addition, in July 2019, SLC's real estate division was merged under the name BentallGreenOak Real Estate.

== Sun Life in Asia ==
Sun Life operates in eight Asian markets - China, Hong Kong, Malaysia, Singapore, Indonesia, Vietnam, India, and Philippines.

In 1891, the company persuaded businessman Ira Thayer to go to Asia to start an insurance business. Thayer set up a business in China in 1892 that went on to prosper for the next 54 years.

Sun Life grew to become the biggest foreign insurer in China until the Second World War when it shut down operations. The company returned to China in 1995 via a joint venture.

=== China ===
In 1995, Sun Life joined with the China Everbright Group to form Sun Life Everbright.

In 2002, Sun Life Everbright was granted approval to sell life insurance in Tianjin, China, becoming the first foreign life insurance joint venture to operate in that city and its neighbouring counties.

In 2011, Sun Life Everbright received regulatory approval in China to establish Sun Life Everbright Insurance Asset Management Company, only the 12th such license issued in China.

=== Hong Kong ===
Sun Life started operating in Hong Kong since February 22, 1892.

There was a name change from SunLife Financial (HK) Ltd to Sun Life Hong Kong Ltd.

Sun Life acquired CMG Asia ComServe Financial from Commonwealth Bank of Australia in 2005.

For some years, it had taken over the MPF schemes from a number of other competitors in 2010s due to its strong performance of the Hong Kong equity fund. For example, in 2016, Schroder Investment Management (Hong Kong) Limited transferred its MPF scheme to Sun Life Hong Kong.

=== India ===
Birla Sun Life Asset Management, now known as the Aditya Birla Sun Life Mutual Fund (ABSLAMC), is an investment managing company registered under the Securities and Exchange Board of India. It is a joint venture between Sun Life and the Aditya Birla Group of India.

Established in 1994, BSLAMC has been a joint venture between the Aditya Birla Group and Sun Life since 1999.

With more than $34 billion U.S. in assets under management as of 2017, Aditya Birla Sun Life Asset Management Company is one of the largest asset managers in India.

Aditya Birla Sun Life Insurance was established on August 4, 2000, and began operations in 2001 with three insurance plans. The Insurance Regulatory and Development Authority (IRDA) granted registration in principle to Birla Sun Life. Initially, Sun Life Financial held a 26% stake in this joint venture, and later increased its stake to 49%.

The company received awards such as the Bhartiya Shiromani Puraskar in 2006 and the Silver award in the Insurance category at the ICAI Awards for Excellence in Financial Reporting in 2009. In 2011, ABSLI introduced the BSLI Foresight Plan, followed by the BSLI Wealth Secure Life Plan in 2012. In June 2023, ABSLI launched the Nishchit Pension Plan, aimed at assisting individuals in retirement planning. In August 2023, ABSLI announced the ABSLI Nishchit Laabh Plan, a non-linked, non-participating individual life insurance savings plan.

=== Philippines ===
Sun Life entered the Philippines in 1895, and established its Cebu operations in the 1960s. As of 2019, Sun Life is the number one provider of insurance products to Filipinos. Sun Life has been in Asia since the early 1890s.

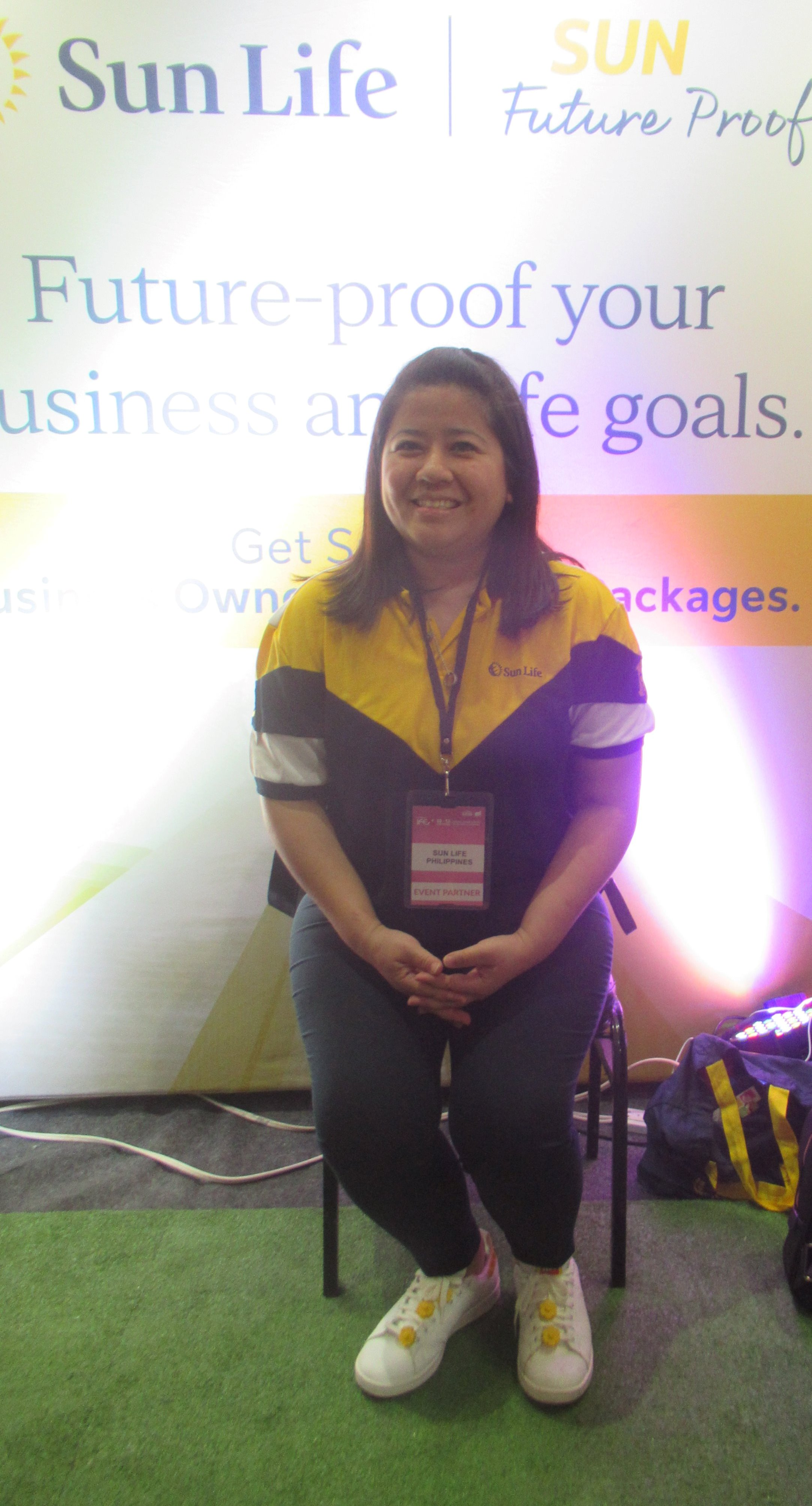
Sun Life of Canada Philippines

In 1895, Sun Life began its operations in the Philippines through the representation of the H.J. Andrews and Co., a British trading firm. Throughout the Philippine Revolution, Sun Life Philippines experienced continuous growth.

Sun Life had underground operations during the Japanese Occupation which occurred between 1942 and 1945. Sun Life was the only life insurance company who paid post-war death claims amounting to USD 1.3 million even without documents attesting to the validity of the claims. In the end, all claims were found to be legitimate.

In 2011, Sun Life signed a joint venture agreement with the Yuchengco Group of companies for the creation of Sun Life Grepa Financial Inc., marking Sun Life's entry into the bancassurance business.

In 2023, the Insurance Commission's 2023 report ranked Sun Life of Canada (Philippines), Inc. number 1 with P306.33 billion total assets and P8.79 billion net income. Hence, on its 129th anniversary, headed by CEO and Benedict Sison, it remained the top life insurance company for 13 consecutive years with P55.79 billion in Total Premium Income.

=== Singapore ===
On 12 March 2026, Sunlife and Allianz began considering bids for HSBC Holdings' insurance unit, HSBC Life. A sale process was initiated in March, with non-binding bids materialising soon.

== Corporate Initiatives ==
=== Sustainability ===
In March 2021, Sun Life announced new sustainable investing commitments, including an additional C$20 billion in sustainable investments over the next five years across its General Account and third party investments. The company is also pushing to scale back its GHG emissions intensity by 30% by 2030.

=== DEI efforts ===
Sun Life committed to having 25% of under-represented minorities and gender parity at senior leader level by 2025.

=== Sports Marketing ===
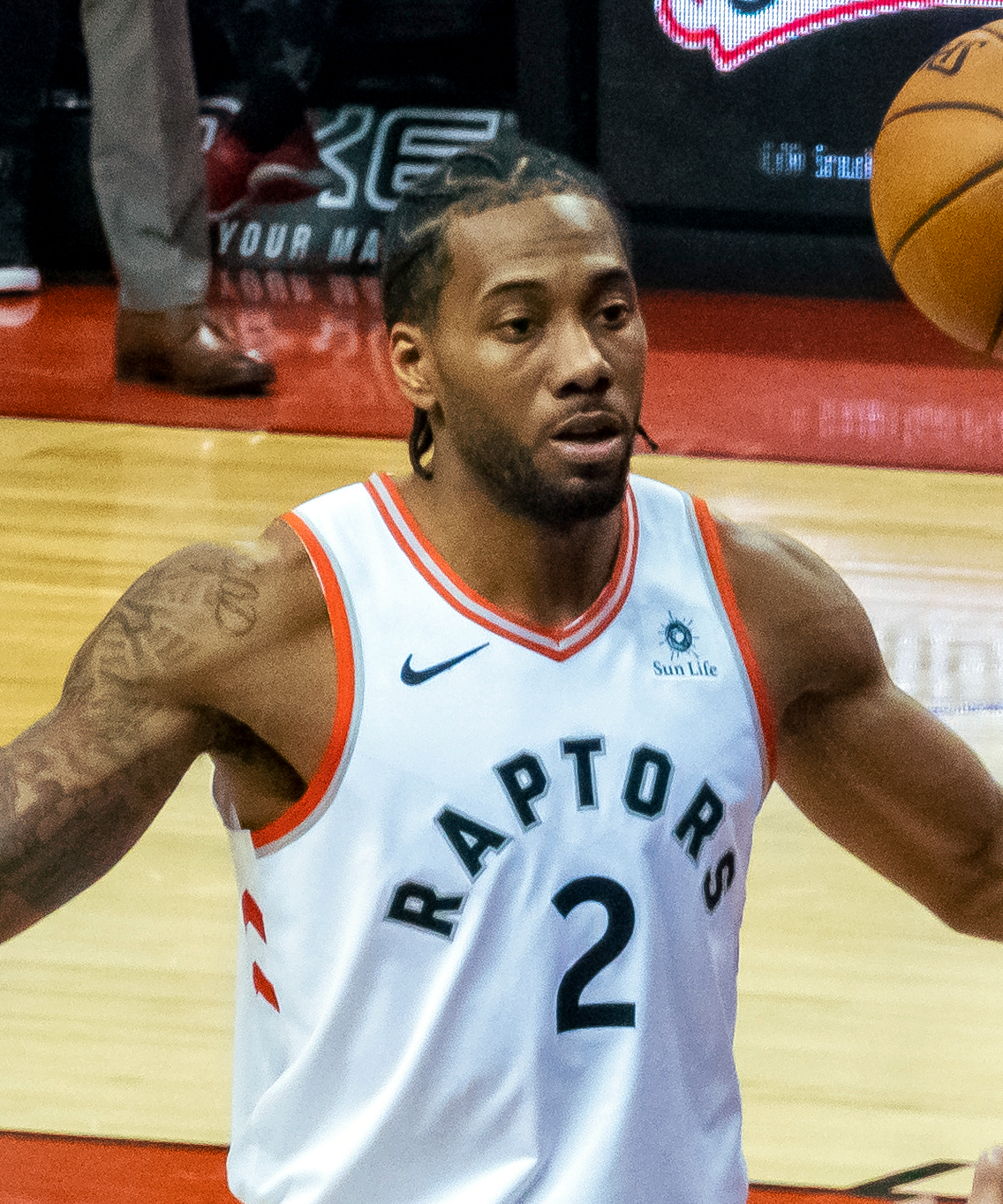
Former Raptors superstar Kawhi Leonard wearing the Sun Life patch on his jersey

==== Miami Dolphins NFL Stadium Sponsorship (2010–2016) ====
In 2010, Sun Life purchased the naming rights for the home field of the Miami Dolphins in Miami Gardens, Florida, for a reported US$7.5 million per year.

== Global Headquarters - One York ==
Sun Life Global Headquarters in Toronto, Ontario, is located at One York Street in Toronto's South Core. The 800,000-square-foot location is along the Gardiner Expressway and holds a prominent position on the Toronto skyline.

Before the Corporate Office moved to its new Global HQ at One York Street, the Sun Life Centre on King Street served as its headquarters. Previously, Sun Life Building in Montreal was the head office. The Sun Life Building in Montreal is a historic 122 m (400 ft), 24-story office building at 1155 Metcalfe Street on Dorchester Square in downtown Montreal.

== Corporate governance ==
Presidents of the company have been:

- Thomas Workman, 1871–1889
- Robertson Macaulay, 1889–1915
- Thomas Bassett Macaulay, 1915–1934
- Arthur Barton Wood, 1934–1950
- George Wesley Bourke, 1950–1962
- Alistair Matheson Campbell, 1962–1970
- Anthony Rivers Hicks, 1970–1971
- Thomas Maunsell Galt, 1972–1978
- George F. S. Clarke, 1978–1983
- John A. Brindle, 1984–1986
- John R. Gardner, 1987–1996
- Donald A. Stewart, 1996–1999
- C. James Prieur, 1999–2006
- Jon A. Boscia, 2008–2011
- Dean A. Connor, 2011–2021
- Kevin D. Strain, 2021–
