= Securian Canada =

Canadian insurance and financial services company

- Type: Private
- Industry: Insurance
- Founded: 1955
- Headquarters: Toronto, Ontario, Canada
- Key people: Nigel Branker, CEO
- Products: Life, Accident, Creditor, Critical illness, Association & Affinity, Business insurance
- Number of employees: 300+
- Parent: Securian Financial Group
- Website: https://www.securiancanada.ca/

Securian Canada is the brand name under which Canadian Premier Life Insurance Company and Canadian Premier General Insurance Company operate. These two Canadian insurance companies are headquartered in Toronto, Ontario. They provide a range of insurance products and services within the creditor market, consisting of banks and credit unions, the association and affinity market, composed of member and student association groups, and retailers, and the specialty market, composed of finance companies and other lenders. Products for various markets include creditor mortgage, loan and line of credit, credit card balance protection, group life, disability and critical illness insurance.

Securian Canada's roots go back to 1955, when the Canadian Premier Life Insurance Company was incorporated. In 2017, the business and its affiliates were purchased and brought under the Securian Financial Group's entry into the Canadian market.Securian Canada operates as an independent subsidiary of Securian Financial Group.

Following the reintegration of Valeyo Inc. and the acquisition of Sun Life Assurance Company of Canada's Sponsored Markets business in early 2023, Canadian Premier Life Insurance Company, Canadian Premier General Insurance Company and Valeyo all rebranded to Securian Canada. Since 2023, Securian Canada has served as the official life insurance partner of the Canadian Football League (CFL).and since 2024, as the official life insurance partner of the Toronto Maple Leafs.

== Leadership structure ==
The following members compose the company's executive leadership team:

- Nigel Branker - Chief Executive Officer
- Sara Mazhar - Chief Technology Officer & Chief Information Security Officer
- Sofia Theodorou - Chief Human Experience Officer
- Marc Peliel - Chief Financial Officer
- Mark Geldernick - Chief Legal Officer

== Certifications and accolades ==
- Securian Canada is a Great Place to Work certified company, based on the results of data from surveys administered to its employees.
- Gold certification for Gender Parity provided by La Gouvernance au Féminin - Women in Governance.
  - This certification recognizes Securian Canada’s efforts to support women in career advancement and leadership development, and to work toward achieving equity, diversity, and inclusion in the workplace.
- Named one of Canada's Top Insurance Employers in 2025 by Insurance Business Canada.

== Partnerships and sponsorships ==
Securian Canada serves as the official life insurance partner of the Canadian Football League (CFL) since 2023, and is the presenting sponsor of the CFL’s Diversity in Football program.

In 2023, Securian Canada announced their official sponsorship of the Canadian Association of Black Insurance Professionals (CABIP), underlining their commitment to promoting diversity within the insurance industry and supporting Black insurance professionals in their careers.

In 2024, Securian Canada announced its partnership with the Toronto Maple Leafs as its official life insurance partner, and is the presenting sponsor of Home Ice Hockey, an MLSE Foundation program that provides youth in underserved communities in the Greater Toronto Area (GTA) with access to free equipment, coaching and ice time.

It has also supported the following organizations through sponsorships, donations, and ongoing partnership:

- Indspire, investing in the education of Indigenous peoples.
- Global T20 Canada Cricket Tournament in 2023
- The Princess Margaret Cancer Foundation (PMCF) in 2025 and 2026, sponsoring to support cancer research.
- Women in Insurance Summit in 2025 and 2026, empowering women and allies in insurance.
- ParaSport Ontario's Annual Awards Brunch and Para Pro-Am Golf Tournament in 2025 and 2026, sponsorship and donation to support inclusive sports.
- Youth Baseball Indoor Camp in 2025, sponsoring to help make basketball more inclusive for youth living with disabilities.
- Douglas Foundation's Builders of Hope in 2025, donation to advance women's mental health research.

== Inclusion strategy ==
Securian Canada published its inaugural Beyond Business Report: Securian Canada's Inclusion in Action in 2025, and its second edition Beyond Business Report: Purpose in Practice in 2026 as summaries of the initiatives that had a positive impact on the lives of employees, clients, partners and local communities.

== Research ==
Securian Canada has released two research reports looking into the financial needs of populations that have been traditionally underserved in Canada:

- In 2024, Behind the Gig: Securian Canada Insights, revealed that more than half of gig workers rely on supplementary income, with rising costs driving many to seek additional employment.
- In 2025, Newcomers' Realities: Securian Canada Insights, revealed that more than half of newcomers to Canada cite financial stress as their primary well-being challenge.
- In 2026, Today's Graduates: Securian Canada Insights, explores how recent graduates are navigating career-building, financial pressures and ever-changing realities.
