= John Joseph Curran =

Canadian politician and lawyer

The Honourable John Joseph Curran PC KC

Member of Parliament for Montreal Centre
- In office 1882–1896
- Preceded by: Michael Patrick Ryan
- Succeeded by: James McShane

Personal details
- Born: February 22, 1842 Montreal, Canada East
- Died: October 1, 1909 (aged 67)
- Party: Conservative
- Profession: Lawyer
- Cabinet: Solicitor General of Canada

John Joseph Curran, PC, KC (February 22, 1842 – October 1, 1909) was a Canadian politician and lawyer. He was the country's first Solicitor General between December 5, 1892, and October 17, 1895, and a member of the Conservative Party between February 8, 1883, and October 17, 1895.

== Life ==
Born in Montreal, Canada East, Curran was one of eleven children born to Charles C. and Sarah Kennedy Curran. Charles was from County Down, Ireland, and Sarah from County Wexford. John attended Collège Ste-Marie and the University of Ottawa. He graduated from McGill Law School in 1862 and was appointed to the Bar of Quebec in 1863. In 1865 he married Mary Elizabeth Brennan, with whom he had seven children. Curran was named a Queen's Counsel in 1882 and became a judge for the Superior Court of Quebec in 1885.

Curran served three terms in the Canadian House of Commons as a member for Montreal Centre. He was a professor of the law faculty and vice-dean at Ottawa University. He was Solicitor-General in 1892 to 1895, and a contributor to various periodicals, and the Catholic Encyclopedia.

1878 Canadian federal election: Montreal Centre
Party	Candidate	Votes
Liberal–Conservative	Michael Patrick Ryan	2,624
Liberal	Bernard Devlin	1,845

1882 Canadian federal election: Montreal Centre
Party	Candidate	Votes
Conservative	John Joseph Curran	2,654
Unknown	W. Farrell	1,367

1887 Canadian federal election: Montreal Centre
Party	Candidate	Votes
Conservative	John Joseph Curran	3,116
Liberal	Henry Joseph Cloran	2,185

1891 Canadian federal election: Montreal Centre
Party	Candidate	Votes
Conservative	John Joseph Curran	3,450
Unknown	E. W. P. Guérin	2,236
