= John Young (Canadian politician) =

Canadian politician (1811-1878)

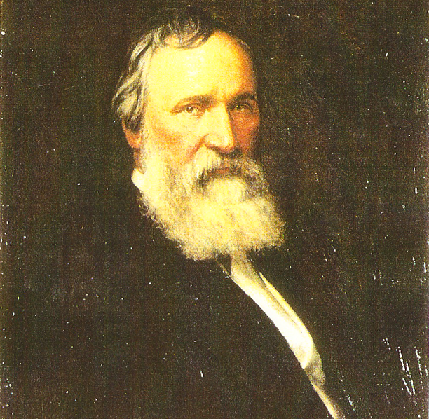
John Young

John Young (March 11, 1811 – April 12, 1878) was a Scottish-born Canadian businessman, public official, and politician. He served in the Legislative Assembly of the Province of Canada and was later elected to the House of Commons of Canada representing Montreal West. He is best remembered for his role in developing the Port of Montreal and his advocacy for free trade.

== Early life ==
Young was born in Ayr, Scotland, to William Young, a cooper. He attended Ayr Academy until the age of 14, after which he taught briefly in Coylton before immigrating to Lower Canada in 1826.

He began his business career in Kingston, Ontario, working for an import-export firm. In 1830, he moved to Montreal to work for the Torrance family firm, eventually becoming a partner with David Torrance. The firm's interests in St. Lawrence River shipping influenced Young's lifelong advocacy for improved transportation infrastructure. By 1850, he had achieved significant commercial success and constructed "Rosemount," a large estate on the southern slope of Westmount Mountain.

== Beliefs ==
Young was a prominent advocate for the commercial development of Montreal. He argued that the city's economic future depended on improved rail and water access to the interior of North America. Key projects he supported included:

- The deepening of the St. Lawrence shipping channel east of Montreal.
- The construction of the Victoria Bridge.
- The expansion of the Canadian canal system.
- The development of various railway lines, including those serving the Laurentian Mountains.

Unlike many of his contemporaries in the Montreal business elite, Young was a staunch supporter of free trade with the United States. His radical views and outspoken nature often placed him at odds with the city's conservative establishment.

== Politics ==
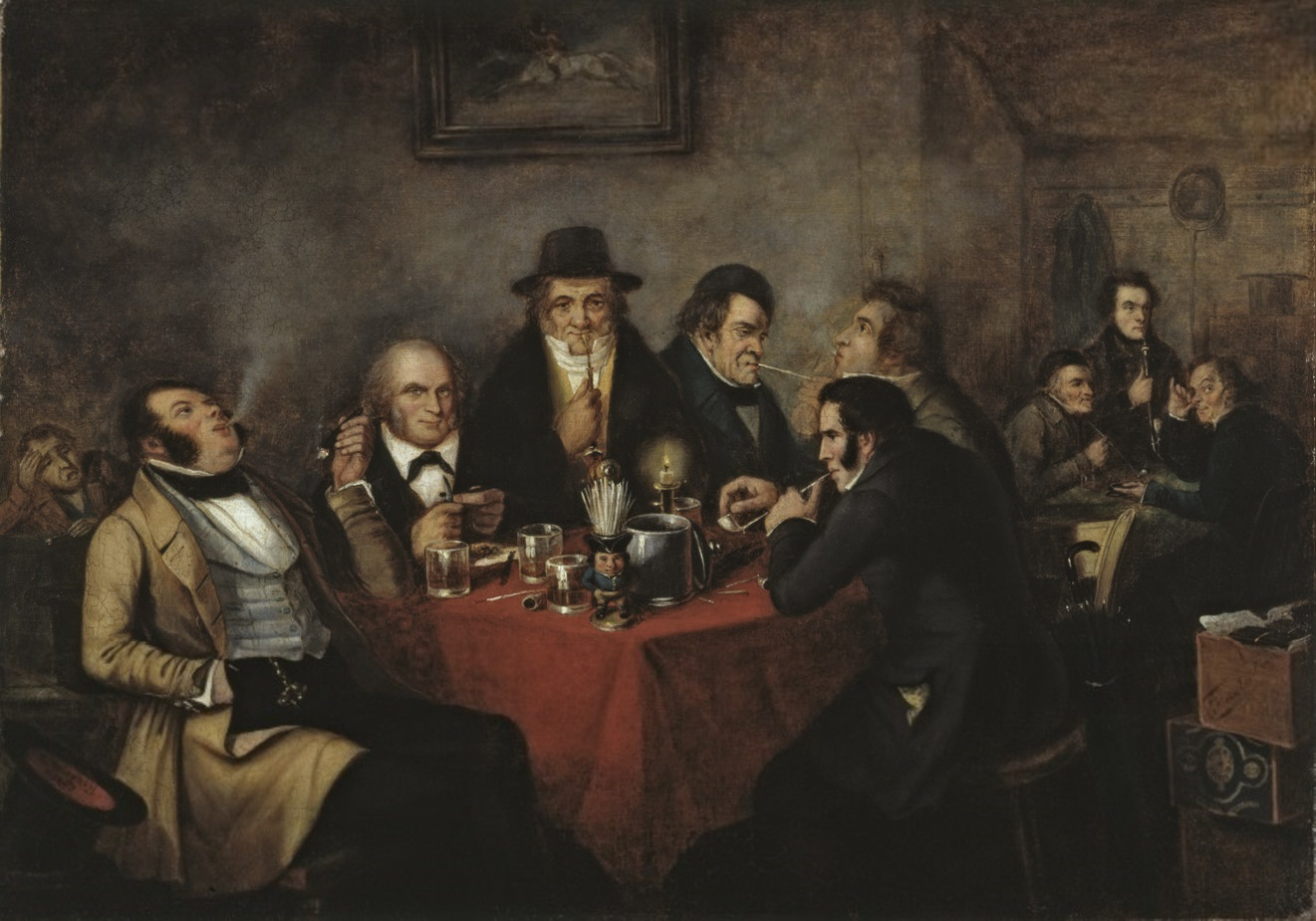
Cornelius Krieghoff painting The Shakespeare Club, Montreal, 1847; John Young is shown seated at left

Young's political alignment with the Parti rouge and his belief in free trade led to his election to the 4th and 5th Parliaments of the Province of Canada, where he served from 1851 to 1858. During this time, he served as Chief Commissioner of Public Works.

Following Canadian Confederation, Young returned to federal politics. He was elected as a Liberal Member of Parliament for Montreal West in the 1872 federal election. He did not seek re-election in 1874. Young also held significant local offices, serving as chairman of the Montreal Harbour Commission and President of the Montreal Board of Trade.

== The SS-Anglo Saxon Disaster ==
In May 1863, while returning to Canada from Scotland, Young and his family were aboard the Allan Line ship SS Anglo-Saxon when it struck an iceberg and sank off the coast of Newfoundland. Despite the loss of 238 lives, Young and his family survived. Following the disaster, Young became a vocal critic of the Allan Line's safety practices and navigation during fog.

== Later life and death ==
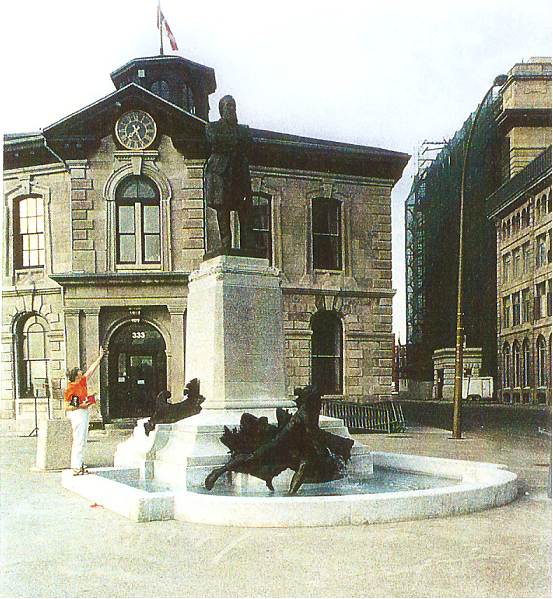
Louis-Philippe Hébert's John Young (1908) was erected at the Old Port of Montreal, Quebec.

Young's final years were marked by financial difficulties and declining health. In 1877, he represented Montreal business interests at an international trade conference in Australia. He became ill during the voyage and died shortly after his return to Montreal in 1878.

In 1908, a statue of Young by sculptor Louis-Philippe Hébert was erected at the Old Port of Montreal to honor his contributions to the city's maritime success.

== Electoral record ==
1872 Canadian federal election: Montreal West
Party	Candidate	Votes
Liberal	John Young	2,138
Unknown	George Alexander Drummond	1,322
Source: Canadian Elections Database

Parliament of Canada
Preceded by Michael Patrick Ryan	Member of Parliament for Montreal West; 1872-1874	Succeeded by Frederick Mackenzie
