= Matthew Hamilton Gault =

Canadian politician

The Honourable Matthew Hamilton Gault
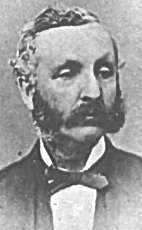

Member of the Canadian Parliament for Montreal West
- In office 1878–1887
- Preceded by: Thomas Workman
- Succeeded by: Lord Strathcona

Personal details
- Born: 18 July 1822 Strabane, County Tyrone
- Died: 1 June 1887 (aged 64) Montreal, Quebec, Canada
- Resting place: Mount Royal Cemetery
- Party: Conservative

The Hon. Matthew Hamilton Gault M.P., J.P. (18 July 1822 – 1 June 1887) was an Irish-Canadian financier and politician. In 1865, he founded Sun Life Financial in Montreal, Canada East. He was elected to the House of Commons of Canada in the 1878 election for the riding of Montreal West. A Conservative, he was re-elected in 1882 and served until his death in 1887. During the winter he lived with his family at Braehead in Montreal's Golden Square Mile. He was the brother of Andrew Frederick Gault and the uncle of Brigadier-General Andrew Hamilton Gault.

== Early years ==
Born 1822 at Strabane, County Tyrone, he was the eldest son of Leslie Gault (1787-1843) and his wife Mary Hamilton (1798-1874), daughter of Matthew Hamilton (1750-1814), of Fintra House, near Killybegs, County Donegal. Gault was privately educated by Rev. Charles Allen, considered to be one of the best classical scholars in Ireland.

At the age of fifteen, a fall from a horse severely injured his spine and gave a shock to his nervous system from which he never completely recovered. After having been confined to bed for a year, he returned to school but found himself so far behind his classmates that he became discouraged and dropped out. Until the family left for Montreal and it became clear he would have to earn his own living, he passed his time in the countryside, fishing, shooting, and hunting rabbits with his ferrets.

His popular father had been the most prosperous merchant at Strabane, controlling a large proportion of the general business of two or three Northern Irish counties. As a shipowner for many years, he sent emigrants across to New Brunswick and the United States. But, by the 1840s, Leslie Gault's finances were hit by severe losses in the grain trade and by the removal of duty on Baltic timber. On top of these difficulties, three of his ships were lost at sea while the cargoes of his five remaining ships were being thrown on a depressed market, draining him of a lifetime's savings. In 1842, his father decided to make a new start and sailed with his family to Montreal, Quebec. On arriving, his mother fell ill and was advised to return to Ireland, and only nine months later his father died of cholera.

== Business life ==
For the first few years, Gault and his younger siblings were sustained by the sale of family properties in Ireland, although further heavy losses were incurred when the savings bank where they kept most parts of their money failed. Gault and his two brothers attempted farming but abandoned it after losing about $7,000 in three years. From 1844 to 1848, Gault entered the grocery business in Montreal before finally getting the break he needed in the insurance business.

In 1851, he was appointed agent to the Mutual Life Assurance Company of New York and the Western Assurance Company of Toronto, Ontario. By the early 1860s, he was the secretary-treasurer of the Montreal Permanent Building Society, which became the Montreal Loan and Mortgage Company in 1875. He was named its president a couple of years later, a position he held until his death. Many of the investors in the syndicate which controlled the society were to remain associated with Gault in other enterprises; they comprised a cross-section of Montreal merchants, bankers, and industrialists.

From 1866 to 1870, he was the manager in Montreal of the Royal Canadian Bank of Toronto and from 1879 he was a director of the Royal Insurance Company of England. He became President of the Exchange Bank of Canada; director of the Richelieu and Ontario Navigation Company; director of the Windsor Hotel and trustee and treasurer of the Mount Royal Cemetery.

== Private life and family ==
In England, Gault was made a Freeman of the City of London. In Montreal, he was for many years a volunteer in the Garrison Artillery, and the first Captain to uniform his company at the request of Francis de Rottenburg. He founded the Irish Protestant Benevolent Society, the first of its kind in Canada. He was the warden of Christ Church Cathedral for four years and played a significant role in collecting the $44,000 to wipe off the debt on the building subscription. He was senior warden during the transfer of the building to Bishop Francis Fulford in the Consecration.

In 1854, at St. George's Church, Montreal, Matthew Hamilton Gault married Elizabeth Joanna Bourne, daughter of George Bourne. They were the parents of sixteen children, eleven of whom lived to adulthood:

- Leslie Hamilton Gault (1855-1922). He married Marion Anderson (1857-1939). They were the parents of five children, including Brigadier Sir James Frederick Gault K.C.M.G., who married Elizabeth ex-Marchioness of Townshend.
- Adelaide Stuart Gault (1857-1937), married John Smith Allan, son of Andrew Allan. They were the parents of six children.
- Emily Mary Gault (1860-1927), died unmarried.
- Lt.-Colonel The Hon. Charles Ernest Gault. In 1890, he married Florence, daughter of Rufus Fairbanks, nephew of The Hon. Charles Rufus Fairbanks and The Hon. Samuel Prescott Fairbanks.
- Margaretta Florence Gault (1864-1941). She married William Allport.
- Fanny Louisa Gault (1865-1942), married Colonel Edward Benjamin Ibbotson, J.P., of The Black Watch (Royal Highland Regiment) of Canada. They were the parents of nine children.
- Rosa Lizzie Gault (1867-1907), married Charles Heber Blackader (1852-1913), son of Francis Blackader and Margaret Drummond. They were the parents of four children.
- Perceval Ridout Gault (1869-1951), married Frances Hilda Herchmer (1873-1944), daughter of George Field Herchmer and niece of Lawrence Herchmer. They were the parents of five children.
- Mathew Henry Gault (1871-1960), married Edith Henderson (1883-1970). They were the parents of three children, Matthew Henry Gault, Leslie Henderson Gault and Patricia.
- Edythe Gault (b. 1875), married Sir Samuel Hardman Lever, 1st Bt.
- Colonel Arthur Fitzroy Gault (b. 1876), married Georgina Beemer.
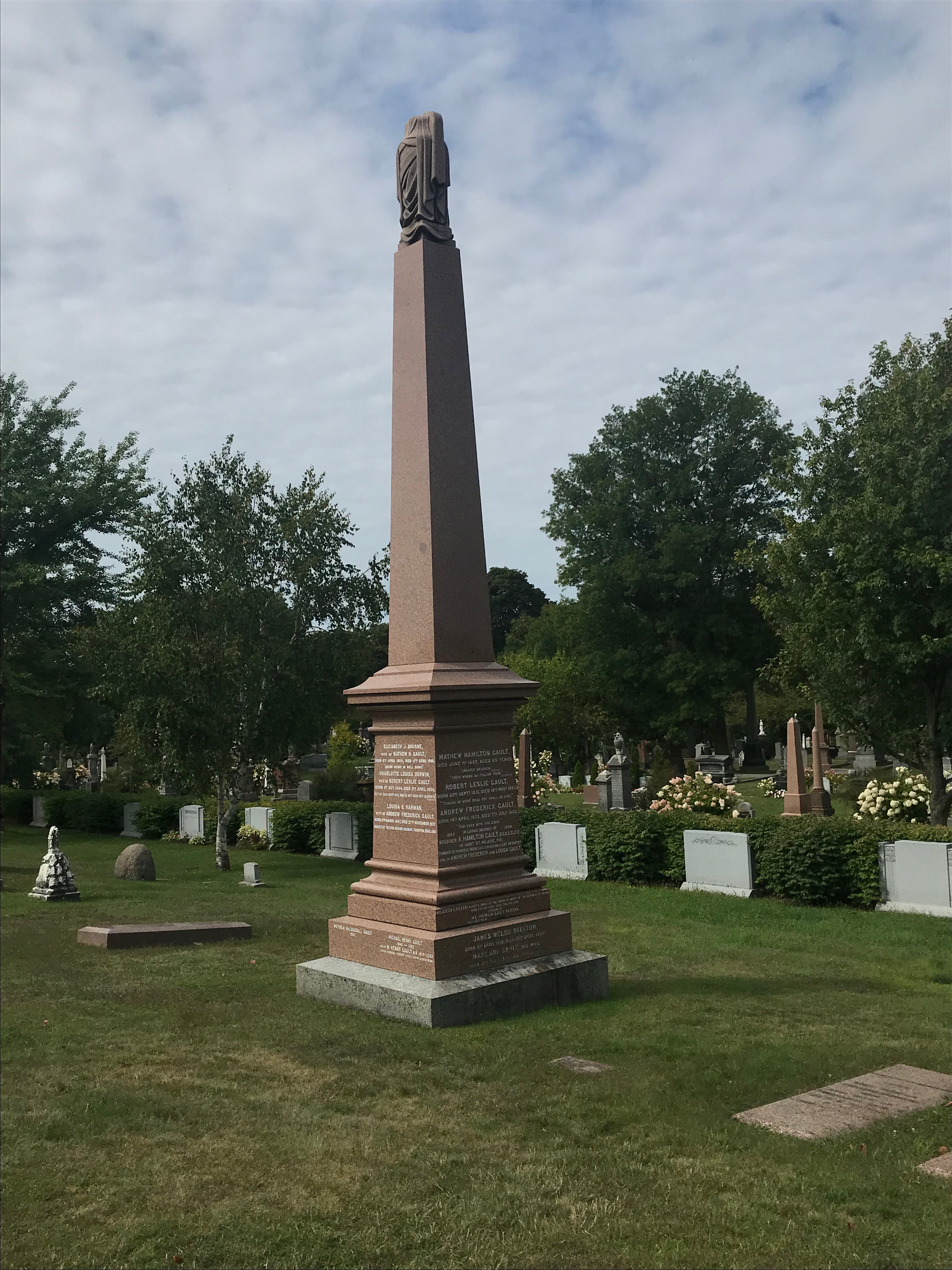
Gault's funeral monument in Mount Royal Cemetery.

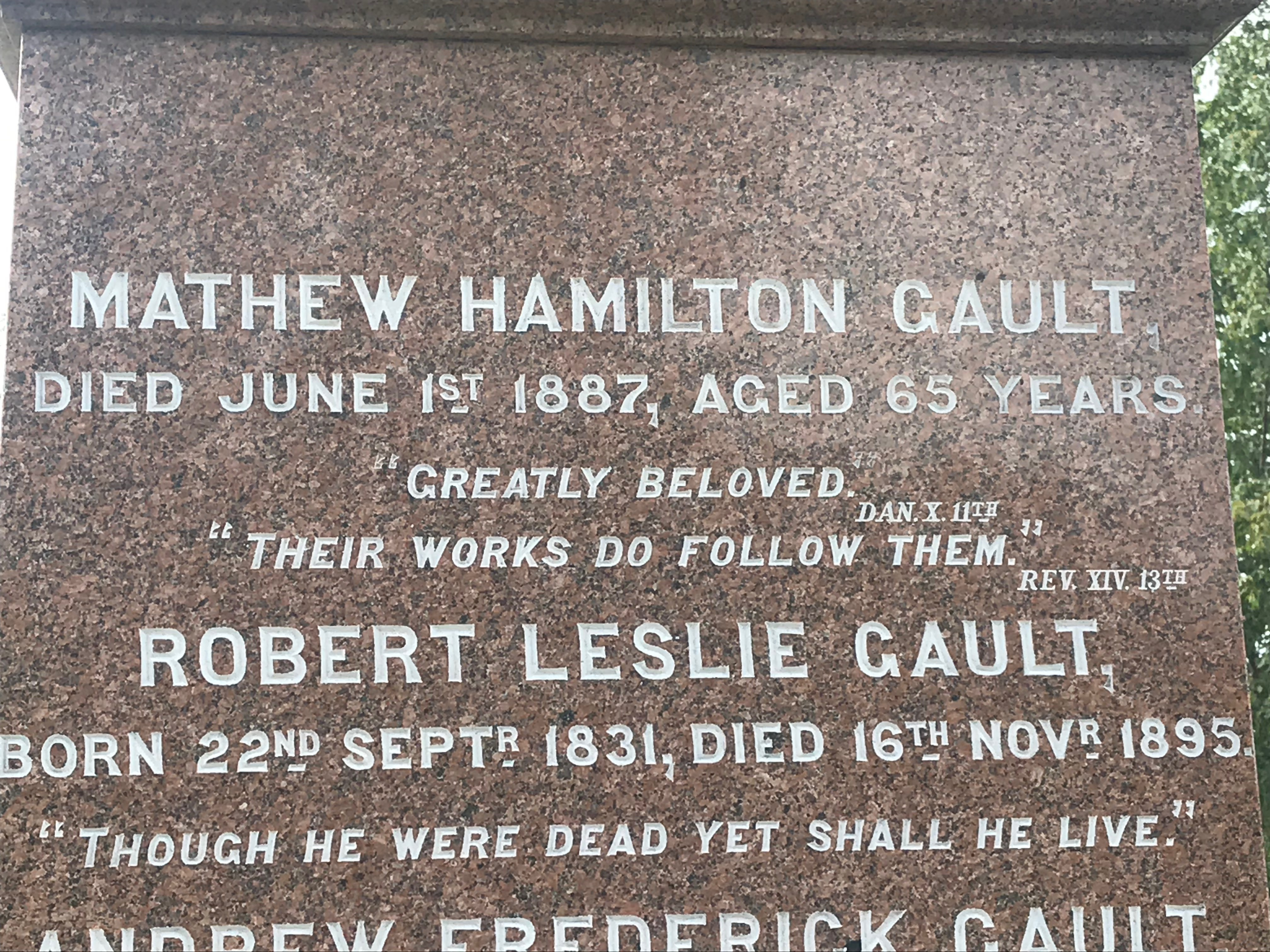
Detail of the funeral monument.

== The Belfast banking letter ==
In 1881, Matthew Hamilton Gault, then a prosperous businessman and Member of Parliament, remitted to the Belfast Banking Company (Ireland) the sum of £156.5.0. With this payment, he discharged the balance of his father's debt which, in 1842, had compelled the financially distressed Gault family to emigrate. In response, a director of the overseas bank wrote Matthew Gault a letter expressing the directorship's admiration for this "act so honourable and unusual" in the elimination of a debt that had long ago been formally written off:

The Belfast Banking Company

Belfast, 16th August 1881

Dear Sir,

The Directors of this Bank have received from their Strabane Branch your cheque for £156.5.0, the amount of debt due to this company by your father Mr. Leslie Gault so long ago as 1839 and which having been written off very many years ago, as a loss, had disappeared from our accounts and even from our memories.

The Directors consider an act so honourable and unusual deserves more than a formal acknowledgement of the receipt of the money and have much pleasure in assuring you that they appreciate your action in the highest degree as an evidence that there exists in your community a principle of honesty which is not satisfied by the discharge of one's own obligations but embraces also those of others which only in exceptional circumstances continue to be even morally binding.

The Directors beg to thank you and to wish you the prosperous career which this conduct on your part leads them to look forward to with confidence.

Yours Faithfully,

For Self & Other Directors

A. JOHNS
