= Annabel Gault =

British painter

- Born: 1952 (age 73–74)
- Education: West Surrey College of Art; Royal Academy Schools

Annabel Gault (born 1952) is a British artist. Born in Midhurst, she studied at West Surrey College of Art and Royal Academy Schools. She works in a variety of mediums, often painting landscapes. Some of her artwork has been purchased by Hampshire County Council for display in their buildings.

== Biography ==
Gault was born in Midhurst, West Sussex in 1952. Her father David Hamilton Gault and her mother Felicity Jane Gribble had five children, of whom Gault is the eldest. She studied at the West Surrey College of Art between 1973 and 1977 before training at the Royal Academy Schools until 1980.

In 1982, Gault married Johnathan Michael Franklin in London, but kept her maiden name for her work.

== Artwork and exhibitions ==
Her first group exhibition was in 1979 and her first solo exhibition was in 1981 at the Oxford Gallery. Other group shows that Gault took part in included at the Thackeray Gallery in 1989 and at Pallant House in 1993 and, in 1994, at both the City Gallery in Leicester and the Redpath Gallery in Vancouver.

Gault's work is included in the UK Government Art Collection and in Hampshire County Council Contemporary Art Collection, including 10 landscape paintings of the area round Butser Hill, to be displayed in their offices. Gault has been called "a powerfully expressive landscape painter".

In 2012, she worked on large scale black and white drawings at the Tresco Botanical Gardens, Scilly Isles. Gault worked on these pieces in a variety of mediums, including charcoal, gouache, ink and wax resist.

== Bibliography ==
- Annabel Gault: Recent Paintings (2010), introduction by Andrew Lambirth
