= Montreal Centre =

Former federal electoral district in Quebec, Canada

Quebec electoral district

Defunct federal electoral district
- Legislature: House of Commons
- District created: 1867
- District abolished: 1892
- First contested: 1867
- Last contested: 1895 by-election

Montreal Centre (French: Montréal-Centre) was a federal electoral district in Quebec, Canada, that was represented in the House of Commons of Canada from 1867 to 1892.

It was created by the British North America Act, 1867. It consisted initially of the West Ward, the Centre Ward and the East Ward of the city of Montreal. In 1872, it was redefined to consist of the Ste. Anne Ward, West Ward, Centre Ward and East Ward.

It was abolished in 1892 when it was redistributed into St. Anne and St. James ridings. Nevertheless, a by-election was held in Montreal Centre on 27 December 1895.

== Members of Parliament ==
This riding elected the following members of Parliament:

| Parliament | Years | Member | Party |
|---|---|---|---|
Montreal Centre
| 1st | 1867–1872 | Thomas Workman | Liberal |
| 2nd | 1872–1874 | Michael Patrick Ryan | Liberal–Conservative |
| 3rd | 1874–1874 | Michael Patrick Ryan | Liberal–Conservative |
| 3rd | 1875–1875 | Bernard Devlin | Liberal |
| 3rd | 1875–1878 | Bernard Devlin | Liberal |
| 4th | 1878–1882 | Michael Patrick Ryan | Liberal–Conservative |
| 5th | 1882–1887 | John Joseph Curran | Conservative |
| 6th | 1887–1891 | John Joseph Curran | Conservative |
| 7th | 1891–1892 | John Joseph Curran | Conservative |
| 7th | 1892–1895 | John Joseph Curran | Conservative |
| 7th | 1895–1896 | James McShane | Liberal |
Riding dissolved into St. Anne and St. James

== Election results ==
1867 Canadian federal election
| Party | Candidate | Votes |
|---|---|---|
| Liberal | Thomas Workman | acclaimed |
Source: Canadian Elections Database

1872 Canadian federal election
| Party | Candidate | Votes |
|---|---|---|
| Liberal–Conservative | Michael Patrick Ryan | acclaimed |
Source: Canadian Elections Database

1874 Canadian federal election
| Party | Candidate | Votes |
|---|---|---|
| Liberal–Conservative | Michael Patrick Ryan | 2,140 |
| Liberal | Bernard Devlin | 1,782 |
Source: lop.parl.ca

By-election: On election being declared void, 31 October 1874

By-election on 12 January 1875
| Party | Candidate | Votes |
| Liberal | Bernard Devlin | 2,303 |
| Liberal–Conservative | Michael Patrick Ryan | 2,220 |

By-election: On Mr. Devlin being unseated on petition, 26 August 1875

By-election on 26 November 1875
| Party | Candidate | Votes |
| Liberal | Bernard Devlin | acclaimed |

1878 Canadian federal election
| Party | Candidate | Votes |
|---|---|---|
| Liberal–Conservative | Michael Patrick Ryan | 2,624 |
| Liberal | Bernard Devlin | 1,845 |

1882 Canadian federal election
| Party | Candidate | Votes |
|---|---|---|
| Conservative | John Joseph Curran | 2,654 |
| Unknown | W. Farrell | 1,367 |

1887 Canadian federal election
| Party | Candidate | Votes |
|---|---|---|
| Conservative | John Joseph Curran | 3,116 |
| Liberal | Henry Joseph Cloran | 2,185 |

1891 Canadian federal election
| Party | Candidate | Votes |
|---|---|---|
| Conservative | John Joseph Curran | 3,450 |
| Unknown | E. W. P. Guérin | 2,236 |

By-election: On Mr. Curran being appointed Solicitor General, 5 December 1892

By-election on 18 December 1892
| Party | Candidate | Votes |
| Conservative | John Joseph Curran | acclaimed |

By-election: On Mr. Curran being appointed Puisne Judge of the Superior Court of Quebec, 18 October 1895

By-election on 27 December 1895
| Party | Candidate | Votes |
| Liberal | James McShane | acclaimed |

== See also ==
- List of Canadian electoral districts
- Historical federal electoral districts of Canada
