= Montreal West (electoral district) =

Former federal electoral district in Quebec, Canada

Quebec electoral district

Defunct federal electoral district
- Legislature: House of Commons
- District created: 1867
- District abolished: 1892
- First contested: 1867
- Last contested: 1891

Montreal West (French: Montréal-Ouest, pronounced [mɔ̃ʁeal wɛst]) was a federal electoral district in Quebec, Canada, that was represented in the House of Commons of Canada from 1867 to 1892.

It was created by the British North America Act, 1867. It consisted initially of St. Anne Ward, St. Antoine Ward and St. Lawrence Ward. In 1872, St. Anne Ward was removed from the riding. It was abolished in 1892 when it was redistributed into St. Antoine and St. Lawrence ridings.

== Members of Parliament ==
This riding elected the following members of Parliament:

Parliament	Years	Member	Party
Montreal West
1st	1867–1868	Thomas D'Arcy McGee	Liberal–Conservative
1st	1867–1872	Michael Patrick Ryan	Liberal–Conservative
2nd	1872–1874	John Young	Liberal
3rd	1874–1874	Frederick Mackenzie	Liberal
3rd	1874–1875	Frederick Mackenzie	Liberal
3rd	1875–1878	Thomas Workman	Liberal
4th	1878–1882	Matthew Hamilton Gault	Conservative
5th	1882–1887	Matthew Hamilton Gault	Conservative
6th	1887–1891	Donald Smith	Independent Conservative
7th	1891–1896	Donald Smith	Independent Conservative
Riding dissolved into St. Antoine and St. Lawrence

== Election results ==
1867 Canadian federal election
Party	Candidate	Votes
Liberal–Conservative	Thomas D'Arcy McGee	2,676
Liberal	Bernard Devlin	2,477
Source: Canadian Elections Database

By-election: On Mr. McGee being assassinated, 7 April 1868

By-election on 20 April 1868
Party	Candidate	Votes
Liberal–Conservative	Michael Patrick Ryan	acclaimed

1872 Canadian federal election
Party	Candidate	Votes
Liberal	John Young	2,138
Unknown	George Alexander Drummond	1,322
Source: Canadian Elections Database

1874 Canadian federal election
Party	Candidate	Votes
Liberal	Frederick Mackenzie	2,036
Unknown	A. A. Stevenson	1,442
Source: lop.parl.ca

By-election: On election being declared void, 22 October 1874

By-election on 10 December 1874
Party	Candidate	Votes
Liberal	Frederick Mackenzie	2,030
Unknown	Thomas White Jr.	2,023

By-election: On election being declared void, 14 August 1875

By-election on 30 October 1875
Party	Candidate	Votes
Liberal	Thomas Workman	2,300
Unknown	Thomas White Jr.	2,250

1878 Canadian federal election
Party	Candidate	Votes
Conservative	Matthew Hamilton Gault	3,334
Unknown	Wm. Darling	1,627

1882 Canadian federal election
Party	Candidate	Votes
Conservative	Matthew Hamilton Gault	2,707
Unknown	J. K. Ward	1,960

1887 Canadian federal election
Party	Candidate	Votes
Independent Conservative	Donald Smith	3,908
Liberal	J. K. Ward	2,458

1891 Canadian federal election
Party	Candidate	Votes
Independent Conservative	Donald Smith	4,586
Liberal	James Cochrane	880

== See also ==
- List of Canadian electoral districts
- Historical federal electoral districts of Canada
