= Thomas Workman (Canadian politician) =

Canadian politician

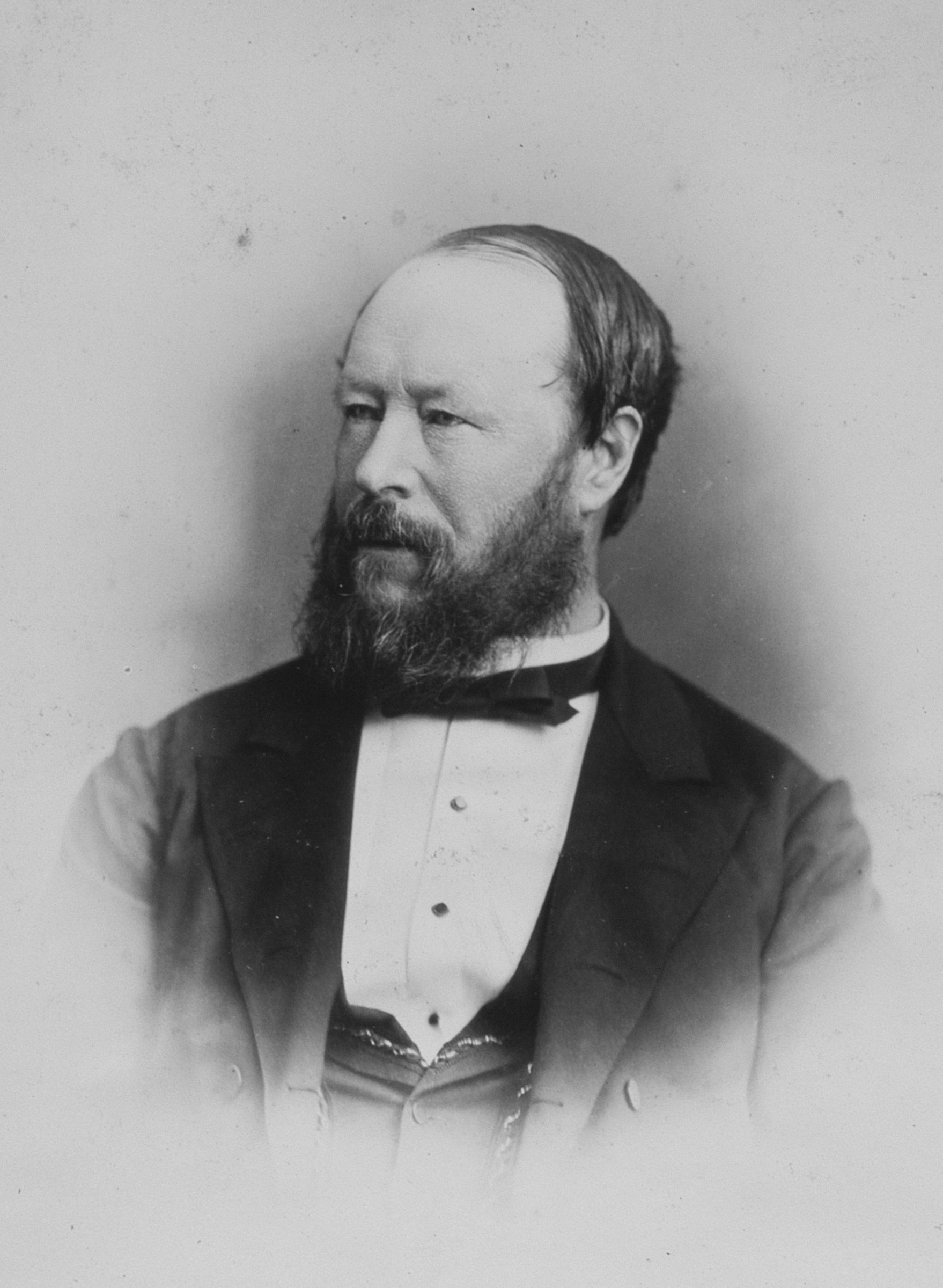
- Workman in 1869

Member of the Canadian Parliament for Montreal Centre
- In office 1867–1872
- Succeeded by: Michael Patrick Ryan

Member of the Canadian Parliament for Montreal West
- In office 1875–1878
- Preceded by: Frederick Mackenzie
- Succeeded by: Matthew Hamilton Gault

Personal details
- Born: June 17, 1813 Ballymacash, Ireland
- Died: October 9, 1889 (aged 76) Montreal, Quebec
- Resting place: Mount Royal Cemetery
- Party: Liberal

Thomas Workman (June 17, 1813 – October 9, 1889) was a Quebec businessman and political figure. He represented Montreal Centre in the 1st Canadian Parliament and Montreal West from 1875 to 1878 as a Liberal member.

== Biography ==
He was born in Ballymacash, Ireland in 1813 and came to Montreal, where his brothers had already settled, in 1827. In 1834, he was hired as a clerk in a hardware company operated by John Frothingham and his brother William; he became a partner in 1843 and sole owner in 1859. He also served as president of the Molson Bank and a director of the Sun Mutual Life Insurance Company in Montreal, serving as president from 1871 to 1889. He served as a volunteer to help put down the Lower Canada Rebellion. In 1866, he was named justice of the peace.

=== House of Commons ===
He was elected to the House of Commons in 1867, but did not run again until an 1875 by-election in Montreal West after the sitting member was unseated.

=== Death and burial ===
He died from diabetes in Montreal in 1889. He is interred in Montreal's Mount Royal Cemetery.

== Legacy ==
He had supported McGill College during his life and left a large sum from his estate to the college and other charities.

1867 Canadian federal election: Montreal Centre
Party	Candidate	Votes
Liberal	Thomas Workman	acclaimed
Source: Canadian Elections Database
