= Archibald McNab =

Canadian politician

Archibald McNab (January 20, 1826 – July 16, 1904) was a Canadian businessman and political figure. He represented Glengarry in the House of Commons of Canada as a Liberal member from 1875 to 1878.

== Biography ==
He was born in Breadalbane, Glengarry County, Upper Canada in 1826, the son of Alexander McNab and Catherine McDougall, Scottish immigrants. Early in his career, McNab farmed and was involved in the lumber trade. In 1851, he married Margaret McArthur. He served on the council for Lochiel Township for 21 years, much of that time as reeve, and also served as warden for the United Counties of Stormont, Dundas and Glengarry. He was a director of the Montreal and City of Ottawa Junction Railway. McNab ran unsuccessfully twice for a seat in the Ontario assembly. He was elected to the House of Commons in a by-election held after Donald Alexander Macdonald was named Lieutenant-Governor of Ontario, was unseated after an appeal and elected again in the by-election that followed. In 1887, he was named license inspector for Glengarry and, in 1897, sheriff for Stormont, Dundas and Glengarry. He died at Bredalbane in 1904.
