= Frederick Mackenzie (Quebec politician) =

Canadian politician

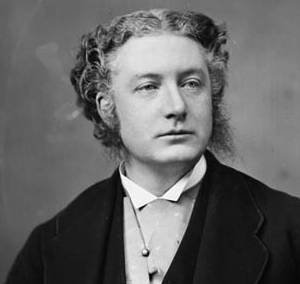

Member of the Canadian Parliament for Montreal West
- In office 1874–1875
- Preceded by: John Young
- Succeeded by: Thomas Workman

Personal details
- Born: April 10, 1841 Montreal, Canada East
- Died: July 2, 1889 (aged 48) Boston, Massachusetts
- Party: Liberal

Frederick Mackenzie (April 10, 1841 – July 2, 1889) was a lawyer and politician in Quebec.

== Biography ==
He was born in 1841 at Sherbrooke Street in Montreal. He was the son of John Gordon Mackenzie (1796–1881), a wealthy dry goods merchant and native of Dingwall. Mackenzie's mother was a daughter of the Hon. Horatio Yates. Mackenzie was educated at McGill University and was called to the Lower Canada bar in 1862.

Frederick Mackenzie was a captain in the militia and served during the Fenian raids. He was a lay secretary for the Church of England in Quebec and Montreal. His election in 1874 was declared void by reason of bribery by his agents; he was elected again in a by-election held in December that year. That election was also declared void and Thomas Workman was elected in a by-election held the following year.

Mackenzie represented Montreal West in the House of Commons of Canada from 1874 to 1875 as a Liberal member.
