= James Gault =

British brigadier and military assistant

Sir James Gault

Brigadier Sir James Frederick Gault KCMG MVO OBE (26 June 1902 – 14 January 1977) was a British brigadier and military assistant to General Dwight Eisenhower in the UK during World War II.

James Gault was the son of Leslie Hamilton Gault (1855–1922) and Marion Anderson (1857–1939), one of five children. He was the grandson of Matthew Hamilton Gault. He was educated at Eton College and Trinity College, Cambridge.

Gault was a member of the Scots Guards regiment and served in the Middle East (Egypt and Libya). He was made an MBE in 1941, a Member of the Royal Victorian Order in 1943, an OBE in 1946, and a KCMG in 1952.

James Gault married Elizabeth Pamela Audrey Luby (died 1989), former wife of George Townshend, 7th Marquess Townshend.

During the 1950s, he resided in a house in Milford, Surrey that was built by Major C F Dingwall in 1930.
