= Benjamin True Gault =

American ornithologist and botanical collector (1859–1942)

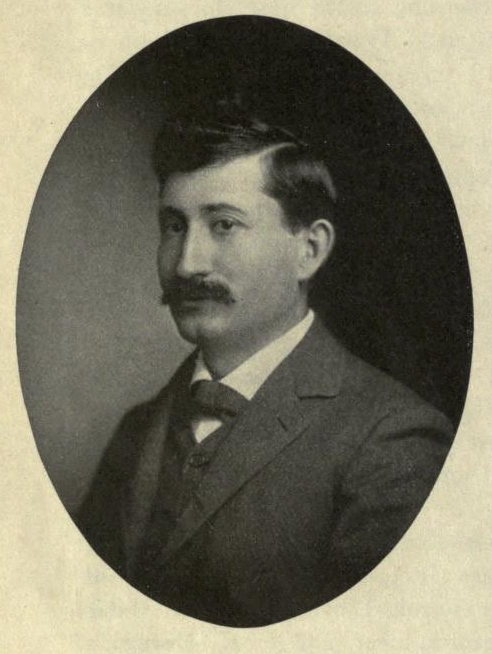

Benjamin True Gault (2 November 1858 – 20 March 1942) was an American ornithologist and bird conservationist. He collected bird eggs and skins many of which were donated to the Field Museum of Natural History. His notes and photographs at the Chicago Academy of Sciences have served as indicators of bird life in his period.

Gault was born in Decatur, Illinois to James Cochran and Mary True née Dudley. In later life he noted that his father knew Abraham Lincoln personally. He became interested in the birds of the region and also travelled through southern California in 1883. He also observed birds in Arkansas and Texas in 1888. He collected specimens, making trips to Missouri in 1892 and 1894. He was offered a position with the British Museum in 1924 which he declined. He was a noted field ornithologist and was a member of the American Ornithological Union, the Cooper Ornithological Society and the Wilson Ornithological Club. He lived in Chicago with his mother until her death and then moved to live in Glen Ellyn from 1928. His collections of photographs, film and notes have been used for studies on the bird life of the period. Gault had observed passenger pigeons in Atkin County, Minnesota and in Illinois in 1892. In 1937 his fans began a Benjamin T. Gault bird club at Glen Ellyn sanctuary. Gault died at Glen Ellyn and was buried in Forest Hill Cemetery. A Benjamin Gault Bird Sanctuary was established in 1831 at Glen Ellyn.
