= Michael Patrick Ryan =

Canadian politician (1825–1893)

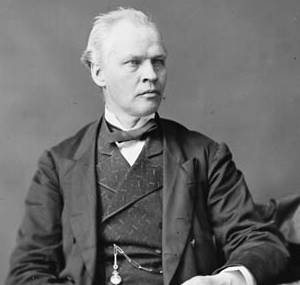

Member of the Canadian Parliament for Montreal West
- In office 1868–1872
- Preceded by: D'Arcy McGee
- Succeeded by: John Young

Member of the Canadian Parliament for Montreal Centre
- In office 1872–1875
- Preceded by: Thomas Workman
- Succeeded by: Bernard Devlin
- In office 1878–1882
- Preceded by: Bernard Devlin
- Succeeded by: John Joseph Curran

Personal details
- Born: 29 September 1825 Pallis, Donohill, County Tipperary, Ireland
- Died: 18 January 1893 (aged 67) Montreal, Quebec, Canada
- Party: Liberal-Conservative
- Spouse: Margaret Brennan

Michael Patrick Ryan (29 September 1825 – 18 January 1893) was an Irish-born Canadian businessman and political figure. He represented Montreal West in the 1st Canadian Parliament and Montreal Centre in the House of Commons of Canada from 1872 to 1874 and from 1879 to 1882 as a Liberal-Conservative member.

He was born in Pallis, Donohill, County Tipperary, in Ireland in 1825, the son of William Ryan, and came to Lower Canada with his family in 1840, settling near Chambly. He became a merchant in Montreal. In 1850, he married Margaret Brennan. He was elected to the city council in 1852 and served as captain in the local militia. Ryan also was a member of the Council of the Board of Trade in Montreal and a director for the Montreal, Ottawa and Occidental Railway.

Following the assassination of Liberal-Conservative Member of Parliament Thomas D'Arcy McGee in April 1868, Ryan was selected by the party to run in the ensuing by-election. Due to the circumstances of the by-election Ryan's candidacy was unopposed and he was elected to the House of Commons by acclamation.

Ryan retired from business in 1875. In 1882, he was named customs collector at Montreal and served in that post until his death in January 1893.

1874 Canadian federal election: Montreal Centre
Party	Candidate	Votes
Liberal–Conservative	Michael Patrick Ryan	2,140
Liberal	Bernard Devlin	1,782
Source: lop.parl.ca

By-election: On election being declared void, 31 October 1874

By-election on 12 January 1875
Party	Candidate	Votes
Liberal	Bernard Devlin	2,303
Liberal–Conservative	Michael Patrick Ryan	2,220
