= Peter White (Canadian politician) =

Canadian politician

The Hon. Peter White P.C.
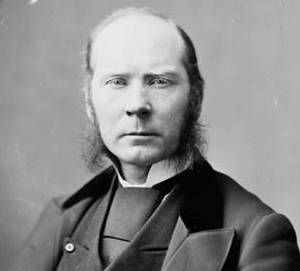

6th Speaker of the House of Commons of Canada
- In office July 29, 1891 – August 18, 1896
- Preceded by: Joseph-Aldric Ouimet
- Succeeded by: James David Edgar

Member of the Canadian Parliament for Renfrew North
- In office 1874–1874
- Preceded by: James Findaly
- Succeeded by: William Murray
- In office 1876–1896
- Preceded by: William Murray
- Succeeded by: Thomas Mackie
- In office 1904–1906
- Preceded by: Thomas Mackie
- Succeeded by: Gerald Verner White

Personal details
- Born: August 30, 1838 Pembroke, Upper Canada
- Died: May 3, 1906 (aged 67)
- Party: Conservative

Peter White, PC (August 30, 1838 – May 3, 1906) was a Canadian parliamentarian.

White was born into a family that had established its homestead at the junction of the Muskrat and Ottawa Rivers where the town of Pembroke, Ontario was soon established. His family established several businesses including a lumberyard, general store and blacksmith's shop.

As a young man, White and his brother took over the family business and became wealthy as they supplied the steam engine industries. He also became a major shareholder and president of the Pembroke Company.

White entered politics and became reeve of Pembroke Township in 1870. He first ran for the House of Commons of Canada as a Conservative candidate in the 1872 federal election in the riding of Renfrew North but was defeated. He won election in the 1874 election, but his victory was overturned by the courts, and he lost the subsequent by-election that was held later that year. He was elected in a subsequent 1876 by-election, again won election in the 1878 election, and sat in the House of Commons of Canada for the next twenty years. A supporter of Sir John A. Macdonald, White was a believer in the National Policy.

Following the 1891 election, Macdonald nominated White to be Speaker of the House of Commons of Canada. Macdonald died soon after, and White presided over a tumultuous period in the House of Commons as a succession of Conservative Prime Ministers attempted to hold the party and government together in the absence of the party's long time leader. Debates over the Manitoba Schools Question were particularly divisive, and brought down the government of Sir Mackenzie Bowell. White opposed the government's policy that favoured Catholic education rights as he believed that it interfered with the provincial government's right to set education policy, but, as Speaker, remained silent on the issue until the 1896 election campaign. Despite his independence on the issue, White lost his seat in the election and failed in several attempts to return to the House until the 1904 election when he finally regained a seat. By this time, he was in declining health, and was unable to regularly attend House sittings. He died in office in 1906.
