= Independent candidates in the 2003 Ontario provincial election =

Twenty-four candidates appeared on the ballot as independents in the 2003 provincial election in Ontario, Canada. Of these, ten were Independent Renewal candidates affiliated with the Communist Party of Canada (Marxist-Leninist), one was an Independent Reformer, and one a member of the Communist League. The other eleven appear to have been fully independent candidates, unaligned with any registered or unregistered party.

== Candidates ==
District	Candidate	Votes	Notes
Brant	John Turmel	295	
Davenport	David Senater	293	
Etobicoke North	Frank M. Acri	1,990	
Kitchener—Waterloo	Owen Alastair Ferguson	242	
Lambton—Kent—Middlesex	James Armstrong	1,053	
Ottawa Centre	Fakhry Guirguis	214	
Ottawa West—Nepean	Robert Gilles Gauthier	353	
Peterborough	Bob Bowers	178	
Simcoe North	Karnail Singh	101	
Stormont—Dundas—Charlottenburgh	Gary R. Besner	968	
Toronto—Danforth	Mehmet Ali Yagiz	73	
