= William Weir (businessman) =

Scottish-Canadian businessman (1823–1905)

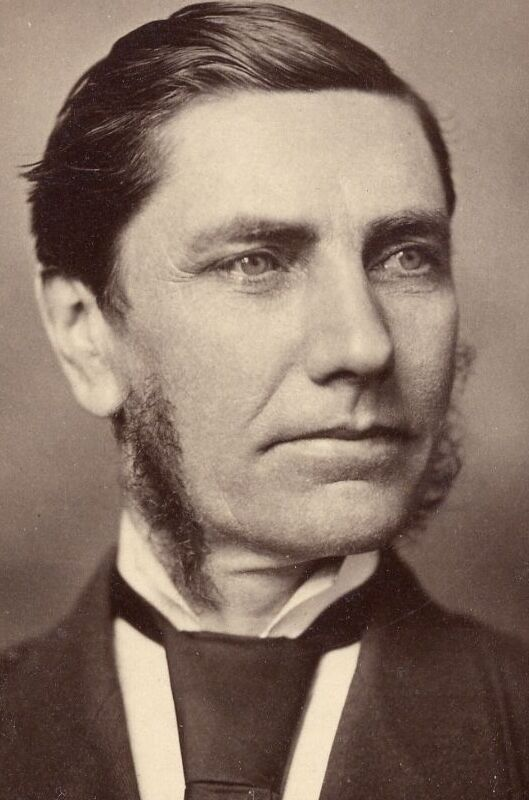
- Born: October 28, 1823; Greenden, Scotland, United Kingdom
- Died: March 25, 1905 (aged 81); Ottawa, Ontario, Canada
- Occupation: Businessman
- Criminal charges: Submitting false information to the government
- Criminal penalty: 2 years in prison

William Weir (28 October 1823 – 25 March 1905) was a Scottish-Canadian businessman. He helped solve the Silver Nuisance. He was involved in running the Jacques-Cartier and Ville-Marie banks.

== Biography ==
William Weir was born on 28 October 1823 in Greenden, Scotland. He received a good education as a child before becoming a shop-boy in Brechin around 1837. He then became a census enumerator in 1841 and subsequently a clerk in 1841-1842.

In spring 1842, Weir left for Lower Canada. On arriving, he lived with an uncle in Lachute. He was a teacher at Chatham Township and then moved to Saint-Laurent, Montreal after learning French. There, he was a bookkeeper in the office of merchant Daniel McDonald. In 1847, Weir became a commission merchant. His affairs likely did not fare too well, as he frequently changed business. He was an exchange broker in 1849 and a leather goods seller in 1852. In 1849, Weir signed the Annexation Manifesto after the repeal of the Corn Laws.

He moved to Toronto in 1856 and became publisher of the Canadian Merchants’ Magazine and Commercial Review. He partnered with Ebenezer Clemo in 1858 or 1859 as commission brokers and manufacturers’ agents. Both the magazine and the partnership were broken off at the end of 1859, and Weir returned to Montreal.

Weir gradually became more supportive of protectionism in the 1850s. Weir initially supported the establishment of free trade or a reciprocal tariff with the United States because of the weak demand in Canada's domestic market. When that seemed unlikely in 1858, after an economic downturn, he became a supporter of protectionism.

He was secretary to two lobby groups for higher tariffs, the Association for the Promotion of Canadian Industry and the Tariff Reform Association. Weir strongly approved of Alexander Tilloch Galt raising tariffs in 1859. His close involvement with protectionism ended in the 1850s, but he was still lobbying the government on the subject in the late 1890s.

Back in Montreal, Weir became a broker. He ran the firm Weir and Larminie from 1862 until its dissolution in 1864. He launched a paper venture with Isaac Buchanan in the early 1860s. He had a strong friendship with Buchanan until the latter's death in 1883.

=== Solving the Silver Nuisance (1869–1871) ===
Weir then played a role in solving the Silver Nuisance. Large amounts of American silver coins flooded Canada after suspension of specie payments in the United States in 1862, and was used somewhat regularly in retail transactions and wages payment.

The Canadian government exported one million dollars worth of silver coins in 1868 to New York. In 1869, private interests exported two million dollars worth of silver coins with Weir as broker. Weir assumed the risks and costs of such an export. Weir worked with Francis Hincks in early 1870 on solving this issue.

Weir was named the government's agent for the export of American silver coins, and given the authority to do so. Silver coins would be accepted at a discount, which would rise after some time. The coins would then be exported by banks recruited by Weir. Under this plan, over 7 million dollars worth of silver was exported. Weir was awarded a silver tea service for his efforts.

=== Banking career (1871–1901) ===
By 1871, Weir had become a banker. A self-proclaimed francophile, he became involved in the French banks of Quebec.

==== Banque Jacques-Cartier ====
After the Banque Jacques-Cartier suspended operations in 1875 due to mismanagement, Weir bought some of its depreciated shares. He became an influential shareholder; he was part of a 1878 six-members shareholders' committee to examine the bank's books, was elected to the board of directors in 1879 and became vice-president in 1880.

Weir encouraged the federal government to appoint bank commissioneers to verify statements submitted by banks, claiming those were unreliable. According to him, the troubles of the Jacques-Cartier and other banks would thus have been avoided or lessened.

Weir left the Jacques-Cartier to run the Banque Ville-Marie.

==== Banque Ville-Marie ====
In 1880, Weir obtained a considerable amount of the Banque Ville-Marie's shares. After its suspension in 1879, Weir pushed other shareholders to reopen the bank and resume operations instead of liquidating it, to success in early 1881. After becoming the biggest shareholder, Weir became member of the bank's board of directors in January 1881 and then president in June 1881.

From 1881 to 1899, Weir operated the Banque Ville-Marie "as if it was his own private property". The French-speaking directors were replaced by his friends, who used the bank's ressources for themselves. Under Weir, all of the bank's deposits were loaned. In 1892, Weir also made himself the bank's cashier. Without any scrutiny, Weir and his friends made loans to inexistant firms and pocketed the proceeds, or simply appropriated bank funds.

News that a bank official had fled with funds caused a bank run in July 1899, and the Banque Ville-Marie suspended operations. It would never reopen. Depositors obtained less than 20 cents per dollar deposited, and resented Weir. Weir went on trial in November 1899 for submitting false information to the government. It was falsely claimed that a 10,000$ reserve fund existed, and current loans were reported at 1,400,000$ whereas 400,000$ of these loans were bad debts. It took a jury only 15 minutes to convict Weir, who was sentenced two years in jail.

Weir's mental health degraded around this time, notably due to the difficulties in solving the silver nuisance and his son's suicide in 1900. A trial of Weir and other directors for conspiracy scheduled for April 1901 was delayed due to his mental health, and ultimately never happened.

In the mid-1880s, Weir had also formed W. Weir and Sons with two of his sons, which operated until 1899.

In 1895 he had been named by the bankers’ section of the Montreal Board of Trade to a committee that was to discuss the problem of American silver circulation in Canada with the federal government. He also offered his services to William Stevens Fielding in 1896 to solve this issue.

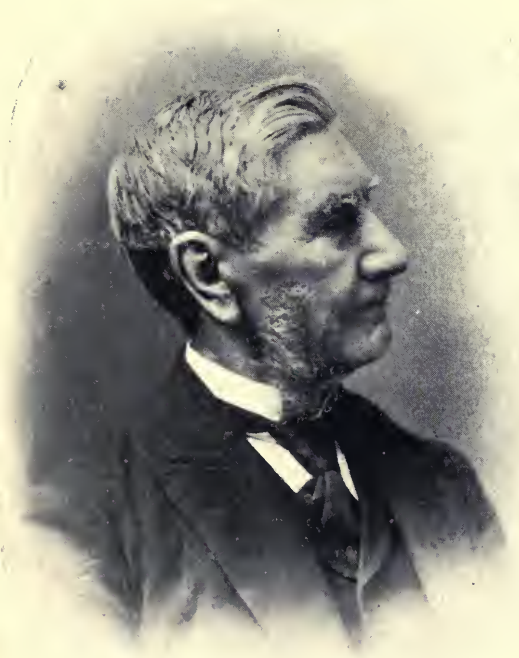
William Weir, photo from Sixty years in Canada

=== Later life (1901-1905) ===
Weir was freed from prison in fall 1901. In 1904, he offered his services to William Stevens Fielding in solving the problems of American silver circulation, but was rejected. Just before his death, he wrote and published Sixty years in Canada.

William Weir died on 25 March 1905 in Ottawa.
