= Gerald Verner White =

Canadian politician

The Honourable Gerald Verner White CBE
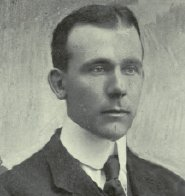

Member of Parliament for Renfrew North
- In office 1906–1917
- Preceded by: Peter White
- Succeeded by: Herbert John Mackie

Canadian Senator from Ontario
- In office 1919–1948
- Appointed by: Robert Borden

Personal details
- Born: July 6, 1879 Pembroke, Ontario, Canada
- Died: October 24, 1948 (aged 69)
- Party: Conservative
- Relations: Peter White, father
- Occupation: Mining engineer
- Portfolio: Opposition Whip in the Senate

Gerald Verner White CBE (July 6, 1879 – October 24, 1948) was a Canadian politician.

== Background ==
Born in Pembroke, Ontario, the son of Peter White and Janet Reid White, White was educated at Pembroke Public and High Schools. He received a Bachelor of Science in Mining Engineering degree in 1901 from McGill University. He entered the lumber business, eventually becoming president of the Cunningham Lumber Company and the Pembroke Standard, Limited.

He was first elected to the House of Commons of Canada for Renfrew North in a 1906 by-election after the death of his father. A Conservative, he was re-elected in 1908 and 1911. During World War I, he was a Colonel, Officer Reserve in the Canadian Expeditionary Force. He was appointed a Commander of the Order of the British Empire in the 1918 New Year Honours for his efforts during the war.

He was appointed to the Senate of Canada for the senatorial division of Pembroke, Ontario on the advice of Robert Borden in 1917. He served until his death in 1948.
