= Cheryl Gallant =

Canadian politician

Cheryl Gallant MP
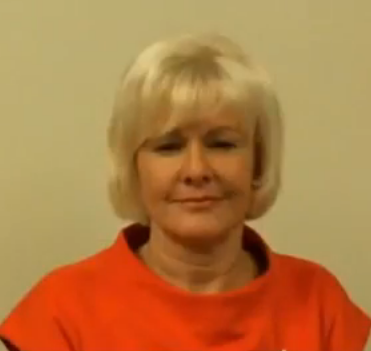

Member of Parliament for Algonquin—Renfrew—Pembroke Renfrew—Nipissing—Pembroke (2000–2025)
- Incumbent
- Assumed office November 27, 2000
- Preceded by: Hec Clouthier

Personal details
- Born: May 23, 1960 (age 66) Sarnia, Ontario, Canada
- Party: Conservative (since 2003)
- Other political affiliations: Alliance (2000–2003)
- Spouse: Jamie Gallant
- Education: University of Western Ontario (BSc)
- Profession: Biochemist; Insurance Executive

Cheryl Gallant MP (born May 23, 1960) is a Canadian politician who represents the riding of Renfrew—Nipissing—Pembroke in the House of Commons of Canada. She is a member of the Conservative Party of Canada. Along with fellow MP Scott Reid, they are the longest-serving current Conservative MPs, and the last two MPs still serving who were members of the Canadian Alliance.

== Early life and career ==
Gallant was born in Sarnia, Ontario. She attended the University of Western Ontario, graduating with a Bachelor of Science degree in chemistry. Prior to becoming a politician, she worked for a major Canadian life insurance company as a group insurance executive and for a time as an office manager of a family-owned professional practice. Gallant has been married since 1985, and is the parent of four daughters. She has served as the Chair of the City of Pembroke Downtown Development Commission and as a member of the Economic Advisory Committee for the city.

== Political career ==
Gallant won her seat in the 2000 federal election, defeating Liberal incumbent Hec Clouthier and making history as the first woman elected to federal office in Renfrew County. Renfrew-Nipissing-Pembroke was one of only three Ontario federal riding districts not to elect a Liberal. Gallant took advantage of local opposition to Bill C-68, the Firearms Act, and benefited from backlash to Clouthier's support for gun control.

She is currently a member of the Conservative Party of Canada in the House of Commons of Canada, having previously been a member of the Canadian Alliance party from 2000 to 2003. She is largely viewed as one of the most vocal social conservatives in the House of Commons. While a popular figure among the Christian Right and property rights activists, she regularly draws the ire of opponents. Serving in a riding with the largest military base and only national nuclear research facility in Canada, she has advocated for increased federal support for CFB Petawawa and the Chalk River Laboratories.

During the 37th Parliament, Gallant served as deputy house leader of the Official Opposition. She has served as CPC critic for science, research and development, was a member of the Commons Standing Committee on National Defence and Veteran's Affairs, and the Standing Committee on Industry. She has also served as opposition critic of Canadian Heritage, Amateur Sport, the National Capital Commission, Science, Research and Development, the Federal Economic Development Initiative for Northern Ontario, and Small Business.

In the 38th Parliament, Gallant served as a member on the Subcommittee on Agenda and Procedure of the Standing Joint Committee on Library of Parliament, and the Library of Parliament.

Her service continued in the 39th Parliament, where she served on the committee for the Status of Women, National Defence, and Library of Parliament.

In the 2008 election, Gallant won her fourth term in Parliament, winning 28,906 of 47,314 votes (61.1% of the total). Her nearest rival, Liberal candidate Carole Devine, received 9,740 votes (20.6%).

During the 40th Parliament, she served for varying lengths of time as a member on the following committees: National Defence, the Library of Parliament, the Subcommittee on Agenda and Procedure on the Standing Committee on National Defence, Scrutiny of Regulations, Natural Resources, and Transport, Infrastructure, and Communities.

In the 2011 election, Gallant won her fifth term in Parliament in a landslide election, collecting 27,462 of 51,398 votes (53.43% of the total). Her closest opponent, Independent Hec Clouthier, received 9,611 votes (18.70%).

During the 41st Parliament, Gallant served as a member of the Standing Committee on Industry, Science, and Technology, as well as the Standing Committee on National Defence. She was elected by colleagues to represent Canada as Chair of the Canadian-North Atlantic Treaty Organization (NATO) Parliamentary Association. The Canada-NATO Parliamentary Association consists of membership of all political parties represented in the House of Commons.

In March 2012, Gallant traveled to Norway to observe Canadian Forces from Petawawa participate in NATO exercises. In April 2012, she received second place in The Hill Times poll for Best Conservative Constituency MP.

Gallant was re-elected for a sixth term in the 2015 election. In a statement on April 2, 2019, Gallant addressed the Speaker in the House regarding carbon pricing in Canada stating that the effects would necessitate higher tuition fees on college and university students to make up for increased heating and carbon payments.

Gallant was challenged for the Conservative nomination in Renfrew—Nipissing—Pembroke for the 2019 election by Mike Coates, the campaign manager for former Conservative leadership candidate Kevin O'Leary. However, Gallant was successful in winning the nomination 866 votes to 522.

On October 21, 2019, Gallant was re-elected for her seventh term in office after winning 30,387 of 57,506 ballots cast, or 52.67% of the vote. She is the longest serving woman in the federal caucus. During the ensuing 43rd Canadian Parliament, she introduced one private member bill, Bill C-222, An Act to amend the Expropriation Act (protection of private property) which sought to disallow the exemption of a public hearing in cases where private land is being expropriated for the purposes of "restoring historical natural habitats or addressing, directly or indirectly, climate variability". It was brought to a vote on February 17, 2021, but defeated with only Conservatives Party members voting in favour. In the 2020 Conservative Party of Canada leadership election she endorsed Peter MacKay.

She won re-election in the 2021 election, despite being "nowhere to be found" during the campaign, according to CTV News Ottawa. During the campaign, Gallant claimed "Now that the pandemic is passing, they’re rebranding climate change as a climate emergency in order to justify climate lockdowns." The claim was cited by Prime Minister Justin Trudeau as an example of a need for Conservative leader Erin O'Toole to control his candidates.

== Controversies ==
In 2002, she made anti-gay remarks to then Minister of Foreign Affairs Bill Graham, when during a heated exchange, she shouted "Ask your boyfriend" and "How's your boyfriend?".

Shortly before the 2004 election, Gallant made headlines for her criticism of Bill C-250, an amendment to the Criminal Code, introduced by NDP MP Svend Robinson which would protect sexual orientation from hate propaganda. Among other things, Gallant claimed that the bill would limit freedom of opinion, make sections of the Bible "hate literature" and provide protection to pedophiles.

During the 2004 election, a controversy erupted when Gallant compared abortion to the beheading of Iraq War hostage Nick Berg. The Conservative Party then announced that she was suffering from laryngitis, and after this, she did not appear at some scheduled debates.

Gallant resurfaced in the spotlight on March 17, 2005, when she suggested that Christians were being persecuted by the Liberal Party in a flyer she sent to her constituents. Conservative leader Stephen Harper, confronted with the news, said "I'll let Cheryl Gallant explain those remarks herself; I haven't seen them."

Several constituents have accused Gallant of obtaining birth-date information from passport applications during the 2006 campaign. Her office regularly sent out greeting cards to constituents when their birthday came. One affected resident told the Ottawa Citizen, "The principle is really bothering me: that my information has been gathered without my knowledge. I don't know how it's going to be used." Two families who received cards have sent letters to the Privacy Commissioner of Canada, asking confirmation the MP won't use the collected personal information. The Office of the Privacy Commissioner has no jurisdiction in investigating such matters. Gallant's aide says the Member receives many requests for birthday and anniversary cards, and the office is unsure how the information was put on the list, since Gallant receives thousands of requests for salutations and the birth date could have been on one of the request forms returned by a constituent. In addition, two constituents named Mr. and Mrs. White, who were unsatisfied with the response they received from Gallant's office, contacted the Liberal MP for Ottawa-Vanier Mauril Bélanger. Bélanger contacted the Office of the Ethics Commissioner on their behalf, who found grounds for and did conduct a preliminary inquiry into the matter. Although in their report they commented "personal information should only be used for the purpose for which it is gathered, or for a use consistent with that purpose," they found Gallant's use of the information did not further her private interests as alleged. Because the use of the constituents' information did not meet the definition in Section 3(2) of the Member's Code for furthering private interests, the Office of the Ethics Commissioner discontinued their inquiry.

Of around 60 major candidates in 15 Eastern Ontario and Western Quebec ridings, Gallant was the only one who didn't attend a meeting with the Ottawa Citizen editorial board. "Ms. Gallant's decision to duck every difficult question from the media is nothing short of childish", commented Citizen columnist Kelly Egan. Gallant has stated that she was focused on campaigning locally in order to keep in touch with the concerns of local constituents.

In February 2011, during Defence Committee hearings in St. John's before an audience which included the family and co-workers of mariners lost at sea in recent accidents on the Atlantic, Gallant remarked, "In Ontario we have inland seas, the Great Lakes, and it would never occur to any of us, even up in the Ottawa River, to count on the Coast Guard to come and help us." Gallant said federal search and ocean rescue should be coordinated with privately operated resources and local governments. Gallant's comparison of recreational boaters in sheltered inland waters to mariners on the Atlantic hundreds of miles from land drew outrage from many who had lost family at sea. She initially refused to apologize saying her remarks were misinterpreted, but on February 10, Gallant said she was sorry and did not mean to minimize ocean dangers.

On March 28, 2011, after stating in a press release that she hoped for a clean election campaign, Gallant compared Liberal leader Michael Ignatieff to Libyan dictator Moammar Gadhafi. Gallant wrote on her Twitter page: "No carbon tax please, Igaffi!" Her initial tweet was deleted, but not before it was screen-captured and distributed to the national press. She tweeted an apology to Ignatieff for her remarks on April 1.

In March 2016, Gallant caused further outrage and controversy by using the death of Corporal Nathan Cirillo as a means to generate money for her campaign through an Easter ham lottery. Cirillo was killed while standing guard at the National War Memorial on October 22, 2014.

In May 2016, Gallant accused the Rideau Institute of having ties to North Korea, Iran, and Russia on account of the Institute having those countries as options on their donation page when stating their nation of origin.

In June 2017, Gallant was the only Member of Parliament to vote against a government motion re-affirming support for the Paris Agreement.

In February 2021, Gallant was recorded on a Zoom meeting with a university student group, accusing Liberals of wanting to "normalize sexual activity with children".

During the Freedom Convoy protests, Gallant commented on her Facebook page to "Watch for Trudeau's gang to pull off false flag operations." She advertised a Pembroke protest on her Facebook page, and has encouraged protests nationwide.

== Electoral record ==
2025 Canadian federal election: Algonquin—Renfrew—Pembroke
Party	Candidate	Votes	%	±%
Conservative	Cheryl Gallant	37,333	55.71	+6.20
Liberal	Cyndi Mills	25,338	37.81	+18.44
New Democratic	Eileen Jones-Whyte	2,469	3.68	−17.28
United	Randy Briand	909	1.36	N/A
Green	Danilo Velasquez	618	0.92	−0.98
Independent	Seth Malina	229	0.34	
Independent	Stefan Klietsch	122	0.18	-0.46
Total valid votes		67,018	99.44	
Total rejected ballots		375	0.56	-0.22
Turnout		67,393	72.36	+5.82
Eligible voters		93,133		
Conservative hold		Swing		−6.12
Source: Elections Canada

2021 Canadian federal election
Party	Candidate	Votes	%	±%
Conservative	Cheryl Gallant	28,967	49.5	-3.22
New Democratic	Jodie Primeau	12,263	21.0	+6.10
Liberal	Cyndi Mills	11,335	19.4	-0.16
People's	David Ainsworth	4,469	7.6	+5.12
Green	Michael Lariviere	1,111	1.9	-3.58
Independent	Stefan Klietsch	373	0.6	
Total valid votes		58,518		
Total rejected ballots		459		
Turnout				
Eligible voters				
Source: Elections Canada

2019 Canadian federal election: Renfrew—Nipissing—Pembroke
Party	Candidate	Votes	%	±%	Expenditures
Conservative	Cheryl Gallant	31,080	52.72	+6.89	$66,041.60
Liberal	Ruben Marini	11,532	19.56	-13.10	$45,587.70
New Democratic	Eileen Jones-Whyte	8,786	14.90	+6.34	$16,662.56
Green	Ian Pineau	3,230	5.48	+3.55	$3,432.43
People's	David Ainsworth	1,463	2.48		none listed
Independent	Dan Criger	1,125	1.91		$9,173.74
Independent	Dheerendra Kumar	917	1.56		none listed
Veterans Coalition	Robert Cherrin	358	0.61		none listed
Libertarian	Stefan Klietsch	266	0.45		none listed
Independent	Jonathan Davis	200	0.34		none listed
Total valid votes/expense limit		58,957	99.21		
Total rejected ballots		471	0.79	+0.33	
Turnout		59,428	68.79	-3.93	
Eligible voters		86,387			
Conservative hold		Swing		+9.99	
Source: Elections Canada

2015 Canadian federal election: Renfrew—Nipissing—Pembroke (federal electoral district)
Party	Candidate	Votes	%	±%	Expenditures
Conservative	Cheryl Gallant	26,195	45.8	-7.63	–
Liberal	Jeff Lehoux	18,666	32.7	+19.97	–
Independent	Hec Clouthier	6,300	11.0	-7.7	–
New Democratic	Dan McCarthy	4,893	8.6	-4.83	–
Green	Stefan Klietsch	1,105	1.9	+0.19	–
Total valid votes/Expense limit		57,159	100.0	–	$222,926.86
Total rejected ballots		264	–	–	
Turnout		57,423	73.5	+6.61	
Eligible voters		78,080			
Conservative hold		Swing		-13.8	
Source: Elections Canada

2011 Canadian federal election: Renfrew—Nipissing—Pembroke (federal electoral district)
Party	Candidate	Votes	%	±%	Expenditures
Conservative	Cheryl Gallant	27,462	53.43	-7.66	–
Independent	Hec Clouthier	9,611	18.70	–	–
New Democratic	Eric Burton	6,903	13.43	+2.50	–
Liberal	Christine Tabbert	6,545	12.73	-7.84	–
Green	Rosanne Van Schie	877	1.71	-5.05	–
Total valid votes/Expense limit		51,398	100.00		–
Total rejected ballots		166	0.32	-0.08	
Turnout		51,564	66.89	+3.74	
Eligible voters		77,082	–	–	
Conservative hold		Swing		+0.18	

2008 Canadian federal election: Renfrew—Nipissing—Pembroke
Party	Candidate	Votes	%	±%	Expenditures
Conservative	Cheryl Gallant	28,908	61.10	+3.4	$55,331
Liberal	Carole Devine	9,737	20.58	-3.52	$68,316
New Democratic	Sue McSheffrey	5,175	10.94	-1.56	$25,911
Green	Ben Hoffman	3,201	6.77	+3.67	$7,564
Independent	Denis Gagné	293	0.62		$0
Total valid votes		47,314	100.00		
Total rejected ballots		188			
Turnout		47,502	63.15		
Electors on the lists		75,223			
Conservative hold		Swing		+3.46	
Sources: Official Results, Elections Canada and Financial Returns, Elections Canada.

2006 Canadian federal election: Renfrew—Nipissing—Pembroke (federal electoral district)
Party	Candidate	Votes	%	±%
Conservative	Cheryl Gallant	29,992	57.7	+2.6
Liberal	Don Lindsay	12,551	24.1	-5.5
New Democratic	Sue McSheffrey	6,505	12.5	+1.0
Green	Gordon S. McLeod	1,601	3.1	+0.7
Independent	Paul Kelly	1,338	2.6	*
Total valid votes		51,987	100.0	
Conservative hold		Swing		+9.0

2004 Canadian federal election: Renfrew—Nipissing—Pembroke (federal electoral district)
Party	Candidate	Votes	%	±%
Conservative	Cheryl Gallant	27,494	55.1	-0.4
Liberal	Rob Jamieson	14,798	29.6	-9.4
New Democratic	Sue McSheffrey	5,720	11.5	+8.0
Green	Gordon S. McLeod	1,191	2.4	
Marijuana	Stanley Sambey	714	1.4	-0.2
Total valid votes		49,917	100.0	
Conservative hold		Swing		+4.05

2000 Canadian federal election: Renfrew—Nipissing—Pembroke (federal electoral district)
Party	Candidate	Votes	%	±%
Alliance	Cheryl Gallant	20,634	44.2	+17.4
Liberal	Hec Clouthier	18,211	39.0	-1.3
Progressive Conservative	Bob Amaron	5,287	11.3	-14.1
New Democratic	Ole Hendrickson	1,607	3.4	-3.2
Marijuana	Stanley E. Sambey	762	1.6	
Independent	Thane C. Heins	121	0.3	*
Natural Law	André Giordano	78	0.2	-0.2
Alliance gain from Liberal		Swing		+9.2
Total valid votes		46,700	100.0	
