= Matthew McKay (politician) =

Canadian politician (1858–1937)

Member of Parliament for Renfrew North
- In office December 1921 – October 1925
- Preceded by: Herbert John Mackie
- Succeeded by: Ira Delbert Cotnam

Member of Parliament for Renfrew North
- In office October 1935 – February 1937
- Preceded by: Ira Delbert Cotnam
- Succeeded by: Ralph Warren

Personal details
- Born: 6 October 1858 West Gwillimbury Township, Canada West
- Died: 14 February 1937 (aged 78) Ottawa, Ontario, Canada
- Party: Liberal
- Spouse(s): Dennison m. 10 May 1888
- Profession: dentist/dental surgeon, teacher

Matthew McKay (6 October 1858 – 14 February 1937) was a Liberal party member of the House of Commons of Canada. He was born in West Gwillimbury Township, Ontario and became a dentist, dental surgeon and schoolteacher.

McKay attended high school at Bradford, Whitby Collegiate Institute, Normal School in Toronto and Queen's University in Kingston (Bachelor of Arts) and the Royal College of Dental Surgeons in Toronto.

McKay was a councillor of Pembroke, Ontario for five years and once served as the community's mayor.

He was first elected to Parliament at the Renfrew North riding in the 1921 general election. After serving one term, he was defeated by Ira Delbert Cotnam of the Conservative party in the 1925 election. After unsuccessful attempts to unseat Cotnam in 1926 and 1930, McKay returned to the House of Commons by defeating Cotnam in the 1935 election. McKay died at an Ottawa hospital on 14 February 1937 from influenza and pneumonia before completing his term in the 18th Canadian Parliament. He was survived by a wife, two daughters and a son.
