= James Forgie =

Canadian politician

James Moffat Forgie

Member of Parliament for Renfrew North
- In office August 1953 – September 1965
- Preceded by: Ralph Warren
- Succeeded by: Len Hopkins

Personal details
- Born: 31 October 1889 Pembroke, Ontario, Canada
- Died: 3 May 1969 (aged 79)
- Party: Liberal
- Spouse(s): Constance Elizabeth Coulthard (m. 20 August 1916)
- Profession: Barrister, lawyer

James Moffat Forgie (31 October 1889 – 3 May 1969) was a Liberal party member of the House of Commons of Canada.

Forgie was born in Pembroke, Ontario and became a barrister and lawyer. He attended schools at St. Andrews College then Queen's University where he received his Bachelor of Arts in 1911, then attended Osgoode Hall Law School. He also served in World War I as a captain with the 48th Highlanders, then in World War II as a major with the Canadian Armoured Corps.

He made an unsuccessful attempt to win a seat in the Ontario Legislature in 1948.
