= Hec Clouthier =

Canadian politician

Hector Clouthier
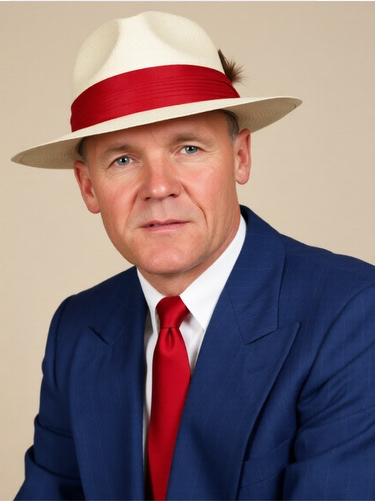

Member of Parliament for Renfrew—Nipissing—Pembroke
- In office 2 June 1997 – 27 November 2000
- Preceded by: Len Hopkins
- Succeeded by: Cheryl Gallant

Parliamentary Secretary to the Minister of National Defence
- In office 1 September 2000 – 21 December 2000
- Leader: Jean Chrétien
- Preceded by: Robert Bertrand
- Succeeded by: John O'Reilly

Personal details
- Born: 18 October 1949 (age 76) Pembroke, Ontario
- Party: Liberal
- Other political affiliations: Independent 1993–1997, 2011–2015
- Education: Loyola College
- Profession: Businessman

Hector Daniel Clouthier (born 18 October 1949) is a former Federal Member of Parliament for the riding of Renfrew—Nipissing—Pembroke in Ontario, Canada. He is known for wearing a fedora and his election slogan, "Give 'em Hec".

== Early life ==
Prior to being elected, Clouthier was Vice-President of Hec Clouthier and Sons Inc., a well-known lumbering firm in the Upper Ottawa Valley. Clouthier served as a community volunteer, as Campaign Chair for the United Way Upper Ottawa Valley, Chair of the Ottawa Valley Lumber Association, President of the Pembroke and Area Chamber of Commerce, Chair of Quality Assurance, Risk Management, and French language services for the Pembroke Regional Hospital, and as Chair of Personnel for St. Joseph's Non Profit Housing.

Taught by Jesuits at Loyola College in Montreal, Clouthier also holds certificates in Strategic Human Resource Management (SHRM) from Harvard University Graduate School of Business Administration and in Alternative Dispute Resolution from the University of Windsor.

== Federal politics ==
He sought the Liberal nomination in Renfrew—Nipissing—Pembroke in 1988, challenging the Liberal incumbent Len Hopkins. More than 3,500 people voted in the nomination election, with Hopkins winning by a narrow margin. Clouthier announced he would once again seek the nomination in 1993, but his candidacy was denied by then-party leader Jean Chrétien who protected Hopkins, who had held the seat for twenty-five years. Clouthier ran as an independent candidate in the 1993 federal election, getting over 10,000 votes and finishing second to Hopkins.

In 1997, Hopkins announced he would not be a candidate in the next federal election. There was a spirited battle for the Liberal nomination and over 4,000 memberships were sold. At the party's local convention, Clouthier defeated three other candidates to win the nomination. He subsequently won the general election and became MP for Renfrew—Nipissing—Pembroke. He was elected by his fellow Liberal MPs as Chair of the Eastern Ontario caucus, and was named by the Prime Minister as Parliamentary Secretary to the Minister of National Defence in 2000.

In the 2000 election he was defeated by Canadian Alliance candidate Cheryl Gallant, largely due to his controversial endorsement of gun control, which had become highly unpopular in the region. After the election, he was asked by Prime Minister Jean Chrétien to be a Special Advisor in the Prime Minister's Office. He served in the PMO until Paul Martin took over as prime minister.

Following a long absence from federal politics, Clouthier ran as an independent candidate in the 2011 federal election in his former riding of Renfrew-Nipissing-Pembroke. Clouthier placed a distant second to incumbent Gallant, receiving 18.70% of the vote to Gallant's 53.43. His tally of almost 10,000 votes was the most earned by any independent candidate in Ontario.

In the 2015 federal election, Clouthier again stood as an independent. Following a nationwide surge for the Liberals, Clouthier's vote total fell, and he finished third behind Gallant and the Liberal candidate but, once again, received the most votes of any independent in Ontario.

== Personal life ==
Clouthier has five sisters and four brothers. He married his spouse, Debbie, in 1975 and they have three sons and three grandsons.

In fall 2002, Clouthier met U.S. President George W. Bush in Detroit at a border conference. The American President was "smitten" by Clouthier's fedora and asked for one. Clouthier had a fedora made for the president and sent it to the White House.

Following his time in office, Clouthier served as Executive Director of the Ontario Horse Racing Industry Association (OHRIA) from 2007 to 2010. Horse racing in Ontario is a multibillion-dollar industry. An avid horse racer, Clouthier holds a professional harness horse driver's licence. Clouthier resigned as the Executive Director of OHRIA prior to contesting the 2011 federal election.

Clouthier has a passion for long-distance running, having completed 50 marathons, including 8 runs of the Boston Marathon. In 2024 he ran the New York Marathon at age 75 . It was his 50th full marathon. In 2026 he ran the Ottawa Half Marathon. It was Clouthier's 40th half marathon.

In 2017, Clouthier released a book he wrote about his life titled "Give 'Em Hec!" and, in 2019, he wrote a book about the life of his father, Hector Clouthier Sr., called "Mr. Lumberjack".

In 2026 Hector Clouthier was inducted into his hometown of Petawawa's Sports and Entertainment Hall of Fame in two categories, marathon running and horse racing.

Marianhill, a senior citizen's complex in Pembroke, Ontario, asked Clouthier to be their campaign chair for a $59 million redevelopment project called "Building Care". He accepted and is currently raising funds for the expansion.

== Membership in Algonquin Nation ==
Clouthier is a member of the Bonnechere Algonquin Community and is of Algonquin descent recognized within the meaning of Section 35 of the Canadian Constitution Act (1982).
