= Thomas Dix Hincks =

Irish orientalist and naturalist

Thomas Dix Hincks ((24 June 1767 in Dublin, Ireland – 1857 in Belfast, Ireland) was an Irish orientalist and naturalist. He was a founding member of the Belfast Natural History Society and a member of the Royal Irish Academy.

== Early life and education ==
Hincks was born in Dublin to customs officer Edward Hincks and his wife, who came from the Dix family.

Hincks was apprenticed to an apothecary, but entered Trinity College, Dublin in 1782 to train as a minister; he left his course and studied at the New College in London (a dissenting academy) to complete his training.

== Career ==
Hincks was ordained a Presbyterian minister in 1792 and worked at the Old Presbyterian Church (Unitarian) on Princes Street in Cork.

After teaching in the Cork Institution, which he founded, he taught in Fermoy, County Cork. In 1821 he was appointed Master of the Classical School at the Belfast Academical Institution; he became Professor of Oriental Languages the following year, and taught at the school for over 25 years. He gained a Doctorate in Laws from Glasgow University in 1834.

He was a founding member of the Belfast Natural History and Philosophical Society, and produced several speeches and pamphlets regarding nature.

He retired to Belfast and died there; he and his wife are buried in the Anglican parish graveyard at Killyleagh, County Down.

The Unitarian Church in Prince’s Street, Cork, has a plaque in his honour.

== Publications ==
He wrote A Greek-English Lexicon. Containing all the words that occur in the books used in most schools and collegiate courses, as well as a Geography textbook. He also edited the Munster Agricultural Magazine in Cork. For Rees's Cyclopædia he contributed the article on Ireland (Vol 19), 1811 and other Irish topics.

== Personal life ==
On 6 September 1791, Thomas married Anne Boult (d. 1835).

They had seven children, and four of them became ministers.

Three of the Hincks’ children had distinguished careers;

- (1) Edward Hincks, Orientalist and minister in the Church of Ireland
- (2) William Hincks, Unitarian minister and Professor of Natural History
- (3) Sir Francis Hincks, Canadian politician and Governor of Barbados.

His grandson Thomas David Hincks (b. 1818) was a preacher and naturalist in Cork and Leeds.

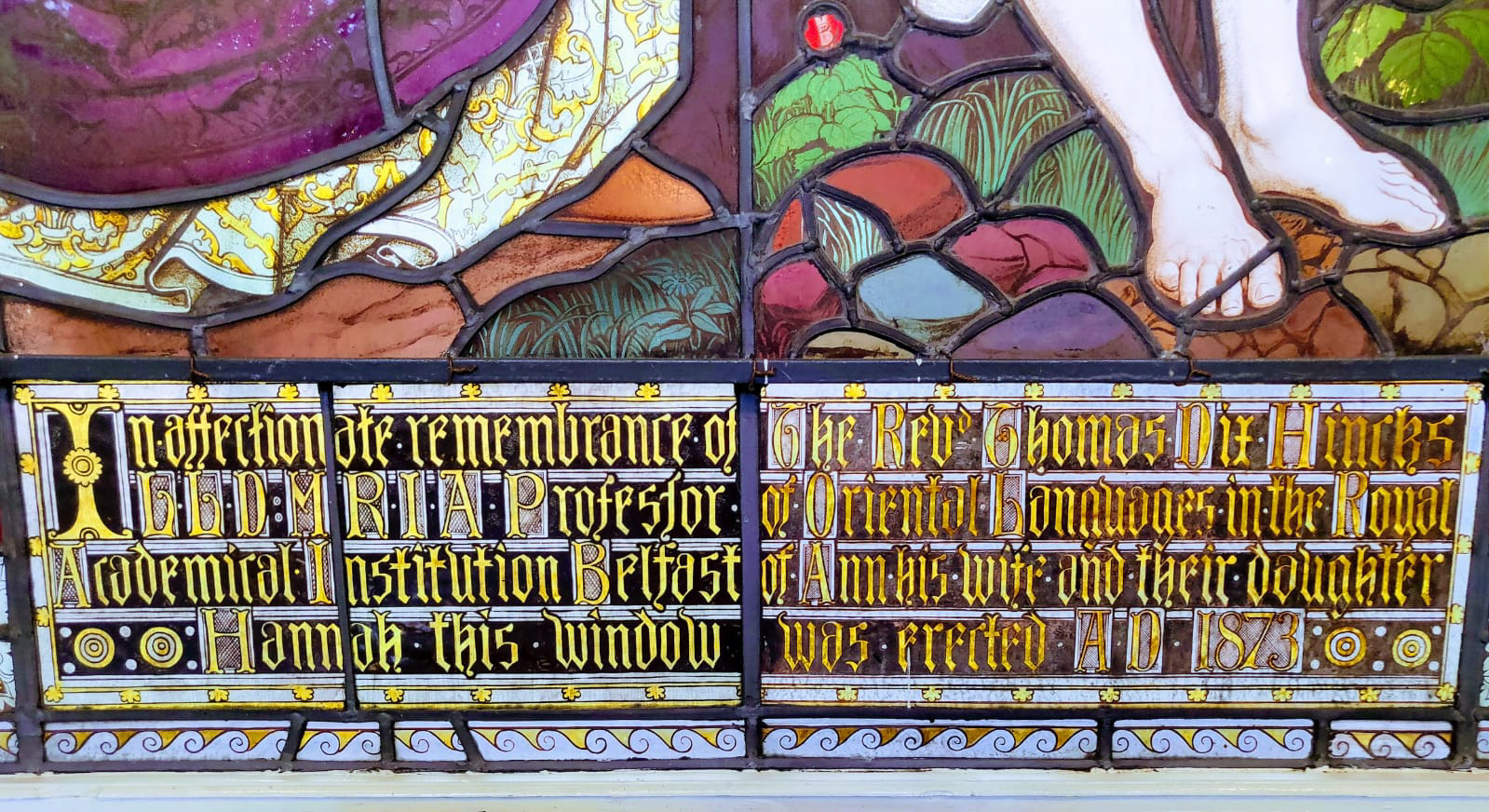
Dedication to Hincks on stained glass window from wife Ann, & daughter Hannah, at First Presbyterian Church, Rosemary St., Belfast, N. Ireland

== Additional sources ==
- Nash, R. and Ross, H.C.G. The development of natural history in early 19th century Ireland in From Linnaeus to Darwin: commentaries on the history of biology and geology Society for the bibliography of Natural History 13:27-
- Foster, John Wilson; Helena C. G. Chesney, eds. (1997). Nature in Ireland: A Scientific and Cultural History. Dublin: Lilliput Press. ISBN 1-874675-29-5.
