= Rosslyn Hill Unitarian Chapel =

Place of worship in Hampstead, London

Coordinates: 51.5554°N 0.1730°W

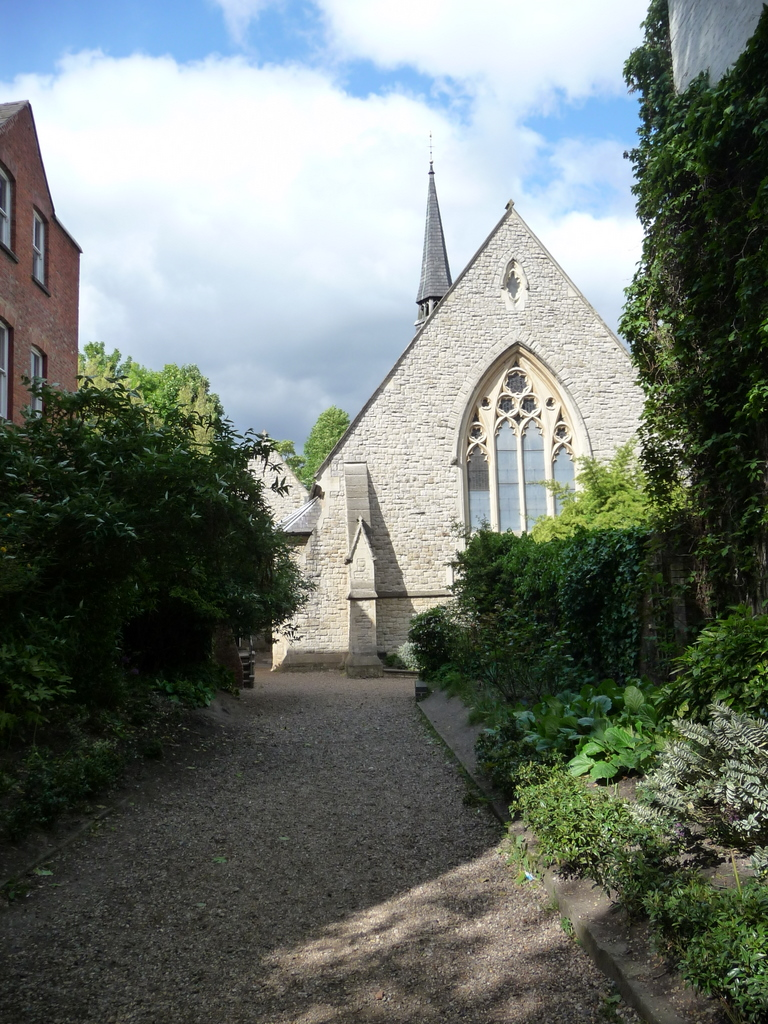
Rosslyn Hill Chapel in 2009

The Rosslyn Hill Unitarian Chapel is a place of worship in Hampstead, London. It is a member of the General Assembly of Unitarian and Free Christian Churches, the umbrella organisation for British Unitarians. It is also a Grade II Listed building.

== Building ==
The chapel, which stands on Rosslyn Hill, was at first a simple wooden structure. Said to have been built in 1692 by Isaac Honeywood who lived in the adjoining mansion, the Red Lion Hill meeting house was first replaced in 1736 and then, having become unsafe, rebuilt in brick on roughly the same site in 1828. The current building (using the old brick chapel as its hall) was built from 1862 to 1885 in the Neo Gothic style. Two of the building's stained-glass windows are by Edward Burne-Jones and William Morris and another is by Henry Holiday. It holds four John Flaxman reliefs and plaques to previous congregants, such as Helen Allingham (the first woman artist admitted to the Royal Academy). Its stone arches and pointed ceiling vault give it an excellent acoustic, making it a popular recording venue.

== Ministers ==
The minister is Kate Dean. Ministers who have served the Chapel include Stephen Lobb (1647?–1699), Richard Amner (1736–1803), Rochemont Barbauld, husband of the radical poet Anna Laetitia Barbauld (1743–1825), Jeremiah Joyce (1763–1816) and William Hincks (1794–1871). It was during the 45-year-long ministry of Thomas Sadler (1822–1891), who arrived at the Chapel in 1846 aged 24, just two years after being awarded his doctorate from the University of Erlangen-Nuremberg in Bavaria, that the current Chapel building was constructed.

== Congregation ==
Among the prominent residents of Hampstead who occasionally attended the Chapel in the years immediately after it was built in 1862 was the novelist George Eliot. Politicians who were worshippers included John Wood (1789–1856), a trustee of the chapel, who was a Whig MP for Preston (1826–32) and a strong supporter of the Great Reform Act 1832, and William Lawrence (1818-1897), Lord Mayor of London (1863/4) and twice Liberal MP for the City of London (1865–74, 1880–85).
