= Francis Hincks =

Canadian politician and British colonial governor (1807-1885)

The Honourable Sir Francis Hincks PC KCMG CB
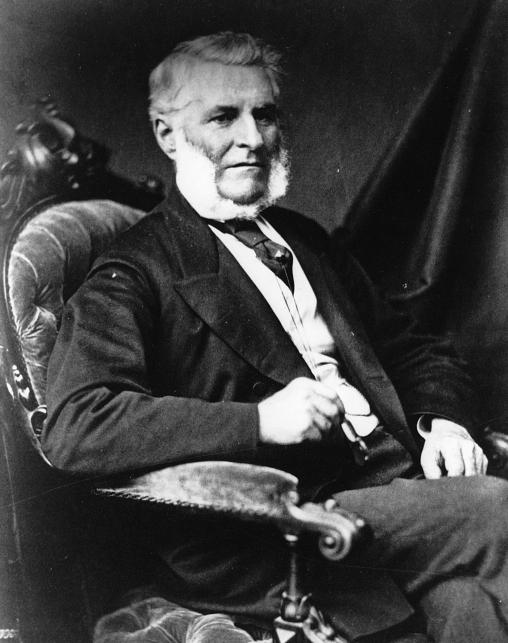
- The Hon. Francis Hincks

Co-Premier of Province of Canada, for Canada West
- In office 1851–1854 Serving with Augustin-Norbert Morin, Co-Premier for Canada East
- Monarch: Victoria
- Governor General: Earl of Elgin
- Preceded by: Robert Baldwin
- Succeeded by: Sir Allan MacNab
- Constituency: Oxford, Canada West

Governor of Barbados and the British Windward Islands
- In office 1856 – January 4, 1862
- Preceded by: Sir William MacBean George Colebrooke
- Succeeded by: Sir James Walker

Governor of British Guiana
- In office January 7, 1862 – January 25, 1869
- Preceded by: Sir Philip Wodehouse
- Succeeded by: Sir John Scott

Minister of Finance
- In office October 9, 1869 – February 21, 1873
- Governors General: Lord Lisgar; Earl Dufferin
- Prime Minister: Sir John A. Macdonald
- Preceded by: Sir John Rose
- Succeeded by: Samuel Leonard Tilley
- Parliamentary group: Liberal-Conservative
- Constituency: Renfrew North (1869–1872); Vancouver (1873–1874)

Member of the Legislative Assembly of the Province of Canada
- In office 1841–1844
- Preceded by: New position
- Succeeded by: Robert Riddell
- Parliamentary group: Reformer (pre-Confederation)
- Constituency: Oxford, Canada West; Renfrew

Member of the Legislative Assembly of the Province of Canada
- In office 1848–1854
- Preceded by: Robert Riddell
- Succeeded by: Ephraim Cook
- Parliamentary group: Reformer (pre-Confederation)
- Constituency: Oxford, Canada West

Member of the Legislative Assembly of the Province of Canada
- In office 1854–1855
- Preceded by: New district
- Succeeded by: John Supple
- Parliamentary group: Reformer (pre-Confederation)
- Constituency: Renfrew County, Canada West

Member of the House of Commons of Canada
- In office 1869–1872
- Preceded by: John Rankin
- Succeeded by: James Findlay
- Parliamentary group: Liberal-Conservative
- Constituency: Renfrew North, Ontario

Member of the House of Commons of Canada
- In office 1873–1874
- Preceded by: New district
- Succeeded by: Arthur Bunster
- Parliamentary group: Liberal-Conservative
- Constituency: Vancouver, British Columbia

Personal details
- Born: December 14, 1807 Cork, Ireland
- Died: August 18, 1885 (aged 77) Montreal, Quebec, Canada
- Cause of death: Smallpox
- Citizenship: British subject
- Party: Reformer (pre-Confederation)
- Other political affiliations: Liberal-Conservative (post-Confederation)
- Spouse(s): (1) Martha Anne Stewart (1832 – 1874 (her death)) (2) Emily Louisa Delatre (1875 – 1880 (her death))
- Parent: Rev. Thomas Dix Hincks (father)
- Relatives: Edward Hincks and William Hincks (brothers)
- Education: Trinity College, Dublin
- Occupation: Import business, banking, journalism
- Awards: Knighted, 1869

Sir Francis Hincks, PC, KCMG, CB (December 14, 1807 – August 18, 1885) was a Canadian businessman, politician, and British colonial administrator. An immigrant from Ireland, he was the Co-Premier of the Province of Canada (1851–1854), Governor of Barbados (1856–1862), Governor of British Guiana (1862–1869) and Canadian Minister of Finance (1869–1873).

== Early life ==
Born at Cork in Ireland, he was the ninth and youngest child of the Rev. Thomas Dix Hincks, a Presbyterian minister and scholar, and his wife Anne (née Boult). Two of his older brothers, Edward Hincks and William Hincks, followed their father's footsteps as noted scholars and clergy. Francis was also intended for a career as a clergyman and was educated at the Royal Belfast Academical Institution. However, he found himself more interested in business, starting in Belfast, with commercial ties to the West Indies. It was at Belfast that he married his first wife. Two weeks after their marriage, they set sail for the Canadas.

== Business career ==
Arriving in York, Upper Canada (now Toronto), Hincks set up a wholesale import business. He rented business premises from William Warren Baldwin and his son, Robert Baldwin. The Baldwins were a leading Reform family, opposed to the Tory Family Compact, which had run the government of the Province for many years. Hincks became friends with the Baldwins, who were also of Irish descent. He attended a 1839 meeting where W.W. Baldwin and other reformers tried to discuss political matters and were dispersed by Tories. Hincks later claimed he barely escaped with his life.

He accepted a job as manager for the Farmer's Joint Stock Bank but left to become manager of the newly formed Bank of the People after the management of the Farmers' Bank became dominated by Tories. When even moderate reformers were being persecuted following the Upper Canada Rebellion of 1837, Hincks considered moving to the United States. However, the appointment of Lord Durham in 1838 provided new hope and he chose to continue in Upper Canada. That year, he established The Examiner in Toronto, with the aim of promoting responsible government; this newspaper merged with The Globe, the predecessor of The Globe and Mail, in 1855.

After resigning from cabinet and government affairs in 1873, he became President of the Montreal-based City Bank of Montreal. This bank merged with the Royal Canadian Bank to form the Consolidated Bank of Canada, and Hincks was its first President. His signature appears on banknotes issued by these institutions.

== Political career ==
=== Reform Party and responsible government ===
Hincks was elected to the Legislative Assembly of the 1st Parliament of the Province of Canada, sitting from 1841 to 1844, representing Oxford County. He was defeated in 1844, but elected in 1848 and subsequent elections, sitting from 1848 to 1855.

==== Bank notes and central bank ====
During his first term, Hincks was the chair of a select committee which studied a proposal from the Governor General, Lord Sydenham, who advocated that the government should take over the issuing of bank notes. Up to that time, paper notes were issued by the banks. Sydenham proposed that the government take over that function, with control over the amount of paper money in circulation, a forerunner of the idea of a central bank. Issuing the notes would also give the government an important source of income.

Although Hincks personally supported the proposal, it was defeated in the committee, largely because of opposition from the banks who would lose a major source of income.

==== Inspector general ====
In 1842, he was appointed inspector general of public accounts. In 1844, he became editor of a new newspaper in Montreal, the Pilot, which supported Reformers in both Canada East and Canada West. Because he sought subscriptions for his paper in Canada West, he came into conflict with George Brown, editor of the Globe. In 1848, he sold the paper and accepted the post of inspector general.

=== Co-Premier of Province of Canada ===
Hincks was Premier of the Province of Canada from 1851 to 1854. Hincks' vision of a railroad linking British North America led to the establishment of the Grand Trunk Railway in 1852 and he helped negotiate the Reciprocity Treaty of 1854 with the United States.

==== Decimal currency ====
During Hincks' time in office, currency reforms were a major issue in the British North American provinces. Although the British government wanted to keep all of its overseas possessions on the pound sterling, the North American provinces favoured a decimal currency, to facilitate trade with the United States. A compromise was reached in 1853 when the Canadian Parliament passed a Currency Act, allowing both pounds and American dollars to be used in the Province of Canada, at fixed exchange rates. New Brunswick passed similar legislation, the beginning of a common currency system in British North America.

==== Fall of government ====
A scandal developed in 1854 as a result of profits made by Hincks and Mayor John George Bowes of Toronto from the sale of railway stock. The government fell as a result, but when this matter was reviewed in the next parliament, no basis was found for allegations of corruption against Hincks.

=== Governorships in the Caribbean ===
In 1856, he accepted an appointment as governor of Barbados and the Windward Islands, and, in 1861, became governor of British Guiana. He was knighted in 1869, upon the completion of his term in British Guiana.

=== Minister of Finance ===
On his return to Canada, he was elected to the House of Commons of Canada and became Minister of Finance from 1869 until 1874. Starting in 1870, he created the first government-issued fractional paper currency, popularly known as "Shinplasters". This was intended to deal with the large amount of American silver coins entering the country, which were valued less than a Canadian dollar. While intended as a temporary solution, the shinplasters were popular, with subsequent issues in 1900 and 1923.

== Later life ==
In 1878, he represented the federal government on the Ontario-Manitoba boundary commission.

He was also an editor of the Toronto Express newspaper.

== Family ==
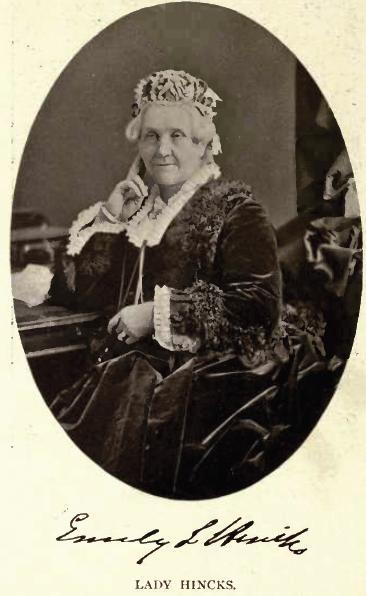
Emily Louisa Hincks by William Notman

Hincks was married twice. In 1832, he married Martha Anne Stewart, in Belfast, Ireland. They remained married until her death in 1874 and had five children.

In 1875, he married Emily Louisa Delatre, widow of Judge Robert Baldwin Sullivan, another member of the extended Baldwin family. Lady Hincks died in Montreal, May 14, 1880, aged 69.

Sir Francis Hincks died in Montreal, August 18, 1885, of smallpox.

== Legacy ==
Hincks Township in Quebec, also called Hincksville, was named in his honour (but was officially renamed in 1975 to Lac-Sainte-Marie).

Hincks Street, Bridgetown, Barbados: In February 1861 H.R.H. Prince Alfred, the Duke of Edinburgh visited Barbados. In a bout of excess jubilation towards the visit, authorities promptly renamed several streets in and around the capital city of Bridgetown. Among the changes, one of the city's oldest streets, Madeira Street was renamed to Hincks Street after Sir Francis, the then Governor of Barbados.

Political offices
Preceded by Robert Baldwin	Joint Premiers of the Province of Canada – Canada West; 1851–1854	Succeeded by Sir Allan Napier MacNab
Preceded by Sir John Rose	Minister of Finance; 22 February 1873 – 5 November 1873	Succeeded by Samuel Tilley
Government offices
Preceded by William MacBean George Colebrooke	Governor of Barbados and the Windward Islands; 1856–1862	Succeeded by James Walker
Preceded by Sir Philip Wodehouse	Governor of British Guiana; 1862–1869	Succeeded by Sir John Scott
Parliament of Canada
Preceded by John Rankin, Cons.	Member of Parliament from Renfrew North; 1869–1872	Succeeded by James Findlay, Liberal
New riding	Member of Parliament from Vancouver; 1872–1874	Succeeded by Arthur Bunster, Liberal
