= Renfrew North (federal electoral district) =

Former federal electoral district in Ontario, Canada

Ontario electoral district

Defunct federal electoral district
- Legislature: House of Commons
- District created: 1867
- District abolished: 1976
- First contested: 1867
- Last contested: 1974

Renfrew North (also known as Renfrew North—Nipissing East) was a federal electoral district represented in the House of Commons of Canada from 1867 to 1979. It was located in the province of Ontario. It was created by the British North America Act 1867. The riding existed until 1972, when the name was changed to "Renfrew North—Nipissing East".

The North Riding of Renfrew initially consisted of the Townships of Ross, Bromley, Westmeath, Stafford, Pembroke, Wilberforce, Alice, Petawawa, Buchanan, South Algona, North Algona, Fraser, McKay, Wylie, Rolph, Head, Maria, Clara, Haggerty, Sherwood, Burns, Richards, and any other surveyed Townships lying northwesterly of the said North Riding.

In 1892, "North Renfrew" was redefined to consist of the town of Pembroke, that part of the village of Eganville north of the River Bonnechère, and the townships of Ross, Bromley, Westmeath, Stafford, Pembroke, Wilberforce, Alice, Petawawa, Buchanan, South Algona, North Algona, Fraser, McKay, Wylie and Rolph.

In 1903, it was redefined to consist of the townships of Algona North, Algona South, Alice, Bromley, Buchanan, Fraser, McKay, Pembroke, Petawawa, Rolph, Ross, Stafford, Westmeath, Wilberforce and Wylie, the town of Pembroke, the village of Cobden, and the part of the village of Eganville lying within the township of Wilberforce.

In 1924, "Renfrew North" was defined to consist of that part of the county of Renfrew lying north and east and including the townships of Ross, Bromley, Wilberforce, Algona (North and South), and Fraser, and including the part of the territorial district of Nipissing lying east of and including the townships of Cameron, Deacon, Anglin, Dickson, Preston, and Airy.

It was redefined several times following that, but generally included most of Renfrew County and the eastern part of Nipissing.

The electoral district was abolished in 1976 when it was redistributed between Nipissing, Parry Sound-Muskoka and Renfrew—Nipissing—Pembroke ridings.

== Members of Parliament ==
This riding has elected the following members of Parliament:

Parliament	Years	Member	Party
North riding of Renfrew
1st	1867–1869	John Rankin	Conservative
1st	1869–1872	Francis Hincks	Liberal–Conservative
2nd	1872–1874	James Findlay	Liberal
3rd	1874–1874	Peter White	Conservative
3rd	1874–1875	William Murray	Liberal
3rd	1876–1878	Peter White	Conservative
4th	1878–1882	Peter White	Conservative
5th	1882–1887	Peter White	Conservative
6th	1887–1891	Peter White	Conservative
7th	1891–1896	Peter White	Conservative
8th	1896–1900	Thomas Mackie	Liberal
9th	1900–1904	Thomas Mackie	Liberal
10th	1904–1906†	Peter White	Conservative
10th	1906–1908	Gerald Verner White	Conservative
11th	1908–1911	Gerald Verner White	Conservative
12th	1911–1917	Gerald Verner White	Conservative
13th	1917–1921	Herbert John Mackie	Government (Unionist)
14th	1921–1925	Matthew McKay	Liberal
Renfrew North
15th	1925–1926	Ira Delbert Cotnam	Conservative
16th	1926–1930	Ira Delbert Cotnam	Conservative
17th	1930–1935	Ira Delbert Cotnam	Conservative
18th	1935–1937†	Matthew McKay	Liberal
18th	1937–1940	Ralph Warren	Liberal
19th	1940–1945	Ralph Warren	Liberal
20th	1945–1949	Ralph Warren	Liberal
21st	1949–1953	Ralph Warren	Liberal
22nd	1953–1957	James Forgie	Liberal
23rd	1957–1958	James Forgie	Liberal
24th	1958–1962	James Forgie	Liberal
25th	1962–1963	James Forgie	Liberal
26th	1963–1965	James Forgie	Liberal
27th	1965–1968	Len Hopkins	Liberal
28th	1968–1972	Len Hopkins	Liberal
Renfrew North—Nipissing East
29th	1972–1974	Len Hopkins	Liberal
30th	1974–1979	Len Hopkins	Liberal
Riding dissolved into Renfrew—Nipissing—Pembroke, Nipissing and Parry Sound-Muskoka

== Election results ==
1867 Canadian federal election: North riding of Renfrew
Party	Candidate	Votes
Conservative	John Rankin	613
Unknown	Thomas Murray	527

Result by municipality

Municipality	Murray	Rankin	Total vote	Eligible voters
Alice Township	25	42	67	76
Bromley Township	71	24	95	110
Head Township	18	0	18	–
Pembroke Township	31	33	64	87
Ross Township	49	110	159	188
Petawawa Township	9	8	17	20
Stafford Township	26	38	64	72
Westmeath Township	82	154	236	300
Wilberforce Township	85	147	232	290
Algona Township (North and South)	67	0	67	94
Rolph, Buchanan, Wylie and McKay Townships	5	2	7	8
Pembroke (village)	59	55	114	154
Total	527	613	1,140	1,399

By-election: On Mr. Rankin's resignation, 13 November 1869: North riding of Renfrew
Party	Candidate	Votes
Liberal-Conservative	Francis Hincks	560
Liberal	James Findlay	440

1872 Canadian federal election: North riding of Renfrew
Party	Candidate	Votes
Liberal	James Findlay	777
Conservative	Peter White	675

1874 Canadian federal election: North riding of Renfrew
Party	Candidate	Votes
Conservative	Peter White	600
Liberal	Thomas Murray	498
Unknown	W. Moffatt	328

By-election: On Mr. White being unseated on petition, 4 November 1874: North riding of Renfrew
Party	Candidate	Votes
Liberal	William Murray	889
Conservative	Peter White	841

By-election: On Mr. Murray being unseated on petition, 21 January 1876: North riding of Renfrew
Party	Candidate	Votes
Conservative	Peter White	1,192
Liberal	William Murray	982

1878 Canadian federal election: North riding of Renfrew
Party	Candidate	Votes
Conservative	Peter White	1,273
Unknown	James Findlay	920

1882 Canadian federal election: North riding of Renfrew
Party	Candidate	Votes
Conservative	Peter White	1,111
Unknown	Thomas Murray	968

1887 Canadian federal election: North riding of Renfrew
Party	Candidate	Votes
Conservative	Peter White	1,534
Liberal	James Findlay	1,286

1891 Canadian federal election: North riding of Renfrew
Party	Candidate	Votes
Conservative	Peter White	1,497
Liberal	Henry Barr	1,418

1896 Canadian federal election: North riding of Renfrew
Party	Candidate	Votes
Liberal	Thomas Mackie	1,900
Conservative	Peter White	1,837

1900 Canadian federal election: North riding of Renfrew
Party	Candidate	Votes
Liberal	Thomas Mackie	2,299
Conservative	Peter White	2,167

1904 Canadian federal election: North riding of Renfrew
Party	Candidate	Votes
Conservative	Peter White	2,495
Liberal	Thomas Mackie	2,275

By-election: On Mr. White's death, 9 October 1906: North riding of Renfrew
Party	Candidate	Votes
Conservative	Gerald Verner White	2,167
Unknown	Thomas Murray	1,166

1908 Canadian federal election: North riding of Renfrew
Party	Candidate	Votes
Conservative	Gerald Verner White	2,493
Liberal	Henry Barr	1,894

1911 Canadian federal election: North riding of Renfrew
Party	Candidate	Votes
Conservative	Gerald Verner White	2,573
Liberal	James Francis Munro	1,865

1917 Canadian federal election: North riding of Renfrew
Party	Candidate	Votes
Government (Unionist)	Herbert John Mackie	3,397
Opposition (Laurier Liberals)	Norman Reid	2,873

1921 Canadian federal election: North riding of Renfrew
Party	Candidate	Votes
Liberal	Matthew McKay	3,828
Progressive	Arthur Collins	3,371
Conservative	Ira Delbert Cotnam	3,015

1925 Canadian federal election: Renfrew North
Party	Candidate	Votes
Conservative	Ira Delbert Cotnam	5,303
Liberal	Matthew McKay	4,529

1926 Canadian federal election: Renfrew North
Party	Candidate	Votes
Conservative	Ira Delbert Cotnam	4,947
Liberal	Matthew McKay	4,288
Progressive	William Robert Kirk	2,220

1930 Canadian federal election: Renfrew North
Party	Candidate	Votes
Conservative	Ira Delbert Cotnam	6,125
Liberal	Matthew McKay	4,897

1935 Canadian federal election: Renfrew North
Party	Candidate	Votes
Liberal	Matthew McKay	6,052
Conservative	Ira Delbert Cotnam	4,134
Reconstruction	Walter Vernon Kidd	1,949

By-election: On Mr. McKay's death, 5 April 1937: Renfrew North
Party	Candidate	Votes
Liberal	Ralph Warren	5,863
Conservative	Edgar Troy Wood	5,459

1940 Canadian federal election: Renfrew North
Party	Candidate	Votes
Liberal	Ralph Warren	6,199
National Government	Edgar Troy Wood	4,536
Co-operative Commonwealth	Delmar Vondette	709

1945 Canadian federal election: Renfrew North
Party	Candidate	Votes
Liberal	Ralph Warren	6,828
Progressive Conservative	William Francis Johnston	5,882
Co-operative Commonwealth	John Charles Wright	1,555

1949 Canadian federal election: Renfrew North
Party	Candidate	Votes
Liberal	Ralph Warren	8,358
Progressive Conservative	Ira Delbert Cotnam	6,598
Co-operative Commonwealth	John Charles Wright	1,530

1953 Canadian federal election: Renfrew North
Party	Candidate	Votes
Liberal	James Forgie	9,360
Progressive Conservative	Ira Delbert Cotnam	7,268

1957 Canadian federal election: Renfrew North
Party	Candidate	Votes
Liberal	James Forgie	10,227
Progressive Conservative	Wallace James Fraser	9,132

1958 Canadian federal election: Renfrew North
Party	Candidate	Votes
Liberal	James Forgie	10,425
Progressive Conservative	Stanley J. Hunt	10,226

1962 Canadian federal election: Renfrew North
Party	Candidate	Votes
Liberal	James Forgie	11,313
Progressive Conservative	Thomas P. Dodd	9,348
Social Credit	John J. Shannon	1,344
New Democratic	Wilfred L. Charbonneau	902

1963 Canadian federal election: Renfrew North
Party	Candidate	Votes
Liberal	James Forgie	11,580
Progressive Conservative	E. Mac Fraser	9,089
Social Credit	Enos Brubacher	1,712
New Democratic	Wilfred L. Charbonneau	947

1965 Canadian federal election: Renfrew North
Party	Candidate	Votes
Liberal	Len Hopkins	10,882
Progressive Conservative	Donald B. Cruikshank	5,846
Independent	Angus A. Campbell	2,812
New Democratic	Lorne E. Catherwood	2,021

1968 Canadian federal election: Renfrew North
Party	Candidate	Votes
Liberal	Len Hopkins	13,195
Progressive Conservative	Del O'Brien	7,976
New Democratic	Kenneth C. Widenmaier	1,813

1972 Canadian federal election: Renfrew North-Nipissing East
Party	Candidate	Votes
Liberal	Len Hopkins	13,553
Progressive Conservative	George A. Kinney	8,440
New Democratic	Maurice R. Payne	3,177

1974 Canadian federal election: Renfrew North-Nipissing East
Party	Candidate	Votes
Liberal	Len Hopkins	14,613
Progressive Conservative	Del O'Brien	7,561
New Democratic	Robert Bob Cox	4,419

== See also ==
- List of Canadian electoral districts
- Historical federal electoral districts of Canada
