= William Murray (Ontario politician) =

Canadian politician

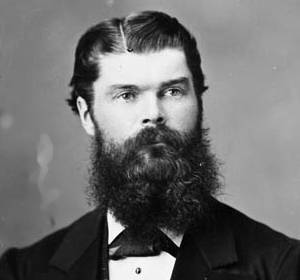
- Source: Library and Archives Canada.

Member of Parliament for Renfrew North
- In office 1874–1875
- Preceded by: Peter White
- Succeeded by: Peter White

Personal details
- Born: June 17, 1839 Goulbourn Township, Upper Canada
- Died: July 15, 1898 (aged 59)
- Party: Liberal

William Murray (June 17, 1839 – July 15, 1898) was a businessman and political figure in Ontario, Canada. He represented Renfrew North in the House of Commons of Canada as a Liberal member from 1874 to 1875.

He was born in Goulbourn Township in 1839, the son of James Murray, an Irish immigrant, and Elizabeth Burrows, and was educated in Goulbourn Township. He entered business with his older brother Thomas in Pembroke. In 1864, he married Margaret Mary Foran. He was declared elected in 1874 after Peter White's election was appealed. In 1876, Murray was unseated and White won the subsequent by-election. In 1884, Thomas and William registered a claim on a nickel deposit near Sudbury which later became the Murray Mine, the first nickel mine established in the area. He died in Pembroke at the age of 59.
