= Silver nuisance =

The silver nuisance was an economic issue in mid-19th century Canada, specifically in Ontario and Quebec. American fractional silver coins were exported to Canada in great quantities, where they were used for day-to-day transactions due to a shortage of small coins. However, their bullion value was lower than their face value in gold, and they were not accepted by banks and some merchants, or only at a discount.

The silver nuisance was solved by the government's exportation of American silver coins from 1868 to ~1870.

== Background ==
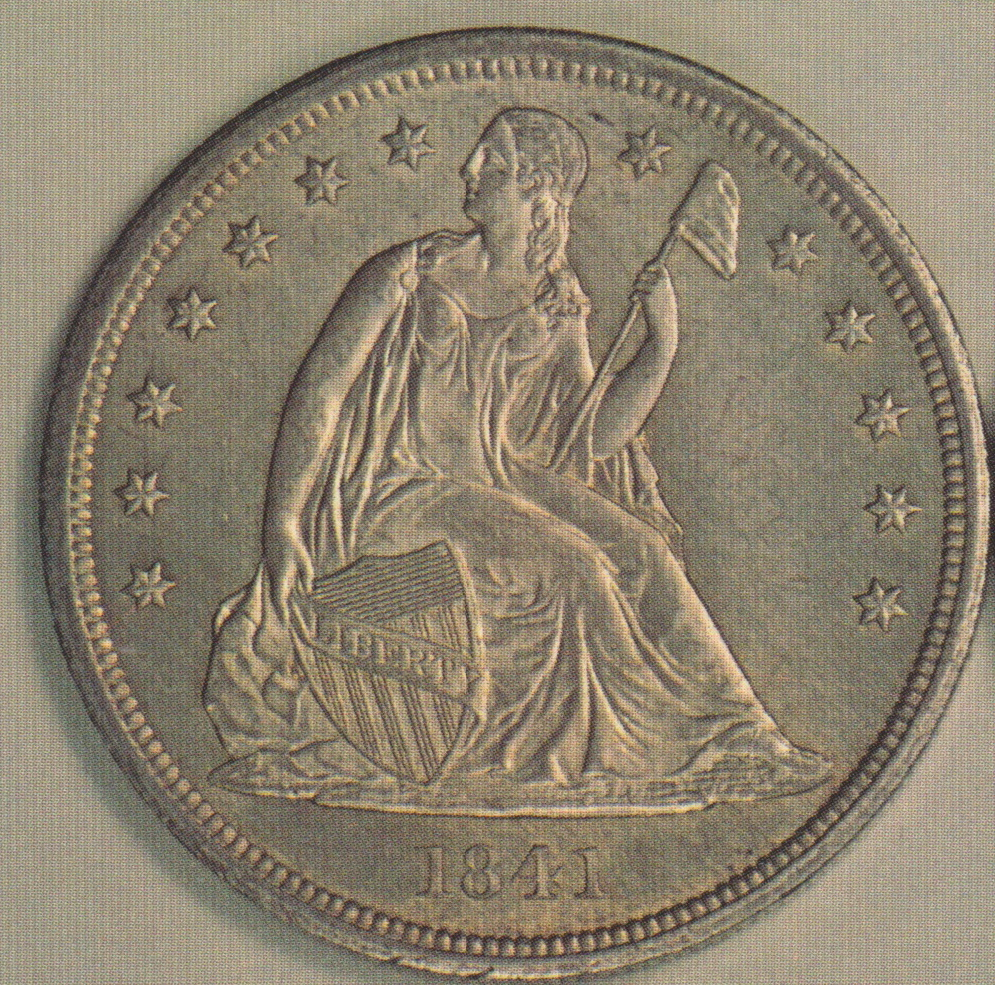
American silver coin from 1841

US silver fractional coins circulated in Canada during the mid-19th century. They started being exported to Canada some years before the American Civil War. The circulation of US coins increased greatly during the American Civil War as silver was used by Union army agents to buy Canadian grain and cattle. A substantial volume of US silver coins was also imported by Canadian brokers, and a common scheme involved exporting American silver coins to Canada and buying gold. Many silver coins were also imported in Canada after specie payments was suspended in 1862 in the US to be replaced by greenbacks.

US coins were initially well-received due to a scarcity of small coins for day-to-day transactions, which generally amounted to less than one dollars. They were preferred to the 1858 Canadian 20-cent coin due to familiarity. They overtook British silver in popularity during the 1860s.

While merchants and individuals accepted American silver coins at par, the silver that made fractional coins was worth ~2,5% less than the coins' face value in gold after the American revaluations of 1853. Banks thus only accepted these coins at a discount in mid-1862, and then refused to accept them at all. (Note: With the silver coins remaining in circulation, instead of an equivalent amount of bank notes.) This was problematic for merchants who continued using American silver coins because of competitive pressure, lack of alternatives and customary acceptance of US coins at par.

Many merchants, especially in Western Canada, eventually also started refusing American fractional coins or only accepting them at a discount to protect themselves. In 1863, the Post Office started to only accept American silver coins at a discount.

This was mainly a problem in Ontario and Quebec, as the Atlantic colonies discounted US coins at 80% of their face value by law.

== Solving the issue ==
After the discount on silver to gold rose in the 1860s, there were requests for government action. In 1868, the government exported $1,000,000 worth of U.S. silver coins to New York. Then in 1869 private interests exported $2,000,000 worth of U.S. silver coins to New York with William Weir as broker, who assumed costs and risks.

Weir and Francis Hincks elaborated a plan in 1870 to solve the silver nuisance. Silver coins were bought by banks recruited by Weir, in large part with their own banknotes. These coins were then exported to New York and London to be sold for gold. In total, over $5,500,000 or over $7,000,000 worth of coins were exported, of which $500,000 were exported by Weir himself. The coins were sold at a discount of 5%-6%, for a net cost of ~$118,000.

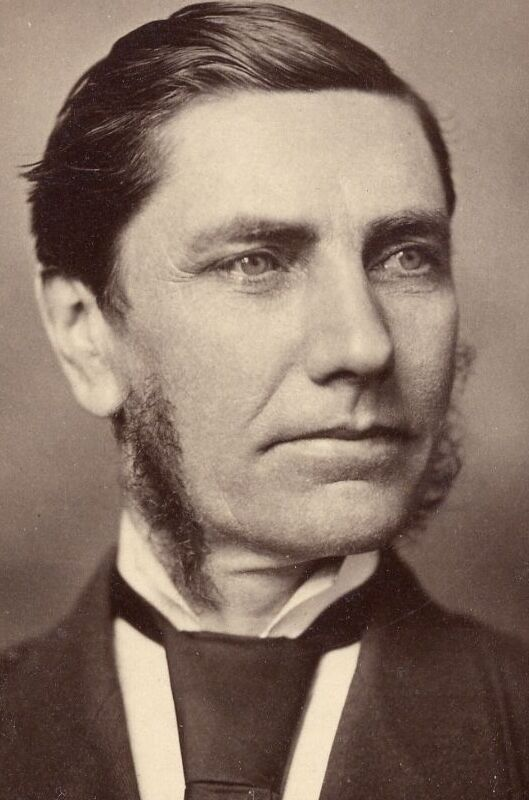
William Weir

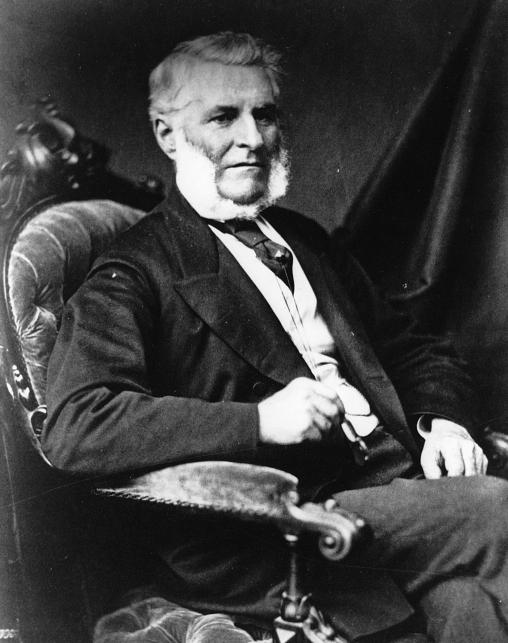
Francis Hincks

The transport costs and market risks were assumed by the government. Banks were given a small commission and a deposit up to $100,000 by the government. The plan was opposed by brokers and businessmen (including the Montreal Board of Trade).

To replace the U.S. coins, the government immediately issued 5, 10, 25 and 50 cents coins, $1 and $2 notes, and 25-cent shinplasters that could be redeemed for gold.
