= Ralph Warren (politician) =

Canadian politician (1882–1954)

Member of Parliament for Renfrew North
- In office 1937–1953
- Preceded by: Matthew McKay
- Succeeded by: James Forgie

Reeve of Wilberforce Township
- In office 1930–1938

Ontario MPP
- In office 1919–1923
- Preceded by: Edward Arunah Dunlop
- Succeeded by: Alexander Stuart
- Constituency: Renfrew North

Personal details
- Born: 4 March 1882; Wilberforce Township, Ontario, Canada
- Died: 6 May 1954 (aged 72); Eganville, Ontario, Canada
- Political party: United Farmers of Ontario (1908–1911); Liberal Party of Canada (1937–1953)
- Spouse(s): Louise Naismith (m. 9 December 1904); Eva Marion Farnel (m. 14 December 1944)
- Occupation: Farmer

Ralph Melville Warren (4 March 1882 – 6 May 1954) was a Canadian politician, a member of the House of Commons of Canada and the Legislative Assembly of Ontario. He was born in Wilberforce Township, Ontario where he attended secondary school and became a farmer by career.

In the 1919 Ontario election, he was elected under the United Farmers of Ontario party which formed the government. He held the Renfrew North provincial seat for one term until defeated in the 1923 election.

From 1930 to 1938 he was reeve of Wilberforce Township.

Warren was elected to federal Parliament for the Liberal party at the Renfrew North riding in a by-election on 5 April 1937 then re-elected for full terms in 1940, 1945 and 1949. Faced with poor health, Warren did not seek another federal term in the 1953 election. He died the following year, survived by his second wife, Eva Marion Farnel.
