= Thomas Hincks (naturalist) =

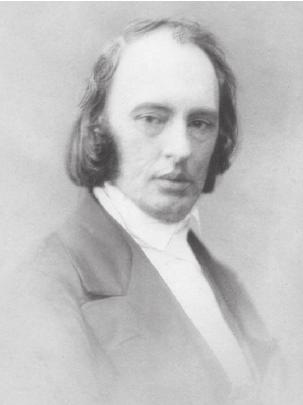
- Thomas Hincks
- Born: 1818; Exeter, England
- Died: 25 January 1899 (aged 80–81); Clifton, Somerset, England
- Education: University of London
- Known for: zoophytes bryozoa
- Scientific career
- Fields: Natural history

Thomas Hincks (1818 – 25 January 1899) was a British Unitarian minister and a naturalist known for his work on zoophytes and bryozoa.

== Life ==
He was born the son of the William Hincks in Exeter, Devon. He studied at Manchester New College from 1833 to 1839 (while it was, confusingly, in York) and received his B.A. from the University of London.

He became a Unitarian minister and served at Cork (1839), Dublin (1842), Warrington (1844), Exeter (1846), Sheffield (1852) and Leeds (1855). He lost his voice whilst at Mill Hill Chapel in Leeds, and had to resign. He retired to Clifton and studied zoophytes, especially in Devon.

He published A history of the British hydroid zoophytes (1868) and A history of the British marine Polyzoa (1880).

In June 1872, he was elected a Fellow of the Royal Society.

At least six genera and 13 species of invertebrates are named in his honour.

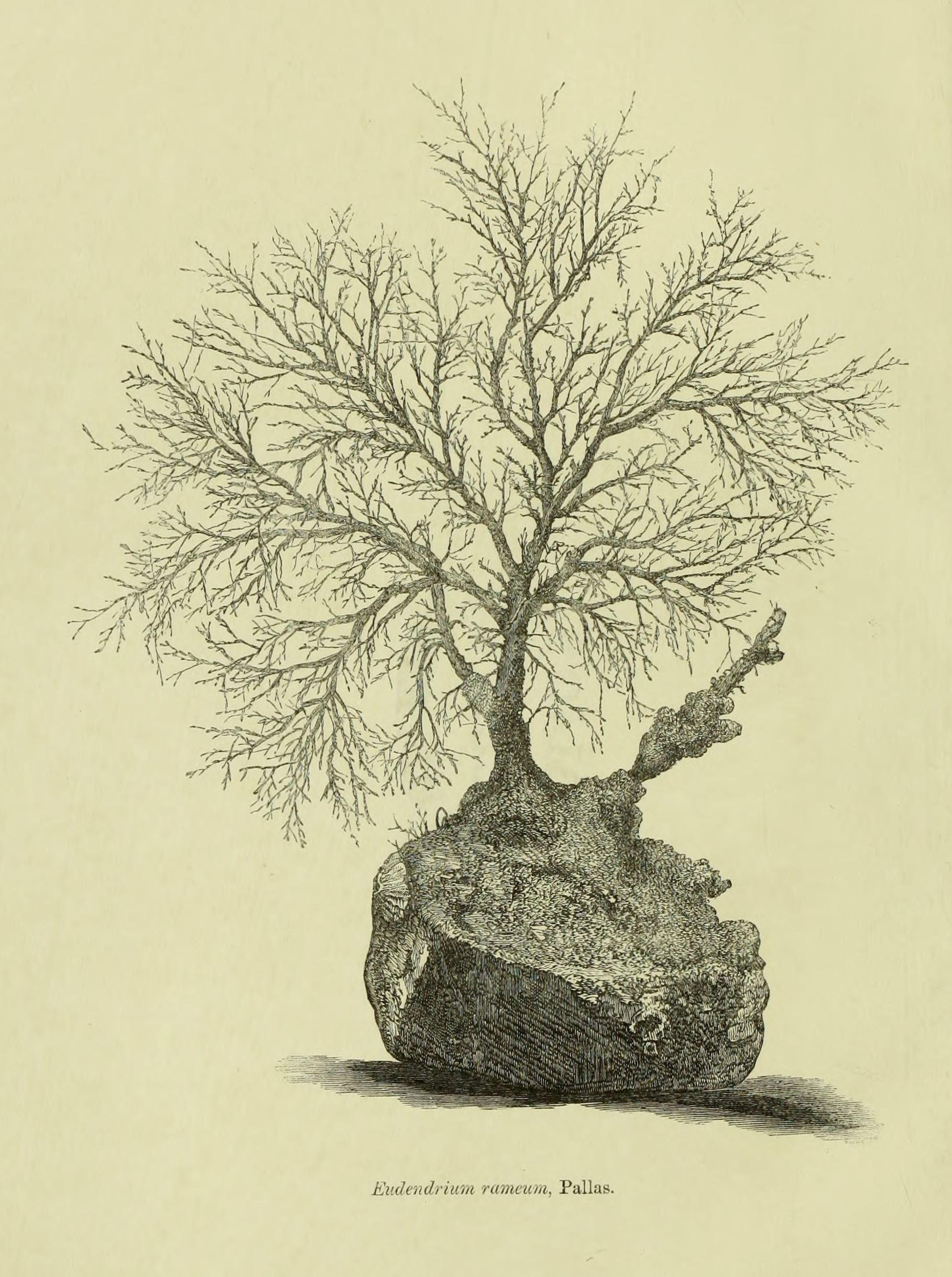
Eudendrium rameum. Frontispiece from A History of the British Hydroid Zoophytes (1868)
