= Banque Ville-Marie =

Canadian bank

- Industry: Banking
- Founded: 14 June 1872
- Defunct: 1899
- Fate: Liquidated after a bank run
- Headquarters: Montreal, Canada
- Products: Banking services, loans

The Banque Ville-Marie (lit. 'Ville-Marie Bank') was a Canadian bank based in Montreal, Quebec. It was active from 1872 until 1899. It was a French Canadian bank.

== History ==
The Banque Ville-Marie was incorporated on 14 June 1872. Its head office was in Montreal, Quebec. Its original board of directors was mainly composed of French Canadians merchants. It started with an authorized capital of $1,000,000, of which $202,000 was paid up. Little is known about its early history; it did not publish annual report in local newspaper as other Canadian banks did.

The board of directors was seemingly oblivious to the economic circumstances of the 1870s. They doubled the amount of loans given by the bank in the midst of an economic depression, resulting in many of them turning bad (the overdue debt grew from $15 000 in 1875 to $200 000 in 1876). The bank's affairs had deteriorated so much that a merger with the Metropolitan Bank was considered in fall 1876. The board of directors was instead changed, and in 1877 only one of the original directors remained. However, the new directors continued their predecessors' policies, and by 1879, 21% of the bank's loans were overdue (compared to 6% for the industry).

The Banque Ville-Marie tapped into francophones' savings before other francophone institutions. The deposits obtained by its branches at St-Cuthbert and Trois-Rivières were used to finance the bank's expansion. Despite a great amount of bad loans, it enjoyed high profits and dividends.

Due to lack of capital, the Banque Ville-Marie avoided "wasting" any of its branches in town served by another French-speaking bank. When the Banque d'Hochelaga opened a branch in Louisville, the Banque Ville-Marie closed its branch in the city and instead opened a branch in the bankless towns of L'Épiphanie and Lachute.

=== First suspension and reopening (1879-1881) ===
The bank suspended its operation on 8 August 1879 due to a bank run caused by the suspension of the Mechanics Bank (May), Consolidated Bank (July) and Exchange Bank (7 August). It reopened in early November to avoid permanent closure due to a clause of the Bank Act, but only because of loans given on the condition that the bank be liquidated.

Reports emerged that the bank borrowed large sums using its own capital as security, had accepted dubious paper as security for its stock and made loans that had since halved in worth. The president Dumesnil and all directors except three were purged and a new board committed to liquidation led by Louis Archambault was elected in January 1880.

On August 3, a meeting to appoint liquidators was held, but shareholders instead decided by a close vote to re-open the bank, reasoning that the worst of the depression had passed. The bank reopened, and in 1881 legislation to reduce the capital stock by half was passed. It was planned to use these funds for writing off bad debts and setting up a reserve fund.

=== William Weir's takeover (1881-1899) ===
From 1881 to 1899, the Banque Ville-Marie was operated by William Weir 'as if it were his own personal property'. He purchased 252 of the bank's shares in 1880 and became involved in its reopening, encouraging shareholders to re-open the bank. After becoming the bank's largest shareholder, he was elected as director, then chosen as president of the bank in June 1881.

Weir gradually replaced French-speaking directors with his English-speaking friends and by 1894 there were no French-speakers on the board of directors. His friends acquired large amount of stocks, and by 1895, 65% of all shares in circulation were held by anglophones. Weir became the bank's cashier in 1892, and without scrutiny, he and his associates appropriated bank funds for themselves, notably by making false loans to inexistent companies.

During this period, the bank successfully mobilized the savings of francophone Québécois to finance its operations. The number of branches grew from one to twenty between 1881 and 1899, all located in towns with majority French Canadian populations and most without banking facilities. The saving deposits reached $300,000 in 1883; $600,000 in 1893 and $1,250,000 in 1899 (over half of the bank's liabilities). Purchase of the bank's stock was made a condition for opening the bank's first branches in the region north of Montreal, and in 1881 residents of the region had invested $200,000 in the bank. By 1891, its branch operations had shifted south of Montreal, with nearly a quarter of the bank's reported capital coming from the region.

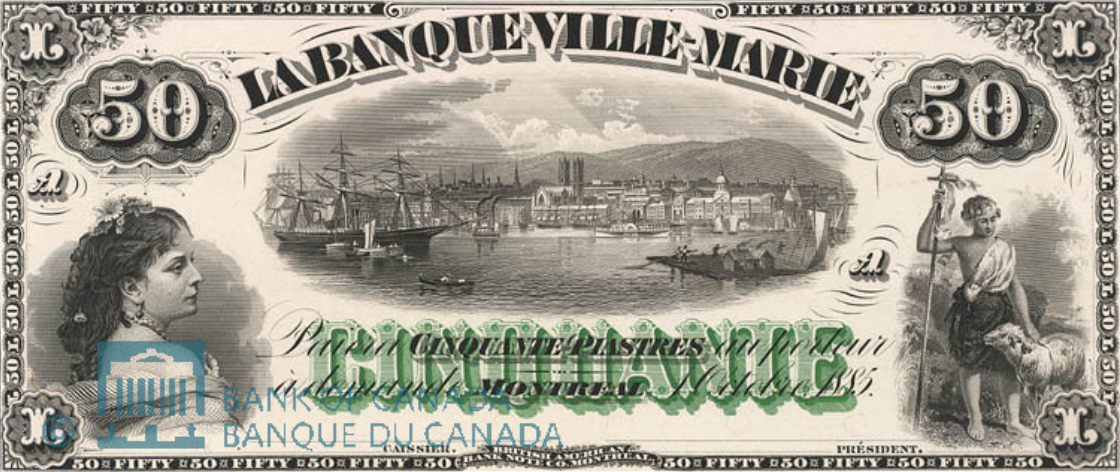
Banque Ville-Marie's 50 dollars note

The note circulation was also increased to finance the bank's operations, even above legal limits. The bank was ordered to reduce note circulation by the Department of Justice, but the note circulation was simply underreported.

The government exercised practically no control over the bank, which regularly and knowingly made false reports. The bank illegally traded its own stock with the government's full knowledge, and bank funds were gambled in bucket shops. In 1892, the bank illegally reduced its capital without the government's autorization.

Despite making large amounts of loans, the Banque Ville-Marie made low profits due to the often dubious nature of these loans - yet also paid high dividends. The bank's reserve funds never exceeded $20,000 and it could not write off bad debts.

=== Second suspension and dissolution (1898-1899) ===
The Banque Ville-Marie depended on deposits, which Weir bragged were all lent out. When it was reported by the press that a bank official had stolen $58,000 from the bank, depositors queued to withdraw funds and the bank closed its doorson 25 July 1899. After its failure, the press emphasized its Englishness to maintain confidence in French Canadian banks. Indeed, the bank's president, general manager and board of directors were all English Canadians by 1899. Customers felt betrayed that the bank's name had hidden its Englishness and that the government allowed the bank to continue operations despite its suspicious affairs. The liquidation of the bank was completed in 1905, and depositors were given 17 cents for each dollar given to the bank. Its outstanding note circulation was redeemed. Weir and others were prosecuted with theft and making fraudulent returns.

== Presidents ==
1872-???? Denis-Émery Papineau

????-1880 G.N Dumesnil

1880-1881 Louis Archambault

1881-1899 William Weir
