= Ira Delbert Cotnam =

Canadian politician (1883–1966)

Member of Parliament for Renfrew North
- In office October 1925 – October 1935
- Preceded by: Matthew McKay
- Succeeded by: Matthew McKay

Personal details
- Born: Ira Delbert Cotnam; 19 December 1883 Pontiac County, Quebec
- Died: 25 February 1966 (aged 82)
- Party: Conservative
- Spouse(s): Mary Godwin m. 29 December 1909
- Profession: physician

Ira Delbert Cotnam (19 December 1883 – 25 February 1966) was a Canadian politician and physician. Cotnam served as a Conservative member of the House of Commons of Canada. He was born in Pontiac County, Quebec and became a physician.

Cotnam attended secondary school at Pembroke Collegiate Institute, then proceeded to Queen's University where he received his medical degrees (MD, CM). His postgraduate work was conducted at hospitals in New York City, Chicago and London. Queen's University awarded him with a gold medal in surgery.

He was first elected to Parliament at the Renfrew North riding in the 1925 general election, winning over Liberal incumbent Matthew McKay after an unsuccessful campaign there in the 1921 election. He was re-elected in 1926 federal election and 1930 federal election. During the decade when Cotnam held Renfrew North, he was challenged by McKay in each election. In the 1935 election, McKay defeated Cotnam to win back the riding. Cotnam made two further unsuccessful attempts to win the seat in 1949 and 1953, when he campaigned as a Progressive Conservative.
