= Edward Hincks =

Irish Assyriologist (1792–1866)

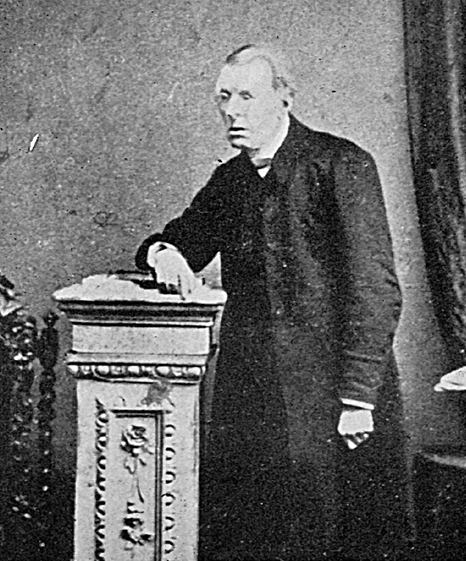
- Born: 19 August 1792; Cork, Ireland
- Died: 13 December 1866 (aged 74); Killyleagh, Ireland
- Education: Trinity College Dublin
- Occupations: Clergyman; Egyptologist; Assyriologist
- Known for: Decipherment of cuneiform
- Spouse: Jane Dorothea Boyd (m. 1823)
- Children: 4
- Father: Thomas Dix Hincks
- Relatives: William Hincks (brother); Francis Hincks (brother)
- Church: Church of Ireland

Edward Hincks (19 August 1792 – 3 December 1866) was an Irish Church of Ireland clergyman, Egyptologist and Assyriologist, known for the decipherment of cuneiform.

== Early life ==
Edward Hincks was born on 19 August 1792 in Cork to Anne Hincks (née Boult; 1767–1835) and Rev. Thomas Dix Hincks, a Unitarian minister, orientalist and naturalist. The eldest of eight siblings, Hincks was the elder brother of Francis Hincks and William Hincks. His father was one of the founders of the Belfast Natural History and Philosophical Society.

Edward Hincks was educated at home by his father and at Midleton College before entering Trinity College Dublin. He was elected a Scholar of the College in 1810, and in 1812 won the Gold Medal and Bishop Law's Prize for Mathematics. Standing against Thomas Romney Robinson, he won through and was elected a Fellow of the College in 1813 and four years later took his M.A.

== Clerical career ==
In 1819, following the death of Thomas Meredith, he was presented to the Rectory of Ardtrea in County Tyrone. Though Ardtrea was a valuable and highly prized Rectory, it was also isolated for a young bachelor and he resigned the position in 1826, taking up the Rectory in Killyleagh, County Down - an office he was to hold for the remainder of his life.

== Orientalist career ==
The undemanding nature of his clerical duties left him with more than enough time to pursue his interest in ancient languages. His first love was for the hieroglyphic writing of ancient Egypt. By 1823 the Frenchman Jean-Francois Champollion had succeeded in deciphering this enigmatic script, but Hincks made a number of discoveries of his own which established him as an authority of ancient philology.

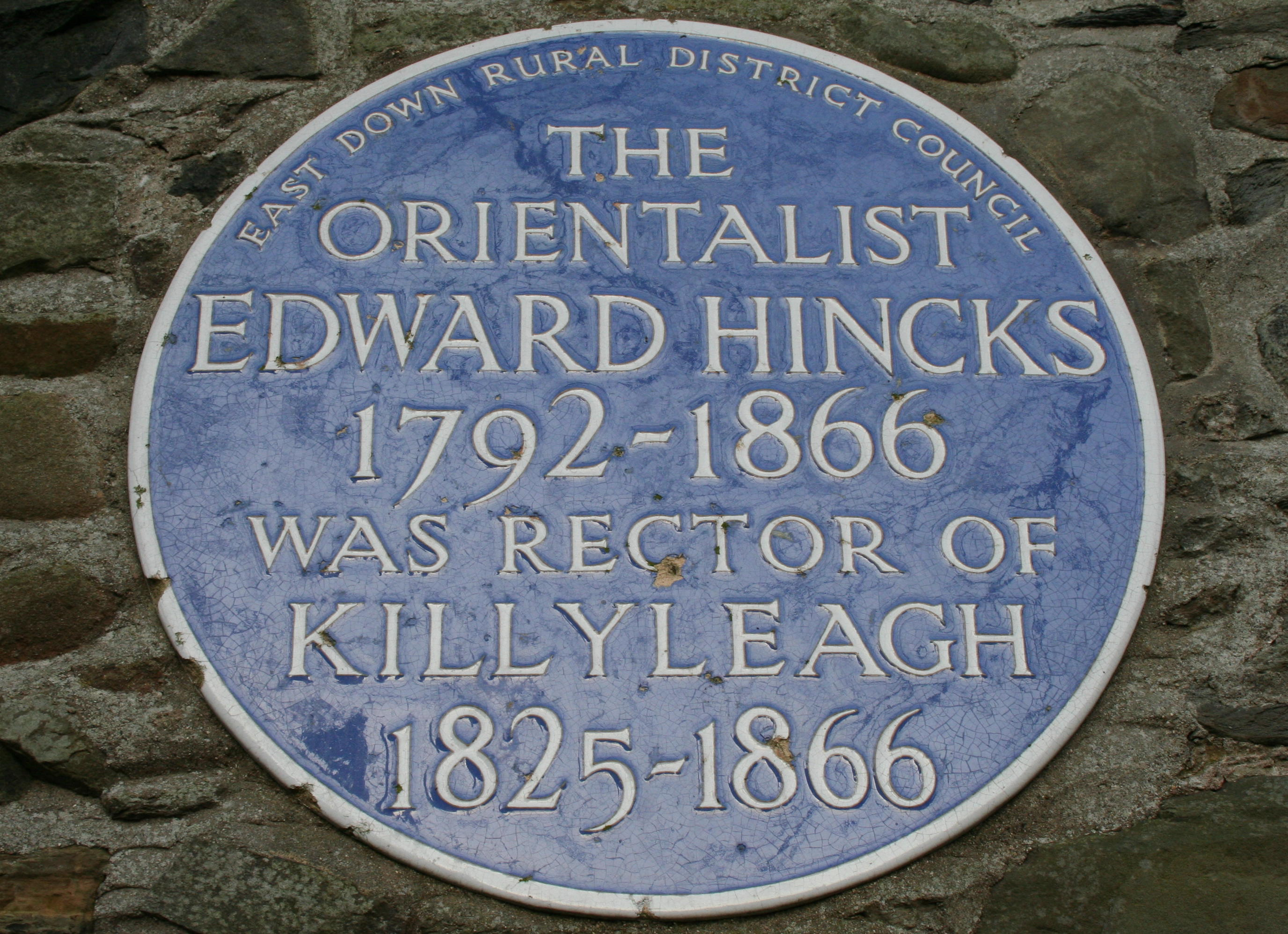
Plaque to Edward Hincks in Killyleagh, County Down

In the 1830s he turned his attention to Old Persian cuneiform, a form of writing that the Achaemenid emperors had used for monumental inscriptions in their own language. Working independently of the leading Orientalist of the day, Sir Henry Creswicke Rawlinson, Hincks deduced the essentially syllabic nature of this script and correctly deduced the values of the Persian vowels.

In 1835 he supervised the unrolling of the mummified body of Takabuti at the Belfast Natural History Society. Hincks deciphered the Egyptian hieroglyphs, which revealed that she was mistress of a great house.

In 1839 and 1846 he published on Egyptian Chronology, identifying Thutmose III, who Manetho called Memphres, with Menophres, who Theon of Alexandria had said reigned at the start of the Egyptian Great Year - a reference to what is known as the "Era of Menophres".

=== Akkadian cuneiform ===
Hincks' greatest achievement was the decipherment of the ancient language and writing of Babylon and Assyria: Akkadian cuneiform but his attention might never have been drawn to the relatively new topic of Assyriology had it not been for a lucky find during 1842.

During that year the archaeologist Paul Émile Botta uncovered the remains of the ancient city of Nineveh, the capital of the Assyrian Empire. Among the treasures unearthed by Botta and his successors, including Austen Henry Layard, with whom Hincks exchanged many letters, was the famous Library of Assurbanipal, a royal archive containing tens of thousands of baked clay tablets. These tablets were inscribed in a strange illegible form of writing known as cuneiform. Three men were to play a decisive role in the decipherment of this script: Hincks, Rawlinson and a young German-born scholar called Jules Oppert.

Hincks deduced correctly that cuneiform writing had been invented by one of the earliest civilisations of Mesopotamia (a people later identified by Oppert as the Sumerians), who then bequeathed it to later states such as Babylon, Assyria and Elam. In 1848 he was awarded the Cunningham Medal of the Royal Irish Academy for his achievements.

By 1850 Hincks had come to a number of important conclusions regarding the nature of Assyro-Babylonian cuneiform. He believed that the script was essentially syllabic, comprising open syllables (e.g."ki") as well as more complex closed syllables (e.g. "mur"). He also discovered that cuneiform characters were "polyphonic," by which he meant that a single sign could have several different readings depending on the context in which it occurred.

By now Hincks had recognised a large number of determinatives and had correctly established their readings. But not everyone was convinced by the claims being made by the Irishman and his distinguished colleagues. Some philologists even suggested that they were simply inventing multiple readings of the signs to suit their own translations.

In 1857 the versatile English Orientalist William Henry Fox Talbot suggested that an undeciphered cuneiform text be given to several different Assyriologists to translate. If, working independently of one another, they came up with reasonably similar translations, it would surely dispel the doubts surrounding their claims.

As it happened, Talbot and the "holy trinity of cuneiform" - Hincks, Rawlinson and Oppert - were in London in 1857. Edwin Norris, secretary of the Royal Asiatic Society, gave each of them a copy of a recently discovered inscription from the reign of the Assyrian emperor Tiglath-Pileser I. A jury of experts was empanelled to examine the resulting translations and assess their accuracy.

In all essential points the translations produced by the four scholars were found to be in close agreement with one another. There were of course some slight discrepancies. The inexperienced Talbot had made a number of mistakes, and Oppert's translation contained a few doubtful passages due to his unfamiliarity with the English language. But Hincks' and Rawlinson's versions were virtually identical. The jury declared itself satisfied, and the decipherment of cuneiform was adjudged a fait accompli.

== Later life ==
The Reverend Edward Hincks devoted the remaining years of his life to the study of cuneiform and made further significant contributions to its decipherment. He died at his rectory in Killyleagh on 3 December 1866 at the age of 74. He was survived by a wife and four daughters.
