= William Hincks =

Irish Unitarian minister

Rev. William Hincks
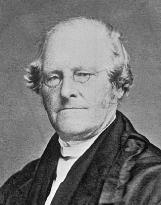
- Hincks, William (186..) University of Toronto
- Born: 16 April 1794; Cork, Ireland
- Died: 10 September 1871 (aged 77); Toronto, Canada
- Occupations: Unitarian minister and professor of natural history
- Spouses: Maria Ann Yandell (m. 1817; died 1849): Sarah Maria (m. date unknown)
- Children: 8

William Hincks FLS (16 April 1794 – 10 September 1871) was an Irish Unitarian minister, theologian and professor of natural history. He was the first professor of natural history at University College, Toronto and president of the Canadian Institute (now the Royal Canadian Institute). He was also the first editor of the Unitarian magazine The Inquirer.

== Early life and ministries ==
Hincks was born on 16 April 1794 in Cork, Ireland, the son of Thomas Dix Hincks, an orientalist and naturalist, and Anne Boult. One of eight siblings, Hincks was the brother of Francis Hincks and Edward Hincks. His father was one of the founders of the Belfast Natural History and Philosophical Society.

He was educated in Belfast and trained as a minister in Manchester College, York from 1810 to 1815. He served in Cork from 1815 to 1818, then moved to Exeter where he ministered from 1818 to 1822. In 1822 he joined the Unitarian church and served as a minister at Renshaw Street Unitarian Chapel in Liverpool until 1827. He didn't work again as a minister until 1839, when he moved to London.

== Teaching ==
In 1827 he returned to Manchester College, York to teach Mathematics and philosophy. While he was there he became involved with the Philosophical Radicals. He stayed there until 1834 and in 1839 took a break from teaching to resume his work with the church, serving in 1845 as the minister at what later became Rosslyn Hill Unitarian Chapel in Hampstead.

In 1849 he became the first professor of natural history at Queen's College, Cork, the same year as the college started teaching and 4 years after it was founded. While there he had a major role in the development of the botanical gardens, in which he hoped to represent all the known orders of plants that he could grow in the Irish climate. He was also involved in developing the museum and herbaria.

In 1853 he travelled to Canada, where he became the first professor of natural history at University College, Toronto. This was a somewhat controversial appointment as he was chosen over Thomas Henry Huxley who had the backing of a number of well respected botanists including Charles Darwin. It was suspected that his success over Huxley was due to the influence of his brother Francis Hincks, who was Premier of the Province of Canada at the time. He was said to be well like by his students there, although his ideas and teaching style was often seen as outdated. He was strongly opposed to Darwinism, preferring the Quinarian taxonomic system.

== Other work ==
Hincks was elected as a fellow of the Linnean Society, a society for the study of taxonomy and natural history, in 1826. In 1828, while teaching at Manchester College, York, he became the first Honorary Curator of Botany in the museum of the Yorkshire Philosophical Society (latterly known as the Yorkshire Museum). The society was formed in 1822 as a charitable organisation aimed at promoting the natural sciences, archaeology and history. Following the construction of the museum and its associated gardens, Hincks planned to organise the plants using de Candolle's system though only a small amount had been planted to this scheme by the time of his departure from the post. Hincks had spent most of time working with the herbarium collections rather than the gardens.

While teaching and serving as a clergyman, Hincks also carried out editing and publishing work. He was the first editor of the Unitarian magazine The Inquirer from 1842 to 1847 during his time in London. His work there was influenced by his interest in education and his desire for an end to slavery and the death penalty.

In Canada he served as president of the Canadian Institute from 1869 to 1871 and became editor of their journal, the Canadian Journal. Through this he published a number of books including:

- Hincks, William (1862). Materials for a fauna canadensis. the Canadian Journal. ISBN 978-0665496882.
- Hincks, William (1865). On chorisis as an explanation of certain vegetable structures. the Canadian Journal. ISBN 978-0665579332.

== Personal life ==
In 1817 Hincks married Maria Ann Yandell and together they had 8 children, five boys and three girls. One of their sons Thomas Hincks (1818–1899) followed in his fathers footsteps and also became a minister and naturalist. Yandell died in 1849 and Hincks remarried Sarah Maria sometime before leaving England, her maiden name is not known. William Hincks died in Toronto on 10 September 1871 at the age of 77.
