= Algonquin—Renfrew—Pembroke =

Federal electoral district in Ontario, Canada

Coordinates: 45.63°N 77.41°W

Ontario electoral district
- Interactive map of riding boundaries (previously named Renfrew—Nipissing—Pembroke) from the 2004 federal election

Federal electoral district
- Legislature: House of Commons
MP
Cheryl Gallant
Conservative
- District created: 1976
- First contested: 1979
- Last contested: 2021
- District webpage: profile, map

Demographics
- Population (2011): 102,537
- Electors (2015): 77,520
- Area (km²): 11,452.85
- Pop. density (per km²): 9
- Census division(s): Nipissing, Renfrew
- Census subdivision(s): Petawawa, Pembroke, Arnprior, Laurentian Valley, Renfrew, McNab/Braeside, Whitewater, Deep River, Madawaska Valley, Bonnechere Valley

Algonquin—Renfrew—Pembroke (known as Renfrew—Nipissing—Pembroke until 2025) is a federal electoral district in Ontario, Canada, that has been represented in the House of Commons since 1979.

It is represented by Cheryl Gallant of the Conservative Party.

Renfrew—Nipissing—Pembroke includes all of Renfrew County and a small section of Nipissing District around Algonquin Provincial Park.

The only city in the riding is the City of Pembroke; towns include Arnprior, Cobden, Deep River, Petawawa and Renfrew. Villages include Barry's Bay, Golden Lake, Pikwakanagan First Nation, Douglas, Calabogie, Eganville, Wilno, Killaloe, Palmer Rapids and Braeside. Other lower-tier rural municipalities include Admaston/Bromley, North Algona Wilberforce, Bonnechere Valley, Laurentian Valley, Laurentian Hills, Whitewater Region, Madawaska Valley, Killaloe-Hagarty-Richards, Head Clare and Maria, Greater Madawaska, Horton, and Brudenell Lyndoch Raglan, which contain rural areas such as Chalk River, Rankin, Ruby, Combermere, Basin Depot, Round Lake Centre and Deacon.

== Geography ==
It consists of the County of Renfrew; and parts of the Territorial District of Nipissing

== Political geography ==
Most of the riding was fairly Conservative from 2004 -2015. In the 2004, 2006, 2008, and 2011 elections, Deep River was the only significant community which voted Liberal. Pikwakanagan, a First Nations reserve, also voted Liberal, and the Township of Wylie had a tie vote. A small handful of polls in Pembroke voted Liberal, but most of the city voted Conservative.

These demographics changed by the 2015 Federal Election, which saw the Liberals hold onto Pikwakanagan and Deep River, and gain most of the polls in Pembroke, Petawawa, and Eganville along with a number in Arnprior, and Renfrew although most of the rural districts voted Conservative.

== Demographics ==
According to the 2021 Canadian census

Ethnic groups: 85.4% White, 11.3% Indigenous
Languages: 89.3% English, 4.9% French
Religions: 66.7% Christian (34.5% Catholic, 7.0% United Church, 5.4% Anglican, 5.1% Lutheran, 1.8% Presbyterian, 1.7% Baptist, 1.6% Pentecostal, 9.6% Other), 31.6% None
Median income: $42,000 (2020)
Average income: $50,200 (2020)

== History ==
Renfrew—Nipissing—Pembroke was created in 1976 from parts of Frontenac—Lennox and Addington, Lanark—Renfrew—Carleton and Renfrew North—Nipissing East ridings.

It consisted of the County of Renfrew, excluding the Townships of Bagot and Blythfield and McNab, and the part of the Territorial District of Nipissing including and lying easterly of the Townships of Mattawan, Papineau, Cameron, Deacon, Anglin, Dickson, Preston, Airy and Sabine.

The electoral district was abolished in 1987 when it was redistributed into Renfrew riding. In 1989, Renfrew riding was renamed "Renfrew—Nipissing—Pembroke".

The new riding consisted of the County of Renfrew, and the part of the Territorial District of Nipissing lying east of and including the townships of Deacon and Lister, and east of but excluding the townships of Freswick, Bower and Sproule, and east of and including the townships of Airy and Sabine.

In 1996, the Nipissing part was redefined as being the part of the district lying east of and including the townships of Deacon and Lister, east of and excluding the townships of Freswick, Bower, Sproule and Nightingale, and east of and including the Township of Sabine.

In 2003, it was given its current boundaries as described above.

This riding was unchanged during the 2012 electoral redistribution.

Following the 2022 Canadian federal electoral redistribution, the riding was renamed Algonquin—Renfrew—Pembroke. This change came into effect upon the calling of the 2025 Canadian federal election.

== Members of Parliament ==
This riding has elected the following members of Parliament:

Parliament	Years	Member	Party
Renfrew—Nipissing—Pembroke; Riding created from Frontenac—Lennox and Addington, Lanark—Renfrew—Carleton and Renfrew North—Nipissing East
31st	1979–1980	Len Hopkins	Liberal
32nd	1980–1984	Len Hopkins	Liberal
33rd	1984–1988	Len Hopkins	Liberal
Renfrew
34th	1988–1989	Len Hopkins	Liberal
Renfrew—Nipissing—Pembroke
34th	1989–1993	Len Hopkins	Liberal
35th	1993–1997	Len Hopkins	Liberal
36th	1997–2000	Hec Clouthier	Liberal
37th	2000–2003	Cheryl Gallant	Alliance
37th	2003–2004	Cheryl Gallant	Conservative
38th	2004–2006	Cheryl Gallant	Conservative
39th	2006–2008	Cheryl Gallant	Conservative
40th	2008–2011	Cheryl Gallant	Conservative
41st	2011–2015	Cheryl Gallant	Conservative
42nd	2015–2019	Cheryl Gallant	Conservative
43rd	2019–2021	Cheryl Gallant	Conservative
44th	2021–2025	Cheryl Gallant	Conservative
Algonquin—Renfrew—Pembroke
45th	2025–present	Cheryl Gallant	Conservative

== Riding associations ==
Riding associations are the local branches of national political parties:

Party	Association name	President	HQ City
Conservative	Renfrew—Nipissing—Pembroke Conservative Association	Barry Schimmens	Petawawa
Green	Algonquin—Renfrew—Pembroke Green Party Association	Ian Pineau	Lunenburg, Nova Scotia
Liberal	Algonquin—Renfrew—Pembroke Federal Liberal Association	Cyndi Mills	Petawawa
New Democratic	Algonquin—Renfrew—Pembroke Federal NDP Riding Association	Dez Bair-Patel	Pembroke

== Election results ==
View source data.
Graph of election results in Renfrew—Nippissing—Pembroke (minor parties that never got 2% of the vote or didn't run consistently are omitted)

=== Algonquin—Renfrew—Pembroke, 2025 – present ===
2025 Canadian federal election
Party	Candidate	Votes	%	±%
Conservative	Cheryl Gallant	37,333	55.71	+6.20
Liberal	Cyndi Mills	25,338	37.81	+18.44
New Democratic	Eileen Jones-Whyte	2,469	3.68	−17.28
United	Randy Briand	909	1.36	N/A
Green	Danilo Velasquez	618	0.92	−0.98
Independent	Seth Malina	229	0.34	
Independent	Stefan Klietsch	122	0.18	-0.46
Total valid votes		67,018	99.44	
Total rejected ballots		375	0.56	-0.22
Turnout		67,393	72.36	+5.82
Eligible voters		93,133		
Conservative hold		Swing		−6.12
Source: Elections Canada

=== Renfrew—Nipissing—Pembroke, 1989 – 2025 ===
View source data.
Graph of election results in Renfrew—Nippissing—Pembroke (minor parties that never got 2% of the vote or didn't run consistently are omitted)

2021 Canadian federal election
Party	Candidate	Votes	%	±%	Expenditures
Conservative	Cheryl Gallant	28,967	49.50	-3.22	$53,347.30
New Democratic	Jodie Primeau	12,263	20.96	+6.10	$59,124.68
Liberal	Cyndi Mills	11,335	19.37	-0.16	$47,224.08
People's	David Ainsworth	4,469	7.64	+5.12	$0.00
Green	Michael Lariviere	1,111	1.90	-3.58	$2,038.46
Independent	Stefan Klietsch	373	0.64	N/A	$2,177.57
Total valid votes/Expense limit		58,518	99.22	–	$122,718.35
Total rejected ballots		459	0.78		
Turnout		58,977	66.54		
Eligible voters		88,637			
Source: Elections Canada

2019 Canadian federal election: Renfrew—Nipissing—Pembroke
Party	Candidate	Votes	%	±%	Expenditures
Conservative	Cheryl Gallant	31,080	52.72	+6.89	$66,041.60
Liberal	Ruben Marini	11,532	19.56	-13.10	$45,587.70
New Democratic	Eileen Jones-Whyte	8,786	14.90	+6.34	$16,662.56
Green	Ian Pineau	3,230	5.48	+3.55	$3,432.43
People's	David Ainsworth	1,463	2.48		none listed
Independent	Dan Criger	1,125	1.91		$9,173.74
Independent	Dheerendra Kumar	917	1.56		none listed
Veterans Coalition	Robert Cherrin	358	0.61		none listed
Libertarian	Stefan Klietsch	266	0.45		none listed
Independent	Jonathan Davis	200	0.34		none listed
Total valid votes/expense limit		58,957	99.21		
Total rejected ballots		471	0.79	+0.33	
Turnout		59,428	68.79	-3.93	
Eligible voters		86,387			
Conservative hold		Swing		+9.99	
Source: Elections Canada

2015 Canadian federal election
Party	Candidate	Votes	%	±%	Expenditures
Conservative	Cheryl Gallant	26,195	45.83	-7.60	$57,534.69
Liberal	Jeff Lehoux	18,666	32.66	+19.93	$52,131.48
Independent	Hec Clouthier	6,300	11.02	-7.68	$64,551.59
New Democratic	Dan McCarthy	4,893	8.56	-4.87	$29,224.75
Green	Stefan Klietsch	1,105	1.93	+0.22	$3,045.10
Total valid votes/Expense limit		57,159	99.54	–	$223,209.96
Total rejected ballots		264	0.46	–	
Turnout		57,423	72.73	+5.84	
Eligible voters		78,959			
Conservative hold		Swing		-13.8	
Source: Elections Canada

2011 Canadian federal election
Party	Candidate	Votes	%	±%	Expenditures
Conservative	Cheryl Gallant	27,462	53.43	-7.66	–
Independent	Hec Clouthier	9,611	18.70	–	–
New Democratic	Eric Burton	6,903	13.43	+2.50	–
Liberal	Christine Tabbert	6,545	12.73	-7.84	–
Green	Rosanne Van Schie	877	1.71	-5.05	–
Total valid votes/Expense limit		51,398	100.00		–
Total rejected ballots		166	0.32	-0.08	
Turnout		51,564	66.89	+3.74	
Eligible voters		77,082	–	–	

2008 Canadian federal election
Party	Candidate	Votes	%	±%	Expenditures
Conservative	Cheryl Gallant	28,908	61.09	+3.4	$56,541
Liberal	Carole Devine	9,737	20.57	-3.5	$67,673
New Democratic	Sue McSheffrey	5,175	10.93	-1.6	$31,328
Green	Ben Hoffman	3,201	6.76	+5.7	$7,564
Independent	Denis Gagné	293	0.61	–	–
Total valid votes/Expense limit		47,314	100.0		$87,348
Total rejected ballots		188	0.4	–	
Turnout		47,502	63.15	–	

2006 Canadian federal election
Party	Candidate	Votes	%	±%
Conservative	Cheryl Gallant	29,992	57.7	+2.6
Liberal	Don Lindsay	12,551	24.1	-5.5
New Democratic	Sue McSheffrey	6,505	12.5	+1.0
Green	Gordon S. McLeod	1,601	3.1	+0.7
Independent	Paul Kelly	1,338	2.6	*
Total valid votes		51,987	100.0	

2004 Canadian federal election
Party	Candidate	Votes	%	±%
Conservative	Cheryl Gallant	27,494	55.1	-0.4
Liberal	Rob Jamieson	14,798	29.6	-9.4
New Democratic	Sue McSheffrey	5,720	11.5	+8.0
Green	Gordon S. McLeod	1,191	2.4	
Marijuana	Stanley Sambey	714	1.4	-0.2
Total valid votes		49,917	100.0	

Note: Conservative vote is compared to the total of the Canadian Alliance vote and Progressive Conservative vote in 2000 election.

2000 Canadian federal election
Party	Candidate	Votes	%	±%
Alliance	Cheryl Gallant	20,634	44.2	+17.4
Liberal	Hec Clouthier	18,211	39.0	-1.3
Progressive Conservative	Bob Amaron	5,287	11.3	-14.1
New Democratic	Ole Hendrickson	1,607	3.4	-3.2
Marijuana	Stanley E. Sambey	762	1.6	
Independent	Thane C. Heins	121	0.3	*
Natural Law	André Giordano	78	0.2	-0.2
Total valid votes		46,700	100.0	

Note: Canadian Alliance vote is compared to the Reform vote in 1997 election.

1997 Canadian federal election
Party	Candidate	Votes	%	±%
Liberal	Hec Clouthier	19,569	40.3	-10.3
Reform	Ed Pinnell	13,035	26.8	+14.6
Progressive Conservative	Bob Gould	12,352	25.4	+11.6
New Democratic	Barbara Clarke	3,242	6.7	+4.0
Canadian Action	Gay Curran-Desmond	236	0.5	
Natural Law	André Giordano	183	0.4	+0.1
Total valid votes		48,617	100.0	

1993 Canadian federal election
Party	Candidate	Votes	%	±%
Liberal	Len Hopkins	25,725	50.5	-3.8
Independent	Hec Clouthier	10,287	20.2	
Progressive Conservative	Milton Stevenson	7,039	13.8	-18.2
Reform	Edward Pinnell	6,209	12.2	
New Democratic	Barbara Clarke	1,345	2.6	-9.9
Abolitionist	Murray Reid	145	0.3	
Natural Law	Daphne Quance	143	0.3	
Total valid votes		50,893	100.0	

=== Renfrew, 1987 – 1989 ===
1988 Canadian federal election
Party	Candidate	Votes	%	±%
Liberal	Len Hopkins	25,558	54.3	+9.2
Progressive Conservative	Ben Hoffman	15,081	32.1	-13.0
New Democratic	Elizabeth Ives-Ruyter	5,879	12.5	+2.7
Confederation of Regions	Murray Reid	520	1.1	
Total valid votes		47,038	100.0	

=== Renfrew—Nipissing—Pembroke, 1976 – 1987 ===
Graph of election results in Renfrew—Nippissing—Pembroke (minor parties that never got 2% of the vote or didn't run consistently are omitted)

1984 Canadian federal election
Party	Candidate	Votes	%	±%
Liberal	Len Hopkins	19,502	45.1	-6.6
Progressive Conservative	Don Whillans	19,464	45.0	+12.4
New Democratic	Gavin Murphy	4,253	9.8	-5.8
Total valid votes		43,219	100.0	

1980 Canadian federal election
Party	Candidate	Votes	%	±%
Liberal	Len Hopkins	20,529	51.7	+2.5
Progressive Conservative	Bob Amaron	12,966	32.7	-0.8
New Democratic	Don Breault	6,200	15.6	-1.7
Total valid votes		39,695	100.0	

1979 Canadian federal election
Party	Candidate	Votes	%
Liberal	Len Hopkins	20,286	49.2
Progressive Conservative	Don Sutherland	13,781	33.4
New Democratic	Don Breault	7,133	17.3
Total valid votes		41,200	100.0

== See also ==
- List of Canadian electoral districts
- Historical federal electoral districts of Canada
