= Len Hopkins =

Canadian politician

Leonard Donald Hopkins
- Official 1994 portrait

Member of Parliament for Renfrew North
- In office 1965–1972
- Preceded by: James Forgie
- Succeeded by: riding dissolved

Member of Parliament for Renfrew North—Nipissing East
- In office 1972–1979
- Preceded by: first member
- Succeeded by: riding dissolved

Member of Parliament for Renfrew—Nipissing—Pembroke
- In office 1979–1997
- Preceded by: first member
- Succeeded by: Hec Clouthier

Personal details
- Born: June 12, 1930 Argyle, Ontario, Canada
- Died: February 6, 2007 (aged 76) Ottawa, Ontario, Canada
- Party: Liberal
- Profession: School principal, teacher

Leonard Donald "Len" Hopkins (June 12, 1930 – February 6, 2007) was a Canadian politician and member of the Liberal Party of Canada.

== Biography ==
Born in Argyle, Ontario, Hopkins was educated at the Ryerson Institute of Technology, the North Bay Teacher's College, as well as receiving a B.A. from Queen's University and a teacher's certificate from the Ontario College of Education at the University of Toronto. He was a teacher and school principal and served on the municipal council for Petawawa Township from 1963 to 1965.

Hopkins represented the electoral districts of Renfrew North from 1965 to 1972, Renfrew North—Nipissing East from 1972 to 1979 and Renfrew—Nipissing—Pembroke from 1979 to 1997 in the House of Commons of Canada.

He served as Parliamentary Secretary to the Minister of Energy, Mines and Resources from 1972 to 1975 and the Minister of National Defence in 1984. He "battled his own party" over the Canadian gun registry.

Hopkins died on February 6, 2007, in the University of Ottawa Heart Institute, aged 76. He had suffered a series of cardiac setbacks. His death was attributed to pneumonia.
