= Richard Amner =

English Presbyterian (otherwise Unitarian) divine

Richard Amner (1736–1803) was an English Presbyterian (otherwise Unitarian) divine.

== Life ==
Amner was one of several children of Richard and Anne Amner, of Hinckley, Leicestershire, his baptism, in the register of the Presbyterian (otherwise Unitarian) meeting-house there, being set down for 26 April 1737. He entered Daventry Academy, to prepare for a dissenting pulpit, in 1755; he stayed there seven years, accepting the charge of the Unitarian chapel in Middlegate Street, Yarmouth, 21 July 1762. Here his theology did not prove to be in harmony with the theology of his congregation; and, preaching to them for the last time on 5 March 1764, he moved to what later became Rosslyn Hill Unitarian Chapel, Hampstead, London, where he began duty the following year, 1765.

In 1777 he left to be pastor at Coseley, Staffordshire; he retained this charge till the end of 1794, when, retiring from the ministry to Hinckley, his native town, he became one of the contributors to the Gentleman's Magazine.

George Steevens lived at Hampstead during the twelve years that Amner preached there; and in 1793 (Amner having moved away sixteen years before), when Steevens brought out his renowned edition of Shakespeare, it was found that he had put Amner's name to gross notes to which he was ashamed to put his own. This literary scandal earned much sympathy for Amner in its day. He died 8 June 1803, aged 67.

== Works ==
He published three books whilst at Hampstead:

- A Dissertation on the Weekly Festival of the Christian Church (anonymous), 1768.
- An Account of the Positive Institutions of Christianity, 1774.
- An Essay towards the Interpretation of the Prophecies of Daniel, 1776.

Later he published Considerations on the Doctrines of a Future State, in 1797.
