= John Rankin (Canadian politician) =

Canadian politician

Member of the Canadian Parliament for Renfrew North
- In office 1867–1869
- Succeeded by: Francis Hincks

Personal details
- Born: October 1820 New Glasgow, Nova Scotia, Canada
- Died: 3 September 1900 (aged 79) Toronto, Ontario, Canada
- Party: Conservative
- Spouse: Margaret Stuart Johnston
- Occupation: hotelier, merchant

John Rankin (October 1820 – 3 September 1900) was a hotelier, merchant and political figure in Ontario, Canada. He represented Renfrew North in the House of Commons of Canada from 1867 to 1869 as a Conservative.

He was born in New Glasgow, Nova Scotia, the son of Colin Rankin and Mary Robertson, and was educated in Carleton, Nova Scotia. Rankin later settled in Cobden, Ontario. He married Margaret Johnston. Rankin served six years as reeve of Ross Township. He resigned his seat in the House of Commons in 1869 to allow Francis Hincks to be elected. Rankin was warden of Renfrew County from 1865 to 1866. He served as customs collector for Bowmanville from 1870 to 1895.

He died after a long illness in 1900.

== Electoral history ==
1867 Canadian federal election: North riding of Renfrew
Party	Candidate	Votes
Conservative	John Rankin	613
Unknown	Thomas Murray	527
