= Thomas Mackie (politician) =

Canadian politician

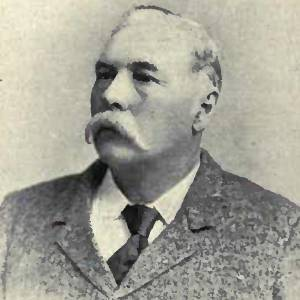
Thomas Mackie

Thomas Mackie (1840 – May 21, 1905) was a lumber merchant and political figure in Ontario, Canada. He represented Renfrew North in the House of Commons of Canada from 1896 to 1904 as a Liberal.

He was born in Bytown, Upper Canada, the son of David Mackie and Eliza Thompson, and was educated there. In 1872, he married Jessie Shaw. Mackie served on the town council for Pembroke. He was defeated when he ran for reelection in 1904. Mackie died in Pembroke at the age of 65.

His son Herbert John Mackie also served in the House of Commons.
