= Independent candidates in the 2006 Canadian federal election =

There were several independent candidates in the 2006 Canadian federal election. One independent candidate, André Arthur, was elected for the Quebec riding of Portneuf—Jacques-Cartier.

Some independent candidates have their own biography pages. Information about others may be found here.

== Quebec ==
=== Outremont: Yan Lacombe ===
Yan Lacombe has sought election to the National Assembly of Quebec and the House of Commons of Canada. Prior to the 2006 election, he ran for the Bloc pot and the Marijuana Party of Canada. He identified as a door attendant in 2006.

Electoral record
Election	Division	Party	Votes	%	Place	Winner
2003 provincial	Marguerite-D'Youville	Bloc pot	550	1.39	4/5	Pierre Moreau, Liberal
2004 federal	Outremont	Marijuana	452	1.18	6/7	Jean Lapierre, Liberal
2006 federal	Outremont	Independent	85	0.21	9/11	Jean Lapierre, Liberal

=== Outremont: Xavier Rochon ===
Xavier Rochon was born in October 1983 in Longueuil. He has sought election to the National Assembly of Quebec and the House of Commons of Canada; in 2006, he was a student at the Université de Montréal. He later worked as a teacher.

Electoral record
Election	Division	Party	Votes	%	Place	Winner
2003 provincial	Taillon	Independent	216	0.56	6/6	Pauline Marois, Parti Québécois
2006 federal	Outremont	Independent	34	0.08	10/11	Jean Lapierre, Liberal

== Ontario ==
=== Kingston and the Islands: Karl Eric Walker ===
Walker (born February 22, 1954, in Verona, Ontario) is a Civil Engineering graduate of St. Lawrence College in Kingston, and works as an inspector. He has campaigned for public office three times, and was 54 years old during the 2006 federal election (Kingston Whig-Standard, 11 January 2004).

He had previously campaigned as an independent candidate in the 1999 provincial election, in the neighbouring riding of Hastings—Frontenac—Lennox and Addington. He ran as a "non-politician" candidate, emphasized the importance of his family (KWS, 27 May 1999), and pledged to provide money for health and education following the cuts of the Mike Harris government (KWS, 6 May 1999). In 2004, he accused the Liberal government of misusing public funds (KWS, 26 June 2004) and called for the government to create more jobs in the environment sector (KWS, 22 June 2004).

After the 2004 election, an Elections Canada official revealed that Walker's nomination papers had been approved even though they were improperly filled out. He filed his forms thirty minutes before the nominations closed, and was later declared a candidate at Kingston's traditional public town meeting. Election officials did not notice the error until later (KWS, 4 January 2006).

During the 2006 campaign, he called for the federal and provincial governments to provide more relief for people on social assistance (KWS, 13 January 2006). He also criticized incumbent Liberal MP Peter Milliken, arguing that he was a good Speaker of the House of Commons of Canada but a poor representative for Kingston and area interests (KWS, 11 January 2006).

Electoral record
Election	Division	Party	Votes	%	Place	Winner
1999 provincial	Hastings—Frontenac—Lennox and Addington	Independent	200		7/7	Leona Dombrowsky, Liberal
2004 federal	Kingston and the Islands	Independent	100	0.18	8/8	Peter Milliken, Liberal
2006 federal	Kingston and the Islands	Independent	296	0.48	5/6	Peter Milliken, Liberal

=== Peterborough: Bob Bowers ===
Bob Bowers was born on October 28, 1947, in Peterborough. He has a Bachelor of Arts from the University of Western Ontario and later attended Teacher's College, but he was unable to graduate due to health issues. He was convicted of robbery in his twenties and spent two years at a penitentiary in Kingston, though he maintains his innocence in the matter. His biography indicates that he has worked as a farmer, as a bartender, as a mail service worker, and in construction.

Bowers is a frequent candidate for public office in Peterborough. In 2000, he called for referendums on all major public issues. During the 2003 election, he supported increases to disability allowance and the provincial minimum wage. He unsuccessfully sought the New Democratic Party nomination for the 1997 federal election, and, in 2003, he acknowledged that he could not win and asked his supporters to vote for provincial NDP candidate Dave Nickle.

An activist for the rights of the disabled, Bowers has openly acknowledged that he has schizophrenia. He frequently picketed the Peterborough branch of the Canadian Mental Health Association in the mid-2000s (decade), accusing it of discrimination and non-accountability. As of 2010, the Ontario Human Rights Commission is reviewing his complaint against a local café.

Electoral record
Election	Division	Party	Votes	%	Place	Winner
1999 provincial	Peterborough	Independent	151	0.28	5/7	Gary Stewart, Progressive Conservative
2000 federal	Peterborough	Independent	147	0.28	6/6	Peter Adams, Liberal
2003 provincial	Peterborough	Independent	178	0.32	6/6	Jeff Leal, Liberal
2006 federal	Peterborough	Independent	179	0.28	6/6	Dean Del Mastro, Conservative

=== Renfrew—Nipissing—Pembroke: Paul Kelly ===
Paul Kelly (born 1963 in Renfrew County) was awarded a BA in political science from Dalhousie University in the 1980s. He worked as director of development for the Pembroke General Hospital Foundation as well as serving as an assistant to provincial cabinet ministers from 1995 to 2002.

=== Scarborough—Rouge River: Yaqoob Khan ===
Dr. Yaqoob Khan was born in India, and practiced medicine in Somalia, Peru and Guyana before moving to Canada. He taught in elementary schools for twenty-two years, retiring around 1990. A community activist, he is an advocate for youth and seniors' issues and a supporter of community policing. He has been president and chief executive officer of the Canadian Institute of Islamic Studies for many years, and has advised the federal and provincial governments on race relations.

He helped organize a 1984 meeting of Muslim and Sikh groups in Toronto to protest the policies of Indira Gandhi's government in India. Khan was quick to condemn the September 11, 2001, terrorist attacks in New York City and Washington, describing them as "a tragedy that has no parallel" and saying "I can't imagine anyone this merciless".

Khan has campaigned several times for municipal office in Toronto. The 2006 election was his first federal campaign. His slogan was, "It's not about being different, it's about making a difference".

Electoral record
Election	Division	Party	Votes	%	Place	Winner
1988 municipal	Metro Toronto Council, Scarborough-Malvern	n/a	1,473		3/5	Robert Sanders
1990 municipal by-election	Toronto Board of Education, Ward Four	n/a	not listed		not listed	Fiona Chapman
1991 municipal	Metro Toronto Council, High Park	n/a	1,544	6.62	3/3	Derwyn Shea
1994 municipal	Metro Toronto Council, Scarborough-Malvern	n/a	1,807		3/3	Raymond Cho
2000 municipal	Toronto Board of Education, Ward Seven	n/a	1,415		3/4	Irene Atkinson
2003 municipal	Toronto Board of Education, Ward Twenty-One	n/a	4,938		2/3	Noah Ng
2006 municipal	Toronto City Council, Ward 28 Toronto Centre	n/a	731	5.4	4/7	Pam McConnell
2006 federal	Scarborough—Rouge River	Independent	467		5/6	Derek Lee, Liberal

The 1991 results are taken from a Toronto Star newspaper report on November 13, 1991, with 192 of 196 polls reporting.

=== Scarborough Southwest: Trevor Sutton ===
Sutton was born on February 11, 1972, in Toronto. He has a high school diploma, and listed himself as a hotel worker. It is not clear what ideology he represented in the campaign. He received 147 votes (0.35%), finishing fifth against Liberal incumbent Tom Wappel.

=== Sudbury: David Popescu ===
J. David Popescu received 54 votes (0.11%), finishing eighth against Liberal incumbent Diane Marleau.

=== Wellington—Halton Hills: Michael Wisniewski ===
Wisniewski (born September 10, 1984), nicknamed "The Wizard", was twenty-one years old at the time of the election. He had graduated from high school the year before and worked part-time at a local Zehrs supermarket.

Although his personal views are close to that of Libertarianism, Wisniewski claimed to have no platform, but rather felt that a Member of Parliament should represent the citizens directly. He proposed the idea that, should he be elected, he would hold regular town meetings to discuss issues concerning the community. He believes the party system should be secondary to representative democracy, and rigorously promoted a higher voter turnout.

Wisniewski received 355 votes (0.64%), finishing sixth against incumbent Conservative candidate Michael Chong.

Later in 2006, Mike ran for the position of town councillor in the Township of Centre Wellington's Ward 1. He finished third behind former councillor Shawn Watters and Liberal party insider Ed Smith.

Links:

- The Wizard's wheel appeal - Guelph Mercury article
- Courting voters in Wellington-Halton Hills - Mike Wisniewski - Guelph Mercury article

=== Windsor West: Habib Zaidi ===
Zaidi (born November 1956 in Lahore, Pakistan) is a businessman in the trucking industry. According to an interview with Alex Vernon of the Campaign Life Coalition, he is a longtime Liberal who campaigned as an independent to protest the party's support for same-sex marriage. He is also anti-abortion. He received 224 votes (0.47%), finishing sixth against New Democratic Party incumbent Brian Masse.

=== York West: Axcel Cocon ===
Cocon was born on January 17, 1951, in Guatemala. According to his 2006 campaign biography, he worked as a journalist, practiced law after receiving a degree from the Universidad de San Carlos, and was a diplomatic ambassador to the United Nations. He contends that he was forced to leave Guatemala after writing a story critical of the army. Cocon is a founding member of the Latin American Fraternity in Windsor, and a Board Member of the Centre for Spanish Speaking People in Toronto.

Cocon ran for Mayor of Toronto in 2003, calling for an ombudsman to settle disputes between voters and the municipal bureaucracy. He was a last-minute entry to the 2006 federal election. A Toronto Star report indicates that he stormed out of a debate at York University following a disagreement with the moderator.

Cocon applied for a temporary appointment to Toronto's 30th and 35th Council Wards on separate occasions in 2006, following the resignation of the previous office-holders (both vacancies were filled by a vote of city councillors). He did not receive any votes on either occasion. He ran for a seat in the 35th ward in the 2006 municipal elections, and finished last in a field of thirteen candidates. He repeated his call for a municipal ombudsman, and urged the city to provide free transportation and lunches for students.

Electoral record
Election	Division	Party	Votes	%	Place	Winner
2003 municipal	Mayor of Toronto	n/a	498	0.07	27/44	David Miller
2006 federal	York West	Independent	192	0.57	5/5	Judy Sgro, Ontario
2006 municipal	Toronto City Council, Ward 35	n/a	30	0.2	13/13	Adrian Heaps

== Manitoba ==
=== Churchill: Brad Bodnar ===
Bodnar was born in September 1964. He holds a high school diploma from Margaret Barbour Collegiate Institute, has taken a residential electrical course at Keewatin Community College, and is a graduate from Vancouver Film School in computer animation. Although he has management experience, taught martial arts, and worked in various trades, he describes himself as an artist.

During the 2006 election, a writer identifying himself as Brad Bodnar posted several comments to a CBC discussion board on the Churchill riding. He described his campaign as being focused on equality and accountability issues. Bodnar currently represents his community of The Pas as a town councillor. Bodnar received 146 votes (0.58%), finishing sixth against Liberal candidate Tina Keeper.
