= Herbert John Mackie =

Canadian politician

Herbert John Mackie (January 8, 1876 – January 1, 1947) was a lumber merchant and political figure in Ontario, Canada. He represented Renfrew North in the House of Commons of Canada from 1917 to 1921 as a Unionist Party member.

He was born in Pembroke, Ontario, the son of Thomas Mackie and Jessie Shaw, and was educated there. He married Delia Elizabeth Shannon in 1908. Mackie served in the Boer War and was lieutenant-colonel for the local militia from 1906 to 1908. Mackie died in Ottawa at the age of 70.
