= James Findlay (MP) =

Canadian politician

James Findlay (May 16, 1833 – July 23, 1923) was an Ontario newspaper owner and political figure. He represented Renfrew North in the House of Commons of Canada as a Liberal member from 1873 to 1874.

He was born in Châteauguay in Lower Canada in 1833, the son of Robert Findlay, a Scottish immigrant. He was owner and editor of the Pembroke Observer. Findlay was an unsuccessful candidate for a seat in the House of Commons in an 1869 by-election. He was defeated when he ran for reelection in 1878 and 1887. Findlay died in Pembroke at the age of 90.
