= John Thurston =

John Thurston may refer to:

== Politicians ==
- John Bates Thurston (1836–1897), independent Premier, and later British colonial Governor, of Fiji, 1888–97
- John Mellen Thurston (1847–1916), Republican United States Senator from Nebraska
- John Jabez Thurston (1888–1960), independent member of the Canadian House of Commons
- John Thurston (Arkansas politician) (born 1972), Republican Arkansas State Treasurer, 2025–present

== Sports ==
- John Thurston (basketball) (born 1948), US collegiate women's basketball coach
- Mel Thurston (1919–1997), born John Thurston, American professional basketball player

== Other ==
- John Thurston (artist) (1774–1822), British wood-engraver and illustrator
- John Thurston (inventor) (fl. 1799–1850s), British furniture maker and the inventor of slate beds and rubber cushions for billiard tables
