= Victoria (Ontario electoral district) =

Former federal electoral district in Ontario, Canada

Ontario electoral district

Defunct federal electoral district
- Legislature: House of Commons
- District created: 1903
- District abolished: 1966
- First contested: 1904
- Last contested: 1965

Victoria was a federal electoral district represented in the House of Commons of Canada from 1904 to 1968. It was located in the province of Ontario. This riding was first created in 1903 from parts of Peterborough East, Victoria North and Victoria South ridings.

It was initially defined as consisting of the county of Victoria, and the provisional county of Haliburton. In 1947, it was expanded to include the townships of Rama, Mara, Thorah and Brock in the county of Ontario.

The electoral district was abolished in 1966 when it became part of Victoria—Haliburton riding.

== Members of Parliament ==
This riding elected the following members of the House of Commons of Canada:

Parliament	Years	Member	Party
Riding created from Victoria North, Victoria South and Peterborough East
10th	1904–1908	Sam Hughes	Liberal–Conservative
11th	1908–1911	Sam Hughes	Liberal–Conservative
12th	1911–1911	Sam Hughes	Liberal–Conservative
12th	1911–1917	Sam Hughes	Liberal–Conservative
13th	1917–1921	Sam Hughes	Government (Unionist)
14th	1921–1925	John Jabez Thurston	Independent
15th	1925–1926	Thomas Hubert Stinson	Conservative
16th	1926–1930	Thomas Hubert Stinson	Conservative
17th	1930–1935	Thomas Hubert Stinson	Conservative
18th	1935–1940	Bruce McNevin	Liberal
19th	1940–1945	Bruce McNevin	Liberal
20th	1945–1949	Clayton Hodgson	Progressive Conservative
21st	1949–1953	Clayton Hodgson	Progressive Conservative
22nd	1953–1957	Clayton Hodgson	Progressive Conservative
23rd	1957–1958	Clayton Hodgson	Progressive Conservative
24th	1958–1962	Clayton Hodgson	Progressive Conservative
25th	1962–1963	Clayton Hodgson	Progressive Conservative
26th	1963–1965	Charles Lamb	Progressive Conservative
27th	1965–1968	William C. Scott	Progressive Conservative
Riding dissolved into Victoria—Haliburton

== Election history ==
1904 Canadian federal election: Victoria
Party	Candidate	Votes	%	±%
Liberal–Conservative	Sam Hughes	4,085		
Unknown	R. J. McLaughlin	3,782		

1908 Canadian federal election: Victoria
Party	Candidate	Votes	%	±%
Liberal–Conservative	Sam Hughes	4,315		
Unknown	Archibald Wilson	3,277		

1911 Canadian federal election: Victoria
Party	Candidate	Votes	%	±%
Liberal–Conservative	Sam Hughes	4,001		
Unknown	James Burnett Begg	2,707		

By-election: On Mr. Hughes being appointed Minister of the Militia and Defence, 27 October 1911: Victoria
Party	Candidate	Votes	%	±%
Liberal–Conservative	Sam Hughes	acclaimed		

1917 Canadian federal election: Victoria
Party	Candidate	Votes	%	±%
Government (Unionist)	Sam Hughes	6,338		
Opposition (Laurier Liberals)	George Dunkley Isaac	3,079		

1921 Canadian federal election: Victoria
Party	Candidate	Votes	%	±%
Independent	John Jabez Thurston	8,019		
Conservative	Thomas Hubert Stinson	7,816		

1925 Canadian federal election: Victoria
Party	Candidate	Votes	%	±%
Conservative	Thomas Hubert Stinson	8,632		
Progressive	Bruce McNiven	6,285		

1926 Canadian federal election: Victoria
Party	Candidate	Votes	%	±%
Conservative	Thomas Hubert Stinson	9,070		
Progressive	John Jabez Thurston	6,004		

1930 Canadian federal election: Victoria
Party	Candidate	Votes	%	±%
Conservative	Thomas Hubert Stinson	8,999		
Liberal	Thomas John Carley	6,269		

1935 Canadian federal election: Victoria
Party	Candidate	Votes	%	±%
Liberal	Bruce McNevin	8,234		
Conservative	Thomas Hubert Stinson	8,174		
Reconstruction	John R. Falconer	558		

1940 Canadian federal election: Victoria
Party	Candidate	Votes	%	±%
Liberal	Bruce McNevin	8,499		
National Government	C. D. H. MacAlpine	7,422		

1945 Canadian federal election: Victoria
Party	Candidate	Votes	%	±%
Progressive Conservative	Clayton Hodgson	8,207		
Liberal	Bruce McNevin	7,388		
Co-operative Commonwealth	Allan Wilson Botting	601		

1949 Canadian federal election: Victoria
Party	Candidate	Votes	%	±%
Progressive Conservative	Clayton Hodgson	11,061		
Liberal	Bruce McNevin	10,105		
Co-operative Commonwealth	Gordon Balfour Milling	625		

1953 Canadian federal election: Victoria
Party	Candidate	Votes	%	±%
Progressive Conservative	Clayton Hodgson	12,634		
Liberal	Foster M. Graham	9,041		

1957 Canadian federal election: Victoria
Party	Candidate	Votes	%	±%
Progressive Conservative	Clayton Hodgson	14,153		
Liberal	Frank Welch	5,835		
Social Credit	Albert G. McPhail	917		
Co-operative Commonwealth	George Albert Constable	860		

1958 Canadian federal election: Victoria
Party	Candidate	Votes	%	±%
Progressive Conservative	Clayton Hodgson	16,080		
Liberal	Joseph A. Hutton	5,190		
Co-operative Commonwealth	George Constable	1,112		

1962 Canadian federal election: Victoria
Party	Candidate	Votes	%	±%
Progressive Conservative	Clayton Hodgson	12,555		
Liberal	Frank Welch	6,653		
New Democratic	Allan Gordon McPhail	3,029		
Social Credit	A. E. Hancock	742		

1963 Canadian federal election: Victoria
Party	Candidate	Votes	%	±%
Progressive Conservative	Charles Lamb	10,538		
Liberal	S. Clifton Benson	9,572		
New Democratic	Allan Gordon McPhail	2,994		

1965 Canadian federal election: Victoria
Party	Candidate	Votes	%	±%
Progressive Conservative	William C. Scott	11,282		
Liberal	Hugh David Petrie Logan	8,828		
New Democratic	Allan Gordon McPhail	3,230		

== See also ==
- List of Canadian electoral districts
- Historical federal electoral districts of Canada
