= James Maclennan =

Canadian politician

The Honourable James Maclennan
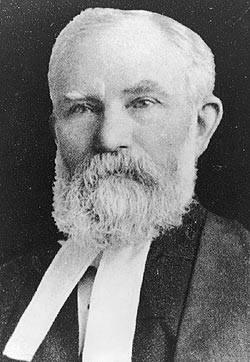

Puisne Justice of the Supreme Court of Canada
- In office October 5, 1905 – February 13, 1909
- Nominated by: Wilfrid Laurier
- Preceded by: Wallace Nesbitt
- Succeeded by: Francis Alexander Anglin

Member of the Canadian Parliament for Victoria North
- In office 1874–1875
- Preceded by: Joseph Staples
- Succeeded by: Hector Cameron

Personal details
- Born: March 17, 1833 Lancaster, Upper Canada
- Died: June 9, 1915 (aged 82) Toronto, Ontario
- Party: Liberal
- Education: Queen's University
- Profession: Lawyer

James Maclennan (March 17, 1833 – June 9, 1915) was a Canadian lawyer, politician, and Puisne judge of the Supreme Court of Canada.

Born in the township of Lancaster, Upper Canada (now Ontario), the son of Roderick Maclennan and Mary Macpherson, he received a Bachelor of Arts from Queen's University in 1849. He studied to be a lawyer and was called to the bar in 1857. He practised law with Oliver Mowat in Toronto until 1888, when he was appointed to the Ontario Court of Appeal. He was the editor of The Ontario Judicature Act, 1881 (1884)

Maclennan ran unsuccessfully for a seat in the Ontario assembly in 1871. In the 1874 federal election, he was elected to the House of Commons of Canada in the riding of Victoria North. However, the election was declared void. He won the by-election in 1874 but again the election was declared void. In 1905, he was appointed to the Supreme Court of Canada and retired in 1909.

Maclennan was married twice: to Elizabeth McGill in 1862 and to Mary L. Strange in 1909, possibly children, but none surviving him.
