= Victoria North (federal electoral district) =

Former federal electoral district in Ontario, Canada

Victoria North was a federal electoral district represented in the House of Commons of Canada from 1867 to 1904. It was located in the province of Ontario. It was created by the British North America Act 1867, which divided the County of Victoria divided into two ridings: the South and North Ridings.

The North Riding initially consisted of the Townships of Anson, Bexley, Carden, Dalton, Digby, Eldon, Fenelon, Hindon, Laxton, Lutterworth, Macaulay and Drapper, Sommerville, and Morrison, Muskoka, Monck and Watt (taken from the County of Simcoe), and any other surveyed townships lying to the north of the North Riding.

In 1872, it was redefined to exclude townships included in the electoral district of Muskoka. In 1882, it was redefined to consist of the townships of Eldon, Fenelon, Somerville, Carden, Dalton, Bexley, Laxton, Digby, Longford, Lutterworth, Anson, Hindon, Galway, Snowdon, Minden, Stanhope, Sherbourne and McClintock, and the village of Fenelon Falls.

The electoral district was abolished in 1903 when it was amalgamated into Victoria electoral district.

== Electoral history ==
1867 Canadian federal election
Party	Candidate	Votes	%	±%
Liberal	John Morison	687		
Unknown	Hector Cameron	403		

1872 Canadian federal election
Party	Candidate	Votes
Conservative	Joseph Staples	629
Liberal	John Morison	541
Source: Canadian Elections Database

1874 Canadian federal election
Party	Candidate	Votes	%	±%
Liberal	James Maclennan	564		
Conservative	Hector Cameron	560		
Source: lop.parl.ca

By-election: On election being declared void, 22 December 1874: Victoria North
Party	Candidate	Votes	%	±%
Liberal	James Maclennan	604		
Conservative	Hector Cameron	601		

This by-election was declared void, and Mr. Cameron was declared elected on 17 September 1875.

1878 Canadian federal election
Party	Candidate	Votes	%	±%
Conservative	Hector Cameron	917		
Liberal	James Maclennan	741		

1882 Canadian federal election
Party	Candidate	Votes	%	±%
Conservative	Hector Cameron	1,063		
Unknown	G.G. Keith	773		

1887 Canadian federal election
Party	Candidate	Votes	%	±%
Liberal	John Augustus Barron	1,442		
Conservative	Hector Cameron	1,141		

1891 Canadian federal election
Party	Candidate	Votes	%	±%
Liberal	John Augustus Barron	1,614	53.34	
Liberal-Conservative	Sam Hughes	1,412	46.66	

By-election: On Mr. Barron being unseated on petition, 11 February 1892: Victoria North
Party	Candidate	Votes	%	±%
Liberal-Conservative	Samuel Hughes	elected		
Liberal	John Augustus Barron			

1896 Canadian federal election
Party	Candidate	Votes	%	±%
Liberal-Conservative	Samuel Hughes	1,715		
Liberal	R.J. McLaughlin	1,464		
McCarthyite	J.H. Delemere	338		

1900 Canadian federal election
Party	Candidate	Votes	%	±%
Liberal-Conservative	Samuel Hughes	1,546		
Liberal	John McKay	1,417		

== See also ==
- List of Canadian electoral districts
- Historical federal electoral districts of Canada
