= Thomas Hubert Stinson =

Canadian politician

Member of Parliament for Victoria, Ontario
- In office October 1925 – October 1935
- Preceded by: John Jabez Thurston
- Succeeded by: Bruce McNevin

Personal details
- Born: Thomas Hubert Stinson; 26 February 1883 Minden, Ontario, Canada
- Died: 29 January 1965 (aged 81)
- Party: Conservative
- Spouse(s): Ella E. Robson m. 14 July 1910
- Profession: barrister

Thomas Hubert Stinson (26 February 1883 – 29 January 1965) was a Conservative member of the House of Commons of Canada and a barrister. He was born in Minden, Ontario.

Stinson attended public school at Minden, Ontario, then secondary school at Lindsay Collegiate Institute. He proceeded to the University of Toronto and Osgoode Hall Law School. He became a director of the Victoria Trust and Savings Company at Lindsay. From 1913 to 1921, he served as crown attorney for Victoria-Haliburton and was made King's Counsel in 1921. At one time, he was the solicitor for Victoria County, Haliburton County and the town of Lindsay.

He was first elected to Parliament to represent the Victoria, Ontario riding in the 1925 general election, after an unsuccessful campaign there in 1921. Stinson was re-elected there in the 1926 and 1930 elections, but was defeated by Bruce McNevin of the Liberal party in the 1935 election.
