= Wallace Nesbitt =

Wallace Nesbitt K.C.
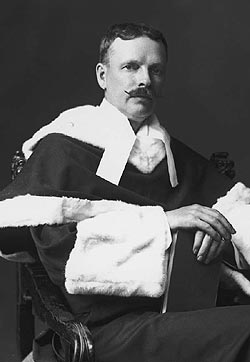

Puisne Justice of the Supreme Court of Canada
- In office May 16, 1903 – October 4, 1905
- Nominated by: Wilfrid Laurier
- Preceded by: David Mills
- Succeeded by: James Maclennan

3rd President of the Canadian Bar Association
- In office 1928–1929
- Preceded by: J.E. Martin
- Succeeded by: Richard B. Bennett

5th President of the Ontario Bar Association
- In office 1923–1927
- Preceded by: George P. Henderson, K.C.
- Succeeded by: Newton W. Rowell, K.C.

Personal details
- Born: May 13, 1858 Woodstock, Canada West
- Died: April 7, 1930 (aged 71) Toronto, Ontario, Canada
- Education: Osgoode Hall

Wallace Nesbitt, KC (May 13, 1858 – April 7, 1930) was a Canadian lawyer and puisne justice of the Supreme Court of Canada.

Born in Woodstock, Canada West (now Ontario), the son of John W. Nesbitt and Mary Wallace, he was called to the Ontario Bar in 1881. A practising lawyer, he was appointed to the Supreme Court of Canada in 1903. He served for two years until he resigned in 1905.

Nesbitt served as the president of the Ontario Bar Association from 1923 to 1927, and as national president of the Canadian Bar Association from 1928 to 1929.

== Family ==
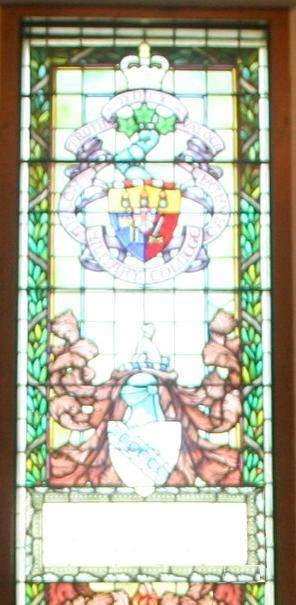
Memorial Stained Glass Window, Douglass Burr Plumb, Memorial Stairwell, Mackenzie Building, Royal Military College of Canada

In 1887, Wallace Nesbitt married Louisa Andrée Plumb née Elliott (d. 1894), the widow of his one-time law partner Thomas Street Plumb (d. 1885), and became the stepfather of two young children. In memory of his stepson Gentleman Cadet Douglas Burr Plumb, who drowned at Romaine, Labrador on June 22, 1903, Wallace Nesbitt donated a stained glass memorial window in 1920 featuring a Royal Military College of Canada crest and motto.
