= John Augustus Barron =

Canadian politician and lawyer (1850–1936)

Member of the Canadian Parliament for Victoria North
- In office 1887–1892
- Preceded by: Hector Cameron
- Succeeded by: Sam Hughes

Personal details
- Born: July 11, 1850 Toronto, Canada West
- Died: January 8, 1936 (aged 85) Stratford, Ontario, Canada
- Party: Liberal
- Occupation: lawyer

John Augustus Barron (July 11, 1850 in Toronto, Canada West – January 8, 1936 in Stratford, Ontario) was a Canadian politician and lawyer. He was elected to the House of Commons of Canada in 1887 as Member of the Liberal Party in the riding of Victoria North. He was re-elected in 1891 but unseated by petition and lost in the riding by-election on February 11, 1892. Prior to his federal experience, he was reeve of Lindsay, Ontario for eight years. He also participated in the Fenian Raids between 1866 and 1871. He also authored numerous books.

In 1897, Barron was appointed judge of Perth County and served as county judge until his retirement in 1925. Barron died in Stratford, Ontario. He is buried at Avondale Cemetery in Stratford.

The geography Township of Barron in Nipissing District was named after him, which in turn gave its name to the Barron River.

== Ice hockey career ==
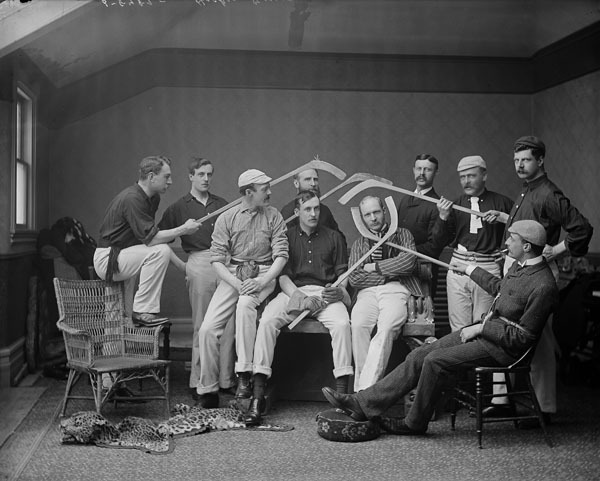
Barron, at centre right with the hockey sticks around his head, in 1889 with the Rideau Hall Rebels ice hockey team. James Creighton is seated third from left. Arthur Stanley is standing second from left and his brother Edward Stanley far right.

Barron was an early organizing of competitive ice hockey in Canada. While in Ottawa he was a member of the Rideau Hall Rebels ice hockey team (alongside James Creighton and Lord Frederick Stanleys two sons Arthur and Edward) which toured western Ontario and played exhibition games in order to stimulate interest in the game.

Between 1890 and 1891, during the first two years of the Ontario Hockey Association (OHA), Barron acted as a vice-president of the league. When the OHA was founded on November 27, 1890, at Queen's Hotel in Toronto Barron was chairman of the meeting.

John Barron's son Frederic "Fritz" Barron died while playing a game of ice hockey at the Auditorium Rink in Winnipeg with his Dominion Bank team on February 1, 1901. He was 22 years old. Fritz Barron, who was said to have had a weak heart, was allegedly hit by a puck in the solar plexus region and died not long after. His physician claimed cause of death was due to his weak heart condition coupled with too vigorous participation in the game.

== Electoral record ==
1887 Canadian federal election: Victoria North
| Party | Candidate | Votes | % | ±% |
|---|---|---|---|---|
| Liberal | John Augustus Barron | 1,442 | | |
| Conservative | Hector Cameron | 1,141 | | |

1891 Canadian federal election: Victoria North
| Party | Candidate | Votes | % | ±% |
|---|---|---|---|---|
| Liberal | John Augustus Barron | 1,614 | 53.34 | |
| Liberal-Conservative | Sam Hughes | 1,412 | 46.66 | |
