= Clayton Hodgson =

Canadian politician

Clayton Wesley Hodgson

Member of Parliament for Victoria
- In office June 1945 – February 1963
- Preceded by: Bruce McNevin
- Succeeded by: Charles Lamb

Personal details
- Born: 20 March 1897 Burnt River, Ontario
- Died: 14 April 1970 (aged 73) Haliburton, Ontario
- Party: Progressive Conservative
- Spouse: Phyllis Dart
- Profession: lumber merchant

Clayton Wesley Hodgson (20 March 1897 – 14 April 1970) was a Progressive Conservative party member of the House of Commons of Canada. He was born in Burnt River, Ontario and became a lumber merchant by career.

He was first elected at the Victoria riding in the 1945 general election then re-elected there for successive terms in the 1949, 1953, 1957, 1958 and 1962 federal elections.

From August 1957 to February 1958, he was Parliamentary Assistant to the Minister of Public Works then from November 1959 to November 1961, he served as Parliamentary Secretary to the Minister of Transport.

Hodgson died at Haliburton, Ontario aged 73, leaving a wife, four sons and two daughters.
