= Hector Cameron (politician) =

Canadian politician

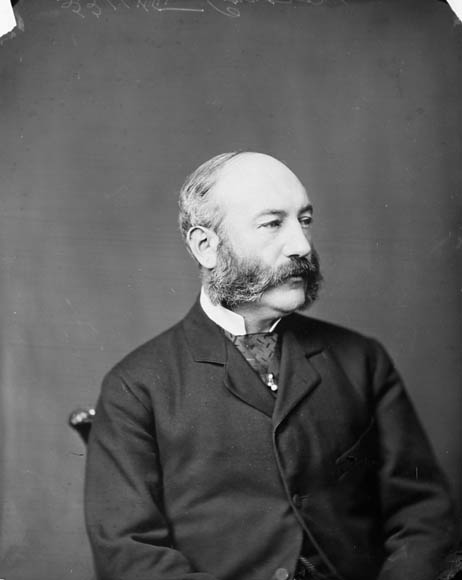
Hector Cameron Source: Library and Archives Canada

Hector Cameron, QC (June 3, 1832 – November 2, 1896) was a lawyer and political figure in Ontario, Canada. He represented Victoria North in the House of Commons of Canada from 1875 to 1887 as a Conservative member.

He was born in Montreal, the son of Kenneth Cameron and Christian Selby. Cameron was the nephew of John Cameron who had served in the assembly for the Province of Canada. He was educated at King's College London, Trinity College Dublin and the University of Toronto. Cameron was called to the bar in 1854. In 1860, he married Clara Boswell. In 1872, he was named Queen's Counsel. He practised law in Toronto. Cameron was an unsuccessful candidate for the House of Commons in 1867, 1872, 1874 and a subsequent by-election held in 1874. The election of James Maclennan in 1874 was overturned and Cameron was declared elected in 1875. He was elected again in 1878 and 1882 but defeated by John Augustus Barron when he ran for reelection in 1887. Cameron was a director of the Huron and Quebec Railway promoted by railway contractor John Fowler. He died in Cobourg at the age of 64.

== Electoral record ==
1867 Canadian federal election: Victoria North
Party	Candidate	Votes	%	±%
Liberal	John Morison	687		
Unknown	Hector Cameron	403		

1874 Canadian federal election: Victoria North
Party	Candidate	Votes	%	±%
Liberal	James Maclennan	564		
Conservative	Hector Cameron	560		
Source: lop.parl.ca

By-election: On election being declared void, 22 December 1874: Victoria North
Party	Candidate	Votes	%	±%
Liberal	James Maclennan	604		
Conservative	Hector Cameron	601		

This by-election was declared void, and Mr. Cameron was declared elected on 17 September 1875.

1878 Canadian federal election: Victoria North
Party	Candidate	Votes	%	±%
Conservative	Hector Cameron	917		
Liberal	James Maclennan	741		

1882 Canadian federal election: Victoria North
Party	Candidate	Votes	%	±%
Conservative	Hector Cameron	1,063		
Unknown	G.G. Keith	773		

1887 Canadian federal election: Victoria North
Party	Candidate	Votes	%	±%
Liberal	John Augustus Barron	1,442		
Conservative	Hector Cameron	1,141		
