= James Creighton (ice hockey) =

Canadian lawyer and athlete (1850–1930)

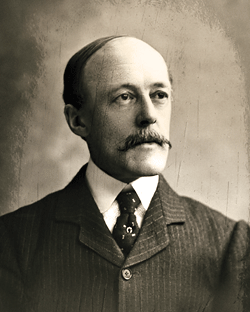
- Born: June 12, 1850; Halifax, Nova Scotia, British North America
- Died: June 27, 1930 (aged 80); Ottawa, Ontario, Canada
- Occupation: Law clerk
- Known for: Early ice hockey

James George Aylwin Creighton CMG KC (June 12, 1850 – June 27, 1930) was a Canadian lawyer, engineer, journalist and athlete. He is credited with organizing the first recorded indoor ice hockey match at Montreal, Quebec, Canada in 1875. He helped popularize the sport in Montreal and later in Ottawa, Ontario, Canada after he moved to Ottawa in 1882 where he served for 48 years as the law clerk to the Senate of Canada.

== Biography ==
Creighton was born in Halifax, Nova Scotia, the eldest son of William Hudson Creighton and Anna Fairbanks, grandson of James G. A. Creighton, founder of the James G. A. Creighton and Son ship chandling and wholesale food business. He was educated at Halifax Grammar School, where he graduated at age 14, then earned an arts degree with honours from University of King's College in 1868. He then studied under Sandford Fleming, who as engineer-in-chief for the Intercolonial Railway, hired him to work on surveys in Nova Scotia. Creighton moved to Montreal in 1872 and was employed as an engineer on the Lachine Canal, Montreal Harbour, and other public works. He was elected an associate of the Institution of Civil Engineers of Great Britain in 1876 and then attended McGill University, where he earned a bachelor's degree in common law, graduating with first class honours in 1880. On July 9, 1880, he was called to the Quebec bar, and two years later he became a partner in the firm of Barnard, Beauchamp, Creighton, and Doucet of Montreal.

From 1877 to 1881, Creighton was very involved in journalism, writing for The Montreal Gazette, Scribner's Magazine and various other publications. Creighton served as correspondent for The Gazette in the press gallery of the House of Commons of Canada. This experience and legal training led to his appointment on March 3, 1882, as law clerk to the Senate of Canada, a position he would hold for 48 years.

Creighton married Eleanor Platt of Montreal in 1878. Creighton was a member of the Rideau Club in Ottawa and captained their ice hockey team that opened the new Rideau Skating Rink in 1889. It was at the Rideau Club where Creighton suffered a fatal heart attack in 1930. At his funeral, Canadian Prime Minister Robert Borden was one of the mourners. His wife Eleanor died not long afterwards. Creighton and Platt were interred at Ottawa's Beechwood Cemetery. For many years, the grave was left unmarked. The couple had no children, which may be why there was no monument erected on the grave.

== Role in ice hockey development ==
Creighton is considered the "father of ice hockey," although he never claimed that honour. After moving to Montreal from Halifax to study and to work in engineering, Creighton sometimes acted as a figure skating judge at the Victoria Skating Club's Victoria Skating Rink. As a member of the club, he organized early morning sessions of informal hockey at the rink with his friends from McGill University and members of the club. It was here that Creighton captained one of the two teams that participated in the first recorded indoor game of organized ice hockey on March 3, 1875. His nine-man team won two "games" (goals) to one over the opposition led by Charles Torrance. According to teammate Henry Joseph, Creighton also organized the game. "It was this exhibition which aroused city-wide interest and gave rise to the formation of other ice hockey teams and to the rapid development of the game," McGill's physical education director Emanuel M. Orlick would write in The Gazette in 1943. In 1877, Creighton became the captain of the first known organized ice hockey team, the McGill University Hockey Club.

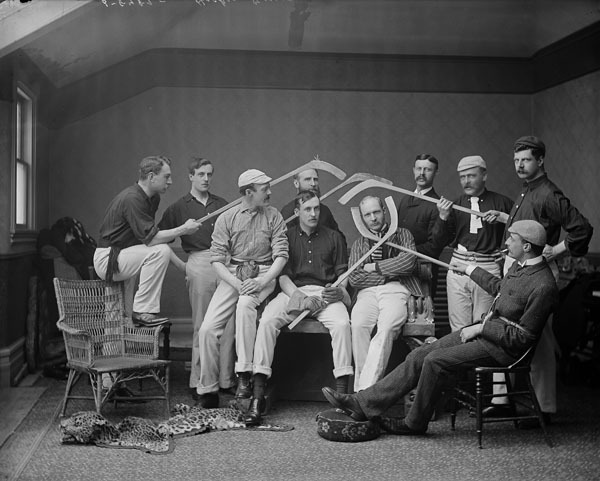
Rideau Hall Rebels in 1889. Creighton is seated third from left.

Creighton had played sports during his boyhood in Halifax, where a free-wheeling, stick-ball game called "ricket", "shinny" or occasionally "hockey", was played on ice outdoors with any number of players. It is believed that Creighton developed rules for the organized indoor game from the style of play of those games in Halifax, where (according to some historians) they had developed out of a Scottish game called shinty. However, ice hockey also has its roots in the aboriginal game of lacrosse, the English game of field hockey, the Irish game of hurling and the northern European game of bandy. Creighton is thought to be the person responsible for publishing the first rules for ice hockey in the February 27, 1877 edition of The Gazette (although the rules were virtually identical to previously published field hockey rules).

While living and working in Ottawa, Creighton continued his interest in ice hockey and joined with young parliamentarians and government 'aides de camp' to form a team called the Rideau Hall Rebels, after the residence of the Governor General of Canada, in Ottawa. That team played games in and around Ottawa and became well known. Creighton befriended teammates Edward and Arthur Stanley, sons of then Canadian Governor General Lord Stanley, as well as Judge John Augustus Barron (later a forming member of the OHA). In 1892, Lord Stanley presented a trophy – the Dominion Hockey Challenge Cup, known today as the Stanley Cup – to designate the amateur ice hockey championship of Canada.

== Honours ==
Creighton was appointed CMG in the 1913 Birthday Honours.

Creighton was inducted into the Nova Scotia Sport Hall of Fame in 1993 as the "father of organized hockey."

On May 22, 2008, Creighton was honored with a plaque at Centre Bell in Montreal, Quebec, the home rink of the Montreal Canadiens. The plaque was unveiled by Canadian Prime Minister Stephen Harper. Centre Bell is located near the site of the old Victoria Skating Rink.

The Society for International Hockey Research mounted a public campaign during 2008 and 2009 to erect a monument on Creighton's grave site. Contributors included members of the Society, Beechwood Cemetery, and the public. Notable donors included the crew of HMCS Vancouver, Ottawa Senators owner Eugene Melnyk and Calgary Flames owner Harley Hotchkiss. A gravestone and biographical plaque were unveiled at the cemetery in a ceremony on October 24, 2009. Canadian prime minister Stephen Harper was in attendance.

In 2015, Creighton was awarded the Order of Sport, marking his induction into Canada's Sports Hall of Fame.
