= John Morison (Canadian politician) =

Canadian politician

John Morison (September 9, 1818 – December 5, 1873) was an Ontario businessman and political figure. He represented Victoria North in the 1st Canadian Parliament as a Liberal member.

He was born in Greenock, Scotland in the year 1818, as the son of Malcolm Morison, and was educated there. He settled in Woodville in 1849, where he entered business as a merchant. Morison married Agnes Smith. He served as reeve for Eldon Township and was postmaster of Woodville for sixteen years. Morison died in Eldon Township at the age of 55.

1867 Canadian federal election: Victoria North
Party	Candidate	Votes	%	±%
Liberal	John Morison	687		
Unknown	Hector Cameron	403		

1872 Canadian federal election: Victoria North
Party	Candidate	Votes
Conservative	Joseph Staples	629
Liberal	John Morison	541
Source: Canadian Elections Database
