= Mic-Mac hockey stick =

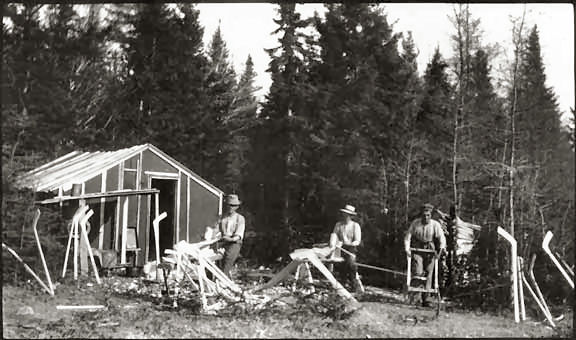
Mi'kmaq making hockey sticks from hornbeam trees (Carpinus caroliniana) in Nova Scotia about 1890.

The Mic-Mac hockey stick was made originally by the Mi'kmaq people of Nova Scotia, who dominated the international ice hockey market in the early twentieth century. It was first marketed by the Starr Manufacturing Company of Dartmouth, Nova Scotia, in the 1860s.

The Mi'kmaq practice of playing hockey appears in recorded colonial histories beginning in the 18th century, and beginning in the 19th century they were credited with inventing the ice hockey stick. The oldest known hockey stick, now owned by the Canadian Museum of History, dates to the mid-1830s and is made of sugar maple wood; it may have been made by a Mi'kmaq. (In 2006, a stick made by Mi'kmaq in the 1850s, at the time the oldest known, was sold at auction for $2.2 million; it had been appraised at US$4.25 million.

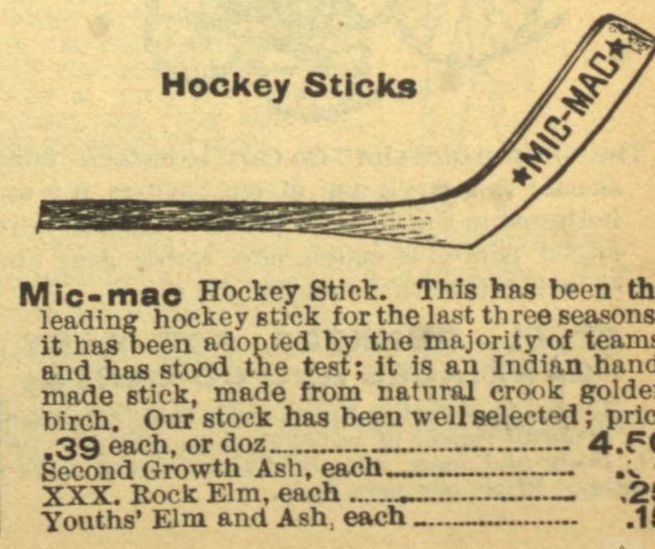
Mic Mac Hockey Stick in Eaton's catalogue, 1904

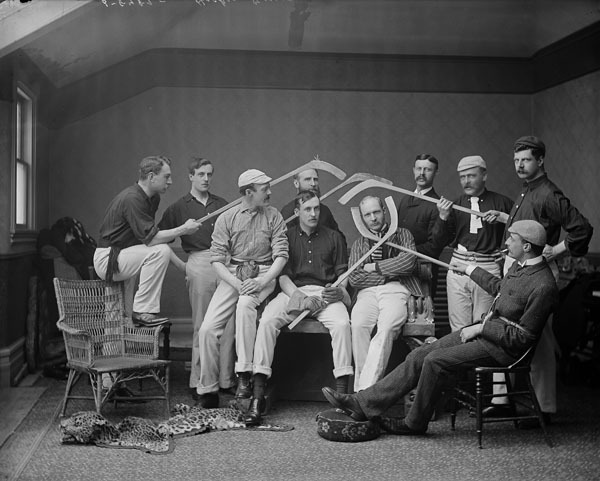
Sons of Lord Stanley and the Rideau Hall Rebels with Mic-Mac hockey sticks

In 1863, the Starr Manufacturing Company in Dartmouth, Nova Scotia, began to sell the Mic-Mac Hockey Stick nationally and internationally. Hockey became a popular sport in Canada in the 1890s, and through the first decade of the 20th century, the Mic-Mac was the best-selling hockey stick in Canada. By 1903, apart from farming, producing them was the primary occupation of the Mi'kmaq on reserves throughout Nova Scotia, particularly Shubenacadie, Indian Brook and Millbrook. In 1927 the department of Indian Affairs for Nova Scotia noted that the Mi'kmaq remained the "experts" at making hockey sticks. Mi'kmaq continued to make hockey sticks until the 1930s, when the product was industrialized.
