= Sam Hughes =

Canadian soldier and politician (1853–1921)

The Honourable Sir Sam Hughes PC KCB VD
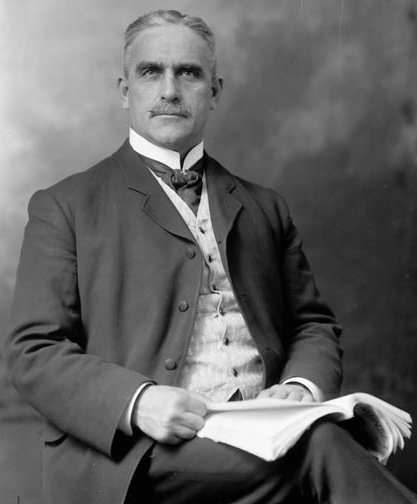
- Hughes in 1905

Minister of Militia and Defence
- In office 10 October 1911 – 12 October 1916
- Prime Minister: Robert Laird Borden
- Preceded by: Frederick William Borden
- Succeeded by: Albert Edward Kemp

Member of Parliament for Victoria North
- In office 11 February 1892 – 2 November 1904
- Preceded by: John Augustus Barron
- Succeeded by: none

Member of Parliament for Victoria
- In office 3 November 1904 – 24 August 1921
- Preceded by: none
- Succeeded by: John Jabez Thurston

Personal details
- Born: 8 January 1853 Solina, Darlington, Canada West
- Died: 24 August 1921 (aged 68) Lindsay, Ontario, Canada
- Party: Unionist
- Other political affiliations: Liberal-Conservative
- Spouse: Mary Burk
- Education: Toronto Normal School, University of Toronto
- Profession: Teacher, editor

Military service
- Allegiance: Canadian Militia
- Years of service: 1866–1916
- Rank: Bugler; Captain; Lieutenant Colonel; Honorary Lieutenant General
- Unit: 49th Hastings Battalion; 45th West Durham Battalion; Warren's Scouts
- Commands: 45th West Durham Battalion
- Battles/wars: Fenian Raids (1870); Second Boer War; Karoo Expedition; Battle of Faber's Put; First World War

Sir Samuel Hughes PC KCB VD (8 January 1853 – 23 August 1921) was a Canadian soldier and politician who served as Minister of Militia and Defence from 1911 to 1916. Responsible for Canada's armament during the first part of World War I, he was dismissed by Prime Minister Sir Robert Borden for insubordination in 1916.

== Early life ==
Hughes was born on 8 January 1853, at Solina near Bowmanville in what was then Canada West. He was a son of John Hughes from County Tyrone, Ireland, and Caroline (Laughlin) Hughes, a Canadian descended from Huguenots and Ulster Scots. He was educated in Durham County, Ontario and later attended the Toronto Normal School and the University of Toronto. In 1866 he joined the 45th West Durham Battalion of Infantry and served during the Fenian raids in the 1860s and 1870s. Throughout his life, Hughes was very involved in the militia, attending all of the drill practice sessions, and taking up shooting with a rifle in his spare time to improve his aim. A superb shot with a rifle, Hughes was active in gun clubs and ultimately became president of the Dominion Rifle Association. Hughes liked to see himself as embodying the Victorian values of hard work, self discipline, strength and manliness. Tall, muscular, and broad-shouldered, Hughes excelled at sports, being especially talented at lacrosse. He later claimed, in the British Who's Who, to have "personally offered to raise" Canadian contingents for service in "the Egyptian and Sudanese campaigns, the Afghan Frontier War, and the Transvaal War".

At the age of 20, he married his first wife, Caroline Preston, who died a year later. Subsequently, he married Mary Burk, and the new couple soon moved to Toronto. He was a teacher from 1875 to 1885 at the Toronto Collegiate Institute (now Jarvis Collegiate), where he was noted for his eccentricities such as his habit of chewing on his chalk when delivering his lectures. Hughes abandoned teaching as he had trouble supporting a wife and three children on his salary while teaching offered little prospect of promotion. In 1885, he moved his family to Lindsay, where he had bought The Victoria Warder, the local newspaper. He was the paper's publisher from 1885 to 1897.

== Newspaperman ==
In his first editorial, Hughes accused the Roman Catholic Church of being behind the smallpox epidemic that was ravaging Montreal at the time and called French-Canadians "little better than brutes". Shortly after he began his proprietorship of the Victoria Warder in July 1885, Hughes joined the local Liberal-Conservative Association. The Prime Minister, Sir John A. Macdonald, often commented that Hughes's letters to him were "voluminous" and sometimes "impertinent" as he demanded patronage jobs for local Tories. Macdonald also noted in 1888 that "Sam Hughes is one of our best friends", as the Victoria Warder very strongly supported the Conservatives, making him a useful man for the Tories in the rural Victoria County, where most people got their news from his newspaper.

At the time when Hughes arrived in Victoria County, it was a mostly forested area where lumbering was the chief industry, though agriculture was increasing as the trees were cut down. Most of the towns and villages in Victoria County were isolated settlements on lakeshores and connected only by water and by primitive roads. The population of the county was overwhelmingly of British descent and Protestant. On the masthead of the Victoria Warder, Hughes put the following poem: "A Union of hearts, a Union of hands, A Union no man can sever, A Union of tongues, A Union of lands, And the flag—British Union forever". Hughes had much affection for the rugged landscape of the Victoria County, talking about its forests and lakes in the same manner he praised the Highlands of Scotland and the rolling fields of Ulster. His grandson wrote that for Hughes Victoria County was his "spiritual home". Victoria County in the 19th century was considered to be a "rough" frontier area, and during his tempestuous time as editor, Hughes was sued for libel, there was an arson attempt against the Victoria Warder and at least one assassination was attempted against him when he was shot at while leaving his newspaper office.

In 1885, Hughes tried to volunteer for the expeditionary force sent to put down the North-West Rebellion led by the Métis Louis Riel, but he was refused despite being a very active member of the militia. Hughes's younger brother, James, was part of the force sent to the North-West Territories (modern Saskatchewan) and to compensate for being not able to fight, he gave the war extensive coverage in The Victoria Warder. Reflecting his life-long belief in the superiority of citizen soldiers over professional soldiers, Hughes presented the North-West Rebellion as a triumph of the Canadian militia, proudly trumpeting the fact that almost all of the men sent to the North-West had been civilians only weeks before donning their uniforms to head west. About the Canadian victory in the Battle of Batoche, Hughes wrote in an editorial that "regular troops were all right for police purposes in times of peace and for training schools, but beyond that they are an injury to the nation".

A recurring theme of Hughes's writing in the Victoria Warder was the fear that industrialization and urbanization might lead to a loss of masculinity, and that the best way to save traditional masculinity was compulsory militia service for all Canadian men. Hughes equated masculinity with toughness, and argued that militia service would toughen up Canadian men who might otherwise go soft living in an urban environment full of labor-saving devices. As one of his arguments for the militia, Hughes played a key role in creating what the Canadian historian Desmond Morton called the "militia myth" around the War of 1812; namely, he misrepresented Upper Canada as being saved from successive American invasions in 1812, 1813 and 1814 by the Upper Canada militia, instead of the British Army regulars, who in fact did most of the fighting.

Another theme of Hughes's coverage of the North-West Rebellion was the way in which he essentially agreed with Riel that the stream of English-speaking, Protestant settlers from Ontario into the Prairies were indeed threatening the existence of the Catholic religion and French language of the Métis, with the only difference that what Riel saw as a tragedy, Hughes saw as a blessing. Victoria County had as a percentage of the population the largest number of Orangemen in Canada in the late 19th century, and Hughes who sat on the executive board of the local Lodge of the Loyal Orange Order in the county was able to use the Orangemen to provide a reliable group of voters when seeking election to the House of Commons throughout his career. The combative Hughes enjoyed brawling with Irish Catholic immigrants on trips to Toronto. As the editor of the Victoria Warder, Hughes often attacked "Romanists" as he called Catholics. For an example in an editorial on 4 October 1889 he accused the "Romanists" of Lindsay of being "a disloyal murder-planning society". After Wilfrid Laurier, the new Liberal Leader of the Official Opposition, spoke in favour of free trade with the United States, Hughes accused him in an 1888 editorial of being in favour of having Canada annexed by the United States. To counter Laurier's argument that free trade with the United States meant prosperity, Hughes proposed an Imperial Federation with Great Britain as the best way to bring about prosperity, though he also held out the possibility that the United States might one day join to create a union of the English-speaking peoples.

== Member of Parliament ==
In the 1891 election, Hughes ran as a Conservative to represent Victoria North, but was narrowly defeated by only 202 votes by the Liberal incumbent, Jack Barron. Charging electoral fraud, Hughes went to court to challenge the result. Two justices at the Queen's Bench in Toronto ruled that the evidence of electoral fraud presented by Hughes was overwhelming, and ordered a by-election, held on 11 February 1892. During the by-election, Barron twice tried to bribe Hughes to drop out. Hughes was elected to Parliament in the by-election. In January 1894, Hughes was involved in a brawl on Lindsay's main street with a Roman Catholic blacksmith named Richard Kylie, which led him to being convicted of assault and fined $500. Despite expectations that the assault conviction would cause him to lose his seat, in the 1896 election, Hughes kept his seat.

In 1870, when the province of Manitoba was created out of the North-West Territories as part of the political deal to end the Red River Rebellion, Manitoba had a French-speaking Métis majority, and it was declared in the Manitoba Act creating the province that French was one of Manitoba's official languages, and the province was to provide Catholic education in French. By 1890, immigration from Ontario had changed the demographics of Manitoba drastically and in that year the Manitoba government passed a law making all education in English under the grounds that French-language education was costing too much money. This in turn led to demands for the Dominion government to intervene as this law violated the Manitoba Act. The Manitoba Schools Question proved to be one of the most bitterly divisive issues of the 1890s, and Hughes emerged as a spokesman for those who urged the Dominion government not to intervene, arguing that if Manitoba did not wish to provide education in French, that was its right. Hughes justified his views under the grounds of secularism, writing in 1892 "all churches are a simple damned nuisance". Despite his anti-Catholic stance, Hughes supported the claims of the Catholic John Thompson to be prime minister. Hughes's support for Thompson was based upon political expediency, namely that Thompson was the best man to beat the popular Wilfrid Laurier.

Hughes used his influence with the Orange Order to try to keep them from inflaming the Manitoba Schools Question, and to convince them to accept Thompson as the next Conservative leader to replace the ailing Sir John Abbott. As Thompson represented a more upper-class, urban wing of the Conservative Party, the support of Hughes who represented a more lower-class, rural wing of the Conservatives was instrumental in assuring Thompson became prime minister in November 1892 when Abbott finally resigned. He also tried to persuade the Orangemen to accept a Catholic prime minister. During Thompson's time as prime minister, Hughes supported his efforts to find a compromise to the Manitoba Schools Question, though he notably stopped writing as often to the prime minister after Thompson decided in 1894 to pass a remedial bill to force Manitoba to abide by the Manitoba Act. When Thompson died in December 1894, Hughes supported the candidacy of Sir Charles Tupper against Senator Mackenzie Bowell, but Bowell prevailed and became the next prime minister. As the debate intensified into a crisis in 1895–96 following a ruling by the Privy Council against Manitoba, Hughes took a generally moderate position on the Manitoba Schools Question, asking rhetorically in a letter to the editor of the Ottawa Journal "why should we plunge Canada into a religious war?" In a letter to Nathaniel Clarke Wallace, the Grand Master of the Orange Order, he advised against extremism on the Manitoba Schools Question, saying the issue was tearing the Conservative Party apart. Faced with certain defeat in the 1896 election, Hughes was one of the Conservative MPs who voted in March to depose Bowell in favour of Tupper.

Hughes supported Tupper's "friendly means" compromise of secular education in Manitoba with religious instruction after the school day had officially ended. Wallace disregarded Hughes's advice and in 1896 stated that the Orangemen would only support candidates who stood against the federal remedial bill against Manitoba, which in effect meant supporting the Liberals. Laurier, despite being a French-Canadian Catholic, supported Manitoba under the grounds of provincial rights, and had the Liberals filibuster Tupper's remedial bill. At a national meeting of the Orange Order in Collingwood in May 1896, Hughes spoke in favour of Tupper and was almost expelled from the Order. In the 1896 election, Hughes's main challenger was John Delemere, an independent candidate endorsed by Wallace. Hughes held on to his seat by arguing that the affairs of Manitoba were irrelevant to Victoria County and he understood local issues far better than his opponent. The election of 1896 resulted in a Liberal victory, and in the new, much smaller Conservative caucus, Hughes stood out as the few MPs whose reputation had been enhanced by the Manitoba Schools Question. Hughes's position on the Question was based upon pragmatism, namely the need to keep the Conservatives united to win the next general election in face of the challenge from Laurier, whose "sunny ways" were winning over people all over Canada. Unlike other Conservative MPs like George Foster who argued that the Manitoba Act had guaranteed the right to a Catholic education in French, and it was the duty of the Dominion government to uphold the law, Hughes had no interest in minority rights. Hughes felt that a secular education system was superior to a religious one, and that the language of instruction in Manitoba schools should be English. His moderate stance on the Manitoba Schools Question was motivated entirely by the fear that the issue might cause the Conservatives to lose the next general election, as indeed proved to be the case. Despite the fact that Wallace had campaigned against him, Hughes tried to rebuild the relationship between the Conservatives and the Orange Order, through it was not until Wallace died in 1901 that his efforts bore fruit.

The returned Prime Minister Laurier had declared his support for the British policies in South Africa, but was non-committal about sending Canadian troops if war should break out. In the summer of 1899, the Governor General of Canada, Lord Minto, and the commander of the Canadian Militia, Colonel Edward Hutton, drafted a secret plan for a Canadian contingent of 1,200 men to go to South Africa, and decided that Hughes as one of the most outspokenly imperialist members of Parliament was to be one of the commanders. In September 1899, Minto and Hutton first informed Frederick William Borden, the Minister of Militia and Defence, of the plan that they had drafted, though Laurier remained out of the loop. As Laurier continued to hesitate, Hughes offered to raise a regiment at his own expense to fight in South Africa, an offer which threatened to upset Hutton's plans as Hughes's offer gave Laurier the perfect excuse for doing nothing. When Hutton ordered Hughes as a subordinate militia officer to remain silent, Hughes responded with an angry outburst in public alleging an attempt by a British officer to silence a Canadian MP, creating what the Canadian historian Morton called a clash of "two like-minded, but out-sized egos".

== Boer War service ==
On 3 October 1899, the Transvaal Republic declared war on Great Britain. The Secretary of State for the Colonies, Joseph Chamberlain, sent Laurier a note thanking him for his offer of Canadian troops to South Africa, which confused the prime minister as he made no such offer. At the same time the October 1899 edition of the Canadian Military Gazette published the details of the plan to send 1,200 men to South Africa. When Laurier denied in the House of Commons having any plans to send troops, Chamberlain's note was leaked to the press, and on 9 October 1899, Laurier received a note from editor of the Toronto Globe (which supported the Liberals) saying the prime minister must "either send troops or get out of office". As the Liberal caucus was badly divided between anti-war French-Canadian MPs and pro-war English-Canadian MPs, Laurier did not dare summon Parliament for a vote as the Liberals might split over the issue, and instead issued an order-in-council on 14 October saying that Canada would provide a force of volunteers for South Africa. Hughes promptly volunteered for the contingent, but was vetoed by Hutton who had neither forgotten nor forgiven Hughes for his insubordination and his abrasive refusal to be silenced; however, perhaps as a form of revenge against Hutton, Laurier insisted that Hughes be allowed to go to South Africa.

Having convinced Laurier to send Canadian troops, Hughes embarked to serve in the Second Boer War. Upon boarding the ship SS Sardinian, which left Quebec City for Cape Town on 31 October 1899, carrying 1,061 Canadian volunteers, Hughes announced that he was "free of all military authority" and would take no orders from any officer. Upon arriving in South Africa, Hughes told the press that the Boers "on their old plugs of horses" would out-ride the British on the veld, a remark that marked the beginning of Hughes's stormy service in South Africa as ironically the ultra-imperialist Hughes constantly clashed with the British Army. Hughes developed a strong contempt for the British military while in South Africa and came away with the idea that frontier living had made the Canadians tougher and hardier soldiers than the British. The Canadian historian Pierre Berton wrote that Hughes "hated the British Army". Hughes always believed the part-time citizen soldiers of the Canadian militia were far better soldiers than the full-time professionals of the British Army, a viewpoint that did much to influence his later decisions in World War I. In this regard, the performance of the Boer kommandos (commandos) was used by Hughes to prove his point, as he argued that the citizen militias of the Transvaal and the Orange Free State had out-fought the British Army for much of the war, though he ignored the fact that in the end it was the British Army that won the war. Hughes also used the performance of irregular cavalry units from Canada and Australia to support his theory, noting that the "cowboy" units recruited from the Australian Outback and the Canadian Prairies were the ones most effective at hunting down the kommandos. Hughes's biographer, Ronald Haycock noted that he naively assumed that all future wars would be like the Boer War, even right down to being fought in a place like the veld. Haycock also noted that Hughes seemed to have no interest in understanding why the commandos had been defeated, instead presenting the war as almost a Boer victory. It was also during the Boer war that Hughes become convinced of the thesis that the Ross rifle developed by a Scottish sportsman, Sir Charles Ross, and manufactured in Canada was the ideal weapon for infantrymen. The more that the British Army rejected the Ross rifle as unsuitable, the more it persuaded Hughes of its superiority, though Morton noted that the British objections to the Ross rifle were sound as it was a hunting rifle that overheated after rapid firing and was too easily jammed by dirt.

However, despite his frequent clashes with British Army officers, Sir Alfred Milner, the British High Commissioner for South Africa, praised Hughes for his willingness to by-pass bureaucracy and to get things done. Two men who were later prominent in Milner's Kindergarten, William Hitchens and Lionel Curtis both served under Hughes's command from March 1900 onward as they advanced across the veld from the Cape Colony into the Orange Free State. Outside of Hughes's own accounts of his Boer War service, most of what is known about his time in South Africa comes from the accounts written by Hitchens, and Curtis and their mutual friend, Leo Amery, the war correspondent of The Times of London, who first met Hughes in Cape Town in December 1899 together with another mutual friend, Max Balfour. Amery, Balfour, Curtis and Hitchens all described Hughes as a populist leader who was not aloof from the common soldiers, impatient with bureaucracy, forthright about expressing his opinions about everything, and who shared the hardships on war on the veld. Balfour wrote that Hughes was chivalrous towards Boer civilians, apologizing to the wife of a man he arrested as a guerrilla for taking away her husband while Curtis stated that Hughes always paid for the food he had taken from farms out on the veld, saying he was no thief. Amery described Hughes as a hard-driving, aggressive commander whose cavalry covered vast distances across the veld, saying he was relentless in his pursuit of the enemy. In a promotion, in May 1900, Milner had Hughes made the intelligence officer and assistant adjutant general to Warren's Scouts commanded by Sir Charles Warren, which had the task of advancing over the Orange River to neutralize a Transvaal force under the command of Commandant-General Piet de Villers. During the advance, de Villers attacked the British camp at the Faber Pass outside of Campbell on 27 May 1900, and a half-dressed Hughes who sprung into action after waking up at the sound of the shooting, was involved in leading the counterattack that drove the Transvaalers back at the cost of 23 dead and 33 wounded. Afterwards, Hughes attacked Warren for "absolutely untrue" statements in his official report about the action at the Faber Pass such as his claim that he was not taken by surprise and the camp was well situated, criticism which Haycock described as very well merited.

Hughes would continually campaign, unsuccessfully, to be awarded a Victoria Cross (VC) for actions that he had supposedly taken in the fighting. The Canadian historian René Chartrand wrote that "...Hughes's character may be read from the fact that he had actually asked for the VC for his services in South Africa". Hughes's recommendation of himself for a VC was most unorthodox as normally one had to be recommended for the award. Hughes published most of his own accounts of the war, often saying that when he left, the British commander was "sobbing like a child." In fact, Hughes was dismissed from Boer War service in the summer of 1900 for military indiscipline, and sent back to Canada. Letters in which Hughes charged the British military with incompetence had been published in Canada and South Africa. Hughes had also flagrantly disobeyed orders in a key operation by granting favourable terms to an enemy force which surrendered to him. Although Hughes had proved a competent, and sometimes exceptional, front-line officer, boastfulness and impatience told strongly against him. Hughes's demand for a VC was refused, but as a consolation prize, his demand to be knighted for his Boer War services was granted, albeit only belatedly in 1915, and therefore Hughes was proud to be known as "Sir Sam". By this time, Hughes had become convinced that he deserved not one, but two VCs for his service in South Africa, a demand that exasperated the War Office in London, who patiently told Hughes one could not recommend oneself for the VC, and his requests for a VC bar could not be considered.

== Shadow defence minister ==
As the defence critic in the Conservative shadow cabinet, Hughes who was widely read on military history, current military trends, and issues in the Canadian militia proved a vigorous and effective shadow defence minister, accusing the defence minister, Sir Frederick Borden, of being ineffectual in handling his portfolio. Hughes was also well known for his attacks upon the immigration policy of the Laurier government, charging that Canada needed more immigrants of "good British stock". The subject of settling the Prairies much interested Hughes as he served as an agent between 1902 and 1905 for the Canadian Northern Railway headed by his friend, William Mackenzie, travelling twice to the Prairies to select the route for the CNR. Amery, having first met Hughes in the Boer War, followed him on his second trip across the Prairies, writing about how he talked with great passion about his plans to build the "finest city" on the Prairies. In the 1904 election, the Liberals triumphed in a landslide, and even Hughes held on to his seat in Victoria County by a narrow margin. The Conservative leader, Robert Borden, lost his own seat in Halifax, and Hughes offered to resign to allow Borden to represent Victoria County. Though Borden chose another safe Conservative seat in Ontario to represent, he thanked Hughes for his "kindness" in offering up his own seat.

Hughes was also active in the Imperial Federation movement, regularly corresponding with both Joseph Chamberlain and Alfred Milner on the issue, and every year from 1905 onward, introduced a resolution in the House of Commons calling for an "equal partnership union" of the Dominions with the United Kingdom. In this, Hughes often confounded Milner and Chamberlain, who thought he was the foremost Canadian champion of the Imperial Federation concept, as what Hughes wanted was for Canada to become an equal partner in running the British empire, instead of playing the more subordinate role that Milner and Chamberlain had envisioned. Hughes favoured a protectionist policy of Imperial Preference, but unlike Chamberlain, he insisted that Imperial Preference be tied to "equal partnership" with an Imperial cabinet of all the Dominion prime ministers plus the British prime minister to decide policy for the entire empire. Hughes repeatedly objected to Chamberlain's concept of the British prime minister and cabinet deciding questions for the Dominions, and Haycock wrote what Hughes wanted sounds very similar to the British Commonwealth that emerged after 1931.

In 1906, after repeatedly hammering the immigration minister, Clifford Sifton in debate, Hughes's motion calling for the Canadian government to give preference in handing out land in the Prairie provinces of Alberta, Saskatchewan and Manitoba to veterans of the British Army was accepted as policy. Like other English-Canadians at the time, Hughes believed that too many immigrants from Eastern Europe were being allowed to settle on the Prairies, and instead the Prairies should be settled by immigrants from Britain, with veterans in particular encouraged to settle. In 1907 Hughes told the House of Commons that Catholic immigrants from Europe were "a curse upon Canada". Despite being publicly censured by the Conservative leader Robert Borden for his "curse upon Canada" remark with Borden insisting that the Conservative Party was not a sectarian party, two months later in June 1907 at the Orange Order's national convention in Vancouver, Hughes repeated his thesis that Catholic immigrants were a "curse upon Canada", which was followed up with the warning that the Orangemen would never vote Conservative again if Borden expelled Hughes. Hughes's ability to bring out the votes of the Orange Order for the Conservatives ensured that Borden did not expel him despite the way in which he kept sabotaging Borden's efforts to reach out to Catholic voters.

Hughes, who claimed to have been offered but declined the post of Deputy Minister of Militia in 1891, was appointed Minister of Militia after the election of Borden in 1911, with the aim of creating a distinct Canadian army within the British Empire, to be used in case of war. He wrote a letter to the Governor General, the Duke of Connaught, about his longtime demand for the Victoria Cross. Connaught privately recommended that Borden get rid of him. Chartrand described Hughes as an individual endowed with "great charm, wit, and driving energy, allied with consummate political skills", but on the negative side called him "a stubborn, pompous racist" and a "passionate Orange Order supremacist" who did little to disguise his dislike of Catholics in general and of French-Canadians in particular. Hughes's views later did much to put off French-Canadians and Irish-Canadians from supporting the war effort in World War I. Chartrand further wrote that Hughes was a megalomaniac with a grotesquely inflated sense of his own importance who "would admit no contradiction to his views". Hughes's own son, Garnet, wrote: "God help he who goes against my father's will".

== Minister of Militia and Defence ==
Borden had "profound misgivings" about appointing Hughes to the cabinet, but as Hughes insisted on the defence portfolio, and Borden owed Hughes a political debt for his past loyalty, he received his wish to be appointed defence minister. This debt went back to Borden's days as the embattled Leader of the Official Opposition, when Hughes, then shadow defence minister, had been loyal to him at a time when many Conservative MPs wanted a new leader after Borden lost two general elections in a row in 1904 and 1908. Hughes was by then a colonel in the militia, and he insisted on wearing his uniform at all times, including cabinet meetings. In 1912, Hughes promoted himself to the rank of major general. An energetic minister, Hughes travelled all over Canada in his private luxury railroad car to attend parades and manoeuvres by the militia. His penchant for colourful and flamboyant statements made him a media favourite, and journalists were always asking the defence minister for his opinions on any subject, secure in the knowledge that Hughes was likely to say something outrageous that would help to sell newspapers. Berton described Hughes as "...a staunch Britisher, but also a staunch Canadian nationalist, who was absolutely determined that Canada should not be a vassal of the mother country". Hughes saw the Dominions as equal partners of the United Kingdom in the management of the British empire, making claims for powers for Ottawa that anticipated the 1931 Statute of Westminster, and fiercely fought against attempts on the part of London to treat Canada in a mere colonial role.

In December 1911, Hughes announced that he was going to increase the militia budget and built more camps and drill halls for the militia. From 1911 to 1914, the defence budget rose from $7 million to $11 million per year. Hughes was openly hostile to the Permanent Active Militia, or Permanent Force, as Canada's small professional army was known, and praised the Non-Permanent Active Militia (often shortened to just "Militia") as reflecting the authentic fighting spirit of Canada. Taking the view that citizen soldiers were better soldiers than the professionals, Hughes cut spending on the "bar room loafers" as he called the Permanent Force to increase the size of the Non-Permanent Active Militia. Critics charged that Hughes favoured the Militia as it allowed him opportunities for patronage as he gave various friends and allies officers' commissions in the militia that did not exist with the Permanent Force, where promotion was based on merit. Hughes did not have much interest in the Royal Canadian Navy (RCN), which had been founded by Laurier in 1910, in large part because the Navy by its very existence required a full-time force of professionals, which did not fit in well with the Defence Minister's enthusiasm for citizen-soldiers. Furthermore, the Navy was under the Department of Naval Services, which made it rival to the Defence Department in terms of military spending. But at the same time, Hughes was opposed to Borden's plans to disband the Navy and instead have Canada contribute some $35 million directly to the British Royal Navy, preferring that Canada have its own navy. During the naval debates in 1912, Hughes supported retaining the "tin-pot navy" as the RCN was often called and helped to ensure its continued existence.

In April 1912, Hughes caused much controversy when he forbade militia regiments in Quebec from taking part in Catholic processions, a practice that went back to the days of New France, and had been tolerated under British rule and since 1867 under Confederation. Hughes justified the move as upholding secularism, but Quebec newspapers noted that Hughes was an Orangeman, and blamed his decision as due to the anti-Catholic prejudices one could expect from a member of the Loyal Orange Order. Hughes's practice of pushing out experienced Permanent Force officers serving on the general staff in favour of militia officers and his lavish spending were also the causes of controversy. Hughes used the Defence Department funds to give a free Ford Model T car to every militia colonel in Canada, a move which caused much criticism. In 1913, Hughes went on an all-expenses paid junket to Europe together with his family, his secretaries, and various militia colonels who were his friends and their families. Hughes justified the trip, which lasted several months, as necessary to observe military manoeuvres in Britain, France and Switzerland, but to many Canadians, it appeared more like an expensive vacation taken with the taxpayer's money.

Hughes's intention was to make militia service compulsory for every able-bodied male, a plan that caused considerable public opposition. Chartrand wrote that Hughes's plan for compulsory militia service, based on the example of Switzerland, failed to take into account the differences between Switzerland, a highly conformist society in Central Europe vs. Canada, a more individualistic society in North America. The reasons Hughes gave for a larger Swiss-style militia were moral, not military. A strong believer in temperance, Hughes banned alcohol from militia camps and believed that compulsory militia was the best way of stamping out the consumption of alcohol in Canada. In a speech in Napanee in 1913, Hughes declared he wanted to :

"To make the youth of Canada self-controlled, erect, decent and patriotic through military and physical training, instead of growing up to as under present conditions of no control, into young ruffians or young gadabouts; to ensure peace by national preparedness for war; to make military camps and drill halls throughout Canada clean, wholesome, sober and attractive to boys and young men; to give that final touch to imperial unity, and crown the arch of responsible government by an inter-Imperial Parliament dealing only with Imperial affairs".

Hughes's campaign for compulsory militia service as a form of moral reformation to save the alleged wayward young men of Canada from lives of debauchery and licentiousness made him into one of the better known and most controversial ministers in the Borden government. Borden himself wanted to sack Hughes, whom he regarded as a political liability, by 1913 but was afraid of his bellicose defence minister to whom he also owned some major political debts. Borden was a gentlemanly and mild-mannered lawyer from Halifax who was intimidated by Hughes, a huge blustering and combative Orangeman overtly fond of getting into brawls, who wrote "long, vituperative letters" at the slightest criticism, claimed to be "loved by millions" of voters, and often compared himself to a train and his critics to dogs. Hughes himself often said that Borden was "gentle hearted as a girl".

== First World War ==
=== Outbreak of war ===
In 1839, a treaty had been signed by Prussia and Britain guaranteeing the independence and neutrality of Belgium. On 2 August 1914, Imperial Germany, which had assumed Prussia's commitment to Belgian neutrality and independence in 1871, invaded Belgium as the German chancellor Dr. Theobald von Bethmann Hollweg dismissed the guarantee as a "mere scrap of paper". The question facing British leaders was whether the United Kingdom would honour the guarantee of Belgium by declaring war on Germany or not. On the morning of 3 August 1914, Hughes arrived at the Defence Department, visibly upset and angry, and according to those present cried out: "They are going to skunk it! They seem to be looking for an excuse to get out of helping France. Oh! What a shameful state of things! By God, I don't want to be a Britisher under such conditions!" When it was pointed out that the British cabinet had called an emergency meeting to discuss the invasion of Belgium, Hughes replied: "They are curs enough to do it; I can read between the lines. I believe they will temporize and hum and haw too long-and by God, I don't want to be a Britisher under such conditions-it is too humiliating." Hughes asked if the Union Jack was flying in front of the Defence Department, and upon being told it was, shouted: "Then send up and have it taken down! I will not have it over Canada's military headquarters, when Britain shirks her plain duty-it is disgraceful!" The Union Jack was pulled down, and only put up again the next day, when it was announced that Britain had sent an ultimatum demanding that Germany pull out of Belgium at once, and upon its rejection, Britain had honoured the guarantee of Belgium by declaring war on Germany, shortly after midnight on 4 August 1914. As Canada was part of the British Empire, the Dominion was automatically at war. In a speech (in French) to the House of Commons, Laurier, who had become the leader of the Official Opposition after losing the 1911 election, stated: "When the call comes, our answer goes at once, and it goes in the classical language of the British answer to the call of duty, 'Ready, aye, ready'." Laurier's speech captured the mood of the nation in August 1914 and most Canadians wanted to aid the "mother country" as it faced its greatest challenge yet.

On 7 August 1914, Borden announced to the House of Commons that the British government had just accepted his offer of an expeditionary force to Europe. In 1911, the General Staff under Major General Sir Willoughby Gwatkin had drawn up a plan in the event of a war in Europe for mobilizing the militia that called for Canada to send an expeditionary force of one infantry division and an independent cavalry brigade together with artillery and support units from the Permanent Force that was to be assembled at Camp Petawawa outside of Ottawa. Much to everyone's surprise, Hughes disregarded the General Staff's plan and refused to mobilize the militia, instead creating a brand new organization called the Canadian Expeditionary Force (CEF) made up of numbered battalions that was separate from the militia. Instead of going to the existing Camp Petawawa, Hughes chose to build a new camp at Valcartier, outside of Quebec City, for the CEF. Hughes's sudden decision not to call out the militia and create the CEF threw Canadian mobilization into complete chaos as a new bureaucracy had to be created at the same time that thousands of young men flocked to the colors.

Morton wrote that in August–September 1914 "...a sweating, swearing, sublimely happy Hughes pulled some kind of order from the chaos he had created." In the process, Hughes managed to insult everyone from the Governor General, the Duke of Connaught, to the French-Canadian community. When the president of the Toronto chapter of the Humane Society visited Hughes to express concern about the neglect and mistreatment of horses at Camp Valcartier, Hughes called him a liar and personally picked him up and tossed him out of his office. Likewise, when John Farthing, the Anglican bishop of Montreal, visited Hughes to complain about the shortage of Church of England chaplains at Valcartier to tend to the spiritual needs of Anglican volunteers, Hughes burst into a rage and began to loudly swear at Farthing, making liberal use of a number of four letter words not normally used to address an Anglican bishop, who was predictably shocked. Though Hughes worked hard at ensuring the construction of Camp Valcartier and trying to bring order to the chaos he caused by not calling out the militia, almost everyone who knew him was convinced he was in some way insane. The Duke of Connaught wrote in a report to London that Hughes was "off his base". A Conservative MP from Toronto, Angus Claude Macdonell, told Borden "The man is insane", and that Canada needed a new defence minister at once. The deputy prime minister, Sir George Foster, wrote in his diary on 22 September 1914: "There is only one feeling about Sam. That he is crazy." The industrialist, Sir Joseph Flavelle, wrote that Hughes was "mentally unbalanced with the low cunning and cleverness often associated with the insane." Borden in his memoirs wrote about Hughes that his behavior was "so eccentric as to justify the conclusion that his mind was unbalanced".

Hughes encouraged the recruitment of volunteers following the First World War's outbreak and ordered the construction of Camp Valcartier on August 7, 1914, demanding it to be finished by the time the entire force was assembled. With the aid of 400 workmen, Hughes saw the completion of the camp. Unfortunately the camp was poorly organized. With approximately 33,000 recruits, training became a chaotic process. There was little time to train the volunteers, so the training system was rushed. Another problem was that the camp's population was constantly growing, which made planning a difficult task.

Hughes was infamous for belligerently giving orders to troops and their officers and he publicly criticized officers in front of their men, telling one officer who was speaking too quietly for his liking "Pipe up, you little bugger or get out of the service!" When Hughes addressed one officer as a captain, only to be told by the man that he was a lieutenant, Hughes promoted him on the spot to captain. When it was pointed out that he did not have that power as minister of defence, Hughes shouted "Sir, I know what I'm talking about!" and said if he wanted to promote the officer to a captain, then the officer was a captain. Hughes insisted on riding around the camp surrounded by an honour guard of lancers and shouting out orders for infantry manoeuvres long since removed from the training manuals like "Form square!"; when presented with such commands, the soldiers did their best to guess what it was he wanted them to do, though Hughes seemed well satisfied. Volunteer morale was challenged by inadequate tents, shortages of greatcoats, and confusion regarding equipment and storage. However, Hughes was praised for the speed of his actions by Prime Minister Borden and members of the cabinet. All of the officers Hughes chose to command the brigades and battalions of the First Contingent were Anglo-Canadians. François-Louis Lessard, a Permanent Force officer with an outstanding record in the Boer War was denied by Hughes permission to join the First Contingent even through his record certainly merited such an appointment. Lessard was a Permanent Force man, a Catholic and a French-Canadian, and for all reasons, Hughes would not allow him to join the CEF. Recruitment of volunteers in Quebec might have yielded better results if Lessard had been given a command position. By October 1914, the troops were mobilized and ready to leave for England. As the First Contingent embarked for Europe in Quebec City on 3 October 1914, Hughes sat astride his horse to deliver a speech that caused the men of the First Contingent to boo and jeer him. Borden wrote in his diary that Hughes's speech was "flamboyant and grandiloquent" and that "Everybody [was] laughing at Sam's address."

Despite Hughes's claims about the superiority of Canadians over British soldiers, two-thirds of the First Contingent were British immigrants to Canada. The majority of the 1,811 officers of the First Contingent were Canadian-born men who had previously held commissions in the Militia or Permanent Force. The Canadian historian Jack Granatstein wrote that an "extraordinary" 228,170 of the about 470,000 British male immigrants in Canada enlisted in the CEF during the war, making them easily the largest ethnic group in the CEF at 48.5%, and not until conscription was introduced in 1917 did the majority of the CEF finally become Canadian-born. Even in 1918, the Canadian-born soldiers consisted of 51.4% of the total serving, with the majority of the rest being British immigrants.

=== Preparation of troops ===
Hughes left for London at the same time as the First Contingent did, as he heard correct reports that the British War Secretary, Lord Kitchener, was planning on breaking up the CEF when it arrived in Britain to assign its battalions to the British Army. As Hughes took an ocean liner he arrived in Southampton several days before the CEF's arrival, and upon his landing, he told the British press that if it was not for him that the convoy of 30 ships taking the CEF across the North Atlantic would have been torpedoed by U-boats, though just how Hughes had saved the 30 ships from U-boats was left unexplained. Hughes was determined that the CEF fight together and upon arriving in London, went dressed in his full ceremonial uniform as a major general in the Canadian militia, to see Kitchener. Hughes clashed with Kitchener and insisted quite vehemently that the CEF not be broken up. In a telegram to Borden, Hughes wrote: "I determined that Canada was not to be treated as a Crown Colony and that, as we paid the bill and furnished the goods, which in nearly every instance were better than the British, I would act." Hughes won his bureaucratic battle with Kitchener and ensured the CEF stayed together, mostly by arguing that since the Dominion was paying the entire costs of maintaining the CEF, the Dominion government should have the final say over its deployment. Berton wrote that ensuring the CEF stayed together was Hughes's greatest achievement, as without his intervention in October 1914, what ultimately became the Canadian Corps of four divisions would never have existed. In the fall of 1914, Hughes created the Shell Committee to manufacture shells and bullets for both the Canadians and the British. By Christmas 1914, the Shell Committee had orders for 2 million shells and 1.9 million brass casings.

As the CEF took up its training facilities on Salisbury Plain, Hughes wanted the 1st Canadian Division to be commanded by a Canadian general. He very reluctantly accepted a British officer, Lieutenant General Sir Edwin Alderson, as the commander of the 1st Division when it turned out that there was no qualified Canadian officer. Hughes's insistence on supplying the CEF with Canadian-made equipment, regardless of its quality, made for difficult conditions for the men of the CEF, with many soldiers already complaining about the Ross rifle in training. Alderson replaced the Shield Shovels invented by Hughes's secretary, Ena MacAdam, with the standard British Army shovel, much to the relief of the CEF and to Hughes's fury. Hughes constantly sought to undermine Alderson's command, regularly involving himself in divisional matters that were not the normal concern of a defence minister. The first Canadian unit to see action was Princess Patricia's Canadian Light Infantry, a regiment privately raised by a wealthy Montreal industrialist, Hamilton Gault, which arrived on the Western Front in December 1914, separately from the First Contingent. On 16 February 1915, the CEF arrived in France to head for the front lines, taking up position at the crucial Ypres Salient in Belgium.

On 22 April 1915, at the Ypres salient, the German Army unleashed 160 tons of chlorine gas. From the German lines arose an ominous yellow cloud which floated across no-man's land to bring death and suffering to the Allied soldiers on the other side, killing 1,400 French and Algerian soldiers in the trenches, leaving another 2,000 blinded while the rest broke and fled in terror. Despite the dangers of the gas which blinded when it did not kill, the 1st Canadian Division stepped up to hold the line on the night of 22–23 April and prevented the Germans from marching through the 4-mile hole in the Allied lines created when the French and Algerians fled. On 23 April, the Germans unleashed the chlorine gas on the Canadian lines, leading to "desperate fighting" as the Canadians used improvised gas-masks of urine-soaked rags while complaining about the Ross rifles, which too often jammed up in combat. The Second Battle of Ypres was the first major battle for the Canadians, costing the 1st Division 6,035 men killed, wounded, or missing, while Princess Patricia's battalion lost 678 dead, and gave the CEF a reputation as a "tough force" that was to last for the rest of the war. The Canadians had held the line at Ypres in spite of appalling conditions and unlike the French and Algerians, the Canadians did not flee when faced with the cloud of gas.

Hughes was ecstatic at the news that the Canadians had won their first battle, which in his own mind validated everything he had done as defence minister. At the same time, Hughes attacked Alderson for the losses at Ypres, claiming that a Canadian general would have done a better job and was furious when he learned that Alderson wanted to replace the Ross rifles with Lee-Enfield rifles. In a telegram to Max Aitken, the Canadian millionaire living in London whom Hughes had appointed as his representative in Britain, Hughes wrote: "It is the general opinion that scores of our officers can teach the British officers for many moons to come." In September 1915, the Second Contingent arrived on the Western Front in the form of the 2nd Canadian Division, and the Canadian Corps was created. Alderson was appointed the corps commander, while for first time, Canadians were given divisional command with Arthur Currie of Victoria taking command of the 1st Division and Richard Turner of Quebec City taking command of the 2nd Division. Hughes himself had wanted to take command of the Canadian Corps, but Borden had prevented this. In May 1915, Hughes first learned that Currie had embezzled some $10,000 from his militia regiment in Victoria in June 1914 and the police were recommending criminal charges be brought against him. One of Hughes's agents, Harold Daly, wrote after the war he had been ordered by the Defence Minister "to assure General Currie that his personal interests were being looked after and he was on no account to worry." In the spring of 1915, the Second Contingent had been raised and departed for training in England.

=== Accusations of mismanagement ===
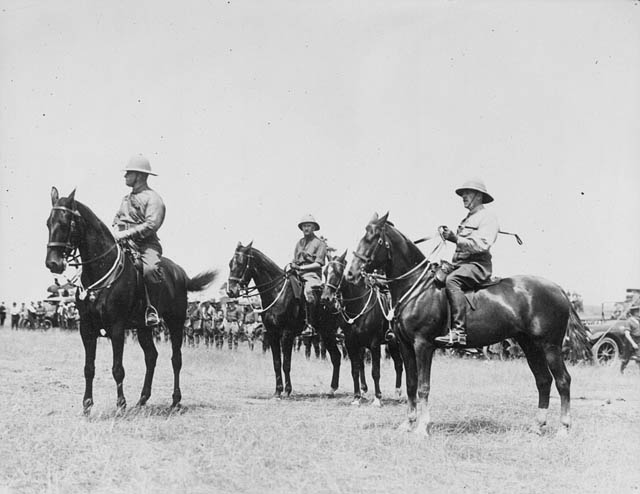
Major General Sam Hughes (left) at the saluting base during the review of Canadian troops at Camp Borden, ca. 1916.

Hughes was knighted as a Knight Commander of the Order of the Bath, on August 24, 1915. In 1916 he was made an honorary lieutenant general in the British Army. A Regimental and King's Colours display and plaque at Knox Presbyterian Church (Ottawa) is dedicated to the memory of those who served in the 207th (Ottawa-Carleton) Battalion, CEF during the First World War. The Regimental Colours were donated by the American Bank Note Company and presented by Hughes to the battalion on Parliament Hill on November 18, 1916.

In spite of mounting criticism from 1915 onward at the way in which Hughes ran the Defence Department in wartime, the politically indebted Borden kept Hughes on.To Borden, events seemed to prove that many of Hughes's opinions were right, as the prime minister visited the Western Front in the summer of 1915 and became convinced that much of what Hughes had to say about the inefficiency of the British Army was correct. Hughes's methods were unorthodox and chaotic, but Hughes argued he was merely cutting through the red-tape to help "the boys" in the field. Finally, Borden in his dealings with British officials often found them patronising and condescending, which led him to side with his nationalist defence minister who argued that Canadians were the equals of the "mother country" in imperial affairs, and should not be talked down to.

The same summer, it emerged that the Shell Committee had $170 million worth in orders to fulfill while it delivered only $5.5 million of its orders, with accusations being made that Hughes's friends were engaging in war profiting. With the support of Borden, the British Minister of Munitions, David Lloyd George stopped all orders until Canada created the Imperial Munitions Board headed by the industrialist Sir Joseph Flavelle. Flavelle ended the corruption and increased efficiency in the munitions industry, reaching the point that by 1917 Canadian factories were turning out some $2 million worth of shells per day. Hughes was enraged at the way that Flavelle had taken over an important function from his department, and even more that the Imperial Munitions Board was far more efficient and honest than the Defence Department had been. Despite the scandal caused by the Shell Committee, which led Borden to face very embarrassing questions in the House of Commons and to hopes on the part of Laurier that he might become prime minister again, Hughes was not sacked.

Between October 1914 – September 1915, 71 battalions had been raised for the CEF by the existing militia regiments, but the losses in the war required even more men. In August 1915, Hughes announced that any individual or group could form a "chum's battalion" (also known as a "pal's battalion") for the CEF, leading to the formation of various units such as Highland battalions for Scots-Canadians, Irish battalions for Irish-Canadians, "sports" battalions based upon men interested in common sport like hockey, American battalions for American volunteers, Orange battalions for Orangemen, "bantam" battalions for men shorter than 5′2″, and so forth. The "pal's battalion" campaign was based upon the "chum's battalion" campaign launched in Britain in 1914. Though Hughes's "pal's battalions" campaign raised 170 new battalions by 1916, only 40 reached full strength, and many of the men who joined during the "pal's" campaign were underage, unfit, or too old, as recruiting colonels were more concerned about the quantity of volunteers than the quality. Of only those Canadians who saw combat in the war, 60% had joined by the end of 1915, and by the beginning of 1916 the number of volunteers fell off drastically with only 2,810 men volunteering between July 1916 – October 1917. In March 1916, a 3rd Division was formed by amalgamating Princess Patricia's Light Infantry, the Royal Canadian Regiment (a Permanent Force regiment, which previously guarded Bermuda against the unlikely threat of German invasion), and various mounted rifle units that had been stationed in England since the spring of 1915. The 3rd Division first saw action on 1 June 1916 in the Battle of Mount Sorrel, which was lost to the Germans and then taken back by 13 June. In September 1916, the Canadian Corps entered the Battle of the Somme, fighting on until the end of the battle in November, and suffered 24,029 casualties. The "chum's battalions" raised in 1915 were formed into the 4th Division, which first saw action on the Somme on 10 October 1916. The 4th Division was commanded by David Watson, the owner of the Quebec Chronicle newspaper, who been personally chosen by Hughes, who thought highly of him.

Hughes, an Orangeman prone to anti-Catholic sentiments and not well liked among French Canadians, increased tensions by sending Anglocentrics to recruit French Canadians, and by forcing French volunteers to speak English in training. He reluctantly accepted Japanese-Canadians and Chinese-Canadians for the CEF and assigned black Canadians to construction units. However, some black Canadians did manage to enlist as infantrymen, as Chartrand noted that in a painting by Eric Kennington of the 16th Canadian Scottish Battalion marching through the ruins of a French village, one of the soldiers wearing kilts in the painting is a black man. In marked contrast to his attitudes towards black Canadian and Asian Canadian volunteers, Hughes encouraged the enlistment of First Nations volunteers into the CEF as it was believed that Indians would make for ferocious soldiers. The First Nations volunteers were generally assigned as snipers out of the belief that Indians were expert marksmen, and the most deadly sniper of the war with 378 kills was the Ojibwa Francis Pegahmagabow.

Despite orders from the Governor General not to, Hughes used Defence Department funds to buy newspaper ads in the neutral United States recruiting for the American Legion that he planned to form within the CEF. Borden was unaware until early 1916 that Hughes had recruited a battalion of American volunteers, which he first learned of after receiving American complaints about Canadian violations of American neutrality. Borden was even astonished to learn that an American Unitarian clergyman living in Toronto, the Reverend C.S. Bullock, whom Hughes had appointed his chief recruiter for the American Legion, had also received from Hughes a colonel's commission in the CEF despite having no military experience.

Between 1914 and 1916, Hughes raised in total about half million volunteers for the CEF, of whom only about 13,000 were French-Canadians. Hughes's hostility towards French Canada together with his decision not to call out the militia in 1914 contributed at least in part to the failure of recruiting in Quebec, despite the Defence Department spending $30,000 in Quebec in a campaign headed by Colonel Arthur Mignault in 1916 to recruit more volunteers. After the battle of Courcelette in 1916, two of the CEF's battalions from Quebec, the 163rd Poil-aux-pattes commanded by Olivar Asselin and the 189th, a group of hard-fighting Gaspésiens who included two winners of the Victoria Cross, had to be broken up owing to a lack of replacements for their losses. The remaining men from the 163rd and 189th went into the 22nd Battalion, the future "Van Doos", whose men won more decorations for valor than any of the other battalions of the CEF by the end of the war. However, the failure of the recruiting efforts were also due to an attempt by the Ontario government in 1916 to ban schools for the French-Canadian minority in Ontario, which caused much resentment in Quebec, being seen as an attempt by the Orange Order, which was powerful in Ontario, to stamp out the French culture and language. Recruiting efforts in la belle province also failed due to Quebec's status as the most industrialised province as Montreal at the time was Canada's largest and wealthiest city. During the war, munitions and textile plants in Montreal offered higher wages than anything the CEF could offer, and many French-Canadian men preferred to support the war effort by working in a factory in Montreal rather than enlisting in the CEF. Granatstein noted that French-Canadians made up 30% of Canada's population, but only 4% of the CEF, and that French-Canadians living outside of Quebec, as the Acadians in New Brunswick, were more likely to enlist than those in Quebec.

Over the course of the war, the policies carried out by the Ministry of Defence and Militia were much marked by inefficiency and waste, largely caused by Hughes as Morton wrote: "Hughes's perennial contempt for military professionals, shared by his overseas agent, Max Aitken, became an excuse for chaos and influence-peddling in militia administration". As scandals continued from the exposure of wasteful purchasing in 1915 to the "munitions scandal" of 1916 which exposed Hughes's flunky J. Wesley Allison as corrupt, Borden took away various functions from Defence Ministry to be handled by an independent board or commission headed by men who were not cronies of Hughes. Hughes was widely resented and disliked by the men of the CEF and when Hughes visited Camp Borden in July 1916, "his boys" loudly booed him, blaming the minister for the shortages of water at Camp Borden.

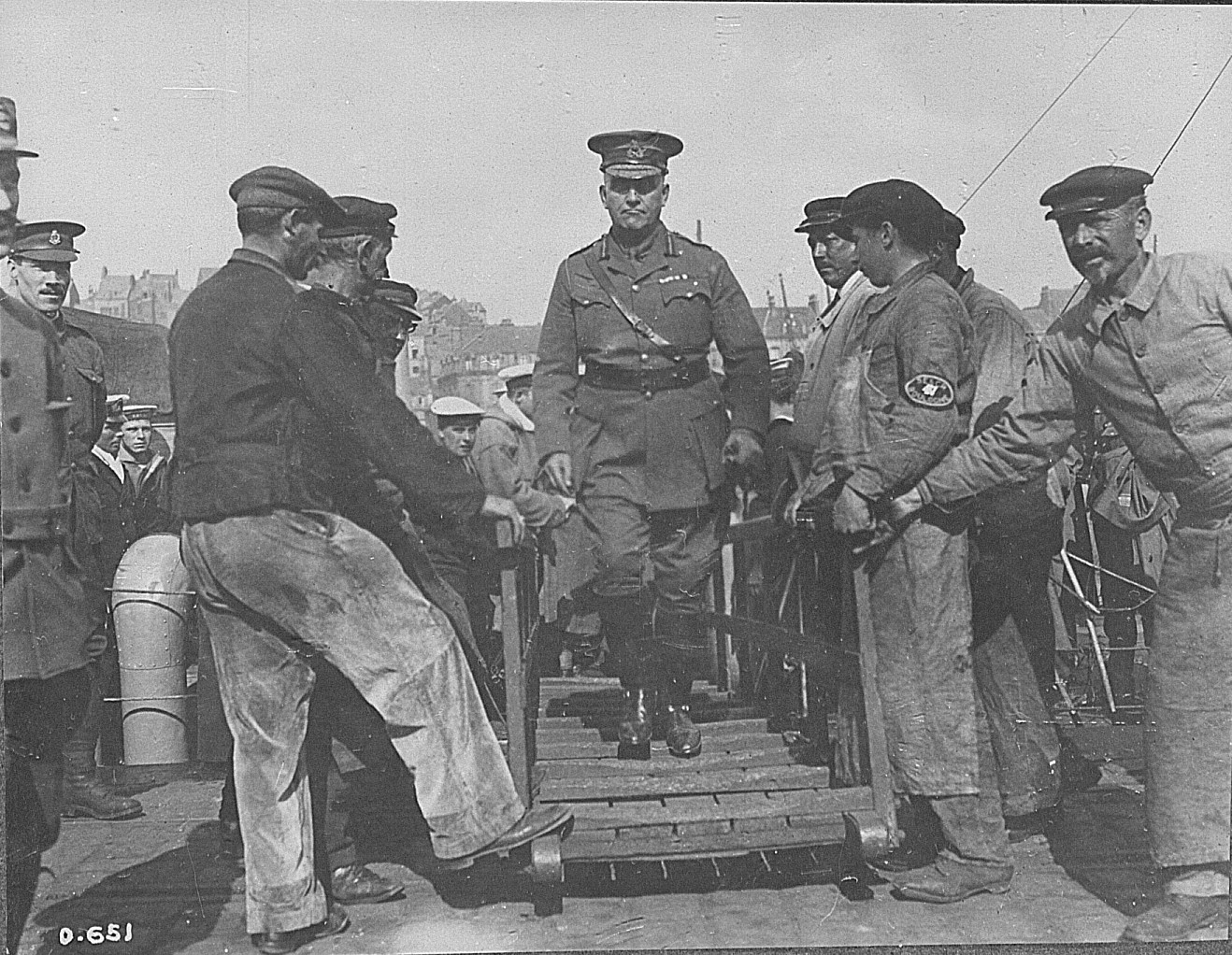
Hughes visiting the Front in August 1916

Hughes's policy of raising new battalions instead of sending the reinforcements to the existing battalions led to much administrative waste and ultimately led to most of the new battalions being broken up to provide manpower for the older battalions. To manage the Canadian Expeditionary Force in London, Hughes created a confusing system of overlapping authorities run by three senior officers, in order to make himself the ultimate arbiter of every issue. The most important of the officers in England was Major General John Wallace Carson, a mining magnate from Montreal and a friend of Hughes, who proved himself a skillful intriguer. While the officers in London feuded for Hughes's favour, what Morton called a "...burgeoning, wasteful, array of camps, offices, depots, hospitals, and commands spread out across England." Twice, Borden sent Hughes to England to impose order and efficiency, and twice the prime minister was gravely disappointed. In September 1916, Hughes acting on his own and without informing Borden, announced in London the formation of the "Acting Overseas Sub-Militia Council" to be chaired by Carson with Hughes's son-in-law to serve as the chief secretary.

=== Legacy as minister ===
Hughes' historical reputation has been sullied further by poor decisions on procurements for the force. Insisting on the utilization of Canadian manufactured equipment, Hughes presided over the deployment of equipment that was often inappropriate for the Western Front, or of dubious quality. Previous to 1917, this negatively affected the operational performance of the CEF. The Ross rifle, MacAdam Shield Shovel, boots and webbing (developed for use in the South African War), and the Colt machine gun were all Canadian items which were eventually replaced or abandoned due to quality or severe functionality issues. The management of spending for supplies was eventually taken away from Hughes and assigned to the newly formed War Purchasing Commission in 1915. It was not until Hughes' resignation in November 1916 that the Ross rifle was fully abandoned by the CEF in favour of the British standard Lee–Enfield rifle.

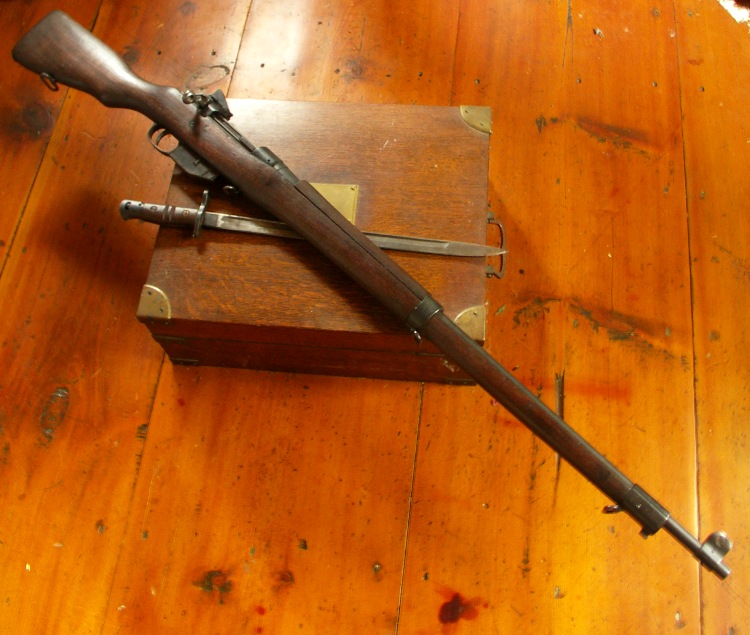
Ross Rifle

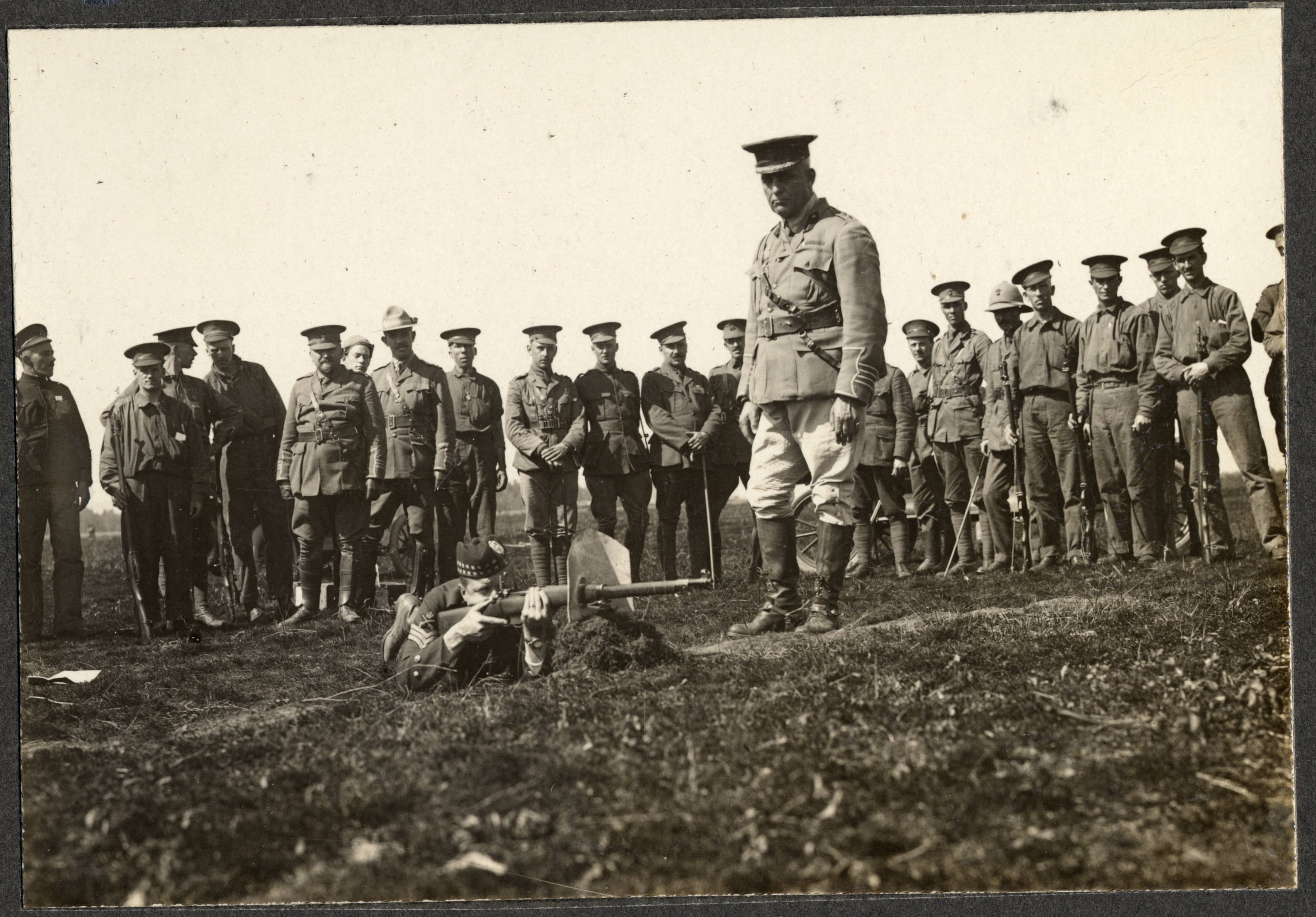
Colonel Sam Hughes watching Sergeant Hawkins demonstrating the MacAdam Shield Shovel

Canadian staff officers possessed an extremely limited level of experience and competence at the start of the war, having been discouraged from passing through the British Staff College for many years prior. Compounding the issue was Hughes' regular attempts to promote and appoint officers based upon patronage and Canadian nativism instead of ability, an act which not only created tension and jealousy between units but ultimately negatively affected the operating performance of the CEF as well. Lieutenant General Julian Byng, who replaced Alderson as commander of the CEF from May 1916, eventually became so incensed with the continuous interference on the part of Hughes that he threatened to resign. Byng, an aristocrat and a career British Army officer who was modest in his tastes and known for his care for his men, was very popular with the rank and file of the Canadian Corps, who called themselves "the Byng boys". This in turn sparked Hughes's jealousy. On 17 August 1916, Byng and Hughes had dinner where Hughes announced in his typical bombastic way that he never made a mistake and would hold the power of promotion within the Canadian Corps; Byng in reply stated that as a corps commander he had the power of promotion, that he would inform Hughes before any making promotions as a courtesy, and would resign if Hughes continued his interference with his command in the same way he had with Alderson. When Hughes claimed "I am never wrong", Byng replied "What a damn dull life you must have had, Minister!" Byng wanted to give command of the 2nd Division to Henry Burstall, who had greatly distinguished himself, over the objections of Hughes, who wanted to give command of the 2nd Division to his son Garnet, whom Byng regarded as a mediocrity unfit to command anything. Byng diplomatically told Hughes he had not appointed his son because the "Canadians deserved and expected the best leaders available". Byng wrote to Borden to say that he would not tolerate political interference in his corps, and he would resign if the younger Hughes was given the command of the 2nd Division rather than Burstall, who did indeed receive the appointment.

Criticism from Field Marshal Douglas Haig, King George V and from within his own party gradually forced Canadian Prime Minister Sir Robert Borden to tighten control over Hughes. The Toronto Globe in an editorial on 22 June 1916 attacked Hughes for his "swashbuckling" speeches that were damaging relations with Britain. Borden, becoming assertive as the war continued on, began to tire of Hughes's tirades before the cabinet, and hinted more than once he was thinking about sacking him. However, it was not until Hughes' political isolation, with the creation of the Ministry of the Overseas Military Forces of Canada, overseen by George Halsey Perley, and subsequent forced resignation in November 1916, that the CEF was able to concentrate on the task of the spring offensive without persistent staffing interference. The creation of the Ministry of Overseas Military Forces to run the CEF was a major reduction in Hughes's power, causing him to rage and threaten Borden. After Hughes sent Borden an extremely insulting letter on 1 November 1916, the prime minister vacillated for the next nine days before making his decision. Borden's patience with Hughes finally broke, and he dismissed him from the cabinet on 9 November 1916. In his letter dismissing him, Borden stated that he was fired because of his "strong tendency to assume powers which [he did] not possess", and because the prime minister no longer had the "time or energy" to keeping solving all of the problems he had created.

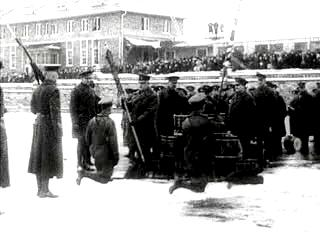
Sir Sam Hughes inspects 207th Battalion, CEF, and presents colours, 18 November 1916.

Hughes later claimed in Who's Who to have served "in France, 1914–15" despite not being released from his ministry and not having been given any command in the field. His presence at the Western Front was limited to his visits to troops.

== On the margins ==
Hughes's firing from the cabinet was greeted with relief by the rest of cabinet with the deputy prime minister Forster writing in his diary "the nightmare is removed". In the CEF, both the officers and the other ranks also generally welcomed his sacking. An embittered Hughes set out to embarrass Borden in the House of Commons by making accusations that Borden was mismanaging the war effort, though Hughes's determination to not appear unpatriotic imposed some limits on his willingness to attack the government. In his first speech to the Commons after his sacking on 20 January 1917, Hughes accused the finance minister, Sir William Thomas White, of running up the national debt irresponsibly, and his successor Albert Edward Kemp of mismanaging the defence ministry. By this time, Borden, whom many dismissed as a milquetoast at the beginning of the war, had shown himself to be tougher leader than many had expected, and for a great many people in English Canada, it was Borden rather than Hughes who emerged as the symbol of the national will to victory by 1917.

With the financial support of his millionaire friend Aitken, who was now ennobled as Lord Beaverbrook, Hughes planned to start a third party, the War Party, which would allow him to become prime minister. The plan called for Beaverbrook and another right-wing millionaire "press baron" Lord Rothermere to buy up most of the newspapers in English Canada to build support for the War Party. However, the plan collapsed when Rothermere showed no interest in the project, and Beaverbrook refused to move unless Rothermere joined the project. After Hughes's sacking, many of his friends abandoned him, and Beaverbrook was one of the few who remained close to him, though the fact that Beaverbrook was living in London meant he rarely saw him in person. In January 1917, Hughes floated another plan for Beaverbrook to use his influence with David Lloyd George, by then British prime minister, to have him in turn use his influence with King George V to have Hughes appointed to the Privy Council. Lloyd George consulted with Borden, who emphatically stated that the king should be not advised to give Hughes a seat on the Privy Council. Lloyd George told Beaverbrook that Hughes could best serve the war effort by remaining a backbench Conservative MP in Canada. At the same time, Hughes remained frustrated that Garnet Hughes was only commanding the 5th Canadian Division in England, which was used for training men sent to the four front line divisions of the Canadian Corps. When Currie replaced Byng as the commander of the Canadian Corps, Hughes wrote to him, saying it was time for his son to command the 1st Division. When Currie kept the younger Hughes in command of the 5th Division, Hughes turned on him. As Currie had embezzled money from his militia regiment in June 1914, and was only being saved from criminal charges in 1915 when Hughes intervened on his behalf, the latter accused the former of ingratitude.

By 1917, Hughes had become extremely paranoid, writing in a letter to his son Garnet, that his mail was being "tampered with...and they even had detectives on prominent friends of mine." In the same letter, Hughes called the war effort "hell on earth" without him to lead it, and labelled Borden a "weakling". The Canadian historian Tim Cook wrote by 1917 Hughes was losing his mind as he "appeared to be suffering from some form of nascent dementia". Borden decided to break his promise against conscription because of mounting casualties, he proposed in May 1917 a coalition Union government that would bring together the Conservatives and the Liberals. Laurier refused, but many English Canadian Liberal MPs crossed the floor to join the Union government. Hughes was against the idea of the Union government, saying at a Tory caucus meeting that a Union government would "forever wipe out" the Conservative Party. Hughes saw a coalition government as being a hostile takeover of the Conservative Party by the Liberals. In the Conscription crisis of 1917, Hughes attacked Borden at first for bringing in conscription, claiming that enough volunteers to keep the Canadian Corps fighting would have been found had he continued as Defence Minister, but he changed his mind after receiving pro-conscription letters from his constituents in Victoria County. In the 1917 election Hughes did not run at first as a Union candidate, instead running as a Conservative, and his main challenger was a Union candidate endorsed by Borden. Three weeks before the election, Hughes finally declared his support for the Union government, which led the Unionist candidate to drop out in favour of Hughes. In the 1917 election, Hughes was returned with his greatest margin of victory ever. Hughes during his time as Defence Minister had used funds from the Dominion government to bring about a number of municipal improvements in Lindsay, increasing his popularity in Victoria County. One visitor from Toronto asked a local farmer what county he was in, and received the reply "This is Sam Hughes's country!"

After Currie won the Battles of Hill 70, Lens, and finally Passchendaele in November 1917, Hughes requested a meeting in January 1918 with Borden to discuss "Lens and somewhat similar massacres". When Borden refused, Hughes accused Currie in another letter to Borden of "massacres" of "my boys" due to "bullheadness and incompetency". At least part of the motive for the attack on Currie was the failure of the War Party, which led Hughes to make it his life mission to "expose the whole rotten show overseas" to ruin the reputation of Borden. In a letter to Lord Beaverbrook, Hughes wrote: "Currie was a coward at St. Julien and a damned fool ever since. He was the cause of practically having murdered thousands of men at Lens and Paschendaele [Passchendaele], and it is generally supposed the motive was to prevent the possibility of Turner coming back with the Second Army Corps, and to prevent Garnet from commanding a Division." Cook described this letter as the most malicious of all Hughes's accusations against Currie as he was claiming that Currie had deliberately caused the deaths of hundreds of thousands of Canadians to force the government to send reinforcements to the Canadian Corps, and thereby prevent the creation of a second corps to be commanded by Turner, who had been dismissed from active command in 1916.

Ignoring the existence of the Imperial War Cabinet, Hughes in a speech in Toronto claimed: "A Dominion which sends to a European war an army immeasurably greater than the Allied armies sent to the Crimea cannot again have the issue of peace and war determined for her by a government in which she is not represented." In another speech at a Masonic Lodge in Toronto on 9 January 1918, he demanded that all males in the age group 10–16 undergo militia training. In spite of concerns about possible riots, Hughes travelled to Montreal to give a speech attacking Borden for not conscripting what he claimed were 700,000 young men all across Canada. His speeches attacking Borden in Toronto and Montreal were well received by his audiences. On 6 May 1918, Hughes in a speech before the Commons denounced the Ministry of Overseas Forces for an excessive number of bureaucrats, and for the first time indirectly attacked Currie as he spoke of officers with a "reckless disregard for life". In October 1918, Hughes had written Borden a letter accusing Currie of "useless massacres of our Canadian boys, as needlessly occurred at Cambrai." Borden ignored Hughes's request that Currie and his "Black-hand Gang" be sacked.

== Feud with Currie ==
The news of the Armistice on 11 November 1918 was ill-received by Hughes, who felt that Currie had stolen the glory of victory was rightfully his. In December 1918, Currie learned from friends in Canada that Hughes was telling anybody who would listen that he was "a murderer, a coward, a drunkard and almost everything else that is bad and vile". In a letter to his sister, Currie wrote "Sam Hughes is a vindictive and bitterly disappointed man, and so is his son Garnet".

On 4 March 1919, in a speech before the Commons, Hughes accused Currie of "needlessly sacrificing the lives of Canadian soldiers". As part of his speech, Hughes read out several of his 1918 letters to Borden, which was thereby entered in Hansard (allowing the press to quote from them), and thus incriminated Borden in his accusations against Currie. In particular, Hughes made much of the Second Battle of Mons in November 1918, claiming that Currie had only attacked Mons to have the Canadian Corps end the war for the British Empire where it began (the British Expeditionary Force fought its first battle at Mons in August 1914). Hughes always attacked Currie in speeches in the Commons, where criminal and civil law did not apply, ensuring he did not need fear a libel suit or a criminal charges for selectively quoting from official documents that were still classified as secret. Hughes's controversial speech attracted much attention. Hughes's speech accusing Currie of "murder" left most Canadians at the time "stunned". On 5 March 1919, The Toronto Daily Star published as a lead story on the front page a defence of Currie's leadership at the Second Battle of Cambrai, noting that Currie had the infantry supported by tanks encircle Cambrai, instead of the "mad frontal assault" claimed by Hughes. The Toronto Globe in an editorial on 6 March wrote: "The terrors of the war have been great and manifold for our gallant men in France, but Sir Sam Hughes is a greater terror than any of them. The enemy never dealt a fouler blow than that directed by Sir Sam Hughes against the leaders of the Canadian Army still in the field and unable to defend themselves". Cook noted the strangest aspect of the Hughes-Currie affair was that Hughes did not reveal that Currie was an embezzler, something that greatly worried Currie at the time. Hughes may have restrained himself as the fact he prevented criminal charges from being laid against Currie in 1915 would have left himself open to charges of obstruction of justice and abuse of his powers as defence minister.

In his last two years of his life, Hughes believed that it was Currie, whom he was relentless in attacking, as the man behind what he regarded as the plots against him. In a letter to Garnet in May 1919, he wrote: "I have the fullest evidence now that upwards of nine months or more ago, instructions have been issued in a propaganda form to certain writers and correspondents, 'On every occasion, Sir Sam must be overshadowed by others'. And in several instances I have the definite instructions, 'Under any and every circumstances Sir Sam must be completely overshadowed by Sir Arthur Curry [Currie]'" In September 1919, Hughes in a speech to the Commons accused Currie of cowardice at the Second Battle of Ypres, claiming he fled in abject terror from his command post when he saw the yellow cloud of chlorine gas floating across no-man's land. On 16 June 1920, Hughes in another speech before the House said that Currie's military reputation was "propaganda" and there were dozens of officers who "are regarded throughout the length and breadth of this country as infinitely superior to General Sir Arthur Currie as a general or as a gentleman". Currie never responded publicly to these attacks, out of the fear that Hughes might reveal that he had stolen $10,000 from his regiment in Victoria, but he was greatly wounded and hurt.

== Death ==
In the summer of 1921, Hughes was informed by his doctors that he had only weeks to live. He returned to his home in the forests of Victoria County, which had been built to resemble a luxurious hunting lodge. On his deathbed, a Methodist minister came to offer solace, only to be told by the ever combative Hughes: "Don't you bother about me. Pretty soon I'll be sitting on the right hand of God and I'll be able to arrange things all right enough."

Sam Hughes died of pernicious anaemia, aged sixty-eight, in August 1921, and was survived by his son, Garnet Hughes, who served in the First World War, and his grandson, Samuel Hughes, who was a field historian in the Second World War and later a judge. On 26 August 1921, his funeral in Lindsay became the largest ever in the town, being attended by 20,000 people. To honour "Lindsay's foremost citizen", his coffin was carried by six veterans down the main street of Lindsay together with 45th Victoria Regiment, who marched to the somber tunes of drums and bagpipes. At the Riverside Cemetery, Hughes's coffin was placed into the earth while bugler Arthur Rhodes winner of the Military Medal played The Last Post and artillery guns fired 15 salutes. He and his wife are buried together.

== Awards and decorations ==
Ribbon bars of Sam Hughes

Knight Commander of the Order of the Bath	1915
Queen Victoria Diamond Jubilee Medal	1897
King George V Coronation Medal	1911
Canada General Service Medal	*Fenian Raid 1870
Queen's South Africa Medal	*Cape Colony; *Orange Free State
Colonial Auxiliary Forces Officers' Decoration	

== Plaques ==
A memorial plaque dedicated to the memory of Sam Hughes was erected in front of the Victoria Park Armoury building in Lindsay, Ontario. It reads:

Soldier, journalist, imperialist and Member of Parliament for Lindsay, Ontario from 1892 to 1921, Sam Hughes helped to create a distinctively Canadian Army. As Minister of Militia and Defence (1911–1916) he raised the Canadian Expeditionary Force which fought in World War I, and was knighted for his services. Disagreements with his colleagues and subordinates forced his retirement from the Cabinet in 1916."

Sir Sam Hughes is also listed on the WW1 Memorial Cenotaph in front of the Lindsay Public Library.

== Archives ==
There is a Sir Sam Hughes and Family collection at Library and Archives Canada.

== Electoral record ==
1891 Canadian federal election: Victoria North
Party	Candidate	Votes	%	±%
Liberal	John Augustus Barron	1,614	53.34	
Liberal-Conservative	Sam Hughes	1,412	46.66	

By-election: On Mr. Barron being unseated on petition, 11 February 1892: Victoria North
Party	Candidate	Votes	%	±%
Liberal-Conservative	HUGHES, Samuel	elected		
Liberal	BARRON, John Augustus			

1896 Canadian federal election: Victoria North
Party	Candidate	Votes	%	±%
Liberal-Conservative	Samuel Hughes	1,715		
Liberal	R.J. McLaughlin	1,464		
McCarthyite	J.H. Delemere	338		

1900 Canadian federal election: Victoria North
Party	Candidate	Votes	%	±%
Liberal-Conservative	Samuel Hughes	1,546		
Liberal	John McKay	1,417		

== See also ==
- Canadian Aviation Corps
- Nickle Resolution – a policy in place since 1917 that occurred after Hughes' knighthood

== Notes ==
10th Canadian Ministry (1917–1920) – Unionist cabinet of Robert Borden
Cabinet post (1)
Predecessor	Office	Successor
Frederick William Borden	Minister of Militia and Defence; 1911–1916	Albert Edward Kemp
Parliament of Canada
Preceded by John Augustus Barron	Member of Parliament from Victoria North; 1892–1904	Succeeded by district abolished in 1903
Preceded by None	Member of Parliament from Victoria; 1904–1921	Succeeded by John Jabez Thurston
