= Joseph Staples =

Canadian politician

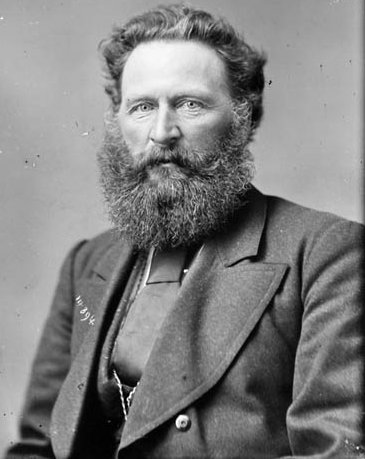

Member of the Canadian Parliament for Victoria North
- In office 1872–1874
- Preceded by: John Morison
- Succeeded by: James Maclennan

Personal details
- Born: 1826 Cavan, Upper Canada
- Died: March 21, 1878 (aged 51–52)
- Party: Conservative
- Relations: Grace MacInnis, great-niece

Joseph Staples (1826 – March 21, 1878) was a Canadian political figure. He represented Victoria North in the House of Commons of Canada as a Conservative member from 1872 to 1874.

He was born in Cavan, Durham County, Upper Canada. Staples was a captain in the militia. He served as reeve for Bexley Township and was warden for Victoria County from 1866 to 1868 and 1870 to 1872. In 1852, he married a Miss Montgomery. Staples was an unsuccessful candidate for the provincial seat in 1867. He defeated the former member, John Morison, to win the federal seat in 1872. Staples died in Bexley Township at the age of 52.

His great-niece Winona Grace MacInnis also served in the House of Commons.
