= Charles Lamb (politician) =

Canadian politician (1891–1965)

Charles Wesley Lamb

Member of Parliament for Victoria
- In office April 8, 1963 – July 12, 1965
- Preceded by: Clayton Hodgson
- Succeeded by: William C. Scott

Personal details
- Born: 1891 Prince Albert, Ontario
- Died: 12 July 1965 (age c. 74)
- Party: Progressive Conservative
- Profession: auctioneer, businessman

Charles Wesley Lamb (1891 – 12 July 1965) was a Progressive Conservative party member of the House of Commons of Canada. He was born in Prince Albert, Ontario and became an auctioneer and businessman by career.

He was first elected at the Victoria riding in the 1963 general election, but died in office before completing his term in the 26th Parliament.
