= Bruce McNevin =

Canadian politician

Member of Parliament for Victoria
- In office October 1935 – June 1945
- Preceded by: Thomas Hubert Stinson
- Succeeded by: Clayton Hodgson

Personal details
- Born: Thomas Bruce McNevin; 6 February 1884 Ops Township, Ontario
- Died: 2 March 1951 (aged 67) Omemee, Ontario
- Party: Liberal
- Spouse(s): Edith Dundas m. 22 December 1909
- Profession: farmer

Thomas Bruce McNevin (6 February 1884 – 2 March 1951) was a Liberal party member of the House of Commons of Canada. He was born in Ops Township, Ontario and became a farmer by career.

McNevin attended public and continuation schools in Victoria County, Ontario. In Lindsay, he became president of the Farmers Union Insurance Company.

He was first elected to Parliament at the Victoria, Ontario riding in the 1935 general election after an unsuccessful campaign there as a Progressive party candidate in 1925. He was re-elected in 1940 then defeated by Clayton Hodgson of the Progressive Conservatives in 1945. McNevin was also unsuccessful in unseating Hodgson in 1949.

McNevin died at Omemee, Ontario on 2 March 1951 survived by his wife (Edith Dundas) and two daughters.
