= Rideau Hall Rebels =

Canadian ice hockey team

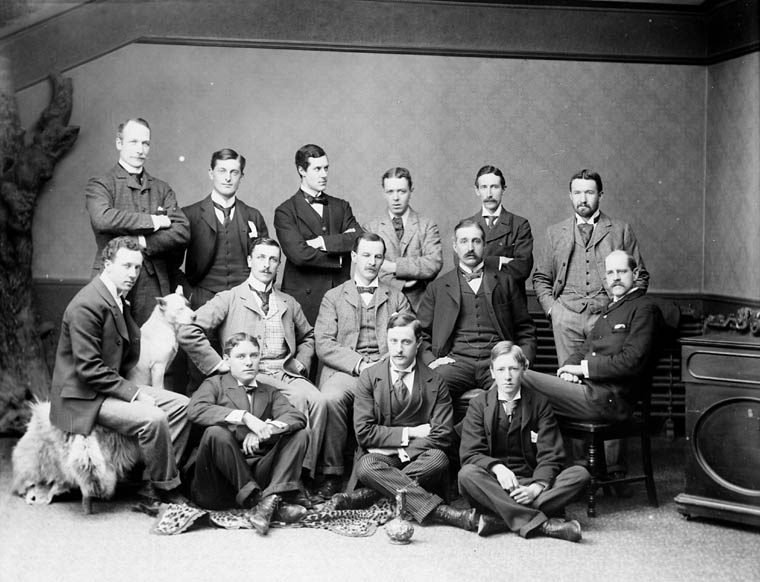
Rideau Hall Rebels, 1894

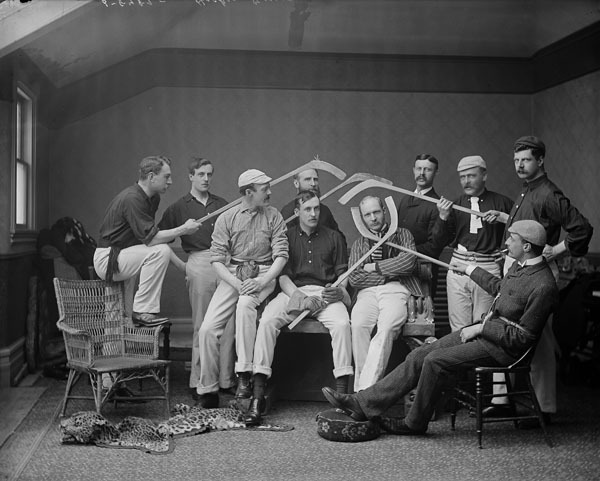
Sons of Lord Stanley and the Rideau Hall Rebels with Mic-Mac hockey sticks. James Creighton is seated third from left, Judge Barron is seated centre right with the sticks around his head.

The Rideau Hall Rebels or, by its full name, the Vice-Regal and Parliamentary Hockey Club was one of the first ice hockey teams in Canada. The team was based out of Ottawa, Ontario, Canada, and named after Rideau Hall, a Canadian governmental building, the residence of the Governor General. This team introduced ice hockey to then Canadian Governor General Lord Stanley, who would later donate the Stanley Cup championship trophy.

Organized by James Creighton in 1884, and captained by John Augustus Barron, the team consisted of young Canadian parliamentarians and government 'aides-de camp' including Mr. Creighton and Edward and Arthur Stanley, sons of Lord Stanley. This group of players would travel to matches around Ontario in the Governor-General's private rail-car.

== See also ==
- Ice hockey in Ottawa
