= John Jabez Thurston =

Canadian politician

Member of Parliament for Victoria, Ontario
- In office December 1921 – September 1926
- Preceded by: Sam Hughes
- Succeeded by: Thomas Hubert Stinson

Personal details
- Born: John Jabez Thurston; 11 October 1888 Fenelon Township, Ontario, Canada
- Died: 8 January 1960 (aged 71)
- Party: independent
- Profession: farmer

John Jabez Thurston (11 October 1888 – 8 January 1960) was an independent member of the House of Commons of Canada. He was born in Fenelon Township, Ontario and became a farmer.

He was elected to Parliament at the Victoria, Ontario riding in the 1921 general election. After serving his only term, the 14th Canadian Parliament, Thurston did not seek re-election in the 1925 vote and was succeeded by Thomas Hubert Stinson of the Conservatives. In the 1926 election, Thurston campaigned at Victoria riding under the Progressive party but was defeated by Stinson.

== Electoral record ==
1926 Canadian federal election: Victoria
| Party | Candidate | Votes | % | ±% |
|---|---|---|---|---|
| Conservative | Thomas Hubert Stinson | 9,070 | | |
| Progressive | John Jabez Thurston | 6,004 | | |

1921 Canadian federal election: Victoria
| Party | Candidate | Votes | % | ±% |
|---|---|---|---|---|
| Independent | John Jabez Thurston | 8,019 | | |
| Conservative | Thomas Hubert Stinson | 7,816 | | |
