= Bondy (disambiguation) =

Bondy is a commune in Bondy Canton, Seine-Saint-Denis, Île-de-France, France; a suburb of Paris

Bondy may also refer to:

== Places ==
- Canton of Bondy, Seine-Saint-Denis, Île-de-France, France
- Bondy station, Bondy, France; a rail station

== People ==
=== Lords of Bondy ===
- Pierre-Marie Taillepied, Comte de Bondy (1766–1847), French politician

=== Persons with the surname ===
- A. A. Bondy, U.S. musician
- Beulah Bondy(1888–1981), U.S. actress
- Curt W. Bondy (1894–1972), German psychologist
- Egon Bondy (1930–2007), Czech philosopher
- Emma Ritter-Bondy (1838–1894), UK musician
- François Bondy (1915–2003), Swiss journalist
- James Bondy (born 1965), Canadian entertainer
- John Adrian Bondy (born 1944), UK mathematician
- Joseph Bondy, dit Douaire (1770–1832), Quebec merchant and politician
- Louis Bondy (1910–1993), UK politician
- Luc Bondy (1948–2015), Swiss director
- Melissa Bondy, U.S. epidemiologist
- Oscar Bondy (1870–1944), Austrian art collector
- Ottilie Bondy (1832–1921), Austrian activist
- Ruth Bondy (1923–2017), Israeli journalist
- Sebastián Salazar Bondy (1925–1965), Peruvian playwright
- Steven C. Bondy, U.S. diplomat
- Walter Bondy (1880–1940), German artist
- William Bondy (1870–1964), U.S. judge
- Yak Bondy (born 1962), UK music producer

=== Persons with the given name, stagename, nickname ===
- Bondy Chiu Hok-yee (Chinese: 趙學而, Chiu Hok-yee; born 1971), Hong Kong singer-actress
- Bondy Long, U.S. NASCAR team owner
- Bondy, a pseudonym of Gene Bilbrew (1923-1974), U.S. artist

== Other uses ==
- Bondy's theorem, on a bound of how many elements are needed to distinguish sets apart

== See also ==
- The Von Bondies, U.S. rock band
- Bondie (disambiguation)
- Bondi (disambiguation)
