= Bondi (name) =

Bondi or Bondy is a surname. Notable people with the surname include:

- August Bondi (1833–1907), Austrian-American abolitionist
- Beulah Bondi (1888–1981), American actress
- Curt W. Bondy (1894–1972), German psychologist and social educator
- Egon Bondy, born Zbyněk Fišer (1930–2007), Czech philosopher and poet
- François Bondy (1915–2003), Swiss journalist and novelist
- Hermann Bondi (1919–2005), Anglo-Austrian mathematician and physicist
- John Adrian Bondy, British-Canadian mathematician
- Jonas Bondi (1804–1874), German-American rabbi and newspaper editor
- Joseph Bondy (1863–1945), American lawyer, politician, and military officer
- Luc Bondy (1948–2015), Swiss theater and opera director
- Pam Bondi (born 1965), United States Attorney General (2025–2026)
- Renato Rafael Bondi (born 1981), Brazilian footballer
- Simon Bondi (1774–1816), lexicographer
- Vic Bondi, of American band Articles of Faith
- William Bondy (1870–1964), a longtime federal judge of the Southern District of New York
- Yak Bondy (born 1962), American music producer
- Bondy, a pseudonym of Gene Bilbrew (1923–1974), American cartoonist and fetish artist

== See also ==
- Bondi (disambiguation)
- Bondy (disambiguation)
