= Napierville (disambiguation) =

Napierville is a municipality in Quebec, Canada.

Napierville may also refer to:

- Napierville (federal electoral district)
- Napierville (provincial electoral district)

== See also ==
- Naperville
