= Eugène Lafontaine =

Canadian politician (1857–1935)

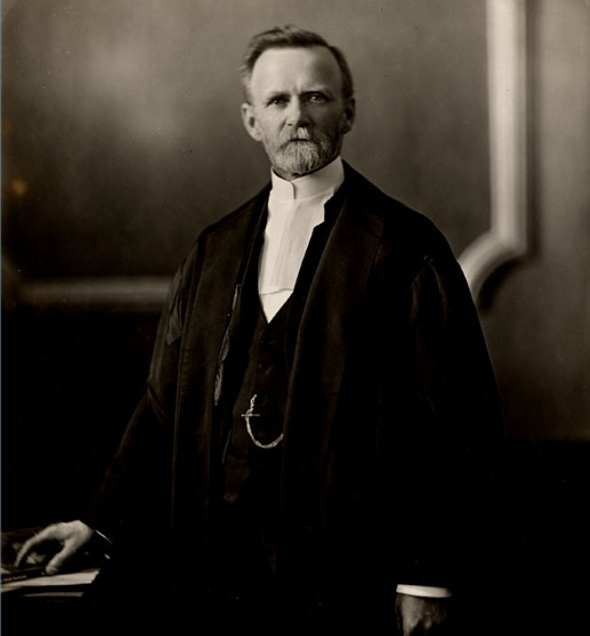

Member of the Legislative Assembly of Quebec for Napierville
- In office 1886–1890
- Preceded by: François-Xavier Paradis
- Succeeded by: Louis Sainte-Marie

Personal details
- Born: November 26, 1857 Saint-Édouard, Canada East
- Died: April 21, 1935 (aged 77) Montreal, Quebec
- Resting place: Notre Dame des Neiges Cemetery
- Party: Liberal
- Relations: Laurent-David Lafontaine, father Louis-Joseph Moll, father-in-law

Pierre Eugène Lafontaine (November 26, 1857 – April 21, 1935) was a lawyer, educator, judge and political figure in Quebec. He represented Napierville in the Legislative Assembly of Quebec from 1886 to 1890 as a Liberal.

He was born in Saint-Édouard, Canada East, the son of Laurent-David Lafontaine and Edwige Singer. Lafontaine was educated at the Collège de Montréal and the Université Laval at Montreal. He was admitted to the Quebec bar in 1879 and practised in Montreal with Raymond Préfontaine and then Frédéric Liguori Béique.

In 1880, he married Elmire, the daughter of Louis-Joseph Moll. He was named Queen's Counsel in 1899. Lafontaine served as president of the Montreal Catholic School Board from 1919 to 1928. He was professor of civil law at the Université Laval and was dean of the faculty of law from 1922 to 1930. Lafontaine was named judge in the Quebec Superior Court for Montreal district in 1906 and in the Court of King's Bench in 1922. He retired from the bench in 1932. He died three years later in Montreal at the age of 77 and was buried in Notre Dame des Neiges Cemetery.

Lafontaine was the author of Droit romain published in 1912 and contributed to la Revue légale and Thémis.
