= Laurent-David Lafontaine =

Canadian politician

Member of the Legislative Assembly of Quebec for Napierville
- In office 1870–1881
- Preceded by: Pierre Benoit
- Succeeded by: François-Xavier Paradis

Personal details
- Born: August 10, 1823 Saint-Philippe, Lower Canada
- Died: February 20, 1892 (aged 68) Montreal, Quebec
- Party: Liberal

Laurent-David Lafontaine (August 10, 1823 – February 20, 1892) was a physician and political figure in Quebec. He represented Napierville in the Legislative Assembly of Quebec from 1870 to 1881 as a Liberal.

He was born in Saint-Philippe, Lower Canada, the son of François Lafontaine and Marie Coupal, and was educated at the Collège de Montréal. He qualified to practice as a doctor in 1846 and set up practice in Saint-Jean-sur-Richelieu and Saint-Édouard. Lafontaine was also agent for the seigneury of Saint-Georges. He was mayor of Saint-Édouard, warden for Napierville County and secretary-treasurer for the Saint-Édouard school board. He served as Liberal Party whip in 1881. Lafontaine was married three times: to Cécile Daigneau in 1850, to Edwidge Singer in 1857 and to Clémence Lemay, dit Delorme in 1868. He died at Montréal at the age of 68.

His son Eugène also served in the Quebec assembly.
