= Gaston Bodart =

Austrian statistician

- Born: Gaston Bodart; 1867; Vienna, Austria
- Died: 1940 (aged 72–73)
- Education: LLD.
- Occupations: Military historian Government official
- Title: Assistant Imperial and Royal Commissioner
- Spouse: Hedwig Neuhold

Gaston Bodart (1867–1940) was a military historian, statistician, and government official. He was born in 1867 in Vienna, Austria. He achieved distinction for his analysis of casualties of war in Austria's wars, from the Thirty Years War to the Russo-Japanese War in 1905 and for many years his studies of military casualties remained the standard in the literature. As an assistant commissioner of the Imperial and Royal Commission, he also helped to organize Austria's presentations at various world fairs and exhibitions.

== Career ==
Trained as a lawyer, Bodart entered government service. By 1894, he was an assistant commissioner in the Imperial and Royal Central Commission. He published, in that year, Erziehung (en: Upbringing), with Ottilie Bondy, Henry Kautsch, and Georg Adam Scheid.

In his capacity at the Imperial Central Commission, Bodart helped to expand the collection of the Vienna Bibliotheque. Bodart also traveled extensively. He visited the United States as part of the organizing committee for the Austrian exhibit at the 1893 World's Columbian Exposition. Two years later, he was part of an Austrian delegation to examine the United States Commission on Fisheries exhibits. In 1907, he traveled from Genoa to New York City, and from there via train to Milwaukee and Chicago, to visit the World's Pure Food Exposition (1907).

=== Military historian ===
In 1908, Bodart published his Militär-historisches Kriegs-Lexikon (1618–1905), in which he examined several thousand battles of the early modern era. Drawing on this, Bodart's most famous work, Losses of life in modern wars, Austria-Hungary; France, (1916), identified the casualties of war in all of Austria and Austria-Hungary's wars the Thirty Years War, in the early 17th century, through the Russo-Japanese War, in the early 20th century. In this volume he compiled participants and casualties from more than 1500 battles, and he posited that wartime casualties led to stagnation and loss of creative force. His interest in the statistical implications of casualties in wartime linked with those of Vernon Lyman Kellogg; the volume was published in English in the series Military Selection and Race Deterioration, funded by the Carnegie Endowment for International Peace, Division of Economics and History.

In his assessment of Austria's wars with France, 1805–1815, which he prepared in 1913, Bodart wrote of Napoleon Bonaparte, "No other man has sacrificed so many human victims to the god of war as did Napoleon I; no other man has sowed death broadcast on such a scale; no other commander ever cared less for his soldiers than he." His manuscript of Die Menschen-Verluste Osterreich-Ungarns im Weltkriege 1914–1918 remained unpublished.

== Selected publications ==
- Losses of life in modern wars, Austria-Hungary; France, by Gaston Bodart, Series, Military selection and race deterioration, by Vernon Lyman Kellogg; ed. by Harald Westergaard ... Oxford, The Clarendon Press; London, New York [etc.] H. Milford, 1916. Download
- (in German) Militär-historisches Kriegs-Lexikon (1618–1905). Wien und Leipzig, C. W. Stern, 1908. Download
- (in German) Kämpfe und Entwicklung der russischen Marine seit ihrer Entstehung bis heute: 1704 – 1904. Wien: Braumüller in Komm., 1904.
- (in German) Die für's Vaterland gestorbenen Generale und Admirale der kriegführenden Staaten: 1612–1905 Wien [u.a.] : Stern, 1909.
- (in German) Erziehung, Ottilie Bondy, Gaston Bodart, Henry Kautsch, Georg Adam Scheid. Wien : K.K. Central Commission, 1894.

== Family ==
Bodart was born in 1867 in Vienna to a family of Belgian descent. Bodart married Hedwig Neuhold, and they lived in Hart bei Gloggnitz. He received the Order of Franz Joseph (Knights Cross), and the Golden Service Cross with Crown, plus several foreign orders. He died in 1940.

== Sources ==
=== References ===
- (in German) Broucek, Peter and Kurt Peball. Geschichte der österreichischen Militärhistoriographie. Köln [u.a.]: Böhlau, 2000. ISBN 3-412-05700-2.
- Cecil, Hugh P. and Peter Liddle. Facing Armageddon: the First World War Experienced. London: Leo Cooper, 1996, ISBN 0-85052-506-3.
- (in German) Lueger, Karl. Die Gemeinde-Verwaltung der Stadt Wien im Jahre 1904. Wien, Gerlack & Wiedling, 1906.
- The official directory of the World's Columbian exposition, May 1st to October 30th, 1893. A reference book of exhibitors and exhibits, and of the officers and members of the World's Columbian Commission. Chicago, W.B. Conkey Co., 1893.
- Passenger Manifest. SS Kaiser Wilhelm II. Year: 1893; Microfilm serial: M237; Microfilm roll: M237_603; Line: 1; Page Number: 6. Passenger Lists of Vessels Arriving at New York, New York, 1820–1897; (National Archives Microfilm Publication M237, 675 rolls); Records of the U.S. Customs Service, Record Group 36; National Archives, Washington, D.C.
- Passenger lists, Year: 1907; Microfilm serial: T715; Microfilm roll: T715_884; Line: 8; Page Number: 81. Oceana, sailed from Genoa Italy, to New York, arrived 4 May 1907.
- United States Bureau of Fisheries. Report of the Commissioner - United States Commission of Fish, part 20. Washington, Commission; U.S. Govt. Print. Office, (1896).
- (in German) "Wiener Gesellschaft." Adressbuch der Gesellschaft Wiens und der österreichischen Kronländer, 1913
- Worldcat. Losses of Life in modern wars, Austria Hungary and France. Gaston Bodart, L.L. D. Military Selection and race deterioration series, by Vernon Lyman Kellogg. Edited by Harald Westergaard, Oxford, Clarendon Press, 1916
