= Napierville (federal electoral district) =

Former federal electoral district in Quebec, Canada

Quebec electoral district

Defunct federal electoral district
- Legislature: House of Commons
- District created: 1867
- District abolished: 1892
- First contested: 1867
- Last contested: 1891

Demographics
- Census division(s): Montérégie
- Census subdivision(s): Napierville, Saint-Patrick-de-Sherrington, Saint-Cyprien-de-Napierville, Saint-Édouard, Saint-Michel-Archange, Saint-Rémi

Napierville (French pronunciation: [napjɛʁvil]) was a federal electoral district in Quebec, Canada, that was represented in the House of Commons of Canada from 1867 to 1892.

It was created by the British North America Act, 1867, and was abolished in 1892 when it was merged into Laprairie—Napierville riding.

== Members of Parliament ==
This riding has elected the following members of Parliament:

Parliament	Years	Member	Party
Napierville
1st	1867–1872	Sixte Coupal dit la Reine	Liberal
2nd	1872–1873	Antoine-Aimé Dorion	Liberal
2nd	1873–1874	Antoine-Aimé Dorion	Liberal
3rd	1874–1874	Antoine-Aimé Dorion	Liberal
3rd	1874–1875	Sixte Coupal dit la Reine	Liberal
3rd	1875–1878	Sixte Coupal dit la Reine	Liberal
4th	1878–1882	Sixte Coupal dit la Reine	Liberal
5th	1882–1887	Médéric Catudal	Liberal
6th	1887–1890	Louis Sainte-Marie	Liberal
6th	1890–1891	François-Xavier Paradis	Conservative
7th	1891–1896	Dominique Monet	Liberal
Riding dissolved itno Laprairie—Napierville

== Election results ==
1867 Canadian federal election
Party	Candidate	Votes
Liberal	Sixte Coupal dit la Reine	878
Unknown	M. Laviolette	344
Eligible voters		2,018
Source: Canadian Parliamentary Guide, 1871

1872 Canadian federal election
Party	Candidate	Votes
Liberal	Antoine-Aimé Dorion	631
Liberal	Sixte Coupal dit la Reine	572
Source: Canadian Elections Database

By-election on 27 November 1873; On Dorion being appointed Minister of Justice and Attorney General
Party	Candidate	Votes
Liberal	Antoine-Aimé Dorion	acclaimed

1874 Canadian federal election
Party	Candidate	Votes
Liberal	Antoine-Aimé Dorion	731
Liberal	Sixte Coupal dit la Reine	542
Source: lop.parl.ca

By-election on 4 August 1874; On Dorion's elevation to the Chief Justiceship of Quebec
Party	Candidate	Votes
Liberal	Sixte Coupal dit la Reine	618
Unknown	Antoine Goyer	609

By-election on 19 June 1875; On Coupal being unseated on petition
Party	Candidate	Votes
Liberal	Sixte Coupal dit la Reine	721
Unknown	Louis Bédard	637

1878 Canadian federal election
Party	Candidate	Votes
Liberal	Sixte Coupal dit la Reine	749
Unknown	J.E. Bureau	617

1882 Canadian federal election
Party	Candidate	Votes
Liberal	Médéric Catudal	765
Liberal	Sixte Coupal dit la Reine	618

1887 Canadian federal election
Party	Candidate	Votes
Liberal	Louis Sainte-Marie	908
Conservative	François-Xavier Paradis	687

By-election on 9 December 1890
Party	Candidate	Votes
Conservative	François-Xavier Paradis	acclaimed

1891 Canadian federal election
Party	Candidate	Votes
Liberal	Dominique Monet	817
Conservative	François-Xavier Paradis	799

== See also ==
- List of Canadian electoral districts
- Historical federal electoral districts of Canada
