= Bondi Beach (disambiguation) =

Bondi Beach is a beach located in the suburb of the same name in Sydney, New South Wales.

Bondi Beach may also refer to:

- Bondi Beach (horse) (foaled 2012), an Irish Thoroughbred racehorse
- Bondi Beach (Whiteley), a 1992 painting by Brett Whiteley

== See also ==
- Bondi (disambiguation)
- 2025 Bondi Beach shooting
