= Bondy's theorem =

Bounds the number of elements needed to distinguish the sets in a family of sets

In mathematics, Bondy's theorem is a bound on the number of elements needed to distinguish the sets in a family of sets from each other. It belongs to the field of combinatorics, and is named after John Adrian Bondy, who published it in 1972.

== Statement ==
The theorem is as follows:

Let X be a set with n elements and let A_{1}, A_{2}, ..., A_{n} be distinct subsets of X. Then there exists a subset S of X with n − 1 elements such that the sets A_{i} ∩ S are all distinct.

In other words, if we have a 0-1 matrix with n rows and n columns such that each row is distinct, we can remove one column such that the rows of the resulting n × (n − 1) matrix are distinct.

== Example ==
Consider the 4 × 4 matrix

$$\begin{bmatrix}
1&1&0&1\\
0&1&0&1\\
0&0&1&1\\
0&1&1&0
\end{bmatrix}$$

where all rows are pairwise distinct. If we delete, for example, the first column, the resulting matrix

$$\begin{bmatrix}
1&0&1\\
1&0&1\\
0&1&1\\
1&1&0
\end{bmatrix}$$

no longer has this property: the first row is identical to the second row. Nevertheless, by Bondy's theorem we know that we can always find a column that can be deleted without introducing any identical rows. In this case, we can delete the third column: all rows of the 3 × 4 matrix

$$\begin{bmatrix}
1&1&1\\
0&1&1\\
0&0&1\\
0&1&0
\end{bmatrix}$$

are distinct. Another possibility would have been deleting the fourth column.

== Learning theory application ==
From the perspective of computational learning theory, Bondy's theorem can be rephrased as follows:

Let C be a concept class over a finite domain X. Then there exists a subset S of X with the size at most |C| − 1 such that S is a witness set for every concept in C.

This implies that every finite concept class C has its teaching dimension bounded by |C| − 1.
