= Médéric Catudal =

Canadian politician

MP for Napierville
- In office February 8, 1883 – January 15, 1887
- Preceded by: Sixte Coupal dit la Reine
- Succeeded by: Louis Sainte-Marie

Personal details
- Born: November 24, 1856 Napierville, Canada East
- Died: May 8, 1939 (aged 82)
- Party: Liberal
- Occupation: Agent

Médéric Catudal (November 24, 1856 – May 8, 1939) was a Canadian politician, who represented the electoral district of Napierville in the House of Commons of Canada from February 8, 1883 to January 15, 1887. He was a member of the Liberal Party.

Catudal was born in Napierville, Canada East, the son of Toussaint Catudal and Marie-Marceline Poissant. He married Marie-Louise Clara Paquin in the United States on May 15, 1884, and emigrated from Canada to the United States sometime after the end of his term in Parliament. The 1900 US census shows that he was living in Campbell, Nebraska. By 1910, the US Census shows that he and his family were living at 1126 Grandview Street in Los Angeles, California.

1882 Canadian federal election: Napierville
Party	Candidate	Votes
Liberal	Médéric Catudal	765
Liberal	Sixte Coupal dit la Reine	618
