= Bondie =

Bondie may refer to:

== Places ==
- Bondie Reserve (Île-à-l'Ail Indian Reservation), Indiana, USA; see List of historical Indian reservations in the United States
- Bondie, Taylor, Michigan, USA; a tributary of the Ecorse River

== People ==
=== Persons with the given name, nickname, stagename ===
- Ashlee Bond (born 1985; nicknamed "Bondie"), Israeli equestrian
- Bondie Dietaiuti (13th century), Florentine poet

=== Persons with the surname ===
- Edith Bondie (1918–2005), U.S. basketmaker
- Celeste Bondie, U.S. politician for Green Party of Michigan
- Jason Von Bondie, fighter awarded at the 2004 NME Awards; see List of NME Award winners

== Other uses ==
- "Bondie" (song), a 1999 song by Joëlle Ursull

== See also ==
- The Von Bondies, U.S. rock band
- Après Bondié, C'est la Ter (Dominica), see Religion in national symbols
- Bondi (disambiguation)
- Bondy (disambiguation)
- Bond (disambiguation)
