= Roch Lanctôt =

Canadian politician (1866–1929)

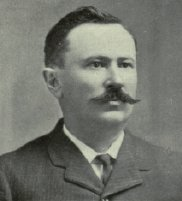

Member of the Canadian Parliament for Laprairie—Napierville
- In office 1904–1929
- Preceded by: Dominique Monet
- Succeeded by: Vincent Dupuis

Personal details
- Born: January 30, 1866 Saint-Constant, Canada East
- Died: May 30, 1929 (aged 63)
- Party: Liberal

Roch Lanctôt (January 30, 1866 – May 30, 1929) was a Canadian politician.

Born in Saint-Constant, Canada East, Lanctôt was educated at the University of Ottawa. A farmer by occupation, he was first elected to the House of Commons of Canada for the electoral district of Laprairie—Napierville in the general elections of 1904. A Liberal, he was re-elected in 1908, 1911, 1917, 1921, 1925, and 1926. He died in office in 1929.
