= Rivière de la Tortue (Delson) =

Watercourse in Canada

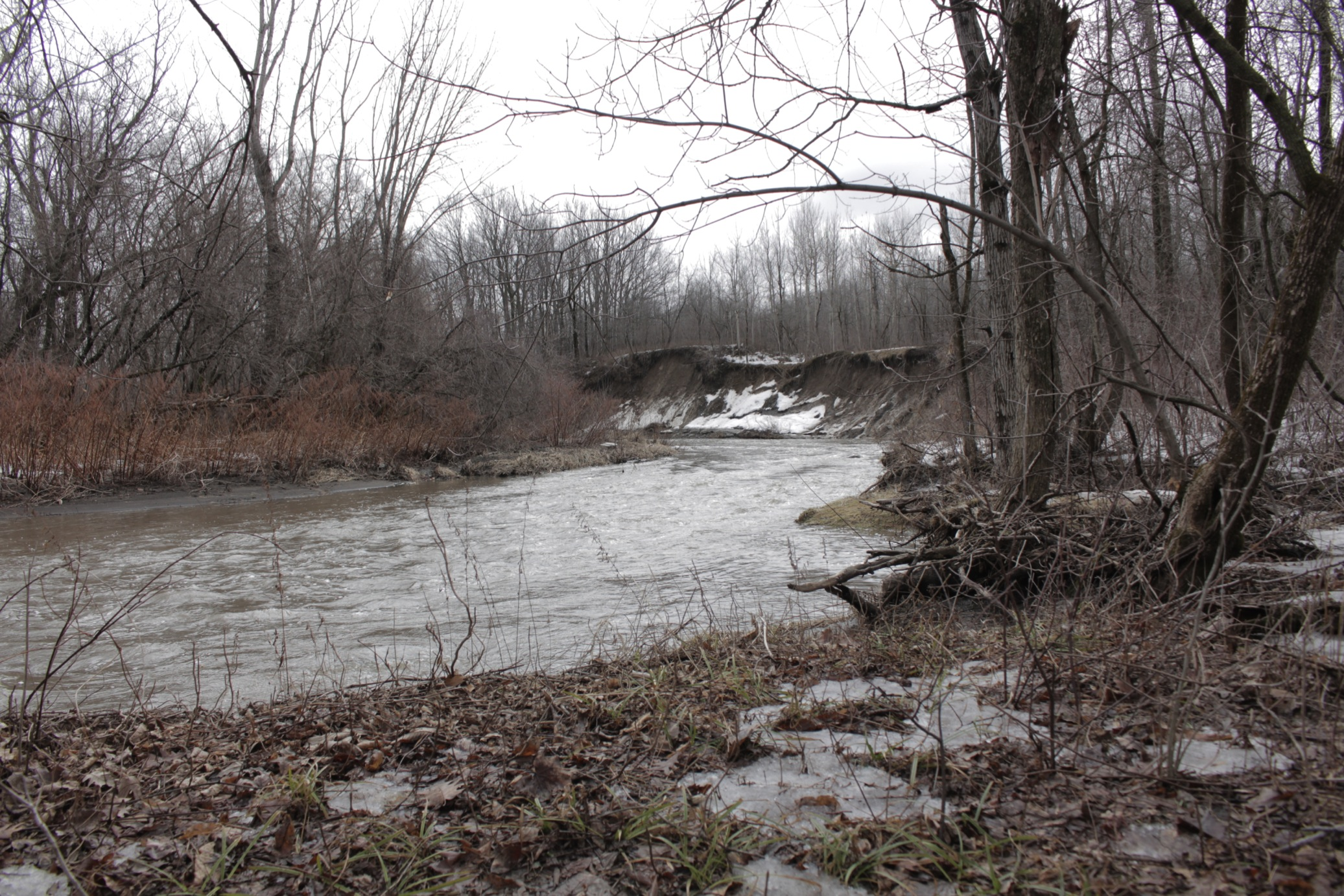
- Rivière de la Tortue

Location
- Country: Canada
- Province: Quebec
- Region: Montérégie
- MRC: Roussillon Regional County Municipality

Physical characteristics
- Source: Various agricultural streams
  - location: Saint-Patrice-de-Sherrington
  - coordinates: 45.145542°N 73.571176°W
  - elevation: 20
- Mouth: St. Lawrence Seaway
  - location: Delson
  - coordinates: 45.40166°N 73.53638°W
  - elevation: 20 m (66 ft)
- Length: 36.6 km (22.7 mi)

Basin features
- Tributaries
  - left: (upstream) Lasaline stream, Saint-Michel stream, Lazure stream, Faille stream
  - right: (upstream)

The rivière de la Tortue (English: Turtle River) is a tributary of the south shore of the St. Lawrence River, flowing in the administrative region of Montérégie, southwest of the province of Quebec, in Canada. This river flows in the Regional County Municipality (RCM) of:

- Les Jardins-de-Napierville Regional County Municipality: in the municipalities of Saint-Patrice-de-Sherrington and Saint-Édouard;
- Roussillon Regional County Municipality: in the municipalities of Saint-Mathieu, Delson and Candiac.

The river surface is generally frozen from mid-December to the end of March. Safe traffic on the ice is generally from late December to early March. The water level of the river varies with the seasons and the precipitation.

== Geography ==
The main hydrographic slopes neighboring the rivière de la Tortue are:

- north side: St. Lawrence Seaway, St. Lawrence River;
- east side: Saint-André stream, Saint Jacques River (Roussillon);
- south side: Laffite stream, Acadia River;
- west side: Saint-Pierre River (Saint-Régis River tributary);

The rivière de la Tortue originates from a set of agricultural streams draining the area 3.8 km (2.4 mi) southwest of the village of Saint-Patrice-de-Sherrington, north of Laffite stream, north -west of the side of Acadia River and north of the hamlet of Barrington.

From Saint-Patrice-de-Sherrington, the rivière de la Tortue flows north into agricultural land. In its northward course, the Tortue River passes west of the village of Saint-Patrice-de-Sherrington, recovering the water from the agricultural streams Lazure, Saint-Michel and Provost. The river flows through the heart of the village of Saint-Édouard, then collects the waters of the Boulerice-Yelle stream along (on the west side) autoroute 15 over a 7.3 km (4.5 mi) segment. Then the river turns west and goes to the village of Saint-Mathieu where it collects the Faille stream on its left bank near the community center.

From the village of Saint-Mathieu, the river flows straight north along (east side) the railway and passing west of the hamlet Val- Wooded. At the height of the industrial zone, the river begins to meander; what she will do until the end of her journey.

From the industrial zone, the river continues its course to the north, collecting the water from the Isabelle and Lasaline streams, passes under the autoroute 30 very close (east side) of the road of iron. Then the river enters from the south into the town of Delson where it winds north. The river continues its course passing in Candiac until its mouth.

The mouth of the rivière de la Tortue is located on the south shore of the St. Lawrence Seaway, downstream of the Côte-Sainte-Catherine lock, 3 km (1.9 mi) downstream of the mouth of the Saint-Pierre River (Saint-Régis River tributary).

The rivière de la Tortue flows more or less in parallel (on the east side) to the Saint-Pierre River (Saint-Régis River tributary). It flows for 24 km (15 mi) between the source and the village of Saint-Mathieu; then 12.6 km (7.8 mi) to its mouth. Because of its low slope, the Tortoise river is favorable to get out of its bed during flooding.

== Toponymy ==
The toponym "Rivière de la Tortue" was formalized on December 5, 1968, at the Commission de toponymie du Québec.

== See also ==
- List of rivers of Quebec
