= Hanns von Gumppenberg =

German author

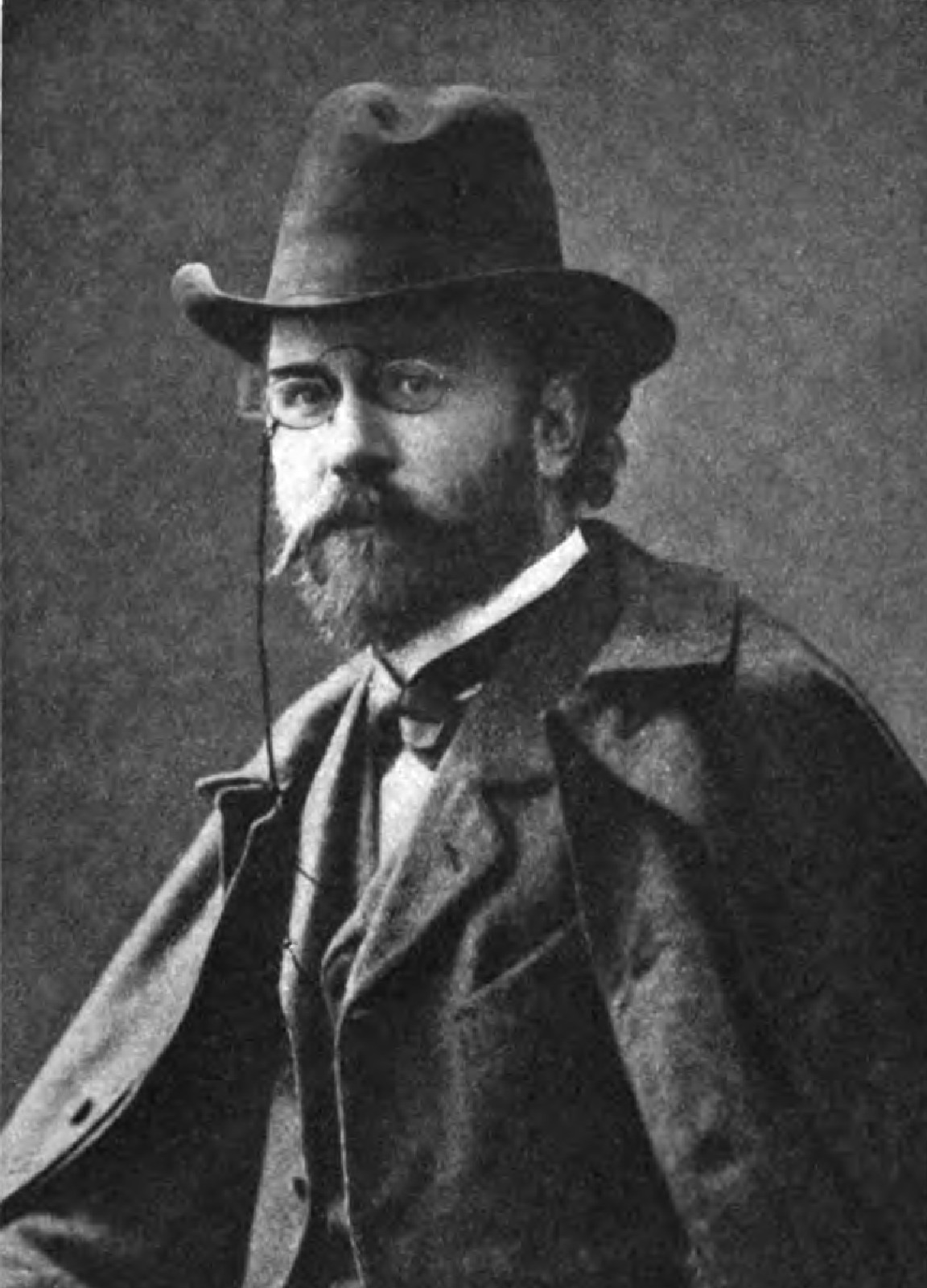
Hanns von Gumppenberg

Hanns Theodor Wilhelm Freiherr von Gumppenberg (4 December 1866 – 29 March 1928) was a German poet, translator, cabaret artist and theatre critic. He used the pseudonyms Jodok and Professor Immanuel Tiefbohrer.

== Life ==
Gumppenberg was born in 1866 in Landshut, the son of Karl Freiherr von Gumppenberg (1833–1893), a postal clerk from Bamberg and a scion of the original Bavarian noble family of Reichsfreiherren von Gumppenberg. His mother was Engelberta von Gumppenberg, née Sommer (1839–1920), daughter of a geographer.

Both the father and already the grandfather Wilhelm von Gumppenberg (Bavarian member of parliament, landowner and major) were active in literature. The father wrote mostly dialectal drama and poetry, the grandfather belletristic works and witty Punch and Judy plays.

Gumppenberg received an education at the Königlich Bayerische Pagerie in Munich, where he ventured his first attempts at poetry. After the page school and the Abitur at the Wilhelmsgymnasium München he took up studies in philosophy and literary history in Munich in 1885. For reasons of better livelihood, however, Gumppenberg decided three years later to take up legal studies. He eventually abandoned law studies to work as a freelance writer and journalist. In 1894, he married Charlotte Donnerstag (born 1870) in Berlin, who died in 1895.

Gumppenberg was theatre critic of the Münchner Neueste Nachrichten from 1901 to 1909. From 1910 to 1913, together with Alfred Auscher, he was editor of the new artistic-literary journal Light and Shadow. Wochenschrift für Schwarz-Weiß-Kunst und Dichtung. Afterwards he worked as an author and editor for the magazine Jugend until his death. From 1902 onwards, Gumppenberg also regularly worked as a translator of foreign poetry, for example Swedish poems by Bellman, Fröding and Karlfeldt.

After 1889, Gumppenberg moved in the circles of the Munich modernists, to which Michael Georg Conrad and his followers belonged first and foremost. Together with Georg Hoffmann, Julius Schaumberger and Otto Julius Bierbaum, he founded the Gesellschaft für modernes Leben in 1890. In 1897, he married Helene Bondy (1868–1954), the daughter of the factory owner Ignaz Bondy and the Austrian women's rights activist Ottilie Bondy, in his second marriage.

In 1901, under the pseudonym Jodok, he became a co-founder of the Munich cabaret Die Elf Scharfrichter as a writer of poetry and drama parodies. His parodistic work also eventually made him famous. Gumppenberg's collection of parodies Das Teutsche Dichterross, 1st edition 1901, went through a total of 14 editions. However, he remained unsuccessful with the main part of his work – mostly worldview and idea dramas.

The First World War and inflation brought Gumppenberg into financial difficulties and from 1922 he was also in poor health. On 29 March 1928 he died in Munich of a heart condition at the age of 61.

Gumppenberg's estate is housed in the Monacensia literary archive of the city of Munich.

== Work ==
- Thorwald. (Trauerspiel) München, 1888
- Apollo. (comedy) J. Lindauer, München 1890
- Das dritte Testament – Eine Offenbarung Gottes. Poesse, Munich 1891
- Deutsche Lyrik von Gestern
- Kritik des Wirklich-Seienden – Grundlagen zu einer Philosophie des Wirklich-Seienden. Verlagsabtheilung der deutschen Schriftstellergenossenschaft, Berlin 1892
- Alles und Nichts – Dichtung in 3 Abtheilungen und 12 Bildern. Baumert & Ronge, Großenhain und Leipzig: 1894
- Die Minnekönigin. (comedy) Reclam, Leipzig 1894
- Der fünfte Prophet. (novel) Verlag f. Deutsches Schriftthum, Berlin 1895
- Der erste Hofnarr. (Schauspiel) Baumert & Ronge, Großenhain und Leipzig 1899
- Das Teutsche Dichterross in allen Gangarten vorgeritten. (Parody) Verl. der Deutsch-Französischen Rundschau, Munich 1901.
- Die Verdammten. (Schauspiel) E. Bloch, Berlin 1901
- (Jodok) Der Veterinärarzt – Mystodrama in einem Aufzug. in "Die elf Scharfrichter". Vo. 1, pp. 79–112. Schuster und Loeffler, Berlin 1901
- (Jodok) Der Nachbar – Monodrama in einem Satz. in "Die elf Scharfrichter". Vol. 1, pp. 113–128. Schuster und Loeffler, Berlin 1901
- (Jodok) Überdramen (Parodies, 3 volumes.) Th. Mayhofer Nachf., Berlin 1902
- Die Einzige. (tragicomedy) Callwey, Munich 1903
- Grundlagen der wissenschaftlichen Philosophie. Callwey, Munich 1903
- König Konrad I. (geschichtliches Schauspiel) Callwey, Munich 1904
- König Heinrich I. (geschichtliches Schauspiel) Callwey, Munich 1904
- Herzog Philipps Brautfahrt. (Opernlustspiel) Callwey, Munich 1904
- Aus meinem lyrischen Tagebuch. Callwey, Munich 1906
- Bellman-Brevier – Aus Fredmans Episteln und Liedern, Deutsch von Hanns von Gumppenberg, Verlag von Albert Langen, Munich 1909
- Beweis des Großen Fermat'schen Satzes für alle ungeraden Exponenten. Callwey, Munich 1913
- Schauen und Sinnen. (poetry) G. Müller, Munich 1913
- Schaurige Schicksale, fälschende Fama und leere Lorbeeren – Dokumentarisches über meine Bühnenwerke. Callwey, Munich 1914
- Der Pinsel Yings. (comedy) Callwey, Munich 1914
- Philosophie und Okkultismus. Rösl, Munich 1921
- Das Teutsche Dichterross in allen Gangarten vorgeritten. (Parodies) 13. u. 14. erw. Aufl. Callwey, München 1929
- Lebenserinnerungen. Aus dem Nachlass. Eigenbrödler Verlag, Berlin 1930
