= Dominique Monet =

Canadian politician

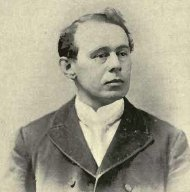

Member of the Canadian Parliament for Napierville
- In office 1891–1896
- Preceded by: François-Xavier Paradis
- Succeeded by: The electoral district was abolished in 1892.

Member of the Canadian Parliament for Laprairie—Napierville
- In office 1896–1904
- Preceded by: The electoral district was created in 1892.
- Succeeded by: Roch Lanctôt

Member of the Legislative Assembly of Quebec for Napierville
- In office 1904–1905
- Preceded by: Cyprien Dorris
- Succeeded by: Cyprien Dorris

Personal details
- Born: 2 January 1865 St-Michel de Napierville, Canada East
- Died: 6 February 1923 (aged 58) Near San Juan, Puerto Rico
- Party: Liberal
- Other political affiliations: Quebec Liberal Party
- Cabinet: Minister Without Portfolio (1905); Minister of Colonization and Public Works (Acting)

Dominique Monet, QC (2 January 1865 – 6 February 1923) was a Canadian lawyer, politician, and judge.

Born in St-Michel de Napierville, Canada East, the son of Dominique Monet, Monet was educated at L'Assomption College and received an LL.D. from Laval University in 1889. He was called to the Quebec Bar in 1889 and was created a Queen's Counsel in 1899. He practiced law in Saint-Rémi, Montreal and Saint-Jean. He was first elected to the House of Commons of Canada for the electoral district of Napierville in the 1891 federal election. A Liberal, he was re-elected in the 1896 and 1900 election for the electoral district of Laprairie—Napierville.

In 1904, he was elected as the Liberal candidate to the Legislative Assembly of Quebec for the electoral district of Napierville. In February 1905, he was made a Minister Without Portfolio in the cabinet of Simon-Napoléon Parent and soon after was appointed Minister of Colonization and Public Works for a brief time. In October 1905, he was appointed Protonotary for the district of Montreal. In 1908, he was made a judge of the Superior Court for the district of d'Iberville.

He died while at sea near San Juan, Puerto Rico on 6 February 1923. He was buried in Saint-Jean.

1891 Canadian federal election: Napierville
Party	Candidate	Votes
Liberal	Dominique Monet	817
Conservative	François-Xavier Paradis	799
