= François-Xavier Paradis =

Canadian politician

MLA for Napierville
- In office 9 December 1890 – 3 February 1891
- Preceded by: Laurent-David Lafontaine
- Succeeded by: Eugène Lafontaine

MP for Napierville
- In office 9 December 1890 – 3 February 1891
- Preceded by: Louis Sainte-Marie
- Succeeded by: Dominique Monet

Personal details
- Born: 9 February 1844 Saint-Rémi, Canada East
- Died: 27 June 1910 (aged 66)
- Party: Conservative
- Occupation: Farmer, merchant

François-Xavier Paradis (9 February 1844 — 27 June 1910) was a Canadian politician.

The son of François Paradis and Marcelline Coupal, Paradis represented the provincial electoral district of Napierville in the Legislative Assembly of Quebec from 1881 to 1886 as a member of the Quebec Conservative Party. He was an unsuccessful candidate for a seat in the provincial assembly in 1878 and again in 1886 and 1890.

In the 1887 federal election, he stood as the Conservative Party candidate in the federal district of Napierville, but was defeated by Louis Sainte-Marie. Following Ste-Marie's resignation in 1890, Paradis was acclaimed to the seat in the resulting by-election, but he was defeated again by Liberal Dominique Monet in the 1891 election.

Paradis was educated at Saint-Michel and Hemmingford. He was mayor of Saint-Michel from 1880 to 1881. Paradis was married twice: to Basilide Robert in 1863 and to Marie Renaud in 1880. After his defeat for a seat in the House of Commons in 1891, he moved to Montreal, where he became involved in real estate. Paradis died there at the age of 66.

== Electoral record ==
1887 Canadian federal election: Napierville
Party	Candidate	Votes
Liberal	Louis Sainte-Marie	908
Conservative	François-Xavier Paradis	687

By-election on 9 December 1890
Party	Candidate	Votes
Conservative	François-Xavier Paradis	acclaimed
