= Witness (mathematics) =

Input value for which an existential statement of a function is true

In mathematical logic, a witness is a specific value t to be substituted for variable x of an existential statement of the form ∃x φ(x) such that φ(t) is true.

== Examples ==
For example, a theory T of arithmetic is said to be inconsistent if there exists a proof in T of the formula "0 = 1". The formula I(T), which says that T is inconsistent, is thus an existential formula. A witness for the inconsistency of T is a particular proof of "0 = 1" in T.

Boolos, Burgess, and Jeffrey (2002:81) define the notion of a witness with the example, in which S is an n-place relation on natural numbers, R is an (n+1)-place recursive relation, and ↔ indicates logical equivalence (if and only if):

S(x_{1}, ..., x_{n}) ↔ ∃y R(x_{1}, . . ., x_{n}, y)

"A y such that R holds of the x_{i} may be called a 'witness' to the relation S holding of the x_{i} (provided we understand that when the witness is a number rather than a person, a witness only testifies to what is true)."

In this particular example, the authors defined s to be (positively) recursively semidecidable, or simply semirecursive.

== Henkin witnesses ==
In predicate calculus, a Henkin witness for a sentence $\exists x\, \varphi(x)$ in a theory T is a term c such that T proves φ(c) (Hinman 2005:196). The use of such witnesses is a key technique in the proof of Gödel's completeness theorem presented by Leon Henkin in 1949.

== Relation to game semantics ==
The notion of witness leads to the more general idea of game semantics. In the case of sentence $\exists x\, \varphi(x)$ the winning strategy for the verifier is to pick a witness for $\varphi$. For more complex formulas involving universal quantifiers, the existence of a winning strategy for the verifier depends on the existence of appropriate Skolem functions. For example, if S denotes $\forall x \, \exists y\, \varphi(x,y)$ then an equisatisfiable statement for S is $\exists f \,\forall x \, \varphi(x,f(x))$. The Skolem function f (if it exists) actually codifies a winning strategy for the verifier of S by returning a witness for the existential sub-formula for every choice of x the falsifier might make.

== See also ==
- Certificate (complexity), an analogous concept in computational complexity theory
- Witness set
