= Louis-Joseph Moll =

Canadian politician

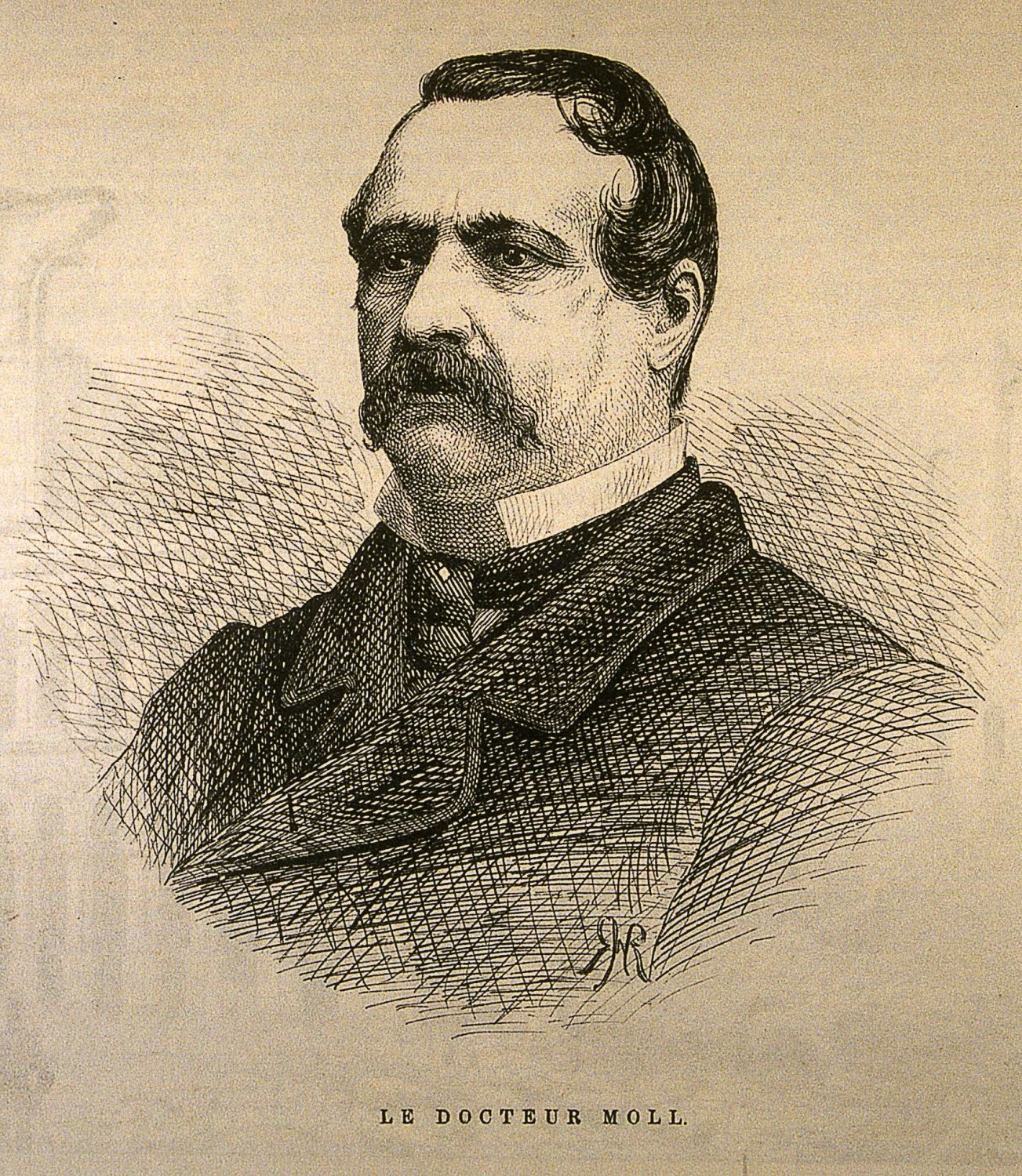

Member of the Legislative Assembly of Quebec for Berthier
- In office 1867–1871
- Succeeded by: Louis Sylvestre

Personal details
- Born: August 24, 1816 Notre-Dame de Montréal, Lower Canada
- Died: August 5, 1872 (aged 55) Berthier, Quebec
- Party: Conservative
- Relations: Joseph Bondy, dit Douaire, father-in-law Eugène Lafontaine, son-in-law
- Education: Collège de Montréal; University of Pennsylvania

Louis-Joseph Moll (August 24, 1816 – August 5, 1872) was a physician and political figure in Quebec. He represented Berthier in the Legislative Assembly of Quebec from 1867 to 1871 as a Conservative.

He was born in Notre-Dame de Montréal, Lower Canada, the son of Jean-Marie Moll and Catherine-Louise Finchley, and was educated at the Collège de Montréal and the University of Pennsylvania.

In 1841, he married Marie-Joséphine-Valérie, the daughter of Joseph Bondy, dit Douaire. He returned to Quebec in 1845 and entered the practice of medicine at Berthier. Moll was a Justice of the peace and a commissioner for the trial of small causes. He was defeated when he ran for reelection in 1871. Moll died in Berthier at the age of 55.

His daughter Elmire married Eugène Lafontaine.
