= U. S. R. Murty =

Indian mathematician

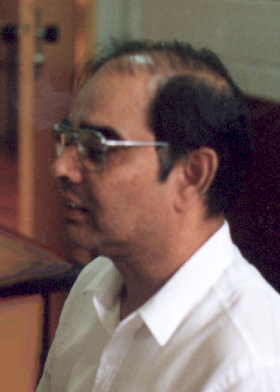
- U.S.R. Murty in 1996
- Born: Uppaluri Siva Ramachandra Murty; 23 December 1940
- Died: 13 May 2025 (aged 84); Toronto, Ontario
- Education: Indian Statistical Institute
- Scientific career
- Fields: Mathematics
- Workplaces: University of Waterloo
- Thesis: Extremal Graph Theoretic Problems with Applications to Communication Networks (1967)
- Doctoral advisor: C. R. Rao
- Doctoral students: William J. Cook
- Website: uwaterloo.ca/combinatorics-and-optimization/contacts/uppaluri-s-r-murty

Uppaluri Siva Ramachandra Murty, (23 December 1940 – 13 May 2025) was a professor of the Department of Combinatorics and Optimization at the University of Waterloo in Ontario, Canada.

U. S. R. Murty received his Ph.D. in 1967 from the Indian Statistical Institute, Calcutta, with a thesis on extremal graph theory; his advisor was C. R. Rao. Murty is well known for his work in matroid theory and graph theory, and mainly for being a co-author with J. A. Bondy of a textbook on graph theory. Murty has served as a managing editor and co-editor-in-chief of the Journal of Combinatorial Theory, Series B. He died in Toronto, Ontario on 13 May 2025.

== Selected publications ==
- John Adrian Bondy and U. S. R. Murty (1976), Graph Theory with Applications. North-Holland. Book's page at the University of Paris VI.
- John Adrian Bondy and U. S. R. Murty (1979), "Graph Theory and Related Topics." Academic Press Inc. ISBN 978-0121143503.
- U. S. R. Murty (1971) How Many Magic Configurations are There? The American Mathematical Monthly.
- U. S. R. Murty (1971) Equicardinal matroids. Journal of Combinatorial Theory, Series B
- U. S. R. Murty (1970) Matroids with Sylvester property. Aequationes Mathematicae.
- Murty, U. S. R. (1968), "On some extremal graphs", Acta Mathematica Academiae Scientiarum Hungaricae, 19 (1–2): 69–74, doi:10.1007/BF01894681, MR 0224509, S2CID 116198339
- de Carvalho, Marcelo H.; Lucchesi, Cláudio L.; Murty, U. S. R. (2002), "On a conjecture of Lovász concerning bricks. II. Bricks of finite characteristic", Journal of Combinatorial Theory, Series B, 85 (1): 137–180, doi:10.1006/jctb.2001.2092, MR 1900684.
