= Pierre Benoit (MLA) =

Canadian politician

Member of the Legislative Assembly of Quebec for Napierville
- In office 1867–1870
- Succeeded by: Laurent-David Lafontaine

Personal details
- Born: 30 April 1824 Longueuil, Lower Canada
- Died: 26 August 1870 (aged 46) Napierville, Quebec
- Party: Liberal

Pierre Benoit (French pronunciation: [pjɛʁ bənwa]; 30 April 1824 – 26 August 1870) was a member of the Legislative Assembly of Quebec.

He practised his profession as a notary in Saint-Rémi, Quebec from 1846 to 1861. He was elected to the Legislative Assembly of the Province of Canada for Napierville in a by-election in 1862, representing the Parti rouge; he was defeated in 1863.

He was elected to the first Legislative Assembly of Quebec in the 1867 general election for the Quebec Liberal Party in Napierville. He died in office.
