= Antoine-Aimé Dorion =

Canadian politician (1818–1891)

The Honourable Sir Antoine-Aimé Dorion PC
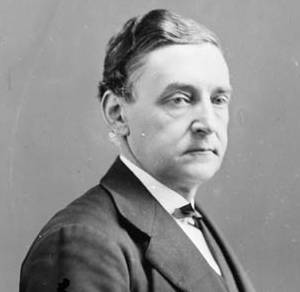
- Dorion in 1873
- Born: January 17, 1818; Sainte-Anne-de-la-Pérade, Lower Canada
- Died: May 31, 1891 (aged 73); Montreal, Canada
- Resting place: Notre Dame des Neiges Cemetery
- Occupations: Politician, lawyer, and judge
- Relatives: Pierre-Antoine Dorion (father); Jean-Baptiste-Éric Dorion (brother)

Signature
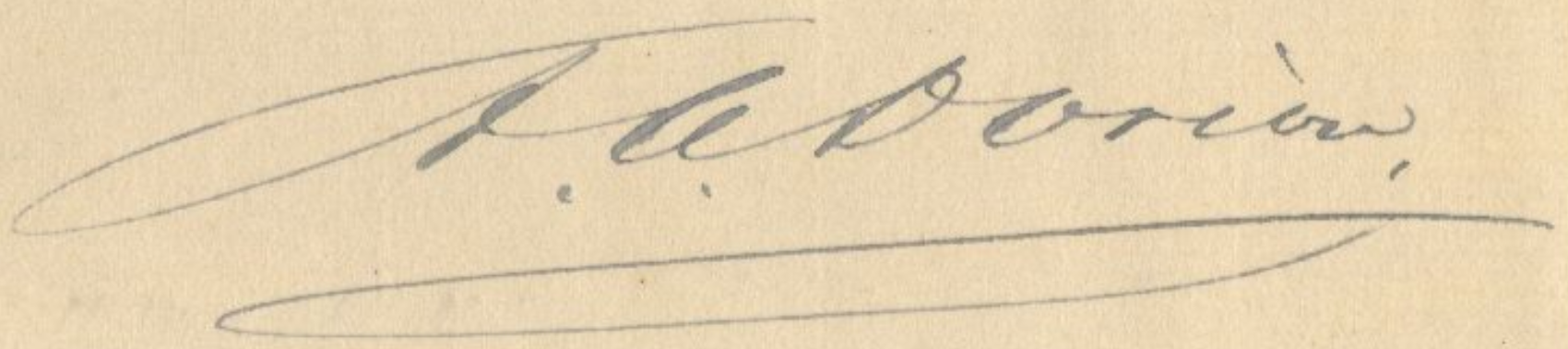

Sir Antoine-Aimé Dorion PC (January 17, 1818 – May 31, 1891) was a French Canadian politician, lawyer, and judge.

== Early years ==
Dorion was born on January 17, 1818, in Sainte-Anne-de-la-Pérade, to a family with liberal values that were sympathetic to the Patriote movement in 1837–1838. His father, merchant Pierre-Antoine Dorion, was a representative of the Patriote party in the Legislative Assembly of Lower Canada from 1830 to 1838.

After studies at the Nicolet seminary from 1830 to 1837, in his twenty-second year went to Montreal to read law with Côme-Séraphin Cherrier, an eminent lawyer with whom he retained a lasting friendship. On 6 January 1842, he was admitted to the bar of the province, became the partner of M. Cherrier, and in the course of a few years attained the highest rank in his profession.

== Political rise ==
Dorion descended from a Liberal family which from early days had supported the Reform party in Canada. In addition to his father, his maternal grandfather represented the county of Saint Maurice in the Legislative Assembly from 1819 to 1830. At the time Dorion commenced the study of law, Canada was entering a struggle between Lower Canada and Upper Canada for a balance of representation.

Although a decisive political victory had been gained, and a responsible government formed, by Louis-Hippolyte Lafontaine and Robert Baldwin in 1848, they did not press for an immediate overthrow of existing institutions, and in 1851, the administration was handed over to Francis Hincks and Augustin-Norbert Morin.

The elections of 1854 had brought new reformist blood into the ranks of the Liberal party. Dorion was elected as member of the assembly for the province of Canada for the city of Montreal, and was chosen as leader. It seemed that the coalition government under Allan MacNab had clarified the situation, but by 1856 Upper Canada had increased, and it contributed a larger share to the revenue, and demanded proportionate representation. Dorion understood the true principle of federation as applicable to Canada, but he did not pursue this idea, and in fact his following was never sufficiently strong to enable him to give effect to the sound measures he was so capable of formulating.

== Government ==
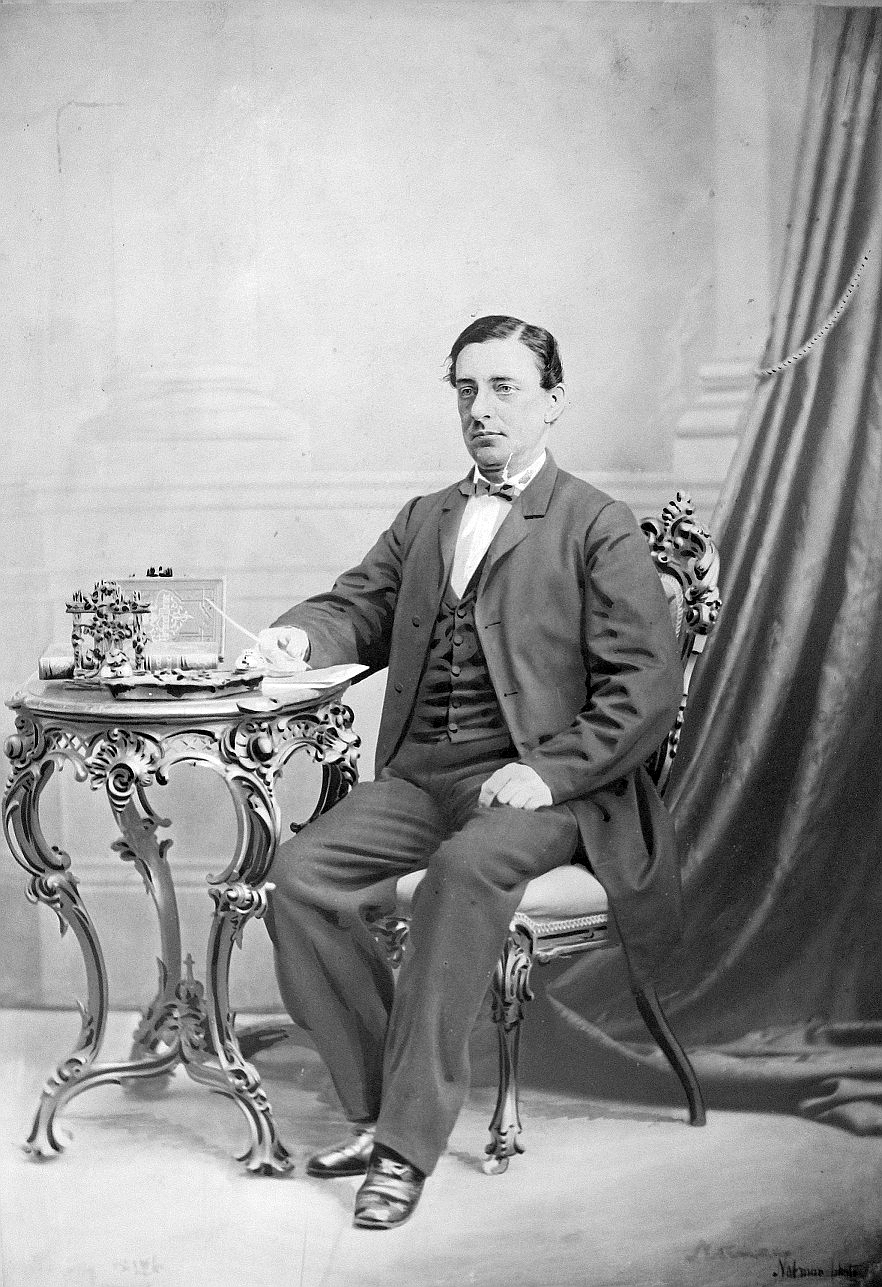
Dorion in 1865, collection of the Law Society of Upper Canada

In 1858, Dorion served as Co-Premier of the Province of Canada with Clear Grit leader George Brown (Canadian politician) but the government fell within three days. From 1863 to 1864 Dorion again served as Co-Premier, this time with John Sandfield Macdonald as well as taking the position of Attorney-General, but refused to participate in the Great Coalition government formed in 1864 by Brown, John A. Macdonald and George-Étienne Cartier.

Following the Quebec Conference of 1864 he denounced the proposed Canadian Confederation and led the opposition in Lower Canada to the project. He was also the leader of the Parti Rouge and thought the provinces would lose their power if Confederation was put into action. He disapproved that the colonies of New Brunswick, Nova Scotia, and Prince Edward Island were uniting under a central government. Dorion expressed his rejection of confederation through a manifesto in 1864, multiple articles from 1865 to 1867, and his attendance at opposition meetings in Lower Canada.

== House of Commons ==
Nevertheless, when Confederation became a reality, Dorion won a seat in the new House of Commons of Canada as a Liberal Member of Parliament for Hochelaga. He was re-elected three times in succession for Napierville and served as Minister of Justice in the Liberal government of Alexander Mackenzie from 7 November 1873 and during the six months that he was in office passed the Electoral Law of 1874 and the Controverted Elections Act.

Dorion was appointed by John A. Macdonald to the parliamentary committee to investigate allegations related to the Pacific Scandal in 1873. On 1 June 1874 he was named chief justice of the Court of Queen's Bench of Quebec. In 1875, he was offered a position as a puisne justice on the newly created Supreme Court of Canada, however Dorion rejected the position believing the position would be a decline in his legal status.

Dorion died on May 31, 1891, aged 73, in Montreal, and was entombed at the Notre Dame des Neiges Cemetery in Montreal.

1867 Canadian federal election: Hochelaga
Party	Candidate	Votes	%
Liberal	Antoine-Aimé Dorion	1,312	50.44
Unknown	J. Lanouette	1,289	49.56
Total valid votes		2,601	100.00
Eligible voters		3,448	
Source: Canadian Parliamentary Guide, 1871

== Honours ==
In 1878, Dorion was created a Knight Bachelor.

The Township Municipality of Dorion in the Outaouais region of Quebec, Canada, was named in his honour (but renamed to Cayamant).

== Family ==
In 1848 Dorion married Iphigénie, the daughter of Dr. Jean Baptiste Trestler and Eulalie Delisle of Montreal.

== See also ==
- List of presidents of the Saint-Jean-Baptiste Society of Montreal

== Sources ==
- "Biography". Dictionnaire des parlementaires du Québec de 1792 à nos jours (in French). National Assembly of Quebec.
- "Antoine-Aimé Dorion". Dictionary of Canadian Biography (online ed.). University of Toronto Press. 1979–2016.
- Antoine-Aimé Dorion – Parliament of Canada biography

Political offices
Preceded by Sir Antoine-Aimé Dorion	Joint Premiers of the Province of Canada - Canada East; 1858	Succeeded by with Sir George-Étienne Cartier
Preceded by Sir Louis-Victor Sicotte	Joint Premiers of the Province of Canada - Canada East; 1863–1864	Succeeded by with Sir Étienne-Paschal Taché
Preceded by riding created	Member of Parliament - Hochelaga; 1867–1872	Succeeded by Louis Beaubien
Preceded by Sixte Coupal dit la Reine	Member of Parliament - Napierville; 1872–1874	Succeeded by Sixte Coupal dit la Reine
Preceded by John A. Macdonald	Minister of Justice; 1873–1874	Succeeded by Albert James Smith

Preceded by Louis Victor Sicotte	Speaker of the Legislative Assembly of the United Provinces of Canada; 1858–1861	Succeeded by Joseph-Édouard Turcotte
