= Bondi =

Bondi may refer to:

== Sydney, Australia ==
- Bondi, New South Wales, a suburb
  - Bondi Beach, a beach and suburb
  - Bondi Road, a major road
  - Bondi Junction, a suburb and commercial centre
  - Bondi Junction railway station
- North Bondi, a suburb

== Elsewhere ==
- Little Bondi, Northern Territory, Australia, a suburb in the Gove Peninsula

== Other uses ==
- Bondi (name), surname
- BONDI (OMTP), API framework for mobile devices
- Bóndi, Norse middle class

== See also ==
- Bondi Beach (disambiguation)
- Bondi Ink Tattoo, Australian television series
- 2024 Bondi Junction stabbings, a mass stabbing that took place at Bondi Junction
- 2025 Bondi Beach shooting, a mass shooting that took place at Bondi Beach.
- Bondi Sands, Australian self-tanning brand
- Bondi Vet, Australian factual TV series
- The Von Bondies, U.S. rock band
- Bondita Acharya
- Bondie (disambiguation)
- Bondy (disambiguation)
- Bond (disambiguation)
