= Vincent Dupuis =

Canadian politician

Member of the Canadian Parliament for Laprairie—Napierville
- In office July 1929 – October 1935
- Preceded by: Roch Lanctôt
- Succeeded by: riding dissolved

Member of the Canadian Parliament for Chambly—Rouville
- In office October 1935 – April 1945
- Preceded by: riding created
- Succeeded by: Roch Pinard

Senator for Rigaud, Quebec
- In office 18 April 1945 – 11 May 1967
- Appointed by: William Lyon Mackenzie King
- Preceded by: Arthur Sauvé
- Succeeded by: Lazarus Phillips

Personal details
- Born: 22 January 1889 Saint-Philippe-de-Laprairie, Quebec, Canada
- Died: 11 May 1967 (aged 78)
- Party: Liberal
- Spouse(s): Yvonne Larose m. 11 February 1918
- Profession: lawyer

Vincent Dupuis (22 January 1889 – 11 May 1967) was a Liberal party member of the House of Commons of Canada and a Senator. He was born in Saint-Philippe-de-Laprairie, Quebec and became a lawyer by career.

Dupuis attended normal school, then junior college at Montreal, then McGill University. He became registrar of Laprairie County, and was appointed King's Counsel.

He was first elected to Parliament at the Laprairie—Napierville riding in a by-election on 22 July 1929 then re-elected there for a full term in the 1930 election. When his riding was disbanded in 1933, Dupuis sought re-election at Chambly—Rouville in the 1935 election and won. He was re-elected for one final House of Commons term in 1940. In 1945, Dupuis was appointed to the Senate and held that post until his death on 11 May 1967.

From 1928 to 1930, Dupuis had also served as a municipal councillor of Laprairie, Quebec.
