= Sixte Coupal dit la Reine =

Canadian politician

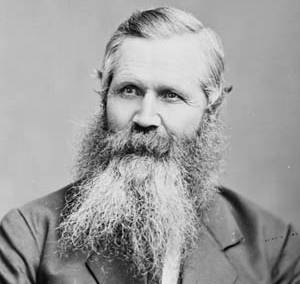

MP for Napierville Parliament of the Province of Canada 1863-1867
- In office 1863 – July 8, 1872
- Preceded by: Jacques-Olivier Bureau
- Succeeded by: Antoine-Aimé Dorion

MP for Napierville
- In office August 4, 1874 – May 18, 1882
- Preceded by: Antoine-Aimé Dorion
- Succeeded by: Médéric Catudal

Personal details
- Born: May 1, 1825 Napierville, Quebec
- Died: June 22, 1891 (aged 66)
- Party: Liberal
- Occupation: Farmer

Sixte Coupal dit la Reine (May 1, 1825 – June 22, 1891) was a farmer and political figure in Lower Canada and Quebec, Canada. He represented Napierville in the House of Commons of Canada from 1867 to 1872 and from 1874 to 1882 as a Liberal member.

He was born Sixte Coupal in Saint-Cyprien-de-Léry, Lower Canada in 1825. He served as justice of the peace and also as mayor of Napierville. In 1863, he was elected to the Legislative Assembly of the Province of Canada for Napierville as a member of the parti rouge. He was elected again after Confederation but defeated in 1872 and 1874. He was elected in an 1874 by-election but the result was ruled invalid; he was reelected in the by-election that followed.

He died at Saint-Jovite in 1891.

1867 Canadian federal election: Napierville
Party	Candidate	Votes
Liberal	Sixte Coupal dit la Reine	878
Unknown	M. Laviolette	344
Eligible voters		2,018
Source: Canadian Parliamentary Guide, 1871

1874 Canadian federal election: Napierville
Party	Candidate	Votes
Liberal	Antoine-Aimé Dorion	731
Liberal	Sixte Coupal dit la Reine	542
Source: lop.parl.ca

By-election on 4 August 1874; On Dorion's elevation to the Chief Justiceship of Quebec
Party	Candidate	Votes
Liberal	Sixte Coupal dit la Reine	618
Unknown	Antoine Goyer	609

By-election on 19 June 1875; On Coupal being unseated on petition
Party	Candidate	Votes
Liberal	Sixte Coupal dit la Reine	721
Unknown	Louis Bédard	637

1878 Canadian federal election: Napierville
Party	Candidate	Votes
Liberal	Sixte Coupal dit la Reine	749
Unknown	J.E. Bureau	617

1882 Canadian federal election: Napierville
Party	Candidate	Votes
Liberal	Médéric Catudal	765
Liberal	Sixte Coupal dit la Reine	618
