= Saint-Mathieu, Quebec =

Saint-Mathieu
- Municipality
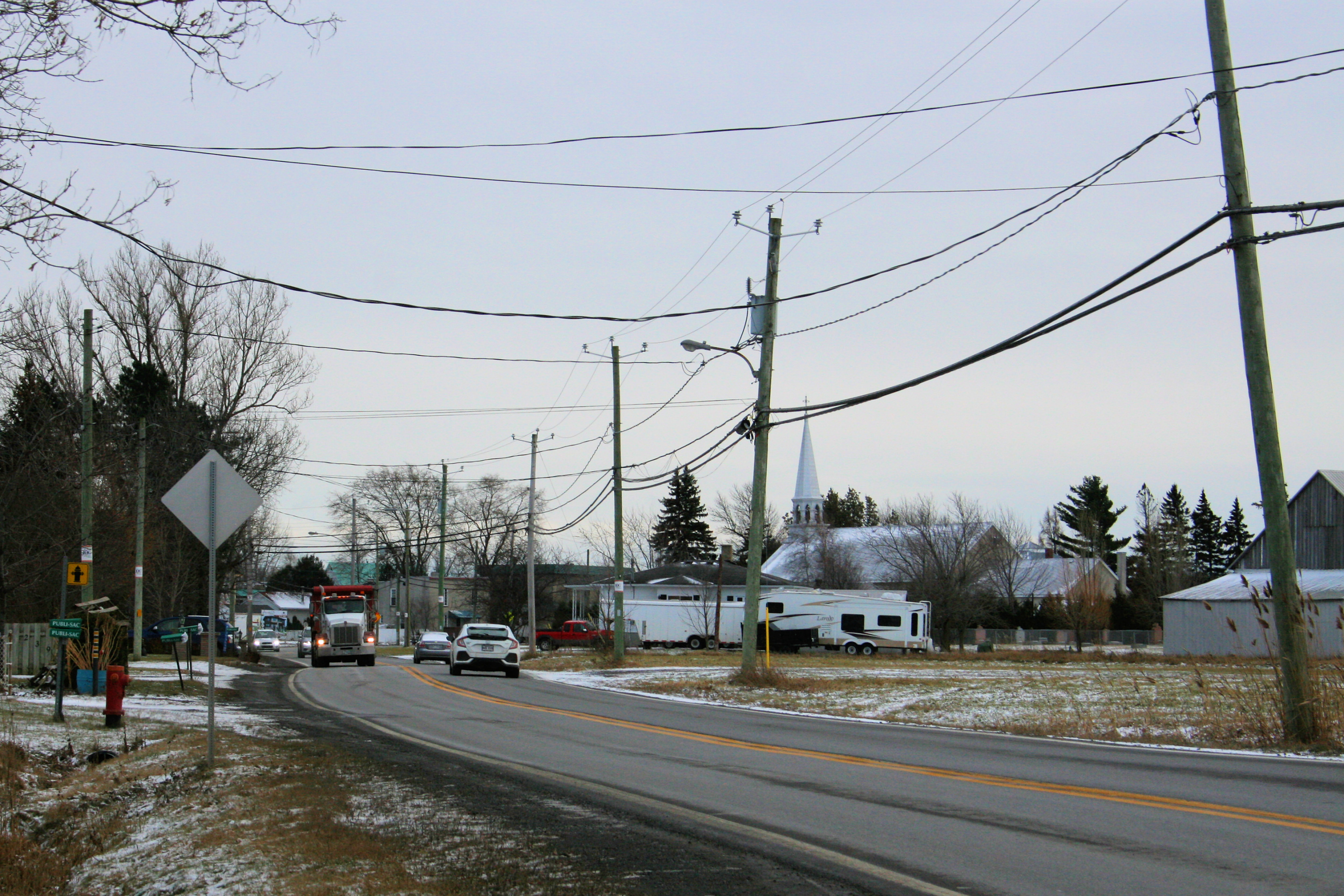
- Rue Principale in Saint-Mathieu

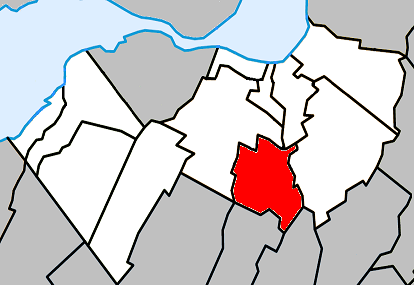
- Location within Roussillon RCM

- Location in southern Quebec
- Coordinates: 45°19′00″N 073°30′59″W
- Country: Canada
- Province: Quebec
- Region: Montérégie
- RCM: Roussillon
- Constituted: August 1, 1917

Government
  - Mayor: Lise Poissant
  - Federal riding: La Prairie
  - Prov. riding: Sanguinet

Area
  - Total: 31.50 km^{2} (12.16 sq mi)
  - Land: 31.41 km^{2} (12.13 sq mi)

Population (2021)
  - Total: 2,339
  - Density: 74.5/km^{2} (193/sq mi)
  - Pop 2016-2021: ▲8.5%
  - Dwellings: 951
- Time zone: UTC−5 (EST)
  - Summer (DST): UTC−4 (EDT)
- Postal code(s): J0L 2H0
- Area codes: 450 and 579
- Highways: A-15
- Website: saint-mathieu.com

Saint-Mathieu (French pronunciation: [sɛ̃ matjø]) is a municipality situated in the Montérégie administrative region in Quebec, Canada. The population as of the Canada 2021 Census was 2,339. It is part of the Roussillon Regional County Municipality.

== Demographics ==
=== Population ===
Canada census – Saint-Mathieu community profile

	2021	2016	2011
Population	2,339 (+8.5% from 2016)	2,156 (14.7% from 2011)	1,879 (-0.8% from 2006)
Land area	31.41 km^{2} (12.13 sq mi)	31.43 km^{2} (12.14 sq mi)	31.59 km^{2} (12.20 sq mi)
Population density	74.5/km^{2} (193/sq mi)	68.6/km^{2} (178/sq mi)	59.5/km^{2} (154/sq mi)
Median age	41.2 (M: 41.2, F: 41.2)	41.5 (M: 41.2, F: 41.8)	42.2 (M: 41.7, F: 42.8)
Private dwellings	935 (total)	895 (total)	783 (total)
Median household income	$86,000	$70,144	$61,664

References: 2021 2016 2011

Historical Census Data - Saint-Mathieu, Quebec
Year	Pop.	±%
1921	569	—
1931	463	−18.6%
1941	428	−7.6%
1951	447	+4.4%
1956	486	+8.7%
1961	611	+25.7%
1966	667	+9.2%
1971	734	+10.0%
1976	1,227	+67.2%
1981	1,532	+24.9%
1986	1,646	+7.4%
1991	1,753	+6.5%
1996	1,925	+9.8%
2001	1,961	+1.9%
2006	1,894	−3.4%
2011	1,879	−0.8%
2016	2,156	+14.7%
2021	2,339	+8.5%

=== Language ===
Canada Census Mother Tongue - Saint-Mathieu, Quebec
Census	Total	French			English			French & English			Other		
Year	Responses	Count	Trend	Pop %	Count	Trend	Pop %	Count	Trend	Pop %	Count	Trend	Pop %
2021	2,325	2,130	▲6.5%	91.6%	75	0.0%	3.2%	50	▲150.0%	2.2%	60	0.0%	2.6%
2016	2,130	2,000	▲16.3%	92.8%	75	▼11.8%	3.5%	20	0.0%	0.9%	60	▲20.0%	2.8%
2011	1,875	1,720	▲0.3%	91.73%	85	▼15.0%	4.53%	20	▼20.0%	1.07%	50	0.0%	2.67%
2006	1,890	1,715	▼5.0%	90.74%	100	▼20.0%	5.29%	25	▲150.0%	1.32%	50	▲100.0%	2.65%
2001	1,965	1,805	▲0.8%	91.86%	125	▲4.2%	6.36%	10	▼33.3%	0.51%	25	▲66.7%	1.27%
1996	1,940	1,790	n/a	92.27%	120	n/a	6.19%	15	n/a	0.77%	15	n/a	0.77%

== See also ==
- Les Jardins-de-Napierville Regional County Municipality
- Rivière de la Tortue (Delson)
- List of municipalities in Quebec
