= Laprairie—Napierville =

Former federal electoral district in Quebec, Canada

Quebec electoral district

Defunct federal electoral district
- Legislature: House of Commons
- District created: 1892
- District abolished: 1933
- First contested: 1896
- Last contested: 1930

Laprairie—Napierville (French pronunciation: [lapʁɛʁi napjɛʁvil]) was a federal electoral district in Quebec, Canada, that was represented in the House of Commons of Canada from 1896 to 1935.

This riding was created in 1892 from Laprairie and Napierville ridings. It consisted initially of:

- the villages of Laprairie, St. Rémi and Napierville, and
- the parishes de Laprairie, St. Constant, St. Isidore, St. Jacques le Mineur, St. Philippe, St. Michel Archange, St. Patrice de Sherrington, St. Édouard, St. Cyprien and St. Rémi.

In 1903, the Indian village and reserve of Caughnawaga were transferred from Châteauguay riding into Laprairie—Napierville.

In 1924, it was defined to consist of the Counties of Laprairie and Napierville.

It was abolished in 1933 when it was redistributed into Beauharnois—Laprairie and St. Johns—Iberville—Napierville ridings.

== Members of Parliament ==
This riding elected the following members of Parliament:

Parliament	Years	Member	Party
Laprairie—Napierville; Riding created from Laprairie and Napierville
8th	1896–1900	Dominique Monet	Liberal
9th	1900–1904	Dominique Monet	Liberal
10th	1904–1908	Roch Lanctôt	Liberal
11th	1908–1911	Roch Lanctôt	Liberal
12th	1911–1917	Roch Lanctôt	Liberal
13th	1917–1921	Roch Lanctôt	Opposition (Laurier Liberals)
14th	1921–1925	Roch Lanctôt	Liberal
15th	1925–1926	Roch Lanctôt	Liberal
16th	1926–1929	Roch Lanctôt	Liberal
16th	1929–1930	Vincent Dupuis	Liberal
17th	1930–1935	Vincent Dupuis	Liberal
Riding dissolved into Beauharnois—Laprairie and St. Johns—Iberville—Napierville

== Election results ==
1896 Canadian federal election
Party	Candidate	Votes
Liberal	Dominique Monet	1,734
Conservative	L. C. Pelletier	1,458

1900 Canadian federal election
Party	Candidate	Votes
Liberal	Dominique Monet	1,653
Conservative	Maximilien Coupal	1,557

1904 Canadian federal election
Party	Candidate	Votes
Liberal	Roch Lanctôt	1,797
Conservative	Maximilien Coupal	1,561

1908 Canadian federal election
Party	Candidate	Votes
Liberal	Roch Lanctôt	1,923
Conservative	Siméon Beaudin	1,539

1911 Canadian federal election
Party	Candidate	Votes
Liberal	Roch Lanctôt	1,795
Conservative	Gustave Monette	1,626

1917 Canadian federal election
Party	Candidate	Votes
Opposition (Laurier Liberals)	Roch Lanctôt	3,395
Government (Unionist)	Mastaï Pagnuelo	143

1921 Canadian federal election
Party	Candidate	Votes
Liberal	Roch Lanctôt	4,458
Conservative	Louis Moïse Cornellier	1,213

1925 Canadian federal election
Party	Candidate	Votes
Liberal	Roch Lanctôt	3,956
Conservative	Arthur Brossard	2,635
Independent	Joseph Hildège Lamarre	356

1926 Canadian federal election
Party	Candidate	Votes
Liberal	Roch Lanctôt	4,201
Conservative	Léopold Doyon	2,844

By-election: On Mr. Lanctôt's death, 30 May 1929

By-election on 22 July 1929
Party	Candidate	Votes
Liberal	Vincent Dupuis	acclaimed

1930 Canadian federal election
Party	Candidate	Votes
Liberal	Vincent Dupuis	4,321
Conservative	Gustave Monette	3,968

== See also ==
- List of Canadian electoral districts
- Historical federal electoral districts of Canada
