= Even circuit theorem =

The highest amount of edges for 7 vertices banning 4 and 6 cycles respectively

In extremal graph theory, the even circuit theorem is a result of Paul Erdős according to which an n-vertex graph that does not have a simple cycle of length 2k can only have O(n^{1 + 1/k}) edges. For instance, 4-cycle-free graphs have O(n^{3/2}) edges, 6-cycle-free graphs have O(n^{4/3}) edges, etc.

== History ==
The result was stated without proof by Erdős in 1964. Bondy & Simonovits (1974) published the first proof, and strengthened the theorem to show that, for n-vertex graphs with Ω(n^{1 + 1/k}) edges, all even cycle lengths between 2k and 2kn^{1/k} occur.

== Lower bounds ==
Unsolved problem in mathematics
Do there exist $2k$-cycle-free graphs (for $k$ other than $2$, $3$, or $5$) that have $\Omega(n^{1+1/k})$ edges?
More unsolved problems in mathematics

The bound of Erdős's theorem is tight up to constant factors for some small values of k: for k = 2, 3, or 5, there exist graphs with Ω(n^{1 + 1/k}) edges that have no 2k-cycle.

It is unknown for k other than 2, 3, or 5 whether there exist graphs that have no 2k-cycle but have Ω(n^{1 + 1/k}) edges, matching Erdős's upper bound. Only a weaker bound is known, according to which the number of edges can be Ω(n^{1 + 2/(3k − 3)}) for odd values of k, or Ω(n^{1 + 2/(3k − 4)}) for even values of k.

== Constant factors ==
Because a 4-cycle is a complete bipartite graph, the maximum number of edges in a 4-cycle-free graph can be seen as a special case of the Zarankiewicz problem on forbidden complete bipartite graphs, and the even circuit theorem for this case can be seen as a special case of the Kővári–Sós–Turán theorem. More precisely, in this case it is known that the maximum number of edges in a 4-cycle-free graph is

$$n^{3/2}\left(\frac{1}{2}+o(1)\right).$$

Erdős & Simonovits (1982) conjectured that, more generally, the maximum number of edges in a 2k-cycle-free graph is

$n^{1+1/k}\left(\frac{1}{2}+o(1)\right).$

However, later researchers found that there exist 6-cycle-free graphs and 10-cycle-free graphs with a number of edges that is larger by a constant factor than this conjectured bound, disproving the conjecture. More precisely, the maximum number of edges in a 6-cycle-free graph lies between the bounds

$$0.5338n^{4/3} \le \operatorname{ex}(n,C_6) \le 0.6272n^{4/3},$$

where ex(n,G) denotes the maximum number of edges in an n-vertex graph that has no subgraph isomorphic to G. The maximum number of edges in a 10-cycle-free graph can be at least

$$4\left(\frac{n}{5}\right)^{6/5} \approx 0.5798 n^{6/5}.$$

For general values of k, Pikhurko proved the following upper bound

$\operatorname{ex}(n,C_{2k}) \leq (k-1+o(1))n^{1+1/k}.$

Bukh and Jiang later improved the dependence on k to

$\operatorname{ex}(n,C_{2k}) \leq \left(80\sqrt{k}\log k+o(1)\right)n^{1+1/k}.$

This bound was further improved by He to

$\operatorname{ex}(n,C_{2k}) \leq \left(16\sqrt{5}\sqrt{k\log k}+o(1)\right)n^{1+1/k}.$
