= Emma Ritter-Bondy =

Scottish classical pianist and professor (1838–1894)

- Born: Emma Maria Bondy; January 9, 1838; Graz, Austria
- Died: June 23, 1894 (aged 56); Glasgow, Scotland
- Education: Vienna Conservatory
- Occupations: Pianist and music professor
- Known for: Being the first female professor at a British university.
- Spouse: Franz Ritter (m. 1862)

Emma Ritter-Bondy, also known as Emma Ritter (9 January 1838 in Graz – 23 June 1894 in Glasgow) was a Scottish pianist and music professor of Austrian origin. In 1892 she was appointed the first professor of piano at the Glasgow Athenaeum School of Music, now the Royal Conservatoire of Scotland. She was the first female professor at a British university, almost 16 years before Edith Morley was appointed professor of English literature at the University of Reading in 1908.

== Life and work ==
Ritter-Bondy was born in Graz in 1838 as Emma Maria Bondy. In the mid-1850s she studied piano in the class of Josef Fischhof at the Vienna Conservatory. In 1862 she married artist Franz Ritter. She gave public concerts during her time in Graz and Vienna, for example on 27 February 1867 in Rothenburg ob der Tauber.

Around 1868, the couple moved to Koblenz after getting to know the city on a concert tour. She taught music at Königlichen Gymnasium zu Coblenz, today's Görres-Gymnasium. The couple had two children, daughter Ida (born 14 March 1874) and son Camillo (born 3 December 1875). Her husband died in January 1879.

Ritter-Bondy decided to leave Koblenz with her children in 1881 and to build a new home in Glasgow. She probably chose this city because she was actively involved in the Glasgow Athenaeum School of Music, who at the time was looking for talented musicians all over Europe. In 1892 she was appointed professor of piano at this conservatory. In the same year she and her two children became British citizens. The following year, the three of them performed togetherat the Athenaeum Hall.

Little is known about Ritter-Bondy due to the limited number of files at the Royal Conservatoire of Scotland. The first scholarly work on her is by Irina Vaterl of the Hochschule für Musik und Theater Hamburg, listed below, which draws on additional primary sources. Scotland did not appoint another woman as professor for almost half a century, when Margaret Fairlie was made chair of gynecology at University College, Dundee (later Queen's College, Dundee), according to the 2017 BBC News story about Ritter-Bondy.

Ritter-Bondy died in Glasgow on 23 June 1894. In her will, she decreed that her two children should receive the best possible musical education, preferably in Berlin or London. Camillo completed his education in Berlin and Ida finished hers in London. "While daughter Ida made a name for herself as a piano accompanist, son Camillo became known as a violin virtuoso and teacher."

== Literature ==
- Irina Vaterl (2017), Von Graz nach Glasgow. Die Pianistin Emma Ritter-Bondy (1838–1894) (in German), Graz
