= Saint-Patrice-de-Sherrington =

- Municipality
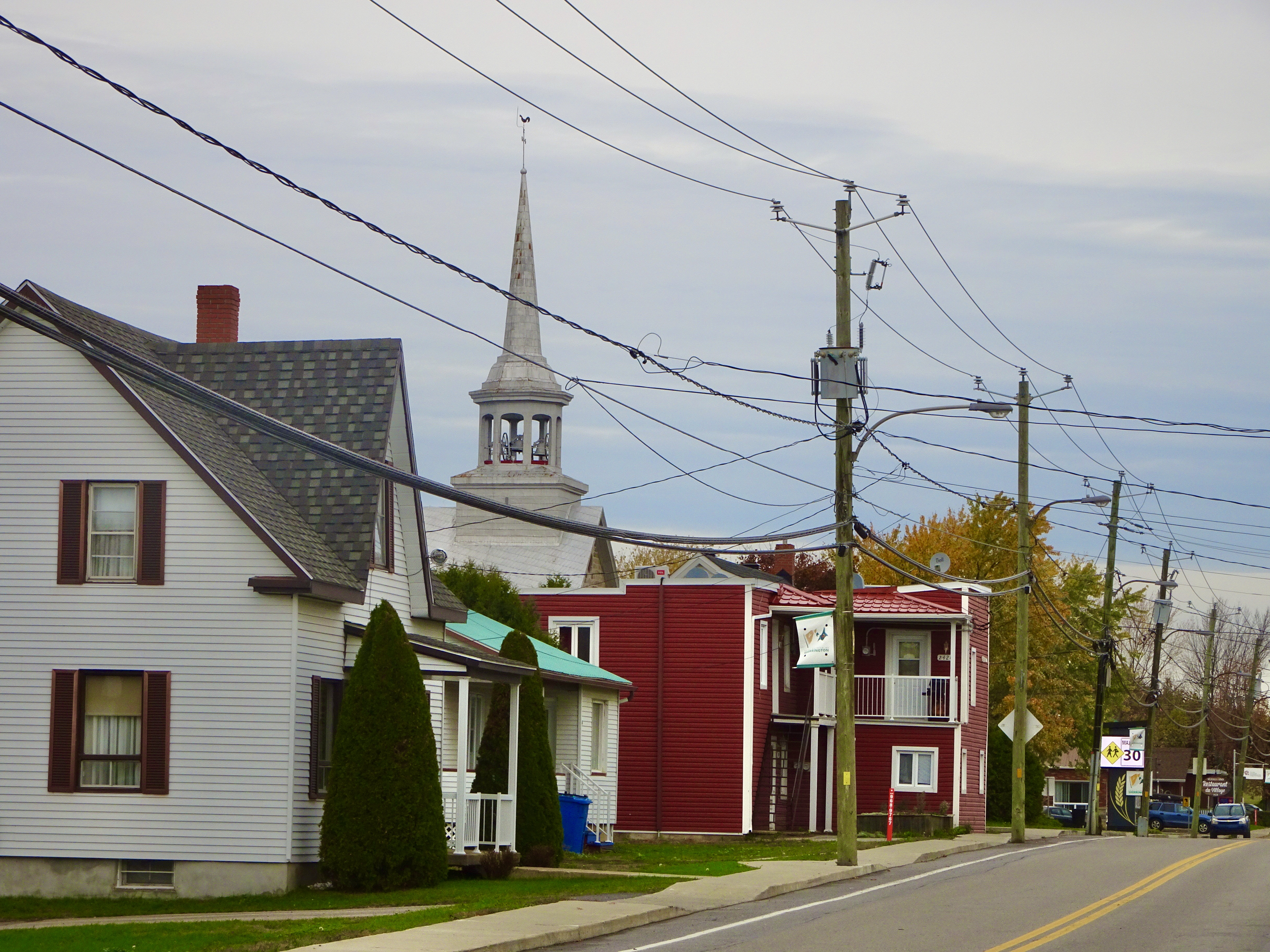

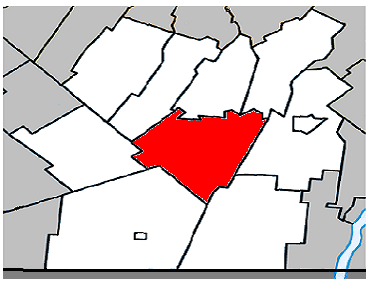
- Location within Les Jardins-de-Napierville RCM

- Location in southern Quebec
- Coordinates: 45°10′N 73°31′W
- Country: Canada
- Province: Quebec
- Region: Montérégie
- RCM: Les Jardins-de-Napierville
- Constituted: July 1, 1855

Government
  - Mayor: Yves Boyer
  - Federal riding: Châteauguay–Lacolle
  - Prov. riding: Huntingdon

Area
  - Total: 92.44 km^{2} (35.69 sq mi)
  - Land: 92.55 km^{2} (35.73 sq mi)
- There is an apparent contradiction between two authoritative sources.

Population (2021)
  - Total: 1,963
  - Density: 21.2/km^{2} (55/sq mi)
  - Pop (2016-21): ▲0.2%
  - Dwellings: 805
- Time zone: UTC−5 (EST)
  - Summer (DST): UTC−4 (EDT)
- Postal code(s): J0L 2N0
- Area codes: 450 and 579
- Highways A-15: R-219 R-221
- Geocode: 68025
- Website: www.st-patrice- sherrington.com

Saint-Patrice-de-Sherrington is a municipality in Les Jardins-de-Napierville Regional County Municipality in Quebec, Canada, situated in the Montérégie administrative region. The population as of the 2021 Canadian census was 1,963.

== Demographics ==
=== Population ===
Canada census – Saint-Patrice-de-Sherrington community profile

	2021	2016	2011
Population	1,963 (+0.2% from 2016)	1,960 (-0.6% from 2011)	1,971 (+3.1% from 2006)
Land area	92.55 km^{2} (35.73 sq mi)	92.62 km^{2} (35.76 sq mi)	92.65 km^{2} (35.77 sq mi)
Population density	21.2/km^{2} (55/sq mi)	21.2/km^{2} (55/sq mi)	21.3/km^{2} (55/sq mi)
Median age	43.2 (M: 43.6, F: 42.4)	42.2 (M: 42.3, F: 41.8)	41.0 (M: 40.6, F: 41.3)
Private dwellings	805 (total) 769 (occupied)	808 (total)	769 (total)
Median household income	$78,500	$63,488	$53,631

References: 2021 2016 2011

Historical Census Data - Saint-Patrice-de-Sherrington, Quebec

Year	Pop.	±%
1871	2,035	—
1881	1,838	−9.7%
1891	1,815	−1.3%
1901	1,410	−22.3%
1911	1,370	−2.8%
1921	1,436	+4.8%
1931	1,162	−19.1%
1941	1,302	+12.0%

Year	Pop.	±%
1951	1,310	+0.6%
1956	1,465	+11.8%
1961	1,565	+6.8%
1966	1,819	+16.2%
1971	1,843	+1.3%
1976	1,877	+1.8%
1981	1,996	+6.3%
1986	1,916	−4.0%

Year	Pop.	±%
1991	1,952	+1.9%
1996	1,960	+0.4%
2001	1,915	−2.3%
2006	1,911	−0.2%
2011	1,971	+3.1%
2016	1,960	−0.6%
2021	1,963	+0.2%

Source: Statistics Canada

=== Language ===
Canada Census Mother Tongue - Saint-Patrice-de-Sherrington, Quebec
Census	Total	French			English			French & English			Other		
Year	Responses	Count	Trend	Pop %	Count	Trend	Pop %	Count	Trend	Pop %	Count	Trend	Pop %
2021	1,960	1,775	▲2.0%	90.6%	55	0.0%	2.8%	40	▲166.7%	2.0%	75	▼50.0%	3.8%
2016	1,960	1,740	▼4.9%	88.8%	55	▲22.2%	2.8%	15	0.0%	0.8%	150	▲100.0%	7.7%
2011	1,965	1,830	▲8.3%	93.1%	45	▲28.6%	2.3%	15	▲50.0%	0.8%	75	▼55.9%	3.8%
2006	1,905	1,690	▼3.7%	88.7%	35	▼30.0%	2.1%	10	▼33.3%	0.5%	170	▲88.9%	8.9%
2001	1,910	1,755	▼0.8%	91.9%	50	▼33.3%	2.6%	15	▲ n/a%	0.8%	90	▼18.2%	4.7%
1996	1,955	1,770	n/a	90.5%	75	n/a	3.8%	0	n/a	0.0%	110	n/a	5.6%

== Education ==
The South Shore Protestant Regional School Board previously served the municipality.

== See also ==
- Rivière de la Tortue (Delson)
- List of municipalities in Quebec
