= Bondi Beach (Whiteley) =

1992 painting by Brett Whiteley

- Artist: Brett Whiteley
- Year: 1992
- Type: Pen, charcoal, collage, paint and pencils on canvas on hardborad
- Dimensions: 213 cm × 730 cm (84 in × 290 in)
- Location: Private collection, Sydney

Bondi Beach—also known as Unfinished Beach Polyptych—is a 1992 painting by Australian artist Brett Whiteley. The painting is a six-panel work depicting the eponymous Bondi Beach in Sydney. The work was unfinished at the time of his death in 1992.

"When Brett started to do this he had the idea in mind and he talked about it extensively,"

"It was going to be Australia from the beach to Uluru but if he continued with it this size, the painting would have been eight miles (13 km) long with 1000 panels.

"He kept putting up the panels and extending the beach. In a way it's unfinished and in a way it's finished."

— Wendy Whiteley,

The work appeared in an exhibition at Hazelhurst Regional Gallery and Arts Centre in 2012: Brett Whiteley: On The Water

The painting was purchased in a private sale from Whiteley's estate in 2015 by a private collector who hangs the work in his private residence. The purchaser did not disclose the price but claimed it was greater than any known price for an Australian painting at the time.
