= John Adrian Bondy =

British-Canadian mathematician

- Born: 1944 (age 81–82); London, England
- Citizenship: British, Canadian
- Education: University of Oxford
- Occupation: Professor
- Known for: Bondy's theorem Bondy–Chvátal theorem
- Scientific career
- Fields: Combinatorics; Graph theory; Computer science; Mathematics
- Workplaces: University of Waterloo; Université Lyon 1; Université Paris VI
- Thesis: Some uniqueness theorems in graph theory (1968)
- Doctoral advisor: Dominic Welsh

John Adrian Bondy (born 1944) is a retired English mathematician, known for his work in combinatorics and graph theory.

== Career ==
Bondy received his Ph.D. in graph theory from the University of Oxford in 1969. His advisor was Dominic Welsh. Between 1969 and 1994, Bondy was Professor of Graph Theory at the University of Waterloo in Canada, and then, until his retirement, at Université Lyon 1 in France. From 1976, he was managing editor, and, between 1979 and 2004, co-editor-in-chief (together with U. S. R. Murty) of Journal of Combinatorial Theory, Series B. Throughout his career, Bondy has (co-)authored over 100 publications with 51 co-authors, including the widely influential textbook Graph Theory with Applications (with U. S. R. Murty), and supervised 12 Ph.D. students. His Erdős number is 1.

Bondy was dismissed from his tenured position at the University of Waterloo in 1995, after 25 years in which he had been a major contributor to the renown of the University's Department of Combinatorics and Optimization. The reasons for his dismissal centered on "Bondy's acceptance of a teaching post in France, and the acceptability of someone who is on UW's faculty payroll holding a full-time job elsewhere." Protesting the decision, Paul Erdős returned his honorary doctorate to the University of Waterloo, and Vašek Chvátal resigned from his position of Adjunct Professor at the Department of Combinatorics and Optimization.

== Personal life ==
Bondy has a passion for photography, having taken pictures since his childhood. In the 1980s, he regularly exhibited his work, most notably at the Kitchener-Waterloo Art Gallery in Kitchener, Ontario. In 2010, Bondy founded the non-profit association Mind's Eye with the aim "to reflect upon the conceptual links between mathematics and photography." In 2012, he opened a photo gallery with the same name on the Rue Saint-Jacques, Paris. Between 2012 and 2022, Mind's Eye / Galerie Adrian Bondy has hosted 42 exhibitions with works of 27 artists, including John Claridge and Jean Dréville.

== Selected publications ==
- Bondy, J. A.; Chvátal, V. (1976), "A method in graph theory", Discrete Mathematics, 15 (2): 111–135, doi:10.1016/0012-365X(76)90078-9, MR 0414429, Zbl 0331.05138.
- Bondy, J. A.; Murty, U. S. R. (1976), Graph Theory with Applications, North-Holland, MR 0411988, Zbl 1226.05083, archived from the original on 16 June 2012.
- Bondy, J. A.; Murty, U. S. R. (2008), Graph Theory, Springer, MR 2368647, Zbl 1134.05001.
- Bondy, J. A. (1971), "Pancyclic graphs I", Journal of Combinatorial Theory, Series B, 11 (1): 80–84, doi:10.1016/0095-8956(71)90016-5, MR 0285424, Zbl 0183.52301.
- Bondy, J. A.; Hemminger, R. L. (1977), "Graph reconstruction – a survey", Journal of Graph Theory, 1 (3): 227–268, doi:10.1002/jgt.3190010306, MR 0480189, Zbl 0375.05040.

== See also ==
- Bondy's theorem
- Bondy–Chvátal theorem
- Even circuit theorem
- Hypohamiltonian graph
- Pancyclic graph
