= Joseph Bondy, dit Douaire =

Canadian politician

Joseph Bondy, dit Douaire (February 6, 1770 – October 17, 1832) was a merchant and political figure in Quebec. He represented Warwick in the Legislative Assembly of Lower Canada from 1816 to 1820. His name also appears as Joseph Bondy or Joseph Bondy Douaire.

He was born in Verchères, Quebec, the son of Jean-Baptiste Bondy and Élisabeth Coursolle, and became a merchant at Berthier. He served as a justice of the peace, commissioner responsible for recording the oath of allegiance and commissioner for internal communications in Berthier County. Bondy dit Douaire was married twice: to Marie-Anne Falardeau in 1795 and to Marie-Claire Fauteux in 1813. He was defeated when he ran for reelection in 1820. He died at Berthier at the age of 62.

His daughter Marie-Joséphine-Valérie married Louis-Joseph Moll, who later served in the Quebec assembly.
