= Simon Bondi =

Lexicographer of the Talmud

- Born: 1774
- Died: 20 December 1816 (aged 41–42) Dresden, Kingdom of Saxony, German Confederation
- Literary movement: Haskalah

Simon Bondi (Yiddish: שמעון באנדי, romanized: Shimʻon Bondi; 1774 – 20 December 1816) was a German maskil and lexicographer of the Talmud.

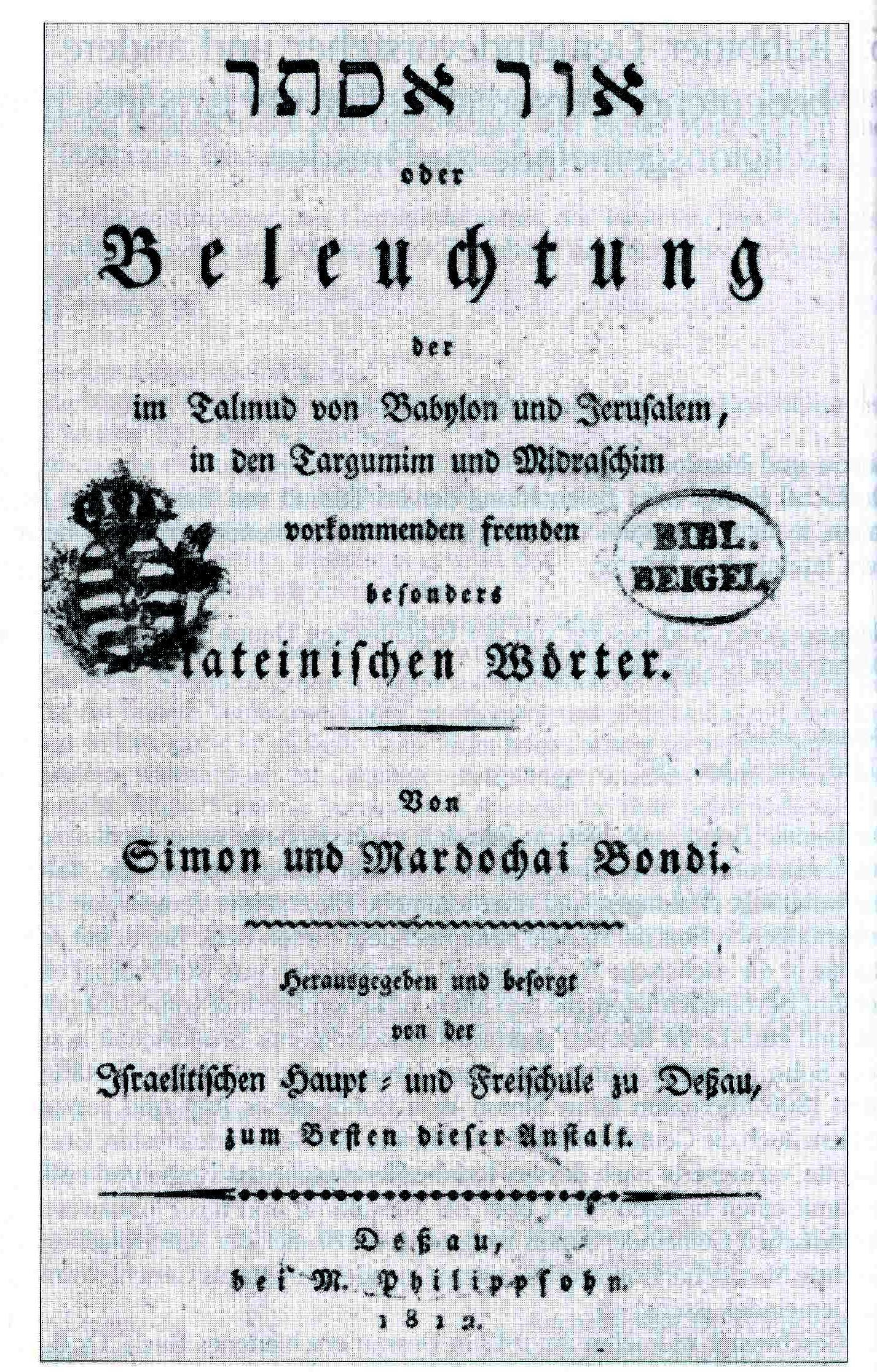
Title page of Or Ester (1812).

He wrote, together with his brother Mordecai (Marcus), the Or Ester ('Light of Esther'), a Hebrew dictionary of the Latin words occurring in the Talmud, targumim and midrashim (Dessau, 1812). They also wrote a similar work on the Greek words, which was never printed. The periodical Jedidja (i. 117–125) contains a biographical obituary of Simon by his brother Mordecai.

Bondi was related to the author Bernhard Beer and the court factor and banker Simon Isaac Bondi. His sister Sophie married into the Warburg family of Hamburg.

== Bibliography ==
- Or Esther, oder Beleuchtung der im Talmud von Babylon und Jerusalem in den Targumim und Midraschim vorkommenden fremden besonders lateinischen Wörter (PDF) (in Hebrew and German). Dessau: M. Philippsohn. 1812.
