= Jonas Bondi =

German-American rabbi and newspaper editor (1804-1874)

Jonas Bondi (July 9, 1804 – March 11, 1874) was a German-American rabbi and newspaper editor.

== Life ==
Bondi was born on July 9, 1804, in Dresden, Saxony. He was a descendent of Jonathan Eybeschutz.

Bondi received a theological education and attended the University of Prague. He then worked in his father's business for many years. But when his business failed, he immigrated to America with his wife and daughters. Rabbi Nathan Adler, the Chief Rabbi of Great Britain and one of Bondi's former teachers, gave a recommendation on the basis of his Jewish knowledge. The recommendation made its way to the officers of Ansche Chesed in New York City, and in 1858 he was made Preacher and Chief Rabbi of the congregation. He left Ansche Chesed in 1859 after only 14 months there.

Bondi then began holding public divine services at the Cooper Institute. In 1860, he became minister of the newly-organized Amunai Israel, which met at the Cooper Institute. In 1863, he began assisting Isaac Leeser in publishing The Occident and American Jewish Advocate. In 1865, he became editor of The Hebrew Leader, which was previously known as The Jewish Record, and was published in English and German. He owned and edited the paper for the rest of his life. He wrote a series of articles in The Hebrew Leader called "Jonathi bechagve hasela" (Dove in the Cleft of the Rock), which dealt with permission to erect a monument of a benefactor in a synagogue. He was also prominently connected with various Jewish charitable organizations.

Bondi was a member of the conservative-historical school and a moderate in theology and practice. He balked at radical changes advocated by Reform leaders. His wife conducted a private school for girls. His daughter Selma was Rabbi Isaac Mayer Wise's second wife.

Bondi died on March 11, 1874. He was buried in Cypress Hills Cemetery.
