= Napierville (provincial electoral district) =

Coordinates: 45.18°N 73.40°W

Quebec electoral district

Defunct provincial electoral district
- Legislature: National Assembly of Quebec
- District created: 1867
- District abolished: 1922
- First contested: 1867
- Last contested: 1919

Napierville (French pronunciation: [napjɛʁvil]) was a provincial electoral district in the Montérégie region of Quebec, Canada.

It was created for the 1867 election (and an electoral district of that name existed earlier in the Legislative Assembly of the Province of Canada). Its final election was in 1919. It disappeared in the 1923 election and its successor electoral district was Napierville-Laprairie.

== Members of the Legislative Assembly ==
- Pierre Benoit, Liberal (1867–1870)
- Laurent-David Lafontaine, Liberal (1870–1881)
- François-Xavier Paradis, Conservative Party (1881–1886)
- Eugène Lafontaine, Liberal (1886–1890)
- Louis Sainte-Marie, Liberal – Conservative Party (1890–1897)
- Cyprien Dorris, Liberal (1897–1904)
- Dominique Monet, Liberal (1904–1905)
- Cyprien Dorris, Liberal (1905–1918)
- Amédée Monet, Liberal (1918–1923)
