= Curt W. Bondy =

German psychologist and social educator (1894–1972)

Curt Werner Bondy
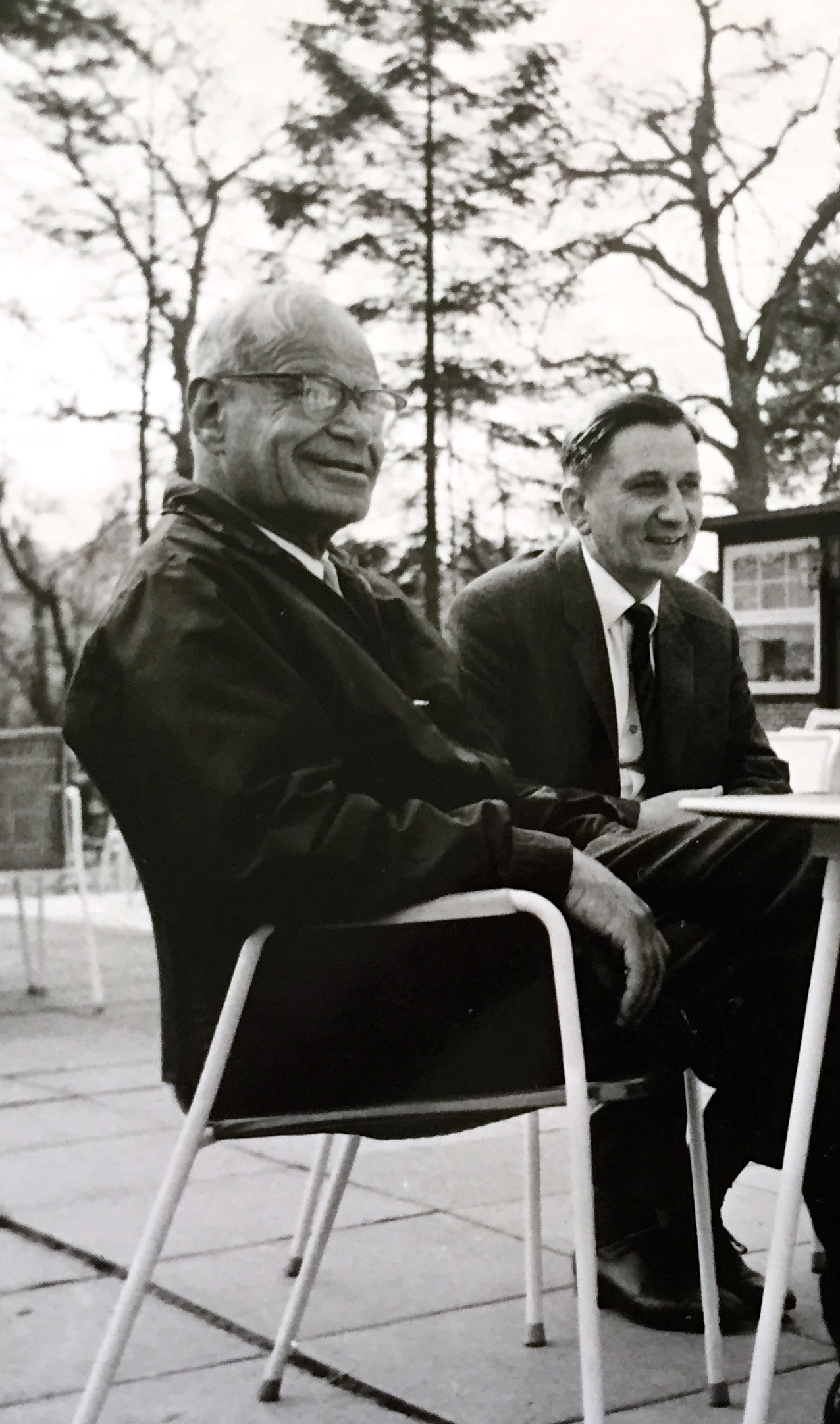
- Born: 3 April 1894
- Died: 17 January 1972 (aged 77)
- Occupations: Psychologist, Educator

Curt Werner Bondy (3 April 1894 in Hamburg, Germany – 17 January 1972) was a German psychologist and social educator.

== Literary works ==
- Pädagogische Problem im Jugendstrafvollzug, 1925
- Problems of Internment Camps, Journal of Abnormal and Social Psychology, 1943.
- Bindungslose Jugend, 1952
