= Ottilie Bondy =

Austrian woman activist

Ottilie Bondy, née Jeitteles (26 July 1832 – 5 December 1921) was an Austrian women's rights activist and women's association official.

== Life ==
Born in Brno, Bondy was the daughter of Johanna Jeitteles, née Brüll, and the Jewish doctor, writer and editor Alois Jeitteles. In 1856, she married the merchant and factory owner Israel Bondy (later Ignaz Bondy). After their marriage in Brno, the couple moved to Vienna. Their first-born child was son Ernst, Alois' second son. In 1868, their daughter Helene Bondy († 1954) was born, whom she initially taught herself. Her daughter was the first teacher in Austria to pass the specialist examination for teaching the blind, and in 1897 she married the German writer and journalist Hanns von Gumppenberg. From 1872 to 1878, Ottilie was a member of the board of the Israelitische Kinderbewahranstalt in Vienna. Together with Johanna Meynert (1837–1879) and the journalist Adolf Taussig (1838–1903), she founded the Vienna Housewives' Association in 1875 and was its president from 1879 after Johanna Meynert's death until 1909. She supported the "I. Bildungsanstalt für Kindergärtnerinnen in Wien", ran the "Israelitisches Mädchen-Waisenhaus" and was one of the founders of the "Schulverein für Beamtentöchter". She was chairwoman of the "Caritas" association and directed the servants' asylum in Favoriten, which had been founded at the end of the 1880s. She gave lectures at the Viennese People's Education Association from 1883 and campaigned for women's issues in a series of publications. She published Haushaltungs- und Merkbuch, Zehn Gebote des Hauswesens, Haus- und Familienbuch, Die Beschäftigung des Kindes and Die Theorie und Praxis auf häuslichem Gebiet (1883). In 1893, she represented the Vienna Association for Kindergarten Education at the World's Columbian Exposition. In December 1893, her husband died and was buried in the Jewish cemetery of Wällischbirken.

In 1902, she converted from the Jewish faith to the Protestant Church. The Ottilie Bondy Foundation was established in her honour on the occasion of her 70th birthday.

In 1909, she moved to her daughter Helene in Munich, where she died in 1921, aged 89.

In 2016, the Ottilie-Bondy-Promenade was named after her in Vienna's 21st district Floridsdorf.
