= Louis Sainte-Marie =

Canadian politician

Louis Sainte-Marie (April 30, 1835 – March 12, 1916) was a Quebec merchant and political figure. He represented Napierville in the House of Commons of Canada from 1887 to 1890 as a Liberal member and Napierville in the Legislative Assembly of Quebec from 1890 to 1897 as a Liberal and then Conservative member.

He was born in St-Constant, Lower Canada, the son of Louis Sainte-Marie and Rose Dupuis. Saint-Marie was educated at Beauharnois and entered business as a merchant at Saint-Rémi. He was a captain in the militia, serving during the Fenian raids. In 1861, he married Précille Caron. Sainte-Marie served on the town council for Saint-Rémi and was mayor from 1877 to 1882. In 1890, he resigned his seat in the House of Commons and was elected to the Quebec assembly as a Liberal. He was elected as a Conservative in 1892; Sainte-Marie was defeated when he ran for reelection in 1897. He died in Saint-Rémi at the age of 80.

== Electoral record ==
1887 Canadian federal election: Napierville
Party	Candidate	Votes
Liberal	Louis Sainte-Marie	908
Conservative	François-Xavier Paradis	687
