= Saint-Édouard, Quebec =

Saint-Édouard
- Municipality
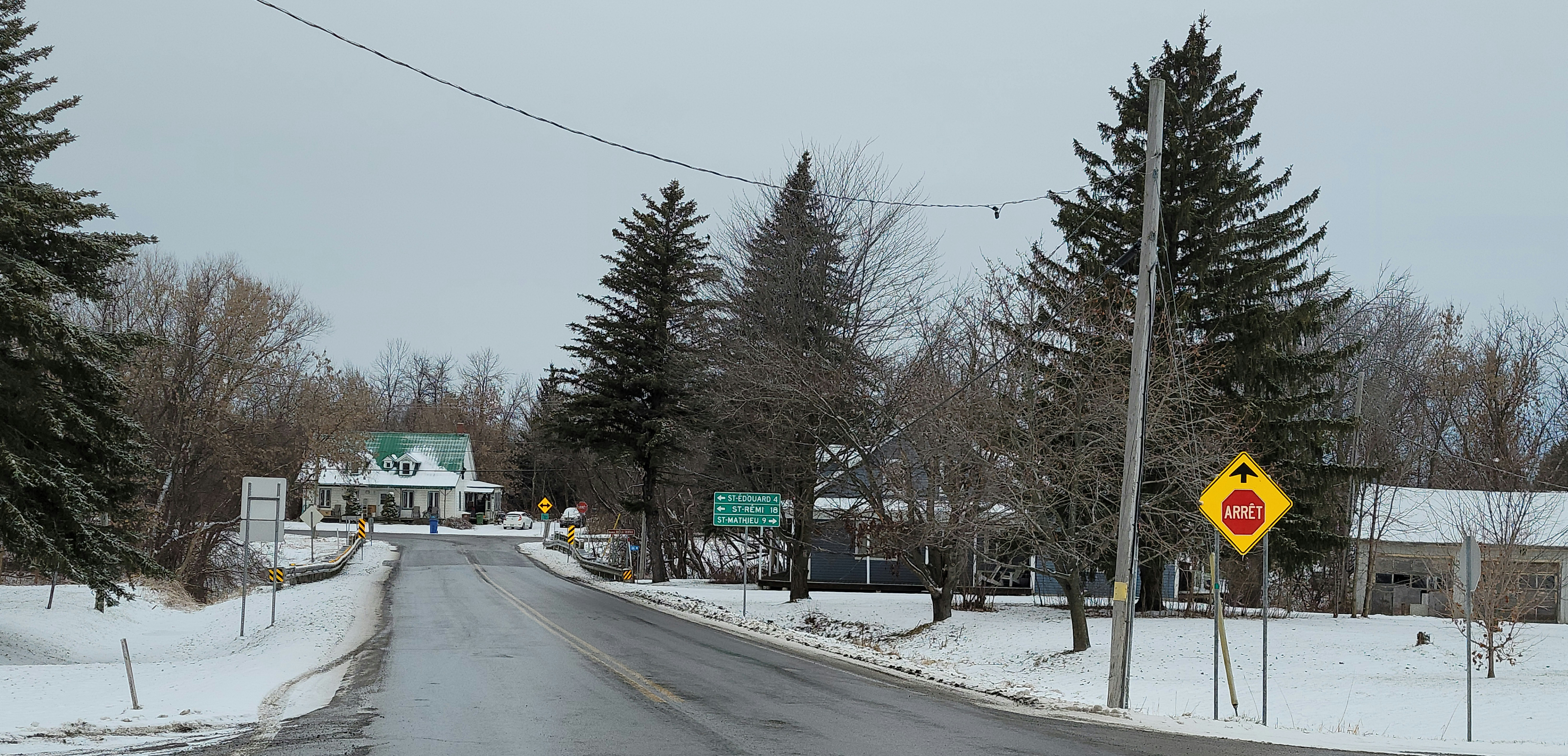

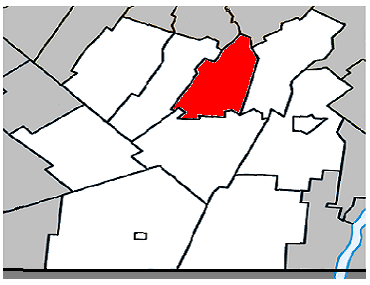
- Location within Les Jardins-de-Napierville RCM

- Location in southern Quebec
- Coordinates: 45°14′N 73°31′W
- Country: Canada
- Province: Quebec
- Region: Montérégie
- RCM: Les Jardins-de-Napierville
- Constituted: July 1, 1855

Government
  - Mayor: Alexandre Bastien
  - Federal riding: Beauharnois—Salaberry
  - Prov. riding: Huntingdon

Area
  - Total: 52.50 km^{2} (20.27 sq mi)
  - Land: 52.68 km^{2} (20.34 sq mi)
- There is an apparent contradiction between two authoritative sources.

Population (2021)
  - Total: 1,365
  - Density: 25.9/km^{2} (67/sq mi)
  - Pop (2016-21): ▲3.3%
  - Dwellings: 548
- Time zone: UTC−5 (EST)
  - Summer (DST): UTC−4 (EDT)
- Postal code(s): J0L 1Y0
- Area codes: 450 and 579
- Highways A-15: R-221
- Website: www.saintedouard.ca

Saint-Édouard (French pronunciation: [sɛ̃t‿edwaʁ]) is a municipality in the Jardins de Napierville Regional County Municipality in Quebec, Canada, situated in the Montérégie administrative region. The population as of the 2021 Canadian census was 1,365.

== Demographics ==
=== Population ===
Canada census – Saint-Édouard community profile

	2021	2016	2011
Population	1,365 (+3.3% from 2016)	1,321 (+0.7% from 2011)	1,312 (+8.3% from 2006)
Land area	52.68 km^{2} (20.34 sq mi)	52.69 km^{2} (20.34 sq mi)	52.93 km^{2} (20.44 sq mi)
Population density	25.9/km^{2} (67/sq mi)	25.1/km^{2} (65/sq mi)	24.8/km^{2} (64/sq mi)
Median age	40.8 (M: 41.2, F: 40.4)	39.6 (M: 40.6, F: 38.8)	39.4 (M: 39.4, F: 39.3)
Private dwellings	548 (total) 515 (occupied)	542 (total) 514 (occupied)	536 (total)
Median household income	$91,000	$70,315	$52,596

References: 2021 2016 2011

Historical Census Data - Saint-Édouard, Quebec

Year	Pop.	±%
1921	1,070	—
1931	953	−10.9%
1941	960	+0.7%
1951	956	−0.4%
1956	970	+1.5%
1961	993	+2.4%

Year	Pop.	±%
1966	1,084	+9.2%
1971	1,101	+1.6%
1976	1,101	+0.0%
1981	1,170	+6.3%
1986	1,188	+1.5%
1991	1,251	+5.3%

Year	Pop.	±%
1996	1,257	+0.5%
2001	1,195	−4.9%
2006	1,212	+1.4%
2011	1,312	+8.3%
2016	1,321	+0.7%
2021	1,365	+3.3%

1976 Population count is adjusted for boundary changes.
Source: Statistics Canada

=== Language ===
Canada Census Mother Tongue - Saint-Édouard, Quebec
Census	Total	French			English			French & English			Other		
Year	Responses	Count	Trend	Pop %	Count	Trend	Pop %	Count	Trend	Pop %	Count	Trend	Pop %
2011	1,315	1,255	▲6.8%	95.44%	20	▲33.3%	1.52%	5	▲ n/a%	0.38%	35	▲40.0%	2.66%
2006	1,215	1,175	▼1.7%	96.71%	15	▲50.0%	1.23%	0	0.0%	0.00%	25	▲ n/a%	2.06%
2001	1,205	1,195	▼0.4%	99.17%	10	0.0%	0.83%	0	0.0%	0.00%	0	▼100.0%	0.00%
1996	1,245	1,200	n/a	96.39%	10	n/a	0.80%	0	n/a	0.00%	35	n/a	2.81%

== See also ==
- Rivière de la Tortue (Delson)
- List of municipalities in Quebec
