= By-elections to the 4th Canadian Parliament =

By-elections to the 4th Canadian Parliament were held to elect members of the House of Commons of Canada between the 1878 federal election and the 1882 federal election. The Conservative Party of Canada led a majority government for the 4th Canadian Parliament.

The list includes Ministerial by-elections which occurred due to the requirement at the time that Members of Parliament recontest their seats upon being appointed to Cabinet. These by-elections were almost always uncontested. This requirement was abolished in 1931.

By-election	Date	Incumbent	Party	Winner	Party	Cause	Retained
New Westminster	March 9, 1882	Thomas Robert McInnes	Independent	Joshua Homer	Liberal-Conservative	Called to the Senate.	No
Simcoe South	February 16, 1882	William Carruthers Little	Liberal-Conservative	Angus McIsaac	Conservative	Death	Yes
Northumberland West	December 19, 1881	James Cockburn	Conservative	George Guillet	Conservative	Appointed Chairman of the Commission to collect, examine and classify the Statutes passed by the Parliament of the Dominion of Canada, since Confederation	Yes
Argenteuil	August 17, 1881	John Joseph Caldwell Abbott	Liberal-Conservative	John Joseph Caldwell Abbott	Liberal-Conservative	Election declared void.	Yes
Pictor	June 18, 1881	James McDonald	Conservative	John McDougald	Liberal-Conservative	Appointed Chief Justice of the Supreme Court of Nova Scotia.	Yes
Colchester	June 18, 1881	Thomas McKay	Liberal-Conservative	Archibald McLelan	Conservative	Called to the Senate.	Yes
Colchester	March 31, 1881	Joshua Spencer Thompson	Liberal-Conservative	James Reid	Liberal-Conservative	Death	Yes
Northumberland East	March 25, 1881	Joseph Keeler	Liberal-Conservative	Darius Crouter	Independent Liberal	Death	No
Bellechasse	March 19, 1881	Achille Larue	Liberal	Guillaume Amyot	Conservative	Election declared void.	No
Charlevoix	March 19, 1881	Joseph-Stanislas Perrault	Conservative	Simon-Xavier Cimon	Conservative	Election declared void.	Yes
Carleton	February 16, 1881	George Heber Connell	Independent	David Irvine	Liberal	Death	No
Joliette	December 9, 1880	Louis François Georges Baby	Conservative	Lewis Arthur McConville	Conservative	Appointed a judge of the Superior Court of Quebec	Yes
Oxford North	December 9, 1880	Thomas Oliver	Liberal	James Sutherland	Liberal	Death	Yes
Montmorency	December 9, 1880	Auguste-Réal Angers	Conservative	Pierre-Vincent Valin	Conservative	Appointed a judge of the Superior Court of Quebec.	Yes
Quebec County	November 20, 1880	Adolphe-Philippe Caron	Conservative	Adolphe-Philippe Caron	Conservative	Recontested upon appointment as Minister of Militia and Defence.	Yes
Bagot	November 20, 1880	Joseph-Alfred Mousseau	Conservative	Joseph-Alfred Mousseau	Conservative	Recontested upon appointment as President of the Privy Council.	Yes
Brome	October 18, 1880	Edmund Leavens Chandler	Liberal	David Ames Manson	Liberal-Conservative	Death	No
Selkirk	September 10, 1880	Donald Smith	Independent Conservative	Thomas Scott	Conservative	Election declared void.	No
Ontario North	August 28, 1880	George Wheler	Liberal	George Wheler	Liberal	Election declared void.	Yes
West Toronto	August 28, 1880	John Beverly Robinson	Conservative	James Beaty, Jr.	Conservative	Appointed Lieutenant-Governor of Ontario.	Yes
Châteauguay	April 17, 1880	Luther Hamilton Holton	Liberal	Edward Holton	Liberal	Death	Yes
Montmorency	February 14, 1880	Pierre-Vincent Valin	Conservative	Auguste-Réal Angers	Conservative	Election declared void.	Yes
Argenteuil	February 12, 1880	Thomas Christie	Liberal	John Joseph Caldwell Abbott	Liberal-Conservative	Election declared void.	No
Cornwall	January 27, 1880	Darby Bergin	Liberal-Conservative	Darby Bergin	Liberal-Conservative	Election declared void.	Yes
Lanark North	January 22, 1880	Daniel Galbraith	Liberal	Donald Greenfield MacDonell	Liberal	Death	Yes
Provencher	December 30, 1879	Joseph Dubuc	Conservative	Joseph Royal	Conservative	Appointed a Judge of the Court of Queen's Bench for Manitoba.	Yes
Durham West	November 17, 1879	Harvey William Burk	Liberal	Edward Blake	Liberal	Resignation to provide a seat for Blake.	Yes
Cape Breton	October 23, 1879	Hugh McLeod	Liberal-Conservative	William Mackenzie McLeod	Liberal-Conservative	Death	Yes
Yale	September 29, 1879	Edgar Dewdney	Conservative	Francis Jones Barnard	Conservative	Appointed Indian Commissioner of Manitoba and the North West Territories.	Yes
Bonaventure	August 26, 1879	Théodore Robitaille	Conservative	Pierre-Clovis Beauchesne	Conservative	Appointed Lieutenant Governor of Quebec.	Yes
Yamaska	July 7, 1879	Charles-Ignace Gill	Conservative	Fabien Vanasse dit Vertefeuille	Conservative	Appointed a judge to the Quebec Superior Court.	Yes
Niagara	March 20, 1879	Patrick Hughes	Liberal	Josiah Burr Plumb	Conservative	Election declared void.	No
Hastings East	February 25, 1879	John White	Conservative	John White	Conservative	Election declared void.	Yes
Charlevoix	February 13, 1879	Pierre-Alexis Tremblay	Liberal	Joseph-Stanislas Perrault	Conservative	Death	No
Beauharnois	January 9, 1879	Michael Cayley	Conservative	Joseph Gédéon H. Bergeron	Conservative	Death	Yes
Marquette	November 30, 1878	John A. Macdonald	Liberal-Conservative	Joseph O'Connell Ryan	Liberal	MacDonald was elected in several seats simultaneously, resigned to run in Ministerial by-election in Victoria.	No
Three Rivers	November 21, 1878	William McDougall	Conservative	Hector-Louis Langevin	Conservative	Resignation to provide a seat for Langevin.	Yes
Joliette	November 14, 1878	Louis François Georges Baby	Conservative	Louis François Georges Baby	Conservative	Recontested upon appointment as Minister of Inland Revenue.	Yes
Queens County	November 9, 1878	James Colledge Pope	Conservative	James Colledge Pope	Conservative	Recontested upon appointment as Minister of Marine and Fisheries.	Yes
Hastings North	November 6, 1878	Mackenzie Bowell	Conservative	Mackenzie Bowell	Conservative	Recontested upon appointment as Minister of Customs.	Yes
Terrebonne	November 6, 1878	Louis-Rodrigue Masson	Conservative	Louis-Rodrigue Masson	Conservative	Recontested upon appointment as Minister of Militia and Defence.	Yes
City of St. John	November 4, 1878	Samuel Leonard Tilley	Liberal-Conservative	Samuel Leonard Tilley	Liberal-Conservative	Recontested upon appointment as Minister of Finance.	Yes
Pictou	November 4, 1878	James McDonald	Conservative	James McDonald	Conservative	Recontested upon appointment as Minister of Justice and Attorney General.	Yes
Russell	November 4, 1878	John O'Connor	Conservative	John O'Connor	Conservative	Recontested upon appointment as President of the Privy Council.	Yes
Compton	November 4, 1878	John Henry Pope	Liberal-Conservative	John Henry Pope	Liberal-Conservative	Recontested upon appointment as Minister of Agriculture.	Yes
Cumberland	November 4, 1878	Charles Tupper	Conservative	Charles Tupper	Conservative	Recontested upon appointment as Minister of Public Works.	Yes
Huron Centre	November 2, 1878	Horace Horton	Liberal	Richard John Cartwright	Liberal	Appointment in the office of the Auditor-General of Canada.	Yes

== See also ==
- List of federal by-elections in Canada

== Sources ==
- Parliament of Canada–Elected in By-Elections
