= 4th Canadian Parliament =

1879–1882 legislative term

- Majority parliament
- Feb. 13, 1879 – May. 18, 1882

Parliament leaders
- Prime minister: Rt. Hon. Sir John A. Macdonald; Oct. 17, 1878 – Jun. 6, 1891
- Cabinet: 3rd Canadian Ministry
- Leader of the Opposition: Alexander Mackenzie; 17 October 1878 – 27 April 1880
- Edward Blake; 4 May 1880 – 2 June 1887

Party caucuses
- Government: Conservative Party & Liberal-Conservative
- Opposition: Liberal Party

House of Commons
- Seating arrangements of the House of Commons
- Speaker of the Commons: Joseph Godéric Blanchet; 13 February 1879 – 7 February 1883
- Members: 206 seats MP seats List of members

Senate
- Speaker of the Senate: The Hon. Robert Duncan Wilmot; 7 November 1878 – 10 February 1880
- The Hon. Sir David Lewis Macpherson; 11 February 1880 – 15 February 1880
- Amos Edwin Botsford; 16 February 1880 – 18 April 1880
- The Hon. Sir David Lewis Macpherson; 19 April 1880 – 16 October 1883
- Government Senate leader: Alexander Campbell; 18 October 1878 – 26 January 1887
- Opposition Senate leader: Sir Richard William Scott; 8 October 1878 – 27 April 1896
- Senators: 79 seats senator seats List of senators

Sovereign
- Monarch: Victoria; 1 July 1867 – 22 Jan. 1901
- Governor general: The Earl of Dufferin; 25 June 1872 – 25 Nov. 1878
- The Duke of Argyll; 25 Nov. 1878 – 23 Oct. 1883

Sessions
- 1st session 13 February 1879 – 15 May 1879
- 2nd session 12 February 1880 – 7 May 1880
- 3rd session 9 December 1880 – 21 March 1881
- 4th session 9 February 1882 – 17 May 1882
| ← 3rd | → 5th |

The 4th Canadian Parliament was in session from 13 February 1879 until 18 May 1882 (3 years and 94 days). The membership was set by the 1878 federal election on 17 September 1878. It was dissolved prior to the 1882 election.

It was controlled by a Conservative/Liberal-Conservative majority under Prime Minister Sir John A. Macdonald and the 3rd Canadian Ministry. The Official Opposition was the Liberal Party, first led by Alexander Mackenzie, and then by Edward Blake.

The Speaker was Joseph Godéric Blanchet. See also List of Canadian electoral districts 1873-1882 for a list of the ridings in this parliament.

There were four sessions of the 4th Parliament:

| Session | Start | End |
|---|---|---|
| 1st | 13 February 1879 | 15 May 1879 |
| 2nd | 12 February 1880 | 7 May 1880 |
| 3rd | 9 December 1880 | 21 March 1881 |
| 4th | 9 February 1882 | 17 May 1882 |

== List of members ==
Following is a full list of members of the fourth parliament listed first by province, then by electoral district.

Key:

- Party leaders are italicized.
- Cabinet ministers are in **boldface**.
- The Prime Minister is **both**.
- The Speaker is indicated by "(†)".

Electoral districts denoted by an asterisk (*) indicates that district was represented by two members.

=== British Columbia ===
| Electoral district | Name | Party | First elected/previously elected | No. of terms |
|---|---|---|---|---|
| Cariboo | Joshua Spencer Thompson (acclaimed) (died in office 20 December 1880) | Liberal-Conservative | 1871 | 4th term |
| Cariboo | James Reid (from 31 March 1881) | Liberal-Conservative | 1881 | 1st term |
| New Westminster | Thomas Robert McInnes (until appointed to Senate 24 December 1881) | Independent | 1878 | 1st term |
| New Westminster | Joshua Homer (acclaimed) (from 9 March 1882) | Liberal-Conservative | 1882 | 1st term |
| Vancouver | Arthur Bunster | Liberal | 1874 | 2nd term |
| Victoria* | Sir **John A. Macdonald** | Liberal-Conservative | 1867 | 4th term |
| Victoria* | Amor De Cosmos | Liberal | 1871 | 4th term |
| Yale | Edgar Dewdney (acclaimed) (resigned 30 May 1879 to become Indian Commissioner of Manitoba and the North West Territories) | Conservative | 1872 | 3rd term |
| Yale | Francis Jones Barnard (from 29 September 1879) | Conservative | 1879 | 1st term |

=== Manitoba ===
| Electoral district | Name | Party | First elected/previously elected | No. of terms |
|---|---|---|---|---|
| Lisgar | John Christian Schultz (acclaimed) | Conservative | 1871 | 4th term |
| Marquette | Sir John A. Macdonald (acclaimed) | Liberal-Conservative | 1867 | 4th term |
| Marquette | Joseph O'Connell Ryan (acclaimed) (from 30 November 1878) | Liberal | 1874 | 2nd term |
| Provencher | Joseph Dubuc (acclaimed) | Conservative | 1878 | 1st term |
| Provencher | Joseph Royal (from 30 December 1879) | Conservative | 1879 | 1st term |
| Selkirk | Donald A. Smith | Conservative | 1871 | 4th term |
| Selkirk | Thomas Scott (from 10 September 1880) | Conservative | 1880 | 1st term |

=== New Brunswick ===
| Electoral district | Name | Party | First elected/previously elected | No. of terms |
|---|---|---|---|---|
| Albert | Alexander Rogers | Liberal | 1878 | 1st term |
| Carleton | George Heber Connell | Independent | 1878 | 1st term |
| Carleton | David Irvine (from 16 February 1881) | Liberal | 1881 | 1st term |
| Charlotte | Arthur Hill Gillmor | Liberal | 1874 | 2nd term |
| City and County of St. John* | Isaac Burpee | Liberal | 1872 | 3rd term |
| City and County of St. John* | Charles Wesley Weldon | Liberal | 1878 | 1st term |
| City of St. John | **Samuel Leonard Tilley** (acclaimed), (re-elected 4 November 1878) | Liberal-Conservative | 1873, 1878 | 2nd term* |
| Gloucester | Timothy Warren Anglin (acclaimed) | Liberal | 1867 | 4th term |
| Kent | Gilbert Anselme Girouard | Liberal-Conservative | 1878 | 1st term |
| King's | James Domville | Conservative | 1872 | 3rd term |
| Northumberland | Jabez Bunting Snowball | Liberal | 1878 | 1st term |
| Queen's | George Gerald King | Liberal | 1878 | 1st term |
| Restigouche | George Haddow (acclaimed) | Independent | 1878 | 1st term |
| Sunbury | Charles Burpee | Liberal | 1867 | 4th term |
| Victoria | **John Costigan** | Liberal-Conservative | 1867 | 4th term |
| Westmorland | Albert James Smith | Liberal | 1867 | 4th term |
| York | John Pickard | Independent Liberal | 1868 | 4th term |

=== Nova Scotia ===
| Electoral district | Name | Party | First elected/previously elected | No. of terms |
|---|---|---|---|---|
| Annapolis | Avard Longley | Conservative | 1878 | 1st term |
| Antigonish | Angus McIsaac | Liberal | 1873 | 3rd term |
| Cape Breton* | Hugh McLeod (died in office 5 August 1879) | Liberal-Conservative | 1878 | 1st term |
| Cape Breton* | William McDonald | Conservative | 1872 | 3rd term |
| Cape Breton* | William Mackenzie McLeod (from 23 October 1879) | Liberal-Conservative | 1879 | 1st term |
| Colchester | Thomas McKay | Liberal-Conservative | 1874 | 2nd term |
| Colchester | **Archibald McLelan** (from 18 June 1881) | Conservative | 1881 | 1st term |
| Cumberland | **Charles Tupper** (acclaimed) (re-elected in by-election 4 November 1878) | Conservative | 1867 | 4th term |
| Digby | John Chipman Wade | Conservative | 1878 | 1st term |
| Guysborough | Alfred Ogden | Conservative | 1878 | 1st term |
| Halifax* | Matthew Henry Richey | Liberal-Conservative | 1878 | 1st term |
| Halifax* | Malachy Bowes Daly | Liberal-Conservative | 1878 | 1st term |
| Hants | William Henry Allison | Conservative | 1878 | 1st term |
| Inverness | Samuel McDonnell | Liberal | 1872 | 3rd term |
| Kings | Frederick William Borden | Liberal | 1874 | 2nd term |
| Lunenburg | Charles Edwin Kaulbach | Conservative | 1878 | 1st term |
| Pictou* | **James McDonald** (acclaimed in by-election 4 November 1878, ended term 19 May 1881) | Conservative | 1872, 1878 | 2nd term* |
| Pictou* | Robert Doull | Liberal-Conservative | 1872, 1878 | 2nd term* |
| Pictou* | John McDougald (acclaimed from 18 June 1881) | Liberal-Conservative | 1881 | 1st term |
| Queens | Silas Tertius Rand Bill | Liberal-Conservative | 1878 | 1st term |
| Richmond | Edmund Power Flynn | Liberal | 1874 | 2nd term |
| Shelburne | Thomas Robertson | Liberal | 1878 | 1st term |
| Victoria | Duncan McDonald | Liberal | 1878 | 1st term |
| Yarmouth | Frank Killam | Liberal | 1868 | 4th term |

=== Ontario ===
| Electoral district | Name | Party | First elected/previously elected | No. of terms |
|---|---|---|---|---|
| Addington | John McRory | Conservative | 1878 | 1st term |
| Algoma | Simon James Dawson | Conservative | 1878 | 1st term |
| Bothwell | David Mills | Liberal | 1867 | 4th term |
| Brant North | Gavin Fleming | Liberal | 1872 | 3rd term |
| Brant South | William Paterson | Liberal | 1872 | 3rd term |
| Brockville | William Fitzsimmons | Conservative | 1878 | 1st term |
| Bruce North | John Gillies | Liberal | 1872 | 3rd term |
| Bruce South | Alexander Shaw | Liberal-Conservative | 1878 | 1st term |
| Cardwell | Thomas White | Conservative | 1878 | 1st term |
| Carleton | John Rochester | Conservative | 1872 | 3rd term |
| Cornwall | Darby Bergin (re-elected in by-election 27 January 1880) | Liberal-Conservative | 1872, 1878 | 2nd term* |
| Dundas | John Sylvester Ross | Liberal-Conservative | 1867, 1878 | 2nd term* |
| Durham East | Arthur Trefusis Heneage Williams | Conservative | 1878 | 1st term |
| Durham West | Harvey William Burk (until 10 October 1879) | Liberal | 1874 | 2nd term |
| Durham West | Edward Dominick Blake (acclaimed from 17 November 1879) | Liberal | 1879 | 1st term |
| Elgin East | Thomas Arkell | Liberal-Conservative | 1878 | 1st term |
| Elgin West | George Elliott Casey | Liberal | 1872 | 3rd term |
| Essex | James Colebrooke Patterson | Conservative | 1878 | 1st term |
| Frontenac | George Airey Kirkpatrick | Conservative | 1870 | 4th term |
| Glengarry | John McLennan | Liberal-Conservative | 1878 | 1st term |
| Grenville South | John Philip Wiser | Liberal | 1878 | 1st term |
| Grey East | Thomas Simpson Sproule | Conservative | 1878 | 1st term |
| Grey North | Samuel Johnathan Lane | Conservative | 1878 | 1st term |
| Grey South | George Jackson | Liberal-Conservative | 1867, 1878 | 2nd term* |
| Haldimand | David Thompson | Liberal | 1867 | 4th term |
| Halton | William McDougall | Liberal-Conservative | 1867, (Note: Lanark North) 1878 | 2nd term* |
| Hamilton* | Francis Edwin Kilvert | Conservative | 1878 | 1st term |
| Hamilton* | Thomas Robertson | Liberal | 1878 | 1st term |
| Hastings East | John White (re-elected in by-election 25 February 1879) | Conservative | 1871 | 4th term |
| Hastings North | **Mackenzie Bowell** (acclaimed in by-election 6 November 1878) | Conservative | 1867 | 4th term |
| Hastings West | James Brown | Conservative | 1867 | 4th term |
| Huron Centre | Horace Horton (until 10 October 1878) | Liberal | 1872 | 3rd term |
| Huron Centre | Richard John Cartwright (from 2 November 1878) | Liberal | 1878 | 1st term |
| Huron North | Thomas Farrow | Liberal-Conservative | 1867 | 4th term |
| Huron South | Malcolm Colin Cameron | Liberal | 1867, 1878 | 4th term* |
| Kent | Rufus Stephenson | Conservative | 1867 | 4th term |
| Kingston | Alexander Gunn | Liberal | 1878 | 1st term |
| Lambton | Alexander Mackenzie | Liberal | 1867 | 4th term |
| Lanark North | Daniel Galbraith (died in office 17 December 1879) | Liberal | 1872 | 3rd term |
| Lanark North | Donald Greenfield MacDonell (from 22 January 1880) | Liberal | 1880 | 1st term |
| Lanark South | John Graham Haggart | Conservative | 1872 | 3rd term |
| Leeds North and Grenville North | Charles Frederick Ferguson | Liberal-Conservative | 1874 | 2nd term |
| Leeds South | David Ford Jones | Conservative | 1874 | 2nd term |
| Lennox | Edmund Hooper | Liberal-Conservative | 1878 | 1st term |
| Lincoln | John Charles Rykert | Conservative | 1878 | 1st term |
| London | **John Carling** | Liberal-Conservative | 1867, 1878 | 3rd term* |
| Middlesex East | Duncan Macmillan | Liberal-Conservative | 1875 | 2nd term |
| Middlesex North | Timothy Coughlin | Liberal-Conservative | 1878 | 1st term |
| Middlesex West | George William Ross | Liberal | 1872 | 3rd term |
| Monck | Lachlin McCallum | Liberal-Conservative | 1874 | 2nd term |
| Muskoka | Alexander Peter Cockburn | Liberal | 1872 | 3rd term |
| Niagara | Patrick Hughes (defeated in by-election 20 March 1879) | Liberal | 1878 | 1st term |
| Niagara | Josiah Burr Plumb (from 20 March 1879) | Conservative | 1879 | 1st term |
| Norfolk North | John Charlton | Liberal | 1872 | 3rd term |
| Norfolk South | William Wallace | Conservative | 1874 | 2nd term |
| Northumberland East | Joseph Keeler (died in office 21 January 1881) | Liberal-Conservative | 1867, 1878 | 3rd term* |
| Northumberland East | Darius Crouter (acclaimed from 25 March 1881) | Independent Liberal | 1881 | 1st term |
| Northumberland West | James Cockburn (until 14 November 1881) | Conservative | 1867, 1878 | 3rd term* |
| Northumberland West | George Guillet (from 19 December 1881) | Conservative | 1881 | 1st term |
| Ontario North | George Wheler (until 10 June 1880, re-elected 28 August 1880) | Liberal | 1878 | 1st term |
| Ontario South | Francis Wayland Glen | Liberal | 1878 | 1st term |
| Ottawa (City of)* | Joseph Merrill Currier | Liberal-Conservative | 1867 | 4th term |
| Ottawa (City of)* | Joseph Tassé | Conservative | 1878 | 1st term |
| Oxford North | Thomas Oliver (died in office 8 November 1880) | Liberal | 1867 | 4th term |
| Oxford North | James Sutherland (from 9 December 1880) | Liberal | 1880 | 1st term |
| Oxford South | James Atchison Skinner | Liberal | 1874 | 2nd term |
| Peel | William Elliott | Conservative | 1878 | 1st term |
| Perth North | Samuel Rollin Hesson | Conservative | 1878 | 1st term |
| Perth South | James Trow | Liberal | 1872 | 3rd term |
| Peterborough East | John Burnham | Conservative | 1878 | 1st term |
| Peterborough West | George Hilliard | Liberal-Conservative | 1878 | 1st term |
| Prescott | Félix Routhier | Conservative | 1878 | 1st term |
| Prince Edward | James Simeon McCuaig | Conservative | 1878 | 1st term |
| Renfrew North | Peter White | Conservative | 1876 | 2nd term |
| Renfrew South | William Bannerman | Conservative | 1878 | 1st term |
| Russell | **John O'Connor** (acclaimed in by-election 4 November 1878) | Conservative | 1867, 1878 | 3rd term* |
| Simcoe North | Dalton McCarthy | Conservative | 1872 | 3rd term |
| Simcoe South | William Carruthers Little (died in office 31 December 1881) | Liberal-Conservative | 1867 | 4th term |
| Simcoe South | Richard Tyrwhitt (acclaimed from 16 February 1882) | Conservative | 1882 | 1st term |
| Stormont | Oscar Fulton | Liberal-Conservative | 1878 | 1st term |
| Toronto Centre | Robert Hay | Liberal | 1878 | 1st term |
| Toronto East | Samuel Platt | Independent | 1875 | 2nd term |
| Victoria North | Hector Cameron | Conservative | 1875 | 2nd term |
| Victoria South | Arthur McQuade | Conservative | 1874 | 2nd term |
| Waterloo North | Hugo Kranz | Conservative | 1878 | 1st term |
| Waterloo South | Samuel Merner | Conservative | 1878 | 1st term |
| Welland | Christopher William Bunting | Liberal-Conservative | 1878 | 1st term |
| Wellington Centre | George Turner Orton | Liberal-Conservative | 1874 | 2nd term |
| Wellington North | George Alexander Drew | Liberal-Conservative | 1867, 1878 | 2nd term* |
| Wellington South | Donald Guthrie | Liberal | 1876 | 2nd term |
| Wentworth North | Thomas Bain | Liberal | 1872 | 3rd term |
| Wentworth South | Joseph Rymal | Liberal | 1867 | 4th term |
| West Toronto | John Beverley Robinson (until 30 June 1880) | Conservative | 1875 | 2nd term |
| West Toronto | James Beaty, Jr. (from 28 August 1880) | Conservative | 1880 | 1st term |
| York East | Alfred Boultbee | Conservative | 1878 | 1st term |
| York North | Frederick William Strange | Liberal-Conservative | 1878 | 1st term |
| York West | Nathaniel Clarke Wallace | Conservative | 1878 | 1st term |

=== Prince Edward Island ===
| Electoral district | Name | Party | First elected/previously elected | No. of terms |
|---|---|---|---|---|
| King's County* | Augustine Colin Macdonald | Liberal-Conservative | 1873, 1878 | 2nd term* |
| King's County* | Ephraim Bell Muttart | Conservative | 1878 | 1st term |
| Prince County* | James Yeo | Liberal | 1873 | 3rd term |
| Prince County* | Edward Hackett | Liberal-Conservative | 1878 | 1st term |
| Queen's County* | **James Colledge Pope** (acclaimed in by-election 9 November 1878) | Conservative | 1876 | 2nd term |
| Queen's County* | Frederick de Sainte-Croix Brecken | Conservative | 1878 | 1st term |

=== Quebec ===
| Electoral district | Name | Party | First elected/previously elected | No. of terms |
|---|---|---|---|---|
| Argenteuil | Thomas Christie (defeated in by-election 12 February 1880) | Liberal | 1875 | 2nd term |
| Argenteuil | John Joseph Caldwell Abbott (from 12 February 1880, acclaimed in by-election 17 August 1881) | Liberal-Conservative | 1867, 1880 | 4th term* |
| Bagot | **Joseph-Alfred Mousseau** (acclaimed in by-election 20 November 1880) | Conservative | 1874 | 2nd term |
| Beauce | Joseph Bolduc | Conservative | 1876 | 2nd term |
| Beauharnois | Michael Cayley (died in office 3 December 1878) | Conservative | 1867, 1878 | 2nd term* |
| Beauharnois | Joseph Gédéon Horace Bergeron (from 9 January 1879) | Conservative | 1879 | 1st term |
| Bellechasse | Achille Larue (until 11 February 1881) | Liberal | 1878 | 1st term |
| Bellechasse | Guillaume Amyot (from 19 March 1881) | Conservative | 1881 | 1st term |
| Berthier | Edward Octavian Cuthbert | Conservative | 1875 | 2nd term |
| Bonaventure | Théodore Robitaille | Conservative | 1867 | 4th term |
| Bonaventure | Pierre-Clovis Beauchesne (acclaimed from 26 August 1879) | Conservative | 1879 | 1st term |
| Brome | Edmund Leavens Chandler | Liberal | 1878 | 1st term |
| Brome | David Ames Manson (from 18 October 1880) | Liberal-Conservative | 1880 | 1st term |
| Chambly | Pierre Basile Benoit | Conservative | 1876 | 2nd term |
| Champlain | Hippolyte Montplaisir | Liberal-Conservative | 1874 | 2nd term |
| Charlevoix | Pierre Alexis Tremblay (died in office 5 January 1879) | Liberal | 1876 | 2nd term |
| Charlevoix | Joseph-Stanislas Perrault (from 13 February 1879) | Conservative | 1879 | 1st term |
| Charlevoix | Simon-Xavier Cimon (from 19 March 1881) | Conservative | 1881 | 1st term |
| Châteauguay | Luther Hamilton Holton (died in office 14 March 1880) | Liberal | 1867 | 4th term |
| Châteauguay | Edward Holton (from 17 April 1880) | Liberal | 1880 | 1st term |
| Chicoutimi—Saguenay | Marie Honorius Ernest Cimon | Conservative | 1874 | 2nd term |
| Compton | **John Henry Pope** (acclaimed in by-election 4 November 1878) | Liberal-Conservative | 1867 | 4th term |
| Dorchester | François Fortunat Rouleau | Liberal-Conservative | 1874 | 2nd term |
| Drummond – Arthabaska | Désiré Olivier Bourbeau | Conservative | 1877 | 2nd term |
| Gaspé | Pierre Fortin | Conservative | 1867, 1878 | 3rd term* |
| Hochelaga | Alphonse Desjardins | Conservative | 1874 | 2nd term |
| Huntingdon | Julius Scriver (acclaimed) | Liberal | 1869 | 4th term |
| Iverbville | François Béchard | Liberal | 1867 | 4th term |
| Jacques Cartier | Désiré Girouard | Conservative | 1878 | 1st term |
| Joliette | **Louis François Georges Baby** (acclaimed in by-election 14 November 1878) | Conservative | 1872 | 3rd term |
| Joliette | Lewis Arthur McConville (from 9 December 1880) | Conservative | 1880 | 1st term |
| Kamouraska | Joseph Dumont | Liberal | 1878 | 1st term |
| L'Assomption | Hilaire Hurteau | Liberal-Conservative | 1874 | 2nd term |
| L'Islet | Philippe Baby Casgrain | Liberal | 1872 | 3rd term |
| Laprairie | Alfred Pinsonneault | Conservative | 1867 | 4th term |
| Laval | Joseph-Aldric Ouimet (acclaimed) | Liberal-Conservative | 1873 | 3rd term |
| Lévis | Joseph-Goderic Blanchet (†) | Liberal-Conservative | 1867, 1878 | 3rd term* |
| Lotbinière | Côme Isaïe Rinfret | Liberal | 1878 | 1st term |
| Maskinongé | Frédéric Houde | Nationalist Conservative | 1878 | 1st term |
| Mégantic | Louis-Éphrem Olivier | Liberal | 1878 | 1st term |
| Missisquoi | George Barnard Baker | Liberal-Conservative | 1878 | 1st term |
| Montcalm | Firmin Dugas | Conservative | 1871 | 4th term |
| Montmagny | Auguste Charles Philippe Robert Landry | Conservative | 1878 | 1st term |
| Montmorency | Pierre-Vincent Valin (until 9 January 1880, re-elected 9 December 1880) | Conservative | 1878 | 1st term |
| Montmorency | Auguste-Réal Angers (from 14 February 1880 until 12 November 1880) | Conservative | 1880 | 1st term |
| Montreal Centre | Michael Patrick Ryan | Liberal-Conservative | 1868 | 4th term |
| Montreal East | Charles-Joseph Coursol | Conservative | 1878 | 1st term |
| Montreal West | Matthew Hamilton Gault | Conservative | 1878 | 1st term |
| Napierville | Sixte Coupal dit la Reine | Liberal | 1874 | 2nd term |
| Nicolet | François Xavier Ovide Méthot | Independent Conservative | 1877 | 2nd term |
| Ottawa (County of) | Alonzo Wright | Liberal-Conservative | 1867 | 4th term |
| Pontiac | John Poupore | Conservative | 1878 | 1st term |
| Portneuf | Roch-Pamphile Vallée | Conservative | 1878 | 1st term |
| Quebec County | **Joseph-Philippe-René-Adolphe Caron** (acclaimed in by-election 20 November 1880) | Conservative | 1873 | 3rd term |
| Quebec East | Wilfrid Laurier | Liberal | 1874 | 2nd term |
| Quebec West | Thomas McGreevy (acclaimed) | Liberal-Conservative | 1867 | 4th term |
| Quebec-Centre | Jacques Malouin | Independent | 1877 | 2nd term |
| Richelieu | Louis Huet Massue | Liberal-Conservative | 1878 | 1st term |
| Richmond—Wolfe | William Bullock Ives | Conservative | 1878 | 1st term |
| Rimouski | Jean-Baptiste Romuald Fiset | Liberal | 1872 | 3rd term |
| Rouville | George-Auguste Gigault | Conservative | 1878 | 1st term |
| Saint Maurice | Louis-Léon Lesieur Désaulniers | Conservative | 1867, 1878 | 2nd term* |
| Shefford | Lucius Seth Huntington | Liberal | 1867 | 4th term |
| Town of Sherbrooke | Edward Towle Brooks (acclaimed) | Conservative | 1872 | 3rd term |
| Soulanges | Jacques-Philippe Lanthier | Conservative | 1872 | 3rd term |
| St. Hyacinthe | Louis Tellier | Conservative | 1878 | 1st term |
| St. John's | François Bourassa | Liberal | 1867 | 4th term |
| Stanstead | Charles Carroll Colby | Liberal-Conservative | 1867 | 4th term |
| Témiscouata | Paul-Étienne Grandbois | Conservative | 1878 | 1st term |
| Terrebonne | **Louis-Rodrigue Masson** (acclaimed in by-election 6 November 1878) | Conservative | 1867 | 4th term |
| Three Rivers | William McDougall | Conservative | 1868 | 4th term |
| Three Rivers | **Hector-Louis Langevin** (acclaimed from 21 November 1878) | Conservative | 1867, (Note: Dorchester) 1876, (Note: Charlevoix) 1878 | 4th term* |
| Two Mountains | Jean-Baptiste Daoust | Conservative | 1876 | 2nd term |
| Vaudreuil | Jean-Baptiste Mongenais | Conservative | 1878 | 1st term |
| Verchères | Félix Geoffrion | Liberal | 1867 | 4th term |
| Yamaska | Charles Gill | Conservative | 1874 | 2nd term |
| Yamaska | Fabien Vanasse dit Vertefeuille (from 7 July 1879) | Conservative | 1879 | 1st term |

== By-elections ==
| By-election | Date | Incumbent | Party | Winner | Party | Cause | Retained |
|---|---|---|---|---|---|---|---|
| New Westminster | March 9, 1882 | Thomas Robert McInnes | Independent | Joshua Homer | Liberal-Conservative | Called to the Senate. | No |
| Simcoe South | February 16, 1882 | William Carruthers Little | Liberal-Conservative | Angus McIsaac | Conservative | Death | Yes |
| Northumberland West | December 19, 1881 | James Cockburn | Conservative | George Guillet | Conservative | Appointed Chairman of the Commission to collect, examine and classify the Statutes passed by the Parliament of the Dominion of Canada, since Confederation | Yes |
| Argenteuil | August 17, 1881 | John Joseph Caldwell Abbott | Liberal-Conservative | John Joseph Caldwell Abbott | Liberal-Conservative | Election declared void. | Yes |
| Pictor | June 18, 1881 | James McDonald | Conservative | John McDougald | Liberal-Conservative | Appointed Chief Justice of the Supreme Court of Nova Scotia. | Yes |
| Colchester | June 18, 1881 | Thomas McKay | Liberal-Conservative | Archibald McLelan | Conservative | Called to the Senate. | Yes |
| Colchester | March 31, 1881 | Joshua Spencer Thompson | Liberal-Conservative | James Reid | Liberal-Conservative | Death | Yes |
| Northumberland East | March 25, 1881 | Joseph Keeler | Liberal-Conservative | Darius Crouter | Independent Liberal | Death | No |
| Bellechasse | March 19, 1881 | Achille Larue | Liberal | Guillaume Amyot | Conservative | Election declared void. | No |
| Charlevoix | March 19, 1881 | Joseph-Stanislas Perrault | Conservative | Simon-Xavier Cimon | Conservative | Election declared void. | Yes |
| Carleton | February 16, 1881 | George Heber Connell | Independent | David Irvine | Liberal | Death | No |
| Joliette | December 9, 1880 | Louis François Georges Baby | Conservative | Lewis Arthur McConville | Conservative | Appointed a judge of the Superior Court of Quebec | Yes |
| Oxford North | December 9, 1880 | Thomas Oliver | Liberal | James Sutherland | Liberal | Death | Yes |
| Montmorency | December 9, 1880 | Auguste-Réal Angers | Conservative | Pierre-Vincent Valin | Conservative | Appointed a judge of the Superior Court of Quebec. | Yes |
| Quebec County | November 20, 1880 | Adolphe-Philippe Caron | Conservative | Adolphe-Philippe Caron | Conservative | Recontested upon appointment as Minister of Militia and Defence. | Yes |
| Bagot | November 20, 1880 | Joseph-Alfred Mousseau | Conservative | Joseph-Alfred Mousseau | Conservative | Recontested upon appointment as President of the Privy Council. | Yes |
| Brome | October 18, 1880 | Edmund Leavens Chandler | Liberal | David Ames Manson | Liberal-Conservative | Death | No |
| Selkirk | September 10, 1880 | Donald Smith | Independent Conservative | Thomas Scott | Conservative | Election declared void. | No |
| Ontario North | August 28, 1880 | George Wheler | Liberal | George Wheler | Liberal | Election declared void. | Yes |
| West Toronto | August 28, 1880 | John Beverly Robinson | Conservative | James Beaty, Jr. | Conservative | Appointed Lieutenant-Governor of Ontario. | Yes |
| Châteauguay | April 17, 1880 | Luther Hamilton Holton | Liberal | Edward Holton | Liberal | Death | Yes |
| Montmorency | February 14, 1880 | Pierre-Vincent Valin | Conservative | Auguste-Réal Angers | Conservative | Election declared void. | Yes |
| Argenteuil | February 12, 1880 | Thomas Christie | Liberal | John Joseph Caldwell Abbott | Liberal-Conservative | Election declared void. | No |
| Cornwall | January 27, 1880 | Darby Bergin | Liberal-Conservative | Darby Bergin | Liberal-Conservative | Election declared void. | Yes |
| Lanark North | January 22, 1880 | Daniel Galbraith | Liberal | Donald Greenfield MacDonell | Liberal | Death | Yes |
| Provencher | December 30, 1879 | Joseph Dubuc | Conservative | Joseph Royal | Conservative | Appointed a Judge of the Court of Queen's Bench for Manitoba. | Yes |
| Durham West | November 17, 1879 | Harvey William Burk | Liberal | Edward Blake | Liberal | Resignation to provide a seat for Blake. | Yes |
| Cape Breton | October 23, 1879 | Hugh McLeod | Liberal-Conservative | William Mackenzie McLeod | Liberal-Conservative | Death | Yes |
| Yale | September 29, 1879 | Edgar Dewdney | Conservative | Francis Jones Barnard | Conservative | Appointed Indian Commissioner of Manitoba and the North West Territories. | Yes |
| Bonaventure | August 26, 1879 | Théodore Robitaille | Conservative | Pierre-Clovis Beauchesne | Conservative | Appointed Lieutenant Governor of Quebec. | Yes |
| Yamaska | July 7, 1879 | Charles-Ignace Gill | Conservative | Fabien Vanasse dit Vertefeuille | Conservative | Appointed a judge to the Quebec Superior Court. | Yes |
| Niagara | March 20, 1879 | Patrick Hughes | Liberal | Josiah Burr Plumb | Conservative | Election declared void. | No |
| Hastings East | February 25, 1879 | John White | Conservative | John White | Conservative | Election declared void. | Yes |
| Charlevoix | February 13, 1879 | Pierre-Alexis Tremblay | Liberal | Joseph-Stanislas Perrault | Conservative | Death | No |
| Beauharnois | January 9, 1879 | Michael Cayley | Conservative | Joseph Gédéon H. Bergeron | Conservative | Death | Yes |
| Marquette | November 30, 1878 | John A. Macdonald | Liberal-Conservative | Joseph O'Connell Ryan | Liberal | MacDonald was elected in several seats simultaneously, resigned to run in Ministerial by-election in Victoria. | No |
| Three Rivers | November 21, 1878 | William McDougall | Conservative | Hector-Louis Langevin | Conservative | Resignation to provide a seat for Langevin. | Yes |
| Joliette | November 14, 1878 | Louis François Georges Baby | Conservative | Louis François Georges Baby | Conservative | Recontested upon appointment as Minister of Inland Revenue. | Yes |
| Queens County | November 9, 1878 | James Colledge Pope | Conservative | James Colledge Pope | Conservative | Recontested upon appointment as Minister of Marine and Fisheries. | Yes |
| Hastings North | November 6, 1878 | Mackenzie Bowell | Conservative | Mackenzie Bowell | Conservative | Recontested upon appointment as Minister of Customs. | Yes |
| Terrebonne | November 6, 1878 | Louis-Rodrigue Masson | Conservative | Louis-Rodrigue Masson | Conservative | Recontested upon appointment as Minister of Militia and Defence. | Yes |
| City of St. John | November 4, 1878 | Samuel Leonard Tilley | Liberal-Conservative | Samuel Leonard Tilley | Liberal-Conservative | Recontested upon appointment as Minister of Finance. | Yes |
| Pictou | November 4, 1878 | James McDonald | Conservative | James McDonald | Conservative | Recontested upon appointment as Minister of Justice and Attorney General. | Yes |
| Russell | November 4, 1878 | John O'Connor | Conservative | John O'Connor | Conservative | Recontested upon appointment as President of the Privy Council. | Yes |
| Compton | November 4, 1878 | John Henry Pope | Liberal-Conservative | John Henry Pope | Liberal-Conservative | Recontested upon appointment as Minister of Agriculture. | Yes |
| Cumberland | November 4, 1878 | Charles Tupper | Conservative | Charles Tupper | Conservative | Recontested upon appointment as Minister of Public Works. | Yes |
| Huron Centre | November 2, 1878 | Horace Horton | Liberal | Richard John Cartwright | Liberal | Appointment in the office of the Auditor-General of Canada. | Yes |
