= 6th Canadian Parliament =

1887–1891 national legislative term

- Majority parliament
- Apr. 7, 1887 – Feb. 3, 1891

Parliament leaders
- Prime minister: Rt. Hon. Sir John A. Macdonald; Oct. 17, 1878 – Jun. 6, 1891
- Cabinet: 3rd Canadian Ministry
- Leader of the Opposition: Wilfrid Laurier; 23 June 1887 – 10 July 1896

Party caucuses
- Government: Conservative Party & Liberal-Conservative
- Opposition: Liberal Party
- Crossbench: Nationalist Conservative

House of Commons
- Seating arrangements of the House of Commons
- Speaker of the Commons: George Airey Kirkpatrick; 8 February 1883 – 12 July 1887
- Joseph-Aldric Ouimet; 13 July 1887 – 28 July 1891
- Members: 215 MP seats List of members

Senate
- Speaker of the Senate: The Hon. Josiah Burr Plumb; 4 April 1887 – 12 March 1888
- The Hon. George Allan; 17 March 1888 – 26 April 1891
- Government Senate leader: vacant 7 April 1887 – 11 May 1887
- Sir John Joseph Caldwell Abbott; 12 May 1887 – 6 June 1891
- vacant 7 June 1891 – 15 June 1891
- Sir John Joseph Caldwell Abbott; 16 June 1891 – 30 October 1893
- Opposition Senate leader: Sir Richard William Scott; 8 October 1878 – 27 April 1896
- Senators: 81 senator seats List of senators

Sovereign
- Monarch: Victoria; 1 July 1867 – 22 Jan. 1901
- Governor general: The Marquess of Lansdowne; 23 Oct. 1883 – 11 June 1888
- The Earl of Derby; 11 June 1888 – 18 Sep. 1893

Sessions
- 1st session 13 April 1887 – 23 June 1887
- 2nd session 23 February 1888 – 22 May 1888
- 3rd session 31 January 1889 – 2 May 1889
- 4th session 16 January 1890 – 16 May 1890
| ← 5th | → 7th |

The 6th Canadian Parliament was in session from April 13, 1887, until February 3, 1891 (3 years and 296 days). The membership was set by the 1887 federal election on February 22, 1887. It was dissolved prior to the 1891 election.

It was controlled by a Conservative/Liberal-Conservative majority under Prime Minister Sir John A. Macdonald and the 3rd Canadian Ministry. The Official Opposition was the Liberal Party, led first by Edward Blake, and later by Wilfrid Laurier.

The Speaker was Joseph-Aldric Ouimet. See also List of Canadian electoral districts 1887-1892 for a list of the ridings in this parliament.

There were four sessions of the 6th Parliament:

| Session | Start | End |
|---|---|---|
| 1st | April 13, 1887 | June 23, 1887 |
| 2nd | February 23, 1888 | May 22, 1888 |
| 3rd | January 31, 1889 | May 2, 1889 |
| 4th | January 16, 1890 | May 16, 1890 |

== List of members ==
Following is a full list of members of the sixth Parliament listed first by province, then by electoral district.

Key:

- Party leaders are italicized.
- Cabinet ministers are in **boldface**.
- The Prime Minister is **both**.
- The Speaker is indicated by "(†)".

Electoral districts denoted by an asterisk (*) indicates that district was represented by two members.

=== British Columbia ===
| Electoral district | Name | Party | First elected/previously elected | No. of terms |
|---|---|---|---|---|
| Cariboo | James Reid (until appointed to Senate) | Liberal-Conservative | 1881 | 3rd term |
| Cariboo | Frank Stillman Barnard (by-election of 1888-11-22) | Conservative | 1888 | 1st term |
| New Westminster | Donald Chisholm (died 5 April 1890) | Conservative | 1887 | 1st term |
| New Westminster | Gordon Edward Corbould (by-election of 1890-06-19) | Conservative | 1890 | 1st term |
| Vancouver | David William Gordon | Liberal-Conservative | 1882 | 2nd term |
| Victoria* | Edgar Crow Baker (resigned 2 May 1889) | Conservative | 1882 | 2nd term |
| Victoria* | Noah Shakespeare (resigned June 1887 due to postmaster appointment) | Conservative | 1882 | 2nd term |
| Victoria* | Edward Gawler Prior (by-election of 1888-01-23, replaces Noah Shakespeare) | Conservative | 1888 | 1st term |
| Victoria* | Thomas Earle (by-election of 1889-10-28, replaces Edgar Baker) | Conservative | 1889 | 1st term |
| Yale | John Andrew Mara | Conservative | 1887 | 1st term |

=== Manitoba ===
| Electoral district | Name | Party | First elected/previously elected | No. of terms |
|---|---|---|---|---|
| Lisgar | Arthur Wellington Ross | Liberal-Conservative | 1882 | 2nd term |
| Marquette | Robert Watson | Liberal | 1882 | 2nd term |
| Provencher | Joseph Royal (until appointed North West Territories Lieutenant-Governor) | Conservative | 1879 | 3rd term |
| Provencher | Alphonse Alfred Clément Larivière (by-election of 1889-01-24) | Conservative | 1889 | 1st term |
| Selkirk | Thomas Mayne Daly | Liberal | 1887 | 1st term |
| Winnipeg | William Bain Scarth | Conservative | 1887 | 1st term |

=== New Brunswick ===
| Electoral district | Name | Party | First elected/previously elected | No. of terms |
|---|---|---|---|---|
| Albert | Richard Chapman Weldon | Conservative | 1887 | 1st term |
| Carleton | Frederick Harding Hale | Liberal-Conservative | 1887 | 1st term |
| Charlotte | Arthur Hill Gillmor | Liberal | 1874 | 4th term |
| City and County of St. John* | Charles Nelson Skinner | Liberal | 1887 | 1st term |
| City and County of St. John* | Charles Wesley Weldon | Liberal | 1878 | 3rd term |
| City of St. John | John Valentine Ellis | Liberal | 1887 | 1st term |
| Gloucester | Kennedy Francis Burns | Conservative | 1882 | 2nd term |
| Kent | Pierre Amand Landry | Conservative | 1883 | 2nd term |
| Kent | Édouard H. Léger (by-election of 1890-07-31) | Conservative | 1890 | 1st term |
| King's | **George Eulas Foster** | Conservative | 1882 | 2nd term |
| Northumberland | Peter Mitchell | Independent Liberal | 1872, 1882 | 4th term* |
| Queen's | George Frederick Baird (resigned 24 November 1887 due to contested election) | Conservative | 1878 | 3rd term |
| Queen's | George Frederick Baird (by-election of 1888-01-18) | Conservative | 1878 | 3rd term |
| Restigouche | Robert Moffat (died 25 April 1887) | Conservative | 1882 | 2nd term |
| Restigouche | George Moffat (by-election of 1887-05-21) | Conservative | 1887 | 1st term |
| Sunbury | Robert Duncan Wilmot | Conservative | 1867 | 6th term |
| Victoria | **John Costigan** | Liberal-Conservative | 1867 | 6th term |
| Westmorland | Josiah Wood | Conservative | 1882 | 2nd term |
| York | Thomas Temple | Conservative | 1884 | 2nd term |

=== Northwest Territories ===
| Electoral district | Name | Party | First elected/previously elected | No. of terms |
|---|---|---|---|---|
| Alberta (Provisional District) | Donald Watson Davis | Conservative | 1887 | 1st term |
| Assiniboia East | William Dell Perley (until appointed to Senate 3 August 1888) | Conservative | 1887 | 1st term |
| Assiniboia East | **Edgar Dewdney** (by-election of 1888-09-12) | Conservative | 1872, (Note: Yale (BC)) 1888 | 4th term* |
| Assiniboia West | Nicholas Flood Davin | Liberal-Conservative | 1887 | 1st term |
| Saskatchewan (Provisional District) | Day Hort MacDowall | Conservative | 1887 | 1st term |

=== Nova Scotia ===
| Electoral district | Name | Party | First elected/previously elected | No. of terms |
|---|---|---|---|---|
| Annapolis | John Burpee Mills | Conservative | 1887 | 1st term |
| Antigonish | **John Sparrow David Thompson** | Liberal-Conservative | 1885 | 2nd term |
| Cape Breton* | David Mackeen | Conservative | 1887 | 1st term |
| Cape Breton* | Hector Francis McDougall | Liberal-Conservative | 1884 | 2nd term |
| Colchester | **Archibald McLelan** (until unseated for bribery) | Conservative | 1867, 1881 | 4th term* |
| Colchester | **Archibald McLelan** (by-election of 1887-10-27, until appointed Nova Scotia Lieutenant-Governor) | Conservative | 1867, 1881 | 4th term* |
| Colchester | Adams George Archibald (by-election of 1888-08-15) | Liberal-Conservative | 1888 | 1st term |
| Cumberland | **Charles Tupper** (until election voided) | Conservative | 1867, 1887 | 6th term* |
| Cumberland | **Charles Tupper** (by-election of 1887-11-09, until 23 May 1888 appointment as UK High Commissioner for Canada) | Conservative | 1867, 1887 | 6th term* |
| Cumberland | Arthur Rupert Dickey (by-election of 1888-07-13, until election voided) | Conservative | 1888 | 1st term |
| Cumberland | Arthur Rupert Dickey (by-election of 1888-12-26) | Conservative | 1888 | 1st term |
| Digby | John Campbell (died 26 May 1887) | Conservative | 1887 | 1st term |
| Digby | Herbert Ladd Jones (by-election of 1887-07-16) | Conservative | 1887 | 1st term |
| Guysborough | John Angus Kirk | Liberal | 1874, 1882 | 3rd term* |
| Halifax* | Alfred Gilpin Jones | Liberal | 1867, 1874, 1887 | 3rd term* |
| Halifax* | Thomas Edward Kenny | Conservative | 1887 | 1st term |
| Hants | Alfred Putnam | Conservative | 1887 | 1st term |
| Inverness | Hugh Cameron | Conservative | 1867, 1882 | 3rd term* |
| Kings | Frederick William Borden | Liberal | 1874, 1887 | 3rd term* |
| Lunenburg | James Daniel Eisenhauer | Liberal | 1887 | 1st term |
| Pictou* | **Charles Hibbert Tupper** (until ministerial appointment) | Conservative | 1882 | 2nd term |
| Pictou* | John McDougald | Liberal-Conservative | 1881 | 3rd term |
| Pictou* | Charles Hibbert Tupper (by-election of 1888-06-18) | Conservative | 1882 | 2nd term |
| Queens | Joshua Newton Freeman | Liberal-Conservative | 1887 | 1st term |
| Richmond | Edmund Power Flynn | Liberal | 1874, 1887 | 3rd term* |
| Shelburne | Thomas Robertson (until election voided 9 November 1887) | Liberal | 1878 | 3rd term |
| Shelburne | John Wimburne Laurie (by-election of 1887-12-15, until election voided) | Conservative | 1887 | 1st term |
| Shelburne | John Wimburne Laurie (by-election of 1888-10-22) | Conservative | 1887 | 1st term |
| Victoria | John Archibald McDonald (until election voided) | Conservative | 1887 | 1st term |
| Victoria | John Archibald McDonald (by-election of 1887-11-21) | Liberal | 1887 | 1st term |
| Yarmouth | John Lovitt (until election voided 13 August 1887) | Liberal | 1887 | 1st term |
| Yarmouth | John Lovitt (by-election of 1887-12-15) | Liberal | 1887 | 1st term |

=== Ontario ===
| Electoral district | Name | Party | First elected/previously elected | No. of terms |
|---|---|---|---|---|
| Addington | John William Bell | Conservative | 1882 | 2nd term |
| Algoma | Simon James Dawson | Conservative | 1878 | 3rd term |
| Bothwell | David Mills | Liberal | 1884 | 2nd term |
| Brant North | James Somerville | Liberal | 1882 | 2nd term |
| Brant South | William Paterson | Liberal | 1872 | 5th term |
| Brockville | John Fisher Wood | Liberal-Conservative | 1882 | 2nd term |
| Bruce East | Henry Cargill (until resignation due to postmaster appointment) | Conservative | 1887 | 1st term |
| Bruce East | Henry Cargill (by-election of 1887-04-02) | Conservative | 1887 | 1st term |
| Bruce North | Alexander McNeill | Liberal-Conservative | 1882 | 2nd term |
| Bruce West | Edward Blake (until resignation to become member for Durham West) | Liberal | 1867, 1879 | 6th term* |
| Bruce West | James Rowand (by-election of 1887-10-19) | Liberal | 1887 | 1st term |
| Cardwell | **Thomas White** (died 21 April 1888) | Conservative | 1885 | 2nd term |
| Cardwell | Robert Smeaton White (by-election of 1888-10-03) | Conservative | 1888 | 1st term |
| Carleton | **John A. Macdonald** (until resignation to become member for Kingston) | Liberal-Conservative | 1867 | 6th term |
| Carleton | George Lemuel Dickinson (by-election of 1888-02-01) | Conservative | 1888 | 1st term |
| Cornwall and Stormont | Darby Bergin | Liberal-Conservative | 1872, 1878 | 4th term* |
| Dundas | Charles Erastus Hickey | Conservative | 1882 | 2nd term |
| Durham East | Henry Alfred Ward | Conservative | 1878 | 3rd term |
| Durham West | Edward Blake | Liberal | 1867, 1879 | 6th term* |
| Elgin East | John Henry Wilson | Liberal | 1882 | 2nd term |
| Elgin West | George Elliott Casey | Liberal | 1878 | 3rd term |
| Essex North | James Colebrooke Patterson | Conservative | 1872 | 5th term |
| Essex South | James Brien | Liberal | 1887 | 1st term |
| Frontenac | George Airey Kirkpatrick (†) | Conservative | 1870 | 6th term |
| Glengarry | Patrick Purcell | Liberal | 1887 | 1st term |
| Grenville South | Walter Shanly | Conservative | 1885 | 2nd term |
| Grey East | Thomas Simpson Sproule | Conservative | 1878 | 3rd term |
| Grey North | James Masson | Conservative | 1887 | 1st term |
| Grey South | George Landerkin | Liberal | 1872, 1882 | 4th term* |
| Haldimand | Walter Humphries Montague | Conservative | 1887 | 1st term |
| Haldimand | Walter Humphries Montague (by-election of 1887-11-12) | Conservative | 1887 | 1st term |
| Haldimand | Charles Wesley Colter (by-election of 1889-01-30) | Liberal | 1889 | 1st term |
| Haldimand | Walter Humphries Montague (by-election of 1890-02-20) | Conservative | 1887, 1890 | 2nd term* |
| Halton | John Waldie (until 19 January 1888 unseating for bribery) | Liberal | 1887 | 1st term |
| Halton | David Henderson (by-election of 1888-02-07, until unseated for corruption) | Conservative | 1888 | 1st term |
| Halton | John Waldie (by-election of 1888-08-22) | Liberal | 1887, 1888 | 2nd term* |
| Hamilton* | Adam Brown | Conservative | 1887 | 1st term |
| Hamilton* | Alexander McKay | Conservative | 1887 | 1st term |
| Hastings East | Samuel Barton Burdett | Liberal | 1887 | 1st term |
| Hastings North | **Mackenzie Bowell** | Conservative | 1867 | 6th term |
| Hastings West | Alexander Robertson (died 29 February 1888) | Conservative | 1882 | 2nd term |
| Hastings West | Henry Corby Jr. (by-election of 1888-03-17) | Conservative | 1888 | 1st term |
| Huron East | Peter Macdonald | Liberal | 1887 | 1st term |
| Huron South | John McMillan | Liberal | 1882, 1887 | 2nd term* |
| Huron West | Robert Porter | Liberal-Conservative | 1887 | 1st term |
| Kent | Archibald Campbell (until unseated 17 November 1887) | Liberal | 1887 | 1st term |
| Kent | Archibald Campbell (by-election of 1888-05-02) | Liberal | 1887 | 1st term |
| Kingston | **John A. Macdonald** | Liberal-Conservative | 1867 | 6th term |
| Lambton East | George Moncrieff | Conservative | 1887 | 1st term |
| Lambton West | James Frederick Lister | Liberal | 1882 | 2nd term |
| Lanark North | Joseph Jamieson | Conservative | 1882 | 2nd term |
| Lanark South | **John Graham Haggart** (until 3 August 1888 Postmaster General appointment) | Conservative | 1872 | 5th term |
| Lanark South | **John Graham Haggart** (by-election of 1888-08-15) | Conservative | 1872 | 5th term |
| Leeds North and Grenville North | Charles Frederick Ferguson | Liberal-Conservative | 1874 | 4th term |
| Leeds South | George Taylor | Conservative | 1882 | 2nd term |
| Lennox | Uriah Wilson | Conservative | 1887 | 1st term |
| Lincoln and Niagara | John Charles Rykert (resigned 2 May 1890) | Conservative | 1878 | 3rd term |
| Lincoln and Niagara | John Charles Rykert (by-election of 1890-05-23) | Conservative | 1878 | 3rd term |
| London | **John Carling** | Liberal-Conservative | 1867, 1878 | 5th term* |
| Middlesex East | Joseph Henry Marshall | Conservative | 1887 | 1st term |
| Middlesex North | Timothy Coughlin | Liberal-Conservative | 1878 | 3rd term |
| Middlesex South | James Armstrong | Liberal | 1882 | 2nd term |
| Middlesex West | William Frederick Roome (until unseated by petition) | Conservative | 1887 | 1st term |
| Middlesex West | William Frederick Roome (by-election of 1888-03-10) | Conservative | 1887 | 1st term |
| Monck | Arthur Boyle | Conservative | 1887 | 1st term |
| Muskoka and Parry Sound | William Edward O'Brien | Conservative | 1882 | 2nd term |
| Norfolk North | John Charlton | Liberal | 1872 | 5th term |
| Norfolk South | David Tisdale | Conservative | 1887 | 1st term |
| Northumberland East | Albert Elhanon Mallory (until unseated for bribery) | Liberal | 1887 | 1st term |
| Northumberland East | Edward Cochrane (by-election of 1887-12-22, until election voided) | Conservative | 1887 | 1st term |
| Northumberland East | Edward Cochrane (by-election of 1888-11-21) | Conservative | 1887 | 1st term |
| Northumberland West | George Guillet | Conservative | 1885 | 2nd term |
| Ontario North | Frank Madill | Conservative | 1887 | 1st term |
| Ontario South | William Smith | Conservative | 1887 | 1st term |
| Ontario West | James David Edgar | Liberal | 1884 | 2nd term |
| Ottawa (City of)* | William Goodhue Perley | Conservative | 1887 | 1st term |
| Ottawa (City of)* | Honoré Robillard | Liberal-Conservative | 1887 | 1st term |
| Ottawa (City of)* | Charles Herbert Mackintosh (by-election of 1890-04-26) | Conservative | 1882, 1890 | 2nd term* |
| Oxford North | James Sutherland | Liberal | 1880 | 3rd term |
| Oxford South | Richard John Cartwright | Liberal | 1867 | 6th term |
| Peel | William Armstrong McCulla | Conservative | 1887 | 1st term |
| Perth North | Samuel Rollin Hesson | Conservative | 1878 | 3rd term |
| Perth South | James Trow | Liberal | 1872 | 5th term |
| Peterborough East | John Lang | Independent Liberal | 1887 | 1st term |
| Peterborough West | James Stevenson | Conservative | 1887 | 1st term |
| Prescott | Simon Labrosse | Liberal | 1882 | 2nd term |
| Prince Edward | John Milton Platt (until election voided) | Liberal | 1882 | 2nd term |
| Prince Edward | John Milton Platt (by-election of 1888-03-10) | Liberal | 1882 | 2nd term |
| Renfrew North | Peter White | Conservative | 1876 | 4th term |
| Renfrew South | Robert Campbell (died in office) | Liberal | 1882 | 2nd term |
| Renfrew South | John Ferguson (by-election of 1887-08-02) | Independent Conservative | 1887 | 1st term |
| Russell | William Cameron Edwards (unseated for bribery) | Liberal | 1887 | 1st term |
| Russell | William Cameron Edwards (by-election of 1888-05-07) | Liberal | 1887 | 1st term |
| Simcoe East | Herman Henry Cook | Liberal | 1874, 1882 | 3rd term* |
| Simcoe North | Dalton McCarthy | Conservative | 1872 | 5th term |
| Simcoe South | Richard Tyrwhitt | Conservative | 1882 | 2nd term |
| Toronto Centre | George Ralph Richardson Cockburn | Conservative | 1887 | 1st term |
| Toronto East | John Small | Conservative | 1872 | 5th term |
| Victoria North | John Augustus Barron | Liberal | 1887 | 1st term |
| Victoria South | Adam Hudspeth (resigned) | Conservative | 1887 | 1st term |
| Victoria South | Adam Hudspeth (by-election of 1887-04-20, died in office) | Conservative | 1887 | 1st term |
| Victoria South | Charles Fairbairn (by-election of 1890-12-18) | Liberal-Conservative | 1890 | 1st term |
| Waterloo North | Isaac Erb Bowman | Liberal | 1867, 1887 | 4th term* |
| Waterloo South | James Livingston | Liberal | 1882 | 2nd term |
| Welland | John Ferguson | Conservative | 1878 | 3rd term |
| Wellington Centre | Andrew Semple | Liberal | 1887 | 1st term |
| Wellington North | James McMullen | Liberal | 1882 | 2nd term |
| Wellington South | James Innes | Liberal | 1882 | 2nd term |
| Wentworth North | Thomas Bain | Liberal | 1872 | 5th term |
| Wentworth South | Franklin Metcalfe Carpenter | Conservative | 1887 | 1st term |
| West Toronto | Frederick Charles Denison | Conservative | 1887 | 1st term |
| York East | Alexander Mackenzie | Liberal | 1867 | 6th term |
| York North | William Mulock | Liberal | 1882 | 2nd term |
| York West | Nathaniel Clarke Wallace | Conservative | 1878 | 3rd term |

=== Prince Edward Island ===
| Electoral district | Name | Party | First elected/previously elected | No. of terms |
|---|---|---|---|---|
| King's County* | James Edwin Robertson | Liberal | 1882 | 2nd term |
| King's County* | Peter Adolphus McIntyre | Liberal | 1874, 1882 | 3rd term* |
| Prince County* | Stanislaus Francis Perry | Liberal | 1874, 1887 | 2nd term* |
| Prince County* | James Yeo | Liberal | 1873 | 5th term |
| Queen's County* | Louis Henry Davies | Liberal | 1882 | 2nd term |
| Queen's County* | William Welsh | Independent Liberal | 1887 | 1st term |

=== Quebec ===
| Electoral district | Name | Party | First elected/previously elected | No. of terms |
|---|---|---|---|---|
| Argenteuil | James Crocket Wilson | Liberal-Conservative | 1887 | 1st term |
| Bagot | Flavien Dupont | Conservative | 1882 | 2nd term |
| Beauce | Joseph Godbout | Independent Liberal | 1887 | 1st term |
| Beauharnois | Joseph Gédéon Horace Bergeron | Independent Conservative | 1887 | 1st term |
| Bellechasse | Guillaume Amyot | Nationalist | 1881 | 3rd term |
| Berthier | Cléophas Beausoleil | Liberal | 1887 | 1st term |
| Bonaventure | Louis Joseph Riopel | Conservative | 1882 | 2nd term |
| Brome | Sydney Arthur Fisher | Liberal | 1882 | 2nd term |
| Chambly | Raymond Préfontaine | Liberal | 1886 | 2nd term |
| Champlain | Hippolyte Montplaisir | Liberal-Conservative | 1874 | 4th term |
| Charlevoix | Simon Xavier Cimon (died 26 June 1887) | Conservative | 1881 | 3rd term |
| Charlevoix | Simon Xavier Cimon, Jr. (by-election of 1887-09-28) | Conservative | 1887 | 1st term |
| Chicoutimi—Saguenay | Paul Couture | Independent | 1887 | 1st term |
| Châteauguay | Edward Holton | Liberal | 1880 | 3rd term |
| Compton | **John Henry Pope** (died 1 April 1889) | Liberal-Conservative | 1867 | 6th term |
| Compton | Rufus Henry Pope (by-election of 1889-05-16) | Conservative | 1889 | 1st term |
| Dorchester | Henri Jules Juchereau Duchesnay (died 6 July 1887) | Nationalist | 1887 | 1st term |
| Dorchester | Honoré Julien Jean-Baptiste Chouinard (by-election of 1888-01-07) | Conservative | 1888 | 1st term |
| Drummond—Arthabaska | Joseph Lavergne | Liberal | 1887 | 1st term |
| Gaspé | Louis Zéphirin Joncas | Conservative | 1887 | 1st term |
| Hochelaga | Alphonse Desjardins | Independent Conservative | 1874 | 4th term |
| Huntingdon | Julius Scriver | Liberal | 1869 | 6th term |
| Iberville | François Béchard | Liberal | 1867 | 6th term |
| Jacques Cartier | Désiré Girouard | Conservative | 1878 | 3rd term |
| Joliette | Édouard Guilbault (until election voided 6 November 1888) | Conservative | 1882 | 2nd term |
| Joliette | Hilaire Neveu (by-election of 1889-01-16) | Nationalist | 1889 | 1st term |
| Kamouraska | Alexis Dessaint | Liberal | 1887 | 1st term |
| Laprairie | Cyrille Doyon | Independent Liberal | 1887 | 1st term |
| L'Assomption | Joseph Gauthier (unseated 3 March 1888) | Liberal | 1887 | 1st term |
| L'Assomption | Joseph Gauthier (by-election of 1888-04-03) | Liberal | 1887 | 1st term |
| Laval | Joseph-Aldric Ouimet (†) | Liberal-Conservative | 1873 | 5th term |
| Lévis | Pierre Malcom Guay | Liberal | 1885 | 2nd term |
| L'Islet | Philippe Baby Casgrain | Liberal | 1872 | 5th term |
| Lotbinière | Côme Isaïe Rinfret | Liberal | 1878 | 3rd term |
| Maskinongé | Charles Jérémie Coulombe | Conservative | 1887 | 1st term |
| Mégantic | Georges Turcot | Liberal | 1887 | 1st term |
| Missisquoi | George Clayes (died 3 March 1888) | Liberal | 1887 | 1st term |
| Missisquoi | Daniel Bishop Meigs (by-election of 1888-03-27) | Liberal | 1888 | 1st term |
| Montcalm | Olaüs Thérien | Conservative | 1887 | 1st term |
| Montmagny | Philippe-Auguste Choquette | Liberal | 1887 | 1st term |
| Montmorency | Charles Langelier (resigned 10 June 1890) | Liberal | 1887 | 1st term |
| Montmorency | Louis-Georges Desjardins (by-election of 1890-07-25) | Conservative | 1890 | 1st term |
| Montreal Centre | John Joseph Curran | Conservative | 1882 | 2nd term |
| Montreal East | Charles-Joseph Coursol (died 4 August 1888) | Conservative | 1878 | 3rd term |
| Montreal East | Alphonse Télesphore Lépine (by-election of 1888-09-26) | Independent Conservative | 1888 | 1st term |
| Montreal West | Donald Alexander Smith | Independent Conservative | 1871, (Note: Selkirk (Manitoba)) 1887 | 5th term* |
| Napierville | Louis Ste-Marie | Liberal | 1887 | 1st term |
| Napierville | François-Xavier Paradis (by-election of 1890-12-09) | Conservative | 1890 | 1st term |
| Nicolet | Athanase Gaudet (died 29 April 1888) | Nationalist Conservative | 1884 | 2nd term |
| Nicolet | Fabien Boisvert (by-election of 1888-07-17) | Independent Conservative | 1888 | 1st term |
| Ottawa (County of) | Alonzo Wright | Liberal-Conservative | 1867 | 6th term |
| Pontiac | John Bryson | Conservative | 1882 | 2nd term |
| Portneuf | Joseph Esdras Alfred de Saint-Georges | Liberal | 1872, 1882 | 4th term* |
| Quebec-Centre | François Charles Stanislas Langelier | Liberal | 1882 | 2nd term |
| Quebec County | **Adolphe-Philippe Caron** | Conservative | 1873 | 5th term |
| Quebec East | Wilfrid Laurier | Liberal | 1874 | 4th term |
| Quebec West | Thomas McGreevy | Liberal-Conservative | 1867 | 6th term |
| Richelieu | Jean-Baptiste Labelle (died 3 August 1887) | Conservative | 1887 | 1st term |
| Richelieu | Joseph-Aimé Massue (by-election of 1887-10-18) | Conservative | 1887 | 1st term |
| Richmond—Wolfe | William Bullock Ives | Conservative | 1878 | 3rd term |
| Rimouski | Jean-Baptiste Romuald Fiset | Liberal | 1887 | 1st term |
| Rouville | Georges Auguste Gigault | Conservative | 1878 | 3rd term |
| St. Hyacinthe | Michel Esdras Bernier | Liberal | 1882 | 2nd term |
| St. John's | François Bourassa | Liberal | 1867 | 6th term |
| Saint Maurice | François Sévère Lesieur Desaulniers | Conservative | 1887 | 1st term |
| Shefford | Antoine Audet | Conservative | 1887 | 1st term |
| Town of Sherbrooke | Robert Newton Hall | Liberal-Conservative | 1882 | 2nd term |
| Soulanges | James William Bain | Conservative | 1882 | 2nd term |
| Stanstead | **Charles Carroll Colby** (until 28 November 1889 appointment as President of Privy Council) | Liberal-Conservative | 1867 | 6th term |
| Stanstead | **Charles Carroll Colby** (by-election of 1889-12-18) | Liberal-Conservative | 1867 | 6th term |
| Témiscouata | Paul Étienne Grandbois | Conservative | 1878 | 3rd term |
| Terrebonne | **Joseph-Adolphe Chapleau** | Conservative | 1882 | 2nd term |
| Three Rivers | **Hector-Louis Langevin** | Conservative | 1867, (Note: Dorchester) 1876, (Note: Charlevoix) 1878 | 6th term* |
| Two Mountains | Jean-Baptiste Daoust | Conservative | 1876 | 4th term |
| Vaudreuil | Hugh McMillan | Conservative | 1882 | 2nd term |
| Verchères | Félix Geoffrion | Liberal | 1867 | 6th term |
| Yamaska | Fabien Vanasse | Conservative | 1879 | 3rd term |

== By-elections ==
| By-election | Date | Incumbent | Party | Winner | Party | Cause | Retained |
|---|---|---|---|---|---|---|---|
| Victoria South | December 18, 1890 | Adam Hudspeth | Conservative | Charles Fairbairn | Liberal-Conservative | Death | Yes |
| Napierville | December 9, 1890 | Louis Sainte-Marie | Liberal | François-Xavier Paradis | Conservative | Resigned to enter provincial politics in Quebec. | No |
| Kent | July 31, 1890 | Pierre-Amand Landry | Conservative | Édouard H. Léger | Conservative | Appointed a judge in the county court of Westmorland and Kent. | Yes |
| Montmorency | July 25, 1890 | Charles Langelier | Liberal | Louis-Georges Desjardins | Conservative | Resignation to enter provincial politics in Quebec. | No |
| New Westminster | June 19, 1890 | Donald Chisholm | Conservative | Gordon Edward Corbould | Conservative | Death | Yes |
| Lincoln and Niagara | May 23, 1890 | John Charles Rykert | Conservative | John Charles Rykert | Conservative | Resignation to recontest over charges of corruption. | Yes |
| Ottawa (City of) (electoral district) | April 26, 1890 | William Goodhue Perley | Conservative | Charles Herbert Mackintosh | Conservative | Death | Yes |
| Haldimand | February 20, 1890 | Charles Wesley Colter | Liberal | Walter Humphries Montague | Conservative | Election declared void. | No |
| Stanstead | December 18, 1889 | Charles Carroll Colby | Liberal-Conservative | Charles Carroll Colby | Liberal-Conservative | Recontested upon appointment as President of the Privy Council. | Yes |
| Victoria | October 28, 1889 | Edgar Crow Baker | Conservative | Thomas Earle | Conservative | Resignation. | Yes |
| Compton | May 16, 1889 | John Henry Pope | Liberal-Conservative | Rufus Henry Pope | Conservative | Death | Yes |
| Haldimand | January 30, 1889 | Walter Humphries Montague | Conservative | Charles Wesley Colter | Liberal | Election declared void. | No |
| Provencher | January 24, 1889 | Joseph Royal | Conservative | Alphonse Alfred Clément Larivière | Conservative | Appointed Lieutenant-Governor of the North West Territories. | Yes |
| Joliette | January 16, 1889 | Édouard Guilbault | Conservative | Hilaire Neveu | Nationalist | Election declared void. | No |
| Cumberland | December 26, 1888 | Arthur Rupert Dickey | Conservative | Arthur Rupert Dickey | Conservative | Election declared void. | Yes |
| Cariboo | November 22, 1888 | James Reid | Liberal-Conservative | Francis Stillman Barnard | Conservative | Called to the Senate. | Yes |
| Northumberland East | November 21, 1888 | Edward Cochrane | Conservative | Edward Cochrane | Conservative | Election declared void. | Yes |
| Shelburne | October 22, 1888 | John Wimburne Laurie | Conservative | John Wimburne Laurie | Conservative | Election declared void. | Yes |
| Cardwell | October 3, 1888 | Thomas White | Conservative | Robert Smeaton White | Conservative | Death | Yes |
| Montreal East | September 26, 1888 | Charles-Joseph Coursol | Conservative | Alphonse-Télesphore Lépine | Independent Conservative | Death | No |
| Assiniboia East | September 12, 1888 | William Dell Perley | Conservative | Edgar Dewdney | Conservative | Called to the Senate | Yes |
| Halton | August 22, 1888 | John Waldie | Conservative | David Henderson | Conservative | Election declared void. | No |
| Lanark South | August 15, 1888 | John Graham Haggart | Liberal | John Graham Haggart | Conservative | Recontested upon appointment as Postmaster-General. | Yes |
| Colchester | August 15, 1888 | Archibald McLelan | Conservative | Adams George Archibald | Liberal-Conservative | Appointed Lieutenant-Governor of Nova Scotia. | Yes |
| Nicolet | July 17, 1888 | Athanase Gaudet | Nationalist Conservative | Fabien Boisvert | Independent Conservative | Death | No |
| Cumberland | July 13, 1888 | Charles Tupper | Conservative | Arthur Rupert Dickey | Conservative | Appointed Canadian High Commissioner to the United Kingdom. | Yes |
| Pictou | June 18, 1888 | Charles Hibbert Tupper | Conservative | Charles Hibbert Tupper | Conservative | Recontested upon appointment as Minister of Marine and Fisheries. | Yes |
| Russell | May 7, 1888 | William C. Edwards | Liberal | William C. Edwards | Liberal | Election declared void. | Yes |
| Kent | May 2, 1888 | Archibald Campbell | Liberal | Archibald Campbell | Liberal | Election declared void. | Yes |
| L'Assomption | April 3, 1888 | Joseph Gauthier | Liberal | Joseph Gauthier | Liberal | Election declared void. | Yes |
| Missisquoi | March 27, 1888 | George Clayes | Liberal | Daniel Bishop Meigs | Liberal | Death | Yes |
| Prince Edward | March 19, 1888 | John Milton Platt | Liberal | John Milton Platt | Liberal | Election declared void. | Yes |
| Hastings West | March 17, 1888 | Alexander Robertson | Conservative | Henry Corby, Jr. | Conservative | Death | Yes |
| Middlesex West | March 10, 1888 | William Frederick Roome | Conservative | William Frederick Roome | Conservative | Election declared void. | Yes |
| Halton | February 7, 1888 | John Waldie | Liberal | David Henderson | Conservative | Election declared void. | No |
| Carleton | February 1, 1888 | John A. Macdonald | Liberal-Conservative | George Lemuel Dickinson | Conservative | Chose to sit for Kingston. | Yes |
| Victoria | January 23, 1888 | Noah Shakespeare | Conservative | Edward Gawler Prior | Conservative | Appointed Postmaster of Victoria. | Yes |
| Queen's | January 18, 1888 | George Gerald King | Liberal | George Frederick Baird | Conservative | Election declared void. | No |
| Dorchester | January 7, 1888 | Henri Jules Juchereau Duchesnay | Nationalist Conservative | Honoré-Julien-Jean-Baptiste Chouinard | Conservative | Death | No |
| Northumberland East | December 22, 1887 | Albert Mallory | Liberal | Edward Cochrane | Conservative | Election declared void. | No |
| Shelburne | December 15, 1887 | Thomas Robertson | Liberal | John Wimburne Laurie | Conservative | Election declared void. | No |
| Yarmouth | December 15, 1887 | John Lovitt | Liberal | John Lovitt | Liberal | Election declared void. | Yes |
| Victoria | November 21, 1887 | Charles James Campbell | Conservative | John Archibald McDonald | Liberal | Election declared void. | No |
| Haldimand | November 12, 1887 | Walter Humphries Montague | Conservative | Walter Humphries Montague | Conservative | Election declared void. | Yes |
| Cumberland | November 9, 1887 | Charles Tupper | Conservative | Charles Tupper | Conservative | Election declared void. | Yes |
| Colchester | October 27, 1887 | Archibald McLelan | Conservative | Archibald McLelan | Conservative | Election declared void. | Yes |
| Bruce West | October 19, 1887 | Edward Blake | Liberal | James Rowand | Liberal | Chose to sit for Durham West. | Yes |
| Richelieu | October 18, 1887 | Jean-Baptiste Labelle | Conservative | Joseph-Aimé Massue | Conservative | Death | Yes |
| Charlevoix | September 28, 1887 | Simon-Xavier Cimon | Conservative | Simon Cimon | Conservative | Death | Yes |
| Renfrew South | August 2, 1887 | Robert Campbell | Liberal | John Ferguson | Independent | Death | No |
| Digby | July 16, 1887 | John Campbell | Conservative | Herbert Ladd Jones | Conservative | Death | Yes |
| Restigouche | May 21, 1887 | Robert Moffat | Conservative | George Moffat Jr. | Conservative | Death | Yes |
| Victoria South | April 20, 1887 | Adam Hudspeth | Conservative | Adam Hudspeth | Liberal-Conservative | Seeks re-election due to holding the office of revising officer. | Yes |
| Bruce East | April 2, 1887 | Henry Cargill | Conservative | Henry Cargill | Conservative | Seeks re-election due to holding the position of postmaster. | Yes |
