= 3rd Canadian Ministry =

Government cabinet of Canada (1878–1891)

3rd Canadian Ministry 3e conseil des ministres du Canada
- 3rd ministry of Canada

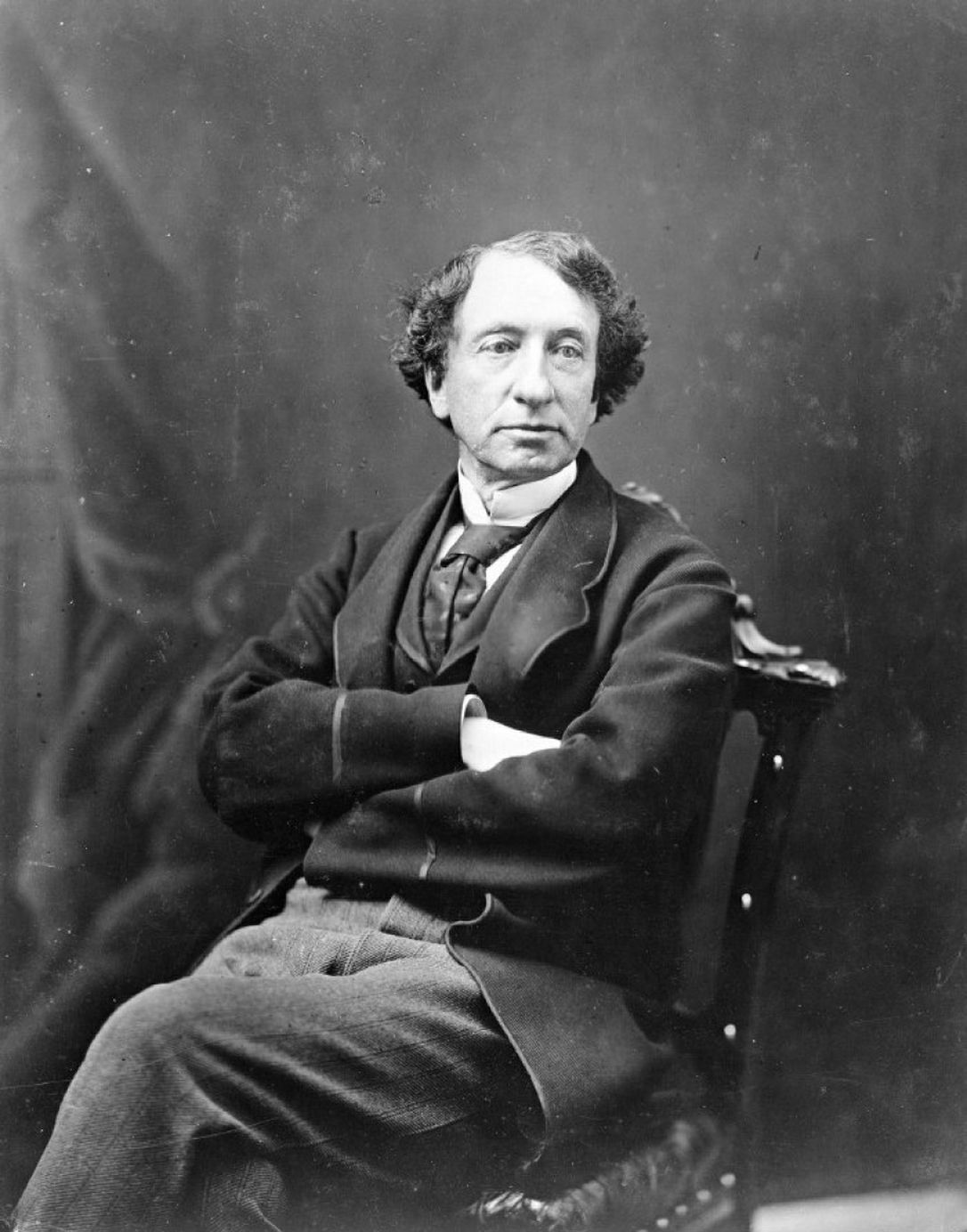
- Date formed: 17 October 1878
- Date dissolved: 6 June 1891

People and organizations
- Monarch: Victoria
- Governor General: Marquess of Dufferin; Duke of Argyll; Marquess of Lansdowne; Earl of Derby
- Prime Minister: John A. Macdonald
- Member party: Conservative
- Status in legislature: Majority
- Opposition party: Liberal
- Opposition leader: Alexander Mackenzie (1878–1880); Edward Blake (1880–1887); Wilfrid Laurier (1887–1896)

History
- Incoming formation: 1878 Canadian federal election
- Outgoing formation: Death of John A. MacDonald
- Elections: 1878, 1882, 1887, 1891
- Legislature terms: 4th Canadian Parliament; 5th Canadian Parliament; 6th Canadian Parliament; 7th Canadian Parliament
- Predecessor: 2nd Canadian Ministry
- Successor: 4th Canadian Ministry

The Third Canadian Ministry was the second cabinet chaired by Prime Minister John A. Macdonald. It governed Canada from 17 October 1878 to 6 June 1891, including the 4th, 5th, and 6th Canadian Parliaments, as well as the first three months of the 7th. The government was formed by the old Conservative Party of Canada. Macdonald was also Prime Minister in the First Canadian Ministry.

== Ministries ==
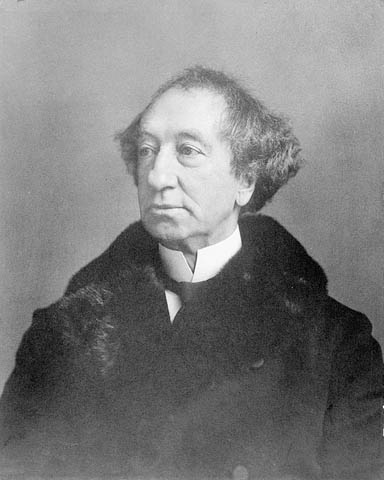
PM John A. Macdonald in November 1883.

- Prime Minister
  - 17 October 1878 – 6 June 1891: John A. Macdonald
- Minister of Agriculture
  - 17 October 1878 – 25 September 1885: John Henry Pope
  - 25 September 1885 – 6 June 1891: John Carling
- Minister of Customs
  - 17 October 1878 – 19 October 1878: Vacant (James Johnson was acting)
  - 19 October 1878 – 6 June 1891: Mackenzie Bowell
- Minister of Finance
  - 17 October 1878 – 11 November 1885: Samuel Leonard Tilley
  - 11 November 1885 – 10 December 1885: Vacant (John Mortimer Courtney was acting)
  - 10 December 1885 – 27 January 1887: Archibald McLelan
  - 27 January 1887 – 29 May 1888: Charles Tupper
  - 29 May 1888 – 6 June 1891: George Eulas Foster
- Superintendent-General of Indian Affairs
  - 17 October 1878 – 17 October 1883: The Minister of the Interior (Ex Officio)
    - 17 October 1878 – 17 October 1883: John A. Macdonald
  - 17 October 1883 – 3 October 1887: The President of the Privy Council (Ex officio)
    - 17 October 1883 – 3 October 1887: John A. Macdonald
  - 3 October 1887 – 6 June 1891: The Minister of the Interior (Ex Officio)
    - 3 October 1887 – 22 April 1888: Thomas White
    - 22 April 1888 – 8 May 1888: Vacant (Alexander Mackinnon Burgess was acting)
    - 8 May 1888 – 25 September 1888: John A. Macdonald (Acting)
    - 25 September 1888 – 6 June 1891: Edgar Dewdney
- Minister of Inland Revenue
  - 17 October 1878 – 26 October 1878: Vacant (Alfred Brunel was acting)
  - 26 October 1878 – 8 November 1880: Louis François Georges Baby
  - 8 November 1880 – 23 May 1882: James Cox Aikins
  - 23 May 1882 – 6 June 1891: John Costigan
- Minister of the Interior
  - 17 October 1878 – 17 October 1883: John A. Macdonald
  - 17 October 1883 – 4 August 1885: David Lewis Macpherson
  - 5 August 1885 – 21 April 1888: Thomas White
  - 22 April 1888 – 7 May 1888: Vacant (Alexander Mackinnon Burgess was acting)
  - 8 May 1888 – 24 September 1888: John A. Macdonald (acting)
  - 25 September 1888 – 6 June 1891: Edgar Dewdney
- Minister of Justice
  - 17 October 1878 – 20 May 1881: James McDonald
  - 20 May 1881 – 26 September 1885: Alexander Campbell
  - 26 September 1885 – 6 June 1891: John Sparrow David Thompson
- Attorney General of Canada
  - 17 October 1878 – 6 June 1891: The Minister of Justice (Ex officio)
    - 17 October 1878 – 20 May 1881: James McDonald
    - 20 May 1881 – 26 September 1885: Alexander Campbell
    - 26 September 1885 – 6 June 1891: John Sparrow David Thompson
- Leader of the Government in the Senate
  - 17 October 1878 – 7 February 1887: Alexander Campbell
  - 7 February 1887 – 12 May 1887: Frank Smith (acting)
  - 12 May 1887 – 6 June 1891: John Abbott
- Minister of Marine and Fisheries
  - 17 October 1878 – 19 October 1878: Vacant (William Smith was acting)
  - 19 October 1878 – 10 July 1882: James Colledge Pope
  - 10 July 1882 – 10 December 1885: Archibald McLelan
  - 10 December 1885 – 1 June 1888: George Eulas Foster
  - 1 June 1888 – 6 June 1891: Charles Hibbert Tupper
- Minister of Militia and Defence
  - 17 October 1878 – 19 October 1878: Vacant (Charles-Eugène Panet was acting)
  - 19 October 1878 – 16 January 1880: Louis François Rodrigue Masson
  - 16 January 1880 – 8 November 1880: Alexander Campbell
  - 8 November 1880 – 6 June 1891: Joseph Philippe René Adolphe Caron
- Postmaster General
  - 17 October 1878 – 19 October 1878: Vacant (William Henry Griffin was acting)
  - 19 October 1878 – 20 May 1879: Hector Louis Langevin
  - 20 May 1879 – 16 January 1880: Alexander Campbell
  - 16 January 1880 – 8 November 1880: John O'Connor
  - 8 November 1880 – 20 May 1881: Alexander Campbell
  - 20 May 1881 – 23 May 1882: John O'Connor
  - 23 May 1882 – 25 September 1885: John Carling
  - 25 September 1885 – 27 January 1887: Alexander Campbell
  - 27 January 1887 – 11 July 1888: Archibald McLelan
  - 11 July 1888 – 6 August 1888: John Carling (Acting)
  - 6 August 1888 – 6 June 1891: John Graham Haggart
- President of the Privy Council
  - 17 October 1878 – 16 January 1880: John O'Connor
  - 16 January 1880 – 1 August 1880: Louis François Rodrigue Masson
  - 1 August 1880 – 8 November 1880: John A. Macdonald (acting)
  - 8 November 1880 – 20 May 1881: Joseph-Alfred Mousseau
  - 20 May 1881 – 10 July 1882: Archibald McLelan
  - 10 July 1882 – 17 October 1883: John A. Macdonald (acting)
  - 17 October 1883 – 28 November 1889: John A. Macdonald
  - 28 November 1889 – 1 May 1891: Charles Carroll Colby
  - 1 May 1891 – 6 June 1891: John A. Macdonald (acting)
- Minister of Public Works
  - 17 October 1878 – 20 May 1879: Charles Tupper
  - 20 May 1879 – 6 June 1891: Hector Louis Langevin
- Minister of Railways and Canals
  - 20 May 1879 – 29 May 1884: Charles Tupper
  - 29 May 1884 – 25 September 1885: John Henry Pope (Acting)
  - 25 September 1885 – 1 April 1889: John Henry Pope
  - 1 April 1889 – 10 April 1889: Vacant (Toussaint Trudeau was acting)
  - 10 April 1889 – 28 November 1889: John A. Macdonald (acting)
  - 28 November 1889 – 6 June 1891: John A. Macdonald
- Receiver General of Canada
  - 17 October 1878 – 8 November 1878: Vacant (John Mortimer Courtney was acting)
  - 8 November 1878 – 20 May 1879: Alexander Campbell
  - 20 May 1879 – 6 June 1891: The Minister of Finance (Ex officio)
    - 20 May 1879 – 11 November 1885: Samuel Leonard Tilley
    - 11 November 1885 – 10 December 1885: Vacant (John Mortimer Courtney (acting)
    - 10 December 1885 – 27 January 1887: Archibald McLelan
    - 27 January 1887 – 29 May 1888: Charles Tupper
    - 29 May 1888 – 6 June 1891: George Eulas Foster
- Secretary of State of Canada
  - 17 October 1878 – 19 October 1878: Vacant (Edouard-Joseph Langevin (acting)
  - 19 October 1878 – 8 November 1880: James Cox Aikins
  - 8 November 1880 – 20 May 1881: John O'Connor
  - 20 May 1881 – 29 July 1882: Joseph-Alfred Mousseau
  - 29 July 1882 – 6 June 1891: Joseph-Adolphe Chapleau
- Registrar General of Canada
  - 17 October 1878 – 6 June 1891: The Secretary of State of Canada (Ex officio)
    - 17 October 1878 – 19 October 1878: Vacant (Edouard-Joseph Langevin was acting)
    - 19 October 1878 – 8 November 1880: James Cox Aikins
    - 8 November 1880 – 20 May 1881: John O'Connor
    - 20 May 1881 – 29 July 1882: Joseph-Alfred Mousseau
    - 29 July 1882 – 6 June 1891: Joseph-Adolphe Chapleau
- Minister without Portfolio
  - 8 November 1878 – 11 February 1880: Robert Duncan Wilmot
  - 11 February 1880 – 17 October 1883: David Lewis Macpherson
  - 2 August 1882 – 6 June 1891: Frank Smith
  - 13 May 1887 – 6 June 1891: John Abbott

== Succession ==
Ministries of Canada
Preceded by 2nd Canadian Ministry	3rd Canadian Ministry; 1878–1891	Succeeded by 4th Canadian Ministry
