= Charles Lapointe =

Canadian politician (born 1944)

The Honourable Charles Lapointe PC
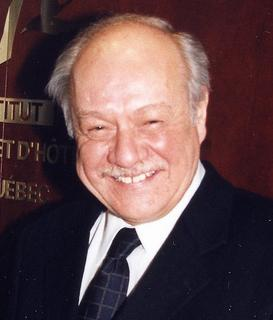

Member of the Canadian Parliament for Charlevoix
- In office 1974–1984
- Preceded by: Gilles Caouette
- Succeeded by: Charles-André Hamelin

Personal details
- Born: July 17, 1944 (age 81) Tadoussac, Quebec
- Party: Liberal

Charles Lapointe PC (born July 17, 1944) is a Canadian businessman and former politician and public servant.

Lapointe was first elected to the House of Commons of Canada in the 1974 federal election as a Liberal Member of Parliament for Charlevoix. He served as Canadian delegate to the United Nations General Assembly in 1976, and parliamentary secretary to the Transport minister from 1977 to 1979.

He was re-elected in the 1979 federal election that defeated the Liberal government. When the Liberals returned to power in the 1980 election, Lapointe was appointed by Prime Minister Trudeau to the cabinet as Minister of State for Small Businesses and Tourism.

In 1982, he became Minister of State for External Relations and, in 1983, he was promoted to Minister of Supply and Services and Receiver-General.

When John Turner succeeded Trudeau as Liberal leader and prime minister in June 1984, he retained Lapointe as Minister of Supply and Services while giving him the additional portfolio of Minister of Public Works. The added responsibility was short-lived, however, as both the Liberal government and Lapointe were defeated in the subsequent fall federal election.

Returning to private life, Lapointe became president of the International Aeroplane Company, and then vice-president of business development for Lavalin. In 1989, he became president and chief executive officer of the Greater Montreal Convention and Tourism Bureau (Tourisme Montréal), retaining the position until his retirement in 2013. In 2002, he also became chairman of the Canadian Tourism Commission.

In January 2007, as head of Tourism Montreal, he said the city was filthy and more should be done to make it tidy for visitors, leading Mayor Gérald Tremblay to ask for his resignation. Supported by many, Lapointe did not resign and continued in his position.

Lapointe was openly gay among his caucus colleagues, but never publicly spoke about his sexuality to the media during his time in Parliament. With Tourisme Montréal, however, beginning in 1994 he created a then-innovative campaign to increase the city's visibility as a gay tourism destination, building civic partnerships with LGBT community events such as Divers/Cité and the Black and Blue Festival, and culminating in the city's hosting of the World Outgames in 2006. In 2013, he received the Hanns Ebensten Hall of Fame Award from the International Gay and Lesbian Travel Association.
