= Martial Asselin =

Canadian politician

The Right Honourable Martial Asselin PC OC QC

25th Lieutenant Governor of Quebec
- In office August 9, 1990 – August 8, 1996
- Monarch: Elizabeth II
- Governors General: Ray Hnatyshyn; Roméo LeBlanc
- Premier: Robert Bourassa; Daniel Johnson Jr. Jacques Parizeau; Lucien Bouchard
- Preceded by: Gilles Lamontagne
- Succeeded by: Jean-Louis Roux

Member of the Canadian Parliament for Charlevoix
- In office March 31, 1958 – June 18, 1962
- Preceded by: Auguste Maltais
- Succeeded by: Louis-Philippe-Antoine Bélanger
- In office November 8, 1965 – October 30, 1972
- Preceded by: Louis-Philippe-Antoine Bélanger
- Succeeded by: Gilles Caouette

Senator for Stadacona, Quebec
- In office September 1, 1972 – August 9, 1990
- Appointed by: Pierre Trudeau
- Preceded by: Jean-Marie Dessureault
- Succeeded by: Claude Castonguay

Personal details
- Born: February 3, 1924 La Malbaie, Quebec, Canada
- Died: January 25, 2013 (aged 88) Quebec City, Quebec, Canada
- Party: Progressive Conservative
- Spouse(s): Pierrette Bouchard (m. 1950; died 1969) Ginette D'Auteuil (m. 1976)

Joseph Ferdinand Martial Asselin PC OC QC (February 3, 1924 – January 25, 2013) was a Canadian politician and the 25th Lieutenant Governor of Quebec (1990–1996).

== Life and career ==
Born in La Malbaie, Quebec, the son of Ferdinand Asselin and Eugénie Tremblay, he was called to the Bar of Quebec in 1951. He became a Queen's Counsel in 1967. From 1957 to 1963, he was the mayor of La Malbaie.

Asselin was first elected to the House of Commons of Canada in the 1958 election as a Progressive Conservative Member of Parliament in the Diefenbaker sweep. He represented the riding of Charlevoix.

Asselin was defeated in the 1962 election. Despite no longer having a seat, Diefenbaker appointed Asselin to the position of Minister of Forestry in 1963, in the hope that he and the Tories would both win the upcoming 1963 election. He served for only a month until the defeat of the Conservatives and Asselin's failure to regain his seat.

He returned to the House of Commons in the 1965 election, and he was re-elected in the 1968 election.

Prior to the 1972 election, he accepted an appointment to the Senate of Canada. He sat in the Senate until 1990, when he was appointed as lieutenant governor by the Governor General, on the advice of Prime Minister Brian Mulroney. Asselin was in office during the 1995 Quebec Referendum for sovereignty. In 1996, he was made an officer of the Order of Canada.

In 1992, he was given the right to use the honorific style of "The Right Honourable", which is granted for life and to very few eminent Canadians.{{[cn}} On January 25, 2013, Asselin died at the Hôpital de l'Enfant-Jésus de Québec in Quebec City. He was 88 years old.

== Coat of arms ==
Coat of arms of Martial Asselin
Notes The arms of Martial Asselin consist of: Crest Above a helmet mantled Azure doubled Argent on a wreath of these colours an eagle wings addorsed and inverted Azure beaked and membered Or armed and langued Azure wearing a coronet alternately érablé and fleurdelisé Argent holding in its dexter talons scales of justice Argent. Escutcheon Azure a chevron Argent cotised Or between in chief two mullets and in base a fleur-de-lys Or. Supporters Two stallions Argent crined and queued Or langued and unguled Azure gorged with a coronet fleurdelisé Azure charged on its rim with mullets Or. Compartment A grassy mound strewn with daisies proper. Motto Liberté Et Justice

Political offices
Preceded by Hugh John Fleming	Minister of Forestry; 1963	Succeeded by John Robert Nicholson
Preceded by Gildas Molgat	Speaker Pro Tempore of the Senate of Canada; 1984–1988	Succeeded by Gildas Molgat
