= Louis-Philippe-Antoine Bélanger =

Canadian politician (1907–1989)

Member of the Canadian Parliament for Charlevoix
- In office 1962–1965
- Preceded by: Martial Asselin
- Succeeded by: Martial Asselin

Personal details
- Born: April 17, 1907 Saint-Damase-de-L'Islet, Quebec, Canada
- Died: June 14, 1989 (aged 82)
- Party: Social Credit Party of Canada (1945-1963); Ralliement Créditiste (1963-)
- Relatives: Joël Godin (grandson)
- Occupation: Clerk forester land surveyor machinist

Louis-Philippe-Antoine Bélanger (April 17, 1907 – June 14, 1989) was a Canadian politician. He first ran for the House of Commons of Canada in 1945 in the district of Charlevoix—Saguenay under the banner of the Social Credit Party of Canada, but was defeated. Much later, in the 1962 election, he ran again in the district of Charlevoix and was elected. He was re-elected in 1963 and left Parliament before the 1965 election. Prior to his federal political experience, he was elected mayor of Beaupré, Quebec in 1945 and served until 1964. While mayor he led the effort to build the famous ski resort Mont-Sainte-Anne, which opened in 1966.
