= Charles-André Hamelin =

Canadian politician

Member of the Canadian Parliament for Charlevoix
- In office 1984–1988
- Preceded by: Charles Lapointe
- Succeeded by: Brian Mulroney

Personal details
- Born: 20 April 1947
- Died: 29 July 1993 (aged 46)
- Party: Progressive Conservative

Charles-André Hamelin (20 April 1947 – 29 July 1993) was a Progressive Conservative party member of the House of Commons of Canada. He was a businessman and journalist by career.

He won election in the riding of Charlevoix in the 1984 federal election, and thus served in the 33rd Canadian Parliament.

In the 1988 federal election, Hamelin campaigned at the Laurier—Sainte-Marie riding but was defeated by Jean-Claude Malépart of the Liberal party. Prime Minister Brian Mulroney contested and won Charlevoix in 1988 in place of Hamelin.
