= Rodolphe Forget =

French-Canadian businessman and politician (1861-1919)

Colonel Sir Rodolphe Forget
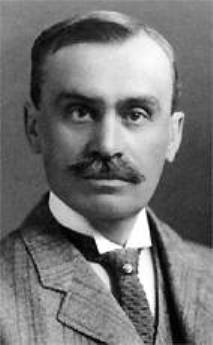

Member of the Canadian Parliament for Charlevoix
- In office 1904–1917
- Preceded by: Louis Charles Alphonse Angers
- Succeeded by: District was abolished in 1914

Member of the Canadian Parliament for Montmorency (Note: Elected for Charlevoix and for Montmorency. Sat for both ridings.)
- In office 1911–1917
- Preceded by: Georges Parent
- Succeeded by: District was abolished in 1914

Personal details
- Born: December 10, 1861 Terrebonne, Canada East
- Died: February 19, 1919 (aged 57) Montreal, Quebec
- Party: Conservative
- Relations: Pierre-François Casgrain (son-in-law)
- Children: Thérèse Casgrain (daughter)

Colonel Sir Joseph David Rodolphe Forget (December 10, 1861 – February 19, 1919) was a Canadian business investor, stockbroker, and politician. He held national directorships and had major investments in energy companies, as well as industrial concerns and railway companies in the Provinces of Quebec and Ontario. He was one of the few French Canadian business magnates of his time.

== Life and career ==
Born in Terrebonne in what was then known as Canada East, he was the only son of David Rodolphe Forget, a lawyer at Terrebonne who was the brother of the Hon. Louis-Joseph Forget. His mother, Angele Limoges, was the half-sister of Sir Louis-Olivier Taillon, 8th Prime Minister of Quebec. The Forgets were long settled in Quebec, having moved there from Normandy in 1650.

Forget became one of the most influential and controversial businessmen of his era in Quebec. With wide-ranging business interests, one of his companies built the Manoir Richelieu hotel in 1899 at La Malbaie, Quebec.

During the early 1900s, Rodolphe Forget with his uncle Louis-Joseph Forget and Forget family investments controlled the very important Montreal Light, Heat & Power Company. Rodolphe Forget also served as chairman of the Board of Directors of the Montreal Stock Exchange from 1907 to 1909.

In 1904, Forget was elected as a Conservative to the 10th Canadian Parliament for the Charlevoix riding, and he served for more than thirteen years. He was the father of Thérèse Casgrain and father-in-law of Pierre-François Casgrain, who was elected as a Liberal MP in Charlevoix in 1917.

Forget died in 1919 at the age of fifty-seven and was buried in the Roman Catholic Cimetière Notre-Dame-des-Neiges in Montreal. His home in Montreal's Golden Square Mile still stands today and is one of the buildings that are used by the Russian Consulate. His estate in Charlevoix is now part of Domaine Forget.
