= Louis Charles Alphonse Angers =

Canadian politician

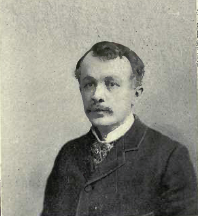

Member of the Canadian Parliament for Charlevoix
- In office 1896–1904
- Preceded by: Henry Simard
- Succeeded by: Rodolphe Forget

Personal details
- Born: 1854 La Malbaie, Canada East
- Died: March 11, 1929 (aged 74–75)
- Party: Liberal

Louis Charles Alphonse Angers (1854 – March 11, 1929) was a Canadian politician.

Angers was born in La Malbaie, Canada East, the son of Elie Angers, a blacksmith, and Marie Perron. He was educated at Laval Normal School. A lawyer by profession, Angers was first elected to the House of Commons of Canada in a January 1896 by-election in the riding of Charlevoix as a Liberal. He was re-elected in the 1896 and 1900 general elections. He was defeated in 1904.
