= Charles Laberge =

Canadian lawyer, journalist and political figure

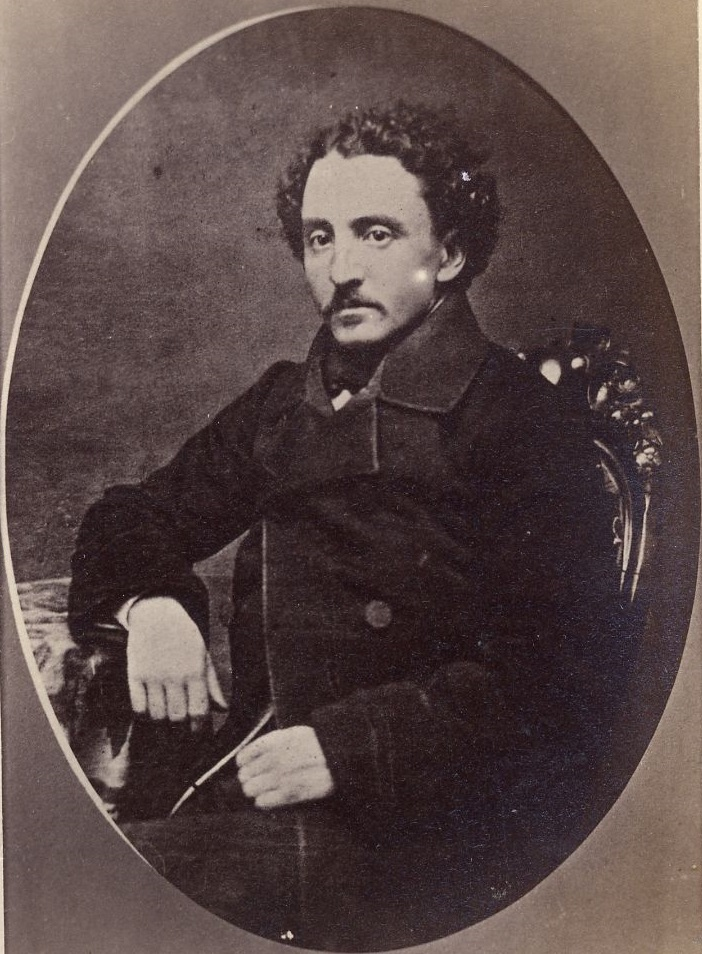

Charles Laberge (October 21, 1827 – August 3, 1874) was a Quebec lawyer, journalist and political figure.

He was born in Montreal, Lower Canada, in 1827 and studied at the Séminaire de Saint-Hyacinthe from 1838 to 1845, when he completed his classical studies. During his time in school, he helped found the Institut canadien de Montréal. He articled in law with René-Auguste-Richard Hubert at Montreal and was admitted to the bar in 1848. Laberge entered practice with Toussaint-Antoine-Rodolphe Laflamme, later setting up on his own at Saint-Jean-d'Iberville. He was an early contributor to the newspaper L'Avenir. He supported annexation with the United States. In 1854, Laberge was elected to the Legislative Assembly of the Province of Canada for Iberville as a member of the parti rouge. He was reelected in 1858 and was named solicitor general later that year; he retired from politics in 1860. Laberge was named Queen's Counsel in 1858. As a loyal Catholic, he was greatly disturbed when the church condemned the Institut canadien de Montréal in 1858. He married Hélène-Olive, daughter of Joseph-Ovide Turgeon, in 1859. In 1860, with Félix-Gabriel Marchand, he found the paper Le Franco-Canadien; he also contributed to L'Ordre at Montreal. In 1863, he was appointed judge in the Quebec Superior Court at Sorel. He opposed Confederation, but ran unsuccessfully in Saint-Jean in 1867. He served two terms as mayor of Saint-Jean-d'Iberville. In 1872, he became editor of Le National at Montreal.

He died in Montreal in 1874 and was buried in the Notre-Dame-des-Neiges Cemetery.

1867 Canadian federal election: St. John's
Party	Candidate	Votes
Liberal	François Bourassa	696
Unknown	Charles Laberge	600
Source: Canadian Elections Database
