= Auguste Maltais =

Canadian politician

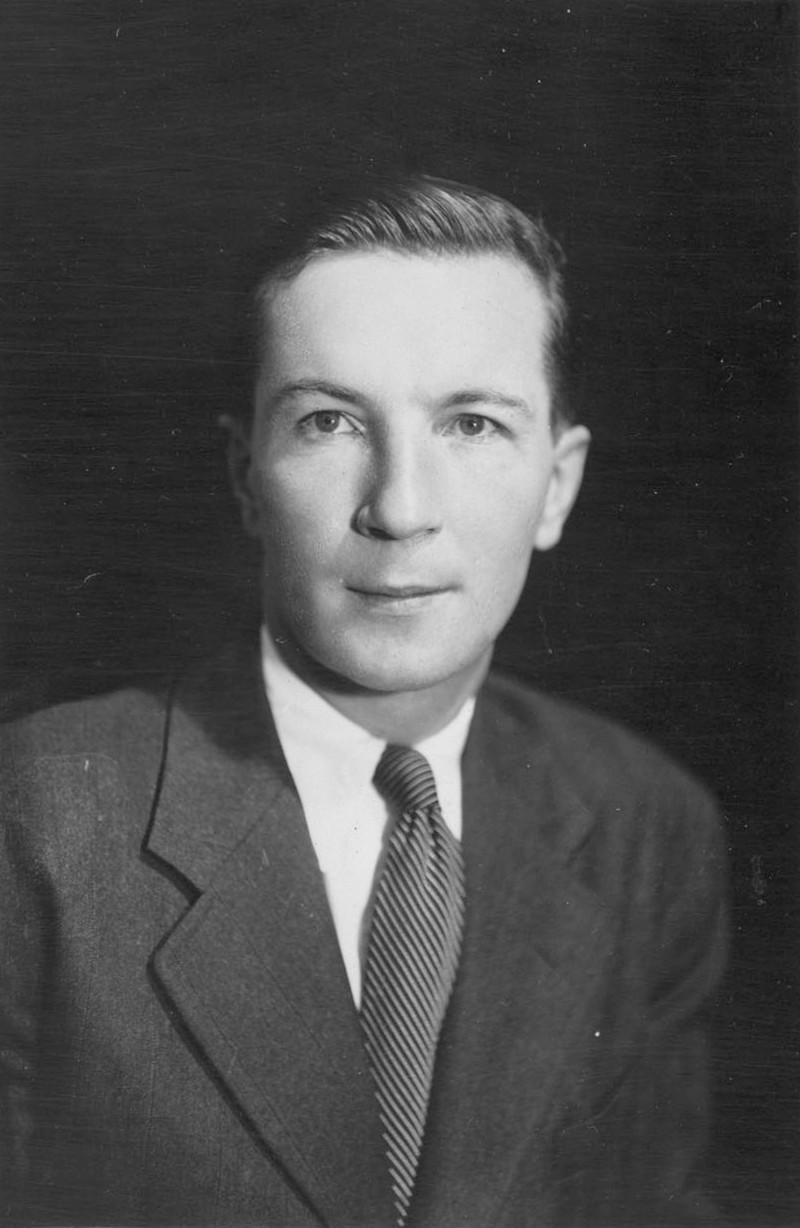

Member of Parliament for Charlevoix
- In office June 1949 – March 1958
- Preceded by: riding re-created
- Succeeded by: Martial Asselin

Personal details
- Born: 16 January 1916 La Malbaie, Quebec, Canada
- Died: 7 May 1988 (aged 72) Quebec City, Quebec, Canada
- Party: Liberal
- Profession: accountant

Auguste Maltais (16 January 1916 – 7 May 1988) was a Liberal party member of the House of Commons of Canada. He was an accountant by career.

He was first elected at the Charlevoix riding in the 1949 general election. Maltais was re-elected for successive terms in 1953 and 1957. In the 1958 election, he was defeated by Martial Asselin of the Progressive Conservative party. Maltais made one further attempt at a House of Commons seat in the 1962 election but was again unsuccessful.
