= Henry Simard =

Canadian politician

Member of the Canadian Parliament for Charlevoix
- In office 1891–1895
- Preceded by: Simon Cimon
- Succeeded by: Louis Charles Alphonse Angers

Personal details
- Born: 17 February 1836 Malbaie, Lower Canada
- Died: 6 November 1895 (aged 59)
- Party: Liberal

Henry Simard (17 February 1836 – 6 November 1895) was a Canadian merchant and political figure in Quebec, Canada. Simard served in the House of Commons of Canada from 1891 to 1895. During that time, he represented the electoral district of Charlevoix as a member of the Liberal Party of Canada.

Henry Simard was born on 17 February 1836 in Malbaie, Lower Canada to Thomas Simard. He was educated at the Collège de Sainte-Anne-de-la-Pocatière in the village of Sainte-Anne-de-la-Pocatière. In 1851, Simard married Justine Gagnon, the daughter of fellow Liberal political figure Adolphe Gagnon (b. 1810 - d. 1885). Simard served as an assistant inspector for Weights and Measures for Charlevoix for 15 years before he began his political career. He was elected to office on 5 March 1891 and died in office on 6 November 1895. He was 59 years old at the time of his death and he had served approximately 1,708 days (4 years, 8 months, and 4 days) in office.
