= St. John's (electoral district) =

Former federal electoral district in Quebec, Canada

Quebec electoral district

Defunct federal electoral district
- Legislature: House of Commons
- District created: 1867
- District abolished: 1892
- First contested: 1867
- Last contested: 1891

St. John's (French: Saint-Jean, pronounced [sɛ̃ ʒɑ̃]) was a federal electoral district in Quebec, Canada that was represented in the House of Commons of Canada from 1867 to 1892.

It was created by the British North America Act, 1867. It consisted of the Parishes of Saint Luc, Blairfindie, Saint Jean, Saint Valentin and Lacolle, and the islands in the River Richelieu lying near those parishes.

The electoral district was abolished in 1892, when it was redistributed into Missisquoi and St. Johns—Iberville ridings.

== Members of Parliament ==
This riding elected the following members of Parliament:

Parliament	Years	Member	Party
St. John's
1st	1867–1872	François Bourassa	Liberal
2nd	1872–1874	François Bourassa	Liberal
3rd	1874–1878	François Bourassa	Liberal
4th	1878–1882	François Bourassa	Liberal
5th	1882–1887	François Bourassa	Liberal
6th	1887–1891	François Bourassa	Liberal
7th	1891–1896	François Bourassa	Liberal
Riding dissolved into St. Johns—Iberville and Missisquoi

== Election results ==
1867 Canadian federal election
Party	Candidate	Votes
Liberal	François Bourassa	696
Unknown	Charles Laberge	600
Source: Canadian Elections Database

1872 Canadian federal election
Party	Candidate	Votes
Liberal	François Bourassa	acclaimed
Source: Canadian Elections Database

1874 Canadian federal election
Party	Candidate	Votes
Liberal	François Bourassa	acclaimed
Source: lop.parl.ca

1878 Canadian federal election
Party	Candidate	Votes
Liberal	François Bourassa	780
Unknown	Chs. Loupret	583

1882 Canadian federal election
Party	Candidate	Votes
Liberal	François Bourassa	892
Unknown	Chas. Arpin	747

1887 Canadian federal election
Party	Candidate	Votes
Liberal	François Bourassa	988
Liberal	Elz. Paradis	628

1891 Canadian federal election
Party	Candidate	Votes
Liberal	François Bourassa	997
Conservative	J. Black	769

== See also ==
- List of Canadian electoral districts
- Historical federal electoral districts of Canada
