= Simon Cimon =

Canadian politician

Member of the Canadian Parliament for Charlevoix
- In office 1887–1891
- Preceded by: Simon-Xavier Cimon
- Succeeded by: Henry Simard

Personal details
- Born: 15 December 1852 Murray Bay, Canada East
- Died: 22 March 1903 (aged 50) Saint-Étienne-de-la-Malbaie, Quebec
- Party: Conservative

Simon Cimon (15 December 1852 – 22 March 1903) was a Quebec civil engineer and political figure. He represented Charlevoix in the House of Commons of Canada as a Conservative member from 1887 to 1891.

== Life ==
He was born at La Malbaie, Canada East in 1852, the son of Simon-Xavier Cimon, and studied at the Collège de Montmagny and Thom's Academy in Quebec. He was also a Provincial Land Surveyor for the province of Quebec. He served as an engineer for the Grenville Canal and then was engineer for the Quebec, Montreal, Ottawa and Occidental Railway.

From 1879 to 1887, Cimon was employed by the Canadian Department of Public Works. In 1884, he married Marie-Julie-Charlotte-Amanda, the daughter of Paschal-Vinceslas Taché, sheriff for Kamouraska. He was elected to represent Charlevoix in the House of Commons following the death of his father in 1887.

== Death ==
He died at Saint-Étienne-de-la-Malbaie in 1903.
