= Pierre-Alexis Tremblay =

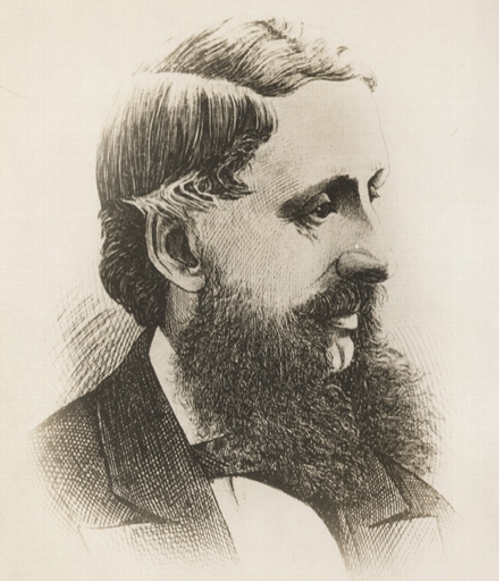

Member of the Canadian Parliament for Chicoutimi—Saguenay
- In office 1867–1872
- Succeeded by: William Evan Price

Member of the Canadian Parliament for Charlevoix
- In office 1872–1876
- Preceded by: Simon-Xavier Cimon
- Succeeded by: Hector-Louis Langevin
- In office 1878–1879
- Preceded by: Hector-Louis Langevin
- Succeeded by: Joseph-Stanislas Perrault

Member of the Legislative Assembly of Quebec for Chicoutimi-Saguenay
- In office 1867–1874
- Succeeded by: Michel Guillaume Baby

Member of the Legislative Assembly of the Province of Canada for Chicoutimi—Saguenay
- In office 1863–1867
- Preceded by: David Edward Price
- Succeeded by: None

Personal details
- Born: December 27, 1827 La Malbaie, Lower Canada
- Died: January 4, 1879 (aged 51) Quebec City, Quebec
- Party: Liberal

Pierre-Alexis "Pitre" Tremblay (December 27, 1827 – January 4, 1879) was a surveyor and Quebec political figure. He was a Liberal Member of Parliament from 1867 to 1875 and 1878 to 1879.

He was born in La Malbaie, Lower Canada, in 1827 and studied at the Petit Séminaire of Quebec. Near the end of 1853, he began carrying out surveys in the Saguenay region. As a journalist, he contributed to a number of newspapers of the time: Le Canadien, La Nation, Le National, L’Événement and L’Éclaireur. He was elected to Legislative Assembly of the Province of Canada for Chicoutimi—Saguenay in an 1865 by-election.

In 1867, he was elected to the Legislative Assembly of Quebec in Chicoutimi-Saguenay; in the same year he was elected to the House of Commons of Canada in the same riding; such dual mandates were legal at the time. He was re-elected provincially in 1871 in the same seat, and in 1872 he was elected in Charlevoix federally. He resigned from the Quebec seat in 1874 when holding seats in both legislatures became illegal. His election in Charlevoix was invalidated in August 1875. He was defeated in a by-election held in 1876 but was able to overturn this result in the Supreme Court of Canada in 1877 by demonstrating that the Quebec clergy had exerted undue influence against him during the election. He represented Charlevoix federally from 1878 until his death in Quebec City in 1879.

From 1862 to 1868, he was involved with Félicité Angers, better known as the author Laure Conan, but he married Mary Ellen Connoly in 1870.
