= Huron Centre =

Former federal electoral district in Ontario, Canada

Huron Centre was a federal electoral district in Ontario, Canada, that was represented in the House of Commons of Canada from 1872 to 1882. This riding was created from parts of Huron North and Huron South ridings.

The Centre riding consisted of the Townships of Colborne, Hullet, McKillop, Tuckersmith, Grey, the Town of Goderich and the village of Seaforth.

The electoral district was abolished in 1882 when it was redistributed between Huron West and Huron South ridings.

== Members of Parliament ==
This riding has elected the following members of Parliament:

Parliament	Years	Member	Party
Riding created from Huron North and Huron South
2nd	1872–1874	Horace Horton	Liberal
3rd	1874–1878	Horace Horton	Liberal
4th	1878–1878	Horace Horton	Liberal
4th	1878–1882	Richard John Cartwright	Liberal
Riding dissolved into Huron West and Huron South

== Election results ==
1872 Canadian federal election
Party	Candidate	Votes
Liberal	HORTON, Horace	1,354
Unknown	WHITEHEAD, J.	868

1874 Canadian federal election
Party	Candidate	Votes
Liberal	HORTON, Horace	1,510
Unknown	CRABB, C.	730

1878 Canadian federal election
Party	Candidate	Votes
Liberal	HORTON, Horace	1,732
Unknown	PLATT, S.	1,361

On Mr. Horton's resignation:

By-election on 2 November 1878
Party	Candidate	Votes
Liberal	CARTWRIGHT, Hon. R.J.	2,002
Unknown	PLATT, S.	1,601

== See also ==
- List of Canadian electoral districts
- Historical federal electoral districts of Canada
