= Charlevoix (federal electoral district) =

Former federal electoral district in Quebec, Canada

Quebec electoral district

Defunct federal electoral district
- Legislature: House of Commons
- District created: 1947
- District abolished: 2003
- First contested: 1949
- Last contested: 2000

Charlevoix (French pronunciation: [ʃaʁləvwa]) was a federal electoral district in Quebec, Canada, that was represented in the House of Commons of Canada from 1867 to 1917 and from 1949 to 2004.

The district was created in the British North America Act 1867. It was abolished in 1914 when it was merged into Charlevoix—Montmorency. The district was created again in 1947 from Charlevoix—Saguenay. It was abolished again in 2003 when it was redistributed into Charlevoix—Montmorency and Manicouagan ridings.

The best-known person to represent this riding is Brian Mulroney who was Member of Parliament for the riding, for part of his term as Prime Minister of Canada, from 1988 to 1993.

== Members of Parliament ==
This riding elected the following members of the House of Commons of Canada:

Parliament	Years	Member	Party
Charlevoix
1st	1867–1872	Simon-Xavier Cimon	Conservative
2nd	1872–1874	Pierre-Alexis Tremblay	Liberal
3rd	1874–1876	Pierre-Alexis Tremblay	Liberal
3rd	1876–1877	Hector-Louis Langevin	Conservative
3rd	1877–1878	Hector-Louis Langevin	Conservative
4th	1878–1879	Pierre-Alexis Tremblay	Liberal
4th	1879–1881	Joseph-Stanislas Perrault	Conservative
4th	1881–1882	Simon-Xavier Cimon	Conservative
5th	1882–1887	Simon-Xavier Cimon	Conservative
6th	1887–1887	Simon-Xavier Cimon	Independent Liberal
6th	1887–1891	Simon Cimon	Conservative
7th	1891–1895	Henry Simard	Liberal
7th	1896–1896	Louis-Charles-Alphonse Angers	Liberal
8th	1896–1900	Louis-Charles-Alphonse Angers	Liberal
9th	1900–1904	Louis-Charles-Alphonse Angers	Liberal
10th	1904–1908	Rodolphe Forget	Conservative
11th	1908–1911	Rodolphe Forget	Conservative
12th	1911–1917	Rodolphe Forget	Conservative
Riding dissolved into Charlevoix—Montmorency
Riding re-created from Charlevoix—Saguenay
21st	1949–1953	Auguste Maltais	Liberal
22nd	1953–1957	Auguste Maltais	Liberal
23rd	1957–1958	Auguste Maltais	Liberal
24th	1958–1962	Martial Asselin	Progressive Conservative
25th	1962–1963	Louis-Philippe-Antoine Bélanger	Social Credit
26th	1963–1965	Louis-Philippe-Antoine Bélanger	Social Credit
27th	1965–1968	Martial Asselin	Progressive Conservative
28th	1968–1972	Martial Asselin	Progressive Conservative
29th	1972–1974	Gilles Caouette	Social Credit
30th	1974–1979	Charles Lapointe	Liberal
31st	1979–1980	Charles Lapointe	Liberal
32nd	1980–1984	Charles Lapointe	Liberal
33rd	1984–1988	Charles-André Hamelin	Progressive Conservative
34th	1988–1993	Brian Mulroney	Progressive Conservative
35th	1993–1997	Gérard Asselin	Bloc Québécois
36th	1997–2000	Gérard Asselin	Bloc Québécois
37th	2000–2004	Gérard Asselin	Bloc Québécois
Riding dissolved into Charlevoix—Montmorency and Manicouagan

== Election results ==
1867 Canadian federal election
Party	Candidate	Votes
Conservative	Simon-Xavier Cimon	999
Unknown	Adolphe Gagnon	911
Source: Canadian Elections Database

1872 Canadian federal election
Party	Candidate	Votes
Liberal	Pierre-Alexis Tremblay	1,485
Conservative	Simon-Xavier Cimon	779
Source: Canadian Elections Database

1874 Canadian federal election
Party	Candidate	Votes
Liberal	Pierre-Alexis Tremblay	1,377
Conservative	Pierre-Joseph-Olivier Chauveau	1,104
Source: Canadian Elections Database

By-election on 22 January 1876 Election declared void
Party	Candidate	Votes
Conservative	Hector-Louis Langevin	952
Liberal	Pierre-Alexis Tremblay	741

By-election on 23 March 1877 By-election declared void
Party	Candidate	Votes
Conservative	Hector-Louis Langevin	1,185
Liberal	Pierre-Alexis Tremblay	1,129

1878 Canadian federal election: Charlevoix
Party	Candidate	Votes
Liberal	Pierre-Alexis Tremblay	1,052
Unknown	Joseph-Stanislas Perrault	936

By-election on 13 February 1879 Tremblay's death, 5 January 1879
Party	Candidate	Votes
Conservative	Joseph-Stanislas Perrault	1,077
Conservative	Simon-Xavier Cimon	898

By-election on 19 March 1881 By-election declared void
Party	Candidate	Votes
Conservative	Simon-Xavier Cimon	929
Conservative	Joseph-Stanislas Perrault	854

1882 Canadian federal election
Party	Candidate	Votes
Conservative	Simon-Xavier Cimon	954
Unknown	J.A.J. Kane	601

1887 Canadian federal election
Party	Candidate	Votes
Independent Liberal	Simon-Xavier Cimon	903
Nationalist	J.A. Tremblay	819
Unknown	C.H.A. Clement	688
Unknown	J.A. Hamel	309

By-election on 28 September 1887 Cimon's death, 26 June 1887
Party	Candidate	Votes
Conservative	Simon-Xavier Cimon Jr.	1,436
Unknown	J.A. Tremblay	1,025

1891 Canadian federal election
Party	Candidate	Votes
Liberal	Henry Simard	1,542
Conservative	Simon-Xavier Cimon Jr.	1,235

By-election on 27 January 1896 Simard's death, 6 November 1895
Party	Candidate	Votes
Liberal	Louis Charles Alphonse Angers	acclaimed

1896 Canadian federal election
Party	Candidate	Votes
Liberal	Louis Charles Alphonse Angers	1,403
Conservative	Simon-Xavier Cimon Jr.	1,273

1900 Canadian federal election
Party	Candidate	Votes
Liberal	Louis Charles Alphonse Angers	1,517
Conservative	Simon-Xavier Cimon Jr.	1,342

1904 Canadian federal election
Party	Candidate	Votes
Conservative	Rodolphe Forget	1,684
Liberal	Louis Charles Alphonse Angers	1,601

1908 Canadian federal election
Party	Candidate	Votes
Conservative	Rodolphe Forget	1,934
Liberal	Joseph Camille Pouliot	1,725

1911 Canadian federal election
Party	Candidate	Votes
Conservative	Rodolphe Forget	2,020
Liberal	Lucien Cannon	1,358

1949 Canadian federal election
Party	Candidate	Votes
Liberal	Auguste Maltais	9,543
Independent	Emile Boiteau	4,402
Progressive Conservative	Joseph-Hidas-Aimé Dufour	1,608
Union des électeurs	Pierre Simard	940
Independent Liberal	Donat Lacroix	217

1953 Canadian federal election
Party	Candidate	Votes
Liberal	Auguste Maltais	10,742
Progressive Conservative	Frédéric Dorion	7,259

1957 Canadian federal election
Party	Candidate	Votes
Liberal	Auguste Maltais	10,182
Progressive Conservative	Guy Dorion	7,532
Social Credit	Jean-Louis Hudon	246
Independent Liberal	Jos. Gignac	213

1958 Canadian federal election
Party	Candidate	Votes
Progressive Conservative	Martial Asselin	12,315
Liberal	Auguste Maltais	7,918

1962 Canadian federal election
Party	Candidate	Votes
Social Credit	Louis-Philippe-Antoine Bélanger	8,645
Progressive Conservative	Martial Asselin	6,341
Liberal	Auguste Maltais	5,408

1963 Canadian federal election
Party	Candidate	Votes
Social Credit	Louis-Philippe-Antoine Bélanger	7,390
Progressive Conservative	Martial Asselin	6,843
Liberal	Meredy Bouchard	5,787

1965 Canadian federal election
Party	Candidate	Votes
Progressive Conservative	Martial Asselin	6,844
Liberal	Aimé Racine	6,676
Ralliement créditiste	J.-Adélard Froment	5,556
New Democratic	Paul-Henri Dufresne	556

1968 Canadian federal election
Party	Candidate	Votes
Progressive Conservative	Martial Asselin	9,487
Liberal	Aimé Racine	8,282
Ralliement créditiste	Raymond Poulin	3,831
New Democratic	Reginald Boulay	1,070

1972 Canadian federal election
Party	Candidate	Votes
Social Credit	Gilles Caouette	10,264
Liberal	Jean-Guy Alain	10,105
Progressive Conservative	Pierre-Paul Savard	5,747

1974 Canadian federal election
Party	Candidate	Votes
Liberal	Charles Lapointe	10,372
Social Credit	Gilles Caouette	8,905
Progressive Conservative	Gualbert Tremblay	4,942
New Democratic	Gaétan Tremblay	692

1979 Canadian federal election
Party	Candidate	Votes
Liberal	Charles Lapointe	18,031
Social Credit	Gabriel-Yvan Gagnon	8,004
Progressive Conservative	Paul-André Tremblay	4,503
New Democratic	Normand Laforce	613
Union populaire	Margot Kaszap	251

1980 Canadian federal election
Party	Candidate	Votes
Liberal	Charles Lapointe	22,130
Progressive Conservative	Jean-Pierre Dufour	5,679
New Democratic	Normand Laforce	1,273
Social Credit	Angelo Emond	1,021
Rhinoceros	Guy "Pantouffe" Laliberté	945
Union populaire	Lise Brodeur	232
lop.parl.ca

1984 Canadian federal election
Party	Candidate	Votes
Progressive Conservative	Charles-André Hamelin	23,661
Liberal	Charles Lapointe	11,906
New Democratic	Jocelyn Toulouse	1,022
Parti nationaliste	Victorien Pilote	610

1988 Canadian federal election
Party	Candidate	Votes
Progressive Conservative	Brian Mulroney	33,730
Liberal	Martin Cauchon	5,994
New Democratic	Kenneth Choquette	1,819
Rhinoceros	François Yo Gourd	600

1993 Canadian federal election
Party	Candidate	Votes
Bloc Québécois	Gérard Asselin	23,615
Liberal	André Desgagnés	7,140
Progressive Conservative	Gérard Guy	6,781
New Democratic	Audrey Carpentier	552

1997 Canadian federal election
Party	Candidate	Votes
Bloc Québécois	Gérard Asselin	19,792
Liberal	Ghislain Maltais	9,838
Progressive Conservative	Nicole Massicotte	6,443
New Democratic	François Dumoutier	454

2000 Canadian federal election
Party	Candidate	Votes	%	±%	Expenditures
Bloc Québécois	Gérard Asselin	20,479	61.44		$74,392
Liberal	Marjolaine Gagnon	9,308	27.93	–	$36,028
Alliance	Pierre Paradis	1,905	5.72		$10,782
Progressive Conservative	Doris Grondin	1,154	3.46		$91
New Democratic	Joss Duhaime	484	1.45		$180
Total valid votes		33,330	100.00		
Total rejected ballots		923			
Turnout		34,253	58.32		
Electors on the lists		58,737			
Sources: Official Results, Elections Canada and Financial Returns, Elections Canada.

== See also ==
- List of Canadian electoral districts
- Historical federal electoral districts of Canada

Parliament of Canada
Preceded by Manicouagan	Constituency represented by the Prime Minister; 1988–1993	Succeeded by Vancouver Centre
