= Horace Horton =

Canadian politician

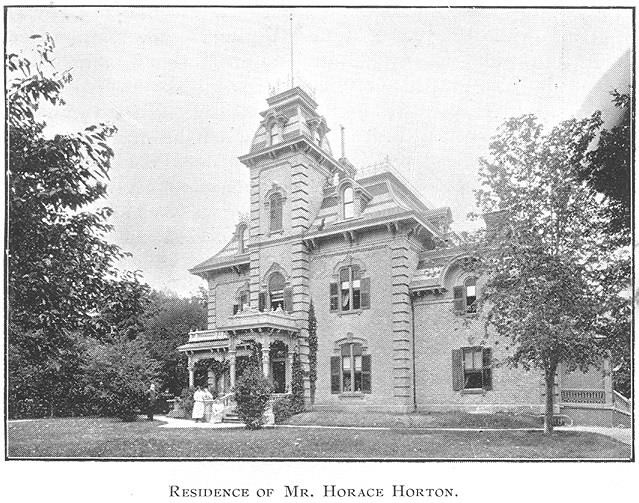
Built 1873 and still standing in Goderich Ontario

Horace Horton (October 9, 1823 – February 18, 1902) was a Canadian insurance agent and political figure. He represented Huron Centre in the House of Commons of Canada from 1872 to 1878 as a Liberal member.

He was born in Stalisfield, Kent, England, the son of Henry Horton, came to Upper Canada with his family in 1831 and was educated in Goderich. He married Hannah, the daughter of Robert Gibbons. He was mayor of Goderich from 1872 to 1874. Horton resigned in October 1878 to accept a post in the office of the Auditor General.
