= Harvey William Burk =

Canadian politician

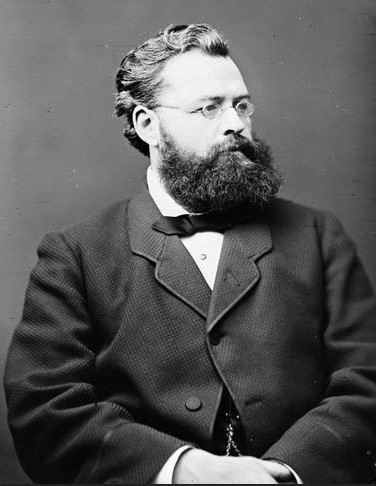
- Burk, c. 1879

Member of the Canadian Parliament for Durham West
- In office 1874–1879
- Preceded by: Edmund Burke Wood
- Succeeded by: Edward Blake

Personal details
- Born: 1822 Darlington Township, Upper Canada
- Died: October 13, 1907 (aged 84–85)
- Party: Liberal
- Occupation: farmer

Harvey William Burk (1822 in Darlington Township, Upper Canada – October 13, 1907) was a politician and farmer.

Burk was educated in Darlington Township. He was married twice: to Roley Williams in 1848 and to Susan Armour in 1859. He operated a farm near Bowmanville. Burk served on the township council and was reeve from 1873 to 1874. He was elected to the House of Commons of Canada as a Member the Liberal Party to represent Durham West in 1874. He won a landslide victory in 1878. Burk resigned October 18, 1879 to allow Edward Blake to be elected.

His daughter Mary Emily married controversial journalist and politician Sam Hughes.
