= François Bourassa =

Canadian politician

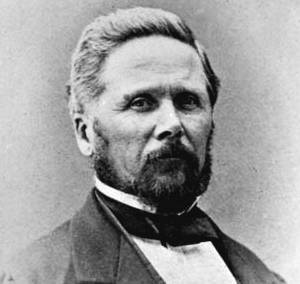
François Bourassa Source: Library and Archives Canada

François Bourassa (French pronunciation: [fʁɑ̃swa buʁasa]; June 5, 1813 – May 13, 1898) was a Quebec farmer and political figure. He represented Saint-Jean in the House of Commons of Canada as a Liberal member from 1867 to 1896.

He was born in Sainte-Marguerite-de-Blairfindie, Lower Canada in 1813. His father, also named François, was the first mayor of the town. He took part in the Lower Canada Rebellion, was arrested but later released and later served as captain in the local militia. He settled at Saint-Jean and represented the town on the council for Chambly County. In 1854, he was elected to the Legislative Assembly of the Province of Canada for Saint-Jean as a member of the parti rouge; he served under the Canadian Confederation, when he was elected to the federal parliament, although he opposed confederation. Bourassa spoke no English. He retired from politics in 1896. He served as mayor of l'Acadie in 1858.

He died in Saint-Valentin in 1898.

His brother Napoléon was a Quebec painter, writer, sculptor and architect and his nephew Henri Bourassa served in the Legislative Assembly of Quebec and the House of Commons.

== Electoral record ==
1867 Canadian federal election: St. John's
Party	Candidate	Votes
Liberal	François Bourassa	696
Unknown	Charles Laberge	600
Source: Canadian Elections Database

1872 Canadian federal election: St. John's
Party	Candidate	Votes
Liberal	François Bourassa	acclaimed
Source: Canadian Elections Database

1874 Canadian federal election: St. John's
Party	Candidate	Votes
Liberal	François Bourassa	acclaimed
Source: lop.parl.ca

1878 Canadian federal election: St. John's
Party	Candidate	Votes
Liberal	François Bourassa	780
Unknown	Chs. Loupret	583

1882 Canadian federal election: St. John's
Party	Candidate	Votes
Liberal	François Bourassa	892
Unknown	Chas. Arpin	747

1887 Canadian federal election: St. John's
Party	Candidate	Votes
Liberal	François Bourassa	988
Liberal	Elz. Paradis	628

1891 Canadian federal election: St. John's
Party	Candidate	Votes
Liberal	François Bourassa	997
Conservative	J. Black	769
