= Joseph-Stanislas Perrault =

Canadian politician

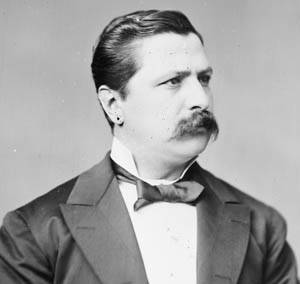

Member of the Canadian Parliament for Charlevoix
- In office 1878–1881
- Preceded by: Pierre-Alexis Tremblay
- Succeeded by: Simon-Xavier Cimon

Personal details
- Born: May 13, 1846 L'Assomption, Canada East
- Died: March 9, 1907 (aged 60)
- Party: Conservative

Joseph-Stanislas Perrault (May 13, 1846 – March 9, 1907) was a Canadian lawyer and political figure in Quebec. He represented Charlevoix in the House of Commons of Canada from 1879 to 1881 as a Conservative member.

Born in L'Assomption, Canada East, he was the son of Édouard Perrault and Émilie Mathurin dit Gerbourg. Perrault was educated at the college in L'Assomption and at the Université Laval. He was called to the Quebec bar in 1870 and set up practice at Quebec City and later at La Malbaie. Perrault served as crown prosecutor for the Saguenay district. In 1873, he married Maria Louisa Brault. Perrault was defeated by Pierre-Alexis Tremblay in the 1878 federal election but was elected in an 1879 by-election held after Tremblay's death. In 1881, his election was declared void after an appeal and he lost the by-election held later that year to Simon-Xavier Cimon. He died at Arthabaska at the age of 60.

His sons Joseph-Édouard, Gustave and Antonio all became lawyers and Joseph-Édouard served in the Quebec legislative assembly.
