= Simon-Xavier Cimon =

Canadian politician

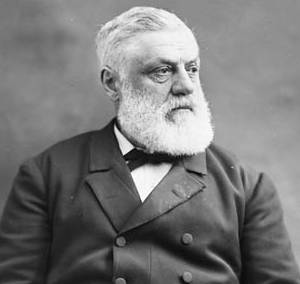

Member of the Canadian Parliament for Charlevoix
- In office 1867–1872
- Succeeded by: Pierre-Alexis Tremblay
- In office 1881–1887
- Preceded by: Joseph-Stanislas Perrault
- Succeeded by: Simon Cimon

Personal details
- Born: December 4, 1829 Murray Bay, Lower Canada
- Died: June 26, 1887 (aged 57)
- Party: Conservative

Simon-Xavier Cimon (December 4, 1829 – June 26, 1887) was a businessman and political figure in Quebec, Canada. He represented Charlevoix in the House of Commons of Canada as a Conservative member from 1867 to 1872 and from 1881 to 1887.

He was born in La Malbaie, Lower Canada in 1829 and studied at the Petit Séminaire de Québec. He became a building contractor and built the parliament buildings at Quebec City in 1878. Cimon established a pulp and paper mill at La Malbaie during the 1880s. With Edmund James Flynn, he owned the Journal de Québec. In 1884, he helped establish a weekly newspaper L'Écho des Laurentides at La Malbaie. He died at La Malbaie of apoplexy in 1887 while still in office.

His son Simon succeeded him in the House of Commons as representative for Charlevoix.

His brother Cléophe had represented Charlevoix in the legislative assembly for the Province of Canada.
