= Hector-Louis Langevin =

Canadian Father of Confederation (1826–1906)

The Honourable Sir Hector-Louis Langevin PC KCMG CB KC
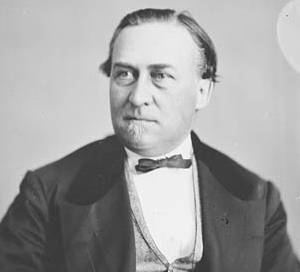
- Langevin in 1873

Secretary of State for Canada
- In office July 1, 1867 – December 8, 1867
- Preceded by: Office created
- Succeeded by: James Cox Aikins

Superintendent-General of Indian Affairs
- In office May 22, 1868 – December 7, 1869
- Preceded by: Office created
- Succeeded by: Joseph Howe

10th Mayor of Quebec City
- In office 1858–1861
- Preceded by: Joseph Morrin
- Succeeded by: Thomas Pope

Postmaster General of Canada
- In office October 19, 1878 – May 19, 1879
- Preceded by: Lucius Seth Huntington
- Succeeded by: Alexander Campbell

Personal details
- Born: August 25, 1826 Quebec City, Lower Canada
- Died: June 11, 1906 (aged 79) Quebec City, Quebec, Canada
- Party: Conservative
- Other political affiliations: Parti bleu
- Relations: Jean Langevin (brother)
- Profession: Editor; Lawyer

Sir Hector-Louis Langevin (French pronunciation: [ɛktɔʁlui -lwi lɑ̃ʒvɛ̃]; August 25, 1826 – June 11, 1906) was a Canadian lawyer, politician, and one of the Fathers of Confederation. He was the inaugural Secretary of State for Canada in 1867.

== Education ==
Langevin was born in Quebec City in 1826. He studied law and was called to the bar in 1850.

== Political career ==
In 1856, he was elected to the municipal council of Quebec City and served as mayor from 1858 to 1861. In 1857, he was elected Member of Parliament for Dorchester in the Legislative Assembly of the Province of Canada as a member of the Conservative Party. He held various positions in Cabinet, including Solicitor General (1864–66), Postmaster General (1866–67), Secretary of State for Canada (1867–69), Superintendent-General of Indian Affairs (1868–69), Minister of Public Works (1869–73) and acting Minister of Militia and Defence (1873). Langevin also attended all three conferences leading to Confederation. He left politics in 1873 due to his role in the Pacific Scandal.

In 1871, he was elected to the Legislative Assembly of Quebec in the provincial electoral district of Québec-Centre. At the time, dual mandates were still allowed. He served one term, until 1874.

In 1876, he was re-elected in the riding of Charlevoix. His opponent contested the election and it was declared invalid, but he won the subsequent by-election in 1877. He was defeated in Rimouski in 1878 but elected by acclamation in the riding of Trois-Rivières in the same year. Langevin became Minister of Public Works again in 1879. He lobbied behind the scenes against the hanging of Louis Riel in 1885 and was one of the few Conservative Members of Parliament to survive the resulting backlash in the province of Quebec in 1887.

He was promised the post of Lieutenant Governor of Quebec by the new Conservative Prime Minister John Abbott if he resigned as Minister of Public Works. Langevin stepped down in 1891 but Abbott appointed Joseph-Adolphe Chapleau instead. That year, Langevin was implicated with Thomas McGreevy in what became known as the "McGreevy-Langevin scandal" over kickbacks to McGreevy associated with federal contracts granted to him by the Department of Public Works overseen by Langevin. He retired to the backbenches and then left politics in 1896.

Outside politics, he was previously a newspaper editor.

== View on Indigenous Canadians ==
In 1883, he stated in Parliament "In order to educate the ('Indian') children properly we must separate them from their families. Some people may say that this is hard but if we want to civilize them we must do that." "The fact is that if you wish to educate the children you must separate them from their parents during the time they are being taught. If you leave them in the family they may know how to read and write, but they will remain savages, whereas by separating them in the way proposed, they acquire the habits and tastes…of civilized people."

== Posthumous recognition ==
The Langevin Block office building on Parliament Hill and the Langevin Bridge in Calgary were named in his honour. Langevin's group of honours insignia was sold at auction in Ottawa on May 18, 2010, for $8,000.00

On January 23, 2017, Calgary City Council voted to rename the Langevin Bridge to the Reconciliation Bridge. In June 2017 it was announced the Langevin Block would be renamed to the Office of the Prime Minister and Privy Council building due to Langevin's involvement in the Canadian Indian residential school system. In June 2021, a Calgary Board of Education public school was renamed Riverside School, after being Langevin School from 1936 until 2021.

== Personal life ==
Langevin's brother, Jean Langevin, was a Roman Catholic bishop.

== Archives ==
There is a Hector-Louis Langevin fonds at Library and Archives Canada and a family Hector Langevin fonds at Bibliothèque et Archives nationales du Québec.

== Electoral history ==
1867 Canadian federal election: Dorchester
| Party | Candidate | Votes |
|---|---|---|
| Conservative | Hector Langevin | acclaimed |
Source: Canadian Elections Database

1872 Canadian federal election: Dorchester
| Party | Candidate | Votes |
|---|---|---|
| Conservative | Hector-Louis Langevin | 1,044 |
| Unknown | E.H. Marceau | 724 |
Source: Canadian Elections Database

1891 Canadian federal election: Richelieu
| Party | Candidate | Votes |
|---|---|---|
| Conservative | Hector-Louis Langevin | 1,701 |
| Liberal | Lomer Gouin | 1,393 |
