= James Cockburn (Ontario politician) =

Father of Canadian Confederation (1819–1883)

James Cockburn QC
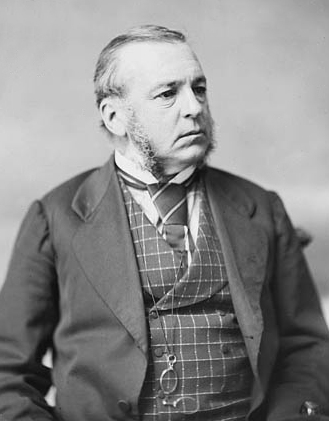
- Cockburn in May 1873

1st Speaker of the House of Commons
- In office November 6, 1867 – March 25, 1875
- Succeeded by: Timothy Anglin

Member of the Canadian Parliament for Northumberland West
- In office 1867–1874
- Succeeded by: William Kerr
- In office 1878–1881
- Preceded by: William Kerr
- Succeeded by: George Guillet

Personal details
- Born: February 13, 1819 Berwick-upon-Tweed, United Kingdom
- Died: August 14, 1883 (aged 64) Ottawa, Ontario, Canada
- Resting place: St. James Cemetery, Toronto, Ontario, Canada
- Party: Conservative
- Spouse: Isabella Susan Patterson (m. 1854)
- Children: 3

James W. Cockburn QC (February 13, 1819 – August 14, 1883) was a Canadian politician and a father of Canadian Confederation. He served as the first speaker of the House of Commons.

== Early life ==
He was born in Berwick-Upon-Tweed on the English–Scottish border and immigrated to Canada with his father, James Cockburn Snr. (1787–1832), mother, Sarah Turnbull (1797–1866) and brother, Adam (1820–1860), at the age of 13. After attending Upper Canada College and Osgoode Hall, he established a law practice in Cobourg, Ontario.

== Career ==
In the 1850s, Cockburn was elected to the town council. In 1861, he was elected to the Province of Canada's legislative assembly as a Reformer representing Northumberland West. Despite elected as an opponent of the Macdonald–Cartier administration, Cockburn switched allegiances and became a supporter of Macdonald's Liberal-Conservative Party.

Cockburn attended the Quebec Conference of 1864 as a supporter of Confederation. After Confederation, he was elected to the new House of Commons of Canada in the country's first election. He was nominated by Sir John A. Macdonald to be Canada's first speaker of the House of Commons, a position in which he served from 1867 to 1874.

His performance as Speaker was hindered by the fact that he spoke no French in a chamber in which both English and French were official languages. He did however understand French. In 1872, Cockburn was nominated for a second term as Speaker despite reservations by the Opposition that he had been too favourable to the government in his rulings. Cockburn lost his seat in the 1874 election that had been precipitated by the Pacific Scandal and that brought down the Macdonald government.

Cockburn won back his former seat in the 1878 election but did not take an active role in Parliament. He resigned in 1881 when he was appointed to collect and classify Canadian statutes but this assignment was cut short by his death.

== Death ==
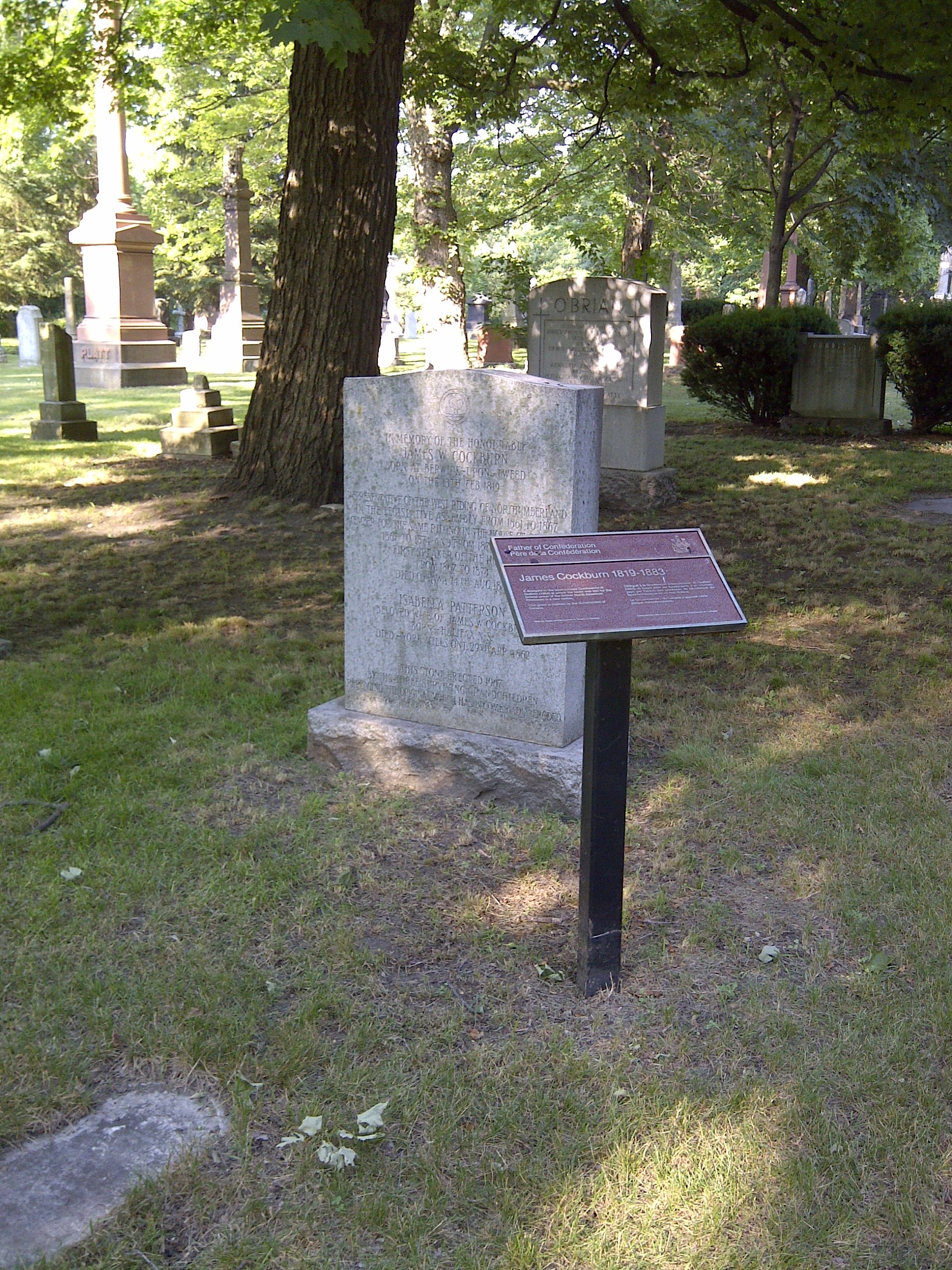
Grave of James Cockburn

Cockburn died on August 14, 1883, from sickness. He is buried in St. James Cemetery, in Toronto.

== Personal life ==
He married Isabella Susan Patterson in 1854 and they had three children: Sarah Isabella Cockburn, Francis Cockburn and May Cockburn.

== Electoral Record ==
By-election: On Mr. Keeler's death, 21 January 1881: East Riding of Northumberland
Party	Candidate	Votes
Independent Liberal	Darius Crouter	acclaimed

1882 Canadian federal election: East Riding of Northumberland
Party	Candidate	Votes
Conservative	Edward Cochrane	2,073
Independent Liberal	Darius Crouter	1,800
