= John B. McColl (Canadian politician) =

Canadian politician

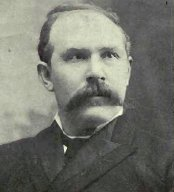

Member of the Canadian Parliament for Northumberland West
- In office 1900–1911
- Preceded by: George Guillet
- Succeeded by: Charles Arthur Munson

Personal details
- Born: January 26, 1861 Murray Township, Canada West
- Died: February 24, 1940 (aged 79)
- Party: Liberal

John B. McColl (January 26, 1861 – February 24, 1940) was a Canadian politician.

Born in Murray Township, Northumberland County, Canada West, the son of John H. and Martha McColl, McColl was educated at the Public School and the High School of Trenton, Ontario. A lawyer, he was a Member of the Town Council of Cobourg for one year and Deputy Reeve and Commissioner of the Town Trust of Cobourg for one year. He was an unsuccessful candidate for the electoral district of Northumberland West at the general elections of 1896. A Liberal, he elected to the House of Commons of Canada in the 1900, 1904, and 1908 elections. He was defeated in the 1911 election.
