= Frederick Robertson (politician) =

Canadian politician

Member of Parliament for Northumberland
- In office June 1949 – June 1957
- Preceded by: Earle Drope
- Succeeded by: Ben Thompson

Personal details
- Born: Frederick Greystock Robertson; 7 March 1909 Belleville, Ontario
- Died: 17 September 2002 (aged 93) Cobourg, Ontario
- Party: Liberal
- Spouse: Margaret R. Aitkins (m. 1936)
- Children: 3
- Profession: physician

Frederick Greystock Robertson (7 March 1909 – 17 September 2002) was a Liberal party member of the House of Commons of Canada.

Robertson was born in Belleville, Ontario and became a physician after receiving his MD degree at the University of Toronto. After working as a doctor in Cobourg, Ontario, he left his practice in July 1948 to work in the canning industry, eventually owning and managing the Cobourg-based Robertson Packers.

He was first elected to Parliament at the Northumberland riding in the 1949 general election and was re-elected for a second term in 1953. Robertson was defeated by Ben Thompson of the Progressive Conservative party in the 1957 election.

Robertson's father, William George Robertson, was a Liberal member of the Ontario Legislature between 1926 and 1929.
