= Henry Joseph Walker =

Canadian politician

Member of Parliament for Northumberland East
- In office 1911–1917
- Succeeded by: Riding was abolished in 1914 when it was merged into Northumberland

Personal details
- Born: November 28, 1849 Hillier Township, Canada West
- Died: March 21, 1918 (aged 68)
- Party: Conservative
- Profession: merchant

Henry Joseph Walker (November 28, 1849 in Hillier Township, Canada West – March 21, 1918) was a Canadian politician and merchant. He was elected in 1911 to the House of Commons of Canada as a Member of the historical Conservative Party for the riding of Northumberland East. Prior to his federal political experience, he was reeve and councillor of Percy Township, Ontario.

== Electoral record ==
1911 Canadian federal election: East Riding of Northumberland
| Party | Candidate | Votes |
|---|---|---|
| Conservative | Henry Joseph Walker | 2,518 |
| Liberal | Alexander Weatherson | 2,127 |
