= Milton Edgar Maybee =

Canadian politician

Member of Parliament for Northumberland
- In office December 1921 – May 1930
- Preceded by: Charles Arthur Munson
- Succeeded by: William Alexander Fraser

Personal details
- Born: Milton Edgar Maybee; 8 November 1872 Murray Township, Ontario, Canada
- Died: 3 February 1947 (aged 74)
- Party: Conservative
- Spouse(s): Gertrude Pake m. 27 November 1895
- Profession: farmer, rancher

Milton Edgar Maybee (8 November 1872 – 3 February 1947) was a Conservative member of the House of Commons of Canada. He was born in Murray Township, Ontario and became a farmer and rancher.

Maybee attended secondary school in Trenton, Ontario then studied at Albert College in Belleville.

From 1917 to 1920, Maybee served as reeve of Murray Township. In 1919, he became Justice of the Peace for the United Counties of Northumberland and Durham and the following year became a county warden.

He was first elected to Parliament at the Northumberland, Ontario riding in the 1921 general election then re-elected in 1925 and 1926. Maybee was defeated by William Alexander Fraser (politician) of the Liberal party in the 1930 federal election.
