= Earle Drope =

Canadian politician

Member of Parliament for Northumberland
- In office June 1945 – June 1949
- Preceded by: William Alexander Fraser
- Succeeded by: Frederick Robertson

Personal details
- Born: Robert Earle Drope; 14 October 1898 Harwood, Ontario
- Died: 7 October 1969 (aged 70)
- Party: Progressive Conservative
- Spouse(s): Clara Phylis Sandercock m. 3 January 1923
- Profession: farmer, manager

Robert Earle Drope (14 October 1898 – 7 October 1969) was a Progressive Conservative party member of the House of Commons of Canada. He was born in Harwood, Ontario and became a farmer and manager by career.

Drope served in the military during World War I, attaining the rank of major. Later, he was a municipal councillor for Hamilton Township for five years. He also managed the Harwood Cooperative Creamery.

He was first elected to Parliament at the Northumberland riding in the 1945 general election, serving one term in office until his defeat in 1949 by Frederick Robertson of the Liberal party.
