= Harry Oliver Bradley =

Canadian politician

Member of the Canadian Parliament for Northumberland
- In office 1962–1963
- Preceded by: Benjamin Cope Thompson
- Succeeded by: Pauline Jewett

Personal details
- Born: November 24, 1929 Welland, Ontario, Canada
- Died: March 16, 1990 (aged 60)
- Party: Progressive Conservative Party
- Occupation: teacher

Harry Oliver Bradley (November 24, 1929 – March 16, 1990) was a Canadian politician and teacher. He was elected to the House of Commons of Canada in the 1962 election as a Member of the Progressive Conservative Party for the riding of Northumberland. He was defeated in the 1963 election.
