= Eliza Warren =

English writer (1810–1900)

- Born: 1810
- Died: 1900 (aged 89–90)
- Occupation: Journalist

Eliza Warren née Jervis (1810–1900) was an English writer on needlework and household management, and editor of the Ladies' Treasury magazine. She was best-known professionally by the pen-name Mrs. Warren, but after a second marriage was also known as Eliza Francis and Eliza Warren Francis.

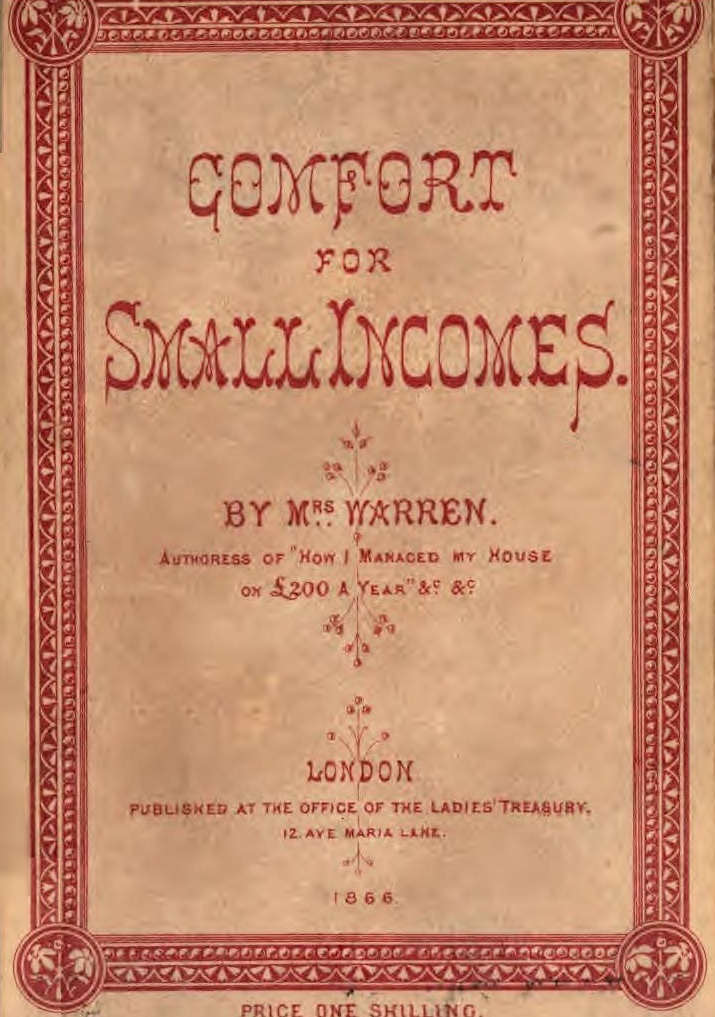
Cover of Comfort for Small Incomes by Mrs. Warren, "published at the office of the Ladies' Treasury", 1866

== Writing and editing ==
Her first books, in the later 1840s, were collections of crochet patterns for clothing and decorative items for the home. She created over 50 illustrated fancy needlework designs for the short-lived Drawing-room Magazine, with associated lessons offered in a London showroom, and contributed patterns to Family Friend. The Drawing-room Magazine, which she probably edited herself, contained fiction, poetry and informative articles, as did her later magazine Timethrift, which survived for just six issues.

Books like Cookery for Maids of All Work and Comfort for Small Incomes offered advice on the management of modest middle-class homes. Warren began to write on these household subjects in the 1850s. Sometimes her work was presented as the "autobiographical" story of a fictional character, even when clearly labelled on the title page as "by Mrs. Warren": for instance, How I Managed my Children from Infancy to Marriage. Like How I Managed on £200 a Year, this book used the character of an experienced housekeeper to give advice to a novice: a dialogue format used in evangelical literature of the period.

In 1857, Warren became editor of the Ladies’ Treasury, a new magazine which described itself as an "illustrated magazine of entertaining literature, education, fine art, domestic economy, needlework, and fashion". The publication was "handsomely printed on good paper" and ran successfully for nearly 40 years. Mrs. Warren's name helped promote the needlework articles, and it was also on a column called Cookery for All Incomes. She is presumed to have also written other pieces signed with various combinations of her names and initials. Warren Francis was a "masculine" byline for articles about history, geography and other non-domestic subjects.

The Ladies’ Treasury was popular and well received at the time. The Civil Service Gazette even called it "the best of all the magazines designed for the use of ladies". Its main competitor was the Beetons' Englishwoman's Domestic Magazine, and one of Mrs. Beeton's recent biographers has suggested the Ladies’ Treasury was an inferior "copycat". Others disagree and have called Eliza Warren "remarkably prolific and enterprising".

The two writers may have been aiming at somewhat different markets. Eliza Warren's advice was suitable for households with just one servant. In her books especially, she encouraged frugality and was concerned with "moral management of the home". Some journals, like the Churchman's Shilling Magazine, ran stories about young adults who learned domestic budget management from reading Mrs. Warren's books. Meanwhile, Mrs. Beeton and other Victorian writers on household management implied that their middle-class readers had a variety of servants and leisure to entertain and socialise.

== Life ==
Eliza Jervis was born on 23 December 1810 in Wells, Somerset, and was the eldest of the six children of a draper. After marrying a commercial traveller called Walter Warren in 1836 she moved to London. Within a couple of years of being widowed unexpectedly in 1844 she started publishing needlework manuals. Her next marriage in 1851, to Frederic Francis, a customs officer, lasted less than five years before Eliza found herself a widow again. If she had any children they did not survive infancy.

While she kept up a steady stream of book and magazine work for 20 years and more after Frederic's death, she also moved out of London to Surrey and started a boarding house. She lived there with about half a dozen lodgers and one or two servants until the 1890s. As well as handling these responsibilities, over the years she had provided a home for a niece and nephew, and, as the eldest daughter of a sick mother, had learnt to manage household duties from a young age. Her experience fitted her for writing on household management, but she had to give the impression of being the well-established mother of a family, like her competitors in the domestic advice business, and so she kept the facts of her own life vague enough to support her writing career and professional persona.

== Works ==
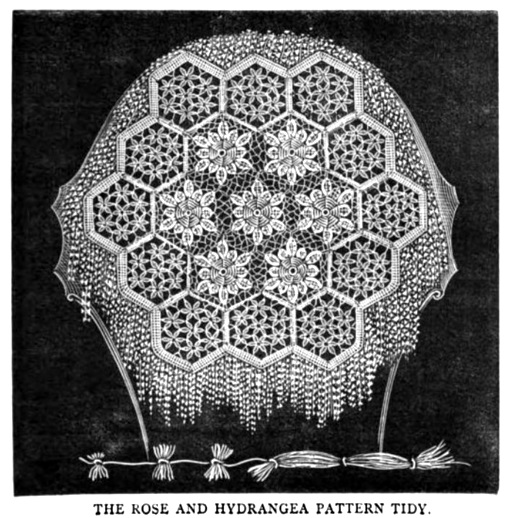
Picture to go with crochet pattern in the Ladies' Treasury for a "Persian Rose-Pattern Tidy", by Mrs. Warren, March 1870

=== Needlework and crafts ===
- The Court Crochet Doyley book, with original patterns, ornamentally illustrated
- The Point-Lace Crochet Collar Book
- The Court Crochet Collar and Cuff Book, with original patterns, ornamentally illustrated, etc.
- The short-way crochet edging book
- Treasures in needlework : comprising instructions in knitting, netting, crochet, point lace, tatting, braiding, and embroidery: illustrated with useful and ornamental designs, patterns, &c, co-author Mrs. Pullan
- Elegant work for delicate fingers, consisting of designs for crochet work, knitting [&c.] by M. Girardin, Mrs. Warren, and Mrs. Pullan, under the superintendence of the editor of Enquire within upon everything
- Sixteen Fancy-Work Designs for sofa and chair tidies: in crochet, netting, etc.
- Twenty-eight Needlework Designs in tatting, crochet, knitting, tape-work, etc.
- Six Designs in Potichomanie [art of imitating painted porcelain ware]
- The art of imitating oil paintings without a knowledge of drawing

=== Household management and cookery ===
- How I Managed my House on £200 a Year (1864)
- How I Managed my Children from Infancy to Marriage (1865)
- Comfort for Small Incomes (1866)
- How the Lady-Help taught girls to cook and be useful
- The sixpenny economical cookery book : for housewives, cooks, and maids-of-all-work, with hints to the mistress and servant
- The Way it is done. [Practical suggestions on hygiene and domestic economy.]
- A house and its furnishings; how to choose a house and furnish it at a small expense.
- A young wife's perplexities: with hints on the training and instruction of young servants.
- Cookery Cards for the Kitchen, etc.
- Cookery for an income of £200 a year
- My Lady-Help, and what she taught me.

=== Magazine ===
- The Ladies' Treasury, 1857-1895, published monthly in London by Cassell, Petter, and Galpin, then Ward & Lock, then Bemrose and Sons.
