= George Hees =

Canadian politician

The Honourable George Hees PC OC
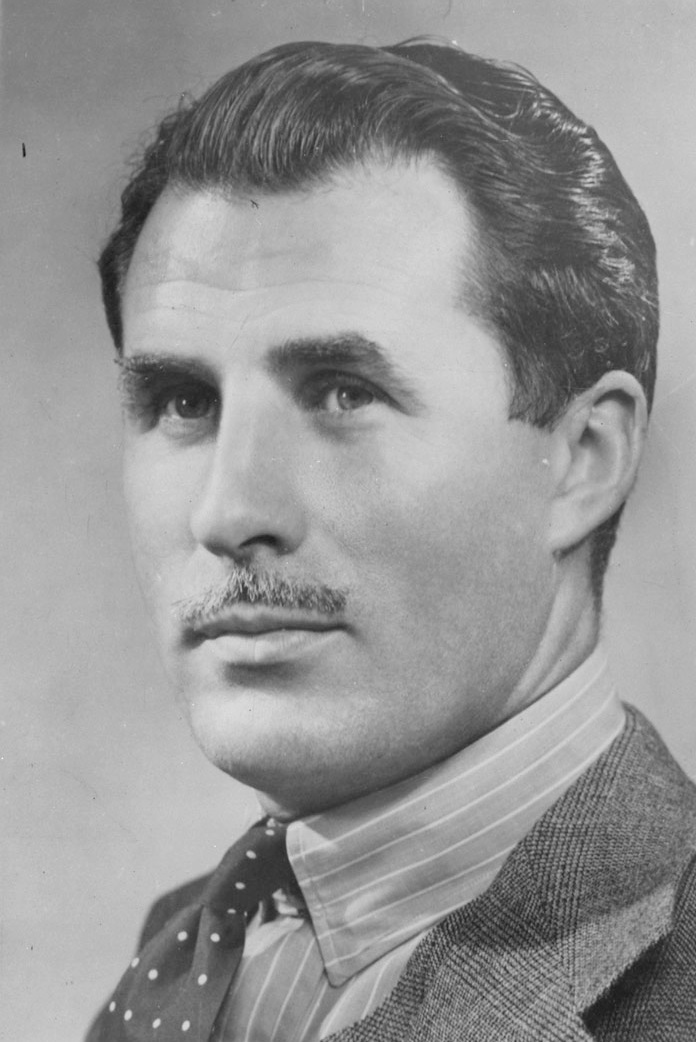
- Hees c. 1942–1948

Minister of Veterans Affairs
- In office September 17, 1984 – September 14, 1988
- Prime Minister: Brian Mulroney
- Preceded by: Bennett Campbell
- Succeeded by: Gerald Merrithew

Minister of Trade and Commerce
- In office October 11, 1960 – February 8, 1963
- Prime Minister: John Diefenbaker
- Preceded by: Gordon Churchill
- Succeeded by: Malcolm Wallace McCutcheon

Minister of Transport
- In office June 21, 1957 – October 10, 1960
- Prime Minister: John Diefenbaker
- Preceded by: George Carlyle Marler
- Succeeded by: Léon Balcer

Member of Parliament for Northumberland (Prince Edward—Hastings; 1968–1979)
- In office November 8, 1965 – November 21, 1988
- Preceded by: Pauline Jewett
- Succeeded by: Christine Stewart

Member of Parliament for Broadview
- In office May 15, 1950 – April 8, 1963
- Preceded by: Thomas Church
- Succeeded by: David Hahn

Personal details
- Born: George Harris Hees; June 17, 1910 Toronto, Ontario, Canada
- Died: June 11, 1996 (aged 85) Toronto, Ontario, Canada
- Party: Progressive Conservative
- Spouse: Mabel Dunlop (m. 1934; died 1993)
- Profession: Politician; soldier; businessman

George Hees
Profile
- Position: Center

Personal information
- Listed height: 6 ft 3 in (1.91 m)
- Listed weight: 200 lb (91 kg)

Career information
- College: University of Toronto & Royal Military College

Career history
- 1934, 1937–38: Toronto Argonauts

Awards and highlights
- Grey Cup champion (1938)

George Harris Hees PC OC (June 17, 1910 – June 11, 1996) was a Canadian politician and businessman.

== Background ==
Born in Toronto, Hees was educated at the exclusive Crescent School in Toronto, Trinity College School in Port Hope, Ontario, the Royal Military College, student #1976 (where he was awarded an honorary Doctor of Military Science in 1986), the University of Toronto, and spent a year at Cambridge University in 1933.

== Athlete ==
He was a noted athlete, winning championships in boxing and lacrosse at Cambridge. As a professional football player he was a star linebacker with the Toronto Argonauts team that won the 1938 Grey Cup. While serving during the Second World War, he played in the famed Tea Bowl for the Canadian Army football team against the American Army team at White City Stadium in London on February 13, 1944; the Canadians won 16-6.

== Military service ==
He attended The Royal Military College of Canada from 1927 to 1931. He then attended the University of Toronto and concurrently served for four years with The Royal Grenadiers, a Militia Regiment based in Toronto. He served in the Canadian Army in North-West Europe during the Second World War. During the Battle of the Scheldt, he served as the brigade major of the 5th Canadian Infantry Brigade. On 1 November 1944, he volunteered to take over command of a company of The Calgary Highlanders when all their officers were killed or wounded after crossing the Walcheren Causeway. He was wounded in the arm during the battle, evacuated, and repatriated to Canada where he was discharged from active service.

== Politics ==
After placing second to Liberal candidate David Croll in the Toronto riding of Spadina in the 1945 federal election, he won election to the House of Commons of Canada in a 1950 by-election in the nearby riding of Broadview. He was also President of the Progressive Conservative Party from 1953 to 1956. He considered running for the party leadership when George A. Drew was forced to step down in 1956, but instead supported the campaign of the eventual winner, John Diefenbaker.

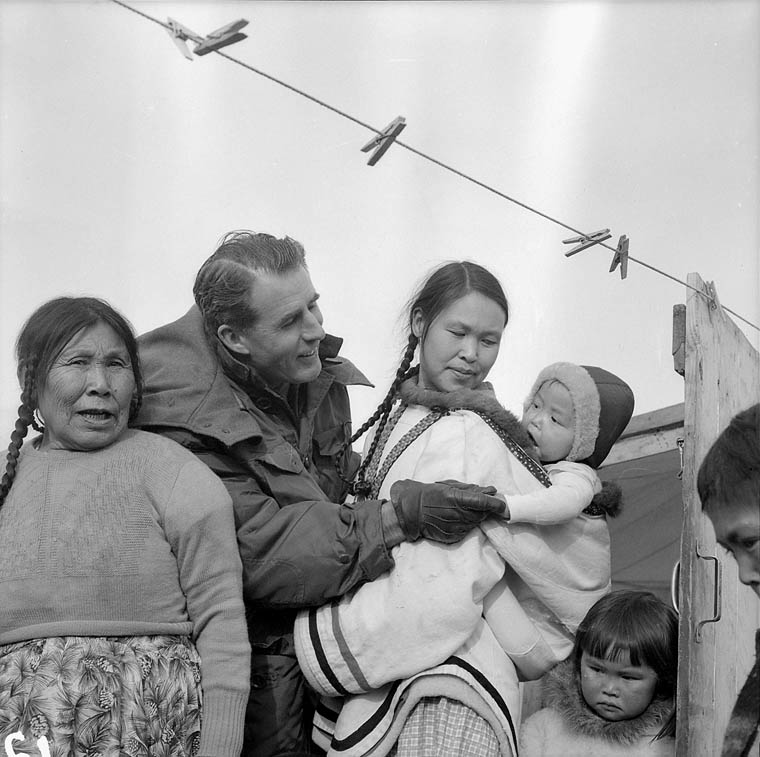
Hees visiting Inuit in Frobisher Bay, Northwest Territories, 1958.

When the PCs under Diefenbaker won government in 1957, Hees was named Minister of Transport, and oversaw the opening of the Saint Lawrence Seaway and the new Halifax International Airport. In 1960, he was appointed Minister of Trade and Commerce. During this period, Hees was regarded as the second most powerful man in the Tory party. However, in 1963, he fell out with Diefenbaker, and became embroiled in the Munsinger Affair and elected to sit out the 1963 election. In that election, the Liberals replaced the Tories' minority government with one of their own, causing Diefenbaker's succession with Lester B. Pearson as prime minister.

Hees considered leaving the Conservatives for the Liberals, but did not do so. He became president of the Montreal Stock Exchange. He returned to Parliament in the 1965 election as a PC, defeating Liberal MP Pauline Jewett in the rural riding of Northumberland, and remained in the front rows of the opposition ranks for almost two decades.

He ran for the leadership of the PC Party at its 1967 leadership convention, and placed fourth in a field of eleven on the first ballot. He remained for two further ballots before withdrawing, and supporting the eventual winner, Nova Scotia Premier Robert Stanfield.

He was noted for being involved in a 1972 election campaign incident. On 22 September 1972, Hees forcefully ejected campaign worker Douglas MacDonald from his motel room in Trenton, Nova Scotia. He struck MacDonald's head against the door, shattering some glass that lacerated him in several places. During the trial, Hees tried to plead self-defence. His plea failed and on 22 February 1974, the Nova Scotia Supreme Court ordered him to pay $6,175 to MacDonald.

He was not named to Cabinet during the Joe Clark government in 1979–80, and was quoted saying, as Clark stepped down in the 1983 leadership race, "We've got him! We've got the S.O.B."

In 1981, Hees was the Chairman of the Canada-US Permanent Joint Board on Defence. In this role, he was the first Canadian to bring to the attention of then-Prime Minister Pierre Trudeau the US request to test nuclear-capable cruise missiles over Canadian territory.

When Brian Mulroney led the party to a majority government in 1984, Hees was named Minister of Veterans Affairs. Hees retired from politics at the 1988 Canadian federal election. In 1989 he was made an Officer of the Order of Canada.

There is a veterans wing at Toronto's Sunnybrook Health Sciences Centre bearing his name, and near the relocated Crescent School he attended as a child.

== Election results (partial) ==
1958 Canadian federal election: Broadview
| Party | Candidate | Votes |
|---|---|---|
| Progressive Conservative | George Hees | 15,364 |
| Liberal | George A. Taylor | 4,738 |
| Co-operative Commonwealth | John Alan Lee | 3,356 |
| Socialist | Ross Dowson | 447 |

== In popular culture ==
Hees was portrayed by Christopher Plummer in the 1997 TV miniseries The Arrow.
