= Joseph Keeler =

Canadian politician

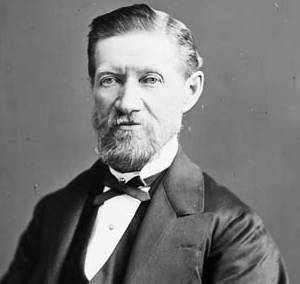

Member of the Canadian Parliament for Northumberland East
- In office February 20, 1867 – January 21, 1874
- Preceded by: District Created
- Succeeded by: James Lyons Biggar

Member of the Canadian Parliament for Northumberland East
- In office September 17, 1878 – January 21, 1881
- Preceded by: James Lyons Biggar
- Succeeded by: Darius Crouter

Personal details
- Born: May 24, 1824 Cramahe Township, Upper Canada
- Died: January 21, 1881 (aged 56)
- Party: Conservative
- Occupation: lumber merchant, landlord, grain merchant, postmaster, shipowner

Joseph Keeler (May 24, 1824 – January 21, 1881) was an Ontario businessman and political figure. He represented Northumberland East in the House of Commons of Canada as a Liberal-Conservative member from 1867 to 1874 and from 1879 to 1881.

He was born in Cramahe Township, Upper Canada in 1814 and educated at Upper Canada College. Keeler was a grain and lumber merchant and also owned a wharf, warehouses and a flour mill at Colborne. He was also the owner of a schooner. He was postmaster there and also served as a major in the local militia. Keeler operated a printing business which produced one of the first newspapers in the region, the Colborne Transcript. He helped establish a branch of the Bank of Toronto at Colborne and also helped promote the development of the Trent-Severn Waterway. In April 1879, Keeler introduced a bill to parliament to abolish the Supreme Court of Canada and the Exchequer Court, the bill did not succeed, but demonstrated the rural animosity towards the growing lawyer-centered character of Canada. After Keeler's death, the cause of abolishing the Supreme Court in Parliament was taken up by Auguste Charles Philippe Robert Landry.

On October 12, 1848, he married Octavia Phillips. Keeler died in office in Ottawa at the age of 56.

His father, Joseph Abbott Keeler, was credited with being the founder of Colborne and his grandfather, a United Empire Loyalist from Vermont also named Joseph Keeler, was one of the first settlers in the township.

== Election results ==
1867 Canadian federal election: East Riding of Northumberland
| Party | Candidate | Votes | % |
|---|---|---|---|
| Liberal–Conservative | Joseph Keeler | 1,607 | 66.02 |
| Unknown | Kenneth McKenzie | 827 | 33.98 |
| Unknown | Mr. Meyers | 0 | 0.00 |
| Total valid votes | | 2,434 | 72.66 |
| Eligible voters | | 3,350 | |
Source: 1867 Return of the Elections to House of Commons

1872 Canadian federal election: East Riding of Northumberland
| Party | Candidate | Votes |
|---|---|---|
| Liberal–Conservative | Joseph Keeler | 1,497 |
| Independent Liberal | James Lyons Biggar | 1,430 |
Source: Canadian Elections Database

1874 Canadian federal election: East Riding of Northumberland
| Party | Candidate | Votes |
|---|---|---|
| Independent Liberal | James Lyons Biggar | 1,662 |
| Liberal–Conservative | Joseph Keeler | 1,497 |
