= Charles Lewis Owen =

Canadian politician

Charles Lewis Owen (July 15, 1852 – September 20, 1926) was an American-born manufacturer and political figure in Ontario, Canada. He represented Northumberland East in the House of Commons of Canada from 1907 to 1911 as a Conservative.

He was born in Oriskany, New York, the son of Welsh immigrants. In 1875, Owen married Mary Eliza Bain. Owen had been a manufacturer of woollens. He served as reeve and county warden, and was mayor of Campbellford in 1912. Owen also served as chairman of the board of education and president of the public library board. Owen was first elected to the House of Commons in a 1907 by-election held following the death of Edward Cochrane. He was reelected in 1908. Owen died in Campbellford at the age of 74.

By-election: On Mr. Cochrane's death, 29 October 1907: East Riding of Northumberland
Party	Candidate	Votes
Conservative	C. L. Owen	2,347
Liberal	A. A. Mulholland	2,105

1908 Canadian federal election: East Riding of Northumberland
Party	Candidate	Votes
Conservative	Charles Lewis Owen	2,448
Liberal	Frank Leslie Webb	2,252
