= Albert Mallory =

Canadian politician (1848–1904)

Albert Elhanon Mallory (February 1, 1848 – October 4, 1904) was a Canadian physician and political figure in Ontario, Canada. He represented Northumberland East in the House of Commons of Canada in 1887 as a Liberal member.

He was born in Cobourg, Canada West, the son of Caleb R. Mallory, an unsuccessful candidate for a seat in the Legislative Assembly for the Province of Canada. Mallory was educated at Albert College and McGill University, receiving a M.D. from the latter institution in 1872, and set up practice in Warkworth. He was licensed by the Royal College of Physicians and Surgeons in Edinburgh in 1878. In 1880, he married Frances Waddell. After being elected in the 1887 federal election, Mallory was unseated on petition in November of that year and was defeated in the by-elections that followed in December 1887 and November 1888 by Edward Cochrane. In 1889, he was named registrar for Northumberland East. Mallory died in Colborne at the age of 56.

1887 Canadian federal election: East Riding of Northumberland
Party	Candidate	Votes
Liberal	Albert Elhanon Mallory	2,291
Conservative	Edward Cochrane	2,278

By-election: On Mr. Mallory being unseated for bribery by agents, 22 December 1887: East Riding of Northumberland
Party	Candidate	Votes
Conservative	Edward Cochrane	2,148
Liberal	Albert E. Mallory	2,124

By-election: On election being declared void, 21 November 1888: East Riding of Northumberland
Party	Candidate	Votes
Conservative	Edward Cochrane	2,074
Liberal	Albert E. Mallory	2,028
