= John Collard Field =

Canadian politician

Ontario MPP
- In office 1879–1883
- Preceded by: William Hargraft
- Succeeded by: Robert Mulholland
- Constituency: Northumberland West

Personal details
- Born: September 18, 1822 Wiveliscombe, Somerset, England
- Died: February 19, 1903 (aged 80) Cobourg, Ontario
- Party: Liberal
- Relations: Corelli Collard Field, brother
- Occupation: Businessman

John Collard Field (1822–1903) was an Ontario political figure. He represented Northumberland West in the Legislative Assembly of Ontario from 1879 to 1883 as a Liberal member.

He was born in Wiveliscombe, Somerset, England, the son of John Field, and came to Cobourg, Upper Canada with his parents in 1834. In 1844, he married Thirsa Pearse. He served as a member of the town council for Cobourg. Field operated a general store in Cobourg with his younger brother, Corelli Collard, who also represented Northumberland West in the provincial assembly and later became mayor of Cobourg.

His sister Myra Jane married William Kerr, who represented Northumberland West in the federal parliament. He died in 1903.

== Electoral history ==
1879 Ontario general election: Northumberland West
Party	Candidate	Votes	%	±%
Liberal	John Collard Field	1,333	50.40	−2.19
Conservative	G. Guillet	1,312	49.60	+2.19
Total valid votes		2,645	65.54	−5.25
Eligible voters		4,036		
Liberal hold		Swing		−2.19
Source: Elections Ontario
