= Northumberland East =

Former federal electoral district in Ontario, Canada

Ontario electoral district

Defunct federal electoral district
- Legislature: House of Commons
- District created: 1867
- District abolished: 1914
- First contested: 1867
- Last contested: 1911

Northumberland East was a federal electoral district represented in the House of Commons of Canada from 1867 to 1917. It was located in the province of Ontario. It was created by the British North America Act 1867.

The original definition of the riding is not known. In 1882, the East Riding of the county of Northumberland was defined to consist of the townships of Cramahe, Brighton, Murray, Percy and Seymour, the villages of Colborne, Brighton, Campbellford, and Hastings.

The electoral district was abolished in 1914 when it was merged into Northumberland riding.

== Members of Parliament ==
This riding has elected the following members of Parliament:

Parliament	Years	Member	Party
1st	1867–1872	Joseph Keeler	Liberal–Conservative
2nd	1872–1874	Joseph Keeler	Liberal–Conservative
3rd	1874–1874	James Lyons Biggar	Independent Liberal
3rd	1874–1878	James Lyons Biggar	Independent Liberal
4th	1878–1881	Joseph Keeler	Liberal–Conservative
4th	1881–1882	Darius Crouter	Independent Liberal
5th	1882–1887	Edward Cochrane	Conservative
6th	1887–1887	Albert Mallory	Liberal
6th	1887–1888	Edward Cochrane	Conservative
6th	1888–1891	Edward Cochrane	Conservative
7th	1891–1896	Edward Cochrane	Conservative
8th	1896–1900	Edward Cochrane	Conservative
9th	1900–1904	Edward Cochrane	Conservative
10th	1904–1907	Edward Cochrane	Conservative
10th	1907–1908	Charles Lewis Owen	Conservative
11th	1908–1911	Charles Lewis Owen	Conservative
12th	1911–1917	Henry Joseph Walker	Conservative
Riding dissolved into Northumberland

== Election history ==
1867 Canadian federal election
Party	Candidate	Votes	%
Liberal–Conservative	Joseph Keeler	1,607	66.02
Unknown	Kenneth McKenzie	827	33.98
Unknown	Mr. Meyers	0	0.00
Total valid votes		2,434	72.66
Eligible voters		3,350	
Source: 1867 Return of the Elections to House of Commons

1872 Canadian federal election
Party	Candidate	Votes
Liberal–Conservative	Joseph Keeler	1,497
Independent Liberal	James Lyons Biggar	1,430
Source: Canadian Elections Database

1874 Canadian federal election
Party	Candidate	Votes
Independent Liberal	James Lyons Biggar	1,662
Liberal–Conservative	Joseph Keeler	1,497

By-election: On Mr. Biggar being unseated on petition, 12 December 1874: East Riding of Northumberland
Party	Candidate	Votes
Independent Liberal	James Lyons Biggar	1,670
Conservative	James Cockburn	1,385

1878 Canadian federal election
Party	Candidate	Votes
Liberal–Conservative	Joseph Keeler	1,799
Independent Liberal	James Lyons Biggar	1,736

By-election: On Mr. Keeler's death, 21 January 1881: East Riding of Northumberland
Party	Candidate	Votes
Independent Liberal	Darius Crouter	acclaimed

1882 Canadian federal election
Party	Candidate	Votes
Conservative	Edward Cochrane	2,073
Independent Liberal	Darius Crouter	1,800

1887 Canadian federal election
Party	Candidate	Votes
Liberal	Albert Elhanon Mallory	2,291
Conservative	Edward Cochrane	2,278

By-election: On Mr. Mallory being unseated for bribery by agents, 22 December 1887: East Riding of Northumberland
Party	Candidate	Votes
Conservative	Edward Cochrane	2,148
Liberal	Albert E. Mallory	2,124

By-election: On election being declared void, 21 November 1888: East Riding of Northumberland
Party	Candidate	Votes
Conservative	Edward Cochrane	2,074
Liberal	Albert E. Mallory	2,028

1891 Canadian federal election
Party	Candidate	Votes
Conservative	E. Cochrane	2,495
Liberal	M. P. Ketchum	2,259

1896 Canadian federal election
Party	Candidate	Votes
Conservative	E. Cochrane	2,410
Patrons of Industry	C. A. Mallory	2,013

1900 Canadian federal election
Party	Candidate	Votes
Conservative	Edward Cochrane	2,452
Liberal	Robert Baldwin Denike	2,086

1904 Canadian federal election
Party	Candidate	Votes
Conservative	Edward Cochrane	2,402
Liberal	John H. Douglas	2,196

By-election: On Mr. Cochrane's death, 29 October 1907: East Riding of Northumberland
Party	Candidate	Votes
Conservative	C. L. Owen	2,347
Liberal	A. A. Mulholland	2,105

1908 Canadian federal election
Party	Candidate	Votes
Conservative	Charles Lewis Owen	2,448
Liberal	Frank Leslie Webb	2,252

1911 Canadian federal election
Party	Candidate	Votes
Conservative	Henry Joseph Walker	2,518
Liberal	Alexander Weatherson	2,127

== See also ==
- List of Canadian electoral districts
- Historical federal electoral districts of Canada
