= Alexander Fraser (Ontario politician) =

Canadian politician

Ontario MPP
- In office 1867–1871
- Preceded by: Riding established
- Succeeded by: Charles Gifford
- Constituency: Northumberland West

Personal details
- Born: August 24, 1824 Inverness, Scotland
- Died: October 23, 1883 (aged 59) Cobourg, Ontario
- Party: Liberal
- Spouse: Mary Mead Torrance (m. 1850)
- Occupation: Businessman

Alexander Fraser (August 24, 1824 – October 23, 1883) was an Ontario businessman and political figure. He represented Northumberland West in the Legislative Assembly of Ontario from 1867 to 1871.

He was born in Inverness, Scotland in 1824 and was educated at the King's College, University of Aberdeen. He was a woollen manufacturer. He was also a director of the Cobourg, Peterborough and Marmora Railway.

== Electoral history ==
1867 Ontario general election: Northumberland West
Party	Candidate	Votes
Liberal	Alexander Fraser	Acclaimed
Source: Elections Ontario

1871 Ontario general election: Northumberland West
Party	Candidate	Votes	%
Liberal	Alexander Fraser	1,013	50.90
Conservative	Charles Gifford	977	49.10
Turnout		1,990	67.48
Eligible voters		2,949	
Liberal hold			
Source: Elections Ontario
