= Mount Radford School =

Coordinates: 50.7187°N 3.522°W

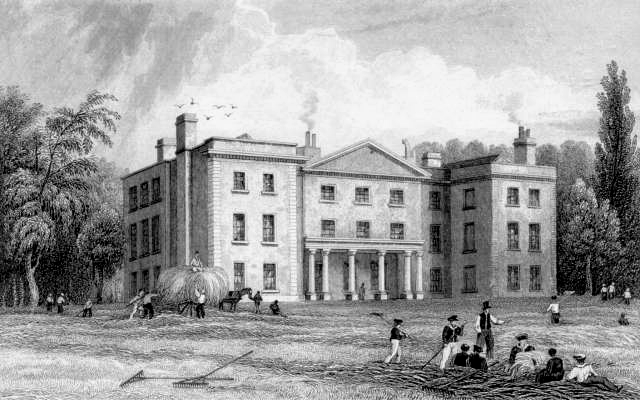
- Mount Radford House, home of the first Mount Radford School
- The later Mount Radford School, established 1875 was located at Park House, 56 St Leonards Road; Exeter, Devon, EX2 6EU; England

Information
- Type: Private day and boarding school
- Established: 26 March 1827
- Closed: July 1967
- Gender: Boys
- Enrollment: 300 +
- Former pupils: Old Radfordians

Mount Radford School was a private day and boarding school for boys in Exeter, Devon, England. It was also historically known as Mount Radford College, and was sometimes referred to as The Exeter Public School. This is not to be confused with Exeter School, which has no connection to this school.

== History ==
The school was founded on the historic estate of Mount Radford, Exeter on 26 March 1827. Boys entered into the school and if successful at examinations by the age of 16 passed into the College part of the school. The school occupied Mount Radford House and later extensive buildings in the grounds when the headmaster, Rev Henry Rodwell Roper owned the house and lived in it. After his death his son in law, Rev John Ingle took over and he was deep in debt having purchased an estate in Devon and the school went into decline. The school closed in 1873-74. The house and estate were sold to a private buyer under the terms of the will of Rev Roper after his daughter's death. The house remained in private hands until 1902 when it was demolished and houses built on the land. However, there is a part of the old estate still at the bottom of St Leonards Road, known as Mount Radford Lawns.

In 1868 Edwin Henry Vine founded a school in his home town in Blandford Forum, Dorset, which was very successful. In 1875 he moved to St Leonards in Exeter and founded Mount Radford School in April that year at Nos 1-2 The Quadrant and later due to the school's success moved to Nos 4 -6 The Quadrant. In 1895 the school moved to Park House, 56 St Leonards Road, Exeter. Why he moved to Exeter from Blandford is unknown, and none of the boys from that school or the masters, with the exception of a Mr W Tweedy, moved to the new Mount Radford School, which had no connection to the old school. The school was sometimes referred to as The Vines School on account that the Vine family provided three of the school's headmasters.

Mr W. E. Vine, the eldest son of the founder, first joined his father at the school, at the age of seventeen. He succeeded his father as headmaster in 1901, and held office until 1916 when he was invited to become the director of the Missionary Society in Bath. W. E. Vine was followed by his younger brother, T. E. Vine, who continued as head until his retirement in 1957. The school averaged 200 pupils until the end of World War II. For much of his career as headmaster, T. E. Vine was assisted by two loyal lieutenants, Messrs S. B. Angwin and W. A. "Buster" Wheatley.

In 1957 T E Vine sold the school and Park House to a Mr A Greenaway. he then closed the school in July 1967 and Park House was sold to St Lukes College for student accommodation. The rest of the grounds and buildings behind the house were sold to a developer for housing. Park House is today a Dementia care Home and there is a plaque on the outside commemorating Mount Radford School, and the headmasters.

== Notable former pupils and staff ==
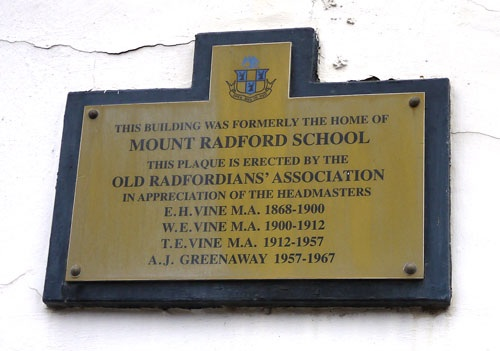
Mount Radford Headmasters

=== Former staff members ===
- Henry Acton (1797–1843), tutor, English Unitarian minister and author
- Edward Burrow (1785–1861), principal, English divine and miscellaneous writer.
- William Gilbert Rees (1827–1898), tutor, British explorer, surveyor, and settler

=== Old Radfordians of the original Mount Radford School ===
- John Hughes Bennett (1812–1875), English physician, physiologist and pathologist
- Herbert Mills Birdwood (1837–1907), Anglo-Indian judge and administrator
- Lewin Bentham Bowring (1824–1910), British Indian civil servant
- Charles Cornwallis Chesney (1826–1876), British soldier and military writer
- Nicholas Matthews Condy (1818–1851), British maritime painter.
- Henry Pering Pellew Crease (1823–1905) British-Canadian lawyer, judge, and politician
- Charles Gifford (1821–1896), Ontario political figure
- Walter Kennaway (1835–1920), provincial politician, farmer and run-holder
- Joseph Trutch (1826–1904), Canadian civil engineer, land surveyor, and politician
- George Nugent Tyrrell (1816–1893), English railway pioneer

=== Old Radfordians of the later Mount Radford School ===
- Tommy Cooper (1921–1984), Welsh prop comedian and magician
- David Harris (born 1937), British former Conservative Party politician
- R. J. Hopper (1910–1987), British archaeologist and classicist
- Christopher Parsons (1932–2002), English wildlife film-maker
- Ernest Petter (1873–1954), English industrialist and politician
- David Morrison Reid Henry (1919–1977), British illustrator of birds
- John Joseph Saunders (1910–1972), British historian

The Old Radfordians Association was founded in 1928 and as of 2024 has around 80 members. It is run by a small committee and an Annual General Meeting and Luncheon is held each April in Exeter.
