= Pauline Jewett =

Canadian politician (1922–1992)

The Honourable Pauline Jewett PC OC
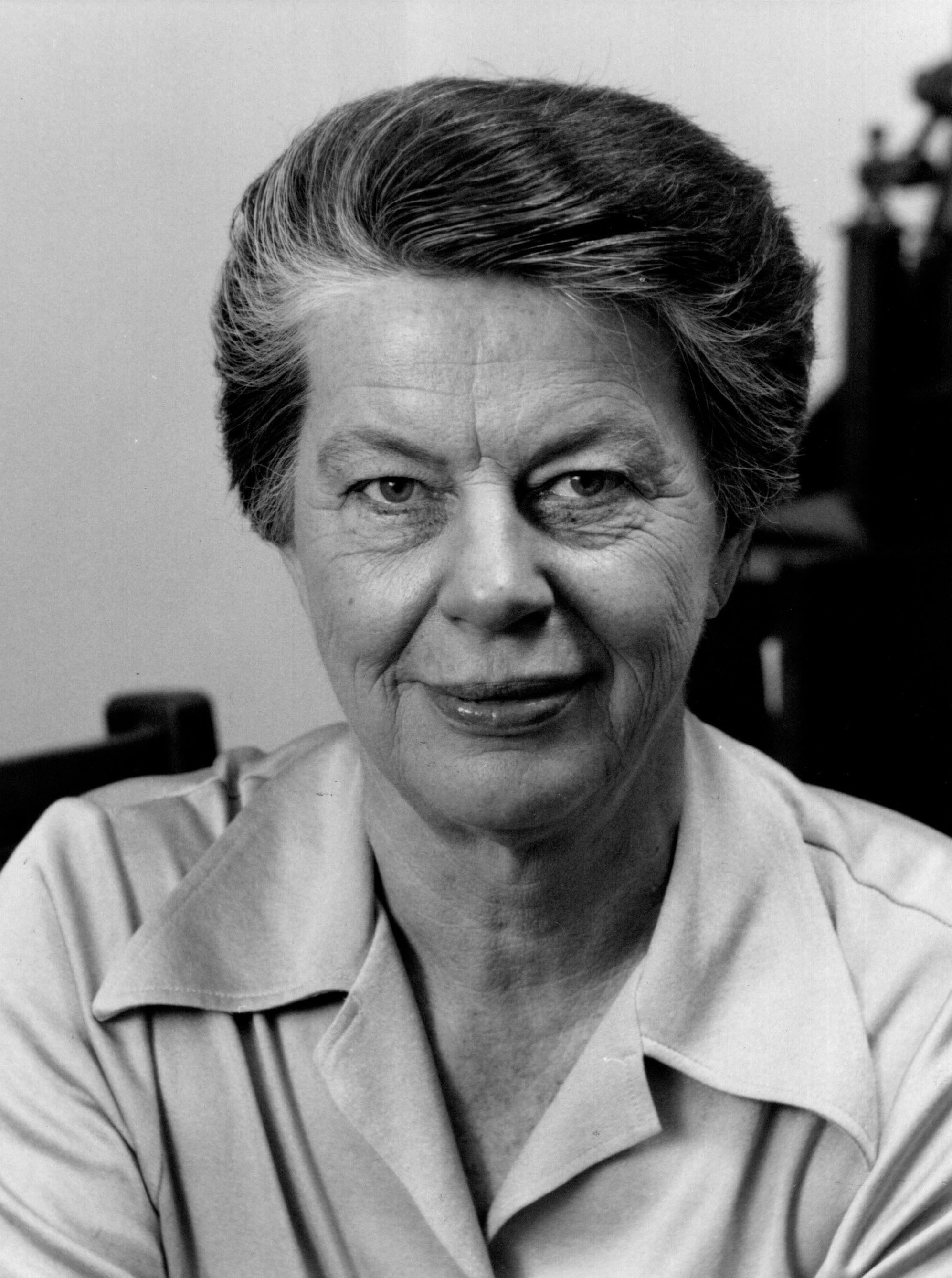

Member of Parliament for New Westminster—Coquitlam
- In office 22 May 1979 – 20 November 1988
- Preceded by: Riding created
- Succeeded by: Riding dissolved

Member of Parliament for Northumberland
- In office 8 April 1963 – 7 November 1965
- Preceded by: Harry Oliver Bradley
- Succeeded by: George Hees

Personal details
- Born: 11 December 1922 St. Catharines, Ontario, Canada
- Died: 5 July 1992 (aged 69)
- Party: Liberal (until 1970); New Democratic (after 1970)
- Profession: Professor; administrator

Pauline Jewett PC OC (11 December 1922 – 5 July 1992) was a Canadian academic and politician. In her political career, she served in the House of Commons of Canada for the Liberal Party and later the New Democratic Party.

== Life and career ==
Jewett was born in St. Catharines, Ontario, where she attended elementary and secondary school. She was the daughter of Mrs. F.C. Jewett, a descendant of Northumberland, Ontario. In 1944, she received a BA in politics and philosophy. In the following year, she received an MA from Queen's University. She obtained a Ph.D in political science at Radcliffe College, Harvard University in 1949. She continued her studies at the London School of Economics and Oxford University.

Jewett went on to lecture at Wellesley College, Queen's University and Carleton University. At Carleton, she was the chairman of the department of political science from 1960 to 1961 and served as Director of the Institute of Canadian Studies from 1967 to 1972.

In 1961, Jewett became a resident of Brighton, Ontario, in the constituency of Northumberland. In the 1962 federal election, she ran as the Liberal candidate in Northumberland. She lost by 758 votes to the Progressive Conservative (PC) candidate, Harry Bradley. In a rematch against Bradley in the 1963 election, she won by 505 votes, making her a Member of Parliament for the first time. In the 1965 election, she lost to her PC challenger, former MP George Hees, by 563 votes.

After Liberal Prime Minister Pierre Trudeau invoked the War Measures Act during the October Crisis, Jewett quit the Liberal Party and joined the New Democratic Party. She ran as an NDP candidate in the 1972 election in the riding of Ottawa West, but came in third, losing to Progressive Conservative candidate Peter Reilly.

In May 1974, Jewett moved to British Columbia to become president of Simon Fraser University. She was the first woman president of a Canadian co-educational university.

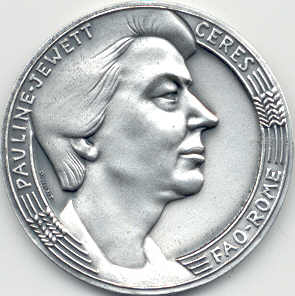
FAO CERES Medal - Silver Obverse

She was honoured with the FAO CERES Medal in 1976.

In the 1979 election, she was elected in the riding of New Westminster—Coquitlam as the NDP candidate. She was also re-elected in the 1980 and 1984 elections. She did not seek re-election in 1988.

In 1991, she was made an Officer of the Order of Canada, and in 1992, she was appointed to the Privy Council.

Jewett was Chancellor of Carleton University from 1990 until her death from cancer in 1992.

== Academic awards ==
- Medal in politics at Queen's University
- Arts Resident Research Fellowship at Queen's University
- Henry Clay Jackson Fellowship at Radcliffe College, Harvard University
- Marty Memorial Scholarship
- Nuffield Foundation Travel Grants

== Memberships ==
- Consumers' Association of Canada
- Canadian Political Science Association
- Canadian Institute of International Affairs
- Institute of Public Administration of Canada
- President of the Parliamentary Group of World Federalists

== Projects in allied fields ==
- Part-author of Canadian Economic Policy (published in 1961)
- Wrote articles on governmental and political issues
- Participated on radio and television broadcasts dealing with public affairs
- Author of the study for Canadian Nurses' Association dealing with the structure of the group

Academic offices
Preceded by Kenneth Strand	President and Vice-chancellor of Simon Fraser University; 1974–1978	Succeeded by K. George Pedersen
Preceded by Robert Gordon Robertson	Chancellor of Carleton University; 1990–1992	Succeeded by Arthur Kroeger
