= Charles Cornwallis Chesney =

British soldier and military writer

- Born: 29 September 1826; Packolet, near Kilkeel, County Down, Ireland
- Died: 19 March 1876 (aged 49); London, England
- Burial place: St. Michael‘s Churchyard, Camberley, Surrey Heath Borough, Surrey, England
- Education: Royal Military Academy; Blundell's School; Mount Radford School
- Spouse: Alice Wilby Barr (m. 1853)
- Children: 1
- Relatives: Matilda Marian Pullan (sister); Francis Rawdon Chesney (brother); George Tomkyns Chesney (brother); Francis Rawdon Chesney (uncle)
- Military career
- Allegiance: United Kingdom
- Branch: Board of Ordnance; British Army
- Service years: 1845–1876
- Rank: Lieutenant Colonel and Brevet Colonel
- Service number: 756
- Unit: Corps of Royal Engineers
- Commands: CRE, Home District, 1875–1876
- Memorials: Royal Memorial Chapel, Royal Military Academy Sandhurst

Charles Cornwallis Chesney (29 September 1826 – 19 March 1876) was a British military engineer and writer.

== Family background and education ==
Chesney was an Ulster-Scot born at Packolet, near Kilkeel, County Down, Ireland, the third son of Charles Cornwallis Chesney, captain on the retired list of the Bengal Artillery, and Sophia Augusta Cauty. His uncle was General Francis Rawdon Chesney, RE, his younger brother was General George Tomkyns Chesney, RE, and his older sister was the writer Matilda Marian Pullan.

He was educated at Mount Radford School in Exeter, Blundell's School in Tiverton, and afterwards at the Royal Military Academy, Woolwich, he obtained his first commission as second lieutenant of engineers in 1845, passing out of the academy at the head of his term.

== Career ==
Chesney's early military service was spent in the ordinary course of regimental duty at home and abroad, assigned to Bermuda from November 1847 to May 1850, the West Indies from May 1850 to July 1853 and New Zealand from February 1854 to April 1856 during the Crimean War. Among the various reforms in the British military system which followed from that war was the impetus given to military education; and in 1858 Captain Chesney was appointed professor of military history at the Royal Military College, Sandhurst.

In 1864, he succeeded Colonel (afterwards Sir) Edward Bruce Hamley in the corresponding chair at the Staff College. The writings of these two brilliant officers had a great influence not only at home, but on Continental Europe and the United States. Chesney's first published work (1863) was an account of the American Civil War in Virginia, which went through several editions. But the work which attained the greatest reputation was his Waterloo Lectures (1868), prepared from the notes of lectures orally delivered at the Staff College.

Up to that time the English literature on the Waterloo campaign, although voluminous, was made up of personal reminiscences or of formal records, useful materials for history rather than history itself; and the French accounts had mainly taken the form of fiction. In Chesney's lucid and vigorous account of the momentous struggle, while it illustrates both the strategy and tactics which culminated in the final catastrophe, the mistakes committed by Napoleon I of France are laid bare, and for the first time an English writer is found to point out that the dispositions of Arthur Wellesley, 1st Duke of Wellington were far from faultless. And in the Waterloo Lectures the Prussians are for the first time credited by an English pen with their proper share in the victory. The work attracted much attention abroad as well as at home, and French and German translations were published.

Chesney was for many years a constant contributor to the newspaper press and to periodic literature, devoting himself for the most part to the critical treatment of military operations, and professional subjects generally. Some of his essays on military biography, contributed mainly to the Edinburgh Review, were afterwards published separately in 1874. In 1868 he was appointed a member of the Royal Commission on Military Education, under the presidency first of Earl de Grey and afterwards of Frederick Hamilton-Temple-Blackwood, 1st Marquess of Dufferin and Ava, to whose recommendations were due the improved organization of the military colleges, and the development of military education in the principal military stations of the British army.

In 1871, on the conclusion of the Franco-Prussian War, he was sent on a special mission to the French Third Republic and the German Empire, and furnished to the government a series of valuable reports on the different siege operations which had been carried out during the war, especially the two sieges of Paris. These reports were published in a large volume, which was issued confidentially.

He was appointed lieutenant-colonel in 1873, and at the time of his death he was Commanding Royal Engineer of the London district.

== Death and burial ==
Chesney was abstemious and, overwork of mind and body telling at last on a frail constitution, he died on 19 March 1876 at Victoria St, London, following a short illness. He was buried at Sandhurst.

== Assessment ==
Colonel Chesney never sought or received standard promotions, yet he held a uniquely respected status in the army at the time of his death. Officers of all ranks regularly sought his professional advice, and he significantly elevated the intellectual standards of the British officer corps. While deeply committed to his writing, he remained dedicated and disciplined in his military duties, while also devoting much of his personal time to charity and ministry.

== Publications ==
- Chesney, Charles Cornwallis (1875). "The Military Future of Germany". Macmillan's Magazine. Vol. 32, no. 191, September. pp. 471–480.
- Chesney, Charles Cornwallis (1874). Essays in Modern Military Biography. London: Longmans, Green, and Co.
- Chesney, Charles Cornwallis (1874). Waterloo Lectures: A Study of the Campaign of 1815. London: Longmans, Green, and Co.
- Chesney, Charles Cornwallis; Reeve, Henry (1870). The Military Resources of Prussia and France and Recent Changes in the Art of War. London: Longmans, Green, and Co.
- Chesney, Charles Cornwallis (1868). The Tactical Use of Fortresses: A Farewell Lecture, Concluding a Course of Military History for Military Engineers. London: Byfield, Stanford & Co.
- Chesney, Charles Cornwallis (1865). Campaigns in Virginia, Maryland, etc, etc. Vol. 2. London: Smith, Elder and Co.
- Chesney, Charles Cornwallis (1863). A Military View of Campaigns in Virginia, Maryland. London: Smith, Elder and Co.
- Chesney, Charles Cornwallis (1860). "New Zealand Considered as a Field for the Emigration of Military Men". Journal of the Royal United Service Institution. 3 (11). London: W. Mitchell: 271–289.

== Sources ==
- Lane-Poole, Stanley (1887). "Chesney, Charles Cornwallis" . In Stephen, Leslie (ed.). Dictionary of National Biography. Vol. 10. London: Smith, Elder & Co.
- Lane-Poole, Stanley; Falkner, James. "Chesney, Charles Cornwallis (1826–1876)". Oxford Dictionary of National Biography (online ed.). Oxford University Press. doi:10.1093/ref:odnb/5229. (Subscription, Wikipedia Library access or UK public library membership required.)
