= Northumberland West =

Former federal electoral district in Ontario, Canada

Ontario electoral district

Defunct federal electoral district
- Legislature: House of Commons
- District created: 1867
- District abolished: 1914
- First contested: 1867
- Last contested: 1911

Northumberland West was a federal electoral district represented in the House of Commons of Canada from 1867 to 1917. It was located in the province of Ontario. It was created by the British North America Act 1867.

The original definition of the riding is not known. In 1903, it was defined to consist of the townships of Alnwick, Haldimand and Hamilton, and the town of Cobourg.

The electoral district was abolished in 1914 when it was merged into Northumberland riding.

== Members of Parliament ==
This riding has elected the following members of Parliament:

Parliament	Years	Member	Party
1st	1867–1872	James Cockburn	Conservative
2nd	1872–1874	James Cockburn	Conservative
3rd	1874–1874	William Kerr	Liberal
3rd	1874–1878	William Kerr	Liberal
4th	1878–1881	James Cockburn	Conservative
4th	1881–1882	George Guillet	Conservative
5th	1882–1885	George Guillet	Conservative
5th	1885–1887	George Guillet	Conservative
6th	1887–1891	George Guillet	Conservative
7th	1891–1892	John Hargraft	Liberal
7th	1892–1896	George Guillet	Conservative
8th	1896–1900	George Guillet	Conservative
9th	1900–1904	John B. McColl	Liberal
10th	1904–1908	John B. McColl	Liberal
11th	1908–1911	John B. McColl	Liberal
12th	1911–1917	Charles Arthur Munson	Conservative
Riding dissolved into Northumberland

== Election history ==
1867 Canadian federal election: West Riding of Northumberland
Party	Candidate	Votes
Conservative	James Cockburn	acclaimed

1872 Canadian federal election: West Riding of Northumberland
Party	Candidate	Votes
Conservative	James Cockburn	acclaimed

1874 Canadian federal election: West Riding of Northumberland
Party	Candidate	Votes
Liberal	William Kerr	1,336
Conservative	James Cockburn	1,105

By-election: On Mr. Kerr being unseated on petition, 17 November 1874: West Riding of Northumberland
Party	Candidate	Votes
Liberal	William Kerr	1,315
Unknown	Sidney Smith	1,160

1878 Canadian federal election: West Riding of Northumberland
Party	Candidate	Votes
Conservative	James Cockburn	1,315
Liberal	William Kerr	1,227

By-election: On Mr. Cockburn's resignation to become Chairman of the Commission to collect, examine and classify the Statutes passed by the Parliament of the Dominion of Canada, since Confederation, 19 December 1881: West Riding of Northumberland
Party	Candidate	Votes
Conservative	George Guillet	1,448
Unknown	George Waters	1,378

1882 Canadian federal election: West Riding of Northumberland
Party	Candidate	Votes
Conservative	George Guillet	1,298
Liberal	Wm. Kerr	1,293

By-election: On Mr. Guillet being unseated, 7 April 1885: West Riding of Northumberland
Party	Candidate	Votes
Conservative	George Guillet	acclaimed

1887 Canadian federal election: West Riding of Northumberland
Party	Candidate	Votes
Conservative	George Guillet	1,648
Liberal	J. H. Dumble	1,611

1891 Canadian federal election: West Riding of Northumberland
Party	Candidate	Votes
Liberal	John Hargraft	1,591
Conservative	George Guillet	1,554

By-election: On Election being declared void, 15 March 1892: West Riding of Northumberland
Party	Candidate	Votes
Conservative	George Guillet	
Liberal	John Hargraft	

1896 Canadian federal election: West Riding of Northumberland
Party	Candidate	Votes
Conservative	George Guillet	1,200
Liberal	John B. McColl	1,130
Patrons of Industry	John C. Rosevear	621

1900 Canadian federal election: West Riding of Northumberland
Party	Candidate	Votes
Liberal	John B. McColl	1,506
Conservative	George Guillet	1,371

1904 Canadian federal election: West Riding of Northumberland
Party	Candidate	Votes
Liberal	John B. McColl	1,501
Conservative	Eric Norman Armour	1,357

1908 Canadian federal election: West Riding of Northumberland
Party	Candidate	Votes
Liberal	John B. McColl	1,438
Conservative	Charles Arthur Munson	1,308

1911 Canadian federal election: West Riding of Northumberland
Party	Candidate	Votes
Conservative	Charles Arthur Munson	1,426
Liberal	John "B." McColl	1,420

== See also ==
- List of Canadian electoral districts
- Historical federal electoral districts of Canada
