= Matilda Marian Pullan =

British writer on needlework

- Born: Matilda Marian Chesney; 1819; Annalong, Ireland
- Died: 19 February 1862 (aged 42–43); United States
- Occupation: writer
- Spouse(s): Samuel Pullan (1845–1851); Thomas Smith Metcalfe (1855–1862)
- Children: 1
- Relatives: Francis Rawdon Chesney (uncle); Charles Cornwallis Chesney (brother); George Tomkyns Chesney (brother)
- Writing career
- Pen name: Aiguillette, Mrs. Pullan
- Language: English
- Subject: needlework
- Notable work: The Lady's Manual of Fancy-Work (1859)

Matilda Marian Pullan (1819–19 February 1862)—also writing under the pen names Mrs. Pullan and Aiguillette— was a 19th century British writer on needlework who contributed columns to a wide selection of periodicals in the 1840s and 1850s. She was the author of numerous books on needlework, especially the decorative forms known as fancywork, and she wrote a comprehensive encyclopedia on the subject. She was also a successful businesswoman who ran a needlework supply shop that expanded to become a mail order business. Towards the end of her life, she moved to America, where she opened a consulting business whose clients included the actor Laura Keene.

== Family ==
Matilda Marian Chesney was born in 1819 at Prospect House in Annalong, Ireland, one of six children of Sophia Augusta (Cauty) Chesney and Charles Cornwallis Chesney. Her father (who died when she was nine) was a lieutenant in the Bengal Artillery, and her uncle was General Francis Rawdon Chesney. Her brother Charles Cornwallis Chesney was a military writer and another brother, George Tomkyns Chesney, was a general.

Chesney spent a good deal of her youth in boarding schools, followed by employment as a governess. In 1845, she married a London coach maker, Samuel Pullan, a move that appears to have estranged her from her family. Her marriage ended with his death; she is listed as a widow as well as an "authoress and needlework designer" in the 1851 census.

In 1852, Chesney gave birth to a son whose father remains unknown.

Pullan married Thomas Smith Metcalfe in 1855; this second marriage was not happy. Since divorce was impractical, Pullan escaped the marriage by moving to the United States with her child in 1857, where she remained until her death from uterine cancer in 1862 at the age of 42.

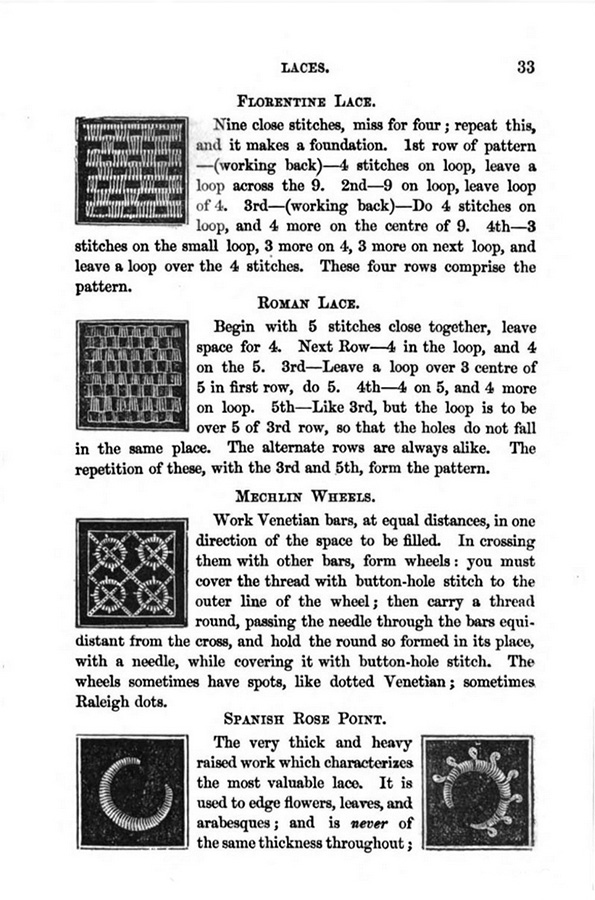
Page 33 of Matilda Marian Pullan, The Lady's Dictionary of Needlework, 1856.

== Writing career ==
=== England (1850–1857) ===
Pullan turned to the periodical press to earn a living, especially after she was widowed. She published articles about needlework with illustrations and detailed patterns, capitalizing on the skills she would have been taught as a girl to instruct other women about middle-class taste in clothing and home furnishings. The 1840s saw the rise of domestic instruction for young women as a new area of publishing, and Pullan had a hand in establishing or writing new columns on needlework at many women's magazines. In the end, she became "the most prolific contributor of fancywork patterns to the mid-nineteenth century press". Her success was due in part to her business skills and in part to her writing style, which was "informative, entertaining, and engaging without being polemical."

Pullan's earliest books on needlework were published under the title Lady's Library (1850). Written in epistolary style, the individual volumes focused on different forms of fancywork and other decorative methods, including knitting, crocheting, netting, braiding, embroidery, papier-mâché, and japanning. The series was discontinued after six volumes, but Pullan used this experience to establish herself as a writer for the periodical press.

Early columns Pullan wrote for included "Accomplishments for Young Women" in Home Circle (beginning 1850, under the pen name 'Aiguillette') and "Work" in Belle Assemblée (beginning 1851). In 1851, she took part in the Crystal Palace exhibition, showing point lace work to establish herself as an expert on fancywork.

In 1852, she became the editor of the fancywork department of the Ladies' Cabinet (into which Belle Assemblée and Ladies' Companion had recently merged). That same year, she also took over "The Work-Table Friend" column on fancywork patterns in Family Friend, expanding it into a supplement of 3–4 pages. Three years later, she and fellow needlework columnist Eliza Warren coauthored Treasures in Needlework, an illustrated reprint of their various columns for Family Friend that encompassed knitting, crocheting, tatting, point lace, netting, braiding, and embroidery.

In 1856, Pullan became the director of the fancywork department at Domestic Magazine. She also served for a time as editor of the London and Paris Ladies' Magazine of Fashion. She later contributed to "The Lady's Library" in Morning Chronicle and "The Work-Table" in Lady's Newspaper. Other periodicals she wrote for over the years included the London Review, Illustrated Magazine of Art, and Governess. Given the range of publications she worked on, it was hardly an exaggeration for her to write in the late 1850s that "there is not one Magazine, in which Fancy-work is a feature, that does not, with or without acknowledgement, avail itself of my labors."

Pullan was a successful businesswoman as well as writer, running a needlework patterns and supplies shop in London that did so well that she eventually opened a branch shop and a mail-order business. She taught classes at the shop and, as a canny form of advertising, invited her readers to stop by to discuss needlework with her in person.

=== America (1857–1862) ===
In 1857, Pullan emigrated to New York. She contributed to the "Work-Table"' column in Frank Leslie's Illustrated Newspaper, eventually rising to become editor of its entire fashion section. Other American periodicals she contributed to included the New York Leader, American Agriculturist, and Boys' and Girls' Own Magazine.

In America, Pullan was able to pursue a project of writing a comprehensive illustrated encyclopedia of fancywork. The Lady's Manual of Fancy-Work (1859) was wide-ranging, even encompassing patchwork, which was not usually included in needlework and fancywork books.

Pullan also established a fancywork consulting business in New York, helping women choose fabrics, threads, and other materials for their projects. One of her clients was the actor Laura Keene, and Pullan apparently even designed some of her costumes. During this period, Pullan became a champion of the newly popular sewing machine, seeing it as the "liberator of our sex" from the "drudgery of ... plain needlework."

During Pullan's final illness, Miriam Squier—then a member of the Frank Leslie's Illustrated Newspaper staff and later a publisher in her own right—covered her columns but gave the pay for this work to the ailing Pullan.

== Publications ==
- Chesney, Matilda Marian (1844). The Court-partial, of 18–. A Tale of Military Life. London: T. C. Newby. (published anonymously)
- Practical Grammar (1847)
- Lady's Library (1850, series of six books)
- Book of Riddles (1851)
- The Modern Housewife's Receipt Book: A Guide to All Matters Connected with Household Economy (1854)
- Maternal Counsels to a Daughter (1854)
- The Ladies' Book of Fancy Work (1854–55, series of 8 books)
- Treasures in Needlework (1855, with Eliza Warren)
- The Lady's Dictionary of Needlework (1856)
- Manual of the Wardrobe (1858)
- The Lady's Manual of Fancy-Work: A Complete Instruction in Every Variety of Ornamental Needle-work (1859)
