= John Hargraft =

Canadian politician

John Hargraft (February 26, 1865 – July 10, 1918) was an Ontario merchant and political figure. He represented Northumberland West in the House of Commons of Canada in 1891 as a Liberal member.

He was born in Cobourg, Canada West in 1865, the son of William Hargraft. He was educated in Cobourg and at Trinity College School in Port Hope. In 1888, he married Anna Eva Boyes. Hargraft was a grain and coal merchant. He was elected to the House of Commons in 1891; his election was declared invalid after an appeal and he was defeated by George Guillet in the by-election that followed in 1892.
