= Charles Gifford (Canadian politician) =

Canadian politician (1821–1896)

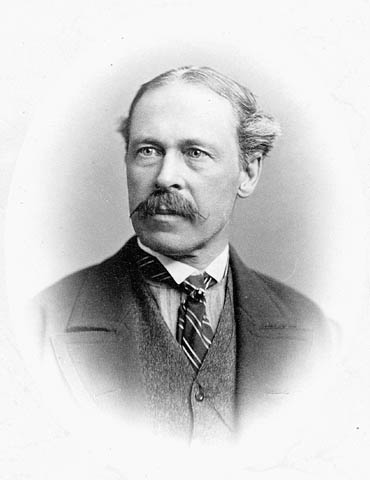

Ontario MPP
- In office 1872–1874
- Preceded by: Alexander Fraser
- Succeeded by: William Hargraft
- Constituency: Northumberland West

Personal details
- Born: February 24, 1821 Exmouth, Devon, England
- Died: April 20, 1896 (aged 75) Northumberland County, Ontario
- Party: Conservative
- Spouse: Frances Elizabeth Fuller (m. 1855)
- Education: Mount Radford School
- Occupation: Lawyer

Charles Gifford (February 24, 1821 – 20 April 1896) was an Ontario political figure. He represented Northumberland West in the Legislative Assembly of Ontario as a Conservative member from 1872 to 1874.

Gifford was born in Exmouth, Devon, England in 1821. He was educated at Mount Radford School in Exeter, University College School in London and the University of London. He studied law and was called to the English bar in 1846. He served as captain in the local militia, later becoming colonel. He was elected to the provincial legislature in a by-election called in 1872 after the resignation of Alexander Fraser, the sitting member. He was defeated in the general election held in 1875. That same year, Gifford sponsored the building of a sailing ship built in Cobourg, the Countess of Dufferin, that raced in the America's Cup in 1876.

He died at Hamilton Township, Northumberland in 1896.

== Electoral history ==
Ontario provincial by-election, January 1872: Northumberland West Resignation of Alexander Fraser
Party	Candidate	Votes	%	±%
Conservative	Charles Gifford	1,167	52.21	+3.12
Independent	J. Fisher	1,068	47.79	
Total valid votes		2,235	100.0	+12.31
Conservative gain from Liberal		Swing		+3.12
Source: History of the Electoral Districts, Legislatures and Ministries of the Province of Ontario

1875 Ontario general election: Northumberland West
Party	Candidate	Votes	%	±%
Liberal	William Hargraft	1,251	52.59	
Conservative	Charles Gifford	1,128	47.41	−4.80
Total valid votes		2,379	70.78	
Eligible voters		3,361		
Liberal gain from Conservative		Swing		+2.40
Source: Elections Ontario
