= George Guillet =

Canadian politician

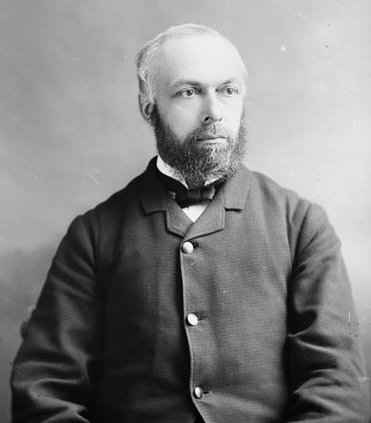

Member of the Canadian Parliament for Northumberland West
- In office 1881–1891
- Preceded by: James Cockburn
- Succeeded by: John Hargraft
- In office 1892–1900
- Preceded by: John Hargraft
- Succeeded by: John B. McColl

Personal details
- Born: July 19, 1840 Cobourg, Upper Canada
- Died: January 20, 1925 (aged 84)
- Party: Conservative

George Guillet (July 19, 1840 – January 20, 1925) was a Canadian politician.

Born in Cobourg, Upper Canada, the son of John Guillet and Charlotte Payne, his father was born in Saint Helier, Jersey, Channel Islands and his mother was born in Frome, Somerset, England. Guillet was educated at the public schools and at a private school of John Wilson. He then entered Victoria College in Cobourg before becoming a merchant in the wholesale and retail grocery and crockery business.

He enlisted in the Cobourg Rifle Company and was promoted to ensign and lieutenant. In 1873, he was promoted to captain and then quartermaster of the 40th battalion with a rank of major.

He was a councillor for the city of Cobourg and was mayor for four years. In provincial election of 1879, he ran for the Legislative Assembly of Ontario for the riding of Northumberland but was defeated. He was elected to the House of Commons of Canada for the electoral district of Northumberland West in an 1881 by-election held after the resignation of James Cockburn. A Conservative, he was re-elected in 1882, in an 1885 by-election (held being unseated), and 1887. He was defeated in 1891. He was re-elected in an 1892 by-election called after the election being declared void. He was re-elected in 1896 and was defeated in 1900.
