= Christine Stewart =

Canadian politician

The Honourable Christine Stewart PC

Member of Parliament for Northumberland
- In office 21 November 1988 – 27 November 2000
- Preceded by: George Hees
- Succeeded by: Paul Macklin

Personal details
- Born: 3 January 1941 Hamilton, Ontario
- Died: 25 April 2015 (aged 74) Cobourg, Ontario
- Party: Liberal Party of Canada
- Profession: Administrator, nurse, trustee

Christine Susan Stewart, PC (3 January 1941 – 25 April 2015) was a Canadian politician. She served three terms as a Liberal Party Member of Parliament for the riding of Northumberland in Ontario. During her career she held the cabinet positions of Secretary of State for Latin America and Africa, and Minister of the Environment.

== Early life and education ==
Stewart earned a degree in nursing (BScN) from the University of Toronto.

== Career ==
Stewart practised nursing for a short time before becoming involved in international development work first as a volunteer with her husband in Honduras in 1971-72. She co-founded a non-government organization, Horizons of Friendship, of which she was co-executive director until 1988. She raised her family of three children, served as a school board trustee and on several community church, social and arts bodies in Cobourg, Ontario.

She was first elected to the House of Commons of Canada as an Opposition member by a margin of 27 votes in 1988, following Conservative George Hees. During that term she was assigned the job of development assistance critic.

Stewart was elected twice more in 1993 and 1997 with substantive majorities and served in the cabinet of prime minister Jean Chrétien first as Secretary of State (Latin America and Africa) from 1993 to 1997, and then as Minister of the Environment from 1997 to 1999. She announced her resignation from politics for personal reasons before the election of 2000.

As Secretary of State, Latin America and Africa, she made official visits to most countries on those continents. For many of these countries, including some who had been receiving Canadian development assistance for years, it was the first visit by a Canadian minister.

As Minister of the Environment, Stewart headed the Canadian delegation to the Kyoto climate change negotiations and signed the Kyoto Accord on behalf of Canada. She pushed for action on the Kyoto Accord, improvements in the Canadian Environmental Protection Act, the Species at Risk Act, and the Canadian Environmental Assessment Act. However, she also fueled the fires of climate change deniers when, in 1998 she told editors and reporters of the Calgary Herald, "No matter if the science [of global warming] is all phony, there are collateral environmental benefits."

After leaving Canadian politics, Stewart acted as special envoy to Cameroon for the Commonwealth Secretary General until 2006 and continued her interest in addressing social issues in her community and work on good governance internationally.

She died on 25 April 2015.

26th Canadian Ministry (1993–2003) – Cabinet of Jean Chrétien
Cabinet post (1)
Predecessor	Office	Successor
Sergio Marchi	Minister of the Environment; 1997–1999	David Anderson
Sub-Cabinet Post
Predecessor	Title	Successor
	Secretary of State (Latin America and Africa) (1993–1997)	David Kilgour
