= Robert Mulholland =

Canadian politician

Ontario MPP
- In office 1883–1886
- Preceded by: John Collard Field
- Succeeded by: Corelli Collard Field
- Constituency: Northumberland West

Personal details
- Born: October 13, 1838 Cobourg, Upper Canada
- Died: February 21, 1917 (aged 78) Clifton Springs, New York
- Party: Conservative
- Spouse: Mary Kennedy (m. 1859)
- Occupation: Businessman

Robert Mulholland (October 13, 1838 – February 21, 1917) was an Ontario businessman and political figure. He represented Northumberland West in the Legislative Assembly of Ontario as a Conservative member from 1883 to 1886.

He was born near Cobourg in Upper Canada, the son of John Mulholland, an Irish immigrant, and studied at the Commercial College in Oswego, New York. He worked for a merchant in Baltimore for three years and was then given charge of a general store in Roseneath in Northumberland County owned by the same merchant. He also served as postmaster for Rosemeath. In 1857, with Alexander Kennedy, he purchased a general store in the nearby town of Alderville. In 1859, he married Mary Kennedy, his partner's sister. Around 1865, that business was sold and Mulholland moved to Cobourg where he opened a hardware and grocery store with Peter Brown. He also established a dry good business in partnership with William Graham. Mulholland served on the Cobourg town council.

He died in February 1917 at Clifton Springs, New York.

His son Robert Alexander managed a branch of the firm Mulholland & Brown in Port Hope and later served in the Canadian Senate.
