= William Hargraft =

Canadian politician

Ontario MPP
- In office 1875–1879
- Preceded by: Charles Gifford
- Succeeded by: John Collard Field
- Constituency: Northumberland West

Personal details
- Born: October 16, 1829 Templemore, County Tipperary, Ireland
- Died: July 8, 1887 (aged 57) Northumberland County, Ontario
- Party: Liberal
- Spouse: Mary Ross (m. 1853)
- Occupation: Businessman

William Hargraft (October 16, 1829 – July 8, 1887) was an Ontario merchant and political figure. He represented Northumberland West in the Legislative Assembly of Ontario from 1875 to 1879 as a Liberal member.

He was born in Templemore, County Tipperary, Ireland in 1829, the son of the local postmaster, George Hargraft. He came to Cobourg, Upper Canada with his family in 1833. In 1853, he married Mary Ross. Hargraft served on the town council for Cobourg, also serving as mayor and a commissioner of the Cobourg Town Trust. He was a director of the Hand-in-Hand Fire Insurance Company.

His son John later served as a member of the House of Commons.

== Electoral history ==
1875 Ontario general election: Northumberland West
Party	Candidate	Votes	%	±%
Liberal	William Hargraft	1,251	52.59	
Conservative	Charles Gifford	1,128	47.41	−4.80
Total valid votes		2,379	70.78	
Eligible voters		3,361		
Liberal gain from Conservative		Swing		+2.40
Source: Elections Ontario
