= Corelli Collard Field =

Canadian politician

Ontario MPP
- In office 1886–1898
- Preceded by: Robert Mulholland
- Succeeded by: Samuel Clarke
- Constituency: Northumberland West

Personal details
- Born: October 5, 1830 Tavistock, Devon, England
- Died: February 2, 1898 (aged 67) Cobourg, Ontario
- Party: Liberal
- Relations: John Collard Field, brother
- Occupation: Businessman

Corelli Collard Field (October 5, 1830 – February 2, 1898) was an Ontario businessman and political figure. He represented Northumberland West in the Legislative Assembly of Ontario from 1886 to 1898 as a Liberal member.

He was born in Tavistock, Devonshire, England in 1830, the son of John Field, and was brought to Cobourg, Upper Canada by his parents in 1834. He operated a general store in Cobourg in partnership with his brother John Collard. Field served on the public school board, served ten years on the town council and was mayor of Cobourg. He was also a commissioner of the Cobourg Town Trust.

His sister Myra Jane married William Kerr, who represented Northumberland West in the federal parliament. He died in 1898.

The geographic township of Field and the community of Field in Nipissing District were named in his honour.
