= James Lyons Biggar =

Canadian politician (1824–1879)

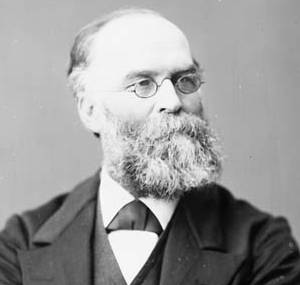
James Lyons Biggar

James Lyons Biggar (February 4, 1824 – May 24, 1879) was an Ontario merchant and political figure. He represented Northumberland East in the House of Commons of Canada from 1874 to 1878 as an Independent Liberal.

He was born in Carrying Place, Upper Canada in 1824, the son of Charles Biggar, whose parents had come from Biggar in Scotland. He was educated at Victoria College in Cobourg. In 1846, he married Isabella Hodgins; his wife's brothers, Thomas and John George, became prominent figures in the province. Biggar owned a general store and served as postmaster at Carrying Place. He also served as commissioner in the Court of Queen's Bench there. He represented East Northumberland in the Legislative Assembly of the Province of Canada from 1861 until Confederation. He was defeated by Joseph Keeler for the federal seat in 1872 and then defeated Keeler in 1874; that election was appealed but Biggar won the by-election which followed. In the 1878 general election, he was again defeated by Keeler. Biggar served as a member of the Senate for Victoria College. He died in Clifton Springs, New York at the age of 55.

The Biggars had eleven children:

- Charles Robert Webster Biggar, a lawyer who married Jane Helen Mowat, the daughter of Oliver Mowat. Their son Oliver Mowat Biggar served as Canada's first Chief Electoral Officer.
- Frances Camilla Biggar, who married George R. Pattullo, a newspaper publisher from Woodstock, Ontario.
- William Hodgins Biggar, a lawyer who served in the Ontario legislative assembly, who married Marie Louise Ballou. Their son, Winchester Henry Biggar, would later serve as alderman on the Montreal City Council and chairman of the Montreal Metropolitan Commission.
- Alexander Murray Biggar, who died young.
- James Lyons Biggar, a military figure who helped to establish the Canadian Army.
- Edward Herbert Biggar, who died young.
- Sarah Isabel Biggar, who married George Elliott Casey; the latter served in the House of Commons.
- Mary Emmeline Biggar, who married George F. Burton.
- George Coltman Biggar, a prominent Toronto businessman who married Ethel B. Tate.
- Eliza Maria Biggar, who married Richard A. Bull.
- Henry Percival Biggar, an authority on the history of New France, who served as chief archivist for Canada in Europe.

Mr. Biggar's sister Eliza Maria would marry Charles Stewart Wilson, and their son Herbert Charles Wilson would serve in the legislative assembly for the Northwest Territories.

Biggar Township in Nipissing District was named in his honour.

== Electoral record ==
1872 Canadian federal election: East Riding of Northumberland
Party	Candidate	Votes
Liberal–Conservative	KEELER, Joseph	1,497
Independent Liberal	BIGGAR, J.L.	1,430

1874 Canadian federal election: East Riding of Northumberland
Party	Candidate	Votes
Independent Liberal	BIGGAR, James Lyons	1,662
Liberal–Conservative	KEELER, J.	1,497

By-election: On Mr. Biggar being unseated on petition, 12 December 1874: East Riding of Northumberland
Party	Candidate	Votes
Independent Liberal	BIGGAR, James Lyons	1,670
Unknown	COCKBURN, James	1,385

1878 Canadian federal election: East Riding of Northumberland
Party	Candidate	Votes
Liberal–Conservative	KEELER, Joseph	1,799
Independent Liberal	BIGGAR, J.L.	1,736
