= Samuel Clarke (Canadian politician) =

Canadian politician

Ontario MPP
- In office 1898–1926
- Preceded by: Corelli Collard Field
- Succeeded by: Riding abolished
- Constituency: Northumberland West

Mayor of Cobourg, Ontario
- In office 1887–1890

Personal details
- Born: July 29, 1853 Brampton, Canada West
- Died: July 8, 1928 (aged 74) Cobourg, Ontario
- Party: Liberal
- Occupation: Businessman

Samuel Clarke (July 29, 1853 – July 8, 1928) was a Canadian merchant and political figure. He represented Northumberland West in the Legislative Assembly of Ontario from 1898 to 1926 as a Liberal member.

He was born in Brampton, Canada West, the son of Thomas Clarke. He was mayor of Cobourg from 1887 to 1890. He died on July 8, 1928.
