= Northumberland West (provincial electoral district) =

Ontario electoral district

Defunct provincial electoral district
- Legislature: Legislative Assembly of Ontario
- District created: 1867
- District abolished: 1925
- First contested: 1867
- Last contested: 1923

Northumberland West was an electoral riding in Ontario, Canada. It was created in 1867 at the time of confederation and was abolished in 1925 before the 1926 election. It was merged with Northumberland East to form Northumberland.

== Members of Provincial Parliament ==
Northumberland West
Assembly	Years	Member	Party
1st	1867–1871	Alexander Fraser	Liberal
2nd	1871–1871	Alexander Fraser	Liberal
2nd	1872–1874	Charles Gifford	Conservative
3rd	1875–1879	William Hargraft	Liberal
4th	1879–1883	John Collard Field	Liberal
5th	1883–1886	Robert Mulholland	Conservative
6th	1886–1890	Corelli Collard Field	Liberal
7th	1890–1894	Corelli Collard Field	Liberal
8th	1894–1898	Corelli Collard Field	Liberal
9th	1898–1902	Samuel Clarke	Liberal
10th	1902–1904	Samuel Clarke	Liberal
11th	1905–1908	Samuel Clarke	Liberal
12th	1908–1911	Samuel Clarke	Liberal
13th	1911–1914	Samuel Clarke	Liberal
14th	1914–1919	Samuel Clarke	Liberal
15th	1919–1923	Samuel Clarke	Liberal
16th	1923–1926	Samuel Clarke	Liberal
Sourced from the Ontario Legislative Assembly
Merged into Northumberland before the 1926 election

== Election results ==
1923 Ontario general election
Party	Candidate	Votes	%	±%
Liberal	Samuel Clarke	2,810	51.44	–3.88
Conservative	Frederick Desmond Boggs	2,653	48.56	+3.88
Total valid votes		5,463	99.26	
Total rejected ballots		41	0.74	–3.51
Turnout		5,504	69.94	–4.07
Eligible voters		7,870		
Liberal hold		Swing		–3.88
Source: Elections Ontario

1919 Ontario general election
Party	Candidate	Votes	%	±%
Liberal	Samuel Clarke	3,401	55.32	+3.06
Conservative	Frederick Desmond Boggs	2,747	44.68	–3.06
Total valid votes		6,148	95.75	
Total rejected ballots		273	4.25	+3.35
Turnout		6,421	74.01	–25.32
Eligible voters		8,676		
Liberal hold		Swing		+3.06
Source: Elections Ontario

1914 Ontario general election
Party	Candidate	Votes	%	±%
Liberal	Samuel Clarke	1,609	52.26	–1.63
Conservative	George Greer	1,470	47.74	+1.63
Total valid votes		3,079	99.10	
Total rejected ballots		28	0.90	+0.37
Turnout		3,107	99.33	+19.58
Eligible voters		3,128		
Liberal hold		Swing		–1.63
Source: Elections Ontario

1911 Ontario general election
Party	Candidate	Votes	%	±%
Liberal	Samuel Clarke	1,615	53.89	+0.44
Conservative	Hugh McCullough	1,382	46.11	–0.44
Total valid votes		2,997	99.47	
Total rejected ballots		16	0.53	+0.30
Turnout		3,013	79.75	–12.63
Eligible voters		3,778		
Liberal hold		Swing		+0.44
Source: Elections Ontario

1908 Ontario general election
Party	Candidate	Votes	%	±%
Liberal	Samuel Clarke	1,591	53.44	–1.47
Conservative	Frederick Desmond Boggs	1,386	46.56	+1.47
Total valid votes		2,977	99.77	
Total rejected ballots		7	0.23	–0.31
Turnout		2,984	92.38	+10.75
Eligible voters		3,230		
Liberal hold		Swing		–1.47
Source: Elections Ontario

1905 Ontario general election
Party	Candidate	Votes	%	±%
Liberal	Samuel Clarke	1,510	54.91	+1.41
Conservative	Frank M. Field	1,240	45.09	–1.41
Total valid votes		2,750	99.46	
Total rejected ballots		15	0.54	+0.01
Turnout		2,765	81.64	–1.00
Eligible voters		3,387		
Liberal hold		Swing		+1.41
Source: Elections Ontario

1902 Ontario general election
Party	Candidate	Votes	%	±%
Liberal	Samuel Clarke	1,606	53.50	+1.39
Conservative	George Spence	1,396	46.50	–1.39
Total valid votes		3,002	99.47	
Total rejected ballots		16	0.53	+0.03
Turnout		3,018	82.64	–2.31
Eligible voters		3,652		
Liberal hold		Swing		+1.39
Source: Elections Ontario

1898 Ontario general election
Party	Candidate	Votes	%	±%
Liberal	Samuel Clarke	1,654	52.11	–0.16
Conservative	John T. Mulholland	1,520	47.89	+1.06
Total valid votes		3,174	99.50	
Total rejected ballots		16	0.50	–0.31
Turnout		3,190	84.95	+11.77
Eligible voters		3,755		
Liberal hold		Swing		–0.61
Source: Elections Ontario

1894 Ontario general election
Party	Candidate	Votes	%	±%
Liberal	Corelli Collard Field	1,402	52.27	–5.54
Conservative	George Mitchell	1,256	46.83	+4.65
Independent	Mr. Kirk	24	0.89	–
Total valid votes		2,682	99.19	
Total rejected ballots		22	0.81	–0.17
Turnout		2,704	73.18	+7.28
Eligible voters		3,695		
Liberal hold		Swing		–5.10
Source: Elections Ontario

1890 Ontario general election
Party	Candidate	Votes	%	±%
Liberal	Corelli Collard Field	1,453	57.82	–0.25
Conservative	S. Purser	1,060	42.18	+0.25
Total valid votes		2,513	99.02	
Total rejected ballots		25	0.99	+0.44
Turnout		2,538	65.91	–4.00
Eligible voters		3,851		
Liberal hold		Swing		–0.25
Source: Elections Ontario

1886 Ontario general election
Party	Candidate	Votes	%	±%
Liberal	Corelli Collard Field	1,710	58.06	+9.03
Conservative	J. Vance Graveley	1,235	41.94	–9.03
Total valid votes		2,945	99.46	
Total rejected ballots		16	0.54	–0.27
Turnout		2,961	69.90	–2.07
Eligible voters		4,236		
Liberal gain from Conservative		Swing		+9.03
Source: Elections Ontario

1883 Ontario general election
Party	Candidate	Votes	%	±%
Conservative	Robert Mulholland	1,506	50.96	+1.36
Liberal	John Collard Field	1,449	49.04	–1.36
Total valid votes		2,955	99.19	
Total rejected ballots		24	0.81	+0.81
Turnout		2,979	71.97	+6.44
Eligible voters		4,139		
Conservative gain from Liberal		Swing		+1.36
Source: Elections Ontario

1879 Ontario general election
Party	Candidate	Votes	%	±%
Liberal	John Collard Field	1,333	50.40	−2.19
Conservative	G. Guillet	1,312	49.60	+2.19
Total valid votes		2,645	65.54	−5.25
Eligible voters		4,036		
Liberal hold		Swing		−2.19
Source: Elections Ontario

1875 Ontario general election
Party	Candidate	Votes	%	±%
Liberal	William Hargraft	1,251	52.59	
Conservative	Charles Gifford	1,128	47.41	−4.80
Total valid votes		2,379	70.78	
Eligible voters		3,361		
Liberal gain from Conservative		Swing		+2.40
Source: Elections Ontario

Ontario provincial by-election, January 1872 Resignation of Alexander Fraser
Party	Candidate	Votes	%	±%
Conservative	Charles Gifford	1,167	52.21	+3.12
Independent	J. Fisher	1,068	47.79	
Total valid votes		2,235	100.0	+12.31
Conservative gain from Liberal		Swing		+3.12
Source: History of the Electoral Districts, Legislatures and Ministries of the Province of Ontario

1871 Ontario general election
Party	Candidate	Votes	%
Liberal	Alexander Fraser	1,013	50.90
Conservative	Charles Gifford	977	49.10
Turnout		1,990	67.48
Eligible voters		2,949	
Liberal hold			
Source: Elections Ontario

1867 Ontario general election
Party	Candidate	Votes
Liberal	Alexander Fraser	Acclaimed
Source: Elections Ontario
