= John Hughes Bennett =

English physician, physiologist and pathologist

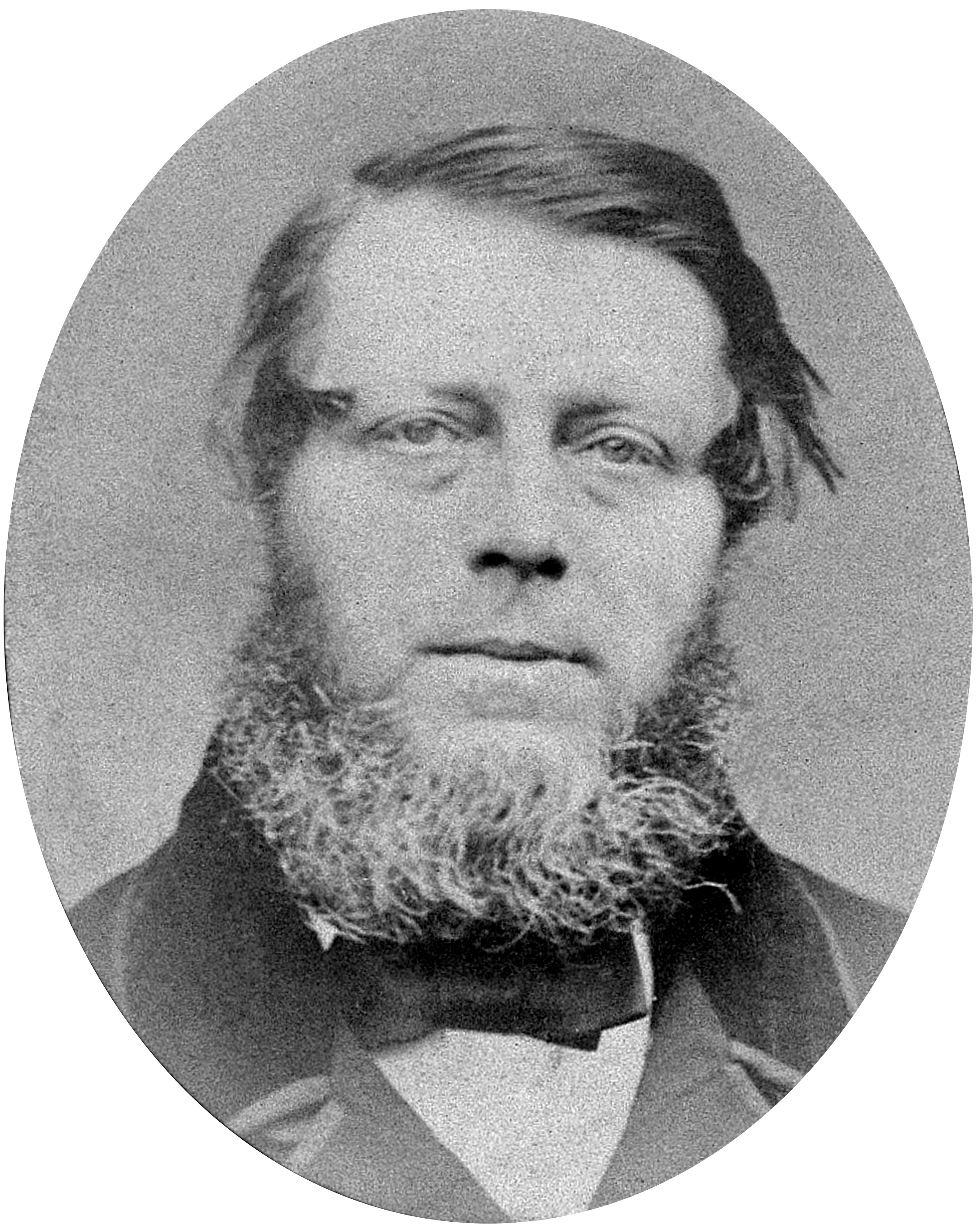
- Born: 31 August 1812
- Died: 25 September 1875 (aged 63)
- Education: Mount Radford School, University of Edinburgh Medical School
- Occupations: physician, pathologist
- Known for: leukemia

John Hughes Bennett PRCPE FRSE (31 August 1812 – 25 September 1875) was an English physician, physiologist and pathologist. His main contribution to medicine has been the first description of leukemia as a blood disorder (1845). The first person to describe leukemia as an unknown disease was Alfred François Donné.

Bennett was the first doctor to describe aspergillosis. In his seminal paper published in 1842 entitled "On the parasitic vegetable structures found growing in living animals" he makes the very first description of Aspergillus (a pathogenic fungus) growing in the lung tissue of humans.

== Biography ==
Born in London, he was educated at Mount Radford School in Exeter, and being destined for the medical profession he entered an apprenticeship with Mr Sedgwick, a surgeon in Maidstone. In 1833 he began his studies at Edinburgh, and in 1837 graduated with the highest honours and a gold medal, with a dissertation entitled The Physiology and Pathology of the Brain. During his last year at Edinburgh he was elected President of the Royal Medical Society, Royal Physical Society of Edinburgh, and a vice-president of the Anatomical and Physiological Society.

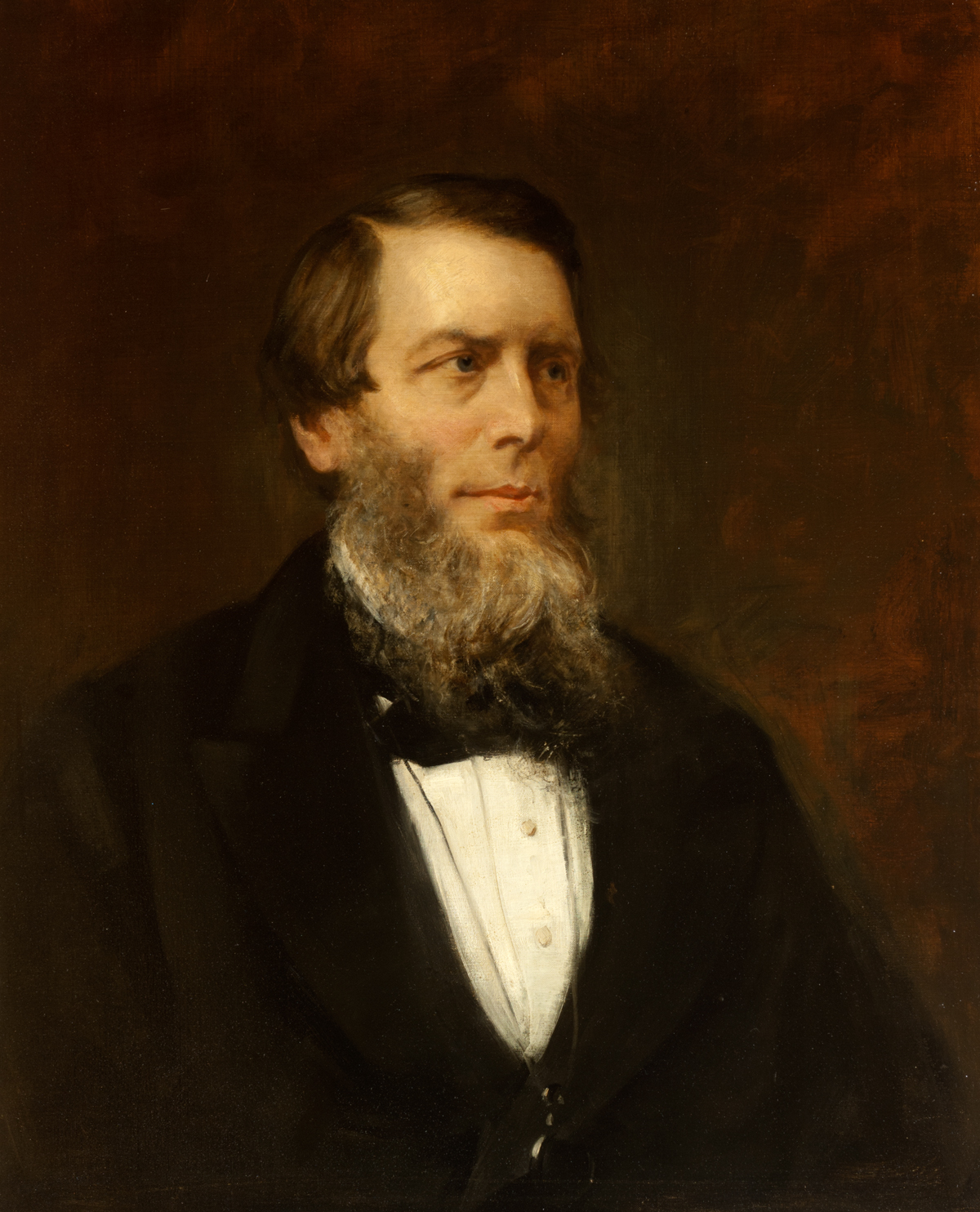
John Hughes Bennett

During the next two years he studied in Paris (where he founded the English-speaking Medical Society) and then spent two in Germany (mainly at Heidelberg and the Charité Hospital in Berlin), before returning to Edinburgh in 1841 where he published a Treatise on Cod-liver Oil as a Therapeutic Agent. In the same year he began to lecture as an extra-academical teacher on histology, drawing attention to the importance of the microscope in the investigation of disease; and as physician to the Royal Public Dispensary of Edinburgh he instituted courses of polyclinical medicine. In 1843 he was elected a Fellow of the Royal Society of Edinburgh his proposer being Sir Robert Christison. His address was then listed as 1 Glenfinlas Street, just off Charlotte Square. In the same year he was appointed professor of the Institutes of Medicine at Edinburgh, and performed the duties of that chair with great energy until incapacitated by failing health, in 1874.

In 1844 Bennett was elected a member of the Harveian Society of Edinburgh and was one of its secretaries from 1849 to 1858. He served as President in 1859.

In 1845, Bennett published a paper entitled a Case of Hypertrophy of the Spleen and Liver in which Death Took Place from Suppuration of the Blood, the first recorded case of leukemia, then known as leucocythemia, in the Edinburgh Medical and Surgical Journal.

In 1849, Bennett was elected as a member to the American Philosophical Society.

In 1855 he was a prime opponent of Thomas Laycock for the Edinburgh Chair. His obituary refers to this as an "exciting contest". Michalel Barfoot wrote in 1995 that in fact extremely bitter, and became a source of great dissension in subsequent years. Barfoot describes him as having "the personality biographers' dreams are made of", and quotes Bennett's biographer John M'Kendrick as stating that Bennett "regarded his defeat (by Laycock) as the great disappointment of his life, and there is little doubt that it tended to a certain extent to distort his views of men an things".

In 1873, he was elected a member of the French Academy of Medicine and granted recognition by the French government to practice medicine in France. In August 1875 he was able to be present at the meeting of the British Medical Association in Edinburgh, on which occasion he received the degree of LL.D., but the fatigue he then underwent brought on a relapse, and he was compelled to have the operation of lithotomy performed. He sank rapidly and died on 25 September 1875 at Norwich.

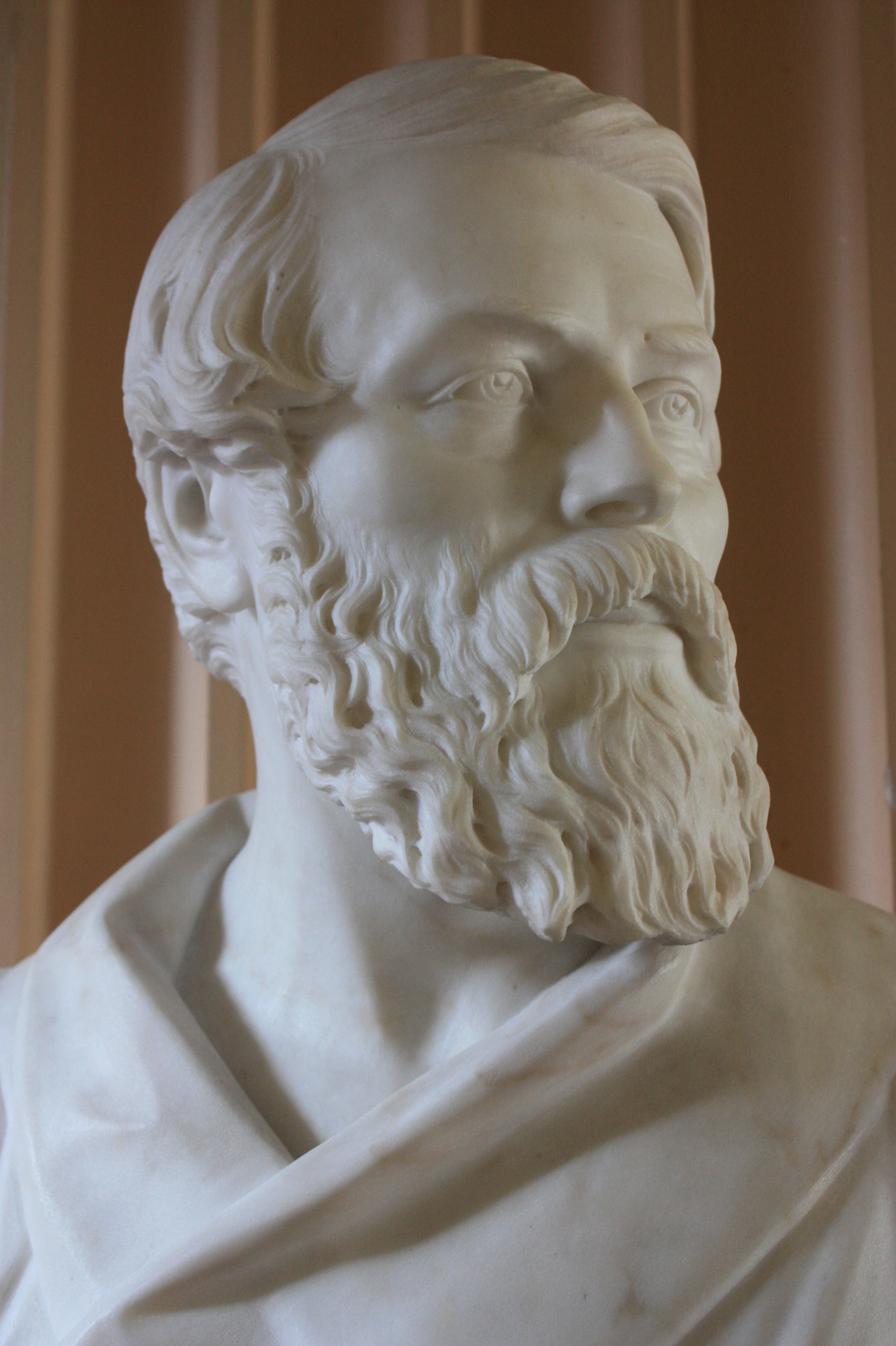
Bust of John Hughes Bennett by William Brodie, 1875, Old College, University of Edinburgh

Bennett died at Norwich on 25 September 1875, nine days after an operation for stone, performed by Mr. Cadge, from which his enfeebled strength did not enable him to recover. He was buried in the Dean Cemetery, Edinburgh, on 30 September by the side of his friends Goodsir and Edward Forbes.

== Works ==
His publications were very numerous including Lectures on Clinical Medicine (1850–1856), which in second and subsequent editions were called Clinical Lectures on the Principles and Practice of Medicine, and were translated into various languages, including Russian and Hindi; Leucocythaemia (1852), the first recorded cure of which was published by him in 1845; Outlines of Physiology (1858), reprinted from the 8th edition of the Encyclopædia Britannica, Pathology and Treatment of Pulmonary Tuberculosis (1853); Textbook of Physiology (1871–1872).

Because Bennett introduced practical classes in the teaching of physiology, he is considered the father of physiological education in medical schools. He was also the first to teach the clinical use of the microscope systematically and its uses in the teaching of pathology and physiology. He opposed bloodletting and was highly influential in changing medical therapeutics towards a more science-based approach in the second half of the 19th century. He supported the admission of women to medical schools and advocated a better interaction between medical specialities.

== Memorials ==
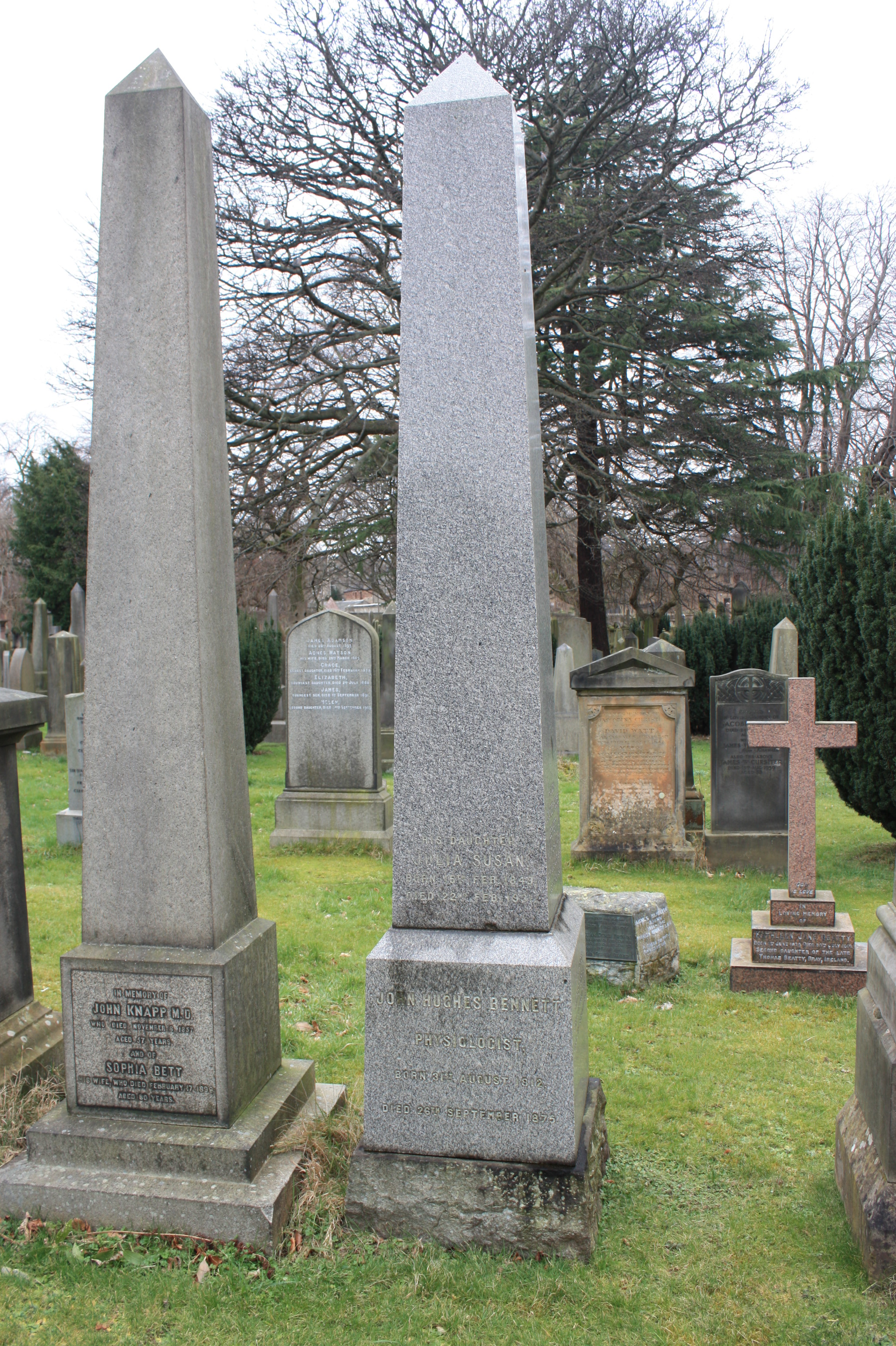
The grave of John Hughes Bennett (right), Dean Cemetery in Edinburgh

In 1901, the University of Edinburgh inaugurated the John Hughes Bennett Laboratory of Experimental Pathology, in homage to "one of that galaxy of talent and genius that illuminated Edinburgh in the middle decades of the last century". A second laboratory with his name was opened in 1998, in a joint venture between Britain's Leukaemia Research Fund, the University of Edinburgh and the Western General Hospital Trust.

== Family ==
On 22 August 1844 Bennett married Jessie Samuel (1824–1906), a niece of the Reverend Alexander Simpson (later moderator of the Church of Scotland). They had a son Dr Alexander Hughes Bennett (1848–1901) who became a consultant neurologist in London and four daughters. Their daughter Harriet Sophia Bennett (1850–1905), married Robert Cox MP.

== Freemasonry ==
Rhind was a Scottish Freemason. He was Initiated in Lodge Canongate Kilwinning, No. 2, on 23 November 1836.
