= Northumberland (Ontario federal electoral district) =

Former federal electoral district in Ontario, Canada

Ontario electoral district
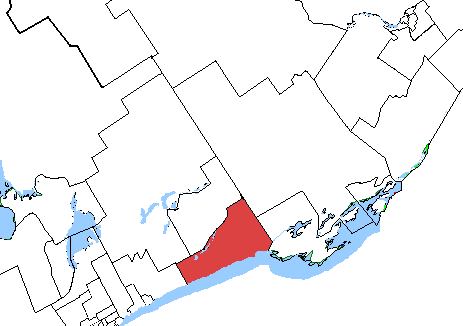
- Map of the riding as compared to nearby ridings (1996-2003)

Defunct federal electoral district
- Legislature: House of Commons
- District created: 1914, 1976
- District abolished: 1966, 2003
- First contested: 1917
- Last contested: 2000

Northumberland was a federal and provincial electoral district in Ontario, Canada, that was represented in the House of Commons of Canada from 1917 to 1968 and from 1987 to 2003, and in the Legislative Assembly of Ontario from 1999 to 2007.

This riding was first created in 1914 from Northumberland East and Northumberland West ridings. It initially consisted of the county of Northumberland, excluding the township of Monaghan South. In 1947, South Monaghan was added to the riding, so that it consisted of the county of Northumberland. It was abolished in 1966 when it was redistributed between Northumberland—Durham and Prince Edward—Hastings ridings.

In 1976, Northumberland riding was recreated from parts of those two ridings. The new riding consisted of the County of Northumberland (including the Village of Hastings), but excluding the Township of Hope, the Town of Cobourg, and the part of the Township of Hamilton lying west of the Town of Cobourg and south of the Macdonald Cartier Freeway), and the Townships of Rawdon and Sidney (but excluding the city of Belleville) in the County of Hastings. In 1987, it was redefined to consist of the County of Northumberland and the City of Trenton.

The electoral district was abolished in 2003 when it was merged into Northumberland—Quinte West riding.

== Members of Parliament ==
This riding has elected the following members of Parliament:

| Parliament | Years | Member | Party |
|---|---|---|---|
Riding created from Northumberland East and Northumberland West
| 13th | 1917–1921 | Charles Arthur Munson | Government (Unionist) |
| 14th | 1921–1925 | Milton Edgar Maybee | Conservative |
| 15th | 1925–1926 | Milton Edgar Maybee | Conservative |
| 16th | 1926–1930 | Milton Edgar Maybee | Conservative |
| 17th | 1930–1935 | William Alexander Fraser | Liberal |
| 18th | 1935–1940 | William Alexander Fraser | Liberal |
| 19th | 1940–1945 | William Alexander Fraser | Liberal |
| 20th | 1945–1949 | Earle Drope | Progressive Conservative |
| 21st | 1949–1953 | Frederick Robertson | Liberal |
| 22nd | 1953–1957 | Frederick Robertson | Liberal |
| 23rd | 1957–1958 | Ben Thompson | Progressive Conservative |
| 24th | 1958–1962 | Ben Thompson | Progressive Conservative |
| 25th | 1962–1963 | Harry Oliver Bradley | Progressive Conservative |
| 26th | 1963–1965 | Pauline Jewett | Liberal |
| 27th | 1965–1968 | George Hees | Progressive Conservative |
Riding dissolved into Northumberland—Durham and Prince Edward—Hastings
Riding re-created from Northumberland—Durham and Prince Edward—Hastings
| 31st | 1979–1980 | George Hees | Progressive Conservative |
| 32nd | 1980–1984 | George Hees | Progressive Conservative |
| 33rd | 1984–1988 | George Hees | Progressive Conservative |
| 34th | 1988–1993 | Christine Stewart | Liberal |
| 35th | 1993–1997 | Christine Stewart | Liberal |
| 36th | 1997–2000 | Christine Stewart | Liberal |
| 37th | 2000–2004 | Paul Macklin | Liberal |
Riding dissolved into Northumberland—Quinte West

== Election results ==
1917 Canadian federal election
| Party | Candidate | Votes |
|---|---|---|
| Government (Unionist) | Charles Arthur Munson | 6,313 |
| Opposition (Laurier Liberals) | Samuel Drayton Dudley | 2,916 |

1921 Canadian federal election
| Party | Candidate | Votes |
|---|---|---|
| Conservative | Milton Edgar Maybee | 6,849 |
| Progressive | Frederick John Slade | 6,073 |
| Liberal | Charles Wesley Kerr | 1,778 |

1925 Canadian federal election
| Party | Candidate | Votes |
|---|---|---|
| Conservative | Milton Edgar Maybee | 7,815 |
| Progressive | Frederick John Slade | 6,665 |

1926 Canadian federal election
| Party | Candidate | Votes |
|---|---|---|
| Conservative | Milton Edgar Maybee | 8,113 |
| Liberal | William Alexander Fraser | 7,727 |

1930 Canadian federal election
| Party | Candidate | Votes |
|---|---|---|
| Liberal | William Alexander Fraser (politician) | 8,436 |
| Conservative | Milton Edgar Maybee | 7,495 |
| Independent | Edith Kerr Macdonald | 180 |

1935 Canadian federal election
| Party | Candidate | Votes |
|---|---|---|
| Liberal | William Alexander Fraser (politician) | 8,609 |
| Conservative | James Franklin B. Belford | 6,842 |
| Reconstruction | Charles H. Davidson | 869 |
| Co-operative Commonwealth | William Thompson | 162 |

1940 Canadian federal election
| Party | Candidate | Votes |
|---|---|---|
| Liberal | William Alexander Fraser (politician) | 8,194 |
| National Government | Jamieson Bone | 7,241 |

1945 Canadian federal election
| Party | Candidate | Votes |
|---|---|---|
| Progressive Conservative | Robert Earle Drope | 7,996 |
| Liberal | Charles Smith Rutherford | 7,168 |
| Co-operative Commonwealth | Frederick D. Calnan | 570 |

1949 Canadian federal election
| Party | Candidate | Votes |
|---|---|---|
| Liberal | Frederick Greystock Robertson | 9,374 |
| Progressive Conservative | Robert Earle Drope | 8,522 |

1953 Canadian federal election
| Party | Candidate | Votes |
|---|---|---|
| Liberal | Frederick G. Robertson | 9,595 |
| Progressive Conservative | Olley Taylor | 7,623 |
| Co-operative Commonwealth | Franklin Raymond Armstrong | 442 |

1957 Canadian federal election
| Party | Candidate | Votes |
|---|---|---|
| Progressive Conservative | Ben Thompson | 10,062 |
| Liberal | Fred G. Robertson | 9,112 |

1958 Canadian federal election
| Party | Candidate | Votes |
|---|---|---|
| Progressive Conservative | Ben Thompson | 12,517 |
| Liberal | Wesley R. Sweet | 7,028 |

1962 Canadian federal election
| Party | Candidate | Votes |
|---|---|---|
| Progressive Conservative | Harry Oliver Bradley | 10,451 |
| Liberal | Pauline Jewett | 9,693 |
| New Democratic | Fred Keith Mabee | 870 |

1963 Canadian federal election
| Party | Candidate | Votes |
|---|---|---|
| Liberal | Pauline Jewett | 10,343 |
| Progressive Conservative | Harry Bradley | 9,838 |
| New Democratic | Fred Keith Mabee | 621 |
| Social Credit | Gérard Beaudry | 388 |

1965 Canadian federal election
| Party | Candidate | Votes |
|---|---|---|
| Progressive Conservative | George Hees | 10,876 |
| Liberal | Pauline Jewett | 10,313 |
| New Democratic | Ian E. Reilly | 712 |

1979 Canadian federal election
| Party | Candidate | Votes |
|---|---|---|
| Progressive Conservative | George Hees | 22,536 |
| Liberal | Duncan Armstrong | 10,200 |
| New Democratic | Hugh Jenney | 5,150 |

1980 Canadian federal election
| Party | Candidate | Votes |
|---|---|---|
| Progressive Conservative | George Hees | 17,860 |
| Liberal | Wilf Wilkinson | 13,925 |
| New Democratic | Hugh Jenney | 5,108 |

1984 Canadian federal election
| Party | Candidate | Votes |
|---|---|---|
| Progressive Conservative | George Hees | 24,060 |
| Liberal | John L. Hill | 9,534 |
| New Democratic | Bill Cassells | 4,633 |
| Green | Adrian O'Connell | 262 |
| Libertarian | Mike Lantz | 138 |

1988 Canadian federal election
| Party | Candidate | Votes |
|---|---|---|
| Liberal | Christine Stewart | 18,600 |
| Progressive Conservative | Reg Jewell | 18,572 |
| New Democratic | Gord Barnes | 6,498 |
| Christian Heritage | John A. Meiboom | 1,093 |
| Libertarian | Stephen R.B. Prust | 194 |
| Rhinoceros | Real E. Humble | 184 |
| Confederation of Regions | Frank Mitchell | 94 |

1993 Canadian federal election
| Party | Candidate | Votes |
|---|---|---|
| Liberal | Christine Stewart | 23,609 |
| Reform | Gord Johnston | 11,552 |
| Progressive Conservative | Reg Jewell | 10,147 |
| New Democratic | Diana Stewart | 1,791 |
| Christian Heritage | Joe Appleman | 341 |
| National | Leona Noel | 319 |
| Libertarian | Steve R. Prust | 285 |
| Natural Law | Roy Anderson | 250 |

1997 Canadian federal election
| Party | Candidate | Votes |
|---|---|---|
| Liberal | Christine Stewart | 21,182 |
| Progressive Conservative | Ralph Zarboni | 11,458 |
| Reform | Al Matthews | 10,602 |
| New Democratic | Murray Weppler | 2,678 |
| Christian Heritage | Jeffrey Streutker | 355 |

2000 Canadian federal election: Northumberland
| Party | Candidate | Votes |
|---|---|---|
| Liberal | Paul Macklin | 20,109 |
| Alliance | Rick Norlock | 11,410 |
| Progressive Conservative | Ralph James Zarboni | 8,768 |
| New Democratic | Ben Burd | 2,141 |
| Green | Tom Lawson | 1,102 |
| Canadian Action | Gail Thompson | 276 |

== See also ==
- List of Canadian electoral districts
- Historical federal electoral districts of Canada
