= Darius Crouter =

Canadian politician (1827–1910)

- Born: May 5, 1827; Haldimand Township, Upper Canada
- Died: May 9, 1910 (aged 83)

Darius Crouter (May 5, 1827 – May 9, 1910) was a Canadian minister, farmer and political figure. He represented Northumberland East in the House of Commons of Canada from 1881 to 1882 as an Independent Liberal member.

He was born in Haldimand Township, Upper Canada. Crouter was a minister of the Methodist Episcopal Church, who retired to farming later in life. He was elected to the House of Commons in an 1881 by-election held following the death of Joseph Keeler. Crouter was defeated when he ran for reelection in 1882. He lived near Brighton.

By-election: On Mr. Keeler's death, 21 January 1881: East Riding of Northumberland
Party	Candidate	Votes
Independent Liberal	Darius Crouter	acclaimed

1882 Canadian federal election: East Riding of Northumberland
Party	Candidate	Votes
Conservative	Edward Cochrane	2,073
Independent Liberal	Darius Crouter	1,800
