= William Alexander Fraser (politician) =

Canadian politician

Member of Parliament for Northumberland
- In office 1930–1945
- Preceded by: Milton Edgar Maybee
- Succeeded by: William Alexander Fraser

Canadian Senator from Ontario
- In office 25 June 1949 – 26 October 1962

Personal details
- Born: 24 April 1886 Trenton, Ontario, Canada
- Died: 26 October 1962 (aged 76) Kingston, Ontario, Canada
- Party: Liberal
- Profession: Politician; businessman

William Alexander Fraser (24 April 1886 – 26 October 1962) was a Canadian politician.

== Background ==
Fraser was born in Trenton, Ontario where he served as mayor in the 1920s. He represented the riding of Northumberland in Parliament with the Liberal party from 1930 through 1945. He served as Chief Whip in the Mackenzie King government. He was later appointed to the Senate, where he remained until his death in 1962.

Fraser pursued a variety of business interests including the Trenton Cooperage Mills, a major cold storage business, fruit-growing and processing, regional newspapers, movie theatres, and a bridge-building company that later helped manufacture corvettes for the Royal Canadian Navy during World War II. He was known as "Nickel Billy", perhaps in reference to his business skills.

He died at a Kingston, Ontario hospital, aged 76.
