= Edward Cochrane =

Canadian politician

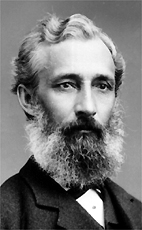
- Edward Cochrane

Member of the Canada Parliament for Northumberland East
- In office 1882–1887
- Preceded by: Darius Crouter
- Succeeded by: Albert Mallory
- In office 1887–1907
- Preceded by: Albert Mallory
- Succeeded by: Charles Lewis Owen

Personal details
- Born: 1 January 1834 Cramahe Township, Upper Canada
- Died: 8 March 1907 (aged 73) Ottawa, Ontario
- Party: Conservative

Edward Cochrane (1 January 1834 – 8 March 1907) was a Canadian politician.

Born in Cramahe Township, Upper Canada, Cochrane educated in the village of Colborne. A farmer, he was for many years a School Trustee, Township Councillor, Deputy Reeve, Reeve and Warden of Northumberland and Durham. He was first elected to the House of Commons of Canada for the electoral district of Northumberland East in the general elections of 1882. A Conservative, he was defeated by 13 votes in 1887, but the election having been declared void for bribery by agents and he was elected on 22 December of same year. This election was also voided and he was again elected on 21 November 1888. He was re-elected in 1891, 1896, 1900 and 1904. He died while in office in 1907.

== Electoral record ==
1882 Canadian federal election: East Riding of Northumberland
Party	Candidate	Votes
Conservative	Edward Cochrane	2,073
Independent Liberal	Darius Crouter	1,800

1887 Canadian federal election: East Riding of Northumberland
Party	Candidate	Votes
Liberal	Albert Elhanon Mallory	2,291
Conservative	Edward Cochrane	2,278

By-election: On Mr. Mallory being unseated for bribery by agents, 22 December 1887: East Riding of Northumberland
Party	Candidate	Votes
Conservative	Edward Cochrane	2,148
Liberal	Albert E. Mallory	2,124

By-election: On election being declared void, 21 November 1888: East Riding of Northumberland
Party	Candidate	Votes
Conservative	Edward Cochrane	2,074
Liberal	Albert E. Mallory	2,028

1891 Canadian federal election: East Riding of Northumberland
Party	Candidate	Votes
Conservative	E. Cochrane	2,495
Liberal	M. P. Ketchum	2,259

1896 Canadian federal election: East Riding of Northumberland
Party	Candidate	Votes
Conservative	E. Cochrane	2,410
Patrons of Industry	C. A. Mallory	2,013

1900 Canadian federal election: East Riding of Northumberland
Party	Candidate	Votes
Conservative	Edward Cochrane	2,452
Liberal	Robert Baldwin Denike	2,086

1904 Canadian federal election: East Riding of Northumberland
Party	Candidate	Votes
Conservative	Edward Cochrane	2,402
Liberal	John H. Douglas	2,196
