= William Kerr (Canadian politician) =

Canadian politician

William Kerr (February 27, 1836 – November 22, 1906) was a Canadian lawyer and politician. He represented Northumberland West in the House of Commons of Canada from 1874 to 1878 as a Liberal member and served in the Senate of Canada from 1899 to 1906.

== Life ==
He was born in Ameliasburg, Upper Canada in 1836, the son of Francis William Kerr, an Irish immigrant, and Olive Shelley, and was educated at Victoria University in Cobourg. Kerr later served as a member of the university's senate and as its bursar. He was called to the bar in 1859 and set up practice in Cobourg. Kerr served on the town council for Cobourg and was mayor from 1867 to 1873. After his re-election in 1874, he was unseated on appeal but won the subsequent by-election. He was made a Queen's Counsel in 1876. He ran unsuccessfully for the federal seat in 1878 and 1882. Kerr was named to the Senate in 1899 and died in office in 1906 in Toronto, Ontario.

He married Myra Jane Field, the sister of MPPs John C. and Corelli C. Field. His daughter, Edith Kerr Macdonald (1870–1957), was the first woman to hold a municipal office in Cobourg.
