= Charles Arthur Munson =

Canadian politician

Charles Arthur Munson (January 14, 1857 – May 19, 1922) was a political figure in Ontario, Canada. He represented Northumberland West from 1911 to 1917 as a Conservative and Northumberland from 1917 to 1921 as a Unionist Party member in the House of Commons of Canada.

He was born in Cobourg, Canada West, the son of Alfred E. Munson and Mary Dumble, and was educated there. He served on the town council for Cobourg from 1904 to 1906 and was mayor from 1907 to 1908. Munson ran unsuccessfully for a seat in the House of Commons in 1908. He died in Cobourg at the age of 65.
