= Ben Thompson (Canadian politician) =

Canadian politician

Benjamin Cope (Ben) Thompson

Member of Parliament for Northumberland
- In office June 1957 – April 1962

Personal details
- Born: 11 April 1924 Toronto, Ontario, Canada
- Died: 23 March 1998 (aged 73) Brighton, Ontario, Canada
- Party: Progressive Conservative
- Profession: barrister, lawyer

Benjamin Cope (Ben) Thompson (11 April 1924 – 23 March 1998) was a Canadian lawyer and politician. Thompson served as a Progressive Conservative party member of the House of Commons of Canada.

He was first elected at the Northumberland riding in the 1957 general election and re-elected there in the 1958 election. Thompson left federal politics after completing his second term, the 24th Canadian Parliament, and did not campaign in the 1962 election. He died of cancer on 23 March 1998.
