= Charles Hibbert Tupper =

Canadian politician and lawyer (1855–1927)

Sir Charles Hibbert Tupper
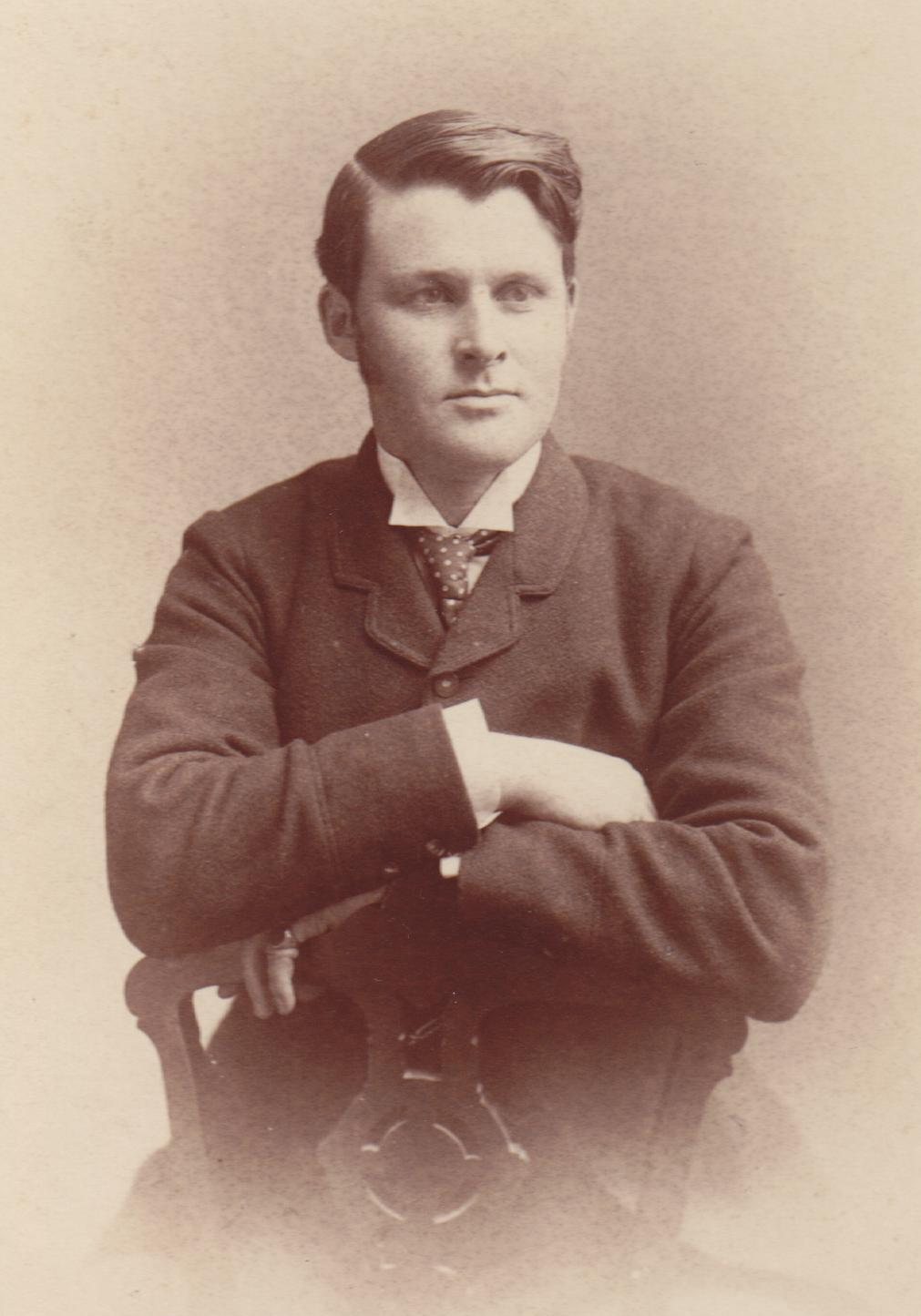

Member of the Canadian Parliament for Pictou
- In office 1882–1896 Serving with John McDougald
- Preceded by: John McDougald; Robert Doull
- In office 1896–1904 Serving with Adam Carr Bell
- Succeeded by: Edward Mortimer Macdonald

Personal details
- Born: August 3, 1855 Amherst, Nova Scotia
- Died: March 30, 1927 (aged 71) Vancouver, British Columbia, Canada
- Party: Conservative
- Spouse: Janet McDonald
- Children: 5
- Parent(s): Charles Tupper; Frances Morse
- Education: McGill University; Harvard Law School (LLB)
- Profession: Lawyer, Politician
- Cabinet: Minister of Marine and Fisheries (1888–1894); Minister of Justice and Attorney General of Canada (1894–1896); Solicitor General of Canada (1896)

Sir Charles Hibbert Tupper KCMG PC (August 3, 1855 – March 30, 1927) was a Canadian lawyer and politician.

== Family, early career ==
Tupper was the second son of Sir Charles Tupper, a physician, leading Conservative politician, and Canadian diplomat. The elder Tupper served as premier of Nova Scotia, was a Father of Confederation, and served briefly as prime minister of Canada in 1896. The younger Tupper practised law in Halifax, Nova Scotia, after articling to learn the profession; at the time there was no formal legal education in Atlantic Canada. He formed a successful partnership with Wallace Graham, and the two invited the young Robert Borden, a future prime minister who was one year older than Tupper, to join them in the late 1870s. A decade later, Borden became the firm's senior partner after Graham was appointed a judge and Tupper entered politics.

Tupper's younger brother William Johnston Tupper also became a Conservative politician.

== MP, Cabinet minister ==
He was elected as a Conservative MP in 1882. He was appointed Minister of Marine and Fisheries by Sir John A. Macdonald in 1888, and kept that position in subsequent Conservative cabinets until 1894, under PMs Sir John Abbott and Sir John Sparrow David Thompson.

He then became Minister of Justice in the government of Sir Mackenzie Bowell and attempted, unsuccessfully, to resolve the Manitoba Schools Question by drafting a bill to restore Separate School education for Catholics in Manitoba. Tupper resigned in January 1896 to protest Bowell's leadership, which had largely failed on this question, among others. He returned as Solicitor General of Canada in the short-lived government of his father, who became prime minister later in 1896, when Bowell stepped down. Tupper Sr. was defeated in the 1896 Canadian federal election, by Liberal Wilfrid Laurier, who became prime minister. Tupper remained an MP until his retirement from politics in 1904.

=== Knighted ===
In 1893, while minister of Marine and Fisheries, he was involved in the Bering Sea Arbitration between the United States and Canada as a representative of the British government, which at that time was responsible for Canadian foreign affairs. He was knighted in recognition for this service, which produced a successful outcome for Canada.

== Moves to British Columbia ==
In 1897 he moved to Victoria, British Columbia, and then moved to Vancouver in 1898, but continued as the Member of Parliament for Pictou, Nova Scotia, where he was re-elected in 1900. From 1898 he practised law in Vancouver, where he served as a bencher of the Law Society of British Columbia and was elected Treasurer (chief elected officer) for 1924-25. He represented Japanese-Canadians in a series of cases opposing discriminatory practices of the provincial government. In 1923, he was involved in the creation of the short-lived Provincial Party of British Columbia.

He died in Vancouver March 30, 1927, and was buried in nearby Burnaby, in Ocean View Burial Park.

== Family ==
In September 1879, Charles Hibbert Tupper married Janet McDonald, daughter of the Hon. James McDonald, Chief Justice of Nova Scotia, and his wife, Jane. The couple had four sons and three daughters. The couple lived in Parkside, Vancouver, B.C. Her sister married her brother-in-law, Mr. W. J. Tupper. Another sister married the Rev. L. H. Jordan, B.D., of Chicago.

== Electoral history ==
1882 Canadian federal election: Pictou
Party	Candidate	Votes	Elected
Liberal–Conservative	John McDougald	2,709	✓
Conservative	Charles Hibbert Tupper	2,681	✓
Liberal	James William Carmichael	2,397	
Liberal	John A. Dawson	2,320	

1887 Canadian federal election: Pictou
Party	Candidate	Votes	Elected
Liberal–Conservative	John McDougald	3,413	✓
Conservative	Charles Hibbert Tupper	3,334	✓
Conservative	Adam Carr Bell	2,923	
Independent	John D. McLeod	2,739	

By-election on 18 June 1888 On Mr. Tupper being appointed Minister of Marine and Fisheries, 30 June 1888
Party	Candidate	Votes
Conservative	Charles Hibbert Tupper	acclaimed

1891 Canadian federal election: Pictou
Party	Candidate	Votes	Elected
Conservative	Charles Hibbert Tupper	3,433	✓
Liberal–Conservative	John McDougald	3,384	✓
Liberal	James A. Fraser	2,708	
Liberal	John Yorston	2,594	

1896 Canadian federal election: Pictou
Party	Candidate	Votes	Elected
Conservative	Charles Hibbert Tupper	3,577	✓
Conservative	Adam Carr Bell	3,503	✓
Liberal	Edward Mortimer Macdonald	3,349	
Liberal	James William Carmichael	3,337	

1900 Canadian federal election: Pictou
Party	Candidate	Votes	Elected
Conservative	Charles Hibbert Tupper	3,624	✓
Conservative	Adam Carr Bell	3,615	✓
Liberal	Edward Mortimer Macdonald	3,523	
Liberal	James Drummond McGregor	3,438	
