= John William Ritchie =

Canadian Father of Confederation (1808–1890)

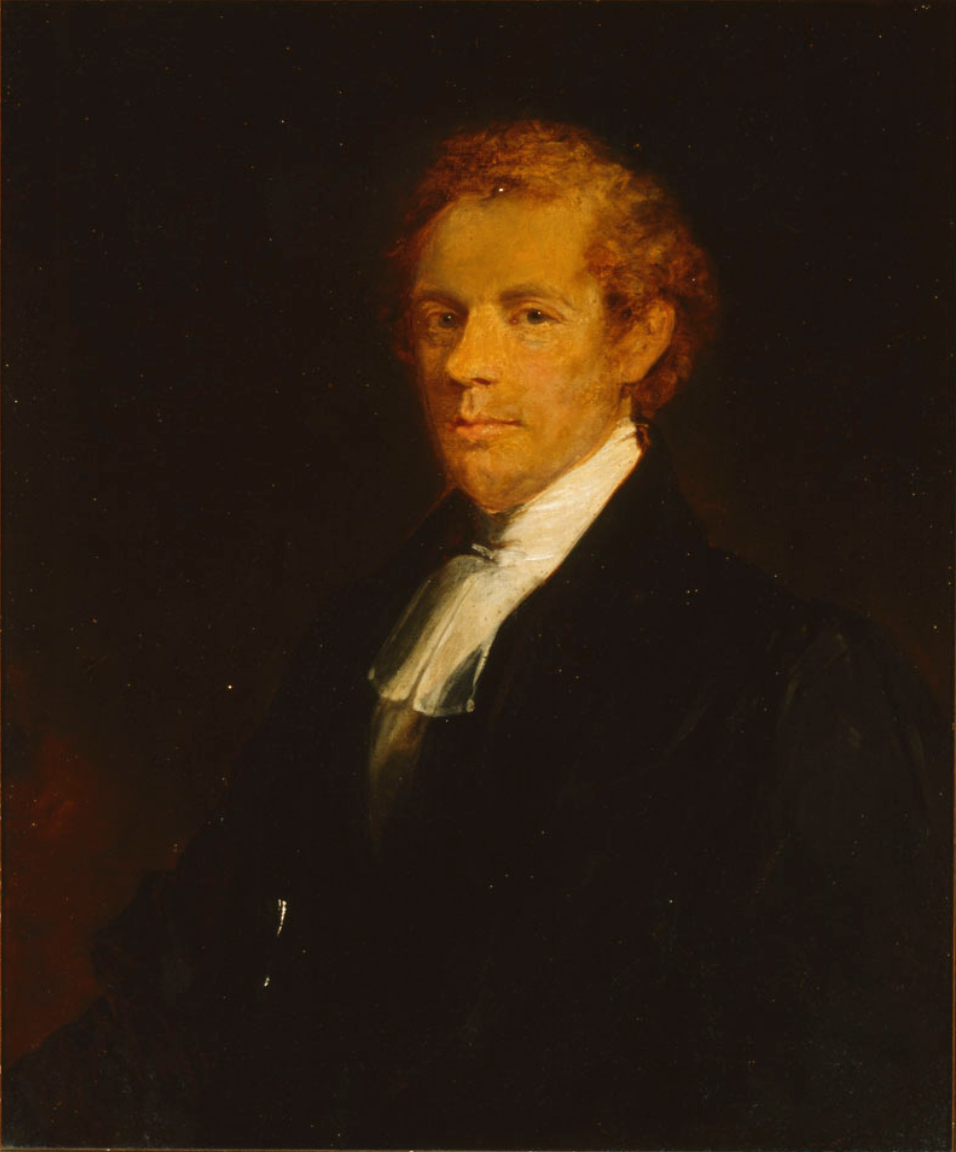
John William Ritchie by William Valentine (painter)

John William Ritchie (March 26, 1808 – December 13 or 18, 1890) was a Canadian lawyer and politician from Annapolis Royal, Nova Scotia who is one of the Fathers of Confederation.

Appointed to the Nova Scotia legislative council as Solicitor General in 1864, he was a delegate to the London Conference on Canadian Confederation and as such is considered one of the Fathers of Confederation. Appointed to the Senate of Canada in 1867, he was a judge of the Supreme Court of Nova Scotia from 1873 to 1882. His younger brother, William Johnstone Ritchie, was Chief Justice of Canada. His daughter was Eliza Ritchie.

Ritchie died at his estate in the Northwest Arm of Halifax and is buried at St. John's Cemetery.

== Early life and education ==
John William Ritchie was born in Annapolis Royal, Nova Scotia, on March 26, 1808. His father, Thomas Ritchie, was a lawyer, judge, and politician; his mother was named Elizabeth Wildman Johnston. Ritchie was likely educated in Annapolis Royal, at Ichabod Corbett's school. Instead of going to college, he received at-home tutoring. Ritchie later studied law with his uncle, James William Johnston, in Halifax during the mid-1820s. In January 1831, he became an attorney; the following year, he became a barrister. Ritchie pursued further studies when his first decade of practice proved unsuccessful.

== Gallery ==
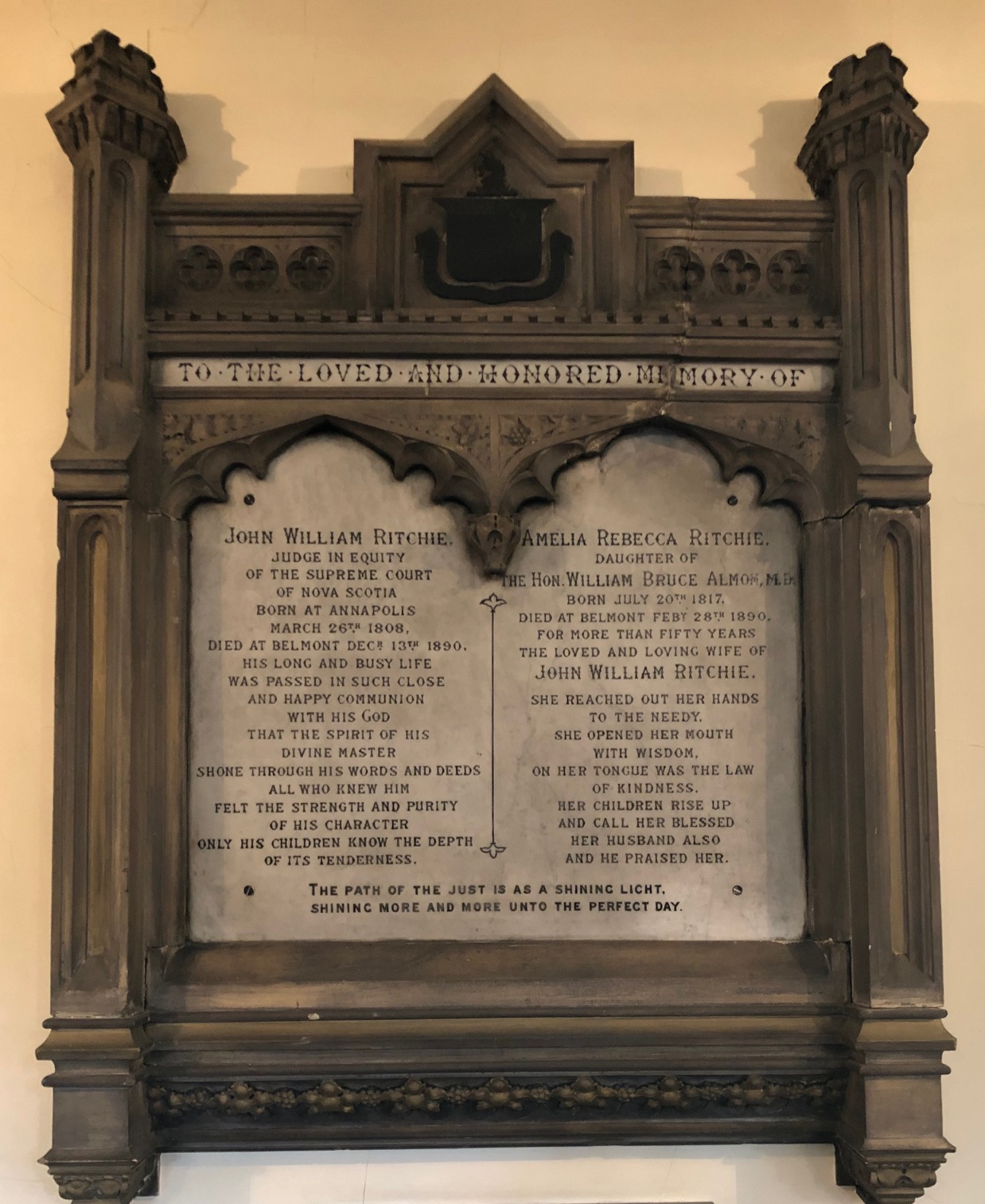
John William Ritchie, St. Paul's Church (Halifax)

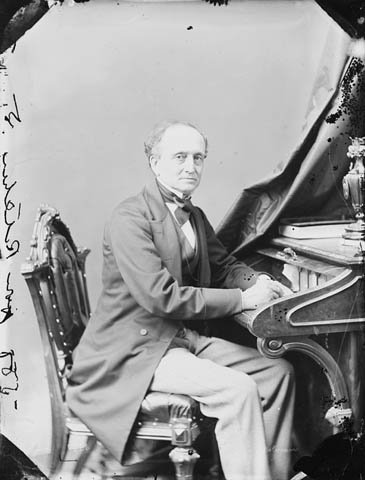
Hon. John William Ritchie, Q.C. (Senator), April 1868

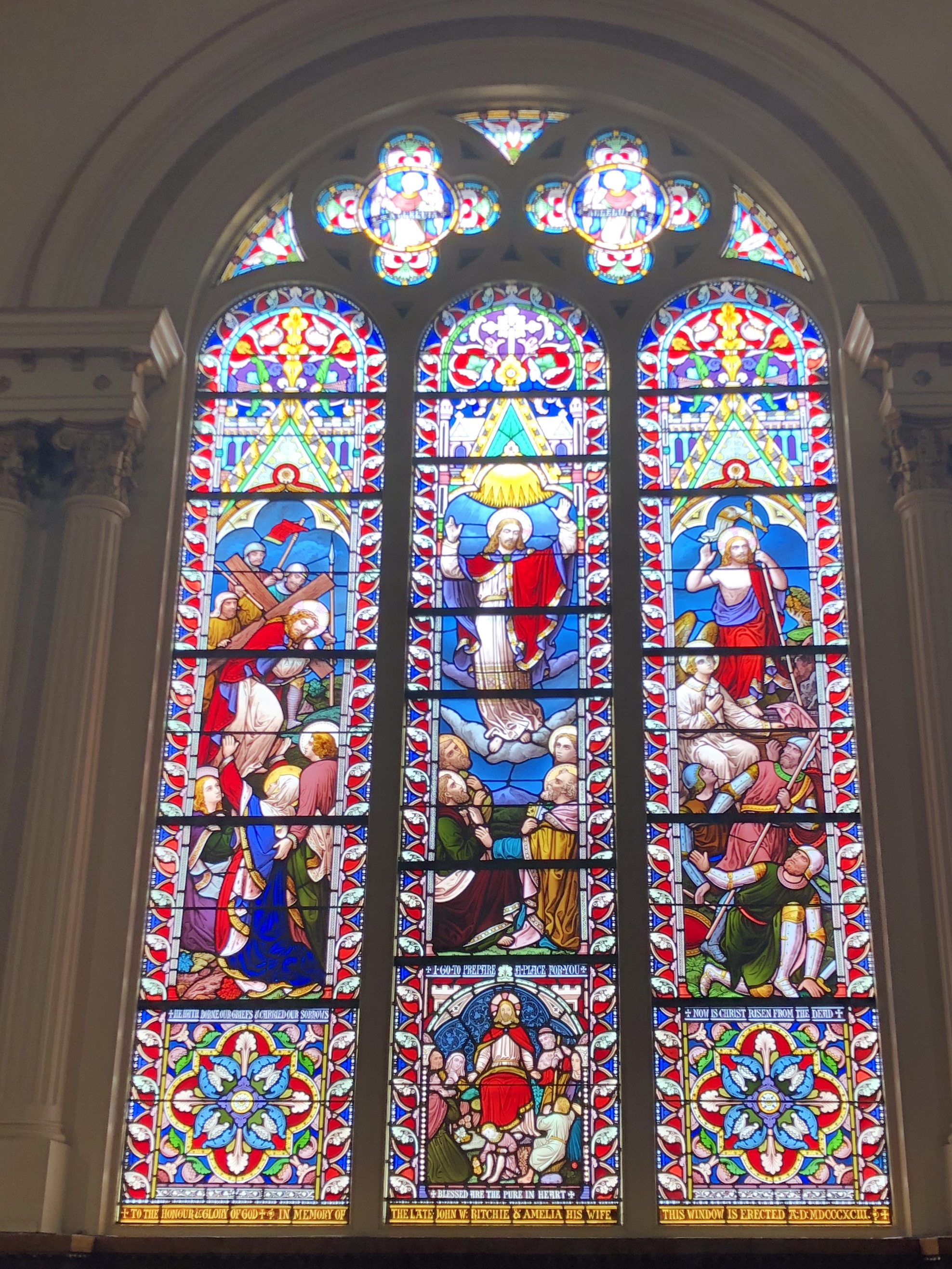
John Ritchie window, St. Paul's church
