= Charles Tupper =

Father of Confederation, Prime Minister of Canada in 1896

The Right Honourable Sir Charles Tupper PC (Can) Bt GCMG CB PC
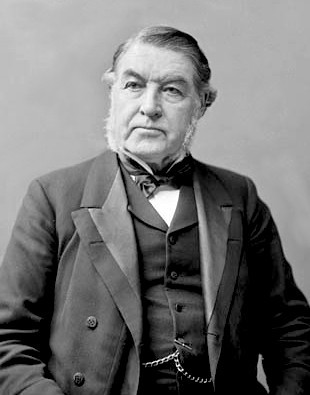
- Tupper in 1896

6th Prime Minister of Canada
- In office May 1 – July 8, 1896
- Monarch: Victoria
- Governor General: The Earl of Aberdeen
- Preceded by: Mackenzie Bowell
- Succeeded by: Wilfrid Laurier

Leader of the Opposition
- In office July 11, 1896 – February 5, 1901
- Preceded by: Wilfrid Laurier
- Succeeded by: Robert Borden

Secretary of State for Canada
- In office January 15 – July 8, 1896
- Prime Minister: Mackenzie Bowell; Himself (after May 1)
- Preceded by: Walter Humphries Montague
- Succeeded by: Richard William Scott

Canadian High Commissioner to the United Kingdom
- In office May 30, 1883 – January 15, 1896
- Prime Minister: John A. Macdonald; John Abbott; John Sparrow David Thompson; Mackenzie Bowell
- Preceded by: Alexander Tilloch Galt
- Succeeded by: Donald Smith

Minister of Finance and Receiver General
- In office January 27, 1887 – May 22, 1888
- Prime Minister: John A. Macdonald
- Preceded by: Archibald McLelan
- Succeeded by: George Eulas Foster

Member of Parliament for Cape Breton
- In office 1896–1900
- Preceded by: David MacKeen
- Succeeded by: Alexander Johnston

Member of Parliament for Cumberland
- In office 1887–1888
- Preceded by: Charles James Townshend
- Succeeded by: Arthur Rupert Dickey
- In office September 20, 1867 – May 1884
- Preceded by: New Constituency
- Succeeded by: Charles James Townshend

Premier of Nova Scotia
- In office May 11, 1864 – July 3, 1867
- Lieutenant Governor: Charles Hastings Doyle; Richard Graves MacDonnell; William Williams
- Preceded by: James William Johnston
- Succeeded by: Hiram Blanchard

Personal details
- Born: Charles Tupper, Jr. July 2, 1821 Amherst, Nova Scotia
- Died: October 30, 1915 (aged 94) Bexleyheath, England
- Resting place: St. John's Cemetery, Halifax, Nova Scotia
- Citizenship: British subject
- Party: Conservative
- Spouse: Frances Morse (m. 1846; died 1912)
- Children: 6, including: Charles Hibbert Tupper; William Johnston Tupper
- Education: University of Edinburgh Medical School (1843)
- Profession: Physician
- Awards: Order of St Michael and St George

Sir Charles Tupper, 1st Baronet (July 2, 1821 – October 30, 1915), was a Canadian Father of Confederation who served as the sixth prime minister of Canada from May 1 to July 8, 1896. As the premier of Nova Scotia from 1864 to 1867, he led Nova Scotia into Confederation. He briefly served as the Canadian prime minister, from seven days after parliament had been dissolved, until he was dismissed by the governor general on July 8, 1896, following his party's loss in the 1896 Canadian federal election. He is the only medical doctor to have ever held the office of prime minister of Canada, and his 69-day tenure as prime minister is the shortest in Canadian history.

Tupper was born in Amherst, Nova Scotia, to the Rev. Charles Tupper and Miriam Lockhart. He was educated at Horton Academy, Wolfville, Nova Scotia, and studied medicine at the University of Edinburgh Medical School, graduating MD in 1843. By the age of 22 he had handled 116 obstetric cases. He practiced medicine periodically throughout his political career (and served as the first president of the Canadian Medical Association). He entered Nova Scotian politics in 1855 as a protégé of James William Johnston. During Johnston's tenure as premier of Nova Scotia in 1857–1859 and 1863–1864, Tupper served as provincial secretary. Tupper replaced Johnston as premier in 1864. As premier, he established public education in Nova Scotia and expanded Nova Scotia's railway network in order to promote industry.

By 1860, Tupper supported a union of all the colonies of British North America. Believing that immediate union of all the colonies was impossible, in 1864, he proposed a Maritime Union. However, representatives of the Province of Canada asked to be allowed to attend the meeting in Charlottetown scheduled to discuss Maritime Union in order to present a proposal for a wider union, and the Charlottetown Conference thus became the first of the three conferences that secured Canadian Confederation. Tupper also represented Nova Scotia at the other two conferences, the Quebec Conference (1864) and the London Conference of 1866. In Nova Scotia, Tupper organized a Confederation Party to combat the activities of the Anti-Confederation Party organized by Joseph Howe and successfully led Nova Scotia into Confederation.

Following the passage of the British North America Act in 1867, Tupper resigned as premier of Nova Scotia and began a career in federal politics. He held multiple cabinet positions under Prime Minister John A. Macdonald, including President of the Queen's Privy Council for Canada (1870–1872), Minister of Inland Revenue (1872–1873), Minister of Customs (1873–1874), Minister of Public Works (1878–1879), and Minister of Railways and Canals (1879–1884). Initially groomed as Macdonald's successor, Tupper had a falling-out with Macdonald, and by the early 1880s, he asked Macdonald to appoint him as Canadian High Commissioner to the United Kingdom. Tupper took up his post in London in 1883, and would remain High Commissioner until 1895, although in 1887–1888, he served as Minister of Finance without relinquishing the High Commissionership.

In 1895, the government of Mackenzie Bowell floundered over the Manitoba Schools Question; as a result, several leading members of the Conservative Party of Canada demanded the return of Tupper to serve as prime minister. Tupper accepted this invitation and returned to Canada, becoming prime minister in May 1896. Just before he was sworn in as prime minister, the 1896 federal election was called, in which his party lost to Wilfrid Laurier and the Liberals. Tupper served as leader of the Opposition from July 1896 until he resigned in February 1901, just months after his second defeat at the polls in 1900. He returned to London, England, where he lived until his death in 1915 and was buried back in Halifax, Nova Scotia. He was the last surviving Canadian father of Confederation. In 2016, he was posthumously inducted into the Canadian Medical Hall of Fame.

== Early life, 1821–1855 ==
Charles Tupper Jr. was born on July 2, 1821, in Amherst, Nova Scotia, to Charles Tupper Sr. and Miriam Lowe, née Lockhart. He was a descendant of Richard Warren, a Mayflower Pilgrim who signed the Mayflower Compact. Charles Tupper Sr. (1794–1881) was the co-pastor of the local Baptist church. He had been ordained as a Baptist minister in 1817, and was editor of Baptist Magazine 1832–1836. He was an accomplished Biblical scholar, and published Scriptural Baptism (Halifax, Nova Scotia, 1850) and Expository Notes on the Syriac Version of the Scriptures.

Beginning in 1837, at age 16, Tupper attended Horton Academy in Wolfville, Nova Scotia, where he learned Latin, Greek, and some French. After graduating in 1839, he spent a short time in New Brunswick working as a teacher, then moved to Windsor, Nova Scotia, to study medicine (1839–1840) with Dr. Ebenezer Fitch Harding. Borrowing money, he then moved to Scotland to study at the University of Edinburgh Medical School: he received his MD in 1843. During his time in Edinburgh, Tupper's commitment to his Baptist faith faltered, and he drank Scotch whisky for the first time.

Returning to Nova Scotia in 1846, he broke off an engagement that he had contracted at age 17 with the daughter of a wealthy Halifax merchant, and instead married Frances Morse (1826–1912), the granddaughter of Colonel Joseph Morse, a founder of Amherst, Nova Scotia. The Tuppers had three sons (Orin Stewart, Charles Hibbert, and William Johnston) and three daughters (Emma, Elizabeth Stewart (Lilly), and Sophy Almon). The Tupper children were raised in Frances's Anglican denomination and Charles and Frances regularly worshipped in an Anglican church, though on the campaign trail, Tupper often found time to visit Baptist meetinghouses.

Tupper set himself up as a physician in Amherst, Nova Scotia, and opened a drugstore.

== Early years in Nova Scotia politics, 1855–1864 ==
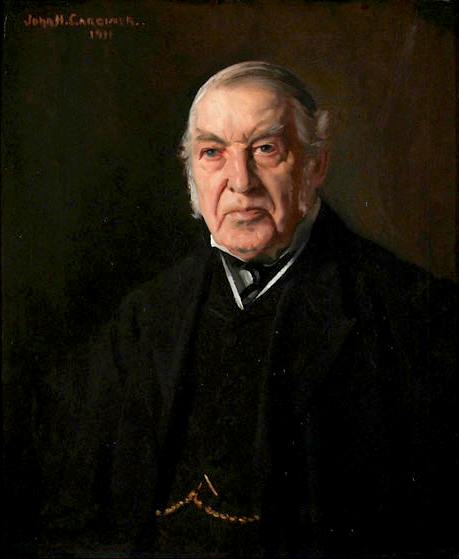
Charles Tupper 1911, by John Gardiner, Province House (Nova Scotia)

The leader of the Conservative Party of Nova Scotia, James William Johnston, a fellow Baptist and family friend of the Tuppers, encouraged Charles Tupper to enter politics. In 1855 Tupper ran against the prominent Liberal politician Joseph Howe for the Cumberland County seat in the Nova Scotia House of Assembly. Joseph Howe would be Tupper's political opponent several times in years to come.

Although Tupper won his seat, the 1855 election was an overall disaster for the Nova Scotia Conservatives, with the Liberals, led by William Young, winning a large majority. Young consequently became Premier of Nova Scotia.

At a caucus meeting in January 1856, Tupper recommended a new direction for the Conservative party: they should begin actively courting Nova Scotia's Roman Catholic minority and should eagerly embrace railroad construction. Having just led his party into a disastrous election campaign, Johnston decided to basically cede control of the party to Tupper, though Johnston remained the party's leader. During 1856 Tupper led Conservative attacks on the government, leading Joseph Howe to dub Tupper "the wicked wasp of Cumberland". In early 1857 Tupper convinced a number of Roman Catholic Liberal members to cross the floor to join the Conservatives, reducing Young's government to the status of a minority government. As a result, Young was forced to resign in February 1857, and the Conservatives formed a government with Johnston as premier. Tupper became the provincial secretary.

In Tupper's first speech to the House of Assembly as provincial secretary, he set forth an ambitious plan of railroad construction. Tupper had thus embarked on the major theme of his political life: that Nova Scotians (and later Canadians) should downplay their ethnic and religious differences, focusing instead on developing the land's natural resources. He argued that with Nova Scotia's "inexhaustible mines", it could become "a vast manufacturing mart" for the east coast of North America. He quickly persuaded Johnston to end the General Mining Association's monopoly over Nova Scotia minerals.

In June 1857, Tupper initiated discussions with New Brunswick and the Province of Canada concerning an intercolonial railway. He traveled to London in 1858 to attempt to secure imperial backing for this project. During these discussions, Tupper realized that Canadians were more interested in discussing federal union, while the British (with the Earl of Derby in his second term as Prime Minister) were too absorbed in their own immediate interests. As such, nothing came of the 1858 discussions for an intercolonial railway.

Sectarian conflict played a major role in the May 1859 elections, with Catholics largely supporting the Conservatives and Protestants shifting toward the Liberals. Tupper barely retained his seat. The Conservatives were barely re-elected and lost a confidence vote later that year. Johnston asked the Governor of Nova Scotia, Lord Mulgrave, for dissolution, but Mulgrave refused and invited William Young to form a government. Tupper was outraged and petitioned the British government, asking them to recall Mulgrave.

For the next three years, Tupper was ferocious in his denunciations of the Liberal government, first Young, and then Joseph Howe, who succeeded Young in 1860. This came to a head in 1863 when the Liberals introduced legislation to restrict the Nova Scotia franchise, a move which Johnston and Tupper successfully blocked. Tupper continued practicing medicine during this period. He established a successful medical practice in Halifax, rising to become the city medical officer. In 1863 he was elected president of the Medical Society of Nova Scotia.

In the June 1863 election, the Conservatives campaigned on a platform of railroad construction and expanded access to public education. The Conservatives won a large majority, taking 44 of the House of Assembly's 55 seats. Johnston resumed his duties as premier and Tupper again became provincial secretary. As a further sign of the Conservatives' commitment to non-sectarianism, in 1863, after a 20-year hiatus, Dalhousie College was re-opened as a non-denominational institution of higher learning. Johnston retired from politics in May 1864 when he was appointed as a judge, and Tupper was chosen as his successor as premier of Nova Scotia.

== Premier of Nova Scotia, 1864–1867 ==
Tupper introduced ambitious education legislation in 1864 creating a system of state-subsidized common schools. In 1865 he introduced a bill providing for compulsory local taxation to fund these schools. Although these public schools were non-denominational (which resulted in Protestants sharply criticizing Tupper), they did include a program of Christian education. However, many Protestants, particularly fellow Baptists, felt that Tupper had sold them out. To regain their trust he appointed Baptist educator Theodore Harding Rand as Nova Scotia's first superintendent of education. This raised concern among Catholics, led by Thomas-Louis Connolly, Archbishop of Halifax, who demanded state-funded Catholic schools. Tupper reached a compromise with Archbishop Connolly whereby Catholic-run schools could receive public funding, so long as they provided their religious instruction after hours.

Making good on his promise for expanded railroad construction, in 1864 Tupper appointed Sandford Fleming as the chief engineer of the Nova Scotia Railway in order to expand the line from Truro to Pictou Landing. In January 1866 he awarded Fleming a contract to complete the line after local contractors proved too slow. Though this decision was controversial, it did result in the line's being completed by May 1867. A second proposed line, from Annapolis Royal to Windsor initially faltered, but was eventually completed in 1869 by the privately owned Windsor & Annapolis Railway.

=== Tupper's role in securing Canadian Confederation ===
In the run-up to the 1859 Nova Scotia election, Tupper had been unwilling to commit to the idea of a union with the other British North American colonies. By 1860, however, he had reconsidered his position. Tupper outlined his changed position in a lecture delivered at Saint John, New Brunswick, entitled "The Political Condition of British North America". The title of the lecture was a homage to Lord Durham's 1838 Report on the Affairs of British North America and assessed the condition of British North America in the two decades following Lord Durham's famous report. Although Tupper was interested in the potential economic consequences of a union with the other colonies, the bulk of his lecture addressed the place of British North America within the wider British Empire. Having been convinced by his 1858 trip to London that British politicians were unwilling to pay attention to small colonies such as Nova Scotia, Tupper argued that Nova Scotia and the other Maritime colonies "could never hope to occupy a position of influence or importance except in connection with their larger sister Canada". Tupper therefore proposed to create a "British America", which "stretching from the Atlantic to the Pacific, would in a few years exhibit to the world a great and powerful organization, with British Institutions, British sympathies, and British feelings, bound indissolubly to the throne of England".

==== Charlottetown Conference, September 1864 ====
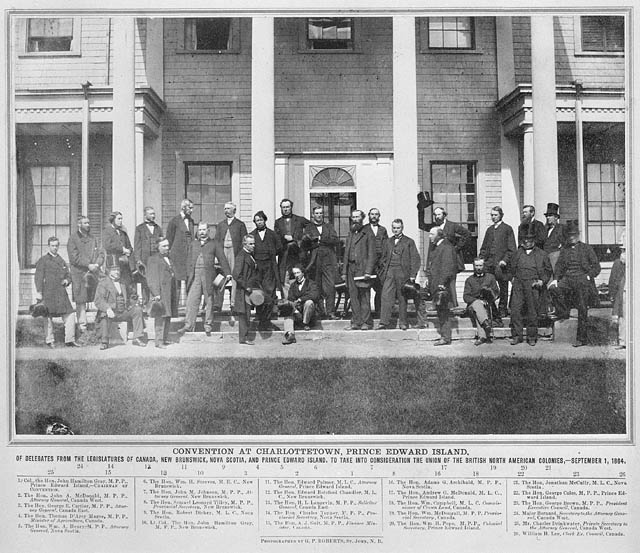
Tupper and other delegates of the Charlottetown Conference on the steps of Government House, September 1864

With the outbreak of the American Civil War in 1861, Tupper worried that a victorious North would turn northward and conquer the British North American provinces. This caused him to redouble his commitment to union, which he now saw as essential to protecting the British colonies against American aggression. Since he thought that full union among the British North American colonies would be unachievable for many years, on March 28, 1864, Tupper instead proposed a Maritime Union which would unite the Maritime provinces in advance of a projected future union with the Province of Canada. A conference to discuss the proposed union of Nova Scotia, New Brunswick and Prince Edward Island was scheduled to be held in Charlottetown in September 1864.

Tupper was pleasantly surprised when the Premier of the Province of Canada, John A. Macdonald, asked to be allowed to attend the Charlottetown Conference. The conference, which was co-chaired by Tupper and New Brunswick Premier Samuel Leonard Tilley, welcomed the Canadian delegation and asked them to join the conference. The conference proved to be a smashing success, and resulted in an agreement-in-principle to form a union of the four colonies.

==== Quebec Conference, October 1864 ====
The Quebec Conference was held on October 10, as a follow-up to the Charlottetown Conference, with Newfoundland only attending to observe. Tupper headed the Nova Scotia delegation to the Quebec Conference. He supported a legislative union of the colonies (which would mean that there would be only one legislature for the united colonies). However, the French Canadian delegates to the conference, notably George-Étienne Cartier and Hector-Louis Langevin, strongly opposed the idea of a legislative union. Tupper threw his weight behind Macdonald's proposal for a federal union, which would see each colony retain its own legislature, with a central legislature in charge of common interests. Tupper argued in favour of a strong central government as a second best to a pure legislative union. He felt, however, that the local legislatures should retain the ability to levy duties on their natural resources.

Concerned that a united legislature would be dominated by the Province of Canada, Tupper pushed for regional representation in the upper house of the confederated colonies (a goal which would be achieved in the makeup of the Senate of Canada).

On the topic of which level of government would control customs in the union, Tupper ultimately agreed to accept the formula by which the federal government controlled customs in exchange for an annual subsidy of 80 cents a year for each Nova Scotian. This deal was ultimately not good for Nova Scotia, which had historically received most of its government revenue from customs, and as a result, Nova Scotia entered Confederation with a deficit.

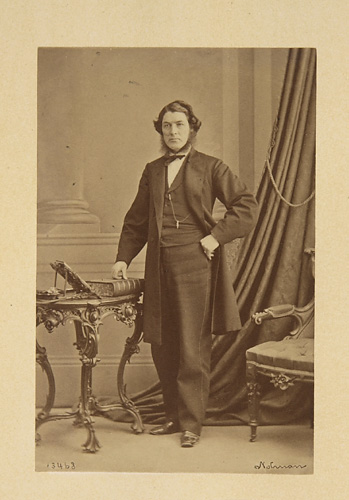
Tupper in 1865

==== Aftermath of the Quebec Conference ====
Although Tupper had given up much at the Quebec Conference, he thought that he would be able to convince Nova Scotians that the deal he negotiated was in some good for Nova Scotia. He was therefore surprised when the deal he had negotiated at Quebec was roundly criticized by Nova Scotians: the Opposition Leader Adams George Archibald was the only member of the Liberal caucus to support Confederation. Former premier Joseph Howe now organized an Anti-Confederation Party and anti-Confederation sentiments were so strong that Tupper decided to postpone a vote of the legislature on the question of Confederation for a full year. Tupper now organized supporters of Confederation into a Confederation Party to push for the union.

In April 1866, Tupper secured a motion of the Nova Scotia legislature in favour of union by promising that he would renegotiate the Seventy-two Resolutions at the upcoming conference in London.

==== London Conference, 1866 ====
Joseph Howe had begun a pamphlet campaign in the UK to turn British public opinion against the proposed union. Therefore, when Tupper arrived in the UK, he immediately initiated a campaign of pamphlets and letters to the editor designed to refute Howe's assertions.

Although Tupper did attempt to renegotiate the 72 Resolutions as he had promised, he was ineffective in securing any major changes. The only major change agreed to at the London Conference arguably did not benefit Nova Scotia – responsibility for the fisheries, which was going to be a joint federal-provincial responsibility under the Quebec agreement, became solely a federal concern.

==== The final push for Confederation ====
Following passage of the British North America Act in the wake of the London Conference, Tupper returned to Nova Scotia to undertake preparations for the union, which came into existence on July 1, 1867, and on July 4, Tupper turned over responsibility for the government of Nova Scotia to Hiram Blanchard.

In honour of the role he had played in securing Confederation, Tupper was made a Companion in The Most Honourable Order of the Bath in 1867. He was now entitled to use the postnomial letters "CB".

== Career in the Parliament of Canada, 1867–1884 ==
=== Fighting the Anti-Confederates, 1867–1869 ===
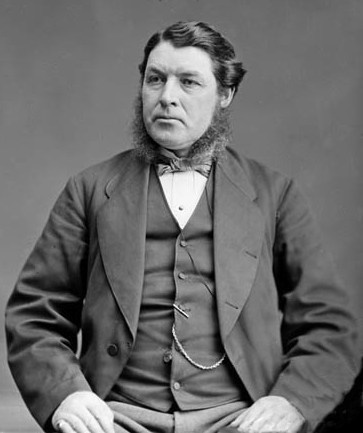
Tupper in April 1870

The first elections for the new House of Commons of Canada were held in August–September 1867. Tupper ran as a member for the new federal riding of Cumberland and won his seat. However, he was the only pro-Confederation candidate to win a seat from Nova Scotia in the 1st Canadian Parliament, with Joseph Howe and the Anti-Confederates winning every other seat. As an ally of John A. Macdonald and the Liberal-Conservative Party, it was widely believed that Tupper would have a place in the first Cabinet of Canada. However, when Macdonald ran into difficulties in organizing this cabinet, Tupper stepped aside in favour of Edward Kenny. Instead, Tupper set up a medical practice in Ottawa and was elected as the first president of the new Canadian Medical Association, a position he held until 1870.

In the November 1867 provincial elections in Nova Scotia, the pro-Confederation Hiram Blanchard was defeated by the leader of the Anti-Confederation Party, William Annand. Given the unpopularity of Confederation within Nova Scotia, Joseph Howe traveled to London in 1868 to attempt to persuade the British government (headed by the Earl of Derby, and then after February 1868 by Benjamin Disraeli) to allow Nova Scotia to secede from Confederation. Tupper followed Howe to London where he successfully lobbied British politicians against allowing Nova Scotia to secede.

Following his victory in London, Tupper proposed a reconciliation with Howe: in exchange for Howe's agreeing to stop fighting against the union, Tupper and Howe would be allies in the fight to protect Nova Scotia's interests within Confederation. Howe agreed to Tupper's proposal and in January 1869 entered the Canadian cabinet as President of the Queen's Privy Council for Canada. With the outbreak of the Red River Rebellion in 1869, Tupper was distressed to find that his daughter Emma's husband was being held hostage by Louis Riel and the rebels. He rushed to the northwest to rescue his son-in-law.

=== Privy Council president and other Ministry roles, 1870–1874 ===
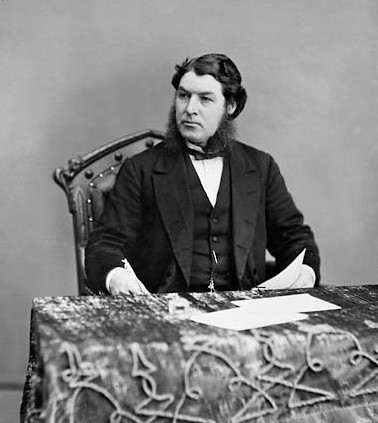
Tupper in November 1871

When Howe's health declined the next year, Tupper finally entered the 1st Canadian Ministry by becoming Privy Council president in June 1870. The next year was dominated by a dispute with the United States regarding US access to the Atlantic fisheries. Tupper thought that the British should restrict American access to these fisheries so that they could negotiate from a position of strength. When Prime Minister Macdonald travelled to represent Canada's interests at the negotiations leading up to the Treaty of Washington (1871), Tupper served as Macdonald's liaison with the federal cabinet.

On January 19, 1872, Tupper's service as Privy Council president ended and he became Minister of Inland Revenue. Tupper led the Nova Scotia campaign for the Liberal-Conservative party during the Canadian federal election of 1872. His efforts paid off when Nova Scotia returned not a single Anti-Confederate Member of Parliament to the 2nd Canadian Parliament, and 20 of Nova Scotia's 21 MPs were Liberal-Conservatives. (The Liberal-Conservative Party changed its name to the Conservative Party in 1873.)

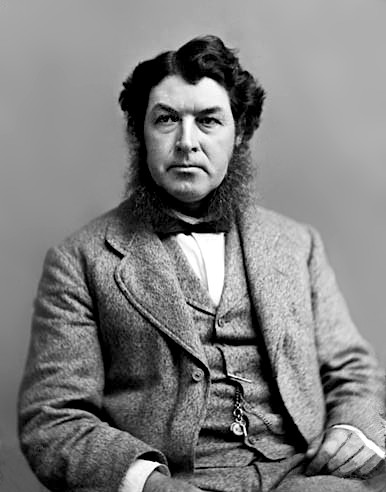
Tupper in August 1873

In February 1873, Tupper was shifted from Inland Revenue to become Minister of Customs, and in this position he was successful in having British weights and measures adopted as the uniform standard for the united colonies. He would not hold this post for long, however, as Macdonald's government was rocked by the Pacific Scandal throughout 1873. In November 1873, the 1st Canadian Ministry was forced to resign and was replaced by the 2nd Canadian Ministry headed by Liberal Alexander Mackenzie.

=== Years in Opposition, 1874–1878 ===
Tupper had not been involved in the Pacific Scandal, but he nevertheless continued to support Macdonald and his Conservative colleagues both before and after the 1874 election. The 1874 election was disastrous for those Conservatives, and in Nova Scotia, Tupper was one of only two Conservative MPs returned to the 3rd Canadian Parliament.

Though Macdonald stayed on as Conservative leader, Tupper now assumed a more prominent role in the Conservative Party and was widely seen as Macdonald's heir apparent. He led Conservative attacks on the Mackenzie government throughout the 3rd Parliament. The Mackenzie government attempted to negotiate a new free trade agreement with the United States to replace the Canadian–American Reciprocity Treaty which the U.S. had abrogated in 1864. When Mackenzie proved unable to achieve reciprocity, Tupper began shifting toward protectionism and became a proponent of the National Policy which became a part of the Conservative platform in 1876. The sincerity of Tupper's conversion to the protectionist cause was doubted at the time, however: according to one apocryphal story, when Tupper came to the 1876 debate on Finance Minister Richard John Cartwright's budget, he was prepared to advocate free trade if Cartwright had announced that the Liberals had shifted their position and were now supporting protectionism.

Tupper was also deeply critical of Mackenzie's approach to railways, arguing that completion of the Canadian Pacific Railway, which would link British Columbia (which entered Confederation in 1871) with the rest of Canada, should be a stronger government priority than it was for Mackenzie. This position also became an integral part of the Conservative platform. As on previous occasions when he was not in cabinet, Tupper was active in practicing medicine during the 1874–78 stint in Opposition, though he was dedicating less and less of his time to medicine during this period. Tupper was a councillor of the Oxford Military College in Cowley and Oxford, Oxfordshire from 1876 to 1896.

=== Minister of Public Works, 1878–1879 ===
During the 1878 election Tupper again led the Conservative campaign in Nova Scotia. The Conservatives under Macdonald won a resounding majority in the election, in the process capturing 16 of Nova Scotia's 21 seats in the 4th Canadian Parliament.

With the formation of the 3rd Canadian Ministry on October 17, 1878, Tupper became Minister of Public Works. His top priority was completion of the Canadian Pacific Railway, which he saw as "an Imperial Highway across the Continent of America entirely on British soil". This marked a shift in Tupper's position: although he had long argued that completion of the railway should be a major government priority, while Tupper was in Opposition, he argued that the railway should be privately constructed; he now argued that the railway ought to be completed as a public work, partly because he believed that the private sector could not complete the railroad given the recession which gripped the country throughout the 1870s.

=== Minister of Railways and Canals, 1879–1884 ===
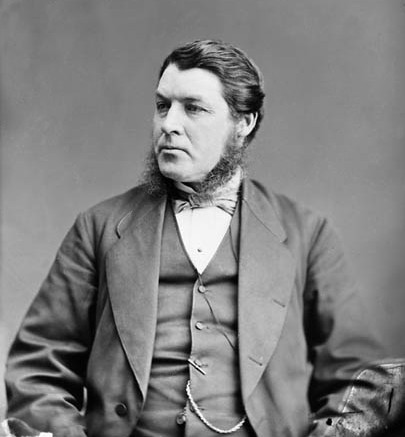
Tupper in September 1881

In May 1879, Macdonald decided that completion of the railway was such a priority that he created a new ministry to focus on railways and canals, and Tupper became Canada's first Minister of Railways and Canals. Tupper's motto as Minister of Railways and Canals was "Develop our resources". He stated "I have always supposed that the great object, in every country, and especially in a new country, was to draw as [many] capitalists into it as possible." Tupper traveled to London in summer 1879 to attempt to persuade the British government (then headed by the Earl of Beaconsfield in his second term as prime minister) to guarantee a bond sale to be used to construct the railway. He was not successful, though he did manage to purchase 50,000 tons of steel rails at a bargain price. Tupper's old friend Sandford Fleming oversaw the railway construction, but his inability to keep costs down led to political controversy, and Tupper was forced to remove Fleming as chief engineer in May 1880.

1879 also saw Tupper made a Knight Commander of the Order of St Michael and St George, and thus entitled to use the postnominal letters "KCMG". In 1880, George Stephen approached Tupper on behalf of a syndicate and asked to be allowed to take over construction of the railway. Convinced that Stephen's syndicate was up to the task, Tupper convinced the cabinet to back the plan at a meeting in June 1880 and, together with Macdonald, negotiated a contract with the syndicate in October. The syndicate successfully created the Canadian Pacific Railway in February 1881 and assumed construction of the railway shortly thereafter. In the following years, Tupper was a vocal supporter of the CPR during its competition with the Grand Trunk Railway. In December 1883 he worked out a rescue plan for the CPR after it faced financial difficulties and persuaded his party and Parliament to accept the plan.

In addition to his support for completion of the CPR, Tupper also actively managed the existing railways in the colonies. Shortly after becoming minister in 1879, he forced the Intercolonial Railway to lower its freight rates, which had been a major grievance of Maritime business interests. He then forced the Grand Trunk Railway to sell its Rivière-du-Loup line to the Intercolonial Railway to complete a link between Halifax and the St. Lawrence Seaway. He also refused to give the CPR running rights over the Intercolonial Railway, though he did convince the CPR to build the Short Line from Halifax to Saint John. In terms of canals, Tupper's time as Minister of Railways and Canals is notable for large expenditures on widening the Welland Canal and deepening the Saint Lawrence Seaway.

==== Deterioration of relationship with Macdonald and appointment as High Commissioner ====
A rift developed between Tupper and Macdonald in 1879 over Sandford Fleming, whom Tupper supported but whom Macdonald wanted removed as Chief Engineer of the CPR. This rift was partially healed and Tupper and Macdonald managed to work together during the negotiations with George Stephen's syndicate in 1880, but the men were no longer close, and Tupper no longer seemed to be Macdonald's heir apparent. By early 1881 Tupper had determined that he should leave the cabinet. In March 1881 he asked Macdonald to appoint him as Canada's High Commissioner in London. Macdonald initially refused, and Alexander Tilloch Galt retained the high commissioner's post.

During the 1882 election, Tupper campaigned only in Nova Scotia (he normally campaigned throughout the country): he was again successful, with the Conservatives winning 14 of Nova Scotia's 21 seats in the 5th Canadian Parliament. The 1882 election was personally significant for Tupper because it saw his son, Charles Hibbert Tupper, elected as MP for Pictou.

== Canadian High Commissioner to the United Kingdom, 1883–1895 ==
=== Early years as High Commissioner, 1883–1887 ===
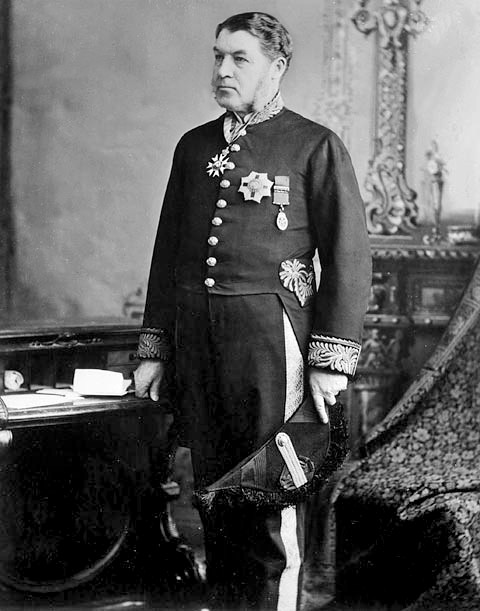
Tupper circa 1883

Tupper remained committed to leaving Ottawa, however, and in May 1883, he moved to London to become unpaid High Commissioner, though he did not surrender his ministerial position at the time. However, he soon faced criticism that the two posts were incompatible, and in May 1884 he resigned from cabinet and the House of Commons and became full-time paid High Commissioner. During his time as High Commissioner, Tupper vigorously defended Canada's rights. Although he was not a full plenipotentiary, he represented Canada at a Paris conference in 1883, where he openly disagreed with the British delegation; and in 1884 he was allowed to conduct negotiations for a Canadian commercial treaty with Spain. Tupper was concerned with promoting immigration to Canada and made several tours of various countries in Europe to encourage their citizens to move to Canada. A report in 1883 acknowledges the work of Charles Tupper:

As directing emigration from the United Kingdom and also the Continent, his work has been greatly valuable; and especially in reference to the arrangements made by him on the Continent and in Ireland. The High Commissioner for Canada, Sir Charles Tupper, has been aided during the past year by the same Emigration Agents of the Department in the United Kingdom as in 1882, namely, Mr. John Dyke, Liverpool; Mr. Thomas Grahame, Glasgow; Mr. Charles Foy, Belfast; Mr. Thomas Connolly, Dublin, and Mr. J. W. Down, Bristol. On the European continent, Dr. Otto Hahn, of Reutlingen, has continued to act as Agent in Germany.

In 1883, Tupper convinced William Ewart Gladstone's government to exempt Canadian cattle from the general British ban on importing American cattle by demonstrating that Canadian cattle were free of disease. His other duties as High Commissioner included: putting Canadian exporters in contact with British importers; negotiating loans for the Canadian government and the CPR; helping to organize the Colonial and Indian Exhibition of 1886; arranging for a subsidy for the mail ship from Vancouver, British Columbia, to the Orient; and lobbying on behalf of a British-Pacific cable along the lines of the transatlantic telegraph cable and for a faster transatlantic steam ship. Tupper was present at the founding meeting of the Imperial Federation League in July 1884, where he argued against a resolution which said that the only options open to the British Empire were Imperial Federation or disintegration. Tupper believed that a form of limited federation was possible and desirable.

=== Interlude as Minister of Finance, 1887–1888 ===
1884 saw the election of Liberal William Stevens Fielding as Premier of Nova Scotia after Fielding campaigned on a platform of leading Nova Scotia out of Confederation. As such, throughout 1886, Macdonald begged Tupper to return to Canada to fight the Anti-Confederates. In January 1887 Tupper returned to Canada to rejoin the 3rd Canadian Ministry as Minister of Finance of Canada, while retaining his post as High Commissioner.

During the 1887 federal election, Tupper again presented the pro-Confederation argument to the people of Nova Scotia, and again the Conservatives won 14 of Nova Scotia's 21 seats in the 6th Canadian Parliament.

During his year as finance minister, Tupper retained the government's commitment to protectionism, even extending it to the iron and steel industry. By this time Tupper was convinced that Canada was ready to move on to its second stage of industrial development. In part, he held out the prospect of the development of a great iron industry as an inducement to keep Nova Scotia from seceding.

Tupper's unique position of being both Minister of Finance and High Commissioner to London served him well in an emerging crisis in American-Canadian relations: in 1885, the U.S. abrogated the fisheries clause of the Treaty of Washington (1871), and the Canadian government retaliated against American fishermen with a narrow reading of the Treaty of 1818. Acting as High Commissioner, Tupper pressured the British government (then led by Lord Salisbury) to stand firm in defending Canada's rights. The result was the appointment of a Joint Commission in 1887, with Tupper serving as one of the three British commissioners to negotiate with the Americans. Salisbury selected Joseph Chamberlain as one of the British commissioners. John Thompson served as the British delegation's legal counsel. During the negotiations, U.S. Secretary of State Thomas F. Bayard complained that "Mr. Chamberlain has yielded the control of the negotiations over to Charles Tupper, who subjects the questions to the demands of Canadian politics." The result of the negotiations was a treaty (the Treaty of Washington of 1888) that made such concessions to Canada that it was ultimately rejected by the American Senate in February 1888. However, although the treaty was rejected, the commission had managed to temporarily resolve the dispute.

Following the long conclusion of these negotiations, Tupper decided to return to London to become High-Commissioner full-time. Macdonald tried to persuade Tupper to stay in Ottawa: during the political crisis surrounding the 1885 North-West Rebellion, Macdonald had pledged to nominate Hector-Louis Langevin as his successor; Macdonald now told Tupper that he would break this promise and nominate Tupper as his successor. Tupper was not convinced, however, and resigned as Minister of Finance on May 23, 1888, and moved back to London.

=== Later years as High Commissioner, 1888–1895 ===
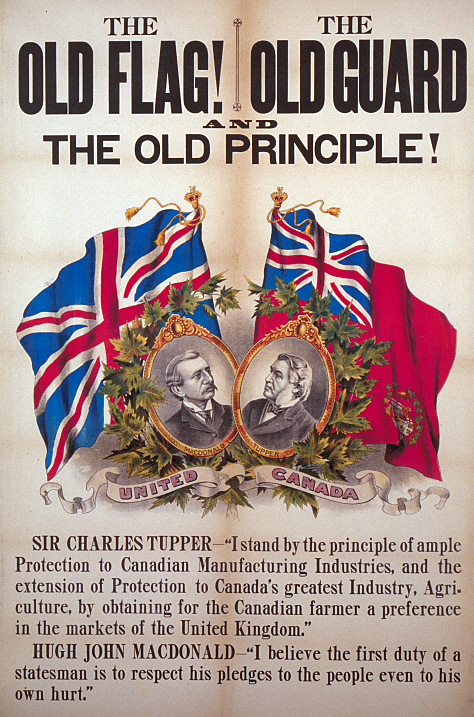
"The Old Flag! The Old Guard and the Old Principle!" Conservative Party election poster, with Charles Tupper and Hugh John Macdonald, during the 1891 election

For Tupper's work on the Joint Commission, Joseph Chamberlain arranged for Tupper to become a baronet of the United Kingdom, and the Tupper Baronetcy was created on September 13, 1888.

In 1889, tensions were high between the U.S. and Canada when the U.S. banned Canadians from engaging in the seal hunt in the Bering Sea as part of the ongoing Bering Sea Dispute between the U.S. and Britain. Tupper traveled to Washington, D.C., to represent Canadian interests during the negotiations and was something of an embarrassment to the British diplomats.

When, in 1890, the provincial secretary of Newfoundland, Robert Bond, negotiated a fisheries treaty with the U.S. that Tupper felt was not in Canada's interest, Tupper successfully persuaded the British government (then under Lord Salisbury's second term) to reject the treaty.

Tupper remained an active politician during his time as High Commissioner, which was controversial because diplomats are traditionally expected to be nonpartisan. (Tupper's successor as High Commissioner, Donald Smith would succeed in turning the high commissioner's office into a nonpartisan office.) As such, Tupper returned to Canada to campaign on behalf of the Conservatives' National Policy during the 1891 election.

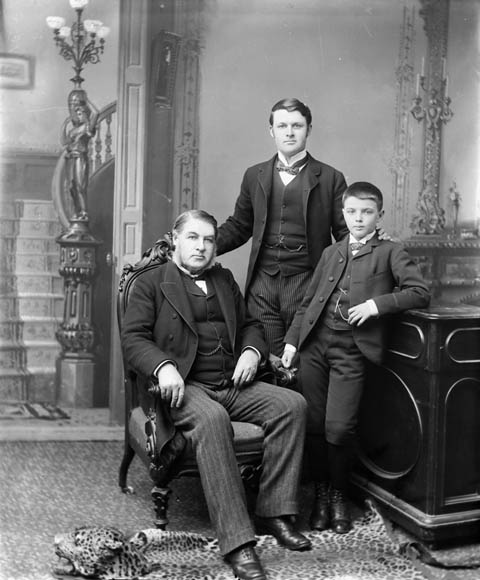
Charles Tupper with his son Charles Hibbert Tupper and his grandson, March 1891

Tupper continued to be active in the Imperial Federation League, though after 1887, the League was split over the issue of regular colonial contribution to imperial defense. As a result, the League was dissolved in 1893, for which some people blamed Tupper.

With respect to the British Empire, Tupper advocated a system of mutual preferential trading. In a series of articles in Nineteenth Century in 1891 and 1892, Tupper denounced the position that Canada should unilaterally reduce its tariff on British goods. Rather, he argued that any such tariff reduction should only come as part of a wider trade agreement in which tariffs on Canadian goods would also be reduced at the same time.

John A. Macdonald's death in 1891 opened the possibility of Tupper's replacing him as Prime Minister of Canada, but Tupper enjoyed life in London and decided against returning to Canada. He recommended that his son support John Thompson's prime ministerial bid.

== Tupper becomes prime minister, 1895–1896 ==
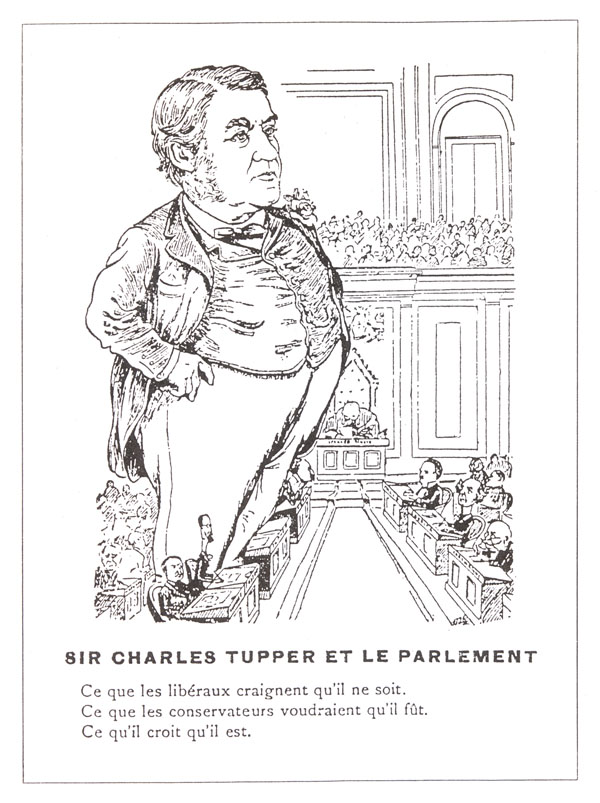
"Sir Charles Tupper et le parlement": political cartoon from February 1896

John Thompson died suddenly in office in December 1894. Many observers expected the Governor General of Canada, Lord Aberdeen, to invite Tupper to return to Canada to become prime minister. However, Lord Aberdeen disliked Tupper and instead invited Mackenzie Bowell to replace Thompson as prime minister. The greatest challenge facing Bowell as prime minister was the Manitoba Schools Question. The Conservative Party was bitterly divided on how to handle the Manitoba Schools Question, and as a result, on January 4, 1896, seven cabinet ministers resigned, demanding the return of Tupper. As a result, Bowell and Aberdeen were forced to invite Tupper to join the 6th Canadian Ministry and on January 15 Tupper became Secretary of State for Canada, with the understanding that he would become prime minister following the dissolution of the 7th Canadian Parliament.

Returning to Canada, Tupper was elected to the 7th Canadian Parliament as member for Cape Breton during a by-election held on February 4, 1896. At this point, Tupper succeeded George Foster as Leader of the Government in the House of Commons, though Bowell (a Senator) was still prime minister. Tupper's position on the Manitoba Schools Act was that French Catholics in Manitoba had been promised the right to separate state-funded French-language Catholic schools in the Manitoba Act of 1870. Thus, even though he personally opposed French-language Catholic schools in Manitoba, he believed that the government should stand by its promise and therefore oppose Dalton McCarthy's Manitoba Schools Act. He maintained this position even after the Manitoba Schools Act was upheld by the Judicial Committee of the Privy Council.

In 1895, the Judicial Committee of the Privy Council ruled that the Canadian federal government could pass remedial legislation to overrule the Manitoba Schools Act (see Disallowance and reservation). Therefore, in February 1896 Tupper introduced this remedial legislation in the House of Commons. The bill was filibustered by a combination of extreme Protestants led by McCarthy and Liberals led by Wilfrid Laurier. This filibuster resulted in Tupper's abandoning the bill and asking for a dissolution.

== Prime Minister, May–July 1896 ==
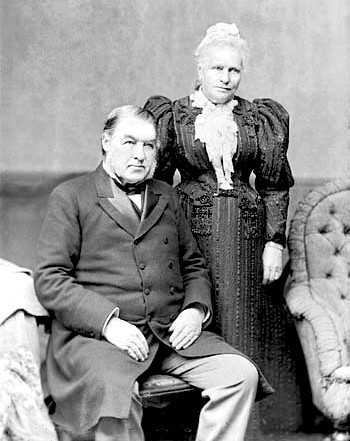
Sir Charles and Lady Tupper, October 1896

Parliament was dissolved on April 24, 1896, and the 7th Canadian Ministry with Tupper as prime minister was sworn in on May 1 making him one of only three prime ministers to not sit in Parliament while prime minister. Tupper remains the oldest person ever to become Canadian prime minister, at age 74.

Throughout the 1896 election campaign, Tupper argued that the real issue of the election was the future of Canadian industry and insisted that Conservatives needed to unite to defeat the Patrons of Industry. However, the Conservatives were so bitterly divided over the Manitoba Schools Question that wherever he spoke, he was faced with a barrage of criticism, most notably at a two-hour address he gave at Massey Hall in Toronto, which was constantly interrupted by the crowd.

Wilfrid Laurier, on the other hand, modified the traditional Liberal stance on free trade and embraced aspects of the National Policy.

In the end, the Conservatives won the most votes in the 1896 election (48.2 percent of the votes, in comparison to 41.4 percent for the Liberals). The Conservatives tallied about 10,000 more actual votes on election day across the country, but parties of that time often decided not to put up the money to run candidates and finance their campaigns. The Liberals only ran 192 candidates in the 213 ridings (the Conservatives ran 207); in Ontario, 17 seats had no Liberal candidate, as the Liberal Party endorsed several candidates of the Patrons of Industry, a farmer-labour movement. The Patrons won over 32,000 votes in Ontario and elected two members who subsequently caucused with the Liberal government. As well, two Liberal candidates in Quebec were elected by acclamation, and therefore received no actual votes. The Conservatives captured only about half of the seats in English Canada, while Laurier's Liberals won a landslide victory in Quebec, where Tupper's reputation as an ardent imperialist was a major handicap. Tupper had tried and failed to persuade Joseph-Adolphe Chapleau to return to active politics as his Quebec lieutenant.

Although Laurier had clearly won the election on June 24, Tupper initially refused to cede power, insisting that Laurier would be unable to form a government despite the Liberal Party's having won 55 percent of the seats in the House of Commons. However, when Tupper attempted to make appointments as prime minister, Lord Aberdeen refused to act on Tupper's advice. Tupper then resigned. Tupper maintained that Lord Aberdeen's actions were unconstitutional.

Tupper's 68 days are the shortest term of all prime ministers of Canada. His government never faced a Parliament.

His portrait, by Victor Albert Long, hangs in the Parliament Buildings.

== Leader of the Opposition, 1896–1900 ==
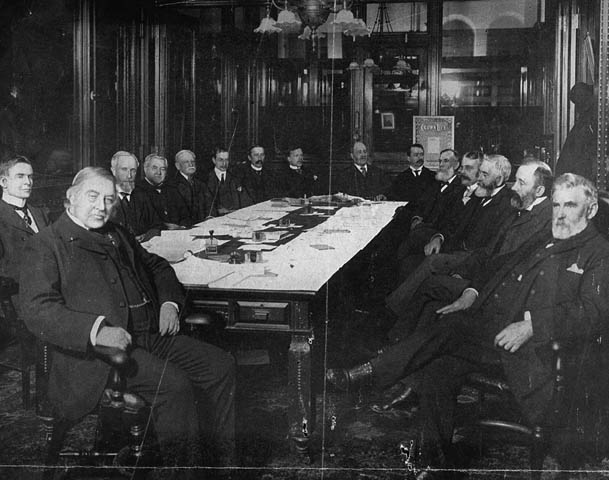
Tupper at a meeting of the directors of the Crown Life Insurance Company in Toronto, ca 1900

As Leader of the Opposition during the 8th Canadian Parliament, Tupper attempted to regain the loyalty of those Conservatives who had deserted the party over the Manitoba Schools Question. He played up loyalty to the British Empire. Tupper strongly supported Canadian participation in the Second Boer War, which broke out in 1899, and criticized Laurier for not doing enough to support Britain in the war.

The 1900 election saw the Conservatives pick up 17 Ontario seats in the 9th Canadian Parliament. This was a small consolation, however, Laurier's Liberals won a definitive majority and had a clear mandate for a second term. Worse for Tupper was the fact he had failed to carry his own seat, losing the Cape Breton seat to Liberal Alexander Johnston. In November 1900, two weeks after the election, Tupper stepped down as leader of the Conservative Party of Canada and Leader of the Opposition – the caucus chose as his successor fellow Nova Scotian Robert Laird Borden.

== Later years, 1901–1915 ==
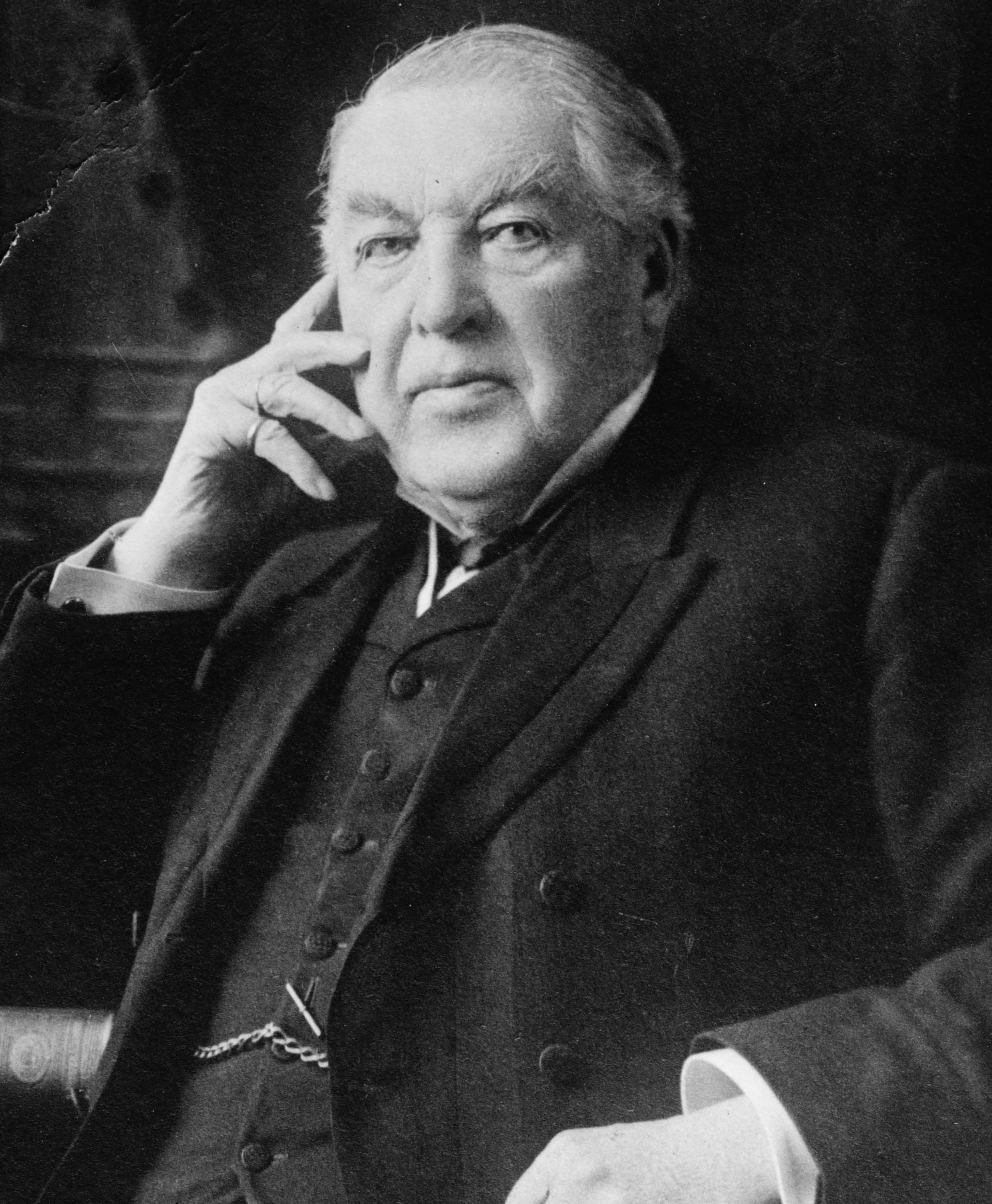
Tupper in 1910

Following his defeat in the 1900 election, Tupper and his wife settled with their daughter Emma in Bexleyheath in north-west Kent. He continued to make frequent trips to Canada to visit his sons Charles Hibbert Tupper and William Johnston Tupper, both of whom were Canadian politicians.

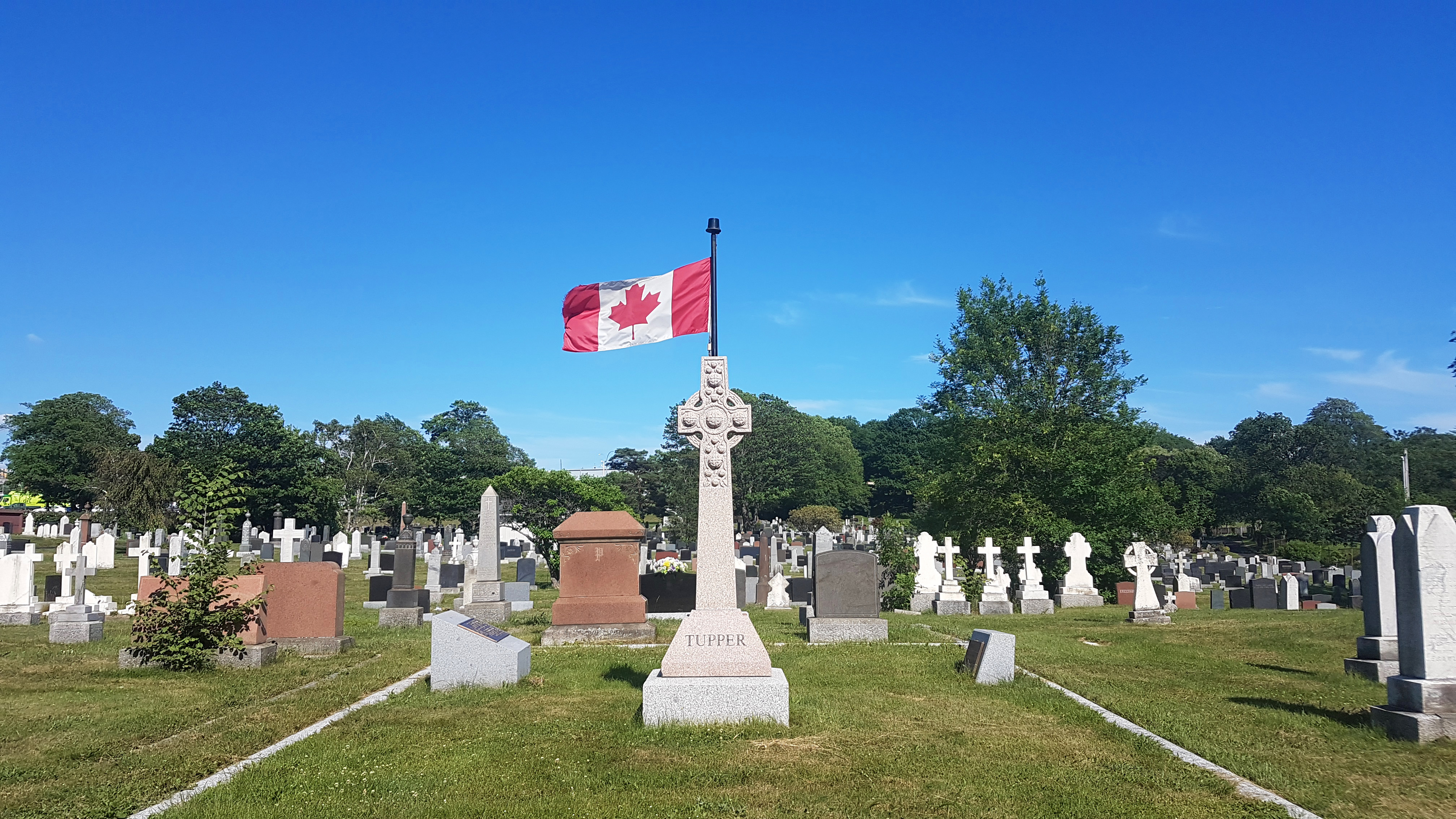
Grave site of Charles and Frances Tupper in St. John's Cemetery in Halifax

On November 9, 1907, Tupper became a member of the British Privy Council. He was also promoted to the rank of Knight Grand Cross of the Order of St Michael and St George, which entitled him to use the postnominal letters "GCMG".

Tupper remained interested in imperial politics, and particularly with promoting Canada's place within the British Empire. He sat on the executive committee of the British Empire League and advocated closer economic ties between Canada and Britain, while continuing to oppose Imperial Federation and requests for Canada to make a direct contribution to imperial defense costs (though he supported Borden's decision to voluntarily make an emergency contribution of dreadnoughts to the Royal Navy in 1912).

In his retirement, Tupper wrote his memoirs, entitled Recollections of Sixty Years in Canada, which were published in 1914. He also gave a series of interviews to journalist W. A. Harkin which formed the basis of a second book published in 1914, entitled Political Reminiscences of the Right Honourable Sir Charles Tupper.

Tupper's wife, Lady Tupper died in May 1912. His eldest son Orin died in April 1915. On October 30, 1915, in Bexleyheath, Tupper died. He was the last of the original Fathers of Confederation to die, and had lived the longest life of any Canadian prime minister, at 94 years, four months. His body was returned to Canada on HMS Blenheim (the same vessel that had carried the body of Tupper's colleague, John Thompson to Halifax when Thompson died in England in 1894) and was buried in St. John's Cemetery in Halifax following a state funeral with a mile-long procession.

== Legacy and recognition ==
Tupper will be most remembered as a Father of Confederation, and his long career as a federal cabinet minister, rather than his brief time as prime minister. As the Premier of Nova Scotia from 1864 to 1867, he led Nova Scotia into Confederation and persuaded Joseph Howe to join the new federal government, bringing an end to the anti-Confederation movement in Nova Scotia.

In their 1999 study of the Canadian prime ministers through Jean Chrétien, J.L. Granatstein and Norman Hillmer included the results of a survey of Canadian historians ranking the prime ministers. Tupper ranked No. 16 out of the 20 up to that time, due to his extremely short tenure in which he was unable to accomplish anything of significance. Historians noted that despite Tupper's elderly age, he showed a determination and spirit during his brief time as prime minister that almost beat Laurier in the 1896 election.

Mount Tupper in the Canadian Rockies and the Sir Charles Tupper Building in Ottawa are named for him. The Sir Charles Tupper Medical Building is the central building of the Dalhousie Medical School in Halifax, Nova Scotia.

== Facility naming ==
- Sir Charles Tupper Secondary School in Vancouver, British Columbia
- Sir Charles Tupper School in Halifax
- Sir Charles Tupper Medical Building at the Faculty of Medicine, Dalhousie University
- Sir Charles Tupper Building in Ottawa

== Coat of arms ==
Coat of arms of Charles Tupper
| Adopted 1886 Crest Upon a grassy mount Vert a greyhound statant Sable charged with two escallops Or and holding in its mouth a sprig of mayflower slipped and leaved proper Escutcheon Per fess Azure and Or on a fess Ermine, between in chief two boars passant Or and in base a sprig of mayflower slipped and leaved proper, three escallops Gules Supporters Two greyhounds Sable each collared and pendent therefrom an escutcheon Or charged with a sprig of mayflower slipped and leaved proper Motto L'ESPOIR EST MA FORCE (French for 'Hope is my strength') Orders Order of St. Michael and St. George: Auspicium Melioris Ævi (Latin for 'Token of a Better Age'); Order of the Bath: Tria juncta in uno (Latin for 'Three joined in one') Other elements Red hand of Ulster baronet badge |

Parliament of Canada
| New constituency | Member of Parliament for Cumberland; 1867–1884 | Succeeded by Charles James Townshend |
| Preceded by Charles James Townshend | Member of Parliament for Cumberland; 1887–1888 | Succeeded by Arthur Rupert Dickey |
| Preceded by David MacKeen | Member of Parliament for Cape Breton; 1896–1900 | Succeeded by Alexander Johnston |
Political offices
| Preceded by James William Johnston | Premier of Nova Scotia; 1864–1867 | Succeeded by Hiram Blanchard |
| Preceded by Edward Kenny | President of the Privy Council; 1870–1872 | Succeeded by John O'Connor |
| Preceded by Alexander Morris | Minister of Inland Revenue; 1872–1873 | Succeeded by John O'Connor |
| Preceded by Samuel Leonard Tilley | Minister of Customs; 1873 | Succeeded by Isaac Burpee |
| Preceded by Alexander Mackenzie | Minister of Public Works; 1878–1879 | Succeeded by Hector Louis Langevin |
| New post | Minister of Railways and Canals; 1879–1884 | Succeeded by John Henry Pope |
| Preceded by Archibald McLelan | Minister of Finance and Receiver General; 1887–1888 | Succeeded by George Foster |
| Preceded by Thomas Mayne Daly | Secretary of State for Canada; 1896 | Succeeded by Richard William Scott |
| Preceded by Mackenzie Bowell | Prime Minister of Canada; 1896 | Succeeded by Wilfrid Laurier |
| Preceded by Wilfrid Laurier | Leader of the Opposition; 1896–1901 | Succeeded by Robert Borden |
Party political offices
| Preceded by Mackenzie Bowell | Leader of the Conservative Party; 1896–1901 | Succeeded by Robert Borden |
Diplomatic posts
| Preceded by Alexander Tilloch Galt | Canadian High Commissioner to the United Kingdom; 1883–1896 | Succeeded by Lord Strathcona |
Baronetage of the United Kingdom
| New creation | Baronet (of Armdale); 1888–1915 | Succeeded by Charles Tupper |
