= Tupper baronets =

Baronetcy in the Baronetage of the United Kingdom

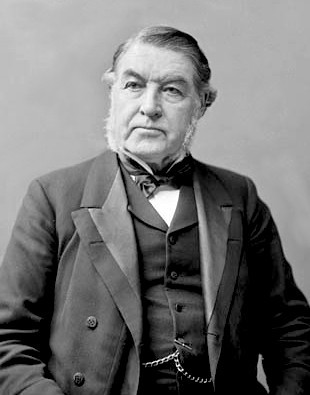
Sir Charles Tupper, 1st Baronet

The Tupper baronetcy, of Armdale, Halifax in Nova Scotia, Canada, is a title in the Baronetage of the United Kingdom. It was created on 13 September 1888 for the Canadian politician Charles Tupper. He was Canadian High Commissioner to the United Kingdom from 1883 to 1896 and Prime Minister of Canada in 1896.

The Official Roll marks the title "dormant".

== Tupper baronets, of Armdale (1888) ==
- Sir Charles Tupper, 1st Baronet (1821–1915)
- Sir Charles Stewart Tupper, 2nd Baronet (1884–1960)
- Sir Charles Tupper, 3rd Baronet (1880–1962)
- Sir James Macdonald Tupper, 4th Baronet (1887–1967)
- Sir Charles Hibbert Tupper, 5th Baronet (1930–2008)
- Sir Charles Hibbert Tupper, 6th Baronet (born 1964)

The heir presumptive is Charles Reginald Hibbert Tupper (born 1947), a second cousin of the present baronet.

=== Line of Succession ===
- Sir Charles Tupper of Armdale, 1st Baronet (1821–1915)
  - James Stewart Tupper (1851–1915)
    - Sir Charles Stewart Tupper, 2nd Baronet (1884–1960)
  - Hon. Sir Charles Hibbert Tupper (1855–1927)
    - Sir Charles Tupper, 3rd Baronet (1880–1962)
    - Sir James Macdonald Tupper, 4th Baronet (1887–1967)
      - Sir Charles Hibbert Tupper, 5th Baronet (1930–2008)
        - Sir Charles Hibbert Tupper, 6th Baronet (born 1964)
    - Reginald Hibbert Tupper (1893–1972)
      - Charles Gordon Hibbert Tupper (1918–1996)
        - (1) Charles Reginald Hibbert Tupper (b. 1947)
      - David Wilson Hibbert Tupper (1921–1999)
        - (2) Sidney Victor Hibbert Tupper (b. 1948)
          - (3) Jesse Derek Tupper (b. 1980)

== Notes ==
Baronetage of the United Kingdom
Preceded by Collet baronets	Tupper baronets of Armdale; 13 September 1888	Succeeded by King baronets
