= Henry Byron McCulloch =

Canadian politician

Member of Parliament for Pictou
- In office October 1935 – June 1957
- Preceded by: Thomas Cantley
- Succeeded by: Russell MacEwan

Personal details
- Born: 24 July 1877 Lower Stewiacke, Nova Scotia, Canada
- Died: 5 May 1962 (aged 84)
- Party: Liberal
- Spouse(s): Mabel Pugsley (m. 12 July 1898)
- Profession: merchant

Henry Byron McCulloch (24 July 1877 – 5 May 1962) was a Liberal party member of the House of Commons of Canada. He was born in Lower Stewiacke, Nova Scotia and became a merchant by career working at various companies such as Standard Clay Producers, Victorial Coal Company Ltd., and Maritime Steel Foundries.

He was first elected to Parliament at the Pictou riding in the 1935 general election then re-elected for successive terms in 1940, 1945, 1949 and 1953. McCulloch was defeated at Pictou by Russell MacEwan of the Progressive Conservative party in the 1957 election.

One important post he held was the chairmanship of the House of Commons committee on railroads, canals, and telegraph lines.

Although a long-time MP, he never made a speech in Parliament until his final year, when he asked for federal and provincial aid to save the community of Westville, Nova Scotia, from becoming a ghost town.

== Electoral history ==
1935 Canadian federal election: Pictou
Party	Candidate	Votes
Liberal	Henry Byron McCulloch	8,416
Conservative	John Alexander Macgregor	6,513
Reconstruction	Perley Chase Lewis	4,202

1940 Canadian federal election: Pictou
Party	Candidate	Votes
Liberal	Henry Byron McCulloch	9,983
National Government	James M. Cameron	8,292
Independent	Chad MacMillan	615

1945 Canadian federal election: Pictou
Party	Candidate	Votes
Liberal	Henry Byron McCulloch	9,774
Progressive Conservative	William Thomas Hayden	9,387
Co-operative Commonwealth	Murray A. Bent	2,610
Labor–Progressive	George MacEachern	323

1949 Canadian federal election: Pictou
Party	Candidate	Votes
Liberal	Henry Byron McCulloch	10,930
Progressive Conservative	Ernest George Irish	9,236
Co-operative Commonwealth	Florence William McCarthy	1,397

1953 Canadian federal election: Pictou
Party	Candidate	Votes
Liberal	Henry Byron McCulloch	10,626
Progressive Conservative	Donald R. MacLeod	8,778
Co-operative Commonwealth	G. Miller Dick	1,599

1957 Canadian federal election: Pictou
Party	Candidate	Votes
Progressive Conservative	Russell MacEwan	12,208
Liberal	Henry Byron McCulloch	9,251
Social Credit	Carl J. Bates	473
Co-operative Commonwealth	Donald R. Murphy	459
