= John A. Dawson (Canadian politician) =

Canadian politician

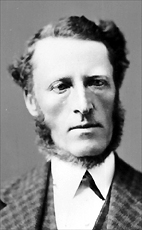

Member of the 3rd Canadian Parliament for Pictou
- In office 1874–1878
- Preceded by: Robert Doull and James McDonald
- Succeeded by: Robert Doull and James McDonald

Personal details
- Born: 1826 Pictou, Nova Scotia
- Died: October 31, 1902 (aged 75–76) Pictou, Nova Scotia, Canada
- Party: Liberal Party of Canada
- Occupation: merchant, taxidermist

John A. Dawson (1826 – October 31, 1902) was a Canadian politician, merchant and taxidermist.

Dawson was born in Pictou, Nova Scotia. He was concurrently elected to the House of Commons of Canada with James William Carmichael in 1874 as a member of the Liberal Party to represent the riding of Pictou. He lost in the elections of 1878 and 1882.

== Electoral history ==
1874 Canadian federal election: Pictou
Party	Candidate	Votes	Elected
Liberal	James William Carmichael	2,178	✓
Liberal	John A. Dawson	2,124	✓
Liberal–Conservative	Robert Doull	2,123	
Conservative	James McDonald	2,110	
Source(s) "General Election (1874-01-22)". Elections and Candidates. Library of Parliament.

1878 Canadian federal election: Pictou
Party	Candidate	Votes	Elected
Conservative	James McDonald	2,747	✓
Liberal–Conservative	Robert Doull	2,681	✓
Liberal	James William Carmichael	2,433	
Liberal	John A. Dawson	2,378	

1882 Canadian federal election: Pictou
Party	Candidate	Votes	Elected
Liberal–Conservative	John McDougald	2,709	✓
Conservative	Charles Hibbert Tupper	2,681	✓
Liberal	James William Carmichael	2,397	
Liberal	John A. Dawson	2,320	
