= William Johnston Tupper =

Canadian politician

The Honourable William Johnston Tupper KC
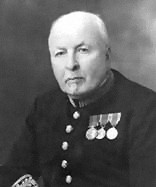

12th Lieutenant Governor of Manitoba
- In office 1 December 1934 – 1 November 1940
- Monarchs: George V Edward VIII; George VI
- Governors General: The Earl of Bessborough; The Lord Tweedsmuir; The Earl of Athlone
- Premier: John Bracken
- Preceded by: James Duncan McGregor
- Succeeded by: Roland Fairbairn McWilliams

Personal details
- Born: 29 June 1862 Halifax, Nova Scotia
- Died: 16 December 1947 (aged 85) Winnipeg, Manitoba, Canada
- Party: Conservative
- Spouse: Margaret McDonald
- Parent(s): Charles Tupper; Frances Morse
- Education: Upper Canada College; Harvard Law School
- Occupation: Lawyer

William Johnston Tupper KC (29 June 1862 – 16 December 1947) was a politician and office holder in Manitoba, Canada. He served as the province's 12th lieutenant governor from 1934 to 1940.

Tupper was born in Halifax, Nova Scotia, the son of Charles Tupper (who later served as Premier of Nova Scotia from 1863 to 1867, and Prime Minister of Canada in 1896) and Frances Amélia Morse. He was named in honour of his father's mentor James William Johnston. He was educated at Upper Canada College and Harvard Law School but returned to Nova Scotia to practice law, being called to the bar in 1885. Later in the same year, Tupper enlisted as a private in the Canadian army to assist in putting down the North-West Rebellion, and remained in Manitoba afterwards. He was called to the Manitoba Bar in 1886, and worked in a Winnipeg law firm with Hugh John Macdonald, son of Prime Minister John A. Macdonald. In 1887, he married Margaret, the daughter of James McDonald. He was named a King's Counsel in 1912. Tupper also served as president of the Army and Navy Veterans in Canada.

Tupper entered political life in the 1914 provincial election, running as a Conservative in the rural provincial riding of Morden and Rhineland. He lost to incumbent Liberal Valentine Winkler, 1,073 votes to 971. Tupper ran against Winkler again in the 1915 election, and lost again by an increased margin amid a disastrous provincial defeat for his party.

In the 1920 election, Tupper was one of two Conservatives elected to the provincial legislature for Winnipeg, which elected ten members by a single transferable ballot. He finished second on his party's list, behind John Thomas Haig. Tupper was one of only eight Conservative MLAs in the legislature, and there is no indication that he played a major role in parliament. He ran for re-election in the 1922 campaign, but finished 21st overall on first-preference votes and was eliminated on the 24th count.

In 1931, Tupper was elected president of the Law Society of Manitoba, holding the position for three years.

Tupper was sworn in as lieutenant governor on 1 December 1934, and served until 1 November 1940. The position was largely ceremonial by this time, and Tupper had little influence over the government of John Bracken. He died in Winnipeg in 1947.
