= King baronets of Campsie (1888) =

Escutcheon of the King baronets of Campsie

The King baronetcy, of Campsie in the County of Stirling, was created in the Baronetage of the United Kingdom on 10 October 1888 for James King, Lord Provost of Glasgow between 1886 and 1889.

== King baronets, of Campsie (1888) ==
- Sir James King, 1st Baronet (1830–1911)
- Sir John Westall King, 2nd Baronet (1863–1940)
- Sir James Granville Le Neve King, 3rd Baronet (1898–1989)
- Sir John Christopher King, 4th Baronet (1933–2014)
- Sir James Rupert King, 5th Baronet (born 1961)

The heir apparent to the baronetcy is the current holder's elder son, John Alistair King (born 1996).

== Notes ==
Baronetage of the United Kingdom
Preceded by Tupper baronets	King baronets of Campsie; 10 October 1888	Succeeded by Bramwell baronets
