= Alexander McGregor (Canadian politician) =

Canadian politician

Alexander McGregor (May 5, 1864 – October 19, 1939) was a lumber merchant and political figure in Nova Scotia, Canada. He represented Pictou in the House of Commons of Canada from 1917 to 1921 as a Unionist Party member.

He was born in McLellan's Brook, Nova Scotia, the son of Daniel McGregor and Mary Jane McGillivray, and was educated there and in New Glasgow. McGregor established himself in business in New Glasgow. In 1889, he married Sarah M. Fraser. He died in New Glasgow at the age of 75.

== Electoral record ==
1917 Canadian federal election: Pictou
Party	Candidate	Votes
Government (Unionist)	Alexander McGregor	6,800
Opposition (Laurier Liberals)	Robert Hugh Mackay	6,043
