= St. John's Cemetery (Halifax, Nova Scotia) =

Cemetery in Nova Scotia, Canada

St. John’s Cemetery
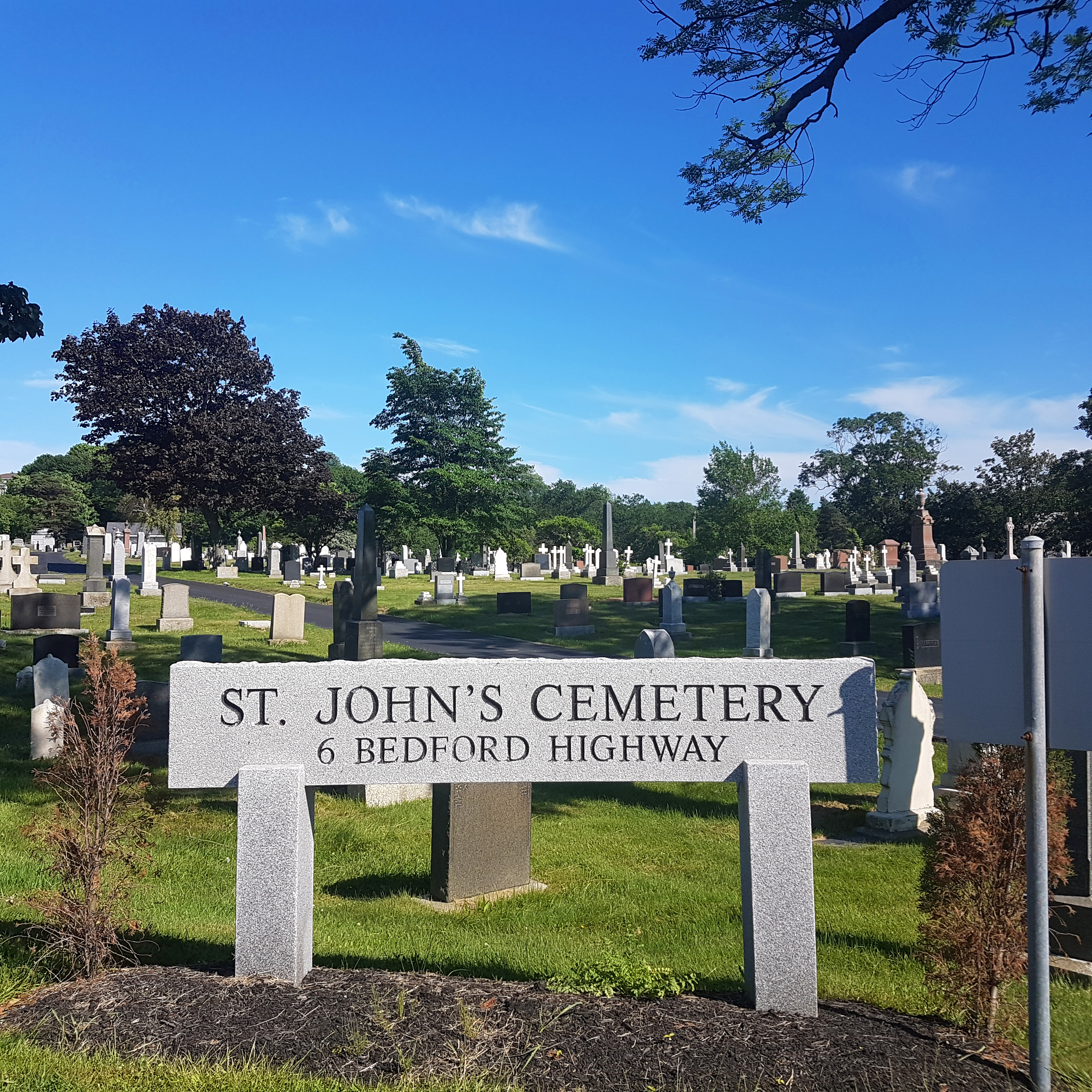
- St. John’s Cemetery in 2019
- Interactive map of St. John’s Cemetery

Details
- Established: 1839
- Location: 6 Bedford Highway, Halifax, Nova Scotia
- Country: Canada
- Coordinates: 44°39′43.9″N 63°37′30.1″W
- Owned by: Parish of St. John's Anglican Church, Halifax
- No. of graves: 12,000+
- Website: https://stjohnscemetery.ca/
- Find a Grave: St. John’s Cemetery

St. John's Cemetery is a cemetery in Halifax, Nova Scotia and forms a series of cemeteries in the Fairview area of Halifax, next to Fairview Lawn Cemetery and Baron de Hirsch Cemetery.

Opened in 1839, it is the final resting place for a few prominent Anglicans in Halifax:

- Canadian Prime Minister Sir Charles Tupper
- Father of Confederation John William Ritchie

The cemetery contains war graves of 70 Commonwealth service personnel, 62 from World War I (of whom 48 lie in the Naval Plot in Section Q) and 8 from World War II.

It is also the resting place of many people killed by the 1917 Halifax Explosion, as well as the Reverend Henry Ward Cunningham. A columbarium was added in 1994 A columbarium was added in 1994 on the site of the former St. Johns Anglican Church of Fairview.
