= Thomas Cantley =

Canadian politician

The Honourable Thomas Cantley
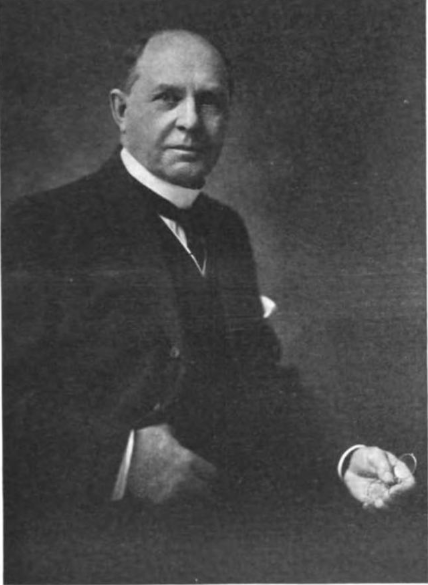

Member of Parliament for Pictou
- In office October 1925 – July 1935
- Preceded by: Edward Mortimer Macdonald
- Succeeded by: Henry Byron McCulloch

Member of the Senate of Canada, New Glasgow, Nova Scotia division
- In office July 1935 – February 1945

Personal details
- Born: 19 April 1857 New Glasgow, Nova Scotia
- Died: 24 February 1945 (aged 87) New Glasgow, Nova Scotia, Canada
- Party: Conservative
- Spouse(s): Maria Fraser m. 1883, d. 14 April 1911
- Profession: Manufacturer

Thomas Cantley (19 April 1857 – 24 February 1945) was a Conservative member of the House of Commons of Canada. He was born in New Glasgow, Nova Scotia and became a steel manufacturer and participated in numerous corporate directorships.

The son of Charles Cantley and Catherine Fraser, Cantley attended school at New Glasgow, then performed military service with the British Expeditionary Force, attaining the rank of colonel. In 1919, he was granted an honorary Doctor of Laws degree by Dalhousie University.

He was first elected to Parliament at the Pictou riding in the 1925 general election after an unsuccessful campaign there in 1921. He was re-elected to the House of Commons in 1926 and 1930.

Cantley was then appointed to the Senate on 20 July 1935 and remained in that role until his death on 24 February 1945.

== Electoral history ==
1926 Canadian federal election: Pictou
Party	Candidate	Votes
Conservative	Thomas Cantley	9,304
Liberal	James A. Fraser	7,920

1930 Canadian federal election: Pictou
Party	Candidate	Votes
Conservative	Thomas Cantley	9,672
Liberal	Josiah H. MacQuarrie	9,174
Source: lop.parl.ca

1935 Canadian federal election: Pictou
Party	Candidate	Votes
Liberal	Henry Byron McCulloch	8,416
Conservative	John Alexander Macgregor	6,513
Reconstruction	Perley Chase Lewis	4,202
