= James William Carmichael =

Canadian politician

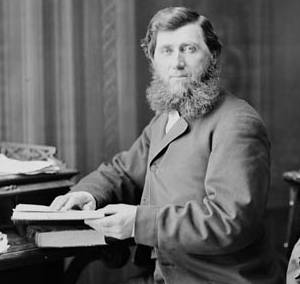
James William Carmichael Source: Library and Archives Canada

James William Carmichael (December 16, 1819 – May 1, 1903) was a Nova Scotia businessman and political figure. He represented Pictou in the House of Commons of Canada as an Anti-Confederate and then a Liberal from 1867 to 1872 and from 1874 to 1878. He represented Nova Scotia in the Senate of Canada from 1898 to 1903.

He was born in New Glasgow, Nova Scotia, in 1819, the son of James Carmichael, the town's founder, and attended Pictou Academy. He began work in his father's shipping and retail business and became owner during the 1850s. He built ships and also transported goods by ship. He was also involved in coal mining, the timber trade, a tannery and an iron foundry. Although he originally built wooden sailing ships, he later built steamers and pioneered the use and building of iron and steel ships in Nova Scotia. Carmichael was also a lieutenant-colonel in the local militia. He was elected to the House of Commons in 1867 as an opponent of Confederation, but joined the Liberals in 1869. He was reelected in 1874 and was named to the Senate in 1898, resigning shortly before his death in New Glasgow in 1903.

== Electoral history ==
1867 Canadian federal election: Pictou
Party	Candidate	Votes
Anti-Confederation	James William Carmichael	2,011
Conservative	James McDonald	1,653
Source: Canadian Elections Database

1872 Canadian federal election: Pictou
Party	Candidate	Votes	Elected
Liberal–Conservative	Robert Doull	2,328	✓
Conservative	James McDonald	2,327	✓
Liberal	James William Carmichael	2,122	
Unknown	J. Kitchen	2,011	
Source: Canadian Elections Database

1874 Canadian federal election: Pictou
Party	Candidate	Votes	Elected
Liberal	James William Carmichael	2,178	✓
Liberal	John A. Dawson	2,124	✓
Liberal–Conservative	Robert Doull	2,123	
Conservative	James McDonald	2,110	
Source(s) "General Election (1874-01-22)". Elections and Candidates. Library of Parliament.

1878 Canadian federal election: Pictou
Party	Candidate	Votes	Elected
Conservative	James McDonald	2,747	✓
Liberal–Conservative	Robert Doull	2,681	✓
Liberal	James William Carmichael	2,433	
Liberal	John A. Dawson	2,378	

1882 Canadian federal election: Pictou
Party	Candidate	Votes	Elected
Liberal–Conservative	John McDougald	2,709	✓
Conservative	Charles Hibbert Tupper	2,681	✓
Liberal	James William Carmichael	2,397	
Liberal	John A. Dawson	2,320	
