= Robert Doull =

Canadian politician

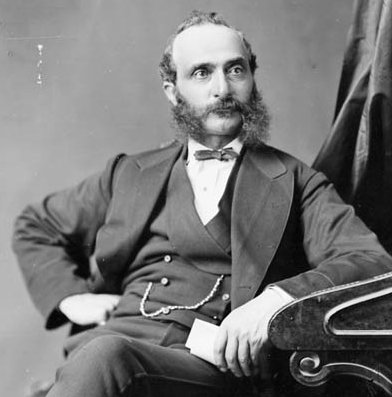

Member of the Canadian Parliament for Pictou
- In office 1872–1874
- In office 1878–1882

Personal details
- Born: 1828 Wick, Caithness-shire, Scotland
- Died: December 9, 1906 (aged 77–78)
- Party: Liberal-Conservative

Robert Doull (1828 – December 9, 1906) was a Scottish-born Canadian merchant and political figure. He represented Pictou in the House of Commons of Canada from 1872 to 1874 and from 1878 to 1882 as a Liberal-Conservative member.

He was born in Wick, Caithness-shire, Scotland, the son of John Doull and Jane Craig, and came to Nova Scotia with his parents while still an infant. In 1852, he married Janet Crichton. Doull was a lieutenant-colonel for the Pictou County militia. He served as treasurer for the county for 15 years and was a director of the Pictou Bank. Doull was defeated in 1874 but then ran successfully for a federal seat in 1878. In 1888, he moved to Craven, Northwest Territories (now Saskatchewan).

== Electoral history ==
1872 Canadian federal election: Pictou
Party	Candidate	Votes	Elected
Liberal–Conservative	Robert Doull	2,328	✓
Conservative	James McDonald	2,327	✓
Liberal	James William Carmichael	2,122	
Unknown	J. Kitchen	2,011	
Source: Canadian Elections Database

1874 Canadian federal election: Pictou
Party	Candidate	Votes	Elected
Liberal	James William Carmichael	2,178	✓
Liberal	John A. Dawson	2,124	✓
Liberal–Conservative	Robert Doull	2,123	
Conservative	James McDonald	2,110	
Source(s) "General Election (1874-01-22)". Elections and Candidates. Library of Parliament.

1878 Canadian federal election: Pictou
Party	Candidate	Votes	Elected
Conservative	James McDonald	2,747	✓
Liberal–Conservative	Robert Doull	2,681	✓
Liberal	James William Carmichael	2,433	
Liberal	John A. Dawson	2,378	
