= Frances Tupper =

Canadian first lady

Lady Tupper
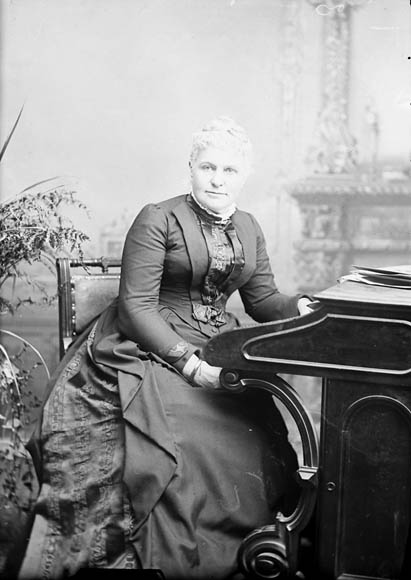
- Frances Tupper, aged 62
- Born: Frances Amelia Morse; March 14, 1826; Amherst, Nova Scotia, Canada
- Died: May 11, 1912 (aged 86); Nova Scotia, Canada
- Known for: Spouse of the Prime Minister of Canada
- Spouse: Sir Charles Tupper
- Children: 6, including: Charles Hibbert Tupper; William Johnston Tupper

Frances Amélia Tupper, Lady Tupper (née Morse; March 14, 1826 – May 11, 1912) was the wife of Sir Charles Tupper, the sixth Prime Minister of Canada. They had six children together, three boys and three girls.

== Legacy ==
Two of their sons, Charles Hibbert Tupper and William Johnston Tupper, also had careers in politics. Lady Tupper was born in Amherst, Nova Scotia.

== See also ==
- Spouse of the prime minister of Canada
