= Richard Tremain =

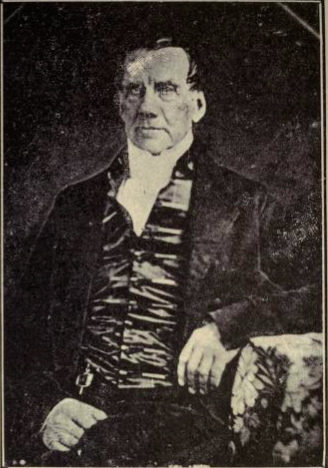
Richard Tremain (1774-1854)

Richard Tremain (1774-1854) was an influential militia officer and merchant in Nova Scotia. He participated in a pressgang riot during the War of 1812 against the Royal Navy. He was an opponent of Joseph Howe.
