= John McDougald =

Canadian politician

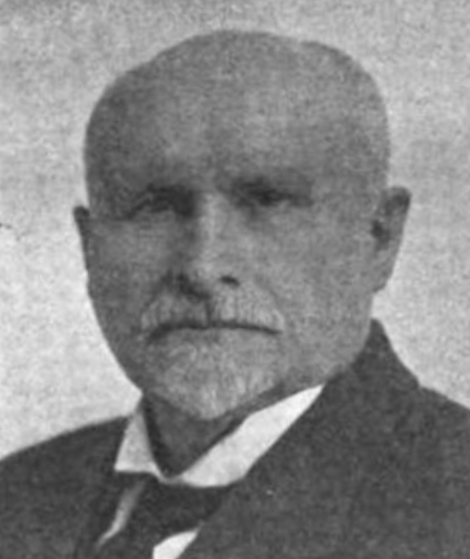

Member of the House of Commons of Canada
- In office 1881–1896
- Constituency: Pictou

Personal details
- Born: March 13, 1848; Blue Mountain, Pictou County, Nova Scotia
- Died: June 14, 1919 (aged 71); Halifax, Nova Scotia
- Spouse: Maggie J. McLeod (m. 1882)
- Occupation: Merchant, politician

John McDougald CMG JP (March 13, 1848 – June 14, 1919) was a merchant and political figure in Nova Scotia, Canada. He represented Pictou in the House of Commons of Canada from 1881 to 1896 as a Liberal-Conservative member.

== Biography ==
He was born in Blue Mountain, Pictou County, Nova Scotia, the son of Dougald McDougald and Elizabeth Fraser, of Scottish descent. He was educated at New Glasgow and established himself as a merchant in Westville. McDougald was named a justice of the peace in 1879 and served as a member of the first municipal council for Pictou County in 1879, being reelected in 1880, 1882 and 1884. He was first elected to the House of Commons in an 1881 by-election held after James McDonald was named Chief Justice of the Supreme Court of Nova Scotia. In 1882, he married Maggie J. McLeod. McDougald was named Commissioner of Customs in 1896. He was named to the Order of St. Michael and St. George in 1912. McDougald died in Halifax at the age of 71.

== Electoral history ==
By-election on 18 June 1881 On Mr. McDonald being appointed Chief Justice of the Supreme Court of Nova Scotia, 20 May 1881
Party	Candidate	Votes
Liberal–Conservative	John McDougald	acclaimed

1882 Canadian federal election: Pictou
Party	Candidate	Votes	Elected
Liberal–Conservative	John McDougald	2,709	✓
Conservative	Charles Hibbert Tupper	2,681	✓
Liberal	James William Carmichael	2,397	
Liberal	John A. Dawson	2,320	

1887 Canadian federal election: Pictou
Party	Candidate	Votes	Elected
Liberal–Conservative	John McDougald	3,413	✓
Conservative	Charles Hibbert Tupper	3,334	✓
Conservative	Adam Carr Bell	2,923	
Independent	John D. McLeod	2,739	
