= Robert Weatherbe =

Canadian lawyer and judge (1834–1915)

Sir Robert Linton Weatherbe (April 1834 – 27 April 1915) was a Canadian lawyer and judge. He was Chief Justice of Nova Scotia from 1904 to 1907.

Born in Bedeque, Prince Edward Island, Weatherbe attended Acadia College in Nova Scotia and thereafter settled in the province. A Liberal Party supporter, he was elevated to the bench on 7 October 1878 by Mackenzie Bowell, a 'midnight judge' appointed two days before Bowell was due to hand over power to Sir John A. Macdonald.

He was an unpopular judge and attempts were made to get rid of him, without success. As the senior puisne, he became Chief Justice of Nova Scotia in 1905, was knighted in 1906, and retired in 1907.
