= Russell MacEwan =

Canadian politician

Howard Russell MacEwan
- Official 1968 portrait

Member of Parliament for Central Nova
- In office 25 June 1968 – 14 January 1971

Member of Parliament for Pictou
- In office 10 June 1957 – 24 June 1968

Personal details
- Born: 8 May 1925 Westville, Nova Scotia
- Died: 29 June 2008 (aged 83) New Glasgow, Nova Scotia
- Party: Progressive Conservative
- Spouse(s): Joan MacDonald (predeceased); Betty MacNeil
- Profession: Barrister and solicitor

Howard Russell MacEwan (8 May 1925 – 29 June 2008) was a Progressive Conservative party member of the House of Commons of Canada. He was born in Westville, Nova Scotia and became a barrister and solicitor by career.

He was first elected at the Pictou riding in the 1957 general election, then re-elected there in the 1958, 1962, 1963 and 1965. With riding boundary changes, MacEwan won re-election at Central Nova riding in the 1968 federal election. He left federal politics in January 1971, during his term in the 28th Canadian Parliament, to become a Nova Scotia provincial judge at Amherst. From 1977 to 1991, he was based in New Glasgow.

Russell MacEwan died at Aberdeen Hospital in New Glasgow, Nova Scotia on 29 June 2008.

== Electoral history ==
1957 Canadian federal election: Pictou
Party	Candidate	Votes
Progressive Conservative	Russell MacEwan	12,208
Liberal	Henry Byron McCulloch	9,251
Social Credit	Carl J. Bates	473
Co-operative Commonwealth	Donald R. Murphy	459

1958 Canadian federal election: Pictou
Party	Candidate	Votes
Progressive Conservative	Russell MacEwan	13,618
Liberal	Alex MacIntosh	8,911

1962 Canadian federal election: Pictou
Party	Candidate	Votes
Progressive Conservative	Russell MacEwan	10,837
Liberal	James M. Cameron	9,153
New Democratic	Alfred L. Matheson	1,539
Social Credit	John J. Henderson	470

1963 Canadian federal election: Pictou
Party	Candidate	Votes
Progressive Conservative	Russell MacEwan	10,566
Liberal	James M. Cameron	8,847
New Democratic	John J. Markie	1,127
Social Credit	Kenneth York Parker	181

1965 Canadian federal election: Pictou
Party	Candidate	Votes
Progressive Conservative	Russell MacEwan	11,289
Liberal	Alistair Fraser	8,509
New Democratic	John L. MacLean	1,568

1968 Canadian federal election: Central Nova
Party	Candidate	Votes	%
Progressive Conservative	Russell MacEwan	16,720	58.57
Liberal	Donald F. Stewart	9,499	33.27
New Democratic	Leo F. McKay	2,330	8.16
Total valid votes		28,549	100.00
