= Pictou (federal electoral district) =

Former federal electoral district in Nova Scotia, Canada

Nova Scotia electoral district

Defunct federal electoral district
- Legislature: House of Commons
- District created: 1867
- District abolished: 1966
- First contested: 1867
- Last contested: 1965

Demographics
- Census division(s): Pictou

Pictou was a federal electoral district in Nova Scotia, Canada, that was represented in the House of Commons of Canada from 1867 to 1968. It was created in the British North America Act 1867. It consisted of the County of Pictou. It was abolished in 1966 when it was merged into the riding of Central Nova. It returned two members from 1872 to 1903.

== Members of Parliament ==
This riding elected the following members of Parliament:

Parliament	Years	Member	Party	Member	Party
Pictou
1st	1867 – 1869	James William Carmichael	Anti-Confederation		
1st	1869 – 1872	James William Carmichael	Liberal		
2nd	1872 – 1874	Robert Doull	Liberal–Conservative	James McDonald	Conservative
3rd	1874 – 1878	James William Carmichael	Liberal	John A. Dawson	Liberal
4th	1878	James McDonald	Conservative	Robert Doull	Liberal–Conservative
4th	1878 – 1881	James McDonald	Conservative	Robert Doull	Liberal–Conservative
4th	1881 – 1882	John McDougald	Liberal–Conservative	Robert Doull	Liberal–Conservative
5th	1882 – 1887	John McDougald	Liberal–Conservative	Charles Hibbert Tupper	Conservative
6th	1887 – 1888	John McDougald	Liberal–Conservative	Charles Hibbert Tupper	Conservative
6th	1888 – 1891	John McDougald	Liberal–Conservative	Charles Hibbert Tupper	Conservative
7th	1891 – 1896	John McDougald	Liberal–Conservative	Charles Hibbert Tupper	Conservative
8th	1896 – 1900	Adam Carr Bell	Conservative	Charles Hibbert Tupper	Conservative
9th	1900 – 1904	Adam Carr Bell	Conservative	Charles Hibbert Tupper	Conservative
10th	1904 – 1908	Edward Mortimer Macdonald	Liberal		
11th	1908 – 1911	Edward Mortimer Macdonald	Liberal		
12th	1911 – 1917	Edward Mortimer Macdonald	Liberal		
13th	1917 – 1921	Alexander McGregor	Government (Unionist)		
14th	1921 – 1923	Edward Mortimer Macdonald	Liberal		
14th	1923 – 1925	Edward Mortimer Macdonald	Liberal		
15th	1925 – 1926	Thomas Cantley	Conservative		
16th	1926 – 1930	Thomas Cantley	Conservative		
17th	1930 – 1935	Thomas Cantley	Conservative		
18th	1935 – 1940	Henry Byron McCulloch	Liberal		
19th	1940 – 1945	Henry Byron McCulloch	Liberal		
20th	1945 – 1949	Henry Byron McCulloch	Liberal		
21st	1949 – 1953	Henry Byron McCulloch	Liberal		
22nd	1953 – 1957	Henry Byron McCulloch	Liberal		
23rd	1957 – 1958	Russell MacEwan	Progressive Conservative		
24th	1958 – 1962	Russell MacEwan	Progressive Conservative		
25th	1962 – 1963	Russell MacEwan	Progressive Conservative		
26th	1963 – 1965	Russell MacEwan	Progressive Conservative		
27th	1965 – 1968	Russell MacEwan	Progressive Conservative		
Riding dissolved into Central Nova

== Election results ==
1867 Canadian federal election
Party	Candidate	Votes
Anti-Confederation	James William Carmichael	2,011
Conservative	James McDonald	1,653
Source: Canadian Elections Database

1872 Canadian federal election
Party	Candidate	Votes	Elected
Liberal–Conservative	Robert Doull	2,328	✓
Conservative	James McDonald	2,327	✓
Liberal	James William Carmichael	2,122	
Unknown	J. Kitchen	2,011	
Source: Canadian Elections Database

1874 Canadian federal election
Party	Candidate	Votes	Elected
Liberal	James William Carmichael	2,178	✓
Liberal	John A. Dawson	2,124	✓
Liberal–Conservative	Robert Doull	2,123	
Conservative	James McDonald	2,110	
Source(s) "General Election (1874-01-22)". Elections and Candidates. Library of Parliament.

1878 Canadian federal election
Party	Candidate	Votes	Elected
Conservative	James McDonald	2,747	✓
Liberal–Conservative	Robert Doull	2,681	✓
Liberal	James William Carmichael	2,433	
Liberal	John A. Dawson	2,378	

By-election on 4 November 1878 On Mr. McDonald being appointed Minister of Justice and Attorney General, 17 October 1878
Party	Candidate	Votes
Conservative	James McDonald	acclaimed

By-election on 18 June 1881 On Mr. McDonald being appointed Chief Justice of the Supreme Court of Nova Scotia, 20 May 1881
Party	Candidate	Votes
Liberal–Conservative	John McDougald	acclaimed

1882 Canadian federal election
Party	Candidate	Votes	Elected
Liberal–Conservative	John McDougald	2,709	✓
Conservative	Charles Hibbert Tupper	2,681	✓
Liberal	James William Carmichael	2,397	
Liberal	John A. Dawson	2,320	

1887 Canadian federal election
Party	Candidate	Votes	Elected
Liberal–Conservative	John McDougald	3,413	✓
Conservative	Charles Hibbert Tupper	3,334	✓
Conservative	Adam Carr Bell	2,923	
Independent	John D. McLeod	2,739	

By-election on 18 June 1888 On Mr. Tupper being appointed Minister of Marine and Fisheries, 30 June 1888
Party	Candidate	Votes
Conservative	Charles Hibbert Tupper	acclaimed

1891 Canadian federal election
Party	Candidate	Votes	Elected
Conservative	Charles Hibbert Tupper	3,433	✓
Liberal–Conservative	John McDougald	3,384	✓
Liberal	James A. Fraser	2,708	
Liberal	John Yorston	2,594	

1896 Canadian federal election
Party	Candidate	Votes	Elected
Conservative	Charles Hibbert Tupper	3,577	✓
Conservative	Adam Carr Bell	3,503	✓
Liberal	E.M. McDonald	3,349	
Liberal	J.W. Carmichael	3,337	

1900 Canadian federal election
Party	Candidate	Votes	Elected
Conservative	Charles Hibbert Tupper	3,624	✓
Conservative	Adam Carr Bell	3,615	✓
Liberal	Edward Mortimer Macdonald	3,523	
Liberal	James D. McGregor	3,438	

1904 Canadian federal election
Party	Candidate	Votes
Liberal	Edward Mortimer Macdonald	4,148
Conservative	Adam Carr Bell	3,716

1908 Canadian federal election
Party	Candidate	Votes
Liberal	Edward Mortimer Macdonald	4,336
Conservative	Charles E. Tanner	4,037

1911 Canadian federal election
Party	Candidate	Votes
Liberal	Edward Mortimer Macdonald	4,221
Conservative	Adam Carr Bell	3,937

1917 Canadian federal election
Party	Candidate	Votes
Government (Unionist)	Alexander McGregor	6,800
Opposition (Laurier Liberals)	Robert Hugh Mackay	6,043

1921 Canadian federal election
Party	Candidate	Votes
Liberal	Edward Mortimer Macdonald	11,125
Conservative	Thomas Cantley	7,567
Labour	Robert McDonald Reid	1,271

By-election on 6 September 1923 On Mr. MacDonald's acceptance of an office of emolument under the Crown, 15 August 1923
Party	Candidate	Votes
Liberal	Edward Mortimer Macdonald	acclaimed

1925 Canadian federal election
Party	Candidate	Votes
Conservative	Thomas Cantley	9,693
Liberal	Robert H. Mackay	7,731

1926 Canadian federal election
Party	Candidate	Votes
Conservative	Thomas Cantley	9,304
Liberal	James A. Fraser	7,920

1930 Canadian federal election
Party	Candidate	Votes
Conservative	Thomas Cantley	9,672
Liberal	Josiah H. MacQuarrie	9,174
Source: lop.parl.ca

1935 Canadian federal election
Party	Candidate	Votes
Liberal	Henry Byron McCulloch	8,416
Conservative	John Alexander Macgregor	6,513
Reconstruction	Perley Chase Lewis	4,202

1940 Canadian federal election
Party	Candidate	Votes
Liberal	Henry Byron McCulloch	9,983
National Government	James M. Cameron	8,292
Independent	Chad MacMillan	615

1945 Canadian federal election
Party	Candidate	Votes
Liberal	Henry Byron McCulloch	9,774
Progressive Conservative	William Thomas Hayden	9,387
Co-operative Commonwealth	Murray A. Bent	2,610
Labor–Progressive	George MacEachern	323

1949 Canadian federal election
Party	Candidate	Votes
Liberal	Henry Byron McCulloch	10,930
Progressive Conservative	Ernest George Irish	9,236
Co-operative Commonwealth	Florence William McCarthy	1,397

1953 Canadian federal election
Party	Candidate	Votes
Liberal	Henry Byron McCulloch	10,626
Progressive Conservative	Donald R. MacLeod	8,778
Co-operative Commonwealth	G. Miller Dick	1,599

1957 Canadian federal election
Party	Candidate	Votes
Progressive Conservative	Russell MacEwan	12,208
Liberal	Henry Byron McCulloch	9,251
Social Credit	Carl J. Bates	473
Co-operative Commonwealth	Donald R. Murphy	459

1958 Canadian federal election
Party	Candidate	Votes
Progressive Conservative	Russell MacEwan	13,618
Liberal	Alex MacIntosh	8,911

1962 Canadian federal election
Party	Candidate	Votes
Progressive Conservative	Russell MacEwan	10,837
Liberal	James M. Cameron	9,153
New Democratic	Alfred L. Matheson	1,539
Social Credit	John J. Henderson	470

1963 Canadian federal election
Party	Candidate	Votes
Progressive Conservative	Russell MacEwan	10,566
Liberal	James M. Cameron	8,847
New Democratic	John J. Markie	1,127
Social Credit	Kenneth York Parker	181

1965 Canadian federal election
Party	Candidate	Votes
Progressive Conservative	Russell MacEwan	11,289
Liberal	Alistair Fraser	8,509
New Democratic	John L. MacLean	1,568

== See also ==
- List of Canadian electoral districts
- Historical federal electoral districts of Canada
