= James William Johnston =

Canadian politician (1792–1873)

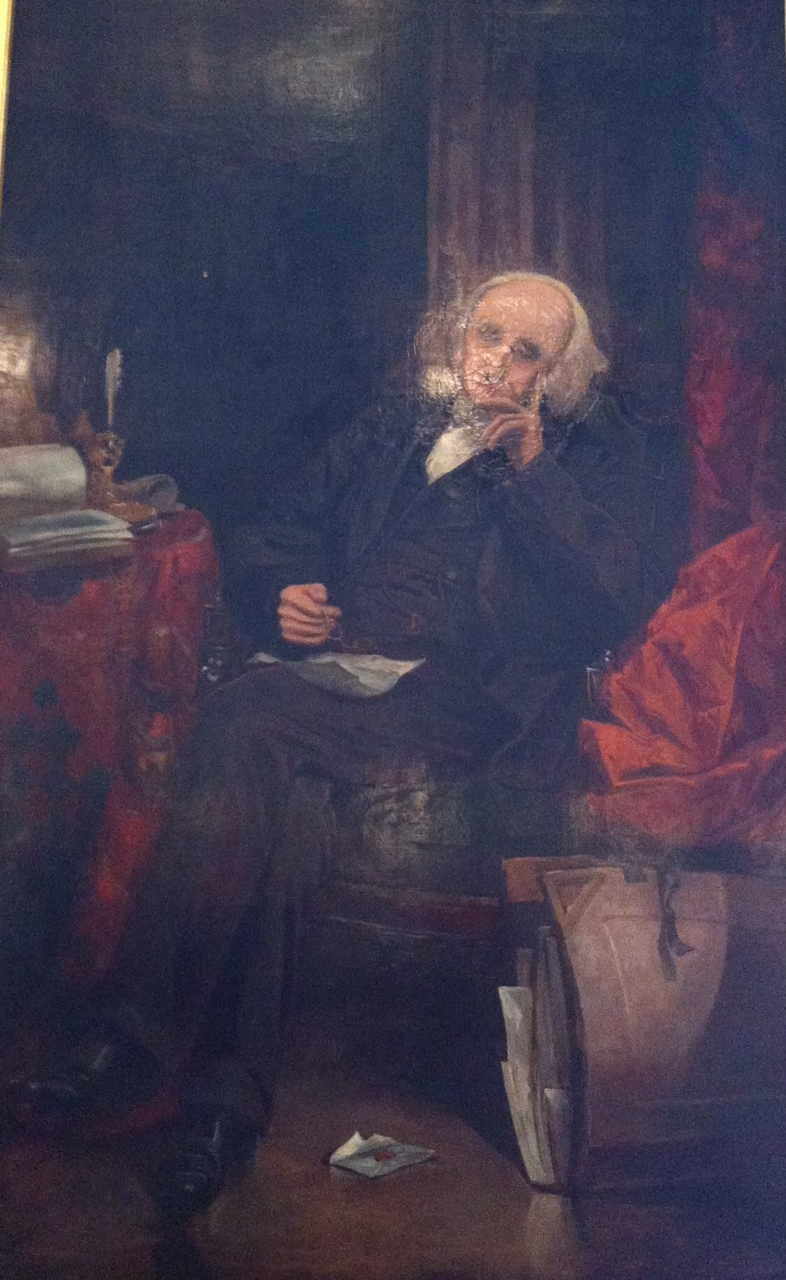
- Portrait of Johnston by Henry Sandham

Premier of the Colony of Nova Scotia
- In office 1857–1860
- Preceded by: William Young
- Succeeded by: William Young
- In office 1863–1864
- Preceded by: Joseph Howe
- Succeeded by: Charles Tupper

Personal details
- Born: 29 August 1792 Jamaica
- Died: 21 November 1873 (aged 81) Cheltenham, England

James W. Johnston (29 August 1792 – 21 November 1873) was a Canadian lawyer and politician. He served as Premier of the colony of Nova Scotia from 1857 to 1860 and again from 1864. He was also Government Leader prior to the granting of responsible government in 1848. He was a Conservative and supporter of Canadian Confederation. Johnston was a descendant of Loyalists who fled the United States during the revolutionary war. Johnston was a member of the Tory establishment in the Colony of Nova Scotia. In 1837, he was appointed to the Legislative Council and while he sometimes supported reform, he was generally a critic and opponent of responsible government and the introduction of party government.

In 1843, he left the Legislative Council to run for the elected legislative assembly and became government leader because of the support of moderate members who opposed the "extremism" of Joseph Howe but were willing to make some concessions.

He lost power when responsible government was instituted in 1848 but continued as leader of what became the Conservative Party and served as the premier from 1857 to 1860 and again from 1863 to 1864 before being appointed to the bench.

Johnston was an early supporter of Canadian Confederation, seeing it as a means of correcting the failings of responsible government.

Political offices
Preceded by William Young	Premier of Nova Scotia; 1857-1860	Succeeded by William Young
Preceded by Joseph Howe	Premier of Nova Scotia; 1863–1864	Succeeded by Charles Tupper
