= James McDonald (Canadian politician) =

Canadian politician

The Honourable James McDonald
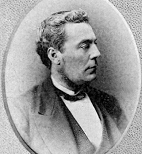

Member of the Canadian Parliament for Pictou
- In office 1872–1874
- Preceded by: James William Carmichael ⋅
- Succeeded by: James William Carmichael
- In office 1878–1881
- Preceded by: James William Carmichael ⋅
- Succeeded by: John McDougald

Chief Justice of Nova Scotia
- In office 1881–1905
- Preceded by: William Young
- Succeeded by: Robert Weatherbe

Personal details
- Born: 1 July 1828 Bridgeville, Nova Scotia
- Died: 3 October 1912 (aged 84) Halifax, Nova Scotia
- Party: Conservative
- Cabinet: Minister of Justice and Attorney General of Canada (1878–1881)

James McDonald, PC (1 July 1828 – 3 October 1912) was a Canadian lawyer, politician, and judge.

He was born in Bridgeville, Nova Scotia, the son of Alexander McDonald and Janet Fraser. McDonald moved to London, Upper Canada in 1834 with his family but the family later returned to New Glasgow, Nova Scotia. McDonald studied law with Martin Isaac Wilkins and was called to the bar in 1851. In 1855, he married Jane Mortimer.

He was elected to the Nova Scotia House of Assembly for Pictou County in 1859. McDonald was reelected in 1863 and was named chief railway commissioner. In 1864, he was named financial secretary and served in that post until 1867 when he was an unsuccessful candidate for a federal seat. In 1871, McDonald was again elected to the Nova Scotia assembly for Pictou County. McDonald was appointed by John A. Macdonald to the parliamentary committee to investigate allegations related to the Pacific Scandal in 1873.

He resigned his seat after he was elected to the House of Commons in 1872. From 1878 to 1881, he was the Minister of Justice and Attorney General of Canada.

He was Chief Justice of Nova Scotia from 1881 to 1904/5.

Political offices
Preceded by Rodolphe Laflamme	Minister of Justice; 1878–1881	Succeeded by Alexander Campbell
Legal offices
Preceded by William Young	Chief Justice of Nova Scotia; 1881–1904	Succeeded by Robert Linton Weatherbe
