= 2nd Canadian Parliament =

1873–74 national legislative term

- Majority (until 1873); Minority (after 1873) (Note: Following John A. Macdonald's resignation as prime minister following the Pacific Scandal, the governor general appointed Alexander Mackenzie (the Leader of the Opposition) to replace him. This resulted in the Liberals forming government despite having less than 50% of the seats in the House of Commons, making it a minority parliament, although the Conservatives still held a majority of the seats despite forming the Official Opposition for the remainder of the parliamentary term.)
- Mar. 5, 1873 – Jan. 2, 1874

Parliament leaders
- Prime minister: Rt Hon. Sir John A. Macdonald; Jul. 1, 1867 – Nov. 5, 1873
- Rt Hon. Alexander Mackenzie; Nov. 7, 1873 – Oct. 8, 1878
- Cabinets: 1st Canadian Ministry; 2nd Canadian Ministry
- Leader of the Opposition: Alexander Mackenzie; March 6, 1873 – November 5, 1873
- Sir John A. Macdonald; November 6, 1873 – October 16, 1878

Party caucuses
- Government: Conservative Party & Liberal-Conservative
- Opposition: Liberal Party*
- * The Liberal Party briefly formed government at the end of the 2nd Parliament.

House of Commons
- Seating arrangements of the House of Commons
- Speaker of the Commons: Hon. James Cockburn; November 6, 1867 – March 5, 1874
- Members: 200 seats MP seats List of members

Senate
- Speaker of the Senate: The Hon. Pierre-Joseph-Olivier Chauveau; February 21, 1872 – January 8, 1874
- Government Senate leader: Alexander Campbell; July 1, 1867 – November 5, 1873
- Luc Letellier de St-Just; November 5, 1873 – December 14, 1876
- Opposition Senate leader: Alexander Campbell; November 7, 1873 – October 8, 1878
- Senators: 79 seats senator seats List of senators

Sovereign
- Monarch: Victoria; 1 July 1867 – 22 Jan. 1901
- Governor general: The Earl of Dufferin; 25 June 1872 – 25 Nov. 1878

Sessions
- 1st session March 5, 1873 – August 13, 1873
- 2nd session October 23, 1873 – November 7, 1873
← 1st	→ 3rd

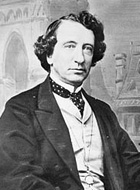
John A. MacDonald, prime minister during most of the second Parlismrnt

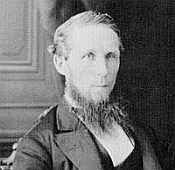
Alexander Mackenzie and his Liberal Party took power at the end of the second Parliament, winning the subsequent general election.

The 2nd Canadian Parliament was in session from March 5, 1873, until January 2, 1874 (303 days). The membership was set by the 1872 federal election from July 20 to October 12, 1872, and it changed only somewhat due to resignations and by-elections until it was dissolved prior to the 1874 election. Among the by-elections were the first election of PEI MPs, PEI joining Confederation in 1873.

It was first controlled by a Conservative/Liberal-Conservative majority under Prime Minister Sir John A. Macdonald and the 1st Canadian Ministry. The Official Opposition was the Liberal Party, led by Alexander Mackenzie. After a scandal in the Conservative Party, the Liberals took power, forming the 2nd Canadian Ministry. Alexander Mackenzie, now Prime Minister, immediately called an election.

The Speaker was James Cockburn. See also List of Canadian electoral districts 1872-1873 for a list of the ridings in this parliament.

The unusual case of a new party taking control of the government between elections has only happened in the federal government twice; the other occasion was in the 15th Canadian parliament.

There were two sessions of the 2nd Parliament:

Session	Start	End
1st	March 5, 1873	August 13, 1873
2nd	October 23, 1873	November 7, 1873

== List of members of the House of Commons ==
Following is a full list of members of the House of Commons during the second Parliament listed first by province, then by electoral district.

Key:

- Party leaders are italicized.
- Cabinet ministers are in **boldface**.
- The Prime Minister is **both**.
- The Speaker is indicated by "(†)".

Electoral districts denoted by an asterisk (*) indicates that district was represented by two members.

=== British Columbia ===
Electoral district	Name	Party	First elected	No. of terms
Cariboo	Joshua Spencer Thompson	Liberal-Conservative	1871	2nd term
New Westminster	Hugh Nelson	Liberal-Conservative	1871	2nd term
Vancouver	Francis Hincks	Liberal-Conservative	1872	1st term
Victoria*	Henry Nathan Jr.	Liberal	1871	2nd term
Victoria*	Amor De Cosmos	Liberal	1871	2nd term
Yale	Edgar Dewdney	Conservative	1872	1st term

=== Manitoba ===
Electoral district	Name	Party	First elected	No. of terms
Lisgar	John Christian Schultz	Conservative	1871	2nd term
Marquette	Robert Cunningham	Liberal	1872	1st term
Provencher	The Honourable Sir George-Étienne Cartier (to May 20, 1873) (death)	Liberal-Conservative	1867	2nd term
Provencher	Louis Riel (from October 13, 1873)	Independent	1873	1st term
Selkirk	Donald A. Smith	Independent Conservative	1871	2nd term

=== New Brunswick ===
Electoral district	Name	Party	First elected	No. of terms
Albert	John Wallace	Liberal	1867	2nd term
Carleton	The Honourable Charles Connell	Liberal	1867	2nd term
Charlotte	John McAdam	Liberal-Conservative	1872	1st term
City and County of St. John*	**Isaac Burpee**	Liberal	1872	1st term
City and County of St. John*	Acalus Lockwood Palmer	Liberal	1872	1st term
City of St. John	The Honourable **Samuel Leonard Tilley** (to November 15, 1873) (named Lieutenant-Governor of New Brunswick)	Liberal-Conservative	1867	2nd term
City of St. John	Jeremiah Smith Boies De Veber (from December 1, 1873)	Liberal	1873	1st term
Gloucester	Timothy Warren Anglin	Liberal	1867	2nd term
Kent	Robert Barry Cutler	Liberal	1872	1st term
King's	James Domville	Conservative	1872	1st term
Northumberland	The Honourable **Peter Mitchell**	Independent	1872	1st term
Queen's	John Ferris	Liberal	1867	2nd term
Restigouche	George Moffat	Conservative	1870	2nd term
Sunbury	Charles Burpee	Liberal	1867	2nd term
Victoria	John Costigan	Liberal-Conservative	1867	2nd term
Westmorland	The Honourable **Albert James Smith**	Liberal	1867	2nd term
York	John Pickard	Independent Liberal	1868	2nd term

Two MPs recontested their seats in byelections, and were reelected.

- **Albert James Smith** was reelected in Westmorland on November 28, 1873.
- **Isaac Burpee** was reelected in the City and County of St. John on December 1, 1873.

=== Nova Scotia ===
Electoral district	Name	Party	First elected	No. of terms
Annapolis	William Hallett Ray	Liberal	1867	2nd term
Antigonish	**Hugh McDonald** (to May 11, 1873) (appointed to Supreme Court of Nova Scotia)	Liberal-Conservative	1867	2nd term
Antigonish	Angus McIsaac (from December 20, 1873)	Liberal	1873	1st term
Cape Breton*	Newton LeGayet Mackay	Conservative	1872	1st term
Cape Breton*	William McDonald	Conservative	1872	1st term
Colchester	Frederick M. Pearson	Liberal	1870	2nd term
Cumberland	**Charles Tupper**	Conservative	1867	2nd term
Digby	Alfred William Savary	Conservative	1867	2nd term
Guysborough	Stewart Campbell	Liberal-Conservative	1867	2nd term
Halifax*	William Johnston Almon	Liberal-Conservative	1867	2nd term
Halifax*	Stephen Tobin	Liberal	1872	1st term
Hants	**Joseph Howe** (to July 5, 1873)	Liberal-Conservative	1867	2nd term
Hants	Monson Henry Goudge (from July 5, 1873)	Liberal	1873	1st term
Inverness	Samuel McDonnell	Conservative	1872	1st term
Kings	Leverett de Veber Chipman	Liberal	1870	2nd term
Lunenburg	Charles Edward Church	Liberal	1872	1st term
Pictou*	Robert Doull	Liberal-Conservative	1872	1st term
Pictou*	James McDonald	Conservative	1872	1st term
Queens	James Fraser Forbes	Liberal	1867	2nd term
Richmond	Isaac Le Vesconte	Conservative	1869	2nd term
Shelburne	**Thomas Coffin**	Liberal-Conservative	1867	2nd term
Shelburne	**Thomas Coffin**	Liberal	1867	2nd term
Victoria	**William Ross** (to July 11, 1873) (appointment to cabinet)	Liberal	1867	2nd term
Victoria	**William Ross** (from December 20, 1873)	Liberal	1867	2nd term
Yarmouth	Frank Killam	Liberal	1868	2nd term

Two MPs recontested their seats in byelections, and were reelected.

- **Hugh McDonald** was reelected in Antigonish on July 7, 1873, on being named Minister of Militia and Defence.
- **Thomas Coffin** was reelected in Shelburne on July 11, 1873, on being named Receiver-General of Canada.

=== Ontario ===
Electoral district	Name	Party	First elected	No. of terms
Addington	Schuyler Shibley	Liberal-Conservative	1872	1st term
Algoma	John Beverley Robinson	Conservative	1872	1st term
Bothwell	David Mills	Liberal	1867	2nd term
Brant North	Gavin Fleming	Liberal	1872	1st term
Brant South	William Paterson	Liberal	1872	1st term
Brockville	Jacob Dockstader Buell	Liberal	1872	1st term
Bruce North	John Gillies	Liberal	1872	1st term
Bruce South	**Edward Blake**	Liberal	1872	1st term
Cardwell	John Hillyard Cameron	Conservative	1867	2nd term
Carleton	John Rochester	Conservative	1872	1st term
Cornwall	Darby Bergin	Liberal-Conservative	1872	1st term
Dundas	William Gibson	Independent Liberal	1872	1st term
Durham East	Lewis Ross	Liberal Reformer	1872	1st term
Durham West	Edward Blake (to April 10, 1873) (dual election in Durham West and Bruce South)	Liberal	1867	2nd term
Durham West	Edmund Burke Wood (from April 10, 1873)	Liberal	1873	1st term
Elgin East	William Harvey	Liberal	1872	1st term
Elgin West	George Elliott Casey	Liberal	1872	1st term
Essex	**John O'Connor**	Conservative	1867	2nd term
Frontenac	George Airey Kirkpatrick	Conservative	1870	2nd term
Glengarry	**Donald Alexander Macdonald**	Liberal	1867	2nd term
Grenville South	William Henry Brouse	Liberal	1872	1st term
Grey East	William Kingston Flesher	Conservative	1872	1st term
Grey North	George Snider	Liberal	1867	2nd term
Grey South	George Landerkin	Liberal	1872	1st term
Haldimand	David Thompson	Liberal	1867	2nd term
Halton	John White	Liberal	1867	2nd term
Hamilton*	Daniel Black Chisholm	Liberal-Conservative	1872	1st term
Hamilton*	Henry Buckingham Witton	Conservative Labour	1872	1st term
Hastings East	John White	Conservative	1871	2nd term
Hastings North	Mackenzie Bowell	Conservative	1867	2nd term
Hastings West	James Brown	Conservative	1867	2nd term
Huron Centre	Horace Horton	Liberal	1872	1st term
Huron North	Thomas Farrow	Liberal-Conservative	1867	2nd term
Huron South	Malcolm Colin Cameron	Liberal	1867	2nd term
Kent	Rufus Stephenson	Conservative	1867	2nd term
Kingston	The Right Honourable Sir **John A. Macdonald**	Liberal-Conservative	1867	2nd term
Lambton	**Alexander Mackenzie**	Liberal	1867	2nd term
Lanark North	Daniel Galbraith	Liberal	1872	1st term
Lanark South	John Graham Haggart	Conservative	1872	1st term
Leeds North and Grenville North	Francis Jones	Conservative	1867	2nd term
Leeds South	Albert Norton Richards	Liberal	1872	1st term
Lennox	**Richard John Cartwright**	Liberal	1867	2nd term
Lincoln	Thomas Rodman Merritt	Liberal	1868	2nd term
London	John Carling	Liberal-Conservative	1867	2nd term
Middlesex East	David Glass	Conservative	1872	1st term
Middlesex North	Thomas Scatcherd	Liberal	1867	2nd term
Middlesex West	George William Ross	Liberal	1872	1st term
Monck	James David Edgar	Liberal	1872	1st term
Muskoka	Alexander Peter Cockburn	Liberal	1872	1st term
Niagara	Angus Morrison	Conservative	1867	2nd term
Norfolk North	John Charlton	Liberal	1872	1st term
Norfolk South	William Wallace	Conservative	1872	1st term
Northumberland East	Joseph Keeler	Liberal-Conservative	1867	2nd term
Northumberland West	James Cockburn (†)	Conservative	1867	2nd term
Ontario North	William Henry Gibbs	Conservative	1872	1st term
Ontario South	**Thomas Nicholson Gibbs**	Liberal-Conservative	1867	2nd term
Ottawa (City of)*	John Bower Lewis	Conservative	1872	1st term
Ottawa (City of)*	Joseph Merrill Currier	Liberal-Conservative	1867	2nd term
Oxford North	Thomas Oliver	Liberal	1867	2nd term
Oxford South	Ebenezer Vining Bodwell	Liberal	1867	2nd term
Peel	Robert Smith	Liberal	1872	1st term
Perth North	Thomas Mayne Daly	Liberal-Conservative	1872	1st term
Perth South	James Trow	Liberal	1872	1st term
Peterborough East	Peregrine Maitland Grover	Conservative	1867	2nd term
Peterborough West	John Bertram	Liberal	1872	1st term
Peterborough West	William Cluxton (not elected candidate but designated by return)	Conservative	1872	1st term
Prescott	Albert Hagar	Liberal	1867	2nd term
Prince Edward	Walter Ross	Liberal	1867	2nd term
Renfrew North	James Findlay	Liberal	1872	1st term
Renfrew South	James O'Reilly	Liberal-Conservative	1872	1st term
Russell	James Alexander Grant	Conservative	1867	2nd term
Simcoe North	Herman Henry Cook	Liberal	1872	1st term
Simcoe South	William Carruthers Little	Liberal-Conservative	1867	2nd term
Stormont	Cyril Archibald	Liberal	1872	1st term
Toronto Centre	Robert Wilkes	Liberal	1872	1st term
Toronto East	James Beaty	Conservative	1867	2nd term
Victoria North	Joseph Staples	Conservative	1872	1st term
Victoria South	George Dormer	Conservative	1872	1st term
Waterloo North	Isaac Erb Bowman	Liberal	1867	2nd term
Waterloo South	James Young	Liberal	1867	2nd term
Welland	Thomas Clark Street (died September 20, 1872, 22 days before the election)	Conservative	1867	2nd term
Welland	William Alexander Thomson (from November 23, 1872)	Liberal	1872	1st term
Wellington Centre	James Ross	Liberal	1869	2nd term
Wellington North	Nathaniel Higinbotham	Liberal	1872	1st term
Wellington South	David Stirton	Liberal	1867	2nd term
Wentworth North	Thomas Bain	Liberal	1872	1st term
Wentworth South	Joseph Rymal	Liberal	1867	2nd term
West Toronto	John Willoughby Crawford (to November 4, 1873) (resigned)	Conservative	1872	1st term
West Toronto	Thomas Moss (from December 18, 1873)	Liberal	1873	1st term
York East	James Metcalfe	Liberal	1867	2nd term
York North	Anson Dodge	Conservative	1872	1st term
York West	David Blain	Liberal	1872	1st term

Five MPs recontested their seats in byelections, and were reelected.

- **Thomas Nicholson Gibbs** was reelected in Ontario South on July 7, 1873.
- **Alexander Mackenzie** was reelected in Lambton on November 25, 1873.
- **Donald Alexander MacDonald** was reelected in Glengarry on November 26, 1873.
- **Richard John Cartwright** was reelected in Lennox on December 3, 1873.
- **Edward Blake** was reelected in Bruce South on December 4, 1873.

=== Quebec ===
Electoral district	Name	Party	First elected	No. of terms
Argenteuil	John Abbott	Liberal-Conservative	1867	2nd term
Bagot	Pierre-Samuel Gendron	Conservative	1867	2nd term
Beauce	Christian Pozer	Liberal	1867	2nd term
Beauharnois	Ulysse-Janvier Robillard	Independent Conservative	1872	1st term
Bellechasse	**Télesphore Fournier**	Liberal	1870	2nd term
Berthier	Anselme-Homère Pâquet	Liberal	1867	2nd term
Bonaventure	**Théodore Robitaille**	Conservative	1867	2nd term
Brome	Edward Carter	Conservative	1871	2nd term
Chambly	Pierre Benoit	Conservative	1867	2nd term
Champlain	John Jones Ross	Conservative	1867	2nd term
Charlevoix	Pierre-Alexis Tremblay	Liberal	1867	2nd term
Châteauguay	Luther Hamilton Holton	Liberal	1867	2nd term
Chicoutimi—Saguenay	William Evan Price	Liberal-Conservative	1872	1st term
Compton	**John Henry Pope**	Liberal-Conservative	1867	2nd term
Dorchester	**Hector-Louis Langevin**	Conservative	1867	2nd term
Drummond—Arthabaska	Pierre-Nérée Dorion	Liberal	1872	1st term
Gaspé	Pierre Fortin	Conservative	1867	2nd term
Hochelaga	Louis Beaubien	Conservative	1872	1st term
Huntingdon	Julius Scriver	Liberal	1869	2nd term
Iberville	François Béchard	Liberal	1867	2nd term
Jacques Cartier	Rodolphe Laflamme	Liberal	1872	1st term
Joliette	Louis François Georges Baby	Conservative	1872	1st term
Kamouraska	Charles Pelletier	Liberal	1869	2nd term
Laprairie	Alfred Pinsonneault	Conservative	1867	2nd term
L'Assomption	Louis Archambeault	Liberal-Conservative	1867	2nd term
Laval	Joseph Bellerose (to July 10, 1873) (called to the Senate)	Conservative	1867	2nd term
Laval	Joseph-Aldric Ouimet (from October 28, 1873)	Liberal-Conservative	1873	1st term
Lévis	Joseph Blanchet	Liberal-Conservative	1867	2nd term
L'Islet	Philippe Baby Casgrain	Liberal	1872	1st term
Lotbinière	Henri Joly de Lotbinière	Liberal	1867	2nd term
Maskinongé	Louis-Alphonse Boyer	Liberal	1872	1st term
Mégantic	Édouard-Émery Richard	Liberal	1872	1st term
Missisquoi	George Baker	Liberal-Conservative	1870	2nd term
Montcalm	Firmin Dugas	Conservative	1871	2nd term
Montmagny	Henri-Thomas Taschereau	Liberal	1872	1st term
Montmorency	Jean Langlois	Conservative	1867	2nd term
Montreal Centre	Michael Patrick Ryan	Liberal-Conservative	1872	1st term
Montreal East	**Louis-Amable Jetté**	Liberal	1872	1st term
Montreal West	John Young	Liberal	1872	1st term
Napierville	**Antoine-Aimé Dorion**	Liberal	1872	1st term
Nicolet	Joseph Gaudet	Conservative	1867	2nd term
Ottawa (County of)	Alonzo Wright	Liberal-Conservative	1867	2nd term
Pontiac	William McKay Wright	Liberal-Conservative	1872	1st term
Portneuf	Esdras Alfred de St-Georges	Liberal	1872	1st term
Quebec-Centre	Joseph-Édouard Cauchon	Conservative	1872	1st term
Quebec County	Pierre-Joseph-Olivier Chauveau (to February 20, 1873) (called to the Senate)	Conservative	1867	2nd term
Quebec County	Adolphe-Philippe Caron (from March 28, 1873)	Conservative	1873	1st term
Quebec East	Adolphe Guillet dit Tourangeau	Conservative	1870	2nd term
Quebec West	Thomas McGreevy	Liberal-Conservative	1867	2nd term
Richelieu	Michel Mathieu	Conservative	1872	1st term
Richmond—Wolfe	William Hoste Webb	Conservative	1867	2nd term
Rimouski	Jean-Baptiste Romuald Fiset	Liberal	1872	1st term
Rouville	Honoré Mercier	Liberal	1872	1st term
Saint Maurice	Élie Lacerte	Conservative	1868	2nd term
Shefford	**Lucius Huntington**	Liberal	1867	2nd term
Town of Sherbrooke	Edward Towle Brooks	Conservative	1872	1st term
Soulanges	Jacques-Philippe Lantier	Conservative	1872	1st term
St. Hyacinthe	Louis Delorme	Liberal	1870	2nd term
St. John's	François Bourassa	Liberal	1867	2nd term
Stanstead	Charles Colby	Liberal-Conservative	1867	2nd term
Témiscouata	Élie Mailloux	Conservative	1872	1st term
Terrebonne	Louis Masson	Conservative	1867	2nd term
Three Rivers	William McDougall	Conservative	1868	2nd term
Two Mountains	Wilfrid Prévost	Liberal	1872	1st term
Vaudreuil	Robert Harwood	Liberal-Conservative	1872	1st term
Verchères	Félix Geoffrion	Liberal	1867	2nd term
Yamaska	Joseph Duguay	Conservative	1872	1st term

Three MPs recontested their seats in byelections, and were reelected.

- **Télesphore Fournier** was reelected in Bellechasse on November 27, 1873, after being named Minister of Inland Revenue.
- **Théodore Robitaille** was reelected in Bonaventure on February 15, 1873, after being named Receiver-General.
- **Antoine Aimé Dorion** was reelected in Napierville on November 27, 1873, after being named Minister of Justice and Attorney General.

=== Prince Edward Island ===
Prince Edward Island joined Canada on July 1, 1873. By-elections for the House of Commons were held on September 29, 1873.

Electoral district	Name	Party	First elected	No. of terms
King's County*	Daniel Davies	Conservative	1873	1st term
King's County*	Augustine Colin Macdonald	Liberal-Conservative	1873	1st term
Prince County*	James Colledge Pope	Conservative	1873	1st term
Prince County*	James Yeo	Liberal	1873	1st term
Queen's County*	**David Laird**	Liberal	1873	1st term
Queen's County*	Peter Sinclair Sr.	Liberal	1873	1st term
