= Thomas Bradburn =

Thomas Bradburn may refer to:

- Tom Bradburn, Scottish cricketer
- Thomas Evans Bradburn (1853–1933), business owner and politician in Ontario, Canada.
