= 2nd Canadian Ministry =

Government cabinet of Canada (1873–1878)

2nd Canadian Ministry 2e conseil des ministres du Canada
- 2nd ministry of Canada

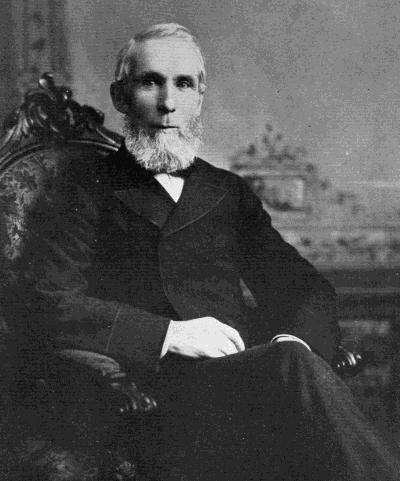
- Date formed: 7 November 1873
- Date dissolved: 8 October 1878

People and organizations
- Monarch: Victoria
- Governor General: Marquess of Dufferin
- Prime Minister: Alexander Mackenzie
- Member party: Liberal
- Status in legislature: Minority (1873–1874); Majority (1874–1878)
- Opposition party: Conservative
- Opposition leader: John A. Macdonald

History
- Incoming formation: Resignation of John A. Macdonald
- Outgoing formation: 1878 federal election
- Election: 1874
- Legislature terms: 2nd Canadian Parliament; 3rd Canadian Parliament
- Predecessor: 1st Canadian Ministry
- Successor: 3rd Canadian Ministry

The Second Canadian Ministry was the cabinet chaired by Prime Minister Alexander Mackenzie. It governed Canada from 7 November 1873 to 8 October 1878, including the last two months of the 2nd Canadian Parliament as well as all of the 3rd. The government was formed by the Liberal Party of Canada.

== Ministries ==
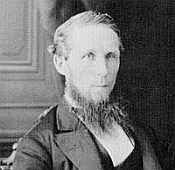
Photograph taken in 1874 of Alexander Mackenzie, the prime minister who led the Second Canadian Ministry

- Prime Minister
  - 7 November 1873 – 17 October 1878: Alexander Mackenzie
- Minister of Agriculture
  - 7 November 1873 – 15 December 1876: Luc Letellier de St-Just
  - 15 December 1876 – 26 January 1877: Isaac Burpee (Acting)
  - 26 January 1877 – 17 October 1878: Charles Alphonse Pantaléon Pelletier
- Minister of Customs
  - 7 November 1873 – 17 October 1878: Isaac Burpee
- Minister of Finance
  - 7 November 1873 – 17 October 1878: Richard John Cartwright
- Superintendent-General of Indian Affairs
  - 7 November 1873 – 17 October 1878: The Minister of the Interior (Ex officio)
  - 7 November 1873 – 7 October 1876: David Laird
  - 7 October 1876 – 24 October 1876: Richard William Scott (Acting)
  - 24 October 1876 – 17 October 1878: David Mills
- Minister of Inland Revenue
  - 7 November 1873 – 8 July 1874: Télesphore Fournier
  - 8 July 1874 – 9 November 1876: Félix Geoffrion
  - 9 November 1876 – 8 June 1877: Rodolphe Laflamme
  - 8 June 1877 – 8 October 1877: Joseph-Édouard Cauchon
  - 8 October 1877 – 17 October 1878: Wilfrid Laurier
- Minister of the Interior
  - 7 November 1873 – 7 October 1876: David Laird
  - 7 October 1876 – 24 October 1876: Richard William Scott (Acting)
  - 24 October 1876 – 17 October 1878: David Mills
- Minister of Justice
  - 7 November 1873 – 1 June 1874: Antoine-Aimé Dorion
  - 1 June 1874 – 8 July 1874: Albert James Smith (Acting)
  - 8 July 1874 – 19 May 1875: Télesphore Fournier
  - 19 May 1875 – 8 June 1877: Dominick Edward Blake
  - 8 June 1877 – 17 October 1878: Rodolphe Laflamme
- Attorney General of Canada
  - 7 November 1873 – 17 October 1878: The Minister of Justice (Ex officio)
    - 7 November 1873 – 1 June 1874: Antoine-Aimé Dorion
    - 1 June 1874 – 8 July 1874: Sir Albert James Smith (Acting)
    - 8 July 1874 – 19 May 1875: Télesphore Fournier
    - 19 May 1875 – 8 June 1877: Dominick Edward Blake
    - 8 June 1877 – 17 October 1878: Rodolphe Laflamme
- Leader of the Government in the Senate
  - 7 November 1873 – 14 December 1876: Luc Letellier de St-Just
  - 14 December 1876 – 17 October 1878: Richard William Scott
- Minister of Marine and Fisheries
  - 7 November 1873 – 17 October 1878: Albert James Smith
- Minister of Militia and Defence
  - 7 November 1873 – 30 September 1874: William Ross
  - 30 September 1874 – 21 January 1878: William Berrian Vail
  - 21 January 1878 – 17 October 1878: Alfred Gilpin Jones
- Postmaster General
  - 7 November 1873 – 19 May 1875: Donald Alexander Macdonald
  - 19 May 1875 – 9 October 1875: Télesphore Fournier
  - 9 October 1875 – 17 October 1878: Lucius Seth Huntington
- President of the Privy Council
  - 7 November 1873 – 20 January 1874: Alexander Mackenzie (acting)
  - 20 January 1874 – 9 October 1875: Lucius Seth Huntington
  - 9 October 1875 – 7 December 1875: Alexander Mackenzie (acting)
  - 7 December 1875 – 8 June 1877: Joseph-Édouard Cauchon
  - 8 June 1877 – 18 January 1878: Edward Blake
  - 18 January 1878 – 17 October 1878: Alexander Mackenzie (acting)
- Minister of Public Works
  - 7 November 1873 – 17 October 1878: Alexander Mackenzie
- Receiver General
  - 7 November 1873 – 17 October 1878: Thomas Coffin
- Secretary of State of Canada
  - 7 November 1873 – 9 January 1874: David Christie
  - 9 January 1874 – 17 October 1878: Richard William Scott
- Registrar General of Canada
  - 7 November 1873 – 17 October 1878: The Secretary of State of Canada (Ex officio)
    - 7 November 1873 – 9 January 1874: David Christie
    - 9 January 1874 – 17 October 1878: Richard William Scott
- Minister without Portfolio
  - 7 November 1873 – 14 February 1874: Dominick Edward Blake
  - 7 November 1873 – 9 January 1874: Richard William Scott

== Succession ==
Ministries of Canada
Preceded by 1st Canadian Ministry	2nd Canadian Ministry; 1873–1878	Succeeded by 3rd Canadian Ministry
