= William Hepburn Scott =

Canadian politician (1837–1881)

Ontario MPP
- In office 1875–1881
- Preceded by: George Albertus Cox
- Succeeded by: Robert Kincaid
- Constituency: Peterborough West

Personal details
- Born: November 5, 1837 Brampton, Upper Canada
- Died: July 11, 1881 (aged 43) Orangeville, Ontario
- Party: Conservative
- Spouse: Sarah Jane Wright
- Occupation: Lawyer

William Hepburn Scott (November 5, 1837 – July 11, 1881) was a Canadian lawyer and political figure. He represented the region of Peterborough West in the Legislative Assembly of Ontario as a Conservative member from 1875 to 1881.

He was born in Brampton in Upper Canada in 1837 and studied at the University of Toronto. He studied law, was called to the bar in 1863 and entered practice with his brother. He married Sarah Jane, the daughter of George Wright, an MLA for Canada West, in 1863. He later moved to Peterborough. He ran unsuccessfully for Peterborough West in the House of Commons in 1874. Scott was elected to the 2nd Parliament of Ontario for Peterborough West in an 1875 by-election. He was defeated in the provincial general election held in 1875 but was declared elected on appeal. He was reelected in 1879. Scott served as a director for the Huron and Quebec Railway. He died at Orangeville in 1881.

== Electoral history ==
Ontario provincial by-election, July 30, 1874: Peterborough West Death of Thomas McCulloch Fairbairn
Party	Candidate	Votes	%	±%
Conservative	William Hepburn Scott	438	50.34	+2.48
Independent	Mr. Dumble	432	49.66	
Total valid votes		870	100.0	−30.01
Conservative gain from Liberal		Swing		+2.48
Source: History of the Electoral Districts, Legislatures and Ministries of the Province of Ontario

1875 Ontario general election: Peterborough West
Party	Candidate	Votes	%	±%
Liberal	George Albertus Cox	970	51.19	
Conservative	William Hepburn Scott	925	48.81	−1.53
Total valid votes		1,895	71.27	
Eligible voters		2,659		
Election voided
Source: Elections Ontario

Ontario provincial by-election, October 1875: Peterborough West Previous election voided
Party	Candidate	Votes	%	±%
Conservative	William Hepburn Scott	995	50.03	−0.32
Liberal	George Albertus Cox	994	49.97	
Total valid votes		1,989		
Conservative hold		Swing		−0.32
Source: History of the Electoral Districts, Legislatures and Ministries of the Province of Ontario

1879 Ontario general election: Peterborough West
Party	Candidate	Votes	%	±%
Conservative	William Hepburn Scott	1,130	52.68	+2.66
Liberal	Mr. Elliot	878	40.93	−9.04
Independent	Mr. Hogan	137	6.39	
Total valid votes		2,145	55.99	
Eligible voters		3,831		
Conservative hold		Swing		+5.85
Source: Elections Ontario
