= Gordon Fraser (politician) =

Canadian politician

Gordon Knapman Fraser

Member of Parliament for Peterborough West
- In office March 1940 – August 1953
- Preceded by: Joseph James Duffus
- Succeeded by: riding merged to Peterborough

Member of Parliament for Peterborough
- In office August 1953 – May 1960
- Preceded by: new riding
- Succeeded by: Walter Pitman

Personal details
- Born: 6 March 1891 Hamilton, Ontario, Canada
- Died: 26 May 1960 (aged 69) Ottawa, Ontario, Canada
- Party: National Government; Progressive Conservative
- Spouse: Phyllis McNeill Tuckett (m. 1914)
- Profession: financial agent and consultant

Gordon Knapman Fraser (6 March 1891 – 26 May 1960) was a National Government and Progressive Conservative party member of the House of Commons of Canada. He was born in Hamilton, Ontario and became a financial agent and consultant by career.

He was first elected at the Peterborough West riding in the 1940 general election, when the Conservative party was operating under the National Government banner, the Liberal candidate, Roland Maxwell Glover, publisher of the Peterborough Examiner.

He again defeated Glover in the 1945 federal election by which time Fraser's party had become the Progressive Conservatives and was re-elected again in 1949. In the 1953 federal election, he won re-election in the new riding of Peterborough.

During his early years in opposition, Fraser was a critic of the National Film Board and the Department of National Defence but supported the development of transport projects such as the Trans-Canada Highway and the Saint Lawrence Seaway.

Fraser sat in the House of Commons until his death on 26 May 1960 in Ottawa, when he collapsed at a book store. Fraser had been the vice-chair of the Select Standing Committee on Railways, Canals and Telegraph Lines.
