= George Hilliard =

Canadian politician

Member of the Canadian Parliament for Peterborough West
- In office 1878–1887
- Preceded by: John Bertram
- Succeeded by: James Stevenson

Personal details
- Born: May 28, 1827 Morrisburg, Upper Canada
- Died: June 23, 1892 (aged 65)
- Party: Liberal-Conservative

George Hilliard (May 28, 1827 – June 23, 1892) was a Canadian businessman and politician from the province of Ontario.

Born in Morrisburg, Upper Canada, the son of Christopher Hilliard, a British officer, and Catherine Meyer, Hilliard came to Peterborough County in 1847. He began working as a clerk in Peterborough in 1847. He opened his own general store with his brother and later managed a lumber business. In 1862, he purchased a saw mill and afterwards a large stone flouring mill. He was elected to the House of Commons of Canada for the electoral district of Peterborough West in the 1878 election. A Liberal-Conservative, he was re-elected in the 1882 election.
