= John Lemuel Bethune =

Canadian physician and politician

Member of the Canadian Parliament for Victoria
- In office 1896–1900
- Preceded by: John Archibald McDonald
- Succeeded by: William Ross

Member of the Nova Scotia House of Assembly for Victoria County
- In office 1886–1896

Personal details
- Born: March 9, 1850 Loch Lomond, Nova Scotia
- Died: September 27, 1913 (aged 63)
- Party: Conservative

John Lemuel Bethune (March 9, 1850 – September 27, 1913) was a Canadian physician and politician in the province of Nova Scotia.

Born in Loch Lomond, Nova Scotia, the son of Roderick and Mary B. Bethune, Bethune received his Doctor of Medicine degree from Dalhousie College in 1875. From 1886 to 1896, he was the Nova Scotia Conservative member of the Nova Scotia House of Assembly for the electoral district of Victoria County. He was elected to the House of Commons of Canada for the electoral district of Victoria in the 1896 federal election. A Conservative, he did not run in 1900. In 1881, he was a captain and paymaster for the 94th Battalion, Argyle Highlanders Volunteer Militia. In 1893, he was promoted to Lieutenant-Colonel.

1896 Canadian federal election: Victoria, Nova Scotia
Party	Candidate	Votes
Conservative	John Lemuel Bethune	1,049
Liberal	S.C. Campbell	877
