= Robert Richard Hall =

Canadian politician (1865–1938)

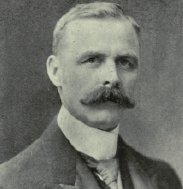

Member of the Canadian Parliament for Peterborough West
- In office 1904–1908
- Preceded by: James Kendry
- Succeeded by: James Robert Stratton

Personal details
- Born: 10 December 1865 Fenelon Township, Victoria County, Canada West
- Died: 8 April 1938 (aged 72)
- Party: Liberal

Robert Richard Hall (10 December 1865 – 8 April 1938) was a Canadian politician.

Born in Fenelon Township, Victoria County, Canada West, Hall was educated at the Cambray Public School and the Peterborough Collegiate and Vocational School Institute. He attended the University of Toronto and Osgoode Hall. A lawyer, Hall was elected to the House of Commons of Canada for the electoral district of Peterborough West at the 1904 general elections. A Liberal, he did not run in 1908. He was defeated in the 1917 election to John Hampden Burnham.
