= Barclay Edmund Tremaine =

Canadian politician

Barclay Edmund Tremaine (April 13, 1839 – January 26, 1907) was a lawyer, judge and political figure in Nova Scotia, Canada. He represented Victoria in the House of Commons of Canada from 1875 to 1876 as a Liberal member.

He was born in Port Hood, Nova Scotia, the son of John Lewis Tremaine and Anna Kearny Caroline Dodd. He was educated at the Horton Academy, studied law and was called to the Nova Scotia bar in 1862. Tremaine first ran for election to the House of Commons in an 1874 by-election held after William Ross was named customs collector for Halifax, but was defeated by Charles James Campbell. After Campbell's election was appealed, Tremaine won the subsequent by-election held in 1875. The following year, he resigned his seat after being named a county court judge for Cape Breton. He served as a judge until 1888. Tremaine resided in Baddeck and died there at the age of 67.

By-election on 28 April 1875 On Mr. Campbell being unseated by decision of the Supreme Court of N.S., 28 February 1875, Mr. B.E. Tremaine was declared duly elected by decision of Election Court, 28 April 1875
Party	Candidate	Votes
Liberal	Barclay Edmund Tremaine

Parliament of Canada
Preceded by Charles James Campbell	Member of Parliament from Victoria, Nova Scotia; 1875–1876	Succeeded by Charles James Campbell
