= Kendry =

Kendry is a name. Notable people with this name include:

- Kendry Flores (born 1991), Dominican baseball player
- James Kendry (1845–1918), Canadian woolen manufacturer and political figure
- Kendrys Morales (born 1983), Cuban-Dominican baseball player, also known as Kendry Morales c. 2010
- Kendry Páez (born 2007), Ecuadorian footballer
