= Peterborough West (provincial electoral district) =

Former provincial electoral district in Ontario, Canada

Ontario electoral district

Defunct provincial electoral district
- Legislature: Legislative Assembly of Ontario
- District created: 1867
- District abolished: 1933
- First contested: 1867
- Last contested: 1929

Peterborough West was an electoral riding in Ontario, Canada. It was created in 1867 at the time of confederation and was abolished in 1926. In 1926, Peterborough West and Peterborough East were redistributed into two ridings Peterborough City and Peterborough County. This lasted until 1934 when both ridings were merged into one riding called Peterborough.

== Members of Provincial Parliament ==
Peterborough West
Assembly	Years	Member	Party
1st	1867–1871	John Carnegie	Conservative
2nd	1871–1874	Thomas McCulloch Fairbairn	Liberal
3rd	1875–1875	George Albertus Cox	Liberal
3rd	1875–1879	William Hepburn Scott	Conservative
4th	1879–1882	William Hepburn Scott	Conservative
4th	1882–1883	Robert Kincaid	Conservative
5th	1883–1886	John Carnegie	Conservative
6th	1886–1890	James Robert Stratton	Liberal
7th	1890–1894	James Robert Stratton	Liberal
8th	1894–1898	James Robert Stratton	Liberal
9th	1898–1902	James Robert Stratton	Liberal
10th	1902–1904	James Robert Stratton	Liberal
11th	1905–1908	Thomas Evans Bradburn	Conservative
12th	1908–1911	Thomas Evans Bradburn	Conservative
13th	1911–1914	Edward Armour Peck	Conservative
14th	1914–1919	George Alexander Gillespie	Liberal
15th	1919–1923	Thomas Tooms	Labour
16th	1923–1926	William Herbert Bradburn	Conservative
Peterborough City
17th	1926–1929	William Herbert Bradburn	Conservative
18th	1929–1934	James Fordyce Strickland	Conservative
Sourced from the Ontario Legislative Assembly
Merged into Peterborough riding before the 1934 election

== Election results ==
=== Peterborough City (1926–1934) ===
1929 Ontario general election: Peterborough City
Party	Candidate	Votes	%	±%
Conservative	James Fordyce Strickland	5,931	51.97	–5.36
Liberal	Archibald Moir	5,481	48.03	+5.36
Total valid votes		11,412	99.18	
Total rejected ballots		94	0.82	+0.22
Turnout		11,506	69.89	–2.98
Eligible voters		16,463		
Conservative hold		Swing		–5.36
Source: Elections Ontario

1926 Ontario general election: Peterborough City
Party	Candidate	Votes	%	±%
Conservative	William Herbert Bradburn	6,396	57.33	–
Liberal	George Alexander Gillespie	4,760	42.67	–
Total valid votes		11,156	99.40	
Total rejected ballots		67	0.60	–
Turnout		11,223	72.87	–
Eligible voters		15,402		
Conservative hold		Swing		–
Source: Elections Ontario

=== Peterborough West (1867–1926) ===
1923 Ontario general election
Party	Candidate	Votes	%	±%
Conservative	William Herbert Bradburn	4,278	44.37	+21.35
Liberal	John W. Meyers	3,374	34.99	–0.49
Labour	Thomas Tooms	1,990	20.64	–20.86
Total valid votes		9,642	99.45	
Total rejected ballots		53	0.55	–2.12
Turnout		9,695	57.87	–16.37
Eligible voters		16,752		
Conservative gain from Labour		Swing		+21.11
Source: Elections Ontario

1919 Ontario general election
Party	Candidate	Votes	%	±%
Labour	Thomas Tooms	4,732	41.49	–
Liberal	George Alexander Gillespie	4,047	35.49	–16.20
Conservative	Robert James Soden	2,625	23.02	–25.29
Total valid votes		11,404	97.33	
Total rejected ballots		313	2.67	+1.76
Turnout		11,717	74.25	–7.55
Eligible voters		15,781		
Labour gain from Liberal		Swing		+12.65
Source: Elections Ontario

1914 Ontario general election
Party	Candidate	Votes	%	±%
Liberal	George Alexander Gillespie	2,587	51.69	+8.22
Conservative	Robert James Soden	2,418	48.31	–8.22
Total valid votes		5,005	99.09	
Total rejected ballots		46	0.91	+0.55
Turnout		5,051	81.80	+19.31
Eligible voters		6,175		
Liberal gain from Conservative		Swing		+8.22
Source: Elections Ontario

1911 Ontario general election
Party	Candidate	Votes	%	±%
Conservative	Edward Armour Peck	2,674	56.53	+1.97
Liberal	Robert Richard Hall	2,056	43.47	–1.97
Total valid votes		4,730	99.64	
Total rejected ballots		17	0.36	–0.30
Turnout		4,747	62.49	–13.65
Eligible voters		7,597		
Conservative hold		Swing		+1.97
Source: Elections Ontario

1908 Ontario general election
Party	Candidate	Votes	%	±%
Conservative	Thomas Evans Bradburn	2,561	54.56	–7.77
Liberal	George Alexander Gillespie	2,133	45.44	+7.77
Total valid votes		4,694	99.34	
Total rejected ballots		31	0.66	+0.22
Turnout		4,725	76.14	+2.58
Eligible voters		6,206		
Conservative hold		Swing		–7.77
Source: Elections Ontario

1905 Ontario general election
Party	Candidate	Votes	%	±%
Conservative	Thomas Evans Bradburn	2,967	62.33	+25.59
Liberal	Roland Fairbairn McWilliams	1,793	37.67	–25.59
Total valid votes		4,760	99.56	
Total rejected ballots		21	0.44	+0.37
Turnout		4,781	73.55	–5.88
Eligible voters		6,500		
Conservative gain from Liberal		Swing		+25.59
Source: Elections Ontario

1902 Ontario general election
Party	Candidate	Votes	%	±%
Liberal	James Robert Stratton	2,849	63.25	–
Conservative	J. W. Miller	1,655	36.75	–
Total valid votes		4,504	99.93	
Total rejected ballots		3	0.07	–
Turnout		4,507	79.43	–
Eligible voters		5,674		
Liberal hold		Swing		+0.00
Source: Elections Ontario

Ontario provincial by-election, November 7, 1899 Ministerial by-election, upon appointment as Provincial Secretary and Registrar
Party	Candidate	Votes
Liberal	James Robert Stratton	acclaimed
Source: Elections Ontario

1898 Ontario general election
Party	Candidate	Votes	%	±%
Liberal	James Robert Stratton	2,742	61.14	+1.14
Conservative	J. W. Garvin	1,743	38.86	–1.14
Total valid votes		4,485	99.82	
Total rejected ballots		8	0.18	–0.55
Turnout		4,493	82.06	+6.96
Eligible voters		5,475		
Liberal hold		Swing		+1.14
Source: Elections Ontario

1894 Ontario general election
Party	Candidate	Votes	%	±%
Liberal	James Robert Stratton	2,280	60.00	+1.42
Conservative	H. C. Winch	1,520	40.00	–
Total valid votes		3,800	99.27	
Total rejected ballots		28	0.73	+0.61
Turnout		3,828	75.10	+4.46
Eligible voters		5,097		
Liberal hold		Swing		+0.71
Source: Elections Ontario

1890 Ontario general election
Party	Candidate	Votes	%	±%
Liberal	James Robert Stratton	1,925	58.58	+8.05
Conservative Equal Rights	John Carnegie	1,361	41.42	–8.05
Total valid votes		3,286	99.88	
Total rejected ballots		4	0.12	–0.59
Turnout		3,290	70.65	–3.30
Eligible voters		4,657		
Liberal hold		Swing		+8.05
Source: Elections Ontario

1886 Ontario general election
Party	Candidate	Votes	%	±%
Liberal	James Robert Stratton	1,555	50.54	+2.30
Conservative	John Carnegie	1,522	49.46	–2.30
Total valid votes		3,077	99.29	
Total rejected ballots		22	0.71	+0.30
Turnout		3,099	73.94	+10.16
Eligible voters		4,191		
Liberal gain from Conservative		Swing		+2.30
Source: Elections Ontario

1883 Ontario general election
Party	Candidate	Votes	%	±%
Conservative	John Carnegie	1,262	51.76	–
Liberal	Mr. Campbell	1,176	48.24	–
Total valid votes		2,438	99.59	
Total rejected ballots		10	0.41	–
Turnout		2,448	63.78	–
Eligible voters		3,838		
Conservative hold		Swing		+0.00
Source: Elections Ontario

Ontario provincial by-election, August 24, 1881 Death of William Hepburn Scott
Party	Candidate	Votes
Conservative	Robert Kincaid	acclaimed
Source: Elections Ontario

1879 Ontario general election
Party	Candidate	Votes	%	±%
Conservative	William Hepburn Scott	1,130	52.68	+2.66
Liberal	Mr. Elliot	878	40.93	−9.04
Independent	Mr. Hogan	137	6.39	
Total valid votes		2,145	55.99	
Eligible voters		3,831		
Conservative hold		Swing		+5.85
Source: Elections Ontario

Ontario provincial by-election, October 1875 Previous election voided
Party	Candidate	Votes	%	±%
Conservative	William Hepburn Scott	995	50.03	−0.32
Liberal	George Albertus Cox	994	49.97	
Total valid votes		1,989		
Conservative hold		Swing		−0.32
Source: History of the Electoral Districts, Legislatures and Ministries of the Province of Ontario

1875 Ontario general election
Party	Candidate	Votes	%	±%
Liberal	George Albertus Cox	970	51.19	
Conservative	William Hepburn Scott	925	48.81	−1.53
Total valid votes		1,895	71.27	
Eligible voters		2,659		
Election voided
Source: Elections Ontario

Ontario provincial by-election, July 30, 1874 Death of Thomas McCulloch Fairbairn
Party	Candidate	Votes	%	±%
Conservative	William Hepburn Scott	438	50.34	+2.48
Independent	Mr. Dumble	432	49.66	
Total valid votes		870	100.0	−30.01
Conservative gain from Liberal		Swing		+2.48
Source: History of the Electoral Districts, Legislatures and Ministries of the Province of Ontario

1871 Ontario general election
Party	Candidate	Votes	%	±%
Liberal	Thomas McCulloch Fairbairn	648	52.13	+2.81
Conservative	John Carnegie	595	47.87	−2.81
Turnout		1,243	69.91	−8.59
Eligible voters		1,778		
Liberal gain from Conservative		Swing		+2.81
Source: Elections Ontario

1867 Ontario general election
Party	Candidate	Votes	%
Conservative	John Carnegie	670	50.68
Liberal	J. Walton	652	49.32
Total valid votes		1,322	78.50
Eligible voters		1,684	
Conservative pickup new district.			
Source: Elections Ontario
