= Edward Armour Peck =

Canadian politician (1858–1947)

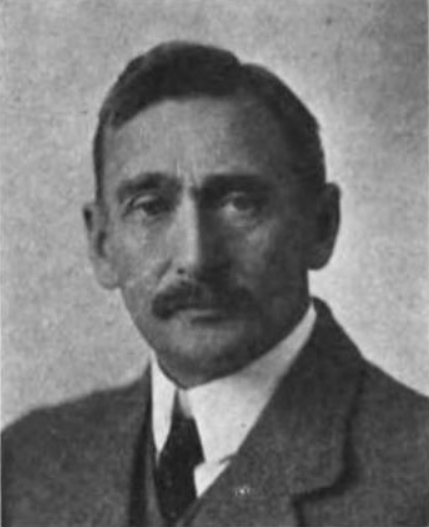

Member of Parliament for Peterborough West
- In office 1925–1935
- Preceded by: George Newcombe Gordon
- Succeeded by: Joseph James Duffus

Ontario MPP
- In office 1911–1914
- Preceded by: Thomas Evans Bradburn
- Succeeded by: George Alexander Gillespie
- Constituency: Peterborough West

Personal details
- Born: 11 September 1858 Alfriston, Sussex, England
- Died: 18 July 1947 (aged 88)
- Party: Conservative
- Spouse: Kitty Revell (m. 1887–1923)
- Occupation: Lawyer

Edward Armour Peck (11 September 1858 – 18 July 1947) was a Conservative member of the House of Commons of Canada. He was born in Alfriston, Sussex, England and became a barrister.

Peck moved from the United Kingdom to Canada in 1869. He attended Peterborough Collegiate Institute and from 1898 to 1904 served as a warden of Peterborough County.

From 1911 to 1914, he was a member of the Legislative Assembly of Ontario at the Peterborough West provincial riding.

He was first elected to Parliament at the Peterborough West federal riding in the 1925 general election then re-elected in 1926 and 1930. After completing his third term, the 17th Canadian Parliament, Peck left federal politics and did not seek another term in the 1935 election.
