= Ebenezer Perry =

Canadian politician

The Honourable Ebenezer Perry

Canadian Senator from Ontario
- In office February 02, 1871 – May 1, 1876

Personal details
- Born: September 29, 1788 Ernestown, Upper Canada
- Died: May 1, 1876 (aged 87) Cobourg, Ontario, Canada

Ebenezer Perry (September 29, 1788 – May 1, 1876) was a merchant and Canadian political figure. He was a Conservative member of the Senate of Canada from 1871 until his death and at the age of 83, the oldest person ever summoned to the Senate.

== Background ==
He was born in Ernestown (later Bath), Upper Canada in 1788. the son of Robert Perry and Jemima Gary Washburn. His father was a United Empire Loyalist from Vermont who had served with the Queen's Rangers and Edward Jessup's Loyal Rangers during the American Revolution. The family settled in Township No. 2, later Ernestown. His uncle was Ebenezer Washburn, a member of the Legislative Assembly who presented Prince Edward County. In 1814, Ebenezer served in the militia during the War of 1812 and moved to Cobourg in 1815. He built a grist mill there, later known as Pratt's Mill or just "The Mill", and still preserved as a heritage building. His son George Perry built the regency styled Woodlawn in 1835, which is located at 420 Division Street. The building survives and today, known as The Woodlawn Inn, which was a hotel and restaurant for many years and is now a rehabilitation facility. Mr. Perry played a central role in numerous town projects. One of the major investors in the Cobourg harbour Commission, Mr. Perry was also a contributor to the stock company which designed and operated a town steamboat and a director of the Cobourg Railway Company. While living at The Woodlawn, Mr. Perry actively lobbied for the incorporation of the Town of Cobourg and served as the first president of the town's board of police. He was also a member of the Legislative Council of the Province of Canada, serving from 1855 until Confederation.

He died in Cobourg in 1876.

His brother Peter was a member of the Legislative Assembly of Upper Canada and of the Province of Canada. His son Charles served in the House of Commons.
