= Duncan McDonald (politician) =

Canadian politician

Duncan McDonald (May 15, 1839 – 1903) was a Canadian merchant and political figure in Nova Scotia. He represented Victoria in the House of Commons of Canada from 1878 to 1882 as a Liberal member.

He was born in Harris, Scotland. In 1869, he married Jessie Agnes N. Brown.

Parliament of Canada
Preceded by Charles James Campbell	Member of Parliament from Victoria, Nova Scotia; 1878–1882	Succeeded by Charles James Campbell
