= Robert Kincaid =

Canadian politician (1832–1920)

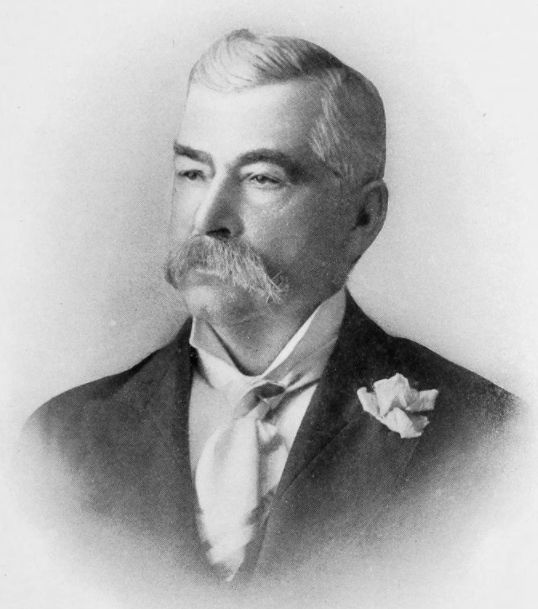

Ontario MPP
- In office 1882–1883
- Preceded by: William Hepburn Scott
- Succeeded by: John Carnegie
- Constituency: Peterborough West

Personal details
- Born: June 10, 1832 County Donegal, Ireland
- Died: August 15, 1920 (aged 88) Seattle, Washington
- Party: Conservative
- Spouse: Mary Margaret Bell (m. 1865)
- Occupation: Physician
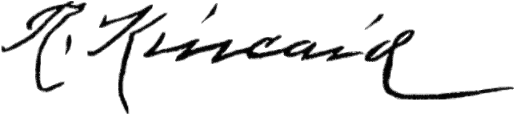
- Signature

Robert Kincaid (June 10, 1832 – August 15, 1920) was an Ontario doctor and political figure. He represented Peterborough West in the Legislative Assembly of Ontario from 1882 to 1883 as a Conservative member.

== Biography ==
He was born in County Donegal, Ireland on June 10, 1832; his parents were of Scottish descent. Kincaid was educated at Queen's University in Kingston, receiving an M.D. In 1865, he married Maggie M. Bell. He served as surgeon for the Peterborough County jail, for the town of Peterborough and for the local militia. He was elected by acclamation to the provincial assembly in an 1882 by-election held after the death of William Hepburn Scott.

He died at his son's home in Seattle on August 15, 1920.
