= William Herbert Bradburn =

Canadian politician from Ontario

Member of the Ontario Provincial Parliament for Peterborough City Peterborough West (1923–1926)
- In office June 25, 1923 – September 17, 1929
- Preceded by: Thomas Tooms
- Succeeded by: James Fordyce Strickland

Personal details
- Party: Conservative

William Herbert Bradburn was a Canadian politician from the Conservative Party of Ontario. He was a member of the Legislative Assembly of Ontario from 1923 to 1929.

== See also ==
- 16th Parliament of Ontario
- 17th Parliament of Ontario
