= George Newcombe Gordon =

Canadian politician (1879–1949)

The Hon. George Newcombe Gordon
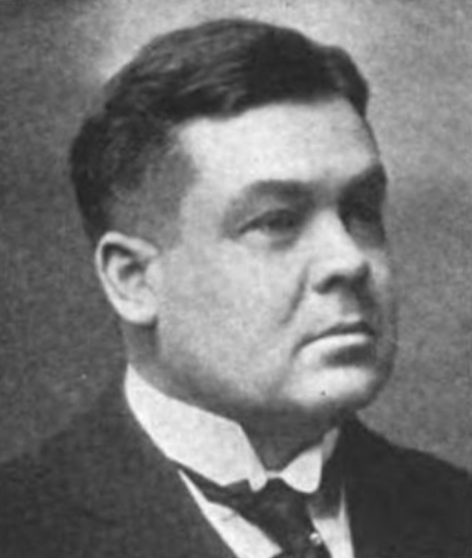

Member of the Canadian Parliament for Peterborough West
- In office 1921–1925
- Preceded by: John Hampden Burnham
- Succeeded by: Edward Armour Peck

Personal details
- Born: April 15, 1879 Brighton, Ontario, Canada
- Died: March 22, 1949 (aged 69) Peterborough, Ontario
- Party: Liberal
- Cabinet: Minister of Immigration and Colonization (1925)
- Portfolio: Deputy Speaker and Chairman of Committees of the Whole of the House of Commons (1922–1925)

George Newcombe Gordon, PC (April 15, 1879 – March 22, 1949) was a Canadian politician.

Born in Brighton, Ontario, he was a barrister before being elected to the House of Commons of Canada from the riding of Peterborough West in the 1921 federal election. A Liberal, he was defeated in the 1925 federal election. From 1922 to 1925, he was the Deputy Speaker and Chairman of Committees of the Whole of the House of Commons. In 1925, he was the Minister of Immigration and Colonization.

He died in Peterborough on March 22, 1949.
