= James Robert Stratton =

Canadian politician (1857–1916)

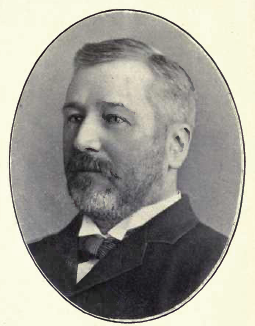

Member of Parliament for Peterborough West
- In office 1908–1911
- Preceded by: Robert Richard Hall
- Succeeded by: John Hampden Burnham

Ontario MPP
- In office 1886–1904
- Preceded by: John Carnegie
- Succeeded by: Thomas Evans Bradburn
- Constituency: Peterborough West

Personal details
- Born: May 3, 1857 Millbrook, Canada West
- Died: April 19, 1916 (aged 58) Hot Springs, Arkansas
- Party: Liberal
- Other political affiliations: Liberal (Ontario)
- Spouse: E.J. Ormond (m. 1881)
- Occupation: Businessman
- Cabinet: Ontario: Provincial Secretary and Registrar (1899-1904)

James Robert Stratton (May 3, 1857 – April 19, 1916) was an Ontario newspaper publisher, businessman and political figure. He represented Peterborough West in the Legislative Assembly of Ontario from 1886 to 1904 and in the House of Commons of Canada from 1908 to 1911 as a Liberal member.

He was born in Millbrook, Durham County, Canada West in 1857, the son of James Stratton (1830-1890), an Irish immigrant who came to Durham County, Upper Canada, in 1845, taught school for seventeen years in Clarke Township and at Ashburnham. In December 1864, James Stratton Senior purchased an interest in the Reform newspaper the Peterborough Examiner, forming a partnership with the editor Alexander Graham under the name "Graham & Stratton, printers and stationers." He became sole proprietor 6 November 1867 when the partnership was dissolved. The Liberal government of Alexander Mackenzie appointed him Collector of Customs at Peterborough in August 1876, a position he held until his death 9 December 1890.

Young J.R. Stratton succeeded his father as publisher of the Peterborough Examiner in 1876 and also sold books, stationery, and wallpaper. He served as a member of the Board of Education in Peterborough. Stratton was Provincial Secretary and Registrar from 1899 to 1904. After being elected in 1908 as an M.P., he ran unsuccessfully for the same seat in the House of Commons in 1911. He married E.J. Ormond in 1881.

The geographical township of Stratton in Nipissing District was named after him.

== Death ==
While in Arkansas Stratton became ill and was put under the care of Professor K. Fiege. As treatment Fiege put Stratton on thirty-six days of fasting with only water allowed. In the last 74 hours of Stratton's life, he suffered from an unstoppable hiccuping. In an effort to stop the hiccuping Fiege used a belt to tighten his chest. The incredible pain was only relieved once Stratton's wife unbuckled the strap. After his death Professor K. Fiege was arrested for manslaughter.
