= Peterborough West =

Former federal electoral district in Ontario, Canada

Ontario electoral district

Defunct federal electoral district
- Legislature: House of Commons
- District created: 1867
- District abolished: 1952
- First contested: 1867
- Last contested: 1949

Peterborough West was a federal electoral district represented in the House of Commons of Canada from 1867 to 1953. It was located in the province of Ontario. It was created by the British North America Act 1867 which divided the County of Peterborough was into two ridings. The West Riding consisted of the Townships of South Monaghan (in the County of Northumberland), North Monaghan, Smith, and Ennismore, and the Town of Peterborough.

In 1903, the townships of Cavendish, Galway, Harvey, and the village of Ashburnham were added to the riding. In 1914, the village of Ashburnham was excluded.

In 1924, Peterborough West was defined to consist of the part of the county of Peterborough included in the townships of Galway, Cavendish, Harvey, Ennismore, Smith, Douro, Otanabee and North Monaghan, and that part of the county of Northumberland included in the township of South Monaghan, together with the city of Peterborough. In 1947, South Monaghan was excluded from the riding.

The electoral district was abolished in 1952 when it was merged into Peterborough riding.

== Members of Parliament ==
This riding elected the following members of the House of Commons of Canada:

Parliament	Years	Member	Party
1st	1867–1872	Charles Perry	Conservative
2nd	1872–1872	John Bertram	Liberal
2nd	1872–1874	William Cluxton	Conservative
3rd	1874–1878	John Bertram	Liberal
4th	1878–1882	George Hilliard	Liberal–Conservative
5th	1882–1887	George Hilliard	Liberal–Conservative
6th	1887–1891	James Stevenson	Conservative
7th	1891–1896	James Stevenson	Conservative
8th	1896–1900	James Kendry	Conservative
9th	1900–1904	James Kendry	Conservative
10th	1904–1908	Robert Richard Hall	Liberal
11th	1908–1911	James Robert Stratton	Liberal
12th	1911–1917	John Hampden Burnham	Conservative
13th	1917–1920	John Hampden Burnham	Government (Unionist)
13th	1920–1921	John Hampden Burnham	Independent Conservative
13th	1921–1921	George Newcombe Gordon	Liberal
14th	1921–1925	George Newcombe Gordon	Liberal
15th	1925–1926	Edward Armour Peck	Conservative
16th	1926–1930	Edward Armour Peck	Conservative
17th	1930–1935	Edward Armour Peck	Conservative
18th	1935–1940	Joseph James Duffus	Liberal
19th	1940–1945	Gordon Fraser	National Government
20th	1945–1949	Gordon Fraser	Progressive Conservative
21st	1949–1953	Gordon Fraser	Progressive Conservative
Riding dissolved into Peterborough

== Election results ==
1867 Canadian federal election: West Riding of Peterborough
Party	Candidate	Votes
Conservative	Charles Perry	681
Unknown	J. Gordon	652
Eligible voters		1,686
Source: Canadian Parliamentary Guide, 1871

1872 Canadian federal election: West Riding of Peterborough
Party	Candidate	Votes
Liberal	John Bertram	735
Conservative	William Cluxton	702

1874 Canadian federal election: West Riding of Peterborough
Party	Candidate	Votes
Liberal	John Bertram	892
Conservative	William Hepburn Scott	801

1878 Canadian federal election: West Riding of Peterborough
Party	Candidate	Votes
Liberal–Conservative	George Hilliard	1,071
Liberal	John Bertram	874

1882 Canadian federal election: West Riding of Peterborough
Party	Candidate	Votes
Liberal–Conservative	George Hilliard	1,035
Unknown	John J. Lundy	875

1887 Canadian federal election: West Riding of Peterborough
Party	Candidate	Votes
Conservative	James Stevenson	1,280
Liberal	George Albertus Cox	1,264

1891 Canadian federal election: West Riding of Peterborough
Party	Candidate	Votes
Conservative	James Stevenson	1,447
Liberal	Robert Richard Hall	1,215

1896 Canadian federal election: West Riding of Peterborough
Party	Candidate	Votes
Conservative	James Kendry	1,485
Liberal	Robert Richard Hall	1,166
Independent	Robert C. Newman	622

1900 Canadian federal election: West Riding of Peterborough
Party	Candidate	Votes
Conservative	James Kendry	1,750
Liberal	Joseph H. McClellan	1,399

1904 Canadian federal election: West Riding of Peterborough
Party	Candidate	Votes
Liberal	Robert Richard Hall	2,467
Conservative	James Kendry	2,280

1908 Canadian federal election: West Riding of Peterborough
Party	Candidate	Votes
Liberal	James Robert Stratton	2,851
Conservative	John Hampden Burnham	2,518

1911 Canadian federal election: West Riding of Peterborough
Party	Candidate	Votes
Conservative	John Hampden Burnham	2,944
Liberal	James Robert Stratton	2,902

1917 Canadian federal election: West Riding of Peterborough
Party	Candidate	Votes
Government (Unionist)	John Hampden Burnham	6,382
Opposition (Laurier Liberals)	Robert Richard Hall	2,964

By-election: On Mr. Burnham's resignation, 7 February 1921: West Riding of Peterborough
Party	Candidate	Votes
Liberal	George Newcombe Gordon	4,093
National Liberal and Conservative	Roland Denne	2,811
Independent Conservative	John Hampden Burnham	2,595
United Farmers of Ontario	James Corbett Campbell	2,319
Labour	Thomas Joseph McMurray	1,103

1921 Canadian federal election: West Riding of Peterborough
Party	Candidate	Votes
Liberal	George Newcombe Gordon	6,890
Conservative	John Hampden Burnham	4,732

1925 Canadian federal election: Peterborough West
Party	Candidate	Votes
Conservative	Edward Armour Peck	9,100
Liberal	George Newcombe Gordon	7,137

1926 Canadian federal election: Peterborough West
Party	Candidate	Votes
Conservative	Edward Armour Peck	8,934
Liberal	Joseph James Duffus	6,825

1930 Canadian federal election: Peterborough West
Party	Candidate	Votes
Conservative	Edward Armour Peck	9,663
Liberal	Joseph James Duffus	7,902

1935 Canadian federal election: Peterborough West
Party	Candidate	Votes
Liberal	Joseph James Duffus	8,027
Conservative	James Fordyce Strickland	6,342
Reconstruction	Charles Hadyn Ackerman	3,071
Co-operative Commonwealth	Lorna Cotton Thomas	1,489

1940 Canadian federal election: Peterborough West
Party	Candidate	Votes
National Government	Gordon Fraser	9,683
Liberal	Roland Maxwell Glover	9,505

1945 Canadian federal election: Peterborough West
Party	Candidate	Votes
Progressive Conservative	Gordon Fraser	10,949
Liberal	Roland Maxwell Glover	8,181
Co-operative Commonwealth	Lorna Cotton Thomas	2,512

1949 Canadian federal election: Peterborough West
Party	Candidate	Votes
Progressive Conservative	Gordon Fraser	10,981
Liberal	Aubrey Victor Clapper	10,738
Co-operative Commonwealth	John Howard Miles	2,804

== See also ==
- List of Canadian electoral districts
- Historical federal electoral districts of Canada
