= William Cluxton =

Canadian politician

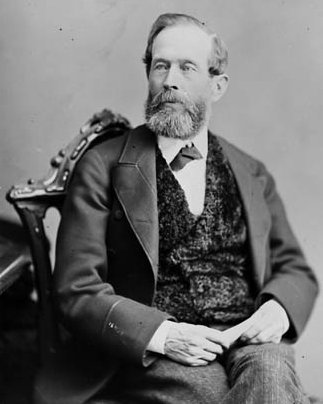

Member of the Canadian Parliament for Peterborough West
- In office 1873–1874
- Preceded by: John Bertram
- Succeeded by: John Bertram

Personal details
- Born: March 31, 1819 Dundalk, County Louth, Ireland
- Died: February 16, 1901 (aged 81)
- Party: Conservative

William Cluxton (March 31, 1819 – February 16, 1901) was a businessman and political figure in Ontario, Canada. He represented Peterborough West in the House of Commons of Canada from 1873 to 1874 as a Conservative member.

He was born in Dundalk, County Louth, Ireland, the son of George Cluxton, and came to Canada while still young. He married Mary Anne Payne. Cluxton served as reeve of Peterborough. He was manager of the Commercial Bank at Peterborough and later president of the Peterboro and Monaghan Gravel Road Company, the Little Lake Cemetery Company and the Midland Railway Company. Although Cluxton received fewer votes than John Bertram, he was declared elected because Bertram had not established his eligibility under the Elections Act.
