= John Carnegie (Peterborough County politician) =

Canadian politician (1837–1910)

Ontario MPP
- In office 1883–1886
- Preceded by: Robert Kincaid
- Succeeded by: James Robert Stratton
- In office 1867–1871
- Preceded by: Riding established
- Succeeded by: Thomas McCulloch Fairbairn
- Constituency: Peterborough West

Personal details
- Born: April 23, 1837 Douro, Upper Canada
- Died: January 10, 1910 (aged 72) Guelph, Ontario
- Party: Conservative
- Spouse(s): Eleanor Hilliard (1858), Frances Snyder
- Relations: John Hilliard Carnegie, son
- Occupation: Newspaper publisher

John Carnegie (April 23, 1837 – January 10, 1910) was an Ontario political figure. He represented Peterborough West in the Legislative Assembly of Ontario as a Conservative member from 1867 to 1871 and from 1883 to 1886.

He was born in Douro, Upper Canada in 1837, the son of a Scottish immigrant, and educated in Peterborough and Brantford. He served on the Douro council from 1859 to 1866 and was reeve from 1864 to 1866. He was secretary and treasurer for the agricultural society for Peterborough County. He married Eleanor Hilliard in 1858 and later married Frances Snyder. Carnegie was owner and editor of the Peterboro Review and the Canada Lumberman. He was also a director of the Ontario Mutual Assurance Company. He was defeated by Thomas McCulloch Fairbairn for the Peterborough West seat in 1871. He died in 1910.

His son John Hilliard Carnegie also later served in the provincial assembly.

== Electoral history ==
1867 Ontario general election: Peterborough West
Party	Candidate	Votes	%
Conservative	John Carnegie	670	50.68
Liberal	J. Walton	652	49.32
Total valid votes		1,322	78.50
Eligible voters		1,684	
Conservative pickup new district.			
Source: Elections Ontario

1871 Ontario general election: Peterborough West
Party	Candidate	Votes	%	±%
Liberal	Thomas McCulloch Fairbairn	648	52.13	+2.81
Conservative	John Carnegie	595	47.87	−2.81
Turnout		1,243	69.91	−8.59
Eligible voters		1,778		
Liberal gain from Conservative		Swing		+2.81
Source: Elections Ontario
