= Horton Academy =

Former preparatory school in Wolfville, Nova Scotia (1828–1959)

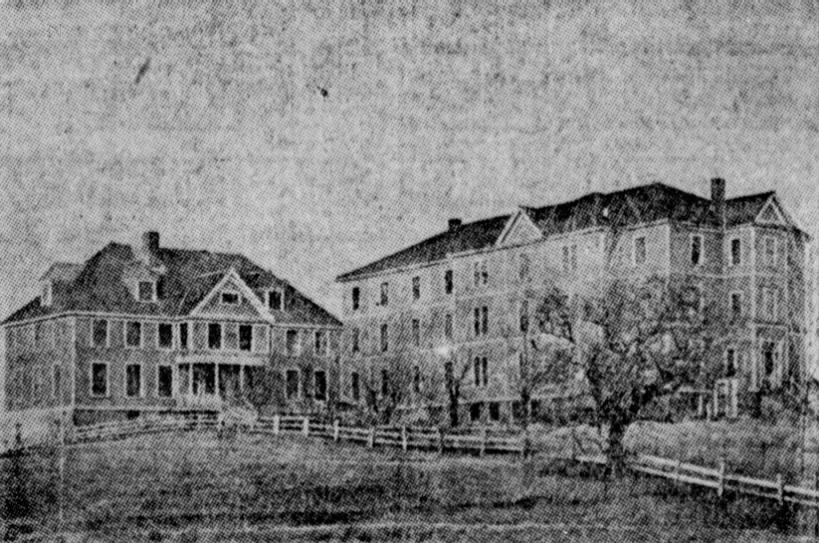
- Horton Collegiate Academy (Right), Edward W. Young Hall (Left)
- Wolfville, Nova Scotia; Canada

Information
- Type: Preparatory school / Collegiate academy
- Established: 1828
- Founder: Nova Scotia Baptist Education Society
- Closed: 1959
- Principal: Various (see article)
- Gender: Co-educational (from 1926)
- Enrollment: Up to 150 students (circa early 20th century)
- Campus: Rural
- Affiliations: Acadia University, Baptist Convention of the Maritime Provinces

Horton Academy, also known as Horton Collegiate Academy, was a Canadian preparatory school located in Wolfville, Nova Scotia.

== History ==
Horton Academy, named after its surrounding community, was an educational institution located in Horton (now Wolfville, Kings County, Nova Scotia). The academy's founding reflected a push by Nova Scotia's Baptist community to raise educational standards among Baptists.

At a June 1828 meeting in Horton, five men—Edmund Crawley, James Nutting, James Johnstone, Lewis Johnstone, and John Pryor—proposed founding the institution to the Nova Scotia Baptist Association. E. A. Crawley presented the prospectus outlining plans to establish a school for higher education. The delegates of the Nova Scotia Baptist Association authorized the creation of the Nova Scotia Baptist Education Society to establish the school, and the Society purchased a farm in Horton's center as its site. With 65 acres secured and a school building prepared, Horton Academy began operating in 1829.

The school offered courses preparing students for university, teaching, and business, while its manual training department taught carpentry, woodturning, forge work, and drawing.

The campus featured an academy home, classrooms housed in the college building, and the Edward Young Manual Training Hall overlooking the Cornwallis River, Minas Basin, and Blomidon. Charles E. Young of Falmouth donated the hall in memory of his son, who had attended the academy. The principal and other teachers administering the school resided in the academy home.

After the Baptist Education Society founded Queen's College (now Acadia University) in 1838, the two institutions worked together. The preparatory school acted as a pipeline to the college.

The first year young women attended Horton Academy classes was 1860.

Control of the academy shifted from the Nova Scotia Baptist Education Society to the Board of Governors of Acadia College in 1865. Through that Board, it was placed under the Baptist Convention of the Maritime Provinces in 1874.

Horton Academy experienced multiple name changes over the years, first becoming Horton Collegiate Academy in 1880.

By 1897, it was one of the oldest Baptist preparatory schools in North America. By then, the academy had trained over 3,000 young men who went on to hold prominent roles in diverse professions.

After becoming Horton Collegiate Academy and Commercial School in 1908, the school adopted the name Horton Collegiate and Business Academy in 1912 to highlight its business curriculum.

The Horton Academy building and Edward W. Young Hall were destroyed by fire on February 3, 1915. The building was replaced with a modern brick structure.

Following the closure of Acadia Ladies Seminary, Horton Academy underwent major reorganization in 1926, becoming a co-ed residential high school known as Horton Academy of Acadia University.

The Acadia University Board of Governors voted to close Horton Academy after the 1958–59 school year and reassign its facilities to the university. The academy shut its doors in June 1959.

== Principals ==
Past principals of Horton Academy:

- Ashael Chapin (1829–1830)
- John Pryor (1830–1838)
- Edward Blanchard (1838–1843)
- Charles D. Randall (1843–1851)
- Jarvis W. Hartt (1851–1860)
- Thomas Alfred Higgins (1860–1874)
- John Freeman Tufts (1874–1881)
- Arthur Armstrong (1881–1883)
- John Freeman Tufts (returning) (1883–1888)
- Ingram Burpee Oakes (1888–1899)
- Horace L. Brittain (1899–1904)
- E. W. Sawyer (1904–1906)
- C. J. Mercereau (1906–1908)
- E. W. Robinson (1908–1910)
- William Laird Archibald (1910–1926)
- E. W. Robinson (returning) (1926–1941)
- Lorraine C. Trites (1941–1959)

== Notable alumni ==
- Sir Charles Tupper
- John Young Payzant
- Alfred Paul Rogers
- James De Mille
- Barclay Edmund Tremaine
- William C. Bill
- Seymour Eugene Gourley
- Paul Kinsman
- Leverett de Veber Chipman
- John Archibald McDonald
- Bob Chambers
- Avard Longley Davidson
- Daniel McNeill Parker
- Gordon Dewolfe Barss
- Andrew R. Cobb

== See also ==
- Acadia University
- Higher education in Nova Scotia
