= Patrick Hughes (politician) =

Canadian politician

Member of Parliament for Niagara
- In office September 17, 1878 – March 20, 1879
- Preceded by: Josiah Burr Plumb
- Succeeded by: Josiah Burr Plumb

Personal details
- Born: March 26, 1827; Newry, County Down, United Kingdom
- Died: March 24, 1899 (aged 71)
- Political party: Liberal

Patrick Hughes (March 26, 1831 – March 24, 1899) was an Irish-born merchant and political figure in Ontario, Canada. He represented Niagara in the House of Commons of Canada from 1878 to 1879 as a Liberal member.

He was born in Newry, County Down, the son of Bernard Hughes and Anne Fegan, and came to Toronto with his family in 1847. Hughes entered the dry goods business with his brother Bernard under the combined name of Hughes Brothers. He was married twice: to Mary Eliza Donohoe in 1857 and to Margaret Louise Sheridan in 1876. Hughes served as a member of Toronto City Council in 1877 and 1878. He was elected to the House of Commons in the 1878 federal election for the riding of Niagara, defeating the incumbent Josiah Burr Plumb; his election was overturned on appeal the following year and he lost the subsequent by-election to Plumb. He was a director of the Imperial Bank in Toronto, the Bristol and West of England Loan and Investment Company and the Toronto Savings Bank.

1878 Canadian federal election: Niagara
Party	Candidate	Votes
Liberal	Patrick Hughes	312
Conservative	Josiah Burr Plumb	310

On election being declared void:

By-election on 20 March 1879
Party	Candidate	Votes
Conservative	PLUMB, Josiah Burr	310
Liberal	HUGHES, Patrick	308
