= Bob Chambers (cartoonist) =

Canadian cartoonist and illustrator (1905–1996)

- Born: Robert William Chambers; April 13, 1905 Wolfville, Nova Scotia, Canada
- Died: March 27, 1996 (aged 90) Halifax, Nova Scotia, Canada
- Area: cartoonist

Robert William Chambers (April 13, 1905 – March 27, 1996) was a cartoonist and illustrator from Nova Scotia whose work appeared in the Halifax Chronicle Herald. At his peak, Chambers produced nine cartoons every week: six for morning papers and three for afternoon papers. His career lasted 53 years.

== Early years ==
Born in Wolfville, Nova Scotia, Chambers began drawing at an early age, and sold his first cartoon to the Halifax Chronicle in 1923. While attending Horton Academy, he produced The Weekly Oriole, which was later sold to Acadia University. By age nineteen in 1924, Chambers traded the Annapolis Valley for New York City where he took night classes at the Art Students League of New York. During the day, he drew cartoons. He went on to work at Fables Pictures Inc. and illustrated Aesop's Fables. After two years, Chambers worked for Paul Terry whose company Terrytoons produced feature length animations during the 1930s and 1940s. To make ends meet, Chambers illustrated covers for sheet music and created drawings for tabloid magazines as well as United Features Syndicate and the New York Evening Graphic. He illustrated the serialization of Erich Maria Remarque's novel The Road Back for United Features in 1931.

== Chronicle Herald ==
In 1932, Chambers returned to Nova Scotia, where he was hired the following year as an editorial cartoonist for the Liberal newspaper, the Halifax Chronicle. He was fired after the Liberals won the 1933 provincial election. The defeated Conservative Premier, Gordon Harrington, told him, "You know Bob, you libeled me twenty-three times in twenty-three cartoons and I didn't sue you. But I sure thought about breaking your nose."

Chambers returned to New York for six months where he worked for the National Screen Service. After returning to Halifax, Chambers was rehired to the Chronicle but on May 17, 1937, he joined the rival Conservative newspaper, the Halifax Herald for better pay, replacing Donald McRitchie. The 1937 election saw Chambers' cartoons appearing in both newspapers, as the Chronicle reprinted some from four years before. The two newspapers merged in 1949 and Chambers continued to work for the Halifax Chronicle-Herald for the rest of his career.

Chambers was a prolific cartoonists, who at his peak produced as many as nine cartoons a week. His cartoons often featured Robert Stanfield, the Nova Scotia premier and leader of the federal Conservative party; Gerald Regan; and G.I. Smith's government in the late 1960s. He was known for his depiction of the Little Man, a regular citizen wearing only a barrel and dealing with life's daily challenges.

While working for the Chronicle-Herald, he published several anthologies of his editorial cartoons, as well as a small paperback booklet entitled Halifax In Wartime, A Collection of Drawings by Robert W. Chambers that was published in 1943.

== Retirement ==
In May 1976, Chambers retired at the age of 71, fifty-three years after publishing his first cartoon with the Chronicle on May 2, 1923. In 1979, he commented on the changing nature of cartooning through the years:

In the old days we drew things with ballons and labels all over the place. The new style is to avoid labels and I agree that it's a good thing. Still, when I draw a character who isn't easily recognized, I'll stick his name on his tie clip. Well, the other day a woman came up to me and I saw her staring at my necktie. I asked her what she was looking at and she said she was just trying to find my name.

Chambers died in March 1996, at age 90.

== Awards ==
- Chambers won two National Newspaper Awards for his work: one in 1953 for his drawing of Prime Minister Louis St. Laurent in Washington, and again in 1966 for a cartoon of John Diefenbaker levitating. He also received a citation of merit from the NNA in 1950.
- Honorary degrees from St. Francis Xavier University in 1965, the Nova Scotia College of Art in 1966, Dalhousie University in 1976, and Acadia University in 1995.
- In 1976 Chambers became a Member of the Order of Canada
- In 1977 he was inducted into the Canadian News Hall of Fame.
