= Charles James Campbell =

Scottish-Canadian merchant and politician

Charles James Campbell (November 6, 1819 – April 17, 1906) was a Scottish-born merchant and political figure in Nova Scotia, Canada. He represented Victoria in the House of Commons of Canada from 1874 to 1875, from 1876 to 1878 and from 1882 to 1887 as a Conservative member.

He was born on the Isle of Skye, the son of John Campbell and Isabella McRae, and came to Nova Scotia in 1831. In 1843, Campbell married Eliza Jane Ingraham. He owned the New Campbellton Coal Mines. He was named a justice of the peace for Cape Breton County in 1851 and county coroner in 1857. Campbell was also lieutenant-colonel for the county militia, served as a chairman of the county board of health, was a school trustee and served on the province's board of agriculture.

Campbell represented Victoria County in the Nova Scotia House of Assembly from 1853 to 1859, from 1863 to 1867 and from 1871 to 1873. He was also elected to the provincial assembly in 1851 and 1860 but was unseated after those elections were appealed. He served as a member of the province's Executive Council from 1856 to 1859. In 1873, he was named to the province's Legislative Council and he served until 1874, when he was elected to the House of Commons. His election was subsequently overturned the following year. Campbell was an unsuccessful candidate for the House of Commons in 1873, 1875, 1878 and 1887.

Campbell died in North Sydney at the age of 86.

== Electoral record ==
1874 Canadian federal election: Victoria, Nova Scotia
Party	Candidate	Votes
Liberal	William Ross	acclaimed
Source: open.canada.ca

By-election on 17 December 1874

On Mr. Ross' resignation, 29 September 1874, to become
Collector of Customs at Halifax, N.S., 5 November 1874

Party
Candidate
Votes

By-election on 21 September 1876 On Mr. Tremaine's resignation, 21 August 1876, to become County Court Judge of District No. 7 Cape Breton, 21 August 1876
Party	Candidate	Votes
Conservative	Charles James Campbell	624
Liberal	John Ross	526

1878 Canadian federal election: Victoria, Nova Scotia
Party	Candidate	Votes
Liberal	Duncan McDonald	748
Conservative	Charles James Campbell	645

1882 Canadian federal election: Victoria, Nova Scotia
Party	Candidate	Votes
Conservative	Charles James Campbell	857
Conservative	J.T. Bethune	544

1887 Canadian federal election: Victoria, Nova Scotia
Party	Candidate	Votes
Conservative	Charles James Campbell	830
Liberal	W.F. McCurdy	777

By-election on 21 November 1887 On election being declared void
Party	Candidate	Votes
Liberal	John Archibald McDonald	960
Conservative	Charles James Campbell	398

Parliament of Canada
Preceded by William Ross	Member of Parliament from Victoria, Nova Scotia; 1874–1875	Succeeded by Barclay Edmund Tremaine
Preceded by Barclay Edmund Tremaine	Member of Parliament from Victoria, Nova Scotia; 1876–1878	Succeeded by Duncan McDonald
Preceded by Duncan McDonald	Member of Parliament from Victoria, Nova Scotia; 1882–1887	Succeeded by John Archibald McDonald
