= Josiah Burr Plumb =

Canadian politician

The Honourable Josiah Burr Plumb
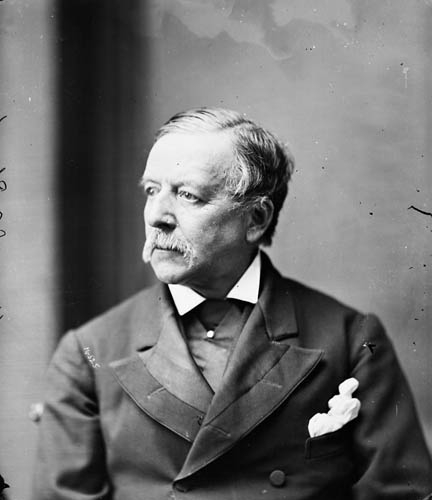
- Plumb, c. 1873

Speaker of the Senate of Canada
- In office 4 April 1887 – 12 March 1888
- Preceded by: William Miller
- Succeeded by: George William Allan

Canadian Senator from Ontario
- In office 8 February 1883 – 12 March 1888
- Nominated by: Sir John A. Macdonald

Member of Parliament for Niagara
- In office 22 January 1874 – 30 November 1874
- Preceded by: Angus Morrison
- Succeeded by: Himself
- In office 22 December 1874 – 16 September 1878
- Preceded by: Himself
- Succeeded by: Patrick Hughes
- In office 20 March 1879 – 19 June 1882
- Preceded by: Patrick Hughes
- Succeeded by: Riding dissolved

Personal details
- Born: 25 March 1816 East Haven, Connecticut, U.S.
- Died: 12 March 1888 (aged 71)
- Party: Conservative

Josiah Burr Plumb (25 March 1816 – 12 March 1888) was an American-born Canadian businessman and parliamentarian.

== Background ==
Born in East Haven, Connecticut, Plumb immigrated to Canada in 1865 and settled near Niagara Falls, Ontario.

Soon thereafter he became active in the Conservative Party of Canada. He was elected three times as a member of parliament for Niagara in the House of Commons of Canada. He was first elected in the Canadian federal election of 1874, but this result was voided, although he successfully defended the seat in a by-election held on 22 December 1874. Although defeated in the 1878 election, he regained his seat in a contested election in 1879.

Following a defeat in 1882 election, he was appointed to the Senate of Canada on 8 February 1883 on the recommendation of Sir John A. Macdonald. He served as Speaker of the Senate from 4 April 1887 – 12 March 1888, upon his death.

== Electoral record ==
By-election on 22 December 1874
Party	Candidate	Votes
Conservative	Josiah Burr Plumb	354
Unknown	Solomon John Johnson Brown	251

1878 Canadian federal election: Niagara
Party	Candidate	Votes
Liberal	Patrick Hughes	312
Conservative	Josiah Burr Plumb	310
