= George Alexander Gillespie =

Canadian politician (1872–1956)

Ontario MPP
- In office 1914–1919
- Preceded by: Edward Armour Peck
- Succeeded by: Thomas Tooms
- Constituency: Peterborough West

Personal details
- Born: December 17, 1872 Toronto, Ontario, Canada
- Died: December 21, 1956 (aged 84) Ontario, Canada
- Party: Liberal
- Spouse: Luella Georgia Archer (m. 1939)
- Occupation: Businessman

George Alexander Gillespie (December 17, 1872 – December 21, 1956) was a merchant and political figure in Ontario. He represented Peterborough West in the Legislative Assembly of Ontario from 1914 to 1919 as a Liberal member.

He was born in Toronto, the son of John L. Gillespie and Margaret Christie. In 1898, he married Elizabeth Loy. He ran unsuccessfully for a seat in the Ontario assembly in 1908. Gillespie was branch manager of Silverwood's Dairy. In 1939, he married Luella Georgia Archer. He died in 1956 and was buried at Keene Upper Cemetery.
