= John Archibald McDonald (Nova Scotia politician) =

Canadian politician

John Archibald McDonald (February 25, 1851 – February 17, 1925) was a lawyer and political figure in Nova Scotia, Canada. He represented Victoria County in the Nova Scotia Legislative Assembly as a Conservative from 1882 to 1886, and Victoria in the House of Commons of Canada from 1887 to 1896. Although a Conservative, he ran as a Liberal in a November 1887 by-election resulting from his election at the general election the previous March having been declared void, and thus sat as such from November 1887 to March 1891.

He was born in North East Margaree, Nova Scotia, the son of Laughlin McDonald, a Scottish immigrant. He was educated at the Horton Academy and then Acadia College. McDonald was called to the Nova Scotia bar in 1877. In 1885, he married Katie Jeannette Hume. He represented Victoria County in the Nova Scotia House of Assembly from 1882 to 1886 as a Conservative. McDonald was also a trustee for the Baddeck Academy and municipal clerk for Victoria. His election to the House of Commons in 1887 was declared void and he was elected as a Liberal later that year. McDonald was elected as a Conservative in the 1891 general election. That election was declared void but he was elected again in the subsequent by-election.

By-election on 21 November 1887 On election being declared void
Party	Candidate	Votes
Liberal	John Archibald McDonald	960
Conservative	Charles James Campbell	398

1891 Canadian federal election: Victoria, Nova Scotia
Party	Candidate	Votes
Conservative	John Archibald McDonald	822
Liberal	William Ross	770

By-election on 26 January 1892 On election being declared void
Party	Candidate	Votes
Conservative	John Archibald McDonald	acclaimed
