= George Albertus Cox =

Canadian politician (1840–1914)

The Honourable George Albertus Cox
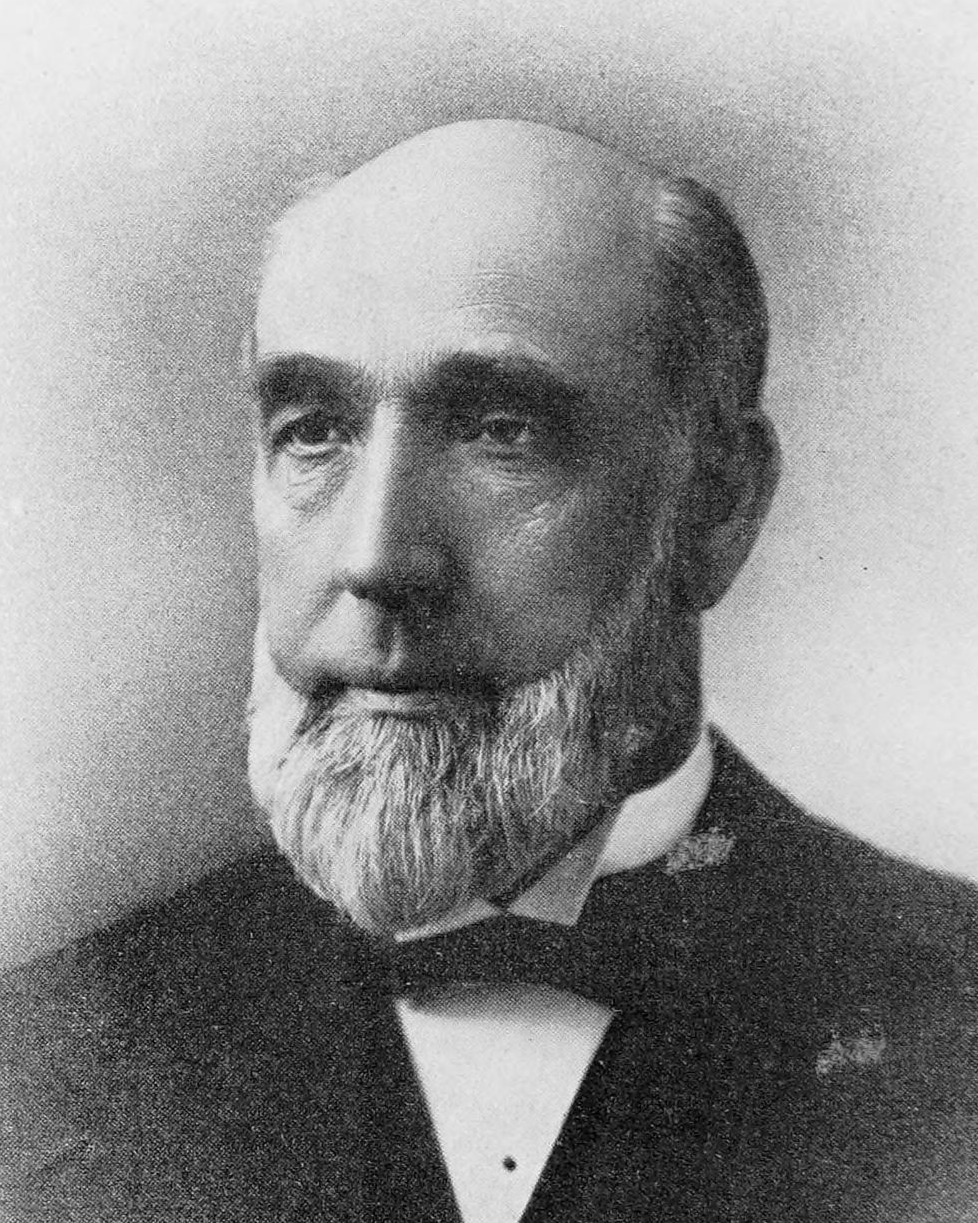

Canadian Senator from Ontario
- In office November 13, 1896 – January 16, 1914
- Appointed by: Wilfrid Laurier

Member of the Ontario Provincial Parliament for Peterborough West
- In office January 18, 1875 – September 27, 1875
- Preceded by: Thomas McCulloch Fairbairn
- Succeeded by: William Hepburn Scott

Personal details
- Born: May 7, 1840 Colborne, Upper Canada
- Died: January 16, 1914 (aged 73) Toronto, Ontario, Canada
- Party: Liberal

George Albertus Cox (7 May 1840 – 16 January 1914) was a Canadian businessman and politician.

== Life and career ==
He was born in Colborne, Upper Canada, in 1840. He began work as a telegrapher for the Montreal Telegraph Company (acquired by the Great North Western Telegraph Company in 1881 and finally merged into Canadian National Telegraph in 1915) and became their agent in Peterborough, Ontario. In 1861, he became an agent for the Canada Life Assurance Company. He served seven years as mayor of Peterborough and accumulated real estate in that area.

In 1878, he became president of the Midland Railway of Canada, later leasing it to the Grand Trunk Railway. In 1884, he founded the Central Canada Loan and Savings Company, moving to Toronto in 1888 and becoming president of the Canadian Bank of Commerce in 1890.

During the 1890s, he was involved in the purchase of the Toronto Globe and the Toronto Evening Star. In 1896, he was appointed to the Senate of Canada by Sir Wilfrid Laurier. In 1898, Cox and Edward Rogers Wood incorporated the National Trust Company in Toronto, which became the Scotia Trust in 1997 and part of the Bank of Nova Scotia. In 1900, he became president and general manager of Canada Life Assurance. In 1901, Cox and Edward R. Wood established investment dealer Dominion Securities Corporation Limited, today a part of the Royal Bank of Canada.

By this time, he controlled many of the important Canadian companies in the insurance and finance sectors. His companies helped finance the Canadian Northern Railway, the Crow's Nest Pass Coal Company, and utilities developments in Brazil which became consolidated under Brazilian Traction, Light and Power Company. Cox was one of the few Canadian millionaires of his era. A number of notable Canadians got their start in Cox companies: William Thomas White, James Henry Gundy, Edward Robert Peacock, and Frank Porter Wood, the younger brother of Edward Rogers Wood.

He was also a member of the Executive Committee of the Victorian Order of Nurses, a founding member of the Canadian Red Cross and an active member of the Methodist Church. He died in Toronto in 1914 and was buried in Mount Pleasant Cemetery, Toronto.

== Electoral history ==
1875 Ontario general election: Peterborough West
Party	Candidate	Votes	%	±%
Liberal	George Albertus Cox	970	51.19	
Conservative	William Hepburn Scott	925	48.81	−1.53
Total valid votes		1,895	71.27	
Eligible voters		2,659		
Election voided
Source: Elections Ontario

Ontario provincial by-election, October 1875: Peterborough West Previous election voided
Party	Candidate	Votes	%	±%
Conservative	William Hepburn Scott	995	50.03	−0.32
Liberal	George Albertus Cox	994	49.97	
Total valid votes		1,989		
Conservative hold		Swing		−0.32
Source: History of the Electoral Districts, Legislatures and Ministries of the Province of Ontario

== Bibliography ==
- Marchildon, Gregory P.; Duncan McDowall (1992). Canadian Multinationals and International Finance. London: Routledge. p. 184. ISBN 0-7146-3481-6, ISBN 978-0-7146-3481-4.
