= Niagara (federal electoral district) =

Electoral district in Ontario, Canada

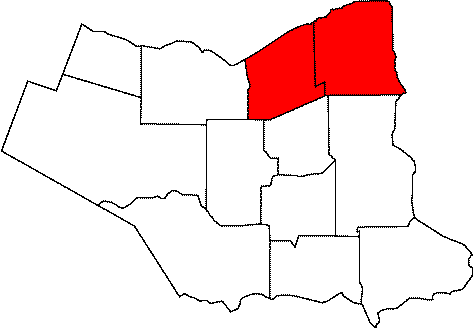
Niagara electoral district compared to modern Niagara Regional Municipality

Niagara was a federal electoral district in the Canadian province of Ontario, which was represented in the House of Commons of Canada from 1867 to 1883. It is sometimes also considered one of Ontario's historic counties, as it was listed in some post-Confederation census records as a county of residence.

Niagara consisted of the Lincoln County townships of Niagara and Grantham, including the towns of Niagara-on-the-Lake and St. Catharines.

The electoral district was abolished in 1882 when it was merged into Lincoln and Niagara riding.

== Members of Parliament ==
This riding has elected the following members of Parliament:

| Parliament | Years | Member | Party |
|---|---|---|---|
| 1st | 1867–1872 | Angus Morrison | Conservative |
| 2nd | 1872–1874 | Angus Morrison | Conservative |
| 3rd | 1874–1874 | Josiah Burr Plumb | Conservative |
| 3rd | 1874–1878 | Josiah Burr Plumb | Conservative |
| 4th | 1878–1879 | Patrick Hughes | Liberal |
| 4th | 1879–1882 | Josiah Burr Plumb | Conservative |
Riding dissolved into Lincoln and Niagara

== Electoral history ==
1867 Canadian federal election
| Party | Candidate | Votes |
|---|---|---|
| Conservative | Angus Morrison | 300 |
| Unknown | William Alexander Thomson | 250 |

1872 Canadian federal election
| Party | Candidate | Votes |
|---|---|---|
| Conservative | Angus Morrison | 300 |
| Unknown | J.M Currie | 298 |

1874 Canadian federal election
| Party | Candidate | Votes |
|---|---|---|
| Conservative | Josiah Burr Plumb | 336 |
| Unknown | J.M Currie | 306 |

On election being declared void:

By-election on 22 December 1874
| Party | Candidate | Votes |
| Conservative | Josiah Burr Plumb | 354 |
| Unknown | Solomon John Johnson Brown | 251 |

1878 Canadian federal election
| Party | Candidate | Votes |
|---|---|---|
| Liberal | Patrick Hughes | 312 |
| Conservative | Josiah Burr Plumb | 310 |

On election being declared void:

By-election on 20 March 1879
| Party | Candidate | Votes |
| Conservative | PLUMB, Josiah Burr | 310 |
| Liberal | HUGHES, Patrick | 308 |

Mr. Hughes was disqualified; subsequently the Court struck off four votes from Mr. Hughes' list for bribery, thus giving the seat to Mr. Plumb by a majority of two.

== See also ==
- List of Canadian electoral districts
- Historical federal electoral districts of Canada
