= Charles Perry (Canadian politician) =

Canadian politician

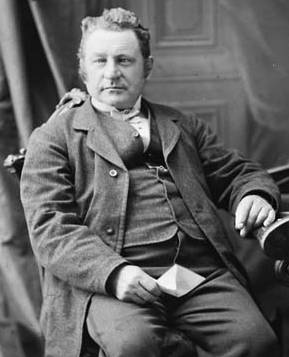

Member of Parliament for Peterborough West

Personal details
- Born: 7 December 1818 Cobourg, Upper Canada
- Died: 7 July 1876 (aged 57) Peterborough, Ontario
- Party: Conservative

Charles Perry (7 December 1818 – 7 July 1876) was a Canadian businessman and political figure. He was a Conservative member of the 1st Canadian Parliament representing Peterborough West.

He was born in Cobourg, the son of Ebenezer Perry. He entered the timber trade, purchasing land in the Peterborough area and building a large sawmill on the current site of Trent University in 1854. Perry served as mayor of Peterborough in 1853 and from 1861 to 1865. He was an unsuccessful candidate for a seat in the legislative assembly for the Province of Canada in a by-election held in 1864. Perry was a customs collector at Peterborough from 1873 to 1876 and died in Peterborough in the latter year.
