= John Bertram =

Canadian politician (1837–1904)

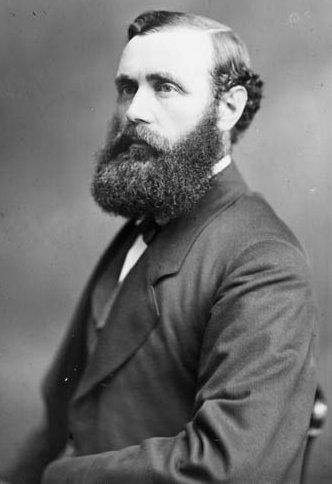

Member of the Canadian Parliament for Peterborough West
- In office 1872–1878
- Preceded by: Charles Perry
- Succeeded by: George Hilliard

Personal details
- Born: October 16, 1837 Fenton Barns, Scotland
- Died: November 28, 1904 (aged 67) Toronto, Ontario
- Party: Liberal
- Relations: George Hope Bertram, brother

John Bertram (16 October 1837 – 28 November 1904) was a businessman and a Member of Parliament in Canada.

Bertram was born at Fenton Barns, near Dirleton, Scotland, to Hugh Bertram and Isabella Mack. Bertram emigrated to Canada in 1860. He married Helen Shiells in Almonte Ontario and settled in Peterborough, Ontario where he was a wholesale hardware dealer. From 1872 to 1878, he represented Peterborough West as a Liberal in the House of Commons.

In 1881, Bertram moved to Toronto and became prominent as president of the Collins Inlet Lumber Company and as president of the Bertram Engine and Shipbuilding Company, a firm he ran with his brother George Hope Bertram (who was also an MP). Bertram was well known in public life and was chairman of the Dominion Commission on Transportation and, in 1897, he became a member of the Ontario Forestry Commission.

Bertram died in Toronto and was buried in Little Lake Cemetery in Peterborough. While in Peterborough, Bertram had converted from Presbyterianism to Unitarianism, although his wife had not. A minister of each faith officiated at his funeral.
