= John Hampden Burnham =

Canadian politician and lawyer (1860–1940)

Member of the Canadian Parliament for Peterborough West
- In office 1911–1921
- Preceded by: James Robert Stratton
- Succeeded by: George Newcombe Gordon

Personal details
- Born: October 14, 1860 Peterborough, Canada West
- Died: April 25, 1940 (aged 79)
- Party: Conservative Party (1908-1917) and (1921-), Independent (1921-), Unionist (1917-1921), independent (1921)
- Occupation: lawyer

John Hampden Burnham (born October 14, 1860 in Peterborough, Canada West-died April 25, 1940) was a politician and lawyer. He was elected to the House of Commons of Canada as a Member of the Conservative Party in the election of 1911 to represent the riding of Peterborough West after being defeated in the election of 1908.

Between 1916 and 1918, Burnham served overseas as a captain of the 93rd Battalion of the Canadian Expeditionary Force. He was also the author of Canadians in the Imperial Naval and Military Service Abroad.

He was re-elected in the 1917 election as a Unionist. Burham quit the government party on July 15, 1920 to sit as an Independent Conservative in protest of Arthur Meighen's attempt to make the Unionist government which had been formed during the Conscription Crisis of 1917 as a coalition of Conservatives and pro-conscription Liberals into a permanent political party, called the National Liberal and Conservative Party. Several months later he resigned his seat in the House of Commons and ran for re-election as an Independent Conservative in a February 7, 1921 by-election in hopes of demonstrating that public opinion supported him.

Burham argued that the Meighen government "is the creature of some big schemes now floating in the air and I believe it is a positive danger to Canada... I am unalterably opposed to this combination at Ottawa and will never rest until I see those who are attempting to wreck the old parties, whose backing and policies are known and understood, are themselves wrecked."

He lost the by-election and ran again as a straight Conservative in the 1921 general election in December but was again defeated. With the defeat of the Meighen government, Burnham called upon the party to hold a national leadership convention, abandon the "National Liberal and Conservative Party" concept and return to its old Conservative form.
