= Victoria (Nova Scotia federal electoral district) =

Former federal electoral district in Nova Scotia, Canada

Nova Scotia electoral district

Defunct federal electoral district
- Legislature: House of Commons
- District created: 1867
- District abolished: 1903
- First contested: 1867
- Last contested: 1900

Demographics
- Census division(s): Victoria

Victoria was a federal electoral district in Nova Scotia, Canada, that was represented in the House of Commons of Canada from 1867 to 1904. It was created by the British North America Act, 1867. It consisted of the County of Victoria. It was abolished in 1903 when it was merged into North Cape Breton and Victoria electoral district.

== Members of Parliament ==
This riding elected the following members of Parliament:

Parliament	Years	Member	Party
Victoria
1st	1867–1869	William Ross	Anti-Confederation
1st	1869–1872	William Ross	Liberal
2nd	1872–1873	William Ross	Liberal
2nd	1873–1874	William Ross	Liberal
3rd	1874–1874	William Ross	Liberal
3rd	1874–1875	Charles James Campbell	Conservative
3rd	1875–1876	Barclay Edmund Tremaine	Liberal
3rd	1876–1878	Charles James Campbell	Conservative
4th	1878–1882	Duncan McDonald	Liberal
5th	1882–1887	Charles James Campbell	Conservative
6th	1887–1887	Charles James Campbell	Conservative
6th	1887–1891	John Archibald McDonald	Liberal
7th	1891–1892	John Archibald McDonald	Conservative
7th	1892–1896	John Archibald McDonald	Conservative
8th	1896–1900	John Lemuel Bethune	Conservative
9th	1900–1904	William Ross	Liberal
Riding dissolved into North Cape Breton and Victoria

== Election results ==
1867 Canadian federal election: Victoria, Nova Scotia
Party	Candidate	Votes
Anti-Confederation	William Ross	acclaimed
Source: Canadian Elections Database

1872 Canadian federal election: Victoria (Nova Scotia)
Party	Candidate	Votes
Liberal	William Ross	acclaimed
Source: Canadian Elections Database

Canadian federal by-election, 20 December 1873 On Mr. Ross being appointed Minister of Militia, 7 November 1873
Party	Candidate	Votes
Liberal	William Ross	541
Conservative	Charles James Campbell	523
Source: lop.parl.ca

1874 Canadian federal election: Victoria, Nova Scotia
Party	Candidate	Votes
Liberal	William Ross	acclaimed
Source: open.canada.ca

Canadian federal by-election, 17 December 1874 On Mr. Ross' resignation
Party	Candidate	Votes
Conservative	Charles James Campbell	541
Liberal	Barclay Edmund Tremaine	523
By-election On Mr. Ross' resignation, 29 September 1874, to become Collector of Customs at Halifax, N.S., 5 November 1874.
Source: lop.parl.ca

Canadian federal by-election, 28 April 1875 On Mr. Campbell being unseated by court decision
Party	Candidate	Votes
Liberal	Barclay Edmund Tremaine	Acclaimed
On Mr. Campbell being unseated by decision of the Supreme Court of N.S., 28 February 1875. Mr. B.E. Tremaine was declared duly elected by decision of Election Court, 28 April 1875.
Source: lop.parl.ca

Canadian federal by-election, 21 September 1876 On Mr. Tremaine's resignation
Party	Candidate	Votes
Conservative	Charles James Campbell	624
Liberal	John Ross	526
On Mr. Tremaine's resignation, 21 August 1876, to become County Court Judge of District No. 7 Cape Breton, 21 August 1876.
Source: lop.parl.ca

1878 Canadian federal election: Victoria, Nova Scotia
Party	Candidate	Votes
Liberal	Duncan McDonald	748
Conservative	Charles James Campbell	645

1882 Canadian federal election: Victoria, Nova Scotia
Party	Candidate	Votes
Conservative	Charles James Campbell	857
Conservative	J.T. Bethune	544

1887 Canadian federal election: Victoria, Nova Scotia
Party	Candidate	Votes
Conservative	Charles James Campbell	830
Liberal	W.F. McCurdy	777

Canadian federal by-election, 21 November 1887 On election being declared void
Party	Candidate	Votes
Liberal	John Archibald McDonald	960
Conservative	Charles James Campbell	398
Source: lop.parl.ca

1891 Canadian federal election: Victoria, Nova Scotia
Party	Candidate	Votes
Conservative	John Archibald McDonald	822
Liberal	William Ross	770

Canadian federal by-election, 26 January 1892 On election being declared void
Party	Candidate	Votes
Conservative	John Archibald McDonald	acclaimed
Source: lop.parl.ca

1896 Canadian federal election: Victoria, Nova Scotia
Party	Candidate	Votes
Conservative	John Lemuel Bethune	1,049
Liberal	S.C. Campbell	877

1900 Canadian federal election: Victoria, Nova Scotia
Party	Candidate	Votes
Liberal	William Ross	1,072
Conservative	Duncan A. McCaskill	785

== See also ==
- List of Canadian electoral districts
- Historical federal electoral districts of Canada
