= Thomas McCulloch Fairbairn =

Canadian politician (1840–1874)

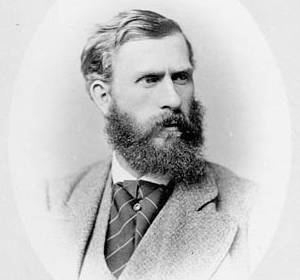

Ontario MPP
- In office 1871–1874
- Preceded by: John Carnegie
- Succeeded by: George Albertus Cox
- Constituency: Peterborough West

Personal details
- Born: April 19, 1840; Bowmanville, Upper Canada
- Died: May 13, 1874 (aged 34); Jacksonville, Florida
- Political party: Liberal
- Spouses: Elfrida Armour (m. 1864–1865) Jane Roger (m. 1866)

Thomas McCullouch Fairbairn (April 19, 1840 – May 13, 1874) was a Canadian lawyer and politician. He represented Peterborough West in the Legislative Assembly of Ontario from 1871 to 1874.

Fairbairn was born in Bowmanville in 1840, the son of a Scottish immigrant. He articled in law and was called to the bar in 1865. In 1864, Fairbairn married Elfrida Armour and then, in 1866, Jane Roger after Elfrida's death. He practiced law in Peterborough. He was elected to the Ontario legislature in 1871 for the Reform Party and died in Jacksonville, Florida while still in office, likely of consumption.

His son, John Morrice Roger Fairbairn, became chief engineer for the Canadian Pacific Railway.

== Electoral history ==
1871 Ontario general election: Peterborough West
| Party | Candidate | Votes | % | ±% |
|---|---|---|---|---|
| Liberal | Thomas McCulloch Fairbairn | 648 | 52.13 | +2.81 |
| Conservative | John Carnegie | 595 | 47.87 | −2.81 |
| Turnout | | 1,243 | 69.91 | −8.59 |
| Eligible voters | | 1,778 | | |
| Liberal gain from Conservative | | Swing | | +2.81 |
Source: Elections Ontario
