= Thomas Evans Bradburn =

Canadian politician (1853–1933)

Ontario MPP
- In office 1905–1911
- Preceded by: James Robert Stratton
- Succeeded by: Edward Armour Peck
- Constituency: Peterborough West

Personal details
- Born: May 19, 1853 Peterborough, Canada West
- Died: November 16, 1933 (aged 80) Peterborough, Ontario
- Party: Conservative
- Spouse: Catherine Ormond (m. 1874)
- Occupation: Businessman

Thomas Evans Bradburn (May 19, 1853 – November 16, 1933) was a business owner and politician in Ontario, Canada. He was first elected to legislature as the representative of Peterborough West in the Legislative Assembly of Ontario in 1905 as a Conservative, and served until 1911.

The son of Thomas Bradburn and Jane Morrow, he was born in Peterborough and was educated there. Bradburn began work as a clerk in the family business; he then became manager for the branch of the business located in Lindsay. In 1877, with a partner, he purchased his father's business. In 1887, he left the partnership, returned to Peterborough and set up a real estate and insurance business. Bradburn was president of the Peterborough Electric Light and Power Company and of the Peterborough Sugar Company. He also served on Peterborough town council, was reeve of Monaghan township and was a member of the Board of Education.

In 1874, Bradburn married Catherine Ormond.

Bradburn paid for the construction of the Bradburn Opera House; the opera house opened in 1876. It was demolished in 1974 when the Peterborough Square mall was built.

His former home, known as Bradburn House was used as an orphanage and later as a nursing home. Then, it was used as a student residence by Trent University. Most recently, it was converted into affordable housing by the Peterborough Housing Corporation.
