= Angus Morrison (politician) =

Canadian politician

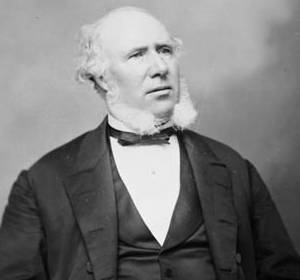

21st Mayor of Toronto
- In office 1876–1878
- Preceded by: Francis Henry Medcalf
- Succeeded by: James Beaty, Jr.

Member of Parliament for Niagara
- In office September 20, 1867 – January 21, 1874
- Preceded by: Riding established
- Succeeded by: Josiah Burr Plumb

Personal details
- Born: January 20, 1822 Edinburgh, Scotland
- Died: June 10, 1882 (aged 60) Toronto, Ontario, Canada
- Party: Conservative

Angus Morrison, QC (January 20, 1822 – June 10, 1882) was a Canadian lawyer and political figure in Ontario. He represented Niagara in the House of Commons of Canada as a Conservative member from 1867 to 1874. He served as the 21st Mayor of Toronto from 1876 to 1878. He was also a member of the Orange Order in Canada.

He was born in Edinburgh, Scotland in 1822 and came to Upper Canada with his father in 1830; they later moved to York (Toronto). Morrison joined the law office of his older brother, Joseph, as a clerk in 1839, was called to the bar in 1845 and opened his own practice in Toronto. He was elected to city council in 1853 and 1854. He was elected to the Legislative Assembly of the Province of Canada in the North riding of Simcoe in 1854; he was reelected in 1857 and 1861. He was elected in an 1864 by-election to represent Niagara. He was elected to represent Niagara in the federal parliament in 1867, serving until his defeat in the 1874 general election. During his time in office, Morrison helped promote the development of transportation links within the province. In 1873, he was named Queen's Counsel. During his time as mayor, he helped establish the Credit Valley Railway and negotiated an agreement with Ottawa to have the city take over the exhibition grounds. He died in Toronto in 1882.

1867 Canadian federal election: Niagara
Party	Candidate	Votes
Conservative	Angus Morrison	300
Unknown	William Alexander Thomson	250

1872 Canadian federal election: Niagara
Party	Candidate	Votes
Conservative	Angus Morrison	300
Unknown	J.M Currie	298
