= James Stevenson (Canadian politician) =

Canadian politician

James Stevenson (August 1, 1827 – October 26, 1910) was an Irish-born merchant and political figure in Ontario, Canada. He represented Peterborough West in the House of Commons of Canada from 1887 to 1896 as a Conservative member.

He was born in County Fermanagh, the son of William Stevenson and Mary Rowe, and went to Port Hope, Upper Canada with his parents in 1840. Stevenson came to Peterborough in 1843, where he found work as a clerk for a stove and tinware business, later becoming manager and finally purchasing the business. In 1858, he married Emma Appleton. In 1873, he sold the business and became involved in the trade in wool, grain and farm produce. Stevenson was a member of the council for Peterborough town and Peterborough County, also serving as mayor of Peterborough for six years. He was chairman of the school board, chairman of the Town Trust and a justice of the peace. Stevenson was also president of the Peterborough Gas Company and a director of the Port Hope Midland Railway.
