= Tom Bradburn =

Scottish cricketer

Personal information
- Full name: Tom Bradburn

International information
- National side: Scotland
- Source: Cricinfo, 10 June 2019

Tom Bradburn is a Scottish cricketer. In June 2019, he was selected to represent Scotland A in their tour to Ireland to play the Ireland Wolves. He made his Twenty20 debut for Scotland A against the Ireland Wolves on 10 June 2019.
