= James Kendry =

Canadian politician (1845–1918)

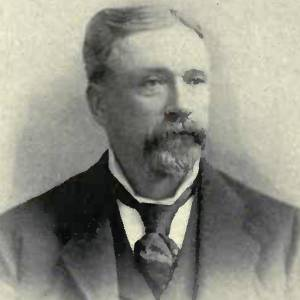
James Kendry

James Kendry (March 29, 1845 – November 4, 1918) was a woolen manufacturer and political figure in Ontario, Canada. He represented Peterborough West in the House of Commons of Canada from 1896 to 1904 as a Conservative.

He was born in Oshawa, Canada West and was educated there. Kendry was manager of the Clyde Woolen Mills in Lanark. In 1879, he became manager of the Auburn Woollen Mills in Peterborough and later became an owner. Kendry was mayor of Peterborough from 1892 to 1896. He was defeated when he ran for reelection to the House of Commons in 1904. He died in Peterborough at the age of 73.
