= Joseph James Duffus =

Canadian politician (1876–1957)

Joseph James Duffus (June 17, 1876 – February 7, 1957) was a Canadian merchant and parliamentarian.

Born and raised in Peterborough, Ontario, Duffus was a graduate of the Royal School of Cavalry and Royal School of Infantry and in his career was a soldier, farmer and businessman.

He served with the 3rd Prince of Wales Canadian Dragoons and the 247th Regiment and with the Canadian Coronation Contingent and rose to the rank of lieutenant colonel and then colonel.

Duffus was a merchant and building contractor by trade and was active in politics and was elected to Peterborough's city council in 1909 after two unsuccessful attempts. He served as an alderman for six years before being elected mayor in 1916 and 1917. He also served as president of the Peterborough Chamber of Commerce.

He attempted to win a seat in the House of Commons of Canada in the 1926 and 1930 federal elections but was defeated in both attempts.

He was elected the Liberal Member of Parliament for Peterborough West in the 1935 federal election and was summoned to the Senate of Canada in 1940 prior to the 1940 election in order to free his seat up for Roland Maxwell Glover, publisher of the Peterborough Examiner; Glover was defeated in the general election.

Duffus died in office in 1957 after a lengthy illness. His two-year absence from the Senate prior to his death led to an attempt to have the Senator removed from office under the provisions of the BNA Act that allowed a Senate seat to be declared vacant if its occupant missed two successive sessions.
