= William Ross (Canadian politician) =

Canadian politician

The Honourable William Ross PC
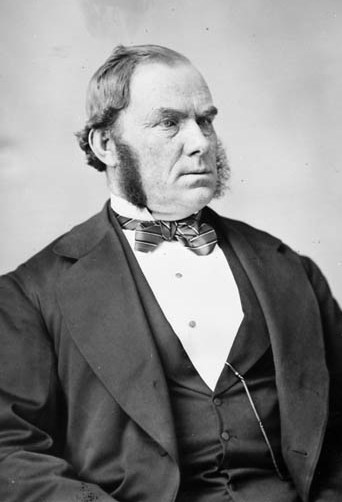

Senator for Victoria, Nova Scotia
- In office May 18, 1905 – March 17, 1912
- Appointed by: Wilfrid Laurier

Member of the Canadian Parliament for Victoria, Nova Scotia
- In office 1867–1874
- Succeeded by: Charles James Campbell
- In office 1900–1904
- Preceded by: John Lemuel Bethune
- Succeeded by: Electoral district was abolished in 1903

Personal details
- Born: December 20, 1824 Boularderie, Nova Scotia, Canada
- Died: March 17, 1912 (aged 87) Ottawa, Ontario, Canada
- Party: Anti-Confederate (1867-1869); Liberal
- Spouse: Eliza Moore
- Cabinet: Minister of Militia and Defence (1873-1874)

William Ross (December 20, 1824 – March 17, 1912) was a Canadian politician.

Born on Boularderie Island, Nova Scotia, the son of John Ross, a Scottish immigrant, and Robina McKenzie, Ross was a merchant and shipbuilder. In 1855, he married Eliza Moore. He represented Victoria County in the Nova Scotia House of Assembly from 1857 to 1867. He was elected to the 1st Canadian Parliament in 1867. From 1873 to 1874, he was the Minister of Militia and Defence. Ross resigned his seat in the House of Commons in 1874 after he was named customs collector for Halifax and served until 1888. Ross was made a Privy Councillor in 1873

Ross also served as a Lieutenant-colonel in the Cape Breton Militia.

In 1905, he was summoned to the Senate of Canada representing the senatorial division of Victoria, Nova Scotia. A Liberal, he served until his death in 1912.

== Electoral record ==
1867 Canadian federal election: Victoria, Nova Scotia
Party	Candidate	Votes
Anti-Confederation	William Ross	acclaimed
Source: Canadian Elections Database

1872 Canadian federal election: Victoria (Nova Scotia)
Party	Candidate	Votes
Liberal	William Ross	acclaimed
Source: Canadian Elections Database

Canadian federal by-election, 20 December 1873: Victoria, Nova Scotia On Mr. Ross being appointed Minister of Militia, 7 November 1873
Party	Candidate	Votes
Liberal	William Ross	541
Conservative	Charles James Campbell	523
Source: lop.parl.ca

1874 Canadian federal election: Victoria, Nova Scotia
Party	Candidate	Votes
Liberal	William Ross	acclaimed
Source: open.canada.ca

1900 Canadian federal election: Victoria, Nova Scotia
Party	Candidate	Votes
Liberal	William Ross	1,072
Conservative	Duncan A. McCaskill	785
