= Michaud =

Michaud is a surname of French origin, most often found in France, Canada and the United States. Notable people with the surname include:

- Alexandre Michaud de Beauretour (1771–1841), Piedmontese general who served in the Imperial Russian Army
- Alexis Michaud (born 1975), French linguist
- Alfie Michaud (born 1976), Canadian ice hockey player
- Alice Morel-Michaud (born 1998), Canadian actress
- Andrée A. Michaud (born 1957), Canadian novelist and playwright
- Benoît Michaud (1902–1949), Canadian lawyer, notary, judge and politician
- Bruno Michaud (1935–1997), Swiss football player and manager
- Cédric Michaud (born 1976), French marathon speed skater
- Charles-Olivier Michaud (born 1979), Canadian writer, film director and producer
- Claude Ignace François Michaud (1751–1835), French general
- Claude Michaud (1935–2014), French economist
- David Michaud (born 1988), American MMA fighter
- Denis Michaud (born 1946), Canadian Olympic luger
- Didier Michaud-Daniel (born 1958), French business executive
- Élaine Michaud (born 1985), Canadian politician
- Ernest Michaud (1884–1939), French trade union leader
- Hervé Michaud (1912–1978), Canadian politician
- Jacques Michaud (born 1951), French cyclist
- Jean Le Michaud d'Arçon (1733–1800), French general
- Jeff Michaud (born 1993), American soccer player
- John Stephen Michaud (1843–1908), American prelate of the Roman Catholic Church, Bishop of Burlington from 1899
- Joseph-Enoil Michaud (1888–1967), Canadian lawyer and politician
- Joseph François Michaud (1767–1839), French historian and publicist
- Joseph Michaud (Ontario politician) (1857–?), Canadian politician
- Julien Michaud (born 1979), French para table tennis player
- Kristina Michaud (born 1992/1993), Canadian politician
- Louis André Gaspard Michaud (1795–1880), French malacologist, known also as Gaspard Michaud or A. L. G. Michaud
- Louis Gabriel Michaud (1773–1858), French writer, historian, printer, and bookseller
- Maude Michaud (born 1986), Canadian screenwriter, filmmaker and actress
- Michel Michaud (born 1946), French chef working in Denmark
- Mike Michaud (born 1955), U.S. Congressman
- Mike Michaud (executive), co-founder of American online media production company Channel Awesome
- Olivier Michaud (born 1983), Canadian ice hockey player
- Patrice Michaud (born 1980), Canadian singer-songwriter
- Pierre Michaud (1936–2023), Canadian lawyer and judge, Chief Justice of Quebec from 1994 to 2002
- Pius Michaud (1870–1956), Canadian lawyer and politician
- Ronald Michaud, 20th-century American cartoonist
- Sébastien Michaud (born 1987), Canadian Olympic taekwondo practitioner
- Stéphane Michaud (born 1944), French literary scholar
- Trennt Michaud (born 1996), Canadian pair skater
- Valérie Michaud (born 1970), French golfer
- Yves Michaud (politician) (born 1930), Canadian journalist and politician
- Yves Michaud (philosopher) (born 1944), French philosopher

== See also ==
- Michaud Affair
- Michaud River
- Michaux (disambiguation)
