= Narcisse A. Gagnon =

Former Canadian politician

Member of the Legislative Assembly of New Brunswick
- In office 1899–1903 Serving with Frederick LaForest, Thomas Clair
- Constituency: Madawaska

Personal details
- Born: February 11, 1835 Rivière-Ouelle, Lower Canada
- Died: November 20, 1903 (aged 68) Saint-Basile, New Brunswick
- Party: New Brunswick Liberal Association
- Spouse: Christine
- Occupation: Merchant, educator

Narcisse A. Gagnon (February 11, 1835 – November 20, 1903) was a Canadian politician. He served in the Legislative Assembly of New Brunswick as a member from Madawaska County.
