= Michaux =

Michaux may refer to:

== Places ==
- Michaux, Virginia
- Michaux State Forest, a Pennsylvania state forest

== Other uses ==
- Michaux (surname), a French surname
- Elder Michaux, an American television series

== See also ==
- Michaud
- Micheaux
