= CEDEP-1 =

General information
- Type: UAV
- National origin: Peru
- Manufacturer: CEDEP - (Peruvian Air Force Project Development Centre
- Number built: ≥1 (prototype)

CEDEP-1 is an experimental unmanned aerial vehicle (UAV) developed by the Project Development Center (CEDEP) of the Peruvian Air Force.

== Design and development ==
Funding is currently being provided through the Ministry of Defence and a grant from the National Council of Science and Technology (Concytec). The aircraft is equipped with optical and infrared sensing technologies, with real-time communication to a ground station. In 2008, a prototype made a first test flight at Las Palmas Air Force Base. Since then, a scale prototype has successfully made more than 20 flights in and around the resort of Chorrillos. It has been reported that this aircraft has been used to support counter-terrorism operations in the Valley of Apurímac and Ene River (VRAE).
