= Jean Bounine-Cabalé =

French businessman and consultant

- Born: 1 September 1923; Djidjelli, Algeria
- Died: 9 March 2007 (aged 83); Neuilly-sur-Seine, France
- Education: Ecole polytechnique
- Occupations: Author; Management consultant Engineer

Jean Bounine-Cabalé (French pronunciation: [ʒɑ̃ bunin kabale]; 1 September 1923 – 9 March 2007) was a French businessman and consultant. He wrote several economic books.

== Life and work ==
Bounine-Cabalé was born on 1 September 1923 in Djidjelli, Algeria. Son of a director of public school, Jean Bounine-Cabalé attended the Ecole polytechnique, where he graduated in 1948. He was successively an engineer at the Japy Frères (1948–50), Strafor-Maroc (1950–56), an independent consulting engineer (since 1957), advisor to the Chairman of L'Oreal (1960–90), founder (1971) and Chairman of the Supervisory Board of Novaction, Managing Director (1982) and Chairman (1992) of JB Consult and Advisor to the Chairman of Solving International.

Jean Bounine published several books in collaboration with François Dalle, Chairman of L'Oreal and a boss of the Trente Glorieuses (i.e. Post–World War II economic expansion) and François Roche, editor of the French economic newspaper Tribune Desfossés.

Bounine-Cabalé died on 9 March 2007 in Neuilly-sur-Seine.

== Awards ==
He is the Chevalier of the Légion d'Honneur and holder of the Croix de guerre 1939–1945.

== Selected publications ==
- L'Entreprise du futur (Note: On the occasion of the release of the book "L'Entreprise du Futur" by Jean Bounine Cabalé and François Dalle at Calmann-Lévy, Francois-Henri de Virieu and Thomas Hardy introduce the authors at the main news program of French TV (ORTF) at 13:00, June 22nd, 1971 (cf. archive INA)) (with François Dalle), Calmann-Lévy, (1971)
- Quand l'entreprise s'éveille à la conscience sociale, (avec François Dalle, preface de Jacques Monod), Éditions Laffont, (1975), ISBN 9782221020371
- Le Taylorisme à l'envers (avec François Dalle et Bruno Lussato), Institut de l'entreprise, (1977), ISBN 9782902619030
- Télématique ou privatique ?, Éditions d'Informatique, (1977), ISBN 2-901001-13-0
- Produire juste à temps (avec Kiyoshi Suzaki), (1986), ISBN 9782225843655
- Pour développer l'emploi (rapport à Monsieur le Ministre des affaires sociales et de l'emploi), Editions Masson Paris, (1987), ISBN 9782225813092
- Un projet pour le textile-habillement français, rapport remis à Roger Fauroux (1989)
- L'Éducation en entreprise. Contre le chômage des jeunes, Éditions Odile Jacob, (1993), ISBN 2738101992
- Le Sursaut (avec François Dalle), Calmann-Lévy Paris, (1994), ISBN 9782702123454
- Vérités sur les 35 heures, (Note: Les témoignages recueillis par l'auteur auprès de dirigeants permettent d'affirmer que "...les créations d'emplois déclarées par les entreprises passées aux 35 heures ont été pour l'essentiel, dues, à la conjoncture des années 1999 et 2000 et non pas à la loi Aubry. Cette loi n'aurait donc pas atteint son objectif visant à créer des emplois... Malgré les aides offertes par le gouvernement, les dirigeants ont résolu, en majorité, de renoncer à la croissance...") Rocher, (2002), ISBN 9782268044323
