= Victoria (New Brunswick federal electoral district) =

Former federal electoral district in New Brunswick, Canada

New Brunswick electoral district

Defunct federal electoral district
- Legislature: House of Commons
- District created: 1867
- District abolished: 1914
- First contested: 1867
- Last contested: 1911

Demographics
- Census division: Victoria

Victoria was a federal electoral district in New Brunswick, Canada, that was represented in the House of Commons of Canada from 1867 to 1917.

It was created by the British North America Act 1867, and was re-distributed in 1914 into Restigouche—Madawaska and Victoria—Carleton ridings.

The riding's boundaries were the same as those of Victoria County, New Brunswick, and were not adjusted during the period that the riding existed.

== Members of Parliament ==
This riding elected the following members of Parliament:

Parliament	Years	Member	Party
Victoria
1st	1867–1872	John Costigan	Liberal–Conservative
2nd	1872–1874	John Costigan	Liberal–Conservative
3rd	1874–1878	John Costigan	Liberal–Conservative
4th	1878–1882	John Costigan	Liberal–Conservative
5th	1882–1887	John Costigan	Liberal–Conservative
6th	1887–1891	John Costigan	Liberal–Conservative
7th	1891–1896	John Costigan	Liberal–Conservative
8th	1896–1900	John Costigan	Liberal–Conservative
9th	1900–1904	John Costigan	Liberal
10th	1904–1907	John Costigan	Liberal
10th	1907–1908	Pius Michaud	Liberal
11th	1908–1911	Pius Michaud	Liberal
12th	1911–1917	Pius Michaud	Liberal
Riding dissolved into Victoria—Carleton and Restigouche—Madawaska

== Electoral history ==
=== 1911 ===
1911 Canadian federal election
Party	Candidate	Votes
Liberal	Pius Michaud	3,059
Conservative	Maximilien Dominic Cormier	1,111

=== 1908 ===
1908 Canadian federal election
Party	Candidate	Votes
Liberal	Pius Michaud	2,611
Conservative	Clarence A. Kirkpatrick	728

=== 1907 by-election ===
Canadian federal by-election, 15 January 1907 Due to John Costigan's call to the Senate
Party	Candidate	Votes
Liberal	Pius Michaud	acclaimed

=== 1904 ===
1904 Canadian federal election
Party	Candidate	Votes
Liberal	John Costigan	2,176
Conservative	Judson C. Manzer	988

=== 1900 ===
1900 Canadian federal election
Party	Candidate	Votes
Liberal	John Costigan	acclaimed

=== 1896 ===
1896 Canadian federal election
Party	Candidate	Votes
Liberal–Conservative	John Costigan	1,864
Liberal	Frederick LaForest	1,318

=== 1891 ===
1891 Canadian federal election
Party	Candidate	Votes
Liberal–Conservative	John Costigan	1,427
Liberal	Thomas Lawson	732

=== 1887 ===
1887 Canadian federal election
Party	Candidate	Votes
Liberal–Conservative	John Costigan	1,286
Liberal	L. Theriault	978

=== 1882 ===
1882 Canadian federal election
Party	Candidate	Votes
Liberal–Conservative	John Costigan	acclaimed

=== 1878 ===
1878 Canadian federal election
Party	Candidate	Votes
Liberal–Conservative	John Costigan	831
Unknown	F.-X. Bernier	368

=== 1874 ===
1874 Canadian federal election
Party	Candidate	Votes
Liberal–Conservative	John Costigan	868
Unknown	F.-X. Bernier	429
Source: lop.parl.ca

=== 1872 ===
1872 Canadian federal election
Party	Candidate	Votes
Liberal–Conservative	John Costigan	1,141
Unknown	H. Bossé	279
Source: Canadian Elections Database

=== 1867 ===
1867 Canadian federal election
Party	Candidate	Votes	%
Liberal–Conservative	John Costigan	778	57.93
Unknown	William Blackwood Beveridge	549	40.88
Unknown	James Workman	16	1.19
Unknown	James Tibbetts	0	0.00
Total valid votes		1,343	83.52
Eligible voters		1,608	
Source: 1867 Return of the Elections to House of Commons

== See also ==
- List of Canadian electoral districts
- Historical federal electoral districts of Canada
