= Paterniti =

Paterniti is a surname. Notable people with the surname include:

- Giovanni Paterniti (died 1911), American diplomat
- Kelly Paterniti (born 1987), Australian actress
- Michael Paterniti, American writer
- Thomas H. Paterniti (1929–2017), American dentist and politician
