= John Costigan =

Canadian politician (1835–1916)

The Honourable John Costigan PC
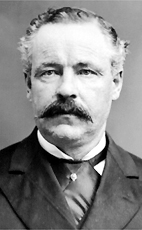

Member of the New Brunswick House of Assembly for Victoria
- In office 1862–1867

Member of Parliament for Victoria
- In office 1867–1907
- Preceded by: first member
- Succeeded by: Pius Michaud

Senator for New Brunswick
- In office January 15, 1907 – September 29, 1916

Personal details
- Born: February 1, 1835 Saint-Nicolas, Lower Canada
- Died: September 29, 1916 (aged 81) Ottawa, Ontario, Canada
- Party: Liberal-Conservative → Liberal

John Costigan PC (February 1, 1835 – September 29, 1916) was a Canadian judge and politician who served in the House of Commons of Canada and in the Cabinet of several Prime Ministers of Canada.

Costigan was born on February 1, 1835, in Saint-Nicolas, Lower Canada, the son of Irish immigrants John Costigan and Bridget Dunn. He was educated at Collège de Sainte-Anne-de-la-Pocatière in Canada East from 1850 to 1852. In 1857, he became registrar of deeds and wills for Victoria County in New Brunswick and a judge of the Inferior Court of Common Pleas. He resigned from these posts in 1861 when he was elected to be a member of the 19th New Brunswick Legislative Assembly, representing the electoral district of Victoria.

On September 20, 1867, he was elected to the 1st Canadian Parliament as a member of the Liberal-Conservative Party by the riding of Victoria in New Brunswick. He was re-elected nine times, and he became a member of the Liberal Party on February 6, 1906. During his time as a Member of Parliament, he was a Minister of Inland Revenue, a Secretary of State of Canada, a Minister of Marine and Fisheries, and an acting Minister of Trade and Commerce. He was made a Privy Councillor in 1882. He was Dean of the House from 1896 to 1907.

On January 15, 1907, he was appointed a member of the Senate of Canada for the senatorial division of Victoria, New Brunswick. He died in office on September 29, 1916, in Ottawa. He was interred in Grand Falls.

Mount Costigan in Banff National Park is named in his honor.

There is a John Costigan fonds at Library and Archives Canada.

1867 Canadian federal election: Victoria, New Brunswick
| Party | Candidate | Votes | % |
|---|---|---|---|
| Liberal–Conservative | John Costigan | 778 | 57.93 |
| Unknown | William Blackwood Beveridge | 549 | 40.88 |
| Unknown | James Workman | 16 | 1.19 |
| Unknown | James Tibbetts | 0 | 0.00 |
| Total valid votes | | 1,343 | 83.52 |
| Eligible voters | | 1,608 | |
Source: 1867 Return of the Elections to House of Commons

1872 Canadian federal election: Victoria (New Brunswick)
| Party | Candidate | Votes |
|---|---|---|
| Liberal–Conservative | John Costigan | 1,141 |
| Unknown | H. Bossé | 279 |
Source: Canadian Elections Database

1874 Canadian federal election: Victoria, New Brunswick
| Party | Candidate | Votes |
|---|---|---|
| Liberal–Conservative | John Costigan | 868 |
| Unknown | F.-X. Bernier | 429 |
Source: lop.parl.ca

1878 Canadian federal election: Victoria, New Brunswick
| Party | Candidate | Votes |
|---|---|---|
| Liberal–Conservative | John Costigan | 831 |
| Unknown | F.-X. Bernier | 368 |

1882 Canadian federal election: Victoria, New Brunswick
| Party | Candidate | Votes |
|---|---|---|
| Liberal–Conservative | John Costigan | acclaimed |

1887 Canadian federal election: Victoria, New Brunswick
| Party | Candidate | Votes |
|---|---|---|
| Liberal–Conservative | John Costigan | 1,286 |
| Liberal | L. Theriault | 978 |

1891 Canadian federal election: Victoria, New Brunswick
| Party | Candidate | Votes |
|---|---|---|
| Liberal–Conservative | John Costigan | 1,427 |
| Liberal | Thomas Lawson | 732 |

1896 Canadian federal election: Victoria, New Brunswick
| Party | Candidate | Votes |
|---|---|---|
| Liberal–Conservative | John Costigan | 1,864 |
| Liberal | Frederick LaForest | 1,318 |

1900 Canadian federal election: Victoria, New Brunswick
| Party | Candidate | Votes |
|---|---|---|
| Liberal | John Costigan | acclaimed |

1904 Canadian federal election: Victoria
| Party | Candidate | Votes |
|---|---|---|
| Liberal | John Costigan | 2,176 |
| Conservative | Judson C. Manzer | 988 |
