= Ludo Van der Heyden =

- Born: Belgium
- Known for: Organigraphs, fair process leadership
- Awards: Officer of the Order of Leopold, HHL Distinguished Service Medal

Academic background
- Education: Université Catholique de Louvain, Yale University
- Website: ludovanderheyden.com

Ludo Van der Heyden is an academic, management educator, and adviser. He is a professor at INSEAD, where he has served as co-Dean. He currently holds the INSEAD Chaired Professorship in Corporate Governance, and is a Fellow at CEDEP. His broad research interests are in fair process, leadership, and business model innovation. His teaching interests also include leadership and team dynamics, project management, and family business management.

== Career ==
Van der Heyden was on the faculty at the John F. Kennedy School of Government at Harvard University from 1978 to 1980. He subsequently became a professor at the School of Organizations and Management at Yale University from 1980 to 1988. Van der Heyden joined INSEAD's Technology Management Department in 1988. He served as co-Dean of the school from 1990 to 1995, first with Claude Rameau and secondly with Antonio Borges. Van der Heyden subsequently held the Wendel Chair in the Large Family Firm, the Solvay Chair of Technological Innovation, and the Mubadala Chair in Corporate Governance and Strategy.

== Work ==
Van der Heyden's early work was in the field of operations management. His more recent contributions cover business models, corporate governance, and organizational Fair Process. His 1999 HBR article, co-authored with Henry Mintzberg, presented a new visual tool, the organigraph, that allowed managers to identify potential opportunities for improving a firm's business. In 2008, in a paper with Christoph Loch and Yaozhong Wu, he developed a model to explain why Fair Process principles may not be applied in firms even when there is agreement that they lead to improved decision-making and execution.

In a 2009 article with Bert Spector and Jose Santos, Van der Heyden proposed a comprehensive model for understanding business model innovation, identifying four separate but interrelated components: a set of elemental activities; a set of organizational units that perform the activities (some internal to the firm, others external); a set of linkages between the activities, made explicit by transactions between organizational units and human relationships among the individuals who supervise and/or manage the linked organizational units; and a set of governance mechanisms for controlling the organizational units and the linkages between units. The paper further argues that interlinked business units are more likely to innovate business models than freestanding business units if the corporation is able to create a favorable context.

== Other Affiliations ==
Van der Heyden is a supervisory or advisory board member for several funds managed by Bencis Capital Partners. He was vice president for Pôle Sud Paris, a not-for-profit association supporting economic development in the South Paris region, and secretary general of the scientific committee of the Comité pour la Langue du Droit Européen.

== Degrees and Honors ==
Van der Heyden graduated with an engineering degree with a specialization in applied mathematics from the Université Catholique de Louvain in 1974 and obtained a PhD in administrative sciences from Yale University in 1979. He is an honorary professor at the HHL Leipzig Graduate School of Management in Leipzig and a recipient of its Distinguished Service Medal in 2003. He was made an officer of the Order of Leopold by the King of Belgium in 1996. In 2006, Van der Heyden was made an honorary alumnus of INSEAD. He has earned several Outstanding MBA Teaching Awards at INSEAD, as well as several Outstanding Service Awards to INSEAD's Executive Education.

He also featured on the list of The Case Centre's all-time top authors list (covering 40 years) released in 2014.

== Selected publications ==
- Organigraphs: Drawing How Companies Really Work, Henry Mintzberg and Ludo Van der Heyden, Harvard Business Review, September 1999
- Industrial Excellence: Management Quality in Manufacturing, Christoph H. Loch, Ludo Van der Heyden, Luk N. Van Wassenhove, Cedric Escalle, and Arnd Huchzermeier, Springer, 2003
- A Model of Fair Process and Its Limits by Yaozhong Wu, Christoph H. Loch, and Ludo Van der Heyden, Manufacturing and Service Operations Management, 2008
- Towards A Theory of Business Model Innovation Within Incumbent Firms by José Santos, Bert Spector, and Ludo Van der Heyden, INSEAD Working Paper, 2009

== Notes ==
- Organigraphs: Drawing How Companies Really Work, Henry Mintzberg and Ludo Van der Heyden, Harvard Business Review, September 1999
- A Model of Fair Process and Its Limits by Yaozhong Wu, Christoph H. Loch, and Ludo Van der Heyden, Manufacturing and Service Operations Management, 2008
- Towards A Theory of Business Model Innovation Within Incumbent Firms by José Santos, Bert Spector, and Ludo Van der Heyden, INSEAD Working Paper, 2009
