= Arthur Culligan =

Canadian politician

Arthur Patrick Culligan

MLA for Restigouche
- In office 1912–1917 Serving with David A. Stewart
- Preceded by: Charles H. LaBillois and William Currie
- Succeeded by: Arthur T. Leblanc and William Currie

Member of Parliament for Restigouche—Madawaska
- In office January 7, 1926 – July 2, 1926
- Preceded by: Pius Michaud
- Succeeded by: Stanislas Blanchard

Personal details
- Born: July 29, 1878 Belledune, New Brunswick, Canada
- Died: March 9, 1929 (aged 50)
- Party: Conservative
- Occupation: farmer, businessman, lumberman, politician

Arthur Culligan (July 29, 1878 – March 9, 1929) was a farmer, lumberman and political figure in New Brunswick, Canada. He represented Restigouche County in the Legislative Assembly of New Brunswick from 1912 to 1917 and Restigouche—Madawaska in the House of Commons of Canada from 1925 to 1926 as a Conservative member.

He was born in Culligan, New Brunswick. Culligan was defeated when he ran for re-election to the House of Commons in 1926.
