= Catacombe dei Cappuccini =

Catacombs in Palermo, Italy

Coordinates: 38.112°N 13.341°E

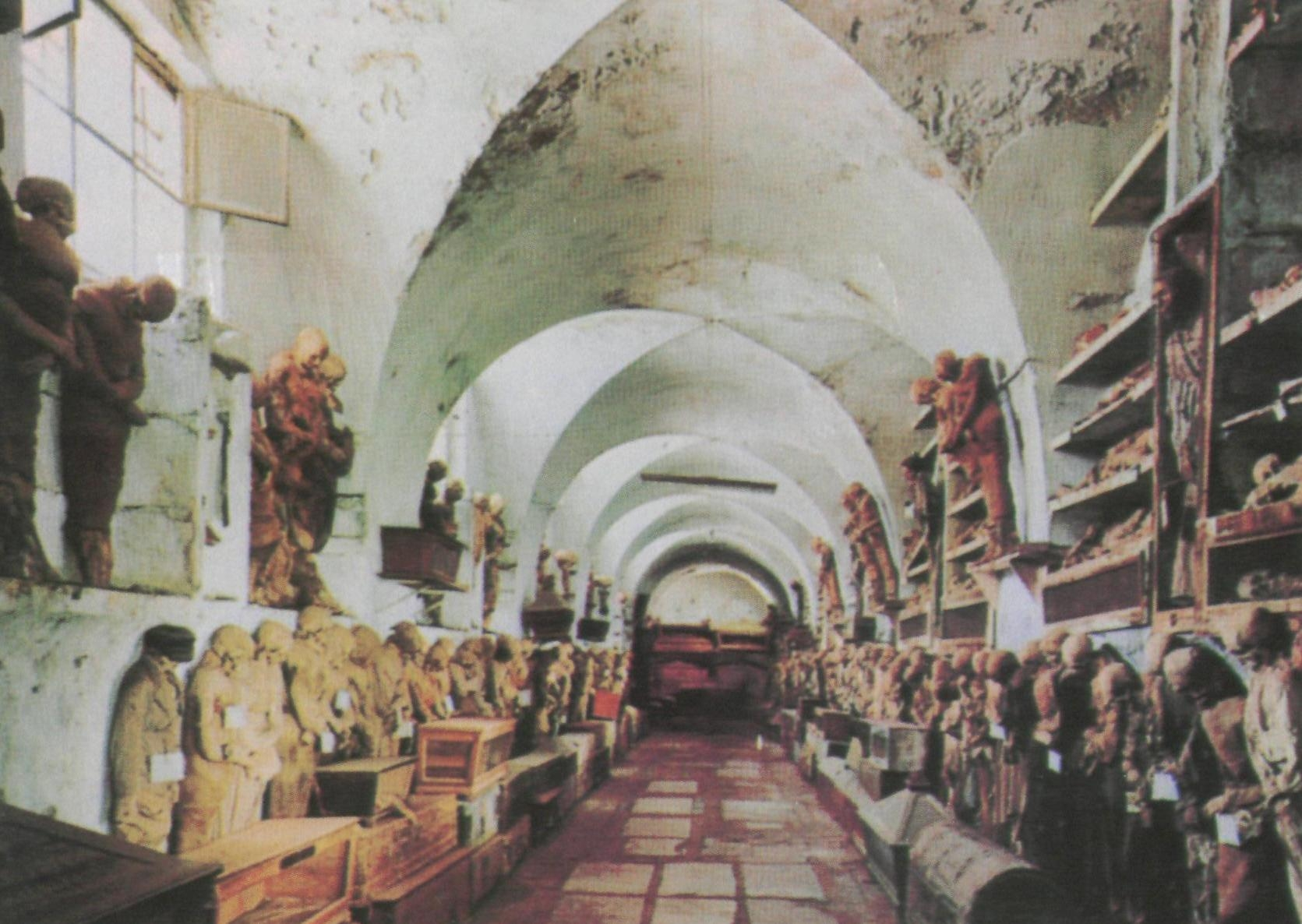
"Professionals' Corridor" in the Capuchin Catacombs

The Capuchin Catacombs of Palermo (also Catacombe dei Cappuccini or Catacombs of the Capuchins) are burial catacombs in Palermo, Sicily, southern Italy. Today they provide a somewhat macabre tourist attraction as well as an extraordinary historical record.

== Historical background ==
Palermo's Capuchin monastery outgrew its original cemetery in the 16th century and monks began to excavate crypts below it. In 1599 they mummified one of their number, the recently deceased brother Silvestro of Gubbio, and placed him in the catacombs.

Bodies were dehydrated on racks of ceramic pipes in the catacombs and sometimes later washed with vinegar. Some bodies were embalmed and others were enclosed in sealed glass cabinets. Friars were preserved with their everyday clothing and sometimes with ropes they had worn in penance.

Initially the catacombs were intended only for deceased friars. However, in later centuries it became a status symbol to be entombed in the Capuchin catacombs. In their wills, local luminaries would ask to be preserved in certain clothes, or even have their clothes changed at regular intervals. Priests wore their clerical vestments, while others were clothed according to contemporary fashion. Relatives would visit to pray for the deceased and to maintain the body in presentable condition.

The deceased were also arranged according to social categories, with separate sections for clergy, professionals, women and children, reinforcing the social distinctions visible in their clothing and manner of display.

The catacombs were maintained through donations from the relatives of the deceased. Each new body was placed in a temporary niche and later placed into a more permanent location. So long as contributions continued, the body remained in its proper place but if relatives stopped sending money, the body was put aside on a shelf until they resumed payments.

== Interments ==
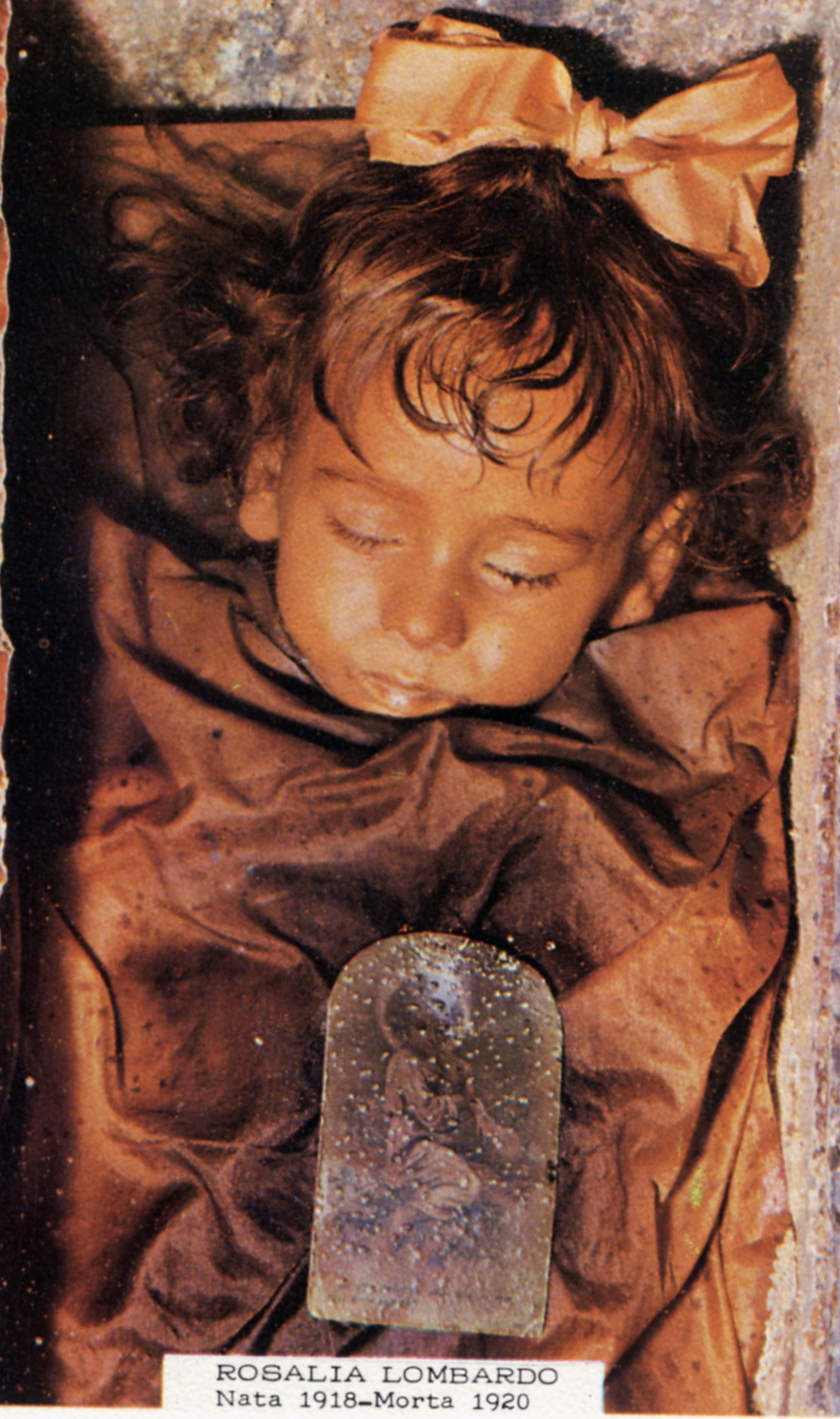
Rosalia Lombardo, who died in 1920, as she appeared in 1982

In 1871 Brother Riccardo was the last friar interred in the catacombs, but other famous people were interred after that. The catacombs were officially closed in 1880 but tourists continued to visit. The last burials are from the 1920s and 1930s. Among the final interments was Rosalia Lombardo, then nearly two years old, whose body remains remarkably intact, preserved with a procedure performed by Professor Alfredo Salafia. His process included formalin to kill bacteria, alcohol to dry the body, glycerin to keep it from over drying, salicylic acid to kill fungi, and the most important ingredients, zinc salts (zinc sulfate and zinc chloride) to give the body rigidity. The formula is one part glycerin, one part formalin saturated with both zinc salts, and one part of an alcohol solution saturated with salicylic acid. Further decomposition of Lombardo's body necessitated the mummy to be moved to a drier spot in the catacombs and the coffin placed inside a hermetically sealed glass enclosure with nitrogen gas to prevent decay. The final burial was that of Giovanni Licata di Baucina, the count of Isnello, in 1939.

The catacombs contain about 8,000 corpses and 1,252 mummies (as stated by last census made by EURAC in 2011) that line the walls. The halls are divided by category: men, women, virgins, children, priests, monks, and professionals. Some bodies are better preserved than others. Some are set in poses; for example, two children are sitting together in a rocking chair. The coffins were accessible to the families of the deceased so that on certain days the family, including the deceased, could join their hands in prayer.

Famous people buried in the catacombs include:

- Filippo d'Austria, formerly Ayala, prince of Tunis and convert to Catholicism (1620)
- Giuseppe Grimau, president of the kingdom (1755)
- Vincenzo Natoli, judge (1770)
- Lorenzo Marabitti, sculptor (early 19th c.)
- Filippo Pennino, sculptor (1801)
- Giuseppe Velasco, painter (1827)
- Salvatore Manzella, surgeon (1835)
- Alexandre Michaud de Beauretour, Piedmontese general and military advisor (1841, floor tomb)
- Giulio Ascanio Enea, colonel and war committee member (1848)
- Giovanni Corrao, partisan (1863)
- Paolo Ragona, colonel of artillery (1863)
- Bishop Agostino Franco (1877), titular Bishop of Hermopolis
- Marino Concettina, 5-year-old child, also known as the other Sleeping Beauty. (1880)
- Giovanni Paterniti, vice-consul of the United States (1911)
- Ernesto Salafia, fencing master (1914)
- Salvatore Auteri, opera composer (1924, tomb)

== Scientific research ==
A video of the inside of the catacombs

The Sicily Mummy Project was created in 2007 to study the mummies and to create profiles on those who were mummified. The project is led by anthropologist Dario Piombino-Mascali of the Department of Cultural Heritage and Sicilian Identity in Palermo, and is backed by the European Academy of Bozen/Bolzano The mummies are X-Rayed and CT scanned to collect information about them, along with other anthropological and paleopathological techniques to confirm their age and gender. Piombino-Mascali credits the program with re-opening discussion about death in Sicily;

For many years the subject of death was taboo [in Sicily]. Now, given the scientific importance of what's emerging with these mummies, people are understanding that in Sicily, death has always been part of life. And for centuries many Sicilians were using mummification to make sure there was a constant relationship between life and death.

— Dario Piombino-Mascali, January 2013, Archaeology News Network

Forensic biologist Mark Benecke identified several insects that shed light on the mummification process.

Recent scientific research has focused on the identities of the children in the Capuchin Catacombs.

== Tourism ==
The catacombs are open to the public. Photography inside is officially prohibited, which prominent signs make clear to visitors. However, some bodies have been shown on film in Francesco Rosi's Cadaveri Eccellenti ("Illustrious Corpses"), and television programmes such as the Channel 4 series Coach Trip, BBC TV series The Human Body in 1998, Francesco's Italy: Top to Toe, Ghosthunting With Paul O'Grady and Friends on ITV2 in 2008 and The Learning Channel in 2000. Iron grilles have been installed to prevent tourists tampering or posing with the corpses.

== Gallery ==
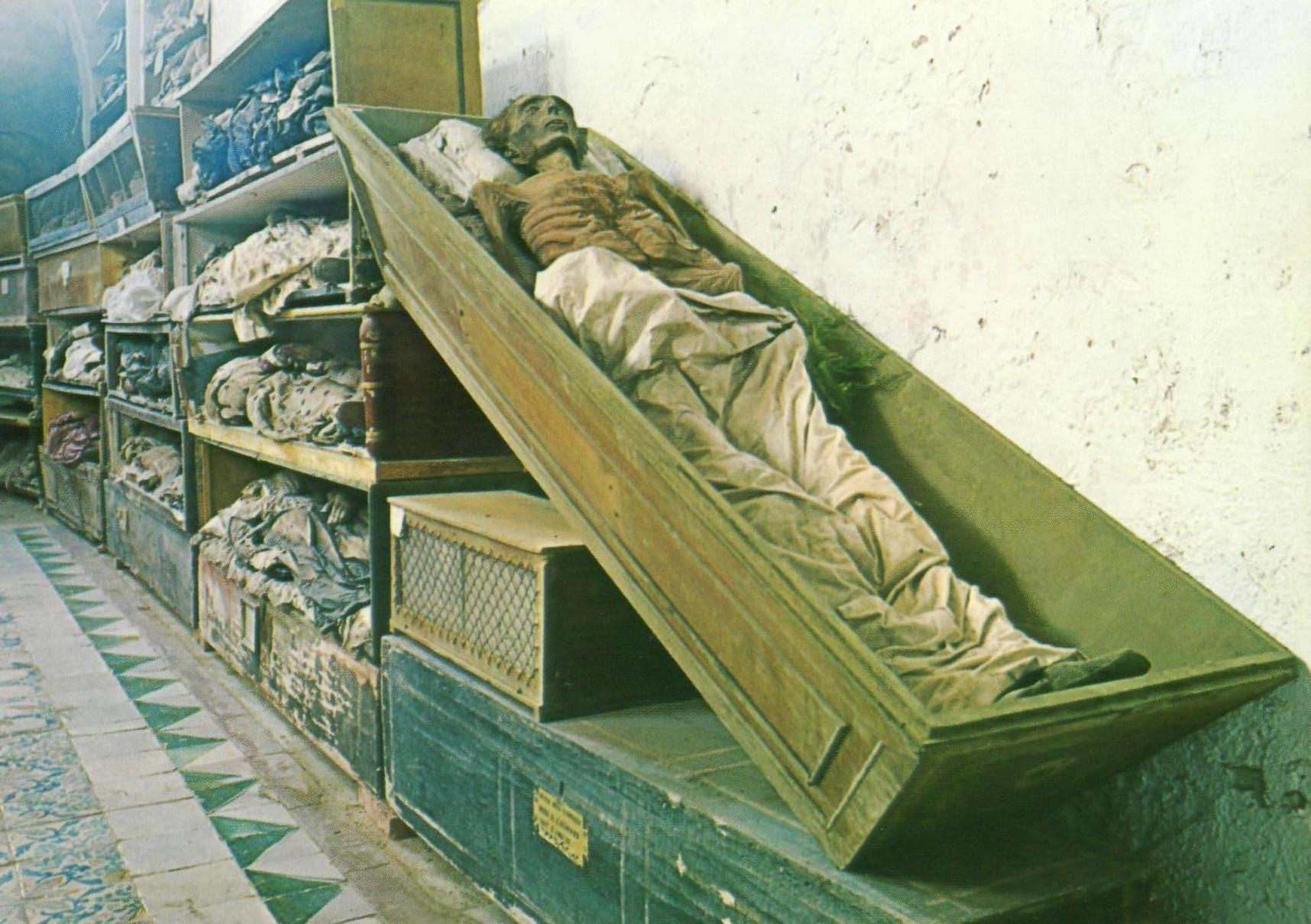
New Corridor

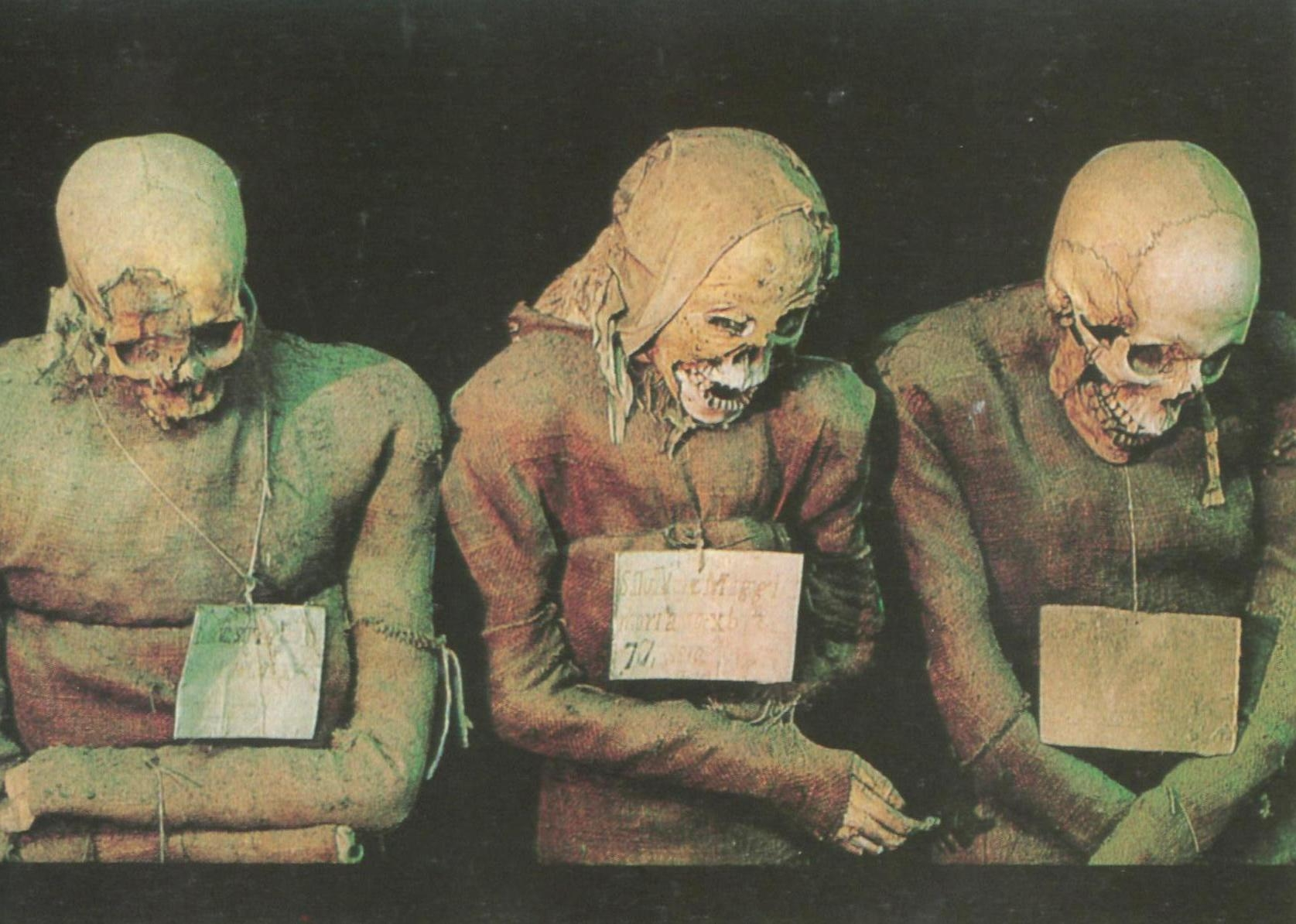
Monks' Corridor

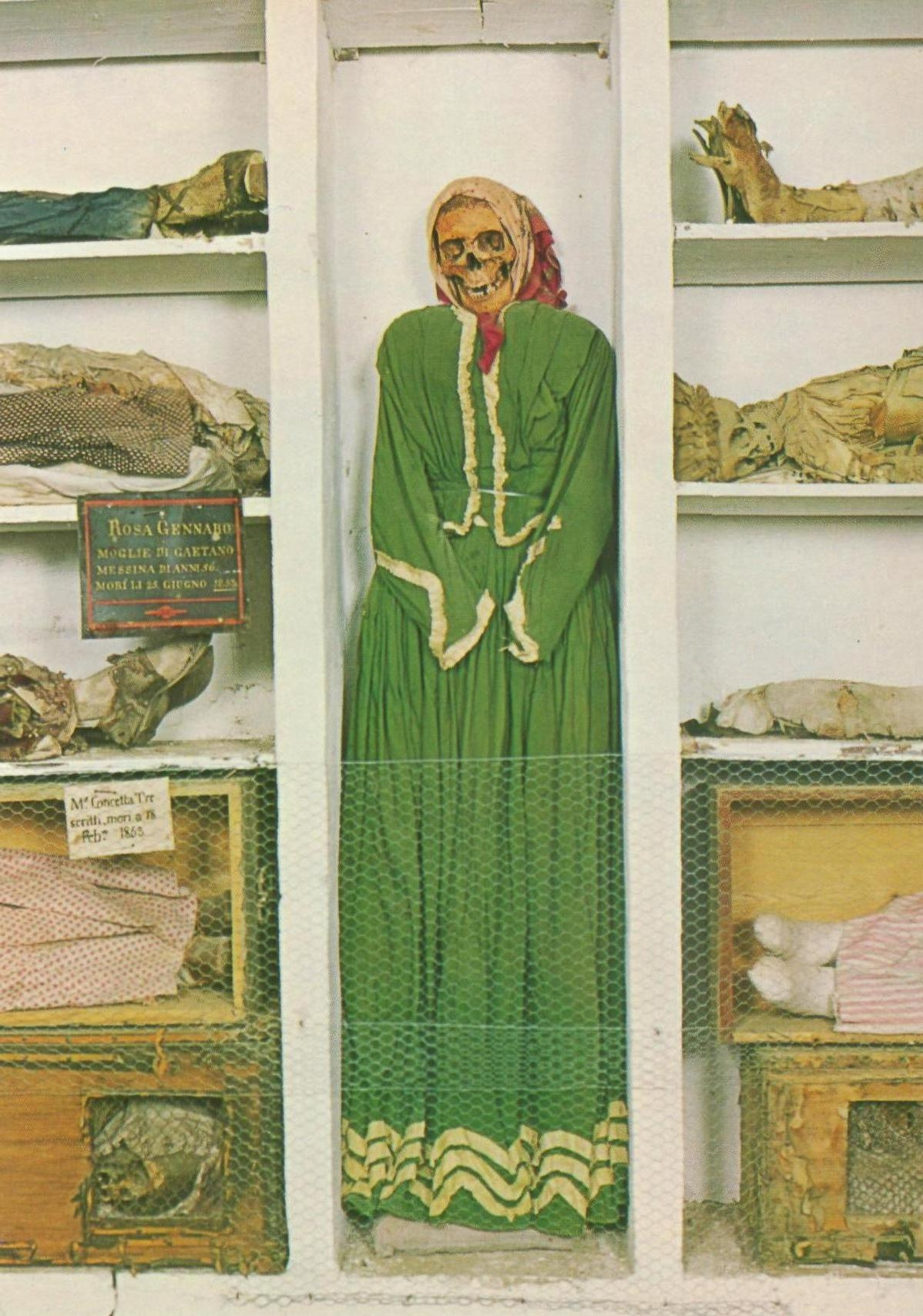
Women's Corridor

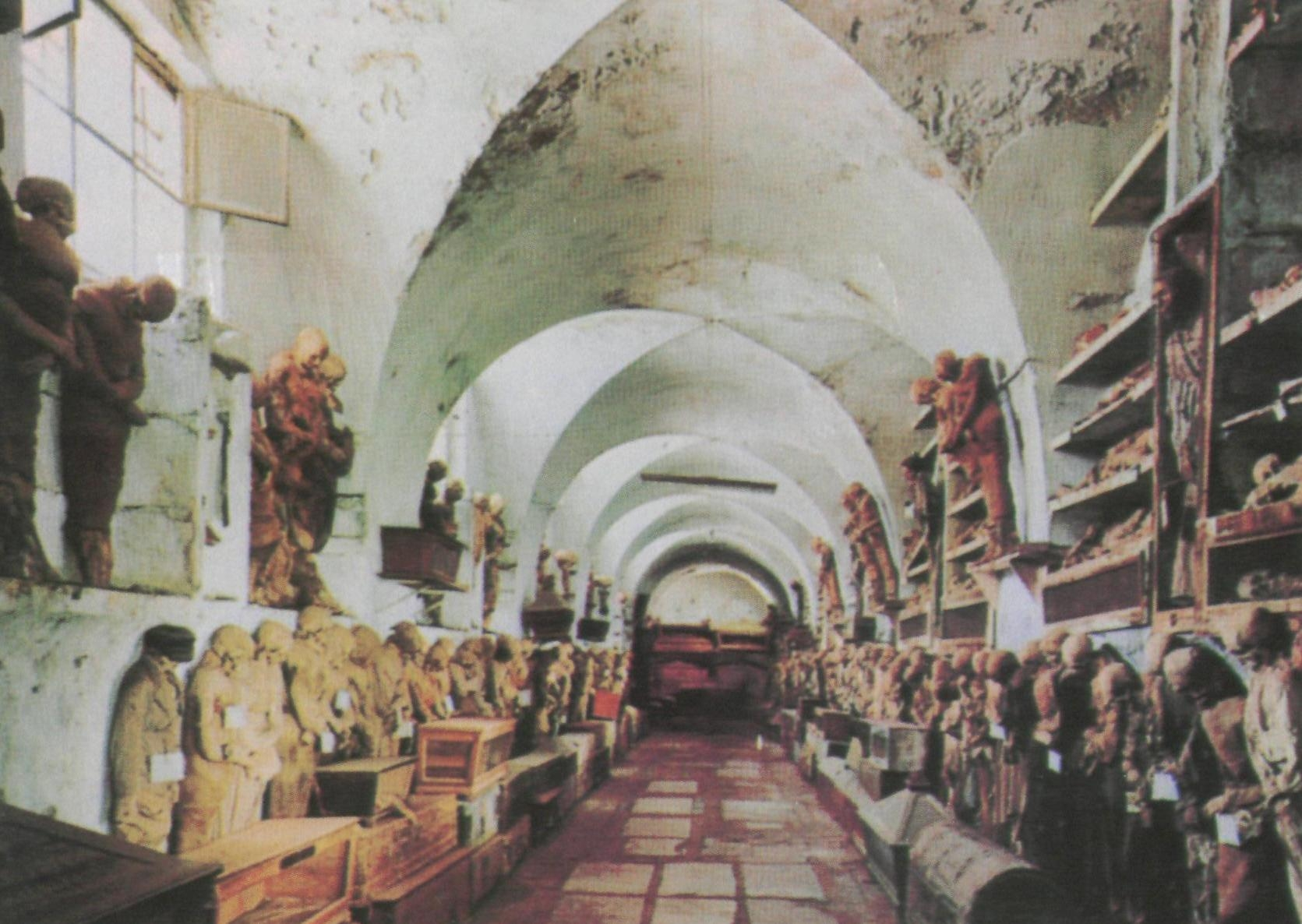
Professionals' Corridor

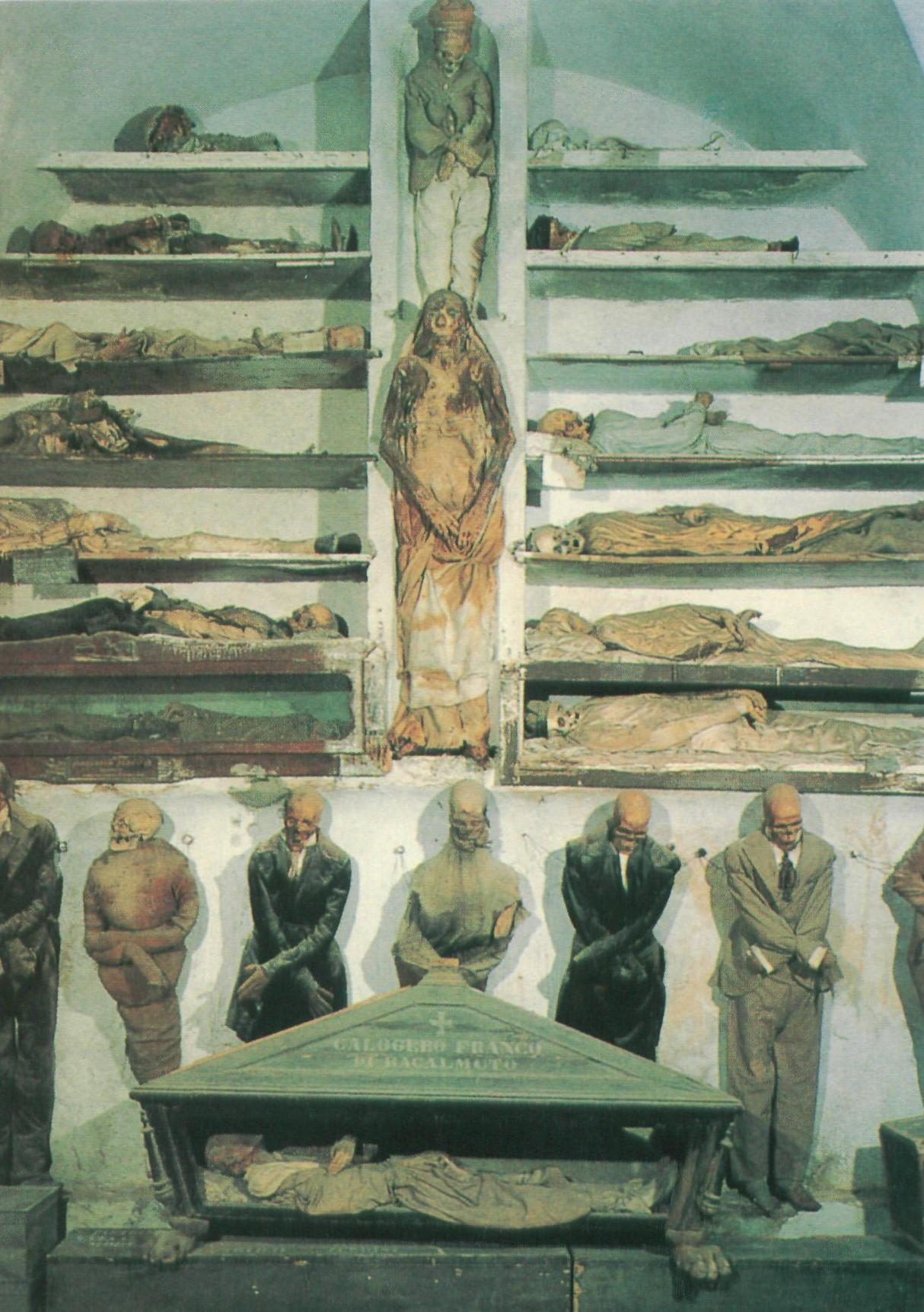
Men's Corridor

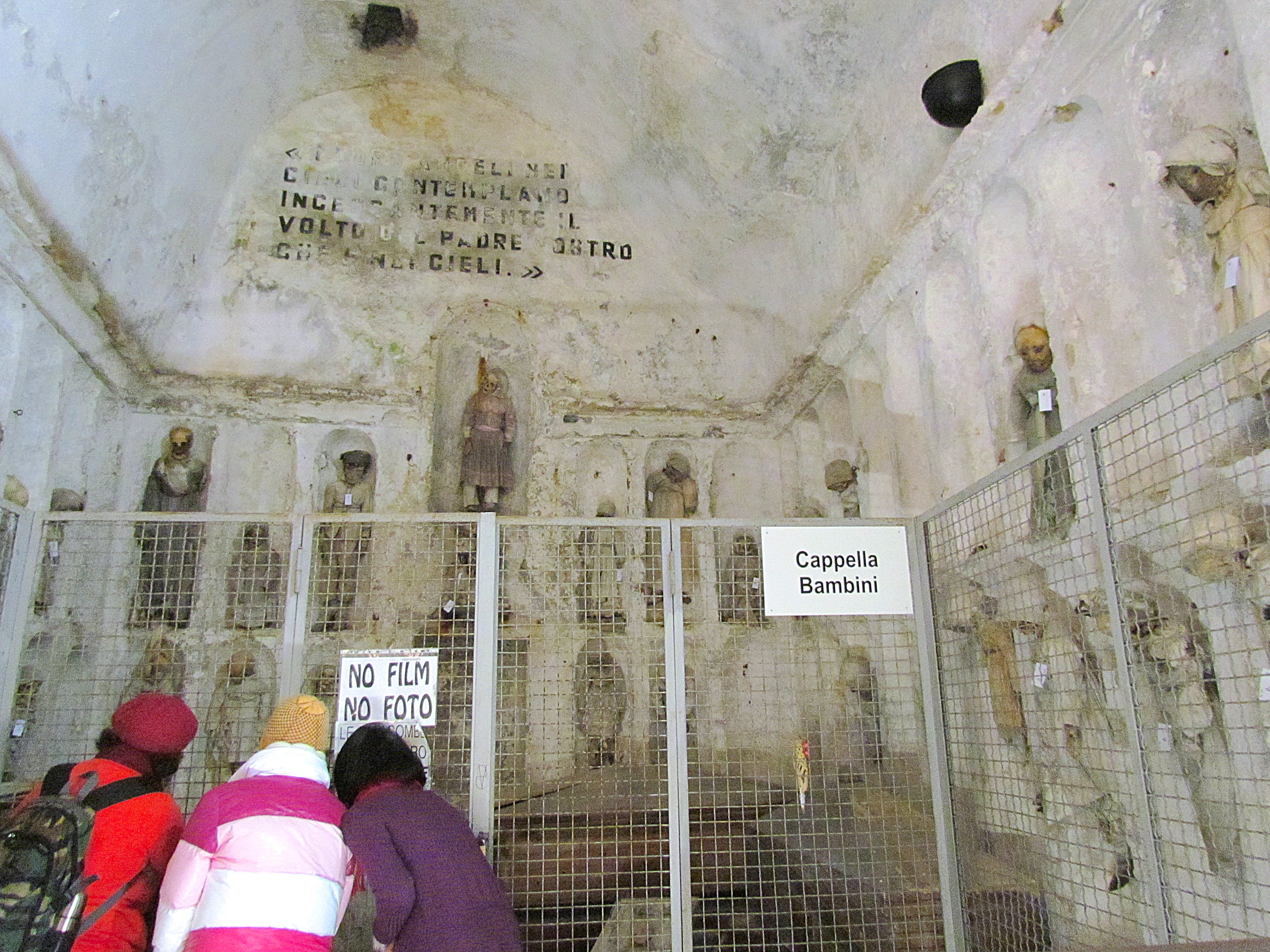
Children

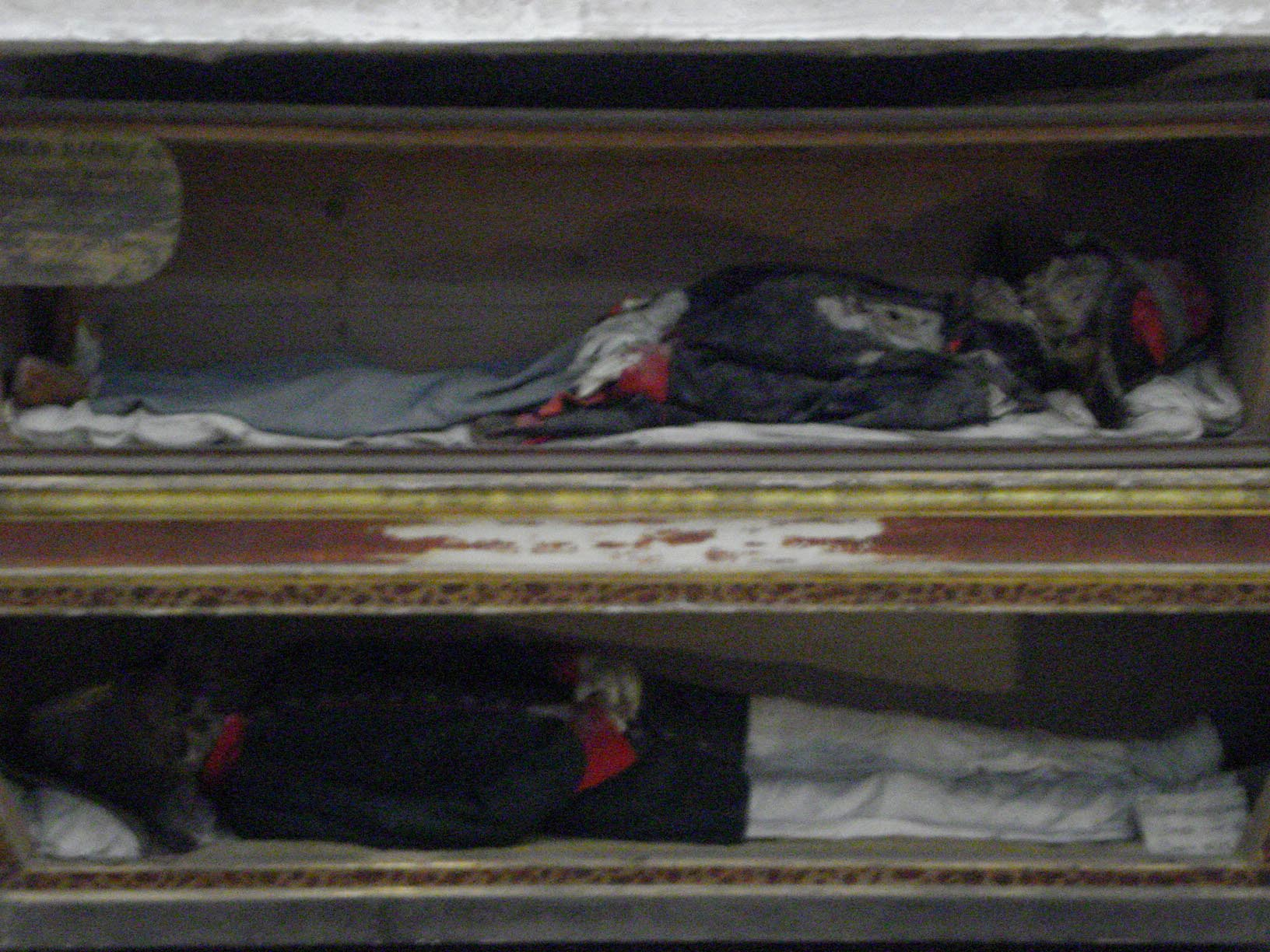
Cols. Giulio Enea (1848, bottom) and Paolo Ragona (1863, top)

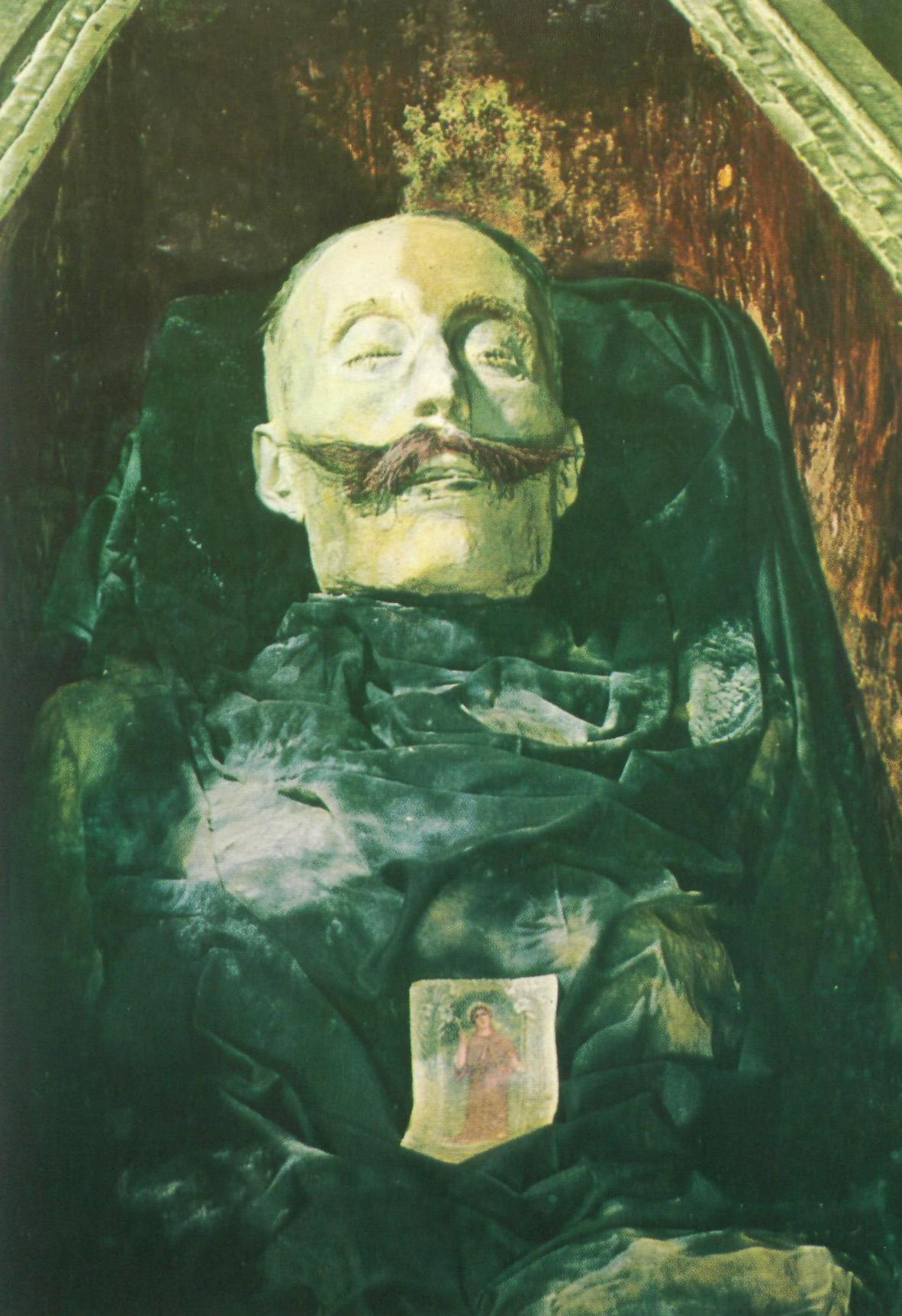
Giovanni Paterniti (1911)

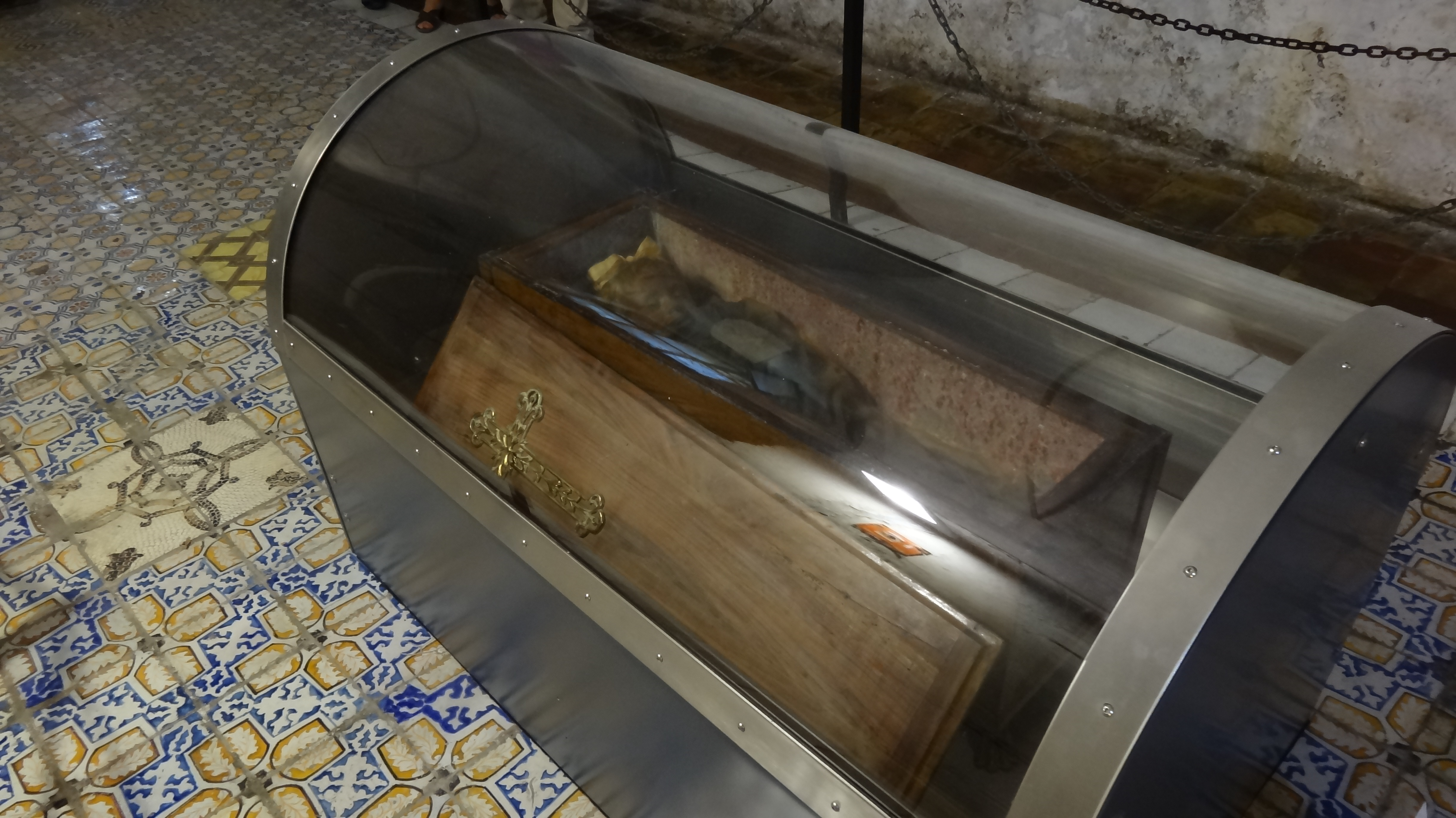
Rosalia Lombardo, as she appeared in 2012

== See also ==
- Capuchin Crypt, in Rome Italy
- Capela dos Ossos, in Évora, Portugal
