= Maxime Cormier =

Canadian politician

Member of the Canadian Parliament for Restigouche—Madawaska
- In office 8 September 1930 – 14 January 1933
- Preceded by: Stanislas Blanchard
- Succeeded by: Joseph Michaud

Personal details
- Born: 21 December 1878 Barachois, New Brunswick, Canada
- Died: 14 January 1933 (aged 54)
- Party: Conservative
- Profession: lawyer, teacher

Maximilien Dominic (Maxime) Cormier (21 December 1878 – 14 January 1933) was a Canadian politician. He was elected to the House of Commons of Canada in the 1930 election, representing the riding of Restigouche—Madawaska as a member of the Conservative Party.

He died in office in 1933.
