= Rosalia Lombardo =

Italian child whose mummy is preserved in Palermo (1918–1920)

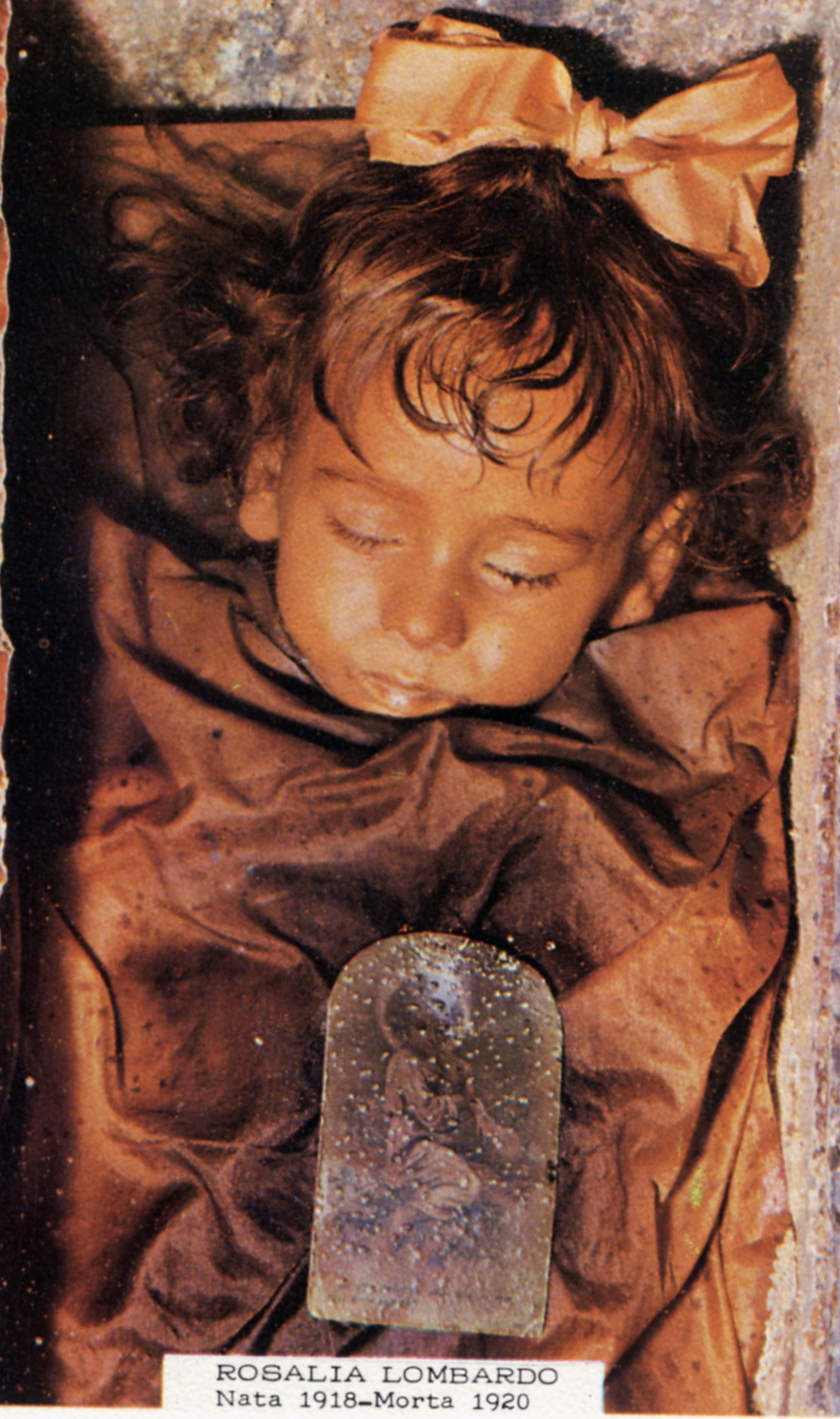
- Lombardo's embalmed body in the Capuchin catacombs of Palermo, 1982
- Born: 13 December 1918; Palermo, Sicily, Kingdom of Italy
- Died: 6 December 1920 (1 year, 359 days); Palermo, Sicily, Kingdom of Italy
- Other name: "Sleeping Beauty"
- Known for: Exceptionally well-preserved mummy in the Capuchin catacombs of Palermo

Rosalia Lombardo (13 December 1918 – 6 December 1920) was an Italian child whose exceptionally well-preserved embalmed body is displayed in the Capuchin catacombs of Palermo in Sicily. She died of bronchopneumonia, likely as a complication of the Spanish flu, one week before her 2nd birthday.

Following her death, her father, Mario Lombardo, commissioned the Palermo embalmer Alfredo Salafia to preserve her remains. Lombardo was one of the last people interred in the catacombs before burials there ceased. Her remarkable state of preservation has made her one of the best-known mummies in the catacombs and the subject of scientific study into early twentieth-century embalming techniques.

== Biography ==
Rosalia Lombardo, sometimes known as "Sleeping Beauty," was born in Palermo, Sicily, on 13 December 1918. Her parents were Mario Lombardo, a military officer, and Maria Di Cara. Little is known about her short life.

During the final years of the Spanish flu pandemic, Lombardo developed bronchopneumonia, believed to have been caused by complications of influenza. She died in Palermo on 6 December 1920, one week before her second birthday. Following her death, her father asked the Palermo embalmer Alfredo Salafia to preserve her body. Lombardo was then interred in the Capuchin catacombs of Palermo, where she was one of the last people admitted before burials there ceased.

== Embalming ==
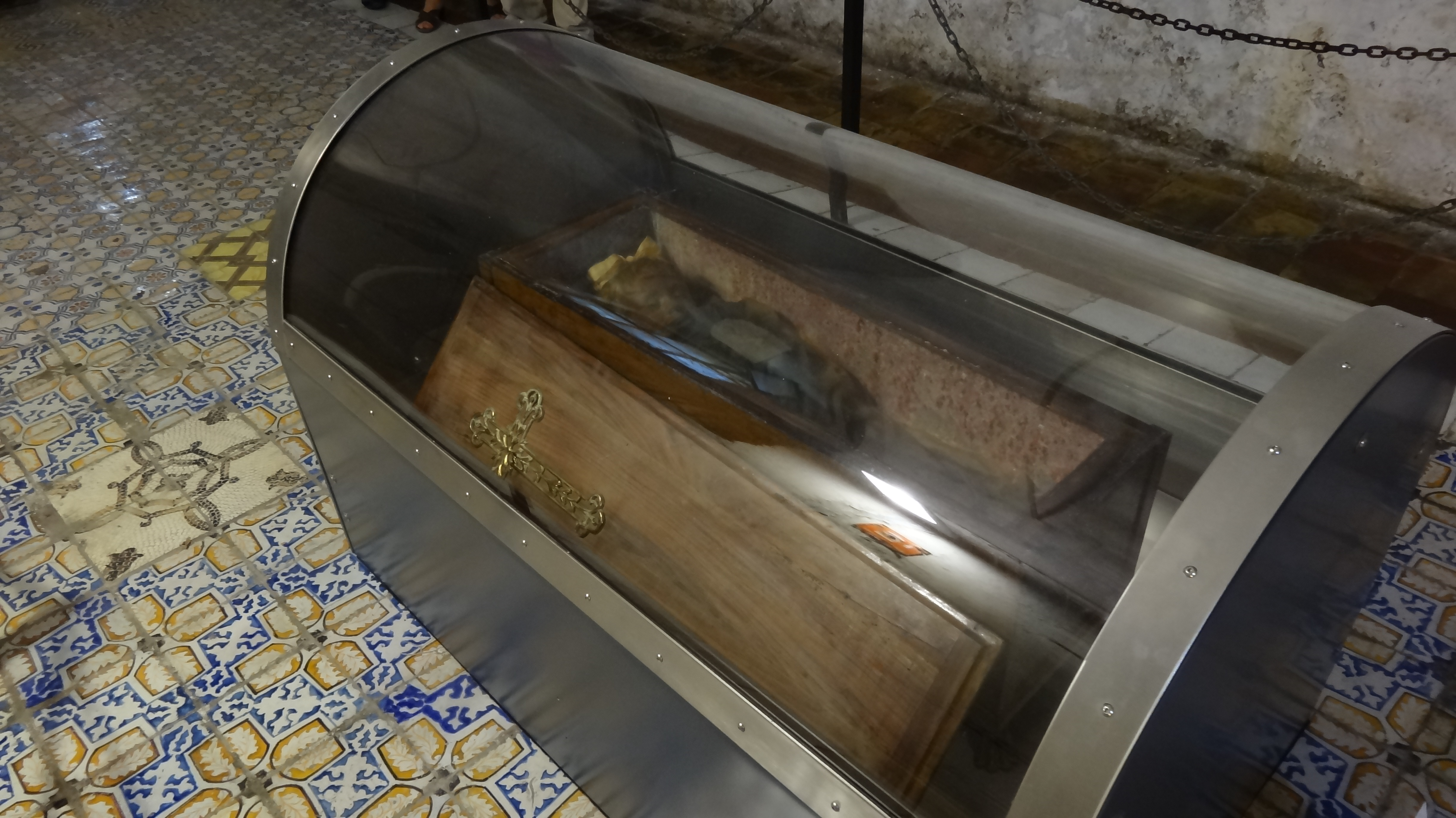
Lombardo's body in 2012.

Capuchin catacombs curator Dario Piombino-Mascali discovered a handwritten manuscript written by Salafia, wherein he lists the ingredients used to mummify Rosalia. The embalming formula is described as "one part glycerin, one part formalin saturated with zinc sulfate and zinc chloride, and one part of an alcohol solution saturated with salicylic acid", and was entered into the body through a single-point injection, most likely into the femoral artery via a gravity injector. Researcher Rossella Lorenzi reported that the formalin was used to kill bacteria, the glycerin used to prevent desiccation, and the salicylic acid used to eliminate any fungi within the flesh, with the purpose of the zinc salts being petrifaction. Thanks to Salafia's embalming techniques, the body was well-preserved. X-rays of the body show that all the organs are remarkably intact.

== Conservation ==
Lombardo's body is kept in a small chapel at the end of the catacomb's street and is encased in a glass covered coffin, placed on a wooden pedestal. A 2009 National Geographic photograph of Rosalia Lombardo shows the mummy is beginning to show signs of decomposition, most notably discoloration. Her body is starting to take on a yellow waxy skin texture. To address these issues, the mummy was moved to a drier spot in the catacombs, and her original coffin was placed in a hermetically sealed glass enclosure with nitrogen gas to prevent decay. The mummy remains one of the best preserved bodies in the catacombs.

== Public interest ==
The mummy has achieved further notoriety for a phenomenon in which her eyes appear to open and close several times a day, revealing her intact blue irises. In response to speculation about her moving eyelids, Piombino-Mascali stated that "It's an optical illusion produced by the light that filters through the side windows, which during the day is subject to change ... [her eyes] are not completely closed, and indeed they have never been".

== Sources ==
- Dario Piombino-Mascali, 2020. Lo spazio di un mattinoa di Rosalia Lombardo, la bambina che dorme da cento anni. Dario Flaccovio, Palermo.
