= CEDEP =

Nonprofit organization in Fontainebleau, France

CEDEP, also known as The European Centre for Executive Development (in French, Le Centre Européen d'Education Permanente), is an international, not-for-profit organization co-located on the INSEAD campus in Fontainebleau, France, about 50 km from Paris. Founded in 1972, it operates as an executive club and corporate university for a diverse set of 20 global companies including L’Oréal, Aviva, Renault, Bekaert, Valeo, AXA, GDF Suez, and TATA Steel. CEDEP offers two types of programs: Open Enrollment, available to managers from all member companies, and Company Specific programs. Most programs are delivered on CEDEP's purpose-built, residential campus, but in recent years CEDEP has been delivering programs off-campus, notably in China, Brazil, and Canada.

== History ==
CEDEP was created over 40 years ago by a group of European companies as an executive education club, and was among the first corporate-founded membership institutions in Europe dedicated to executive education. In its early days, CEDEP was essentially a sister organization to INSEAD, which at the time focused on MBA education. Faculty teaching at CEDEP in its early years were drawn almost exclusively from INSEAD's more experienced faculty, notably Henri-Claude de Bettignies, Robin M. Hogarth, Claude Rameau, and Lee Remmers.

The initial impetus was led by L'Oréal's head of Human Resources, Guy Landon, and François Dalle, its CEO. They were joined by Antoine Riboud and Jean-Leon Donnadieu (BSN, which later merged with Gervais-Danone), Renaud Gillet (Pricel and Rhone Progil, which would become part of the Rhone-Poulenc group), Antoine Bekaert (Bekaert), and René Dunant (Sandoz). The three main objectives for the founders were to: (1) expose managers to a mix of nationalities and industry contexts; (2) provide participants with a contrast between the theories and practice of management; and (3) create a force for change within their companies by establishing a critical mass of managers who had shared a key educational experience.

The CEDEP campus was opened in 1971 by the then French finance minister, Valery Giscard d'Estaing, who was to become France's president just three years later. Designed by a contemporary French architect, Bernard de la Tour d'Auvergne, who also helped design the original buildings on the INSEAD campus, the buildings combine brick and glass to reflect the colors of the surrounding Fontainebleau Forest. The buildings were extended in 2000 with additional wings that conserve the architectural style of the original buildings. The campus grounds also feature large sculptures by a number of celebrated European sculptors, including Francois-Xavier and Claude Lalanne, who designed the original campus, and Francesco Marino di Teana. The campus interior houses a notable collection of contemporary wall carpets by the likes of Sonia Delaunay (co-founder of the Orphism movement), Ivan da Silva-Bruhns and Natalia Dumitresco.

CEDEP's evolution was greatly influenced by two long-serving directors. In 1971 Salvatore Teresi, an INSEAD Marketing professor who was also one of CEDEP's founders, became its first director general. Over the following 20 years he oversaw an expansion in membership to 23 companies that resulted in more than 6,000 participants attending CEDEP's programs.

Claude Michaud, Teresi's Deputy Director (and also an INSEAD professor), took over in 1991 and led CEDEP for the next 16 years. Under his leadership CEDEP extended its membership to 20 members, including companies from outside Europe, most notably Tata Steel. It was also under Michaud's tenure that CEDEP started offering off-campus programs, in Hong Kong, Singapore, and India. Under the tenure of Michaud's successor, Han van Dissel, CEDEP extended its overseas activities, offering off-campus programs in China, Brazil, Canada and South Korea.

In 1979, an INSEAD decision-science professor, Robin M Hogarth, who also taught at CEDEP, undertook an in-depth study of CEDEP's General Management Program in order to assess whether executive education improved managerial decision-making. This project resulted in a book, Evaluating Management Education, published by John Wiley & Sons in 1979 ( ISBN 978-0471997399).

== Chronology ==
- 1969: Foundation of CEDEP by six European companies
- 1971: CEDEP building inaugurated and launch of the first General Management Program (GMP)
- 1971-79: A.P.Moller, Baring Brothers, Ericsson, Fiat, Renault, Midland Bank (later HSBC) and Electrabel (later GDF Suez) become members
- 1979: First Company Specific Programme (CSP) for L'Oréal
- 1988: Launch of Operational Management Program (OMP)
- 1991: First non-European member, Tata Steel
- 1996: First American member, BMS
- 2000: Extension of buildings and opening of new restaurant
- 2005: First off-campus programs delivered in India, for Aviva and Axa
- 2011: Launch of Mastering Business Excellence (MBE) program in Shanghai
- 2012: Launch of MBE in Brazil
- 2013: First Danone Lead Ahead Program in Seoul, South Korea.
- 2015: MBE in Montreal, Canada, in partnership with HEC Montreal

== Membership ==
CEDEP currently has 21 members, which have been with CEDEP for an average of 15 years (a third for over 25 years). Membership is not exclusive and there is no membership fee, simply a commitment to enroll a minimum number of participants on CEDEP programmes. Admission to the consortium requires approval by existing members.

== Management and oversight ==
CEDEP directly employs 26 people in program design, support, and member relationship roles. Leadership is provided by a director, who reports to the CEDEP Board, which is appointed by member companies. The current director is Thomas Hinterseer.

=== Past directors ===
- 1971-91: Salvatore Teresi
- 1991-2007: Claude Michaud
- 2007-11: Han van Dissel
- 2011-15: Jens Meyer
- 2015-16: Gerard Soyer
- 2016-: Thomas Hinterseer

== CEDEP Fellows Programme ==
Membership relations are largely maintained through CEDEP's Fellows Program. Each member is assigned a CEDEP Fellow, who is typically a regular CEDEP faculty participant. Fellows typically serve as program directors for their Company, work with the Dean of Programmes to develop courses, and assist the director general in recruiting new members.
