= Mount Costigan =

Mountain in Banff NP, Alberta, Canada

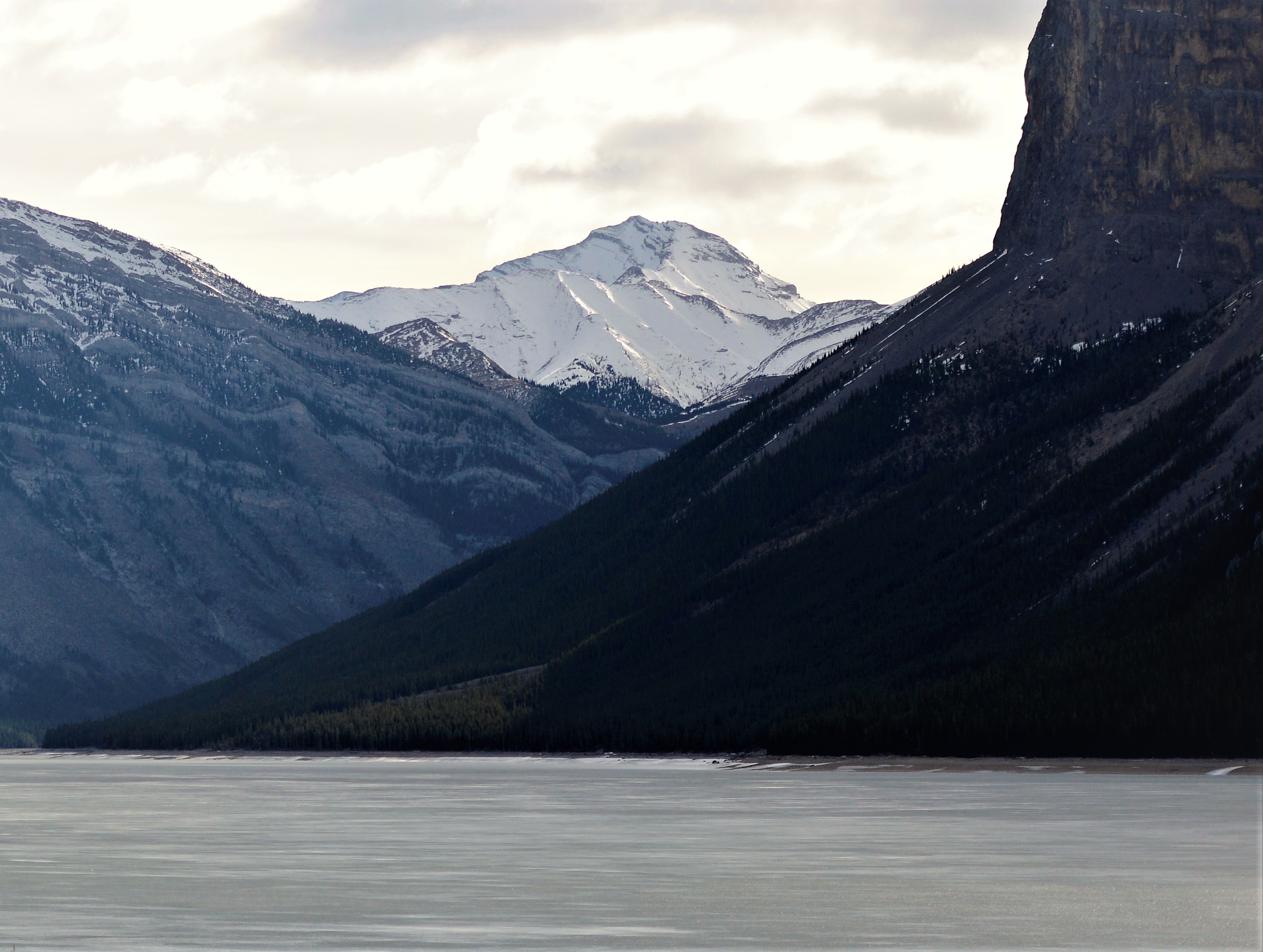
- Mount Costigan from Lake Minnewanka

Highest point
- Elevation: 2,973 m (9,754 ft)
- Prominence: 873 m (2,864 ft)
- Listing: Mountains of Alberta
- Coordinates: 51°17′08″N 115°16′55″W

Geography
- Location within Alberta Location within Canada
- Interactive map of Mount Costigan
- Location: Banff National Park; Alberta, Canada
- Parent range: Palliser Range; Canadian Rockies
- Topo map: NTS 82O6 Lake Minnewanka

Mount Costigan is a 2,973-metre (9,754-foot) summit in Alberta, Canada.

== Description ==
Mount Costigan is located north of the eastern end of Lake Minnewanka, on the boundary shared by Banff National Park with Ghost River Wilderness Area. Topographic relief is significant as the summit rises nearly 1,500 meters (4,920 feet) above the lake in 4 kilometers (2.5 miles). Mount Costigan was named in 1904 for John Costigan (1835–1916), a Canadian judge and politician who often visited this area. The peak's toponym was officially adopted November 2, 1956, by the Geographical Names Board of Canada.

== Geology ==
Mount Costigan is composed of sedimentary rock laid down during the Precambrian to Jurassic periods. Formed in shallow seas, this sedimentary rock was pushed east and over the top of younger rock during the Laramide orogeny.

== Climate ==
Based on the Köppen climate classification, Mount Costigan is located in a subarctic climate with cold, snowy winters, and mild summers. Winter temperatures can drop below −20 °C with wind chill factors below −30 °C. Precipitation runoff from this mountain drains into tributaries of the Ghost River.

== Gallery ==
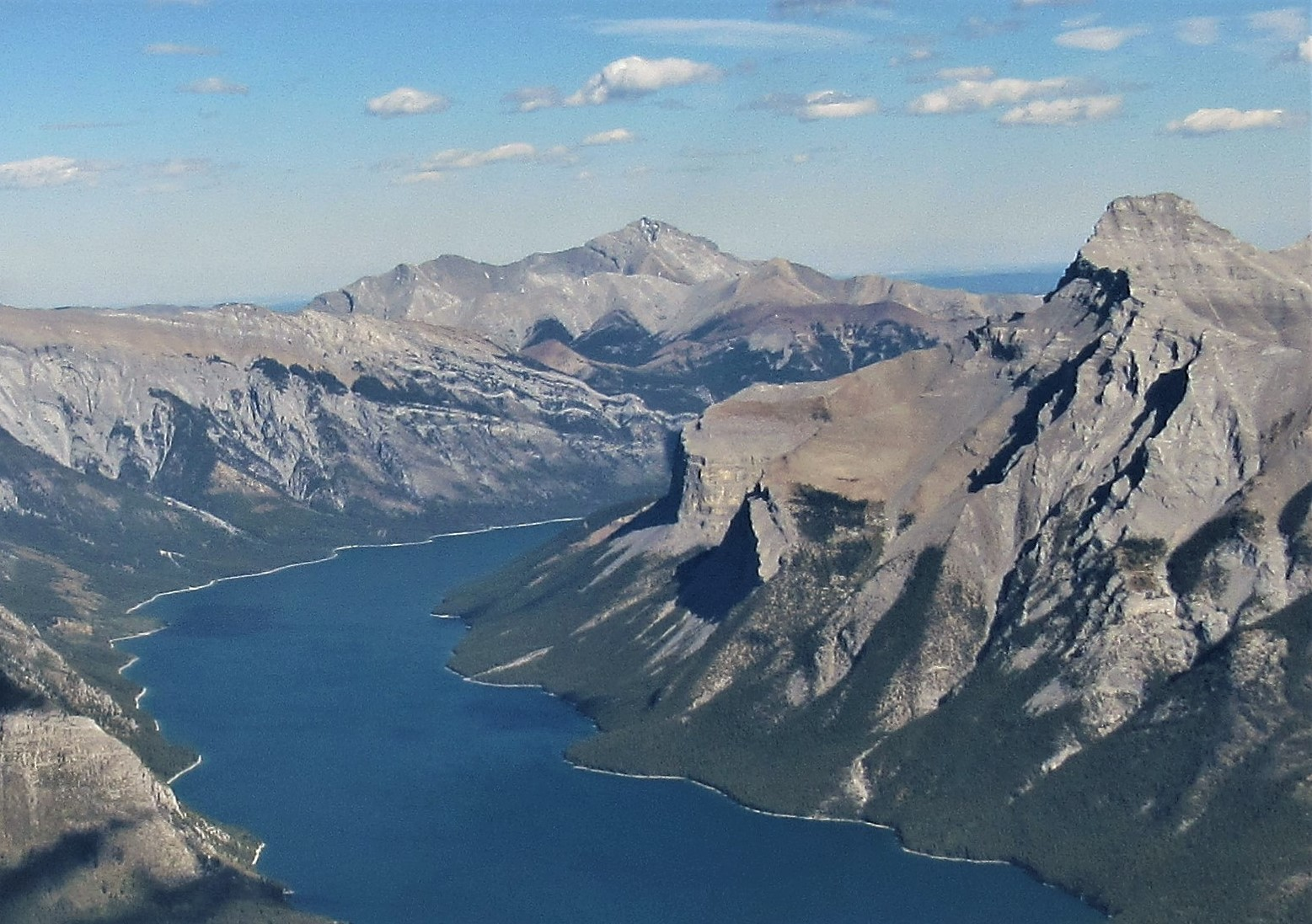
Lake Minnewanka with Mount Costigan centered in the distance.

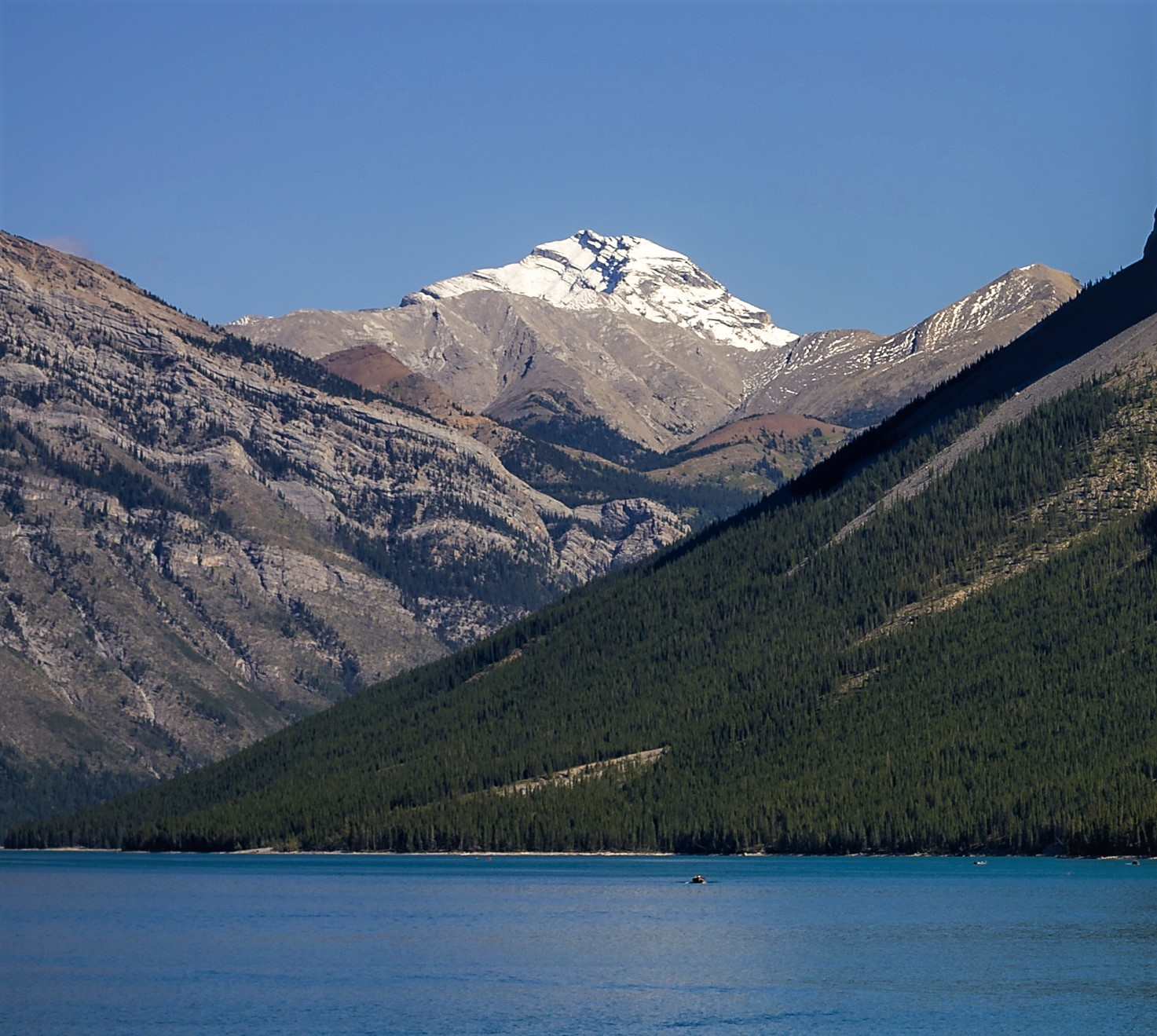

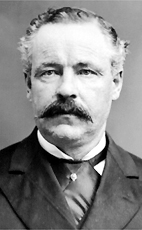
John Costigan

== See also ==
- Geography of Alberta
