= Giovanni Paterniti =

American diplomat

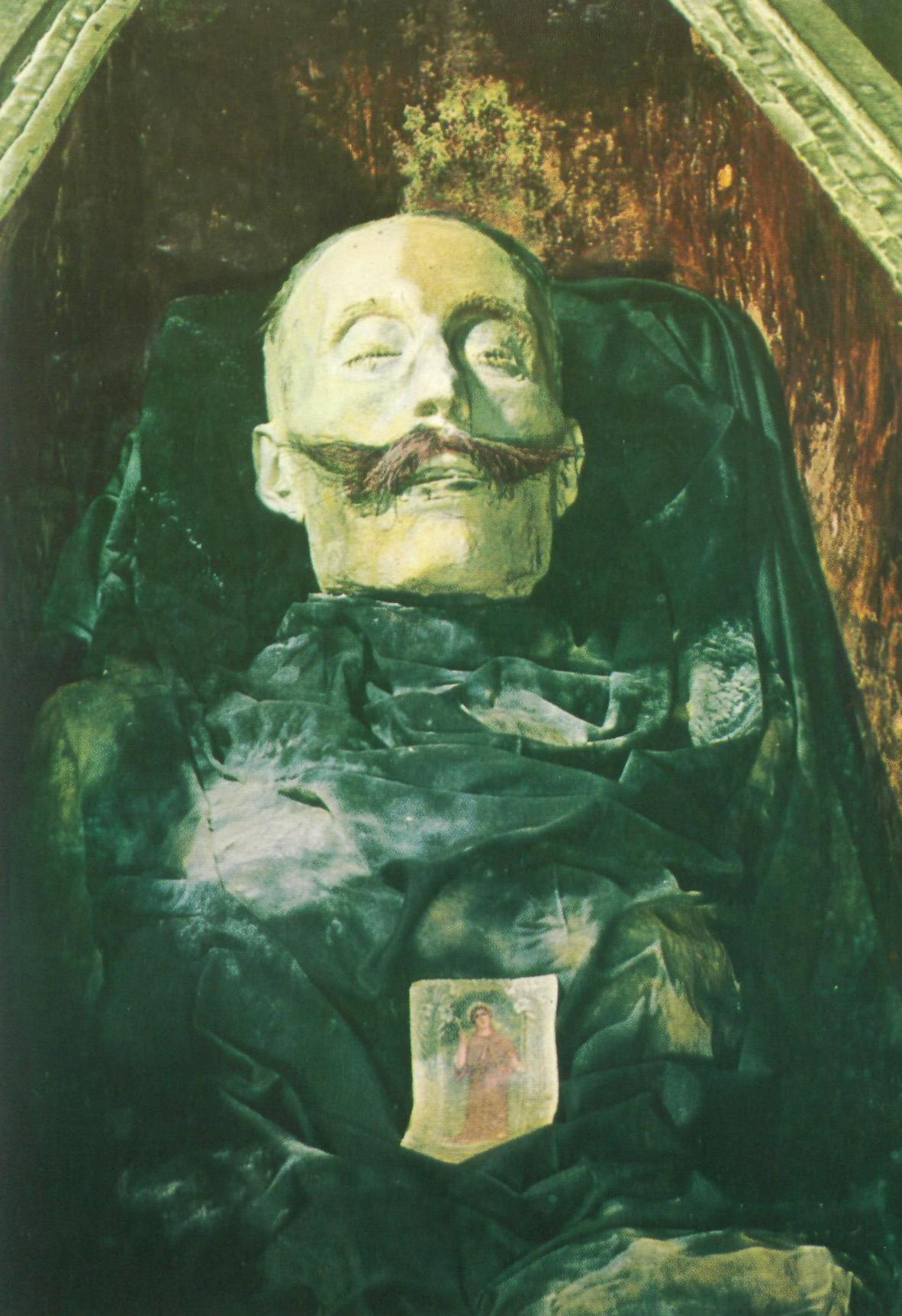
Paterniti's mummy in Capuchin Catacombs

Giovanni Paterniti was an American Vice Consul who died in Palermo, Italy in 1911. He is interred within the Capuchin Catacombs. He was prepared by the noted embalmer Alfredo Salafia.
