= Salvatore Auteri-Manzocchi =

Italian opera composer

- Born: 25 December 1845; Palermo, Italy
- Died: 21 February 1924 (aged 78); Parma, Italy
- Resting place: Catacombe dei Cappuccini
- Occupation: Opera composer
- Mother: Almerinda Manzocchi

Salvatore Auteri-Manzocchi (1845 in Palermo – 1924 in Parma) was an Italian opera composer. He was born in Palermo, Italy on 25 December 1845 and died in Parma, Italy on 21 February 1924. He was a student of Pietro Platania at Palermo and Mabellini at Florence. Once of his most successful works was the opera Graziella.

His body is interred in a neoclassical tomb in the Catacombe dei Cappuccini in Palermo.

== Early life ==
His mother, Almerinda Manzocchi

He was born the son of opera singer Almerinda Manzocchi on 25 December 1845. Growing up, he demonstrated an aptitude for music.

== Works ==
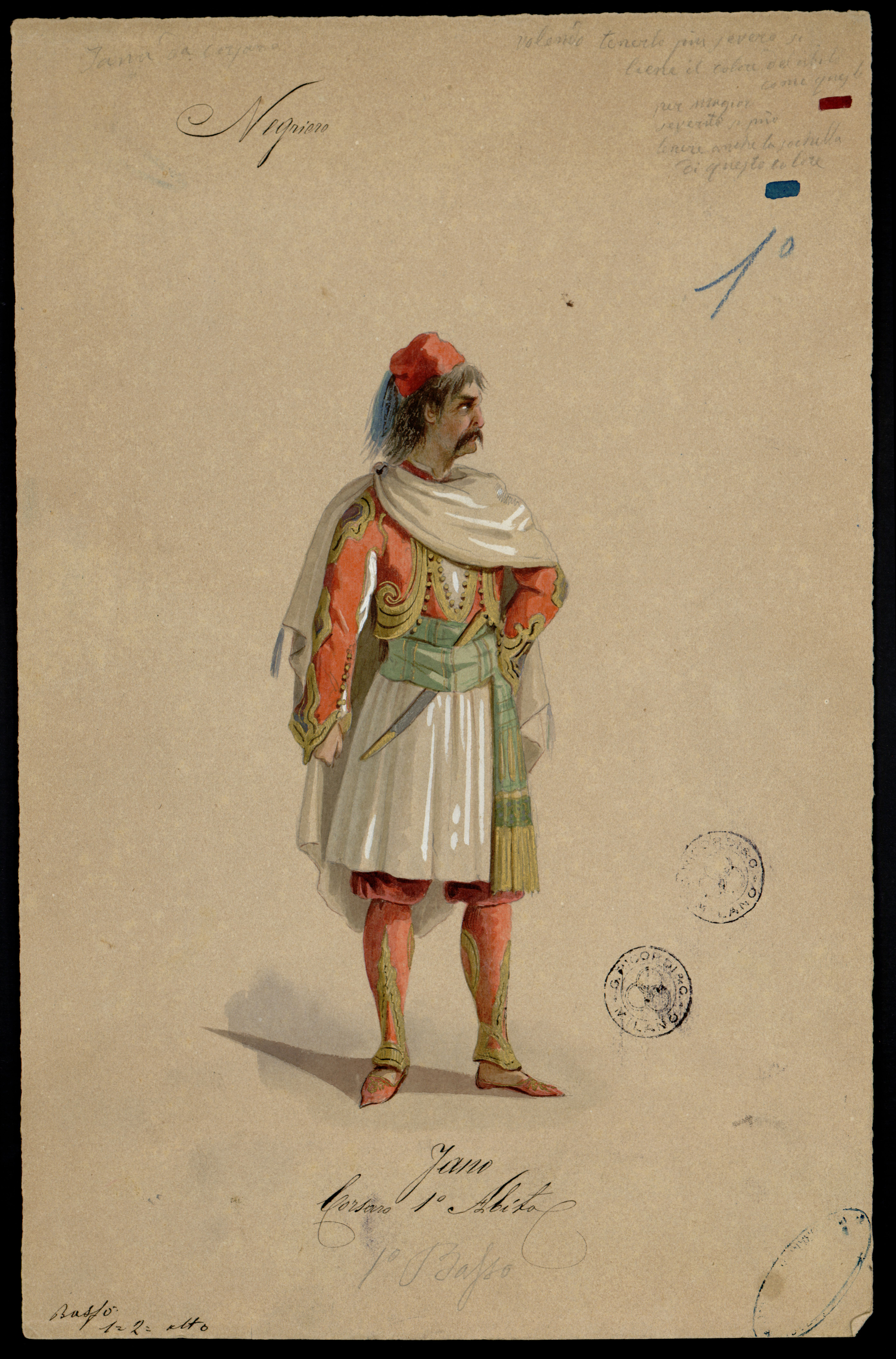
Jano, costume design for Il negriero act 1, 2 (1879).

=== Operas ===
- Dolores (1875)
- Il Negriero (1878)
- Stella (1880)
- Il Conte di Gleichen (1887)
- Graziella (1894)
- Severo Torelli (1903)
