= Benoît Michaud =

Canadian politician

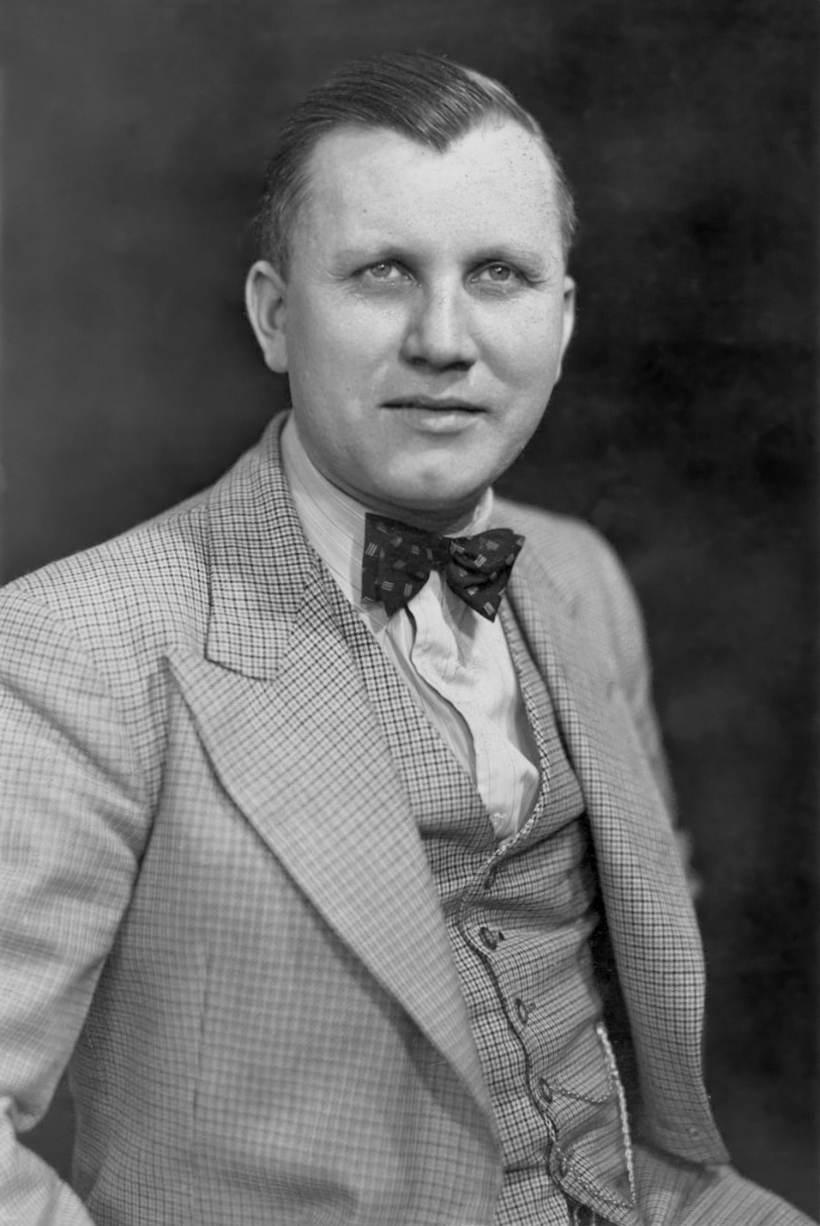

Member of Parliament for Restigouche—Madawaska
- In office June 11, 1945 – August 29, 1949
- Preceded by: Joseph-Enoil Michaud
- Succeeded by: Paul Dubé

Personal details
- Born: April 16, 1902 Grand Falls, New Brunswick, Canada
- Died: August 29, 1949 (aged 47)
- Party: Liberal
- Profession: Politician; judge; farmer

Benoît Michaud (April 16, 1902 – August 29, 1949) was a lawyer, notary, judge and political figure in New Brunswick. He represented Restigouche County in the Legislative Assembly of New Brunswick from 1944 to 1945 and Restigouche—Madawaska in the House of Commons of Canada from 1945 to 1949 as a Liberal member.

He was born in Grand Falls, New Brunswick. He died at the age of 47.
