= Michaux (surname) =

Michaux is a French surname. Notable people with the surname include:

- André Michaux (1746–1802), French botanist and explorer
- Bernard Michaux (1921–1987), Luxembourgian footballer
- François André Michaux (1770–1855), French botanist
- Henri Michaux (1899–1984), Belgian-French writer
- Lewis H. Michaux (1884/5–1976), African-American activist and bookseller
- Lightfoot Solomon Michaux (1883–1969), American entrepreneur and televangelist
- Mickey Michaux, American state legislator from North Carolina
- Pierre Michaux (1813–1883), French blacksmith, inventor of pedal bicycles

== See also ==
- Micheaux
