= Stanislas Blanchard =

Canadian politician

Member of the Canadian Parliament for Restigouche—Madawaska
- In office 1926–1930
- Preceded by: Arthur Culligan
- Succeeded by: Maxime Cormier

Personal details
- Born: 2 December 1871 Rustico, Prince Edward Island
- Died: 7 December 1949 (aged 78)
- Party: Liberal
- Occupation: gentleman

Stanislas Blanchard (2 December 1871 – 7 December 1949) was a Canadian politician and gentleman. He was elected to the House of Commons of Canada in the 1926 election to represent the Liberal Party in the riding of Restigouche—Madawaska. He did not run in the 1930 election.
