= Restigouche—Madawaska =

Former federal electoral district in New Brunswick, Canada

New Brunswick electoral district

Defunct federal electoral district
- Legislature: House of Commons
- District created: 1914
- District abolished: 1966
- First contested: 1917
- Last contested: 1965

Restigouche—Madawaska was a federal electoral district in New Brunswick, Canada, that was represented in the House of Commons of Canada from 1917 to 1968.

This riding was created in 1914 from parts of Restigouche and Victoria ridings.

With the 1966 redistribution, Madawaska County was moved to the new Madawaska—Victoria riding, while Restigouche County became the district of Restigouche.

== Members of Parliament ==
This riding elected the following members of Parliament:

Parliament	Years	Member	Party
Restigouche—Madawaska; Riding created from Restigouche and Victoria
13th	1917–1921	Pius Michaud	Opposition (Laurier Liberals)
14th	1921–1925	Pius Michaud	Liberal
15th	1925–1926	Arthur Culligan	Conservative
16th	1926–1930	Stanislas Blanchard	Liberal
17th	1930–1933	Maxime Cormier	Conservative
17th	1933–1935	Joseph-Enoil Michaud	Liberal
18th	1935–1940	Joseph-Enoil Michaud	Liberal
19th	1940–1945	Joseph-Enoil Michaud	Liberal
20th	1945–1949	Benoît Michaud	Liberal
21st	1949–1949	Benoît Michaud	Liberal
21st	1949–1953	Paul Dubé	Independent Liberal
22nd	1953–1955	Joseph Gaspard Boucher	Liberal
22nd	1955–1957	Charles Van Horne	Progressive Conservative
23rd	1957–1958	Charles Van Horne	Progressive Conservative
24th	1958–1961	Charles Van Horne	Progressive Conservative
24th	1961–1962	Edgar Fournier	Progressive Conservative
25th	1962–1963	Jean-Eudes Dubé	Liberal
26th	1963–1965	Jean-Eudes Dubé	Liberal
27th	1965–1967	Jean-Eudes Dubé	Liberal
Riding dissolved into Madawaska—Victoria and Restigouche

== Election results ==
1965 Canadian federal election
Party	Candidate	Votes	%	±%
Liberal	Jean-Eudes Dubé	15,211	55.4	+6.4
Progressive Conservative	Fernand Dubé	10,163	37.0	+18.3
Ralliement créditiste	Joseph-Hurgel Dubé	1,081	3.9	-28.2
New Democratic	Emelia Nugent	1,017	3.7	*

1963 Canadian federal election
Party	Candidate	Votes	%	±%
Liberal	Jean-Eudes Dubé	14,111	49.0	+3.3
Social Credit	Charles-Leopold Dubé	9,306	32.3	+26.2
Progressive Conservative	Louis Ayles	5,400	18.7	-25.2

1962 Canadian federal election
Party	Candidate	Votes	%	±%
Liberal	Jean-Eudes Dubé	13,525	45.7	-2.5
Progressive Conservative	Edgar Fournier	12,992	43.9	-7.9
Social Credit	André Boudreau	1,794	6.1	*
New Democratic	Aurèle Ferlatte	1,256	4.2	*

By-election on May 29, 1961
Party	Candidate	Votes
Progressive Conservative	Edgar Fournier	14,566	51.8	-4.3
Liberal	Jean-Eudes Dubé	13,544	48.2	+6.1

1958 Canadian federal election
Party	Candidate	Votes	%	±%
Progressive Conservative	Charles Van Horne	17,221	56.2	+1.5
Liberal	Ralph Azzie	12,909	42.1	-3.2
Social Credit	Joseph Senechal	538	1.8	*

1957 Canadian federal election
Party	Candidate	Votes	%	±%
Progressive Conservative	Charles Van Horne	15,774	54.7	+1.8
Liberal	Ralph Azzie	13,037	45.3	+1.2

By-election on September 26, 1955
Party	Candidate	Votes
Progressive Conservative	Charles Van Horne	12,942	52.9	+23.7
Liberal	John Bugold	10,770	44.1	-6.1
Independent Social Credit	Frederick Prickett	737	3.0	*

1953 Canadian federal election
Party	Candidate	Votes	%	±%
Liberal	Joseph Gaspard Boucher	13,266	50.2	-15.2
Progressive Conservative	Dillon Arseneault	7,724	29.2	+3.6
Independent Liberal	Paul Dubé	4,317	16.3	*
Co-operative Commonwealth	Oreian Richard Cole	1,126	4.3	*

By-election on October 24, 1949
Party	Candidate	Votes
Independent Liberal	Paul Dubé	15,919	58.5
Liberal	Albert Pichette	7,194	41.5

1949 Canadian federal election
Party	Candidate	Votes	%	±%
Liberal	Benoît Michaud	15,919	65.4	+10.2
Progressive Conservative	René Hudon	6,238	25.6	+2.1
Union des électeurs	Armand Grondin	2,172	8.9	*

1945 Canadian federal election
Party	Candidate	Votes	%	±%
Liberal	Benoît Michaud	12,200	55.2	-14.7
Progressive Conservative	Antoine McLaughlin	5,205	23.5	-6.6
Co-operative Commonwealth	Harry Marmen	2,412	10.9	*
Independent Liberal	Paul Dubé	2,300	10.4	*

1940 Canadian federal election
Party	Candidate	Votes	%	±%
Liberal	Joseph Michaud	12,164	69.9	-7.1
National Government	Oscar Levasseur	5,239	30.1	+7.1

1935 Canadian federal election
Party	Candidate	Votes	%	±%
Liberal	Joseph Michaud	13,562	77.0	+15.9
Conservative	Henry Diotte	4,045	23.0	-5.1

By-election on October 23, 1933
Party	Candidate	Votes
Liberal	Joseph Michaud	11,958	61.1	+12.5
Conservative	Paul Dubé	5,498	28.1	-23.3
Farmer-Labour	John Lewis Gordon Annett	2,117	10.8	*

1930 Canadian federal election
Party	Candidate	Votes	%	±%
Conservative	Maxime Cormier	10,037	51.4	+8.3
Liberal	Thomas McEvoy	9,489	48.6	-8.3

1926 Canadian federal election
Party	Candidate	Votes	%	±%
Liberal	Stanislas Blanchard	9,033	56.9	+13.4
Conservative	Arthur Culligan	6,850	43.1	-13.4

1925 Canadian federal election
Party	Candidate	Votes	%	±%
Conservative	Arthur Culligan	6,374	56.5	+38.0
Liberal	Pius Michaud	4,904	43.5	-38.0

1921 Canadian federal election
Party	Candidate	Votes	%	±%
Liberal	Pius Michaud	7,593	81.5	+12.4
Conservative	William Montgomery	1,723	18.5	-12.4

1917 Canadian federal election
Party	Candidate	Votes	%	±%
Opposition (Laurier Liberals)	Pius Michaud	5,077	69.1	
Government (Unionist)	David Stewart	2,271	30.9	

== See also ==
- List of Canadian electoral districts
- Historical federal electoral districts of Canada
