= Edgar Fournier =

Canadian politician (1908–1994)

Edgar E. Fournier (June 1, 1908 – April 29, 1994) was a teacher, principal and political figure in New Brunswick, Canada. He represented Madawaska County in the Legislative Assembly of New Brunswick from 1952 to 1960 and Restigouche—Madawaska in the House of Commons of Canada from 1961 to 1962 as a Progressive Conservative member. Fournier was named to the Senate of Canada for Madawaska-Restigouche division in 1962 and served until 1983.

He was born in Saint-Basile, New Brunswick, the son of Ernest Fournier and Anna Clovette. In 1932, Fournier married Martha Thibodeau. He served in the province's Executive Council as Chairman of the Electric Power Commission. Fournier was elected to the House of Commons in a 1961 by-election held after Charles Van Horne resigned his seat. He ran unsuccessfully for reelection in 1962 and was named to the Senate in September of the same year.

== Work in Senate ==
In 1968 Edgar Fournier was appointed Vice-Chair of the committee on poverty.

The Senate reported to the 28th session of Parliament in 1970. The 241 page Report of the Special Senate Committee on Poverty included the following statements:

"A new bill of rights for the poor must be preceded by a fundamental change in the prevailing public attitude towards those who live below the poverty level. … It is the Committee’s recommendation that the Parliament of Canada enact legislation to provide a guaranteed minimum income for all Canadians with insufficient income. This includes the elderly, the infirm, and the handicapped, female heads of families, the unemployed, those whose incomes are too low because they work in seasonal occupations, and those who are victims of jobs where the pay is insufficient to provide for their basic needs." …

"Sixty per cent of the poor are not on welfare. For them, there is not even the semblance of social justice. Consequently, there will be no good reason for their continued consent to a political, social, and economic system to which they give and from which they receive little." … The existence of poverty not only deprives the poor; it impoverishes the whole economy. The inadequate participation of the poor in the economy, it has been estimated, deprives it of somewhere between one and two and one-half billion dollars a year. This represents an output that these people could have contributed to the economy if their productive capacity had been better developed and more effectively used. Additionally, there are other costs that arise directly from the social problems caused by poverty. Large expenditures for health care, welfare services, and justice will be reduced as poverty diminishes. … The Committee believes that the Canadian people whose lives are spent in a far different world are ready to face the challenge of poverty. It is a national problem, and only the national government can find a realistic and meaningful solution. It is for the citizens of Canada to demand that this be our priority project for the 1970s; a project that will stir the world’s imagination and command its respect. We need search no further for a national purpose."
