= Alexandre Michaud de Beauretour =

Piedmontese military officer

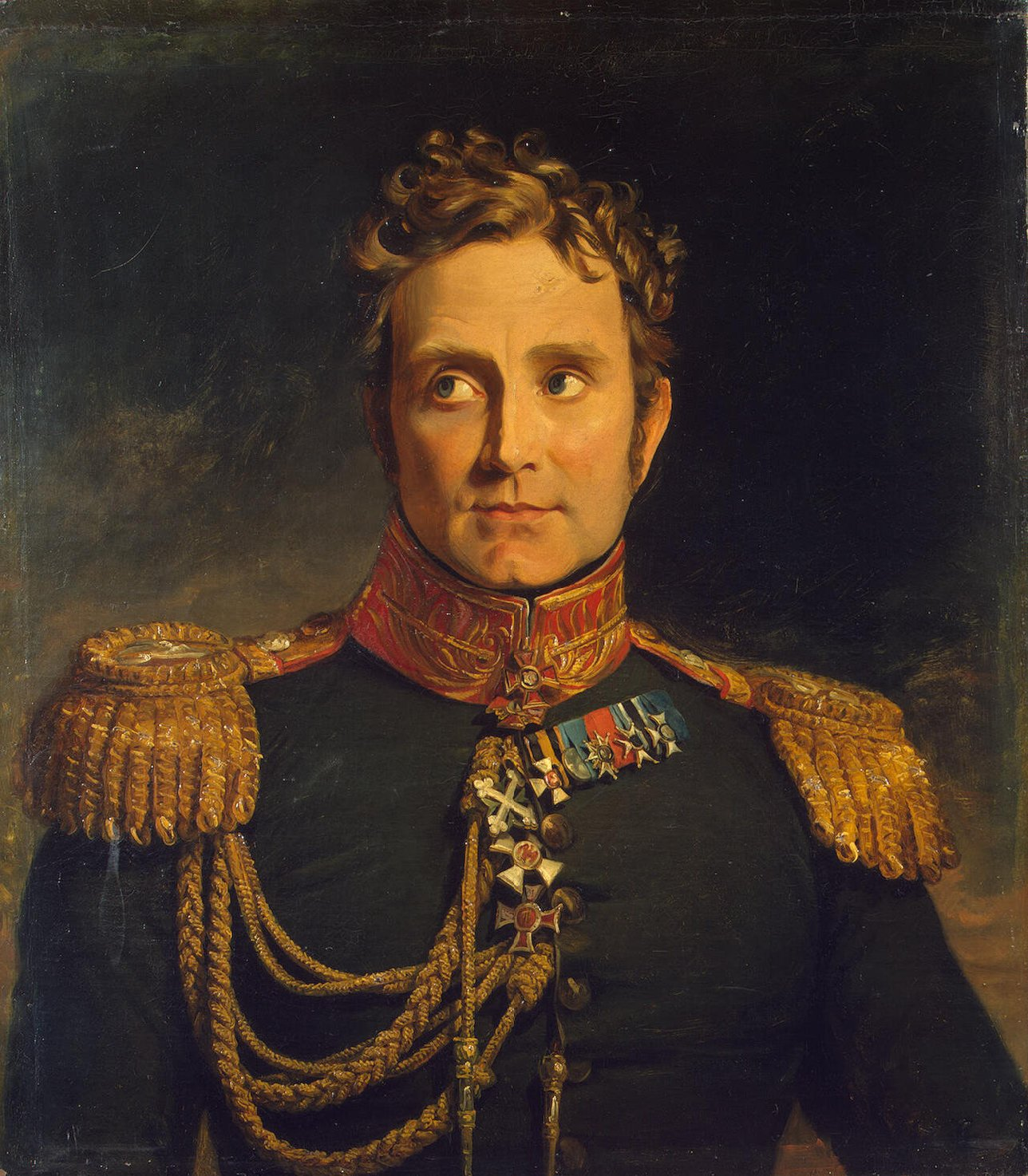

Alexandre Michaud, count of Beauretour (Russia: Александр Францевич Мишо; 19 January 1771, Nice, Kingdom of Sardinia – 22 July 1841, Palermo, Kingdom of the Two Sicilies) was a Piedmontese general who served in the Imperial Russian Army as aide de camp to the tsar and as a military commander. His father was Jean-François Michaud, chief engineer to the County of Nice. He is buried in a floor tomb in the Catacombe dei Cappuccini.
