= Paul Dubé =

Canadian politician

Member of Parliament for Restigouche—Madawaska
- In office October 1949 – August 1953

Personal details
- Born: Paul-Léon Dubé; 27 April 1892 Saint-Denis, Quebec, Canada
- Died: 6 June 1969 (aged 77) Edmundston, New Brunswick
- Party: Independent Liberal; Conservative (1867-1942)
- Spouse(s): Lumina Lavoie m. 25 September 1917
- Profession: locomotive engineer

Paul-Léon Dubé (27 April 1892 – 6 June 1969) was an Independent Liberal member of the House of Commons of Canada. He was born in St-Denis, Quebec and became a locomotive engineer by career and at one time a vice-president of the Canadian Association of Railway Employees.

He was first elected to Parliament at the Restigouche—Madawaska riding in a by-election on 24 October 1949 after two previous unsuccessful campaigns there as a Conservative candidate in an October 1933 by-election and as an Independent Liberal in the 1945 federal election. After serving until the end of his term in the 21st Canadian Parliament, Dubé was defeated in the 1953 election by Joseph Gaspard Boucher of the Liberal party.

He died after years of declining health on 6 June 1969.
