= Henri-Claude de Bettignies =

French professor of business

Henri-Claude de Bettignies is a French professor of business. He holds the EU Chair for Global Governance and Sino-European Business Relations at the China Europe International Business School (CEIBS), is director of the Europe China Center for Leadership and Responsibility. He is AVIVA Chair Professor of Leadership and Responsibility at INSEAD, specialized in Asian business, leadership, business ethics and corporate social responsibility. He is one of the longest-serving faculty at the INSEAD MBA Programme, where he coordinates several executive education programs.

== Education and early career ==
De Bettignies was educated at Sorbonne, Catholic University of Paris, and at Harvard Business School. He has worked in Africa, at the University of California, in New York (for IBM), and Tokyo. In 1967 as assistant professor, he initiated the development of the organisational behaviour department. In 1970, he was involved in the creation (1971) of the European Centre for Continuing Education (CEDEP). He was given a professorship in 1975, and started and developed INSEAD's activities in Japan and the Asia Pacific region, leading to the creation of the Euro-Asia Centre (1980), of which he was director general (1980–1988). He then accepted a joint appointment at Stanford University's graduate school of business from 1988 to 2004.

== Current activities ==
He is currently developing the Ethics initiative at INSEAD, and leads the AVIRA program for business leaders, which brings together chairmen and CEOs from about 30 countries for leadership training. He teaches the MBA courses on Ethics and Global Business, and Culture and Management in Asia at Stanford and INSEAD.

De Bettignies spends part of his time in the Asia Pacific region, directing and teaching two executive programmes: Human Resource Management in Asia, and Managing Change & Change of Management in Asia.

He is the Founder and director of the Centre for the Study of Development and Responsibility (CEDRE). He is a consultant to several major organisations in Europe, US and Asia Pacific region.

== Publications ==
De Bettignies books include:

- The Management of Change (1975)
- Business Transformation in China (1996), ISBN 978-0415123228
- The Changing Business Environment in the Asia Pacific Region (1997), ISBN 978-0415123204
- Trade and Investment in the Asia Pacific Region (1997), ISBN 978-0415123211

He is also co-author of:

- Le Japon (1998), ISBN 978-2080355706
- Business Ethics: Policies and Persons (McGraw-Hill, 2005), ISBN 978-0072996906
- Business, Globalization and the Common Good (2009), ISBN 978-3039118762
- Finance for a Better World: The Shift Toward Sustainability: The Shift Towards Sustainability (2009), ISBN 978-0230551305

He has published more than 50 articles in business and professional journals. He is on the editorial board of the Journal of Asian Business, International Studies of Management & Organization, The Asian Academy of Management Journal, The New Academic Review, Corporate Governance: the International Journal of Business and Society, Thunderbird International Business Review, Finance and Common Good. He is on the international advisory board of the International Association for Chinese Management Research (IACMR), Asian Business and Management, VIGEO; and a member of the Board of Jones Lang LaSalle.
