= Han van Dissel =

Han Gert van Dissel (born 27 January 1956, Amsterdam) was the dean of the Faculty of Economics and Business at the University of Amsterdam from 2011 to 2022, where he is a professor of business administration. He was previously the Director-General of CEDEP (The European Center for Executive Development) and Dean of the Rotterdam School of Management. His research and teaching focuses on the study of organization and information processes.

== Career ==
Professor van Dissel received his PhD from the Erasmus School of Economics and joined the faculty of Erasmus University in 1985 as an assistant professor and was subsequently promoted to associate professor and full professor of information management. He was Dean of the Rotterdam School of Management from 2002 to 2007 and Director-General of CEDEP from 2007 to 2011. He has held visiting faculty positions at SDA Bocconi School of Management, the University of the Netherlands Antilles (now the University of Curaçao), and the Hunan College of Finance and Economics.

== Other Affiliations ==
Han van Dissel has served as chairman of the supervisory board of the World Museum in Rotterdam and as a board member of the Community of European Management Schools. He is currently a member of the international supervisory board of the ESC Rennes School of Business.
