= Alfredo Salafia =

Italian embalmer (1869–1933)

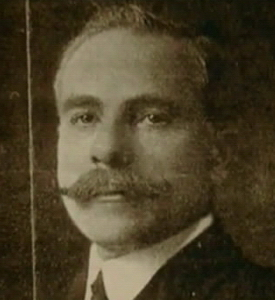
- Salafia in c. 1910
- Born: November 7, 1869; Palermo, Italy
- Died: January 31, 1933 (aged 63); Palermo
- Occupations: Embalmer and taxidermist

Alfredo Salafia (November 7, 1869 – January 31, 1933) was a Sicilian embalmer and taxidermist of the 1900s.

In December 1920, he embalmed a little girl, Rosalia Lombardo, in Palermo, Sicily at her father's request. She currently lies in a glass topped, sealed coffin in Palermo's Capuchin friary catacombs (Catacombe dei Cappuccini), and is available for public viewing as one of the best preserved bodies there. The formula Salafia used to embalm her, found in his handwritten memoirs, involved injecting the body with a solution of formalin, zinc salts, alcohol, salicylic acid, and glycerin.

== Technique ==
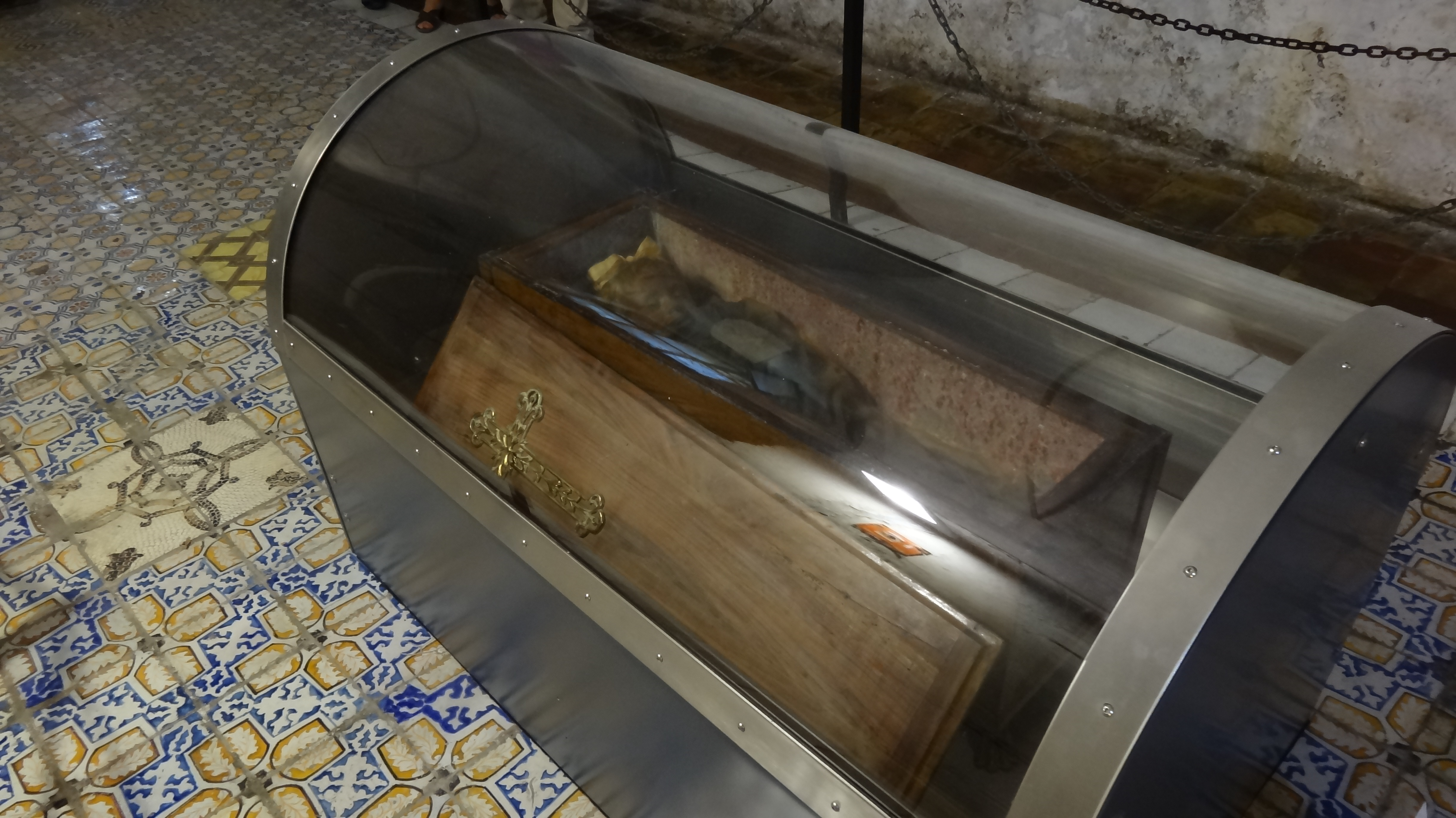
Rosalia Lombardo's body as it appears today.

The mummification techniques used by Salafia were discovered in 2007 in his handwritten memoir. He injected the cadaver with a fluid made of formalin to kill bacteria, alcohol to dry the body, glycerin to keep her from overdrying, salicylic acid to kill fungi, and zinc salts to give her body rigidity. Accordingly, the formula's composition is "one part glycerin, one part formalin saturated with both zinc sulfate and chloride, and one part of an alcohol solution saturated with salicylic acid."
