= Micheaux =

Micheaux is a French surname. Notable people with the name include:

- Dante Micheaux (living), American poet
- Larry Micheaux (born 1960), American basketball player
- Nicki Micheaux (born c. 1971), American actress
- Oscar Micheaux (1884–1951), American author and film director and producer

== See also ==
- Michaux (disambiguation)
