= Pius Michaud =

Canadian politician

Member of Parliament for Victoria
- In office 1907–1917
- Preceded by: John Costigan
- Succeeded by: riding dissolved

Member of Parliament for Restigouche—Madawaska
- In office 1917–1925
- Preceded by: first member
- Succeeded by: Arthur Culligan

Personal details
- Born: August 28, 1870 St. Leonard, New Brunswick, Canada
- Died: July 5, 1956 (aged 85)
- Party: Liberal
- Occupation: Lawyer

Pius Michaud (August 28, 1870 – July 5, 1956) was a Canadian lawyer and politician who served in the House of Commons of Canada. He represented the electoral district of Victoria from 1907 to 1917, and Restigouche—Madawaska from 1917 to 1925, as a member of the Liberal Party.

He was the son of Felix Michaud and Marguerite H. Violette and was educated at St. Joseph's College. In 1899, he married Marie Hebert. Michaud served as secretary-treasurer for the council for Madawaska County. He lived in Edmundston.

He won the riding of Victoria by acclamation in 1907, following the appointment of John Costigan to the Senate, and was reelected in the 1908 and 1911 elections. He was subsequently re-elected in the redistributed riding of Restigouche—Madawaska in the 1917 and 1921 elections, but was defeated by Arthur Culligan of the Conservatives in the 1925 election.

By-election on 15 January 1907 Due to John Costigan's call to the Senate
Party	Candidate	Votes
Liberal	Pius Michaud	acclaimed

1908 Canadian federal election: Victoria, New Brunswick
Party	Candidate	Votes
Liberal	Pius Michaud	2,611
Conservative	Clarence A. Kirkpatrick	728

1911 Canadian federal election: Victoria, New Brunswick
Party	Candidate	Votes
Liberal	Pius Michaud	3,059
Conservative	Maximilien Dominic Cormier	1,111
