= Frederick LaForest =

Former Canadian politician

Member of the Legislative Assembly of New Brunswick
- In office 1899–1903 Serving with Narcisse A. Gagnon, Thomas Clair
- Constituency: Madawaska

Personal details
- Born: June 6, 1864 Fredericton, New Brunswick
- Died: April 27, 1908 (aged 43) Edmundston, New Brunswick
- Party: Independent
- Spouse: Olive Moreau (m. 1892)
- Occupation: Lawyer

Frederick LaForest (June 6, 1864 – April 27, 1908) was a Canadian politician. He served in the Legislative Assembly of New Brunswick as a member from Madawaska County.
