= Claude Michaud =

French economist (1936–2014)

Claude Michaud (1936-2015) was a management educator and economist. He was a professor of economics at INSEAD and a director-general of the European Center for Executive Development.

== Career ==
After obtaining a PhD in economics at the University of Bordeaux, Claude Michaud joined (in 1961) the Banque Sudameris, then a subsidiary of the Banca Commerciale Italiana. He moved a year later to the Caisse Nationale des Marchés d'État, an agency of the French Ministry of Finance. In 1967 he joined the Centre de Recherche de l'Urbanisme, a research center set up by the French Ministries of Education and Construction in the 1960s, becoming its Research Director in 1975. In 1970 he joined the economics faculty of INSEAD as an associate professor, becoming a full professor five years later. Also in 1975 he accepted the post of Deputy Director of CEDEP, becoming Director General in 1991 and served in that capacity until his retirement in 2003. He came out of retirement to serve a second term as Director General in 2005 and retired definitively in 2007. He was also Scientific Adviser to the Fondation Europe et Société (1985–94) and Member of the Science Council of the Tissot Economic Foundation (1988–95).

== Work ==
His research initially focused on urban development. He then turned to issues of regulation, privatization, and competitiveness. With the increasing integration of Europe's national economies in the EEC and later the EU he began looking at the implications of the single European market. His work in the 1990s looked more at the drivers of firm competitiveness and resulted in the publications with Chicago decision-scientist Robin Hogarth and sociologist Jean-Claude Thoenig.

== Honors ==
Claude Michaud was appointed a Chevalier de l'Ordre Nationale du Mérite in 2010

== Selected publications ==
- Making Strategy and Organization Compatible, Claude Michaud and Jean-Claude Thoenig, Palgrave Macmillan 2003
- Stratégie et sociologie de l'entreprise, Claude Michaud and Jean-Claude Thoenig, Village Mondial 2001
