= Joseph-Enoil Michaud =

Canadian politician

The Honourable Joseph-Enoil Michaud PC
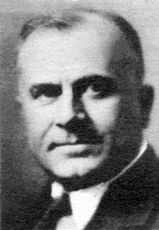

Member of the Canadian Parliament for Restigouche—Madawaska
- In office 1933–1945
- Preceded by: Maxime Cormier
- Succeeded by: Benoît Michaud

Personal details
- Born: September 26, 1888 Saint-Antonin, Quebec
- Died: May 23, 1967 (aged 78)
- Party: Liberal
- Profession: Barrister, notary

Joseph-Enoil Michaud PC (September 26, 1888 – May 23, 1967) was a Canadian politician.

Born in Saint-Antonin, Quebec, Michaud represented Madawaska County in the Legislative Assembly of New Brunswick from 1917 to 1933 as a Liberal. He served as a minister without portfolio in the province's Executive Council from 1920 to 1921 and 1923 to 1925. Michaud was also mayor of Edmundston from 1919 to 1920 and from 1932 to 1936.

He was first elected to the House of Commons of Canada representing the New Brunswick riding of Restigouche—Madawaska in a 1933 by-election. A Liberal, he was re-elected in 1935 and 1940. He held the following ministerial positions in the cabinet of Mackenzie King: Minister of Fisheries, Minister of Justice and Attorney General of Canada (Acting), Minister of Public Works (Acting), and Minister of Transport.
