= François Dalle =

French businessman (1918–2005)

- Born: 18 March 1918; Hesdin (France)
- Died: 9 August 2005 (aged 87); Genève (Suisse)
- Occupation: Chief executive officer
- Years active: 1957–1984
- Predecessor: Eugène Schueller
- Successor: Charles Zviak
- Parents: Joseph Dalle (father); Jeanne Dumont (mother)

François Dalle (French pronunciation: [fʁɑ̃swa dal]), born on 18 March 1918 in Hesdin (Pas-de-Calais, France) and died on 9 August 2005 in Geneva, Switzerland, was a French company director and business executive. He transformed L’Oréal from an SME, founded in 1909 by Eugène Schueller, into the world's leading cosmetics and beauty products company.

== Biography ==
François Dalle was the son of Joseph Dalle, a brewer in Hesdin in Pas-de-Calais, and Jeanne Dalle, née Dumont.

As a law student François Dalle lived with the Marist Fathers at 104 rue de Vaugirard in Paris. While there, he forged friendships with André Bettencourt and François Mitterrand. A brilliant student, he was ranked among the best students in the Faculty of Law of Paris, where he achieved a law degree. At the time, he had the ambition of pursuing a career in law, but the fall of France to the Nazis in 1940 forced him to give up working for his agrégation (teaching certificate), and to continue on this path.

For a time a lawyer at the Paris Court of Appeal, from 1941 to 1942, he met Eugène Schueller through his friend André Bettencourt.. After a brief interview he was hired at "half of today’s French statutory minimum wage" as assistant to the secretary of the sales director at the Monsavon factory in Clichy (92), and rapidly rose through the company's ranks to become factory manager then chief executive officer of the Monsavon company in 1945. He became CEO of L’Oréal in 1948 before being appointed chairman and CEO on the death of Eugène Schueller in 1957, a post he would occupy without interruption from 1957 to 1984, making him one of the longest-serving chairmen and CEOs of a CAC 40 company. In 1984, at the age of 64, he stepped down in favour of Charles Zviak to become chairman of L’Oréal's Strategic Committee, until 1990. He remained a director of the committee until 2005.

Among his other key responsibilities in private companies, he was also on the board of Nestlé SA, from 1974 to 1986, later becoming its First vice-president from 1986 to 1990, before becoming a Council Member from 1990 to 2000. He was chairman & CEO then Director of Saipo from 1957 to 1999 and vice-chairman of the board of directors of Gesparai. Lastly, he was a director of the Banque Nationale de Paris (BNP) from 1973 to 1982, of les Éditions Masson from 1975 to 1984, Air Liquide from 1986 to 1992 and TV Channels stations Canal+ from 1985 to 1994 and TF1, from 1987 to 1994.

As part of his commitment to the social and economic life of France, he sat on the Conseil national du patronat français (CNPF) (CNPF; National Council of French Employers) as a member of the executive council from 1972 to 1975 after being a committee member since 1968. He was also the founding chairman in 1969 of the think tank Entreprise et Progrès, sitting as a member of the management committee until 1971, to then become honorary chairman. Lastly, he was a member of the Bureau du Conseil du Progrès Industriel from 1968.

François Dalle was heavily involved in other domains, such as training, the academic world and public institution. As such, he was founding chairman and vice-president in 1975, then honorary chairman of the Institut de l'entreprise (IDEP), founding chairman of the Institut international de prospective-Futuroscope of Poitiers from 1989 to 1999 and chairman of the management committee of the magazine Humanisme et Entreprise from 1968. In addition, he held the posts of chairman of the Institut International de l’Innovation, chairman of the Commission Nationale pour l’Industrie, and director and chairman of the Centre d’Études Littéraires et Scientifiques Appliquées (CELSA) whose creation he supported in 1957. Lastly, he was vice-president and honorary director of the Pasteur Institute from 1970 to 1978, director of the Institut Européen d'Administration des Affaires (INSEAD) from 1969 to 1973, and of the Centre de Documentation et d'Éducation Permanente (CEDEP), from 1971 to 1996.

In 1983 the magazine Le Nouvel Économiste awarded him the title of Manager of the Year.

In 1984 the French President, François Mitterrand, asked him to turn his attention to France's automotive industry. He thus delivered a report highlighting the weaknesses of French manufacturers, who were experiencing a downturn in their competitiveness and were stuck with an oversized workforce and an apparently obsolete manufacturing model. Among the economic, social and industrial measures he proposed, he notably recommended using Japanese manufacturing systems. His foresight has since been confirmed, in view of the changes experienced in the French automotive industry over the past 40 years.

François Dalle died on 9 August 2005 in Geneva in Switzerland, leaving six children: Jean-Francois, Guyonne, Pierre-Jérôme, Frédéric, Jean-Baptiste and Violaine. In keeping with his wishes, he was cremated and a mass was celebrated in his memory in the Les Invalides Church in Paris attended by, among others, Valéry Giscard d'Estaing, Lindsay Owen-Jones and Liliane Bettencourt.

== L'aventure L'Oréal ==
François Dalle has transformed a French SME into a major player in the cosmetics industry, establishing it as a global leader in beauty with brands such as L’Oréal Paris, Garnier, Mixa, Lancôme, Diesel, Biotherm, Yves Saint Laurent, and Armani.

He told the story of the company in his book L'aventure L'Oréal, published in 2001 by Éditions Odile Jacob (published in English as "The L’Oréal Adventure), in which he also shared his concepts of management and marketing, via several key principles.

== A selection of aphorisms summing up how Francois Dalle thought and acted ==
Most of the quotes below are taken from the English translation of L'aventure L'Oréal

Seize upcoming trends.

There is no progress without the quest for accomplishment.

Authority does not come only from successes achieved; it can also come from errors that one has been able to recognize and correct.

Only experience allows one to forge one's own certainties, through trial and corrected error.

I always made sure that the bivouac spirit, that of being on the road and in the factory, prevailed over the high command of administrative offices.

To "find", takes superior minds, because only superior minds are capable of surrounding themselves with other superior minds who in turn are likely to find.

Capitalism can only be justified to the extent that it leads to abundance.

There is no limit to the creation of value.

We learned it from experience: the smallest difference in quality is ultimately always noticed by the consumer.

The primacy of the consumer must be applied throughout an entire company.

The information gleaned about a market in a nascent state is of inestimable value because it has not yet been interpreted, and is therefore not distorted.

== Publications ==
- L’Entreprise du futur, avec Jean Bounine-Cabalé, Paris, Calmann-Lévy, 1971
- Quand l’entreprise s’éveille à la conscience sociale, avec Jean Bounine-Cabalé et Jacques Monod (préf.), Paris, Robert Laffont, 1975
- Dynamique de l’auto-réforme de l’entreprise, avec Nicolas Thiéry, Paris, Masson, 1976
- L’éducation en entreprise : contre le chômage des jeunes, avec Jean Bounine-Cabalé, Paris, Editions Odile Jacob, 1993
- Le sursaut, entretiens avec François Roche, Paris, Calmann-Lévy, 1994
- L’aventure L’Oréal, Paris, Odile Jacob, 2001 (published in English as The L’Oréal Adventure)

== Controversy ==
In 1989, the "L'Oréal scandal" erupted. Businessman Jean Frydman accused François Dalle of having forced him to resign from the management committee of Paravision, L'Oréal's audiovisual subsidiary in which he held 25% of the shares. The reason for his ousting was allegedly to satisfy the demands of the Arab League, which was boycotting any company with direct or indirect links with Israel. The accusation turned into a State matter. Each party's past came out, while L’Oréal was accused having been a refuge for ex-members of La Cagoule and former Second World War collaborators. François Mitterrand was accused of having interfered and lied on behalf of his friends François Dalle and André Bettencourt. The latter was later obliged to step down from leadership of the company after revelations about his past. On 20 November 1991, François Dalle was charged with document forgery and racial discrimination but the charges were later dismissed.

== Honours ==
- Commander of the Legion of Honour
- Commander of theNational Order of Merit
- Resistance medal
- Commander of the Palmes Académiques
- Commander of the Order of Merit of the Italian Republic
