= Thomas Clair =

Canadian politician

Thomas Clair (January 28, 1856 – July 3, 1917) was a merchant and political figure in New Brunswick. He represented Madawaska County in the Legislative Assembly of New Brunswick from 1903 to 1908 as a Liberal member.

== Biography ==
He was born in Ireland, the son of Peter Clair and Anne Underwood. Clair came to New Brunswick with his parents and was educated at Clair. He became a merchant and was also involved in the trade in lumber. In 1880, he married Georgina Levesque. Clair was defeated in the 1908 provincial election. He later worked for the Intercolonial Railway. He died in Clair.
