= Moffat (surname) =

Moffat or Moffatt is a surname of Scottish origin (see Clan Moffat). It may refer to:

- Abbot Low Moffat (1901–1996), American politician and diplomat
- Aidan Moffat (born 1973), Scottish musician with the band Arab Strap
- Alex Moffat (disambiguation), several people
- Alf Moffat (1870–1956), Australian sportsman and administrator
- Alfred Edward Moffat (1863–1950), Scottish musician, composer and collector of music
- Alistair Moffat (born 1950), Scottish writer and journalist
- Allan Moffat (1939–2025), Canadian-Australian racing driver
- Anne Moffat (born 1958), Scottish politician
- Anthony Moffat, Canadian professor of astronomy
- Ariane Moffatt (born 1979), Canadian singer-songwriter
- Bernard Moffatt (born 1946), Manx political campaigner and trade unionist
- Charles Douglas Moffatt (1870–1953), English-Argentine footballer
- David Moffat (disambiguation), several people named David or Dave Moffat or Moffatt
- Donald Moffat (1930–2018), Canadian artist
- Ellen Moffat (born 1954), Canadian artist
- George Moffat (disambiguation), several people named George Moffat or Moffatt
- Geraldine Moffat (born 1939), English actress
- Graham Moffat (1866–1951), Scottish actor, director, playwright and spiritualist
- Graham Moffatt (1919–1965), English actor
- Henry Moffat (1855–1926), American football player and physician
- John Marks Moffatt (died 1802), English antiquarian
- Karyn Moffat, Canadian computer scientist
- Howard Unwin Moffat (1869–1951), Rhodesian politician
- Hugh Moffat (disambiguation), several people
- James Moffat (disambiguation), several people named James Moffat or Moffatt
- Jay Pierrepont Moffat (1896–1943), American diplomat
- Jay Pierrepont Moffat, Jr. (1932–2020), American diplomat
- Jerry Moffatt (born 1963), British climber
- John Moffat (disambiguation), several people
- John Moffatt (disambiguation), several people
- John Keith Moffat (born 1943), American biophysicist
- Jovante Moffatt (born 1996), American football player
- Keith Moffatt (born 1935), Scottish mathematician and fluid dynamicist
- Keith Moffatt (athlete) (born 1984), American high jumper
- Laura Moffatt (born 1954), British politician
- Martin Moffat (1884–1946), Irish soldier, recipient of the Victoria Cross
- Michael Moffat (born 1985), Scottish footballer
- Michel Moffatt, American politician
- Mike Moffat (disambiguation), several people
- Nicholas de Moffat (died 1270), Scottish cleric
- Nicky Moffat (born 1962), British army officer
- Peter Moffatt (1922–2007), British television director
- Peter Moffat (born 1962), British playwright and screenwriter
- Robert Moffat (disambiguation), several people
- Scarlett Moffatt (born 1990), English television personality
- Scott Moffatt (born 1983), Canadian musician
- Sean Moffat, Australian musician, member of No Fixed Address
- Seth C. Moffatt (1841–1887), American politician from Michigan
- Siue Moffat (born 1973), Canadian writer and activist
- Steven Moffat (born 1961), Scottish television writer and producer
- Tracey Moffatt (born 1960), Australian photographic artist
- William Moffat (disambiguation), several people

== See also ==
- Moffett (surname)
- Moffitt (disambiguation)
