= Charles White =

Charles or Charlie White may refer to:

== Artists and authors ==
- Charles W. White (1918–1979), African-American painter, printmaker, muralist
- Charles White (writer) (1845–1922), Australian journalist and author
- Charlie White (artist) (born 1972), American photographer

== Politics ==
- Charles Frederick White (1863–1923), British MP for West Derbyshire, 1918–1923
- Charles Frederick White (Labour politician) (1891–1956), his son, British MP for West Derbyshire, 1944–1950
- Charles A. White (1882–1925), American organized labor lobbyist, Illinois state representative
- Charles William White (Irish politician) (1838–1890), member of parliament for Tipperary, 1866–1875
- Charles P. White (born 1970), Indiana secretary of state, 2011–2012
- Charles White (New Zealand politician) (1880–1966), New Zealand lawyer, member of the New Zealand Legislative Council
- Charles William White (California politician) (1886–1969)

== Sports ==
- Charles White (American football) (1958–2023), American football player, Heisman Trophy winner
- Tom White (runner) (Charles Thomas White, 1917–1985), English runner
- Charlie White (footballer, born 1880), English footballer, see List of Bury F.C. players (1–24 appearances)
- Charlie White (footballer) (1889–1925), English football player for Watford
- Charlie White (figure skater) (born 1987), American ice dancer
- Charles White (cricketer) (1823–1873), cricketer
- Charlie White (rugby union) (1874–1941), Australian rugby union player
- Charlie White (baseball) (1927–1998), Major League Baseball catcher
- Charlie White (American football) (born 1953), American football player
- Chuck White (coach) (1941–2019), American basketball coach
- Charlie White (runner) (born 1956), American middle-distance runner, All-American for the Illinois Fighting Illini track and field team

== Others ==
- Charles White (Dr Rock) (born 1942), Irish-born BBC Radio and television presenter
- Charles White (physician) (1728–1813), English surgeon and man-midwife, co-founder of the Manchester Royal Infirmary
- Charles Abiathar White (1826–1910), American geologist, paleontologist, and writer
- Charles M. White (1891–1977), American steel industrialist
- Charles Daniel White (1879–1955), American prelate of the Roman Catholic Church
- Charles Ignatius White (1807–1878), American editor, historian, and Catholic priest
- Charles White (chef) (born 1976), American trained chef and author
- Charles White (entertainer) (1815–1900), minstrel performer and theater manager
- Chuck White, a fictional character in American Dad!
- Sir C. A. White (Charles Arnold White, 1858–1931), Indian lawyer and judge
- Charles Alfred White (1869–1954), Australian Presbyterian minister
- Charles E. White Jr. (1876–1936), Chicago area architect
- Charles Lincoln White (1863–1941), president of Colby College, Maine
- Charles Powell White (1867–1930), English pathologist and cancer researcher
- MoistCr1tikal (Charles White, born 1994), American YouTuber and Twitch streamer

== See also ==
- Charley White (1891–1959), English-American boxer
- Charles Whyte (1866–1949), Scottish astronomer
