= Moffet =

Moffet may refer

- Moffet Inlet, Nunavut, Canada
- Moffet, Quebec, Canada
- Doctor Charles Henry Moffet, a character on the TV series Airwolf
- Mount Moffett, a stratovolcano on Adak Island, Alaska, US

== People with the surname ==
- Alicia Moffet (born 1998), Canadian singer
- Jane Moffet (1930–2018), American baseball player
- Joe Moffet (1859–1935), American baseball player
- John Moffet (disambiguation)
- Sam Moffet (1857–1907), American baseball player
- Thomas Moffet (or Muffet, 1553–1604), English naturalist and physician

== See also ==
- Moffat (disambiguation)
- Moffett (disambiguation)
- Moffitt (disambiguation)
