= John Moffat =

John Moffat may refer to:

- John Alston Moffat (1825–1904), Canadian entomologist
- John Moffat (physicist) (born 1932), professor and physicist
- John Keith Moffat (born 1943), professor and biophysicist at the University of Chicago
- John Moffat (missionary) (1835–1918), British missionary and imperial agent in southern Africa
- John Moffat (mining pioneer) (1841–1918), Scottish-born mining entrepreneur in Australia
- John Moffat (Royal Navy officer) (1919–2016), Royal Navy Fleet Air Arm pilot
- John Moffatt (actor) (1922–2012), English actor and playwright

== See also ==
- Jack Moffitt (disambiguation)
- John Moffitt (disambiguation)
- John Moffatt (disambiguation)
- John Moffet (disambiguation)
