= TVAC (disambiguation) =

TVAC is the abbreviation for The Vehicle Application Centre, a British company.

TVAC may also refer to:

- Thermal vacuum chamber
- Tippecanoe Valley Athletic Conference, Indiana, United States
- Tweed Valley Adventist College, Nimbin, Australia
- Teaneck Volunteer Ambulance Corps, serving Teaneck, New Jersey, United States
- Tennessee Valley Athletic Conference, a successor of the Volunteer State Athletic Conference, United States
- Tennessee-Virginia Athletic Conference, a predecessor of the Appalachian Athletic Conference, United States
- Thalidomide Victims Association of Canada, founded by survivors of the thalidomide scandal
- Toronto Video Activist Collective, founded by Jonathan Culp and other videographers
