= Keith Moffatt (disambiguation) =

Keith Moffatt (born 1935) is a Scottish mathematician. Keith Moffatt and similar names may also refer to:

- Keith Moffatt (athlete) (born 1984), American high jumper
- John Keith Moffat (born 1943), University of Chicago biophysicist
- Keith Moffitt, British Liberal Democrat local government politician

== See also ==
- Moffat (surname)
