= John Moffitt =

John Moffitt or John Moffit may refer to:

- John A. Moffit, co-founder of the United Hatters of North America
- John Moffitt (American football) (born 1986), American football offensive lineman
- John Moffitt (director), U.S. television director
- John Moffitt (long jumper) (born 1980), U.S. long jumper
- John C. Moffitt (1901–1969), American screenwriter and film critic, usually credited as Jack Moffitt
- John H. Moffitt (1843–1926), U.S politician and war veteran

== See also ==
- Jack Moffitt (disambiguation)
- John Moffatt (disambiguation)
- John Moffet (disambiguation)
