= Moffa =

Moffa is a surname. Notable people with the surname include:

- Marina Moffa (born 1964), Australian basketball player
- Paolo Moffa (1915–2004), Italian film director, producer, and screenwriter
- Silvano Moffa (born 1951), Italian politician and journalist

== See also ==
- Moffat (disambiguation)
