= Moffat =

Moffat or Moffatt may refer to:

== Places ==
=== Scotland ===
- Moffat, Dumfries and Galloway, a burgh and parish
- Moffat Hills, a range in the Southern Uplands
- Moffat Water, a minor river in Dumfriesshire

=== United States ===
- Moffat, Colorado, a town
- Moffat County, Colorado
- Moffat Tunnel, a railroad tunnel in Colorado
- Moffatt Township, Michigan
- Moffat, Texas, an unincorporated community
- Moffat, a late 19th-century name of Satank, Colorado

=== Elsewhere ===
- Moffat Beach, Queensland, Australia
- Mount Moffat, Antarctica

== People ==
- Moffat (surname), a list of people with the surname Moffat or Moffatt
- Moffat (given name), a list of people with the given name Moffat or Moffatt
- Clan Moffat, Scottish clan

== Arts and entertainment ==
- The Moffatts, Canadian band
- The Moffats, a children's novel by Eleanor Estes
- Irene Moffat, a character in the 1987 American fantasy comedy movie Harry and the Hendersons
- Sarah Moffat, a fictional television character from Upstairs, Downstairs

== Other uses ==
- Moffat (company), an appliance brand originally from Australia
- Moffat Communications, a regional cable TV company in Winnipeg, Canada
- Moffat Academy, a school in Moffat, Dumfries and Galloway, Scotland
- Moffat Library, Washingtonville, New York
- Moffat toffee, a confection made in Moffat, Scotland
- Moffat or Moffatt, later name of Boyne (1807 ship)
- 5542 Moffatt, an asteroid

== See also ==
- Moffat v Moffat, a 1984 New Zealand law case
- Moffat distribution, a probability distribution based upon the Lorentzian distribution
- Moffatt, New Translation, a 1926 translation of the Bible
- Moffatt oxidation, a chemical reaction
- Moffett (disambiguation)
- Moffitt (disambiguation)
