= Moffett (surname) =

Moffett is a surname. Notable people with the surname include:

- Charles Moffett (1929–1997), American free jazz drummer
- Charnett Moffett (1967–2022), American jazz bassist, son of Charles
- Charles Simonton Moffett (1945–2015), American art curator
- Cleveland Moffett (1863–1926), American journalist, author, and playwright
- Doctor Charles Henry Moffet, fictional character in Airwolf
- D. W. Moffett (b. 1954), American actor
- David Moffett (b. 1957), Australian executive businessman
- Edna Virginia Moffett (1870–1962), American historian, college professor
- Georgia Tennant (née Moffett) (b. 1984), English actress
- Howard Moffett, American politician
- James Andrew Moffett, II (1886–1953), petroleum executive, chairman Bahrain Petroleum Company (BAPCO), California-Texas Oil Company, Ltd. (CALTEX), head of the Federal Housing Administration
- Jonathan "Sugarfoot" Moffett (b. 1954), American drummer
- Judith Moffett (b. 1942), author of Pennterra, a science fiction novel
- Lacy Irvine Moffett (1878–1957), American missionary minister, ornithologist, and photographer.
- Peter Moffett (b. 1951), who acts under the stage name Peter Davison
- Sharyn Moffett (1936–2021), American child actor
- Thomas William Moffett (1820–1908), Irish scholar
- William A. Moffett (1869–1933), American admiral
- William Andrew Moffett (1933–1995), American historian and librarian

== See also ==
- Moffat (surname)
- Moffatt (disambiguation)
- Moffitt (disambiguation)
