= Muffat =

Muffat is a surname. Notable people with the surname include:

- Camille Muffat (1989–2015), French swimmer
- Georg Muffat (1653–1704), Baroque composer and organist
- Gottlieb Muffat (1690–1770), Austrian baroque composer, son of Georg Muffat

== See also ==
- Moffat (surname)
