= Humberside Fire and Rescue Service =

Fire and rescue service in Yorkshire and eastern England

Operational area
- Country: England
- County: East Riding of Yorkshire; Parts of Lincolnshire

Agency overview
- Established: 1974
- Annual calls: 11,925 (2025)
- Employees: 992 operational 33 control room staff 254 support staff
- Chief Fire Officer: Phil Shillito
- EMS level: BLS

Facilities and equipment
- Divisions: 4
- Stations: 30
- Engines: 44 (10 reserves)
- Rescues: 3
- Ambulances: 2 co-responder vehicles
- HAZMAT: 1 New Dimensions decontamination unit
- Rescue boats: 4
- Aerial Ladder Platforms: 4

Website
- www.humbersidefire.gov.uk

Humberside Fire and Rescue Service (HFRS) is the statutory fire and rescue service covering the area of what was the county of Humberside (1974–1996), but now consists of the unitary authorities of East Riding of Yorkshire, Kingston upon Hull, North Lincolnshire and North East Lincolnshire in northern England.

== History ==
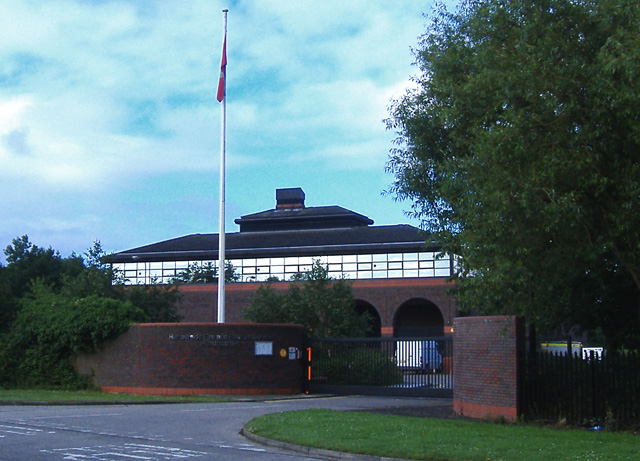
Service Headquarters near Hessle

Humberside Fire Brigade was formed in 1974 as a result of the Fire Services Act 1947 stating that all areas must have an official fire service; the brigade would later change its name to Humberside Fire and Rescue Service to reflect its expanded role in emergency cover after the county boundary changes on 1974. When Humberside County Council was abolished in 1995, a parliamentary combination order came into effect, establishing Humberside Fire Authority (the current ruling body of Humberside Fire Brigade) with control of all brigade personnel, equipment and premises. This is a combined fire authority, which is financed by the constituent councils of East Riding of Yorkshire Council, Kingston upon Hull City Council, North Lincolnshire Council and North East Lincolnshire Council.

In January 1987, Christine Bradley of Howden became Humberside Fire Brigade's first female firefighter. Twenty years later in 2007, HFRS featured on a BBC One documentary entitled Women on Fire, following two female firefighters during a 16-day intensive training course to allow them to become retained firefighters for the service.

In 2016, in line with other fire and police force mergers, a proposal was put forward that Humberside Fire and Rescue merge with the North Yorkshire Fire and Rescue Service. However, the proposal was not backed by the leaders of county councils and emergency commissioners in the Humberside operating area, and so the merger proposal was shelved.

== Performance ==
Every fire and rescue service in England and Wales is periodically subjected to a statutory inspection by His Majesty's Inspectorate of Constabulary and Fire & Rescue Services (HMICFRS). The inspections investigate how well the service performs in each of three areas. On a scale of outstanding, good, requires improvement and inadequate, Humberside Fire and Rescue Service was rated as follows:

HMICFRS Inspections Humberside
Area	Rating 2018/19	Rating 2021/22	Description
Effectiveness	Good	Good	How effective is the fire and rescue service at keeping people safe and secure from fire and other risks?
Efficiency	Good	Good	How efficient is the fire and rescue service at keeping people safe and secure from fire and other risks?
People	Requires improvement	Good	How well does the fire and rescue service look after its people?

== Fire stations ==
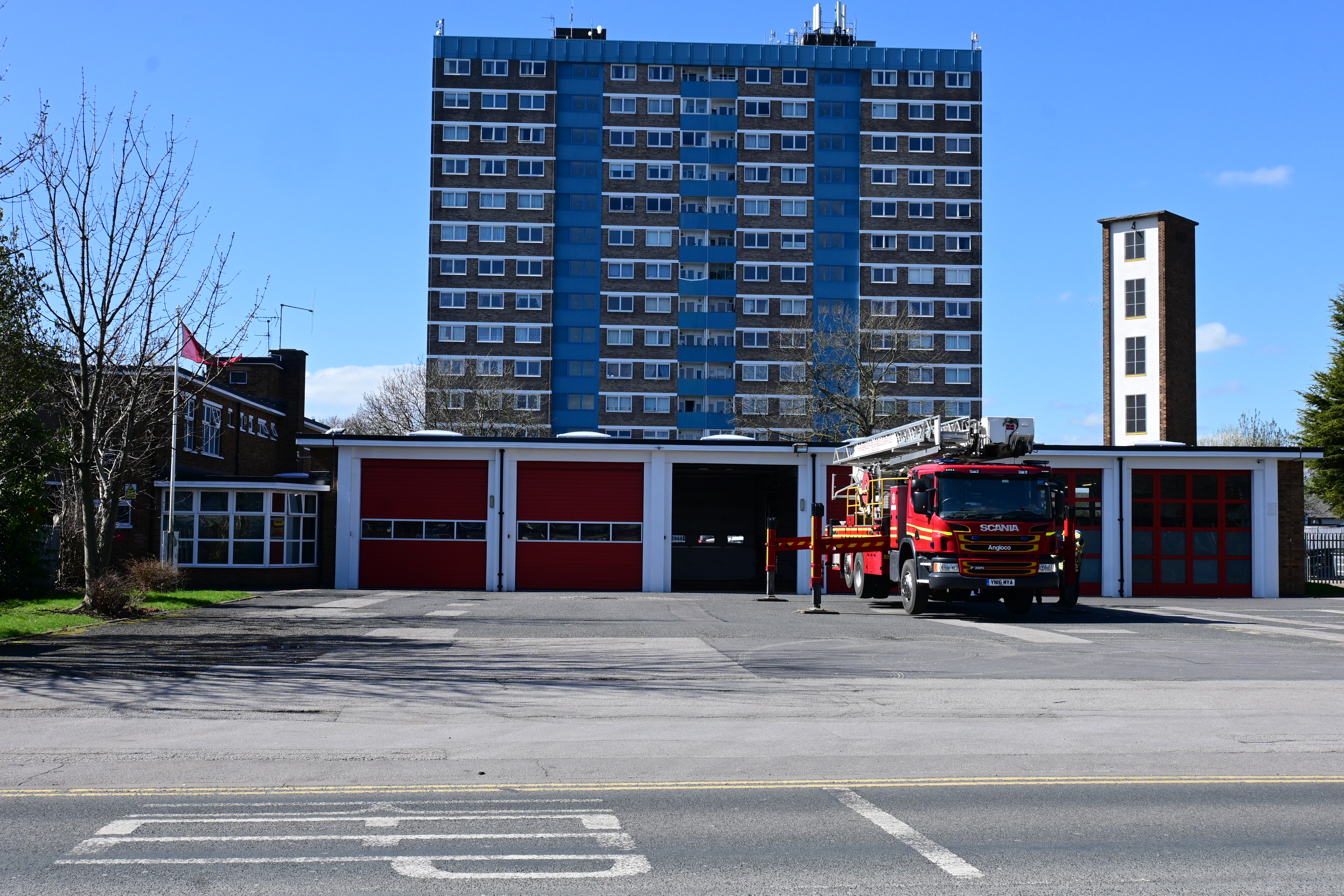
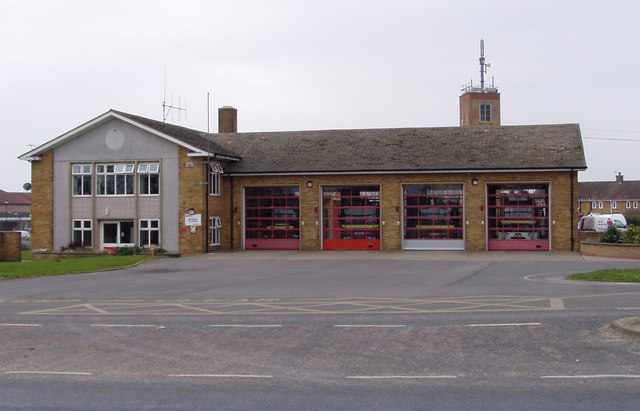
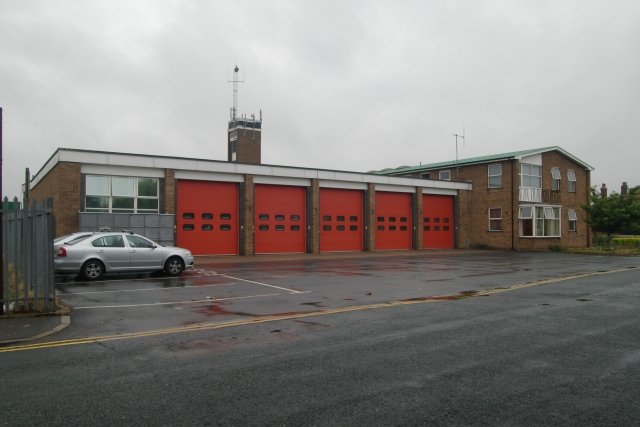
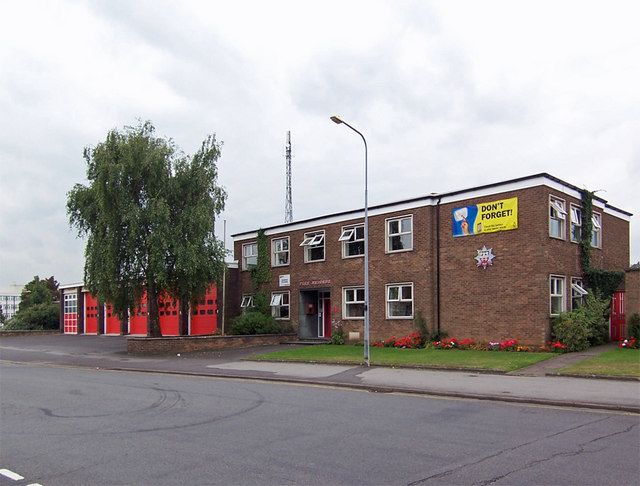
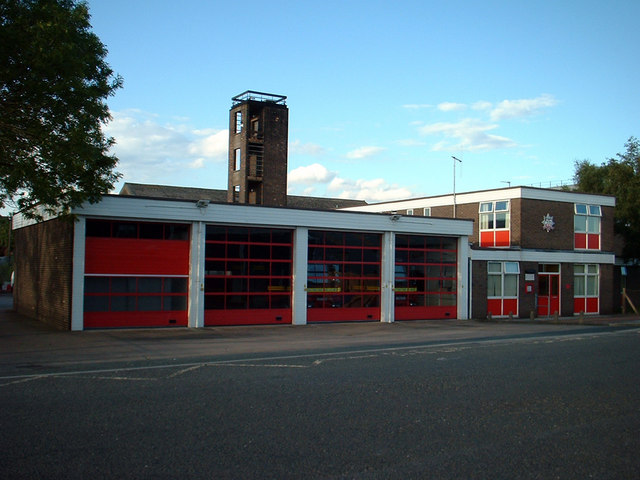
Clockwise from top left: Some of the service's major fire stations in Kingston upon Hull, Bridlington, Goole, Scunthorpe and Grimsby

HFRS operates 30 fire stations. These stations are strategically located to provide suitable coverage for the region. Nine of these stations are wholetime, three stations are wholetime and retained, and 18 stations are retained only. The 30 stations are divided into four Community Protection Units (CPUs), with each one covering a different area.

The headquarters of HFRS are located on the western outskirts of Hull on Summergroves Way near the boundary with Hessle. This building houses the majority of the service's administration and support services including Stores, IT, Health & Safety, Training etc. The fire station at Immingham West doubles up as a training facility and has a Class 332 railway carriage for crews to practise on railway rescues.

On 1 January 2013, plans were submitted to Hull City Council expressing Humberside Fire and Rescue Service's intention to replace Clough Road fire station with a new £3.9 million facility on the existing site. Planning permission was granted by Hull City Council in April 2013, and the new station became operational in July 2015. Two new fire stations in central Hull and Brough were opened in 2017, and in 2018, the £9 million Jean Bishop Integrated Care Centre (ICC), part of which contains a new fire station for the East Hull area, was opened. Plans were approved in 2022 to extend Hornsea fire station by adding a new appliance bay, accommodating one of two new Rapid Intervention Vehicles acquired from Gatwick Airport in 2022, and HFRS announced in August 2024 that its Howden station was to be rebuilt, scheduled for completion in 2025.

Only two fire stations have been closed by HFRS since its formation in 1974. The first was Sledmere fire station, a single-appliance retained station closed in 2008 as part of cost-saving measures. The second was Cromwell Road fire station in Grimsby, which closed during 2025 due to low usage after it had previously been reduced in 2014 from two appliances to one stationed on standby overnight.

== Appliances ==
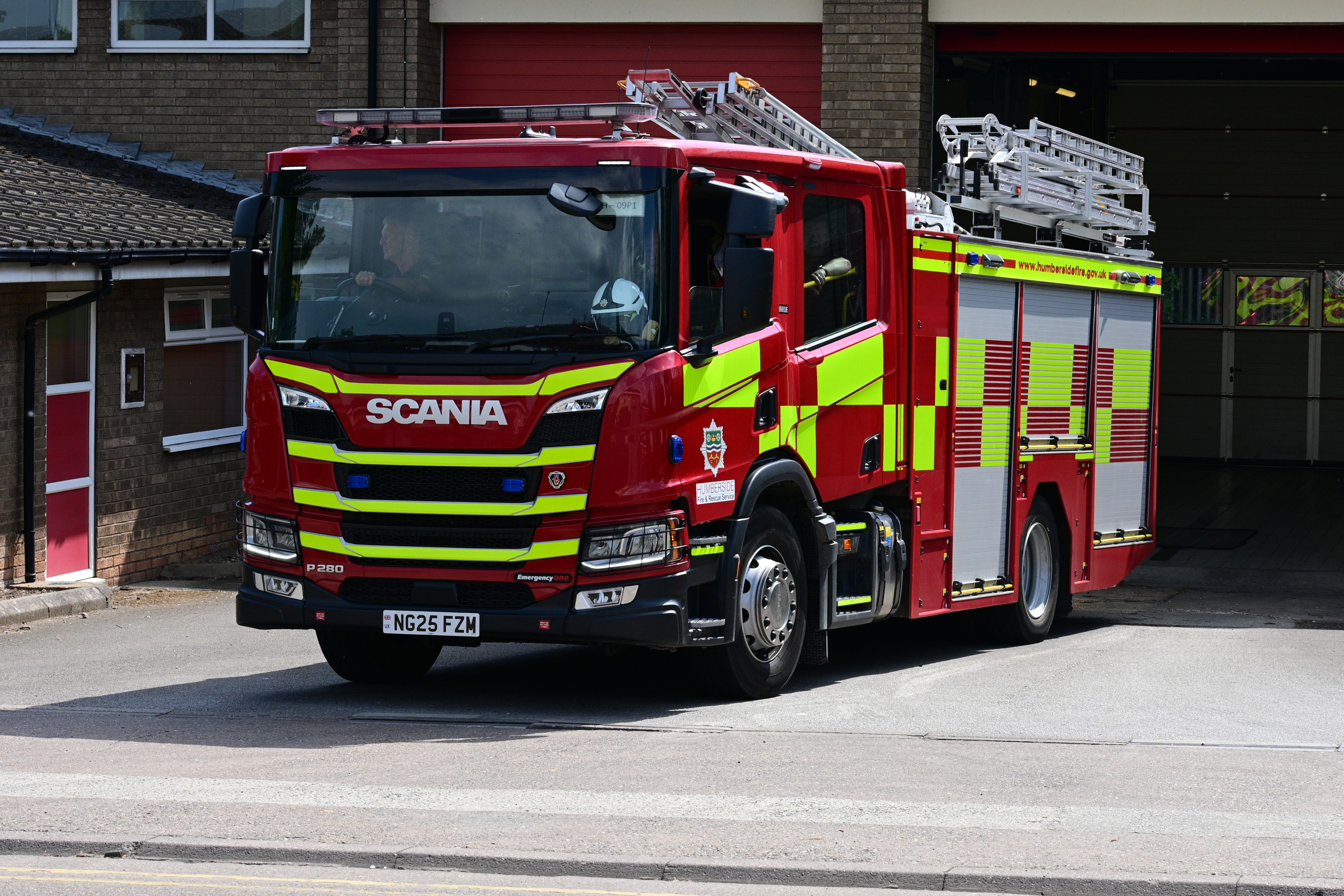
A Scania P280 fire appliance in Bransholme, Kingston upon Hull

As of 2026, HFRS operates a fleet of 44 fire engines, including ten that are placed in strategic reserve. The frontline fleet of appliances is based on the Scania PRT-range as well as the Scania 4-series chassis; in 2018, HFRS became the first fire service in the United Kingdom to take delivery of Scania 'New Generation' PRT-range appliances, with a pair of P320s fitted with EmergencyOne bodies entering service as Rescue Support Units in Kingston upon Hull and Scunthorpe.

In 2005, Humberside Fire and Rescue ordered two Combined Aerial Rescue Pump (CARP) fire appliances, manufactured by TVAC on the Mercedes-Benz Econic chassis. The South Yorkshire Fire and Rescue Service also made an order for four similar appliances, with all six orders totalling £3 million. Shortly after their 2007 delivery, however, various mechanical defects emerged with both Humberside and South Yorkshire's CARP appliances, including them being too heavy for UK roads. This caused the appliances to be regularly taken off the road, with members of the Fire Brigades Union later refusing to operate them. Humberside's second order for a CARP appliance was subsequently cancelled, with TVAC going out of business shortly after reports of defects began to emerge.

== Notable incidents ==
- Flixborough disaster – 1–21 June 1974; a total of 231 firefighters and 15 fire officers from Humberside, Lincolnshire, and neighbouring West Yorkshire and Nottinghamshire responded to an explosion at the Nypro chemical plant near the North Lincolnshire village of Flixborough. 28 people were killed and 105 were injured, 36 of them seriously, with buildings for miles around destroyed or damaged by the explosion. Firefighters were stood down after 21 days at the site, during which some were deployed to prevent an additional explosion at the Normanby Park Steel Works.
- Humbrol factory, Hull – 2 November 1988; started by the ignition of acetone spilled from a forklift, a large fire and explosions at the Humbrol paint factory on Hedon Road in east Hull killed one worker and injured five others, requiring 125 Humberside firefighters and 25 appliances to extinguish the fire.
- Royal Station Hotel, Hull – 7 October 1990; up to 150 Humberside firefighters attended a large fire at the Royal Station Hotel in Hull city centre, caused by an electrical fault. Eleven of the 140 guests staying in the hotel were taken to hospital, and the building, which adjoins Hull Paragon Interchange, was completely destroyed.
- Bartoline, Beverley – 23 May 2003; Up to 150 HFRS firefighters and 28 appliances atteneced a large fire and explosions from paint and oil storage tanks at the Bartoline factory on Swinemoor Industrial Estate in Beverley. The fire, which destroyed the factory and threatened to spread to adjoining buildings, was brought under control with no injuries reported.
- 2018 United Kingdom wildfires – June–July 2018; HFRS fire crews were deployed to aid Greater Manchester and Lancashire firefighters in tackling major moorland fires on Saddleworth Moor and Winter Hill.
- Bridgewood UK plastics factory, Hessle – 24–25 November 2021; A large fire and explosions, believed to have been started accidentally, destroyed the Bridgewood UK plastics factory on the Priory Park industrial estate adjacent to the town of Hessle. Over 150 HFRS firefighters and 14 appliances were deployed to tackle the fire, which destroyed 300 tonnes of plastic and also destroyed a nearby electrical substation. All employees of the factory were accounted for, and the fire was largely extinguished over 24 hours later.

== See also ==
- Fire services in the United Kingdom
- List of British firefighters killed in the line of duty
