= Alex Moffat (disambiguation) =

Alex Moffat (born 1982) is an American actor and cast member on Saturday Night Live

Alex or Alexander Moffat may refer to:

- Alexander Moffat (1802-1872), a founder of Pembroke, Ontario. Born in Haddington, Scotland.
- Alex Moffat (American football) (1862–1914), American football player, coach and official
- Alex Moffat (trade unionist) (1904–1967), Scottish trade unionist
- Alex Moffat (rugby union) (born 1968), English rugby union player
- Alexander Moffat (born 1943), Scottish painter
- Alexander Moffat (physicist) (died 1936), Scottish minister and physicist in India

== See also ==
- Alec Moffatt (1879–1960), Australian rules footballer
