= Maffett =

Maffett is a surname. Notable people with the surname include:

- Debra Maffett (born 1956), Miss America 1983
- James Thompson Maffett (1837–1912), Republican member of the U.S. House of Representatives from Pennsylvania
- Robert Clayton Maffett (1836–1865), officer in the Confederate States Army during the American Civil War

== See also ==
- Moffett (surname)
