= Moffett =

Moffett may refer to:

- Moffett, Oklahoma, a US town
- Moffett, Texas, a US unincorporated community
- Moffett Federal Airfield, Santa Clara County, California
- USS Moffett (DD-362), a US Navy destroyer
- Moffett (surname), people with the surname Moffett

== See also ==
- Moffat (disambiguation)
- Moffatt (disambiguation)
- Moffitt (disambiguation)
- Moffet (disambiguation)
