= Sons of Neptune (campaign group) =

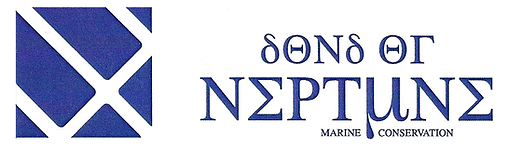
- Founded: 1983
- Purpose: Water pollution
- Region served: Scarborough, Yorkshire
- Key people: Frankie Drabble, leader
- Volunteers: 6
- Website: sonsofneptune.co

The Sons of Neptune are an environmental campaign group in Scarborough, North Yorkshire, England. They were founded in 1983 by a group of local residents and sea swimmers who noted a decline in water quality and biodiversity. They campaigned against the disposal of sewage at sea by Yorkshire Water.

== Formation ==
The Sons of Neptune was formed from a group of middle-aged men who regularly swam in the sea off Scarborough. The seas here have been held to have therapeutic properties for more than 300 years. During the late 1970s they noticed a decline in the clarity of the water and in marine biodiversity, which they attributed to the presence of sewage in the water. The group formed in 1983 and consisted of solicitor Freddie Drabble, chiropodist and rock and roll historian Charles White, accountant Chris Found, teacher Geoff Nunn, bookmaker Cecil Ridley and Pilkington Glass marketing manager Bryan Dew. The group's name was inspired by Neptune, the Roman god of the sea, and the Sons of the Desert, the Laurel and Hardy fan club (which takes its name from the 1933 film Sons of the Desert) of which White was a member. Drabble was the group's leader; a seventh person, Olsen's Fisherman's Nautical Almanac editor Sydney Smith, was considered an unofficial or honorary seventh member.

== Campaign ==
The Sons of Neptune campaigned for better water quality in Scarborough throughout the 1980s. They opposed a sewage outfall proposed by Yorkshire Water to discharge into the North Bay. Yorkshire Water contended that the outfall was long enough that any bacteria would be killed by the cold water before it could wash ashore. The campaign contended that the bacteria could revive upon reaching the beach. The group's protests included dressing as undertakers and hooded figures to chase holidaymakers along the beach and gatecrashing other events, carrying jars of murky seawater. They also appeared on the BBC's Newsnight programme. The Sons of Neptune were opposed by Scarborough Borough Council and local tourism businesses as they thought the publicity about sewage was bad for trade. The Sons of Neptune's most famous stunt was the "Thatcherloo", a dinghy resembling a giant toilet that was piloted down the River Thames past the Houses of Parliament. The protest came after the British prime minister, Margaret Thatcher, stated that sewage discharged into the sea was treated, while the Sons of Neptune stated it was only macerated. The Thatcherloo was piloted by octogenarian Smith and Drabble was a passenger; both men were arrested by the Metropolitan Police.

The protest and others, such as South-West England's Surfers Against Sewage reflected a changing political climate on the treatment of sewage waste. From 1991 the European Union introduced water quality targets through the measures such as the Urban Waste Water Treatment Directive and Bathing Waters Directive. Yorkshire Water subsequently built new ultra-violet sewage treatment plants at Scarborough, Whitby, Bridlington and Filey. The water in North Bay was given a three star quality rating in 2021 and has been described by Drabble as "excellent". He says "Yorkshire Water has come on board and are now friends with us", but the group is still hated by some Scarborough residents.

Smith remained an honorary member until his death in 2000. Nunn moved to the Lake District and has been replaced by local resident Stuart Carlisle. In 2011 White wrote a book about the campaign, The Adventures of the Sons of Neptune. In 2021 it was announced the story of the group would be made into a film.
