= John Alston Moffat =

British-born Canadian entomologist

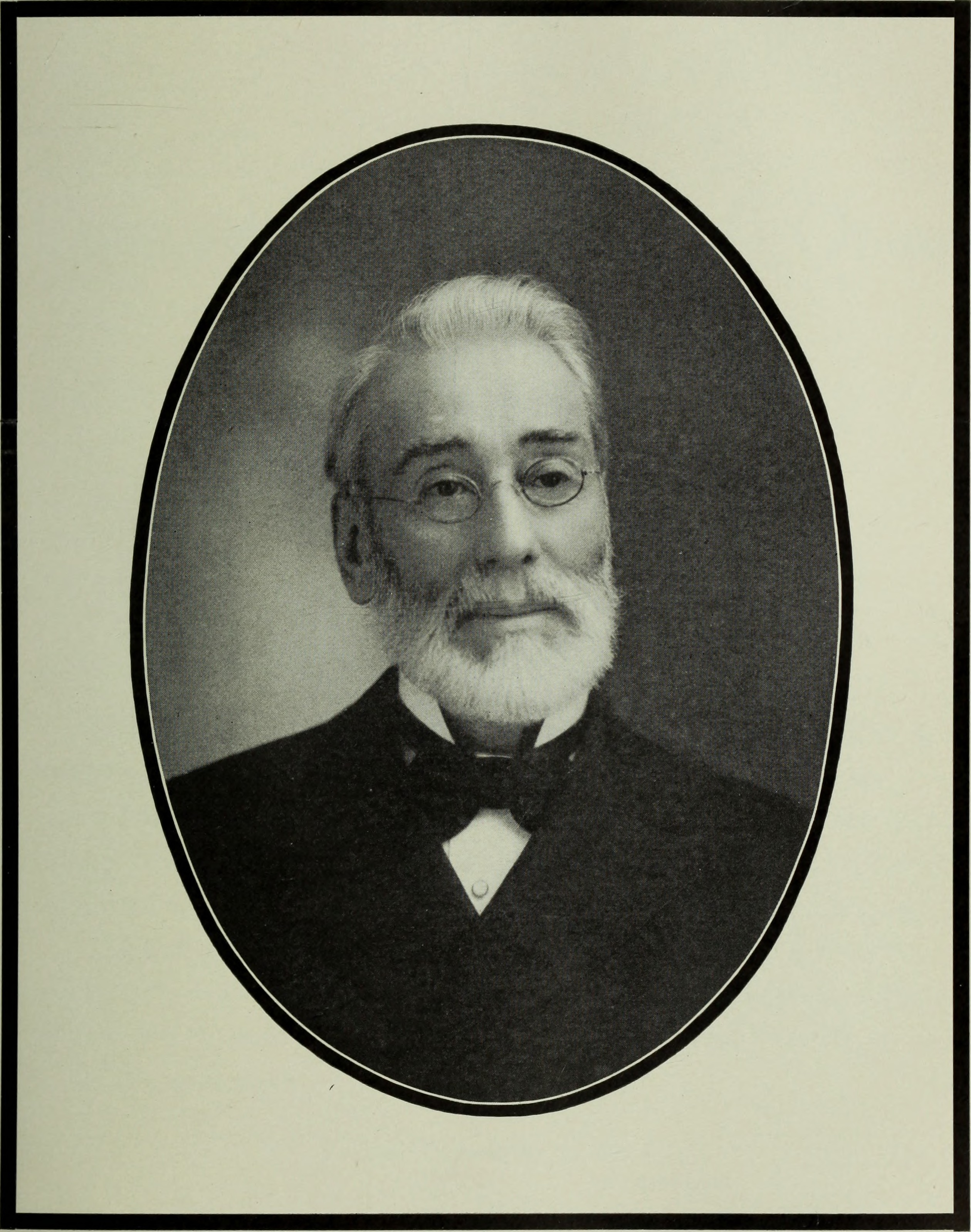

John Alston Moffat (1825 – February 26, 1904) was a British-born Canadian entomologist who served as librarian and secretary to the Entomological Society of Ontario for fourteen years.

Born in the estate of Milton, three miles from Glasgow his father's business collapsed and they moved to Glasgow. Not liking the city, he moved to New York on July 1, 1836 and then lived in Nassagaweya. His mother, a sister of John Alston of Rosemount, died back home shortly after and his father remarried. A brother of his father was Dr William Moffat who had served under Wellington in the peninsular war. An older brother lived in Binbrook where Moffat spent some years and then moved to Hamilton, Ontario, working as a merchant tailor. On walks in the country he began to study insects and later became a serious collector. Scopelosoma moffatiana was named after him by Grote, but is now considered a synonym of Pyreferra hesperidago. He then served as librarian and secretary of the Entomological Society of Ontario. He was among the first to identify the migratory behavior of monarch butterflies and noted that the movements involved multiple generations and no hibernation.

The moth Proteoteras moffatiana is named in his honor.
