= Robert Moffat =

Robert Moffat may refer to:

- Robert Moffat (missionary) (1795–1883), Scottish Congregationalist missionary to Africa, and father in law of David Livingstone
- Robert Moffat (businessman) (born 1956), senior executive at IBM
- Robert Moffat (politician) (1844–1887), New Brunswick businessman and political figure

== See also ==
- Robert Moffit (fl. 1960s–2000s), Director of the Center for Health Policy Studies at the Heritage Foundation
