= Charles Whyte =

Scottish minister and astronomer

The Rev Charles Whyte FRSE FRAS LLD (c. 1866–27 March 1949) was a 20th-century Scottish minister and astronomer. He was affectionately known as "Auld Starry".

== Life ==
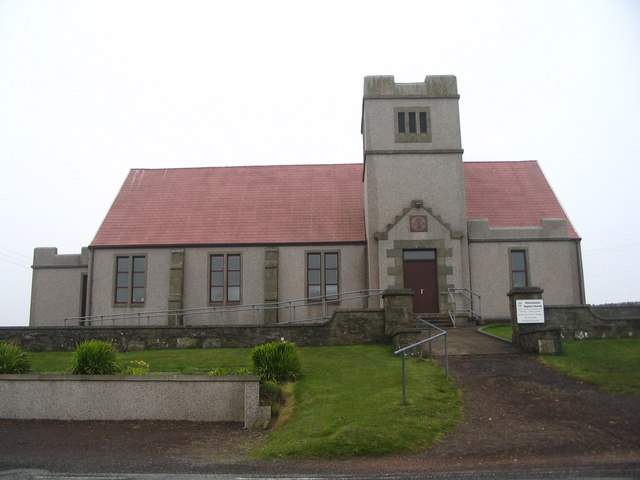
Dunrossness Free Church (now Baptist)

He was born in Dundee in 1866, and studied Divinity at St Andrews University and New College, Edinburgh. In 1892, he was licensed to preach by the Free Church of Scotland and ordained at Dunrossness. While in Shetland, he served a brief term on the Zetland County Council, representing the Dunrossness North parish in 1898.

In 1900 Whyte was one of the many in the Free Church who joined the United Free Church of Scotland. From 1917 he preached at the United Free Church of Scotland at Countesswells, in the Kingswells district west of Aberdeen, replacing Rev Walter Calder of Dyce.

In 1918 he was elected a Fellow of the Royal Society of Edinburgh for his contributions to astronomy. His proposers were Alexander Moffat, George Forbes, Sir Frank Watson Dyson, Ralph Allan Sampson, Peter Redford Scott Lang and Hector Macpherson.

Whyte celebrated his jubilee in the church in October 1942. He retired in 1947. He died in Aberdeen on 27 March 1949 aged 83. He is buried in Springbank Cemetery in Aberdeen.

== Family ==
In 1893 he married Alice Mair Birrell (died 1922). His second wife, Grace Christie, married in 1924 and later died in a car accident in Aberdeen, 27 Dec 1966 aged 82.

== Publications ==
- Our Solar System and the Stellar Universe (1923)
- Power, Intelligence and Wisdom Revealed in the Astronomical Universe (1925)
- The Constellations and Their History (1928)
- Stellar Wonders (1933)
