= Mike Moffat =

Mike Moffat may refer to:

- Mike Moffatt (born 1977), Canadian economist and economics writer
- Mike Moffat (luger) (born 1982), Canadian luger
- Mike Moffat (ice hockey) (born 1962), Canada ice hockey goaltender

== See also ==
- Michael Moffat (born 1985), Scottish footballer
- Michel Moffatt, American politician
- Mike Moffitt (born 1963), American football tight end
