= TVAC =

British commercial vehicle manufacturer

The Vehicle Application Centre
- Trade name: TVAC
- Type: Private
- Industry: Coachbuilding
- Founded: 1996
- Defunct: 2009
- Fate: Liquidation
- Successor: Plastisol
- Headquarters: Leyland, Lancashire, England
- Key people: Gary Smith (Managing Director)
- Products: Commercial vehicle chassis conversions; Refuse trucks; Fire engine bodies
- Parent: AssetCo
- Website: www.tvac.co.uk

TVAC (The Vehicle Application Centre) was a British company based in Leyland, Lancashire that performed chassis conversions and assembled bodies for commercial vehicles, refuse trucks and fire engines.

== History ==
In 1996 TVAC approached Plastisol, based in the Netherlands. At this time Plastisol produced bodies for airport crash fire engines. TVAC wanted Plastisol to produce bodies for smaller fire engines, and TVAC would assemble similar bodies under licence for the United Kingdom market.

Following a strategic investment by private equity firm Venture Private Equity and the prior acquisition of Swain Bus & Coach Ltd during 2005, in April 2006, TVAC purchased minibus manufacturer Driveline. The company was subsequently reorganised into three business units, with the operations of Swain and Driveline folded into TVAC Passenger Vehicles, emergency service vehicle building being carried out under TVAC Blue Light, and other vehicle conversions being carried out under TVAC Special Vehicle Engineering.

In 2007, TVAC and ambulance builder UV Modular were both acquired by asset and wealth management firm AssetCo, intending to consolidate AssetCo's position as the UK's largest supplier of fire appliances and ambulances. However, TVAC entered administration in December 2008 and were wound up early the next year; their intellectual property rights and some staff were subsequently acquired by former parent Plastisol. The directors of AssetCo at the time of TVAC's purchase were subsequently charged with 27 allegations of financial misconduct by the Financial Reporting Council in 2018.

== Products ==
=== Fire appliances ===
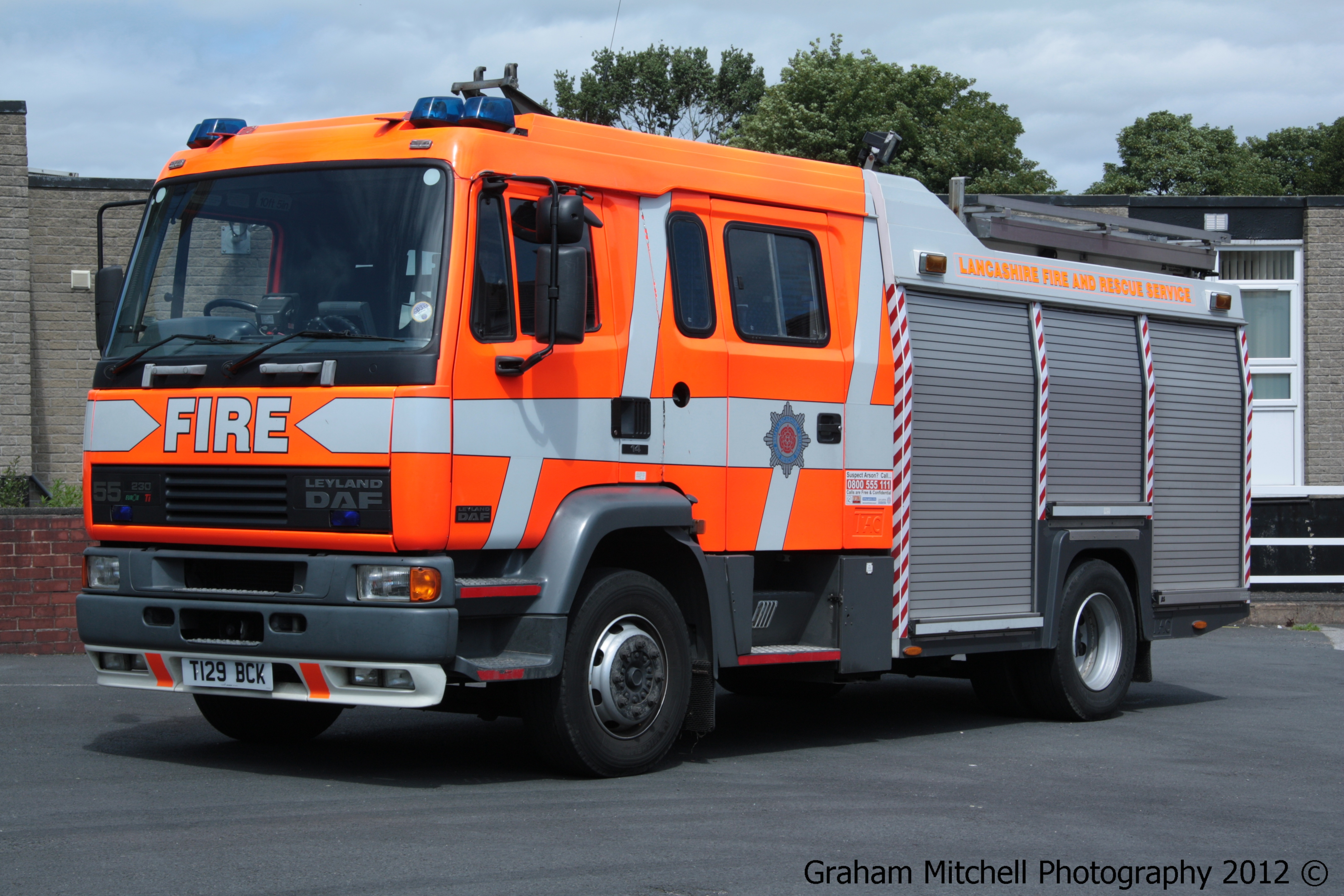
A Leyland DAF fire appliance bodied by TVAC for the Lancashire Fire and Rescue Service

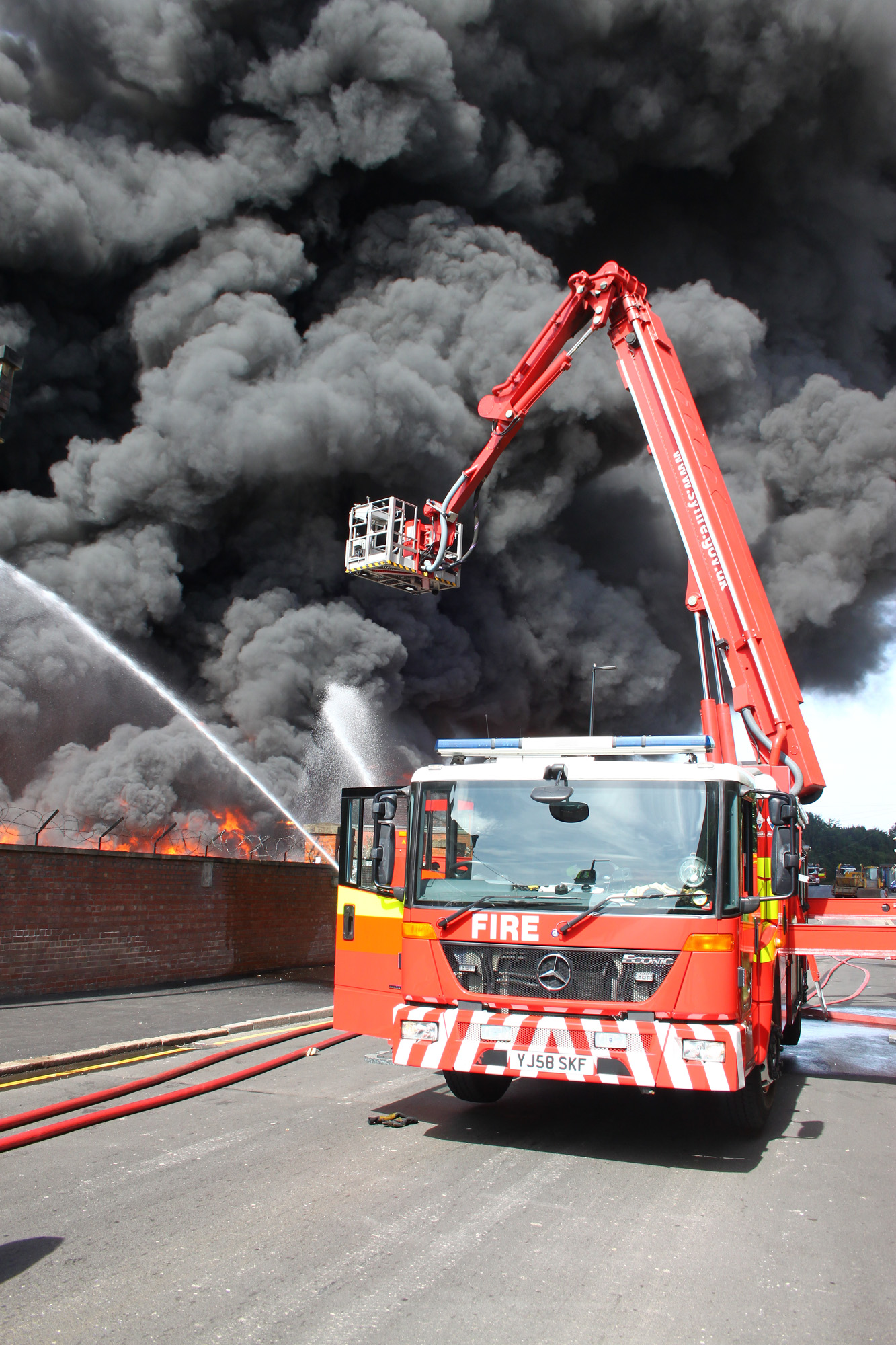
A Mercedes-Benz Econic CARP (Combined Aerial Rescue Pump) bodied by TVAC in use with South Yorkshire Fire and Rescue

The first fire engine bodied by TVAC was a Leyland DAF 55 appliance for the Lancashire Fire and Rescue Service, the brigade that covered the area where TVAC's factory was located. This body had a number of technological innovations: the bodies were made with injected resin, and were an integral unit containing the main body and water tank, making the appliance lighter, and also leaving more room for storing equipment.

Subsequent orders from, by 2006, 27 fire authorities across the United Kingdom included a major contract with the London Fire Brigade to supply frontline fire appliances, building four Unimogs with interchangeable bodies for firefighting or rescue and recovery for the Surrey Fire and Rescue Service, supplying a removable welfare pod transported by a converted Renault Master for the Derbyshire Fire and Rescue Service, and supplying a series of Iveco Daily-based midi fire engines to the Cheshire Fire and Rescue Service.

When TVAC collapsed in 2008, it was partway through completing a contract for four combined aerial response pump (CARP) appliances built on Mercedes-Benz Econic chassis for the South Yorkshire Fire and Rescue Service. One of two Econic-based CARP appliances on order for the Humberside Fire and Rescue Service was cancelled when it was discovered that Humberside's first CARP was too heavy for legal use on UK roads when fully loaded with firefighting equipment. Throughout their service, these remained in need of further modifications for mechanical and weight defects, with members of the Fire Brigades Union in South Yorkshire later refusing to operate their CARP appliances due to safety concerns.

=== Other commercial vehicles ===
TVAC were also responsible for modifying the chassis of light and heavy goods vehicles, as well as assembling refuse trucks. The company also assembled a bulletproof Vaxuhall Movano-based mobile bank for the Bank of Scotland for use on the remote Shetland Islands.
