= Pyreferra pettiti =

Scientific classification
- Domain: Eukaryota
- Kingdom: Animalia
- Phylum: Arthropoda
- Class: Insecta
- Order: Lepidoptera
- Superfamily: Noctuoidea
- Family: Noctuidae
- Genus: Pyreferra
- Species: P. pettiti

Binomial name
- Pyreferra pettiti (Grote, 1874)

Species of moth

Pyreferra pettiti is a species of cutworm or dart moth in the family Noctuidae. It is found in North America.

The MONA or Hodges number for Pyreferra pettiti is 9932.
