= Hugh Moffat =

Hugh Moffat may refer to:

- Hugh Moffat (footballer) (1885–1952), English footballer
- Hugh Moffat (politician) (1810–1884), mayor of Detroit
- Hugh Moffatt (singer) (born 1948), American country singer and songwriter
- Hugh Moffatt (footballer) (1894–1961), Australian footballer
