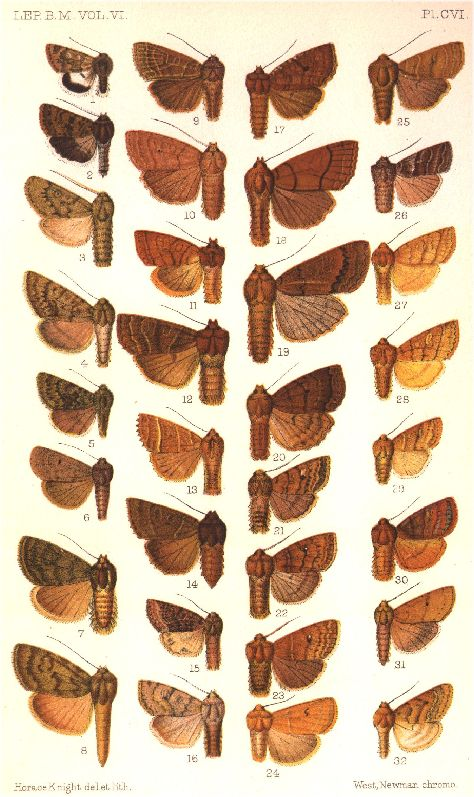
- 30

Scientific classification
- Kingdom: Animalia
- Phylum: Arthropoda
- Class: Insecta
- Order: Lepidoptera
- Superfamily: Noctuoidea
- Family: Noctuidae
- Genus: Pyreferra
- Species: P. ceromatica

Binomial name
- Pyreferra ceromatica (Grote, 1874)

= Pyreferra ceromatica =

Species of moth

Pyreferra ceromatica, the anointed sallow moth, is a species of moth native to North America. In the US state of Connecticut it is listed as a species of special concern and is believed to be extirpated. It was described by Augustus Radcliffe Grote in 1874.

== Larval foods ==
Larvae of extinct northern populations ate mostly, probably virtually entirely, witch-hazel (Hamamelis). Southern extant populations are associated with witch hazel as well, but some might use Fothergilla.

== Adult foods ==
Adults of this genus often visit sap flows of maples and birches. They almost certainly depend heavily on red maple flowers.
