= William Moffat =

William Moffat may refer to:

- William Moffat (MP) (1737–1822), English banker, merchant and politician
- William Moffat (Alberta politician) (1847–1926), Canadian politician
- William Moffat (cricketer) (1858–1932), Australian cricketer
- Graham Moffat (William Graham Moffat, 1866–1951), Scottish suffragist and playwright
- Willie Moffat (1900–1974), Scottish footballer with Hamilton, Motherwell, Hibernian

== See also ==
- William Bonython Moffatt (1812–1887), English architect
- Moffat (surname)
