= James Moffat =

James Moffat or Moffatt may refer to:

- James C. Moffat, Brisbane chemist and Sunshine Coast pastoralist
- James D. Moffat (1846–1916), president of Washington & Jefferson College
- James Moffat (author) (1922–1993), author who wrote under several pen names
- James Moffat (mathematician) (born 1948), professor of physics, University of Aberdeen
- James Moffat (engraver), Scottish engraver
- Jim Moffat (born 1960), Scottish footballer
- James Moffat (racing driver) (born 1984), Australian racing driver
- James Moffatt (1870–1944), Scottish theologian
- James Moffatt (rugby), Scottish rugby union and rugby league footballer who played in the 1890s and 1900s
