= James Moffat (mathematician) =

James Moffat FIMA CMath
- Born: 1948 (age 77–78); Scotland
- Spouse: Jaqueline Elizabeth de Leon
- Children: Louise, Katherine
- Awards: President’s Medal of the ORS; the 'nobel medal in analytics'

Academic background
- Education: University of Edinburgh; Newcastle University
- Thesis: Groups of Automorphisms of Operator Algebras (1974)
- Doctoral advisor: Prof J R Ringrose

Academic work
- Discipline: Mathematics
- Institutions: University of Aberdeen
- Main interests: Quantum gravity

James Moffat FIMA CMath is a mathematician. He was a researcher for the Ministry of Defence during the 1982 Falklands War. He wrote Complexity Theory and Network Centric Warfare, which has 275 scholarly citations.

Moffat is currently Professor of Physics at the University of Aberdeen, where he studies quantum gravity. He has published 135 articles. He is a recipient of the Napier Medal in Mathematics and the President’s Medal of the ORS; the 'nobel medal in analytics'. He is also a Fellow of OR, a Fellow of the Institute of Mathematics and its Applications, and a Chartered Mathematician. His contributions to the literature cited 560 times include new theories for Loop Quantum Gravity based on the Mathematics of Operator Algebras.

Moffat was an early writer on the topic of the Agile Organization. Business agility, generally, had been discussed before, but agility, specifically in the context of military organizations, was a new field in 2005.

== Selected publications ==
- Complexity Theory and Network Centric Warfare, citation count of 275
- The Agile Organization: From Informal Networks to Complex Effects and Agility, citation count of 138
- Command And Control In The Information Age: Representing Its Impact, citation count of 60
