= Pyreferra citrombra =

Scientific classification
- Domain: Eukaryota
- Kingdom: Animalia
- Phylum: Arthropoda
- Class: Insecta
- Order: Lepidoptera
- Superfamily: Noctuoidea
- Family: Noctuidae
- Tribe: Xylenini
- Subtribe: Xylenina
- Genus: Pyreferra
- Species: P. citrombra

Binomial name
- Pyreferra citrombra Franclemont, 1941

Species of moth

Pyreferra citrombra, the citrine sallow, is a species of cutworm or dart moth in the family Noctuidae. It is found in North America.

The MONA or Hodges number for Pyreferra citrombra is 9930.
