= Pyreferra =

Scientific classification
- Domain: Eukaryota
- Kingdom: Animalia
- Phylum: Arthropoda
- Class: Insecta
- Order: Lepidoptera
- Superfamily: Noctuoidea
- Family: Noctuidae
- Subtribe: Xylenina
- Genus: Pyreferra; Franclemont, 1937

Genus of moths

Pyreferra is a genus of moths of the family Noctuidae.

== Species ==
- Pyreferra ceromatica (Grote, 1874)
- Pyreferra citrombra Franclemont, 1941
- Pyreferra hesperidago (Guenée, 1852)
- Pyreferra pettiti (Grote, 1874)
