= Moffat (given name) =

Moffat or Moffatt is a masculine given name which may refer to:

- Moffatt Burriss (1919–2019), American businessman and politician
- Moffat Johnston (1886–1935), Scottish actor
- Moffat Mtonga (born 1983), Zambian retired footballer
- Moffatt Oxenbould (born 1943), Australian opera director
- Moffat Takadiwa (born 1983), Zimbabwean visual artist
