= Charles A. White =

American politician

Charles A. White (July 7, 1881 – October 7, 1925) was an American organized labor lobbyist and politician.

He was born in Knoxville, Tennessee, to Sarah Householder and Jesse Alexander White. Married Ruth Lillian Shaw from Ohio. Died October 7, 1925, Detroit, Michigan, buried in Woodlawn Cemetery, Ada, Ohio.

Charles left Knoxville during the early 1900s and went to St. Louis, Missouri. 1903 he began working as a conductor on an interurban railway in St. Clair County, Illinois. He joined the car men's union and soon became an active member and a champion of organized labor.

White was heavily involved in the union and in 1907 was selected as one of the Representatives of organized labor to attend the Session of the 45th Illinois General Assembly. He was a "labor lobbyist." He was only 24 years old. In 1908 he became a candidate from St. Clair County for the next Legislature. He was elected in November, 1908, by a large vote.

White found corruption in the Legislature and took it upon himself to expose it. One of the main issues was bribery. The Chicago Tribune carried stories about him. With this exposure, White lost his popularity. He called it the "Jackpot Exposure." He was crucified for his findings. William A. Prentiss wrote a booklet about Charles White telling his stories. In 1909 the Chicago Tribune paid Charles White $3,250 to publish his findings in the newspaper. After Charles gave the Tribune his story, they printed it to make him look like the "bad guy." Charles White was, at that time, the youngest member of the Illinois Legislature.
