= Moffat v Moffat =

- Court: Court of Appeal of New Zealand
- Full case name: Moffat v Moffat
- Decided: 18 April 1984
- Citation: [1984] 1 NZLR 600

Court membership
- Judges sitting: McMullin, Somers, Hardie Boys JJ

Keywords
- unconscionable bargains

Moffat v Moffat [1984] 1 NZLR 600 is a leading New Zealand case regarding unconscionable bargains.

== Background ==
Mr and Mrs Moffat after 18 years of marriage, separated and entered into a separation agreement. The separation agreement was highly one sided in favour of Mr Moffat, which not only granted him full custody of their 4 children, but also the ownership of the matrimonial house, and all its possessions. Prior to accepting, Mrs Moffat was advised by her husband's solicitor to get legal advice, but declined to do so. She signed an acknowledgement confirming this.

Mrs Moffat subsequently came to her senses and tried to have this one sided agreement set aside due to it being an unconscionable bargain. She argued, that when she entered into the agreement, she was unwell both physically and mentally, thought she might have been pregnant to a man she was having an affair with, had not taken legal advice, nor did she know the value of her interest in their house and claimed that her husband was aware of all this, and took advantage of her situation by making her accept his separation agreement.

== Decision ==
The Court of Appeal ruled that the husband took unconscionable advantage of his wife's circumstances, and accordingly set aside the separation agreement.
