= Charles White (chef) =

American trained chef and author (born 1976)

Charles Casey White (born June 10, 1976) is an American-trained chef and author.

He was one of the co-authors of Sheryl Crow's cookbook, If it makes you healthy, along with Mary Goodbody and Victoria Pearson.
