= John Moffatt (producer) =

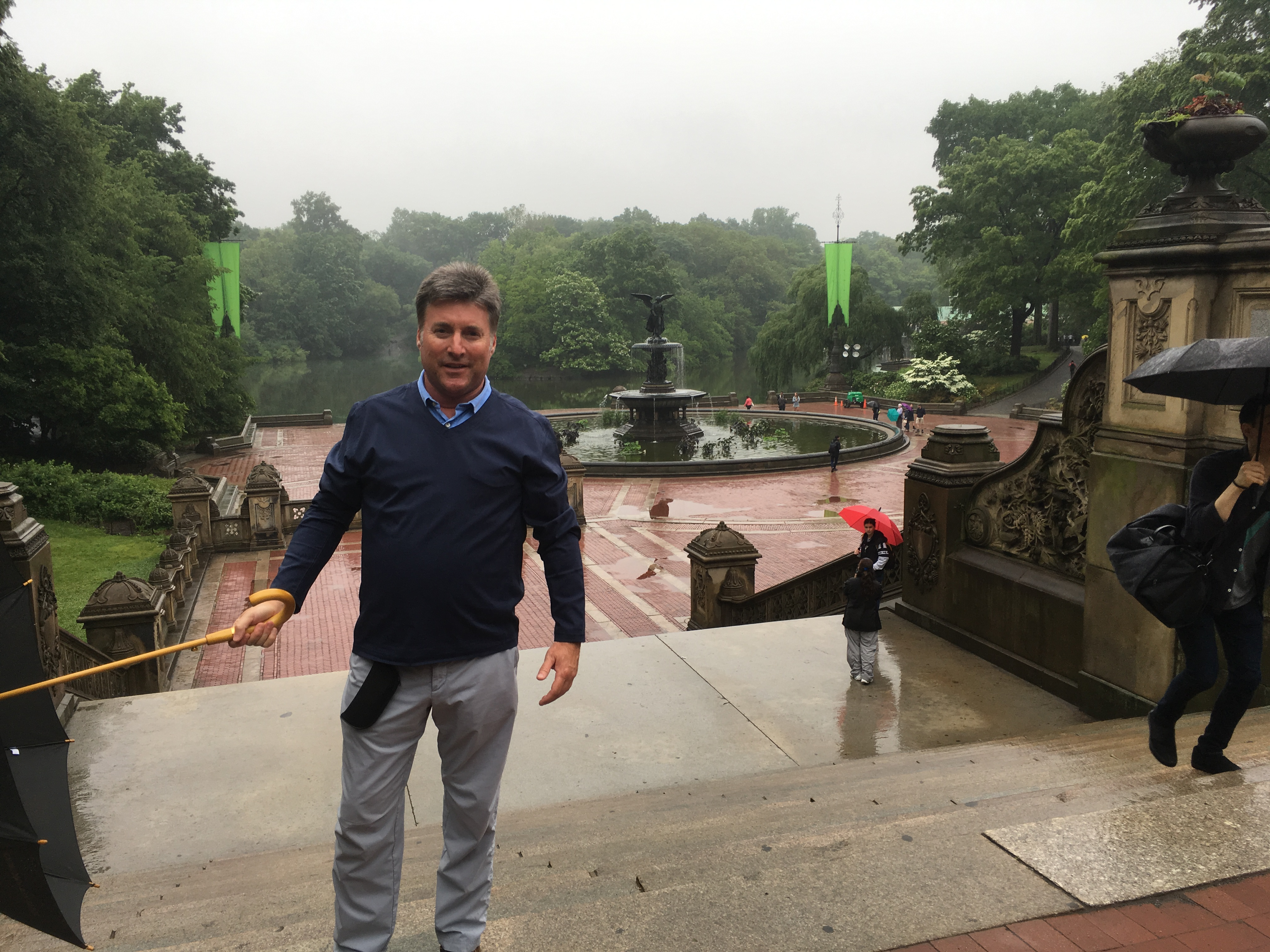
John Moffatt in New York (Central Park)

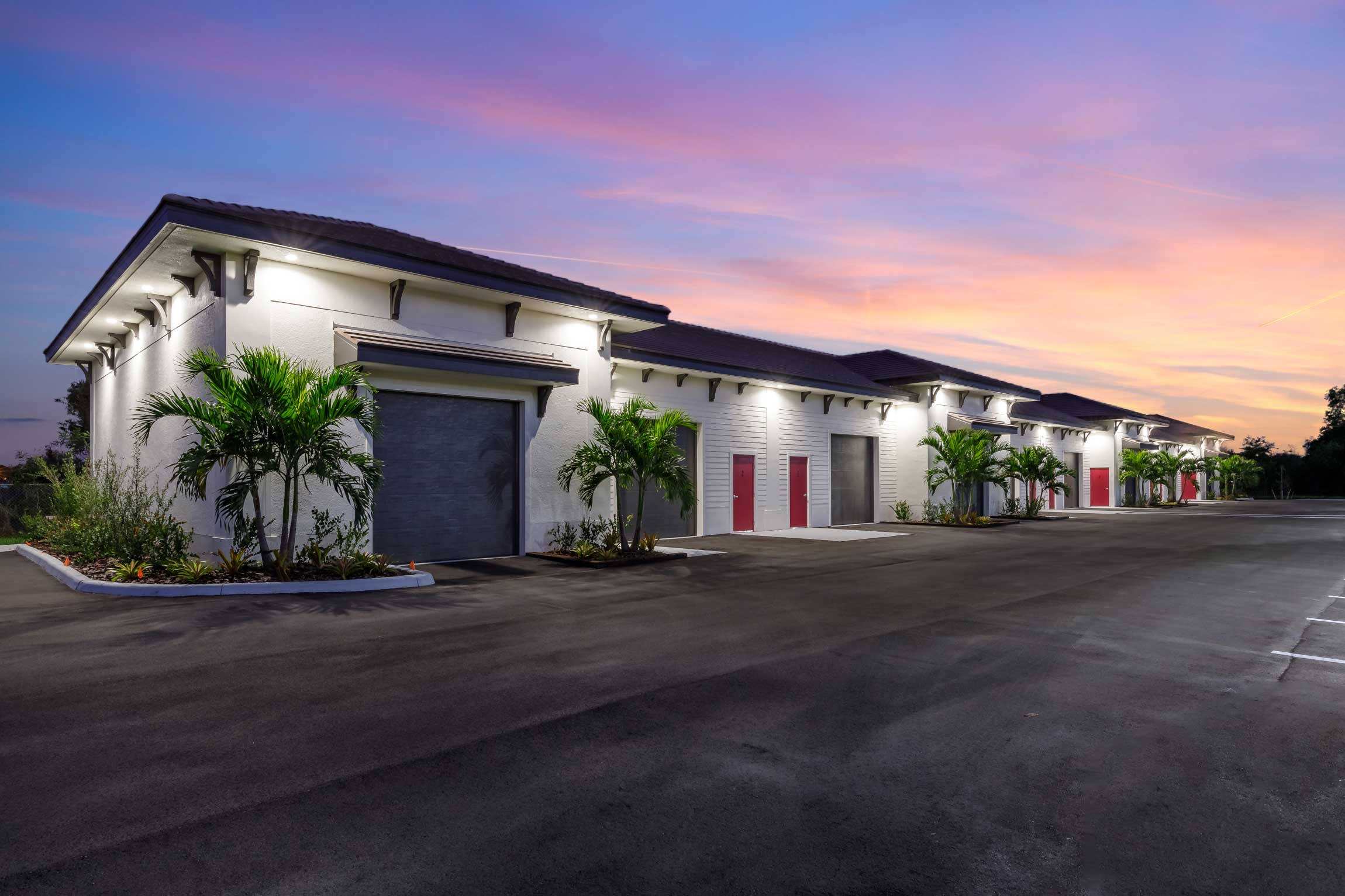
Built by Stalwart Construction

John Moffatt (born June 19, 1964) was an American Television Producer now famed as a World Record Holder for distance traveled on a personal water craft (PWC).

He was born in Evanston, Illinois. He was an Associate Producer of Full House on ABC from 1994 to 1995. He set the world record for distance traveled on a personal water craft in the summer of 2000 on a 12' Yamaha after traveling 5,604 miles in 80 days, completing the American Great Circle Route. The trip was to raise awareness of Crohn's disease, a disease from which his sister suffers.

The record was later broken by teams from Australia and South Africa. Moffatt successfully set another distance World Record on a PWC in 2007. The trip cost approximately $45,000 and was financed by Moffatt with the help of his sponsors, Torco Racing Fuels and Sea-Doo He left Miami on June 8, 2007, and returned to Miami after travelling 11,525 miles on October 18, 2007, and set a new world record.

In 2009 Mr. Moffatt co-created Sun Coast Global Realty (a Real Estate Brokerage). Moffatt and his team purchased over 100 foreclosed homes at the Lee County Foreclosure Auction and rehabilitated the properties and sold them through his brokerage.

In 2020 Mr. Moffatt co-created Stalwart Construction, LLC which builds commercial buildings in Cape Coral, Florida. Moffatt and his two partners specialize in building and owning Commercial Flex buildings that help service small to medium sized businesses in Cape Coral and Lee County.
