= Hugh Moffatt (footballer) =

Australian rules footballer

Personal information
- Full name: Hugh Moffatt
- Born: 19 February 1894
- Died: 19 August 1961 (aged 67)
- Height: 185 cm (6 ft 1 in)
- Weight: 95 kg (209 lb)

Playing career^{1}
Years	Club	Games (Goals)
1921–22	Richmond	9 (2)
- ^{1} Playing statistics correct to the end of 1922.

Hugh Moffatt (19 February 1894 – 19 August 1961) was a former Australian rules footballer who played with Richmond in the Victorian Football League (VFL).
