= George Moffat =

George Moffat or Moffatt may refer to:

- George Moffatt (1787–1865), businessman and political figure in Lower Canada and Canada East
- George Moffatt (English politician) (1806–1878), British Member of Parliament for Dartmouth, Ashburton Honiton and Southampton
- George Moffat Sr. (1810–1878), New Brunswick businessman and Conservative politician
- George Moffat Jr. (1848–1918), son of the above, also a New Brunswick businessman and Conservative politician
- George B. Moffat Jr. (1927–2024), American author and world champion sailplane pilot
