= John Moffatt =

John Moffatt may refer to:

- John Moffatt (actor) (1922–2012), English actor
- John Moffatt (physicist) (1922–2013), British physicist and academic
- John Moffatt (producer) (born 1964), American television producer, also known for his world record on a personal water craft

== See also ==
- John Moffat (disambiguation)
- John Moffet (disambiguation)
