= Siue Moffat =

Canadian activist

Siue Moffat is a Canadian vegan chocolatier, cookbook author, filmmaker, zine maker, video activist and film archivist. She began writing zines in the late 1980s. Her two-page zine, "Roy Spim", was cited as life changing, blunt, and fearless by an author of a reflection at Broken Pencil.

Moffat collaborated with musician and multimedia artist Jonathan Culp on a collective video and zine distribution initiative in the late 1990s. She was very involved in the punk community (DIY ethic) doing volunteer administrative work on the "Book Your Own Fucking Life" site (a free online resource for independent artists and promoters, once a hard copy zine published by Maximumrocknroll), and wrote columns about archiving media in the deceased magazine HeartattaCk.

Moffat's career as an author also includes two editions of vegan dessert cookbooks called Lickin' the Beaters. Including 77 recipes, the book was illustrated and designed similarly to Moffat's zines. The second edition (released during National Chocolate Week, 2010) was described as "fun" in a guide to vegan cuisine. In an interview that reflects on the author's career and interest in punk culture, Moffat described the book as organized around the theme of "good and evil."

In 2008, she founded Boardwalk Chocolates, a fully vegan chocolatier.

== Publications ==
- Moffat, Siue (1996). Marcie's Book of Vegan Recipes for Non Picky People.
- Moffat, Siue (1996). The Michael Ellis Chronicles #2.
- Moffat, Siue (1996). Punk Rock Film Guide.
- Moffat, Siue (1998). Marcie's Book of Vegan Recipes for Non Picky People #2.
- Culp, Jonathan; Moffat, Siue (2001). The Day I Came Home as a Punk. Satan MacNuggit.
- Moffat, Siue (2001). Sick Punks. Mr. Prither Cycling Tour Concoctions.
- Moffat, Siue (2003). Gross Food.
- Moffat, Siue (2003). Lickin' the Beaters: Low Fat Vegan Desserts. Mr. Pither Cycling Tour Concoctions. ISBN 978-0-973-18090-9.
- Moffat, Siue (2003). Punk is Like a Box of Candy.
- Moffat, Siue (2010). Lickin' the Beaters 2: Vegan Chocolate and Candy. PM Press. ISBN 978-0-9731809-1-6.
- Moffat, Siue (2011). The Day I Stopped Being Punk. Illustrated by Antoine. Pumpkin Pie Press.
- Antoine; Moffat, Siue (2012). Fascinating Folks. Pumpkin Pie Press.
- Moffat, Siue (2024). Sonic Bonds: A Journey Into Wondrous Radio. Mr. Pither Cycling Tour Concoctions. ISBN 978-0-973-18093-0.

== Filmography ==
- Sax Duck (2024)
- Rotchester (2017)
- Niagara.Falls (2017)
- Totally Kid Carousel (2006/2009)
- The End of The Year (Directed by Ben Kukkee, 2005. Sound recordist and sound editor)
- Grilled Cheese Sandwich (Directed by Jonathan Culp, 2005. Sound recordist, stills, etc.)
- Train to New York (2003)
- Become the Media (2003)
- P-Grrrl (2002)
- Patti Helps Out (2002)
- Various films with the Toronto Video Activist Collective (1998–2003)

== Other ==
- Book indexer for AK Press, Between the Lines, etc. (present)
- Vegan chocolatier/owner Boardwalk Chocolates (2008–2012)
- Presenter and Panelist on "Archiving the Action" at the 2005 Association of Moving Image Archivists Conference in Austin TX
- Guest on CBC's Here And Now 28/8/03 for Lickin' the Beaters with Jonathan Culp.
- Print Trafficker for the True/False documentary film festival in Columbia, Missouri (2005–2007)
- Microcosm Publishing worker (2005–2006)
- Volunteer on Oregon Historical Society's film collection (2005–2007)
- Distribution coordinator in Satan Macnuggit Popular Arts/Unpopular Arts, an activist/DIY film producer and distributor (1999–2003)
