= Charles White (cricketer) =

English cricketer

Charles White (c. 1823 – 18 February 1873) was an English cricketer who played for Surrey. He was born and died in Southwark.

White made a single first-class appearance, in 1850, against Middlesex. Batting in the tailend, he scored a duck in his only innings.
