= Arnold Moffitt =

Australian rules footballer

Personal information
- Full name: Arnold Hastie Moffitt
- Born: 12 December 1883
- Died: 19 July 1963 (aged 79)
- Original team: Hastings

Playing career^{1}
Years	Club	Games (Goals)
1904	St Kilda	3 (0)
- ^{1} Playing statistics correct to the end of 1904.

Arnold Hastie Moffitt (12 December 1883 – 19 July 1963) was an Australian rules footballer who played for the St Kilda Football Club in the Victorian Football League (VFL).

He was incorrectly identified as Alec pr Alexander Moffatt for many years.
