= Chartered Mathematician =

UK professional qualification

Chartered Mathematician (CMath) is a professional qualification in mathematics awarded to professional practising mathematicians by the Institute of Mathematics and its Applications (IMA) in the United Kingdom.

Chartered Mathematician is the IMA's highest professional qualification; achieving it is done through a rigorous peer-reviewed process.

The required standard for Chartered Mathematician registration is typically an accredited UK MMath degree, at least five years of peer-reviewed professional practise of advanced Mathematics, attainment of a senior-level of technical standing, and an ongoing commitment to Continuing Professional Development.

A Chartered Mathematician is entitled to use the post-nominal letters CMath, in accordance with the Royal Charter granted to the IMA by the Privy Council. The profession of Chartered Mathematician is a 'regulated profession' under the European professional qualification directives.

== See also ==
- Institute of Mathematics and its Applications
