= John Marks Moffatt =

English antiquarian (died 1802)

- Died: 25 December 1802; Malmesbury, Wiltshire
- Occupation: Antiquarian

John Marks Moffatt (died 25 December 1802) was an English antiquarian.

== Biography ==
Moffatt was minister of a congregation of Protestant dissenters at the Forest Green, Avening, Gloucestershire, at Nailsworth in the same county, and lastly at Malmesbury, Wiltshire. He died at Malmesbury on 25 Dec. 1802 (Gent. Mag. 1803, pt. i. p. 193), leaving a widow and seven children. His writings are: 1. 'The Duty and Interest of every private Person and the Kingdom at large at the present juncture,' 8vo, 1778. 2. 'The Protestant's Prayer-Book ... to which are added Hymns,' &c., 8vo, Bristol, 1783. 3. 'The History of the Town of Malmesbury and of its ancient Abbey,' 8vo, Tetbury, 1805, published posthumously for the benefit of the author's family.
