= Henry Moffat =

American football player and physician (1855–1926)

- Born: December 20, 1855
- Died: March 25, 1926 (aged 70); Yonkers, New York, U.S.
- Occupation: Physician
- Football career
- Class: 1875

Career information
- College: Princeton (1872–1874)

Henry Moffat (December 20, 1855 – March 25, 1926) was a medical doctor in Yonkers, New York. Mark Twain was one of his clients. He caused the building of a tuberculosis hospital. He was a member of a draft board during World War I.

Moffat also attended Princeton University, where he was a prominent football player. He kicked off the first Princeton–Yale game in 1873. He was also a golfer; a member of the "Apple Tree Gang" and St. Andrew's golf club.
