= Charles Powell White =

English pathologist and writer (1867-1930)

- Born: 21 April 1867
- Died: 26 September 1930 (aged 63)
- Occupations: Pathologist, writer

Charles Powell White (21 April 1867 – 26 September 1930) F.R.C.S. was an English pathologist and cancer researcher.

== Biography ==
White was born on 21 April 1867. He was the fourth son of Reverend Lewis Borrett White, D.D. He was educated at St Paul's School and obtained first-class honours at the University of London, in 1884. He gained a scholarship at Sidney Sussex College in 1886 and graduated BA. He was house surgeon at St Bartholomew's Hospital and during 1894–1895 obtained the Treasurer's research scholarship in pathology. He became pathologist at Birmingham General Hospital in 1898 and was elected demonstrator of pathology at Yorkshire College, in 1900. White was appointed demonstrator of morbid anatomy and pathology at St Thomas' Hospital in 1902 and became demonstrator of pathology in 1904 and assistant pathologist in the Medical School in 1905.

White obtained L.R.C.P. in 1894 and F.R.C.S. in 1896. He was treasurer of the Pathological Society of Great Britain. He moved to Manchester in 1906 and was appointed pathologist to the Christie Hospital for Cancer in 1910 and special lecturer in pathology at Manchester University in 1915. He was director of the Helen Swindell Cancer Research Laboratory at the University of Manchester and histologist to the Manchester Committee on Cancer.

White authored Lectures on the Pathology of Cancer, in 1908. It was positively reviewed in the Nature journal and recommended "to all who wish to be brought up to date in the biology of cancer". His book, The Pathology of Growth Tumours was well received by a reviewer in The Lancet journal who commented that it gave an "admirably clear and concise account of our knowledge of the different varieties of tumours, their structure, and their mode of growth".

White married Lettice Mary in 1918. They had a son and daughter.

== Death ==
White suffered a severe cerebral haemorrhage. He died on 26 September 1930 after being paralysed and bedridden for two years.

== Selected publications ==
- Lectures on the Pathology of Cancer (1908)
- The Pathology of Growth Tumours (1913)
- The Principles of Pathology (1927)
