= Anthony Moffat =

Canadian astronomer

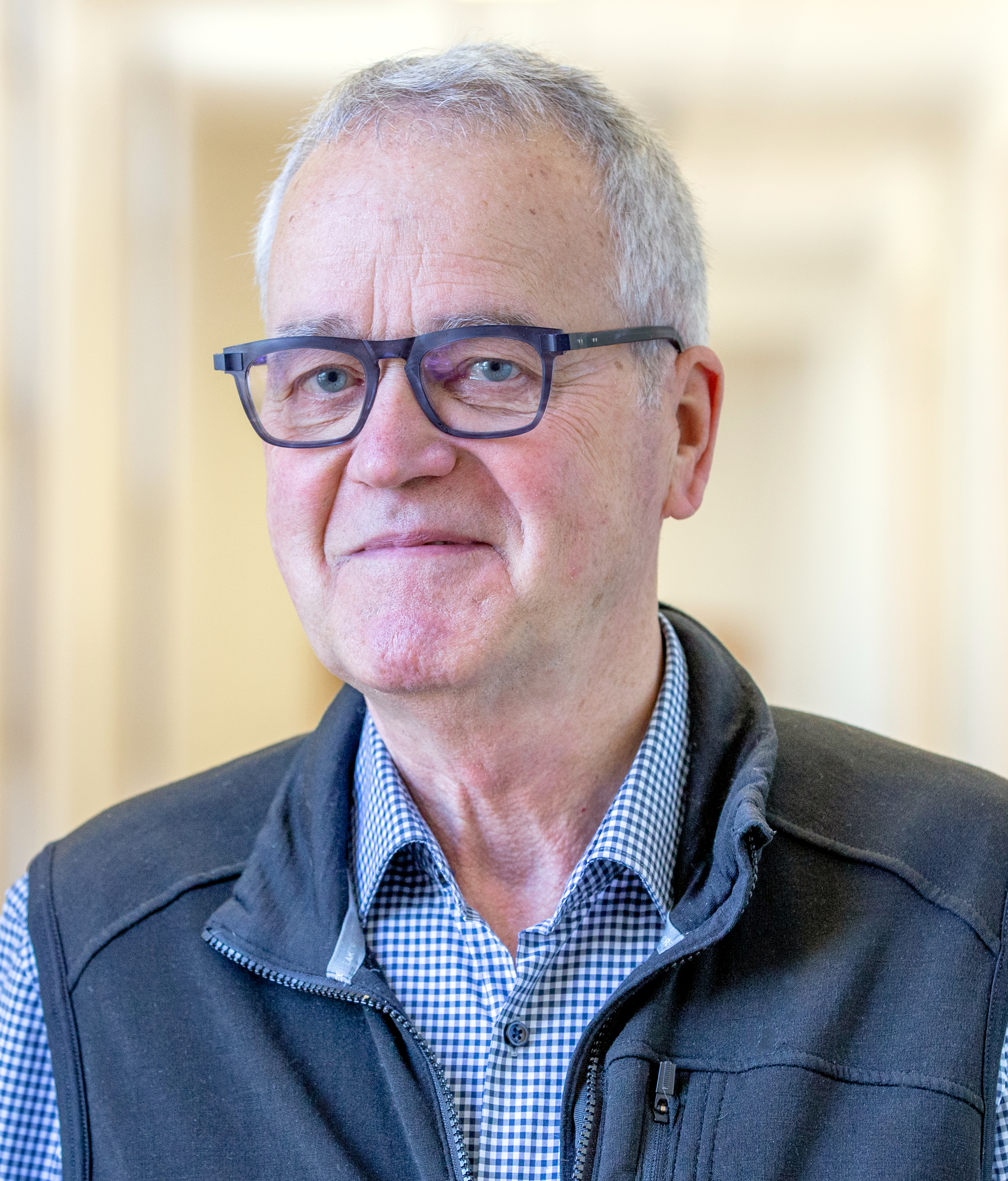
- Anthony Moffat, astronomer and emeritus professor of astronomy at the University of Montreal
- Education: University of Toronto; University of Bonn; Ruhr-Universität Bochum
- Scientific career
- Fields: Astrophysics
- Workplaces: Université de Montréal
- Thesis: Comparison of twelve open star clusters using photographic UBV photometry (1970)

Anthony (Tony) F.J. Moffat is an emeritus professor of astronomy at the Université de Montréal in Montreal, Quebec, Canada. He was appointed as a fellow of the Royal Society of Canada in 2001. Moffat's research focuses on massive stars (Wolf-Rayet stars in particular), stellar winds, binary stars, as well as the structure and dynamics of star formation regions and galaxies.

== Education ==
Moffat completed his Master of Science at the University of Toronto in 1966. His doctorate was granted in 1970 from University of Bonn (Dr. rer. nat.). He then completed postdoctoral studies at Ruhr-Universität Bochum from 1970 to 1976, and was awarded of his second Dr. Habil. In 1976.

In 1969 he published a paper describing the Moffat distribution, which combines the spread in stellar light due to astronomical seeing and diffraction by the telescope and used to accurately reconstruct point spread functions of images of stars. While originally developed for images taken with photographic plates, these profiles are still widely used in astronomy today.

In a series of papers beginning with a study of the open star cluster NGC 7380 and eleven other clusters, Moffat used photographic UBV photometry to identify massive star populations.

== Career ==
Moffat was hired to the faculty of Université de Montréal in 1976. He retired, becoming an emeritus professor, in 2008.

During his time at the Université de Montréal, he supervised 8 postdoctoral scientists and 14 doctoral students. This includes Alexandre David-Uraz's research into dust formation around Wolf-Rayet stars.

== Honours and awards ==
- 1965 - Silver Medal in physics & mathematics, Victoria College University of Toronto
- 1965 - Gold Medal, Royal Astronomical Society of Canada
- 1998, 2000 - Killam Research Fellowship, Canada Council for the Arts
- 2001 - Fellow of the Royal Society of Canada
- 2022 - Carlyle S. Beals Award for Outstanding Research from the Canadian Astronomical Society.
