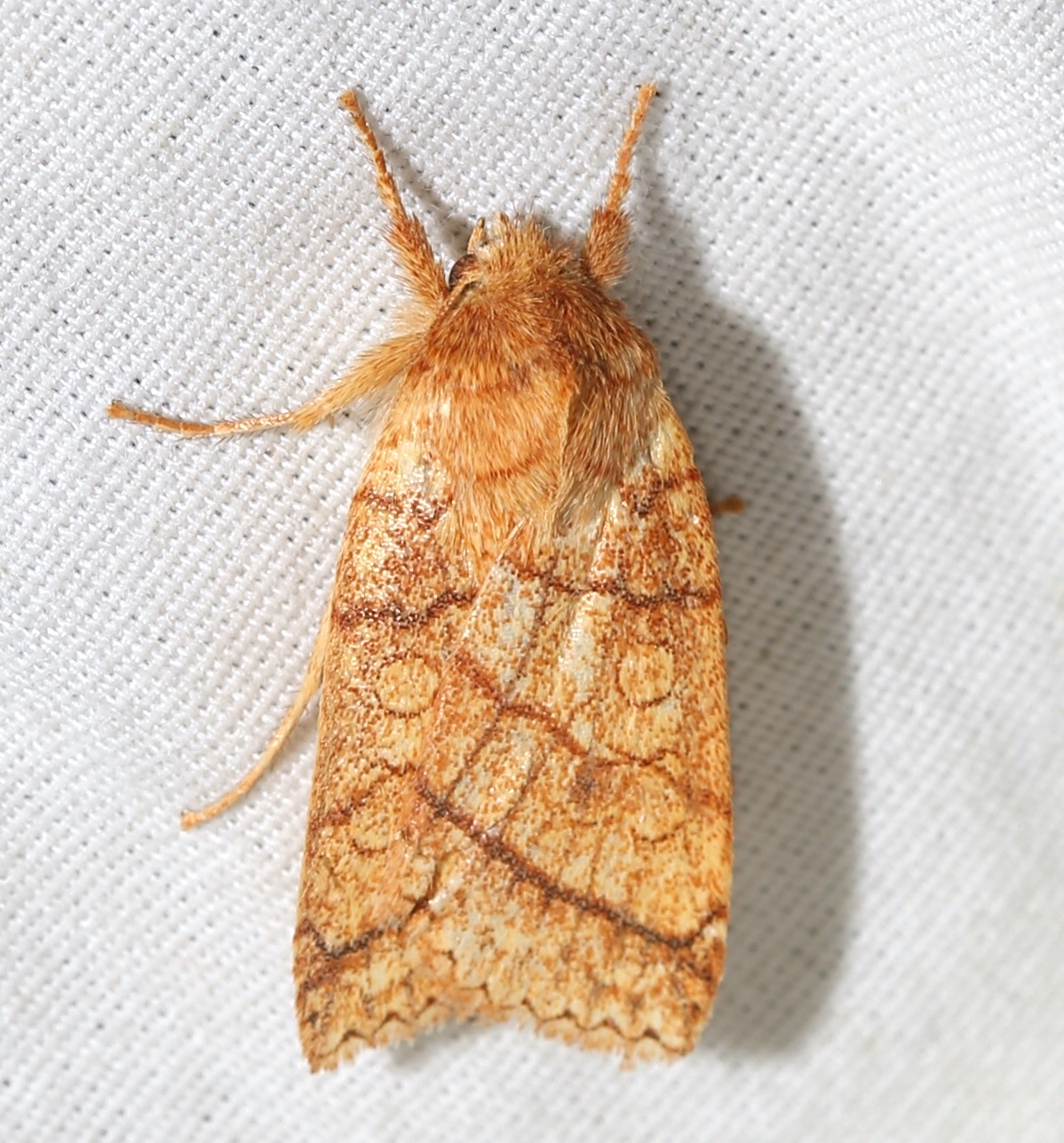

Scientific classification
- Kingdom: Animalia
- Phylum: Arthropoda
- Class: Insecta
- Order: Lepidoptera
- Superfamily: Noctuoidea
- Family: Noctuidae
- Tribe: Xylenini
- Subtribe: Xylenina
- Genus: Pyreferra
- Species: P. hesperidago

Binomial name
- Pyreferra hesperidago (Guenee, 1852)

= Pyreferra hesperidago =

Species of moth

Pyreferra hesperidago, the mustard sallow, is a species of cutworm or dart moth in the family Noctuidae. It is found in North America.

The MONA or Hodges number for Pyreferra hesperidago is 9929.
