= Jonathan Culp =

Canadian media creator

Jonathan Culp (born March 22, 1971) is a Canadian underground filmmaker, musician, media artist and writer. They are best known for the features Grilled Cheese Sandwich and Taking Shelter, and for their work in the genre of found footage collage.

== History ==
=== Early life ===
Culp was raised on a farm in Vineland Station, Ontario. Their grandparents (who ran a film distribution company, Carman Educational Associates) worked with and boarded German animation pioneer Lotte Reiniger, whom Culp met at age 3, their first exposure to filmmaking.

Culp received a degree in Radio and Television Arts at Ryerson University. Between semesters they wrote and directed their first short 16mm drama, Bark, featuring friend and former bandmate Ailsa Craig.

=== Performance art, TVAC and early short videos ===
While employed as a post-production supervisor at Vision TV, Culp became involved with Symptom Hall, a free-form performance arts space that operated from 1993 to 1998. There they would perform and otherwise contribute to several ambitious ‘happenings’. Culp would produce an audio documentary on Symptom Hall in 2016.

In 1996 Culp premiered a 16mm experimental short film, Jonathan Culp!, at The Cameron House, Toronto, during a CD release party for their punk band Loogan Bin.

Culp formed the Toronto Video Activist Collective (TVAC) with a number of other leftist videographers in 1997. TVAC documented street protests for several years and produced the VideoActive compilation video series on VHS. The Ontario Coalition Against Poverty’s direct action protests became the subject of several short documentaries by Culp between 1999 and 2005.

In 1998, while hitch-hiking across Canada, Culp attended Victoria’s Antimatter Festival to premiere Chew It, Somalia! - a found-footage collage film made from 16mm films bought at a library sale. Culp went on to work predominantly in the collage style, authoring many films and videos most notably the feature-length Taking Shelter.

=== Longer films and recent work ===
==== Grilled Cheese Sandwich (2005) ====
Culp’s first feature was shot on video in 2003 with a budget of $12,000. Largely cast with local teens, it satirized Culp’s experiences in the social justice movement, within an unflattering portrait of fictionalized small town Grimsville, ON.

==== It Can Happen Here (2006) ====
A 47 minute ‘anti-documentary’ essay on the themes of art, activism and madness. The project grew out of an exploration of the Weyburn Mental Hospital, where Culp's great-grandfather Russell Carman had been incarcerated from 1936 to 1962.

==== Taking Shelter (2014) ====
An ambitious feature-length collage project, seven years in the making. Culp crafts a new narrative from clips of over 400 Canadian feature films produced between 1970 and 1989.

==== Other film and video work ====
In between and following these major projects, Culp continued to direct and edit many collage shorts, Super 8 films, and music videos, while expanding into multiscreen presentations and film installation. The 2018 films I Regret (created at Phil Hoffman’s Film Farm) and Monday -> Friday (their first film installation) both address themes of post-traumatic stress and anxiety.

=== Music ===
Alongside film and video work, Culp has contributed songwriting, vocals and guitar to rock bands The Suck Trumpets, Loogan Bin, The Biters and Broken Puppy.

They have also played guitar in Toronto ensembles Tomboyfriend and Opera Arcana (featuring Fifth Column’s G. B. Jones.)

Culp cowrote (with Bob Wiseman and Chris Mills) the original songs for their feature Grilled Cheese Sandwich.

=== Exhibition ===
With Siue Moffat, Culp launched Satan Macnuggit Popular Arts in 1999, producing and distributing VHS videos and zines for sale at zine fairs and screening events.

The Satan Macnuggit Video Road Show hosted over 70 screenings during its 2001 and 2003 cross-country tours, featuring zero-budget activist and art videos from such contributors as Meesoo Lee, Amy Lockhart, Mare Sheppard and the Direct Action Media Network. Today Culp’s production company is Unpopular Arts.

Culp’s films have been screened at Images, Inside/Out, the Chicago Anarchist Film Festival, True/False, Kurzfilmtage Oberhausen, Perth International, In The Soil and the Montreal Underground Film Festival.

From 2007 to 2018 Culp acted as co-programmer at Toronto’s underground screening venue Trash Palace, where they contributed prints from their large collection of 16mm Canadian and educational films. In late 2018 they donated much of their multimedia archive and papers to The Media Commons at the University of Toronto.

=== Writing ===
Culp is a long-time contributor to the Toronto zine community, authoring the multi-issue The Stupid Journey and Cinertia zines and contributing writing and comic art to Fuzzy Heads are Better and The Day I Woke Up Punk.

Culp was film and video editor for Broken Pencil magazine from 1999 to 2001, and has authored several reviews and essays for Paul Corupe’s canuxploitation.com. They have written reviews and features for many web sites and publications including The Cultural Gutter, Fuse, POV, Eclectic Screening Room, Clamor, Canadian Dimension, Filmprint and Now Magazine.

They contributed the interview-based essay “Farther Shores: Experiments in Feature Narrative“ to the anthology Explosions In the Movie Machine.

== Longer films and videos ==
- Taking Shelter (2014)
- It Can Happen Here (2006)
- Grilled Cheese Sandwich (2005)

== Selected short films and videos ==
- I Regret (2018)
- A New Place To Dwell (2015)
- Hot Divorcee (2011)
- Reproduction Prohibited (2009, with Monica Pearce)
- Red Shift (2009)
- Eventually (2005)
- Death Mask (2004)
- How Does It Work? (2001)
- Chew It, Somalia! (1998)
- The Boob (1998)
- Jonathan Culp! (1996)
- Bark (1995)

== Recordings ==
- Symptom Hall (Unpopular Arts, 2016)
- Broken Puppy: Intro Version (Unpopular Arts, 2016)
- Loogan Bin: General Strike (Satan Macnuggit cassette single,1998)
- Loogan Bin: Scene Wrecker (Satan Macnuggit, 1996)
