= Edna Virginia Moffett =

American college professor

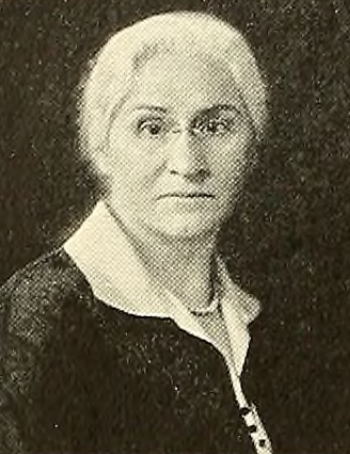
- Moffett, from the 1929 yearbook of Wellesley College
- Born: January 28, 1870; Richmond, Virginia, U.S.
- Died: March 1, 1962 (age 92); Cambridge, Massachusetts, U.S.
- Occupation(s): Historian, college professor

Edna Virginia Moffett (January 28, 1870 – March 1, 1962) was an American historian of medieval Europe, and a history professor at Wellesley College from 1902 to 1938.

== Early life and education ==
Moffett was born in Richmond, Virginia, the daughter of John Guthrie Moffett and Virginia Ellen Austin Moffett. Her father, a Confederate States Army veteran of the American Civil War, died in 1884. She graduated from Vassar College in 1897, with Lucy Maynard Salmon as her mentor. She earned a master's degree in 1901, and a Ph.D. in 1907, both from Cornell University, where she held a President White Fellowship. Her master's thesis was titled "François Baudouin, an early advocate of tolerance." She pursued further studies in France and Germany, at the University of Besancon in 1905 and 1906, and at the University of Heidelberg from 1912 to 1913.

== Career ==
Moffett taught at Virginia Normal College from 1897 to 1900. She was a history professor at Wellesley College from 1902 until she retired with emerita status in 1938. She created a new course in medieval history, and chaired the history department at Wellesley. She took summer research trips to England, Spain, and France during her career. She contributed articles to the Dictionary of American Biography, and was director of the Virginia chapter of Association of Collegiate Alumnae.

Moffett moved back to Richmond when she retired. She spoke at a Kappa Delta Pi banquet in 1939. In 1941, she taught an adult study course in church history at a Presbyterian church in Richmond. In 1948, Wellesley College began an institute on medieval history, and honored Moffett at the launch of the program.

== Publications ==
- A Grant of Spanish Mining Rights in 1521 (1927)
- A Lost Diploma of Otto III (1931)
- "The Diary of a Private on the First Expedition to Crown Point" (1932)
- "A Bulla of Otto III in America" (1934)
- "Wellesley North and South" (1948)

== Personal life and legacy ==
Moffett was under a conservatorship for several years before she died in 1962, at Mt. Auburn Hospital in Cambridge, Massachusetts, at the age of 92. Wellesley's Edna V. Moffett Fellowship supports graduate students in history.
