= Moffat distribution =

The Moffat distribution, named after the physicist Anthony Moffat, is a continuous probability distribution based upon the Lorentzian distribution. Its particular importance in astrophysics is due to its ability to accurately reconstruct point spread functions, whose wings cannot be accurately portrayed by either a Gaussian or Lorentzian function.

== Characterisation ==
=== Probability density function ===
The Moffat distribution can be described in two ways. Firstly as the distribution of a bivariate random variable (x,y) centred at zero, and secondly as the distribution of the corresponding radii
$$r=\sqrt{x^2+y^2}.$$
In terms of the random vector (x,y), the distribution has the probability density function (pdf)
$$f(x,y; \alpha,\beta) = \frac{\beta-1}{\pi\alpha^2} \left[1+\left(\frac{x^2+y^2}{\alpha^2}\right)\right]^{-\beta} ,$$
where $\alpha$ and $\beta$ are seeing dependent parameters. In this form, the distribution is a reparameterisation of a bivariate Student distribution with zero correlation.

In terms of the radius r, the distribution has density
$$f(r; \alpha,\beta)=\frac{\beta-1}{\pi\alpha^2} \left[1+\left(\frac{r^2}{\alpha^2}\right)\right]^{-\beta} .$$

== Relation to other distributions ==
- Pearson distribution
- Student's t-distribution for $\beta = \frac{\alpha^2+1}{2}$
- Normal distribution for $\beta = \frac{\alpha^2}{2} \rightarrow \infty$, since for the exponential function $\exp x = \lim_{n \to \infty} \left(1 + \frac{x}{n}\right)^n.$
