= Moffitt =

Moffit or Moffitt may refer to:

== Geography ==
- Moffit, North Dakota
- Mount Moffit, Alaska

== People ==
- Athol Moffitt (1914–2007), an eminent Australian jurist
- Bill Moffit (1926–2008), American composer
- Billie Jean Moffitt, birth name of American tennis player, Billie Jean King
- Brett Moffitt, American stock car driver
- Donald Moffitt, science fiction writer
- Donald L. Moffitt, a Republican member of the Illinois House of Representatives
- Ernest Moffitt (1871–1899), an Australian artist
- H. Lee Moffitt, cancer survivor who founded the H. Lee Moffitt Cancer Center & Research Institute
- Hosea Moffitt (1757–1825), a U.S. Representative from New York
- Howard Moffitt, builder
- Jefferson Moffitt (1887–1954), an American screenwriter and film director
- John Moffitt (American football) (born 1986), retired offensive lineman
- John Moffitt (athlete) (born 1980), an American track and field athlete
- John H. Moffitt (1843–1926), a U.S. Representative from New York
- Ken Moffitt (1933–2016), English footballer
- Peggy Moffitt (born 1939), a fashion model
- Ralph Moffitt (1932–2003), English golfer
- Randy Moffitt (1948–2025), American baseball pitcher
- Robert Moffit, Director of the Center for Health Policy Studies at The Heritage Foundation
- Ronni Moffitt (1951–1976), an American political activist
- Rowan Moffitt, an Australian admiral
- Stephen Moffitt (1837–1904), American military officer and politician
- Terrie Moffitt, (born 1955), an American clinical psychologist
- Thad Moffitt, American racing driver
- William Moffitt (1925–1958), British quantum chemist

== Organizations ==
- H. Lee Moffitt Cancer Center & Research Institute, University of South Florida, Tampa
- Moffitt Library, University of California, Berkeley
- Moffitt Royal Commission, a royal commission to investigate the extent and activities of organised crime in the state of New South Wales, Australia

== Other uses ==
- Moffitt architecture, the eccentric vernacular architectural style of Howard Moffitt

== See also ==
- Moffat (disambiguation)
- Moffatt (disambiguation)
- Moffett (disambiguation)
