= David Moffat (disambiguation) =

David Moffat, Moffatt or Moffett may refer to:

- David Moffat (1839–1911), American financier and industrialist
- David Moffat (rugby league) (born 1971), Australian rugby league footballer who played for Ireland
- David W. Moffat (1870–1944), Chief Justice of the Utah Supreme Court
- David Moffatt (1892–1950), Australian rules footballer
- Dave Moffatt (born 1984), member of Canadian pop/rock country band The Moffatts
- David Moffett (born 1947), British-Australian-New Zealand sports administrator and politician
- David M. Moffett (born 1952), American businessman
