= Muscatine Avenue Moffitt Cottage Historic District =

Historic district in Iowa, US

- U.S. National Register of Historic Places
- U.S. Historic district
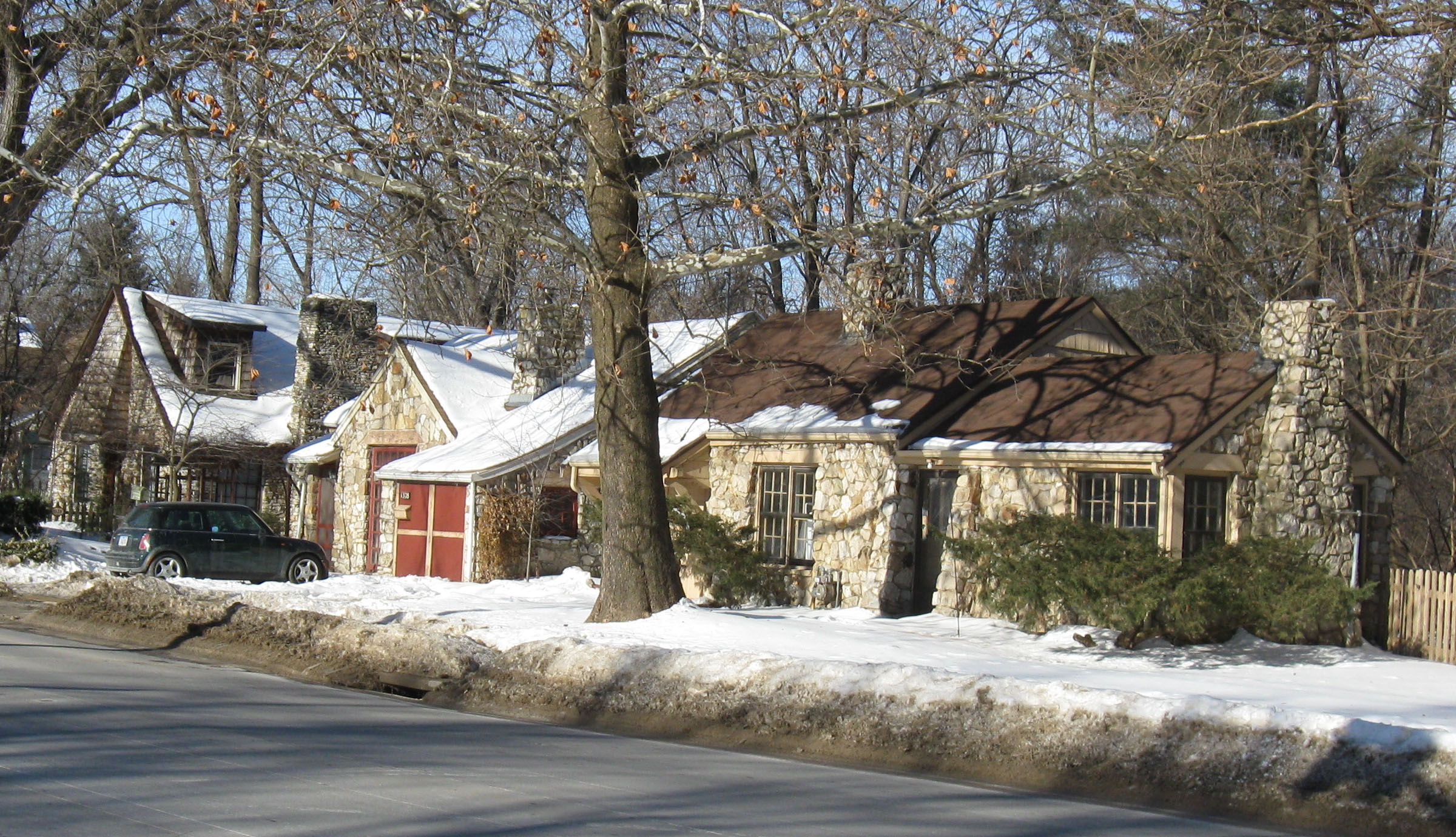
- Muscatine Avenue Moffitt Cottage Historic District in Iowa City, Iowa

- Location within Iowa Location within the United States
- Location: 1322--1330 Muscatine Ave., Iowa City, Iowa
- Coordinates: 41°39′26″N 91°30′55″W
- Built: 1939
- Architect: Moffitt, Howard Frances
- Architectural style: Late 19th And 20th Century Revivals, English CottagePeriod House
- MPS: Small Homes of Howard F. Moffitt in Iowa City and Coralville MPS
- NRHP reference No.: 93000327
- Added to NRHP: May 04, 1993

The Muscatine Avenue Moffitt Cottage Historic District is a National Register of Historic Places district that includes five stone cottages in Iowa City epitomizing the eccentric vernacular architectural style of Howard Moffitt. Moffitt constructed more than 100 houses in Iowa City and Coralville, Iowa, and a few in Citrus City, Texas. These small houses represent one of the regional 20th-century vernacular architectural styles in the United States. Howard Moffitt was a prolific builder.

== Howard Moffitt ==
Howard Francis Moffitt was a prolific builder, constructing between 100 and 200 homes in Iowa City and Coralville between 1924 and 1943. With no formal training in construction or architecture, Moffitt began building homes as a side business from his auto parts distributorship. Moffitt's house designs appear to have been concocted from magazine photos, consultation with friends, limitations of available building supplies, and whimsy. In 1943 Moffitt moved to Citrus City, Texas, and attempted to reproduce his success there, however only seven or eight houses were built in Texas. Moffitt's Iowa City houses appear to be a response to increasing demand for affordable small houses, especially rental houses, in the growing university town.

== The Moffitt house style ==
No two Moffitt houses are identical. Moffitt's building style was so eclectic that there are many homes in Iowa City in which there is no sure way to determine if Moffitt built them; his building records do not survive. "These mystical dwellings look as if Germanic elves constructed houses for Irish pixies", is how one writer described them. In general Moffitt houses borrow heavily from the English Cottage, Storybook, and American Craftsman styles of architecture, although there are examples of Moffitt building in styles reminiscent of southwestern stucco adobe and Prairie School styles. Several of his houses have concave or hipped roofs. While there is no single architectural aspect that includes all Moffitt houses, there are some common design and decoration schemes that are commonly seen in Moffitt houses. These include:

- Large tapering chimney
- Steeply-peaked roofs and dormers
- Built-in small garages (uncommon in such small houses)
- Spindle porch columns
- Copious use of recycled material (trolley track rails used as main supports; chair backs used as decoration; reused brick, stone, timber, barnboard, and nails).
- Multiple levels inside the structure
- An exterior mix of shingle, stone, brick, stucco, and wood siding, often on the same structure; brick and stone often laid in irregular or whimsical patterns; cladding is often patchwork.
- Structural problems such as bowed floors and plumbing and electrical work encased in plaster
- Use of a cellulosic insulation treated to be fireproof
- Concrete aggregates that include found stone and broken glass

== Gallery of Moffitt houses in Iowa City, Iowa ==
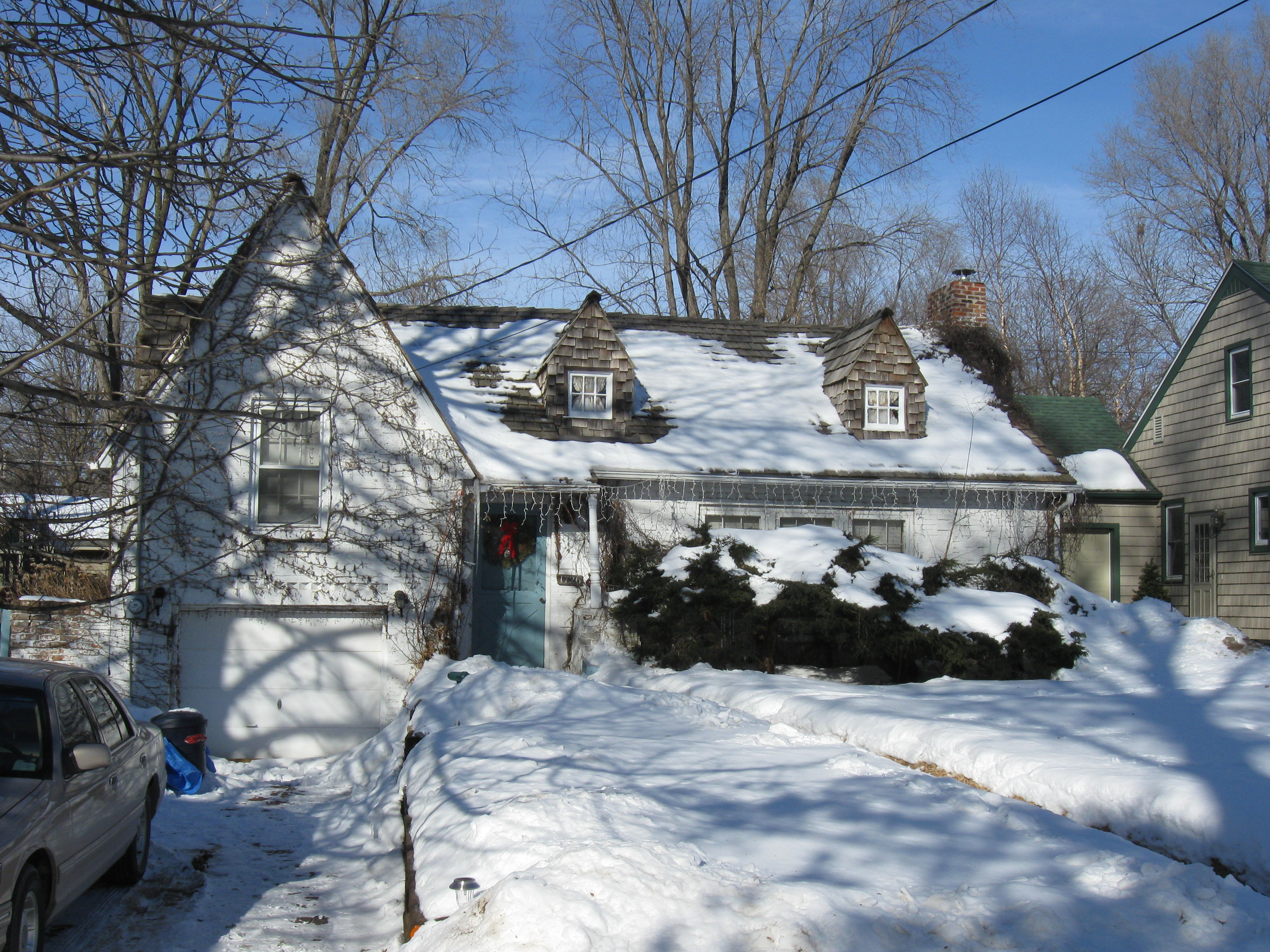
College Street: typical dormers, peaked roof, and built-in garage.

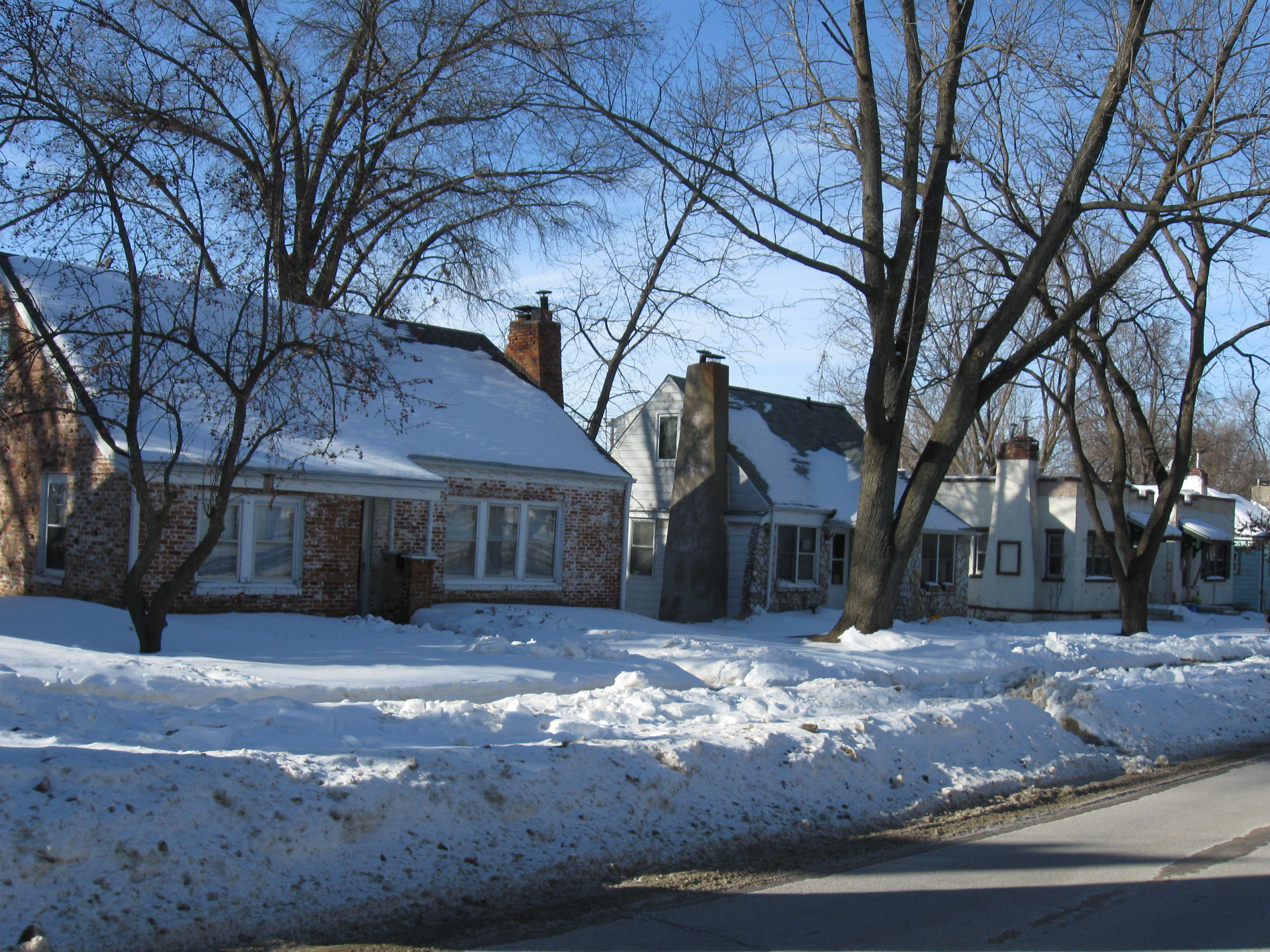
7th Avenue: the two on the left are simple Moffitts, the one on the right borrows from Southwestern adobe styles. Note tapering chimneys.

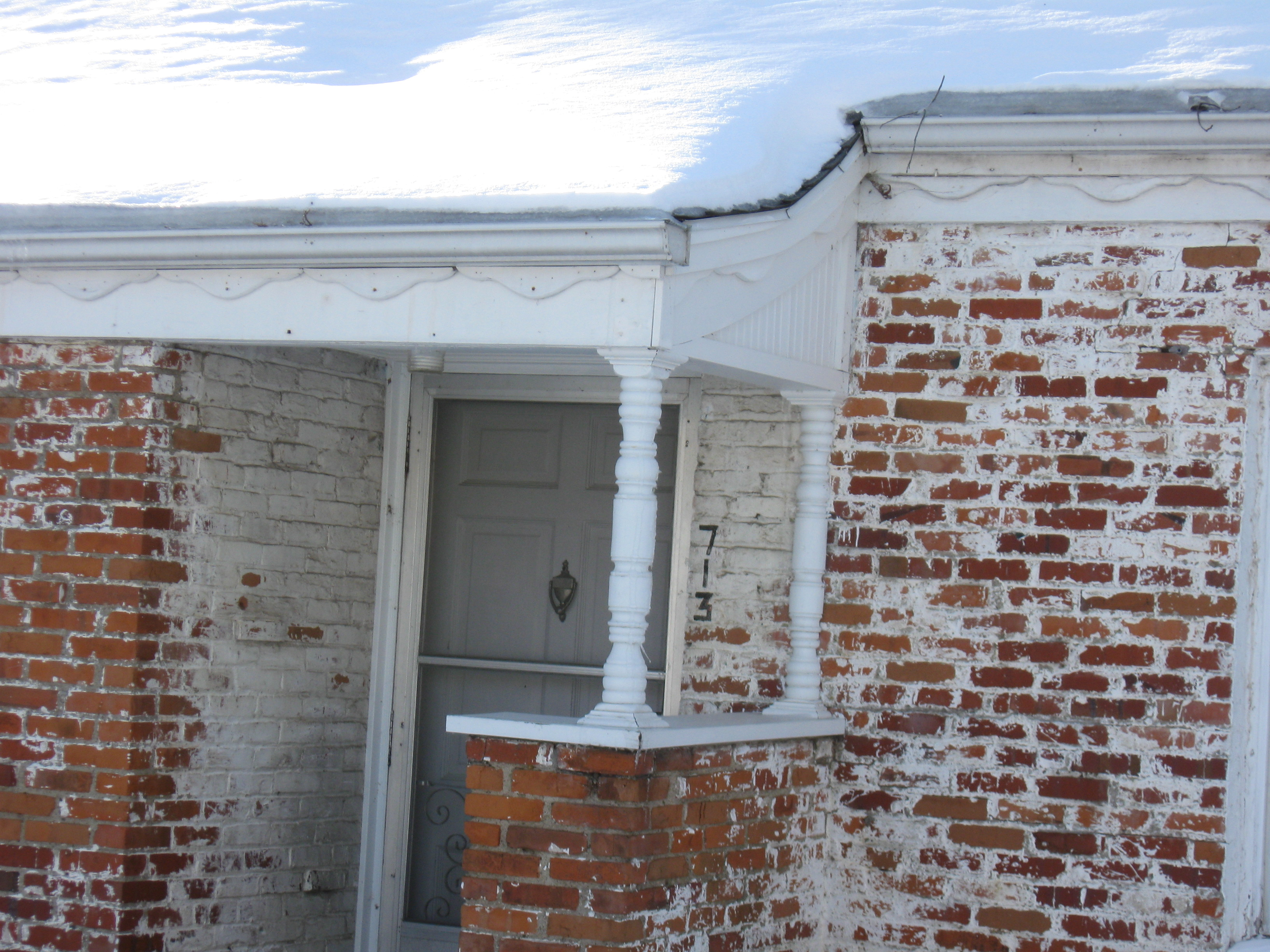
7th Avenue: example of a spindle porch column.

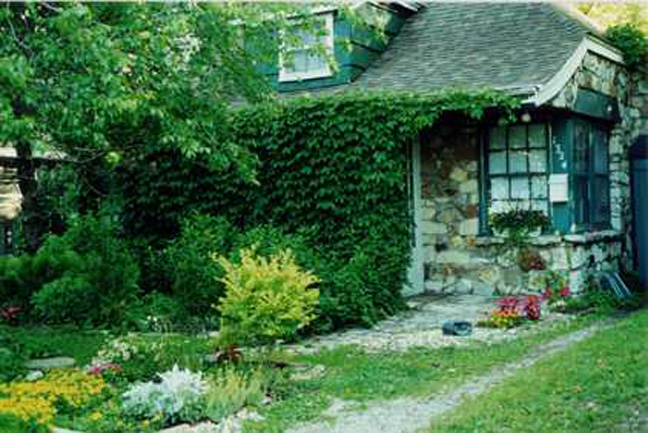
Muscatine Avenue: a Moffitt cottage in the summer of 1987.

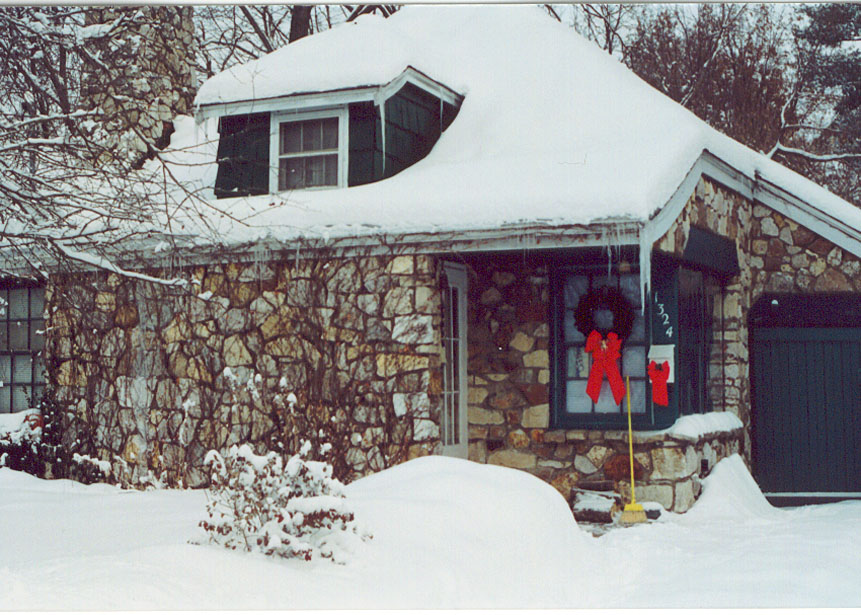
Muscatine Avenue: a Moffitt cottage in the winter of 1989/1990.
