= Jack Moffitt =

Jack Moffitt may refer to:

- Jack Moffitt (computer scientist), American computer scientist, co-author of Icecast
- Jack Moffitt (musician), Australian musician, former member of The Preatures
- Jack Moffitt (screenwriter) (1901–1969), American screenwriter and film critic
