= Mercedes-Benz Econic =

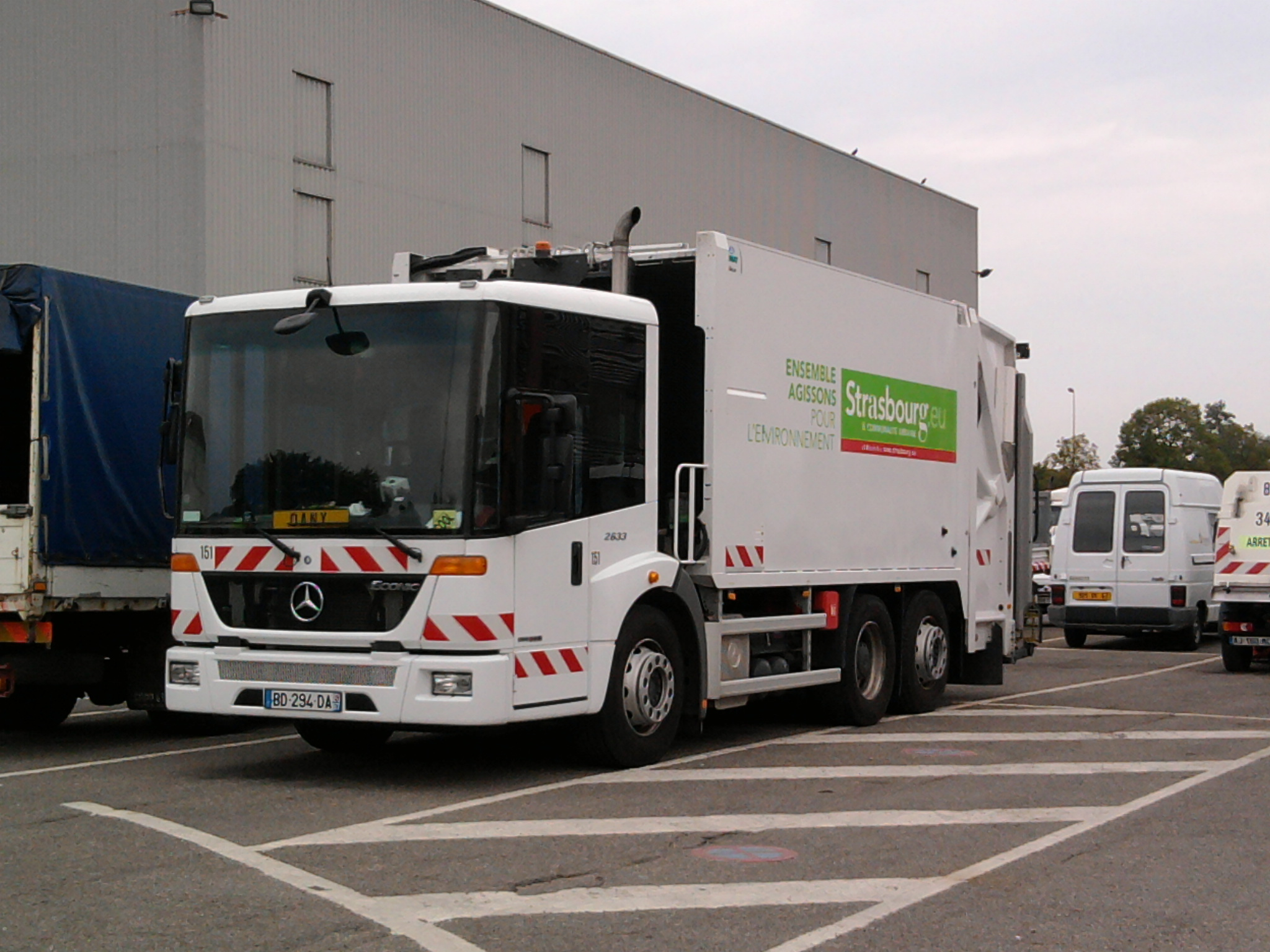
- Mercedes-Benz Econic refuse truck

Overview
- Manufacturer: Mercedes-Benz
- Also called: Freightliner EconicSD (North America)
- Production: 1998–present
- Assembly: Germany: Wörth

Body and chassis
- Class: Truck

Powertrain
- Engine: Mercedes Benz OM926, Mercedes Benz OM936

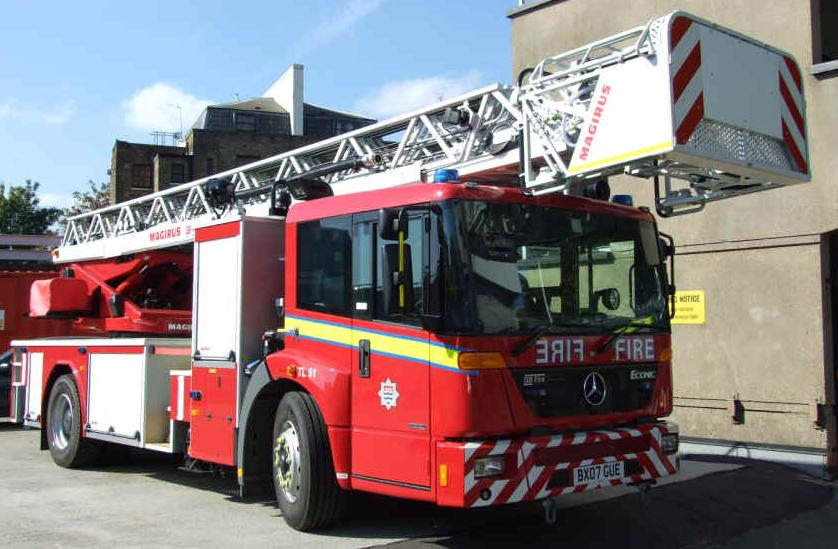
Econic aerial fire appliance

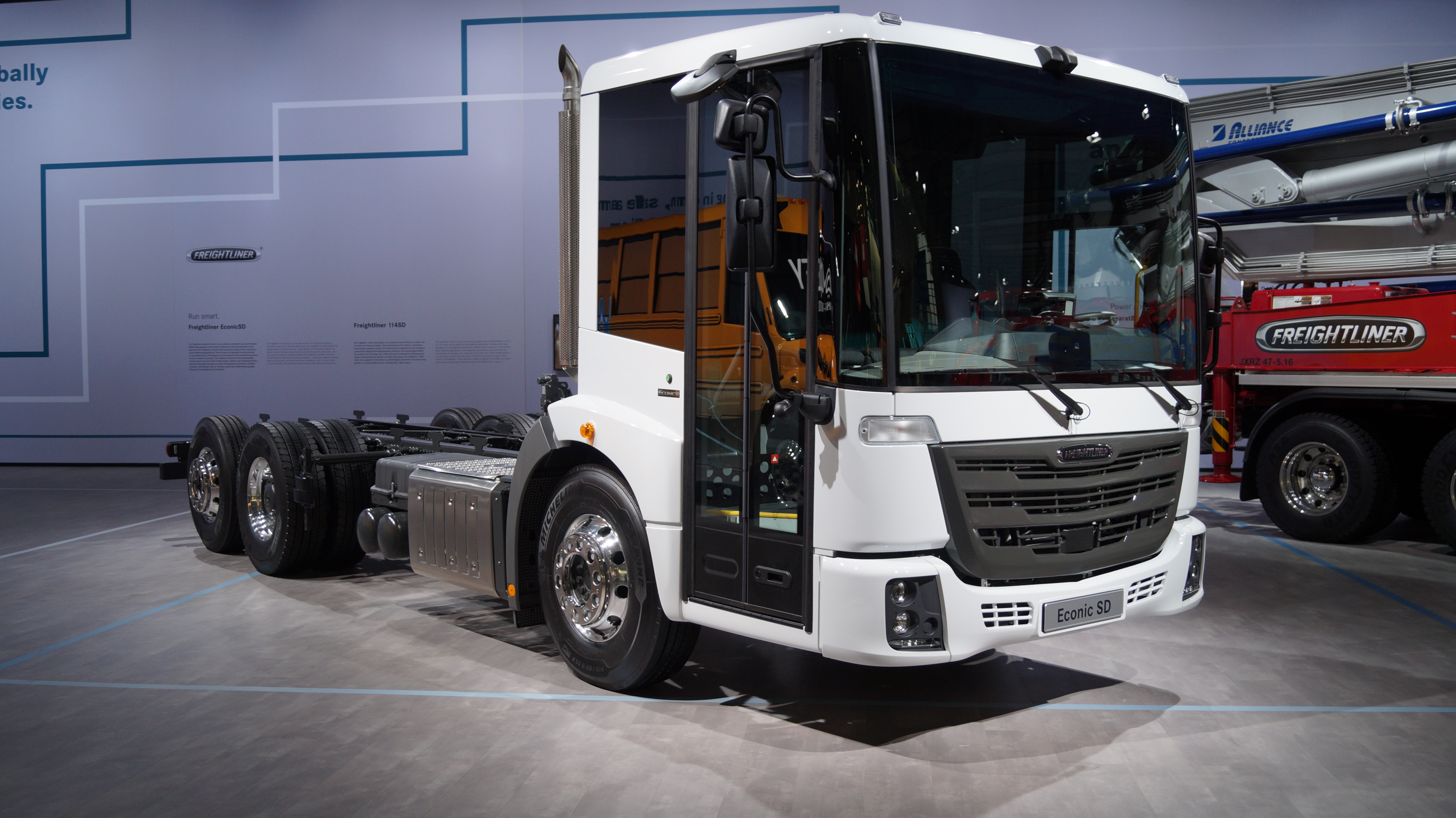
Freightliner EconicSD

The Mercedes-Benz Econic is a low-entry truck introduced by Mercedes-Benz in 1998. It is available in weights of 18 t and 26 t and is powered by a six-cylinder inline engine with turbo and intercooler. It is normally used for waste collection, fire and emergency purposes and airport ground services. In 2014, it received a facelift which included new headlamps and a revised front grille.
