= Michel Moffatt =

American politician from West Virginia

Member of the West Virginia House of Delegates
- In office 2014–2016
- Constituency: District 22

Personal details
- Party: Republican

Michel G. Moffatt is an American politician from West Virginia. He represented District 22 in the West Virginia House of Delegates from 2014 to 2016.
