= Robert Moffit =

Robert E. Moffit is the Director of the Center for Health Policy Studies at The Heritage Foundation, a conservative think tank based in Washington D.C. As a former senior official at the United States Department of Health and Human Services and the United States Office of Personnel Management, Moffit has specialized in Medicare reform, health insurance, and other federal health policy issues for nearly three decades.

== Education ==
Moffit received his bachelor's degree in political science from La Salle University in Philadelphia in 1969 and his master's and doctorate degrees from the University of Arizona in Tucson, Arizona.

== Career ==
He served as an assistant director in the United States Office of Personnel Management during the Reagan administration with responsibilities in both federal personnel policy and Congressional relations, and Deputy Assistant Secretary at the U.S. Department of Health and Human Services. Following his federal service, Moffit was a senior associate of the Capitol Resources Group International, where he assisted clients primarily in the field of federal health care policy.

After joining The Heritage Foundation in 1991, Moffit gained publicity with his draft of Heritage's analysis of President Bill Clinton's plan to nationalize the U.S. health care system. In 1993, The Washington Post ran a feature story detailing Moffit's criticisms of the Clinton proposal. Meanwhile, he called for a consumer-driven health care policy providing tax credits to help people buy health insurance of their personal choice.

Moffit's team helped develop Massachusetts' health insurance reform initiative in 2005. The Massachusetts plan developed a new system that would allow employees in small businesses to choose their health plan through a statewide "health insurance exchange." The exchange was one of the first in the country to provide a market-based approach to health care, enabling individuals to own a private and fully portable health insurance plan and take it with them from job to job.

== Views on healthcare ==
Moffit's research has also involved him in debates over Medicare reform, how to ensure access to prescription drugs, and how to improve access to private health care coverage. A longtime advocate of a consumer-driven approach, Moffit recommends that the government adopt a new program for the baby boomers entering Medicare in 2011 similar to the consumer-driven Federal Employees Health Benefit Plan (FEHBP), which allows members of Congress and federal workers to select coverage from a broad range of competing private health plans. Moffit has also been an advocate of the free market principles of consumer choice and competition since the early 1990s, when he chastised Congress for keeping such a system of choice and competition "exclusively for itself and federal workers while considering ways to impose vastly inferior systems on almost all [other] Americans."
