= John Moffet =

John Moffet may refer to:

- John Moffet (politician) (1831–1884), Democratic member-elect of the U.S. House of Representatives from Pennsylvania
- John Moffet (swimmer) (born 1964), American Olympic swimmer
- John Moffet (director), movie director and co-director of Action Man: Robot Atak

== See also ==
- John Moffat (disambiguation)
- John Moffatt (disambiguation)
