= Charles White (Dr Rock) =

Charles "Chas" White, known as Dr Rock, (born 1942) is an Irish-born BBC Radio and TV presenter and book author.

== Biography ==
White was born in Dublin. He studied medicine in London in the 1960s, to become a podiatrist, but chose instead to follow a DJ career. He lives in Scarborough.

A self-described "lifelong Rock and Roll enthusiast", he ran a college course on the development of Rock and Roll, which led to his nickname "Dr Rock" by the press. White's television work includes Dr Rock's Guide to Hollywood, which won an Outstanding Achievement Award at the 1996 New York Festivals® International Television & Film Awards.

White hosted the Dr Rock Show which ran on both Yorkshire and Tyne Tees Television. He has also appeared on the ground-breaking 1980s' series, The Tube. He authored biographies of Jerry Lee Lewis and Little Richard.

White has written articles for The Observer and The Independent newspapers, and for Tatler and Rolling Stone magazines.

His BBC Radio York show goes on the air every Sunday between 6pm and 7pm, GMT, but can also be heard in many countries across the globe. In December 2011, BBC Radio announced that some 40 hours of local broadcasting a week would be axed in order to meet the budgeted 20 per cent cut in expenses, with Dr Rock's programme among those scheduled to go. The announcement was met with protest letters by fans.

Three years on, however, Dr Rock was still broadcasting every Sunday, and, in 2014, celebrated two full decades with BBC York, a position he still held in 2020. In 2017, White placed in auction his entire "Dr Rock collection," consisting of some five thousand vinyl records, as well as various memorabilia items.

== Books ==
- The Life and Times of Little Richard: The Authorised Biography. Omnibus Press. 2003. ISBN 978-0-7119-9761-5.
- Killer! The Life and Times of Jerry Lee Lewis. Arrow Books Ltd. 1996. ISBN 978-0-09-930385-5.
