= Keith Moffatt (athlete) =

American high jumper

Keith Moffatt (born June 20, 1984) is an American high jumper.

He holds a personal best jump of 2.30 metres.

== Career highlights ==
- 2006 & 2009 USA Outdoor runner-up
- 3rd at 2005 USA Outdoors
- 2003 Junior Pan Am Games gold medalist
- 2004 NCAA DII Champion
- 2003 USA Outdoor Junior Champion
- 2002 VHSL State Record 7'3"
