= Alexander Moffat (physicist) =

Reverend Professor Alexander Moffat FRSE

Personal details
- Born: c. 1870 Scotland
- Died: 4 June 1936 India
- Occupation: Physicist

Alexander Moffat (c. 1870 – 4 June 1936) was a 20th-century Scottish minister and physicist. He was professor of physics at the Christian College in Madras, India.

== Life ==
He was born in Scotland around 1870. He studied both Divinity and Physics and graduated MA BSc.

In 1892 he arrived in India and began teaching physics at the Madras Christian College.

In 1906 he was elected a Fellow of the Royal Society of Edinburgh. His proposers were James Gordon MacGregor, William Peddie, Cargill Gilston Knott and John Gibson.

He retired in 1927 and died in India on 4 June 1936.

== Family ==
Little of his personal life is known other than that he was married.
