= 1969 Progressive Conservative Party of New Brunswick leadership election =

Canadian provincial leadership election

- Date: June 14, 1969
- Convention: Saint John, New Brunswick
- Resigning leader: Charles Van Horne
- Won by: Richard Hatfield
- Ballots: 1
- Candidates: 5 (including two withdrawers)

The Progressive Conservative Party of New Brunswick held a leadership election on June 14, 1969, in Saint John, New Brunswick, to elect a new leader for the party. The position had been vacant since former leader Charles Van Horne's resignation in early 1968; Van Horne previously vowed to do so in the likelihood of his defeat in the 1967 provincial election, which he lost to the Liberal Party led by Louis Robichaud.

The front-running candidates for the leadership election were Richard Hatfield, a legislative member for Carleton who had been serving as house leader ever since Van Horne's resignation, as well as Van Horne himself, who decided to run for leadership again. Of three other candidates, only Mathilda Blanchard opted not to withdraw. Hatfield won the leadership election with 799 votes, or 58.5 percent of the votes cast. After securing leadership for the party, Hatfield went on to defeat Robichaud in the 1970 provincial election and further led the party through three re-elections, becoming the longest-served premier in the province. His leadership collapsed after a string of controversies led to his party losing every seat in his 1987 provincial re-election, leading to his immediate resignation. The next leadership election was not held until 1989, two decades after this one.

== Background ==
On February 8, 1968, then-Progressive Conservative leader Charles Van Horne announced his resignation through a letter sent to president George E. McInerney. Having been confident that he would win the 1967 provincial election, Van Horne had previously vowed to resign his leadership in the likelihood of his defeat; he was not only defeated in the election by Liberal leader Louis Robichaud but also in his home electoral district of Restigouche. Up until his resignation, it had been previously decided on November 9, 1967, that he would remain as leader, even though he would not have a seat in the legislature — rumors hinting towards the potential resignation of Lewis C. Ayles of Campbellton to allow for Van Horne to have a seat were shut down. Through his resignation letter, Van Horne reiterated his intentions to resign upon the party's defeat.

On the same day as Van Horne's resignation, five ballots were cast among the caucus to elect one of their own as a house leader. Richard Hatfield, a 37-year-old Carleton legislative member who had been defeated by Van Horne during the previous leadership convention, was elected. According to a Financial Post report from later that month, it had been under the impression that a leadership convention would be called that spring.

=== Van Horne's return to politics ===
On September 9, 1968, a seat was made vacant in Van Horne's home riding of Restigouche following the death of then-Youth Minister Joffre Daigle; nine days later, Robichaud announced a by-election for November 4 to fill the vacancy. The following month, Van Horne returned to the province and announced his candidacy on October 17. As speculation was being made earlier that month on the likelihood of Van Horne making a political return, Hatfield opposed the idea of Van Horne joining the by-election, viewing it as being "a distraction" to party progress. On the other hand, Tory president McInerney supported it; he expressed having "the greatest respect for Mr. Van Horne". Van Horne ultimately won the by-election on November 4, defeating single opponent and Liberal candidate O. R. M. Brimsacle by 186 votes. An editorial published by The Gazette on November 6 stated that Van Horne's victory "might do more to aid the Liberal Government there, than if the Liberal candidate had won".

A scheduled party meeting in Fredericton for November 23 emerged along with the topic of a new potential leadership election. Van Horne was also speculated to be a candidate for it, though the meeting concluded with no definite plan to call for a leadership convention yet. It was highlighted that Hatfield and Van Horne were both fighting for leadership around this time; Van Horne was reportedly showing interest in being leader again, though many Conservatives also showed disinterest towards the idea.

== Leadership convention ==
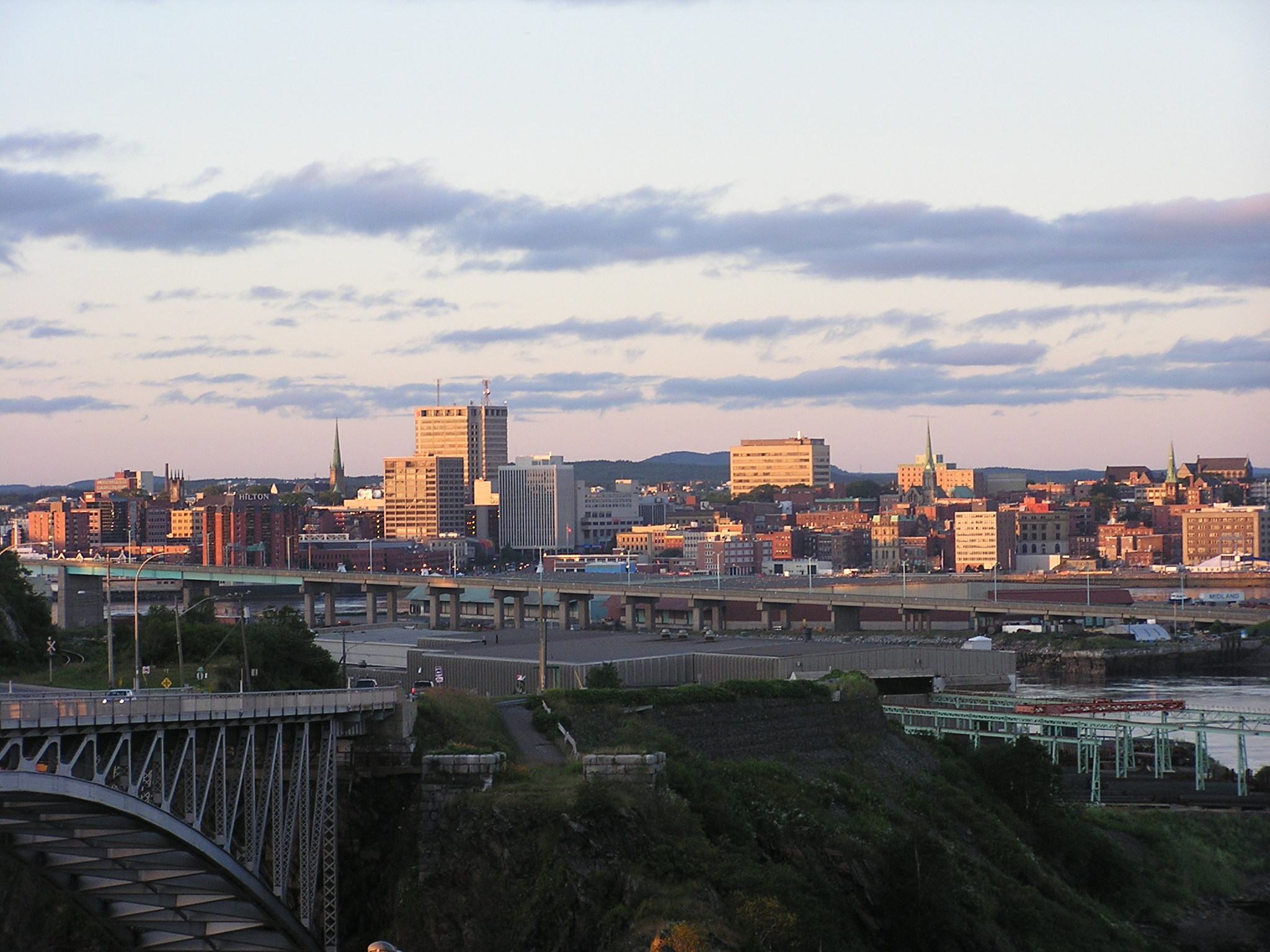
Saint John, the location in which the convention was held, pictured in 2006

In early April 1969, the Progressive Conservative party called for a leadership convention to be held at Saint John on June 14. Although his candidacy was not specifically announced, Hatfield made it clear that he would seek candidacy. It was also expected that Van Horne would emerge as a contender. Another speculated candidate at the time was also Paul Creaghan, a lawyer from Moncton. Although it had already been well-established that caucus members preferred Hatfield, it was also clear that this did not indicate his victory, given that this also happened during the last leadership election which Van Horne carried by a three-to-one margin.

Ian R. Ferguson, a 21-year-old University of New Brunswick (UNB) student from Grand Falls who served as the editor-in-chief of UNB's student newspaper The Brunswickan, was the first to declare candidacy for the leadership election on April 15; the reasons he gave for running were because of the "lack in representation of [his] age group in provincial affairs, the lack of government communication with the people of New Brunswick, and specifically because of the sad state of higher education in the province in general". Ferguson, however, never ultimately ended up becoming a candidate at the convention, as evidenced by his name having not appeared in the election results. It was also reported at this point that Van Horne was considering seeking candidacy.

Hatfield officially declared his candidacy for leadership on April 24. Van Horne—who was in Phoenix, Arizona, at the time—was still undecided though also gave a "soon" deadline for his decision. During a news conference, Hatfield proposed "a new approach to leadership and policies to meet our province's needs". Additionally, J. Roger Pichette, Alfred Landry, Creaghan and William Cockburn were all speculated by the Montreal Star as being "potential candidates", though they ultimately likely decided against running. In early May, Van Horne unexpectedly decided against running, adding that "my position regarding the leadership remains unchanged". Up until this point, Van Horne was anticipated as the primary contender against Hatfield. As early as almost a week later, however, Van Horne hinted towards changing his mind.

On May 16, Van Horne changed his mind and officially announced his candidacy for leadership, stating that he was urged from all ridings "that [he] should be a candidate for leader". The upcoming convention, which was to have 1,600 Tory delegates in attendance, was described by James Ferrabee of The Gazette as a "re-run of 1966" though now, as described by Ferrabee, with more credibility towards Hatfield. Ferrabee described Hatfield as being "quiet-spoken and low-key" in contrast to the "flamboyant and loud" Van Horne. Ferrabee further wrote that the 1966 delegates had been "persuaded that Van Horne was the only man who could beat Louis Robichaud in an election which they knew then wasn't far off", though Van Horne, on the other hand—being from the northern and majority Francophone part of the province—had the advantage of potentially having the stronger vote from Acadian delegates due to being a much stronger French speaker than the Anglophone-originating Hatfield.

Mathilda Blanchard, a labour leader from Caraquet who served as the provincial fish handlers' union president, also announced her candidacy for leadership on May 26, stating that "I think there are so many things unsaid and undone", though her candidacy was not generally taken seriously and was considered as being one that "really doesn't count". Other considered candidates at this point included Joseph MacDougall, who shortly afterwards lost his bid to retain his position of Mayor of Saint John; Leonard C. Jones, the Mayor of Moncton; the earlier-considered Creaghan, who reportedly "considered entering the race"; and Jean-Maurice Simard.

In the days leading up to the convention, Hatfield was considered as being the victor. Van Horne stated that the Liberal victory in 1967 was "by the skin of their teeth", adding that "he has the best chance to lead the party to victory in the next provincial election". On June 10, a legal petition for bankruptcy was filed against Van Horne; it was related to a consent decree from December 1968 in which Van Horne was ordered to pay $17,586. Those who filed the action alleged that Van Horne was bankrupt because he had not paid the debt, despite a writ being issued to do so on December 20, 1968. No assets in his name which could've been used to seize and satisfy the debt were able to be found by the sheriff of Restigouche County, who returned the writ marked "nulla bona". Van Horne was described as being a free spender who substantially indebted the party during his 1967 provincial campaign; the upcoming convention was blacklisted by the American Federation of Musicians from allowing for work to be serviced by its members, as the party hadn't paid a $12,500 bill signed by Van Horne for Don Messer and His Islanders to perform at the time. Hatfield was also described by opponents, per The Toronto Star, as a "wealthy businessman" who "can't speak for the majority of New Brunswick's people". Van Horne would additionally attack Hatfield, labelling him as a "mama's boy".

Hatfield and Van Horne filed for nomination on June 11, 1969. That same day, William T. Walker, who had just lost his over decade-long mayoral position in Fredericton earlier that week, declared that he was "definitely in the running", adding that he had "a good chance" of winning in the first ballot. Jones, who had been earlier considered as being a candidate, announced having "very serious consideration" for a candidacy run based on "personal matters", though he later chose not to run. The next day, Blanchard, Walker, and MacDougall filed for nomination in the final hour before the deadline.

=== Election results ===
The leadership election for the party took place on June 14, 1969. It was held in Saint John for 1,600 Tory delegates to vote between Hatfield or Van Horne, both considered front-runners, or Blanchard. Robert Stanfield, then-leader of the national Progressive Conservative party, served as the convention's keynote speaker. The day prior, Van Horne attacked Hatfield for "lacking frankness and guts" while also saying that "people resent leadership that is devious and uncourageous". Hatfield's response made no mention of Van Horne, saying that he was "running for the party, not against anyone".

The result of the election was publicized on June 16; Hatfield secured an overall majority during the first ballot with 799 votes, or 58.5 percent of the vote, to Van Horne's 554 votes, which amounted to 40.5 percent of the votes cast. Blanchard, the only other candidate, received 13 votes, or about one percent of the votes cast. Walker and McDougall, the two other registered candidates, each withdrew after offering a speech before the casting of votes.

1969 PCNB leadership result
Candidate	Votes	%
Richard Hatfield	799	58.5%
Charles Van Horne	554	40.5%
Mathilda Blanchard	13	1%
Total votes	1,366	100%

== Aftermath ==
Hatfield, as the newly elected party leader, went on to defeat Robichaud in the 1970 provincial election. That same year, he appointed Van Horne as the Minister of Tourism following pressure accumulated as a result of Van Horne's popularity. Hatfield continued to lead the Progressive Conservatives through three victorious re-elections, ultimately having the longest term served by a premier in the province. His 17-year leadership started going downhill when, on September 25, 1984, he was found in possession of marijuana during a security check that the Royal Canadian Mounted Police conducted before a flight from Fredericton to Moncton during a royal visit by Queen Elizabeth II. This incident and the ensuing scandals led to a number of other Tories turning against him, with the party going on to lose all 58 legislative seats in his 1987 provincial re-election to the Frank McKenna–led Liberal Party. Hatfield and his party's defeat marked one of the worst in Canadian history; the only other time a majority-led party lost all of its seats in Canada was in Prince Edward Island during its 1935 election. The loss led to Hatfield's immediate resignation. The next leadership convention, held in 1989, saw Barbara Baird Filliter emerge as the first woman to become leader of a Conservative party in Canada.

Another leadership convention for a provincial political party would not be held in Saint John for nearly three decades, after which it held the 1998 New Brunswick Liberal Association leadership election.

== See also ==
- Progressive Conservative Party of New Brunswick leadership elections
