= Restigouche (provincial electoral district) =

Defunct provincial electoral district in New Brunswick, Canada

New Brunswick electoral district

Defunct provincial electoral district
- Legislature: Legislative Assembly of New Brunswick
- District created: 1838
- District abolished: 1973
- First contested: 1843
- Last contested: 1970

Restigouche was a provincial electoral district for the Legislative Assembly of New Brunswick, Canada. It used a bloc voting system to elect candidates, and was created from Gloucester in 1838. It was abolished with the 1973 electoral redistribution, when the province moved to single-member ridings.

== Members of the Legislative Assembly ==
Legislature	Years	Member	Party	Member	Party	Member	Party
Riding created from Gloucester
13th	1843 – 1846	Andrew Barberie	Ind.	Peter Stewart	Ind.		
14th	1847 – 1850	Andrew Barberie	Ind.	John Montgomery	Ind.		
15th	1851 – 1854	Andrew Barberie	Ind.	John Montgomery	Ind.		
16th	1854 – 1856	Chipman Botsford	Ind.	John Montgomery	Ind.		
17th	1856 – 1857	Andrew Barberie	Ind.	John Montgomery	Ind.		
18th	1857 – 1861	John McMillan	Ind.	John Montgomery	Ind.		
19th	1862 – 1865	John McMillan	Ind.	John Montgomery	Ind.		
20th	1865 – 1866	John McMillan	Ind.	Alexander C. DesBrisay	Conf.		
21st	1866 – 1867	John McMillan	Ind.	Alexander C. DesBrisay	Conf.		
21st	1867 – 1870	William Montgomery	Ind.	Alexander C. DesBrisay	Conf.		
22nd	1870	William Montgomery	Ind.	Alexander C. DesBrisay	Conf.		
22nd	1870 – 1874	William Montgomery	Ind.	John Phillips	Lib.		
23rd	1875 – 1878	Archibald McKenzie	Ind.	John Phillips	Lib.		
24th	1879 – 1882	Joseph Cunard Barberie	Lib.	Thomas F. Kenny	Lib.-Con.		
25th	1883 – 1885	Joseph Cunard Barberie	Lib.	Charles H. LaBillois	Cons.		
25th	1885 – 1886	William Murray	Lib.-Con.	Charles H. LaBillois	Cons.		
26th	1886 – 1890	William Murray	Lib.-Con.	Charles H. LaBillois	Cons.		
27th	1890 – 1892	William Murray	Lib.-Con.	Charles H. LaBillois	Cons.		
28th	1892 – 1895	William A. Mott	Ind.	Charles H. LaBillois	Cons.		
29th	1896 – 1899	William A. Mott	Ind.	Charles H. LaBillois	Cons.		
30th	1899 – 1903	William A. Mott	Ind.	Charles H. LaBillois	Cons.		
31st	1903 – 1908	Henry F. McLatchy	Ind.	Charles H. LaBillois	Cons.		
32nd	1908 – 1912	William Currie	Liberal	Charles H. LaBillois	Cons.		
33rd	1912 – 1917	David A. Stewart	Cons.	Arthur Culligan	Cons.		
34th	1917 – 1920	Arthur T. Leblanc	Lib.	William Currie	Lib.		
35th	1921 – 1925	David A. Stewart	Cons.	Henry Diotte	Cons.		
36th	1925 – 1930	David A. Stewart	Cons.	Henry Diotte	Cons.		
37th	1931 – 1935	David A. Stewart	Cons.	Henry Diotte	Cons.		
38th	1935 – 1939	Hedley Francis Gregory Bridges	Lib.	Philibert LeBlanc	Lib.		
39th	1939 – 1944	David A. Stewart	Cons.	Edward Samuel Mooers	Lib.		
40th	1944 – 1945	Benoît Michaud	Lib.	Edward Samuel Mooers	Lib.		
40th	1945 – 1948	Jean-Baptiste D'Astous	Lib.	Edward Samuel Mooers	Lib.		
41st	1948 – 1952	Jean-Baptiste D'Astous	Lib.	Edward Samuel Mooers	Lib.		
42nd	1952 – 1956	Douglas B. Pettigrew	PC	J. Roger Pichette	PC	Fred Somers	PC
43rd	1957 – 1960	Douglas B. Pettigrew	PC	J. Roger Pichette	PC	Fred Somers	PC
44th	1960 – 1963	Georges Dumont	Lib.	John D. Alexander	Lib.	Patrick Guérette	Lib.
45th	1963 – 1967	Georges Dumont	Lib.	Raymond Doucett	Lib.	Patrick Guérette	Lib.
46th	1967 – 1968	Wilfred Sénéchal	Lib.	Raymond Doucett	Lib.	J. M. Joffre Daigle	Lib.
46th	1968 – 1970	Wilfred Sénéchal	Lib.	Raymond Doucett	Lib.	Charles Van Horne	PC
47th	1970 – 1974	Edèse J. Bujold	Lib.	Rayburn Doucett	Lib.	J. Alfred Russell	Lib.
Riding dissolved into Dalhousie, Restigouche East and Restigouche West

== Election results ==
1970 New Brunswick general election
Party	Candidate	Votes	Elected
Liberal	Edèse Bujold	5,966	✓
Liberal	Rayburn D. Doucett	5,605	✓
Liberal	J. Alfred Roussel	5,321	✓
Progressive Conservative	John Potter	5,260	
Progressive Conservative	Roger McIntyre	5,011	
Progressive Conservative	George Thibeault	4,508	
New Democratic	Ralph Rose	264	

New Brunswick provincial by-election, 9 September 1968
Party	Candidate	Votes	Elected
Progressive Conservative	J. C. Van Horne	5,447	✓
Liberal	O. R. M. Brimsacle	5,292	

1967 New Brunswick general election
Party	Candidate	Votes	Elected
Liberal	Raymond D. Doucett	6,649	✓
Liberal	Joffre Daigle	5,579	✓
Liberal	J. H. Wilfred Sénéchal	5,579	✓
Progressive Conservative	J. C. Van Horne	5,362	
Progressive Conservative	Edmund LeBLanc	5,141	
Progressive Conservative	Douglas Pettigrew	5,140	

== See also ==
- List of New Brunswick provincial electoral districts
- Canadian provincial electoral districts
