= Wilfred Sénéchal =

Canadian politician (1918–2000)

- Born: August 7, 1918; Campbellton, New Brunswick; Canada
- Died: February 11, 2000 (aged 81); Campbellton, New Brunswick, Canada
- Education: University of New Brunswick
- Occupations: Lawyer, politician
- Political party: Liberal
- Spouse: Lumina Pardiac
- Children: Monique Sénéchal, Jacques Sénéchal, John Sénéchal, Richard Sénéchal

Joseph Henry Wilfred Sénéchal MM, BCL (August 7, 1918 – February 11, 2000) was a Canadian lawyer, a decorated World War II soldier, and a politician.

He was born in Campbellton, New Brunswick. Immediately upon the outbreak of World War II in 1939, the eighteen-year-old Wilfred Sénéchal volunteered for duty with the Canadian Army, serving until his discharge in 1945 in the months following Victory in Europe Day. Sénéchal served overseas with the Royal Canadian Infantry Corps as a member of New Brunswick's Carelton and York Regiment. He was part of the Dieppe Raid in which more than sixty percent of the men who made it ashore were either killed, wounded, or captured. The British government awarded him the Military Medal for bravery in battle.

On returning home, Sénéchal pursued a secondary education, graduating in 1954 from the University of New Brunswick with a Bachelor of Civil Law degree.

== Political career ==
In 1967, Sénéchal was a successful candidate for the Liberal Party in the New Brunswick general election, winning a seat in the Legislative Assembly of New Brunswick as the member for Restigouche County. He was made Deputy Speaker of the 46th New Brunswick Legislative Assembly. In the 1970 election Sénéchal lost his bid to win a seat in the City of Campbellton to the popular former Progressive Conservative Party leader, Charles Van Horne. In 1978, he lost to incumbent Fernand Dubé in the City of Campbellton riding in the 1978 provincial election.

Sénéchal died February 11, 2000, at the Campbellton Regional Hospital. He is buried in the Notre-Dame-des-Neiges Church Cemetery (Our Lady of Snow Church Cemetery).

Legislative Assembly of New Brunswick
Preceded by Patrick Guérette	MLA for Restigouche County; 1967-1970	Succeeded by Edèse J. Bujold
