= 1989 Progressive Conservative Party of New Brunswick leadership election =

Canadian provincial leadership election

- Date: November 3–4, 1989
- Convention: Fredericton, New Brunswick
- Resigning leader: Richard Hatfield
- Won by: Barbara Baird Filliter
- Ballots: 1
- Candidates: 2

The Progressive Conservative Party of New Brunswick held a leadership election between November 3–4, 1989, to elect a new leader for the party. The position had been held in an interim capacity by Malcolm MacLeod since former leader Richard Hatfield's resignation immediately following the 1987 general election after 17 years in power. Hatfield had been surrounded by a string of controversies during the later years of his leadership, leading to the party's loss of all of its seats in the Legislative Assembly of New Brunswick to the Liberal Party, led by Frank McKenna.

The front-runner for the leadership election was Barbara Baird Filliter, a young lawyer from Fredericton who had recently joined the party. Baird's competitor was Hazen Myers, a former member in the legislature under Hatfield's leadership. Baird won the leadership election with 1,021 votes, or 74.6 percent of the votes cast, marking the first woman to lead a conservative party in Canada.

== Background ==
On September 25, 1984, then-Progressive Conservative party leader Richard Hatfield was found in possession of marijuana during a security check that the Royal Canadian Mounted Police conducted before a flight from Fredericton to Moncton during a royal visit by Queen Elizabeth II. This incident and the following scandals that ensued led to a number of other Tories turning against him, with the party going on to lose all 58 legislative seats in the 1987 election to the Liberals under leader Frank McKenna. Hatfield and his party's defeat marked one of the worst in Canadian history; the only other time a majority-led party lost all of its seats in Canada was in Prince Edward Island during its 1935 election. The loss led to Hatfield's instant resignation. Malcolm MacLeod served as the interim leader until the next leadership election.

== Leadership election ==
In July 1989, nearly two years after the party's defeat, Hazen Myers, a Sussex politician who had previously been the Minister of Agriculture under Hatfield's leadership, announced his candidacy for the leadership of the Progressive Conservative Party. His goal was to "restore the Conservatives to their place in the province's political life." Myers' past association with Hatfield raised concerns among many Conservatives who sought a fresh start with a new leader. The most likely contender was Barbara Baird Filliter, a lawyer from Fredericton who was expected to declare her candidacy by the following month. She did so in mid-August. Baird fit the Conservatives' interest as a "fresh face and a contemporary of a newer, younger breed" of politicians in the province. The leadership election, the first for the party in two decades, was scheduled to take pace between November 3–4. Other politicians considered as potential candidates at the time included Saint John mayor Elsie Wayne, Bud Bird, and David McLaughlin, though none of them ended up running.

Bilingualism was one of New Brunswick's largest issues at the time. The newly-formed provincial Confederation of Regions Party, an extension of the federal party known for its anti-bilingual views, took a considerable amount of the Progressive Conservative's supporters. Myers expressed support for bilingualism when "applied fairly", adding that "it's not right for people to be denied jobs simply because they can't speak more than one language." Baird criticized Liberal leader McKenna, stating that he "has neglected his leadership duties" after having "waited for eight to 10 months until linguistic tensions in this province reached such a point that he had to react ... and when he reacted he said he's not prepared to change his language policy or listen to New Brunswickers."

=== Election results ===
The leadership election for the party began on November 3, 1989. It was held in Fredericton for 1,669 Tory delegates to vote between Baird or Myers, who both participated in a debate held that night. Given her recency to the party which had "grown wary of its old guard" giving her the advantage, Baird was considered to be the front-runner. Richard Johnson, a previous president of the party, temporarily ran as a third candidate for three weeks until withdrawing due to "insufficient financial and personal support".

Baird won the election with 1,021 votes, or 74.6 percent of the vote, to Myers' 348 votes, which amounted to 25.4 percent of the votes cast. The election saw the first woman to become leader of a conservative party in Canada.

1989 PCNB leadership result
Candidate	Votes	%
Barbara Baird Filliter	1,021	74.6%
Hazen Myers	348	25.4%
Total votes	1,369	100%

== Aftermath ==
Tories would ultimately grow dissatisfied with Baird, feeling that she "hadn't been able to put the party back on its feet". Baird resigned on April 12, 1991, adding that "she no longer had the confidence of the party".

== See also ==
- Progressive Conservative Party of New Brunswick leadership elections
