= Progressive Conservative Party of New Brunswick leadership elections =

This page lists the results of leadership elections held by the Progressive Conservative Party of New Brunswick or as it was known before March 3, 1943, the Conservative Party. Before 1925 leaders were chosen by the caucus.

== 1925 leadership convention ==
On May 27, 1925, John Babington Macaulay Baxter accepted an offer to lead the party in Saint John.

== Developments 1925-1937 ==
Baxter resigned as premier on appointment to the bench in 1931 and was succeeded as premier by Charles Richards on May 18 of that year. Richards was in turn appointed to the bench in 1933 and was succeeded as premier by Leonard Tilley on June 2 of that year. Following Tilley's personal defeat in the 1935 general election which also saw the Conservatives swept from power he resigned and Frederick C. Squires was chosen House leader on September 10.

== 1937 leadership convention ==
(Held on October 27, 1937)

- Frederick C. Squires acclaimed

Squires resigned after the 1939 general election and Hugh H. Mackay was chosen House leader on January 20, 1940.

== 1942 leadership convention ==
(Held on September 23, 1942)

- Hugh H. Mackay acclaimed

== 1951 leadership convention ==
(Held on July 11, 1951)

- Hugh John Flemming acclaimed

Following his government's defeat in the 1960 general election Flemming was appointed to the federal cabinet and resigned as party leader. Cyril Sherwood was chosen House leader on November 5, 1960.

T. Babbitt Parlee was the only other contender.

== 1962 leadership convention ==
(Held on October 27, 1962)

- Cyril Sherwood acclaimed

== 1966 leadership convention ==
(Held on November 26, 1966)

- Charles Van Horne 458
- Richard Hatfield 135
- Roger Pichette 9

Van Horne was defeated in the 1967 election and resigned on February 8, 1968. Richard Hatfield was chosen House leader.

== 1969 leadership convention ==
(Held on June 14, 1969)

- Richard Hatfield 799
- Charles Van Horne 554
- Mathilda Blanchard 13

Joe McDougall and William T. Walker withdrew before balloting.

== 1989 leadership convention ==
(Held November 4, 1989)

- Barbara Baird Filliter 1,021
- Hazen Myers 348

== 1991 leadership convention ==
(Held June 15, 1991)

- Dennis Cochrane 955
- Bev Lawrence 116

== 1995 leadership convention ==
(Held May 13, 1995)

- Bernard Valcourt 944
- Scott MacGregor 416
- John Hazen 47

== 1997 leadership convention ==
(Held October 18, 1997)

First Ballot:

- Bernard Lord 1,390
- Norm Betts 1,223
- Cleveland Allaby 663
- Margaret-Ann Blaney 527

Second Ballot (Blaney eliminated, Allaby withdrew):

- Bernard Lord 1,830
- Norm Betts 1,413

== 2008 leadership convention ==
(Held on October 18, 2008)

- David Alward 2,269
- Robert MacLeod 1,760

== 2016 leadership convention ==
(Held on October 22, 2016)

First Ballot:

- Blaine Higgs 1,228
- Mel Norton 1,078
- Monica Barley 948
- Mike Allen 892
- Jake Stewart 700
- Brian McDonald 605
- Jean F. Dubé 39

(Stewart, McDonald and Dubé eliminated)

Second Ballot:

- Blaine Higgs 1,417
- Mel Norton 993
- Monica Barley 861
- Mike Allen 829

(Barley and Allen eliminated)

Third Ballot:

- Blaine Higgs 1,563
- Mel Norton 1,169

== 2026 leadership convention ==
(Held on October 17, 2026)

- Daniel Allain 2,543
- Don Monahan 1,797

== See also ==
- leadership convention
- Progressive Conservative Party of New Brunswick
