= George Haddow =

Canadian politician

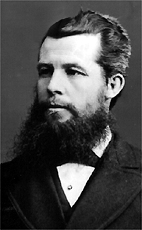

Member of Parliament for Restigouche
- In office 1878–1882

Personal details
- Born: December 10, 1833 Douglastown, New Brunswick
- Died: November 11, 1919 (aged 85)
- Party: Independent
- Spouse: Elizabeth McCurdy
- Profession: merchant

George Haddow (December 10, 1833 – November 11, 1919) was a Canadian politician and merchant.

Born in Douglastown, New Brunswick, Canada, the son of Robert Haddow and Elizabeth Taylor, he was educated in Northumberland County and became a merchant in Dalhousie. In 1859, Haddow married Elizabeth McCurdy. He was acclaimed in a by-election, upon George Moffatt's resignation, to the House of Commons of Canada as an independent MP to represent the riding of Restigouche. He was acclaimed in the 1878 election. He lost both the elections of 1882 and 1887.
