= John McAlister =

Canadian politician

John McAlister KC
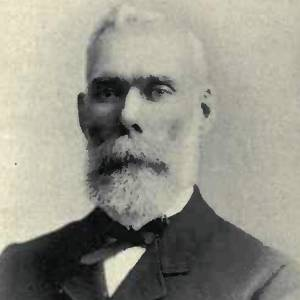

Member of the Canadian Parliament for Restigouche
- In office 1891–1900
- Preceded by: George Moffat Jr.
- Succeeded by: James Reid

Personal details
- Born: July 27, 1842 Durham Centre
- Died: November 4, 1918 (aged 76) Campbellton, New Brunswick
- Party: Liberal-Conservative

John McAlister, KC (July 27, 1842 – November 4, 1918) was a lawyer and political figure in New Brunswick, Canada. He represented Restigouche in the House of Commons of Canada from 1891 to 1900 as a Liberal-Conservative member.

He was born in Durham Centre, New Brunswick, of Scottish descent, and was educated there and at Miramichi. He was called to the bar in 1879. He was the first mayor of Campbellton, serving from 1888 to 1889. In 1894, McAlister was named Queen's Counsel. He died in Campbellton at the age of 76. John McAlister was also the First President of the Caledonian Society of Restigouche in 1898.
