= Jean-Eudes Dubé =

Canadian politician (1926–2019)

The Honourable Jean-Eudes Dubé PC QC
- Official portrait, 1974

Member of Parliament for Restigouche
- In office June 25, 1968 – April 8, 1975
- Preceded by: District created
- Succeeded by: Maurice Harquail

Member of Parliament for Restigouche—Madawaska
- In office June 18, 1962 – June 24, 1968
- Preceded by: Edgar Fournier
- Succeeded by: District abolished

Personal details
- Born: November 6, 1926 Matapédia, Quebec, Canada
- Died: January 5, 2019 (aged 92) Ottawa, Ontario, Canada
- Occupation: Lawyer; Judge
- Cabinet: Minister of Veterans Affairs (1968–1972); Minister of Public Works (1972–1974); Minister of National Defence (Acting) (1972)
- Committees: Chair, Standing Committee on External Affairs (1966–1968)

Jean-Eudes Dubé PC QC (November 6, 1926 – January 5, 2019) was a Canadian politician.

Dubé first ran for a seat in the House of Commons of Canada as a Liberal in a 1961 by-election, but was defeated in the New Brunswick riding of Restigouche—Madawaska. He was elected from the same riding in the 1962 general election, and was subsequently re-elected on five occasions. (From 1968 on, he was elected from the riding of Restigouche.)

Following the 1968 election, Dubé joined the Cabinet of Prime Minister Pierre Trudeau as Minister of Veterans Affairs. In 1972, he was appointed Minister of Public Works.

Dubé was dropped from Cabinet following the 1974 election, left Parliament the following year, and was named as a judge to the Federal Court of Canada, a position he held until his retirement in 2001.

Dubé died from natural causes on January 5, 2019. He was 92.

1974 Canadian federal election: Restigouche
Party	Candidate	Votes	%	±%
Liberal	Jean-Eudes Dubé	12,492	55.5	+6.8
Progressive Conservative	Guy Laviolette	4,695	20.9	-1.9
Social Credit	Benoit Castonguay	3,053	13.6	+13.6
New Democratic Party	Edgar Dugas	2,262	10.1	+5.5
Total		22,502		

1972 Canadian federal election: Restigouche
Party	Candidate	Votes	%	±%
Liberal	Jean-Eudes Dubé	11,650	48.7	-2.4
Independent	Alexander Sandy MacLean	5,698	23.8	+23.8
Progressive Conservative	Guy Laviolette	5,450	22.8	-13.2
New Democratic Party	Edgar Dugas	1,110	4.6	+0.8
Total		23,908		

1968 Canadian federal election: Restigouche
Party	Candidate	Votes	%	±%
Liberal	Jean-Eudes Dubé	9,991	51.1	*
Progressive Conservative	Hector Arseneault	7,049	36.0	*
Ralliement créditiste	André Boudreau	1,769	9.0	*
New Democratic Party	Bruce Peacock	748	3.8	*
Total		19,557		
