= Mathilda Blanchard =

Canadian politician

- Born: Mathilda Landry; December 10, 1920; Caraquet, New Brunswick, Canada
- Died: July 1, 2007 (aged 86)
- Occupation: Labour leader
- Known for: Union organizing among Acadian seafood and seasonal workers
- Political party: Progressive Conservative (leadership candidate 1969)
- Movement: Acadian labor movement
- Children: 3
- Relatives: Sylvia Landry-Blanchard (sister); Michel-Vital Blanchard (son); Louise Blanchard (daughter)
- Awards: Prix Séraphin-Marion (1988)

Mathilda Blanchard (born Mathilda Landry; December 10, 1920 – July 1, 2007) was a Canadian labour leader. She was nicknamed la pasionaria acadienne due to her engagement and defense of Acadian workers in New Brunswick, particularly in the seafood trade.

== Biography ==
Born in Caraquet, New Brunswick, on December 10, 1920, Mathilda Blanchard grew up in a middle-class family. Her family has roots in the organized labor movement. Her younger sister, Sylvia Landry-Blanchard, served as president of the International Pulp and Paper Union Local 464 in Rumford, Maine for over twenty years and was later a member of the executive board for the Maine AFL–CIO. Sylvia and Mathilda would later marry two brothers from the same family.

At age 20, she assisted the war effort, working in munitions factories in Windsor, Ontario and Montréal. Unable to make enough money to enroll in law school, Blanchard instead took a course in hairdressing and returned to Acadia.

For more than fifty years, Blanchard organized independent unions of workers in fish processing plants all over the Acadian peninsula. Her defense of seasonal workers and her outspoken demeanor gained her respect among both allies and adversaries.Union leader and former Member of Parliament Yvon Godin compared Blanchard to Québécois labour leader Michel Chartrand, saying they shared a similar flamboyant style. Acadian author Rino Morin Rossignol wrote that "Her anger was terrible and her speech terrifying".

Two of Blanchard's three children were also involved in Acadian issues. Michel-Vital Blanchard was an activist for student's rights as well as the francization of Moncton in 1968 — a history that was recounted in the documentary Acadia, Acadia (L'Acadie, L'Acadie?!?) by Michel Brault and Pierre Perrault. Additionally, Blanchard's daughter Louise briefly led the Parti acadien, prior to its dissolution in 1981.

=== Politics and strike actions ===
In the mid-1960s, Blanchard formed the Canadian Union for the Fisheries Industry and Affiliated Workers, which represented over 10,000 workers. Blanchard took part in numerous strikes aimed at improving the lives of seasonal workers in the fisheries industry. In 1972, Blanchard served as figurehead for a movement to diversify the economy of Northeast New Brunswick, which struggled with chronic unemployment.

Blanchard's work with the Acadian Affiliated Fisheries Workers Union and her involvement with the Committee of 12 for Social Justice in New Brunswick led to her active participation in protests against changes to Employment Insurance in 1992 and 1994. The protest movement helped lead to the defeat of Liberal Party candidates in the Acadian-majority ridings of Acadie—Bathurst and Beauséjour during the 1997 Canadian federal election. Blanchard also advocated on behalf of factory workers who were not given enough hours to qualify for Employment Insurance.

Blanchard became the first woman to run for political party leadership in Canada during the 1969 Progressive Conservative Party of New Brunswick leadership election, coming a distant third behind Richard Hatfield, who became Premier of New Brunswick the next year. Blanchard would later run as an independent candidate in the 1972 federal election, receiving 3% of the vote in the riding of Gloucester.

According to Acadian labour activist Jean-Marie Nadeau, the work of syndicalists like Mathilda Blanchard and Yvon Godin were crucial for the labor movement in New Brunswick.

Even today, no fish plant in Southeastern New Brunswick is unionized. As for the Northeast, with the help of Mathilda Blanchard and Yvon Godin, for example, most of the factories were able to be unionized. But above all, certain working conditions have been able to be improved, because gains in wages have been smaller.

— Jean-Marie Nadeau,

.

Blanchard was a history buff and a supporter of the British monarchy. During Prince Charles's visit to the Village Historique Acadien in 1996, Blanchard broke protocol and received an autograph from the Prince on her copy of his book A Vision of Britain: A Personal View of Architecture.

=== In film ===
The National Film Board of Canada produced a documentary about Blanchard in 1997. The film, entitled Mathilda, la passionnaria acadienne, covers her career and her provocative outspokenness. Director Ginette Pellerin recognized this outspoken nature, saying:

I found myself facing a woman who needed to be in control of things. Every day, to her, was like an arm-wrestling match. I had to continually negotiate with Mathilda. She wanted to control the business and so did I. She discussed everything, event the scenes that we had previously discussed. That was her nature.

— Ginette Pellerin, .

Blanchard was also interviewed in the 1972 National Film Board film Un soleil pas comme ailleurs by Léonard Forest.

== Honours ==
- 1988 - Prix Séraphin-Marion

== Filmography ==
- Ginette Pellerin. Mathilda, la passionnaria acadienne. Office national du film du Canada. 1997. 47 min 28 s.
