= Raymond Doucett =

Canadian politician

Raymond D. Doucett

Member of the Legislative Assembly of New Brunswick
- In office 1963–1970
- Constituency: Restigouche

Personal details
- Born: May 6, 1907 Charlo, New Brunswick
- Died: March 29, 1970 (aged 62) Fredericton, New Brunswick
- Party: Liberal Party of New Brunswick
- Spouse: Catherine Ila Lutes
- Occupation: merchant

Raymond Daniel Doucett (May 6, 1907 – March 29, 1970) was a wholesale grocer and political figure in New Brunswick, Canada. He represented Restigouche County in the Legislative Assembly of New Brunswick from 1963 to 1970 as a Liberal member.

He was born in Charlo, New Brunswick, the son of Peter Doucett and Annabell Henderson. In 1926, he married Catherine Ila Lutes. Doucett served as chairman of the school board, also served on the council for Restigouche County and was a justice of the peace. Doucett served as Minister of Public Works in the province's Executive Council from 1967 to 1970.

His son Rayburn also served in the provincial assembly.

== Sources ==
- Canadian Parliamentary Guide, 1968, PG Normandin
