= William Murray Caldwell =

Canadian politician (1832–1870)

William Murray Caldwell (May 18, 1832 – September 29, 1870) was a New Brunswick businessman and political figure. He represented Restigouche in the House of Commons of Canada as a Liberal member from 1868 to 1870.

He was born in Douglastown, New Brunswick (now part of Miramichi) in 1832, the son of William Caldwell, was educated at Campbellton and settled in Dalhousie. In 1857, Caldwell married a Miss McGregor. He was a justice in the Court of Common Pleas and served in the local militia. He was elected in an 1868 by-election after John McMillan resigned his seat to accept the post of Inspector of Post Offices. Caldwell died in Dalhousie, New Brunswick in 1870 while still in office.

By-election on 13 March 1868
| Party | Candidate | Votes |
| Liberal | William Murray Caldwell | 353 |
| Conservative | George Moffat Sr. | 306 |
