= Rayburn Doucett =

Canadian politician

Member of the Legislative Assembly of New Brunswick
- In office 1970–1995
- Succeeded by: Carolle de Ste. Croix
- Constituency: Restigouche; Restigouche East

Personal details
- Born: Rayburn Donald Doucett; January 2, 1943 (age 83) Campbellton, New Brunswick
- Party: Liberal Party of New Brunswick
- Spouse: Jane Mary Crosby (m. 1964)
- Relations: Raymond Doucett (father)
- Occupation: Merchant

Rayburn Donald Doucett (born January 2, 1943) is a former merchant and political figure in New Brunswick, Canada. He represented Restigouche County and then Restigouche East in the Legislative Assembly of New Brunswick from 1970 to 1995 as a Liberal member, latterly as Minister with several portfolios under Premier Frank McKenna.

He was for three terms of five years the CEO of the Port of Belledune until his retirement in 2015. His name now graces Terminal 4. He writes occasional op-eds in support of higher taxes in the New Brunswick press, and served in 2015 as President of Crosswaters Trade Brokers Limited.

== Biography ==
He was born in Campbellton, New Brunswick, the son of Raymond Daniel Doucett and Catherine Ila Lutes. In 1964, he married Jane Mary Crosby. He served as a school board trustee and municipal councillor for Jacquet River. Doucett was Chairman of the New Brunswick Electric Power Commission from 1987 to 1990 and later was Minister of Commerce and Technology and then Minister to the New Brunswick Regional Development Corporation. He went on to serve on the board of directors for Export Development Canada.

He was, as of 2015, a member of the Board of Trustees of the NBCC Foundation, the Greater Bathurst Chamber of Commerce and the Charlo Regional Airport Committee.

== Sources ==
- Canadian Parliamentary Guide, 1988, PG Normandin
