= Philibert LeBlanc =

Canadian politician

Member of the Legislative Assembly of New Brunswick
- In office 1935–1939
- Constituency: Restigouche

Personal details
- Born: April 20, 1890 Carleton, Quebec
- Died: June 13, 1964 (aged 74) Campbellton, New Brunswick
- Party: New Brunswick Liberal Association
- Spouse: Evelina Bourg
- Children: 5
- Education: Maple Grove, New Brunswick
- Occupation: farmer

Joseph Philibert LeBlanc (April 20, 1890 – June 13, 1964) was a Canadian politician. He served in the Legislative Assembly of New Brunswick as member of the Liberal party from 1935 to 1939.
