= Edèse J. Bujold =

Canadian politician

Member of the Legislative Assembly of New Brunswick
- In office 1970–1974
- Constituency: Restigouche

Personal details
- Born: September 18, 1919 Carleton, Quebec
- Died: April 22, 2001 (aged 81) Dalhousie, New Brunswick
- Party: New Brunswick Liberal Association
- Spouse: Donalda Leblanc
- Children: 9
- Occupation: physician

Joseph Edèse Bujold (September 18, 1919 – April 22, 2001) was a Canadian politician. He served in the Legislative Assembly of New Brunswick from 1970 to 1974 as member of the New Brunswick Liberal Association.
