= John Phillips (Canadian politician) =

Canadian politician

John Phillips (June 16, 1810 – November 7, 1878) was an English-born political figure in New Brunswick, Canada. He represented Restigouche County in the Legislative Assembly of New Brunswick from 1870 to 1878 as a Liberal member.

He was born in Westmorland and educated in England. He immigrated to New Brunswick in 1831. The following year, he married Catherine McCarthy. He ran unsuccessfully for a seat in the provincial assembly in 1861 and again for the House of Commons in 1867. He was elected to the provincial assembly in an 1870 by-election held after Alexander C. DesBrisay resigned his seat. Phillips also served as deputy sheriff for Gloucester County. His daughter Elizabeth married Joseph Cunard Barberie.

1867 Canadian federal election: Restigouche
Party	Candidate	Votes
Liberal	John McMillan	370
Unknown	John Phillips	259
Source: Canadian Elections Database
