= Pat the White =

Pat The White
- Born: Patrick Le Blanc; July 21, 1975 (age 51)
- Origin: Carleton-sur-Mer, Quebec, Canada
- Genres: Rock, Blues, Jam band
- Occupation: Musician
- Instruments: Vocals, Guitar
- Years active: 1999–present
- Labels: Bros, DixieFrog, BSMF, Le Vaisseau D'Arts

Patrick Leblanc, better known as Pat the White, is a Canadian musician from the Gaspé region of Quebec. Leblanc was born on July 21, 1975. He grew up in the town of Carleton-sur-Mer, Quebec. He started playing guitar at a young age. It was his uncle who taught him the basics. In 1997, Leblanc left his home and worked for a while in Banff, Alberta. It was there that Leblanc discovered his biggest musical influence, The Allman Brothers Band. In 1999 he relocated to Quebec City and formed "The Pat The White Band". Since 1999, Leblanc has been playing festivals in and around Quebec. Festivals include the Mont Tremblant Blues Festival, the Montreal Jazz Festival, the Maximum Blues Festival, the "Woodstock en Beauce" Festival and the Sun Flower Gospel & Blues Festival in Clarksdale, Mississippi, U.S.

In 2002, Leblanc was involved with a small group of Gaspésie musicians, including Nanette Workman, who went down to Clarksdale, Mississippi to experience the Blues at its roots. This trip became a documentary film presented on Télé-Québec. Leblanc returned to Clarksdale in 2004. In 2003 and 2004 Leblanc was awarded Quebec's prestigious "Lysblues" Award for "Best Live Performance." In February 2004, Leblanc released his self-titled debut album; he collaborated on two tracks with Nanette Workman. That year he also headlined the Maximum Blues Festival in his home town of Carleton. His show drew a capacity crowd.

Since that performance Leblanc was invited to perform on the television program "Belle et Bum", hosted by Quebec celebrity Normand Brathwaite. Leblanc has become a regular guest on the show. In 2005, Leblanc was nominated for the Maple Blues award "Best New Artist in Canada". The band was showcased at Healey's Roadhouse as part of the Maple Blues awards. In 2006, Leblanc released his second album, Reviver. It was released at Quebec City's historic Capitole Theatre on February 10, it was a tremendous success. The album "Reviver" includes a 14-minute version of the Allman Brothers classic "Whipping Post".

Since the album launch, Leblanc's music has been featured on radio stations across Canada the U.S. and Europe. In late June, Leblanc appeared for the first time on national television, the Radio-Canada program Bons Baiser de France. A few days later the band performed to a huge crowd at the Montreal Jazz Festival. Leblanc finished off 2006 with a return engagement at the Capitole Theatre in Quebec City. In 2007, Leblanc was invited to perform on "Belle et Bum" to celebrate the program's 100th episode. The band performed at the Quebec Scene Festival in Ottawa, Ontario. The album "Reviver" was re-issued in Europe as "The Quebec City Sessions" through Dixiefrog records. The band performed at the NXNE festival in Toronto as well as on Canada day, at the Rock the Park event in Toronto's Downsview Park. On September 16 the album "Reviver" garnered two Lys Blues awards, one for Songwriter of the Year and the other for Album of the Year. In December, the album "Reviver" was released in Japan through BSMF records. In 2008, Gibson Guitar featured Pat The White as its artist of the week on Myspace. Leblanc toured France three times to promote the European release "The Quebec City Sessions". Leblanc also performed in Georgia & Florida to promote Reviver, which was made available though The Allman Brothers Band official retail outlet "Hittin' the note." In 2009, Leblanc returned to Europe for another series of shows and Sennheiser Canada sponsored Leblanc with their microphones. Pat The White Band headlined in Gaspé on July 11 as part of the city's 475th birthday celebration. 2010 marks the release of his new album "Strange Fascination" through Leblanc's new recording label "Le Vaisseau D'Arts".
