= Guy Arseneault =

Canadian politician

Guy Arseneault MLA

Member of the New Brunswick Legislative Assembly for Campbellton-Dalhousie
- Incumbent
- Assumed office 24 September 2018
- Preceded by: Donald Arseneault

Member of Parliament for Restigouche—Chaleur Restigouche (1988-1993)
- In office 21 November 1988 – 2 June 1997
- Preceded by: Albert Girard
- Succeeded by: Jean F. Dubé

Personal details
- Born: 11 May 1952 (age 73) Dalhousie, New Brunswick
- Party: Liberal
- Profession: Teacher

Guy H. Arseneault (born 11 May 1952 in Dalhousie, New Brunswick) is a Canadian politician who has served as a member of the Legislative Assembly of New Brunswick since 2018. He was previously a member of the House of Commons of Canada from 1988 to 1997. He was a teacher by career.

== Early life and career ==
Arsenault graduated from Dalhousie Regional High School as well as St. Thomas University. Prior to entering politics, he served as a teacher and principal. Additionally, Arsenault would serve as both Vice-President and President of the New Brunswick Teachers' Association between 2013-2017.

== Politics ==
Arseneault won election for the Liberal party in the 1988 and 1993 federal elections. His riding was the Restigouche electoral district, renamed in 1989 to Restigouche-Chaleur. Arseneault therefore served in the 34th and 35th Canadian Parliaments.

For the 1997 federal election, the ridings were restructured, and this time Arseneault campaigned at the Madawaska—Restigouche electoral district. However, Progressive Conservative candidate Jean F. Dubé won the riding. Arseneault left federal politics after this defeat.

On 9 June 2018, Arseneault became the official Liberal candidate for the 2018 New Brunswick provincial election held on 24 September in the riding of Campbellton-Dalhousie, which he won. He was re-elected in the 2020 provincial election. As of September 8, 2024, he serves as the Official Opposition House Leader and critic for Military Affairs, Regional Development Corporation, and Aboriginal Affairs.

In the 2024 New Brunswick general election he was elected in Restigouche East.

== Electoral record ==
=== Restigouche East ===
2024 New Brunswick general election: Restigouche East
Party	Candidate	Votes	%	±%
Liberal	Guy Arseneault	3,590	53.2%	-13.7
Progressive Conservative	Normand Pelletier	2,271	33.6%	+16.7
New Democratic	Daisy Petersen	501	7.4%	
Green	Gilles Cormier	389	5.8%	-10.1
Total valid votes		6,751		
Total rejected ballots				
Turnout				
Eligible voters				
Liberal hold		Swing		
Source: Elections New Brunswick

=== Campbellton-Dalhousie ===
2020 New Brunswick general election
Party	Candidate	Votes	%	±%
Liberal	Guy Arseneault	4,540	65.20	+14.91
Progressive Conservative	Charles Stewart	1,369	19.66	-4.15
Green	Marie-Christine Allard	1,054	15.14	+6.53
Total valid votes		6,963	100.00	
Total rejected ballots		42	0.60	-0.06
Turnout		7,005	64.29	-2.63
Eligible voters		10,896		
Liberal hold		Swing		+9.53
Source: Elections New Brunswick

2018 New Brunswick general election
Party	Candidate	Votes	%	±%
Liberal	Guy Arseneault	3,720	50.29%	-11.96%
Progressive Conservative	Diane Cyr	1,761	23.81%	-0.46%
New Democratic	Thérèse Tremblay	721	9.75%	-0.09%
Green	Annie Thériault	637	8.61%	+4.97%
People's Alliance	Robert Boudreau	558	7.54%	
Total valid votes		7,397	99.34%	
Total rejected ballots		49	0.66%	+0.03%
Turnout		7,446	67.57	+0.64%
Eligible voters		11,127		
Liberal hold		Swing		-5.75%
Source: Elections NB

=== Madawaska-Restigouche ===
1997 Canadian federal election: Madawaska—Restigouche
Party	Candidate	Votes	%
Progressive Conservative	Jean F. Dubé	20,343	50.30
Liberal	Guy Arseneault	14,957	36.98
New Democratic	André Carrier	4,211	10.41
Natural Law	Laurent Maltais	933	2.31
Total valid votes		40,444	100.00

=== Restigouche-Chaleur ===
1997 Canadian federal election
Party	Candidate	Votes	%
Progressive Conservative	Jean F. Dubé	20,343	50.30%
Liberal	Guy Arseneault	14,957	36.98%
New Democratic	André Carrier	4,211	10.41%
Natural Law	Laurent Maltais	933	2.31%
Total valid votes		40,444	100.00%

=== Restigouche ===
1988 Canadian federal election
Party	Candidate	Votes	%	±%
Liberal	Guy Arseneault	15,252	49.38%	+9.69%
Progressive Conservative	Al Girard	12,366	40.03%	-5.62%
New Democratic	Nancey Quigley	3,272	10.59%	-4.07%
Total valid votes		30,890		
