= Carleton-sur-Mer =

- City
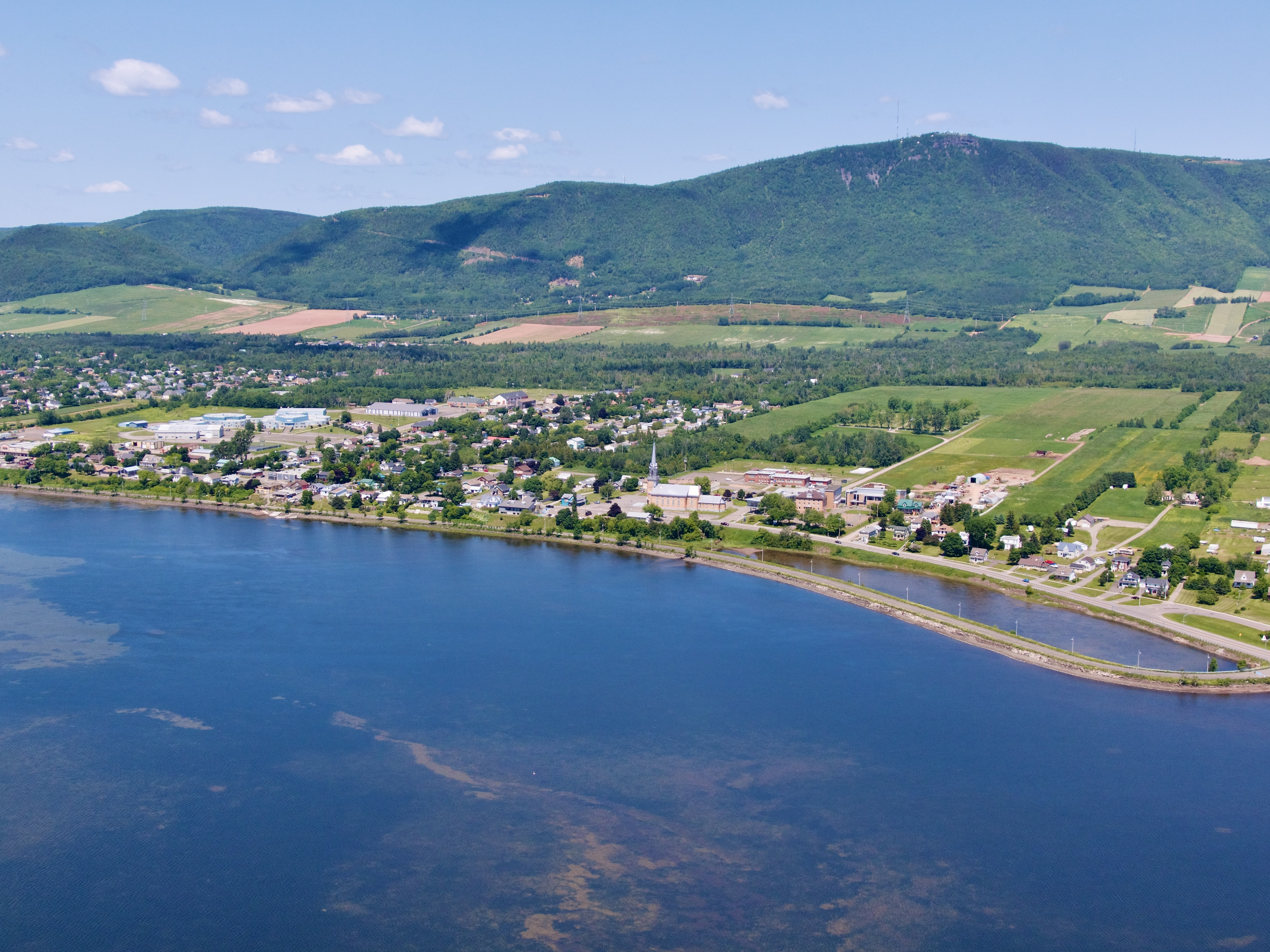
- Carleton-sur-Mer with Mont Saint-Joseph in the background

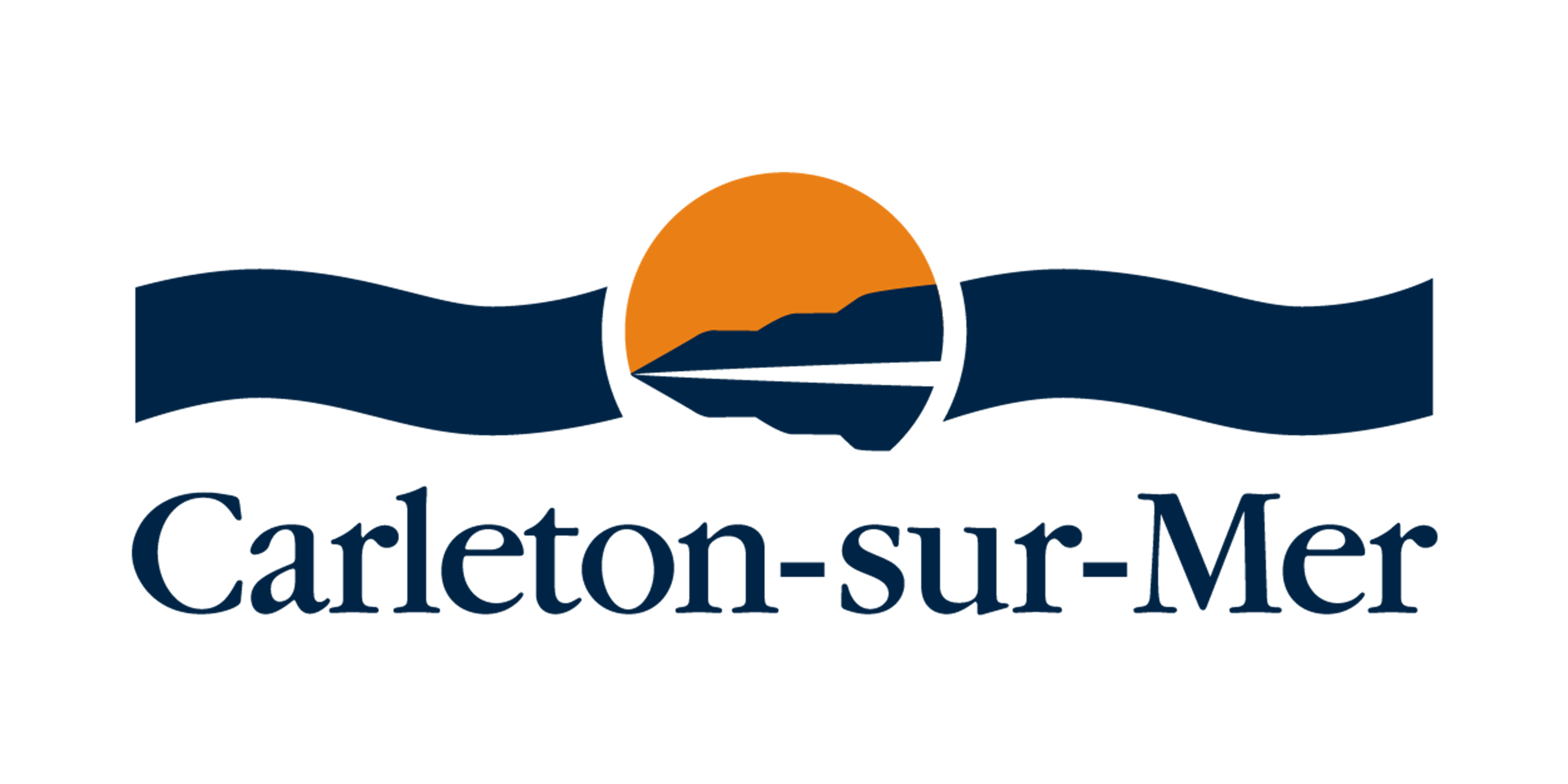
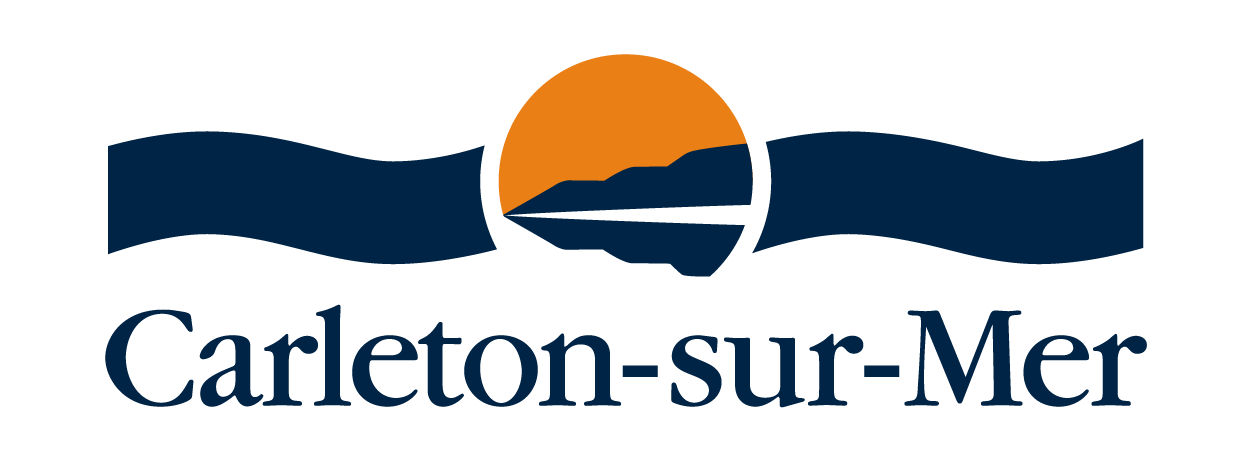
- Flag Seal

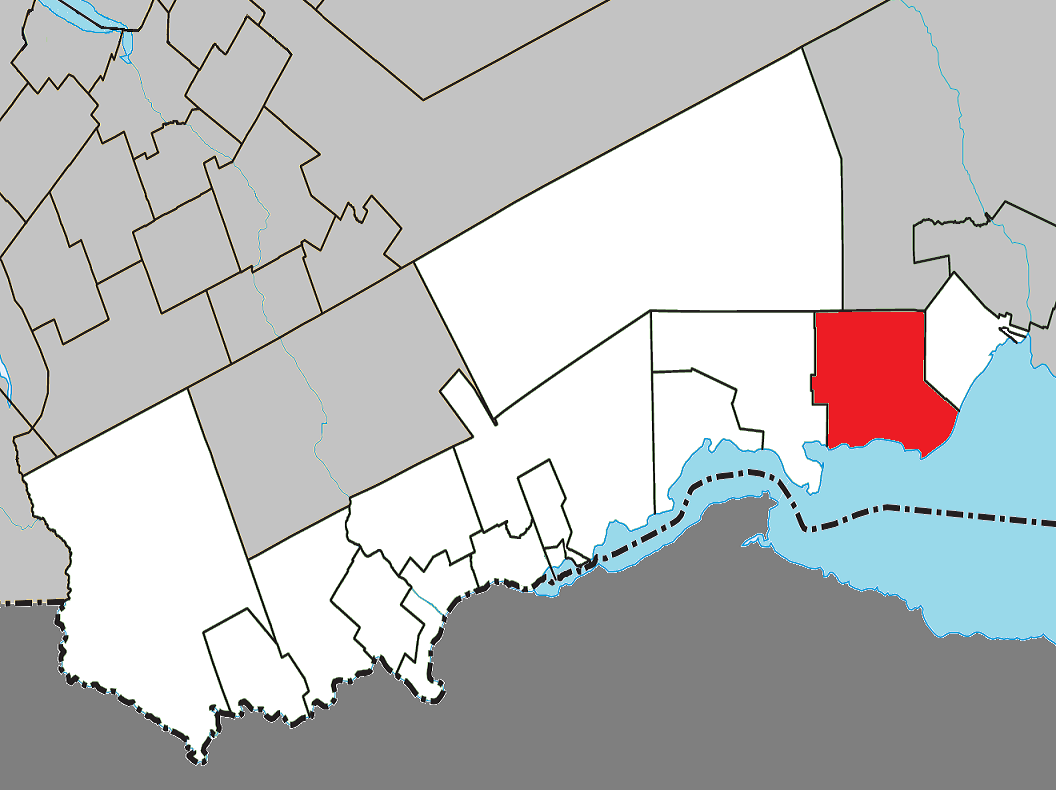
- Location within Avignon RCM

- Location in eastern Quebec Carleton-sur-Mer (Canada)
- Coordinates: 48°06′N 66°08′W
- Country: Canada
- Province: Quebec
- Region: Gaspésie– Îles-de-la-Madeleine
- RCM: Avignon
- Settled: 1756
- Constituted: October 4, 2000

Government
  - Mayor: Mathieu Lapointe
  - Federal riding: Gaspésie—Les Îles-de-la-Madeleine—Listuguj
  - Prov. riding: Bonaventure

Area
  - City: 245.89 km^{2} (94.94 sq mi)
  - Land: 221.48 km^{2} (85.51 sq mi)
  - Urban: 1.03 km^{2} (0.40 sq mi)

Population (2021)
  - City: 4,081
  - Density: 18.4/km^{2} (48/sq mi)
  - Urban: 1,198
  - Urban density: 1,166.6/km^{2} (3,021/sq mi)
  - Pop (2016-21): ▲0.2%
  - Dwellings: 2,222
- Demonyms: Carletonnais, Carletonnaise
- Time zone: UTC−5 (EST)
  - Summer (DST): UTC−4 (EDT)
- Postal code(s): G0C 1J0
- Area codes: 418 and 581
- Highways: R-132
- Website: carletonsurmer.com

Carleton-sur-Mer (French pronunciation: [kaʁlətən syʁ mɛʁ]) is the fifth largest town of the Gaspésie's south shore, in southeastern Quebec, Canada, located on Route 132, along Chaleur Bay. It is the seat of the Avignon Regional County Municipality.

The town's territory includes the communities of Biron, Caps-de-Maria, Carleton, Robitaille, and Saint-Omer.

== History ==
The current City of Carleton-sur-Mer was created on October 4, 2000, when the town of Carleton and the parish municipality of Saint-Omer were merged. It was originally called Carleton–Saint-Omer, but renamed to Carleton-sur-Mer in 2005.

=== Tracadigash/Carleton ===
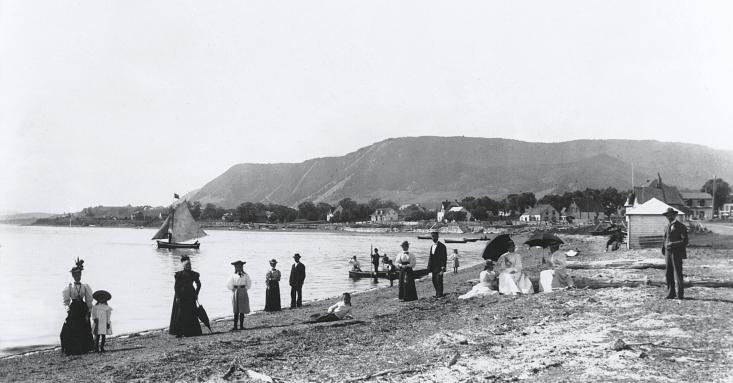
Carleton, Gaspé, about 1897

Around 1756, seven families of exiled Acadians arrived in Tracadigash from Bonaventure and Restigouche, following their deportation from Beaubassin, Nova-Scotia, in 1755. Charles Dugas and Benjamin LeBlanc (both from Grand Pré) were the original founders. In 1772, Abbé Joseph-Mathurin Bourg, the first accredited Acadian priest, arrived from Quebec City. He conducted the very first census of Tragadigash (recensement Tracadigache 1777) where he listed the following family names: Allard, Allain, Arseneau, Aubertin, Barriot, Bergeron, Berthelot, Boudreau, Bujold, Comeau, Cormier, Dugas, Francis, Landry, Leblanc, Poirier, Richard; totalling 177 persons. A, later, three-page correspondence to the governor, dated 7 April 1784, described land use "Endorsed: A list of the inhabitants of Tracadigache and the quantity of land each inhabitant has improved" which averaged 3 to 12 arpents per man.

In 1787, American Loyalists found their way to Tracadigash which eventually resulted in the parish changing its name from Saint-Joseph de Tracadièche (Tracadièche is the French spelling of Tragadigash) to Saint-Joseph de Carleton in honour of General Guy Carleton.

On October 4, 2000, the municipalities of Carleton and Saint-Omer were reunited after 100 years of separation and the new town thus formed was called Carleton–Saint-Omer. On May 7, 2005, the name was officially changed to Carleton-sur-Mer.

=== Saint-Omer ===
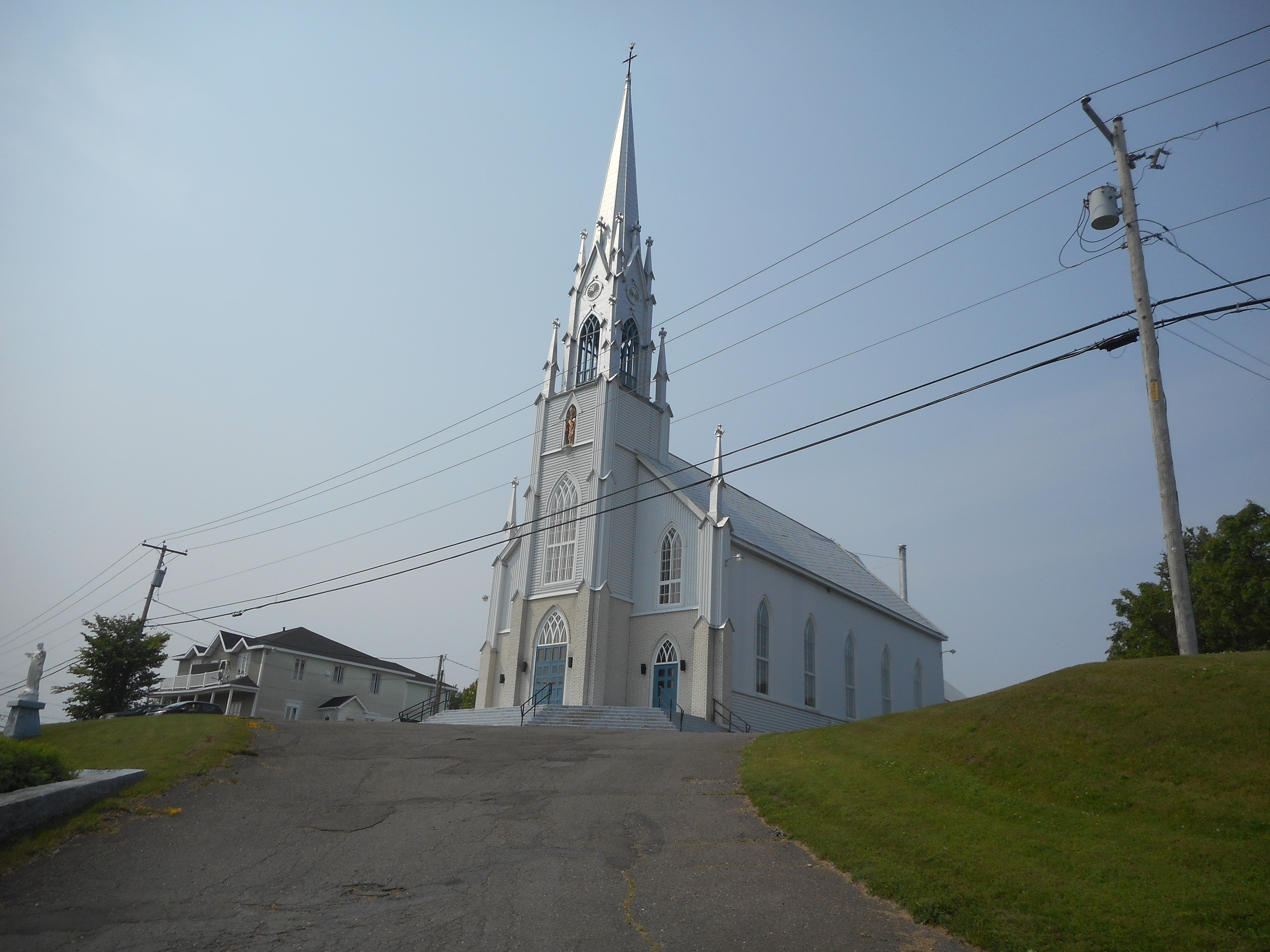
Saint-Omer Church

After the arrival of the first Acadians in 1756, the territory of Saint-Omer was included in the Parish of Saint Joseph de Tracadièche and had a common history with Carleton. As more of the population shifted west, numbers eventually justified creating a new parish, and the Parish of Saint-Omer was finally approved by the government in 1902.

For 100 years, Saint-Omer functioned as a distinct parish and municipality. Its economy depended largely on fishing, agriculture and forestry. Saint-Omer had its own elementary schools, but its teenagers attended Carleton's École Polyvalente (renamed École Antoine-Bernard in 1983).

On October 4, 2000, the municipalities of Saint-Omer and Carleton were united to form Carleton-Saint-Omer.

=== Saint-Louis de Gonzague ===
The small agricultural and forestry village of Saint-Louis de Gonzague, 8 kilometres (5.0 mi) north of Saint-Omer, was established in 1864 by the Government of Quebec to encourage economic development. The Biron section was shut down by the Quebec government in 1972. Five people remained residents of the village to work the land. In 2002, the Gaspé union paysanne held its yearly Fête de l'union paysanne gaspésienne there.

== Demographics ==
Historical Census Data - Carleton-sur-Mer
Year	Pop.	±%
2001	4,010	—
2006	4,077	+1.7%
2011	3,991	−2.1%
2016	4,073	+2.1%
2021	4,081	+0.2%
Source: Statistics Canada

In the 2021 Census of Population conducted by Statistics Canada, Carleton-sur-Mer had a population of 4,081 living in 2,016 of its 2,222 total private dwellings, a change of 0.2% from its 2016 population of 4,073. With a land area of 221.48 km^{2} (85.51 sq mi), it had a population density of 18.4/km^{2} (47.7/sq mi) in 2021.

Canada census – Carleton-sur-Mer community profile

	2021	2016	2011
Population	4,081 (+0.2% from 2016)	4,073 (+2.1% from 2011)	3991 (-2.1% from 2006)
Land area	221.48 km^{2} (85.51 sq mi)	221.42 km^{2} (85.49 sq mi)	221.38 km^{2} (85.48 sq mi)
Population density	18.4/km^{2} (48/sq mi)	18.4/km^{2} (48/sq mi)	18.0/km^{2} (47/sq mi)
Median age	52.8 (M: 52.4, F: 54.0)	50.7 (M: 50.1, F: 51.2)	48.6 (M: 48.4, F: 48.9)
Private dwellings	2,222 (total) 2,016 (occupied)	2,136 (total)	2120 (total)
Median household income	$62,800	$55,424	$44,424

References: 2021 2016 2011

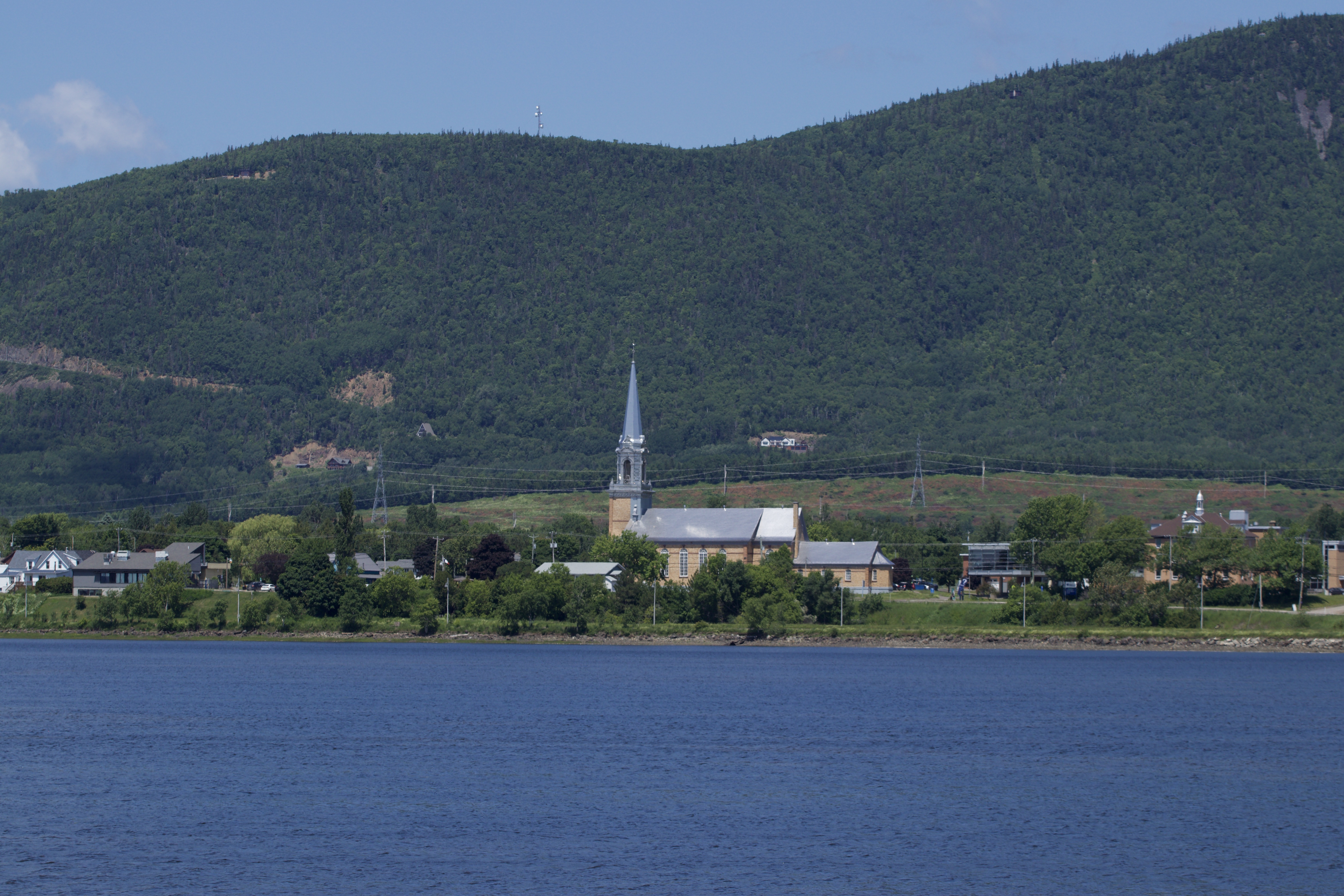
Carleton-sur-Mer

Mother tongue:

- English as first language: 1.2%
- French as first language: 97.2%
- English and French as first language: 1%
- Other as first language: 0.5%

== Economy ==
Carleton's economy relied historically mostly on agriculture, fishing and forest products. The deep water wharf allowed for large international vessels to load lumber. Tourism was, from the very beginnings, a significant aspect of the economy due in large part to its beaches and warm water temperature.

Today, tourism has grown greatly and the economy has transformed to the point that tertiary sector jobs now represent 74% of the job market.

The Carleton Wind Farm was commissioned in 2008 and is contributing electricity to Hydro-Québec's grid.

== Arts and culture ==
- The École Antoine Bernard high school and its students were the subject of the 2014 documentary film, Guidelines.
- The bilingual singer/songwriter Kevin Parent went to high school here at École Antoine-Bernard
- TVA affiliate CHAU-DT

== Government ==
The current mayor of Carleton-sur-Mer is Mathieu Lapointe. The mayor and a six-member city council are the elected officials of the municipality.

As of 2021 the council consists of:

- Mayor: Mathieu Lapointe
- Councillors:
  - 1: Régis Leblanc
  - 2: Esteban Figueroa
  - 3: Jean-Simon Landry
  - 4: Alain Turcotte
  - 5: Sylvie Tremblay
  - 6: Denise Leblanc

List of former mayors since formation of current city:

- Marc Tétreault (2000–2005)
- Michel Lacroix (2005–2009)
- Denis Henry (2009–2017)
- Mathieu Lapointe (2017–present)

== Education ==
- Commission scolaire René-Lévesque (used to be Commission scolaire Tracadièche, from the Mi'kma "Place of many herons")
- Elementary schools: École Bourg, École des Audomarois
- High school: École Antoine-Bernard de Carleton
- College: Centre d'études collégiales de Carleton (Collège de la Gaspésie et des Îles)
- Continuing education: Groupe Collégia
- University: Université du Québec à Rimouski

== Notable people ==
- Eudore Allard (1915-2001), politician
- Joseph-Guillaume Barthe (1816-1893), lawyer, journalist, poet and political figure
- Arthur Beauchesne (1876-1959), civil servant
- Marie-Christine Bernard (1966-), educator and award-winning writer
- Edèse J. Bujold (1919-2001), politician
- Jean-François Caissy (1977-), documentary filmmaker
- William Henry Clapperton (1839-1922), politician
- Henri Diotte (1874-1945), politician
- Philibert LeBlanc (1890-1964), politician
- Valmont Martin (1875-1935), physician and politician
- Pat the White (1975-), musician
- Joseph-Rémi Vallières de Saint-Réal (1787-1847), lawyer, judge and political figure

== See also ==
- List of cities in Quebec

== Sources ==
- Répertoire des municipalités du Québec
- Commission de toponymie du Québec
- Affaires municipales et régions - cartes régionales
- MARTIN, Paul-Louis (1944-); ROUSSEAU, Gilles
- La Mémoire du Québec en ligne: dictionnaire des noms propres du Québec
