= Saint-Omer, Gaspésie–Îles-de-la-Madeleine, Quebec =

Coordinates: 48°06′45″N 66°13′30″W

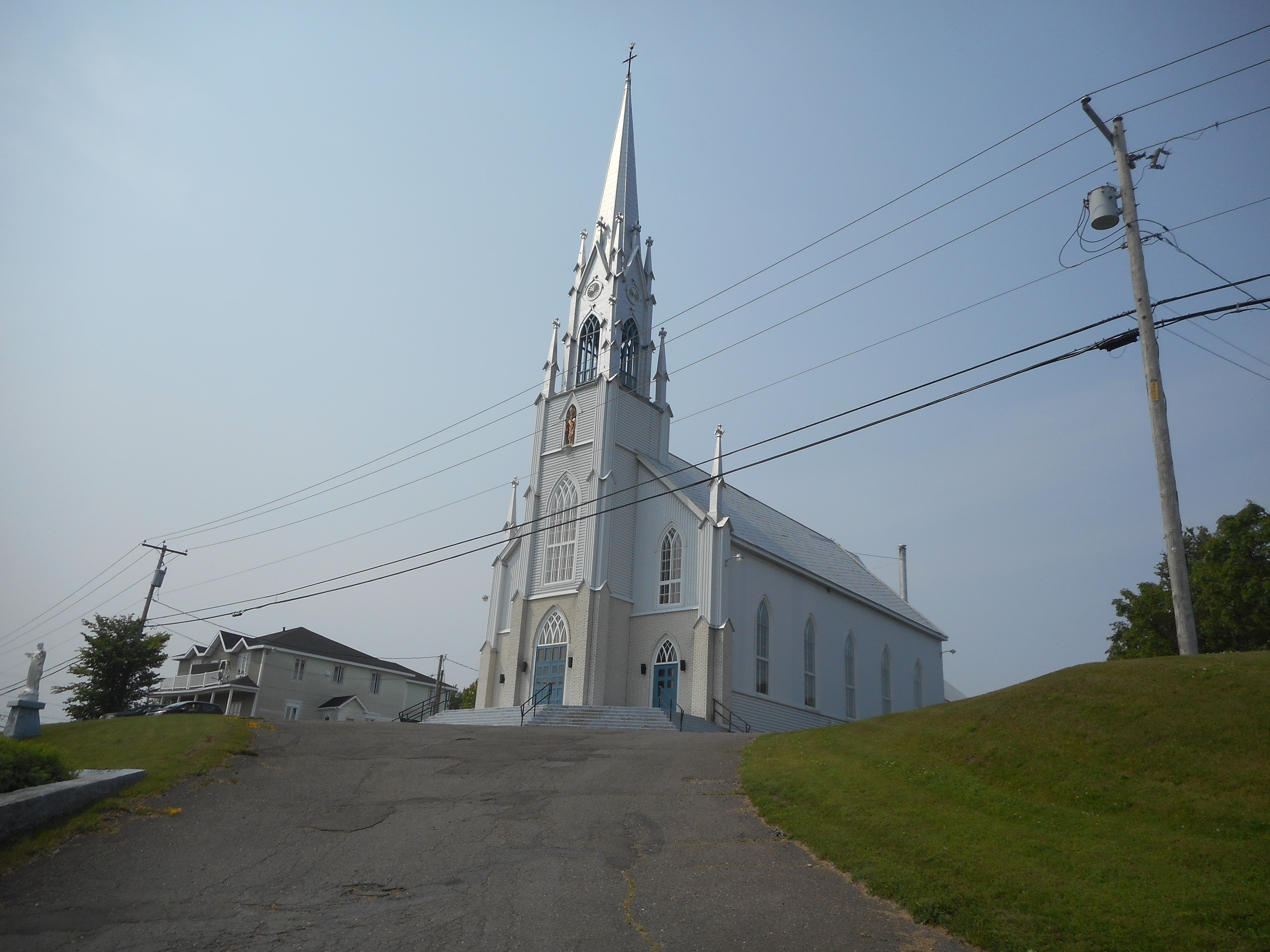
Saint-Omer Church in July 2015

Saint-Omer was a former parish municipality in the Gaspésie–Îles-de-la-Madeleine region of Quebec, Canada, until October 3, 2000.

On October 4, 2000, it merged with the town of Carleton to create the new city of Carleton–Saint-Omer, which was renamed to Carleton-sur-Mer on May 7, 2005.

It is the site of the Saint-Omer Bird Sanctuary.
