= Restigouche (federal electoral district) =

Former federal electoral district in New Brunswick, Canada

New Brunswick electoral district

Defunct federal electoral district
- Legislature: House of Commons
- District created: 1867, 1966
- District abolished: 1914, 1996
- First contested: 1867
- Last contested: 1993

Restigouche (also known as Restigouche—Chaleur) was a federal electoral district in New Brunswick, Canada, that was represented in the House of Commons of Canada from 1867 to 1917 and from 1968 to 1997.

It was created by the British North America Act 1867. It consisted of the County of Restigouche. It was abolished in 1914 when it was merged into Restigouche—Madawaska riding.

It was re-created in 1966 from Restigouche—Madawaska, consisting of the county of Restigouche and the parish of Beresford in the county of Gloucester. It was renamed "Restigouche—Chaleur" in 1989. The riding was abolished in 1996 when it was merged into Madawaska—Restigouche.

== Members of Parliament ==
This riding elected the following members of Parliament:

Parliament	Years	Member	Party
Restigouche
1st	1867–1868	John McMillan	Liberal
1st	1868–1870	William Murray Caldwell	Liberal
1st	1870–1872	George Moffat Sr.	Conservative
2nd	1872–1874	George Moffat Sr.	Conservative
3rd	1874–1877	George Moffat Sr.	Conservative
3rd	1878–1878	George Haddow	Independent
4th	1878–1882	George Haddow	Independent
5th	1882–1887	Robert Moffat	Conservative
6th	1887–1887	Robert Moffat	Conservative
6th	1887–1891	George Moffat Jr.	Conservative
7th	1891–1896	John McAlister	Liberal–Conservative
8th	1896–1900	John McAlister	Liberal–Conservative
9th	1900–1904	James Reid	Liberal
10th	1904–1908	James Reid	Liberal
11th	1908–1911	James Reid	Liberal
12th	1911–1915	James Reid	Liberal
Riding dissolved into Restigouche—Madawaska
Riding re-created from Restigouche—Madawaska
28th	1968–1972	Jean-Eudes Dubé	Liberal
29th	1972–1974	Jean-Eudes Dubé	Liberal
30th	1974–1975	Jean-Eudes Dubé	Liberal
30th	1975–1979	Maurice Harquail	Liberal
31st	1979–1980	Maurice Harquail	Liberal
32nd	1980–1984	Maurice Harquail	Liberal
33rd	1984–1988	Albert Girard	Progressive Conservative
34th	1988–1993	Guy Arseneault	Liberal
Restigouche—Chaleur
35th	1993–1997	Guy Arseneault	Liberal
Riding dissolved into Madawaska—Restigouche

== Election results ==
=== Restigouche—Chaleur, 1993–1997 ===
1993 Canadian federal election
Party	Candidate	Votes	%	±%
Liberal	Guy Arseneault	21,008	70.5	+21.1
Progressive Conservative	Bruce MacIntosh	5,913	19.8	-20.2
New Democratic	Nancy Quigley	2,051	6.9	-3.7
Natural Law	Laurent Maltais	824	2.8	New
Total valid votes		29,796	100.00	
Liberal hold		Swing		+20.65

=== Restigouche, 1968–1993 ===
1988 Canadian federal election
Party	Candidate	Votes	%	±%
Liberal	Guy Arseneault	15,252	49.4	+9.7
Progressive Conservative	Al Girard	12,366	40.0	-5.6
New Democratic Party	Nancy Quigley	3,272	10.6	-4.1
Total		30,890		

1984 Canadian federal election
Party	Candidate	Votes	%	±%
Progressive Conservative	Al Girard	14,089	45.6	+26.7
Liberal	Maurice Harquail	12,250	39.7	-21.6
New Democratic Party	Gilles Halley	4,526	14.7	-1.8
Total		30,865		

1980 Canadian federal election
Party	Candidate	Votes	%	±%
Liberal	Maurice Harquail	16,560	61.3	+5.4
Progressive Conservative	D. Bennett MacDonald	5,119	18.9	-6.5
New Democratic Party	Aurele Ferlatte	4,457	16.5	-1.3
Rhinoceros	Arthur Doucet	692	2.6	+2.6
Independent	André Dumont	207	0.8	+0.8
Total		27,035		
lop.parl.ca

1979 Canadian federal election
Party	Candidate	Votes	%	±%
Liberal	Maurice Harquail	14,840	55.9	+4.3
Progressive Conservative	J. Roger Pichette	7,009	26.4	-7.7
New Democratic Party	Gail Walsh	4,718	17.8	+10.0
Total		26,567		

By-election, October 14, 1975
Party	Candidate	Votes	%	±%
Liberal	Maurice Harquail	9,158	51.6	-3.9
Progressive Conservative	Roger Caron	6,059	34.1	+13.2
New Democratic Party	Edgar Dugas	1,392	7.8	-2.3
Social Credit	Laurence Audet	1,140	6.4	-7.2
Total		17,749		

1974 Canadian federal election
Party	Candidate	Votes	%	±%
Liberal	Jean-Eudes Dubé	12,492	55.5	+6.8
Progressive Conservative	Guy Laviolette	4,695	20.9	-1.9
Social Credit	Benoit Castonguay	3,053	13.6	+13.6
New Democratic Party	Edgar Dugas	2,262	10.1	+5.5
Total		22,502		

1972 Canadian federal election
Party	Candidate	Votes	%	±%
Liberal	Jean-Eudes Dubé	11,650	48.7	-2.4
Independent	Alexander Sandy MacLean	5,698	23.8	+23.8
Progressive Conservative	Guy Laviolette	5,450	22.8	-13.2
New Democratic Party	Edgar Dugas	1,110	4.6	+0.8
Total		23,908		

1968 Canadian federal election
Party	Candidate	Votes	%	±%
Liberal	Jean-Eudes Dubé	9,991	51.1	*
Progressive Conservative	Hector Arseneault	7,049	36.0	*
Ralliement créditiste	André Boudreau	1,769	9.0	*
New Democratic Party	Bruce Peacock	748	3.8	*
Total		19,557		

=== Restigouche, 1867–1917 ===
1911 Canadian federal election
Party	Candidate	Votes
Liberal	James Reid	1,512
Conservative	William Scott Montgomery	1,170

1908 Canadian federal election
Party	Candidate	Votes
Liberal	James Reid	1,256
Conservative	William Albert Mott	1,123

1904 Canadian federal election
Party	Candidate	Votes
Liberal	James Reid	1,274
Conservative	Wm. Albert Mott	836

1900 Canadian federal election
Party	Candidate	Votes
Liberal	James Reid	1,221
Conservative	John McAllister	744

1896 Canadian federal election
Party	Candidate	Votes
Liberal–Conservative	John McAlister	794
Liberal	G. Hadow	750

1891 Canadian federal election
Party	Candidate	Votes
Liberal–Conservative	John McAlister	735
Conservative	George Moffat Jr.	519

By-election: On Mr. Moffatt's death, 25 April 1887

By-election on 21 May 1887
Party	Candidate	Votes
Conservative	George Moffat Jr.	acclaimed

1887 Canadian federal election
Party	Candidate	Votes
Conservative	Robert Moffat	420
Independent	George Haddow	293
Unknown	J. McAlister	277

1882 Canadian federal election
Party	Candidate	Votes
Conservative	Robert Moffat	452
Unknown	J. McAlister	181
Independent	George Haddow	135
Unknown	D. Ritchie	88

1878 Canadian federal election
Party	Candidate	Votes
Independent	George Haddow	acclaimed

By-election: On Mr. Moffatt's resignation, Dec. 1877

By-election on 12 January 1878
Party	Candidate	Votes
Independent	George Haddow	acclaimed

1874 Canadian federal election
Party	Candidate	Votes
Conservative	George Moffat Sr.	acclaimed
Source: lop.parl.ca

1872 Canadian federal election
Party	Candidate	Votes
Conservative	George Moffat Sr.	593
Unknown	A. McKenzie	144
Unknown	J.C. Barberie	25
Source: Canadian Elections Database

By-election: On Mr. Caldwell's death, 29 September 1870

By-election on 29 November 1870
Party	Candidate	Votes
Conservative	George Moffat Sr.	411
Unknown	Alexander Campbell DesBrisay	233

By-election: On Mr. McMillan being appointed Inspector of Post Offices in New Brunswick, and on his subsequent resignation

By-election on 13 March 1868
Party	Candidate	Votes
Liberal	William Murray Caldwell	353
Conservative	George Moffat Sr.	306

1867 Canadian federal election
Party	Candidate	Votes
Liberal	John McMillan	370
Unknown	John Phillips	259
Source: Canadian Elections Database

== See also ==
- List of Canadian electoral districts
- Historical federal electoral districts of Canada
