= James Reid (New Brunswick politician) =

Canadian politician

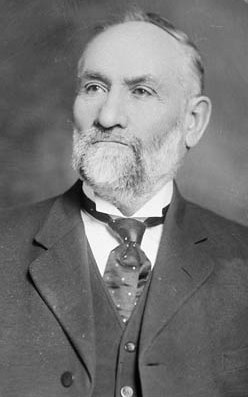

Member of the Canadian Parliament for Restigouche
- In office 1900–1915
- Preceded by: John McAlister
- Succeeded by: District was abolished in 1914

Personal details
- Born: November 14, 1839 Charlo Station, New Brunswick, Canada
- Died: November 15, 1915 (aged 76)
- Party: Liberal

James Reid (November 14, 1839 – November 15, 1915) was a Canadian politician.

Born in Charlo, New Brunswick, Reid worked as a lumber merchant prior to his political career. He married Elizabeth Mary McNair in 1872, with whom he had four children. He was elected to the House of Commons of Canada for Restigouche in the 1900 federal election. A Liberal, Reid was re-elected in 1904, 1908, and 1911. He died while in office in 1915.
