= Albert Girard (politician) =

Canadian politician (born 1949)

Albert Girard (born 18 August 1949) was a Canadian businessman and politician. Girard was a Progressive Conservative party member of the House of Commons of Canada.

Born in Saint John, New Brunswick, Girard represented New Brunswick's Restigouche riding since winning that seat in the 1984 federal election. He served in the 33rd Canadian Parliament before being defeated in the 1988 federal election by Guy Arseneault of the Liberal party.

1988 Canadian federal election: Restigouche
Party	Candidate	Votes	%	±%
Liberal	Guy Arseneault	15,252	49.4	+9.7
Progressive Conservative	Al Girard	12,366	40.0	-5.6
New Democratic Party	Nancy Quigley	3,272	10.6	-4.1
Total		30,890		

1984 Canadian federal election: Restigouche
Party	Candidate	Votes	%	±%
Progressive Conservative	Al Girard	14,089	45.6	+26.7
Liberal	Maurice Harquail	12,250	39.7	-21.6
New Democratic Party	Gilles Halley	4,526	14.7	-1.8
Total		30,865		
