= Robert Moffat (politician) =

Canadian politician

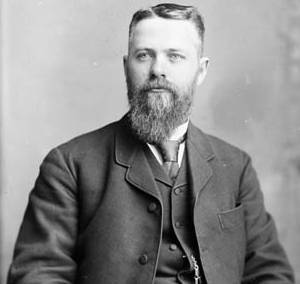
Robert Moffat Source: Library and Archives Canada

Robert Moffat (March 5, 1844 – April 25, 1887) was a businessman and political figure in New Brunswick, Canada. He represented Restigouche in the House of Commons of Canada as a Conservative member from 1883 to 1887.

He was born in Campbellton, New Brunswick in 1844, the son of George Moffat, and was educated at the Academy at Annan in Scotland. Moffatt became a merchant in Dalhousie, New Brunswick. In 1876, he married Margaret Sadler. He died in Teeswater, Ontario in 1887 while still in office and his brother George was elected to replace him in the House of Commons.
