= Joffre Daigle =

Canadian politician

J. M. Joffre Daigle

Member of the Legislative Assembly of New Brunswick
- In office 1967–1968
- Constituency: Restigouche

Personal details
- Born: July 24, 1925 Edmundston, New Brunswick
- Died: September 9, 1968 (aged 43) Dalhousie, New Brunswick
- Party: New Brunswick Liberal Association
- Spouse: Marie Estelle Plourde
- Children: 7
- Occupation: physician

Joseph Maxime Joffre Daigle (July 24, 1925 – September 9, 1968) was a Canadian politician. He served in the Legislative Assembly of New Brunswick from 1967 to 1968 as member of the Liberal party.
