= George Moffat Jr. =

Canadian politician

George Moffat (1848 – 17 September 1918) was a New Brunswick businessman and political figure. He represented Restigouche in the House of Commons of Canada as a Conservative member from 1887 to 1891.

He was born in Campbellton, New Brunswick in 1848, the son of George Moffat, and was educated there. Moffat became a merchant in Dalhousie. In 1881, he married a Miss Wilkinson. He was elected to the House of Commons by acclamation in an 1887 by-election following the death of his brother Robert.
