= Thomas F. Kenny =

19th-century Canadian politician

Thomas Francis Kenny (March 25, 1847 – ) was a tanner and political figure in New Brunswick, Canada. He represented Restigouche County in the Legislative Assembly of New Brunswick from 1879 to 1882 as a Liberal-Conservative member.

He was born in Bathurst, New Brunswick, the son of Michael Kenny and Ann Hughes, both Irish immigrants. In 1873, he married Helen Pritchard. Kenny served as a high school trustee for Dalhousie. In 1879, he moved to Andover where he also became involved in the sale of general merchandise.
