= George Moffat Sr. =

Canadian politician

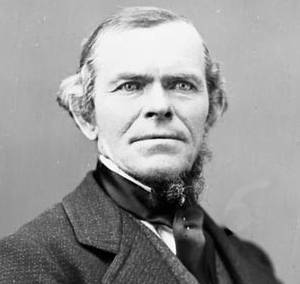
George Moffat Source: Library and Archives Canada

George Moffat (1810 – May 13, 1878) was a New Brunswick businessman and politician. He represented Restigouche in the House of Commons of Canada as a Conservative member from 1870 to 1877.

He was born in Gretna Green, Dumfriesshire, Scotland in 1810 and came to New Brunswick in 1830. He became a lumber merchant in Dalhousie, New Brunswick. Moffat was elected to the House of Commons in an 1870 by-election after the death of William Murray Caldwell. He died in Dalhousie at the age of 68.

His son Robert later represented Restigouche in the House of Commons and another son George replaced Robert in the House in 1887.
