= Maurice Harquail =

Canadian politician (born 1938)

Maurice James Harquail (born 2 December 1938 in Matapédia, Quebec) was a Liberal party member of the House of Commons of Canada. He was a claim adjuster by career.

He represented New Brunswick's Restigouche electoral district since winning a by-election there on 14 October 1975. He was re-elected in the 1979 and 1980 federal elections, but lost in the 1984 election to Al Girard of the Progressive Conservative party. Harquail served in most of the 30th Canadian Parliament, and in the 31st and 32nd Canadian Parliaments. He subsequently served as a member of the Transportation Safety Board of Canada.

1984 Canadian federal election: Restigouche
Party	Candidate	Votes	%	±%
Progressive Conservative	Al Girard	14,089	45.6	+26.7
Liberal	Maurice Harquail	12,250	39.7	-21.6
New Democratic Party	Gilles Halley	4,526	14.7	-1.8
Total		30,865		

1980 Canadian federal election: Restigouche
Party	Candidate	Votes	%	±%
Liberal	Maurice Harquail	16,560	61.3	+5.4
Progressive Conservative	D. Bennett MacDonald	5,119	18.9	-6.5
New Democratic Party	Aurele Ferlatte	4,457	16.5	-1.3
Rhinoceros	Arthur Doucet	692	2.6	+2.6
Independent	André Dumont	207	0.8	+0.8
Total		27,035		
lop.parl.ca

1979 Canadian federal election: Restigouche
Party	Candidate	Votes	%	±%
Liberal	Maurice Harquail	14,840	55.9	+4.3
Progressive Conservative	J. Roger Pichette	7,009	26.4	-7.7
New Democratic Party	Gail Walsh	4,718	17.8	+10.0
Total		26,567		

By-election, October 14, 1975
Party	Candidate	Votes	%	±%
Liberal	Maurice Harquail	9,158	51.6	-3.9
Progressive Conservative	Roger Caron	6,059	34.1	+13.2
New Democratic Party	Edgar Dugas	1,392	7.8	-2.3
Social Credit	Laurence Audet	1,140	6.4	-7.2
Total		17,749		
