= 1998 New Brunswick Liberal Association leadership election =

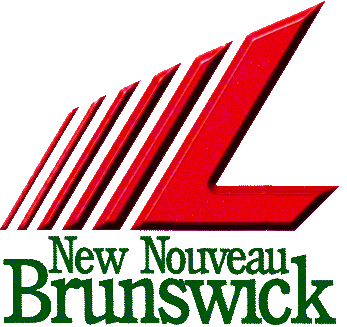
- Date: May 2, 1998
- Convention: Saint John
- Resigning leader: Frank McKenna
- Won by: Camille Thériault
- Ballots: 1
- Candidates: 3

The New Brunswick Liberal Association held a leadership election in 1998 to replace former leader and premier Frank McKenna. The elected leader would become Premier of New Brunswick, replacing the interim leader of the Liberals Ray Frenette. Camille Thériault defeated rivals Greg Byrne and Bernard Richard on the first ballot of the convention held in Saint John.

== Candidates ==
- Greg Byrne, MLA since 1995 and minister of state for energy and mines.
- Bernard Richard, MLA since 1991 and minister of education.
- Camille Thériault, MLA since 1987 and minister of economic development and tourism.

=== Non candidates ===
The following candidates were rumoured to be considering runs but did not enter the race.

- Edmond Blanchard, MLA since 1987 and minister of finance.
- Fernand Landry, former chief of staff to Frank McKenna.
- Peter LeBlanc, MLA since 1995 and minister of supply and services.
- Denis Losier, MLA from 1988 to 1994.
- Marcelle Mersereau, MLA since 1991 and minister of human resources development.

== Results ==
1998 Liberal leadership convention results May 2, 1998
Candidate	Votes	%
Camille Thériault	2,095	55.6
Greg Byrne	1,005	26.6
Bernard Richard	666	17.7
