= Alexander Campbell DesBrisay (politician) =

Canadian politician (1828–1873)

Alexander Campbell DesBrisay (1828 – April 8, 1873) was a French Canadian businessman and politician in the Province of New Brunswick. The son of Solomon DesBrisay and his wife, Mary Campbell, he was a descendant of Captain Théophile de la Cour DesBrisay (1671–1761), whose Huguenot family fled religious persecution in France and settled in Dublin, Ireland, before emigrating to Canada.

Alexander DesBrisay was born in Bedeque, Prince Edward Island, and educated at a public school. As an adult, he was a successful businessman in both the lumber and fishing industries. He married Janet Finnis with whom he had six sons and three daughters.

A supporter of the Province of New Brunswick joining the proposed Canadian Confederation, in the February 21, 1865, New Brunswick general election, DesBrisay was voted into office as the Confederation Party representative for Restigouche County in an election won by an Anti-Confederation Party made up of a coalition of Conservatives and Reformers led by Albert James Smith.

DesBrisay was reelected in the 1866 New Brunswick general election won by his party. On August 16, 1867, Premier Andrew Wetmore appointed him to the Cabinet as a Minister without Portfolio. He held this appointment until May 25, 1870, when the administration was reorganized under the leadership of the new Liberal-Conservative Party premier, George E. King.

He was returned to office again in the 1870 provincial election. That fall he resigned his seat in order to run in the November 25 Federal by-election for a seat in the House of Commons of Canada for the constituency of Restigouche to replace William Murray Caldwell, who had died in office. Unsuccessful in his bid for federal office, DesBrisay returned to private business but died a few years later from smallpox at Dalhousie, New Brunswick. He is buried in the Presbyterian Church Cemetery in Bathurst.
