= John McMillan (New Brunswick politician) =

Canadian politician (1816–1886)

John McMillan (August 4, 1816 – September 12, 1886) was a New Brunswick businessman and political figure. He represented Restigouche in the House of Commons of Canada as a Liberal member from 1867 to 1868.

He was born on the Isle of Arran, Scotland in 1816 and came to New Brunswick with his father in 1832. McMillan worked at the timber trade and later with a partner established a lumber firm and a general store at Campbellton. He was named a justice of the peace in 1845. In 1857, he was elected to the Legislative Assembly of New Brunswick for Restigouche County; he was reelected in 1861, 1865 and 1866. McMillan was Surveyor General from 1861 to 1865. He served as postmaster general for New Brunswick from 1866 until Confederation. He was elected to the House of Commons in 1867 but resigned in 1868 to become Inspector of Post Offices for the province.

He died in Saint John, New Brunswick in 1886.

1867 Canadian federal election: Restigouche
Party	Candidate	Votes
Liberal	John McMillan	370
Unknown	John Phillips	259
Source: Canadian Elections Database
