= List of conservative parties in Canada =

This is a list of conservative parties in Canada. There are a number of conservative parties in Canada, a country that has traditionally been dominated by two political parties, one liberal and one conservative. The span between the 2015 Newfoundland and Labrador provincial election and the 2016 Manitoba provincial election was the first time since 1943 when no party with the word "Conservative" in its name formed the government in either a province or the federal level.

== The federal conservative movement ==
=== Progressive Conservatives ===
The Progressive Conservative Party of Canada was the primary conservative party in Canada from 1942 to, at least, 1993. It was the descendant of Sir John A. Macdonald's Liberal-Conservative Party. The party had its roots in the Great Coalition of 1864 that paved the way for Canadian Confederation and was known under various names but was generally referred to unofficially as the Tories or "Conservative Party". In 1942, Liberal-Progressive Premier of Manitoba John Bracken became leader of the party, on the condition the party be named the Progressive Conservative Party of Canada.

The Conservatives, and later the Progressive Conservatives, formed the government in Canada, alternating with the Liberal Party of Canada, 1867–1873, 1878–1896, 1911–1921, 1926, 1930–1935, 1957–1963, 1979–1980 and 1984–1993. Throughout the period from the first election in 1867 to the 1993 election, the national conservative party always formed the government or the official opposition under the names "Liberal-Conservatives", "Unionists", "Conservatives" or Progressive Conservatives".

=== The demise of the Progressive Conservatives and rise of Reform ===
In 1993, the Progressive Conservatives went from majority government to holding only two of 295 seats in the House of Commons of Canada, this was the first time they had done worse than third place in the House, and only the second time they had placed worse than second (the other time being in the 1921 election): they in fact placed fifth and last in terms of parties represented in the commons behind the Liberals, the Reform Party of Canada, the Bloc Québécois and the New Democratic Party.

The Reform Party was a populist conservative party based in Western Canada which cut into traditional PC support while the Bloc was a Quebec separatist party which cut into the support of the PCs in Quebec where they traditionally won support for their decentralization stance. Reform and the PCs finished with similar popular vote totals in the 1993 and subsequent elections but, under the first past the post electoral system the Reformers won many more seats due to their strong regional support in the West versus the thin national support for the PCs across Canada.

In the 1997 election, the PCs and Reform continued to run approximately at par in popular vote and both increased their share of seats: Reform from 52 to 60 and Progressive Conservatives from two to 20. Despite this, neither rivalled the Liberals for power and the Reformers tried to "unite the right" with their United Alternative initiative. These talks were non-starters for many Progressive Conservatives who saw themselves as the national party of Sir John A. Macdonald, however the United Alternative did attract some provincial Blue Tories and renamed itself the "Canadian Reform Conservative Alliance", known publicly as the Canadian Alliance.

In the 2000 election, the PCs were reduced to 12 seats, while the new Canadian Alliance gained seats. Following the election and despite Alliance leadership troubles, the PCs were unable to make significant gains in opinion polls and former Prime Minister Joe Clark resigned as leader. Following Clark's resignation as leader, Peter Mackay was elected at the 2003 PC leadership convention. Mackay began a process of talks which led to the merger of the PCs with the Alliance and the creation of a new Conservative Party of Canada. This alienated many Red Tories, including Clark, who refused to join the new party.

=== Today's Conservative Party of Canada ===
The successful merger of the Progressive Conservatives and the Canadian Alliance was followed by moderate success in the 2004 election in which the new party won 99 of 308 seats, an increase from its total of 72 of 301 seats prior to the election and 78 seats won between the two parties in 2000. Detractors pointed to the fact, however, that the new party received 7% less in popular vote than the total of the two forerunner parties in 2000. The Liberals, however, were reduced to a minority government.

Former Canadian Alliance leader Stephen Harper had been chosen as leader of the new party just prior to the 2004 election which provided a dual handicap for the party. It did not allow the party much time to combine and consolidate the bases of the two founding parties and it allowed the Liberals to define the party as the "Alliance Conservatives", insinuating that it was the result of a hostile takeover by the Alliance which was viewed by many in Ontario, Quebec and Atlantic Canada as "too far to the right". These claims were bolstered by former PC Prime Minister Clark's lukewarm endorsement of the Liberals, having said Canadians would be best to choose "the devil you know (Liberal leader Paul Martin) than the devil you don't (Harper)".

Martin had come into office on December 12, 2003, following a long battle with his predecessor, Jean Chrétien, for control of the Liberal Party. Martin had been a very successful and popular finance minister under much of Chrétien's term and was expected to dominate politics and win a commanding majority, perhaps of record size, once he was at the helm. The merger of the conservative movement was not viewed as a large impediment to this goal when it occurred almost simultaneously with Martin's rise to power. However, the sponsorship scandal, which saw some Liberal supporters fraudulently acquire government funds, and particularly Martin's response to it caused him to slip in the polls.

During the 2004 campaign, Harper actually led in the polls for some time, but Martin launched a successful series of attack ads painting Harper as too far to the right. This campaign was actually given a boost by Harper, who began to muse about winning a majority government, when polls showed most Canadians were uncomfortable with such a prospect, and by some Conservative candidates who made statements on controversial social issues.

Harper briefly mused about giving up the leadership following the election defeat but carried forward with considerable optimism despite trailing the Liberals significantly in the polls. The Gomery Commission, which was appointed by Martin to investigate the sponsorship scandal, gave new fuel to the Conservatives. In the spring of 2005, it projected the Conservatives back into the lead in the polls and Martin held a rare live address on television to ask Canadians to give him 10 more months to govern, in which time the Gomery Commission would finish its work and release a report on its investigation, and then he would call an election. The Conservatives moved forward to defeat the government but their efforts to defeat a motion of confidence in the government were prevented by the high-profile crossing of the floor by Belinda Stronach. Stronach had finished second to Harper in the leadership race just a year before but joined the Liberals saying Harper was risking national unity by trying to defeat the government with the aid of the Bloc Québécois.

During the summer, the Conservatives slipped back in the polls again, and there were renewed questions of Harper's leadership and the potential success of the new party. One poll showed that 60% of Canadians thought Harper should resign. In the fall session of Parliament, despite trailing in opinion polls, Harper tried again to defeat the government. This time he was joined by all opposition parties and his motion of no confidence was passed on November 28, 2005.

Harper set out on a campaign focused heavily on policy, which allowed him to dominate the headlines for the first weeks of the campaign. The Liberals opted to campaign low-key until after the Christmas holiday season. By January, the Liberals began their campaign in earnest, but by this time Harper had begun to capture the minds of Canadians and the Liberals were struck by a Royal Canadian Mounted Police investigation into an income trusts scandal. The Conservatives began to take a lead in the polls, and following a strong showing in the debates among the main party leaders by Harper, the Conservatives surged into a convincing lead. The Liberals again launched a series of attack ads against Harper; however, polls showed that Canadians had grown comfortable with Harper over the course of the first few weeks in which he ran a positive campaign virtually unopposed by the Liberals.

In the 2006 election held on January 23, the Conservatives won a bare plurality of seats, besting the Liberals 124 to 103. They formed a minority government with just 40.3% of the seats in the House of Commons. The party under Harper would win the 2008 and 2011 elections before facing defeat in 2015. In 2018, sitting Conservative MP Maxime Bernier (Beauce) quit the Conservative Party to form his own right-leaning party: the People's Party of Canada. The party would later lose the 2019 and 2021 elections to the governing Liberals of Justin Trudeau. Between 2021 and 2025, the Conservatives under Pierre Poilievre began opening a wide lead against the Liberals, but it evaporated prior to the 2025 election, which was won by the Liberals of Mark Carney.

=== Unrepresented federal conservative parties ===
- The Christian Heritage Party is a religious, social conservative party
- The United Party of Canada (2024) is a Social conservative and Right-wing populist party founded in 2024.
- The Libertarian Party of Canada, like many Libertarian parties, is portrayed by many in the media as a conservative party.

== Provincial/territorial parties ==
A number of Canadian provinces still have "Progressive Conservative" parties, or parties that once used that name and remained so independently of the federal change. Each party remains the largest conservative one in its respective province.

=== Progressive Conservatives (PCs) ===
- The Manitoba PCs form the official opposition in Manitoba
- The New Brunswick PCs form the official opposition in New Brunswick
- The Newfoundland and Labrador PCs form the government in Newfoundland and Labrador
- The Nova Scotia PCs form the government in Nova Scotia
- The Ontario PCs form the government in Ontario; winning three consecutive majority governments since 2018
- The Prince Edward Island PCs form the government on the Prince Edward Island
- The Saskatchewan PCs have no seats in the Saskatchewan Legislature

The Yukon Party and the British Columbia Conservative Party both once used the name "Progressive Conservative", but changed their names. The United Conservative Party, which forms the government in Alberta, was a merger of the Progressive Conservative Association and the Wildrose Party. The Saskatchewan Party, which forms the government in Saskatchewan, was a split from the Progressive Conservative Party of Saskatchewan and the Saskatchewan Liberal Party.

=== Quebec provincial conservatives ===
In Quebec, the Union Nationale was an important conservative party that formed the government for twenty-five of the thirty-four years between 1936, when it first formed government, and 1970, when the last UN government was defeated. It was founded by a merger of the historical Conservative Party of Quebec with a small faction that had split from the Quebec Liberal Party. There have been two attempts to revive the Conservative banner in Quebec: the Progressive Conservative Party of Quebec in the 1980s and the modern Quebec Conservative Party founded in 2009. The Action démocratique du Québec was a conservative split from the Quebec Liberal Party and existed from 1994 until 2012, when it merged with the Coalition Avenir Québec (CAQ). At its peak in the 2007 Quebec election, the ADQ won over 30% of the vote and formed the official opposition. Équipe Autonomiste was formed by former ADQ supporters after its merger with the CAQ. The CAQ under leader François Legault formed government in the 2018 and 2022 general elections, before facing defeat in 2026. In the 2026 provincial election, the Quebec Conservative Party gained representation in the National Assembly.

=== Other provincial/territorial conservative parties ===
The following conservative parties have seats in provincial legislatures:

- The BC Conservatives are a governing party in British Columbia.
- The Quebec Conservatives are a conservative party in Québec.
- The Saskatchewan Party is a governing party in Saskatchewan.
- The Yukon Party is a governing party in Yukon.

=== Provincial/territorial conservative parties unrepresented in legislatures ===
- Canadians' Choice Party in Ontario.
- The Christian Heritage Party of British Columbia.
- The Équipe Autonomiste in Québec.
- The Coalition Avenir Quebec in Québec.
- The New Blue Party in Ontario.
- Nova Scotians United.
- The Saskatchewan United Party in Saskatchewan.
- The Ontario Alliance.
- The Ontario Party.
- The Ontario Provincial Confederation of Regions Party
- The People's Alliance of New Brunswick
- The Populist Party in Ontario.
- Stop the New Sex-Ed Agenda in Ontario.
- The Wildrose Independence Party in Alberta.
- The Yukon Freedom Party.

== Other conservative movements ==
The Canadian social credit movement consisted of a number of social conservative parties and organizations in Western Canada and Quebec. The most significant of these parties were the Social Credit Party of Alberta (an antecedent of the Reform Party of Canada) and the British Columbia Social Credit Party which ruled their respective provinces for decades. The Social Credit Party of Canada and the Quebec-based Ralliement créditiste were important third parties in the House of Commons of Canada for a few decades.
