= Richard Hatfield =

Canadian politician (1931–1991)

The Honourable Richard Hatfield PC ONB
- The Hon. Richard Bennett Hatfield

26th Premier of New Brunswick
- In office November 11, 1970 – October 27, 1987
- Monarch: Elizabeth II
- Lieutenant Governor: Wallace Samuel Bird; Hédard Robichaud; George Stanley; Gilbert Finn
- Preceded by: Louis Robichaud
- Succeeded by: Frank McKenna

Leader of the Progressive Conservative Party of New Brunswick
- In office October 13, 1967 – October 13, 1987
- Preceded by: Charles Van Horne
- Succeeded by: Malcolm MacLeod

MLA for Carleton Centre (Carleton; 1961–1974)
- In office June 19, 1961 – October 13, 1987
- Preceded by: Hugh John Flemming
- Succeeded by: Allison DeLong

Senator for New Brunswick
- In office September 7, 1990 – April 26, 1991
- Appointed by: Brian Mulroney

Personal details
- Born: Richard Bennett Hatfield; April 9, 1931 Hartland, New Brunswick, Canada
- Died: April 26, 1991 (aged 60) Fredericton, New Brunswick, Canada
- Party: Progressive Conservative

Richard Bennett Hatfield PC ONB (April 9, 1931 – April 26, 1991) was a Canadian politician who served as the premier of New Brunswick from 1970 to 1987. He was the longest-serving premier in New Brunswick history.

== Early life ==
The youngest of five children of Heber Hatfield and Dora Robinson, Richard was brought up with politics in the household. His father, already a well known potato shipper, was Hartland's mayor when he was born. In 1938, at 7 years old, his father brought him to the Conservative Party of Canada leadership convention in Winnipeg where he met his namesake, R. B. Bennett. In 1940 Heber was elected Victoria-Carleton county Conservative Member of Parliament and served until his death due to cancer in 1952. Young Richard spent a lot of time in Ottawa, even getting to know John Diefenbaker and his first wife Edna.

After graduating from high school in 1948 in his home town Hartland, Hatfield attended Acadia University for four years, majoring in chemistry and English, and became a member of the Sigma Chi fraternity. He also got involved in drama, an experience that seemed to have the most lasting impact of any during his years at Acadia. "That was extremely valuable" he said. "It would benefit every politician to have a bit of theatre training... too many politicians get caught up using big words to impress, but don't know how to project feelings." After Acadia, he attended Dalhousie University to become a doctor but after a year he turned to law. He graduated Dalhousie Law School in 1956.

== Early career ==
Hatfield left Halifax in 1957 and moved to Truro to take a job with the firm Patterson, Smith, Matthew and Grant so he could do his six months articling period. After successfully completing his articles, he left Truro to join Gordon Churchill who was at the time minister of industry in Ottawa. He declined a job offer at the firm and he never practised law again. He stayed in Ottawa for nine months until he called his brother Fred for a job back home. Frederick Heber Hatfield (1922–2004), who was managing the potato shipping and processing operation since Heber died, agreed and Richard became vice-president of sales. He worked with his brother until 1965. When his family sold their potato chip plant to Humpty Dumpty Snack Foods, he decided to be a politician full-time.

== Political career ==
In 1961, Hugh John Flemming left his Carleton County seat and ran successfully in the federal seat of Royal. Fred, then president of Carleton County PC Association, offered the nomination to Richard, who accepted. He ran against his brother-in-law Gerald Clark, and won easily with a majority of 1,736 votes. Years later, he recalled that his father's reputation "had helped me to be elected, and now I was on my own."

When the New Brunswick Legislature was not sitting, Hatfield sold potato chips all over the Maritimes. His first few years as an MLA were uneventful, but he spent a lot of time talking to reporters about politics in Fredericton and Montreal.

He became Leader of the Opposition and interim leader of the Progressive Conservatives after the 1967 general election and was elected party leader in 1969 after defeating former leader Charles Van Horne. He led the party to victory in the 1970 provincial election. During Hatfield's long tenure, he became prominent on the national stage by allying with Canadian prime minister Pierre Trudeau during the constitutional negotiations that led to the 1982 patriation of the Canadian constitution and the creation of the Canadian Charter of Rights and Freedoms. He also took leadership in helping create equality between the province's Francophone Acadian minority and Anglophone majority.

His attempts at attracting investment to the province and developing the economy were less successful. In the 1970s, the Hatfield government financed the manufacture of the Bricklin SV-1 in hope of creating an auto industry in the province. Although the visionary project produced an advanced sports car, huge cost overruns and poor management led to the company's demise.

=== Controversies and resignation ===
Hatfield's last years in office were plagued by personal scandal. On September 25, 1984, the RCMP found 35 grams of marijuana in his suitcase during a security check of luggage conducted before a flight from Fredericton to Moncton during a royal visit by Queen Elizabeth II. He was charged with criminal possession of marijuana on October 26. The trial was postponed when Judge James D. Harper appeared on a radio show and suggested that privileged people should receive stiffer sentences than "Joe Blow from Kokomo who is the town drunk." On January 29, 1985, Hatfield was acquitted by Judge Andrew Harrigan after a two-day trial. Harrigan sparked legal furor after he suggested that a journalist might have planted the drugs to create "the juiciest story ever to crack the media."

Several days after the acquittal, allegations emerged that Hatfield had invited four young men to an all-night party in his Fredericton home in 1981. The men accused Hatfield of giving them marijuana and of using cocaine during the evening. They also alleged that Hatfield flew them to Montreal aboard a government aircraft and put them up in a downtown hotel for the night. Hatfield denied the allegations and stated, "It is true that they were in my home together with others, some four years ago. However, they were strangers to me. Those who know me will confirm I am extremely gregarious. I meet and talk to people on the street, in the markets and the shops, in the restaurants and bars. I invite them to my house, I go to their houses. The door to my house is usually unlocked and frequently open. That is my way. I admit I am unconventional." No legal action was taken.

In the 1987 election, Hatfield's PC Party lost every seat in the legislature, a wipeout on a scale that had not been seen in Canada in over half a century. Hatfield was soundly defeated in his own riding by the Liberal, Allison DeLong, and lost by 18 points. Hatfield resigned as Premier of New Brunswick and as party leader.

== Later years and death ==
In 1990, he was appointed to the Senate of Canada by Governor General Ray Hnatyshyn, on the advice of Brian Mulroney. Soon after taking up his appointment, he was stricken with an inoperable brain tumour and died in 1991, at the age of 60. His memorial service, which was held at the Christ Church Cathedral in Fredericton, New Brunswick, was attended by Premiers and Prime Ministers, friends and opponents.

== Personal life ==
It was a widely known open secret that Hatfield was gay; in the 1978 provincial election, New Brunswick Liberal Party leader Joseph Daigle attracted criticism for a campaign speech in which he referred to Hatfield as a "faded pansy". Janet Cawley of the Chicago Tribune called him, "a flamboyant, eccentric and controversial figure with a penchant for modern art, rock and roll, and New York night life". His critics nicknamed him "Disco Dick". Despite this, he never officially came out as such during his lifetime, and his sexual orientation only began to be discussed on the record in media and biographical sources after his death. Hatfield said of his bachelor lifestyle, "the nuclear family—one wife, two kids and one dog—looks nice on Christmas cards, but they pay an awful price".

In 2019, it was alleged that during the 1940s, Hatfield fathered a child, John Hall, with Izetta "Toodie" McKeil, a young woman from Hatfield's hometown.
