= Barbara Baird Filliter =

Canadian politician

Barbara Lilian Baird, KC, (born October 1, 1952) also known as Barbara Baird-Filliter, was the first female leader of the Progressive Conservative Party in the Canadian province of New Brunswick, serving from 1989 to 1991.

She led the party during a time when it held no seats at all in the Legislative Assembly of New Brunswick, having been shut out by Frank McKenna's historic sweep of all 58 seats in the 1987 provincial election. She was replaced by Dennis Cochrane before the 1991 election, and returned to her legal practice in Fredericton.

Baird received a Bachelor of Arts and Bachelor of Laws from the University of New Brunswick in 1974 and 1976 respectively, and a Master of Laws from the London School of Economics and Political Science in 1985. She was made Queen's Counsel in December 2000, and was appointed to the Court of Queen's Bench of New Brunswick, Family Division in April 2007. In 2015, she was elevated to a Justice of the Court of Appeal of New Brunswick.( see Gnb.ca. Court of Appeal) . She is married to George Filliter, a labour lawyer and mediator, and has two daughters.

Preceded by Malcolm MacLeod	Leader of the Progressive Conservative Party of New Brunswick; 1989–1991	Succeeded by Dennis Cochrane
