= Charles Van Horne =

Canadian politician

- Van Horne in 1966

Leader of the Progressive Conservative Party of New Brunswick
- In office 1966–1967
- Preceded by: Cyril Sherwood
- Succeeded by: Richard Hatfield

Member of Parliament for Restigouche—Madawaska
- In office 1955–1961
- Preceded by: Joseph Gaspard Boucher
- Succeeded by: Edgar Fournier

Personal details
- Born: January 3, 1921
- Died: August 27, 2003 (aged 82)

Joseph Charles Van Horne (January 3, 1921 – August 27, 2003) was a politician in New Brunswick, Canada, and the leader of the Progressive Conservative Party of New Brunswick between 1966 and 1967.

A lawyer and hotel owner in the Campbellton area, Van Horne ran for the federal Progressive Conservatives in the riding of Restigouche-Madawaska in a 1955 by-election following the death of Liberal Member of Parliament Joseph Gaspard Boucher. Van Horne won the election, breaking a 22-year Liberal hold on the riding.

While in Parliament, Van Horne successfully lobbied the federal and provincial governments to build a bridge between Campbellton and Pointe-à-la-Croix, Québec. The bridge opened in October 1961 and is currently named for him.

In 1966, after the resignation of Cyril Sherwood, Van Horne successfully ran for leader of the provincial Progressive Conservative Party. In the 1967 provincial election, Liberal Premier Louis Robichaud was re-elected, and Van Horne resigned as Conservative leader. He attempted to regain the leadership at the 1969 party leadership convention but lost to Richard Hatfield.

Van Horne remained in the Legislative Assembly and served as Minister of Tourism in the Cabinet of Richard Hatfield between 1970 and 1972 when he was fired from cabinet for going over budget. In 1975, he left politics entirely after pleading guilty to accepting a bribe over the purchase of park lands and receiving a two-year suspended sentence.

== Sources ==
- Journal of the New Brunswick Legislative Assembly, December 9, 2003
- Cross, William; Stewart, Ian (January 2002). "Ethnicity and Accommodation in the New Brunswick party system". Journal of Canadian Studies. Archived from the original on 5 May 2005 – via FindArticles.
- Louis J. Robichaud: A Not So Quiet Revolution by Michel Cormier, translated by Johnathan Kaplansky. Faye Editions, 2004.
- The Right Fight: Bernard Lord and the Conservative Dilemma by Jacques Poitras. Goose Lane Editions, 2004.

New Brunswick provincial government of Richard Hatfield
Cabinet post (1)
Predecessor	Office	Successor
New portfolio	'Minister of Tourism'; 1970-1972	'Jean-Paul LeBlanc'
Other offices
Preceded by Cyril Sherwood	Leader of the New Brunswick Progressive Conservative Party; 1966-1967	Succeeded by Richard Hatfield
Preceded by Joseph Gaspard Boucher	Member of Parliament for Restigouche-Madawaska; 1955-1961	Succeeded by Edgar Fournier
