= 1970 New Brunswick general election =

Canadian provincial election

| ← 1967 | October 26, 1970 | 1974 → |

58 seats to the 47th New Brunswick Legislative Assembly 30 seats were needed for a majority
| | Majority party | Minority party | Third party |
|---|---|---|---|
| | | Lib | NDP |
| Leader | Richard Hatfield | Louis Robichaud | J. Albert Richardson |
| Party | Progressive Conservative | Liberal | New Democratic |
| Leader's seat | Carleton | Kent | Ran in Northumberland (lost) |
| Last election | 26 seats | 32 seats | 0 seats |
| Seats won | 32 | 26 | 0 |
| Seat change | ▲6 | ▼6 | Steady |
| Percentage | 48.4 | 48.6 | 2.8 |
| Swing | ▲1.3pp | ▼4.2pp | ▲2.7pp |
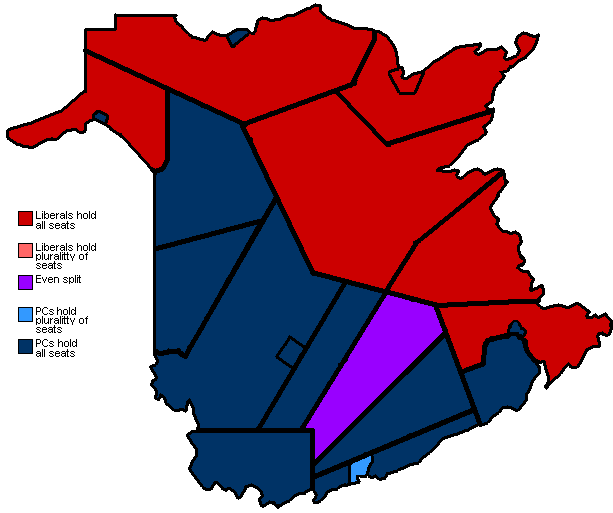
Premier before election
Louis Robichaud
Liberal
Premier after election
Richard Hatfield
Progressive Conservative

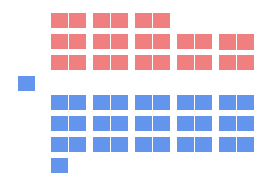
Rendition of party representation in the 47th New Brunswick Legislative Assembly decided by this election. Progressive Conservatives (32) Liberals (26)

The 1970 New Brunswick general election was held on October 26, 1970, to elect 58 members to the 47th New Brunswick Legislative Assembly, the governing house of the province of New Brunswick, Canada. It saw the Liberals defeated, and a new Conservative government take over in the Canadian Province of New Brunswick.

Louis Robichaud, the Liberal premier since 1960, called the election early by surprise. Some analysts believed Robichaud was tiring of the job of Premier, and that he had accomplished everything that he had set out to do, such as the Official Languages Act in 1969. With no willing leadership candidates ready to take over at the time, Robichaud called an election.

He had hoped that the Progressive Conservatives, led by new leader Richard Hatfield, would not be ready for a snap election, but Hatfield's platform was released two days before Robichaud's. In fact, the Liberals were forced to write their platform so rapidly that they could not get it in by the publishing deadlines for the local newspapers in which they purchased advertising space, forcing them to run blank pages. That gaffe was the major turning point in the campaign.

Meanwhile, Hatfield grew increasingly confident. He campaigned across the province in a helicopter, and analysts were surprised at the ease in which he communicated in both official languages. Although Liberals won more of the popular vote, Conservatives won a majority of the seats in the provincial legislature.

This was the first New Brunswick provincial election contested province-wide by the New Democratic Party. The party had made its first appearance in New Brunswick provincial politics in the 1967 election but ran candidates only in the district of Northumberland. The party fielded candidates in 15 out of 22 districts in the 1970 election, but failed to win any seats.

This and previous NB elections had each county as an electoral district electing a varying number of members, based on their respective populations, with multi-member districts predominating. Each voter was able to cast multiple votes - as many as the seats to fill in the district (Plurality block voting).

"New Brunswick’s counties originally provided the basis for the province’s electoral districts, an arrangement that lasted with only minor changes until 1974. Each district was assigned multiple MLAs (2-5) roughly according to population size and the presence of distinct communities inside each district. However, the boundaries of the new districts and number of seats to be assigned were assigned arbitrarily, and not without a little gerrymandering"

== Results ==
Summary of the 1970 Legislative Assembly of New Brunswick election results
| Party | Party leader | Seats | | Popular vote |
|---|---|---|---|---|
| Party | Party leader | 1967 | Elected | Popular vote |
| Progressive Conservative | Richard Hatfield | 26 | 32 | 48.4% |
| Liberal | Louis Robichaud | 32 | 26 | 48.6% |
| New Democratic | J. Albert Richardson | 0 | 0 | 2.8% |
| Other / Non-Partisan | | 0 | 0 | 0.2% |

Popular vote
| Liberal | 48.60% |
| PC | 48.40% |
| New Democratic | 2.80% |
| Others | 0.20% |

Seats summary
| PC | 55.17% |
| Liberal | 44.83% |
