= 1967 New Brunswick general election =

Canadian provincial election

← 1963	October 23, 1967	1970 →

58 seats to the 46th New Brunswick Legislative Assembly 30 seats were needed for a majority
	Majority party	Minority party
	Lib	PC
Leader	Louis Robichaud	Charles Van Horne
Party	Liberal	Progressive Conservative
Leader since	1958	1966
Leader's seat	Kent	Ran in Restigouche (lost)
Last election	32 seats	20 seats
Seats won	32	26
Seat change	0	▲6
Percentage	52.8%	47.1%
Swing	▲1.0%	▼1.1%
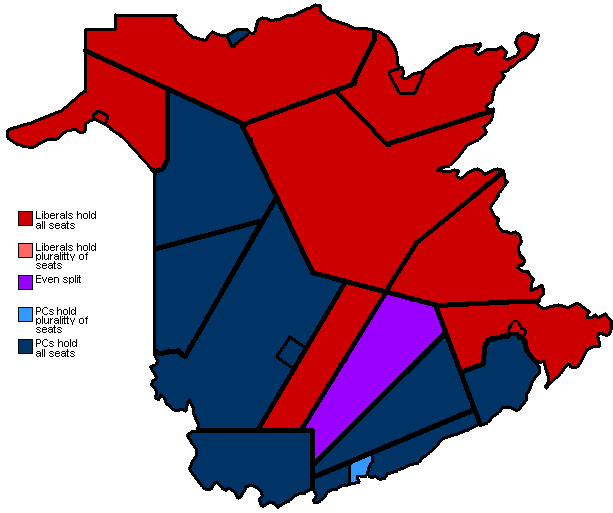
Premier before election
Louis Robichaud
Liberal
Premier after election
Louis Robichaud
Liberal

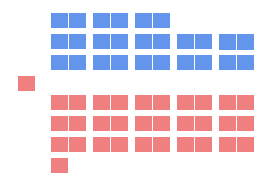
Rendition of party representation in the 46th New Brunswick Legislative Assembly decided by this election. Liberals (32) Progressive Conservatives (26)

The 1967 New Brunswick general election was held on October 23, 1967, to elect 58 members to the 46th New Brunswick Legislative Assembly, the governing house of the province of New Brunswick, Canada.

== Description ==
The governing Liberal Party, under Premier Louis Robichaud, had just completed implementing its landmark Equal Opportunity program, which drastically improved government services in poorer and francophone regions of the province. Several Liberal cabinet ministers had quit politics during the previous term, including some who were uncomfortable with Robichaud's policies. Education minister Henry Irwin was fired after having an extramarital affair.

The Progressive Conservatives had selected Charlie Van Horne as leader in November 1966. Van Horne, whose cowboy hat had become his trademark to voters, had faced several lawsuits over his personal financial matters during the 1960s which caused him to sell his hotel in Campbellton, but claimed they had all been settled. Liberals claimed that industrialist K.C. Irving, who was in his own personal battle with Robichaud, was funding Van Horne's campaign. Conservatives were hopeful that Van Horne's charisma and speaking skills could surpass those of Robichaud.

During the campaign, critics accused Van Horne of being vague on his promises for "a new tomorrow". He had pledged to increase health care and education funding while reducing taxes, with no answer as to how it would be accomplished.

Questions arose as to the Conservative campaign's funding. He campaigned across the province in a Cadillac, while Don Messer, one of the most popular musicians in Atlantic Canada at the time, accompanied Van Horne at several campaign stops. However, Equal Opportunity was wildly unpopular in many Conservative strongholds and the Liberals had been perceived as arrogant. Polls showed a close race.

Robichaud campaigned under the slogan of "a responsible government". With the entire campaign focused on attacking Van Horne, he used a dramatic effect of listing all of the Conservatives' promises on paper and unfurling it across a room. In the final days of the campaign, two Toronto newspapers ran unflattering articles about Van Horne, to which he threatened to sue the authors. The Conservative reaction is believed to have turned the results decidedly in Robichaud's favour.

The New Brunswick New Democratic Party participated in a New Brunswick provincial election for the first time, having sat out of the 1963 election. The party ran only three candidates, all of whom contested the multi-member district of Northumberland and none of whom were elected.

Brenda Mary Robertson was elected in this election. She was the first woman elected to the Legislative Assembly of New Brunswick and the first woman to become a cabinet minister in the province.

== Election results ==
New Brunswick general election, 1967
Party	Leader	Seats	Pop Vote
New Brunswick Liberal Association	Louis Robichaud	32	52.8%
Progressive Conservative Party of New Brunswick	Charles Van Horne	26	47.1%
New Brunswick New Democratic Party	Jack Currie	0	0.1%

Popular vote
Liberal	52.80%
PC	47.10%
New Democratic	0.10%

Seats summary
Liberal	55.17%
PC	44.83%

== Sources ==
Louis J. Robichaud: A Not So Quiet Revolution by Michel Cormier, translated by Jonathan Kaplansky. Faye Editions, 2004.
