= List of shipwrecks in November 1842 =

The list of shipwrecks in November 1842 includes ships sunk, foundered, wrecked, grounded, or otherwise lost during November 1842.

== 1 November ==
List of shipwrecks: 1 November 1842
| Ship | State | Description |
|---|---|---|
| Caroline | Sweden | The ship was wrecked on Öland with some loss of life. She was on a voyage from Stockholm to Stettin. |
| Enigheden | Denmark | The ship was driven ashore near Lemvig. Her crew were rescued. |
| Essex | United Kingdom | The ship ran aground on the Corton Sand, in the North Sea off the coast of Suffolk. She was later refloated. |
| Geschwister | Kingdom of Hanover | The ship was driven ashore on the south point of Bornholm, Denmark with the loss of all but two of her crew. Five people were drowned attempting to rescue her crew. She was on a voyage from Königsberg, Prussia to London, United Kingdom. |
| John and Ann | United Kingdom | The brig was wrecked 200 nautical miles (370 km) west of Alexandria, Egypt with the loss of one of her seven crew. She was on a voyage from Malta to Alexandria. |

== 2 November ==
List of shipwrecks: 2 November 1842
| Ship | State | Description |
|---|---|---|
| Alfred | United Kingdom | The ship capsized and was severely damaged at Youghal, County Cork. |
| Bachelor | (United Kingdom of Great Britain and Ireland) British North America | The ship foundered 7 nautical miles (13 km) off Cape Sable Island, Nova Scotia. Her crew were rescued. She was on a voyage from Shelburne, Nova Scotia to Saint John, New Brunswick. |
| Betsey Heron | United Kingdom | The ship ran aground near Summer's Island, Russia and capsized. She was on a voyage from Saint Petersburg, Russia to London. |
| Carl Adolphe | Hamburg | The ship was driven ashore at Dover, Kent, United Kingdom. She was on a voyage from Hamburg to Angostura, Venezuela. Carl Adolphe was refloated on 3 November and resumed her voyage. |
| George | United Kingdom | The brig was driven ashore at Porto-Novo, Dahomey. |
| George Clark | United Kingdom | The ship was driven ashore at Danzig. She was subsequently taken into Danzig by land. |
| Isabella | United Kingdom | The ship was driven onto a reef in the Gulf of Smyrna. She was on a voyage from Cardiff, Glamorgan to Smyrna, Ottoman Empire. She was later refloated and taken into Smyrna, arriving on 6 November. |
| Johan Erith | Sweden | The ship was wrecked near Bjorkskar. All on board were rescued. She was on a voyage from Stockholm to Gotland. |
| Martha | United Kingdom | The ship was wrecked on the Hartwell Reef, Cape Verde Islands. Her crew were rescued. |
| Reform | United Kingdom | The ship was in collision with a barque off The Skerries, Anglesey and foundered. Her crew were rescued by Concordia (United Kingdom). Reform was on a voyage from Tralee, County Kerry to Liverpool, Lancashire. |
| Trial | United Kingdom | The ship ran aground on a reef in the Gulf of Smyrna. She was on a voyage from Troon, Ayrshire to Smyrna. She was later refloated and taken into Smyrna, arriving on 6 November. |

== 3 November ==
List of shipwrecks: 3 November 1842
| Ship | State | Description |
|---|---|---|
| Curlew | United Kingdom | The schooner was driven ashore and wrecked on the coast of Labrador, British North America. |
| Ebenezer | United Kingdom | The ship ran aground on the Dortwick Sand, in the North Sea off the coast of County Durham. She was on a voyage from South Shields, County Durham to Tenerife, Canary Islands. Ebenezer was refloated and beached. Following repairs, she resumed her voyage on 9 November. |
| Frithiof | Sweden | The ship was driven ashore and wrecked at Rohneholm, on the east coast of Gotland. She was on a voyage from Kristianstad to London, United Kingdom. |
| Maid of Arkansas | United States | The steamboat was destroyed by fire off "Corroliton". All on board were rescued. |
| Mary | (United Kingdom of Great Britain and Ireland) British North America | The ship was driven ashore and wrecked near Main-à-Dieu, Nova Scotia. Her crew were rescued. |
| Mary Drew | United Kingdom | The ship ran aground at New Orleans, Louisiana, United States. She was on a voyage from New Orleans to Liverpool, Lancashire. She was refloated the next day and resumed her voyage. |
| Mary Stewart | Hamburg | The ship was wrecked at Green Point, Cape Town, Cape Colony. Her crew were rescued. She was on a voyage from Hamburg to Batavia, Netherlands East Indies. |
| Merchant | (United Kingdom of Great Britain and Ireland) British North America | The steamship sprang a leak and was beached and subsequently wrecked with the loss of six lives. Seventeen people were rescued by the steamship Belle (Texas) Merchant was on a voyage from Liverpool, Nova Scotia to Galveston, Republic of Texas. |
| Rover | (United Kingdom of Great Britain and Ireland) New South Wales | The cutter struck the wreck of Denmark Hill (United Kingdom) and foundered off Pitt Water. She was on a voyage from Pitt Water to Sydney. |
| St. Austle | United Kingdom | The schooner struck a sunken rock off Cape Cornwall and foundered with the loss of her captain. She was on a voyage from Newport, Monmouthshire to Penzance, Cornwall. |
| Trial | (United Kingdom of Great Britain and Ireland) British North America | The ship was driven ashore at Antigonish, Nova Scotia with the loss of all 25 crew. She was on a voyage from Prince Edward Island to Saint John's, Newfoundland. She was consequently condemned. |

== 4 November ==
List of shipwrecks: 4 November 1842
| Ship | State | Description |
|---|---|---|
| Defiance | (United Kingdom of Great Britain and Ireland) British North America | The schooner was wrecked at Mosquito, Newfoundland. |
| Edwin Jenny | United States | The schooner was driven ashore in Lake Erie 3 nautical miles (5.6 km) south of Point Abino, Province of Canada. |
| Eliza Ann | (United Kingdom of Great Britain and Ireland) British North America | The schooner was wrecked at Carbonear, Labrador. |
| Favorieten | Sweden | The ship was driven ashore and wrecked near Rohneholm, on the east coast of Gotland. She was on a voyage from Kristianstad to London, United Kingdom. |
| Florida | United States | The schooner was driven ashore in Lake Erie north of Point Abino and was wrecked. |
| Frances Mills | United States | The brig was driven ashore in Lake Erie 3 nautical miles (5.6 km) south of Point Abino. |
| Henry Roop | United States | The schooner was wrecked in Lake Erie at Silver Creek, New York. |
| Herald | (United Kingdom of Great Britain and Ireland) British North America | The schooner was wrecked at Mosquito. |
| Hoop | Netherlands | The sloop ran aground on the Goodwin Sands, Kent, United Kingdom and was abandoned by her crew. She was on a voyage from Rotterdam, South Holland to Rouen, Seine-Inférieure. Hoop was later refloated and taken into Ramsgate, Kent in a severely damaged condition. |
| Indiana | United States | The schooner was wrecked in Gravely Bay, Lake Erie. |
| Jefferson | United States | The schooner was driven ashore in Lake Erie 3 nautical miles (5.6 km) north of the Buffalo Lighthouse with the loss of eight lives. Survivors were rescued by the brig Olive Richmond (United States). |
| Margaret | (United Kingdom of Great Britain and Ireland) British North America | The schooner was wrecked at Carbonear. |
| Mississippi | United States | The schooner was wrecked in Gravely Bay, Lake Erie. |
| M. Kingman | United States | The schooner was wrecked in Gravely Bay, Lake Erie. |
| Ohio | United States | The schooner was wrecked in Gravely Bay, Lake Erie. |
| Octavia | United Kingdom | The ship ran aground and was severely damaged at Bridlington, Yorkshire. She was later refloated. |
| Olive Richmond | United States | The brig was driven ashore in Lake Erie 2 nautical miles (3.7 km) north of the Buffalo Lighthouse. |
| Perth | United Kingdom | The ship collided with a schooner and sank in the River Tay. |
| Republican | United Kingdom | The ship ran aground and was severely damaged at Bridlington. She was later refloated. |
| Rory O'Moore | (United Kingdom of Great Britain and Ireland) New South Wales | The ship was driven ashore and severely damaged at Auckland, New Zealand. |
| Saint Clair | France | The ship was wrecked on the Sabinal Key. Her crew were rescued. She was on a voyage from Le Havre, Seine-Inférieure to Havana, Cuba. |
| Sarah | United Kingdom | The ship foundered off Ballycotton, County Cork. Her crew were rescued. She was on a voyage from Swansea, Glamorgan to Waterford. |
| Sir George Prevost | United Kingdom | The ship ran aground on rocks at "Point-au-Bassain", British North America. She was on a voyage from Quebec City, Province of Canada, British North America to London. |
| Tyro | (United Kingdom of Great Britain and Ireland) British North America | The schooner was wrecked at Carbonear. |
| Union | United Kingdom | The ship was in collision with Hope (United Kingdom) and was consequently beached at South Shields, County Durham. |
| Walter Joy | United States | The schooner was driven ashore in Lake Erie 2 nautical miles (3.7 km) north of the Buffalo Lighthouse. |
| Zwantine | Hamburg | The ship was driven ashore on Rügen, Prussia. Her crew were rescued. She was on a voyage from Hamburg to Saint Petersburg, Russia. |

== 5 November ==
List of shipwrecks: 5 November 1842
| Ship | State | Description |
|---|---|---|
| Auxiliar | United Kingdom | The ship ran aground on the Aldeburgh Neaps, in the North Sea off the coast of Suffolk. She was on a voyage from South Shields, County Durham to London. She was refloated and put into Harwich, Essex. |
| Camille | United Kingdom | The ship was driven ashore at Comarca Lagunera, Mexico. She was abandoned on 10 November. |
| Octavia | United Kingdom | The ship ran aground and was severely damaged at Bridlington, Yorkshire. She was later refloated. |
| Republican | United Kingdom | The ship ran aground and was severely damaged at Bridlington. She was later refloated. |

== 6 November ==
List of shipwrecks: 6 November 1842
| Ship | State | Description |
|---|---|---|
| Caspar | United States | The ship foundered in the Atlantic Ocean. Her crew were rescued. She was on a voyage from Matanzas, Cuba to New York. |
| Gertha | Hamburg | The ship was driven ashore at Mablethorpe, Lincolnshire, United Kingdom. She was on a voyage from Altona to Hull, Yorkshire, United Kingdom. |
| Louisa | United Kingdom | The ship was wrecked on Cape Sable Island, Nova Scotia, British North America. Her crew were rescued. |
| Massachusetts | United States | The ship was driven ashore at Newburyport, Massachusetts. She was on a voyage from Cádiz, Spain to Newburyport. |
| Tris Angelique | France | The brig was destroyed by fire. Her crew were rescued by Countess of London (United Kingdom). Tris Angelique was on a voyage from Rouen, Seine-Inférieure to Marseille, Bouches-du-Rhône. |
| Virginia | United States | The barque foundered in the Atlantic Ocean off the coast of the Florida Territory. Her crew were rescued. She was on a voyage from Matanzas to Cowes, Isle of Wight, United Kingdom. |
| Yandew | Netherlands | The ship ran aground on the Black Middens, in the North Sea off the coast of County Durham, United Kingdom. She was on a voyage from Dordrecht to South Shields, County Durham. |

== 7 November ==
List of shipwrecks: 7 November 1842
| Ship | State | Description |
|---|---|---|
| Arrow | United Kingdom | The ship was driven ashore near Cemlyn, Anglesey. She was on a voyage from Bristol, Gloucestershire to Liverpool, Lancashire. She had become a wreck by 17 November. |
| Euphemia | United Kingdom | The ship sprang a leak and was beached at Tobermory, Mull, Outer Hebrides. She was on a voyage from Fraserburgh, Aberdeenshire to Killala, County Louth. |
| Gazelle | Prussia | The steamship was driven ashore at Riga, Russia. |
| Jenny | United Kingdom | The schooner was in collision with Albert and was beached on the north coast of Kent. |
| Lady Wood | United Kingdom | The ship struck a sunken rock off Cape Tormentine, New Brunswick, British North America and sank. Her crew were rescued. She was on a voyage from Orwell, Province of Canada, British North America to Bedeque, Prince Edward Island, British North America. |
| Lucy | United Kingdom | The ship ran aground on the North Bank, in Liverpool Bay. She was refloated and proceeded on her voyage. |
| Margaret and Sarah | United Kingdom | The ship was wrecked on a reef off Domesnes, Norway. Her crew were rescued. She was on a voyage from Riga to Sheerness, Kent. |

== 8 November ==
List of shipwrecks: 8 November 1842
| Ship | State | Description |
|---|---|---|
| Argus | United Kingdom | The schooner was driven ashore and wrecked at Mallinbegg, County Donegal. |
| Augusta | United States | The brig ran aground on the Old Inlet Shoals, in Little Egg Harbor. |
| Hampden | United Kingdom | The ship ran aground at the mouth of the Mississippi River. |
| Lady Anne Wynne | United Kingdom | The ship departed from Sligo for Glasgow, Renfrewshire. Presumed foundered with the loss of all hands; wreckage thought to be from the ship washed up on North Uist, Outer Hebrides on 15 December. |
| Lady Hood | United Kingdom | The ship was driven ashore at Tobermory, Isle of Mull, Outer Hebrides. She was on a voyage from Newry, County Antrim to Stornoway, Isle of Lewis, Outer Hebrides. Lady Hood was later refloated. |
| Mary Turcan | United Kingdom | The ship was driven ashore and severely damaged on Læsø, Denmark. She was on a voyage from Saint Petersburg, Russia to London and/or Liverpool, Lancashire. She was refloated on 18 November and put into Aalborg, Denmark for repairs. |
| New Expedition | United Kingdom | The ship was driven ashore and wrecked 20 nautical miles (37 km) north of Wexford. Her crew were rescued. She was on a voyage from Portmadoc, Caernarfonshire to Wexford. |
| Preciosa | Sweden | The ship was wrecked at "Wingo". She was on a voyage from Kristianstad to London. |
| Shamrock | (United Kingdom of Great Britain and Ireland) British North America | The ship was driven ashore at Barnegat, New Jersey, United States. She was on a voyage from Yarmouth, Nova Scotia to New York. She was declared a total loss. |

== 9 November ==
List of shipwrecks: 9 November 1842
| Ship | State | Description |
|---|---|---|
| Bromley | United Kingdom | The schooner was driven ashore and wrecked at the "Point of Breckness", Orkney Islands with the loss of four of her six crew. She was on a voyage from Liverpool, Lancashire to Aberdeen. |
| Cedrine | (United Kingdom of Great Britain and Ireland) Grenada | The sloop was driven ashore at Grenville. |
| Eclipse | United Kingdom | The steamship was driven ashore at "Whaaroa" (possibly Whataroa?), New Zealand. Her crew were rescued. |
| Edina Restaurada | Brazil | The ship was wrecked in the Rio Grande. Sh was on a voyage from Bahia to Pernambuco. |
| Elizabeth | United Kingdom | The ship was severely damaged at Whitehaven, Cumberland. She was on a voyage from Dublin to Whitehaven. |
| Lively | United Kingdom | The ship was driven ashore and wrecked at Lydstep Haven, Pembrokeshire. Her crew were rescued. |
| Manchester | United Kingdom | The ship was driven ashore east of Arendal, Norway. Her crew were rescued. She was on a voyage from Saint Petersburg, Russia to Hull, Yorkshire. She became a wreck on 12 November. |
| Marquis Marshall | United Kingdom | The ship foundered in the Irish Sea off Ravenglass, Cumberland. Her crew were rescued. She was on a voyage from Liverpool to Londonderry. |
| Mary | United Kingdom | The ship was driven ashore at Workington, Cumberland. She was refloated on 18 November and taken into Workington. |
| Mary and Agnes | United Kingdom | The ship was driven ashore at Whitehaven. |
| Mentor | France | The ship was driven ashore and wrecked near Cagliari, Sardinia. |
| Perseverance | United Kingdom | The ship was driven ashore at Workington. She was refloated on 18 November and taken into Workington. |
| Triton | United Kingdom | The ship was driven ashore at Maryport, Cumberland. She was on a voyage from Whitehaven, Cumberland, to Belfast, County Antrim. Triton was refloated on 14 November. |
| Unicorn | United Kingdom | The ship was driven ashore at Saltfleet, Lincolnshire. She was on a voyage from London to Hull, Yorkshire. She was later refloated and completed her voyage. |
| William | United Kingdom | The full-rigged ship was wrecked in Kilchattan Bay with the loss of two of her crew. She was on a voyage from Gloucester to Greenock, Renfrewshire. |

== 10 November ==
List of shipwrecks: 10 November 1842
| Ship | State | Description |
|---|---|---|
| Arthur and Rachael | United Kingdom | The schooner was driven ashore and wrecked 3 nautical miles (5.6 km) south of Portpatrick, Wigtownshire. Her crew were rescued. She was on a voyage from Dublin to Ayr. |
| Brothers | (United Kingdom of Great Britain and Ireland) New Zealand | The whaler, a cutter, was capsized by a whirlwind at Akaroa with the loss of three of the fourteen people on board. |
| Complex | (United Kingdom of Great Britain and Ireland) British North America | The ship was wrecked on Cape Canso, Nova Scotia. Her crew were rescued. |
| Diana | United Kingdom | The ship ran aground off Glasscock's Island, near Natchez, Mississippi, United States. She was a voyage from Natches to Liverpool, Lancashire. Diana refloated in January 1843 and taken into New Orleans, Louisiana, for repairs. |
| Diligence | United Kingdom | The smack was driven ashore on Chesil Beach, Dorset with the loss of a crew member. She was on a voyage from Guernsey, Channel Islands to Southampton, Hampshire. |
| Fidelity | United Kingdom | The ship was driven ashore and wrecked on Jura, Inner Hebrides. She was on a voyage from Lerwick, Shetland Islands to Bristol, Gloucestershire. She was refloated on 15 December and taken into "Ardilshan" for repairs. |
| Lady Hood | United Kingdom | The ship was driven ashore at Tobermory, Mull, Outer Hebrides. She was on a voyage from Newry, County Down to Stornoway, Isle of Lewis, Outer Hebrides. She was refloated and taken into Tobermory. |
| Mary and Maria | United Kingdom | The ship was driven ashore at Great Yarmouth, Norfolk. She was on a voyage from Hull, Yorkshire to London. Mary and Maria was refloated and taken into Great Yarmouth. |
| Sarah | United Kingdom | Captain Cape's ship was driven ashore at Harrington, Cumberland. She was on a voyage from Dublin to Workington, Cumberland. |
| Sarah | United Kingdom | Captain Martin's ship was driven ashore at Harrington. |
| Tom Street | United Kingdom | The brig was wrecked on the coast of the Florida Territory. All on board survived. She was on a voyage from New Orleans, Louisiana, United States to Jamaica. |

== 11 November ==
List of shipwrecks: 11 November 1842
| Ship | State | Description |
|---|---|---|
| Carlton | (United Kingdom of Great Britain and Ireland) British North America | The barque ran aground at the mouth of the Miramichi River. She was later refloated and resumed her voyage. |
| Clyde | United Kingdom | The ship was wrecked on the north coast of Cuba. All on board were rescued. She was on a voyage from Le Havre, Seine-Inférieure, France to New Orleans, Louisiana, United States. |
| Constance | Russia | The ship was driven ashore and wrecked in the Shetland Islands, United Kingdom. She was on a voyage from Liverpool, Lancashire, United Kingdom to Kuressaare. |
| Guadiana | United Kingdom | The ship was driven ashore at Fredrikstad, Norway and was abandoned by her crew. She was refloated on 13 November. |
| Northern Conference | United Kingdom | The barque was abandoned in the North Sea off the coast of Yorkshire. Her crew were rescued by Star (United Kingdom). Northern Conference foundered about 8 nautical miles (15 km) off the mouth of the Humber. She was on a voyage from South Shields, County Durham to London. |
| Oak | United Kingdom | The ship ran aground at Scarborough, Yorkshire. She was on a voyage from Newcastle upon Tyne, Northumberland to Arundel, Sussex. She was later refloated. |
| Orleans | (United Kingdom of Great Britain and Ireland) British North America | The ship was wrecked on Green Island. She was on a voyage from Sydney, Nova Scotia to Campo Belo, Brazil. |
| Petrel | United Kingdom | The lugger was wrecked on the Gunfleet Sands. Her crew were rescued by the Great Yarmouth Lifeboat. |
| St. John | United Kingdom | The barque ran aground at the mouth of the Miramichi River. She was later refloated and resumed her voyage. |

== 12 November ==
List of shipwrecks: 12 November 1842
| Ship | State | Description |
|---|---|---|
| Celt | United Kingdom | The ship was driven ashore and damaged at "Patanilla". She was on a voyage from Patanilla to London. Kate was refloated and put back to Patanilla, where she was condemned. |
| Ceres | United States | The ship caught fire off Cape Canaveral, Florida Territory. She was beached on Grand Bahama, Bahamas and burnt out. All on board survived. |
| Christopher Dove | United Kingdom | The ship ran aground on the Mouse Sand, in the North Sea off the coast of Essex. She was on a voyage from South Shields, County Durham to London. She was refloated and resumed her voyage. |
| Friendship | United Kingdom | The brig was driven ashore and wrecked between Newton and Porthcawl, Glamorgan. Her crew were rescued. She was on a voyage from Bideford, Devon to Porthcawl. |
| Gregory Bogosloff | Russia | The ship was driven ashore by ice 4 versts (2.31 nautical miles (4.27 km)) south of Kronstadt. |
| Hamilla or Henrietta | United Kingdom | The West Indiaman was wrecked at Portmadoc, Caernarfonshire. She was on a voyage from Glasgow, Renfrewshire to Demerara, British Honduras. |
| Jolly Tar | United Kingdom | The ship was wrecked on the coast of Cuba. She was on a voyage from London to a port in Mexico. |
| Reliance | United Kingdom | Reliance. The East Indiaman was driven ashore and wrecked at Merlimont, Pas-de-Calais, France with the loss of 109 lives. There were seven survivors. She was on a voyage from China to London. |
| Thomas and Nancy | United Kingdom | The ship collided with Gleaner (United Kingdom) and sank in the North Sea off the coast of County Durham. Her crew were rescued. |
| William | United Kingdom | The full-rigged ship foundered off the Isle of Bute with the loss of two of her crew. |

== 13 November ==
List of shipwrecks: 13 November 1842
| Ship | State | Description |
|---|---|---|
| Armoricain | France | The lugger was driven ashore and wrecked on the coast of Pas-de-Calais with the loss of all five crew. |
| Elbe | United Kingdom | The schooner collided with Robert (United Kingdom) and foundered in the North Sea off the coast of Norfolk. Her crew were rescued. |
| Elizabeth | Flag unknown | The ship was driven ashore and wrecked at Étaples, Pas-de-Calais, France. Her crew were rescued. She was on a voyage from Porto, Portugal to Helsingør, Denmark and Riga, Russia. |
| Industry | United Kingdom | The ship ran aground on the Mouse Sand, in the North Sea off the coast of Essex. She was on a voyage from London to Rotterdam, South Holland, Netherlands. Industry was refloated on 15 November and taken into Harwich, Essex. |
| Leontine | France | The ship was lost off Cabo Catoche, Mexico. |
| Poll | United Kingdom | The ship was in collision with a steamship and was beached on the Sandwich Flats. She was declared a total loss. |
| Seabird | United Kingdom | The fishing lugger departed from Great Yarmouth, Norfolk. No further trace, presumed foundered with the loss of all eleven crew. |
| William Penn | United States | The ship was lost off Cabo Catoche. |
| Xenophon | United Kingdom | The ship was driven ashore near Saint Petersburg, Russia. She was on a voyage from Saint Petersburg to London. She was refloated and proceeded on her voyage. |

== 14 November ==
List of shipwrecks: 14 November 1842
| Ship | State | Description |
|---|---|---|
| Aimee Desiree | United Kingdom | The ship was wrecked on the Île de Ré, Charente-Maritime with the loss of all hands. |
| Anne | United Kingdom | The brig ran aground on the Red Sand, off the north Kent coast. She was on a voyage from Liverpool, Lancashire to London. Anne was refloated and taken into Whitstable, Kent. |
| Gannet | United Kingdom | The ship was wrecked on the Whittaker Sand. Her crew were rescued. She was on a voyage from South Shields, County Durham to London. |
| Gleneira | United Kingdom | The ship was wrecked on the northeast point of "Pulo Bintang". She was on a voyage from Singapore to Siam. |
| Moscow | United Kingdom | The ship was driven ashore and wrecked at Wells-next-the-Sea, Norfolk She was on a voyage from Whitby, Yorkshire to Norwich, Norfolk. |
| Rainbow | United Kingdom | The ship was driven onto St. Juliens Rocks, Guernsey, Channel Islands. She was on a voyage from Southampton, Hampshire to Guernsey. She was refloated and taken into Guernsey. |
| Thomas | United Kingdom | The ship ran aground on the Herd Sand, in the North Sea off the coast of County Durham. Her crew were rescued by the North Shields Lifeboat. She was on a voyage from Antwerp, Belgium to South Shields. Thomas was refloated on 17 November. |

== 15 November ==
List of shipwrecks: 15 November 1842
| Ship | State | Description |
|---|---|---|
| Atalanta | Netherlands | The ship was sighted off Ascension Island whilst on a voyage from Tjilatjap, Netherlands East Indies to Dordrecht, South Holland. No further trace, presumed foundered with the loss of all hands. |
| British Queen | United Kingdom | The schooner was driven ashore and wrecked at Baldoyle, County Dublin with the loss of four of her crew. She was on a voyage from Newfoundland, British North America to Liverpool, Lancashire. |
| Cygnet | United Kingdom | The ship was driven ashore and wrecked at Malahide, County Dublin. Her crew were rescued. |
| Friends | United Kingdom | The ship ran aground on the Nore. She was on a voyage from Sunderland, County Durham to London. She was refloated and resumed her voyage. |
| Hamilton | United Kingdom | The brig was wrecked on the Gunfleet Sand, in the North Sea off the coast of Essex with the loss of nine of her ten crew. She was on a voyage from London to North Shields, County Durham. |
| Jeune Virginie | France | The ship was wrecked in the Gulf of Bizerte. Her crew were rescued. |
| John | United Kingdom | The ship sprang a leak and was beached at Tobermory, Isle of Mull. She was on a voyage from Glasgow, Renfrewshire to Gothenburg, Sweden. |
| Little Henry | United Kingdom | The ship was driven ashore and wrecked at Cap Gris Nez, Pas-de-Calais, France. Her crew were rescued. |
| Mary Stewart | United Kingdom | The ship ran aground on the Nore, off Sheerness, Kent. She was on a voyage from South Shields, County Durham to London. |
| Milo | United States | The fishing schooner was lost on the Isle of Shoals. Crew saved. |
| Nabob | Spain | The ship ran aground on the English Bank, in the Atlantic Ocean off the coast of Argentina. She was on a voyage from Cádiz to Montevideo, Uruguay. |
| Robinson | United Kingdom | The ship was wrecked on the Nore. Her crew were rescued. She was on a voyage from Hartlepool, County Durham to London. |
| Ruthen Castle | United Kingdom | The ship was wrecked near Port St. Mary, Isle of Man. She was on a voyage from Dundalk, County Louth to Liverpool, Lancashire. |
| Wilhelmina | Sweden | The ship was wrecked on the Langwiks Rocks, in the Baltic Sea off the coast of Sweden. |

== 16 November ==
List of shipwrecks: 16 November 1842
| Ship | State | Description |
|---|---|---|
| Columbia or Cornubia | United Kingdom | The sloop was driven ashore and wrecked near Tenby, Pembrokeshire. Her crew were rescued. She was on a voyage from Waterford to Tenby. |
| Isabella | United Kingdom | The schooner collided with the brig Integrity (United Kingdom) and foundered in the North Sea 12 nautical miles (22 km) east south east of Flamborough Head, Yorkshire with the loss of all hands. |
| Megvie | United Kingdom | The ship was driven ashore and wrecked at Aberdeen. She was on a voyage from Aberdeen to South Shields, County Durham. |
| Mercury | Prussia | The ship was driven ashore near Kolberg. Her crew were rescued. She was on a voyage from Memel to Stettin. |
| Peggy | United Kingdom | The ship ran aground on the Vogel Sand, in the North Sea. She was on a voyage from Banff, Aberdeenshire to Cuxhaven. Peggy was refloated and completed her voyage. |
| 'Susan | United Kingdom | The ship was driven ashore at Lynmouth, Devon. Her crew were rescued. She was refloated the next day and taken into Lynmouth. |

== 17 November ==
List of shipwrecks: 17 November 1842
| Ship | State | Description |
|---|---|---|
| Charles Eyes | United Kingdom | The ship was wrecked on the Gallega reef, off Veracruz, Mexico. Her crew were rescued. |
| Concordia | Stettin | The ship was driven ashore and wrecked on Fårö, Sweden. |
| Globe | United Kingdom | The brig was driven ashore near Baldoyle, County Dublin. Her crew were rescued. She was on a voyage from Demerara, British Honduras to the Clyde. |
| Jane | United Kingdom | The schooner was wrecked at the mouth of the River Spey. she was on a voyage from Arbroath, Forfarshire to Wick, Caithness. |
| Neptun | Hamburg | The sloop was taken into St. Ives, Cornwall, United Kingdom in a sinking condition with assistance from Providence (United Kingdom). She was on a voyage from Cardiff, Glamorgan, United Kingdom to Altona. |
| Saturnus | Lübeck | The ship was driven ashore and wrecked on Fårö. She was on a voyage from Kristianstad, Sweden to Lübeck. |

== 18 November ==
List of shipwrecks: 18 November 1842
| Ship | State | Description |
|---|---|---|
| Eliza | United Kingdom | The ship was driven ashore on Anticosti Island, Province of Canada, British North America. She floated off and sank in the Saint Lawrence River with the loss of three lives. |
| Joanna | United Kingdom | The ship was driven ashore on Heron Island, New Brunswick, British North America. She was on a voyage from Dalhousie, New Brunswick to the Clyde. |
| Mary and Agnes | United Kingdom | The ship was driven ashore at Shoreham-by-Sea, Sussex. She was refloated on 20 November and taken into Shoreham-by-Sea. |
| Thomas and Edward | United Kingdom | The ship was driven ashore and wrecked at Port La Tour, Nova Scotia, British North America. She was on a voyage from Antigua to Liverpool, Nova Scotia. |

== 19 November ==
List of shipwrecks: 19 November 1842
| Ship | State | Description |
|---|---|---|
| Brothers | United Kingdom | The ship foundered in the North Sea off St Abb's Head, Berwickshire. Her crew were rescued. She was on a voyage from Grangemouth, Stirlingshire to Sunderland, County Durham. |
| Commerce | United Kingdom | The ship was driven ashore and wrecked at Port Eynon, Glamorgan. |
| Glengary | United Kingdom | The barque was wrecked on Bintang, Netherlands East Indies. Her crew were rescued. |
| Integrity | United Kingdom | The ship foundered in The Wash with the loss of all hands. |
| Lagan | United Kingdom | The ship was driven ashore at Carrickfergus, County Antrim. She was on a voyage from London to Belfast, County Antrim. She was refloated and completed her voyage. |
| Magnet | United Kingdom | The ship was driven ashore and damaged in the Saint Lawrence River. she was on a voyage from Quebec City, Province of Canada, British North America to Liverpool, Lancashire. She was refloated and towed back to Quebec City. |
| Progress | United Kingdom | The schooner capsized and sank off the Gunfleet Beacon, in the North Sea off the coast of Essex. Her crew were rescued by HMRC Desmond ( Board of Customs). She was on a voyage from London to Goole, Yorkshire. |
| Zante | United Kingdom | The ship was wrecked at "Baldayo", on the north coast of Spain with the loss of six of her crew. She was on a voyage from London to Trieste. |

== 20 November ==
List of shipwrecks: 20 November 1842
| Ship | State | Description |
|---|---|---|
| Annie | United Kingdom | The barque sprang a leak and sank 20 nautical miles (37 km) west of "Cape Strath". A message in a bottle washed up at Hartlepool, County Durham on 1 September 1860 stating the fact. |
| Blossom | United Kingdom | The ship ran aground on the Hurdgrunde, in the Baltic Sea off the coast of Prussia. |
| Caroline Maria | Prussia | The ship was driven ashore near "Peise". She was refloated on 22 November. |
| Jim Crow | (United Kingdom of Great Britain and Ireland) Jamaica | The sloop foundered at Annotto Bay. |
| Jules Cæsar | Kingdom of the Two Sicilies | The ship was wrecked on "Pondas Island". Her crew were rescued. She was on a voyage from Oran, Algeria to Marseille, Bouches-du-Rhône, France. |

== 21 November ==
List of shipwrecks: 21 November 1842
| Ship | State | Description |
|---|---|---|
| Bessy Robertson | United Kingdom | The ship was driven ashore at Mytilene, Greece and was abandoned by her crew. She was on a voyage from Smyrna to Ayvalık, Ottoman Empire. Bessy Robertson was refloated on 23 November and taken into Mytilene. |
| Brodrene | Norway | The ship was sunk by ice near "Kleppenas". She was on a voyage from Moss to Holmstad. |
| Ellen | United Kingdom | The schooner ran aground at Dover, Kent. |
| Enterprise | United Kingdom | The ship departed from Messina, Sicily for London. No further trace, presumed foundered with the loss of all hands. |
| Gazelle | United Kingdom | The ship was driven ashore on the Landscar Rocks, on the coast of County Durham and was wrecked. She was on a voyage from Hartlepool to Sunderland. |
| Isabella | United Kingdom British North America. | The ship ran aground on a reef south west of St. Peter's Island. Her crew were rescued. |
| Queen Victoria | United Kingdom | The brig was driven ashore near Eyemouth, Berwickshire. She was on a voyage from Memel, Prussia to Eyemouth. Queen Victoria was refloated and taken into Eyemouth. |
| Virgin de los Remedios | Spain | The ship was wrecked at Europa Point, Gibraltar. She was on a voyage from Estepona to Gibraltar. |

== 22 November ==
List of shipwrecks: 22 November 1842
| Ship | State | Description |
|---|---|---|
| Bee | United Kingdom | The ship ran aground on the Cutler Sand, in the North Sea off the coast of Suffolk and was damaged. She was on a voyage from Newcastle upon Tyne, Northumberland to London. Bee was assisted into Harwich, Essex. |
| Edward Auld | United Kingdom | The ship was driven ashore and damaged in Clew Bay. She was on a voyage from Troon, Ayrshire to Newport, Monmouthshire. She was later refloated. |
| Johanna Carolina | Prussia | The ship was driven ashore on the Alt Tiefe. She was on a voyage from Swinemünde to Pillau. |

== 23 November ==
List of shipwrecks: 23 November 1842
| Ship | State | Description |
|---|---|---|
| Aldborough | United Kingdom | The ship foundered in the Haisborough Gut, off the coast of Norfolk. |
| Brothers | United Kingdom | The schooner foundered in the North Sea off St. Abbs Head, Berwickshire. Her crew were rescued. She was on a voyage from Grangemouth, Stirlingshire to Sunderland, County Durham. |
| Emerentine | (United Kingdom of Great Britain and Ireland) British North America | The ship was wrecked on Anticosti Island, Province of Canada with the loss of all hands. She was on a voyage from Montreal, Province of Canada to Dalhousie, New Brunswick. |
| Gleaner | United Kingdom | The ship was wrecked on Goose Island. She was on a voyage from Quebec City, Province of Canada to London. She was refloated in May 1843 and taken into Quebec City, where she arrived on 14 May. |
| Leeds | United Kingdom | The paddle steamer ran aground on the Holm Sand in the North Sea. She was on a voyage from Hull, Yorkshire to Hamburg. She was refloated the next day and resumed her voyage. |
| New Hope | (United Kingdom of Great Britain and Ireland) Guernsey | The ship was driven ashore and wrecked at Guernsey. |
| Zephyr | United Kingdom | The ship was wrecked on Bally Quiston Point, County Down. She was on a voyage from the Clyde to Stettin. |

== 24 November ==
List of shipwrecks: 24 November 1842
| Ship | State | Description |
|---|---|---|
| Catherine Fraser | (United Kingdom of Great Britain and Ireland) British North America | The ship was wrecked near Canso, Nova Scotia. Her crew were rescued. She was on a voyage from Halifax, Nova Scotia to Pictou, Nova Scotia. She was refloated in May 1843 and taken into Pictou. |
| David | United Kingdom | The ship sprang a leak and put into Sheerness, Kent, where she sank. She was on a voyage from Hartlepool, County Durham to Ramsgate, Kent. |
| Emerald | United Kingdom | The ship was driven ashore in Gibraltar Bay. She was on a voyage from Alexandria, Egypt to Cork. |
| Enterprize | United Kingdom | The barque was wrecked on the Manicougan Shoals. Her crew were rescued by George Ramsay (United Kingdom). Enterprize was on a voyage from Quebec City, Province of Canada, British North America to Liverpool, Lancashire. She was refloated in May 1843 and put back to Quebec City, where she arrived on 19 May. |
| Hannah Malvina | United Kingdom British North America | The ship struck the east point of Prince Edward Island, British North America. She was on a voyage from Quebec City to Jamaica. She put into the Gut of Canso and was consequently condemned. |
| Rotterdam Packet | United Kingdom | The ship was wrecked on the Haisborough Sands, in the North Sea off the coast of Norfolk. Her crew were rescued. She was on a voyage from Dordrecht, South Holland, Netherlands to Newcastle upon Tyne, Northumberland. |
| Waltroon | United Kingdom | The ship was driven ashore at Little Harbour, Halifax, Nova Scotia, British North America. She was on a voyage from Halifax to Miramichi, New Brunswick, British North America. She was refloated on 5 December. |
| William Lang Black | (United Kingdom of Great Britain and Ireland) British North America | The ship was driven ashore on St. Peter's Island. Her crew were rescued. She was on a voyage from Charlottetown, Prince Edward Island to Sydney, Nova Scotia. She was refloated on 23 January 1843 and taken into port. |

== 25 November ==
List of shipwrecks: 25 November 1842
| Ship | State | Description |
|---|---|---|
| Apparancen | Sweden | The ship was wrecked on the Skagen Reef. Her crew were rescued. She was on a voyage from Kristianstad to London, United Kingdom. |
| Catinca | Kingdom of Hanover | The ship was wrecked on the south coast of Møn, Denmark. She was on a voyage from Riga, Russia to Emden. |
| Consiglio | Spain | The ship was driven ashore at Gibraltar. She was later refloated. |
| Dulcinea | United Kingdom | The ship was driven ashore and severely damaged at Carrickfergus, County Antrim. She was on a voyage from Maryport, Cumberland to Belfast, County Antrim. Dulcinea was refloated and taken into Belfast in a wrecked condition. |
| Dusty Miller | (United Kingdom of Great Britain and Ireland) Van Diemen's Land | The ship was wrecked at Port Fairy with the loss of her captain. |
| Elizabeth | United Kingdom | The ship was wrecked on the Falsterbo Reef, in the Baltic Sea off the coast of Sweden. She was on a voyage from Danzig to London. |
| Erndte | Lübeck | The ship was driven ashore at Darßer Ort, Kingdom of Prussia. She was on a voyage from Riga to Lübeck. She was later refloated and resumed her voyage. |
| Essington | (United Kingdom of Great Britain and Ireland) New South Wales | The ship was presumed to have foundered off the coast of South Australia with the loss of all hands. |
| Express | United Kingdom | The ship was driven ashore and damaged near "Fort San Felipe", Spain. She was refloated on 29 November. |
| Happy Family | United Kingdom | The ship ran aground on the Falsterbo Reef. She was on a voyage from Riga, Russia to London. She was refloated and put into Helsingør, Denmark. |
| Harmony | United Kingdom | The ship was wrecked on a shoal (approx 12°N 113°E) with the loss of four lives. She was on a voyage from Manila, Spanish East Indies to Calcutta, India. |
| Jane and Mary | United Kingdom | The ship was driven ashore west of Sanlúcar de Barrameda, Spain. she was on a voyage from Seville, Spain to London. |
| Powhattan | United States | The ship ran aground in Gibraltar Bay and was damaged. She was on a voyage from Havana Cuba to Trieste. |

== 26 November ==
List of shipwrecks: 26 November 1842
| Ship | State | Description |
|---|---|---|
| Chatham | United Kingdom | The barque was wrecked at Figueira da Foz, Portugal with the loss of five lives. She was on a voyage from London to Sydney, New South Wales |
| Espoir | France | The brig was driven ashore at the Tower of Belém, Lisbon, Portugal. She was on a voyage from Marseille, Bouches-du-Rhône to Rouen, Seine-Inférieure. |
| Frembringeren | Prussia | The ship was wrecked on the south east point of Bornholm, Denmark. All on board were rescued. She was on a voyage from Memel to Hamburg. |
| Paradise | United Kingdom | The ship was driven ashore and wrecked at Fiume, Austrian Empire. |
| Ramsay | United Kingdom | The ship struck a rock and was damaged at Ascension Island. |
| Susannah | United Kingdom | The ship ran aground on Landal's Reef, off Halmstad, Denmark. She was on a voyage from Königsberg, Prussia to Hull, Yorkshire. She was later refloated and resumed her voyage. |

== 27 November ==
List of shipwrecks: 27 November 1842
| Ship | State | Description |
|---|---|---|
| Andriette | Netherlands | The ship was driven ashore near Kragerø, Norway. Her crew were rescued. She was on a voyage from Kalmar, Sweden to Amsterdam, Netherlands. |
| Ann | United Kingdom | The ship ran aground off Margate, Kent. She was on a voyage from Montevideo, Uruguay to London. She was refloated and taken into Margate. |
| Augusta | Danzig | The ship was wrecked on the Skagen Reef, in the Baltic Sea. Her crew were rescued. She was on a voyage from Danzig to Egersund, Norway. |
| Basquida | France | The ship was driven ashore at Bayonne, Basses-Pyrénées. She was on a voyage from Terneuzen, Zeeland, Netherlands to Bayonne. |
| Carolina | Spain | The ship was driven ashore and wrecked west of Sanlúcar de Barrameda with the loss of five of her crew. She was on a voyage from Buenos Aires to Cádiz. |
| Flora Beaton | (United Kingdom of Great Britain and Ireland) British North America | The ship was wrecked at Souris, Prince Edward Island. |
| Four Friends | United Kingdom | The ship ran aground on the Warden Ledge, in the English Channel off the Isle of Wight. Her crew were rescued. She was on a voyage from Guernsey, Channel Islands to Hull, Yorkshire. |
| Jane and Mary | United Kingdom | The ship was driven ashore west of Sanlúcar de Barrameda. She was on a voyage from Seville, Spain to London. |
| Paradise | United Kingdom | The ship was driven ashore and severely damaged at Fiume, Austrian Empire. |

== 28 November ==
List of shipwrecks: 28 November 1842
| Ship | State | Description |
|---|---|---|
| Aisthorpe | United Kingdom | The ship struck a sunken rock in Loch Indaal and was beached. She was on a voyage from Saint John, New Brunswick, British North America to Dundalk, County Louth. |
| Forbin | France | The ship was driven ashore and wrecked near the "Farrenaw Lighthouse" with the loss of all but one of her crew. She was on a voyage from Marans, Charente-Maritime to Toulon, Var. |
| George Clarke | United Kingdom | The ship was driven ashore at Danzig. |
| Goede | Netherlands | The ship was run aground and was abandoned off the coast of Friesland. She was on a voyage from Odesa to Zaandijk, North Holland. |
| Hannah | United Kingdom | The ship was driven ashore at Bridlington, Yorkshire. Her crew were rescued. She was on a voyage from London to South Shields, County Durham. |
| Hannah | United Kingdom | The ship was driven ashore south of Bridlington. She was on a voyage from Guernsey, Channel Islands to South Shields. She was refloated the next day and taken into Bridlington. |
| Hope | United Kingdom | The schooner was abandoned in the Irish Sea off The Skerries, Anglesey. Her crew were rescued by Margaret (United Kingdom). |
| Lady Huntington | United Kingdom | The ship was wrecked in the Tusket Islands, Nova Scotia, British North America. Her crew were rescued. She was on a voyage from New York, United States to Yarmouth, Nova Scotia. |
| Manuel | France | The ship was driven ashore and wrecked west of Newhaven, Sussex, United Kingdom with the loss of all hands. |
| Nova Amizade | Portugal | The brig was driven ashore at Lisbon. She was on a voyage from Rio de Janeiro, Brazil to Lisbon. |
| Richmond | United Kingdom | The schooner was driven ashore and wrecked at Kijkduin, South Holland, Netherlands. She was on a voyage from Rio de la Hacha, Republic of New Granada to Amsterdam, North Holland, Netherlands. |
| Seal Hunter | (United Kingdom of Great Britain and Ireland) British North America | The ship was driven ashore on "Langlais Island with the loss of all but two of those on board. She was on a voyage from Saint John's, Newfoundland to Halifax, Nova Scotia. |
| Tremont | United States | The brig was driven ashore at Holmes Hole, Massachusetts. |
| Truganini | (United Kingdom of Great Britain and Ireland) New South Wales | The schooner was wrecked in Lady Bay. Her crew survived. She was on a voyage from Port Phillip, South Australia to Hobart, Van Diemen's Land. |
| Virginia | United States | The ship was driven ashore near Willemstad, North Brabant, Netherlands. She was on a voyage from Brouwershaven, Zeeland to Rotterdam, South Holland. |
| Wexford | United Kingdom | The barque or brig was wrecked at St Ubes, Portugal. Her crew were rescued. She was on a voyage from Newport, Monmouthshire to Malta. |
| X. L. | United Kingdom | The ship ran aground at Grado, Kingdom of Lombardy–Venetia. She was refloated on 29 November. |

== 29 November ==
List of shipwrecks: 29 November 1842
| Ship | State | Description |
|---|---|---|
| Alfred | United Kingdom | The ship was wrecked in the Gut of Canso. She was on a voyage from Prince Edward Island, British North America to Bristol, Gloucestershire. |
| Bellona | United Kingdom | The barque was wrecked at Kamouraska, Province of Canada, British North America with the loss of two lives. |
| Craigievar | United Kingdom | The brig-rigged steamship was driven ashore at "Hansted". Her crew were rescued. She was on a voyage from Saint Petersburg, Russia to London. |
| Emmanuel | France | The smack was driven ashore and wrecked west of Newhaven, Sussex, United Kingdom with the loss of all hands. She was on a voyage from Isigny-sur-Mer, Calvados to Barfleur, Manche. |
| HMS Formidable | Royal Navy | The Canopus-class ship of the line ran aground off the mouth of the Llobregat on the coast of Spain. She was refloated on 2 December with the aid of two French steamships. |
| Fox | United Kingdom | The ship capsized and sank in a squall. Her crew were rescued. She was on a voyage from Portsmouth to Southampton, Hampshire. |
| Perseverance | United Kingdom | The Yorkshire Billyboy foundered in the English Channel off the coast of Dorset. |
| Prazereze Triumfo | Portugal | The heate was wrecked at Caminha. She was on a voyage from Lisbon to Porto. |

== 30 November ==
List of shipwrecks: 30 November 1842
| Ship | State | Description |
|---|---|---|
| Enterprise | United Kingdom | The ship departed from Catania, Sicily for London. Presumed subsequently foundered in the Atlantic Ocean with the loss of all hands. A boat from the ship was found in the English Channel 57 nautical miles (106 km) south of The Lizard, Cornwall on 15 April 1843 by Lady Mary Wood (United Kingdom). |
| James Clark | United Kingdom | The ship was driven ashore and wrecked at Rye, New York, United States with the loss of six lives. She was on a voyage from Saint John, New Brunswick, British North America to Boston, Massachusetts, United States. |
| Perseverance | United Kingdom | The ship departed from Newport, Monmouthshire for Pembroke. No further trace, presumed foundered with the loss of all hands. |
| Rising Sun | (United Kingdom of Great Britain and Ireland) British North America | The ship was driven ashore at Fortune Bay, Newfoundland. She was consequently condemned. |
| Tay | United Kingdom | The ship was wrecked on the Elbow End Bank, in the North Sea off the coast of Forfarshire. Her crew were rescued. She was on a voyage from Charleston, South Carolina, United States to Dundee, Forfarshire. |
| Tigress | United Kingdom | The ship was last sighted on this date in the Pacific Ocean. Presumed foundered in a typhoon. |
| Vineyard | (United Kingdom of Great Britain and Ireland) British North America | The schooner departed from Shepody, New Brunswick for Saint John, New Brunswick. Possibly driven ashore and wrecked at Eastport, Maine, United States. |

== Unknown date ==
List of shipwrecks: Unknown date in November 1842
| Ship | State | Description |
|---|---|---|
| Aberdeen | United Kingdom | The ship was driven ashore on Green Island, British North America. |
| Amalia | Prussia | The ship was driven ashore on the Swedish coast. Her crew were rescued. She was consequently condemned. |
| Aristipo | Greece | The brig was lost at Sulina, Ottoman Empire. |
| Auguste | United Kingdom | The ship was driven ashore on the coast of New Jersey, United States before 8 November. She was on a voyage from Jamaica to New York, United States. She was refloated on 16 November. |
| Benezet | United States | The whaler was wrecked in the Fiji Islands. Her crew were rescued. |
| Bon Père | France | The ship was driven ashore at Saint-Martin-de-Ré, Charente-Maritime. She was refloated on 1 December and taken into Saint-Martin-de-Ré. |
| Breeze | (United Kingdom of Great Britain and Ireland) British North America | The ship was driven ashore at Halifax, Nova Scotia. |
| Briton | United Kingdom | The ship was driven ashore on Green Island. She was refloated in mid-May 1843 and taken into Quebec City, Province of Canada. She arrived on 14 May. |
| Casper Hauser | United Kingdom | The brig foundered. Her crew were rescued by the barque Cowper. |
| Conero | Papal States | The ship was driven ashore on the coast of Sicily. She was on a voyage from Liverpool, Lancashire, United Kingdom to Ancona. Conero was refloated later refloated and taken into Trapani, Sicily for repairs. |
| Cuba | Texas | The brig foundered in the Atlantic Ocean with the loss of all hands. She was on a voyage from Texas to New York, United States. |
| Diana | Russia | The schooner was lost on the Black Sea coast of the Ottoman Empire. |
| Eleanor | United Kingdom | The ship was driven ashore at Arkhangelsk, Russia before 8 November. She was on a voyage from Onega, Russia to a British port. |
| Elizabeth and Mary | United Kingdom | The ship departed from Lancaster, Lancashire for Stranraer, Wigtownshire. No further trace, presumed foundered with the loss of all hands. |
| Espeigle | France | The ship was wrecked on Newfoundland, British North America. |
| Euclid | United Kingdom | The ship was driven ashore on Goose Island, British North America. |
| Feronia | United Kingdom | The ship was driven ashore at St Peters Harbour, Nova Scotia before 7 November. |
| Francis Lord | United States | The brig foundered in the Atlantic Ocean off the coast of North Carolina. |
| General Rapp | France | The ship sprang a leak and foundered at sea. |
| George Ramsey | United Kingdom | The ship was driven ashore at Cacona, Province of Canada, British North America. She was refloated in mid-May 1843 and taken into Quebec City. She arrived on 14 May. |
| Gleaner | United Kingdom | The ship ran aground in the Saint Lawrence River. She was on a voyage from Quebec City, Province of Canada to London. |
| Henrietta | (United Kingdom of Great Britain and Ireland) Isle of Man | The ship departed from Ramsey for Liverpool, Lancashire in mid-November. No further trace, presumed foundered with the loss of all hands. |
| Ipswich | United Kingdom | The ship was wrecked on the west coast of Newfoundland with the loss of her captain. |
| Isabella | United Kingdom | The brig was abandoned before 2 November. Her crew took to the boats and were rescued on that date by Helen (United Kingdom) when 40 nautical miles (74 km) south east of Palma, Mallorca, Spain. Isabella was on a voyage from London to Calcutta, India. |
| Italia | Papal States | The ship was wrecked at Cape Catino, Grand Duchy of Tuscany before 14 November. All on board were rescued. She was on a voyage from Genoa, Kingdom of Sardinia to Civitavecchia. |
| Joanna | United Kingdom | The barque was driven ashore and wrecked on Heron Island, New Brunswick between 21 and 26 November. |
| Leven Lass | United Kingdom | The ship was driven ashore on Green Island. |
| London Packet | United States | The whaler was holed by a swordfish and was beached in the Bay of Islands. |
| Mary | United Kingdom | The ship was wrecked on St Peters Island, British North America. |
| Mary and Agnes | United Kingdom | The ship was driven ashore at Shoreham-by-Sea, Sussex. She was refloated on 20 November and taken into Shoreham-by-Sea. |
| Minerva | United Kingdom | The ship ran aground and sank in the Faroe Islands. Her crew were rescued. She was on a voyage from Saint Petersburg, Russia to Belfast, County Antrim. |
| Minerva | United Kingdom | The brig capsized in the Baltic Sea 60 nautical miles (110 km) west of Memel, Prussia before 20 November. |
| Native | United Kingdom | The schooner was deliberately scuttled in the English Channel off the coast of Dorset. She was purported to be on a voyage from Lymington, Hampshire to Limerick. |
| Nonpareil | United States | The steamboat sank in the Mississippi River before 24 November. |
| Plato | United States | The barque was driven ashore on the American east coast. |
| Progress | United Kingdom | The schooner capsized and sank off the Gunfleet Sand. Her crew were rescued. She was on a voyage from Goole, Yorkshire to London. |
| Providence | United Kingdom | The ship collided with the brig Cousens (United Kingdom) and sank in the River Thames at Erith, Kent. She was on a voyage from London to Leeds, Yorkshire. She was later refloated and beached. |
| Resolution | United Kingdom | The barque ran aground in the Saint Lawrence River downstream of Matane, Province of Canada, where she subsequently became a wreck. She was on a voyage from London to Quebec City, Province of Canada. |
| Retrieve | United Kingdom | The schooner was driven ashore at Portland, Oregon, United States. She was refloated on 22 November. |
| Royal Albert | United Kingdom | The ship foundered in the Irish Sea east of the Isle of Man on or before 9 November. Wreckage from the ship washed up at Groudle Glen on that date. |
| Shrimp | United Kingdom | The sailing barge was abandoned off the coast of Essex. She was subsequently taken into Wivenhoe. |
| St. David | United Kingdom | The ship was wrecked on Howe Island, in the Saint Lawrence River. She was on a voyage from Kingston, Jamaica to Montreal, Province of Canada. |
| Susan Drew | United States | The ship was driven ashore on the Irish Lump, off New Orleans, Louisiana, before 2 November. |
| Susannah | United Kingdom | The ship was abandoned in the Atlantic Ocean. Her crew were rescued by William ( (United Kingdom of Great Britain and Ireland) Jersey. |
| Tappanovey | United States | The ship ran aground of a reef off Bermuda. She was on a voyage from Newhaven, Connecticut, to Barbados. She was refloated and taken into Bermuda. |
| Welsford | United Kingdom | The ship was driven ashore on Green Island before 22 November. She was on a voyage from Quebec City, Province of Canada to London. She was refloated in May 1843 and put back to Quebec City, where she arrived on 20 May. |
