= List of shipwrecks in November 1843 =

The list of shipwrecks in November 1843 includes ships sunk, foundered, wrecked, grounded, or otherwise lost during November 1843.

== 1 November ==
List of shipwrecks: November 1843
Ship	State	Description
Fastemoen	Norway	The ship foundered off Tonsberg, Duchy of Holstein with the loss of her captain.
Jonge Smit	Prussia	The ship foundered in the Dogger Bank. Her crew were rescued. She was on a voyage from Kiel to King's Lynn, Norfolk, United Kingdom.

== 2 November ==
List of shipwrecks: 2 November 1843
Ship	State	Description
Augusta	Norway	The ship was driven ashore near Bergen. She was on a voyage from Bergen to Genoa, Kingdom of Sardinia. She was refloated the next day and towed into Bergen.
Franklin	United Kingdom	The ship ran aground in the Mississippi River.
Maria	(United Kingdom of Great Britain and Ireland) British North America	The schooner was wrecked in the Cardigan River. She was on a voyage from Ship Harbour, Nova Scotia to Prince Edward Island.
Pubertad	Republic of New Granada	The sloop was wrecked at Scarborough, Tobago.
William and Ann	United Kingdom	The ship ran aground on the Goodwin Sands, Kent. She was on a voyage from Rouen, Seine-Inférieure, France to South Shields, County Durham. She was refloated and put in to Ramsgate, Kent in a leaky condition.

== 3 November ==
List of shipwrecks: 3 November 1843
Ship	State	Description
Alexandria	Netherlands	The ship was driven ashore on Texel, North Holland. She was on a voyage from Riga, Russia to Amsterdam, North Holland.
Anna	United Kingdom	The ship was wrecked on Hogland, Russia. She was on a voyage from Saint Petersburg, Russia to London.
Georgiana	United Kingdom	The ship was driven ashore in the "Tumbalin Islands". She was on a voyage from Liverpool, Lancashire to New York, United States. She was later refloated.
Herstelling	Netherlands	The ship was wrecked near Ystad, Sweden. Her crew were rescued. She was on a voyage from Riga to Amsterdam.
Rosalie	France	The sloop ran aground near Cuxhaven. She was refloated and resumed her voyage.
Sophie	United Kingdom	The ship sank in the River Ouse at Goole, Yorkshire. She was refloated on 8 November.
Susannah	United Kingdom	The ship struck the Kish Bank, in the Irish Sea and foundered 0.5 nautical miles (930 m) north north east of the Kish Bank Lightship ( Trinity House). Her crew were rescued. She was on a voyage from Bangor to London.

== 4 November ==
List of shipwrecks: 4 November 1843
Ship	State	Description
Franklin	United Kingdom	The ship ran aground in the Mississippi River. She was on a voyage from New Orleans, Louisiana, United States to Liverpool, Lancashire.
Java	United Kingdom	The ship was wrecked near Cape Chat, Province of Canada, British North America. Her crew were rescued. She was on a voyage from Quebec City, Province of Canada to Chatham, Kent.
Lord Coke	United Kingdom	The ship was driven ashore at Mundesley, Norfolk. She was refloated and towed in to Great Yarmouth, Norfolk.
Premier	United Kingdom	The transport ship was driven ashore and wrecked near Cape Chat. All on board were rescued by the steamship Unicorn (United Kingdom). She was on a voyage from Quebec City to Barbados.
Rebecca	United Kingdom	The sloop was in collision with the brig Celerity (United Kingdom) and sank in the North Sea off the mouth of the River Tees. Her crew were rescued. She was on a voyage from Middlesbrough to Redcar, Yorkshire.
Rosas	Peru	The barque foundered in the Pacific Ocean 100 leagues (300 nautical miles (560 km) west of the Islay Province. Five of her crew reached "Pesco" in one of the boats.
Thomas Tattersall	United Kingdom	The ship ran aground at Dundalk, County Louth. She was on a voyage from Liverpool, Lancashire to Swansea, Glamorgan.

== 5 November ==
List of shipwrecks: 5 November 1843
Ship	State	Description
Abraham	United Kingdom	The ship ran aground near Redcar, Yorkshire. She was on a voyage from South Shields, County Durham to Weymouth, Dorset. She was refloated and resumed her voyage.
Brothers	United Kingdom	The ship was driven ashore at Fraserburgh, Aberdeenshire. She was refloated.
Elizabeth	United Kingdom	The ship ran aground near Redcar. She was on a voyage from Seaham, County Durham to Wisbech, Cambridgeshire. She was refloated and resumed her voyage.
Pride	(United Kingdom of Great Britain and Ireland) British North America	The schooner was wrecked at Owls Head, Nova Scotia. She was on a voyage from St. Mary's to Halifax.
Rambler	United Kingdom	The ship was driven ashore on Læsø, Denmark. She was on a voyage from Saint Petersburg, Russia to London. She was later refloated and resumed her voyage.

== 6 November ==
List of shipwrecks: 6 November 1843
Ship	State	Description
Antina	Hamburg	The ship was driven ashore on Langeoog, Kingdom of Hanover. Her crew were rescued.
Factor	United Kingdom	The ship ran aground in the River Shannon. She was on a voyage from Bristol, Gloucestershire to Limerick.
Fleurus	France	The whaler was wrecked in Providence Bay, Strait of Magellan. Her crew were rescued. She was on a voyage from Havre de Grâce, Seine-Inférieure to the South Seas.
Gustave	Belgium	The ship struck the quayside at Antwerp and was severely damaged. She was on a voyage from Liverpool, Lancashire, United Kingdom to Antwerp.
Lovens Aanel	Norway	The ship ran aground and sank off Hals, Denmark. Her crew were rescued. She was on a voyage from Randers to Dram.
Mersey	United Kingdom	The ship ran aground on the Eclat, in the English Channel. She was on a voyage from Newcastle upon Tyne, Northumberland to Rouen, Seine-Inférieure, France. She was refloated and put in to Havre de Grâce, Seine-Inférieure.
Olive Branch	United Kingdom	The brig was destroyed by fire off Cape Chat, Province of Canada, British North America. Her crew were rescued.
St. Jorgen	Hamburg	The ship was driven ashore on Hirsholmene, Denmark. She was on a voyage from Altona to Aarhus, Denmark. She was refloated and put into Fredrikshavn.
Venus	United Kingdom	The ship ran aground at Bideford, Devon. She was on a voyage from Bideford to Cardiff, Glamorgan.

== 7 November ==
List of shipwrecks: 7 November 1843
Ship	State	Description
August	France	The ship was driven ashore at Havre de Grâce, Seine Maritime. She was on a voyage from Ostend, West Flanders, Belgium to Havre de Grâce.
Conference	United Kingdom	The ship was driven ashore on Keri, Russia. She was on a voyage from Saint Petersburg, Russia to London. She was refloated on 10 November and taken into Reval.
Hetty	United Kingdom	The schooner was driven ashore at Formby, Lancashire. She was on a voyage from Dundalk, County Louth to Preston, Lancashire. She was refloated on 11 November and towed into Lytham St Annes, Lancashire.
Marion	United Kingdom	The barque was wrecked at Tampico, Mexico. Her crew were rescued. She was on a voyage from Liverpool, Lancashire to Tampico.
Mary Jane	United States	The schooner was wrecked on the Sandy Island Reef, off the coast of Antigua.
Queen Elizabeth	United Kingdom	The ship was driven ashore on the east coast of Saint Thomas, Virgin Islands with the loss of four of her crew.

== 8 November ==
List of shipwrecks: 8 November 1843
Ship	State	Description
Annette	Sweden	The ship ran aground in the Danzy Channel. Her crew were rescued. She was on a voyage from Norrköping to Sundsvall.
James	United Kingdom	The ship ran aground on the Brake Sand, in the North Sea off the coast of Kent. She was on a voyage from St. John's, Newfoundland, British North America to London. She was refloated and resumed her voyage.
Jane and Betsey	United Kingdom	The ship ran aground and sank in the English Channel. Her crew were rescued. She was on a voyage from Glasgow, Renfrewshire to Rouen, Seine-Inférieure, France.
Lisette	Stettin	The ship sprang a leak and foundered in the North Sea. Her crew were rescued by a Dutch ship. She was on a voyage from Peterhead, Aberdeenshire, United Kingdom to Stettin.
Royalist	United Kingdom	The ship was driven ashore on Saltholm, Denmark. She was on a voyage from Riga, Russia to Hull, Yorkshire. She was refloated and resumed her voyage.
Volunteer	United Kingdom	The ship ran aground on the Swadman Reef, in the North Sea off the coast of County Durham. She was on a voyage from Charlestown, Fife to London. She was refloated and resumed her voyage.

== 9 November ==
List of shipwrecks: 9 November 1843
Ship	State	Description
Five Sisters	United Kingdom	The ship struck the Lee Bar Shoal, off the coast of Cornwall and sank. She was on a voyage from Havre de Grâce, Seine-Inférieure to Dublin.
Iris	Hamburg	The ship was driven ashore at "St. David's", Fife, United Kingdom. She was on a voyage from St. David's to Hamburg.
Navarino	Portugal	The ship ran aground on a reef off Bermuda. She was on a voyage from New York, United States to Porto. She was consequently condemned.
Neeltje	Duchy of Holstein	The ship foundered off Borkum, Kingdom of Hanover. Her crew were rescued. She was on a voyage from Flensburg to Brancaster, Norfolk, United Kingdom.
Richard Reynolds	United Kingdom	The ship ran aground entering the East Country Dock, London and was wrecked. She was on a voyage from Quebec City, Province of Canada, British North America to London.
San Francisco Xavier	France	The brig was wrecked at Tampico, Mexico.
Sophia	United Kingdom	The ship was in collision with a dredging machine and sank in the River Ouse. She was on a voyage from Great Yarmouth, Norfolk to Goole, Yorkshire. She was refloated on 11 November.
Superb	United Kingdom	The ship was abandoned in the North Sea. Her crew took to the boat and were rescued by a Danish vessel. She was on a voyage from Hull, Yorkshire to Bremen.
Trent	(United Kingdom of Great Britain and Ireland) New Zealand	The schooner foundered, off the coast of New Zealand's North Island, with the loss of all four crew. The ship was en route from Tauranga to Auckland. Her empty lifeboat was found on a beach but no sign was found of the ship. Some sources state the location of the wreck as being Poverty Bay, but given the ship's course, this is highly unlikely.
Will Watch	United Kingdom	The ship was driven ashore and severely damaged east of Burnham Overy Staithe, Norfolk. She was refloated on 19 November and taken in to Wells-next-the-Sea.

== 10 November ==
List of shipwrecks: 10 November 1843
Ship	State	Description
Concordia	Netherlands	The ship was in collision with the galiot Diana (Kingdom of Hanover) and sank off Borkum, Kingdom of Hanover. Her crew were rescued. She was on a voyage from Amsterdam, North Holland to Hamburg.
Endeavour	United Kingdom	The ship was wrecked in the North Sea. Her crew were rescued. She was on a voyage from Sunderland, County Durham to Antwerp, Belgium.
Saracen	United Kingdom	The ship was wrecked near Terranova de Sicilia, Sicily. Her crew were rescued. She was on a voyage from Fowey, Cornwall to Venice, Kingdom of Lombardy–Venetia.
Vrede	Netherlands	The ship was wrecked at Callantsoog, North Holland with the loss of six of her eight crew. She was on a voyage from Grangemouth, Stirlingshire, United Kingdom to Amsterdam, North Holland.

== 11 November ==
List of shipwrecks: 11 November 1843
Ship	State	Description
Archimède	French Navy	The paddle corvette ran aground in the River Thames at Charlton, Kent. She was refloated.
Christine	Russia	The ship capsized and sank 7 leagues (21 nautical miles (39 km) southeast of Öland, Sweden. Her crew were rescued by Hebe (United Kingdom). Christine was on a voyage from Riga to Hull, Yorkshire, United Kingdom.
Defiance	(United Kingdom of Great Britain and Ireland) British North America	The ship was driven ashore in Cascumpec Bay. She was on a voyage from Georgetown, Prince Edward Island to Quebec City, Province of Canada.
King of the Forest	United Kingdom	The ship ran aground in the River Suir. She was on a voyage from Waterford to London. She was refloated.
Sheffield	United Kingdom	The ship ran aground on the Ronear Shoals, off the coast of New Jersey, United States. All on board, more than 140 people, were rescued. She was on a voyage from Liverpool, Lancashire to New York, United States. She was refloated and taken into New York.

== 12 November ==
List of shipwrecks: 12 November 1843
Ship	State	Description
Charles Heseltine	United States	The ship was wrecked near Cape Hatteras, North Carolina. Her crew were rescued. She was on a voyage from Trinidad to Alexandria, Virginia.
Exchange	United Kingdom	The ship was los 80 nautical miles (150 km) north of Heligoland. Her crew were rescued. She was on a voyage from Goole, Yorkshire to Hamburg.
Leipsic Packet	United Kingdom	The schooner ran aground and sank at Broadstairs, Kent. She was on a voyage from Hartlepool, County Durham to London.
Rosanna	United Kingdom	The ship ran aground in the River Liffey and was damaged. She was on a voyage from Onega, Russia to Dublin.

== 13 November ==
List of shipwrecks: 13 November 1843
Ship	State	Description
Elvensure	France	The ship was driven ashore at "Cape Carenne" and was abandoned by her crew. She was on a voyage from Marseille, Bouches-du-Rhône to Antwerp, Belgium. Elvensure later floated off and drove out to sea.
Industry	United Kingdom	The sloop ran aground on the Easter Vows Rock, in the Firth of Forth and was abandoned by her crew. She was on a voyage from Newcastle upon Tyne, Northumberland to Leith, Lothian.
Perle	Prussia	The ship ran aground off "Kronburg", Denmark. She was on a voyage from Memel to London, United Kingdom. She was refloated.
Vandringsmanden	Sweden	The ship was abandoned in the North Sea 30 nautical miles (56 km) off the coast of Friesland, Netherlands. Her crew were rescued. She was on a voyage from Gothenburg to Calais, France.

== 14 November ==
List of shipwrecks: 14 November 1843
Ship	State	Description
Apollo	Netherlands	The ship departed from Sunderland, County Durham, United Kingdom for Amsterdam, North Holland. No further trace, presumed foundered with the loss of all hands.
D. R. Martin	United States	The ship departed from La Rochelle, Charente-Maritime, France for Boston, Massachusetts. No further trace, presumed foundered with the loss of all hands.

== 15 November ==
List of shipwrecks: 15 November 1843
Ship	State	Description
Aigle	France	The ship departed from La Rochelle, Charente-Maritime for New York, United States. No further trace, presumed foundered in the Atlantic Ocean with the loss of all hands.
Laurel	United Kingdom	The ship was driven ashore near Dénia, Spain. She was on a voyage from Marseille, Bouches-du-Rhône, France to Falmouth, Cornwall. She was refloated on 18 November and take into Dénia.
Margaret	United Kingdom	The ship was driven ashore west of Cullen, Morayshire. Her crew were rescued. She was on a voyage from a port in Caithness to Lossiemouth, Morayshire.

== 16 November ==
List of shipwrecks: 16 November 1843
Ship	State	Description
Aurora	United Kingdom	The ship struck the pier at Great Yarmouth, Norfolk and was damaged. She was on a voyage from Great Yarmouth to South Shields, County Durham.
Dunns	United Kingdom	The schooner capsized in the North Sea with the loss of all three crew. She was on a voyage from Filey, Yorkshire to Blyth, Northumberland.
Fanny	United Kingdom	The ship was wrecked on the Banche. She was on a voyage from London to Saint-Nazaire, Loire-Inférieure, France.
Henre Dorothee	France	The ship was driven ashore north of "Sante", Algeria.
Janette	United Kingdom	The ship was driven ashore on Fehmarn, Duchy of Schleswig. She was on a voyage form Stettin to Hull, Yorkshire. She was refloated and resumed her voyage.
Jenny	United Kingdom	The ship was driven ashore at Margate, Kent. She was refloated on 19 November and taken in to Margate.

== 17 November ==
List of shipwrecks: 17 November 1843
Ship	State	Description
Aylesford	United Kingdom	The ship was driven ashore on Gotland, Sweden. Her crew were rescued. She was on a voyage from Saint Petersburg, Russia to Arbroath, Forfarshire. She subsequently became a wreck.
Ebenezer	United Kingdom	The ship was driven ashore at Fishguard, Pembrokeshire. She was on a voyage from Newport, Monmouthshire to Liverpool, Lancashire. She became a wreck on 19 November.
Elizabeth	(United Kingdom of Great Britain and Ireland) Swan River Colony	The schooner was driven ashore and wrecked at Bunbury. Her crew survived.
Enchantress	United Kingdom	The ship was driven ashore and wrecked east of Cape Palos, Spain. She was on a voyage from Naples, Kingdom of the Two Sicilies to Newcastle upon Tyne, Northumberland.
Fairfield	(United Kingdom of Great Britain and Ireland) British North America	The ship was lost on Cape Breton Island, Nova Scotia. Her crew were rescued. She was on a voyage from Saint John, New Brunswick to Sydney, Nova Scotia.
Jane Haddow	United Kingdom	The ship was driven ashore in the River Mersey. She was on a voyage from Chaleur Bay to the Clyde. She was refloated and taken in to Liverpool, Lancashire in a waterlogged condition.
Kelburne	United Kingdom	The smack foundered off Toward Point, Argyllshire. Her crew were rescued.
Kerman	United Kingdom	The brig was wrecked on Gotland. She was on a voyage from Riga, Russia to Sheerness, Kent.
Mary Ann	(United Kingdom of Great Britain and Ireland) British North America	The ship was lost at Torbay, Newfoundland. Her crew were rescued. She was on a voyage from Sydney, Nova Scotia to Halifax, Nova Scotia.
Newland	United Kingdom	The ship was lost off the Sandhammaren Lighthouse, Ystad, Sweden. Her crew were rescued. She was on a voyage from "Wyberg" to Newcastle upon Tyne.
Sarah and Marianne	United Kingdom	The brig was in collision with the schooner Quiz (United Kingdom) and foundered in the Irish Sea 30 nautical miles (56 km) west south west of the Calf of Man, Isle of Man. Her ten crew were rescued by the barque Cruickston Castle and the schooner Mischief (both United Kingdom). Sarah Mary Anne was on a voyage from Dublin to Annan, Dumfriesshire.
True Blue	United Kingdom	The ship struck the Thistle Rock. She consequently put in to Gothenburg, Sweden in a leaky condition.
Vigilant	United Kingdom	The ship departed from Maldon, Essex for Goole, Yorkshire. No further trace, presumed foundered in the North Sea with the loss of all hands.

== 18 November ==
List of shipwrecks: 18 November 1843
Ship	State	Description
Baltic	United Kingdom	The ship ran aground in the River Severn at Sharpness, Gloucestershire and was damaged. She was on a voyage from Gloucester to Cardiff, Glamorgan.
Cambridge	United Kingdom	The barque was driven onto the Batten Reef, off the coast of Devon. She was later refloated and taken in to Plymouth for repairs.
Charlotte	United Kingdom	The ship struck rocks off Brekkestø, Norway and sank with the loss of five of her crew. She was on a voyage from Saint Petersburg, Russia to Liverpool, Lancashire.
Cocket	United Kingdom	The ship ran aground on the Falsterbo Reef, in the Baltic Sea. She was on a voyage from Saint Petersburg to Newcastle upon Tyne, Northumberland. She was refloated and put into Helsingør, Denmark.
Hampton	United Kingdom	The ship ran aground and was damaged at Cardigan. She was on a voyage from Liverpool to Marseille, Bouches-du-Rhône, France. Hampton was refloated.
Jirah or Lyra	United Kingdom	The schooner collided with Hampshire (United Kingdom and foundered in the North Sea 5 nautical miles (9.3 km) south of Flamborough Head, Yorkshire with the loss of two of her four crew. Survivors were rescued by Eleanor (United Kingdom).
Mary Ann Sprague	(United Kingdom of Great Britain and Ireland) British North America	The schooner was wrecked off Country Harbour, Nova Scotia. Her crew were rescued. She was on a voyage from Pictou, Nova Scotia to Richibucto, New Brunswick.
Traveller	United Kingdom	The ship was driven ashore at Cefalù, Sicily. She was on a voyage from Palermo to Cefalù.
William Hamley	(United Kingdom of Great Britain and Ireland) Guernsey	The ship was wrecked on the Goodwin Sands, Kent. Her crew were rescued. She was on a voyage from Newcastle upon Tyne, Northumberland to Guernsey.

== 19 November ==
List of shipwrecks: 19 November 1843
Ship	State	Description
Advocate	United Kingdom	The schooner was driven ashore and damaged at Milford Haven, Pembrokeshire. She was on a voyage from Parrsborough, Nova Scotia, British North America to Dublin. Advocate was later refloated.
Albion	United Kingdom	The ship was wrecked near Accumersiel, Kingdom of Hanover. She was on a voyage from Liverpool, Lancashire to Brake, Kingdom of Hanover.
Australia	United Kingdom	The ship ran aground in the Hooghly River upstream of "Ryapore", India.
Cambridge	United Kingdom	The ship was driven ashore and severely damaged in Batten Bay. She was on a voyage from Newcastle upon Tyne, Northumberland to Valparaíso, Chile. She was refloated the next day and taken into Plymouth, Devon for repairs.
Deborah Helena	Rostock	The ship ran aground in the Eider. She was on a voyage from Rouen, Seine-Inférieure, France to Rostock. She was refloated and put into Tönning, Duchy of Holstein for repairs.
Elizabeth	United Kingdom	The ship was driven ashore east of Tenedos Bay. She was later refloated.
Fame	United Kingdom	The schooner sank at Milford Haven. She was on a voyage from Great Yarmouth, Norfolk to the River Dee. She was later refloated.
Henry	United Kingdom	The ship ran aground at Port Talbot, Glamorgan.
Hope	United Kingdom	The ship was driven ashore and severely damaged near Goldcliff, Monmouthsrire. She was on a voyage from Bridgwater, Somerset to Newport, Monmouthshire. She was later refloated and taken into the River Usk.
Juliane	Stettin	The ship was wrecked on Rønne, Denmark. She was on a voyage from Königsberg, Prussia to Bremen.
Mariam	United Kingdom	The ship ran aground in the Hooghly River upstream of Ryapore.
HMRC Skylark	Board of Customs	The ship was driven ashore at "Newton Oyes", Pembrokeshire.
Thorn Tree	United Kingdom	The ship was driven ashore on Læsø, Denmark. She was on a voyage from "Wyburg" to Hull. Yorkshire. She floated off on 9 December and was driven ashore on the Swedish coast, where she was wrecked.
Trident	United Kingdom	The schooner sank at Milford Haven. She was later refloated.
William	United Kingdom	The sloop collided with Advocate (United Kingdom and sank at Milford Haven. She was later refloated.

== 20 November ==
List of shipwrecks: 20 November 1843
Ship	State	Description
Bernard	United Kingdom	The ship was wrecked near "Miloath Point" with the loss of fifteen lives. She was on a voyage from Quebec City, Province of Canada, British North America to Chatham, Kent.
Commerce	United Kingdom	The ship foundered in the North Sea off Ostend, West Flanders, Belgium with the loss of four of her five crew. She was on a voyage from London to Antwerp, Belgium.
Hannah	United Kingdom	The ship was driven ashore and wrecked at Orford, Suffolk. Her crew were rescued. She was on a voyage from Danzig to Ipswich, Suffolk.
Industry	United Kingdom	The smack sank at Southend, Essex.
Louis Philippe	France	The fishing vessel was driven ashore at Dungeness, Kent, United Kingdom with the loss of two of her 21 crew.
Margaret	United Kingdom	The schooner was driven ashore 25 nautical miles (46 km) west of Alexandria, Egypt. She was abandoned by her crew when they were threatened by armed Arabs.
Mercurius	Denmark	The ship was driven ashore and wrecked at Slettestrand near Thisted, Denmark. She was on a voyage from Aalborg, Denmark to Altona.
Oak	United Kingdom	The ship was driven ashore and wrecked at Great Yarmouth, Norfolk. Her crew were rescued. She was on a voyage from Spalding, Lincolnshire to London.
Octorara	United States	The ship was driven ashore at Whitebooth, Yorkshire, United Kingdom. She was on a voyage from New York to Hull, Yorkshire. She was refloated.
Providence	United Kingdom	The ship was abandoned in the North Sea east north east of Spurn Point, Yorkshire. Her crew were rescued by Trinity (United Kingdom).
Regent	United Kingdom	The ship was driven ashore at Dungeness, Kent. She was on a voyage from London to Shoreham-by-Sea, Sussex. She was refloated and taken into Ramsgate, Kent.
Rob Roy	United Kingdom	The ship ran aground east of Dunbar, Lothian. She was on a voyage from Rotterdam, South Holland, Netherlands to Grangemouth, Stirlingshire. She was refloated and resumed her voyage.
Sir John Franklin	United Kingdom	The ship was driven ashore at Odesa. She was refloated on 27 November.
Waterhen	United Kingdom	The ship was driven ashore near Dymchurch, Kent. Her crew were rescued. She was on a voyage from Newhaven, Sussex to Dover, Kent.
William and Mary	United Kingdom	The smack sank in the Ferry Boat Dock, Hull. Her crew were rescued.

== 21 November ==
List of shipwrecks: 21 November 1843
Ship	State	Description
Adonis	Lübeck	The ship was driven ashore in Åland. She was on a voyage from Lübeck to Pori, Grand Duchy of Finland.
Caroline	United Kingdom	The barque was wrecked near Goldsboro, Maryland with the loss of all but four of the 22 people on board. She was on a voyage from Grenada to Saint John, New Brunswick, British North America.
Challenger	United Kingdom	The ship struck a sunken rock and was wrecked off Bryher, Isles of Scilly. Her crew were rescued. She was on a voyage from Smyrna, Ottoman Empire to London.
Diana	United Kingdom	The ship was driven onto the Perches, in the Irish Sea off the coast of Cumberland and then driven ashore north of Workington. She was on a voyage from Drogheda, County Louth to Workington.
Diligence	United Kingdom	The ship was driven ashore at "Clare", Ireland. She was on a voyage from Llanelly, Glamorgan to Limerick Diligence subsequently floated off and sank.
Dutton	United Kingdom	The ship foundered off the Isle of May. Her crew were rescued by Rob Roy (United Kingdom). Dutton was on a voyage from South Shields, County Durham to Inverness.
Elizabeth and Mary	United Kingdom	The sloop foundered in the Dogger Bank. Three crew were rescued. She was on a voyage from Colchester, Essex to Hull, Yorkshire.
Fountain	United Kingdom	The ship foundered in the North Sea with loss of life.
Glasgow	United Kingdom	The ship was wrecked off Sylt, Duchy of Schleswig. Her crew survived. She was on a voyage from Cuxhaven to Leith, Lothian.
Josephine	United Kingdom	The ship was driven ashore in the Saint Lawrence River. She was on a voyage from Quebec City, Province of Canada, British North America to the Clyde.
Lady Clinton	United Kingdom	The ship was driven ashore at Filey Bridge, Yorkshire. She was on a voyage from Dover, Kent to South Shields. Lady Clinton floated off on 6 December and sank.
Mary	United Kingdom	The full-rigged ship was wrecked on Loughlin's Reef, off Woodlark Island with the loss of seven of her 36 crew. Twenty-seven of the survivors were subsequently massacred by the inhabitants of Woodlark Island. The survivor was rescued after nine months by the brig Tigress (United Kingdom).
Nicolai I	Russia	The ship was driven ashore at Loviisa, Grand Duchy of Finland.
Thistle	United Kingdom	The ship was wrecked on the Cromer Knock, in the North Sea. Her nine crew took to the boat. They were rescued the next day by Risk (United Kingdom. Thistle was on a voyage from Grangemouth, Stirlingshire to Rotterdam, South Holland, Netherlands.
Venture	United Kingdom	The ship was driven ashore at Ballyshannon, County Donegal.
Wietzima	Netherlands	The ship was sighted in the Øresund whilst on a voyage from Danzig to Amsterdam, North Holland. No further trace, presumed foundered with the loss of all hands.
Yandero	United Kingdom	The ship was in collision with Aldrin in the North Sea and was abandoned by her crew. She was on a voyage from Grangemouth to Dordrecht, South Holland, Netherlands. Yandero was discovered on 23 November by Clifton (United Kingdom) and was taken into Hull.

== 22 November ==
List of shipwrecks: November 1843
Ship	State	Description
Alfa	Denmark	The ship was wrecked on the Rukkeboderne Rocks with the loss of a crew member.
Cato	United Kingdom	The ship sprang a leak in the North Sea and was abandoned by her crew. She was on a voyage from Sunderland, County Durham to London. She was subsequently boarded by some fishermen but foundered with the loss of two lives.
Commerce	United Kingdom	The ship was driven ashore and damaged at Whitburn, County Durham. Her crew survived. She was refloated and taken into South Shields, County Durham.
Content	United Kingdom	The ship was driven ashore in the Saint Lawrence River 20 nautical miles (37 km) downstream of Point des Monts, Province of Canada, British North America. Her crew were rescued. She was on a voyage from Trois-Pistoles, Province of Canada to London.
Falcon	United Kingdom	The barque was driven ashore at Portneuf, Province of Canada. She was on a voyage from Quebec City, Province of Canada to Bridgwater, Somerset.
Ferdinand	Russia	The ship foundered in the Baltic Sea off Osmussaar. Her crew were rescued. She was on a voyage from Saint Petersburg to Riga.
Lydia	United Kingdom	The ship ran aground in the River Shannon and was damaged. She was on a voyage from Limerick to London.
Maria	United Kingdom	The ship was driven ashore at Anderby, Lincolnshire. She was on a voyage from "Ronsberg" to King's Lynn, Norfolk. She was refloated and resumed her voyage.
Marie	Norway	The ship was wrecked on Læsø, Denmark. She was on a voyage from Christiansand to Aalborg, Denmark.
Mars	United Kingdom	The ship ran aground in the River Shannon and was damaged. She was on a voyage from Limerick to London.
Mersey	United Kingdom	The ship ran aground in the Saint Lawrence River at Portneuf. Her crew were rescued. She was on a voyage from Quebec City, Province of Canada to Liverpool, Lancashire.
Providence	United Kingdom	The ship ran aground and sank in the Princes Channel. Her crew were rescued. She was on a voyage from Bangor to London.
Sophie	United Kingdom	The ship was driven ashore on Düne, Heligoland and was abandoned by her crew. She was on a voyage from Hull, Yorkshire to Altona. She subsequently floated off and was beached on Heligoland.
Syria	United Kingdom	The ship ran aground on the Crane Island Reef. She was on a voyage from Quebec City to Liverpool. She was later refloated and resumed her voyage.
Williams	United Kingdom	The ship was driven ashore at Scotstown Head, Aberdeenshire. She was on a voyage from Aberdeen to the West Indies. She was refloated and resumed her voyage.

== 23 November ==
List of shipwrecks: 23 November 1843
Ship	State	Description
Agios Dimitrios	Greece	The ship was wrecked in Salina Bay with the loss of all but three of her crew.
Dampier	United Kingdom	The ship was dismasted, sprang a leak and abandoned in the North Sea. Her crew took to the boats and were rescued the next day by Kleine Engelina (Kingdom of Hanover). She was on a voyage from Veracruz, Mexico to Hartlepool, County Durham.
Elizabeth Mary	United Kingdom	The ship was abandoned in the Dogger Bank. Her crew were rescued. She was on a voyage from Colchester, Essex to Hull, Yorkshire.
Jonge Claus	Netherlands	The ship was sighted off Helsingør, Denmark whilst on a voyage from Danzig to Bremen. No further trace, presumed foundered with the loss of all hands.
Marchioness of Queensbury	United Kingdom	The ship ran aground off Heron Island, New Brunswick, British North America.
Sarah	United Kingdom	The ship ran aground on the Whiting Sand, in the North Sea off the coast of Suffolk and was consequently beached at Aldeburgh. She was on a voyage from Newcastle upon Tyne, Northumberland to London.
Sophia	United Kingdom	The ship was discovered derelict and beached on Heligoland. She was on a voyage from Hull to Altona. Sophia subsequently became a wreck.
St. Thomas	Denmark	The ship capsized off Sardinia. She was on a voyage from Copenhagen to Messina, Sicily.
Tempest	United Kingdom	The brig was driven ashore and wrecked on Fårö, Sweden with the loss of all hands.

== 24 November ==
List of shipwrecks: 24 November 1843
Ship	State	Description
Celerity	United Kingdom	The ship was severely damaged on a rock off Whitburn, County Durham. She was refloated with assistance from the steamship Pilot (United Kingdom and towed into South Shields, County Durham.
Priscilla	United Kingdom	The ship was driven ashore at Plymouth, Devon. She was on a voyage from Quebec City, Province of Canada to Plymouth. She was refloated.
St. Thomas	Denmark	The ship capsized off Sardinia with the loss of three of her crew. She was on a voyage from Copenhagen to Messina, Sicily.

== 25 November ==
List of shipwrecks: 25 November 1843
Ship	State	Description
Adele	France	The barque was driven ashore at Culpee, India.
Augusta Frederike	Stettin	The ship was driven ashore on Læsø, Denmark. She was on a voyage from London, United Kingdom to Stettin. She was later refloated.
Floraville	United Kingdom	The ship was wrecked on the James and Mary Sand, in the Hooghly River. She was on a voyage from Penang to Calcutta, India.
Johns	United Kingdom	The ship was driven ashore at Penmon, Anglesey.
Norval	United Kingdom	The ship was wrecked in the River Wye. She was on a voyage from Ross-on-Wye, Herefordshire to Cork.
Oak	United Kingdom	The ship sprang a leak and foundered in the North Sea off Whitby, Yorkshire. Her crew were rescued.
Persian	United Kingdom	The ship ran aground on Scroby Sands, Norfolk. She was on a voyage from Sunderland, County Durham to Algiers, Algeria. She was refloated.
Rover	United Kingdom	The ship was driven ashore and wrecked at Arklow, County Wicklow.

== 26 November ==
List of shipwrecks: 26 November 1843
Ship	State	Description
Daniel O'Connell	United Kingdom	The ship ran aground off Cranberry Isles, Maine, United States. She was on a voyage from Windsor, Province of Canada, British North America to Portland, Maine.
Hannah	United Kingdom	The ship sprang a leak and was beached at Grimsby, Lincolnshire. She was on a voyage from South Shields, County Durham to Naples, Kingdom of the Two Sicilies.
Maria	(United Kingdom of Great Britain and Ireland) British North America	The ship was wrecked in Holland's Bay, Jamaica. Her crew were rescued. She was on a voyage from Saint Andrews, New Brunswick to Jamaica.
Phoenix	United Kingdom	The ship was wrecked on Miquelon-Langlade with the loss of eight lives. She was on a voyage from Miramichi, New Brunswick British North America to an English port.
Ritchie	United Kingdom	The barque was driven ashore at Lamlash, Isle of Arran. Her crew were rescued. She was on a voyage from Glasgow, Renfrewshire to New Orleans, Louisiana, United States. She was refloated on 4 December with assistance from the steamship Conqueror (United Kingdom) and towed into Greenock, Renfrewshire.
Rover	United Kingdom	The ship was driven ashore and wrecked at Arklow, County Wicklow.
Sir Hector	United Kingdom	The ship was driven ashore at Ramsey, Isle of Man. She was on a voyage from Killough, County Louth to Ardglass, County Down. She was refloated.

== 27 November ==
List of shipwrecks: 27 November 1843
Ship	State	Description
Juventus	United Kingdom	The schooner was driven ashore at Blackpool, Lancashire. She was on a voyage from Liverpool, Lancashire to Bangor, County Down.
Nelson Wood	United Kingdom	The brig was wrecked on Mason's Island, County Galway with the loss of ten of her fourteen crew. She was on a voyage from Demerara, British Honduras to Liverpool.
Rosanna	United Kingdom	The ship collided with Waterloo Packet (United Kingdom) off Spurn Point, Yorkshire and was abandoned. Her crew were rescued by Waterloo Packet. Rosanna was on a voyage from Grangemouth, Stirlingshire to Rotterdam, South Holland, Netherlands.
Stag	United Kingdom	The ship ran aground on the Moyapore Sand, off the coast of India.
Wilhelmina	Stettin	The ship sprang a leak and was abandoned by her crew. She was on a voyage from Grangemouth, Stirlingshire, United Kingdom to Stettin.

== 28 November ==
List of shipwrecks: 28 November 1843
Ship	State	Description
Bruderliche	Denmark	The ship was abandoned in the North Sea. Her crew were rescued by Harmonie (Netherlands). Bruderliche was on a voyage from Korsør to Antwerp, Belgium. She was subsequently taken into Amsterdam, North Holland, Netherlands in a sinking condition.
Castle Tioram	(United Kingdom of Great Britain and Ireland) British North America	The ship was wrecked 60 nautical miles (110 km) from Ribe, Denmark with the loss of all but five of her crew. Twenty-two Danish fishermen were also lost attempting a rescue. She was on a voyage from Plymouth, Devon to Hamburg.
Honoria	United Kingdom	The ship was wrecked on the Goodwin Sands, Kent. She was on a voyage from St. Ubes, Portugal to Hull, Yorkshire. Honoria subsequently floated off; she was driven ashore at Escalles, Pas-de-Calais, France on 3 December.
Hope	United Kingdom	The schooner departed from Limerick for Stromness, Orkney Islands. No further trace, presumed foundered with the loss of all hands.

== 29 November ==
List of shipwrecks: 29 November 1843
Ship	State	Description
Arnan	Norway	The ship was driven ashore on Skagen, Denmark. Her crew survived. She was on a voyage from Holmestrand to Aarhus, Denmark.
Concordia	Netherlands	The ship ran aground off "Rottennervag", Duchy of Holstein. Her crew survived. She was on a voyage from Elbing to Amsterdam, North Holland.
Cronstadt	Russia	The steamship sprang a leak and was beached near Koivula, Finland.
Draper	United Kingdom	The schooner was in collision with the schooner Christina (United Kingdom) and foundered in the English Channel off the coast of Kent. Draper was on a voyage from Exmouth, Devon to Portsmouth, Hampshire.
Elsa Sophia	Norway	The ship was lost at "Karriagoon". She was on a voyage from Riga, Russia to Stavanger.
Harmonie	Netherlands	The ship ran aground off "Rottennervag". Her crew survived. She was on a voyage from Danzig to Amsterdam. Harmonie was refloated on 21 January 1844.
Orbicular	United Kingdom	The ship was driven ashore and wrecked at Emden, Kingdom of Hanover. She was on a voyage from Sunderland, County Durham to Amsterdam, North Holland.
Unknown vessel	United Kingdom	The sloop capsized and sank in the North Sea off Whitby, Yorkshire with the loss of all hands.

== 30 November ==
List of shipwrecks: 30 November 1843
Ship	State	Description
Ann Maria	United Kingdom	The ship ran aground at Hong Kong.
Draper	United Kingdom	The ship was run down and sunk in the English Channel 5 nautical miles (9.3 km) east of Dungeness, Kent. Her crew were rescued.
Isabella Margaret	United Kingdom	The ship ran aground on the Whitby Rock and was damaged. She was on a voyage form Newcastle upon Tyne, Northumberland to Ipswich, Suffolk. She was refloated and taken into Whitby, Yorkshire.
Leda	United Kingdom	The ship was abandoned in the North Sea. Her crew were rescued by Olga ( (Russian Empire) Grand Duchy of Finland). Leda was on a voyage from Grangemouth, Stirlingshire to Amsterdam, North Holland, Netherlands.
Princess Royal	United Kingdom	The ship foundered in the North Sea off Cley-next-the-Sea, Norfolk. Her crew were rescued. She was on a voyage from Goole, Yorkshire to London.
Ritchie	United Kingdom	The ship was driven ashore and wrecked near Lamlash, Isle of Arran.
William and Susan	United Kingdom	The ship was driven ashore in the River Wye. She was on a voyage from Bullo Pill, Gloucestershire to Bridgwater, Somerset.

== Unknown date ==
List of shipwrecks: Unknown date in November 1843
Ship	State	Description
Anns	United Kingdom	The ship was wrecked on Hogland, Russia before 17 November. She was on a voyage from Kronstadt, Russia to London.
Archipelago	France	The ship was wrecked at Porto Ferrajo, Elbe, Grand Duchy of Tuscany. She was on a voyage from Marseille, Bouches-du-Rhône to Messina, Sicily.
Cawton	United Kingdom	The ship was driven ashore and wrecked at St. George's, Newfoundland before 12 November. Her crew survived.
Endeavour	United Kingdom	The ship foundered in the North Sea off Egmond aan Zee, North Holland, Netherlands before 10 November. Her crew were rescued. Shge was on a voyage from Sunderland, County Durham to Amsterdam, North Holland.
Hecla	Prussia	The steamship tug was driven ashore near Schwarzort before 24 November. She was later refloated and taken into Memel.
Iodine	United Kingdom	The ship was driven ashore near "Krossederessi", Ottoman Empire before 13 November. She was refloated with assistance from HMS Devastation (Royal Navy).
Le Fleurus	France	The whaler was wrecked in the Strait of Magellan.
Lunar	(United Kingdom of Great Britain and Ireland) New Zealand	The brig was wrecked on New Zealand's Middle Island (i.e., the South Island) early in November, en route between Melbourne and Otago. Various sources give different locations for the wreck, including The Bluff, Akaroa Harbour, and Waipapa Point. The crew survived the wreck.
Maddelena	Kingdom of Sardinia	The ship was lost near Bizerte, Beylik of Tunis before 21 November. Her crew were rescued. She was on a voyage from Genoa to Tunis.
Mercede	Kingdom of Sardinia	The ship was lost near Bizerte before 21 November. Her crew were rescued.
Nelcus	United Kingdom	The ship was lost in the North Sea off the coast of Suffolk before 4 November.
Nora	Norway	The schooner was wrecked off the Rio Grande. Her crew were rescued.
Princess Royal	United Kingdom	The sloop was driven ashore at Southport, Lancashire before 18 November.
Sir Charles Cockerell	United Kingdom	The whaler was lost in the Curia Maria Islands (17°33′N 56°06′E) before 10 November. Her crew were rescued.
