= Joseph-Mathurin Bourg =

Canadian Roman Catholic priest (1744– 1797)

Abbé Joseph-Mathurin Bourg (June 9, 1744 – August 20, 1797; French pronunciation: [buʁ]; English: /ˈbɜːr/; BER) was a Roman Catholic Spiritan priest. His family was among those Acadians expelled from Nova Scotia during the French and Indian War. They eventually ended up in France, where Bourg entered the seminary in Paris and joined the Congregation of the Holy Spirit. He was sent to Quebec, where he was ordained. He was assigned to the missions in Nova Scotia, and in 1774 made vicar-general for Acadia.

== Life ==
Bourg was born in Rivière-aux-Canards, the eldest son of Michel and Anne Hébert Bourg. In 1755 he was deported with his family to Virginia where they were refused asylum. They were then sent to England where they were held as prisoners until the Treaty of Paris was signed in 1763 and the Bourg family went to Saint-Malo, and eventually wound up in nearby Saint-Servan.

In 1767 he attended the Séminaire du Saint-Esprit in Paris, under the patronage of the Abbé de L’Isle-Dieu, the bishop of Quebec's vicar general in France. In 1770, he received minor orders in the parish church of Saint-Nicolas-du-Chardonnet in Paris. The following year he was sent to Quebec, where on 19 September 1772 he was ordained priest by Bishop Jean-Olivier Briand in the chapel of the Hôtel-Dieu de Montréal.

He was sent by his superiors to work in Baie des Chaleurs area. He was in charge of the missions of Nova Scotia, which also included New Brunswick and Gaspé. Bourg chose Tracadièche as his base. He learned the Mi'kmaq language and was greatly appreciated for his mediation efforts between Mi'kmaqs and white settlers. He lived in what is now Carleton and is responsible for the very first census of Carleton and Nouvelle.

Upon their return from France, his family went to live in Quebec. Bourg went to Quebec in the summer of 1774; around that time, Bishop Briand appointed him Vicar-General for Acadia. That autumn, he made a pastoral visit to the Acadians at Saint John River. From there he made his way to Petitcodiac, and Annapolis, and then Grosses Coques near St. Marys Bay, where he ministered to a group that had returned to settle there after being deported from Massachusetts.

Four years later, he was part of a commission to treat with the Maliseet and Mi'kmaq near Fort Howe; which area had come under attack by American privateers the year before. Bourg was successful in convincing them not to be persuaded by American provocateurs. He subsequently attended meetings at Fort Howe in 1780 and 1781. The abbé's mediation efforts were appreciated by Sir Richard Hughes who in recognition gave him the Heron Island (located between Carleton and present day Charlo. However he never took possession of these lands, being busy with the congregation in Carleton and the Island was eventually given up for Loyalist settlers.

In 1781 he returned to St. Marys Bay and established a church at Pointe-de-l'Église. He made annual visits to southwestern Nova Scotia, until in 1784, Bishop Briand asked him to re-locate to Halifax, which had grown considerably. Bourg was considered well-suited because he spoke English. However, he did not remain long, turning over pastoral duties to the recently arrived Irish Capuchin James Jones from Cork. Father Jones is described as "a very good priest, a learned man, and a gifted preacher.” In February 1786, he once again visited the Acadians of Nova Scotia, then returned to Baie des Chaleurs. In March 1795, after a serious illness, he was given charge of the parish of Saint-Laurent, near Montreal, where he remained until his death on 20 August 1797.

== See also ==
- Heron Island
- Carleton-sur-Mer
