= Heron Island (New Brunswick) =

Island in New Brunswick, Canada

Coordinates: 47°59′28″N 66°08′24″W

Heron Island (Mi'kmaq: Te'sn'geg) is a formerly inhabited 7.15 kilometres (4.44 mi) long island in Chaleur Bay, located approximately 4 km from New Mills, New Brunswick, and across from Carleton-sur-Mer, Quebec. It is accessible only at high tide from a wharf on the south side of the island. Today the island has been declared a provincial reserve and is under the care of the New Brunswick government . There is a native traditional burial ground near the northwest end of the island.

== History ==
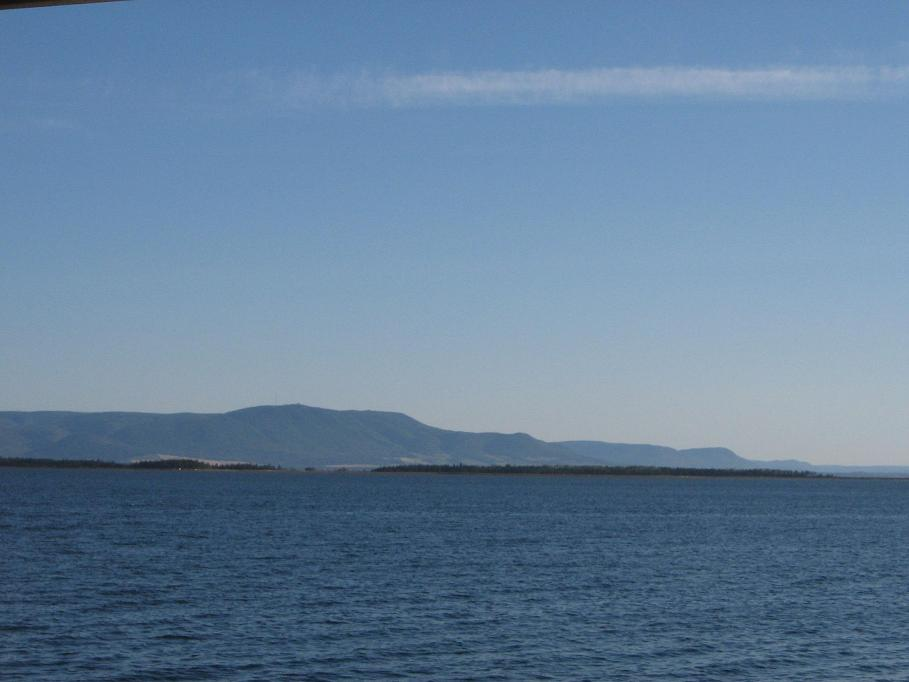
Heron Island as seen from New Brunswick with Quebec's Mont Saint-Joseph in background.

Abbé Joseph-Mathurin Bourg (practising in Carleton), first Acadian priest, was given the island and the land now called Charlo by Sir Richard Hughes, 2nd Baronet, Governor (on file in Louisbourg), in the capital, Halifax in thanks for his mediation efforts between the Mi'gmaks and the white settlers. However, he was too busy with his congregation work and never took possession. The deed was withdrawn and the island made available to loyalist settlers.

The Mi'kmaq called the island těsǔnǔgěk, but no longer resided on the island year long by the time the settlers arrived, except for a Mr. Bernard who spent summers there with his family, who made baskets from ash branches, in the 1930s. The first settlers arrived on the island around 1850 and they eventually built a school (last teacher was Miss Myrtle Cook). The school closed around 1920. The islanders were spared from the Great Depression as they had completely self-sufficient lifestyles.

Food was always plentiful on the island. The soil is rich and the farms, 12 farm lots, did well. They had pigs, chickens, cows. The island also offered raspberries and gooseberries. The waters were bountiful; the north side has great mussel bars and the south side has clam beds. They could fish for cod, mackerel, salmon, lobster, and they hunted geese and ducks and even chicken hawks.

The last person to be born on the island was Georgette Backs (née LaPointe) (on August 4, 1938), who wrote a historical account of her parents, George and Stella LaPointe (née Mercier), and her family of 10 siblings.

George is the great-great-great-grandson of Victoire Bourg, sister of Abbé Joseph-Mathurin Bourg, first Acadian priest, living in Baie des Chaleurs. George and Stella married in the US when George returned from World War I, and then lived in New Mills, New Brunswick before he took the job of lighthouse keeper on Heron Island in 1921 and moved his family to the island. In 1940, the family left the island and George went to World War II.

Georgette Backs died November 10, 2017, in Mississauga, Ontario, and her ashes are scattered on Heron Island.

== See also ==
- List of communities in New Brunswick
- List of islands of New Brunswick
